= Cannonball Adderley discography =

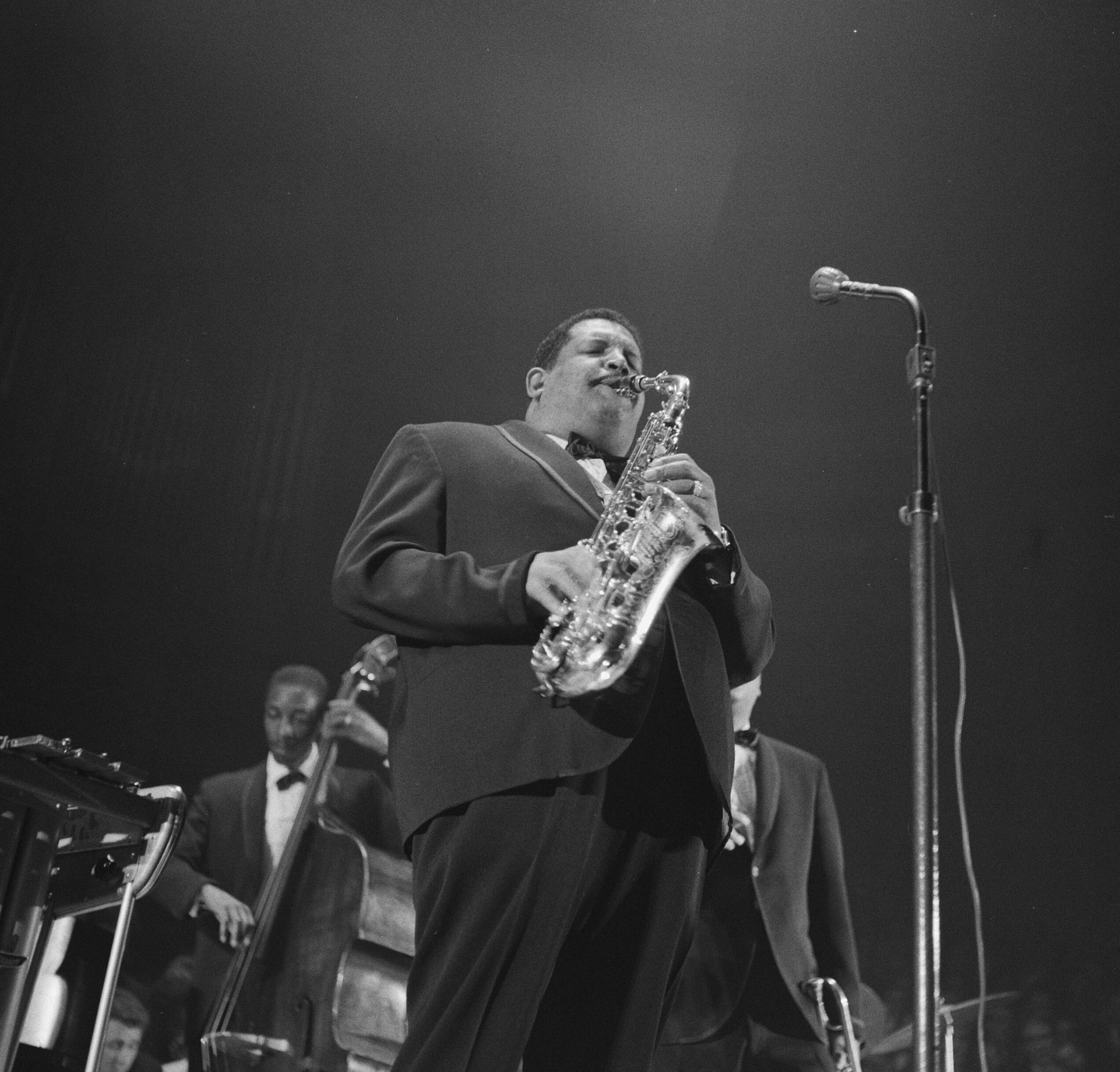
- Adderley at the Concertgebouw, Amsterdam, 1961
- Studio albums: 36
- Live albums: 23
- Compilation albums: 11
- Albums as producer: 3

This article presents the discography of the American jazz saxophonist Julian "Cannonball" Adderley (1928–1975), including albums released under his own name and albums to which he made significant contributions.

== Discography ==
=== As leader ===
Recording date	Title	Label	Year released	Notes
1955-07-14	Presenting Cannonball Adderley	Savoy	1955	
1955-07-21, -29; 1955-08-05	Julian "Cannonball" Adderley	EmArcy	1955	
1955-10-27, -28	Julian Cannonball Adderley and Strings	EmArcy	1955	
1956-06-08, -18	In the Land of Hi-Fi with Julian Cannonball Adderley	EmArcy	1956	
1957-02-06, -08, -11	Sophisticated Swing	EmArcy	1957	
1957-02-07, -08, -11; 1957-03-06	Cannonball Enroute	Mercury	1961	
1958-03-04, -06	Cannonball's Sharpshooters	Mercury	1958	
1958-03-09	Somethin' Else – with Miles Davis	Blue Note	1958	
1958-07-01	Portrait of Cannonball	Riverside	1958	
1958-08-20, -21	Jump for Joy	EmArcy	1958	
1958-10-28	Things Are Getting Better – with Milt Jackson	Riverside	1958	
1959-01-20; 1959-02-18	Blue Spring – with Kenny Dorham	Riverside	1959	
1959-02-03	Cannonball Adderley Quintet in Chicago – with John Coltrane	Mercury	1959	
1959-04-23, -07; 1959-05-12	Cannonball Takes Charge	Riverside	1959	
1959-10-18, -20	The Cannonball Adderley Quintet in San Francisco	Riverside	1959	Live
1960-02-01; 1960-03-29	Them Dirty Blues	Riverside	1960	
1960-05-21; 1960-06-05	Cannonball Adderley and the Poll-Winners – with Wes Montgomery	Riverside	1960	
1960-10-16	The Cannonball Adderley Quintet at the Lighthouse	Riverside	1960	Live
1961-01-27; 1960-02-21; 1961-03-13	Know What I Mean? – with Bill Evans	Riverside	1961	
1961-02-28; 1961-05-09, -15	African Waltz – with orchestra conducted by Ernie Wilkins	Riverside	1961	
1961-05-11	Plus	Riverside	1961	
1961-06-27, -29; 1961-08-23, -24	Nancy Wilson/Cannonball Adderley	Capitol	1962	
1962-01-12, -14	The Cannonball Adderley Sextet in New York	Riverside	1962	Live
1962-08-04, -05	Cannonball in Europe!	Riverside (Europe)	1964	Live
1962-09-22, -23	Jazz Workshop Revisited	Riverside	1962	Live
1962-12-07, -10, -11	Cannonball's Bossa Nova	Riverside	1963	
1963-07-09, -14, -15	Nippon Soul	Riverside	1963	Live
1963-07-09, -14, -15	Autumn Leaves	Riverside (Japan)	1975	Live
1962-09-21; 1963-07-09, -14	The Sextet	Milestone	1982	Live
1964-07-31 – 1964-08-02	Cannonball Adderley Live!	Capitol	1964	Live
1962-09-19; 1964-10-04	Live Session! – with Ernie Andrews	Capitol	1964	Live
1964-10-19, -21	Cannonball Adderley's Fiddler on the Roof	Capitol	1964	
1965-04-26	Domination – with orchestra conducted by Oliver Nelson	Capitol	1965	
1966-03-18, -19, -20	Money in the Pocket	Capitol	2005	Live
1966-04-06, -07	Great Love Themes – with strings conducted by Ray Ellis	Capitol	1966	
1966-08-26	Cannonball in Japan	Capitol	1966	Live
1966-10-20	Mercy, Mercy, Mercy! Live at "The Club"	Capitol	1967	Live
1967-03-06, -23	Why Am I Treated So Bad!	Capitol	1967	
1967-06-12; 1967-07-24	74 Miles Away	Capitol	1967	
1966-06-15, -22; 1967-10-06, -13	Swingin' In Seattle, Live At The Penthouse	Reel to Real	2019	Live
1967-12; 1968-01	Radio Nights	Night/Virgin	1990	Live
1968-09-23; 1968-10-07	In Person – with Lou Rawls and Nancy Wilson	Capitol	1968	
1968-10-13, -14	Accent on Africa	Capitol	1968	
1969-12 or 1970-01	Country Preacher	Capitol	1970	Live
1969-03-20	Liederhalle Stuttgart / March 20, 1969	Jazzhaus	2012	Live
1970-06	The Cannonball Adderley Quintet & Orchestra [aka Experience in E]	Capitol	1970	
1970	Love, Sex, and the Zodiac	Fantasy	1974	
1970-09-19; 1970-10-05, -06	The Price You Got to Pay to Be Free	Capitol	1970	Partially live
1970	The Happy People	Capitol	1972	
1971-08-03, -09	The Black Messiah	Capitol	1971	Live
1971	Music, You All	Capitol	1976	Live
1973-06-04	Inside Straight	Fantasy	1973	Live
1974	Pyramid	Fantasy	1974	
1975-02; 1975-04	Phenix	Fantasy	1975	
1975	Big Man: The Legend of John Henry	Fantasy	1975	
1975-06-24, -25, -30	Lovers	Fantasy	1976	
1975-05-??	Cannonball – Volume One	Dobre	1977	Live

- Burnin' in Bordeaux: Live in France / 1969 (Elemental Music, 2024)
- Poppin' in Paris: Live at L'Olympia / 1972 (Elemental Music, 2024)

=== As sideman ===
With Nat Adderley

- Introducing Nat Adderley (Wing, 1955)
- To the Ivy League from Nat (EmArcy, 1956)
- That's Right! (EmArcy, 1960)
- In the Bag (Jazzland, 1962)
- Soul Zodiac (Capitol, 1972)
- Soul of the Bible (Capitol, 1972)
- Double Exposure (Prestige, 1975)

With Miles Davis

- Milestones (Columbia, 1958)
- Miles & Monk at Newport (Columbia, 1964) – live. also released on Miles Davis at Newport 1955-1975: The Bootleg Series Vol. 4.
- Porgy and Bess (Columbia, 1959) – recorded in 1958
- Kind of Blue (Columbia, 1959)
- Jazz at the Plaza (Columbia, 1973) – live recorded in 1958
- 1958 Miles (Columbia, 1974)– recorded in 1958

With Ray Brown

- Ray Brown with the All-Star Big Band (Verve, 1962)
- Two for the Blues (Verve, 1966)

With others

- Kenny Clarke, Bohemia After Dark (Savoy, 1955)
- Sarah Vaughan, In the Land of Hi-Fi (EmArcy, 1955)
- Dinah Washington, In the Land of Hi-Fi (EmArcy, 1956)
- Milt Jackson, Plenty, Plenty Soul (Atlantic, 1957)
- Louis Smith, Here Comes Louis Smith (Blue Note, 1958) – credited as "Buckshot La Funke"
- Gil Evans, New Bottle Old Wine (World Pacific, 1958)
- John Benson Brooks, Alabama Concerto (Riverside, 1958)
- Machito, Kenya (Roulette, 1958)
- Paul Chambers, Go (Vee-Jay, 1959)
- Philly Joe Jones, Drums Around the World (Riverside, 1959)
- Jon Hendricks, A Good Git-Together (World Pacific, 1959)
- Jimmy Heath, Really Big! (Riverside, 1960)
- Sam Jones, The Chant (Riverside, 1961)
- Eddie "Cleanhead" Vinson, Back Door Blues (Riverside, 1962)
- Oscar Peterson, Bursting Out with the All-Star Big Band! (1962)
- Joe Williams, Joe Williams Live (Fantasy, 1973)
- Gene Ammons, Gene Ammons and Friends at Montreux (Prestige, 1973)
- David Axelrod, Heavy Axe (Fantasy, 1974)
- Raul de Souza, Colors (Milestone, 1975) – recorded in 1974

=== As a producer ===
- The Sound of the Wide Open Spaces!!!! (1960) – David "Fathead" Newman and James Clay
- A Portrait of Thelonious (1961) – Bud Powell
- A Tribute to Cannonball (1961) – Don Byas and Bud Powell

=== Compilations ===
- Discoveries (1955) – compiles alternate takes from Presenting Cannonball Adderley and Kenny Clarke's Bohemia After Dark
- Cannonball Adderley Greatest Hits (1962)
- The Japanese Concerts (1975) – compiles Autumn Leaves and Nippon Soul
- The Best of Cannonball Adderley: The Capitol Years (1991)
- Deep Groove! The Best of Cannonball Adderley (1994)
- Sophisticated Swing: The EmArcy Small Group Sessions (1995) – compiles Sophisticated Swing, Cannonball Enroute, Cannonball's Sharpshooters, & Nat Adderley's To the Ivy League from Nat
- Greatest Hits: The Riverside Years (1998)
- Ultimate Cannonball Adderley (1999) compiled by Joe Zawinul
- Cannonball Adderley's Finest Hour (2001)
- The Definitive Cannonball Adderley (2002)
- Walk Tall: The David Axelrod Years (Stateside, 2006)[2CD]
