= Rick Holmes (disc jockey) =

American jazz radio disc jockey

Richard "Rick" Arthur Holmes, Jr. (April 21, 1936 – August 21, 2015), was an American jazz radio disc jockey and Grammy-nominated spoken word recording artist. Holmes was born in Knoxville, Tennessee and after serving in the United States Navy, moved to Los Angeles. He was employed at the US Postal Service while attending the Don Martin School of Broadcasting, and after graduation he began his professional radio career at KBCA Radio 105.1 FM, in Los Angeles, where he worked from 1967 until 1970.

Holmes' show "Rick's Affair" featured "Poinciana", in an arrangement by Ahmad Jamal, as its theme song. The show became "Rick's Family Affair" in 1975. Holmes was later hired by KJLH 103.2 FM, owned by Stevie Wonder, where he hosted evening jazz show "Holmes in your Home."

As a recording artist, Holmes is known for three albums that combined spiritual jazz and his spoken word recitations: Soul Zodiac (Capitol, 1972), Soul of the Bible (Capitol, 1972) and Love, Sex and the Zodiac (Fantasy, 1974). The first two albums actually feature the music of the Nat Adderley Sextet, but all three are credited as "Presented by Cannonball Adderley." All three albums are co-produced by David Axelrod.

Holmes received a nomination at the 15th Grammy Awards for "Best Spoken Word Recording" for Soul Zodiac.

Of Love, Sex and the Zodiac, Richie Unterberger of AllMusic wrote, "The real artist on this album is not so much [Cannonball] Adderley as Rick Holmes (jazz DJ on Los Angeles radio station KBCA), who wrote and narrated the voice-overs to which Adderley and other musicians supplied a musical backdrop. In common with numerous other records around the Age of Aquarius, it has one track for each astrological sign. In smooth hip period DJ patter, Holmes declaims homilies as to how those born under each sign integrate both sex and love as part of their being. A cast of musicians, including Cannonball, his brother Nat Adderley on cornet and George Duke on electric piano, backs Holmes' unctuous musings with sketchy fusion instrumentals, co-produced by David Axelrod and Cannonball."

In 1981, Holmes collaborated with Roy Ayers on the 12" single "Remember to Remember" (Gold Mink Records).
