= Olga James =

American singer and actress (1929–2025)

- Born: February 16, 1929; Washington, D.C., U.S.
- Died: January 25, 2025 (aged 95); Los Angeles, California, U.S.
- Other names: Olga James Adderley; Olga Adderley-Chandler
- Occupations: Singer; actress
- Spouses: Cannonball Adderley (m. 1962; died 1975); Len Chandler

Olga James (February 16, 1929 – January 25, 2025) was an American singer and actress best known for her role in the film Carmen Jones (1954). Her later acting credits include a role in the Broadway musical Mr. Wonderful and a recurring role on The Bill Cosby Show.

== Early life and education ==
James was born in Washington, D.C., on February 16, 1929. Her father was a saxophonist and her mother was a dancer on the Chitlin Circuit. Her parents separated during her childhood and her mother remarried. James was raised by her grandparents until she was admitted into Juilliard in New York City, then she went to live with her mother in Newark, New Jersey.

At Juilliard, James befriended singer Leontyne Price. Although James studied opera, she preferred to sing Mozart art songs, German lieder, and French chansons.

== Acting and singing career ==
Through networking at Juilliard, she was hired for her first professional role in 1952 as member of the production of Virgil Thomson's opera Four Saints in Three Acts which performed at a festival in Paris. Some time after she returned to New York, she earned a coveted spot as a singer in the all-black revue Larry Steele's Smart Affairs at Atlantic City's Club Harlem. While the revue was touring, she was recommended to audition for Otto Preminger's film Carmen Jones (1954), an all-black musical based on Georges Bizet's opera Carmen. James played the part of Cindy Lou, fiancée of Joe, played by Harry Belafonte. Following the success of the film, James appeared in nightclubs and she made her television debut during a Harlem Globetrotters game in 1955. James, who was referred to as the sepia Leslie Caron, was managed by Harlem Globetrotters owner Abe Saperstein.

In 1956, James made her Broadway debut opposite of Sammy Davis Jr. as Ethel Pearson in Mr. Wonderful. During the production she became friends with actress Frances Taylor who was dating jazz musician Miles Davis. One night, Taylor took James to see Davis perform at a nightclub where she introduced her to saxophonist Julian "Cannonball" Adderley. James saw Adderley four years later in Los Angeles before she embarked on an international tour in 1960. Two years later, she went with her friend to see Adderley perform in March 1962. They began dating and married on June 28 at New York City Hall. The couple had a surprise church wedding in Florida, arranged by Adderley's parents and spent their honeymoon at the Fontainebleau Hotel in Miami Beach. They remained together until his death in 1975.

Between 1969 and 1971, James had a reoccurring role on The Bill Cosby Show. In 1972, she did voice-over work for the cartoon series Sealab 2020.

== Personal life and death ==
James was married to first husband, jazz musician Julian "Cannonball" Adderley from 1962 until his death in 1975 and second husband, folk musician, Len Chandler until his death in 2023.

James died in Los Angeles on January 25, 2025, at the age of 95 from complications of a fall.

== Vocal credits ==
- 1954: Carmen Jones (From the Original Soundtrack)
- 1956: Sammy Davis Jr. / 1956 Broadway Cast – Mr. Wonderful
- 1972: Cannonball Adderley Presents the Nat Adderley Sextet Plus Rick Holmes – Soul of the Bible
- 1972: The Cannonball Adderley Quintet – The Happy People
- 1974: David Axelrod – Heavy Axe
