= Jay Migliori =

American saxophonist (1930–2001)

Background information
- Born: November 14, 1930; Erie, Pennsylvania, U.S.
- Died: September 2, 2001 (aged 70) Mission Viejo, California, U.S.
- Genres: Jazz
- Occupation: Musician
- Instrument: Saxophone

Jay Migliori (November 14, 1930 – September 2, 2001) was an American saxophonist, best known as a founding member of Supersax, a tribute band to Charlie Parker.

== Biography ==
Migliori started playing the saxophone after he received one as a birthday present at the age of twelve. He attended a music school in St. Louis, and after serving in the Air Force, went to the Berklee College of Music.

He made his first recording in 1955, and soon joined up with Woody Herman's band. After leaving the band, he would then move to Los Angeles, where he became a session musician playing on an estimated 4,000 commercial recordings. Some artists he recorded with include the Beach Boys, Frank Sinatra, Frank Zappa, Onzy Matthews, Maynard Ferguson, and many more. He also played live with thousands of musicians including Charlie Parker and Miles Davis.

In 1972, he would become a member of Supersax, a nine-piece band (featuring five saxophones) that was started by saxophonist Med Flory and bassist Buddy Clark. He, along with Warne Marsh, played tenor sax in the band and Carl Fontana, Frank Rosolino (trombone). The group won a Grammy in 1974.

In 2001, he died of colon cancer.

== Discography ==
=== As leader ===
- Count the Nights and Times (PBR, 1975)
- The Courage (Discovery, 1982)
- Smile (Cexton, 1996)

With Supersax

- Supersax Plays Bird (Capitol, 1973)
- Salt Peanuts (Capitol, 1974)
- Supersax Plays Bird with Strings (Capitol, 1975)
- Chasin' the Bird (MPS, 1977)
- Dynamite !! (MPS, 1979)
- L.A. (Columbia, 1983)
- Supersax & L.A. Voices Volume 2 (CBS, 1984)
- Straighten Up and Fly Right Volume 3 (Columbia, 1986)
- Stone Bird (Columbia, 1988)
- Live in '75 The Japanese Tour (Hindsight, 1998)
- Live in '75 The Japanese Tour Vol. 2 (Hindsight, 1999)

=== As sideman ===
With The Beach Boys

- All Summer Long (Capitol, 1964)
- The Beach Boys Today! (Capitol, 1965)
- Pet Sounds (Capitol, 1966)
- 15 Big Ones (Brother/Reprise, 1976)
- Love You (Brother, 1977)

With others

- The 5th Dimension, Living Together, Growing Together (Bell, 1973)
- Cannonball Adderley, Big Man (Fantasy, 1975)
- Nat Adderley, Double Exposure (Prestige, 1975)
- Gene Ammons, Brasswind (Prestige, 1974)
- Paul Anka, Toi et Moi (Ariola, 1979)
- David Axelrod, Heavy Axe (Fantasy, 1974)
- David Axelrod, Seriously Deep (Polydor, 1975)
- Hoyt Axton, Southbound (A&M, 1975)
- Bob B. Soxx & the Blue Jeans, Zip a Dee Doo Dah (Philles, 1976)
- The Byrds, Younger Than Yesterday (Columbia, 1967)
- The Byrds, The Notorious Byrd Brothers (Columbia, 1968)
- Captain & Tennille, Song of Joy (A&M, 1976)
- The Catalinas, Fun Fun Fun (Recording Industries, 1964)
- Harry Chapin, Portrait Gallery (Elektra, 1975)
- Leonard Cohen, Death of a Ladies' Man (Columbia, 1977)
- Albert Collins, There's Gotta Be a Change (Tumbleweed, 1971)
- Danny Cox, Birth Announcement (Together, 1969)
- Dick Dale, Summer Surf (Capitol, 1964)
- Miles Davis, Hi-Hat All-Stars (Fresh Sound, 1987)
- Neil Diamond, Tap Root Manuscript (Uni, 1970)
- Richard "Dimples" Fields, Give Everybody Some! (Boardwalk, 1982)
- Kinky Friedman, Kinky Friedman (ABC, 1974)
- The Friends of Distinction, Whatever (RCA Victor, 1970)
- Thomas & Richard Frost, Thomas & Richard Frost (1972)
- Roosevelt Grier, Soul City (Recording Industries, 1964)
- Hampton Hawes, Northern Windows (Prestige, 1974)
- Woody Herman & Tito Puente, Herman's Heat & Puente's Beat! (Everest, 1958)
- Annie Herring, Through a Child's Eyes (Sparrow, 1976)
- Jan and Dean, Surf City and Other Swingin' Cities (Liberty, 1963)
- Paul Jeffrey, Paul Jeffrey (Mainstream, 1974)
- Linn County, Fever Shot (Mercury, 1969)
- The Manhattan Transfer, Coming Out (Atlantic, 1976)
- The Manhattan Transfer, Pastiche (Atlantic, 1978)
- Barry Mann, Survivor (RCA Victor, 1975)
- Onzy Matthews, Blues with a Touch of Elegance (Capitol, 1964)
- Don Menza, Burnin' (M&K Realtime, 1981)
- The Monkees, Valleri (Colgems, 1968)
- Harry Nilsson, Duit On Mon Dei (RCA Victor, 1975)
- Harry Nilsson, Sandman (RCA Victor, 1976)
- Charlie Parker, Hi-Hat All-Stars (Fresh Sound, 1988)
- Van Dyke Parks, Song Cycle (Warner Bros., 1967)
- Van Dyke Parks, Discover America (Rykodisc, 1999)
- Esther Phillips, Confessin' the Blues (Atlantic, 1976)
- Helen Reddy, Music Music (Capitol, 1976)
- The Righteous Brothers, Back to Back (Philles, 1965)
- Dick Rosmini, A Genuine Rosmini (Imperial, 1969)
- The Tubes, Young and Rich (A&M, 1976)
- Loudon Wainwright III, Unrequited (Columbia, 1975)
- Joe Williams, In Good Company (Verve, 1989)
- Brian Wilson, Brian Wilson (Sire/Reprise, 1988)
- Neil Young, Journey Through the Past (Reprise, 1972)
- Frank Zappa, Zappa Wazoo (Vaulternative, 2007)
- Frank Zappa, One Shot Deal (Zappa, 2008)
- Si Zentner, Suddenly It's Swing (Liberty, 1960)
