= Phenix (album) =

Studio album by Cannonball Adderley
- Released: 1975
- Recorded: February–April, 1975
- Studio: Fantasy (Berkeley)
- Genre: Jazz
- Length: 71:45
- Label: Fantasy
- Producer: Julian "Cannonball" Adderley, Nat Adderley, and Orrin Keepnews

Cannonball Adderley chronology
Pyramid (1974)	Phenix (1975)	Lovers (1975)

Phenix is an album by jazz saxophonist Cannonball Adderley recorded in 1975 at the Fantasy Studios in Berkeley, California, featuring performances by Adderley's Quintet with Nat Adderley, keyboardist Michael Wolff, bassist Walter Booker and drummer Roy McCurdy with guest percussionist Airto Moreira and past Quintet members keyboardist George Duke, bassist Sam Jones, and drummer Louis Hayes guesting on select tracks. The program essentially consists of energetic new arrangements of the Quintet's best known pieces from the late 1950s to the early 1970s, including Nat Adderley's “Work Song”.

== Reception ==
The Allmusic review by Scott Yanow awarded the album 4 stars and states: "Adderley's next-to-last recording (cut just four months before he died of a stroke at age 46) was ironically a retrospective.... A recommended set with plenty of excellent music, it serves as a fine overview of Cannonball Adderley's career."

Professional ratings
Review scores
Source	Rating
Allmusic	4/5 stars
The Penguin Guide to Jazz	2.5/4 stars
The Rolling Stone Jazz Record Guide	1/5 stars

== Track listing ==
All compositions by Julian "Cannonball" Adderley except as indicated

1. "Hi-Fly" (Randy Weston) - 6:04
2. "Work Song" (Nat Adderley) - 6:28
3. "Sack O' Woe" - 5:06
4. "Jive Samba" (Nat Adderley) - 5:19
5. "This Here" (Bobby Timmons) - 7:12
6. "The Sidewalks of New York" (James W. Blake, Charles B. Lawlor) - 5:37
7. "Hamba Nami" - 5:24
8. "Domination" - 6:55
9. "74 Miles Away" (Joe Zawinul) - 5:58
10. "Country Preacher" (Zawinul) - 4:26
11. "Stars Fell on Alabama" (Mitchell Parish, Frank Perkins) - 5:48
12. "Walk Tall/Mercy, Mercy, Mercy" (Queen Esther Marrow, Jim Rein, Zawinul/Zawinul) - 7:28
- Recorded at Fantasy Studios in Berkeley, CA, in February, March & April 1975

== Personnel ==
- Cannonball Adderley - alto saxophone, soprano saxophone
- Nat Adderley - cornet
- George Duke - keyboards, synthesizers (tracks 1–6)
- Michael Wolff - keyboards (tracks 7–12)
- Sam Jones - acoustic bass (tracks 1–6)
- Walter Booker - acoustic and electric bass (tracks 7–10 & 12)
- Louis Hayes - drums (tracks 1–6)
- Roy McCurdy - drums (tracks 7–10 & 12)
- Airto Moreira - percussion, congas
