= Lovers (Cannonball Adderley album) =

Studio album by Cannonball Adderley
- Released: 1976
- Recorded: June 24–25 and October 31, 1975
- Studio: Fantasy (Berkeley)
- Genre: Jazz
- Label: Fantasy
- Producer: Nat Adderley & Orrin Keepnews

Cannonball Adderley chronology
Phenix (1975)	Lovers (1976)	Big Man (1976)

Professional ratings
Review scores
Source	Rating
Allmusic	1.5/5 stars

Lovers is an album by jazz saxophonist Cannonball Adderley. It was recorded at Fantasy Studios in Berkeley, California in 1975 by Adderley with Nat Adderley, Alvin Batiste, George Duke, Alphonso Johnson, Jack DeJohnette, Airto Moreira. A posthumously released track included Flora Purim, Nat Adderley Jr., and Ron Carter.

== Reception ==
The Allmusic review by Scott Yanow awarded the album 1½ stars and states: "This particular LP was already more than half completed with Adderley taking his last solos on three of the selections... but unfortunately none of the music is all that memorable.... After Cannonball's death 'Lovers' (which had been planned for the album) was recorded as a memorial.... The intentions were honorable but the music is pretty forgettable."

== Track listing ==
1. "Nascente" (Hermeto Pascoal) - 6:03
2. "New Orleans Strut" (Jack DeJohnette) - 4:33
3. "Children of Time" (George Duke) - 3:39
4. "Ayjala" (Alvin Batiste) - 7:03
5. "Salty Dogs" (Batiste) - 7:28
6. "Lovers" (Nat Adderley Jr.) - 11:39

== Personnel ==
- Cannonball Adderley – alto saxophone, soprano saxophone
- Nat Adderley – cornet
- Alvin Batiste – clarinet, flute, tenor saxophone
- George Duke – electric piano, synthesizers, vocals
- Nat Adderley Jr. – electric piano
- Alphonso Johnson – bass guitar
- Ron Carter – double bass
- Jack DeJohnette – drums
- Airto Moreira – percussion
- Flora Purim – vocals
