= Soul of the Bible =

Studio album by The Nat Adderley Sextet and Rick Holmes
- Released: October 14, 1972
- Recorded: 1972
- Studio: Capitol, Hollywood, California
- Genre: Soul jazz
- Length: 1:22:30
- Label: Capitol
- Producer: Cannonball Adderley; David Axelrod

Nat Adderley chronology
Soul Zodiac (1972)	Soul of the Bible (1972)	Double Exposure (1975)

Professional ratings
Review scores
Source	Rating
AllMusic	2/5 stars
The Penguin Guide to Jazz Recordings	2.5/4 stars

Soul of the Bible is the second collaborative studio album by the Nat Adderley Sextet and Rick Holmes, presented by Julian "Cannonball" Adderley. It was released as a follow-up to Soul Zodiac through Capitol Records in 1972. Recording sessions took place at Capitol Records Studio in Hollywood, California with production handled by David Axelrod and Cannonball Adderley.

The album features narration from Rick Holmes and contributions from the sextet: Nat Adderley on cornet, George Duke and Nat Adderley Jr. on electric piano, Walter Booker on acoustic bass, Francisco Centeno on electric bass, and Roy McCurdy on drums, with guest appearances by vocalists Fleming Williams, Arthur Charma, Olga James and Stephanie Spruill, and percussionists Airto Moreira, King Errisson, Mayuto Correa and Octavio Bailly, Jr.

== Track listing ==
No.	Title	Writer(s)	Length
1.	"In the Beginning"	David Axelrod; George Duke	1:20
2.	"Yield"	Olga James	2:20
3.	"Obeah"	Julian "Cannonball" Adderley	7:36
4.	"Fun in the Church" (featuring Fleming Williams)	Julian "Cannonball" Adderley; Fleming Williams	7:08
5.	"The Eternal Walk"	Nat Adderley; Rick Holmes	6:48
6.	"Krukma"	George Duke	3:17
7.	"Gone"	Julian "Cannonball" Adderley; Nat Adderley	4:00
8.	"Behold" (featuring Arthur Charma)	Nat Adderley; Arthur Charma	3:15
9.	"Psalm 24"	Walter Booker	4:56
10.	"Make Your Own Temple"	Julian "Cannonball" Adderley; Rick Holmes	5:58
11.	"Taj"	Nat Adderley, Jr.; Francisco Centeno; Airto Moreira	14:52
12.	"Psalm 54"	Julian "Cannonball" Adderley; Chick Corea	1:55
13.	"Amani" (featuring Olga James)	Nat Adderley; Francisco Centeno	11:35
14.	"Space Spiritual" (featuring Stephanie Spruill)	Nat Adderley	7:30
Total length:			1:22:30

== Personnel ==
Musicians

- Nathaniel Carlyle Adderley – cornet
- George Duke – electric piano, piano
- Walter Booker – acoustic bass
- Roy McCurdy – drums
- Francisco Centeno – electric bass
- Nathaniel E. Adderley, Jr. – piano, electric piano
- Rick Holmes – narration
- Julian "Cannonball" Adderley – alto saxophone, soprano saxophone, arrangement, presenter
- Fleming Williams – vocals (track 4)
- Arthur Charma – vocals (track 8)
- Olga James – vocals (track 13)
- Stephanie Spruill – vocals (track 14)
- Airto Moreira – percussion
- "King" Errisson Pallman Johnson – percussion
- Mayuto Correa – percussion
- Octavio Bailly Jr – percussion

Production

- Cannonball Adderley – producer
- David Axelrod – producer
- Gene Hicks – engineer
- Jay Ranellucci – engineer
- John Hoernle – art direction
- Roy Kohara – design
- Leroy Brooks – photography
