= The Happy People =

Live album by The Cannonball Adderley Quintet
- Released: 1972
- Recorded: 1970
- Genre: Latin jazz; soul jazz
- Length: 40:36
- Label: Capitol
- Producer: David Axelrod; Cannonball Adderley

Cannonball Adderley chronology
The Black Messiah (1971)	The Happy People (1972)	Music You All (1972)

Professional ratings
Review scores
Source	Rating
AllMusic	4/5 stars

The Happy People is a live album by the Cannonball Adderley Quintet, a band led by jazz saxophonist Julian "Cannonball" Adderley. It was recorded in 1970 in New York City and released in 1972 through Capitol Records. It features contributions from the quintet: Cannonball Adderley on saxophone, George Duke on piano, Walter Booker on string bass, Roy McCurdy on drums and Nat Adderley on cornet, with guest appearances from Airto Moreira, Olga James, Flora Purim, David T. Walker, Chuck Rainey, King Errisson and Mayuto Correa.

== Track listing ==
No.	Title	Writer(s)	Length
1.	"The Happy People" (featuring Airto Moreira)	Airto Moreira	11:22
2.	"Maria Tres Filhos"	Milton Nascimento	10:40
3.	"Savior" (featuring Olga James)	Julian "Cannonball" Adderley; Olga James	14:31
4.	"ELA" (featuring Airto Moreira)	Benito di Paula	4:11
Total length:			40:36

== Personnel ==
The Cannonball Adderley Quintet

- Julian "Cannonball" Adderley – alto saxophone, producer
- Nathaniel Carlyle "Nat" Adderley – cornet
- George Duke – piano, electric piano, arrangement (track 2)
- Walter Booker – double bass
- Roy McCurdy – drums

Additional musicians

- Airto Moreira – lead vocals (tracks: 1, 4), percussion
- Olga James – lead vocals (track 3)
- Flora Purim – vocals
- David T. Walker – guitar (track 3)
- Chuck Rainey – electric bass (track 3)
- "King" Errisson Pallman Johnson – percussion
- Mayuto Correa – percussion (tracks 1, 2, 4)
- David Axelrod – arrangement (tracks: 1, 3), producer
- Nathaniel Adderley Jr. – arrangement (track 4)

Technical

- John Hoernle – art direction
- George Bartell – illustration
- Leroy Brooks – photography
