= Joe Williams Live =

1973 live album by Joe Williams

Live album by Joe Williams
- Released: 1973
- Recorded: August 7, 1973, at Fantasy Studios in Berkeley, CA
- Genre: Jazz
- Length: 44:06
- Label: Fantasy F 9441
- Producer: David Axelrod and Nat Adderley

Joe Williams chronology
| With Love (1972) | Joe Williams Live (1973) | Nothin' but the Blues (1984) |

Professional ratings
Review scores
| Source | Rating |
|---|---|
| Allmusic | 4/5 stars |
| DownBeat | 5/5 stars |

Joe Williams Live is a live album by Joe Williams featuring Cannonball Adderley's Septet recorded at Fantasy Studios' Studio "A" in front of a live audience and released on the Fantasy label.

== Reception ==
The Allmusic review by Scott Yanow awarded the album 4 stars and states that "the singer easily steals the show on a searing version of 'Goin' to Chicago Blues,' and his own 'Who She Do,' and a few unusual songs, including Duke Ellington's 'Heritage.'"

DownBeat assigned 5 stars. Ray Townley wrote, "I didn't know they made albums like this any more— if they ever did! Joe Williams Live evokes the gamut of great (male) jazz vocalists of the past and present". He finds Williams' performance of "Yesterday, Today and Tomorrow" to be "Brooding. poignant, with an aura of urban finality, Williams touches our deepest emotions".

== Track listing ==
All compositions by Joe Williams except as indicated

1. "Who She Do" – 4:23
2. "On Green Dolphin Street" (Bronisław Kaper, Ned Washington) – 4:59
3. "Heritage" (Duke Ellington) – 3:19
4. "Sad Song" (Will Tilghman) – 4:40
5. "Goin' to Chicago Blues" (Count Basie, Jimmy Rushing) – 6:45
6. "A Beautiful Friendship" (Donald Kahn, Stanley Styne) – 3:20
7. "Yesterday, Today and Tomorrow" (Tom McIntosh) – 3:39
8. "Tell Me Where to Scratch (I Want to Love You Baby)" – 3:53
9. "Medley: All Blues/Goin' to Chicago Blues/C.C. Rider" (Miles Davis/Basie, Rushing/Ma Rainey) – 9:48 Bonus track on CD reissue

== Personnel ==
- Joe Williams – vocals
- Cannonball Adderley – alto saxophone
- Nat Adderley – cornet
- George Duke – piano, electric piano
- Walter Booker – bass, guitar
- Carol Kaye – electric bass
- Roy McCurdy – drums
- King Errisson – congas
