= Operation Breadbasket =

African-American civil rights organization active in the 1960s and 70s

- Founded: 1962
- Founder: Fred C. Bennette
- Purpose: Improving economic conditions
- Location: United States

Operation Breadbasket was an American civil rights movement organization active from 1966 to 1971, which dedicated to improving the economic conditions of African Americans communities across the United States. Its primary objective was to promote the employment of African Americans by companies operating in black communities and support the growth of black-owned businesses. ts main activity was picketing and boycotting companies that discriminated against African Americans.

The organization was launched on February 11, 1966, under the leadership of Jesse Jackson. Martin Luther King Jr. described the core principle of Breadbasket as the belief that African Americans should not support businesses that denied them job opportunities, career advancement, or basic courtesy. To achieve their goals, the activists of Operation Breadbasket adopted a strategy called "selective patronage." They focused their initial campaign on dairy companies and supermarket chains. They organized pickets and encouraged boycotts of stores that carried products from the targeted companies, aiming to pressure them into improving their employment practices and support for the black community.

In 1967, Operation Breadbasket was established as a national organization, with King appointing Jackson as its national director. Within a year, the organization had successfully carried out over 40 boycotts, leading to the employment of more than 8,000 African American workers by various companies. However, although the operation achieved hiring agreements with several major corporations, it faced challenges in monitoring whether these companies actually fulfilled their commitments. Internal conflicts and the burden of responsibility on Jackson and the new leaders following King's assassination eventually led to the termination of Operation Breadbasket in December 1971.

== History ==
Operation Breadbasket was founded as a department of the Southern Christian Leadership Conference (SCLC) in 1962, and was operated by Rev. Fred C. Bennette of Atlanta. The first activities were in Atlanta and other Southern cities.

A key figure in the later history of Operation Breadbasket was Jesse Jackson. In 1964, Jackson left his native South Carolina to study at the Chicago Theological Seminary. He participated in SCLC's movement in Selma. When Jackson returned from Selma, he joined SCLC's effort to establish a beachhead in Chicago.

In 1966, SCLC selected Jackson to be head of the Chicago chapter of its Operation Breadbasket. Influenced by the example of Rev. Leon H. Sullivan in Philadelphia, a key goal of the organization was to foster "selective buying" (boycotts) as a means to pressure white businesses to hire blacks and purchase goods and services from black contractors. Sullivan's plan was not without its predecessors. One was Dr. T.R.M. Howard, a wealthy doctor and community leader on the South Side and key financial contributor to Operation Breadbasket. Before he moved from Mississippi to Chicago, Howard had developed a national reputation as a civil rights leader, surgeon, and entrepreneur.

As head of the Regional Council of Negro Leadership, Howard had successfully organized a boycott of service-stations that refused to provide restrooms for blacks. Jackson's application of these methods, however, had a seamier aspect including cronyism and strong-arming businesses to donate money to Operation Breadbasket.

Noah Robinson Jr., who had just graduated from the Wharton School of Finance and Commerce of the University of Pennsylvania, came to Chicago in 1969, to become full-time director of the Commercial Division of Operation Breadbasket. Robinson was Jesse Jackson's half-brother and sometime rival. Robinson would later be sentenced to life imprisonment for murdering a rival known as Leroy Barber.

In 1969, Jackson appointed the then-teenage Al Sharpton as youth director of Operation Breadbasket's Brooklyn branch.

In December 1971, Jackson had a falling-out with Ralph Abernathy, King's successor as head of the SCLC. Jackson and his allies broke off from SCLC and formed the wholly independent Operation PUSH (People United to Save Humanity). The founding goals were similar to those of the Operation Breadbasket. Despite Jackson's departure, Operation Breadbasket continued for a brief time under Robinson's leadership.

== Breadbasket Orchestra and Choir ==
The Breadbasket Orchestra and Choir, with Ben Branch as musical director, performed benefits for Martin Luther King Jr. and Operation/PUSH. Just moments before being assassinated, King had asked Branch to play a Negro spiritual, "Precious Lord, Take My Hand," at a rally that was to have been held two hours later.

Cannonball Adderley, in the introduction to the title track of his 1969 album Country Preacher, makes a specific mention of Branch in recognition of his work as leader of the Operation Breadbasket Orchestra and Choir.
