= 74 Miles Away =

Studio album by Cannonball Adderley
- Released: November 1967
- Recorded: June 12 and July 24, 1967
- Studio: Capitol (Hollywood)
- Genre: Jazz
- Label: Capitol
- Producer: David Axelrod

Cannonball Adderley chronology
Radio Nights (1967)	74 Miles Away (1967)	Why Am I Treated So Bad! (1967)

Professional ratings
Review scores
Source	Rating
Allmusic	4/5 stars

74 Miles Away is an album by jazz saxophonist Cannonball Adderley recorded "live" before an invited audience at Capitol Studios in Hollywood, California, in 1967, and features performances by Adderley with Nat Adderley, Joe Zawinul, Victor Gaskin and Roy McCurdy.

== Overview ==
Following these sessions, it would be almost a year before Cannonball Adderley recorded again, a significant sign that the slump in jazz fortunes of the later 1960s had begun.

The album just scraped the charts, peaking at No. 186 on the Billboard Top LPs in late 1967, during a two-week run on the chart.

== Reception ==
The Allmusic review by Richard S. Ginell awarded the album 4 stars and states "This was a rare thing, a group that could grab the public's attention and gently lead them into more difficult idioms without pandering or condescension".

== Track listing ==
No.	Title	Writer(s)	Length
1.	"Do Do Do (What Now Is Next?)"	Nat Adderley, Gail Fisher	6:20
2.	"I Remember Bird"	Leonard Feather	6:54
3.	"Walk Tall (Baby, That's What I Need)"	Queen Esther Marrow, Jim Rein, Joe Zawinul	2:38
4.	"74 Miles Away"	Zawinul	13:47
5.	"Oh Babe"	Julian "Cannonball" Adderley, Nat Adderley	5:28

- Tracks 1 & 3 recorded on June 12, 1967. Tracks 2,4,& 5 recorded July 24, 1967 at Capitol Tower, Hollywood

== Personnel ==
- Cannonball Adderley – alto saxophone
- Nat Adderley – cornet, vocal on "Oh Babe"
- Joe Zawinul – keyboards
- Victor Gaskin – bass
- Roy McCurdy – drums

== Charts ==
Chart (1967)	Peak position
US Billboard Top LPs	186
