= Country Preacher =

Live album by The Cannonball Adderley Quintet
- Released: December 1969 or January 1970
- Recorded: October 1969
- Venue: Chicago
- Genre: Jazz
- Length: 38:39
- Label: Capitol
- Producer: David Axelrod

The Cannonball Adderley Quintet chronology
Accent on Africa (1968)	Country Preacher (1969)	The Cannonball Adderley Quintet & Orchestra (1970)

Professional ratings
Review scores
Source	Rating
Allmusic	3/5 stars

Country Preacher is a live album recorded by the Cannonball Adderley Quintet in 1969.

== Overview ==
Recorded at an unidentified church meeting of the Chicago chapter of the Southern Christian Leadership Conference's Operation Breadbasket, the album spent two months in the Cash Box R&B charts in 1970.

Described by discographer and Adderley biographer Chris Sheridan as "an audible sociological record", the introduction is by the Reverend Jesse Jackson. The liner notes, written by Adderley, give some background to Operation Breadbasket and the Country Preacher.

The album is the first with bassist Booker as a member of the Quintet.

Adderley, in his introduction to the title track, mentions fellow saxophonist Ben Branch, the director of the Operation Breadbasket Orchestra and Choir.

The album reached No. 136 on the Billboard Top LPs during a twenty two-week run on the chart in 1970.

== Track listing ==
Introduction by the Reverend Jesse Jackson

1. "Walk Tall" (Zawinul, Marrow, Rein) 5:03
2. "Country Preacher" (Zawinul) 4:30
3. "Hummin'" (Nat Adderley) 6:32
4. "Oh Babe" (Nat Adderley, Julian Adderley) 4:50
5. "Afro-Spanish Omlet"
  a. Umbakwen (Nat Adderley) 4:30
  b. Soli Tomba (W. Booker) 3:03
  c. Oiga (Joe Zawinul) 4:23
  d. Marabi (Julian Adderley) 3:47
6. "The Scene" (Zawinul, Nat Adderley) 2:01

== Personnel ==
- Julian "Cannonball" Adderley - alto and soprano saxophones
- Nat Adderley - cornet and vocals on "Oh Babe"
- Joe Zawinul - keyboards
- Walter Booker - bass
- Roy McCurdy - drums

== Charts ==
Chart (1970)	Peak position
US Billboard Top LPs	136
