= Soul Zodiac =

Studio album by the Nat Adderley Sextet and Rick Holmes
- Released: 1972
- Recorded: 1972
- Studio: Independent Recording Studios (Studio City, Los Angeles, California)
- Genre: Jazz
- Length: 1:06:55
- Label: Capitol
- Producer: David Axelrod; Cannonball Adderley

Nat Adderley chronology
Calling Out Loud (1968)	Soul Zodiac (1972)	Soul of the Bible (1972)

Professional ratings
Review scores
Source	Rating
AllMusic	4/5 stars

Soul Zodiac is the first collaborative studio album by the Nat Adderley Sextet and Rick Holmes, presented by Julian "Cannonball" Adderley. It was released in 1972 through Capitol Records. Recording sessions took place at Independent Recording Studios in Studio City, Los Angeles, California with production handled by David Axelrod and Cannonball Adderley. The album features narration from Rick Holmes on all tracks and contributions from the sextet: Nat Adderley on cornet, George Duke on Fender Rhodes electric piano, Walter Booker on string bass and guitar, Roy McCurdy on drums, Mike Deasy on guitar, and Ernie Watts on flute, tenor saxophone, and tambourine, with guest appearance by Cannonball Adderley on two songs.

The album peaked at number 75 on the Billboard 200 during a twenty-week run on the albums chart, and at number 11 on the Top R&B/Hip-Hop Albums chart in the United States.

Because of the prominent production credit on the cover, the album is often mistakenly credited to Cannonball Adderley. Also, Soul Zodiac is not to be confused with Cannonball Adderley's Love, Sex, and the Zodiac.

== Track listing ==
No.	Title	Writer(s)	Length
1.	"Introduction"	Nat Adderley; Rick Holmes	3:00
2.	"Aries"	Julian "Cannonball" Adderley; Holmes	4:52
3.	"Libra"	Walter Booker; Holmes	3:15
4.	"Capricorn"	George Duke; Holmes	6:10
5.	"Aquarius"	Mike Deasy; Holmes	7:47
6.	"Pisces"	N. Adderley; Ernie Watts; Holmes	3:53
7.	"Sagittarius"	Roy McCurdy; Holmes	5:15
8.	"Gemini"	N. Adderley; Booker; McCurdy; Holmes	3:45
9.	"Leo"	N. Adderley; Holmes	2:51
10.	"Virgo"	Duke; Deasy; Holmes	4:10
11.	"Scorpio"	Watts; Holmes	4:23
12.	"Cancer"	N. Adderley; Booker; McCurdy; Holmes	2:45
13.	"Taurus"	N. Adderley; J. Adderley; Holmes	13:52
Total length:			1:06:55

== Personnel ==
Musicians

- Nat Adderley – cornet
- Julian "Cannonball" Adderley – alto saxophone (track 2), soprano saxophone (track 3), presenter
- George Duke – Fender Rhodes electric piano
- Walter Booker – string bass, guitar
- Roy McCurdy – drums
- Ernie Watts – tenor saxophone, flute, tambourine
- Mike Deasy – guitar
- Rick Holmes – narration

Production

- Cannonball Adderley – producer
- David Axelrod – producer
- Howard Gale – engineer
- John Hoernle – art direction
- Richard Rankin – photography

== Chart history ==
Chart (1972)	Peak position
US Billboard 200	75
US Top R&B/Hip-Hop Albums (Billboard)	11
