= The Price You Got to Pay to Be Free =

Live album with studio tracks by Cannonball Adderley
- Released: December 1970
- Recorded: September 19, 1970 (live); October 5 & 6, 1970 (studio)
- Venue: Monterey Jazz Festival
- Studio: Capitol (Hollywood)
- Genre: Jazz
- Label: Capitol
- Producer: David Axelrod

Cannonball Adderley chronology
Love, Sex, and the Zodiac (1970)	The Price You Got to Pay to Be Free (1970)	The Happy People (1970)

Professional ratings
Review scores
Source	Rating
Allmusic	3.5/5 stars

The Price You Got to Pay to Be Free is an album by the Cannonball Adderley Quintet recorded, in part, at the 1970 Monterey Jazz Festival.

== Overview ==
A portion of the performance is memorialized in the 1971 Clint Eastwood movie Play Misty For Me. Additional "live in-studio" tracks were recorded the following month at the Capitol Records Tower, in Hollywood, to stretch the Monterey material into a double album. The album features Adderley with brother Nat Adderley, Joe Zawinul, Walter Booker and Roy McCurdy and guest appearances by Bob West and Cannon's 15-year-old nephew Nat Adderley Jr. who wrote and performed the gospel-influenced protest title song.

== Chart performance ==
The album peaked at No. 169 on the Billboard Top LPs in early 1971, during a two-week stay.

== Reception ==
The Allmusic review by Richard S. Ginell awarded the album 3½ stars and states: "Cannonball was a populist at heart, and his generosity of spirit shines through this often deliciously diverse album, which ranges wildly from flat-out soul to Brazilian music to a cautious toedip into the avant-garde.... This is a fascinating contemporary snapshot of the Quintet, whose later recordings are too casually dismissed these days."

== Track listing ==
All compositions by Julian "Cannonball" Adderley except as indicated

1. "Soul Virgo" (George Duke, Mike Deasy, Rick Holmes) - 1:46
2. "Rumplestiltskin" (Joe Zawinul) - 5:11
3. "Inquisition" (Nat Adderley) - 2:25
4. "Devastatement" (Nat Adderley) - 2:55
5. "Pra Dizer Adeus (To Say Goodbye)" (Edú Lobo, Torquato Neto, Lani Hall) - 2:49
6. "The Price You Got to Pay to Be Free" (Nat Adderley Jr.) - 4:40
7. "Sometime Ago" (Sergio Mihanovich) - 4:12
8. "Exquisition" (Nat Adderley) - 4:15
9. "Painted Desert" (Joe Zawinul) - 5:55
10. "Directions" (Zawinul) - 1:35
11. "Down in Black Bottom" (Nat Adderley) - 5:17
12. "1-2-3-Go-O-O-O!" (Zawinul, McCurdy, Booker, Nat Adderley) - 4:41
13. "Lonesome Stranger" (Nat Adderley) - 2:01
14. "Get Up Off Your Knees" - 4:59
15. "Wild-Cat Pee" - 3:22
16. "Alto Sex" - 2:10
17. "Bridges" (Milton Nascimento, Fernando Brant, Gene Lees) - 4:21
18. "Out and In" - 5:48
19. "Together" (Nat Adderley Jr.) - 6:31
20. "The Scene" (Nat Adderley, Zawinul) - 0:36

- Recorded September 19, 1970 at the Monterey Jazz Festival (tracks 1,2,3,4,5,6,7,13,17,19,20)
- Recorded October 5, 1970 at Capitol Studios (tracks 8,9,10,11,18)
- Recorded October 6, 1970 at Capitol Studios (tracks 12,14,15,16)

== Personnel ==
- Cannonball Adderley - alto saxophone, soprano saxophone, vocals
- Nat Adderley - cornet, vocals
- Joe Zawinul - piano, electric piano, ring modulator
- Walter Booker - bass
- Roy McCurdy - drums
- Nat Adderley Jr. - piano, electric piano, guitar, vocals
- Bob West - bass

== Charts ==
Chart (1971)	Peak position
US Billboard Top LPs	169
