= Roy McCurdy =

American jazz drummer

- Born: November 28, 1936 (age 89); Rochester, New York, U.S.
- Genres: Jazz
- Occupation: Musician
- Instruments: Drums, guitar

Roy McCurdy (born November 28, 1936) is a jazz drummer.

== Early life ==
McCurdy began playing drums around the age of 10 in his hometown of Rochester and took lessons from Eastman percussionist Bill Street as a teenager. He spent three years in the Air Force before returning to Rochester to begin his career.

== Career ==
Before joining Cannonball Adderley's Quintet in 1965 and staying with the band until Adderley's death in 1975, he had played with Chuck and Gap Mangione in the Jazz Brothers (1960–1961), as well as with Bobby Timmons, Betty Carter and Sonny Rollins (1963–1964), appearing on the classic 1963 album Sonny Meets Hawk!

He attended the Eastman School of Music from sixteen to eighteen, during which time he also played professionally with Roy Eldridge and with Eddie Vinson at seventeen. In 1960 he joined the Art Farmer – Benny Golson Jazztet and remained for two years.

Among the influences he cites Louie Bellson, Shelly Manne, Sam Woodyard, Buddy Rich, Papa Jo Jones, Philly Joe Jones and the bands of Duke Ellington, Jimmie Lunceford and Lionel Hampton.

He has also played and/or recorded with Count Basie, Wes Montgomery, Ella Fitzgerald, Sarah Vaughan, Carmen McRae, Joe Williams, Herbie Hancock, Oscar Peterson, Bud Powell, Art Pepper, and the jazz rock group Blood, Sweat and Tears, etc.

He appears on the classic 1983 recording Jackson, Johnson, Brown & Company featuring Milt Jackson on vibes, J. J. Johnson on trombone, Ray Brown on bass, Tom Ranier on piano, and John Collins on guitar.

As of 2010, McCurdy is an adjunct professor in the Jazz Studies Department of the Thornton School of Music at the University of Southern California in Los Angeles, California.

== Discography ==
=== As a member ===
Blood, Sweat & Tears

- Brand New Day (ABC, 1977)

=== As sideman ===
With Gap and Chuck Mangione, The Jazz Brothers

- The Jazz Brothers (Riverside, 1960)
- Hey Baby (Riverside, 1961)

With Cannonball Adderley

- Money in the Pocket (Capitol, 1966 [2005])
- Great Love Themes (Capitol, 1966)
- Mercy, Mercy, Mercy! Live at 'The Club' (Capitol, 1966)
- Cannonball in Japan (Capitol, 1966)
- Swingin' In Seattle, Live At The Penthouse (Reel to Real, 1966-67 [2019])
- Radio Nights (Night, 1967-68 [1991])
- 74 Miles Away (Capitol, 1967)
- Why Am I Treated So Bad! (Capitol, 1967)
- In Person (Capitol, 1968)
- Country Preacher (Capitol, 1969)
- The Cannonball Adderley Quintet & Orchestra (Capitol, 1970)
- Love, Sex, and the Zodiac (Fantasy, 1970 [1974])
- The Price You Got to Pay to Be Free (Capitol, 1970)
- The Happy People (Capitol, 1970 [1972])
- The Black Messiah (Capitol, 1970)
- Music You All (Capitol, 1970 [1976])
- Inside Straight (Fantasy, 1973)
- Pyramid (Fantasy, 1974)
- Phenix (Fantasy, 1975)

With Nat Adderley

- Sayin' Somethin' (Atlantic, 1966)
- Live at Memory Lane (Atlantic, 1966)
- The Scavenger (Milestone, 1968)
- Soul Zodiac (Capitol, 1972)
- Soul of the Bible (Capitol, 1972)
- Double Exposure (Capitol, 1974)
- A Little New York Midtown Music (Galaxy, 1979)

With Gene Ammons

- Brasswind (Prestige, 1974)

With Count Basie

- Mostly Blues...and Some Others (Pablo, 1983)

With Benny Carter

- Benny Carter Songbook (MusicMasters, 1996)
- Benny Carter Songbook Volume II (MusicMasters, 1997)

With Betty Carter

- Inside Betty Carter (United Artists, 1964)

With Art Farmer

- Perception (Argo, 1961)
- Here and Now (Mercury, 1962) – with Benny Golson
- Another Git Together (Mercury, 1962) – with Benny Golson

With Benny Golson

- California Message (Baystate, 1981) with Curtis Fuller
- One More Mem'ry (Baystate, 1982) with Curtis Fuller

With Herbie Mann and Tamiko Jones

- A Mann & A Woman (Atlantic, 1966)

With Mark Murphy

- Bop for Kerouac (Muse, 1981)

With Kenny Rankin

- After the Roses (Atlantic, 1980)
- Professional Dreamer (Private Music, 1995)

With Shorty Rogers and Bud Shank

- Yesterday, Today and Forever (Concord Jazz, 1983)

With Sonny Rollins

- Sonny Meets Hawk! (RCA Victor, 1963)
- Now's the Time (RCA Victor, 1964)
- Nucleus (Milestone, 1975)

With Bobby Timmons

- Sweet and Soulful Sounds (Riverside, 1963)

With Eddie "Cleanhead" Vinson

- I Want a Little Girl (Pablo, 1981)

With Joe Williams

- Joe Williams Live (Fantasy, 1973)

With Michael Wolff

- Portraiture, The Blues Period (Fuel 2000 FLD-1004, 1997)

With Betty Bennett

- The Song Is You (1990) with Bob Cooper, Mundell Lowe, George Cables, Monty Budwig and Roy McCurdy.
