= Brasswind =

Studio album by Gene Ammons
- Released: 1974
- Recorded: October 30, 1973 and February 13, 1974
- Studios: Fantasy Studios, Berkeley, California
- Genre: Jazz
- Labels: Prestige; P 10080
- Producer: Orrin Keepnews

Gene Ammons chronology
Together Again for the Last Time (1973)	Brasswind (1974)	Goodbye (1974)

Brasswind is an album by saxophonist Gene Ammons recorded in late 1973 and early 1974 and released on the Prestige label.

== Reception ==
The Allmusic review by Scott Yanow states, "Ammons plays well and even if the arrangements are somewhat dated (George Duke's keyboards do not help), this set has its strong moments".

== Track listing ==
All compositions by Gene Ammons except where noted.

1. "Cántaro" (David Axelrod) – 3:58
2. "Brasswind" – 5:03
3. "Solitario" (Axelrod) – 5:47
4. "Cariba" (Wes Montgomery) – 4:57
5. "Once I Loved" (Antonio Carlos Jobim) – 6:15
6. "'Round Midnight" (Thelonious Monk) – 7:53
7. "Rozzie" – 4:40

== Personnel ==
- Gene Ammons – tenor saxophone
- Allen DeRienzo, Snooky Young – trumpet
- George Bohanon – trombone
- Prince Lasha – alto flute (tracks 2 & 3)
- Bill Green, Jay Migliori – flute, alto flute, alto saxophone
- Jim Horn – flute, alto flute, baritone saxophone
- George Duke – keyboards
- Michael Howell, Don Peake (tracks 1, 2, 4, 5 & 7) – guitar
- Carol Kaye – electric bass (tracks 1, 2, 4, 5 & 7)
- Walter Booker – bass (tracks 3 & 6)
- John Guerin (tracks 1, 2, 4, 5 & 7), Roy McCurdy (tracks 3 & 6) – drums
- Berkeley Nash – percussion (tracks 1, 2, 4, 5 & 7)
- David Axelrod – arranger, conductor
