= Pyramid (Cannonball Adderley album) =

Studio album by Cannonball Adderley
- Released: 1974
- Recorded: 1974
- Studio: Fantasy (Berkeley)
- Genre: Jazz
- Length: 35:36
- Label: Fantasy
- Producer: David Axelrod

Cannonball Adderley chronology
Inside Straight (1973)	Pyramid (1974)	Phenix (1975)

Pyramid is an album by jazz saxophonist Cannonball Adderley recorded at Fantasy Studios in Berkeley, California in 1974 featuring performances by Adderley's Quintet with Nat Adderley, Hal Galper, Walter Booker and Roy McCurdy with guest appearances by Phil Upchurch, George Duke, and Jimmy Jones.

== Reception ==
The Allmusic review by Scott Yanow awarded the album 3 stars and states: "Cannonball Adderley is in generally good form on this 1974 recording.... Nothing too earthshattering occurs but this is an improvement over many of Adderley's Capitol recordings." The Penguin Guide to Jazz awarded the album 2½ stars.

Professional ratings
Review scores
Source	Rating
Allmusic	3/5 stars
The Penguin Guide to Jazz	2.5/4 stars
The Rolling Stone Jazz Record Guide	1/5 stars

== Track listing ==
All compositions by Julian "Cannonball" Adderley except as indicated

1. "Phases" (Hal Galper) - 6:00
2. "My Lady Blue" (Galper) - 4:45
3. "Book-Ends" (David Axelrod) - 5:35
4. "Pyramid" - 3:40
5. "Suite Cannon: The King and I" - 3:13
6. "Suite Cannon: Time In" - 4:33
7. "Suite Cannon: For Melvin Lastie" - 2:36
8. "Oh Bess, Oh Where's My Bess?" (George Gershwin, Ira Gershwin) - 3:36
- Recorded at Fantasy Studios in Berkeley, CA, in 1974

== Personnel ==
- Cannonball Adderley - alto saxophone
- Nat Adderley - cornet
- Hal Galper - electric piano
- Walter Booker - bass
- Roy McCurdy - drums
- Phil Upchurch - guitar
- George Duke - clavinet, ARP synthesizer
- Jimmy Jones - piano (track 8)
