= Double Exposure (Nat Adderley album) =

Studio album by Nat Adderley
- Released: 1975
- Recorded: 1974
- Genre: Jazz
- Label: Prestige
- Producer: Cannonball Adderley & David Axelrod

Nat Adderley chronology
Soul of the Bible (1972)	Double Exposure (1975)	Don't Look Back (1976)

Double Exposure is an album by jazz cornetist Nat Adderley released on the Prestige label featuring performances by Adderley's Sextet with Bill Fender, George Duke, Walter Booker, King Errison, and Roy McCurdy with guest artists including Cannonball Adderley and Johnny "Guitar" Watson.

== Reception ==
The Allmusic review awarded the album 2½ stars.

Professional ratings
Review scores
Source	Rating
Allmusic	2.5/5 stars
The Rolling Stone Jazz Record Guide	3/5 stars

== Track listing ==
All compositions by Nat Adderley except where noted.

1. "Watermelon Man" (Herbie Hancock) – 3:37
2. "Quit It" (Miriam Makeba, Caiphus Semenya) – 3:46
3. "59 Go and Pass" – 4:20
4. "Conant 19" – 5:02
5. "Traffic" (Cannonball Adderley) – 4:05
6. "In a Silent Way" (Joe Zawinul) – 5:20
7. "Song of the Valdez Diamond" (Earl McIntyre) – 6:31

== Personnel ==
- Nat Adderley – cornet, vocals
- George Duke – electric piano, piano, ARP synthesizer
- Bill Fender – guitar
- Walter Booker – string bass
- Roy McCurdy – drums
- King Errison – percussion
- Cannonball Adderley – alto saxophone (tracks 4 & 5)
- Johnny Watson – guitar solo (tracks 1 & 3), electric bass (track 5)
- Hal Galper – piano (track 4)
- Don Peake – rhythm guitar (tracks 1 & 3)
- Allen DeRienzo, Snooky Young, Oscar Brashear – trumpet (track 1)
- George Bohanon, Dick Hyde – trombone (track 1)
- William Green, Jackie Kelso, Jay Migliori – saxophone, flute (track 1)
- Jack Shulman, Gareth Nuttycombe, Alexander Neiman, Henry Roth, Williman Hymanson, Jerome Reisler, Nathan Gershman, Walter Rower – string section (tracks 2 & 6)
- Stephanie Spruill, Jody Mathis, Billie Barnum – background singers (track 2)
