= Why Am I Treated So Bad! =

Studio album by The Cannonball Adderley Quintet
- Released: May 1967
- Recorded: March 6 & 23, 1967
- Studio: Capitol (Hollywood)
- Genre: Jazz
- Label: Capitol
- Producer: David Axelrod

The Cannonball Adderley Quintet chronology
74 Miles Away (1967)	Why Am I Treated So Bad! (1967)	In Person (1968)

Professional ratings
Review scores
Source	Rating
Allmusic	4.5/5 stars
The Penguin Guide to Jazz	3/4 stars

Why Am I Treated So Bad! is an album by the Cannonball Adderley Quintet, recorded at the Capitol Studios in Hollywood in 1967.

== Overview ==
The song "I'm on My Way", was written by his nephew Nat Adderley Jr., who at the time was an 11-year-old living in Teaneck, New Jersey.

The album peaked at No. 154 on the Billboard Top LPs during a twelve-week run on the chart.

== Track listing ==
(CD re-issue)

1. "Introduction" – 0:13
2. "Mini Mama" (Curtis Fuller) – 6:41
3. "I'm on My Way" (Nat Adderley Jr.) – 7:49
4. "Why Am I Treated So Bad" (Roebuck Staples) - 7:47
5. "One for Newk" (Josef Zawinul) – 5:15
6. "Yvette" (Josef Zawinul) – 2:21
7. "The Other Side" (Nat Adderley) – 9:04
8. "The Scene" (Josef Zawinul) – 2:39
9. "Heads Up! Feet Down!" (Jimmy Heath) – 7:00
10. "The Girl Next Door" (Hugh Martin, Ralph Blane) – 12:07

== Personnel ==
- Julian "Cannonball" Adderley – alto sax
- Nat Adderley – cornet
- Joe Zawinul – acoustic & electric piano
- Victor Gaskin – bass
- Roy McCurdy – drums

== Charts ==
Chart (1967)	Peak position
US Billboard Top LPs	154
