= The Black Messiah =

Live album by Cannonball Adderley
- Released: November 1971
- Recorded: August 3–9, 1971
- Genre: Jazz, jazz rock
- Length: 87:32
- Label: Capitol
- Producer: David Axelrod

Cannonball Adderley chronology
The Happy People (1972)	The Black Messiah (1971)	Music You All (1976)

Professional ratings
Review scores
Source	Rating
Allmusic	4/5 stars
DownBeat	4.5/5 stars

The Black Messiah is a live album by jazz saxophonist Cannonball Adderley recorded at The Troubadour in Los Angeles, California in 1971 featuring performances by Adderley's Quintet with Nat Adderley, George Duke, Walter Booker and Roy McCurdy with guest appearances by Airto Moreira, Mike Deasy, Ernie Watts, Alvin Batiste, and Buck Clarke. After many years of being out of print, The Black Messiah was reissued in 2014 by Real Gone Music; the new 2CD reissue included liner notes by music journalist/blogger Bill Kopp.

== Chart performance ==
The album was one of his last charting ones, it peaked at No. 167 on the Billboard Top LPs in early 1972, during a three-week stay on the chart.

== Reception ==
The Allmusic review by Richard S. Ginell awarded the album 4 stars and states: "Still immersed in the burgeoning electronic jazz-rock explosion of the times, Cannonball Adderley goes further toward a rapprochement with the rock and soul audiences than ever before on this fascinating, overlooked double album."

== Track listing ==
All compositions by Julian "Cannonball" Adderley except as indicated

1. Introduction – 0:50
2. "Black Messiah" (George Duke) – 16:12
3. Monologue – 2:20
4. "Little Benny Hen" (Mike Deasy) – 4:15
5. "Zanek" (Deasy) – 5:07
6. "Dr. Honoris Causa" (Joe Zawinul) – 14:48
7. "The Chocolate Nuisance" (Nat Adderley, Roy McCurdy) – 8:22
8. "Untitled" (Airto Moreira) – 6:21
9. "The Steam Drill" – 8:42
10. "Eyes of the Cosmos" (Ernie Watts) – 4:51
11. "Episode from the Music Came" (Alvin Batiste) – 2:39
12. "Heritage" (Duke Ellington) – 4:43
13. "Circumference" (Duke) – 3:18
14. "Pretty Paul" – 2:48
15. "The Scene" (Nat Adderley, Zawinul) – 2:16

- Recorded August 3–9, 1971 at The Troubadour in West Hollywood, CA.

== Personnel ==
- Cannonball Adderley – alto saxophone, soprano saxophone
- Nat Adderley – cornet, vocals
- George Duke – piano
- Walter Booker – bass
- Roy McCurdy – drums
- Airto Moreira – percussion
- Mike Deasy – guitar, vocals (tracks 4, 5, 7, 10, 11 & 13–15)
- Ernie Watts – tenor saxophone (tracks 4, 5, 8, 10, 11 & 13–15)
- Alvin Batiste – clarinet (tracks 11 & 13–15)
- Buck Clarke – African percussion (tracks 7 & 13–15)

== Charts ==
Chart (1972)	Peak position
US Billboard Top LPs	167
