= Walter Booker =

American jazz double bassist (1933–2006)

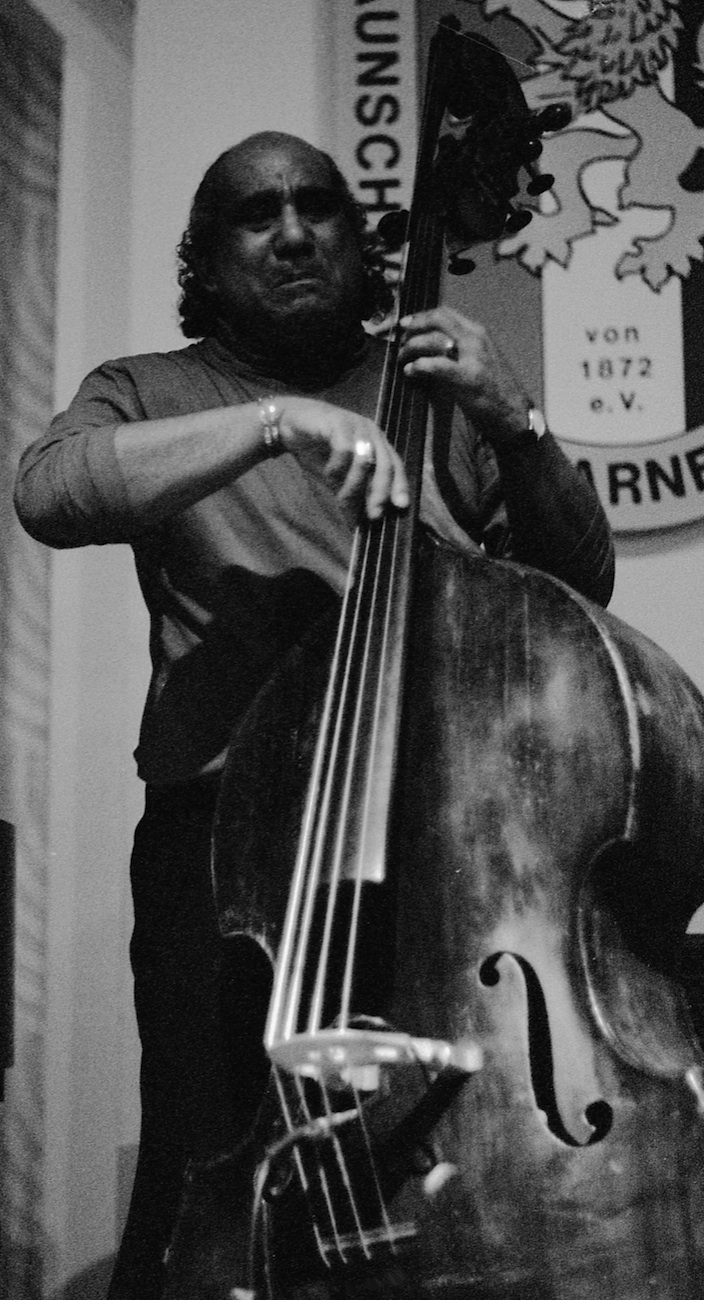

Background information
- Born: Walter Booker; December 17, 1933; Prairie View, Texas, U.S.
- Died: November 24, 2006 (aged 72) Manhattan, New York
- Genres: Jazz
- Occupation: Musician
- Instrument: Double bass
- Formerly of: Cannonball Adderley

Walter Booker (December 17, 1933 – November 24, 2006) was an American jazz musician. A native of Prairie View, Texas, his playing was marked by voice-like inflections, glissandos and tremolo techniques.

== Biography ==
Booker moved with his family to Washington, D.C. in the mid-1940s. He played clarinet and alto sax in college with a concert band. In 1959 he began on bass while in the US Army while serving in the same unit as Elvis Presley. He worked with Andrew White in Washington after his discharge, playing in the JFK Quintet during the early 1960s.

In 1964 Booker moved to New York City, being hired by Donald Byrd. After that, he recorded and toured with Ray Bryant, Betty Carter, Chick Corea, Stan Getz, Art Farmer, Milt Jackson, Thelonious Monk and Sonny Rollins, before joining the Cannonball Adderley Quintet in 1969, starting an association which lasted until Adderley's death in 1975. He then toured the United States with the Shirley Horn Trio, along with Billy Hart on drums. During the same time, Booker designed, built, and ran the Boogie Woogie Studio in NYC, a mecca for musicians from all over the world, and through the 1980s, he played and recorded with Nat Adderley, Nick Brignola, Arnett Cobb, Richie Cole, John Hicks, Billy Higgins, Clifford Jordan, Pharoah Sanders, Sarah Vaughan, and Phil Woods.

Booker was first married to Maria Booker, but separated just after the recording of Wayne Shorter's Super Nova. Then he married the pianist Bertha Hope with whom he played in a trio that included drummer Jimmy Cobb. Booker died in his Manhattan, New York home on November 24, 2006, at the age of 72.

== Discography ==
=== As leader ===
- 2000: Bookie's Cookbook (with Leroy Williams, Cecil Payne, Marcus Belgrave, Roni Ben-Hur, Larry Willis)

=== As sideman ===
With Cannonball Adderley

- Country Preacher (Capitol, 1969)
- The Cannonball Adderley Quintet & Orchestra (Capitol, 1970)
- Love, Sex, and the Zodiac (Fantasy, 1970)
- The Price You Got to Pay to Be Free (Capitol, 1970)
- The Happy People (Capitol, 1970)
- The Black Messiah (Capitol, 1972)
- Inside Straight (Fantasy, 1973)
- Pyramid (Fantasy, 1974)
- Phenix (Fantasy, 1975)
- Music You All 1976

With Nat Adderley

- Soul Zodiac (Capitol Records, 1972)
- Soul of the Bible (Capitol, 1972)
- Double Exposure (Prestige, 1975)
- On the Move (Theresa, 1983)
- Blue Autumn (Theresa, 1983)
- We Remember Cannon (In + Out, 1989)
- Autumn Leaves (Sweet Basil, 1990)
- Work Song: Live at Sweet Basil (Sweet Basil, 1990 [1993])
- Talkin' About You (Landmark, 1990 [1991])
- Mercy Mercy Mercy (Evidence)

With Nick Brignola

- Burn Brigade (Bee Hive, 1979)

With Ray Bryant

- Gotta Travel On (Cadet, 1966)

With Donald Byrd

- Mustang! (Blue Note, 1966)
- Blackjack (Blue Note, 1967)
- Slow Drag (Blue Note, 1967)

With Junior Cook

- Good Cookin' (Muse, 1979)
- On a Misty Night (SteepleChase, 1989)

With Art Farmer

- The Time and the Place: The Lost Concert (Mosaic, 1966 [2007])
- The Time and the Place (Columbia, 1967)
- The Art Farmer Quintet Plays the Great Jazz Hits (Columbia, 1967)

With Ricky Ford

- Flying Colors (Muse, 1980)
- Interpretations (Muse, 1982)

With John Hicks

- After the Morning (West 54, 1979)
- Some Other Time (Theresa, 1981)
- In Concert (Theresa, 1984 [1986])
- Inc. 1 (DIW, 1985)
- Rhythm-a-Ning (Candid, 1989) with Kenny Barron
- Single Petal of a Rose (Mapleshade, 1992)
- Gentle Rain (Sound Hills, 1994)

With Ronnie Mathews

- Legacy (Bee Hive, 1979)

With David "Fathead" Newman

- Still Hard Times (Muse, 1982)

With Harold Vick

- The Caribbean Suite (RCA Victor, 1966)
- Straight Up (RCA Victor, 1967)

Others

- Gene Ammons: Brasswind (Prestige, 1974)
- Kenny Barron: Kenny Barron / John Hicks Quartet - Rhymthm-A-Ning (Candid, 1989)
- Joe Chambers: The Almoravid (Muse, 1974)
- Stanley Cowell: Departure No. 2 (Steeplechase, 1990)
- Stan Getz: What the World Needs Now: Stan Getz Plays Burt Bacharach and Hal David (Verve, 1968)
- Roy Hargrove: Family (Verve, 1995)
- John Hicks and Elise Wood: Luminous (Nilva, 1985–88)
- Andrew Hill: Change (Blue Note, 1966 [2007])
- Billy Higgins: The Soldier (Timeless, 1979 [1981])
- Milt Jackson: Born Free (Limelight, 1966)
- Clifford Jordan: Repetition (Soul Note, 1984)
- Pete La Roca – Turkish Women at the Bath (Douglas, 1967)
- Charles McPherson: Horizons (Prestige, 1968)
- Hank Mobley – Third Season (Blue Note, 1967)
- Lee Morgan: The Procrastinator (Blue Note, 1967)
- Pharoah Sanders: Pharoah Sanders Live... (Theresa, 1982)
- Archie Shepp: The Way Ahead (Impulse!, 1968)
- Wayne Shorter: Super Nova (Blue Note, 1969)
- Norris Turney: Big, Sweet 'n Blue – with Larry Willis and Jimmy Cobb (Mapleshade Records, 1993)
- Joe Williams: Joe Williams Live (Fantasy, 1973)
- Joe Zawinul: Zawinul (Atlantic, 1970)

=== As songwriter ===
- "Soli Tomba" on Cannonball Adderley Quintet album Country Preacher (1969)
