= Inside Straight (album) =

Live album by Cannonball Adderley
- Released: 1973
- Recorded: June 4, 1973
- Studio: Fantasy (Berkeley)
- Genre: Jazz
- Length: 39:16
- Label: Fantasy
- Producer: David Axelrod

Cannonball Adderley chronology
Music You All (1976)	Inside Straight (1973)	Pyramid (1974)

Alternative cover
- CD reissue cover

Inside Straight is a live album by jazz saxophonist Cannonball Adderley recorded at the Fantasy Studios in Berkeley, California in 1973 featuring performances by Adderley's Quintet with Nat Adderley, Hal Galper, Walter Booker and Roy McCurdy with guest percussionist King Errisson.

== Reception ==
Professional ratings
Review scores
Source	Rating
AllMusic	3.5/5 stars
The Penguin Guide to Jazz	3/4 stars
The Rolling Stone Jazz Record Guide	2/5 stars

The AllMusic review by Scott Yanow awarded the album 3½ stars and states "After seven years with Capitol, Cannonball Adderley switched labels to Fantasy where he reunited with producer Orrin Keepnews and the quality of his music immediately improved". The Penguin Guide to Jazz awarded the album 3 stars stating "This was one of his live-in-the-studio sessions with a late edition of the band. Galper plays smart, probing electric piano and Booker and McCurdy generate considerable heat".

== Track listing ==
All compositions by Julian "Cannonball" Adderley & Nat Adderley except as indicated

1. Introduction by Bill Hall, KDIA (San Francisco) – 0:19
2. "Inside Straight" – 3:19
3. "Saudade" (Walter Booker) – 7:47
4. "Inner Journey" (Hal Galper) – 8:28
5. "Snakin' the Grass" (Galper) – 6:24
6. "Five of a Kind" (Nat Adderley) – 5:27
7. "Second Son" (Galper) – 6:26
8. "The End" – 1:06

- Recorded at Fantasy Studio A in Berkeley, California on June 4, 1973

== Personnel ==
- Cannonball Adderley – alto saxophone
- Nat Adderley – cornet
- Hal Galper – electric piano
- Walter Booker – bass
- Roy McCurdy – drums
- King Errisson – percussion
