= The Cannonball Adderley Quintet & Orchestra =

Studio album by Cannonball Adderley
- Released: August 1970
- Recorded: June, 1970 in Los Angeles, CA
- Genre: Jazz
- Length: 45:17
- Label: Capitol
- Producer: David Axelrod

Cannonball Adderley chronology
| Country Preacher (1969) | The Cannonball Adderley Quintet & Orchestra (1970) | Love, Sex, and the Zodiac (1970) |

Professional ratings
Review scores
| Source | Rating |
|---|---|
| Allmusic | 3/5 stars |

The Cannonball Adderley Quintet & Orchestra (also known as Experience in E and Experience, Tensity, Dialogue) is an album by jazz saxophonist Cannonball Adderley recorded in Los Angeles, California in 1970 featuring performances by Adderley's Quintet featuring Nat Adderley, Joe Zawinul, Walter Booker and Roy McCurdy with an unidentified orchestra conducted by William S. Fischer or Lalo Schifrin.

== Reception ==
The Allmusic review awarded the album 3 stars.

== Chart performance ==
The album peaked at No. 194 on the Billboard Top LPs during a two-week stay on the chart.

== Track listing ==
1. "Experience in E" (Joe Zawinul, William Fischer) – 20:00
2. "Tensity" (David Axelrod) – 12:38
3. "Dialogues for Jazz Quintet and Orchestra" (Lalo Schifrin) – 12:39

== Personnel ==
Cannonball Adderley Quintet

- Cannonball Adderley - alto saxophone
- Nat Adderley - cornet
- Joe Zawinul - piano, electric piano
- Walter Booker - bass
- Roy McCurdy - drums

Plus

- William S. Fischer - conductor (tracks 1 & 2)
- Lalo Schifrin - conductor (track 3)
- Unidentified orchestra

== Charts ==
| Chart (1970) | Peak position |
|---|---|
| US Billboard Top LPs | 194 |
