= Radio Nights =

Live album by the Cannonball Adderley Quartet, Quintet and Sextet
- Released: 1991
- Recorded: December 1967, January 1968
- Venue: The Half Note Club, New York City
- Genre: Jazz
- Label: Night
- Producer: Joel Dorn

The Cannonball Adderley Quartet, Quintet and Sextet chronology
Cannonball in Japan (1966)	Radio Nights (1991)	74 Miles Away (1967)

Radio Nights is an album released in 1991 featuring previously unreleased live radio broadcasts by the Cannonball Adderley Quartet, Quintet and Sextet from New York City's Half Note Club jazz club. They were recorded by Alan Grant and broadcast live on radio in the last week of 1967 and the first week of 1968. The montage of Adderley's monologues are taken from a recording made at the Keystone Korner jazz club, San Francisco. At the time of the recordings, Adderley was under contract to Capitol.

== Reception ==
Professional ratings
Review scores
Source	Rating
AllMusic	2.5/5 stars
The Penguin Guide to Jazz	3/4 stars

The Penguin Guide to Jazz described it as "a well-travelled private recording from the Half Note, entertaining but slightly mechanical". The AllMusic reviewer suggested that the album was better than Adderley's official Capitol releases from the same time.

== Track listing ==
1. "The Little Boy With The Sad Eyes" (Nat Adderley)
2. "Midnight Mood" (Josef Zawinul, Ben Raleigh)
3. "Stars Fell On Alabama" (Frank Perkins, Mitchell Parish) 6:32
4. "Fiddler On The Roof" (Jerry Bock, Sheldon Harnick)
5. "Work Song" (Nat Adderley)
6. "The Song My Lady Sings" (Charles Lloyd)
7. "Unit Seven" (Sam Jones)
8. Cannonball Monologues on: i. "Oh Babe" (Nat Adderley, Julian Adderley)
  ii. "Country Preacher" (Joe Zawinul)

== Personnel ==
"Stars Fell On Alabama"

- Julian "Cannonball" Adderley - alto saxophone
- Joe Zawinul - piano
- Sam Jones - bass
- Roy McCurdy - drums

"The Little Boy With The Sad Eyes", "Midnight Mood", "Fiddler On The Roof"

- Julian "Cannonball" Adderley - alto saxophone
- Nat Adderley - cornet
- Joe Zawinul - piano
- Sam Jones - bass
- Roy McCurdy - drums

"Work Song", "The Song My Lady Sings", "Unit Seven"

- Julian "Cannonball" Adderley - alto saxophone
- Nat Adderley - cornet
- Charles Lloyd - tenor saxophone
- Joe Zawinul - keyboards
- Sam Jones - bass
- Louis Hayes - drums
