= Love, Sex, and the Zodiac =

Studio album by Cannonball Adderley
- Released: April 1974
- Recorded: 1970
- Genre: Jazz
- Label: Fantasy
- Producer: David Axelrod

Cannonball Adderley chronology
The Cannonball Adderley Quintet & Orchestra (1970)	Love, Sex, and the Zodiac (1974)	The Price You Got to Pay to Be Free (1970)

Love, Sex, and the Zodiac is an album by jazz saxophonist Cannonball Adderley recorded in Berkeley, California in 1970, but not released on the Fantasy label until 1974, featuring performances by Adderley's Quintet featuring Nat Adderley, Hal Galper, Walter Booker and Roy McCurdy with guest appearances by George Duke and Jimmy Jones and narration by Los Angeles DJ Rick Holmes.

== Reception ==
The Allmusic review awarded the album 1 star, stating that "The end result is too frivolous to find favor with those who take astrology seriously, yet too serious-minded to be nearly as funny as intentional parodies of self-helpish narratives".

Professional ratings
Review scores
Source	Rating
Allmusic	1/5 stars
The Rolling Stone Jazz Record Guide	1/5 stars

== Track listing ==
1. "Introduction" (Hal Galper) -
2. "Aries: Damn Right" (George Duke) -
3. "Taurus: Wampus Cat" (Walter Booker) -
4. "Gemini: Ecstasy" (Julian "Cannonball" Adderley, Jimmy Jones) -
5. "Cancer: All Sides" (Nat Adderley) -
6. "Leo: Rosebud" (Galper) -
7. "Virgo: For Pam" (Galper) -
8. "Libra: Patricia" (Roy McCurdy) -
9. "Scorpio: Back "A" Town (Nat Adderley) -
10. "Sagittarius: West Texas" (Nat Adderley) -
11. "Capricorn: The Gentle" (Nat Adderley) -
12. "Aquarius: Humanity Plus" (Julian "Cannonball" Adderley, Nat Adderley) -
13. "Pisces: Allison's Trip" (Nat Adderley) -

- Recorded in Berkeley, CA in 1970

== Personnel ==
- Cannonball Adderley - alto saxophone
- Nat Adderley - cornet
- Hal Galper - electric piano
- Walter Booker - bass
- Roy McCurdy - drums
- George Duke - clavinet, ARP synthesizer
- Jimmy Jones - piano
- Rick Holmes - narration
