= Music You All =

Music, You All

Live album by The Cannonball Adderley Quintet
- Released: 1976
- Recorded: 1972
- Venue: The Troubadour, Los Angeles, California
- Genre: Jazz-funk
- Length: 49:49
- Label: Capitol
- Producer: David Axelrod; Cannonball Adderley

Cannonball Adderley chronology
The Black Messiah (1972)	Music, You All (1976)	Inside Straight (1973)

Professional ratings
Review scores
Source	Rating
AllMusic	4/5 stars
The Rolling Stone Jazz Record Guide	3/5 stars

Music, You All is a live album by the Cannonball Adderley Quintet, a band led by jazz saxophonist Julian "Cannonball" Adderley. Recorded at the Troubadour in West Hollywood, California in 1972 at the same sessions that produced The Black Messiah, it was released in 1976 through Capitol Records. It features contributions from the quintet: Cannonball Adderley on saxophone, George Duke on piano, Walter Booker on bass, Roy McCurdy on drums and Nat Adderley on cornet, with guest appearances from Airto Moreira, Mike Deasy and Ernie Watts.

== Track listing ==
No.	Title	Writer(s)	Length
1.	"The Brakes"	Nat Adderley; Roy McCurdy	11:58
2.	"Cannon Raps"	Julian "Cannonball" Adderley	2:23
3.	"Capricorn"	George Duke	5:25
4.	"Walk Tall"	Esther Marrow; James Rein; Joe Zawinul	5:42
5.	"Oh, Babe"	Julian "Cannonball" Adderley; Nat Adderley	8:27
6.	"Cannon Raps"	Julian "Cannonball" Adderley	2:15
7.	"Music, You All"	Julian "Cannonball" Adderley; Ernie Watts	11:03
8.	"The Scene"	Nat Adderley; Joe Zawinul	2:36
Total length:			49:49

== Personnel ==
The Cannonball Adderley Quintet

- Julian "Cannonball" Adderley – alto saxophone, producer
- Nathaniel Carlyle "Nat" Adderley – cornet
- George Duke – piano
- Walter Booker – bass
- Roy McCurdy – drums

Additional musicians

- Airto Moreira – percussion
- Mike Deasy – electric guitar
- Ernie Watts – tenor saxophone

Technical

- David Axelrod – producer
- Gene Hicks – engineering
- Wally Traugott – mastering
