= Rick Holmes =

American actor (born 1963)

- Born: Richard Holmes; March 16, 1963 (age 63); Philadelphia, Pennsylvania, U.S.
- Education: Gettysburg College (BA); New York University (MFA)

Richard "Rick" Holmes (born March 16, 1963, in Philadelphia, Pennsylvania) is an American actor. He received his BA from Gettysburg College and an MFA in acting from New York University. He has played numerous stage roles, including roles in such Broadway productions as Cabaret, Spamalot, Peter and the Starcatcher and Matilda, among others.

== Production credits ==
=== Broadway ===
- Saint Joan (1993) – English Soldier / Knight
- Timon of Athens (1993) – Hortensius
- The Government Inspector (1994) – Lyulyukov / Understudy for Artemy Zemlyanika, Luka Khlopov
- The Deep Blue Sea (1998) – Jackie Jackson / Understudy for Frederick Page
- Major Barbara (2001) – Charles Lomax
- Cabaret (2002–2004) – Clifford Bradshaw
- The Pillowman (2005) – Blind Man / Standby for Katurian and Michal
- Monty Python's Spamalot (2006–2009) – Lancelot / French Taunter / Knight of Ni / Tim The Enchanter
- Peter and the Starcatcher (2012–2013) – Lord Aster
- Matilda (2014–2015) – Mr. Wormwood
- The Visit (2015) – Father Josef
- Junk: The Golden Age of Debt (2018–2019) – Thomas Everson, Jr.

=== Off-Broadway ===
- Stop Kiss (Joseph Papp Public Theater/Susan Stein Shiva Theater) - Peter
- Dog Opera (Joseph Papp Public Theater/Martinson Hall) - Steven/Chris/David/Tim/Hank
- Clean (Atlantic Theatre)
- Christina Alberta's Father (Vineyard Theatre) - Master Bone
- Hapgood (Lincoln Center)
- Othello (Delacorte Theatre) - Ensemble
- The Tragedy of Richard III (New York Shakespeare Festival) - Lord Grey/Ensemble
- Peter and the Starcatcher (New World Stages) - Black Stache

=== National Tours ===
- Spamalot - Sir Lancelot/The French Taunter/Knight of Ni/Tim the Enchanter

- 03/07/06-04/15/06 (Colonial Theatre, Boston, MA)
- 04/19/06-06/04/06 (Cadillac Palace Theatre, Chicago, IL)
- 06/07/06-07/09/06 (National Theatre, Washington, DC)
- 07/31/15-08/02/15 (Hollywood Bowl, Los Angeles, CA)

- Cabaret
- Angels in America
- Shadow of a Gunman

=== Regional ===
- Arena Stage
- Hartford Stage
- Huntington Theatre
- Williamstown Theatre Festival
- Shakespeare Theater

=== Film ===
- The Post (2017) - Murrey Marder
- Melinda and Melinda (2004) - Party Guest (credited as Rick Vincent Holmes)
- The Stepford Wives (2004) - Bob (credited as Rick Holmes)
- Glow Ropes
- Spinster (2002) (credited as Rick Holmes)

=== TV ===
- Law & Order
- Law & Order: Special Victims Unit
- Talk to Me
- The City
- The Petrified Forest
- All My Children
- Modern Family
- The Punisher
- Atlanta
- The Politician
- Dead to Me
