= Nat Adderley Jr. =

American music arranger

- Born: May 23, 1955 (age 70); Quincy, Florida, U.S.
- Origin: West Orange, New Jersey, U.S.
- Genres: Soul, R&B, pop
- Occupations: Arranger, composer, songwriter
- Years active: 1966–present

Nathaniel Adderley Jr. (born May 23, 1955) is an American pop and rhythm and blues music arranger and pianist who spent much of his music career arranging as music director for Luther Vandross tours and contributed as co-songwriter on most of Vandross's albums.

His father Nat Adderley (1931–2000) was a composer and jazz cornet and trumpet player, while his uncle Cannonball Adderley (1928–1975) was a jazz alto saxophonist.

== Early life and education ==
Nat Adderley Jr. was born in Quincy, Florida, on May 23, 1955. The scion of a famed jazz family, he grew up in Teaneck, New Jersey, moving to that suburban New York City community with his family when he was five years old.

He started playing piano as a child and had his first song, "I'm on My Way", recorded by his uncle Cannonball on the 1967 album Why Am I Treated So Bad! by the Cannonball Adderley Quintet when the young Nat Adderley was only 11 years old.

While at the Fiorello H. LaGuardia High School of Music & Art and Performing Arts in New York City, Adderley first met Luther Vandross, who was also a student there. Adderley would end up spending much of his musical career with Vandross. He attended Yale University, graduating with a degree in African American studies.

== Career ==
While living in Houston, Texas, he was the music arranger for the 1981 album Never Too Much which became Vandross's first hit with the title track, which reached number 33 on the Billboard Hot 100 and fourth on the dance charts. He continued working with Vandross, whom he called "a hilarious guy, a great employer, a great friend, and an incredible musician", until the singer's stroke in April 2003 that effectively ended his career.

Adderley returned to his jazz roots, performing his own works, as well as tributes to both his father and uncle. He cites his influences as Chick Corea, John Coltrane and Thelonious Monk. In a 2009 interview with the Star-Ledger he said pianists "who are killing me" include Kenny Barron, Herbie Hancock, Cedar Walton and Joe Zawinul.

As of 2009, Nat Adderley Jr. was a resident of West Orange, New Jersey.
