= Queen Esther Marrow =

American soul and gospel singer (born 1941)

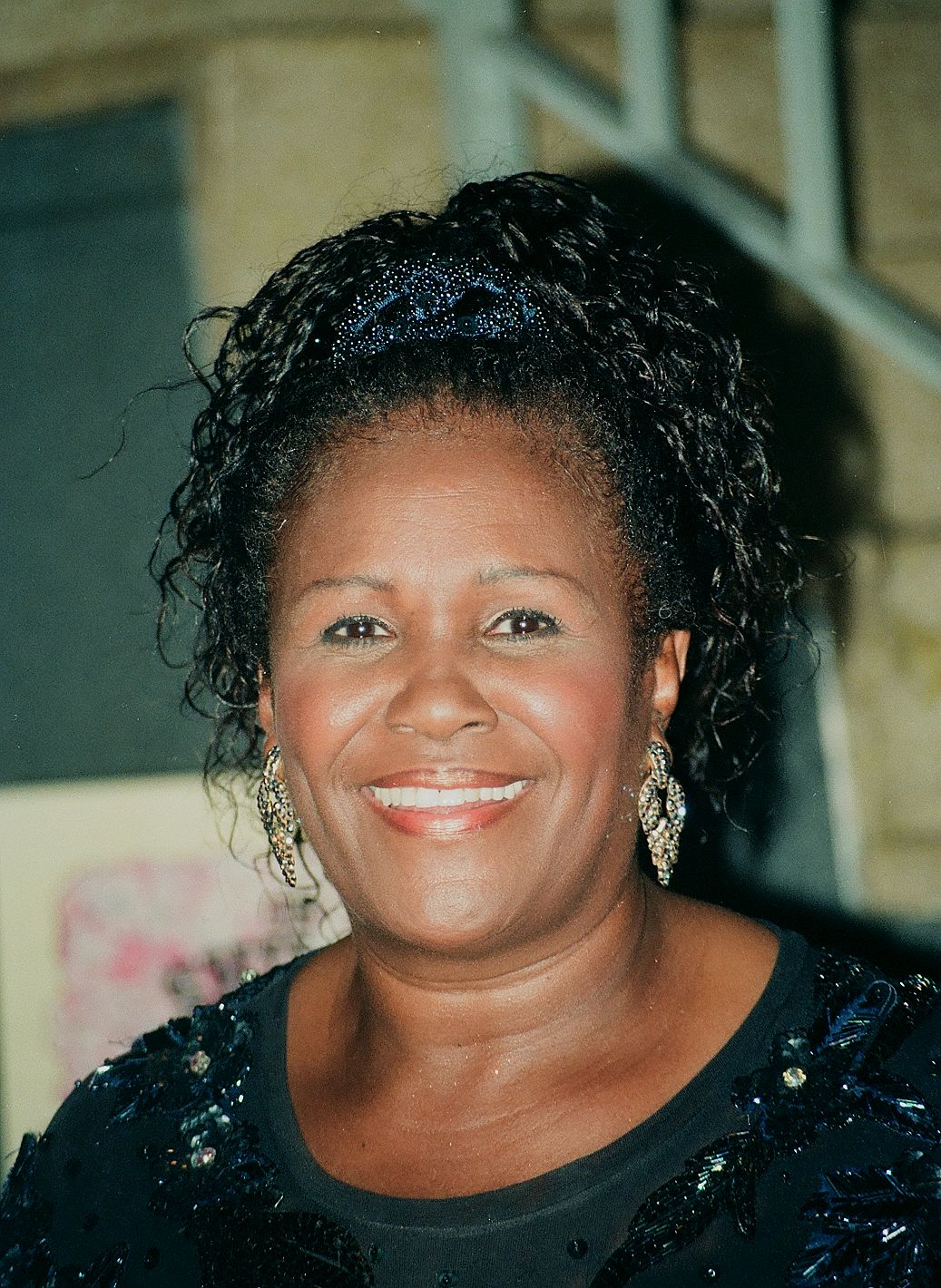

Background information
- Born: Queen Esther; February 12, 1941 (age 85); Newport News, Virginia, U.S.
- Genres: Soul, R&B, gospel, jazz
- Occupation: Singer
- Instrument: Vocals
- Years active: 1965–present
- Labels: Fantasy, Open Door, Edel, Chordant, Intershow, Flying Dutchman
- Website: queenesthermarrow.com

Queen Esther Marrow (born February 12, 1941) is an American soul and gospel singer.

== Biography ==
Queen Esther Marrow was born in Newport News, Virginia. She began her career at the age of 22, when her vocal gifts were discovered by Duke Ellington and made her debut as a featured artist in his "Sacred Concert" world tour. Marrow and Ellington formed a long-life friendship during the next four years while touring together. Queen has since performed with such musicians as Lena Horne, Ella Fitzgerald, B.B. King, Ray Charles, Thelonious Monk, Chick Corea and Bob Dylan.

In 1965, Marrow became active in the civil rights movement when she performed in Dr. Martin Luther King Jr.’s World Crusade. There she met her lifetime idol Mahalia Jackson, with whom she would later share the stage. Other political activists on the crusade were Jesse Jackson, Sidney Poitier and Dr. Ralph Abernathy.

Marrow was also involved in musical theater, jazz, television and film. She played Auntie ‘Em on Broadway in The Wiz, and was featured in several other Broadway shows including Comin’ Uptown, Nice To Be Civilized, and she starred as her idol Mahalia Jackson in the national tour of Sing Mahalia Sing, directed by George Faison. Marrow was featured in Motown’s film The Last Dragon, produced by Berry Gordy. Her many television appearances have ranged from the serious to the comic. They include Duke Ellington: The Music Lives On, as Oscar the Grouch’s mother in Sesame Street on PBS and New York to Paris with The Harlem Gospel Singers, also on PBS. In 1990, a dream of Marrow’s came true when Truly Blessed, a musical about Mahalia Jackson written by and starring Queen Esther, was performed in San Francisco, Washington, D.C., and in New York City on Broadway. The musical received three Helen Hayes nominations including Best New Play.

Marrow has performed for Presidents Ronald Reagan, George H. W. Bush, and Bill Clinton and done a command performance for the British Royal Family. She sang at the Vatican for Pope John Paul II several times.

Most recently she founded The Harlem Gospel Singers, an international touring gospel group. The group with their popularity at an all-time high made history on July 7, 1998, as the only gospel group ever to perform the Grand Evenement du Maurier (grand event) at the Montreal Jazz Festival, drawing over 100,000 audience members.

In 2015, Marrow was the only performer from the original 1965 performance of Duke Ellington’s Sacred Concert to also perform at the 50th anniversary performance at Grace Cathedral, San Francisco.

In 2025, her song “Walk Tall” was featured in an interlude on Beyoncé’s Cowboy Carter Tour.

== Discography ==
- 1971: Newport News, Virginia
- 1972: Sister Woman
- 1994: Queen Esther Marrow & the Harlem Gospel Singers
- 1999: Live in Paris
- 2000: Harlem Gospel Singers with Queen Esther Marrow
- 2002: God Cares
- 2011: Legend

== Awards ==
Year	Award	City
2006	Ella Fitzgerald and Pearl Bailey Lifetime Achievement Award	Newport News, VA

Queen Esther Marrow Helen Hayes Awards Nominations
Year	Award
1989	Outstanding Supporting Performer in a Non-Resident Production
1990	The Charles MacArthur Award for Outstanding New Play
1990	Outstanding Lead Actress in a Resident Musical
