= Fantasy Studios =

Former music recording studio in Berkeley, California

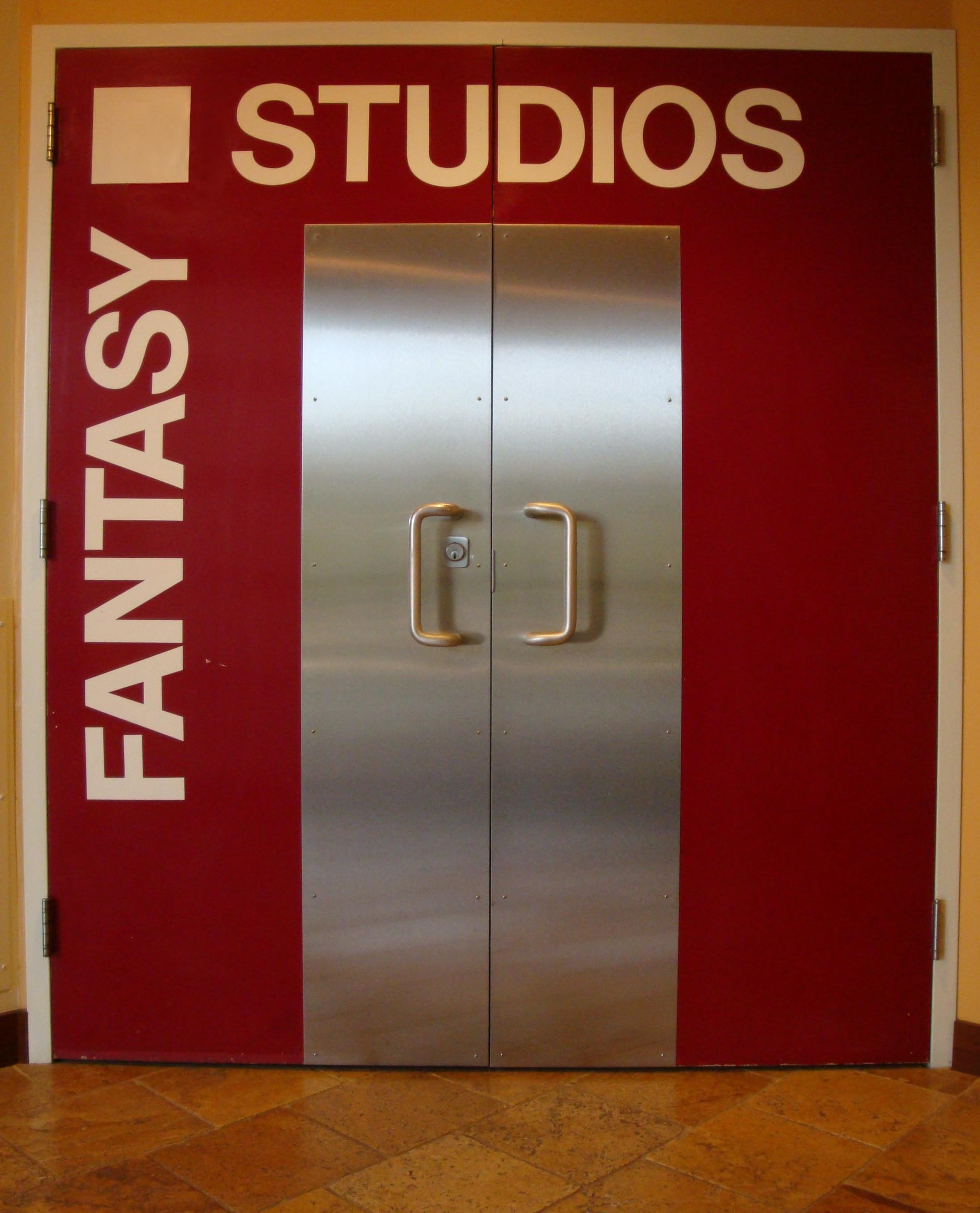
- Type: Recording studio
- Industry: Music
- Founded: 1970; 56 years ago
- Defunct: September 15, 2018; 8 years ago
- Fate: Closed
- Headquarters: Berkeley, California, United States
- Website: fantasystudios.org

Fantasy Studios was a music recording studio in Berkeley, California, United States, at the Zaentz Media Center, known for its recording of award-winning albums including Journey's Escape and Green Day's Dookie. Built as a private recording studio for artists on the Fantasy Records label in 1971, it was opened to the public in 1980 for recording, mixing and mastering. It was permanently closed on September 15, 2018.

== History ==
=== Fantasy Records ===
Fantasy Records and its subsidiary, Galaxy, were established in San Francisco, California, in 1949 by Max and Sol Weiss. The first artist on the label was Dave Brubeck. With help from profits earned from his records the label went on to record Gerry Mulligan, Chet Baker, Cal Tjader and Vince Guaraldi. In addition to musical acts, the label recorded beat poets Lawrence Ferlinghetti and Allen Ginsberg and comic Lenny Bruce.

=== Creedence Clearwater Revival and expansion ===
Saul Zaentz, who joined Fantasy Records as a salesman in 1955, assembled a group of investors in 1967 and purchased the label from the Weiss brothers. In 1968, Fantasy Records signed Creedence Clearwater Revival (CCR), who soon became extremely profitable for the label. Within eighteen months, twenty of CCR's singles made Billboard Hot 100 list and nine were consecutive Top 10 singles in the US. The band also earned 21 RIAA-certified gold or platinum records with total sales of over 100 million worldwide. These successes for CCR made Fantasy the most profitable independent record company in the U.S. and directly resulted in the expansion of Fantasy Records.

In 1971, Fantasy Records relocated to Berkeley, California. In addition to a lobby area, the building included a sauna, an exercise room, and a lunch room, which until 1981 was catered daily by Narsai's Restaurant in Kensington. The sauna and exercise room were later rebuilt for other purposes.

In the early 1970s, under the leadership of label president Ralph Kaffel, Fantasy Records purchased the catalogs of three independent jazz labels:

- Prestige
- Riverside, established in 1953 by Bill Grauer and Orrin Keepnews
- Milestone, which Keepnews started in 1966 after the demise of Riverside

After the acquisitions the company became known as "Fantasy Inc."

=== Recording studios ===
Fantasy Records built Fantasy Studios to accommodate its growing roster, which remained primarily jazz artists but included some in rock, soul and disco. The building went up at 10th and Parker Streets in the western industrial area of Berkeley. Because of the source of funding, it was nicknamed "The House That Creedence Built." Fantasy was the most profitable independent record company in the U.S. Jim Stern, who had served as producer for the Sons of Champlin and Van Morrison, was chief engineer from 1974 until 1981. Jesse Osborn was another early engineer along with Eddie Bill Harris and Don Cody.

=== Studio expansion ===
In 1980, Fantasy Records hired a new Studio Director, Roy Segal. One of Segal's first initiatives was to the addition of Studio D, as well as upgrading the acoustical treatment and equipment in the existing studios. Such upgrades included removing carpet from the studio floors and installing bass traps and tiling for the walls in an effort to acoustically tune the rooms. Equipment upgrades included replacing the original consoles in Studios A and C with Neve 8108s and a Trident in Studio B.

In 1982, Segal was asked to manage the three-year-old Saul Zaentz Film Center, at which point he brought in Nina Bombardier to manage the studios. Bombardier started with Fantasy in 1973 as a receptionist, then moved to manage the Record Plant in Sausalito. She served as the director of Fantasy Studios from 1982 to 2007.

In addition to recording music, Fantasy Studios saw clients in the film, television, gaming and audio book industries for additional dialog recording sessions. All studios were ISDN-compatible, providing full-frequency audio and real-time connectivity to other recording studios around the world.

There were two full-time mastering engineers on site: George Horn and Joe Tarantino. Over his career, Horn remixed or remastered albums by artists such as Charles Mingus, The Grateful Dead, Creedence Clearwater Revival and Santana. Joe Tarantino mastered albums by artists such as Stan Getz, Sonny Rollins, Dave Brubeck, Charlie Parker and Miles Davis.

=== Ownership changes and closure ===
Concord Records acquired Fantasy in late 2004, and the two labels merged to form Concord Music Group. Concord Music Group owned the studios through 2007, at which point the new owners of the Saul Zaentz Media Center, Wareham Property Group, purchased the studios. The role of Studio Director was filled by music producer Jeffrey Wood upon Bombardier's departure. Staff engineers at the time were Adam Muñoz, Jesse Nichols and Alberto Hernandez.

In 2018 Wareham Property Group decided to permanently close the studios. In 2024, it was announced that the property would be used for various media production after the Zoning Adjustments Board voted Thursday to halt owner Wareham Development’s plan to transform the site into a research and development center.

== Facilities ==
Each of Fantasy Studios' three studios were built to serve a specific purpose. There were five working natural echo chambers of varying sizes and tones, accessible from all three control rooms.

=== Studio A ===
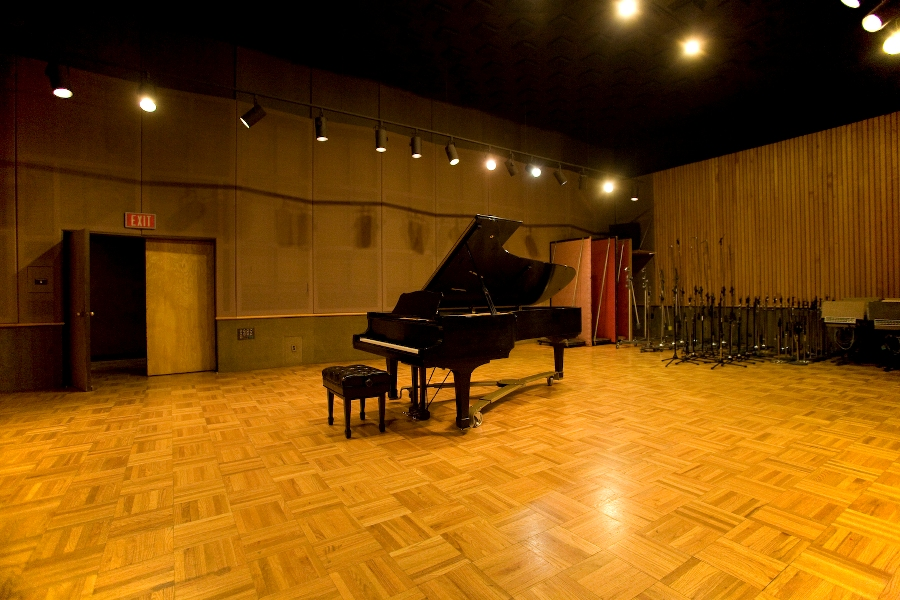
Studio A live room

At 1,344 square feet, Studio A could accommodate a big band, and included a DeMedio console. Small audiences could be brought in to give a recording date the feel of a live album, as Keepnews did for a 1973 Cannonball Adderley session, resulting in the album Inside Straight. Studio A also had a projection booth, pull-down screen and portable mixing console that was built for film mixes. During those early years Fantasy also had a film unit and its films (mostly promotional pieces for the label's artists) were mixed in Studio A. The film unit was headed up by Irving Saraf and Robert N. Zagone, two Bay Area documentary filmmakers. Feature films were mixed in Studio A as well, including Academy Award winners One Flew Over the Cuckoo's Nest, Apocalypse Now, Amadeus and The English Patient.

In 1980, bass traps and wall tiling were installed to improve acoustics. Studio A's mixing console was replaced with a Neve 8108, which was eventually replaced with an SSL Duality SE.

=== Studio B ===
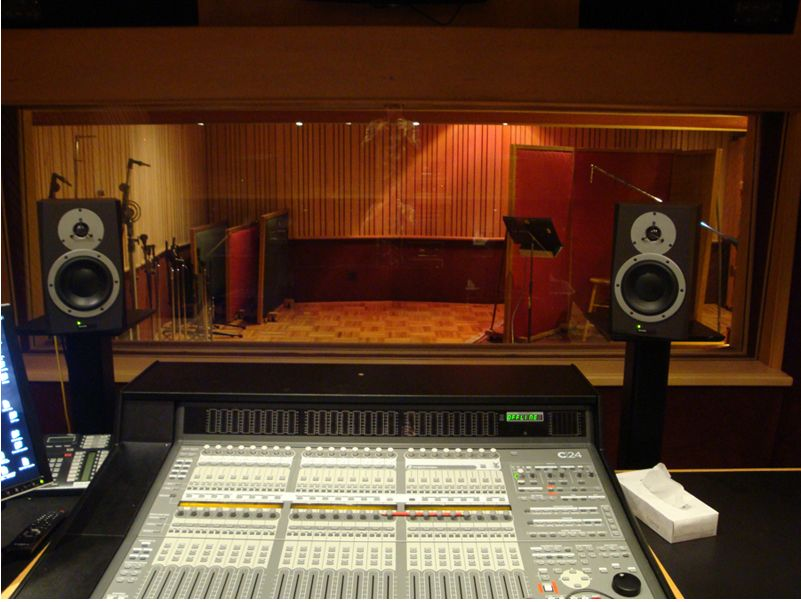
View from control room to live room of Studio B

Studio B, at 546 square feet, was used mostly for smaller acts and comedy records, and was typically used for overdub sessions. Like Studio A, it too used a DeMedio console. In 1980, bass traps and wall tiling were installed to improve acoustics. Studio B's mixing consoles replaced with a Trident, which was eventually updated to a Digidesign C24. Studio B is where Journey's "Faithfully", from their album Frontiers, was recorded.

=== Studio C ===
Studio C was built expressly for CCR, with a separate entrance. Parts of their albums Mardi Gras and Pendulum were recorded there, and the Live in Europe album was mixed there. John Fogerty recorded The Blue Ridge Rangers in Studio C and was in residence there until he left Fantasy in 1974. At 888 square feet, Studio C was also the site of a film soundstage and Foley pits. Studio C was the only studio at Fantasy which used an API console. Studio C was closed to the public in 2008 with the space taken over by another Zaentz Media Center tenant.

=== Studio D ===
Main tracking room of Studio D

From the profits of the 1975 Zaentz-produced film One Flew Over the Cuckoo's Nest, Fantasy Studios expanded further in 1980 with the addition of an adjoining seven-story building which included a fourth recording room, Studio D. It also marked the point at which all rooms became open for use by the public for recording, mastering and film scoring.

The new Studio D was designed by Tom Hidley and constructed by Sierra Audio. The control room featured an automated Neve 8108 board, Hidley monitors, Ampex 16- and 24-track recorders and a Studer 24-track recorder. At 1,500 square feet, the live room was built with multiple interior surfaces (unlike the other three rooms): one side of the room featured bass traps, cork and rock on the walls for a "dead" sound; the other featured hardwood floors and ceiling, and mirrored walls for a more "live" sound. Studio D's mixing console was later updated to an SSL SL 4000 E.

One of first albums to be recorded and mixed in its entirety in the newly opened Studio D was Journey's Escape, which reached #1 on the Billboard 200 Chart. The album contained such hits as "Open Arms" (which reached #2 on the Billboard Hot 100 List), "Who's Crying Now" (reaching #4 on the Billboard Hot 100 List) and "Don't Stop Believin'" (reaching #9 on the Billboard Hot 100 List). Fantasy Studios' staff engineer Wally Buck worked as assistant engineer on the album.

In November 2011, Studio D's original half-wood, half-carpet floors were updated to hardwood cherry flooring.

== Selected major releases by year ==
- Jack Nitzsche – One Flew Over the Cuckoo's Nest (Original Soundtrack), 1975
- Journey – Escape, 1981
- Journey – Frontiers, 1983
- Y&T – In Rock We Trust, 1984
- Europe – The Final Countdown, 1986
- Soda Stereo – Signos, 1986
- Too Short – Life Is... Too Short, 1988
- Bobby McFerrin – Simple Pleasures, 1988
- Chris Isaak – Heart Shaped World, 1989
- Primus – Sailing the Seas of Cheese, 1991
- En Vogue – Funky Divas, 1992
- Green Day – Dookie, 1994
- Blues Traveler – Four, 1994
- Rancid – ...And Out Come the Wolves, 1995
- Jawbreaker – Dear You, 1995
- Santana – Supernatural, 1999
- Santana – Shaman, 2002
- Richard Thompson – Grizzly Man (Original Soundtrack), 2005
- Joanna Newsom – Have One on Me, 2010
- Bill Frisell – All We Are Saying, 2011
- Iggy & the Stooges – Ready to Die, 2013

== Recording artists ==
- Aerosmith
- Azymuth
- Tori Amos
- Joan Baez
- Joshua Bell
- Tony Bennett
- Blues Traveler
- David Bowie
- Chanticleer
- Tracy Chapman
- Chuck D
- Eric Clapton
- Nels Cline
- Chick Corea
- Counting Crows
- Andraé Crouch
- Francesco De Gregori
- Death Angel
- Plácido Domingo
- Doobie Brothers
- Dr. John
- Duran Duran
- Sheila E.
- En Vogue
- Bill Evans
- Forbidden
- Bill Frisell
- Grateful Dead
- Cee-Lo Green
- Green Day
- Buddy Guy
- Sammy Hagar
- MC Hammer
- Herbie Hancock
- Ben Harper
- Isaac Hayes
- Lauryn Hill
- John Lee Hooker
- Huey Lewis and the News
- Iggy & the Stooges
- Indigo Girls
- INXS
- Chris Isaak
- Wyclef Jean
- Journey
- B.B. King
- Lil Wayne
- Los Lonely Boys
- Taj Mahal
- Dave Matthews
- Bobby McFerrin
- Sarah McLachlan
- Charles Mingus
- Mos Def
- Joanna Newsom
- Noemi
- Laura Pausini
- Pavement
- Phish
- Pluto
- The Pretenders
- Primus
- Rancid
- Sonny Rollins
- Santana
- Joe Satriani
- Homayoun Shajarian and Tahmoures Pournazeri
- Soda Stereo
- Tears for Fears
- The Temptations
- Testament
- Richard Thompson
- Too Short
- Train
- McCoy Tyner
- U2
- Voivod
- The White Stripes
- Wilco
- Virginia Wolf
- Stevie Wonder
- Y&T
- Neil Young

== Producers and engineers ==
- Tom Allom, producer
- Jim Anderson, engineer
- Michael "Mike" Anderson, engineer
- Wally Buck, engineer
- T-Bone Burnett, producer
- Ozzie Cadena, producer
- Jason Carmer, engineer
- Don Cody, engineer
- Ben Conrad, engineer
- Richie Corsello, engineer
- T.J. Dougherty, producer
- Joe Ferla, producer
- Steve Fontano, engineer
- Mike Fraser, engineer
- Jim Gaines, engineer
- Eddie Harris, engineer
- Stephen Hart, engineer
- Joe Henry, producer
- Mike Herbick, engineer
- Alberto Hernandez, engineer
- Phil Kaffel, engineer
- Orrin Keepnews, producer
- Glenn Kolotkin, engineer
- Danny Kopelson, engineer
- Dave Luke, engineer
- George Martin, producer
- James McCullagh, engineer
- Adam Muñoz, engineer
- Jesse Nichols, engineer
- Jesse Osborn, engineer
- Alex Perialas, producer
- Bob Porter, producer
- Frank Rinella, engineer
- Michael Rosen, engineer
- Michael Semanick, engineer
- Kevin Shirley, producer
- Jake Sinclair, engineer
- Tom Size, engineer
- Jim Stern, engineer
- Eric Thompson, engineer
- Tone Def, producer
- Lee Townsend, producer
- Butch Walker, producer
- will.i.am, producer
