= Nat Adderley =

American jazz trumpeter and composer (1931–2000)

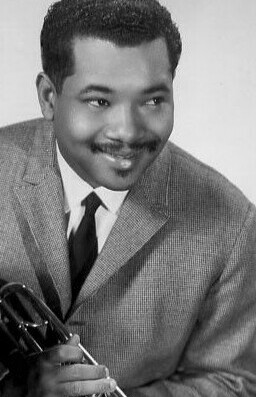
- Adderley in 1966

Background information
- Born: Nathaniel Carlyle Adderley; November 25, 1931; Tampa, Florida, U.S.
- Died: January 2, 2000 (aged 68) Lakeland, Florida, U.S.
- Education: Florida A&M University
- Genres: Jazz
- Occupations: Musician; composer
- Instruments: Trumpet; cornet
- Years active: 1940s–1995
- Labels: Savoy; Wing; EmArcy; Riverside; Jazzland; Atlantic; Milestone
- Relatives: Cannonball Adderley (brother)

Nathaniel Carlyle Adderley (November 25, 1931 – January 2, 2000) was an American jazz trumpeter and composer. He was the younger brother of saxophonist Julian "Cannonball" Adderley, with whom he played for many years.

Adderley's composition "Work Song" (1960) is a jazz standard, and also became a success on the pop charts after singer Oscar Brown Jr. wrote lyrics for it.

== Early life ==
Nat Adderley was born in Tampa, Florida, but moved to Tallahassee when his parents were hired to teach at Florida A&M University. His father played trumpet professionally in his younger years, and he passed down his trumpet to Cannonball. When Cannonball picked up the alto saxophone, he passed the trumpet to Nat, who began playing in 1946. He and Cannonball played with Ray Charles in the early 1940s in Tallahassee and in amateur gigs around the area.

Adderley attended Florida A&M University, majoring in sociology with a minor in music. He switched to cornet in 1950. From 1951 to 1953, he served in the army and played in the army band under his brother, taking at least one tour of Korea before returning to a station in the United States. After returning home, he attended Florida A&M intending to become a teacher.

Shortly before Adderley was expected to begin student teaching, Lionel Hampton played a concert at Florida A&M. Confident in his abilities, he played for Hampton, and Hampton invited him to join the band. Putting school on hold, he played under Hampton from 1954 to 1955 and visited Europe on tour. After returning, he intended to go back to school to become a teacher.

== Career ==
=== 1950s ===
The turning point in the Adderley brothers' careers occurred on a trip to New York in 1955. The brothers stopped by the Café Bohemia in Greenwich Village when bassist Oscar Pettiford was playing. Both of them showed up ready to play. Cannonball was asked to sit in because the regular saxophonist, Jerome Richardson was out, and he overwhelmed the musicians. Then Nat was pulled on stage, and everyone was equally impressed. This appearance was enough to renew their careers. Job offers began pouring in, and Nat recorded for the first time that year.

The brothers moved to New York City, founding the bop group Cannonball Adderley Quintet in 1956. Due to a lack of popular interest, they disbanded the group in 1957. Nat played for trombonist J. J. Johnson for a couple of years and ended up in the Woody Herman sextet. Cannonball gained a higher profile and joined the Miles Davis sextet alongside John Coltrane in time to record the album Kind of Blue.

In 1959, the Cannonball Adderley Quintet reunited. This time around the group was more successful and had its first hit, "This Here", written by pianist Bobby Timmons. The group sound became known as soul jazz, starting the genre. The quintet also played hard bop, as everyone in the group had been influenced by bebop and wanted to continue a virtuosic tradition. Soul jazz kept the group popular, while hard bop gave the musicians a chance to challenge themselves and demonstrate their abilities.

=== 1960s ===
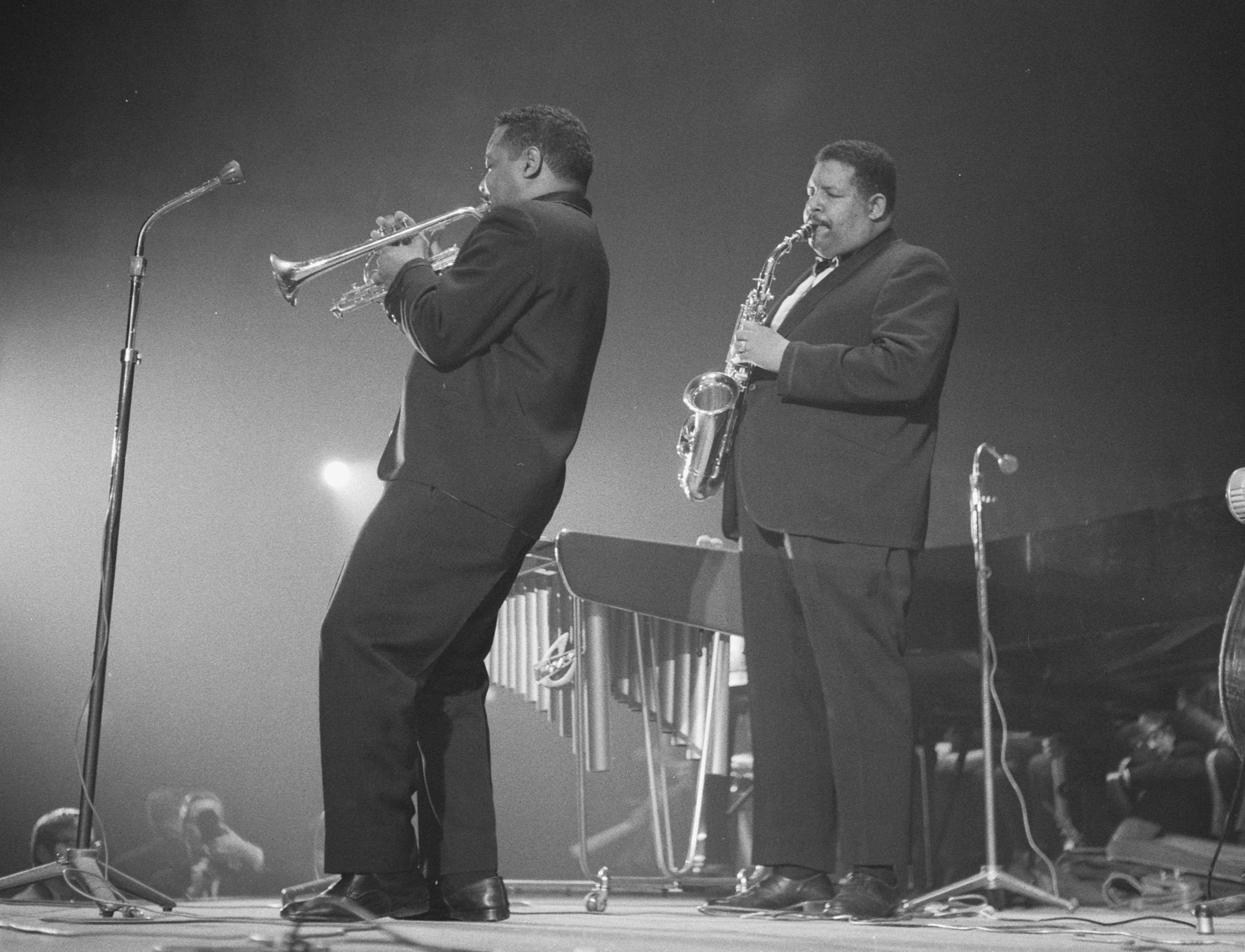
Nat and Cannonball Adderley at the Concertgebouw, Amsterdam, 1961

During the 1960s, Adderley acted as cornetist, composer, and manager for the quintet. While he kept the band in order, he also composed some of the group's most successful songs. His most successful song was "Work Song" (January 1960), a hard bop tune. Adderley called it his "Social Security song" due to the steady flow of income over the years from royalty payments when others recorded the song. "Work Song" is now considered a jazz standard. His other popular songs include "Jive Samba", "Hummin'", "Sermonette", and "The Old Country".

While he was an integral part of the Cannonball Adderley Quintet, this was not the only project occupying his time in his career as a professional jazz musician. Since moving to New York, he had been recording outside the Adderley group. He worked with Kenny Clarke, Wes Montgomery, and Walter Booker.

Other projects included the film A Man Called Adam (1966). In the film, Sammy Davis Jr.'s character plays the trumpet. Since Davis could not himself play the trumpet, Adderley was hired to ghost everything that the character played. His other significant project during this time was a musical. He and his brother wrote Shout Up a Morning based on the folk hero John Henry. While this project started as a collaboration, work was interrupted when Cannonball died from a stroke.

=== 1970s ===
After Cannonball's death in 1975, the quintet broke up. Nat Adderley toured Europe as a headliner. He toured Japan, then returned to the U.S. and taught courses at Harvard while performing and recording with his quintet, which included Walter Booker, Jimmy Cobb, and Vincent Herring. Adderley established himself in his own right. He also worked with Ron Carter, Sonny Fortune, Johnny Griffin, and Antonio Hart.

=== 1980s and later years ===
Adderley created the Adderley Brotherhood, a sextet which included several members of the Cannonball Adderley Quintet. This group toured Europe in 1980. Shout Up a Morning, after having a concert performance in Carnegie Hall shortly after Cannonball's death, was staged in several locations around the United States in 1986. Adderley became involved in several other ensembles over the next decade, including the Paris Reunion Band and a group called the Riverside Reunion Band (after the Riverside label), a bop group that formed at the Monterey Jazz Festival in 1993 and then toured Europe in 1994.

Adderley spent half the year touring and the other half at home in Lakeland, Florida, writing and recording. He thought many of his greatest fans were in Japan, but Europeans were also enthusiastic about the music.

In 1997, he joined the faculty of Florida Southern College as an artist-in-residence. He also helped in the founding and development of the annual Child of the Sun Jazz Festival held annually at the university which he headlined for over a decade. During the same year, he was inducted into the Jazz Hall of Fame in Kansas City.

He lived on 112th Street in Harlem in the 1960s and in Teaneck, New Jersey, in the 1970s, before moving to Lakeland. He also lived near his brother in Corona, Queens.

=== Death and legacy ===
Nat Adderley died as a result of complications from diabetes at the age of 68 in Lakeland, Florida. He was interred near his brother in the Southside Cemetery in Tallahassee, Florida. He was survived by his wife, Ann; a son, Nat Adderley Jr. of West Orange, N.J.; a daughter, Alison Adderley-Pittman of Palm Bay, Florida; and five grandchildren.

He was an innovator in the popularization of soul jazz and was one of the most prolific jazz artists of his time, recording nearly 100 albums. He proved that cornet could be a modern jazz instrument.

== Style ==
Although Adderley started playing trumpet, he switched to the less common cornet. He preferred the darker tone of the conical cornet to the brighter sound of the cylindrical trumpet. He could produce a rich, earthy tone that became his signature sound, one that could only come from the cornet. He also enjoyed the cornet's historic quality, reinvigorating the instrument played by early jazz musicians.

Adderley is widely attributed with the development and establishment of the 1960s style of soul jazz along with the rest of the members Cannonball Adderley Quintet. This style is characterized by simple harmonies, a heavy blues feel, catchy riffs, and a presence of the church. The point of soul jazz was to bring back a simpler type of jazz that had direct influence from blues and church music.

The Other Side sample
An audio sample of "The Other Side" from the 1966 album Sayin' Somethin'

However, this is not the only style that Adderley wrote and played. The quintet was also widely known for their hard bop, which comprised roughly half of their recorded work.

As a soloist and composer, Adderley had a wide range of abilities. He could improvise simpler, more soulful solos for soul jazz numbers, but he could experiment and show off all of his abilities for hard bop. Especially in playing hard bop, he was not afraid to use the range of the instrument, often playing below the typical cornet range for short bursts before returning to the normal range. Although his range was starting to fade by the late 1960s, this did not keep him from continuing to play for the rest of his life.

== Discography ==
=== As leader ===
Recording date	Title	Label	Year released	Notes
1955-06-26	That's Nat	Savoy	1955	
1955-09-06	Introducing Nat Adderley	Wing	1955	
1956-07-12, -18, -23	To the Ivy League from Nat	EmArcy	1956	
1958-09	Branching Out	Riverside	1956	
1959-03-23, -27	Much Brass	Riverside	1959	
1960-01-25, -27	Work Song	Riverside	1960	
1960-08-09; 1960-09-15	That's Right!	Riverside	1960	
1961-06-20; 1961-07-19	Naturally!	Jazzland	1961	
1962-05-19	In the Bag	Jazzland	1962	
1963-09-23; 1963-10-04	Little Big Horn	Riverside	1963	
1964-12-21 – 1965-01-07	Autobiography	Atlantic	1965	
1966-02-16	Sayin' Somethin'	Atlantic	1966	
1966-10-31	Live at Memory Lane	Atlantic	1967	Live
1968-01-18, -19	The Scavenger	Milestone	1968	
1968-03-26, -28; 1968-04-04	You, Baby	CTI	1968	
1968-11-19, -21; 1968-12-04	Calling Out Loud	CTI	1969	
1972	Soul Zodiac	Capitol	1972	
1972	Soul of the Bible	Capitol	1972	[2LP]
1974	Double Exposure	Prestige	1975	[2LP]
1976-08-09	Don't Look Back	SteepleChase	1976	
1976	Hummin'	Little David	1976	
1978-09-18, -19	A Little New York Midtown Music	Galaxy	1979	
1982-10	On the Move	Theresa	1983	Live
1982-10	Blue Autumn	Theresa	1983	Live
1989-11-18	We Remember Cannon	In & Out	1991	
1990-05-12, -13	Autumn Leaves: Live at Sweet Basil	Bellaphon	1991	Live
1990-05-12, -13	Work Song: Live at Sweet Basil	Bellaphon	1991	Live
1990-11-08, -09	Talkin' About You	Landmark	1991	
1990-12-05, -06	The Old Country	Alfa Jazz	1991	
1992–01–19, –20	A Night In Manhattan	Alfa Jazz	1992	
1992-03-26	Workin'	Timeless	1993	
1994-06-20, -21	Good Company	Challenge	1994	
1994-10-25, -27	Live at the 1994 Floating Jazz Festival	Chiaroscuro	1996	[2CD] Live
1995-12-18, -19	Mercy, Mercy, Mercy	Alfa Jazz	2007	

Compilation:

- Live on Planet Earth (West Wind, 2008) – live

=== As sideman ===
With Cannonball Adderley

- Presenting Cannonball Adderley (Savoy, 1955)
- Julian "Cannonball" Adderley (Emarcy, 1955)
- In the Land of Hi-Fi with Julian Cannonball Adderley (Emarcy, 1956)
- Sophisticated Swing (Emarcy, 1957)
- Cannonball Enroute (Mercury, 1957)
- Cannonball's Sharpshooters (Mercury, 1958)
- The Cannonball Adderley Quintet in San Francisco (Riverside, 1959)
- Them Dirty Blues (Riverside, 1960)
- The Cannonball Adderley Quintet at the Lighthouse (Riverside, 1960)
- African Waltz (Riverside, 1961) – recorded in 1957
- The Cannonball Adderley Quintet Plus (Riverside, 1961)
- Nancy Wilson/Cannonball Adderley (Capitol, 1962) – recorded in 1961
- The Cannonball Adderley Sextet in New York (Riverside, 1962)
- Cannonball in Europe! (Riverside, 1962)
- Jazz Workshop Revisited (Riverside, 1962)
- Autumn Leaves (Riverside, 1963)
- Nippon Soul (Riverside, 1963)
- The Sextet (Milestone, 1982) – recorded in 1962–63
- Cannonball Adderley Live! (Capitol, 1964)
- Live Session! (Capitol, 1964)
- Cannonball Adderley's Fiddler on the Roof (Capitol, 1964)
- Domination (Capitol, 1965)
- Great Love Themes (Capitol, 1966)
- Mercy, Mercy, Mercy! Live at "The Club" (Capitol, 1966)
- Cannonball in Japan (Capitol, 1966)
- 74 Miles Away (Capitol, 1967)
- Why Am I Treated So Bad! (Capitol, 1967)
- In Person (Capitol, 1968)
- Accent on Africa (Capitol, 1968)
- Radio Nights (Night/Virgin, 1968)
- Country Preacher (Capitol, 1969)
- The Cannonball Adderley Quintet & Orchestra (Capitol, 1970)
- The Price You Got to Pay to Be Free (Capitol, 1970)
- The Happy People (Capitol, 1972) – recorded in 1970
- The Black Messiah (Capitol, 1971)
- Music You All (Capitol, 1976) – recorded in 1972
- Inside Straight (Fantasy, 1973) – live
- Love, Sex, and the Zodiac (Fantasy, 1974) – recorded in 1970
- Pyramid (Fantasy, 1974)
- Phenix (Fantasy, 1975)
- Big Man: The Legend of John Henry (Fantasy, 1975)[2LP]
- Lovers (Fantasy, 1976) – recorded in 1975
- Money in the Pocket (Capitol, 2005) – recorded in 1966

With Gene Ammons

- Gene Ammons and Friends at Montreux (Prestige, 1973) – live
- Goodbye (Prestige, 1974)

With Jimmy Heath

- The Thumper (Riverside, 1960) – recorded in 1959
- Really Big! (Riverside, 1960)

With J. J. Johnson

- J. J. in Person! (Columbia, 1958)
- Really Livin' (Columbia, 1959)
- The Yokohama Concert (Pablo Live, 1978) – live recorded in 1977
- Chain Reaction: Yokohama Concert, Vol. 2 (Pablo, 2002) – recorded in 1977

With Philly Joe Jones

- Blues for Dracula (Riverside, 1958)
- Philly Mignon (Galaxy, 1978) – recorded in 1977

With Sam Jones

- The Soul Society (Riverside, 1960)
- The Chant (Riverside, 1961)

With King Curtis

- The New Scene of King Curtis (New Jazz, 1960) - as Little Brother
- Soul Meeting (Prestige, 1960)

With Oliver Nelson

- Encyclopedia of Jazz (Verve, 1967) – recorded in 1965-66
- The Sound of Feeling (Verve, 1968) – recorded in 1966-67

With others

- Kenny Burrell, Ellington Is Forever Volume Two (Fantasy, 1977) – recorded in 1975
- Charlie Byrd, Top Hat (Fantasy, 1975)
- James Clay, A Double Dose of Soul (Riverside, 1960)
- Victor Feldman, Soviet Jazz Themes (Äva, 1963) – recorded in 1962
- Red Garland, Red Alert (Galaxy, 1978) – recorded in 1977
- Benny Golson, That's Funky (Meldac Jazz, 1995) – recorded in 1994
- Bennie Green and Gene Ammons, The Swingin'est (Vee-Jay, 1958)
- Johnny Griffin, White Gardenia (Riverside, 1961)
- Louis Hayes, Louis Hayes (Vee-Jay, 1960)
- Milt Jackson, Big Bags (Riverside, 1962)
- Budd Johnson, Budd Johnson and the Four Brass Giants (Riverside, 1960)
- Quincy Jones, I/We Had a Ball (Limelight, 1965) – recorded in 1964-65
- Wynton Kelly, Kelly Blue (Riverside, 1959)
- Sal Nistico, Heavyweights (Jazzland, 1962) – recorded in 1961
- Sonny Rollins, Sonny Rollins and the Big Brass (MetroJazz, 1958)
- A. K. Salim, Blues Suite (Savoy, 1958)
- Eddie "Cleanhead" Vinson, Back Door Blues (Riverside, 1962) – recorded in 1961-62
- Don Wilkerson, The Texas Twister (Riverside, 1960)
- Joe Williams, Joe Williams Live (Fantasy, 1973) – live
