= Cannonball Adderley =

American jazz saxophonist (1928–1975)

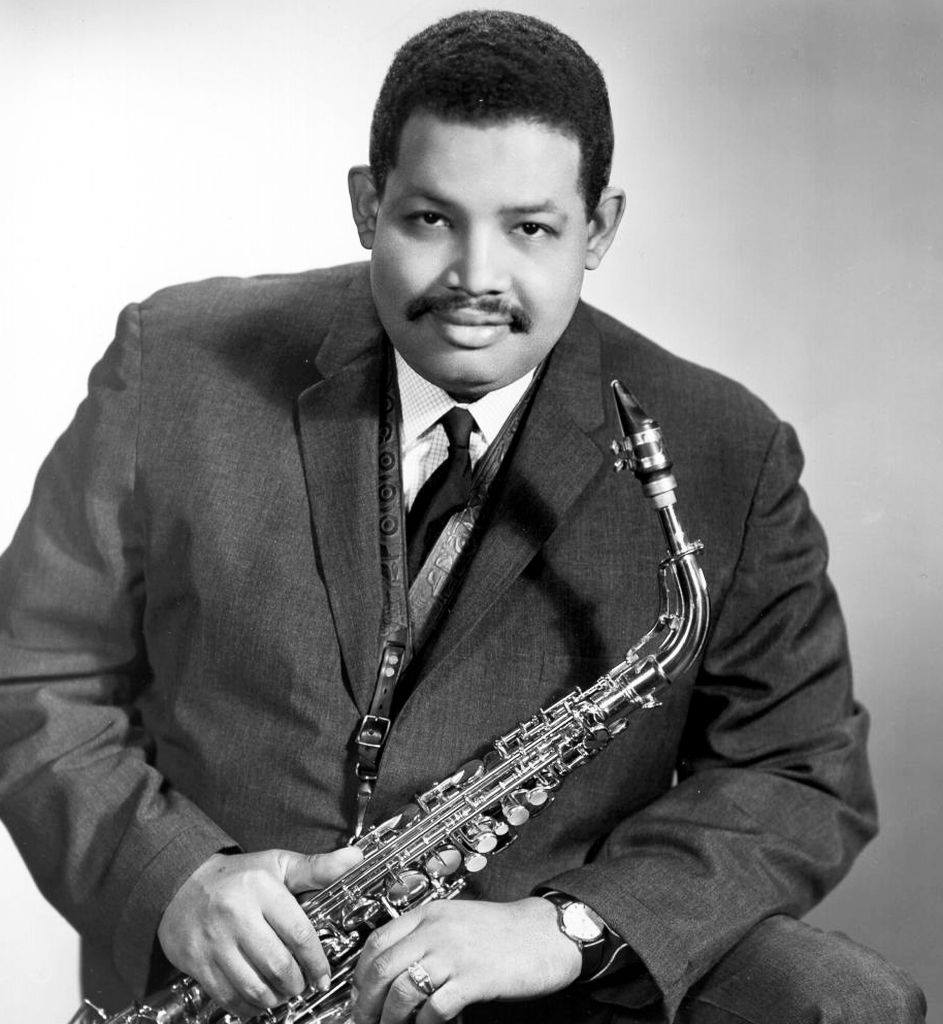
- Adderley c. 1966

Background information
- Born: Julian Edwin Adderley; September 15, 1928; Tampa, Florida, U.S.
- Died: August 8, 1975 (aged 46) Gary, Indiana, U.S.
- Genres: Jazz; hard bop; modal jazz; soul jazz; jazz fusion
- Occupations: Musician; composer
- Instrument: Alto saxophone
- Works: Cannonball Adderley discography
- Years active: 1955–1975
- Labels: Blue Note; Fantasy; Capitol; Prestige; Riverside
- Education: Florida A&M University
- Relatives: Nat Adderley (brother)

Julian Edwin "Cannonball" Adderley (September 15, 1928 – August 8, 1975) was an American jazz alto saxophonist of the hard bop era of the 1950s and 1960s.

Adderley is perhaps best remembered by the general public for the 1966 soul jazz single "Mercy, Mercy, Mercy", which was written for him by his keyboardist Joe Zawinul and became a major crossover hit on the pop and R&B charts. A cover version by the Buckinghams, who added lyrics, also reached No. 5 on the charts. Adderley worked with Miles Davis, first as a member of the Davis sextet, appearing on the seminal records Milestones (1958) and Kind of Blue (1959), and then on his own 1958 album Somethin' Else. He was the elder brother of jazz trumpeter Nat Adderley, who was a longtime member of his band.

== Early life and career ==
Julian Edwin Adderley was born on September 15, 1928, in Tampa, Florida, United States, to high school guidance counselor and cornet player Julian Carlyle Adderley and elementary school teacher Jessie Johnson. Elementary school classmates called him "cannonball" (i.e., "cannibal") for his voracious appetite.

Cannonball moved to Tallahassee when his parents obtained teaching positions at Florida A&M University. Both Cannonball and brother Nat played with Ray Charles when Charles lived in Tallahassee during the early 1940s. Adderley moved to Broward County, Florida, in 1948 and studied music at Florida A&M University, pledging the Beta Nu chapter of Alpha Phi Alpha fraternity. He then became the band director at Dillard High School in Fort Lauderdale, a position which he held until 1950.

Adderley was drafted into the U.S. Army in 1950 during the Korean War, serving as leader of the 36th Army Dance Band. He left Southeast Florida and moved to New York City in 1955, seeking graduate studies at local conservatories. One of his known addresses in New York was in the neighborhood of Corona, Queens. One night, in 1955, he brought his saxophone with him to the Café Bohemia and was asked to sit in with Oscar Pettiford in place of his band's regular saxophonist, Jerome Richardson, who was late for the gig. The "buzz" on the New York jazz scene after Adderley's performance announced him as the heir to the mantle of Charlie Parker.

Adderley formed his own group with his brother Nat after signing with the Savoy jazz label in 1955. He was noticed by Miles Davis and, because of his blues-rooted alto saxophone, was asked to play with his group. He joined the Davis Quintet in October 1957, three months prior to the return of John Coltrane to the group. Davis notably appears on Adderley's solo album Somethin' Else (also featuring Art Blakey and Hank Jones), which was recorded shortly after the two met. Adderley then played on the seminal Davis records Milestones and Kind of Blue. This period also overlapped with pianist Bill Evans's time with the sextet, an association that led to Evans appearing on Portrait of Cannonball and Know What I Mean?.

His interest as an educator carried over to his recordings. In 1961, Cannonball narrated The Child's Introduction to Jazz, released on Riverside Records. In 1962, Cannonball married actress Olga James.

== Bandleader ==
The Cannonball Adderley Quintet featured Cannonball on alto saxophone and his brother, Nat, on cornet. Cannonball's first quintet was not very successful; however, after leaving Davis's group, he formed another group again with his brother. The new quintet, which later became the Cannonball Adderley Sextet, and Cannonball's other combos and groups, included such noted musicians as saxophonists Charles Lloyd and Yusef Lateef, pianists Bobby Timmons, Barry Harris, Victor Feldman, Joe Zawinul, Sérgio Mendes, Hal Galper, Michael Wolff, and George Duke, bassists Ray Brown, Sam Jones, Walter Booker, and Victor Gaskin, and drummers Louis Hayes and Roy McCurdy.

This group was considerably more successful; in addition to his inventive and melodic music, Adderley became known for his wryly humorous comments in between songs. In Adderley's obituary in The New York Times, he was quoted as saying, "I like a close rapport with my audience … They like it, too. It gives them a closer association with what you have to say musically. That's healthy. Some guys hide behind their horns. I do everything but hide behind mine."

== Later life ==
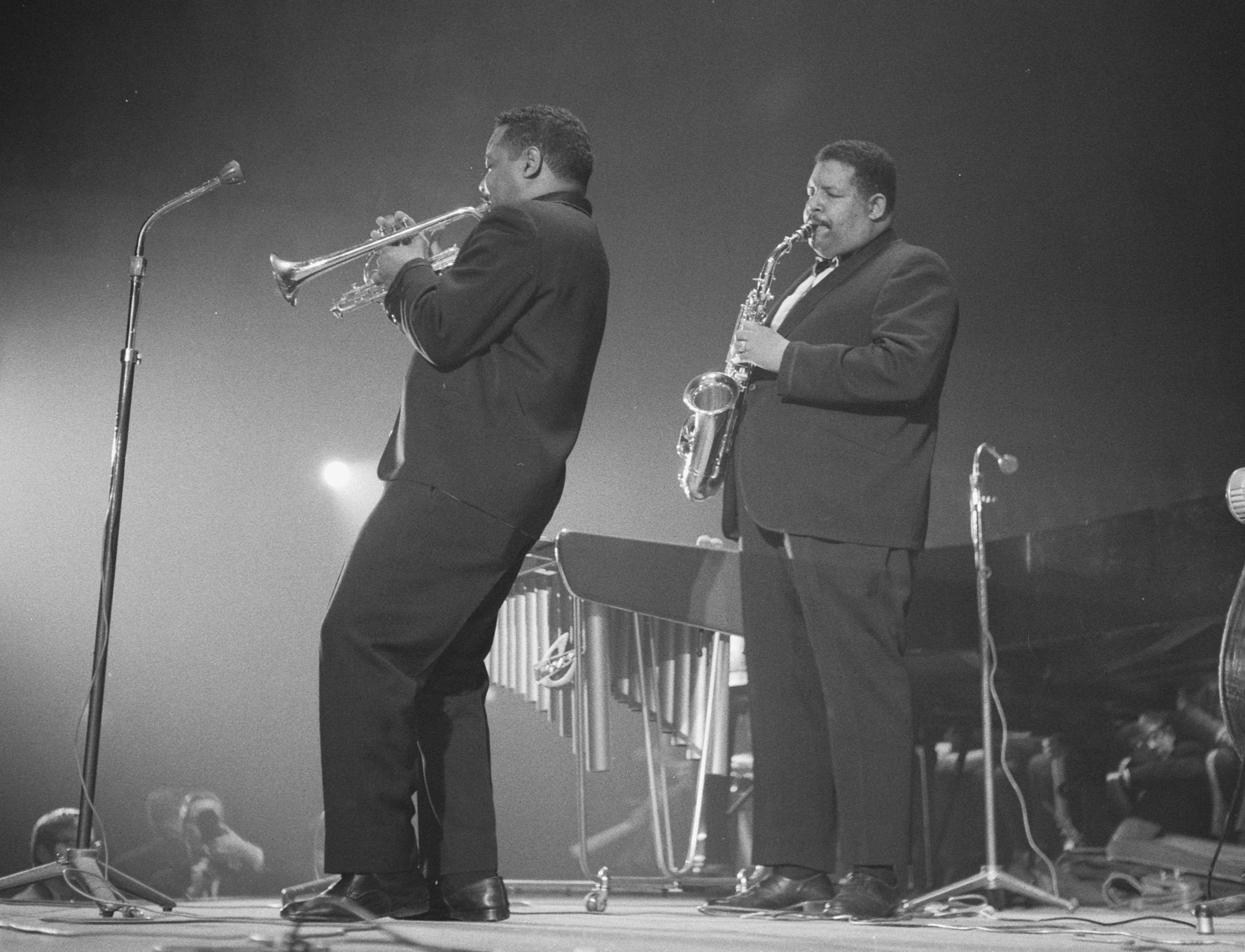
Nat (left) and Cannonball Adderley at the Concertgebouw, Amsterdam, in 1961

By the end of the 1960s, Adderley's playing began to reflect the influence of electric jazz. In this period, he released albums such as Accent on Africa (1968) and The Price You Got to Pay to Be Free (1970). In 1970, his quintet appeared at the Monterey Jazz Festival in California, and a brief scene of that performance was featured in the 1971 psychological thriller Play Misty for Me, starring Clint Eastwood. In 1975, he also appeared in an acting role alongside José Feliciano and David Carradine in the episode "Battle Hymn" in the third season of the TV series Kung Fu.

Songs made famous by Adderley and his bands include "This Here" (written by Bobby Timmons), "The Jive Samba", "Work Song" (written by Nat Adderley), "Mercy, Mercy, Mercy" (written by Joe Zawinul), and "Walk Tall" (written by Zawinul, Esther Marrow, and James Rein). A cover version of Pops Staples's "Why (Am I Treated So Bad)?" also entered the chart. His instrumental "Sack o' Woe" was covered by Manfred Mann on their debut album, The Five Faces of Manfred Mann.

== Death and legacy ==
In July 1975, Adderley suffered a stroke from a cerebral hemorrhage and died four weeks later, on August 8, 1975, at St. Mary Methodist Hospital in Gary, Indiana. He was 46 years old. He was survived by his wife, Olga James Adderley, parents Julian Carlyle and Jessie Lee Adderley, and brother Nat Adderley. He was buried in the Southside Cemetery, Tallahassee, Florida.

Later in 1975, he was inducted into the DownBeat Jazz Hall of Fame. Joe Zawinul's composition "Cannon Ball" on Weather Report's album Black Market is a tribute to his former leader. Pepper Adams and George Mraz dedicated the composition "Julian", on Adams's 1975 album of the same name, days after Cannonball's death.

Adderley was initiated as an honorary member of the Phi Mu Alpha Sinfonia fraternity (Gamma Theta chapter, University of North Texas, 1960, and Xi Omega chapter, Frostburg State University, 1970) and Alpha Phi Alpha (Beta Nu chapter, Florida A&M University).
