= Carol Kaye discography =

Carol Kaye (née Smith; born March 24, 1935) is an American musician. She is one of the most prolific recorded bass guitarists in rock and pop music, playing on an estimated 10,000 recordings in a career spanning over 65 years.

== Albums & songs ==
This is a partial list of albums and songs that bassist Carol Kaye played on.

- A Man and a Woman – Laurindo Almeida (1967)
- A Natural Man – Lou Rawls (1971)
- A Time for Us – Mel Tormé (1969)
- A Message from the People – Ray Charles (1972)
- Accent on Africa – Cannonball Adderley (1968)
- Across 110th Street – Bobby Womack (1972)
- Anyone Who Knows What Love Is (Will Understand) – Irma Thomas (1964)
- Bang Bang (My Baby Shot Me Down) – Cher (1966)
- Batman Theme – The Marketts (1966)
- Beach Boys Today – The Beach Boys (1965)
- When I Die - Motherlode (1969)
- Big Man – Cannonball Adderley (1975)
- Brasswind – Gene Ammons (1974)
- California Girls – The Beach Boys (1965)
- Cameo – Dusty Springfield (1973)
- Can't Take My Eyes Off You – Andy Williams (1968)
- Cass Elliot – Cass Elliot (1972)
- Charles Kynard – Charles Kynard (1971)
- Chér – Cher (1966)
- Cream of the Crop – The Supremes (1969)(side 2: track 4)
- Danke Schoen – Wayne Newton (1963)
- David Axelrod – David Axelrod (2001)
- Diana Ross & the Supremes Join the Temptations – The Supremes and The Temptations (1968)(side 1: tracks 1, 5, 6; side 2: tracks 1, 5)
- Do I Love You (Indeed I Do) – Frank Wilson (1965)
- Donna – Ritchie Valens (1958) Kaye played guitar on this recording.
- Expecting to Fly – Buffalo Springfield (1967)
- Fast Man Raider Man – Frank Black (2006)
- Feelin' Alright? – Joe Cocker (1969)
- Forever Changes – Love (1967)
- Four in Blue – The Miracles (1969)(side 1: track 4)
- Freak Out! – The Mothers of Invention (1966)
- Gypsys, Tramps & Thieves – Cher (1971)
- Hard Times – Roy Brown (1973)
- Hold Me, Thrill Me, Kiss Me – Mel Carter (1965)
- Almost In Your Arms – Sam Cooke (1958)
- Hully Gully – The Olympics (1959)
- I Am a Rock – Simon & Garfunkel (1966)
- I Don't Need No Doctor – Ray Charles (1966)
- I Hear a Symphony – The Supremes (1966)(side 1: tracks 1,4,5)
- I Heard That!! – Quincy Jones (1976)
- I Knew Jesus (Before He Was a Star) – Glen Campbell (1973)
- I'm Ready for Love – Martha and the Vandellas (1966)
- In and Out of Love – The Supremes (1967)
- In Case You're in Love – Sonny & Cher (1967)
- In the Heat of the Night – Ray Charles (1967)
- Indian Reservation (The Lament of the Cherokee Reservation Indian) – Paul Revere & the Raiders (1971)
- It Must Be Him – Vikki Carr (1967)
- Johnny Angel – Shelley Fabares (1962)
- La Bamba – Ritchie Valens (1958) Kaye played acoustic guitar on this recording.
- Lipstick Traces (on a Cigarette) – The O'Jays (1965)
- Little Green Apples – O. C. Smith (1968)
- Livin' It Up! – Jimmy Smith (1968)
- Love Country Style – Ray Charles (1970)
- Love is Here and Now You're Gone – The Supremes (1967)
- Love Theme from Romeo and Juliet – Henry Mancini (1968)
- Speak Softly Love – Andy Williams (1972)
- Mannix – Lalo Schifrin (1969)
- Mercy, Mercy, Mercy – The Buckinghams (1967)
- Merry Christmas – The Supremes (1965)(side 1: tracks 2,3,4,6; side 2: tracks 1–6)
- Midnight Confessions – The Grass Roots (1968)
- Spanish Eyes – Al Martino (1965)
- More Mission: Impossible – Lalo Schifrin (1968)
- More of the Monkees – The Monkees (1967)
- Music from Mission: Impossible – Lalo Schifrin (1967)
- Neil Young – Neil Young (1968)
- No Matter What Shape (Your Stomach's In) – The T-Bones (1965)
- Northern Windows – Hampton Hawes (1974)
- Parsley, Sage, Rosemary and Thyme – Simon and Garfunkel (1966)(side 1: tracks 1,4)
- Pet Sounds – The Beach Boys (1966)
- Pink Shoe Laces – Dodie Stevens (1959)
- Presenting the Fabulous Ronettes – The Ronettes (1964)
- Pride – David Axelrod (1970)
- Quincy's Got a Brand New Bag – Quincy Jones (1965)
- Raindrops Keep Fallin' on My Head – B. J. Thomas (1969)
- Ray Charles Invites You to Listen – Ray Charles (1967)
- Ray's Moods – Ray Charles (1966)
- Reelin' with the Feelin' – Charles Kynard (1969)
- Release of an Oath – The Electric Prunes (1968)
- Rhythm of the Rain – The Cascades (1962)
- River Deep, Mountain High – Ike & Tina Turner (1967)
- Rock Messiah – David Axelrod (1971)
- Shades – J. J. Cale (1981)
- Sloop John B – The Beach Boys (1966)
- Smackwater Jack – Quincy Jones (1971)
- Smile – The Beach Boys
- The Smile Sessions – The Beach Boys (2011)
- "Smooth Operator" – Sarah Vaughan (1959)
- Some People Can Do What They Like – Robert Palmer (1976)
- Somethin' Stupid – Frank Sinatra and Nancy Sinatra (1967)
- Song of Innocence – David Axelrod (1968)
- Songs of Experience – David Axelrod (1969)
- Soul Spin – Four Tops (1969) (side 1: track 4; side 2: tracks 1,4)
- Sugar Town – Nancy Sinatra (1966)
- Summer Days (and Summer Nights!!) – The Beach Boys (1965)
- Summertime – Sam Cooke (1957)
- Surf's Up – The Beach Boys (1971)
- Tainted Love – Gloria Jones (1965)
- The Beat Goes On – Sonny & Cher (1967)
- The Complete Duets – Marvin Gaye and Tammi Terrell (2001) (disc one : track 27)
- The Honeysuckle Breeze – Tom Scott (1967)
- The Man From Shaft – Richard Roundtree (1972)
- The Original Jam Sessions 1969 – Quincy Jones (1969)
- The Sound of Nancy Wilson – Nancy Wilson (1968)
- The Supremes A' Go-Go – The Supremes (1966)(side 1: tracks 2, 4; side 2: tracks 2, 4)
- The Supremes Sing Rodgers & Hart – The Supremes (1967)(side 1: tracks 1,2,4,5,6; side 2: tracks 1,3)
- The Temptations in a Mellow Mood – The Temptations (1966)
- The Temptations Wish It Would Rain – The Temptations (1968)(side 2: track 1)
- The Way We Were – Barbra Streisand (1973)
- The World We Knew – Frank Sinatra (1967)
- The Zodiac: Cosmic Sounds (1967)
- Then He Kissed Me – The Crystals (1964)
- There's a Whole Lalo Schifrin Goin' On – Lalo Schifrin (1968)
- These Boots Are Made for Walkin' – Nancy Sinatra (1965)
- Time Is On My Side – Irma Thomas (1964)
- Time Out for Smokey Robinson & The Miracles – The Miracles (1969)(side 1: track 3)
- Try a Little Kindness – Glen Campbell (1970)
- Unchained Melody – The Righteous Brothers (1965)
- United – Marvin Gaye and Tammi Terrell (1967) (track 12)
- Volcanic Action of My Soul – Ray Charles (1971)
- When I Die – Motherlode (1969)
- (Where Do I Begin?) Love Story – Andy Williams (1971)
- Whipped Cream & Other Delights – Herb Alpert (1965)
- Wichita Lineman – Glen Campbell (1968)
- The Wilsons – The Wilsons (1996)
- Wind, Sky and Diamonds – Gábor Szabó (1968)
- Wish Someone Would Care – Irma Thomas (1964)
- You're Nobody till Somebody Loves You – Dean Martin (1964)
- You've Got It Bad Girl – Quincy Jones (1973)
- You've Lost That Lovin' Feelin' – The Righteous Brothers (1967)
- You've Made Me So Very Happy – Brenda Holloway (1967)
- Zip-a-Dee-Doo-Dah – Bob B. Soxx & the Blue Jeans (1962)

== Soundtracks ==
This is a partial list of soundtracks that bassist Carol Kaye played on.

With Alfred Newman

- Airport (1970)

With Billy Goldenberg

- Change of Habit (1969)
- Duel (1971)

With Burt Bacharach

- Butch Cassidy and the Sundance Kid (1969)

With Cy Coleman

- Sweet Charity (1969)

With Dave Grusin

- Waterhole No. 3 (1967)
- Candy (1968)
- Winning (1969)
- Adam at 6 A.M. (1971)

With Dee Barton

- High Plains Drifter (1973)

With Dominic Frontiere

- On Any Sunday (1971)

With Elmer Bernstein

- Baby the Rain Must Fall (1965)
- Big Jake (1971)

With Frank De Vol

- Guess Who's Coming to Dinner (1967)

With Henry Mancini

- Me, Natalie (1969)
- Sometimes a Great Notion (1971)
- The Thief Who Came to Dinner (1973)

With Jerry Goldsmith

- Bandolero! (1968)
- Escape from the Planet of the Apes (1971)

With J. J. Johnson

- Across 110th Street (1972)

With John Williams

- Daddy's Gone A-Hunting (1969)
- The Poseidon Adventure (1972)
- The Long Goodbye (1973)
- The Paper Chase (1973)
- The Sugarland Express (1974)
- The Eiger Sanction (1975)

With Johnny Mandel

- Harper (1966)
- M*A*S*H (1970)

With Lalo Schifrin

- Murderer's Row (1966)
- The Fox (1967)
- Where Angels Go, Trouble Follows (1968)
- Coogan's Bluff (1968)
- Bullitt (1968)
- Dirty Harry (1971)
- Magnum Force (1973)

With Leonard Rosenman

- Beneath the Planet of the Apes (1970)

With Michel Legrand

- The Thomas Crown Affair (1968)
- The Happy Ending (1969)
- Le Mans (1971)
- One Is a Lonely Number (1972)

With Nelson Riddle

- Red Line 7000 (1965)
- El Dorado (1966)

With Peter Schickele

- Silent Running (1972)

With Quincy Jones

- The Pawnbroker (1964)
- The Slender Thread (1965)
- Walk, Don't Run (1966)
- Banning (1967)
- In the Heat of the Night (1967)
- In Cold Blood (1967)
- A Dandy In Aspic (1968)
- The Split (1968)
- Mackenna's Gold (1969)
- The Lost Man (1969)
- Bob & Carol & Ted & Alice (1969)
- The Italian Job (1969)
- Cactus Flower (1969)
- They Call Me Mister Tibbs! (1970)
- Killer By Night (1972)
- The Hot Rock (1972)
- The New Centurions (1972)

With Vic Mizzy

- Don't Make Waves (1967)
- The Shakiest Gun in the West (1968)

== TV shows ==
This is a partial list of TV shows that bassist Carol Kaye played on.

With Billy Goldenberg

- Kojak (1973)

With Charles Fox

- Wonder Woman (1976)
- The Love Boat (1977)

With David Shire

- McCloud (1970)
- Alice (1976)

With Frank De Vol

- The Brady Bunch (1969)

With Irving Szathmary

- Get Smart (1965)

With Jerry Fielding

- Hogan's Heroes (1965)

With Jerry Goldsmith

- Room 222 (1969)

With John Williams

- Lost in Space (1965)

With Lalo Schifrin

- Mission: Impossible (1966)
- Mannix (1967)

With Morton Stevens

- Hawaii Five-O Theme (1968)

With Patrick Williams

- The Streets of San Francisco (1972)

With Quincy Jones

- Ironside (1967)
- The Bill Cosby Show (1969)

With Richard Markowitz

- The Wild Wild West (1965)

With Vic Mizzy

- The Addams Family (1964)
- Green Acres (1965)

=== As composer ===
- Sanford and Son (1976) (Season 6, episode 2)

== Live albums ==
- Joe Williams Live – Joe Williams (1973)
- Live in San Francisco – Hampton Hawes (1976)

== Archival recordings ==
- Guitars '65 (California Creamin') - Carol Kaye (1965)
- Better Days - Carol Kaye (1971)
- I Don't Know What's On Your Mind – Carol Kaye and Spider Webb (1976)
- Picking Up On The E-String - Carol Kaye (1995)
