= Songs of Experience (David Axelrod album) =

Studio album by David Axelrod
- Released: October 1969
- Genre: Jazz fusion
- Length: 32:01
- Label: Capitol
- Producer: David Axelrod

David Axelrod chronology
Song of Innocence (1968)	Songs of Experience (1969)	Earth Rot (1970)

Songs of Experience is the second studio album by American composer and producer David Axelrod. It was released in October 1969 by Capitol Records. Axelrod composed, arranged, and produced the album while recording with session musicians such as guitarist Al Casey, bassist Carol Kaye, drummer Earl Palmer, and conductor Don Randi.

As with his 1968 debut album Song of Innocence, Axelrod and his musicians performed musical interpretations of English poet William Blake's Songs of Innocence and of Experience, an 18th-century illustrated collection of poems. A jazz fusion album, Songs of Experience explores darker sounds than its predecessor, as the poems Axelrod selected dealt with the darker side of humanity. Its music was partly inspired by composer Gunther Schuller's Third Stream concept. Axelrod composed Baroque orchestrations with rock, R&B, pop, and folk music elements.

Songs of Experience received retrospective acclaim from critics, who found Axelrod's compositions musically varied and innovative. In the years since its original release, musicians also praised it as a source for sampling in hip hop production. Some of its songs have been sampled frequently by hip hop artists and producers. In 2000, the album was reissued by EMI.

== Background ==
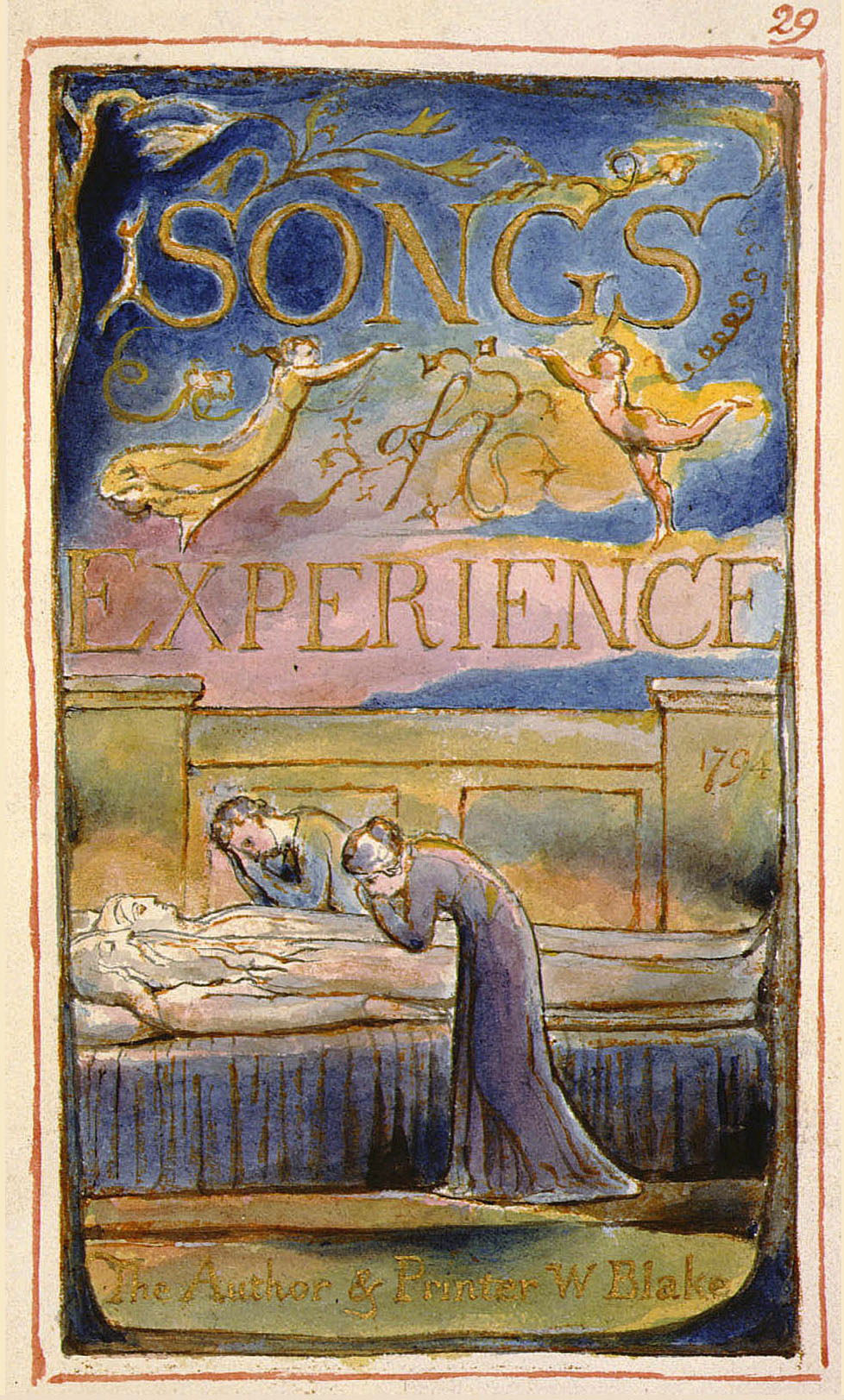
The album was inspired by Songs of Experience, an illustration collection of poems by William Blake.

As he had on the 1968 album Song of Innocence, Axelrod composed musical interpretations of the works of English poet William Blake on Songs of Experience. He used eight poems from Blake's Songs of Experience (1794). The album's gatefold packaging featured Blake's poems reprinted for each song and liner notes that stated, "an anthology of awareness after birth ... based on the 18th century poems of William Blake." Blake's poems began with the premise of birth and innocence, and explored themes of life experience, rite of passage, and changes of perspective in life.

== Musical style ==
"The Human Abstract"
According to AllMusic's Thom Jurek, the song evokes themes of "unrepentant youth" and "the high-flying impetuousness of the restless spirit".

A jazz fusion album, Songs of Experience was partly inspired by Gunther Schuller's Third Stream concept, which fused American jazz with European classical music. Axelrod supported his Baroque orchestrations on the album with rhythms and melodies from rock, R&B, and pop music. The album's suite is more orchestral and less rock-oriented than Song of Innocence. Its symphony is embellished with percussive sounds, British and Irish folk song elements, and stylistic innovations from contemporary arranger Gerald Wilson.

With Songs of Experience, Axelrod explored darker sounds, as the poems he had chosen dealt with the darker side of humanity. For "The Human Abstract", he used ascending piano, bass, and percussion instruments to evoke the ghost described in Blake's poem. It is a bass-driven, funky song that juxtaposes augmented sevenths strummed on an electric guitar against an acoustic piano and muted horns. According to music critic Thom Jurek, "The Divine Image" and "A Little Girl Lost" elicit feelings of majesty and "pastoral sadness", respectively. "London" was recorded by Axelrod as a tone poem to reflect Blake's opening stanza about the spiritual climate of London at the onset of the Industrial Revolution: "I wander thro' each charted'd street / Near where the chart'd Thames does flow / And mark in every face I meet / Marks of weakness, marks of woe."

== Reception and legacy ==
Songs of Experience was released in October 1969 by Capitol Records on stereo LP. It was reissued on CD in 2000 by EMI. In a retrospective review, AllMusic's Thom Jurek gave the album four-and-a-half out of five stars and said that Axelrod "succeeded in spades" in his search for a sound that "best exemplified not only his feelings but also the heady text he sought to sonically illustrate." Jurek felt that his compositions were diverse, lush, and able to resemble literature by "using as much space as they do sound for dramatic and dynamic effect", and that Axelrod created original palettes for rock instrumentation through his complex use of the horn section's "various colors". Lynell George of the Los Angeles Times called it a "prescient, genre-defying" solo project, and NME journalist John Mulvey viewed it as a "landmark" album. Mojo cited the album, along with Song of Innocence, as Axelrod's artistic peak and particularly praised "The Human Abstract" as "beautiful and blank", evoking "the view from Arthur Lee's castle of an endless pale blue sky and the vast deathly city beneath it." Tom Hull was less receptive, giving the album a B grade and calling it "the sort of high schmaltz you often get with movie music, with at least one cut ('The Fly') transcending the level of dreck".

Songs from the album have been sampled frequently by hip hop producers and artists, including Black Moon, who sampled "A Divine Image", and DJ Shadow, who sampled the luminous piano line from "The Human Abstract" on his 1996 song "Midnight in a Perfect World". English hip hop producer Metabeats called Songs of Experience one of his favorite sources for sampling music and said of the album in an interview for Hip Hop Connection: "You could sample everything on this record, and I think everyone already has. Axelrod is pretty much a sound library in himself – the quality is amazing." American musician John McEntire ranked it third on his list of top-five albums and called it "early crate-digger stuff. Great, funky rhythm-section playing, crazy, overblown string arrangements." In a 2000 interview for The Wire, rapper and producer Mike Ladd spoke of the album recording "London", deeming it "crazy stuff" that deviated from the one-dimensional rhythm loops of contemporary hip hop production. He went on the say, "this is definitely the kind of stuff I'm planning to do for the next album, incorporate more fusion elements and stuff like that. This is a really good production. I like it because it's little parts with gaps, which I don't normally have. Somebody told me I should listen to [Axelrod]. This is one I'm definitely going to buy I'd like to do more stuff with complicated melodies, everybody playing together, drum breaks, things like that."

== Track listing ==
All songs were composed, arranged, and produced by David Axelrod.

Side one
No.	Title	Length
1.	"A Poison Tree"	3:10
2.	"A Little Girl Lost"	3:24
3.	"London"	2:47
4.	"The Sick Rose"	4:47

Side two
No.	Title	Length
1.	"The School Boy"	2:30
2.	"The Human Abstract"	5:32
3.	"The Fly"	4:50
4.	"A Divine Image"	4:39

== Personnel ==
Credits are adapted from the album's liner notes.

- John Arnold – musician
- David Axelrod – arranger, composer, producer
- Benjamin Barrett – musician
- Samuel Boghossian – musician
- Bobby Bruce – musician
- Al Casey – musician
- Gary Coleman – musician
- Douglas Davis – musician
- Allen De Rienzo – musician
- Al Dinkin – musician
- David Duke – musician
- James Getzoff – musician
- John Groomer – musician
- Terry Hatton – musician
- Fredereck Hill – musician
- William Hymanson – musician
- Robert Jung – musician
- Armard Kaproff – musician
- Carol Kaye – musician
- Richard Leith – musician
- Lew McCreary – musician
- Arthur Maebe – musician
- Louis Morell – musician
- Gareth Nuttycombe – musician
- Earl Palmer – musician
- Don Randi – conductor, musician
- Myron Sandler – musician
- Sidney Sharp – musician
- Jack Shulman – musician
- Freddie Slatkin – musician
- Jeffrey Solow – musician
- Marshall Sosson – musician
- Robert Sushel – musician
- Anthony Terran – musician
- Rex Updegraft – engineer
- Kenneth Watson – musician

== See also ==
- William Blake in popular culture
