= More Mission: Impossible =

Soundtrack album by Lalo Schifrin
- Released: 1969
- Recorded: October 23 and 26, 1968
- Studio: Los Angeles
- Genre: Jazz
- Length: 28:48
- Label: Paramount – PAS 5002
- Producer: Tom Mack

Lalo Schifrin chronology
There's a Whole Lalo Schifrin Goin' On (1968)	More Mission: Impossible (1969)	Mannix (1968)

More Mission Impossible is an album featuring music composed and conducted by Lalo Schifrin recorded in 1968 and released on the Paramount label. As with Music from Mission: Impossible (1967) the music on this album is rerecorded and extended scores that were originally commissioned for the TV series Mission: Impossible.

The liner notes were written by JazzTimes music critic Harvey Siders. He said that "each track could be lifted right out of context and stand alone as a compact treatise on rock-tinged, big-band jazz." He described "Mission Blues" as blues with a boogie woogie rhythm and funk elements, and noticed that "Self-Destruct" contained a "rarity: a jazz chimes solo" from the percussion department. He said that the "Danube Incident" was peacefully atmospheric, featuring the exotic Eastern European sound of the cymbalom.

In 1994, Portishead sampled the track "Danube Incident" for their song "Sour Times", speeding the original tune up in tempo which also increased its pitch. "Sour Times" became Portishead's most successful single.

== Track listing ==
All compositions by Lalo Schifrin except as indicated

1. "Mission Blues" – 2:47
2. "Self-Destruct" – 2:37
3. "Affair in Madrid" – 2:31
4. "Midnight Courier" – 3:25
5. "The Chelsea Memorandum" (Shorty Rogers) – 2:59
6. "More Mission" – 2:45
7. "Intrigue" – 2:30
8. "Danube Incident" – 1:52
9. "Foul Play" (Richard Hazard) – 2:29
10. "The Getaway" – 2:22
11. "Mission: Impossible" – 2:31
- Recorded in Los Angeles, California on October 23 and 26, 1968

== Personnel ==
- Lalo Schifrin – arranger, composer, conductor
- Conte Candoli, Graham Young, John Audino, Bobby Bryant – trumpet
- Lloyd Ulyate, Dick Nash, Dick Noel, Milt Bernhart, George Roberts – trombone
- Bud Shank, Ronny Lang, Plas Johnson, John Lowe, Gene Cipriano – reeds
- Mike Melvoin – piano, electric piano, organ
- Tommy Tedesco, Howard Roberts – guitar
- Ray Brown – bass
- Carol Kaye – electric bass
- Larry Bunker, Ken Watson, Emil Richards, Francisco Aguabella – percussion
- Robert Helfer – orchestra manager
- Dick Hazard, Milt Rogers – arranger, composer
- John Neal – engineer
- Apple Graphics – album design
- Christopher Whorf – art direction
