= Song of Innocence =

Studio album by David Axelrod
- Released: October 1968
- Recorded: 1968
- Studio: Capitol (Los Angeles)
- Genres: Jazz fusion; baroque pop; psychedelic R&B; art pop
- Length: 26:35
- Label: Capitol
- Producer: David Axelrod

David Axelrod chronology
Song of Innocence (1968)	Songs of Experience (1969)

Song of Innocence is the debut album by American composer and producer David Axelrod. It was released in October 1968 by Capitol Records. In an effort to capitalize on the experimental climate of popular music at the time, Axelrod composed the album as a suite-like tone poem interpreting Songs of Innocence, a 1789 illustrated collection of poems by William Blake. Recording took place at Capitol Studios in Los Angeles with an orchestra and studio musicians from the Wrecking Crew collective, including keyboardist and conductor Don Randi, guitarist Al Casey, bassist Carol Kaye, and drummer Earl Palmer.

An instrumental jazz fusion record, Song of Innocence incorporates elements of classical, rock, funk, pop, and theatre music. Axelrod arranged the music for bass, drums, and string instruments, composing in a rock idiom with tempos centered on such rhythms played by Palmer. He used contrast in his orchestral compositions, interspersing their euphoric psychedelic R&B structures with dramatic, harrowing arrangements to reflect the supernatural themes found in Blake's poems. The resulting music's reverent, psychedelic overtones have been interpreted as evoking the poet's themes of innocence and spirituality.

While innovative for its application of rock and jazz techniques, Song of Innocence was not commercially successful and confounded contemporary critics, who viewed it as an ambitious but foolish curiosity piece. In the 1990s, critics reassessed the album as a classic, while leading disc jockeys in hip hop and electronica rediscovered and sampled its songs. "Holy Thursday", the record's best-known track, was frequently sampled by hip hop producers. The renewed interest in Axelrod's work prompted Stateside Records to reissue Song of Innocence in 2000.

== Background ==
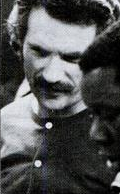
Axelrod c. 1970

In the 1960s, Axelrod worked as a producer and A&R executive for Capitol Records in Los Angeles. During this time, he began to conceive his own musical ideas, involving a fusion of baroque classical sounds, R&B rhythms, and spiritual themes. Challenged by what he described as a "new breed of record buyer ... more sophisticated in his thinking", he was one of several Los Angeles–based musical eccentrics during the late 1960s who wanted to expand on the mid-1960s studio experiments of Brian Wilson and George Martin. His first attempt at this creative vision was composing a religious-themed, psychedelic opera for the Electric Prunes, a local garage rock group. When the band found it too challenging to finish the recording, Axelrod enlisted studio musicians from the Wrecking Crew to complete the album, released as Mass in F Minor in 1968. The recording attracted both controversy and national fame for the producer.

After the success of Mass in F Minor, Axelrod was asked by Capitol to record a similar album. He wanted to further capitalize on the experimental climate of popular music and chose to adapt works by English poet William Blake on an album. Blake musical settings were at the height of their popularity among musicians and composers. Numerous serious music composers had set his poems to music since the 1870s, and the practice was eventually adapted in other musical fields during the 20th century, including popular music, musical theatre, and the 1960s folk idiom. Axelrod, a self-professed "Blake freak", had been fascinated by Blake's painting and poetry since his late teens and frequently read the poems as an adult. He conceived Song of Innocence after he had bought an edition of Blake's complete poetry while working in Capitol's art department and considered the concept for a few years before Mass in F Minor. Axelrod was not sociable with colleagues, such as record executives who could have helped him professionally, and felt that he could identify with Blake; he considered the poet "very bad at making new friends".

== Recording ==
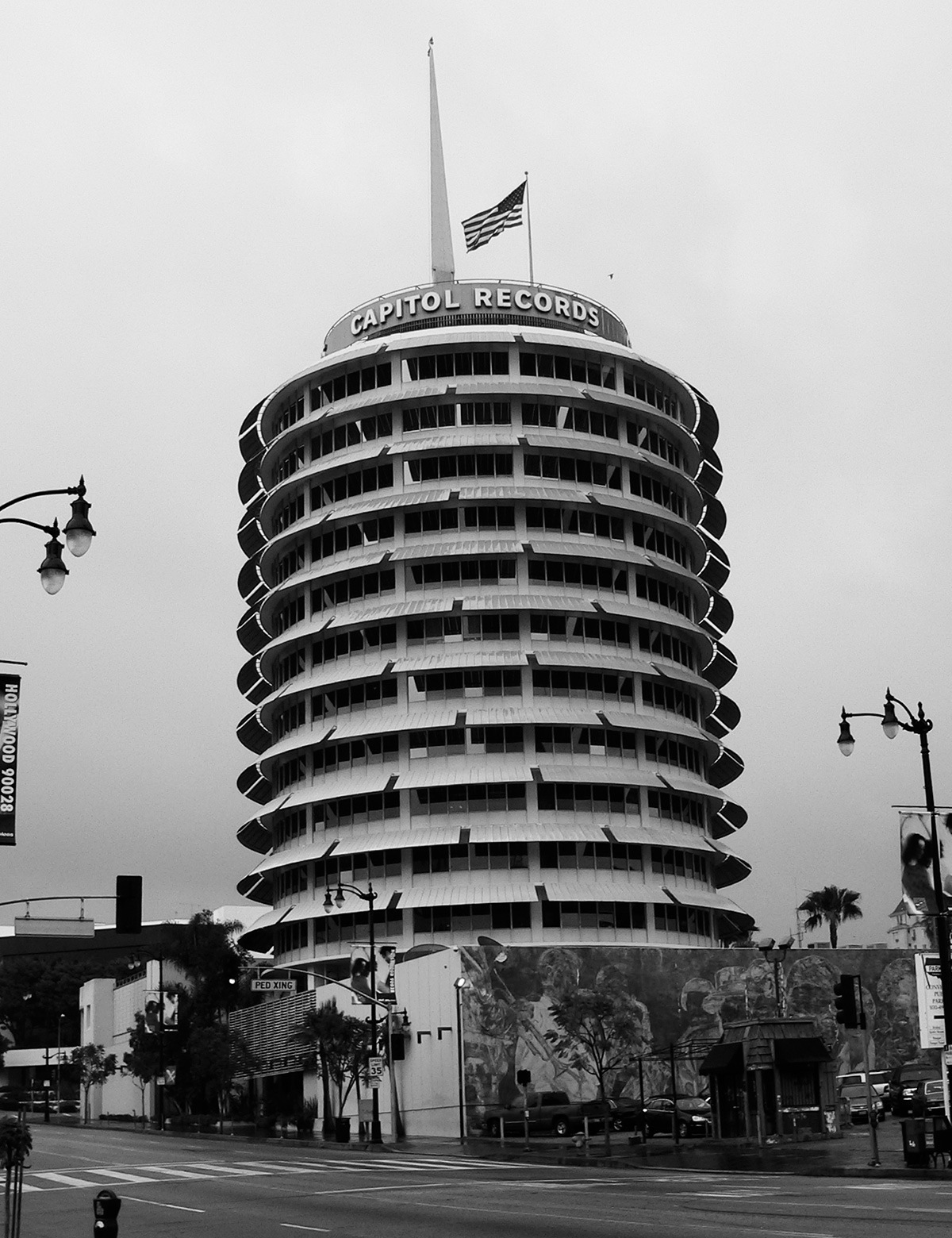
The Capitol Records Building (in 2006), which houses Capitol Studios

Axelrod composed Song of Innocence in one week and began recording in mid-1968. He recorded the album at Capitol Studios in Los Angeles with his close-knit group of veteran studio musicians from the Wrecking Crew, including keyboardist and conductor Don Randi, guitarist Al Casey, bassist Carol Kaye, and drummer Earl Palmer. He had worked with them before when producing sessions for Capitol recording artists.

Axelrod did not play any instruments on Song of Innocence; he instead wrote arrangements for his orchestra and utilized 33 players to perform his notated charts. He had learned how to read and orchestrate complex music charts from jazz musicians during the 1950s. Randi conducted the orchestra and played both piano and organ on the record. Axelrod preferred listening to a session from a recording booth like his contemporary Igor Stravinsky. "That way the sounds don't seem to go all over the place", he later said. "Music seems so small in a studio." Axelrod originally wanted some of the album's compositions to feature a large-scale choir but was uncertain if he could find the appropriate ensemble, so he recorded an entirely instrumental album and included one Blake setting for each section of the score.

== Composition and performance ==
A jazz fusion album, Song of Innocence combines jazz elements with impressionistic musical figures and hard rock guitar solos. Its music also incorporates funk, rock, theatre, and pop styles. Music journalists categorized the record as jazz-rock, baroque pop, and psychedelic R&B. John Murph of JazzTimes magazine said the music could be better characterized as art pop than jazz. Axelrod, who had produced bebop albums before working for Capitol, asserted that jazz played a crucial role in the music: "For years, all I did was jazz. When I first got in the record business, I was so into jazz that I had never heard Elvis Presley. I still probably listen to jazz more than anything else."

"Holy Thursday"
"Holy Thursday" mixes boogaloo and classical elements with jazzy piano and a soaring chorus played by the string and horn sections.

Axelrod composed the album as a tone poem suite based on Blake's illustrated 1789 collection of poems Songs of Innocence. His compositions borrowed titles from Blake's poems, which dealt with themes such as visions, religious iniquity, rite of passage, and life experience after a person's birth and innocence. Mary Campbell of The Baltimore Sun said the classical and Christian church music elements made the record sound "reverent, as if describing a biblical story". Les Inrockuptibles described it as a "psyche-liturgical" work dedicated to Blake. According to AllMusic's Thom Jurek, psychedelia was implicit in the record's musical form and feeling, which impelled Axelrod to "celebrate the wildness and folly of youth with celebration and verve".

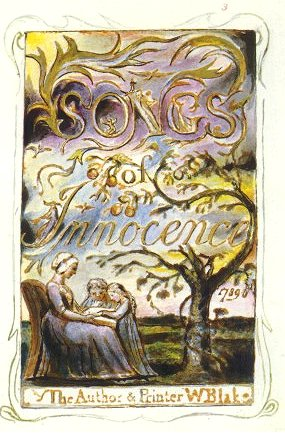
Title plate for William Blake's Songs of Innocence

The album's music was written in the rock idiom and arranged for bass, drums, and strings. As a composer, Axelrod abandoned the conventional unison approach to orchestral writing in favor of more contrasts while centering his tempos around rock-based drum patterns played mostly in common time by Palmer. He utilized his instrumental ensemble as a rock orchestra, playing melodramatic strings and pronounced, echo-laden breakbeats. The music was also embellished with electric piano, intricate basslines, Echoplex effects, and elements of suspense Axelrod used to reflect the supernatural themes found in Blake's poems. According to David N. Howard, the album's "euphorically" upbeat psychedelic R&B form was interspersed by "dramatically sparse" and "harrowing" arrangements.

Axelrod and his musicians used key musical phrases that are expanded upon throughout Song of Innocence. He was interested in György Ligeti's 1961 piece Atmosphères and Lukas Foss' idea of starting a piece with a sustained chord, having musicians improvise over 100 bars, and ending with another chord as they finish. "Urizen" opened with long sustained chords, sound effects, reverbed guitar stabs, and a supple bassline. On "Holy Thursday", the rhythm section played a slow, jazzed-out groove and bluesy bop piano lines, as a big band vamp was played by a large-scale string section. In response to their swing style, the brass section and guitarists played dramatic, high-pitched overtones built around a complex melody. The middle of the album featured more traditional jazz passages and the presence of a psychedelic harpsichord. "The Smile" was recorded with a rhythmic drum beat, offbeat bass, and a progressive string part. For the songs near the end, the musicians steadily transitioned to heady psychedelia featuring gritty guitars and disorienting organ licks. On "The Mental Traveler", Axelrod said he tried to experiment with atonality but "chickened out".

== Release and reception ==
Song of Innocence was released in October 1968 by Capitol Records and attracted considerable interest from critics. Writing for Gramophone in 1969, Nigel Hunter found the songs to be "of absorbing power and depth", but complained of the electric guitar parts. Alasdair Clayre, in the same magazine, questioned whether the "occasional guitar gobbling" reflected Axelrod's genuine ideas or "an obligatory concession to contemporary sound", but he ultimately regarded Song of Innocence as a compelling record. In his opinion, the producer's impressions of Blake "reveal a depth of imagination and skill warranting attention beyond the confines of pop music", proving he could compose innovative pieces for a large orchestra, which Clayre felt comprised the best of California's studio musicians on the album. Billboard magazine called it "an aesthetic mix of music and philosophy ... chock full of mysticism, creativity, and change", believing that Axelrod's idyllic music would be interesting enough to impact the record charts.

Others were more critical, finding the music foolish. Stereo Review magazine's Paul Kresh appraised the album negatively, calling it pretentious, inadequate, and dependent on movie music tricks and outdated techniques such as forced climaxes and gaudy orchestration. He said it falls severely short of the concept Axelrod aspired to and that "only the most uneducated will be taken in by the mountains of misterioso claptrap that surround these squeaking musical mice". Nat Freedland from Entertainment World accused Axelrod of "indulging himself here to little avail".

Song of Innocence received radio exposure on both AM and FM stations with songs such as the title track and "Holy Thursday", which became the album's best-known recording. The album was not a commercial success, however, and only sold 75,000 copies by October 1969.

== Legacy and influence ==
Song of Innocence made critics turn their heads in its day, regarding it as a visionary curiosity piece; today it's simply a great, timeless work of pop art that continues to inspire over three decades after its initial release.

— Thom Jurek (AllMusic, 2002)

Song of Innocence was one of many concept albums recorded as rock music was developing in various directions during the late 1960s, following in the wake of the Beatles' 1967 album Sgt. Pepper's Lonely Hearts Club Band. It was innovative for its original application of both rock and jazz techniques. According to music journalist Zaid Mudhaffer, the term "jazz fusion" was coined in a review of the record when it was released. Axelrod followed the album in 1969 with the similarly Blake-inspired Songs of Experience, which adapted Gunther Schuller's third stream concept to baroque orchestrations and rock, pop, and R&B rhythms and melodies. Both albums established Axelrod as an unpredictable, challenging conceptual artist. His instrumental interpretations of Blake were the first in jazz, followed in 1971 by Rafał Augustyn's Niewinność and Adrian Mitchell's musical Tyger: A Celebration of William Blake with composer Mike Westbrook; Westbrook later composed more Blake-inspired works, including The Westbrook Blake: "Bright as Fire" (1980).

During the late 1990s, Axelrod's records were reassessed and considered innovative by critics, including Song of Innocence, which was regarded as a classic. Mojo cited it as "the heart of Axelrod's legacy", while John Mulvey from NME called it "sky-kissingly high and divine", finding Axelrod versatile enough to "soar above his own pretensions", Writing for AllMusic, John Bush said the album "sounded like nothing else from its era", while Thom Jurek argued that it continued to sound new upon each listen due to a lack of "cynicism and hipper-than-thou posturing" in the music. In a four-and-a-half star retrospective review, Jurek said it was innovative in 1968 and still "withstands the test of time better than the Beatles Sgt. Pepper's Lonely Hearts Club Band album that allegedly inspired it". Giving it a five-out-of-five score, Tiny Mix Tapes said it sounded engagingly magnificent and diverse, citing it as one of the most dynamic musical fusions and "one of the most unique and thought provoking musical efforts of the last several decades".

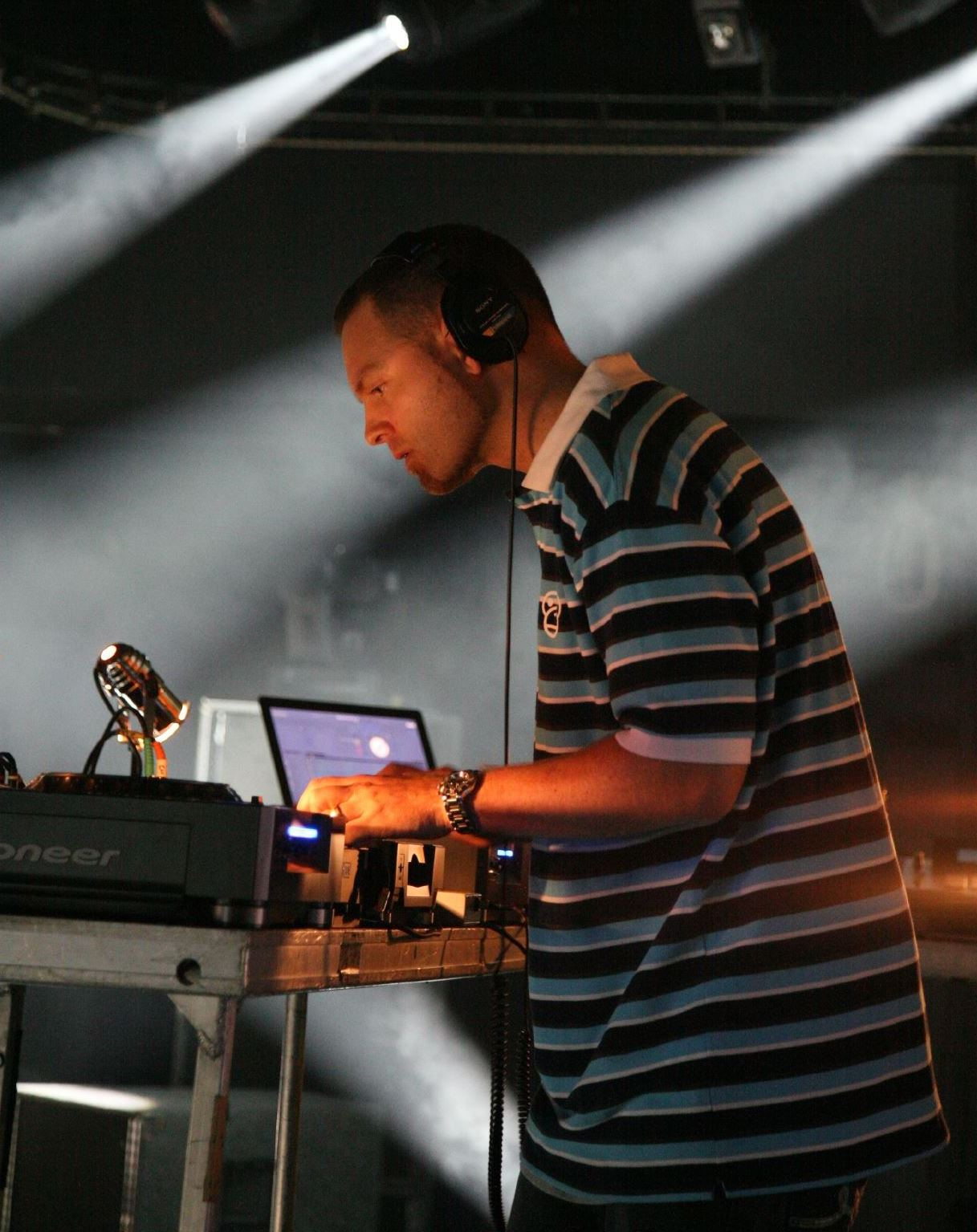
Song of Innocence has been sampled by various record producers since being rediscovered in the 1990s, including DJ Shadow (2006).

Axelrod's music was also rediscovered and sampled by leading disc jockeys in the 1990s including hip hop producers. When sampling in hip hop peaked during the early and mid-1990s, they searched for archived records with atmospheric beats and strings to sample. Los Angeles–based disc jockey B+ recalled finding a copy of Song of Innocence at a Goodwill in Culver City and said it appealed to him because of its dissonant quality, musical dynamics, and string sound: "This big sound. It was like somehow [Axelrod] was summoning the future, that you can project this environment, this moment into the future." Electronica pioneers such as DJ Cam and DJ Shadow also sampled Song of Innocence. The latter producer sampled the record's choral themes and piano motifs on his influential debut album Endtroducing..... (1996). "The Smile" was sampled by Pete Rock on his 1998 song "Strange Fruit" and by DJ Premier on Royce da 5'9"'s 2009 song "Shake This". "Holy Thursday" was frequently sampled by producers, including The Beatnuts on their 1994 song "Hit Me with That", UNKLE on their 1998 song "Rabbit in Your Headlights", and Swizz Beatz on Lil Wayne's 2008 song "Dr. Carter".

The renewed interest in Axelrod's work prompted Stateside Records to reissue Song of Innocence in 2000. Reviewing the re-release, Now wrote that after sounding odd during the 1960s, the songs had become "a sampler's dream come true". David Keenan attributed Axelrod's sampling legacy to "the original badass drummer" Palmer. In his appraisal for The Wire, he facetiously critiqued that the songs "may reek of stale joss sticks and patchouli-scented self-actualisation, but in their very datedness they somehow sound very modern." Pitchfork journalist Sean Fennessey later said Axelrod's first two records were "essential if only as a tour guide through early 90s hip-hop", having "literally been a rap producer's delight for years". In a 2013 list for Complex, DJ and production duo Kon and Amir named "Holy Thursday" the greatest hip hop sample of all time. In 2017, Pitchfork ranked the album 144th on a list of "The 200 Best Albums of the 1960s", and in an accompanying essay, Louis Pattison acknowledged how hip hop crate diggers "recognized the holy, beautiful vision" of Axelrod's rhythmic compositions.

In 2018, Song of Innocence was given another re-release, this time by Now-Again Records. It featured a new remaster by Randi, H. B. Barnum, and Axelrod's widow, Terri, along with sleeve notes written by Eothen Alapatt, Now-Again's CEO. According to Alapatt's notes, Axelrod once told him that Miles Davis played the album before conceiving his own fusion of jazz and rock for Bitches Brew (1970).

== Track listing ==
All songs were written, arranged, and produced by David Axelrod.

Side one
No.	Title	Length
1.	"Urizen"	3:56
2.	"Holy Thursday"	5:30
3.	"The Smile"	3:25
4.	"A Dream"	2:26

Side two
No.	Title	Length
1.	"Song of Innocence"	4:32
2.	"Merlin's Prophecy"	2:43
3.	"The Mental Traveler"	4:03

== Personnel ==
Credits were adapted from the album's liner notes.

- David Axelrod – arranger, producer, vocals
- Benjamin Barrett – musician
- Arnold Belnick – musician
- Harry Bluestone – violin
- Bobby Bruce – musician
- Al Casey – guitar
- Gary Coleman – background vocals
- Douglas Davis – musician
- Alvin Dinkin – musician
- Gene Estes – percussion
- Anne Goodman – musician
- Freddie Hill – trumpet
- Bill Hinshaw – musician
- Harry Hyams – musician
- Carol Kaye – bass
- Raphael Kramer – musician
- Richard Leith – trombone
- Arthur Maebe – horn
- Leonard Malarsky – musician
- Lew McCreary – horn
- Ollie Mitchell – trumpet
- Gareth Nuttycombe – musician
- Rob Owen – reissue co-ordination (2000)
- Earl Palmer – drums
- Joe Polito – engineer
- Don Randi – conductor, organ, piano
- The Red Room – artwork re-generation (2000)
- Nigel Reeve – reissue co-ordination (2000)
- Allen Di Rienzo – musician
- Howard Roberts – guitar
- Vincent de Rosa – horn
- Nathan Ross – musician
- Henry Roth – musician
- Myron Sandler – musician
- Harold Schneier – musician
- Sid Sharp – musician
- Jack Shulman – musician
- Henry Sigismonti – wind instrument
- Marshall Sosson – musician
- Tony Terran – musician
- Pete Wyant – musician
- Tibor Zelig – musician

== Release history ==
Region	Date	Label	Format	Catalog
United States	October 1968	Capitol Records	stereo LP	ST-2982
United Kingdom	1968	Capitol Records	stereo LP	ST-2982
United States	1975	Capitol Records	stereo LP reissue	ST-11362
United Kingdom	2000	Stateside Records, EMI	CD reissue	5 21588

== See also ==
- Songs of Innocence and Experience (Allen Ginsberg album)
- William Blake in popular culture

== Bibliography ==
- Anon. (September 28, 1968). "Album Reviews". Billboard. Vol. 80, no. 39. Cincinnati. p. 30 – via Google Books.
- Anon. (September 28, 1968). "Axelrod: Hunter of New Sounds". Billboard. Vol. 80, no. 39. Los Angeles – via Google Books.
- Anon. (October 3, 1969). "Al DeLory & David Axelrod". Entertainment World. 1 (1). Hollywood.
- Anon. (January 20, 1979). "Talent in Action – Freddie Hubbard, Joe Sample, Joe Farrell, David Axelrod". Billboard. Vol. 91, no. 3. Los Angeles. p. 68 – via Google Books.
- Anon. (December 28, 1999). "Top 10 Reissues". Now. Vol. 20, no. 17. Toronto. Archived from the original on May 2, 2014.
- Anon. (2000). Song of Innocence (CD reissue booklet). David Axelrod. London: Stateside Records. 7243 5 21588 2 9.
- Anon. (2001). "David Axelrod". The Fader (7). New York. Archived from the original on January 7, 2015.
- Anon. (January 2006). "Reissues". Mojo (146). London.
- Anon. (2007). "DJ Shadow". In Irvin, Jim; McLear, Colin (eds.). The Mojo Collection (4th ed.). Canongate Books. ISBN 978-1-84767-643-6.
- Anon. (2009). "David Axelrod's 'Live at the Royal Festival Hall' on vinyl". Fact (March 5). London.
- Anon. (2013). "1. David Axelrod "Holy Thursday" (1968) — Kon + Amir Present: The 50 Greatest Hip-Hop Samples of All Time". Complex (May 17). New York. Archived from the original on June 24, 2013.
- Anon. (n.d.). "Rare Record Price Guide". Metropolis International. (subscription required)
- Benbow, Julian (2008). "On 'Carter III,' Lil' Wayne perfects the art of the brag". Boston Globe. No. June 9. Archived from the original on May 2, 2014.
- Bonner, Michael (August 23, 2018). "David Axelrod – Song Of Innocence". Uncut.
- Bush, John (n.d.). "David Axelrod – Music Biography, Credits and Discography". AllMusic. Archived from the original on February 11, 2013.
- Campbell, Mary (October 21, 1968). "Rock Influence". The Baltimore Sun. (subscription required)
- Weiner, Johan; Sylvester, Nick; Eells, Josh; Christgau, Robert (June 11, 2008). "The Great Lil Wayne Debate: Is Tha Carter III a Classic?". Blender. New York. Archived from the original on October 26, 2012.
- Clayre, Alasdair (April 1969). "Keeping Track: A Cross Section of Recent Popular LPs, EPs and Singles". Gramophone. 46. London.
- Conte, Christophe (2000). "David Axelrod". Les Inrockuptibles (in French) (November 30). Paris.
- Cotner, David (2006). "David Cotner scopes out 7" records, 3" CDs and other odds & ends". Signal to Noise (41). Burlington.
- Fennessey, Sean (September 15, 2005). "David Axelrod: The Edge: David Axelrod At Capitol 1966–1970". Pitchfork. Archived from the original on June 2, 2013.
- Fitch, Donald (1990). Blake Set to Music: A Bibliography of Musical Settings of the Poems and Prose of William Blake. University of California Press. ISBN 0520097343.
- Freedland, Nat (October 3, 1969). "Music–Recording". Entertainment World. 1 (1). Hollywood.
- George, Lynell (2007). "Replay". Los Angeles Times. No. June 3. Archived from the original on April 8, 2014.
- Goh, Daryl (2006). "David Axelrod's The Edge of Music: An Exploration of 50 Years in Music". The Star. No. February 27. Malaysia. Archived from the original on May 2, 2014.
- Howard, David N. (2004). Sonic Alchemy: Visionary Music Producers and Their Maverick Recordings. Hal Leonard Corporation. ISBN 0634055607.
- Howey, Ann F.; Stephen Ray, Reimer (2006). A Bibliography of Modern Arthuriana (1500–2000). Boydell & Brewer. ISBN 1843840685.
- Hunter, Nigel (1969). "The Critics' Choice—1969". Gramophone. 47 (December). London: 928.
- Jurek, Thom (n.d.). "Song of Innocence – David Axelrod : Songs, Reviews, Credits, Awards". AllMusic. Archived from the original on March 13, 2013.
- Keenan, David (2000). "Boomerang – New reissues: rated on the rebound". The Wire (197–202). London: 54.
- Kern (n.d.). "David Axelrod – Songs of Innocence". Tiny Mix Tapes. Archived from the original on August 13, 2012.
- Kresh, Paul (March 1969). "Stereo Tape". Stereo Review. 22 (3). New York: 115.
- Lewis, Roger (1972). Outlaws of America: The Underground Press and Its Context. Penguin Books. ISBN 0140215867.
- Monson, Karen (1968). "His Own Things". Los Angeles Times. No. December 31. (subscription required)
- Mudhaffer, Zaid (January 20, 2014). "Heavy Axe: A Guide to David Axelrod". Red Bull Music Academy. Archived from the original on February 23, 2014.
- Mulvey, John (2000). "David Axelrod – Songs of Innocence/ Songs of Experience". NME (May 17). London. Archived from the original on August 23, 2000.
- Murph, John (2005). "Autumn Chill: 41 of the Season's Best Albums, Part II". JazzTimes (November). Quincy. Archived from the original on February 17, 2012.
- Pattison, Louis (August 22, 2017). "The 200 Best Albums of the 1960s: 144) David Axelrod - Song of Innocence (1968)". Pitchfork.
- Schwann, William (1970). "Long Playing Record Catalog". Schwann Monthly Guide to Stereo Records. 22 (1–3). Cambridge.
- Sonksen, Mike (June 15, 2012). "LA Letters > Songs of Innocence and Experience: The Tone Poems of David Axelrod and William Blake". KCET. Archived from the original on March 26, 2013.
- Tiegel, Eliot (July 17, 1971). "Axelrod: Trend to Blend Sounds". Billboard. Vol. 83, no. 29. Los Angeles – via Google Books.
- Unterberger, Richie (2000). David Axelrod's Rock Interpretation of Handel's Messiah (LP reissue liner notes). David Axelrod. New York: RCA Records. LSP-4636.
- Unterberger, Richie (n.d.). "Heavy Axe – David Axelrod". AllMusic. Archived from the original on May 8, 2013.
- Wolfson, Richard (March 16, 2004). "The alchemist of crossover". The Daily Telegraph. London. Archived from the original on May 3, 2014.
