= In Cold Blood (soundtrack) =

Soundtrack album by Quincy Jones
- Released: 1967
- Recorded: 1967 at RCA Victor's Music Center of the World
- Genre: Film score
- Length: 31:41
- Labels: Colgems; COM/COS 107
- Producer: Neely Plumb

Quincy Jones chronology
In the Heat of the Night (1967)	In Cold Blood (1967)	For Love of Ivy (1968)

In Cold Blood is a 1967 film score for the film In Cold Blood, composed, arranged and conducted by Quincy Jones. The soundtrack album was released on the Colgems label in 1967.

Truman Capote lobbied unsuccessfully to have Jones removed from the film. According to Jones, Capote called director Richard Brooks and said "Richard, I don't understand why you've got a Negro doing the music for a film with no people of color in it.' And Richard Brooks said, 'Fuck you, he's doing the music". Capote later apologized to Jones.

The Vinyl Factory said "The opening title track, with its galloping drums and corrosive strings, lets you know you are entering a bleak musical terrain. "Perry's Theme", which begins with a beatific Spanish guitar, mutates into something terrifying, as strings rise and fall ominously. With its harrowing organ blasts, "Murder Scene" is a haunting aural crime photo. At the time, this menacing soundtrack was considered a convention breaker not only for Jones, but also for black composers in Hollywood".

== Personnel ==
- Orchestra arranged and conducted by Quincy Jones
  - Gil Bernal − vocals (track 10)
  - Buddy Childers − trumpet
  - Frank Rosolino − trombone
  - Dave Grusin − clavinet
  - Gene Cipriano, Bud Shank, William Green − woodwinds
  - Howard Roberts − guitar
  - Ray Brown, Andy Simpkins − bass
  - Carol Kaye − electric bass
  - Shelly Manne, Earl Palmer − drums
  - Don Elliott, Emil Richards − percussion
