= Earth Rot =

Studio album by David Axelrod
- Released: April 22, 1970
- Genre: Baroque pop
- Length: 28:50
- Label: Capitol
- Producer: David Axelrod

David Axelrod chronology
| Songs of Experience (1969) | Earth Rot (1970) | Rock Messiah (1971) |

Professional ratings
Review scores
| Source | Rating |
|---|---|
| Allmusic | 4/5 stars |

Earth Rot is an album by David Axelrod that released in 1970. The album was recorded with a choir singing from the Book of Isaiah and "Song of the Earth Spirit", a Navajo myth, and an orchestra that included Earl Palmer and Ernie Watts.

== Track listing ==
All music composed by David Axelrod; "lyrics adapted by Michael T. Axelrod from The Book of Isaiah, The Old Testament and adapted from Song of the Earth Spirit, a Navajo origin legend."

Side 1

1. "The Warnings Part 1" – 2:52
2. "The Warnings Part 2" – 4:27
3. "The Warnings Part 3" – 5:06
4. "The Warnings Part 4" – 3:11

Side 2

1. "The Signs Part 1" – 3:43
2. "The Signs Part 2" – 3:43
3. "The Signs Part 3" – 2:36
4. "The Signs Part 4" – 3:12

== Personnel ==
- Allen De Rienzo – trumpet
- Frederick Hill – trumpet
- Dick Hyde – trombone
- Richard Leith – trombone
- William E. Green – tenor saxophone, baritone saxophone, flute
- Jackie Kelso – tenor saxophone, baritone saxophone, flute
- Ernie Watts – tenor saxophone, flute
- Don Randi – piano
- Sonny Anderson – vibraphone
- Gary Coleman – vibraphone
- Dennis Budimir – guitar
- Louis Morell – guitar
- Robert West – bass
- Arthur Wright – bass
- Earl Palmer – drums
- Clark Eran Gassman, Diana Lee, Gerri Engemann, Jacqueline Mae Ellen, Janice Gassman, Jerry Whitman, Jon Joyce, Lewis E. Moreford, Tom Bahler - choir
