= In Person (Cannonball Adderley album) =

Studio album by Cannonball Adderley
- Released: 1968
- Recorded: September 23 & October 7, 1968
- Studio: Capitol (Hollywood)
- Genre: Jazz
- Label: Capitol
- Producer: David Axelrod

Cannonball Adderley chronology
Why Am I Treated So Bad! (1967)	In Person (1968)	Accent on Africa (1968)

Professional ratings
Review scores
Source	Rating
Allmusic	3/5 stars

In Person is a "live" in-studio album by jazz saxophonist Cannonball Adderley recorded in Hollywood, California in 1968 featuring performances by Adderley with Nat Adderley, Joe Zawinul, Victor Gaskin and Roy McCurdy with guest vocalists Lou Rawls and Nancy Wilson contributing on one song apiece. "The Scavenger" is the product of observation, being written by Zawinul during the previous year's garbage collection strike in New York City. "Sweet Emma" is Nat's tribute to the New Orleans pianist Sweet Emma Barrett.

== Reception ==
The Allmusic review by Scott Yanow awarded the album only 1½ stars but states "It's a loose but fun live session".

== Track listing ==
1. "Rumplestiltskin" (Joe Zawinul) – 11:46
2. "I'd Rather Drink Muddy Water" (Eddie Miller) – 5:02
3. "Save Your Love for Me" (Buddy Johnson) – 4:45
4. "The Scene" (Zawinul, Nat Adderley) – 2:20
5. "Somewhere" (Leonard Bernstein, Stephen Sondheim) – 5:35
6. "The Scavenger" (Zawinul) – 9:54
7. "Sweet Emma" (Nat Adderley) – 5:16
8. "Zorba" (John Kander, Fred Ebb) – 3:32

- Recorded in Hollywood, CA on September 23 (tracks 2–4) & October 7 (tracks 1 & 5–8), 1968

== Personnel ==
- Cannonball Adderley – alto saxophone, soprano saxophone
- Nat Adderley – cornet
- Joe Zawinul – Acoustic and Electric piano
- Victor Gaskin – bass
- Roy McCurdy – drums
- Lou Rawls – vocals (track 2)
- Nancy Wilson – vocals (track 3)
