= The Wrecking Crew (2008 film) =

Documentary film by Denny Tedesco

- 2015 theatrical poster
- Directed by: Denny Tedesco
- Produced by: Denny Tedesco; Chris Hope; Jon Leonoudakis; Mitchell Linden; Claire Scanlon; Damon Tedesco; Suzie Greene Tedesco
- Cinematography: Rodney Taylor; Trish Govoni
- Edited by: Claire Scanlon
- Distributed by: Magnolia Pictures
- Release dates: March 11, 2008 (SXSW Film Festival); March 13, 2015 (United States)
- Running time: 101 minutes
- Country: United States
- Language: English
- Box office: $801,606

The Wrecking Crew is an American documentary film directed by Denny Tedesco, son of guitarist Tommy Tedesco. It covers the story of the Los Angeles–based group of session musicians known as the Wrecking Crew, famed for having played on numerous hit recordings throughout the 1960s and early 1970s. Although the film premiered at the 2008 South by Southwest Film Festival, it did not receive a commercial theatrical release until 2015.

== Synopsis ==
Popular music of the 1960s was dominated by young bands like the Beach Boys, the Mamas & the Papas, Jan and Dean, and the Monkees. Listening to rock and roll on jukeboxes and car radios created devoted fans of these groups, whose music communicated the optimism and sorrow of a generation contending with strong countercultural forces.

Throughout the popularity of these various groups, it was largely hidden from the music listening public that the bands who produced and released the music were, in many cases, not the ones playing many of the instruments in the songs. Instead, that role fell to groups of experienced session musicians such as the titular Wrecking Crew.

The Wrecking Crew documents the work of studio players who recorded the tracks for such hits as "California Dreamin'", "These Boots Are Made for Walkin'", "Be My Baby", "The Beat Goes On", and "Good Vibrations". Interviews with producers, engineers, and session musicians reveal the warmth and humor that allowed their collective talents to turn a simple chord chart into an international phenomenon.

== Cast ==
The film cast included the following musicians and performers, in live appearance and archived footage.

- Lou Adler
- Herb Alpert
- H. B. Barnum
- Chuck Berghofer
- Hal Blaine
- Glen Campbell
- Al Casey
- Cher
- Dick Clark
- Micky Dolenz
- Snuff Garrett
- David Gold
- Bones Howe
- Al Jardine
- Plas Johnson
- Carol Kaye
- Larry Levine
- Gary Lewis
- Lew McCreary
- Roger McGuinn
- Joe Osborn
- Earl Palmer
- Don Peake
- Bill Pitman
- Don Randi
- Stan Ross
- Leon Russell
- Joe Saraceno
- Nancy Sinatra
- Carmie Tedesco
- Tommy Tedesco
- Peter Tork
- Jimmy Webb
- Julius Wechter
- Brian Wilson
- Frank Zappa

== Production ==
Production began in June 1996 and was completed in February 2008. The film played in film festivals in North America, and was the closing film at the Nashville Film Festival on April 24, 2008. A Kickstarter campaign at the end of 2013 raised over three hundred thousand dollars to cover music licensing and final production costs. The film opened in theaters across the United States on March 13, 2015.

== Reception and legacy ==
The Wrecking Crew has received positive reviews from critics. Film review aggregator Rotten Tomatoes reports that 94% of critics gave the film a positive review, based on 71 reviews with a rating and an average score of 7.13/10. The site's consensus states: "The Wrecking Crew may not achieve the greatness of the many classic songs its subjects helped bring to life, but it remains a heartfelt, overdue tribute to overshadowed brilliance."

Kenneth Turan of the Los Angeles Times wrote, "If the history of rock music means anything to you, you know the individuals in question could only be the Wrecking Crew, a legendary group of Los Angeles-based studio musicians, and though their story has taken decades to reach the screen, it has been worth the wait." Mark Feeney of The Boston Globe commented, "Think of The Wrecking Crew as 20 Feet from Stardom (2013) for instrumentalists, or a West Coast version of Standing in the Shadows of Motown (2002). There's a similar shared joy among the participants, a similar sense of discovery for the viewer, and, of course, a killer soundtrack." Christy Lemire of RogerEbert.com gave the film a score of two-and-a-half out of four stars, calling it "brisk and entertaining but also scattered and repetitive," and noted, "It'll make you listen to 'Good Vibrations,' a song you've heard a million times, with fresh ears." The Guardian's Henry Barnes gave the film three out of five stars, concluding, "The editing is muddled and the structure has gone for a walk, but Tedesco nails the point: that the beauty of pop music lies not with the prancing pop starlets, but in the hands of the average-looking, insanely talented artists behind the scenes."

In 2025, the film was selected for preservation in the United States National Film Registry by the Library of Congress as being "culturally, historically, or aesthetically significant."

== Accolades ==
- Seattle International Film Festival: Audience Award for Best Documentary (2008)
- International Documentary Association: Nomination for Alan Ett Music Documentary Award (2008)
- The Rome International Film Festival: Best American Documentary and Audience Award (2008)
- Anchorage International Film Festival: Audience Award (2008)
- Barbados International Film Festival: Best Documentary (2008)
- Savannah Film Festival: Standing Ovation Award (2008)
- Tallgrass Film Festival: Audience Award (2008)
- Idaho International Film Festival: Winner Best Documentary (2008)
- Buffalo Niagara Film Festival: Winner Audience Award (2008)
- Nashville Film Festival: Honorable Mention Impact of Music Award (2008)
- Rhode Island International Film Festival: First Place Documentary (2008)
- Connecticut Film Festival: Audience Award (2010)
- National Film Registry: Inducted (2025)
