= William Blake in popular culture =

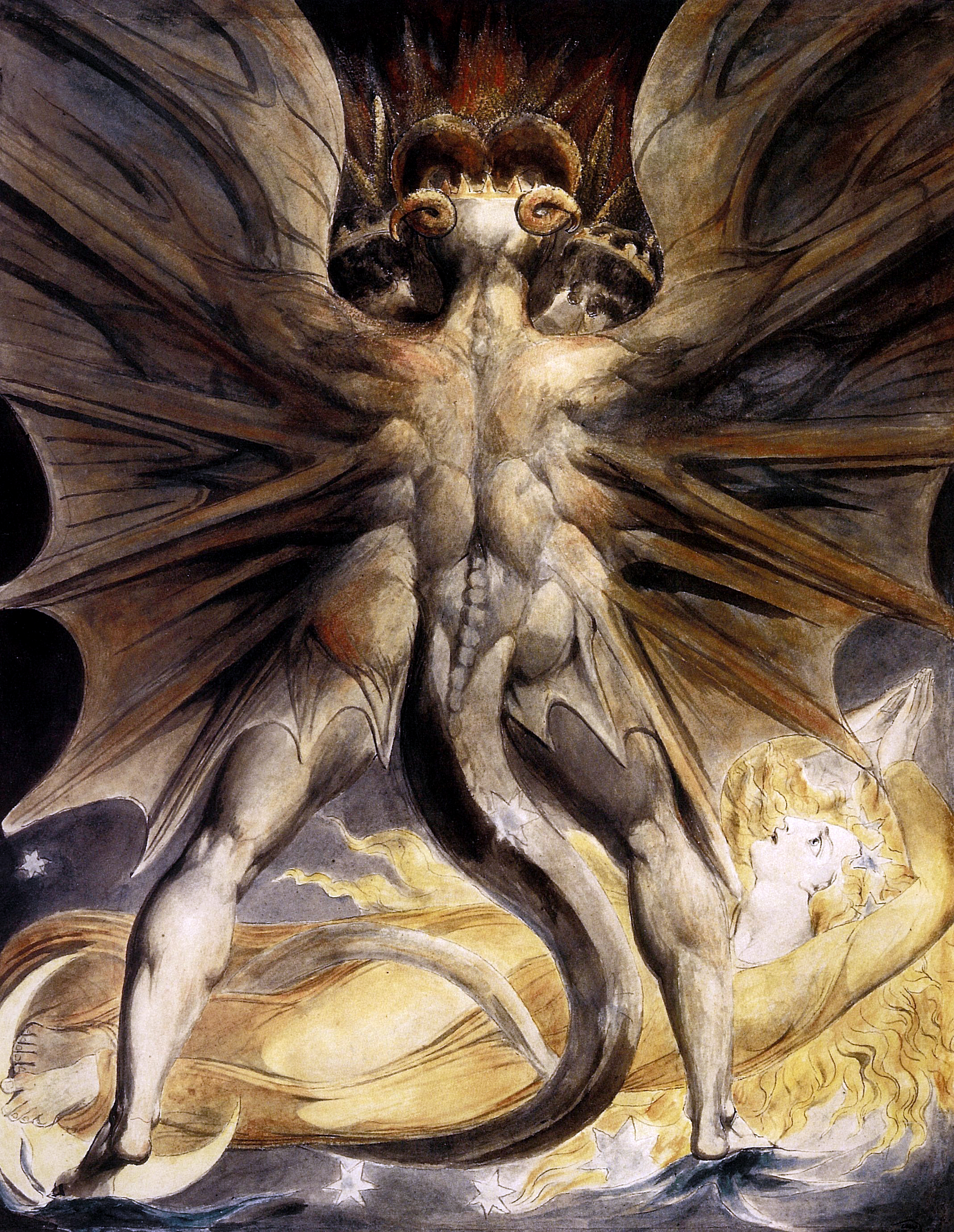
The Great Red Dragon and the Woman Clothed in Sun, 1806–1809

William Blake's body of work has influenced countless writers, poets and painters, and his legacy is often apparent in modern popular culture. His artistic endeavours, which included songwriting in addition to writing, etching and painting, often espoused a sexual and imaginative freedom that has made him a uniquely influential figure, especially since the 1960s. After Shakespeare, far more than any other canonical writer, his songs have been set and adapted by popular musicians including U2, Jah Wobble, Tangerine Dream, Bruce Dickinson and Ulver. Folk musicians, such as M. Ward, have adapted or incorporated portions of his work in their music, and figures such as Bob Dylan, Alasdair Gray and Allen Ginsberg have been influenced by him. The genre of the graphic novel traces its origins to Blake's etched songs and Prophetic Books, as does the genre of fantasy art.

== Literature ==
Several characters from the book series World of Tiers by american writer Philip José Farmer (1966) are named and partly inspired by the work of William Blake. This mythology is referred to by the characters in the stories (mainly in The Gates of Creation, Red Orc's Rage, and More than Fire).

Blake's epic Milton a Poem was adapted by J. G. Ballard in his 1979 novel, The Unlimited Dream Company.

Blake's painting The Great Red Dragon and the Woman Clothed in Sun (1806–1809) and the poem "Auguries of Innocence" both play a prominent role in Thomas Harris' novel Red Dragon (1981), in which the killer Francis Dolarhyde has an obsession with the painting. Dolarhyde imagines himself 'becoming' a being like the Red Dragon featured in the paintings. In Hannibal, a copy of Blake's painting The Ancient of Days is owned by Mason Verger, a reference to Verger's Urizenic qualities.

Salman Rushdie's novel The Satanic Verses (1988) contains a brief episode in which the characters discuss Blake's Marriage of Heaven and Hell.

Blake is described by Philip Pullman as one of three major literary influences on His Dark Materials, along with Heinrich von Kleist and John Milton. Pullman's stated intention was to invert Milton's story of a war between heaven and hell in the light of Blake's famous comment that Milton was "of the Devil's party without knowing it". Pullman stated that he "is of the Devil's party and does know it."

Blake is a character in Tracy Chevalier's novel Burning Bright (2007), which centres on a family who live next door to him in Lambeth while he is writing Songs of Experience.

In Orson Scott Card's series The Tales of Alvin Maker, William Blake was depicted under the name "Taleswapper".

In Crawford Kilian's novel The Fall of the Republic, when a gateway is found to a parallel world equivalent to 18th-century Earth, it is named Beulah, and other worlds at different points in the timestream are named for other Blake entities, such as Orc, Ahania, Los, Urthona, Thel, and Tharmas. In particular, a future world whose atmosphere has been devastated by unknown forces is called Ulro.

Science Fiction writer Ray Nelson's 1975 novel "Blake's Progress" is based on the assumption that Blake was a time-traveler, possessing the ability to travel to the past or future, and that many of Blake's "visions" – sometimes conceived as indications of his "madness" – were actual, concrete things he had seen in these past and future times that he visited.

The 2017 Robert Langdon series' best selling mystery-thriller novel Origin, written by American author Dan Brown, incorporates text from the Blake poem Vala, or The Four Zoas as a prominent plot point of the story.

George Albert Brown's novel, Who Killed Jerusalem?, subtitled, A Rollicking Literary Murder Mystery Based on William Blake's Characters & Ideas Updated to 1970s San Francisco, involves a highly intelligent philistine investigating the death of the city's golden-boy poet laureate (based on William Blake). During his outrageous encounters with the members of the dead poet's coterie (updated amalgams of characters from Blake's work), the investigator soon realizes that to find out what happened, he must not only collect his usual detective's clues but also, despite his own poetically challenged outlook, get into the poet's mind.

== Visual arts ==
Blake was particularly influential on the young generation of early twentieth-century English landscape painters, such as Paul Nash and Carrington. Abstract painter Ronnie Landfield dedicated a painting to Blake in the late 1960s. Canadian artist Marcel Dzama also cites Blake's disturbing creatures as an inspiration for his paintings.

== Comics and graphic novels ==
Blake is often cited as an inspiration in comic literature. Alan Moore cites Blake's work in V for Vendetta (1982–1985) and Watchmen (1986–87). As an apparent homage to Blake's importance in Moore's work, a framed copy of Blake's watercolor Elohim Creating Adam can be seen when Evey first explores V's hideout in the film version of V for Vendetta. William Blake also becomes an important figure in Moore's later work, and is a featured character in From Hell (1991–1998) and Angel Passage (2001). In From Hell, Blake appears as a mystical and occultic foil to William Gull's aristocratic plot to murder the prostitutes of Whitechapel in London. Gull appears to Blake in two visions over the course of Moore's comic, and becomes the inspiration for The Ghost of a Flea. Angel Passage was performed at the 2001 Tate Gallery exhibition of Blake accompanied with art by John Coulthart.

Grant Morrison, R. Crumb, and J. M. DeMatteis have all cited Blake as one of their major inspirations. Comic designer William Blake Everett claims to be descended from Blake.

== Films ==
Francis Dolarhyde as portrayed by Tom Noonan in the film Manhunter, wearing a tattoo based on one of Blake's Red Dragon paintings

In his film Mean Streets (1973), Martin Scorsese refers to Blake's poem "The Tyger" when a young pet tiger makes Harvey Keitel and Robert De Niro take refuge atop a couch, paralleling the grit and innocence of life in the city.

A variation on a verse from Blake's America a Prophecy appears in Ridley Scott's science fiction film Blade Runner (1982), spoken by Roy Batty (Rutger Hauer). This has been interpreted as a way of linking Batty to Blake's mythic regenerative hero Orc.

In Jim Jarmusch's 1995 western Dead Man, the central character, played by Johnny Depp, is named William Blake and allusions to Blake's poetry appear thematically as well as explicitly. An American Indian called Nobody saves Blake's life, and actually thinks that the person is, in fact, Blake the poet.

Blake or his work has also featured in other American independent films since 2000. Hal Hartley's The New Math(s) (2000), in which two students fight with their teacher over the solution to a complex mathematical equation, takes as its inspiration Blake's The Book of Thel. Similarly, Gus Van Sant's Last Days (2005), which is loosely based on the final hours of Kurt Cobain, has a central character called Blake. The Blakean allusions are subtle throughout the film and include Hildegard Westerkamp's "Doors of Perception" soundscape, itself a response to The Marriage of Heaven and Hell. At the end of the film, having committed suicide, Blake's soul ascends from his body in a scene that directly references the illustrations to Robert Blair's The Grave, which was illustrated by Blake in 1808.

The film versions of the novel Red Dragon, Manhunter (1986) and Red Dragon (2002), include images of Blake's The Great Red Dragon and the Woman Clothed in Sun. In the first film the character played by Tom Noonan sports a tattoo on his chest based on Blake's image of the dragon hovering over the woman. The second film has the character (played by Ralph Fiennes) display a stylised version of the dragon tattooed on his back.

The film The Dangerous Lives of Altar Boys (2002) features Blake's works prominently. Tim Sullivan (Kieran Culkin) argues with Sister Assumpta (Jodie Foster) regarding The Marriage of Heaven and Hell, which Assumpta destroys and says that Blake was a "very dangerous thinker." Later in the film, Francis Doyle (Emile Hirsch) reads Blake's The Tyger at Sullivan's funeral as a eulogy.

The image of V escaping the fire at Larkhill in The Wachowskis' V for Vendetta (2006) is very similar to Blake's images of Orc from the Illuminated Works (cf. Urizen plate 16; America plate 12), and an almost exact reproduction of plate 5 (V, had Blake used Roman numerals to number his plates) of "The Gates of Paradise," titled "Fire."

== Television ==
Jack Shepherd's stage play In Lambeth dramatised a visit by Thomas Paine to the Lambeth Home of William and Catherine Blake in 1789. The play was later adapted for television in the BBC Two Encounters series, first broadcast on 4 July 1993.

William Blake and his work feature prominently in The Frankenstein Chronicles.

The first six seasons of The Mentalist feature the antagonist Red John who runs the Blake Association, with its members using the phrase "Tyger Tyger" to signal their membership.

== Music ==
=== Classical ===
Blake's poems have been set to music by many composers, including Ralph Vaughan Williams and Benjamin Britten. In the early twentieth century British classical songwriters regularly set his work for voice or choir. The most famous musical setting is Hubert Parry's hymn Jerusalem, which was written as a patriotic song during World War I. Dorothy Strutt used Blake's text for her song "A Flower was Offered Me." Eva Ruth Spalding also set Blake's text to music, as did Marlyce Polk Reed, Winifred Rees and Dagmar de Corval Rybner.

Contemporary classical composers have also continued to set Blake's work. Composer William Bolcom set the entire collection of the Songs of Innocence and of Experience in 1984, a recording of which was released in 2006. John Mitchell has also set songs from the Poetical Sketches as "Seven Songs from William Blake". Eve Beglarian has written a piece called "The Marriage of Heaven and Hell" inspired by and using quotations from Blake's work of the same name. The Belgian composer Lucien Posman set 55 poems of Blake to music under which all the 'Songs of Innocence & of Experience', 'The Book of Los', 'The Book of Thel', 'The Mental Traveller' etc.. Raymond Wilding-White's Twelve Songs for Soprano and Piano includes settings of four Blake poems: The Sick Rose, The Little Boy Lost, Soft Snow, and The Wild Flower's Song.

=== Popular ===
With the emergence of modern popular music in the 1950s and 1960s, Blake became a hero of the counter culture. Dylan's songs were compared to Blake. Dylan also collaborated with Allen Ginsberg to record two Blake songs. Ginsberg himself performed and recorded many Blake songs, claiming that the spirit of Blake had communicated musical settings of several Blake poems to him. He believed that in 1948 in an apartment in Harlem, he had had an auditory hallucination of Blake reading his poems "Ah, Sunflower," "The Sick Rose," and "Little Girl Lost" (later referred to as his "Blake vision"). Ginsberg created an album of Blake's works, released in 1970 as Songs of Innocence and Experience.

In 1968, Capitol Records producer and composer David Axelrod recorded his first album, Song of Innocence, featuring instrumental interpretations of the titular poetry collection. The recording was done in a contemporary musical vein that fused sounds from pop, jazz, rock, and theater music, leading one critic at the time to coin the term "jazz fusion" and numerous hip hop producers to sample the album's music decades later.

The Fugs set several of Blake's songs and performed a "Homage to William and Catherine Blake," celebrating their sexual freedom.

The cover of The Chemical Wedding by Bruce Dickinson, depicting Blake's painting The Ghost of a Flea.

Loreena McKennitt used lines from the Poetical Sketches in her song Lullaby. Martha Redbone's 2012 album The Garden of Love – Songs of William Blake consists of twelve pieces of Blake's poetry.

In 1983, Mark Stewart of The Pop Group recorded a version of Jerusalem with various On-U label associates under the name 'Mark Stewart & The Maffia', on the Jerusalem (EP), which makes heavy and repeated use of treated samples of Hubert Parry's setting of the song.

In 1987 Tangerine Dream released the album Tyger (album) which centers around Blake's poetry. Three of the tracks have lyrics taken from the poems The Tyger, London and Smile. The track London also incorporates lines from A Little Girl Lost, America: a Prophecy and The Fly.

Enrique Bunbury from Spanish band Héroes del Silencio was influenced by Blake's work, with songs like "El Camino del Exceso (The Road of Excess)," "Los Placeres de la Pobreza (The Pleasures of Poverty)," "Deshacer el Mundo (Unmake the World)" and "La Chispa Adecuada (The Right Spark)".

Coil performed a song called "Love's Secret Domain" that quotes Blake's "The Sick Rose", they also allude to Blake in "The Dreamer is Still Asleep" on Musick to Play in the Dark Vol. 1. Thee Majesty, a later project of Genesis P-Orridge, performed a song called "Thee Little Black Boy" loosely based on Blake's poem "The Little Black Boy".

American swing band the Cherry Poppin' Daddies reference both "The Lamb" and "The Tyger" in a line from "Huffin' Muggles", a track from their 2013 album White Teeth, Black Thoughts.

The Irish rock band U2 released a pair of albums, Songs of Innocence (2014) and Songs of Experience (2017), the titles of which make reference to Blake's collection Songs of Innocence and Experience (1794).

Frank Turner has a song called "I Believed You, William Blake", which is a biography of William Blake as told by his wife, Catherine Blake, on the 2019 album No Man's Land.

In Peter Gabriel's 2023 album I/O, the song "Live and Let Live" contains the lines "And it's William Blake who inks his sting, Drawing out Martin Luther King, Tutu and Madiba, Saying rainbows do exist, The voice of the elders coming through the mist." §

The French band simply called {Blake} claims to be the only band in the world to have set the entire Songs of Innocence and of Experience to music. After two decades of work, the band releases one album a year. They will complete their anthology in 2027, for the bicentenary of the poet's death.

== Games ==
Assets for the game Dante's Inferno draw upon Blake's illustrations to Dante as well as those by Gustave Doré and Auguste Rodin.

The character V from Devil May Cry 5 often quotes poetry by William Blake, namely the opening stanza of Auguries of Innocence being read out loud by the character, and references to The Tyger seen within his poetry book. The game's primary antagonist Urizen, a godlike being embodying absolute power divorced from all conscience and humanity, is inspired by Blake's mythological "Urizen". The plot contains elements which parallel much of Blake's philosophy and writings, most explicitly seen in the half-human, half-demon protagonist, Dante, and his struggle to maintain a balanced wholeness of persona despite his intrinsically dualistic nature, similar to Blake's "Marriage of Heaven and Hell", et al.

In the setting of Warhammer 40,000, Blake and his work is mentioned in-universe as Cornelius Blake. In the Horus Heresy, Blake is mentioned by a number of characters, notably by Fulgrim. The primarch Lorgar Aurelian is also given the honorific name of the Urizen.
