= There's a Whole Lalo Schifrin Goin' On =

Studio album by Lalo Schifrin
- Released: 1968
- Recorded: March 18, 19 & 20, 1968; Los Angeles
- Genre: Jazz
- Length: 28:19
- Label: Dot; DLP 25852
- Producer: Tom Mack

Lalo Schifrin chronology
| The Fox (1968) | There's a Whole Lalo Schifrin Goin' On (1968) | More Mission: Impossible (1968) |

There's a Whole Lalo Schifrin Goin' On is an album by Argentine composer, pianist and conductor Lalo Schifrin recorded in 1968 and released on the Dot label.

The title was devised by Gary Owens.

== Reception ==
Allmusic called the album "ahead of its time in terms of instrumentation, but (...) a product of its time in that established ways of doing things were being challenged", and noted that listeners whose prior experience of Schifrin's work was limited to the Mission Impossible theme would "be drawn in further by the eccentric genius displayed here".

Professional ratings
Review scores
| Source | Rating |
|---|---|
| Allmusic | 4/5 stars |

== Track listing ==
All compositions by Lalo Schifrin

1. "Secret Code Synthesizer" - 2:27
2. "Dissolving" - 2:30
3. "Machinations" - 2:40
4. "Bride of the Wind" - 2:30
5. "Life Insurance" - 2:06
6. "How to Open at Will the Most Beautiful Window" - 2:58
7. "Vaccinated Mushrooms" - 2:40
8. "Two Petals, a Flower and a Young Girl" - 2:09
9. "Wheat Germ Landscapes" - 2:26
10. "Gentle Earthquake" - 3:29
11. "Hawks vs. Doves" - 2:24
- Recorded in Los Angeles, California on March 18, 19 & 20, 1968

== Personnel ==
- Lalo Schifrin - piano, synthesizer, arranger, conductor
- Tony Terran, John Audino - trumpet
- Lloyd Ulyate, Barrett O'Hara - trombone
- John Johnson - tuba
- Vincent DeRosa - horn
- Bud Shank, Ronnie Lang, Sam Most - reeds
- Arnold Kobentz - oboe, English horn
- Ralph Grierson, Artie Kane, Roger Kellaway, Mike Lang - keyboards
- Paul Beaver - keyboards, synthesizer, stereo harp
- Carl Fortina - accordion
- Howard Roberts, Dennis Budimir, Bill Pitman, Louis Morell - guitar
- James Bond, Ray Brown - bass
- Carol Kaye, Max Bennett - electric bass
- Shelly Manne - drums, percussion
- Earl Palmer, Ken Watson, Joe Porcaro, Emil Richards - percussion
- Milt Holland - tabla
- Bonnie Douglas, Sam Freed, Anatol Kaminsky, Nathan Kaproff, George Kast, Marvin Limonick, Erno Neufeld, Paul Shure - violin
- Myra Kestenbaum, Allan Harshman, Robert Ostrowsky, Virginia Majewski - viola
- Raphael Kramer, Edgar Lustgarten, Eleanor Slatkin - cello
- Catherine Gotthoffer - harp
- Robert Helfer - orchestra manager
