= Seriously Deep =

Studio album by David Axelrod
- Released: 1975
- Recorded: 1975
- Genres: Jazz-funk, jazz fusion
- Length: 39:31
- Label: Polydor
- Producers: Jimmy Bowen, Cannonball Adderley

Seriously Deep is a studio abum by American composer David Axelrod. Released in 1975 by Polydor Records, the album represents a shift in style from his signature orchestral arrangements to an electric jazz-funk sound.

== Original liner notes ==
Only a week after this album was finished, David and I sat down and played a dub of “Seriously Deep” for a college student. She was a young girl who was certainly not aware of his work (or the success of it) in the past few years. After nearly 40 minutes of intense listening, the album ended, and, as if language were no longer permitted, everything became very quiet. David finally said, “Well?” The girl looked across the coffee table, “It’s a pleasure to know you.”

Quite a few people have shared the sentiment of that college student. Musicians who have known David’s work and have taken great pleasure in hearing no compromises . . . in having respect for a musician who has respect for his music. On this album, you’ll hear ideas you’ve never heard before, including a tribute to an equally uncompromising filmmaker, Ken Russell. Like his work, David’s music is too important to make changes – and that’s why, on this liner, you’ll find a list of some of the industry’s finest musicians who have played on this album only because they know David Axelrod. They, the college student and myself agree, “It’s a pleasure to know you.”

--Jack Schnyder

== Reissue summary ==
From Dusty Groove:

One of the rarest albums ever from funky maestro David Axelrod -- the producer known for his work with the Electric Prunes on Reprise, and a string of late 60s classics on Capitol Records! This mid 70s set for Polydor has Axelrod working in a jazz funk mode -- much more electric than before, with heavy keyboards from Crusader Joe Sample, thundering drums from Ndugu Chancler, reeds from Jerome Richardson and Ernie Watts, vibes from Gary Coleman, and a nice undercurrent of strings as well. There's a subtle dose of fusion in the mix, but one that's never too jamming -- and Axelrod always maintains his trademark sense of space and timing -- turning the simplest musical measure into the kind of groove that holds up well into the 21st Century. The album's a favorite of sample hounds and crate diggers, and is incredibly hard to find on vinyl.

== Track listing ==
- All tracks composed, arranged, & conducted by David Axelrod

No.	Title	Length
1.	"Miles Away"	8:22
2.	"One"	5:35
3.	"1000 Rads"	8:10
4.	"Ken Russell"	6:38
5.	"Go For It"	3:53
6.	"Reverie"	6:53

== Personnel ==
- Joe Sample – Arp Synthesizer, Clavinet, & Fender Rhodes
- Jerome Richardson – soprano & tenor saxophone
- Ernie Watts – flute, oboe, & tenor saxophone
- Jay Migliori – baritone saxophone & flute
- Gene Cipriano – tenor saxophone & flute
- Gary Coleman – vibes
- Billy Fender – guitars
- John Morrell – guitars
- Allen DeRienzo – trumpet
- Snooky Young – trumpet
- Jimmy Cleveland – trombone
- Dick "Slyde" Hyde – trombone
- Jim Hughart – bass
- Leon "Ndugu" Chancler – drums
- Mailto Correa – percussion
- Jack Shulman – strings (concertmaster)

Solos

- Jerome Richardson – soprano saxophone on "Miles Away"
- Nathan Gershman – cello on "1000 Rads"
- Billy Fender – guitar on "1000 Rads"
- Ernie Watts – tenor saxophone "1000 Rads", flute on "Ken Russell", alto flute on "Reverie"

Technical personnel

- Engineered by Maurice Leach
- Produced by Jimmy Bowen & Cannonball Adderley
