= Accent on Africa =

Studio album by Cannonball Adderley
- Released: October 1968
- Recorded: June 13–14, 1968
- Genre: Jazz
- Label: Capitol
- Producer: David Axelrod

Cannonball Adderley chronology
In Person (1968)	Accent on Africa (1968)	Country Preacher (1969)

Professional ratings
Review scores
Source	Rating
Allmusic	3.5/5 stars
DownBeat	4/5 stars

Accent on Africa is an album by jazz saxophonist Cannonball Adderley recorded in 1968 for the Capitol label featuring performances by Adderley with Nat Adderley and unidentified percussion section, vocalists, and big band.

== Reception ==
The Allmusic review by Richard S. Ginell awarded the album 3½ stars and states "this is one of the best and most overlooked of the Cannonball Adderley Capitols, a rumbling session that bursts with the joy of working in an unfamiliar yet vital rhythmic context".

== Track listing ==
All compositions by Julian "Cannonball" Adderley except as indicated

1. "Ndolima" (Joe Zawinul) – 3:48
2. "Hamba Nami" – 3:32
3. "Khutsana" – 3:58
4. "Up and At It" (Wes Montgomery) – 3:36
5. "Gumba" – 5:25
6. "Marabi" – 2:50
7. "Gun-Jah" – 4:16
8. "Lemadima" – 3:38
  - Recorded in San Francisco, CA on September 23 (tracks 2–4) & October 7 (tracks 1 & 5–8), 1968

== Personnel ==
- Cannonball Adderley – alto saxophone (3, 4, 6), soprano saxophone (1, 3, 7, 8), varitone (2, 5)
- Nat Adderley – cornet
- H.B. Barnum – arranger, conductor
- Unidentified brass, reeds and vocals
- Unknown – piano, harpsichord
- Carol Kaye – guitar
- Ray Brown – bass
- Earl Palmer - drums
- Unknown – percussion
