= Music from Mission: Impossible =

Soundtrack album by Lalo Schifrin
- Released: 1967
- Recorded: October 4, 5 & 7, 1967
- Genre: Jazz
- Length: 29:44
- Labels: Dot; DLP 25831
- Producer: Tom Mack

Lalo Schifrin chronology
The Rise and Fall of the Third Reich (1967)	Music from Mission: Impossible (1967)	Cool Hand Luke (1967)

Singles from Music from Mission: Impossible
- 1. "Theme from Mission: Impossible"

Music from Mission: Impossible is an album featuring music composed and conducted by Lalo Schifrin recorded in 1967 and released on the Dot label. The music on this album is re-recorded and extended scores were originally commissioned for the TV series Mission: Impossible.

== Reception ==
Schifrin was awarded two Grammys at the 10th Grammy Awards for his work on the first series (Best Instrumental Theme and Best Original Score for a Motion Picture or TV Show).

The album peaked at 47 on the Billboard Albums Chart and 11 on the magazine's jazz chart in 1968.

The Allmusic review states: "Any fan of the show should try and find this album at a used music shop, but more specifically fans of Lalo Schifrin (and that could be quite a few, as he remained uncredited on some of his TV themes) should definitely check the album out. It's a good buy if you can find it".

Professional ratings
Review scores
Source	Rating
Allmusic	3/5 stars

== Track listing ==
All compositions by Lalo Schifrin except as indicated

1. "Mission: Impossible" - 2:31
2. "Jim on the Move" - 3:12
3. "Operation Charm" - 2:55
4. "The Sniper" - 3:20
5. "Rollin Hand" - 2:48
6. "The Plot" - 2:25
7. "Wide Willy" - 2:03
8. "Cinnamon (The Lady Was Made to Be Loved)" (Jack Urbont, Bruce Geller) - 2:36
9. "Barney Does It All" - 2:30
10. "Danger" - 2:44
11. "Mission: Accomplished" - 2:40
- Recorded in Hollywood, California on October 4, 5 & 7, 1967

== Personnel ==
- Lalo Schifrin - piano, harpsichord, arranger, conductor
- Al Porcino, John Audino, Tony Terran, Ray Triscari, Stuart Williamson - trumpet
- Billy Byers - trombone, arranger
- Dick Nash, George Roberts, Dick Leith, Lloyd Ulyate - trombone
- Vincent DeRosa, Bill Hinshaw, David Duke, Richard Mackey - French horn
- Bud Shank, Ronald Langinger, Justin Gordon, John Lowe, Jack Nimitz - reeds
- Mike Melvoin - piano, harpsichord
- Paul Beaver - piano
- Bob Bain, Tommy Tedesco - guitar
- Bill Plummer - sitar
- Ray Brown - bass
- Carol Kaye - electric bass
- Earl Palmer - drums, percussion
- Shelly Manne - drums
- Adolfo Valdes - bongos, conga
- Ken Watson, Emil Richards - percussion
- Anatol Kaminsky, Paul Shure, Bonnie Douglas, Sam Freed, Marvin Limonick, Alexander Murray, Irma Neumann, George Kast, Nathan Kaproff, Thelma Beach, James Getzoff, George Berres, Ambrose Russo, Joe Stepansky, Irma Neumann - violin
- Allan Harshman, Myra Kestenbaum, Milton Thomas, Myer Bello - viola
- Raphael Kramer, Eleanor Slatkin, Frederick Seykora, Justin DiTullio, Emmet Sargeant - cello
- Dorothy Remsen - harp
- Robert Helfer - orchestra manager
- George Del Barrio, Dick Hazard - arranger
