= David Axelrod (musician) =

American musician, record producer, composer and arranger (1931–2017)

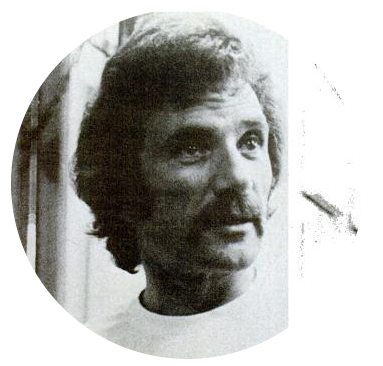
- Axelrod c. 1972

Background information
- Born: April 17, 1931; Los Angeles, California, US
- Died: February 5, 2017 (aged 85) Burbank, California, US
- Genres: Baroque pop; Psychedelic rock; jazz-funk; psychedelia; fusion
- Occupations: Producer, arranger, composer
- Labels: Capitol/EMI Records; Fantasy Records
- Website: www.davidaxelrodmusic.com

David Axelrod (April 17, 1931 (Note: Although some sources give his year of birth as 1933, or 1936, official records and his family state that he was born in 1931.) – February 5, 2017) was an American composer, arranger, and producer. After starting out as a staff producer for record companies specializing in jazz, Axelrod became known by the mid-1960s in soul and jazz circles for his recording skills. In 1968, Axelrod embarked on a solo career and released several albums during the 1970s that showcased his characteristic sound, which combined heavily microphoned drums and baroque orchestration, and avant garde themes ranging from the environment to heightened mental awareness.

With his early solo projects, Axelrod was one of the first recording artists to fuse elements of jazz, rock, and R&B. One of his most important records, Song of Innocence (1968), featured instrumental interpretations of 18th-century poet William Blake's poetry collection of the same name done in a contemporary musical vein, leading one critic at the time to coin the term "jazz fusion" and numerous hip hop producers to sample the album's music decades later.

== Early life ==
Born in Los Angeles, California, David Axelrod — known to his friends as "Axe" — was raised in its South Central neighborhood, where he grew up listening to R&B and jazz. He graduated from Dorsey High School. His father, who was active in radical labour union politics, died when he was 12.

== Career ==
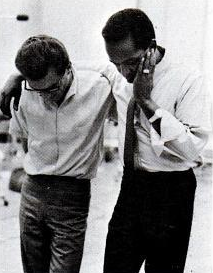
David Axelrod with Lou Rawls c. 1966

After a stint as a boxer, Axelrod joined the Marines. Returning to Los Angeles, he found studio work in the film and television industry, and was soon in demand as a drummer, producer and arranger. He produced his first album in 1959, saxophonist Harold Land’s The Fox.

In late 1963, Axelrod joined Capitol Records as a producer and A&R man. He encouraged the label to develop their black musicians. He began working with Lou Rawls, producing his successful Live album and a succession of gold albums and hit singles including "Love Is a Hurtin' Thing", "Your Good Thing (Is About to End)" and "Dead End Street", which Axelrod wrote and produced. He also began working with Julian "Cannonball" Adderley, one of the most successful jazz crossover artists of the 1960s. Axelrod produced Adderley's 1967 album Mercy, Mercy, Mercy! Live at 'The Club', which spawned the jazz hit "Mercy, Mercy, Mercy”, written by the band's pianist Joe Zawinul, which reached No. 11 in the US pop charts. Axelrod also produced four successful albums for heartthrob actor David McCallum, who could not sing. “I think they were buying the autographed pictures that we put in the albums,” said Axelrod later.

Around this time Axelrod also began working with a regular group of leading session musicians, including Howard Roberts (guitar), Carol Kaye (bass) and Earl Palmer (drums). In 1968, Axelrod wrote Mass in F Minor and Release of an Oath in a contemporary rock vein for the Electric Prunes; they were released under the band's name, but because of their complexity were recorded by other musicians. The Electric Prunes disbanded during the recording sessions and Axelrod's team completed the albums. Axelrod's success also encouraged Capitol to allow him to produce solo albums, the first two of which, Song of Innocence (1968) and Songs of Experience (1969), were homages to the mystical poetry and paintings of William Blake. These used sweeping strings, booming sound and heavy beats in a way that was unique for the time and became highly influential many years later. As Axelrod himself said, "They called it fusion — I don't think it was. I was thinking more of Gunther Schuller, John Lewis ... the Third Stream mixture of classical music and jazz. I took what I loved and used R&B rhythms to tie it together. That's what it really is." His third solo album, Earth Rot (1970), warned of the impact of environmental pollution and degradation.

At the same time, Axelrod continued to work with Adderley and Rawls, and with the South African singer Letta Mbulu, bandleader David Rose, and unsuccessful psychedelic groups The Common People and Hard Water. He also co-wrote, with his son Michael Axelrod, a 1970 album, Pride. In 1970, he left Capitol and over the next few years issued a rock version of Handel's oratorio Messiah and further solo albums, as well as continuing to work with Adderley on several albums until the latter's death in 1975. His approach fell out of fashion for a while, and three solo albums he recorded in the 1980s went unreleased. Between 1974 and 1978 Axelrod was a frequent collaborator with Sam Pottle, writing songs for the television show Sesame Street, including the Emmy Award-winning special Christmas Eve on Sesame Street (1978).

His work as arranger and composer began to be rediscovered in the early 1990s, and to be sampled by artists such as Dr. Dre, DJ Shadow and Lauryn Hill. In 1993, he released his first album for over a decade, Requiem: Holocaust. Several compilations of his earlier work were also released. In 2000 he released David Axelrod, which used rhythm tracks originally recorded for a proposed third Electric Prunes album, with new arrangements. Dr. Dre used a David McCallum cut ("The Edge") for "The Next Episode" from 1999's 2001. Masta Ace also used a cut from "The Edge" in his song, "No Regrets" from the 2001 album, Disposable Arts. In addition, "The Edge" was heavily sampled on the Emperor Penguin track "Burnt Sienna and Avocado".

Axelrod appeared at the Royal Festival Hall, London, on 17 March 2004 as part of the Ether festival where he conducted a performance of his solo work. He was joined onstage by Richard Ashcroft who sang "Holy Are You", originally recorded by The Electric Prunes. During the intro of his song "The Edge", he spoke on the subject of sampling, saying "I'm such a hypocrite, I hate sampling because it takes jobs away from musicians, but it allows me to have fun. It's screw-you money. So I love this, naturally. Thank you Dre.". At the end of this rare concert he informed the audience that he was suffering from ill health. Axelrod signed with Blue Note Records in 2005. In 2006, Live at Royal Festival Hall was released as a DVD and CD.

== Personal life ==
Axelrod was a heroin addict for 10 years, then a cocaine addict for 17 years. He was married four times, and had four children, one of whom died of a heroin overdose in 1970. According to Axelrod's obituary in The Times, "Axelrod was devastated, but the tragedy failed to cure him of his own cocaine addiction, and he did not stop using the drug until a near-death experience in 1981 in which his pulse shot up to 266 beats per minute. 'I never wanted to quit it. It quit me,' he complained. 'I liked it, and it never got in the way of anything.' Axelrod's fourth wife, Terri, suffered a traumatic brain injury in a car accident in the 1980s. The two were briefly homeless in the 1990s, before Axelrod's fortunes revived as a result of the sampling of his earlier work.

Axelrod died of lung cancer on February 5, 2017, at the age of 85. He was survived by his wife of 38 years, Terri; and by three children, Michael, Dana, and Brian.

== Discography ==
=== Albums ===
List of albums, with selected details
Title	Details
Song of Innocence	Released: 1968; Label: Capitol; Formats: CD, LP
Songs of Experience	Released: 1969; Label: Capitol; Formats: CD, LP
Earth Rot	Released: 1970; Label: Capitol; Formats: CD, LP
Rock Messiah	Released: 1971; Label: RCA; Formats: LP
The Auction	Released: 1972; Label: Decca; Formats: LP
Heavy Axe	Released: 1974; Label: Fantasy; Formats: LP, CD
Seriously Deep	Released: 1975; Label: Polydor; Formats: LP, CD
Strange Ladies	Released: 1977; Label: MCA; Formats: LP
Marchin'	Released: 1980; Label: MCA; Formats: LP
Requiem: The Holocaust	Released: 1993; Label: Stateside; Formats: CD
The Big Country	Released: 1995; Label: Stateside; Formats: CD
David Axelrod	Released: 2001; Label: Mo' Wax; Formats: CD
David Axelrod Live at Royal Festival Hall	Released: 2004; Label: Formats: CD/DVD

=== Compilation ===
- The Edge: David Axelrod At Capitol Records 1966-1970 (Capitol Jazz, 2005)

=== Singles ===
- "Gumshoe" / "The Lost Lament" (Decca, 1972)
- "The Leading Citizen" (Decca, 1972)
- "The Dr & The Diamond" (Mo' Wax, 2001)
- "Holy Thursday" (Stateside, 2002) (split)
- "The Signs" (Capitol Jazz, 2005) (split)
- "London" (Stateside, 2006)

== Other credits ==
=== As arranger ===
With Hampton Hawes

- Northern Windows (Prestige, 1974) - also producer

With The Electric Prunes

- Mass in F Minor (Reprise, 1968)
- Release of an Oath (Reprise, 1968)

With Gene Ammons

- Brasswind (Prestige, 1974)

=== As producer ===
With Cannonball Adderley

- Cannonball Adderley Live! (Capitol, 1964)
- Live Session! (Capitol, 1964))
- Cannonball Adderley's Fiddler on the Roof (Capitol, 1964)
- Domination (Capitol, 1965)
- Mercy, Mercy, Mercy! Live at 'The Club' (Capitol, 1966)
- 74 Miles Away (Capitol, 1967)
- Why Am I Treated So Bad! (Capitol, 1967)
- In Person (Capitol, 1968)
- Accent on Africa (Capitol, 1968)
- Country Preacher (Capitol, 1969)
- The Cannonball Adderley Quintet & Orchestra (Capitol, 1970)
- Love, Sex, and the Zodiac (Capitol, 1970)
- The Price You Got to Pay to Be Free (Capitol, 1970)
- The Happy People (Capitol, 1972)
- The Black Messiah (Capitol, 1972)
- Music You All (Capitol, 1976)
- Inside Straight (Capitol, 1973)
- Pyramid (Capitol, 1974)
- Walk Tall: The David Axelrod Years (Stateside, 2006)[2CD] – compilation

With Donna Loren

- Beach Blanket Bingo (Capitol T-2323, ST-2323, 1965)
- "Blowing Out the Candles" b/w "Just a Little Girl" (Capitol 5250, 1964)
- "Ten Good Reasons" b/w "Ninety Day Guarantee" (Capitol 5337, 1964)
- "New Love" b/w "So, Do the Zonk" (Capitol 5409, 1965)
- These Are the Good Times: The Complete Capitol Recordings (Now Sounds CRNOW-47, 2014) (tracks: "Just a Little Girl", "So, Do the Zonk", "Good Things" [previously unreleased], "Leave Him to Me" [previously unreleased], "Ten Good Reasons", "Ninety Day Guarantee", "Blowing Out the Candles", "Drop the Drip" [previously unreleased], and the tracks from the Beach Blanket Bingo album).

With David McCallum

- Music...A Part of Me (Capitol ST 2432, 1966)
- Music...A Bit More of Me (Capitol ST 2498, 1966)
- Music...It's Happening Now! (Capitol ST 2651, 1967)
- McCallum (Capitol ST 2748, 1968)

With others

- Elmo Hope, Elmo Hope Trio (HiFi Jazz, 1960)
- Harold Land, The Fox (HiFi Jazz, 1960)
- Frank Rosolino, Free for All (Speciality, 1986)
- Jimmy Witherspoon, Feelin' The Spirit (HiFi Jazz, 1959)
