= Earl Palmer =

American drummer (1924–2008)

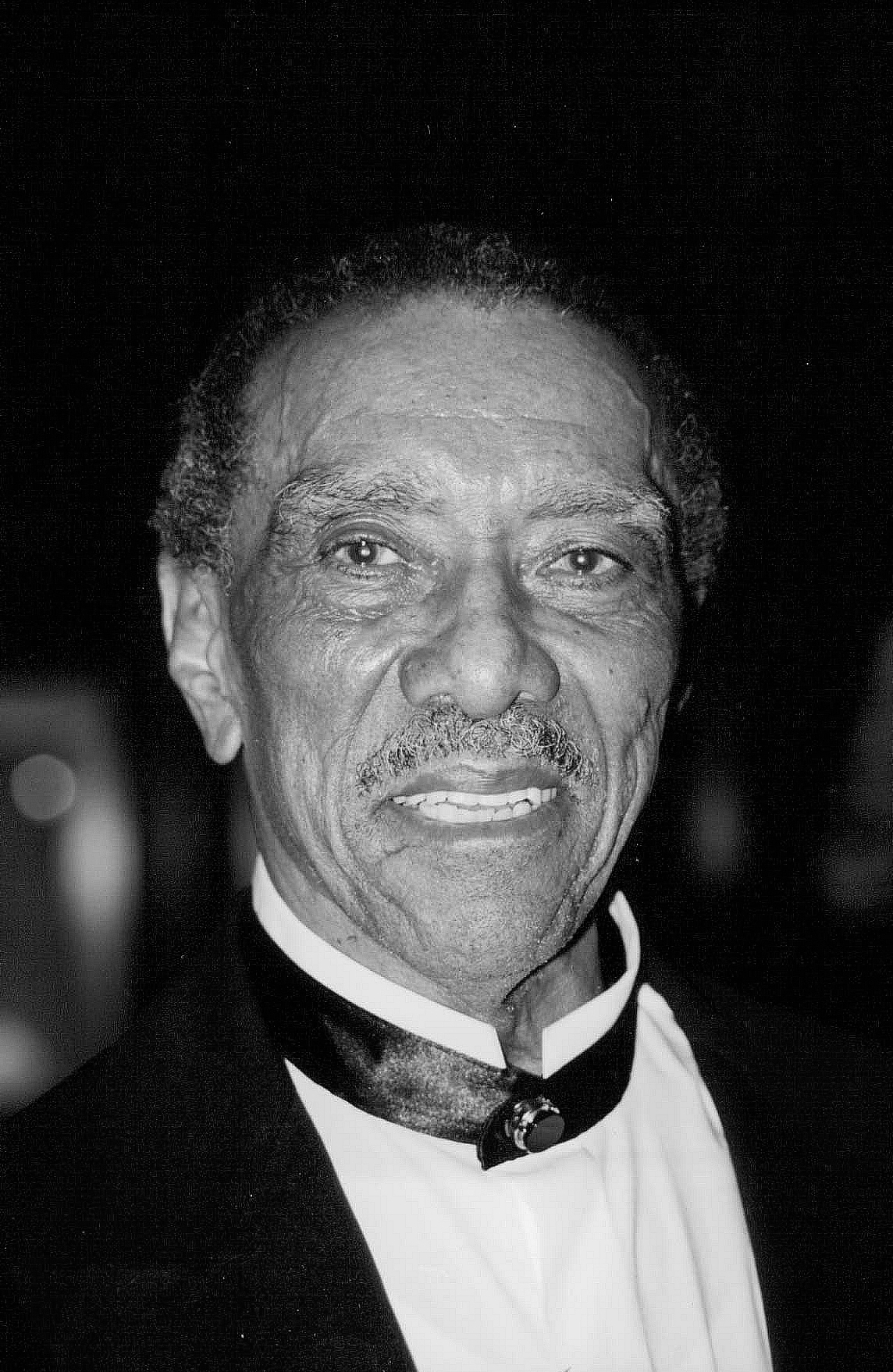
- Palmer in 2000

Background information
- Born: Earl Cyril Palmer; October 25, 1924; New Orleans, Louisiana, U.S.
- Died: September 19, 2008 (aged 83) Banning, California, U.S.
- Genres: R&B, rock, jazz
- Occupation: Session musician
- Instrument: Drums
- Formerly of: The Wrecking Crew

Earl Cyril Palmer (October 25, 1924 – September 19, 2008) was an American drummer. Considered one of the inventors of rock and roll, he is a member of the Rock and Roll Hall of Fame.

Palmer was one of the most prolific studio musicians of all time and played on thousands of recordings, including nearly all of Little Richard's hits, many of Fats Domino's hits, "You've Lost That Lovin' Feelin'" by the Righteous Brothers, and a long list of classic TV and film soundtracks. According to one obituary, "his list of credits read like a Who's Who of American popular music of the last 60 years".

== Biography ==
Born into a show-business family in New Orleans and raised in the Tremé district, Palmer started his career at five as a tap dancer, joining his mother and aunt on the black vaudeville circuit in its twilight and touring the country extensively with Ida Cox's Darktown Scandals Review. His father is thought to have been the local pianist and bandleader Walter "Fats" Pichon. Palmer was raised Catholic.

Palmer was 12 when he headlined a floor show at the Rhythm Club in New Orleans, "a very beautiful spot where one can enjoy a floor show, headed by Alvin Howey and Little Earl Palmer".

Palmer served in the United States Army during World War II and was posted in the European theatre. His biographer wrote,

Most Negro recruits were assigned to noncombatant service troops: work gangs in uniform. "They didn't want no niggers carrying guns," says Earl; they carried shovels and garbage cans instead. Earl's job, loading and handling ammunition, was relatively technical, but his duty was clear: to serve white infantrymen.

— Tony Scherman, Backbeat: Earl Palmer's Story (1999), p. 47

After the war ended Palmer studied piano and percussion at the Grunewald School of Music in New Orleans, where he also learned to read music. He started drumming with the Dave Bartholomew Band in the late 1940s. Palmer was known for playing on New Orleans recording sessions, including Fats Domino's "The Fat Man" and "I'm Walkin" (and several more of Domino's hits), "Tipitina" by Professor Longhair, "Tutti Frutti" by Little Richard (and most of Richard's hits), "Lawdy Miss Clawdy" by Lloyd Price, and "I Hear You Knocking'" by Smiley Lewis.

His playing on "The Fat Man" featured the backbeat that has come to be the most important element in rock and roll. Palmer said, "That song required a strong afterbeat throughout the whole piece. With Dixieland you had a strong afterbeat only after you got to the shout last chorus…It was sort of a new approach to rhythm music." Reportedly, he was the first to use the word funky, to explain to other musicians that their music should be made more syncopated and danceable.

Palmer left New Orleans for Hollywood in 1957, initially working for Aladdin Records. He soon started working with the Wrecking Crew, a loose-knit group of session musicians who recorded nonstop during their heyday from 1962 to 1968.

The musicians union tracked Palmer playing on 450 dates in 1967 alone.

For more than 30 years he played drums on the soundtracks of many movies and television shows. Amongst the many artists he worked with were Glenn Yarbrough, Frank Sinatra, Phil Spector, Ricky Nelson, Bobby Vee, Ray Charles, Dinah Washington, Sam Cooke, Eddie Cochran, Ritchie Valens, Bobby Day, Don and Dewey, Jan and Dean, The Beach Boys, Larry Williams, Gene McDaniels, Bobby Darin, Neil Young, The Pets, The Byrds when they were still known as The Beefeaters, and B. Bumble and the Stingers. He also played in jazz sessions with David Axelrod, Dizzy Gillespie, Earl Bostic, Onzy Matthews, and Count Basie, and he contributed to blues recordings by B.B. King.

He remained in demand as a drummer throughout the 1970s and 1980s, playing on recordings for albums by Randy Newman, Tom Waits, Bonnie Raitt, Tim Buckley, Little Feat and Elvis Costello.

In 1982, Palmer was elected treasurer of the Local 47 of the American Federation of Musicians. He served until he was defeated in 1984. He was re-elected in 1990.

A biography, Backbeat: Earl Palmer's Story, by Tony Scherman, was published in 1999.

In later years, Palmer played with a jazz trio in Los Angeles.

Palmer is interviewed on screen and appears in performance footage in the 2005 documentary film Make It Funky!, which presents a history of New Orleans music and its influence on rhythm and blues, rock and roll, funk and jazz. In the film, he performs "Rip It Up" with guest vocalist Ivan Neville and house band.

Palmer is also interviewed in the 2008 documentary film about Los Angeles session musicians, The Wrecking Crew.

Palmer died in September 2008, in Banning, California, after a long illness. He is buried at Riverside National Cemetery in Riverside, California.

=== Personal life ===
Palmer married four times and had seven children. At the time of his death, he was survived by his children Earl Cyril Palmer Jr., Donald Alfred Palmer, Ronald Raymond Palmer and Patricia Ann Palmer from his marriage to Catherine Palmer; Shelly Margaret Palmer and Pamela Teresa Palmer from his marriage to Susan Joy Weidenpesch; and Penny Yasuko Palmer from his marriage to Yumiko Makino. He married his fourth wife, Jeline, in 2004.

== Quotations ==
- "You could always tell a New Orleans drummer the minute you heard him play his bass drum because he'd have that parade beat connotation".
- Late in his career, Palmer appeared in a music video with the band Cracker on the song "I Hate My Generation". As Addicted to Noise tells the story, "According to Cracker leader David Lowery, when Palmer was asked if he would be able to play along with the songs, he gave Lowery a look and said, 'I invented this shit.'"
- "I've been asked if people could borrow my drums because they like their sound. What the hell, they think the drums play themselves? I said, 'You really want 'em? Really? Okay. Cost you triple scale and cartage.'"
- When asked by Max Weinberg what more of the recording sessions he had played on Palmer replied, "Don't ask me which ones I played on. I should have done like Hal [Blaine]. Hal used to get gold records for all the things he played on. I never did that, you know. I would like to have a room with all those things in them. It would have been nice—show my grandchildren when they grow up so they don't say, 'Oh shut up old man and sit down.' I could just say, 'Look. I don't have to tell you nothing. There it is.'"

== Awards ==
In 2000, Palmer became one of the first session musicians to be inducted into the Rock and Roll Hall of Fame.

== Discography ==
=== As leader ===
- Drumsville (Liberty, 1961)
- Percolator Twist and Other Twist Hits (Liberty, 1962)

=== As sideman ===
With David Axelrod

- Song of Innocence (Capitol, 1968)
- Songs of Experience (Capitol, 1969)
- Earth Rot (Capitol, 1970)
- Strange Ladies (MCA, 1977)
- Marchin' (MCA, 1980)
- David Axelrod (Mo' Wax, 2001)

With The Beach Boys

- The Beach Boys Today! (Capitol, 1965)
- Sunflower (Reprise, 1970)
- L.A. (Light Album) (CBS, 1979)

With Glen Campbell

- The Astounding 12-String Guitar of Glen Campbell (Capitol, 1964)
- Hey Little One (Capitol, 1968)
- The Glen Campbell Goodtime Album (Capitol, 1970)

With Ray Charles

- Together Again (ABC, 1965)
- Crying Time (ABC, 1966)
- Ray Charles Invites You to Listen (ABC, 1967)

With Sam Cooke

- Twistin' the Night Away (RCA Victor, 1962)
- Mr. Soul (RCA Victor, 1963)
- Ain't That Good News (RCA Victor, 1964)

With Bobby Darin

- Bobby Darin Sings Ray Charles (Atco, 1962)
- Venice Blue (Capitol, 1965)
- Bobby Darin Sings The Shadow of Your Smile (Atlantic, 1966)

With Fats Domino

- This Is Fats Domino! (Imperial, 1956)
- Fats Domino Rock and Rollin' (Imperial, 1956)
- Here Stands Fats Domino (WaxTime, 1957)
- Fats Is Back (Reprise, 1968)

With José Feliciano

- Feliciano/10 to 23 (RCA Victor, 1969)
- That The Spirit Needs (Of Muse And Man) (RCA Victor, 1971)

With Bobbie Gentry

- Ode to Billie Joe (Capitol, 1967)
- The Delta Sweete (Capitol, 1968)

With Lightnin' Hopkins

- Lightnin' Strikes (Verve Folkways, 1966)
- Something Blue (Verve Forecast, 1967)

With B. B. King

- Blues in My Heart (Crown, 1962)
- L.A. Midnight (ABC, 1972)
- Let the Good Times Roll (MCA, 1999)

With Peggy Lee

- Blues Cross Country (Capitol, 1962)
- Make It With You (Capitol, 1970)
- Norma Deloris Egstrom from Jamestown, North Dakota (Capitol, 1972)

With Ketty Lester

- Love Letters (Era, 1963)
- Ketty Lester (Records By Pete, 1969)

With Harvey Mandel

- Righteous (Phillips, 1969)
- The Snake (Janus, 1972)

With Teena Marie

- Wild and Peaceful (Motown, 1979)
- Irons in the Fire (Gordy, 1980)

With The Monkees

- The Birds, the Bees & the Monkees (Colgems, 1968)
- The Monkees Present (Colgems, 1969)

With Maria Muldaur

- Waitress in a Donut Shop (Reprise, 1974)
- Sweet Harmony (Reprise, 1976)

With Lou Rawls

- Tobacco Road (Capitol, 1964)
- Too Much! (Capitol, 1967)

With Della Reese

- "i like it like dat!" (ABC, 1965)
- Della on Strings of Blue (ABC, 1967)
- I Gotta Be Me...This Trip Out (ABC, 1968)
- Let Me in Your Life (People, 1973)

With Little Richard

- Here's Little Richard (Speciality, 1957)
- Little Richard (Speciality, 1958)
- The Fabulous Little Richard (Speciality, 1959)
- The Second Coming (Reprise, 1972)

With Howard Roberts

- Color Him Funky (Capitol, 1963)
- H.R. is a Dirty Guitar Player (Capitol, 1963)

With Lalo Schifrin

- Music from Mission: Impossible (Dot, 1967)
- There's a Whole Lalo Schifrin Goin' On (Dot, 1968)
- Ins and Outs (Palo Alto, 1982)

With Frank Sinatra

- Sinatra and Swingin' Brass (Reprise, 1962)
- Ol' Blue Eyes Is Back (Reprise, 1973)

With others

- Arthur Adams, Home Brew (Fantasy, 1975)
- Cannonball Adderley, Accent on Africa (Capitol, 1968)
- J. W. Alexander, Raw Turntips & Hot Sauce (Thrush, 1970)
- Lisa Hartman Black, Lisa Hartman (Kirshner, 1976)
- Pat Boone, Great! Great! Great! (Dot, 1961)
- Teresa Brewer, Music, Music, Music (Amsterdam, 1973)
- Charles Brown, Drifting Blues (Score, 1957)
- Tim Buckley, Look at the Fool (Discreet, 1974)
- Johnny Burnette, Roses Are Red (Liberty, 1962)
- Keith Carradine, I'm Easy (Asylum, 1976)
- Roy Clark, Stringing Along with the Blues (Capitol, 1966)
- David Clayton-Thomas, David Clayton-Thomas (Columbia, 1972)
- Climax, Climax Featuring Sonny Geraci (Rocky Road, 1972)
- Buddy Collette's Swinging Shepherds, At the Cinema! (Mercury, 1959)
- Priscilla Coolidge, Gypsy Queen (Sussex, 1970)
- Elvis Costello, King of America (F-Beat, 1986)
- Dick Dale, Mr. Eliminator (Capitol, 1964)
- Bobby Day, Rockin' With Robbin (Class, 1959)
- Neil Diamond, Tap Root Manuscript (Uni, 1970)
- The 5th Dimension, Living Together, Growing Together (Bell, 1973)
- Willie Dixon, Hidden Charms (Capitol, 1988)
- Deke Dickerson, In 3-Dimensions (Major Label, 2003)
- Donovan, 7-Tease (Epic, 1974)
- Duane Eddy, Twistin' And Twangin' (RCA Victor, 1962)
- Harry Edison, Sweets for the Sweet Taste of Love (Vee-Jay, 1964)
- The Electric Prunes, Release of an Oath (Reprise Records, 1968)
- Phil Everly, Star Spangled Springer (RCA, 1973)
- The Everly Brothers, Roots (Warner Bros., 1968)
- Gil Fuller, Gil Fuller & the Monterey Jazz Festival Orchestra featuring Dizzy Gillespie (Pacific Jazz, 1965)
- Gale Garnett, Gale Garnett Sings About Flying and Rainbows and Love and Other Groovy Things (RCA Victor, 1967)
- Lowell George, Lightning-Rod Man (Bizarre, 1993)
- Lorne Greene, Lorne Greene's American West (RCA Victor, 1965)
- Hager Twins, Motherhood, Appie Pie and the Flag (Capitol, 1971)
- Tim Hardin, Tim Hardin 1 (Verve, 1966)
- Al Hirt & Lalo Schifrin, Latin in the Horn (RCA Victor, 1966)
- Milt Jackson, Memphis Jackson (Impulse!, 1969)
- Jan and Dean, Surf City and Other Swingin' Cities (Liberty, 1963)
- Jan and Dean, Drag City (Liberty, 1963)
- Dr. John, N'Awlinz: Dis Dat or d'Udda (Blue Note, 2004)
- Plas Johnson, This Must Be the Plas (Capitol, 1959)
- Gloria Jones, Share My Love (Motown, 1973)
- Eddie Kendricks, The Hit Man (Tamla, 1975)
- Sarah Kernochan, Beat Around the Bush (RCA, 1974)
- Clydie King, Brown Sugar featuring Clydie King (Chelsea, 1973)
- Al Kooper, Easy Does It (Columbia, 1970)
- Little Feat, Down on the Farm (Warner Bros., 1979)
- Julie London, Julie...At Home (Liberty, 1960)
- Jon Lucien, Romantico (Zemajo, 1980)
- Taj Mahal, The Natch'l Blues (Columbia, 1968)
- The Mamas & the Papas, People Like Us (Dunhill, 1971)
- Barry Mann, Survivor (RCA Victor, 1975)
- Letta Mbulu, Free Soul (Capitol Records, 1968)
- Michael Martin Murphey, Swans Against the Sun (Epic, 1975)
- Michael Nesmith, The Wichita Train Whistle Sings (Dot, 1968)
- Randy Newman, Sail Away (Reprise, 1972)
- Wayne Newton, Pour Me a Little More Wine (Chelsea, 1973)
- Harry Nilsson, The Point (RCA Victor, 1971)
- Van Dyke Parks, Song Cycle (Warner Bros., 1967)
- Billy Preston, Greazee Soul (Soul City, 1963)
- Bonnie Raitt, Takin' My Time (Warner Bros., 1973)
- The Righteous Brothers, Back to Back (Philles, 1965)
- Leon Russell, Looking Back (Olympic, 1973)
- Sonny & Cher, Look at Us (Atco, 1965)
- Splinter, Harder to Live (Dark Horse, 1975)
- Barbra Streisand, Stoney End (Columbia, 1971)
- The Strollers, Swinging Flute in Hi-Fi (Score, 1958)
- The Sugar Shoppe, The Sugar Shoppe (Now Sounds, 1968)
- Gene Summers, The Ultimate School of Rock & Roll (Crystal Clear Sound, 1997)
- Jim Sullivan, U.F.O. (Monnie, 1969)
- Big Joe Turner, Life Ain't Easy (Pablo, 1983)
- Ike & Tina Turner, River Deep – Mountain High (London, 1966)
- Sarah Vaughan, A Time in My Life (Mainstream, 1971)
- Eddie "Cleanhead" Vinson, The Original Cleanhead (BluesTime, 1970)
- Tom Waits, Blue Valentine (Asylum, 1978)
- Joe Williams, With Love (Temponic, 1972)
- Paul Williams, Someday Man (Reprise, 1970)
- Neil Young, Neil Young (Reprise, 1969)

==== Singles ====
- "The Fat Man" – Fats Domino (1949)
- "Messy Bessy" – Dave Bartholomew (1949)
- "Lawdy Miss Clawdy" – Lloyd Price (1952)
- "I'm Gone" – Shirley and Lee (1952)
- "Doin' the Hambone" b/w "Thinkin' 'Bout My Baby" – James Booker (1954)
- "In the Night" – Professor Longhair (1954)
- "I Hear You Knockin" – Smiley Lewis (1955)
- "Blue Monday" – Fats Domino (1955)
- "The Girl Can't Help It", "Rip It Up", "Long Tall Sally", "Slippin' and Slidin'", "Ready Teddy" – Little Richard (1956)
- "Chicken Shack Boogie" – Amos Milburn (1956)
- "Ooh-Wee-Baby" – Art Neville (1956)
- "Let the Good Times Roll" – Shirley and Lee (1956)
- "Red Hot" – Bob Luman (1957)
- "You Send Me" – Sam Cooke (1957)
- "I'm Walkin'" – Fats Domino (1957)
- "I'm Leaving It Up to You" – Don and Dewey (1957)
- "Little Bitty Pretty One" – Bobby Day and Thurston Harris (1957)
- "Busy, Busy", "My Heaven" – Dan Bowden (1958)
- "Donna" – Ritchie Valens (1958)
- "Summertime Blues" – Eddie Cochran (1958)
- "Slow Down", "Dizzy Miss Lizzy", "Bony Moronie" – Larry Williams (1958)
- "Polly Molly", "Forever and a Day" – 5 Masks (1958)
- "Patricia Darling", "Whatta You Do" – Ray Willis (1958)
- "Nervous", "Gotta Lotta That", "Twixteen", "Crazy Cat Corner" – Gene Summers (1958)
- "Rockin' Robin" – Bobby Day (1958)
- "Willie and the Hand Jive" – Johnny Otis (1958)
- "La Bamba" – Ritchie Valens (1959)
- "Hippy Hippy Shake" – Chan Romero (1959)
- "Made In The Shade" – Jimmy & Alton (1959)
- "Walking to New Orleans" – Fats Domino (1960)
- "Percolator Twist" – Billy Joe And The Checkmates (1961)
- "The Lonely Bull" – Herb Alpert (1962)
- "High Flyin' Bird" – Judy Henske (1963)
- "Please Let Me Love You" – The Beefeaters (who later became the Byrds) (1964)
- "The Little Old Lady from Pasadena", "Dead Man's Curve" – Jan and Dean (1964)
- "You've Lost That Lovin' Feelin'" – The Righteous Brothers (1964)
- "Please Let Me Wonder" – The Beach Boys (1965)
- "Hold Me, Thrill Me, Kiss Me" – Mel Carter (1965)
- "River Deep - Mountain High" – Ike & Tina Turner (1966)
- "I'll Be Back Up On My Feet", "We Were Made for Each Other", "Magnolia Simms" – The Monkees (1968)
- "The Old Laughing Lady", "I've Loved Her So Long" – Neil Young (1969)
- "She Gets Me Where I Live", "God Sheds His Grace on Thee" – Al Kooper (1970)
- "It's About Time" - The Beach Boys (1970)
- "Whistlin' Past the Graveyard", "Sweet Little Bullet From a Pretty Blue Gun" – Tom Waits (1978)

=== Film scores ===
Palmer was the session drummer for a number of film scores, including:

1961

Judgment at Nuremberg, score by Ernest Gold

1963

Hud, score by Elmer Bernstein
It's a Mad, Mad, Mad, Mad World, score by Ernest Gold

1964

Baby the Rain Must Fall, score by Elmer Bernstein
Ride the Wild Surf, score by Stu Phillips
Robin and the Seven Hoods, score by Nelson Riddle

1965

Boeing Boeing, score by Neal Hefti
Harlow, score by Neal Hefti
How to Stuff a Wild Bikini, score by Les Baxter
A Patch of Blue, score by Jerry Goldsmith

1967

Pretty Polly, score by Michel Legrand
Cool Hand Luke, score by Lalo Schifrin
In the Heat of the Night, score by Quincy Jones

1968

A Dandy in Aspic, score by Quincy Jones

1990

The Hot Spot, score by Jack Nitzsche, with John Lee Hooker, Miles Davis

=== Television scores ===
Palmer was also the session drummer for a number of television show themes and soundtracks, including:

- The Flintstones
- M Squad
- 77 Sunset Strip
- Bourbon Street Beat
- Hawaiian Eye
- Peyton Place
- I Dream of Jeannie
- The Man from U.N.C.L.E.
- Green Acres
- Ironside
- The Outsider
- It Takes a Thief
- The Leslie Uggams Show
- The Brady Bunch
- Delta
- The Partridge Family
- The Odd Couple
- The Pearl Bailey Show
- M*A*S*H
- The Midnight Special
- Mannix
- Mission: Impossible

== 1952 ==
Artist	Song title	Highest position on US charts	Miscellaneous
Lloyd Price	"Lawdy Miss Clawdy"		

== 1955 ==
Artist	Song title	Highest position on US charts	Miscellaneous
Smiley Lewis	"I Hear You Knocking"		
Fats Domino	"Blue Monday"		
Shirley and Lee	"Feel So Good"		
Little Richard	"Kansas City/Hey-Hey-Hey-Hey"		Later covered by The Beatles

== 1956 ==
Artist	Song title	Highest position on US charts	Miscellaneous
Little Richard	"Tutti Frutti"	#17	
Fats Domino	"I'm in Love Again"	#3	
Fats Domino	"My Blue Heaven"	#19	
Fats Domino	"When My Dreamboat Comes Home"	#14	
Little Richard	"Long Tall Sally"	#6	
Little Richard	"Slippin' and Slidin'"	#33	
Little Richard	"Rip It Up"	#17	
Amos Milburn	"Chicken Shack Boogie"		
Shirley and Lee	"Let the Good Times Roll"	#20	

== 1957 ==
Artist	Song title	Highest position on US charts	Miscellaneous	
Fats Domino	"I'm Walkin'"	#4 March 9, 1957		
Roy Brown	"Let the Four Winds Blow"	#29 July 1, 1957		
Sam Cooke	"You Send Me"	#1 October 28, 1957		
Thurston Harris	"Little Bitty Pretty One"	#6 October 28, 1957		
Don and Dewey	"I'm Leaving It Up to You"	July 18, recorded 1957	Became a #1 hit for Dale and Grace in 1963 and a #4 for Donny and Marie Osmond in 1974	
The Hollywood Flames	"Buzz-Buzz-Buzz"	#11 December 2, 1957	Bobby Day, lead singer	
Little Richard	"Lucille"	#21 April 6, 1957		
Little Richard	"Jenny Jenny"	#10 June 24, 1957		
Bob Luman	"Red Hot"			
Ricky Nelson	"I'm Walkin'"	#4 May 6, 1957	Palmer had previously charted with the Fats Domino original version of this song	
Ricky Nelson	"Be-Bop Baby"	#3 October 7, 1957		
Larry Williams	"Slow Down"		Recorded September 11, 1957	Song later recorded by The Beatles
Larry Williams	"Short Fat Fanny"	#5 July 8, 1957		
Larry Williams	"Bony Moronie"	#14 November 11, 1957	Song later covered by John Lennon	
Percy Mayfield	"Please Believe Me"			

== 1958 ==
Artist	Song title	Highest position on US charts	Miscellaneous
Eddie Cochran	"Summertime Blues"	#8 August 25, 1958	
Bobby Day	"The Bluebird, the Buzzard and the Oriole"		
Bobby Day	"Rockin' Robin"	#2 August 4, 1958	
Bobby Day	"Over and Over"	#41	Covered by the Dave Clark Five for a #1 hit
Doris Day	"Everybody Loves a Lover"	#6 August 4, 1958	
Eddie Cochran	"Jeannie Jeannie Jeannie"	#94	
Fats Domino	"I Hear You Knocking"		Previously (1955) recorded with Smiley Lewis
Don and Dewey	"Koko Joe"	Recorded March 27, 1958	Song written by Sonny Bono and released as a single for The Righteous Brothers in 1963
Jan and Arnie	"Jennie Lee"	#8	Jan and Arnie later changed their name to Jan and Dean
Johnny Otis Show	"Willie and the Hand Jive"	#9	
Little Richard	"Good Golly, Miss Molly"	#10	
Art and Dotty Todd	"Chanson D'Amour"	#6	
The Burnette Brothers; Johnny Burnette & Dorsey Burnette	"Warm Love, Boppin' Rosalie"	Recorded February 5, 1958	
Eugene Church	"Pretty Girls Everywhere"		
Ritchie Valens	"Come On, Let's Go"	#42	
Ritchie Valens	"Donna"	#2, 12/15/58	
Ritchie Valens	"La Bamba"	#22, 1/19/59	
Larry Williams	"Dizzy Miss Lizzy"		Later covered by The Beatles
Sheb Wooley	"The Purple People Eater"	#1	Remained #1 for 14 weeks

== 1959 ==
Artist	Song title	Highest position on US charts	Miscellaneous
Edd Byrnes	"Kookie, Kookie (Lend Me Your Comb)"	#4	The female voice on the song is Connie Stevens
Eddie Cochran	"Teenage Heaven"	#99	
Anita Bryant	"Till There Was You"	#30	
Ernie Fields	"In the Mood"	#4	
Don and Dewey	"Farmer John"		
Don and Dewey	"Pink Champagne"		
Jan and Dean	"Baby Talk"	#10	
Chan Romero	"Hippy Hippy Shake"		Later covered many times, notably by The Swinging Blue Jeans
April Stevens	"Teach Me Tiger"		
Don Ralke	"Bourbon Street Beat"		
Connie Stevens	"Sixteen Reasons"	#3	
The Teddy Bears	"Oh Why"		
Larry Williams	"Bad Boy"		Recorded by The Beatles in 1964
Ritchie Valens	"Stay Beside Me"		

== 1960 ==
Artist	Song title	Highest position on US charts	Miscellaneous
Bobby Vee	"Devil or Angel"	#6	
Bobby Vee	"Rubber Ball"	#6	
Bobby Bare	"Book of Love"		
Dante & the Evergreens	"Alley Oop"	#15	
Dinah Washington	"Love Walked In"		
Walter Brennan	"Dutchman's Gold"	#30	
Dorsey Burnette	"Hey Little One"	#48	

== 1961 ==
Artist	Song title	Highest position on US charts	Miscellaneous
B. Bumble and the Stingers	"Bumble Boogie"	#21	A reworking of Nikolai Rimsky-Korsakov's Flight of the Bumblebee
B. Bumble and the Stingers	"Nut Rocker"	#23	A reworking of Tchaikovsky's March of the Toy Soldiers, Nutcracker ballet
Glen Campbell	"Turn Around, Look at Me"	#62	
Timi Yuro	"Hurt"	#4	
Jimmy Witherspoon	"Warm Your Heart"		
The Castelles	"Sacred"		
Bobby Vee	"Run to Him"	#2	
Bobby Vee	"Take Good Care of My Baby"	#1	
Paul Anka	"Dance On Little Girl"	#10	
Sam Cooke	"Cupid"	#17	
Sam Cooke	"Twisting the Night Away"	#9	
Bobby Darin	"You Must Have Been a Beautiful Baby"	#5	
Simms Twins	"Soothe Me"	#5 on the US R&B charts	Written by Sam Cooke
Jackie DeShannon	"Heaven Is Being with You"		
The Fleetwoods	"Tragedy"	#10	
The Fleetwoods	"(He's) The Great Imposter"	#30	
Lou Rawls	"Above My Head"		
The Lettermen	"When I Fall in Love"	#7	
Gene McDaniels	"Chip Chip"	#10	
Gene McDaniels	"A Hundred Pounds of Clay"	#3	
Gene McDaniels	"Tower of Strength"	#5	

== 1962 ==
Artist	Song title	Highest position on US charts	Miscellaneous
Herb Alpert and the Tijuana Brass	"The Lonely Bull"	#6	
Walter Brennan	"Mama Sang a Song"		
Vicki Carr	"He's a Rebel"		#115
Ray Charles	"I Can't Stop Loving You"	#1	
Ray Charles	"You Don't Know Me"	#2	
Nat King Cole	"Ramblin' Rose"	#2	
Johnny Crawford	"Cindy's Birthday"	#8	
Bobby Darin	"You're the Reason I'm Living"	#3	
Duane Eddy	"Ballad of Paladin"	#33	Members of the Western Writers of America chose it as one of the top 100 Western songs of all time (#36).
The Everly Brothers	"Don't Ask Me to Be Friends"	#48	
Ketty Lester	"Love Letters"	#5	
Willie Nelson	"Half a Man"	#25 on the US Country charts	
Clifford Scott	"The Kangaroo/Skee-dattle to Seattle"		
Frank Sinatra	"Everybody's Twistin'"		
Bobby Vee	"The Night Has a Thousand Eyes"	#3	

== 1963 ==
Artist	Song title	Highest position on US charts	Miscellaneous
Roy Clark	"Through the Eyes of a Fool"	#128, #31 on Country chart	
Bobby Darin	"Treat My Baby Good"	#43	
The Everly Brothers	"It's Been Nice (Goodnight)"	#101	
Jan and Dean	"Drag City"	#10	
Jan and Dean	"Surf City"	#1	
