= Rock Messiah =

Studio album by David Axelrod
- Released: November 1, 1971
- Recorded: 1971
- Label: RCA
- Producer: David Axelrod

David Axelrod chronology
| Earth Rot (1970) | Rock Messiah (1971) | The Auction (1972) |

David Axelrod's Rock Interpretation of Handel's Messiah (commonly known as Rock Messiah) is a 1971 album by David Axelrod. It is a rock-based interpretation of George Frideric Handel's oratorio Messiah.

The album features arrangements by Axelrod played by a 38-piece orchestra conducted by Julian "Cannonball" Adderley. Los Angeles Times writer Martin Bernheimer described the album as "relatively straight and square, as much concerned with Handel and jazz and the gospel tradition as it is with blatant rock". Axelrod described his motivation for the album as "making Handel more accessible".

Ebony writer Phyl Garland described the album as "Jesus Christ Superstar on a bad trip", also stating "The whole thing just seems so unnecessary."

It was originally released in 1971 on U.S. RCA label issue nine-track on a standard vinyl LP (RCA LSP-4636). It was reissued on CD in 2012 on the U.S. Real Gone label (RGM-0041).

== Track listing ==
All tracks composed and arranged by David Axelrod

1. "Overture"
2. "Comfort Ye My People...Recitative"
3. "And The Glory Of The Lord...Chorus"
4. "Behold...Recitative"
5. "Pastoral Symphony"
6. "And The Angel Said unto Them...Recitative"
7. "Glory To God...Chorus"
8. "Hallelujah...Chorus"
9. "Worthy Is The Lamb...Chorus"
