= Carol Kaye =

American bass guitarist (born 1935)

- Born: Carol Smith; March 24, 1935 (age 91); Everett, Washington, U.S.
- Genres: Rock; pop; jazz; R&B; soul
- Occupations: Session musician, teacher
- Instruments: Bass guitar, guitar
- Years active: 1949–present
- Website: carolkaye.com

Carol Kaye (née Smith; born March 24, 1935) is an American musician. She is one of the most prolific recorded bass guitarists in rock and pop music, playing on an estimated 10,000 recordings in a career lasting over 65 years.

Kaye began playing guitar in her early teens; after some time as a guitar teacher, she began to perform regularly on the Los Angeles jazz and big band circuit. She started session work in 1957, and through a connection at Gold Star Studios began working for producers Phil Spector and Brian Wilson. After a bassist failed to turn up to a session in 1963, she switched to that instrument, quickly making a name for herself as one of the most in-demand session players of the 1960s, playing on numerous hits. She moved into playing on film soundtracks in the late 1960s, particularly for Quincy Jones and Lalo Schifrin, and began to release a series of tutoring books such as How To Play The Electric Bass. Kaye became less active towards the end of the 1970s, but has continued her career and attracted praise from other musicians.

During the peak of her years of session work, Kaye became part of a stable of Los Angeles–based musicians known as the Wrecking Crew. She appeared in the 2008 documentary The Wrecking Crew. In 2025, Kaye was selected for induction into the Rock and Roll Hall of Fame in the Musical Excellence Award category, but she rejected the honor.

== Early life ==
Kaye was born in Everett, Washington, to professional musicians Clyde and Dot Smith. Her father was a jazz trombonist who played in big bands. In 1942, he sold a piano in order to finance a move to Wilmington, California. She later said her father was violent towards her, and she persuaded her mother to separate from him, but music was the one thing that could unite the family.

At age 13, Kaye received a steel string guitar from her mother. She began playing sessions in jazz clubs around Los Angeles. During the 1950s, Kaye played bebop jazz guitar with several groups on the Los Angeles club circuit, including Bob Neal's group, Jack Sheldon backing Lenny Bruce, Teddy Edwards and Billy Higgins. She played with the Henry Busse Orchestra in the mid-1950s, and toured the US with them.

== Career ==
=== Pop sessions ===
In 1957, Kaye was playing a gig at the Beverly Cavern, Hollywood, when producer Robert "Bumps" Blackwell invited her to a recording session for Sam Cooke's arrangement of "Summertime". She realized she could make significantly more money with session work than playing in jazz clubs, so took it up as a full-time career. In 1958, she played acoustic rhythm guitar on Ritchie Valens' "La Bamba", recorded at Gold Star Studios, Hollywood. Through Gold Star, she began to work with producer Phil Spector, playing electric guitar on Bob B. Soxx & the Blue Jeans' "Zip-a-Dee-Doo-Dah" and the Crystals' "Then He Kissed Me", and acoustic guitar on the Righteous Brothers' "You've Lost That Lovin' Feelin'". Along with several other musicians, including drummer Hal Blaine and guitarist Glen Campbell, her work with Spector attracted the attention of other record producers, and she found herself in demand as a regular session player.

In 1963, when a bass player failed to show for a session at Capitol Records in Hollywood, she was asked to fill in on the instrument. She quickly discovered she preferred playing bass, and found it was a key component of a backing track and allowed her to play more inventively than the relatively simple guitar parts she had been playing until then. From a pragmatic viewpoint, it was easier to carry a single bass to sessions than to swap between three or four guitars depending on the song. After bassist Ray Pohlman left studio work to become a musical director, Kaye became the most in-demand session bassist in Los Angeles.

Kaye continued to play guitar on numerous other hit songs in the 1960s and 1970s, including the twelve-string electric guitar on several Sonny & Cher songs. She also played twelve-string on Frank Zappa's album Freak Out! At the time, it was unusual for women to be experienced session players; nevertheless Kaye remembered sessions being generally good-humored and united by the music.

Kaye was the sole regular female member of the Wrecking Crew (though she has said the collective was never known by this name), a collective of studio musicians who played on a large number of hit records from Los Angeles in the 1960s. Throughout the decade, while at the time unknown to the public, Kaye played bass on a substantial number of records that appeared on the Billboard Hot 100. According to the New York Times, she played on 10,000 recording sessions. She appeared on sessions by Frank Sinatra, Simon & Garfunkel, Stevie Wonder, Barbra Streisand, the Supremes, the Temptations, the Four Tops and the Monkees. She played electric bass on Nancy Sinatra's "These Boots Are Made for Walkin'", while Chuck Berghofer played double bass. She also came up with the introduction on fellow session player Glen Campbell's hit "Wichita Lineman". Kaye later said that during the 1960s, she sometimes played three or four sessions per day, and was pleased that so many of them created hit records.

Through her work with Spector, Kaye caught the attention of the Beach Boys' Brian Wilson; Wilson used her on several sessions, including the albums Beach Boys Today, Summer Days (and Summer Nights!!), Pet Sounds and Smile. Kaye's bass lines have been described as "the driving force" behind "Good Vibrations", a number 1 hit and the band's best-selling single. Unlike other sessions, where she was free to work out her own bass lines, Wilson always came in with a very specific idea of what she should play. By Pet Sounds, Wilson was asking musicians such as Kaye to play far more takes than typical sessions, often running over ten passes of a song, with sessions stretching well into the night.

=== Soundtracks, tutoring, and later work ===
By 1969, Kaye was exhausted and had become disillusioned with session work; she stated that the music had "started to sound like cardboard". At the same time, many newer rock bands disapproved of using session players, preferring to play the instruments themselves. She decided to make a change, so her career evolved from playing primarily pop music to performing mostly soundtrack work, as well as writing and teaching. She wrote How To Play The Electric Bass, the first in a series of tutoring books and instructional video courses. Her soundtrack sessions from this time included playing on the themes to M.A.S.H., The Streets of San Francisco and Across 110th Street. Kaye had already performed on a number of soundtracks and had worked closely with Lalo Schifrin, playing on the theme to Mission: Impossible and the soundtrack for Bullitt. She regularly collaborated with Quincy Jones, later saying that he "wrote some of the most beautiful themes I've ever heard in my life". Kaye was also a part of Jones' orchestra at the 43rd Academy Awards.

In the early 1970s, she toured with Joe Pass and Hampton Hawes, and continued to do sessions. In 1973, she played on Barbra Streisand's single "The Way We Were", which was cut live, and was admonished by producer Marvin Hamlisch for improvising bass lines. In 1976, she was involved in a car accident and semi-retired from music. She continued to play sporadically, appearing on J. J. Cale's 1981 album Shades.

In 1994, Kaye underwent corrective surgery to fix injuries stemming from the accident; she resumed playing and recording. She collaborated with Fender to produce a lighter version of the Precision Bass that reduced strain on her back and made it more comfortable to play. In 1997, she collaborated with Brian Wilson again, playing on his daughters' album, The Wilsons; in 2006, Frank Black asked her to play on his album Fast Man Raider Man alongside fellow session stalwart, drummer Jim Keltner. She was featured in the 2008 film The Wrecking Crew along with a cast of other studio musicians. In one interview segment, she said that she believed that at the peak of her session activity, she was making more money than the US president.

== Style and equipment ==
Kaye's main instrument during the 1960s was the Fender Precision Bass. She also used the Danelectro bass on occasion. During the 1970s, she sometimes used the Gibson Ripper Bass, and in the 21st century, she has used an Ibanez SRX700 bass. She uses Thomastik-Infeld JF344 flatwound strings with a high action and preferred to use guitar amplifiers in the studio when playing bass, including the Fender Super Reverb and the Versatone Pan-O-Flex. Kaye primarily uses a pick, or plectrum, on both guitar and bass, rather than plucking the strings with her fingers. She also typically muted her bass using a piece of felt on top of the strings in front of the bridge, thus reducing unwanted overtones and undertones. Later she said, "For 25 cents, you could get the best sound in town".

Kaye preferred to play melodic and syncopated lines on the bass, rather than simply covering a straightforward part. In the studio, she particularly liked to use the upper register on her bass, while a stand-up double bass would be used to cover the low end.

== Legacy ==
Kaye has achieved critical acclaim as one of the best session bassists of all time. Michael Molenda, writing in Bass Player magazine, said that Kaye could listen to other musicians and instantly work out a memorable bass line that would fit with the song, such as her additions to Sonny & Cher's "The Beat Goes On". Paul McCartney has said that his bass playing on the Beatles' Sgt. Pepper's Lonely Hearts Club Band was inspired by her work on Pet Sounds. Alison Richter, writing in Bass Guitar magazine, has called Kaye the "First Lady" of bass playing, adding "her style and influence are in your musical DNA."

Kaye's solo bass line in Spector's production of "River Deep, Mountain High", was a key part to the song's "Wall of Sound" production. The recording is now in the Grammy Hall of Fame. Quincy Jones said in his 2001 autobiography Q that "... women like ... Fender bass player Carol Kaye ... could do anything and leave men in the dust." Brian Wilson has said that Kaye's playing on the "Good Vibrations" sessions was a key part of the arrangement he wanted. "Carol played bass with a pick that clicked real good. It worked out really well. It gave it a hard sound." Dr. John has said that Kaye "is a sweetheart as well as a kick-ass bass player".

Despite being admired as one of the studio greats, Kaye never expected to be well-remembered. At the time of the sessions, most of the players thought pop music would not last longer than ten years, and she is surprised that people still listen to tracks on which she played. Although the Amazon hit series The Marvelous Mrs. Maisel paid homage to Kaye and her career with the character of Carole Keen, introduced in season three and played by Liza Weil, Kaye described the character as "having nothing to do with me or my history. They took a few things out of my book and created a character that's not even me at all." In 2020, Rolling Stone magazine ranked Kaye number five in its list of the 50 greatest bassists of all time.

Kaye was selected for induction into the Rock and Roll Hall of Fame in the musical excellence category, but refused the honor and said she would not attend the ceremony.

== Personal life ==
Kaye was raised a Baptist. She converted to Judaism in the early 1960s, and had a Bat Mitzvah ceremony. She has been married three times and has two living children.

At age 13, Kaye took guitar lessons from Horace Hatchett (1909–1985), an esteemed instructor and graduate of the Eastman School of Music who eventually set her up with gigs playing bebop in L.A. nightclubs. At age 16, Kaye gave birth to their child.

Two years later, she married musician Al Kaye, and they had one son together. However, Al Kaye, 22 years her senior, had a drinking problem, and they would divorce soon after. Kaye's second husband did not approve of her job's late hours, and he did not like it when she was playing with musicians. They had one daughter together. Kaye divorced him, got a live-in nanny, and went back to work. Kaye's third husband was jazz drummer and session musician Spider Webb. They cofounded a jazz/funk group Spiders Webb, which went on to record the album I Don't Know What's on Your Mind, for Fantasy Records in 1976. Their marriage was brief, and Kaye recalled thinking she was no good with men. Instead, she planned to stay single for the rest of her life, relying only on music, which had never disappointed her.

== Publications ==
- Studio Musician. Carol Kaye LLC. 2016. ISBN 978-0-9858748-3-4. OCLC 1015248853 – via Internet Archive.
