= The Japanese Concerts =

Compilation album by Cannonball Adderley
- Released: 1975
- Recorded: July 9, 14 & 15 1963
- Genre: Jazz
- Label: Milestone

Cannonball Adderley chronology
Cannonball's Bossa Nova (1962)	The Japanese Concerts (1975)	Cannonball Adderley Live! (1963)

The Japanese Concerts is a live album by jazz saxophonist Cannonball Adderley recorded at the Kōsei Nenkin Kaikan and Sankei Hall in Tokyo during his 1963 Japanese tour and featuring performances by Adderley with Nat Adderley, Yusef Lateef, Joe Zawinul, Sam Jones and Louis Hayes. The album was released on the Milestone label in 1975 and combines material previously released on Adderley's Nippon Soul (1963) with an additional disc of unreleased performances from a concert recorded a week earlier.

== Reception ==
The Allmusic review by Scott Yanow awarded the album 4½ stars and states "Cannonball Adderley's finest group is heard at the peak of their powers on this two-LP set... these musicians were very familiar with each other's playing and they had grown together. The enthusiastic Japanese crowds inspired the all-star band to some of their most rewarding playing... It's a definitive portrait of a classic group".

Professional ratings
Review scores
Source	Rating
Allmusic	4.5/5 stars
The Rolling Stone Jazz Record Guide	3/5 stars

== Track listing ==
Side One:

1. "Nippon Soul (Nihon No Soul)" (Julian "Cannonball" Adderley) - 9:34
2. "Easy to Love" (Cole Porter) - 3:49
3. "The Weaver" (Yusef Lateef) - 10:50

Side Two:

1. "Tengo Tango" (Julian "Cannonball" Adderley, Nat Adderley) - 2:40
2. "Come Sunday" (Duke Ellington) - 7:03
3. "Brother John" (Lateef) - 13:03

Side Three:

1. 'Work Song" (Nat Adderley) - 9:06
2. "Autumn Leaves" (Joseph Kosma, Jacques Prévert) - 7:27
3. "Dizzy's Business" (Ernie Wilkins) - 6:01

Side Four:

1. "Primitivo" (J. Adderley) - 12:12
2. "Jive Samba" (N. Adderley) - 10:37

- Recorded at Koseinenkin Kaikan in Tokyo, Japan on July 9 (Sides Three, tracks 1 & 3 and Side Four, track 2), and Sankei Hall in Tokyo, Japan on July 14 (Side One, tracks 2 & 3 and Side Three, track 2) and 15 (Side One track 1 and Side Two and Side Four, track 2), 1963

== Personnel ==
- Cannonball Adderley - alto saxophone
- Nat Adderley - cornet
- Yusef Lateef - tenor saxophone, flute, oboe
- Joe Zawinul - piano
- Sam Jones - bass
- Louis Hayes - drums
