= Autumn Leaves (Cannonball Adderley album) =

Live album by Cannonball Adderley
- Released: 1975
- Recorded: July 9, 14 & 15, 1963
- Genre: Jazz
- Label: Riverside (Japan)

Cannonball Adderley chronology
Cannonball's Bossa Nova (1962)	Autumn Leaves (1975)	Nippon Soul (1963)

Autumn Leaves is a live album by jazz saxophonist Cannonball Adderley recorded at the Kosei-nenkin Kaikan and Sankei Hall in Tokyo during his 1963 Japanese tour and featuring performances by Adderley with Nat Adderley, Yusef Lateef, Joe Zawinul, Sam Jones and Louis Hayes. The album was released on the Japanese Riverside label and features additional material from the Sankai Hall concert that produced Adderley's Nippon Soul (1963) and additional performances from a concert recorded a week earlier. Both albums were released on the US compilation The Japanese Concerts in 1975.

== Track listing ==
1. 'Work Song" (Nat Adderley) - 9:06
2. "Autumn Leaves" (Joseph Kosma, Jacques Prévert) - 7:27
3. "Dizzy's Business" (Ernie Wilkins) - 6:01
4. "Primitivo" (J. Adderley) - 12:12
5. "Jive Samba" (N. Adderley) - 10:37
  - Recorded at Koseinenkin Kaikan in Tokyo, Japan, on July 9 (tracks 1, 3 & 4), and Sankei Hall in Tokyo, Japan, on July 14 (track 2) and 15 (track 5), 1963

== Personnel ==
- Cannonball Adderley - alto saxophone
- Nat Adderley - cornet
- Yusef Lateef - tenor saxophone, flute, oboe
- Joe Zawinul - piano
- Sam Jones - bass
- Art Blakey - drums
