= The Sextet (album) =

Live album by Cannonball Adderley
- Released: 1982
- Recorded: September 21, 1962 and July 9 & 14, 1963
- Venue: Jazz Workshop, San Francisco, CA Koseinenkin Kaikan, Tokyo, Japan and Sankei Hall, Tokyo, Japan
- Genre: Jazz
- Length: 41:19
- Label: Milestone; M-9106
- Producer: Orrin Keepnews

Cannonball Adderley chronology
Nippon Soul (1964)	The Sextet (1982)	Cannonball Adderley Live! (1964)

The Sextet is a live album by the jazz saxophonist Cannonball Adderley recorded in 1962–63 but not released by the Milestone label until 1982 and featuring performances by Adderley with Nat Adderley, Yusef Lateef, Joe Zawinul, Sam Jones and Louis Hayes recorded in San Francisco and Japan. The album features previously unreleased performances from the Jazz Workshop residency that produced Jazz Workshop Revisited and from the Japanese concerts that produced Nippon Soul.

== Reception ==
Professional ratings
Review scores
Source	Rating
Allmusic	3/5 stars

The Allmusic review by Scott Yanow says, "Because most of this material had been recorded just a couple years earlier, these versions of such songs as "This Here," "Bohemia After Dark" and "New Delhi" were unissued until the 1980s. The music remains quite exciting and fresh for, although somewhat overshadowed at the time, this was one of the great jazz groups of the 1960s".

== Track listing ==
1. "This Here" (Bobby Timmons) – 11:27
2. "Never Say Yes" (Nat Adderley) – 8:41
3. "Peter and the Goats" (Yusef Lateef) – 6:45
4. "New Delhi" (Victor Feldman) – 9:37
5. "Bohemia After Dark" (Oscar Pettiford) – 4:49
- Recorded on September 21, 1962 at the Jazz Workshop, San Francisco, CA (tracks 2–4) on July 9, 1963 at Koseinenkin Kaikan, Tokyo, Japan (track 1) and on July 14 at Sankei Hall, Tokyo, Japan (track 5)

== Personnel ==
- Cannonball Adderley – alto saxophone
- Nat Adderley – cornet
- Yusef Lateef – tenor saxophone, flute
- Joe Zawinul – piano
- Sam Jones – bass
- Louis Hayes – drums
