= Money in the Pocket =

Money in the Pocket may refer to:

- Money in the Pocket (Joe Zawinul album), 1967
- Money in the Pocket (Cannonball Adderley album), recorded in 1966 and released in 2005
