= Cannonball in Japan =

Live album by The Cannonball Adderley Quintet
- Released: 1966
- Recorded: August 26, 1966 in Tokyo, Japan
- Venue: Sankei Hall, Tokyo
- Genre: Jazz
- Length: 43:22
- Label: Capitol
- Producer: Cannonball Adderley

Cannonball Adderley chronology
Great Love Themes (1966)	Cannonball in Japan (1966)	Mercy, Mercy, Mercy! Live at "The Club" (1967)

Cannonball in Japan is a live recording by the Cannonball Adderley Quintet at the Sankei Hall in Tokyo which was first released on the Japanese Capitol label in 1966 before being more widely released on CD in 1990.

== Reception ==
Professional ratings
Review scores
Source	Rating
The Penguin Guide to Jazz	2/4 stars
Allmusic	3.5/5 stars

The Penguin Guide to Jazz states "Cannonball in Japan is another live show in a favourite location: the group play well enough, but it won't enrich any who have other Adderley records". The Allmusic review stated "Japanese live albums are almost always a delight. Respectful audiences and high-fidelity recording equipment usually combine to make terrific-sounding records of strong, intense performances. Julian "Cannonball" Adderley's fantastic live document In Japan is no exception. Recorded in August 1966 in Tokyo, In Japan features the alto saxophonist at the peak of his career. Backed by his best band—cornet player Nat Adderley, electric pianist Joe Zawinul, bassist Victor Gaskin, and drummer Roy McCurdy—Adderley runs through a fairly standard set but does so in anything but a workmanlike way".

== Track listing ==
1. "Work Song" (Oscar Brown Jr., Nat Adderley) – 4:30
2. "Mercy, Mercy, Mercy" (Joe Zawinul) – 5:20
3. "This Here" (Bobby Timmons, Jon Hendricks) – 10:09
4. "Money in the Pocket" (Joe Zawinul, James Rowser) – 10:39
5. "The Sticks" ("Cannonball" Adderley) – 4:03
6. "Jive Samba" (Nat Adderley) – 8:36

== Personnel ==
- Julian "Cannonball" Adderley – alto sax
- Nat Adderley – cornet
- Joe Zawinul – piano
- Victor Gaskin – bass
- Roy McCurdy – drums
