= Stories of the Danube =

Studio album by Joe Zawinul
- Released: August 1996
- Recorded: November 1995; February 1996
- Studio: Dukla Radio Studio, Brno, Czech Republic (1995); The Music Room, NYC (1996)
- Genre: Jazz
- Label: Philips Records
- Producer: Stan Taal, Wolfgang Winkler

Joe Zawinul chronology
Lost Tribes (1992)	Stories of the Danube (1996)	My People (1996)

Professional ratings
Review scores
Source	Rating
Allmusic	3/5 stars

Stories of the Danube is a symphony based on the river Danube by Joe Zawinul, which was commissioned by the Brucknerhaus in Linz. It was first performed as part of the Linzer Klangwolke (a large-scale open-air broadcast event), for the opening of the 1993 Bruckner Festival in Linz, on September 12. In its seven movements (plus a finale), the symphony traces the course of the Danube from Donaueschingen through various countries ending at the Black Sea.

== Recording ==
The symphony was recorded as a studio album by the Brno Philharmonic Orchestra, conducted by Caspar Richter, at Dukla Radio Studio, Brno, in November 1995 and Music Room, New York City, in February 1996.

== Track listing ==
1. "Beginning: In the depths of the forest a spring wells up: A river is born" – 5:49
2. "Mountain Waters: Waterfalls of melted snow cascade into the young river" – 3:30
3. "Empire: An impression of life in the reign of emperor Franz Joseph at the turn of the century" – 11:22
4. "Intro" – 3:52
5. "Gypsy: History of a free people without a home" – 7:35
6. "Voice of the Danube: On the riverbed, an imposing rock watches History" – 5:53
7. "Unknown Soldier: A stream of blood and violence: The Second World War" – 5:52
8. "Intro" – 4:26
9. "Sultan: 900 years of Ottoman Empire" – 7:59
10. "Finale: The nations of the Danube celebrate peace" – 2:33

== Personnel ==
- Joe Zawinul - keyboards, vocals
- Caspar Richter - conductor
- Amit Chatterjee - guitar, vocals
- Burhan Öçal - percussion, vocals
- Arto Tunçboyacıyan - percussion, vocals
- Walter Grassman - drums
- Brno Philharmonic Orchestra
