= Sayin' Somethin' =

Studio album by Nat Adderley
- Released: 1966
- Recorded: February 16, 1966
- Genre: Jazz
- Label: Atlantic

Nat Adderley chronology
Autobiography (1964)	Sayin' Somethin' (1966)	Live at Memory Lane (1966)

Sayin' Somethin' is an album by jazz cornetist Nat Adderley, released on the Atlantic label and featuring four performances by Adderley with an 11-piece orchestra and four by Adderley's Quintet with Joe Henderson, Herbie Hancock, Bob Cranshaw, and Roy McCurdy.

== Reception ==
The AllMusic review by Scott Yanow states, "Cornetist Nat Adderley was at the peak of his powers in the mid-1960s... making this set one to search for". The Penguin Guide to Jazz awarded the album 3 stars, stating, "Hearing Nat in the presence of both Joe Henderson and Herbie Hancock provides ample reminder that his approach to hard bop and soul-jazz was one that very much stayed up with the times".

Professional ratings
Review scores
Source	Rating
AllMusic	3/5 stars
The Penguin Guide to Jazz	3/4 stars

== Track listing ==
Walls Of Jericho Sample
An audio sample of "Walls Of Jericho" (1966)

All compositions by Nat Adderley except as indicated

1. "Manchild" - 2:48
2. "Call Me" (Tony Hatch) - 3:08
3. "Walls of Jericho" (Traditional) - 6:56
4. "Gospelette" - 3:13
5. "Satin Doll" (Duke Ellington, Billy Strayhorn, Johnny Mercer) - 2:43
6. "Cantaloupe Island" (Herbie Hancock) - 7:22
7. "Hippodelphia" (Joe Zawinul) - 3:42
8. "The Other Side" - 7:07

- Recorded in New York City on January 13, 1966 (tracks 3, & 6-8) and December 20, 1965 (tracks 1, 2, 4 & 5)

== Personnel ==
- Nat Adderley – cornet
- Joe Henderson (tracks 3, & 6–8) - tenor saxophone
- Ernie Royal (tracks 1, 2, 4 & 5) - trumpet
- Artie Kaplan, Seldon Powell (tracks 1, 2, 4 & 5) - saxophones
- J.J. Johnson (tracks 1, 2, 4 & 5) - trombone
- Herbie Hancock (tracks 6–8), John Asbury (track 3), Paul Griffin (tracks 1, 2, 4 & 5) - piano
- Bob Cranshaw (tracks 3, & 6–8), George Duvivier (tracks 1, 2, 4 & 5) - bass
- Herb Lovelle (tracks 1, 2, 4 & 5), Roy McCurdy (tracks 3, & 6–8) - drums
- Al Gorgoni, Billy Suyker (tracks 1, 2, 4 & 5) - guitar
- George Devens (tracks 1, 2, 4 & 5) - percussion
