= Cannonball in Europe! =

Live album by Cannonball Adderley
- Released: 1962
- Recorded: August 4–5, 1962
- Genre: Jazz
- Length: 50:20
- Label: Capitol
- Producer: Joe Napoli

Cannonball Adderley chronology
Back Door Blues (1962)	Cannonball in Europe! (1962)	Jazz Workshop Revisited (1962)

Cannonball in Europe! is a live album by jazz saxophonist Cannonball Adderley recorded at the Comblain-la-Tour in Belgium and released on the Capitol label featuring performances by Adderley with Nat Adderley, Yusef Lateef, Joe Zawinul, Sam Jones and Louis Hayes.

== Reception ==
Professional ratings
Review scores
Source	Rating
The Penguin Guide to Jazz	3/4 stars
Allmusic	4/5 stars

The Penguin Guide to Jazz states "Bringing in Joe Zawinul and Yusef Lateef energised the band anew but Lateef's touches of exotica are an awkward match for the sunnier disposition of the customary material, Nevertheless Nippon Soul and In Europe are perhaps the best of this bunch". The Allmusic review by Al Campbell awarded the album 4 stars and states "Cannonball Adderley is in excellent form on this live date".

== Track listing ==
1. "P. Bouk" (Yusef Lateef) – 10:23
2. A Few Words from Cannonball – 1:00
3. "Gemini" (Jimmy Heath) – 12:45
4. "Work Song" (Nat Adderley) – 8:25
5. More Words from Cannonball – 0:22
6. "Trouble in Mind" (Richard M. Jones) – 10:19
7. "Dizzy's Business" (Ernie Wilkins) – 7:38
- Recorded at the Comblain-la-Tour, Belgium, on August 4 & 5, 1962

== Personnel ==
- Cannonball Adderley – alto saxophone
- Nat Adderley – cornet
- Yusef Lateef – tenor saxophone, flute, oboe
- Joe Zawinul – piano
- Sam Jones – bass
- Louis Hayes – drums
