= Dezron Douglas =

American jazz double bassist

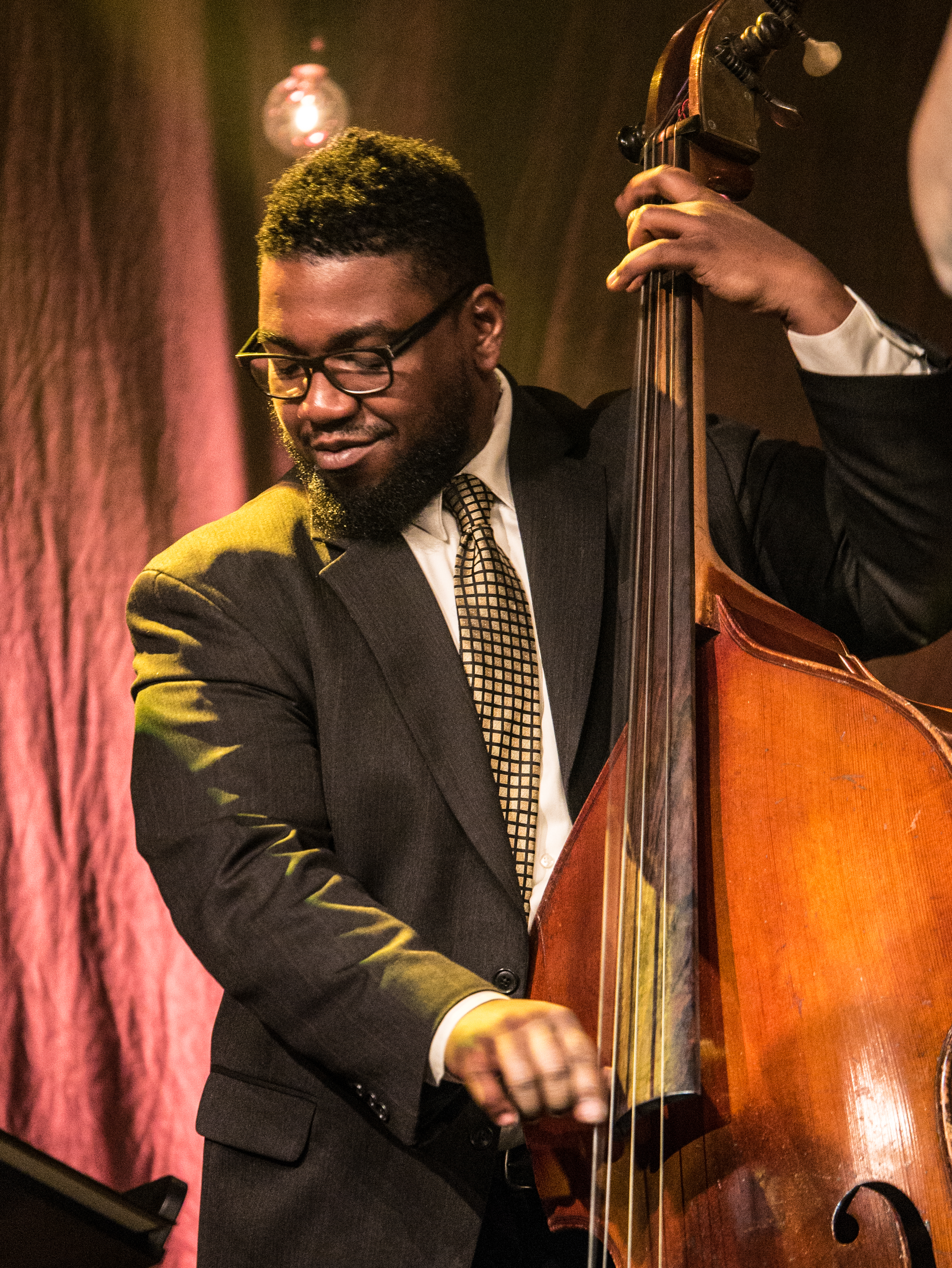
- Douglas at the Moers Festival, Germany, 2015

Background information
- Born: Dezron Lamont Douglas; Hartford, Connecticut, U.S.
- Genre: Jazz
- Occupation: Musician
- Instrument: Double bass
- Years active: 2004–present
- Member of: Trey Anastasio Band

Dezron Lamont Douglas is an American jazz double bassist, composer and producer.

== Biography ==
Douglas was raised in Hartford, Connecticut and studied tuba and bass at the Hartford Conservatory of Music. He attended The Hartt School at the University of Hartford majoring in African American Music and History under the tutelage of alto saxophonist Jackie McLean. He is the nephew of drummer and composer Walter Bolden.

Douglas has released six albums as a leader. His 2012 debut record, Live at Smalls, earned a positive review in The New York Times, which wrote: "Learned as it may be, this is living-language music — jazz as it’s practiced, more than as it’s studied."

As a sideman, Douglas has recorded with Cyrus Chestnut, Michael Carvin, Louis Hayes, Steve Davis, George Cables, Papo Vasquez, Enrico Rava, Eric Reed, Abraham Burton, Eric McPherson, Tomasz Stańko, Makaya McCraven and Brandee Younger. In April 2019, Douglas' playing was featured in the documentary Homecoming, by Beyoncé. The recording used was from an NPR Music field recording released in 2013.

He is longstanding member of the Ravi Coltrane Quartet and has performed with the Louis Hayes Jazz Communicators.

In 2019, Douglas was the winner of the Downbeat critics poll in the category of "Rising Star bassist". Douglas was featured on DownBeat magazine's July 2020 cover along with Brandee Younger and six other artists.

In 2021, Dezron joined the Trey Anastasio Band, replacing the late Tony Markellis.

== Discography ==
=== As leader ===
- 2012 Underground, Independent
- 2012 Walkin' My Baby Back Home (Venus)
- 2012 Ganbare Nippon (Venus)
- 2013 Dezron Douglas Live at Smalls (Smalls Live)
- 2016 DE3: Live at Maxwells (Sunnyside)
- 2017 Soul Jazz (Venus)
- 2018 Black Lion, Independent
- 2019 "Solomon Grundy", Independent (single)
- 2020 "Cobra", Independent (single)
- 2020 Force Majeure with Brandee Younger (International Anthem)
- 2021 "Meditations on Faith", Independent (single)
- 2022 "Freeway", Independent (single)
- 2022 Atalaya (International Anthem)

=== As sideman ===
With Cyrus Chestnut

- 2007 Cyrus Plays Elvis (Koch)
- 2010 Journeys (Jazz Legacy)
- 2010 Plenty Swing, Plenty Soul: Live at Dizzy's with Eric Reed (Savant)
- 2011 Moonlight Sonata (Venus)
- 2012 The Cyrus Chestnut Quartet (WJ3)
- 2013 Soul Brother Cool (WJ3)

With Steve Davis

- 2008 Outlook
- 2011 Images: The Hartford Suite
- 2019 Correlations

With Louis Hayes

- 2014 Return of the Jazz Communicators (Smoke Sessions)
- 2014 Live at Cory Weeds Cellar Jazz Club (Cellar Live)
- 2017 Serenade for Horace (Blue Note)
- 2021 Crisis (Savant)
- 2023 Exactly Right! (Savant)
- 2024 Artform Revisited (Savant)

With Makaya McCraven

- 2018 Universal Beings
- 2020 Universal Beings E&F sides

With Leslie Odom, Jr.

- Simply Christmas (S-Curve, 2016)

With Brandee Younger

- 2011 Prelude, Independent
- 2014 The Brandee Younger 4tet, Live at the Breeding Ground, Independent
- 2015 Supreme Sonacy (Blue Note/Revive Music)
- 2016 Wax & Wane (Revive Music)
- 2018 A Day In The Life: Impressions of Pepper (Impulse!)
- 2019 Soul Awakening Independent
- 2021 Somewhere Different (Impulse!)
