= Autobiography (Nat Adderley album) =

Studio album by Nat Adderley
- Released: 1965
- Recorded: December 21, 1964 – January 7, 1965
- Genre: Soul jazz, hard bop
- Label: Atlantic
- Producer: Nat Adderley

Nat Adderley chronology
Little Big Horn (1963)	Autobiography (1965)	Sayin' Somethin' (1966)

Professional ratings
Review scores
Source	Rating
AllMusic	4/5 stars
Record Mirror	4/5 stars

Autobiography is an album by jazz cornetist Nat Adderley. It was released in 1965 as a vinyl record, his first after moving to Atlantic Records. It includes elements from the genres of soul jazz and hard bop and a performance of what is arguably one of his best-known achievements, "Work Song", which was produced during his time with his brother Cannonball Adderley's second quartet.

Playing with Adderley are Ernie Royal on trumpet, Benny Powell on trombone, Don Butterfield on tuba, Seldon Powell on tenor saxophone and flute, Josef Zawinul on piano, Sam Jones on bass, Grady Tate on drums, and Willie Bobo on percussion.

== Track listing ==
1. "Sermonette"
2. "Work Song"
3. "The Old Country"
4. "Junkanoo"
5. "Stony Island"
6. "Little Boy with the Sad Eyes"
7. "Never Say Yes"
8. "Jive Samba"
