= Live at Memory Lane =

Live album by Nat Adderley
- Released: 1967
- Recorded: October 31, 1966
- Genre: Jazz
- Label: Atlantic

Nat Adderley chronology
Sayin' Somethin' (1966)	Live at Memory Lane (1967)	The Scavenger (1968)

Live at Memory Lane is a live album by jazz cornetist Nat Adderley released on the Atlantic label featuring performances by Adderley's Quintet with Joe Henderson, Joe Zawinul, Victor Gaskin, and Roy McCurdy.

== Reception ==
The Allmusic review awarded the album 2½ stars.

Professional ratings
Review scores
Source	Rating
Allmusic	2.5/5 stars

== Track listing ==
All compositions by Nat Adderley except as indicated

1. "On My Journey Now" - 4:49
2. "Fun" - 6:40
3. "In the Good Old Summertime" (George Evans, Ren Shields) - 9:49
4. "Lavender Woman" (Joe Zawinul) - 8:16
5. "Painted Desert" (Zawinul) - 8:48
6. "Theme" (Adderley, Zawinul) - 4:49

- Recorded at Memory Lane, San Francisco, CA on October 31, 1966

== Personnel ==
- Nat Adderley – cornet
- Joe Henderson (tracks 2–6) – tenor saxophone
- Joe Zawinul – piano
- Victor Gaskin – bass
- Roy McCurdy – drums
