= Great Love Themes =

Studio album by Cannonball Adderley
- Released: May 1966
- Recorded: April 6–7, 1966
- Genre: Jazz
- Label: Capitol
- Producer: Tom Morgan

Cannonball Adderley chronology
| Money in the Pocket (1966) | Great Love Themes (1966) | Cannonball in Japan (1966) |

Professional ratings
Review scores
| Source | Rating |
|---|---|
| AllMusic | 1/5 stars |

Great Love Themes is an album recorded in April 1966 by jazz saxophonist Julian Edwin "Cannonball" Adderley. It was released on the Capitol label featuring performances of ballads ― mostly Broadway show tunes ― by Cannonball Adderley with Nat Adderley, Joe Zawinul, Herbie Lewis, Roy McCurdy, and with string arrangements by Ray Ellis. AllMusic awarded the album 1 star. The album was produced by Tom Morgan, rather than Adderley's usual producer, David Axelrod. According to Adderley's biographer, Cary Ginell, "Although Cannonball loved to play show tunes, the lush, watered-down arrangements did not excite listeners, who had long since wearied of the jazz-artist-with-strings formula. Axelrod recalled that Cannonball hated the album and convinced Capitol to let him go back to working with Axelrod from then on."

== Track listing ==
1. "Somewhere" (Leonard Bernstein) – 2:50
2. "The Song Is You" (Jerome Kern, Oscar Hammerstein II) – 3:14
3. "Autumn Leaves" (Joseph Kosma, Johnny Mercer) – 3:27
4. "I Concentrate on You" (Cole Porter) – 3:40
5. "This Can´t Be Love" (Richard Rodgers, Lorenz Hart) – 2:37
6. "Stella By Starlight" (Victor Young, Ned Washington) – 3:04
7. "Morning of the Carnival (Manhã de Carnaval)" (Luis Bonfá, Antônio Maria) – 3:29
8. "The End of a Love Affair" (Edward C. Redding) – 4:25
9. "So In Love" (Porter) – 3:28

- Recorded in New York City, NY, on April 6 (tracks 1, 3 & 6-8) and April 7 (tracks 2, 4, 5 & 9), 1966

== Personnel ==
- Cannonball Adderley – alto saxophone
- Nat Adderley – cornet
- Joe Zawinul – piano
- Herbie Lewis – bass
- Roy McCurdy – drums
- Unidentified strings
- Ray Ellis – conductor, arranger
