= Nippon Soul =

Live album by Cannonball Adderley
- Released: March 1964
- Recorded: July 9, 1963 (#7); Koseinenkin Kaikan, Tokyo; July 14, 1963 (#2–3); July 15, 1963 (#1, 4–6); Sankei Hall, Tokyo
- Genre: Jazz
- Length: 46:42
- Label: Riverside; RLP 477
- Producer: Orrin Keepnews

Cannonball Adderley chronology
Cannonball's Bossa Nova (1963)	Nippon Soul (1964)	The Sextet (1964)

Nippon Soul is a live album by jazz saxophonist Cannonball Adderley recorded at the Sankei Hall in Tokyo during his 1963 Japanese tour and released on the Riverside label (RLP 477) featuring performances by Adderley with Nat Adderley, Yusef Lateef, Joe Zawinul, Sam Jones and Louis Hayes. The CD release added a bonus track recorded the previous week and originally released on The Japanese Concerts (1975).

== Reception ==
Professional ratings
Review scores
Source	Rating
Allmusic	4/5 stars
The Penguin Guide to Jazz	3/4 stars

The AllMusic review by Stewart Mason awarded the album 4 stars, and stated: "a solid live set that showcases one of Cannonball Adderley's finest groups... Often overlooked, this is one of Adderley's finest albums". The Penguin Guide to Jazz awarded the album 3 stars, stating: "Zawinul is still no more than a good bandsman, and Lateef's touches of exotica – such as the oboe solo on 'Brother John' or his furry Roland Kirk-like flute improvisations – are an awkward match for the sunnier disposition of the customary material."

== Track listing ==
1. "Nippon Soul (Nihon No Soul)" (Julian "Cannonball" Adderley) – 9:34
2. "Easy to Love" (Cole Porter) – 3:49
3. "The Weaver" (Yusef Lateef) – 10:50
4. "Tengo Tango" (Julian "Cannonball" Adderley, Nat Adderley) – 2:40
5. "Come Sunday" (Duke Ellington) – 7:03
6. "Brother John" (Lateef) – 13:03
7. "Work Song" (Nat Adderley) – 9:06 (Bonus track on CD)

== Personnel ==
- Cannonball Adderley – alto saxophone
- Nat Adderley – cornet
- Yusef Lateef – tenor saxophone, flute, oboe
- Joe Zawinul – piano
- Sam Jones – bass
- Louis Hayes – drums
