= Light and Lively =

Studio album by Louis Hayes Quintet
- Released: 1989
- Recorded: April 21, 1989
- Genre: Jazz
- Length: 65:37 CD release with bonus track
- Label: SteepleChase; SCS 1245
- Producer: Nils Winther

Louis Hayes chronology
| Variety Is the Spice (1978) | Light and Lively (1989) | The Crawl (1989) |

Light and Lively is an album by the drummer Louis Hayes, recorded in 1989 and released on the Danish SteepleChase label.

== Reception ==
Professional ratings
Review scores
| Source | Rating |
|---|---|
| AllMusic | 4/5 stars |
| The Penguin Guide to Jazz Recordings | 3/4 stars |

The AllMusic review called the album "another good one".

== Track listing ==
1. "Light and Lively" (Louis Hayes) – 12:27
2. "If You Could See Me Now" (Tadd Dameron, Carl Sigman) – 8:25
3. "Enchantment" (Horace Silver) – 6:13
4. "The 10th Dimension" (Clint Houston) – 11:57 Bonus track on CD
5. "For the Love of What" (Charles Tolliver) – 6:21
6. "Darian" (Houston) – 9:48
7. "Blues for Macao" (Houston) – 10:26

== Personnel ==
- Louis Hayes – drums
- Charles Tolliver – trumpet
- Bobby Watson – alto saxophone
- Kenny Barron – piano
- Clint Houston – bass
