= Domination (Cannonball Adderley album) =

Studio album by Cannonball Adderley
- Released: June 1965
- Recorded: April 26, 1965 & May 20, 1970 (bonus track)
- Genre: Jazz
- Label: Capitol
- Producer: David Axelrod

Cannonball Adderley chronology
Cannonball Adderley's Fiddler on the Roof (1964)	Domination (1965)	Money in the Pocket (1966)

Domination is an album by jazz saxophonist Cannonball Adderley released on the Capitol label in 1965 and featuring performances by Adderley with an orchestra conducted by Oliver Nelson. The CD release added the bonus track "Experience in E" composed by Joe Zawinul and originally released on the 1970 album The Cannonball Adderley Quintet & Orchestra.

== Reception ==
The Allmusic review by Michael G. Nastos awarded the album three stars, and states: "While not an essential or pivotal recording in Cannonball Adderley's career, Domination is one of few big-band joint efforts, an intriguing studio-produced sidebar in his otherwise stellar discography." The All About Jazz review by Chris May calls the album "a curio for Cannonball fans, but something of more substantial interest to those interested in Zawinul's trajectory". The Penguin Guide to Jazz awarded the album 3½ stars, stating: "Both Adderleys feature through a series of monumental sounding charts by Oliver Nelson - which come through mightily in an exemplary remastering - on some very enterprising material."

Professional ratings
Review scores
Source	Rating
Allmusic	3/5 stars
The Penguin Guide to Jazz	3.5/4 stars

== Track listing ==
All compositions by Julian "Cannonball" Adderley except as indicated

1. "Domination" - 3:37
2. "Cyclops" (Nat Adderley) - 4:40
3. "Introduction to a Samba" - 5:08
4. "Shake a Lady" (Ray Bryant) - 3:00
5. "Interlude" (Jay Jay Johnson) - 4:49
6. "Mystified (aka Angel Face)" (Joe Zawinul) - 3:45
7. "I Worship You" (Cole Porter) - 6:17
8. "Gon Gong" (Victor Feldman) - 3:31
9. "Experience in E" (William Fischer, Zawinul) - 20:11
- Recorded at Capitol Studios in New York City, NY on April 26, 1965 (tracks 1–8) and Los Angeles, CA on May 20, 1970 (track 9)

== Personnel ==
- Cannonball Adderley - alto saxophone
- Nat Adderley - cornet, trumpet
- Jimmy Maxwell, Jimmy Nottingham, Clark Terry, Snooky Young - trumpet (tracks 1–8)
- Jimmy Cleveland, Willie Dennis, Jay Jay Johnson - trombone (tracks 1–8)
- Don Butterfield - tuba (tracks 1–8)
- Marshal Royal, Phil Woods - alto saxophone (tracks 1–8)
- Budd Johnson - tenor saxophone, clarinet, flute (tracks 1–8)
- Bob Ashton - tenor saxophone, bass clarinet, flute (tracks 1–8)
- Danny Bank - baritone saxophone, bass clarinet, flute (tracks 1–8)
- Joe Zawinul - piano, electric piano
- Richard Davis (tracks 1, 2, 7 & 8), Sam Jones (tracks 3–6), Walter Booker (track 9) - bass
- Grady Tate (tracks 1, 2, 7 & 8), Louis Hayes (tracks 3–6), Roy McCurdy (track 9) - drums
- Unidentified percussion (tracks 3, 4 & 6)
- Unidentified 42-piece orchestra (track 9)
- Oliver Nelson (tracks 1–8) William Fischer (track 9) - conductor, arranger
