= Una Max =

Studio album by Louis Hayes Sextet
- Released: 1990
- Recorded: December 19, 1989
- Genre: Jazz
- Length: 61:15
- Label: SteepleChase; SCCD 31263
- Producer: Nils Winther

Louis Hayes chronology
| The Crawl (1989) | Una Max (1990) | Nightfall (1991) |

Una Max is an album by the drummer Louis Hayes, recorded in 1989 and released on the Danish SteepleChase label.

== Reception ==
Professional ratings
Review scores
| Source | Rating |
|---|---|
| AllMusic | 4/5 stars |
| The Penguin Guide to Jazz Recordings | 3.5/4 stars |

The AllMusic review stated: "This rewarding date is worthy of wider recognition".

== Track listing ==
1. "El Cid" (Clint Houston) – 7:14
2. "Ibis" (Kenny Barron) – 9:30
3. "You Don't Know What Love Is" (Gene de Paul, Don Raye) – 9:36
4. "Geri" (Houston) – 9:35
5. "Una Max" (Louis Hayes, Houston) – 7:41
6. "Saudade" (Houston) – 8:24
7. "Ruthie's Heart" (Charles Tolliver) – 9:15

== Personnel ==
- Louis Hayes – drums
- Charles Tolliver – trumpet
- Gerald Hayes – alto saxophone
- John Stubblefield – tenor saxophone
- Kenny Barron – piano
- Clint Houston – bass
