= Serenade for Horace =

Studio album by Louis Hayes
- Released: 2017
- Genre: Jazz
- Label: Blue Note
- Producer: Don Was, Dezron Douglas

Louis Hayes chronology
Return of the Jazz Communicators (2014)	Serenade for Horace (2017)

Serenade for Horace is an album by the jazz drummer Louis Hayes, released in 2017. It is a tribute to Horace Silver, Hayes's former bandleader.

The album peaked at No. 23 on Billboard's Jazz Albums chart.

== Production ==
The album was produced by Don Was and Dezron Douglas. Gregory Porter contributed vocals to "Song for My Father". "Hastings Street", about Detroit's Black Bottom neighborhood, is the only song penned by Hayes.

== Critical reception ==
The New York Times wrote that the album "finds Hayes swinging briskly as he revisits the tunes he played in the early years, when he helped define the classic hard-bop sound." DownBeat noted that "some of the album’s best playing ... can be found on the heads, thanks to arrangements that treat the rhythm parts as though they were as integral as the melody—which, of course, they are."

The Milwaukee Journal Sentinel opined that Hayes "gathers up a fine bunch of musicians to buttress his rhythmic tribute to and interpretation of Horace Silver." The Buffalo News panned the album, concluding that "the best thing about this disc, by far, are Hayes' personal and wonderful notes."

== Track listing ==
1. Ecaroh
2. Señor Blues
3. Song for My Father
4. Hastings Street
5. Strollin’
6. Juicy Lucy
7. Silver’s Serenade
8. Lonely Woman
9. Summer in Central Park
10. St. Vitus Dance
11. Room 608

== Personnel ==
- Louis Hayes – drums
- Abraham Burton – tenor saxophone
- Steve Nelson – vibraphone
- David Bryant – piano
- Dezron Douglas – bass
- Josh Evans – trumpet
