= Them Dirty Blues =

Studio album by The Cannonball Adderley Quintet
- Released: 1960
- Recorded: February 1, 1960; Reeves Sound Studio, New York City; March 29, 1960; Ter-Mar Recording Studio, Chicago
- Genre: Jazz
- Length: 51:12
- Label: Riverside; RLP 12-322
- Producer: Orrin Keepnews

The Cannonball Adderley Quintet chronology
The Cannonball Adderley Quintet in San Francisco (1959)	Them Dirty Blues (1960)	Cannonball Adderley and the Poll-Winners (1960)

Them Dirty Blues is an album by the Cannonball Adderley Quintet, recorded in 1960.

== Reception ==
The AllMusic review by Al Campbell awarded the album 4 stars, stating: "Recorded in early 1960, Them Dirty Blues contains two classic jazz compositions." The Penguin Guide to Jazz awarded the album 3⅓ stars, noting: "Them Dirty Blues debuts Nat's 'Work Song' in the band's book, as well as Bobby Timmons's 'Dat Dere'."

The album includes two other tunes which have become jazz standards: "Del Sasser" and "Jeannine".

Professional ratings
Review scores
Source	Rating
AllMusic	4/5 stars
The Penguin Guide to Jazz	3.5/4 stars

== Track listing ==
(1960 Riverside LP issue)

- A1 "Work Song" – 5:04
- A2 "Dat Dere" – 5:27
- A3 "Easy Living" – 4:19
- A4 "Del Sasser" – 4:38
- B1 "Jeannine" – 7:15
- B2 "Soon" – 5:32
- B3 "Them Dirty Blues" – 7:10

(2000 Capitol/Blue Note CD reissue)

1. "Work Song" (Nat Adderley) – 5:05
2. "Jeannine" (Duke Pearson) – 7:15
3. "Easy Living" (Ralph Rainger, Leo Robin) – 4:20
4. "Them Dirty Blues" (Julian "Cannonball" Adderley) – 7:10
5. "Dat Dere" (Bobby Timmons) – 5:28
6. "Del Sasser" (Sam Jones) – 4:40
7. "Soon" (George Gershwin, Ira Gershwin) – 5:34
8. "Work Song" (Alternate First Version) – 5:49
9. "Dat Dere" (Alternate Take) – 5:28
- Tracks 1–4 recorded March 29, 1960 at Ter-Mar Recording Studio, Chicago.
- Tracks 5–9 recorded February 1, 1960 at Reeves Sound Studio, New York City.

== Personnel ==
- Julian "Cannonball" Adderley – alto sax
- Nat Adderley – cornet
- Barry Harris (tracks 1–4) – piano
- Bobby Timmons (tracks 5–9) – piano
- Sam Jones – bass
- Louis Hayes – drums
