= The Cannonball Adderley Quintet at the Lighthouse =

Live album by Cannonball Adderley
- Released: 1960
- Recorded: October 16, 1960
- Genre: Jazz
- Length: 52:30
- Label: Riverside
- Producer: Orrin Keepnews

Cannonball Adderley chronology
Cannonball Adderley and the Poll Winners (1960)	The Cannonball Adderley Quintet at the Lighthouse (1960)	Know What I Mean? (1961)

The Cannonball Adderley Quintet at the Lighthouse is a live album by jazz saxophonist Cannonball Adderley released on the Riverside label featuring a performance by Adderley with Nat Adderley, Victor Feldman, Sam Jones and Louis Hayes. It was recorded live at the Lighthouse Café in Hermosa Beach, California.

== Reception ==
Professional ratings
Review scores
Source	Rating
AllMusic	4/5 stars
The Penguin Guide to Jazz	4/4 stars
DownBeat	3.5/5 stars

The AllMusic review by Scott Yanow awarded the album 4 stars and states that "a fine all-around set from the Cannonball Adderley Quintet... finds his band in top form... It's a strong introduction to the music of this classic hard bop group". The Penguin Guide to Jazz awarded the album 4 stars, stating: "At the Lighthouse, which marked Vic Feldman's arrival in the group, is a near-classic, opening on the immortal version of 'Sack O' Woe' and steaming through a vintage Adderley set in front of a cheering and fingersnapping crowd".

The review by in DownBeat gave the release 3.5 stars. John S. Wilson wrote that the group, "has unusually good basic material, and the opening and closing ensembles which bring this material into focus are so intriguing that one wishes they could be developed at greater length instead of being thrown aside to let the soloists take over". He goes on to praise Nat Adderley's solo on "Blue Daniel" and the playing of Victor Feldman throughout the album. Wilson also praises Cannonball's "gracefully amusing introductions. His unique ability to talk to an audience with intelligence, civility, and wit does a great deal toward establishing a warm, receptive atmosphere for his group".

== Track listing ==
1. "Sack O' Woe" (Julian "Cannonball" Adderley) - 10:45
2. "Big 'P'" (Jimmy Heath) - 5:55
3. "Blue Daniel" (Frank Rosolino) - 7:31
4. "Azule Serape" (Victor Feldman) - 9:29
5. "Exodus" (Feldman) - 7:40
6. "What Is This Thing Called Love?" (Cole Porter) - 4:48
- Recorded at the Lighthouse Café, Hermosa Beach, CA on October 16, 1960

Some releases after about 1986 included an additional track:

- "Our Delight" (Tadd Dameron) - 6:54

== Personnel ==
- Cannonball Adderley - alto saxophone
- Nat Adderley - cornet
- Victor Feldman - piano
- Sam Jones - bass
- Louis Hayes - drums
