= The Rise and Fall of the Third Stream =

Studio album by Joe Zawinul
- Released: 1968
- Recorded: October 16 & 21, 1967; December 12, 1967
- Genre: Jazz
- Length: 30:37
- Label: Vortex Records
- Producer: Joel Dorn

Joe Zawinul chronology
Money in the Pocket (1966)	The Rise and Fall of the Third Stream (1968)	Zawinul (1971)

Professional ratings
Review scores
Source	Rating
Allmusic	4/5 stars

The Rise and Fall of the Third Stream is the second studio album by Joe Zawinul, released in 1968. The title refers to the Third stream genre of music, melding classical and jazz.

== Track listing ==
1. "Baptismal" (William Fischer) – 7:37
2. "The Soul of a Village - Part I" (William Fischer) – 2:13
3. "The Soul of a Village - Part II" (William Fischer) – 4:12
4. "The Fifth Canto" (William Fischer) – 6:55
5. "From Vienna, With Love" (Friedrich Gulda) – 4:27
6. "Lord, Lord, Lord" (William Fischer) – 3:55
7. "A Concerto, Retitled" (William Fischer) – 5:30

== Personnel ==
- Joe Zawinul - piano and electric piano
- William S. Fischer - tenor saxophone and arrangements
- Jimmy Owens - trumpet
- Alfred Brown - viola
- Selwart Clarke - viola
- Theodore Israel - viola
- Kermit Moore - cello
- Richard Davis - bass
- Roy McCurdy - drums
- Freddie Waits - drums
- Warren Smith - percussion
