= The Cannonball Adderley Sextet in New York =

Live album by Cannonball Adderley
- Released: 1962
- Recorded: January 12 & 14, 1962
- Genre: Jazz, hard bop, post-bop, soul jazz
- Length: 44:49
- Label: Riverside RLP 9404
- Producer: Orrin Keepnews

Cannonball Adderley chronology
| Nancy Wilson / Cannonball Adderley (1961) | The Cannonball Adderley Sextet in New York (1962) | Back Door Blues (1962) |

The Cannonball Adderley Sextet in New York is a live album by jazz saxophonist Cannonball Adderley recorded at the Village Vanguard and released on the Riverside label featuring performances by Adderley with Nat Adderley, Yusef Lateef, Joe Zawinul, Sam Jones and Louis Hayes.

== Reception ==
The AllMusic review by Richard S. Ginell awarded the album 4 stars, noting: "This was the recording debut of the Adderley Sextet, with Cannonball waxing eloquently and swingingly on alto, brother Nat charging ahead on cornet, and the versatile Yusef Lateef (who had joined the band only three weeks earlier) adding a bit of an edge on tenor, flute, and unusually for a jazz wind player, oboe on the odd, dirge-like 'Syn-Anthesia'. There is plenty of talk from Cannonball as well... This group would be Zawinul's springboard to prominence in the jazz world — and already his compulsively funky mastery of bop and the blues has fused tightly with the Sam Jones/Louis Hayes rhythm section." The Penguin Guide to Jazz awarded the album 2½ stars, stating: "'Bringing in Joe Zawinul and Yusef Lateef energised the band anew." When reissued in 2008, All About Jazz called the album "perhaps the single most indispensable recording by the Adderley Brothers."

Professional ratings
Review scores
| Source | Rating |
|---|---|
| AllMusic | 4/5 stars |
| DownBeat | 3.5/5 stars |
| The Penguin Guide to Jazz | 2.5/4 stars |

== Track listing ==
1. Introduction by Cannonball – 1:54
2. "Gemini" (Jimmy Heath) – 11:46
3. "Planet Earth" (Yusef Lateef) – 7:59
4. "Dizzy's Business" (Ernie Wilkins) – 6:59
5. "Syn-Anthesia" (Lateef) – 7:03
6. "Scotch and Water" (Joe Zawinul) – 5:56
7. "Cannon's Theme" (Sam Jones) – 3:17

- Recorded at the Village Vanguard in New York City, NY on January 12 & 14, 1962

== Personnel ==
- Cannonball Adderley – alto saxophone
- Nat Adderley – cornet
- Yusef Lateef – tenor saxophone, flute (# 2), oboe (# 5)
- Joe Zawinul – piano
- Sam Jones – bass
- Louis Hayes – drums
