= The Scavenger =

Studio album by Nat Adderley
- Released: 1968
- Recorded: January 18–19, 1968
- Genre: Jazz
- Length: 37:53
- Label: Milestone

Nat Adderley chronology
Live at Memory Lane (1966)	The Scavenger (1968)	You, Baby (1968)

The Scavenger is an album by jazz cornetist Nat Adderley released on the Milestone label featuring performances by Adderley's Quintet with Joe Henderson, Joe Zawinul, Victor Gaskin, and Roy McCurdy with a guest appearance by Jeremy Steig. The track "Rise, Sally, Rise" was sampled by rap group Eric B. & Rakim for their 1992 single "Know the Ledge".

== Reception ==
The Allmusic review by awarded the album 2 stars.

Professional ratings
Review scores
Source	Rating
Allmusic	2/5 stars
The Rolling Stone Jazz Record Guide	3/5 stars

== Track listing ==
All compositions by Nat Adderley except as indicated

1. "The Scavenger" (Joe Zawinul) - 8:07
2. "Bittersweet" - 4:45
3. "But Not For Me" (George Gershwin, Ira Gershwin) - 5:53
4. "Sweet Emma" - 4:47
5. "Rise, Sally, Rise" - 5:19
6. "Unilateral" - 5:58
7. "Melnat" - 3:00

- Recorded in New York City on January 18 & 19, 1968

== Personnel ==
- Nat Adderley – cornet, trumpet
- Melvin Lastie (tracks 2, 4, 5 & 7) – cornet
- Joe Henderson (tracks 1, 3, & 6) - tenor saxophone
- Joe Zawinul - piano, electric piano
- Victor Gaskin - bass
- Roy McCurdy - drums
- Jeremy Steig (track 1) - flute
