= Ca'Purange =

Studio album by Dexter Gordon
- Released: 1973
- Recorded: June 22, 1972
- Studio: Van Gelder Studio, Englewood Cliffs, New Jersey
- Genre: Jazz
- Length: 38:24
- Label: Prestige
- Producer: Ozzie Cadena

Dexter Gordon chronology
Body and Soul (1971)	Ca'Purange (1973)	Tangerine (1972)

Ca'Purange is an album by saxophonist Dexter Gordon which was recorded in 1972 and released by Prestige.

== Reception ==
Professional ratings
Review scores
Source	Rating
Allmusic	3/5 stars
The Rolling Stone Jazz Record Guide	3/5 stars
The Penguin Guide to Jazz Recordings	3.5/4 stars

Scott Yanow of Allmusic states, "Gordon was somewhat forgotten in the United States at the time (his "comeback" was still four years away), but is in excellent form". John Barret Jr. reviewed the CD reissue for All About Jazz in 1999 stating "This one takes a little while to hit its stride, but when it does, you’ll probably find something you like... It’s an enjoyable album; when Dexter gets going, he really goes. But his fans already know that".

== Track listing ==
1. "Ca'Purange" (Natalicio Moreira Lima) – 9:50
2. "The First Time Ever I Saw Your Face" (Ewan MacColl) – 5:51
3. "Oh! Karen O" (Dexter Gordon) – 12:06
4. "Airegin" (Sonny Rollins) – 5:05
5. "Airegin" [alternative take] (Rollins) – 5:32 Bonus track on CD reisuue

== Personnel ==
- Dexter Gordon – tenor saxophone
- Thad Jones – trumpet, flugelhorn
- Hank Jones – piano
- Stanley Clarke – double bass
- Louis Hayes – drums
