= Live Session! =

Live album by Cannonball Adderley & Ernie Andrews
- Released: 1964
- Recorded: September 19, 1962 & October 4, 1964
- Genre: Jazz
- Label: Capitol
- Producer: David Axelrod and Cannonball Adderley

Cannonball Adderley chronology
Cannonball Adderley Live! (1964)	Live Session! (1964)	Cannonball Adderley's Fiddler on the Roof (1964)

Live Session! is a live album by jazz saxophonist Cannonball Adderley recorded at Memory Lane, Los Angeles in 1962 and the Lighthouse, Hermosa Beach in 1964 and released on the Capitol label featuring performances by Adderley with Nat Adderley, Joe Zawinul, Sam Jones and Louis Hayes and vocalist Ernie Andrews.

== Reception ==
The Allmusic review by Ronnie D. Lankford Jr. awarded the album 4 stars and states "The material cuts a wide swath across non-jazz genres, from the bluesy "Next Time I See You" to the popular "Since I Fell for You" to the fun nonsense of "Green Door." Although the instrumental work takes a back seat to the vocals, both Cannonball and Nat Adderley find room to offer pithy solos that spice up the proceedings. The accompaniment is an active one, too, with intricate piano and horns highlighting and underlining Andrews as needed". The Penguin Guide to Jazz awarded the album 3 stars stating "Live Session actually comes from gigs two years apart, and were meant to launch the singing voice of Andrews as much as Adderley. He sounds fine but the band takes a back seat to the singer and for Cannonball fans this one's secondary".

Professional ratings
Review scores
Source	Rating
Allmusic	4/5 stars
The Penguin Guide to Jazz	3/4 stars

== Track listing ==
1. Cannonball Adderley's Introduction – 0:28
2. "Big City" (Mark Jenkin) – 3:19
3. "Next Time I See You" (Earl Forest, William G. Harvey) – 3:53
4. "I'm Always Drunk in San Francisco" (Tommy Wolf) – 3:20
5. "Ten Years of Tears" (Vicki Harrington) – 2:48
6. "Bill Bailey" (Hughie Cannon) – 3:07
7. "I'm a Born World Shaker" (Wolf, Fran Landesman, Nelson Algren) – 3:28
8. "Don't Be Afraid of Love" (Billy Davis, Berry Gordy, Jr., Harvey Pratt) – 2:52
9. "Since I Fell for You" (Buddy Johnson) – 2:13
10. "If You Never Fall in Love With Me" (Jones, Donald Wolf) – 2:55
11. "Come On Back" (Eddie Beal, Hal Levy, Len Wyatt) – 4:18 Bonus track on CD
12. "Work Song" (Nat Adderley, Oscar Brown Jr.) – 4:48 Bonus track on CD
13. "Green Door" (Marvin Moore, Bob Davie) – 4:58 Bonus track on CD

- Recorded live on September 19, 1962 (tracks 3, 5, 7 & 9–11) and October 4, 1964 (tracks 2, 4, 6, 8, 12 & 13)

== Personnel ==
- Cannonball Adderley – alto saxophone
- Ernie Andrews – vocals
- Nat Adderley – cornet
- Joe Zawinul – piano
- Sam Jones – bass
- Louis Hayes – drums

=== Production ===
- Original sessions produced by David Axelrod and Cannonball Adderley
- Reissue produced by Michael Cuscuna
- Wally Heider (1962 recording) and Bill Smith (1964 recording) – recording engineer
- Remastered in 24 bit by Ron McMaster
- Original cover art – Cliff Condak
- Reissue design – Patrick Roques
