= My People (Joe Zawinul album) =

Studio album by Joe Zawinul
- Released: September 1996
- Recorded: 1992–1996
- Genre: World music, jazz
- Length: 52:33
- Label: Escapade Music
- Producer: Ivan Zawinul, Joe Zawinul

Joe Zawinul chronology
| Stories of the Danube (1996) | My People (1996) | World Tour (1998) |

Professional ratings
Review scores
| Source | Rating |
|---|---|
| AllMusic | 4.5/5 stars |
| The Penguin Guide to Jazz | 2/4 stars |

My People is a studio album by Austrian-born jazz musician Joe Zawinul which was recorded and released in 1996.

== Recording and music ==
The album was recorded in 1996. The music draws on several international influences. "The musical structures are linear, the rhythms full of intricacies welded to Zawinul's love affair with the groove, the synthesizer textures usually sparer than ever. There are vocals in several languages".

== Reception ==
The AllMusic reviewer suggested that the album was more world music than jazz, and concluded: "Hear it; you purists may be jiggling along in spite of yourselves." The Penguin Guide to Jazz described it as "hugely disappointing", containing "a drab residue of common riffs, rhythms and disharmonies".

== Track listing ==
1. "Introduction to a Mighty Theme"
2. "Waraya"
3. "Bimoya"
4. "You Want Some Tea, Grandpa?"
5. "Slivovitz Trail"
6. "Ochy-Bala/Pazyryk"
7. "Orient Express"
8. "Erdäpfee Blues (Potato Blues)"
9. "Mi Gente"
10. "In an Island Way"
11. "Many Churches"

== Personnel ==
Musicians

- Joe Zawinul – lead vocals, keyboards, programming
- Bobby Malach – tenor saxophone
- Mike Mossman – trumpet, piccolo, trombone
- Gary Poulson – guitar (tracks 2, 5, 9)
- Osmane Kouyake – guitar (track 3)
- Amit Chatterjee – guitar (5, 7, 9, 11)
- Matt Garrison – bass (tracks 2–3, 5, 8)
- Richard Bona – bass (tracks 6–7)
- Paco Sery – drums, percussion
- Ivan Zawinul – drums programming
- Arto Tuncboyaciyan – percussion
- Souleymane Doumbia – percussion
- Trilok Gurtu – percussion
- Salif Keita – lead vocals

Production

- Joe Zawinul – producer
- Ivan Zawinul – co-producer, mixing
- Joachim Becker – executive producer
- Ted Jensen – mastering
- Arthur Rothstein, Dorothea Lange, Fenno Jacobs, Russell Lee, U.S. FSA Collection – photography
