= Cannonball Adderley's Fiddler on the Roof =

Studio album by Cannonball Adderley
- Released: 1964
- Recorded: October 19 & 21 1964
- Genre: Jazz
- Label: Capitol
- Producer: David Axelrod

Cannonball Adderley chronology
Live Session! (1964)	Cannonball Adderley's Fiddler on the Roof (1964)	Domination (1965)

Cannonball Adderley's Fiddler on the Roof is an album by jazz saxophonist Cannonball Adderley released on the Capitol label featuring performances of material from the Broadway musical Fiddler on the Roof by Adderley with Nat Adderley, Charles Lloyd, Joe Zawinul, Sam Jones and Louis Hayes.

== Reception ==
Professional ratings
Review scores
Source	Rating
Allmusic	4/5 stars
The Penguin Guide to Jazz	3/4 stars

The Allmusic review by Scott Yanow and Tim Sendra awarded the album 4 stars and states "Cannonball plays near his peak; this is certainly the finest album by this particular sextet". The Penguin Guide to Jazz described the album as "not revelatory but very entertaining".

== Track listing ==
All compositions by Jerry Bock & Sheldon Harnick except as indicated

1. "Fiddler on the Roof" - 7:22
2. "To Life" - 5:06
3. "Sabbath Prayer" - 3:19
4. "Chavalah" - 2:56
5. "Sewing Machine" - 3:34
6. "Now I Have Everything" - 4:10
7. "Do You Love Me?" - 5:02
8. "Matchmaker, Matchmaker" - 5:33
9. "Sweet Georgia Bright" (Charles Lloyd) - 5:36 Bonus track on CD reissue
10. "Island Blues" (Lloyd) - 2:24 Bonus track on CD reissue
11. "Little Boy With the Sad Eyes" (Julian "Cannonball" Adderley) - 2:26 Bonus track on CD reissue
12. "Goodbye Charlie" (Dory Langdon, André Previn) - 2:55
- Recorded in New York City, NY on September 8 (tracks 9–12) and October 19 & 21 (all other tracks), 1964
- The spelling of track four for the play is "Chavaleh".

== Personnel ==
- Cannonball Adderley - alto saxophone
- Nat Adderley - cornet
- Charles Lloyd - tenor saxophone, flute
- Joe Zawinul - piano
- Sam Jones - bass
- Louis Hayes - drums
