= The Crawl (Louis Hayes album) =

Live album by Louis Hayes Sextet
- Released: 1990
- Recorded: October 14, 1989
- Venue: Birdland, NYC
- Genre: Jazz
- Length: 66:08
- Label: Candid; CCD 79045
- Producer: Mark Morganelli

Louis Hayes chronology
Light and Lively (1989)	The Crawl (1990)	Una Max (1989)

The Crawl is a live album by the Louis Hayes Sextet, recorded at Birdland in 1989 and released on the Candid label.

== Reception ==
Professional ratings
Review scores
Source	Rating
The Penguin Guide to Jazz Recordings	3.5/4 stars

The AllMusic review stated: "With interesting modal originals to blow on, in addition to a blues and a pair of standards, this live session from 1989 has many memorable moments".

== Track listing ==
1. "Escape Velocity" (Clint Houston) – 6:20
2. "The Crawl" (Mickey Tucker) – 9:21
3. "Yesterdays" (Jerome Kern, Otto Harbach) – 8:42
4. "Run Before the Sun" (Houston) – 10:00
5. "Autumn in New York" (Vernon Duke) – 7:50
6. "Blues in Five Dimensions" (Tucker) – 10:47
7. "Bushman Song" (John Stubblefield) – 13:08

== Personnel ==
- Louis Hayes – drums
- Charles Tolliver – trumpet
- Gary Bartz – alto saxophone
- John Stubblefield – tenor saxophone
- Mickey Tucker – piano
- Clint Houston – bass
