= Nightfall (Louis Hayes album) =

Studio album by Louis Hayes Quintet
- Released: 1991
- Recorded: January 1991
- Studio: New York City
- Genre: Jazz
- Length: 64:02
- Label: SteepleChase; SCCD 31285
- Producer: Nils Winther

Louis Hayes chronology
| Una Max (1989) | Nightfall (1991) | Blue Lou (1993) |

Professional ratings
Review scores
| Source | Rating |
|---|---|
| The Penguin Guide to Jazz Recordings | 3.5/4 stars |

Nightfall is an album led by drummer Louis Hayes which was recorded in 1991 and released on the Danish SteepleChase label.

== Track listing ==
1. "Route 88 East" (Eddie Allen) – 4:36
2. "Sun Showers" (Clint Houston) – 8:35
3. "Nightfall" (Larry Willis) – 7:48
4. "Marie Antoinette" (Wayne Shorter) – 9:13
5. "There's Something About You I Don't Know" (Louis Hayes) – 10:47
6. "André" (John Stubblefield) – 5:51
7. "I Waited for You" (Gil Fuller, Dizzy Gillespie) – 10:30
8. "The Spoiler" (Allen) – 6:21

== Personnel ==
- Louis Hayes – drums
- Eddie Allen – trumpet
- Gerald Hayes – alto saxophone
- Larry Willis – piano
- Clint Houston – bass
