= Variety Is the Spice =

Studio album by The Louis Hayes Group
- Released: 1979
- Recorded: October 9–12, 1978
- Studio: Generation Sound Studios, NYC
- Genre: Jazz
- Label: Gryphon; G 787
- Producer: Norman Schwartz

Louis Hayes chronology
The Real Thing (1977)	Variety Is the Spice (1979)	Light and Lively (1989)

Variety Is the Spice is an album by the Louis Hayes Group recorded in 1978 and released on the Gryphon label.

== Reception ==
Professional ratings
Review scores
Source	Rating
Allmusic	4/5 stars

The Allmusic review called it "Excellent, advanced straight-ahead music".

== Track listing ==
1. "Kelly Colors" (Harold Mabern) – 6:40
2. "Little Sunflower" (Freddie Hubbard, Leon Thomas) – 6:43
3. "Stardust" (Hoagy Carmichael, Mitchell Parish) – 5:11
4. "What's Going On" (Marvin Gaye, Renaldo Benson, Al Cleveland) – 6:00
5. "Invitation" (Bronisław Kaper, Paul Francis Webster – 7:06
6. "Nisha" (Louis Hayes, Thomas) – 5:38
7. "My Favorite Things" (Richard Rodgers, Oscar Hammerstein II) – 4:19
8. "Dance With Me" (Peter Brown, Robert Rans) – 4:54
9. "A Hundred Million Miracles" (Rodgers, Hammerstein) – 4:40

== Personnel ==
- Louis Hayes – drums
- Frank Strozier – alto saxophone, flute
- Harold Mabern – piano, electric piano
- Cecil McBee – bass
- Portinho – percussion
- Titos Sompa – congas
- Leon Thomas – vocals (tracks 2 & 6)
