= Cannonball Adderley and the Poll-Winners =

Studio album by Cannonball Adderley
- Released: Early 1961
- Recorded: May 21, 1960 (#1–3); Fugazi Hall, San Francisco; June 5, 1960 (#4–7); Los Angeles; 1959 (#8–12); Fugazi Hall, San Francisco
- Genre: Jazz
- Length: 39:41 original LP
- Labels: Riverside; RLP 355
- Producer: Orrin Keepnews

Cannonball Adderley chronology
Them Dirty Blues (1960)	Cannonball Adderley and the Poll-Winners (1961)	The Cannonball Adderley Quintet at the Lighthouse (1960)

Cannonball Adderley and the Poll-Winners is an album by jazz saxophonist Julian "Cannonball" Adderley released on the Riverside label, featuring performances by Adderley with Wes Montgomery, Ray Brown, Victor Feldman, and Louis Hayes.

== Reception ==
The contemporaneous DownBeat reviewer praised some of the soloing, but added: "This sounds like a gathering of strangers. No one seems at ease – with the tunes or each other". The AllMusic review by Scott Yanow awarded the album four stars out of five and states "This was the only meeting on records by Adderley and Montgomery and, although not quite a classic encounter, the music swings hard and is quite enjoyable". The Penguin Guide to Jazz awarded the album three and a half stars out of four, stating "The Poll Winners session was a typical all-star meeting of the day, and if it seemed artificial at the time, how good it is to be able to hear, nearly 50 years on, Adderley, Montgomery and Brown in the same band. If there's nothing which could be called surprising, the opportunity to hear these players in their prime is a treat".

Professional ratings
Review scores
Source	Rating
AllMusic	4/5 stars
DownBeat	2.5/5 stars
The Penguin Guide to Jazz	3.5/4 stars

== Track listing ==
1. "The Chant" (Victor Feldman) – 6:36
2. "Lolita" (Barry Harris) – 8:06
3. "Azule Serape" (Feldman) – 6:29
4. "Au Privave" (Charlie Parker) – 3:54
5. "Yours Is My Heart Alone" (Franz Lehár) – 6:04
6. "Never Will I Marry" (Frank Loesser) – 8:32
7. "Au Privave" [Alternate Take] – 4:25 Bonus track on CD

Bonus tracks on the 2011 Essential Jazz Classics CD:

8. "Music in the Air" (Gigi Gryce) – 3:57
9. "Pretty Strange" (Randy Weston) – 2:53
10. "The Shouter" (Gildo Mahones) – 5:03
11. "Social Call" (Gigi Gryce, John Hendricks) – 2:22
12. "Out of the Past" (Benny Golson) – 4:54

== Personnel ==
Tracks #1–7:

- Cannonball Adderley – alto saxophone
- Wes Montgomery – guitar
- Victor Feldman – piano, vibes
- Ray Brown – bass
- Louis Hayes – drums

Tracks #8–12:

- Jon Hendricks – vocals
- Wes Montgomery – guitar
- Cannonball Adderley – alto saxophone
- Nat Adderley – cornet
- Gildo Mahones – piano
- Monk Montgomery – electric bass
- Walter Bolden – drums
