= Money in the Pocket (Cannonball Adderley album) =

Live album by Cannonball Adderley
- Released: August 16, 2005
- Recorded: March 18–20, 1966
- Genre: Jazz
- Label: Capitol
- Producer: Tom Morgan, Michael Cuscuna

Cannonball Adderley chronology
Domination (1965)	Money in the Pocket (2005)	Great Love Themes (1966)

Money in the Pocket is a live album by jazz saxophonist Cannonball Adderley featuring performances by Adderley with Nat Adderley, Joe Zawinul, Herbie Lewis and Roy McCurdy. Recorded at The Club in Chicago in 1966, it was not released on the Capitol label until 2005. However, edited versions of four of the songs were released as singles in 1966: "Money in the Pocket"/"Hear Me Talking to You" on Capitol 5648, and "Sticks"/"Cannon's Theme" on Capitol 5736.

== Reception ==
The Allmusic review by Al Campbell awarded the album 4 stars and states "Cannonball Adderley's mega-successful album Mercy, Mercy, Mercy!, released in August of 1966, was supposedly recorded "live" at a venue in Chicago called The Club, but it was actually recorded in the studio of Capitol Records with a specially assembled audience. For those who wonder what they really sounded like at that venue, Money in the Pocket contains unreleased live recordings of the Cannonball Adderley Quintet at The Club in Chicago... Any Cannonball Adderley fan will want to own this". The Penguin Guide to Jazz awarded the album 3½ stars stating "The sound is rather noisy (especially McCurdy's drums), but if anything this is a warmer set than the 'official' one from later in the year. "Stardust" is a vintage Cannon performance, and "Fiddler on the Roof", all but takes the roof off".

Professional ratings
Review scores
Source	Rating
Allmusic	4/5 stars
The Penguin Guide to Jazz	3.5/4 stars

== Track listing ==
All compositions by Julian "Cannonball" Adderley except as indicated

1. "Money in the Pocket" (Joe Zawinul) – 10:25
2. "Stardust" (Hoagy Carmichael, Mitchell Parish) – 9:09
3. "Introduction to a Samba" – 7:22
4. "Hear Me Talkin' to Ya" (Julian "Cannonball" Adderley, Nat Adderley) – 7:44
5. "Requiem for a Jazz Musician" (Zawinul) – 10:32
6. "Cannon's Theme (a.k.a. Unit 7)" (Sam Jones) – 3:06
7. "The Sticks" – 4:05
8. "Fiddler on the Roof" (Jerry Bock, Sheldon Harnick) – 10:28
- Recorded at The Club in Chicago, IL on 18, 19 & 20, 1966

== Personnel ==
- Cannonball Adderley – alto saxophone
- Nat Adderley – cornet
- Joe Zawinul – piano
- Herbie Lewis – bass
- Roy McCurdy – drums
