= Escape Tour =

1981–82 concert tour by Journey

- Tour by Journey
- Poster to the concert in Nashville, Tennessee
- Location: Japan; North America
- Associated album: Escape
- Start date: July 27, 1981
- End date: July 2, 1982
- Legs: 2
- No. of shows: 132

Journey concert chronology
- Departure Tour (1980); Escape Tour (1981–1982); Frontiers Tour (1983)

The Escape Tour was a concert tour by the American rock band Journey in support of their seventh studio album, Escape.

== Background ==
The tour included six consecutive sold out dates at the Pine Knob Theatre in Detroit, and four straight sold-out shows at the Los Angeles Forum, and Chicago's Rosemont Horizon. Journey also made an appearance on July 2, 1982, at the Rose Bowl in Pasadena, California with Blue Öyster Cult, Triumph and Aldo Nova. The 8 1/2-month tour took Journey through Japan and North America.

Point Blank, Billy Squier, the Greg Kihn Band and Loverboy were the opening acts during the tour.

== Reception ==
Deborah Deasy, a reporter from the Pittsburgh Press, who attended the sold out October 2, 1981 performance, gave criticism toward the band on their deliverance of fast and furious noise, even noting that there was too little 'danceable rock 'n' roll'. The reporter noted on Perry's vocals being grating and overworked, but praised the other members of Journey individually. Deborah cited on the uninspired songwriting and the chemistry, criticizing the band as 'generic rock'. She concluded her review, praising the stage work done by the technical, set and sound designers as well as the surprise fireworks, but also noted on the opening act Point Blank had, criticizing the lackluster lead singer who she claimed was "too impressed with himself". A warmer reception was reported by press in the band's hometown of San Francisco, where Chronicle writer Joel Selvin gushed effusively about the band's video monitors, sound and pyrotechnics, adding that Journey delivered a "masterful triple stroke" that "set a new standard in the rock concert arms race" that makes "all that came before" it, "as old fashioned as a Model T."

== Tour dates ==
Over the course of the tour, Journey played the following dates:

Date	City	Country	Venue	Tickets sold / Available	Revenue
Asia
July 27, 1981	Osaka	Japan	Festival Hall	—N/a	
July 28, 1981	Nagoya	Japan	Kokai-do	—N/a	
July 29, 1981	Tokyo	Japan	Koseinenkin Hall	—N/a	
July 31, 1981	Tokyo	Japan	Koseinenkin Hall	—N/a	
August 1, 1981	Tokyo	Japan	Nakano Sun Plaza	—N/a	
August 2, 1981	Tokyo	Japan	Nakano Sun Plaza	—N/a	
North America
August 15, 1981	Toronto	Canada	Massey Hall	—N/a	
August 22, 1981	Montreal	Canada	Montreal Forum	—N/a	
August 23, 1981	Ottawa	Canada	Ottawa Civic Centre	—N/a	
August 25, 1981	Portland	United States	Cumberland County Civic Center	—N/a	
August 27, 1981	Saratoga Springs	United States	Saratoga Performing Arts Center	—N/a	
August 28, 1981	Columbia	United States	Merriweather Post Pavilion	—N/a	
August 29, 1981	Yarmouth	United States	Cape Cod Coliseum	—N/a	
August 31, 1981	Cuyahoga Falls	United States	Blossom Music Center	—N/a	
September 1, 1981	Cuyahoga Falls	United States	Blossom Music Center	—N/a	
September 3, 1981	Hoffman Estates	United States	Poplar Creek Music Theatre	—N/a	
September 4, 1981	Hoffman Estates	United States	Poplar Creek Music Theatre	—N/a	
September 5, 1981	East Troy	United States	Alpine Valley Music Theatre	—N/a	
September 6, 1981	East Troy	United States	Alpine Valley Music Theatre	—N/a	
September 8, 1981	Clarkston	United States	Pine Knob Music Theatre	—N/a	
September 9, 1981	Clarkston	United States	Pine Knob Music Theatre	—N/a	
September 11, 1981	Clarkston	United States	Pine Knob Music Theatre	—N/a	
September 12, 1981	Clarkston	United States	Pine Knob Music Theatre	—N/a	
September 13, 1981	Clarkston	United States	Pine Knob Music Theatre	—N/a	
September 14, 1981	Clarkston	United States	Pine Knob Music Theatre	—N/a	
September 15, 1981	St. Paul	United States	St. Paul Civic Center	—N/a	
September 16, 1981	Ames	United States	Hilton Coliseum	—N/a	
September 18, 1981	Kansas City	United States	Kemper Arena	31,373 / 34,331	$316,591
September 19, 1981	Kansas City	United States	Kemper Arena	31,373 / 34,331	$316,591
September 20, 1981	Wichita	United States	Levitt Arena	10,500 / 10,500	$105,000
September 21, 1981	Omaha	United States	Omaha Civic Auditorium	12,000 / 12,000	$114,000
September 23, 1981	St. Louis	United States	Checkerdome	17,517 / 17,517	$172,206
September 28, 1981	Terre Haute	United States	Hulman Center		
September 29, 1981	Rosemont	United States	Rosemont Horizon		
September 30, 1981	Champaign	United States	Assembly Hall		
October 1, 1981	Cincinnati	United States	Riverfront Coliseum		
October 2, 1981	Pittsburgh	United States	Civic Arena		
October 3, 1981	Lexington	United States	Rupp Arena	17,652 / 17,652	$179,726
October 6, 1981	Boston	United States	Boston Garden		
October 8, 1981	Hartford	United States	Hartford Civic Center	16,198 / 16,198	$171,975
October 9, 1981	Syracuse	United States	Carrier Dome		
October 10, 1981	Uniondale	United States	Nassau Veterans Memorial Coliseum		
October 11, 1981	Providence	United States	Providence Civic Center		
October 12, 1981	Philadelphia	United States	The Spectrum		
October 13, 1981	Hampton	United States	Hampton Coliseum		
October 15, 1981	Jacksonville	United States	Veterans Memorial Coliseum	11,512 / 11,512	$114,530
October 16, 1981	Birmingham	United States	BJCC Coliseum		
October 17, 1981	Atlanta	United States	Omni Coliseum		
October 18, 1981	Columbia	United States	Carolina Coliseum		
October 20, 1981	Charlotte	United States	Charlotte Coliseum		
October 21, 1981	Savannah	United States	Martin Luther King Jr. Arena		
October 22, 1981	Lakeland	United States	Jenkins Arena	20,000 / 20,000	$199,318
October 23, 1981	Lakeland	United States	Jenkins Arena	20,000 / 20,000	$199,318
October 24, 1981	Pembroke Pines	United States	Hollywood Sportatorium		
October 27, 1981	Knoxville	United States	Knoxville Civic Coliseum		
October 28, 1981	Nashville	United States	Municipal Auditorium	9,900 / 9,900	$98,460
October 30, 1981	Memphis	United States	Mid-South Coliseum	11,632 / 11,632	$122,136
October 31, 1981	Mobile	United States	Municipal Auditorium		
November 1, 1981	Baton Rouge	United States	LSU Assembly Center		
November 3, 1981	Oklahoma City	United States	Myriad Convention Center	14,735 / 14,735	$159,357
November 5, 1981	Houston	United States	The Summit	34,904 / 34,904	$377,577
November 6, 1981	Houston	United States	The Summit	34,904 / 34,904	$377,577
November 7, 1981	Dallas	United States	Reunion Arena	38,025 / 38,025	$453,719
November 8, 1981	Dallas	United States	Reunion Arena	38,025 / 38,025	$453,719
November 10, 1981	Albuquerque	United States	Tingley Coliseum		
November 11, 1981	Amarillo	United States	Cal Farley Coliseum		
November 13, 1981	Las Cruces	United States	Pan American Center		
November 14, 1981	Tucson	United States	Tucson Arena		
November 15, 1981	Phoenix	United States	Arizona Veterans Memorial Coliseum		
November 21, 1981	San Diego	United States	San Diego Sports Arena		
November 22, 1981	Inglewood	United States	The Forum	70,000 / 70,000	$729,018
November 23, 1981	Inglewood	United States	The Forum	70,000 / 70,000	$729,018
November 24, 1981	Inglewood	United States	The Forum	70,000 / 70,000	$729,018
November 25, 1981	Inglewood	United States	The Forum	70,000 / 70,000	$729,018
November 29, 1981	Fresno	United States	Ratcliffe Stadium		
November 30, 1981	Daly City	United States	Cow Palace	41,710 / 41,710	$443,346 (Note: Proceeds from the December 2 concert were donated to the restoration of the San Francisco cable car system.)
December 1, 1981	Daly City	United States	Cow Palace	41,710 / 41,710	$443,346
December 2, 1981	Daly City	United States	Cow Palace	41,710 / 41,710	$443,346
December 3, 1981	Pocatello	United States	Minidome		
December 4, 1981	Seattle	United States	Seattle Center Coliseum	44,910 / 44,910	$538,920
December 5, 1981	Seattle	United States	Seattle Center Coliseum	44,910 / 44,910	$538,920
December 6, 1981	Seattle	United States	Seattle Center Coliseum	44,910 / 44,910	$538,920
December 7, 1981	Portland	United States	Memorial Coliseum		
December 8, 1981	Portland	United States	Memorial Coliseum		
December 10, 1981	Oakland	United States	Oakland–Alameda County Coliseum		
December 11, 1981	Daly City	United States	Cow Palace		
December 12, 1981	Daly City	United States	Cow Palace		
December 21, 1981	Honolulu	United States	Neal S. Blaisdell Arena		
December 22, 1981	Honolulu	United States	Neal S. Blaisdell Arena		
Asia
April 9, 1982	Fukuoka	Japan	Sun Palace Hall		
April 11, 1982	Kyoto	Japan	Kyoto Kaikan		
April 12, 1982	Osaka	Japan	Festival Hall		
April 13, 1982	Osaka	Japan	Osaka Prefectural Gymnasium		
April 14, 1982	Nagoya	Japan	Aichi Prefectural Gymnasium		
April 16, 1982	Tokyo	Japan	Nippon Budokan		
April 17, 1982	Yokohama	Japan	Yokohama Cultural Gymnasium		
North America
April 23, 1982	Vancouver	Canada	Pacific Coliseum		
April 25, 1982	Edmonton	Canada	Northlands Coliseum	17,178 / 18,117	$214,787
April 26, 1982	Calgary	Canada	Stampede Corral	7,500 / 7,500	$101,105
April 28, 1982	Winnipeg	Canada	Winnipeg Arena	14,646 / 17,230	$172,116
April 30, 1982	Toronto	Canada	Maple Leaf Gardens	12,792 / 19,307	$151,146
May 1, 1982	Buffalo	United States	Memorial Auditorium	17,293 / 17,293	$176,046
May 3, 1982	Boston	United States	Boston Garden	31,000 / 31,000	$371,242
May 4, 1982	Boston	United States	Boston Garden	31,000 / 31,000	$371,242
May 6, 1982	East Rutherford	United States	Brendan Byrne Arena	41,224 / 41,224	$482,646
May 7, 1982	East Rutherford	United States	Brendan Byrne Arena	41,224 / 41,224	$482,646
May 8, 1982	Landover	United States	Capital Centre	18,896 / 18,896	$200,109
May 10, 1982	Philadelphia	United States	The Spectrum	37,226 / 37,226	$441,203
May 11, 1982	Philadelphia	United States	The Spectrum	37,226 / 37,226	$441,203
May 13, 1982	Richfield	United States	Richfield Coliseum	37,221 / 37,221	$465,262
May 14, 1982	Richfield	United States	Richfield Coliseum	37,221 / 37,221	$465,262
May 15, 1982	Detroit	United States	Joe Louis Arena	39,900 / 39,900	$461,316
May 16, 1982	Detroit	United States	Joe Louis Arena	39,900 / 39,900	$461,316
May 18, 1982	Louisville	United States	Freedom Hall	19,400 / 19,400	$217,548
May 19, 1982	Indianapolis	United States	Market Square Arena	18,178 / 18,178	$197,945
May 21, 1982	Rosemont	United States	Rosemont Horizon	73,080 / 73,080	$865,833
May 22, 1982	Rosemont	United States	Rosemont Horizon	73,080 / 73,080	$865,833
May 23, 1982	Rosemont	United States	Rosemont Horizon	73,080 / 73,080	$865,833
May 24, 1982	Rosemont	United States	Rosemont Horizon	73,080 / 73,080	$865,833
May 27, 1982	Denver	United States	McNichols Arena	33,900 / 36,000	$424,301
May 28, 1982	Denver	United States	McNichols Arena	33,900 / 36,000	$424,301
May 29, 1982	Salt Lake City	United States	Salt Palace	26,259 / 26,318	$244,222
May 30, 1982	Salt Lake City	United States	Salt Palace	26,259 / 26,318	$244,222
June 2, 1982	Portland	United States	Memorial Coliseum		
June 3, 1982	Portland	United States	Memorial Coliseum		
June 4, 1982	Portland	United States	Memorial Coliseum		
June 12, 1982	Dallas	United States	Cotton Bowl	64,945 / 70,000	$1,199,310
June 13, 1982	Houston	United States	Astrodome	65,000 / 65,000	$1,160,504
June 26, 1982	Oakland	United States	Oakland–Alameda County Coliseum	57,500 / 57,500	$957,851
July 2, 1982	Pasadena	United States	Rose Bowl	83,214 / 90,000	$1,373,031

== Personnel ==
- Steve Perry – lead vocals, keyboards, piano
- Neal Schon – lead guitar, backing vocals
- Ross Valory – bass, backing vocals
- Jonathan Cain – keyboards, piano, rhythm guitar, backing vocals
- Steve Smith – drums, percussion
