= Jazz Workshop =

Jazz music nightclub in San Francisco

Coordinates: 37.79790°N 122.40492°W

The Jazz Workshop was a jazz music nightclub in San Francisco, located in North Beach at 473 Broadway Street. Numerous live recordings were made there, during its heyday in the 1960s. As of 2016, the space is occupied by a bar and music venue called "Monroe".

== Albums ==
- Jazz Workshop Revisited Cannonball Adderley (Riverside 1963)
- Live at the Jazz Workshop Thelonious Monk (Columbia 1964)
- Barry Harris at the Jazz Workshop (Riverside 1960)
- Right Now: Live at the Jazz Workshop Charles Mingus (Debut 1964)
- Brother Jack at the Jazz Workshop Live! Jack McDuff (Prestige 1964)
- Naked City Theme Ahmad Jamal (Argo 1964)
- Cookin' the Blues James Moody (Cadet 1965)
- Inta Somethin' Kenny Dorham (Pacific Jazz 1962)
- Speak, Brother, Speak! Max Roach (Fantasy 1963)
- The Cannonball Adderley Quintet in San Francisco (Riverside 1959)
- Les McCann Ltd. in San Francisco Les McCann (Pacific Jazz 1961)
