= Money in the Pocket (Joe Zawinul album) =

Studio album by Joe Zawinul
- Released: April 1966
- Recorded: February 7, 1966
- Studio: Atlantic Studios, NYC
- Genre: Jazz
- Length: 38:33
- Label: Atlantic; SD 3004
- Producer: Joel Dorn

Joe Zawinul chronology
| Soulmates (1963) | Money in the Pocket (1966) | The Rise and Fall of the Third Stream (1968) |

Money in the Pocket is the debut studio album led by jazz fusion keyboardist Joe Zawinul released on the Atlantic label in 1966.

== Reception ==
Professional ratings
Review scores
| Source | Rating |
|---|---|
| Allmusic | 3/5 stars |
| All About Jazz | 3.5/4 stars |
| The Guardian | 3/5 stars |

The Allmusic review awarded the album 3 stars. All About Jazz awarded the album 3½ stars, stating, "Money In The Pocket is a remarkable album—remarkable in that it gives absolutely no hint of the shape shifts that would transform Zawinul's work a few years later. The first of three albums he recorded for Atlantic, it's a conventional mix of mid-1960s hard bop and soul jazz". The Guardian's John Fordham noted, "this session reflects the driving grooves of that popular soul-jazz style – so there are a lot of backbeats, repeating riffs, horn-harmony wailing and stagey stop-time breaks".

== Track listing ==
All compositions by Joe Zawinul except as indicated

1. "Money in the Pocket" - 4:46
2. "If" (Joe Henderson) - 3:47
3. "My One and Only Love" (Guy Wood, Robert Mellin) - 3:52
4. "Midnight Mood" - 6:06
5. "Some More of Dat" (Sam Jones) - 6:02
6. "Sharon's Waltz" (Rudy Stevenson) - 5:06
7. "Riverbed" - 5:09
8. "Del Sasser" (Jones) - 3:45

== Personnel ==
- Joe Zawinul – piano
- Blue Mitchell – trumpet (tracks 1, 2, 4, 5 & 7)
- Clifford Jordan (track 1) – tenor saxophone
- Joe Henderson (tracks 2, 4, 5 & 7) – tenor saxophone
- Pepper Adams (tracks 2, 4, 5 & 7) – baritone saxophone
- Bob Cranshaw (track 1) – bass
- Sam Jones (tracks 2 & 4–8) – bass
- Roy McCurdy (track 1) – drums
- Louis Hayes (tracks 2 & 4–8) – drums
