= Cannonball Adderley Live! =

Live album by Cannonball Adderley
- Released: 1964
- Recorded: July 31–August 2, 1964
- Genre: Jazz
- Label: Capitol
- Producer: David Axelrod

Cannonball Adderley chronology
The Sextet (1962-63)	Cannonball Adderley Live! (1964)	Live Session! (1964)

Cannonball Adderley Live! is a live album by jazz saxophonist Cannonball Adderley recorded at Shelly's Manne-Hole and released on the Capitol label featuring performances by Adderley with Nat Adderley, Charles Lloyd, Joe Zawinul, Sam Jones and Louis Hayes.

== Reception ==
The Allmusic review by Scott Yanow awarded the album 3 (out of 5) stars and states: "When Riverside Records went into bankruptcy, Adderley signed with Capitol, a label whose interest in jazz ... tended to be short-lived. As a result, Cannonball's recordings would become more commercial as the 1960s developed but this early Capitol effort is quite good. Charles Lloyd had just joined Adderley's Sextet and his tenor and flute were major assets".

Professional ratings
Review scores
Source	Rating
Allmusic	3/5 stars
The Rolling Stone Jazz Record Guide	3/5 stars

== Track listing ==
1. "Little Boy With Sad Eyes" (Nat Adderley) - 12:35
2. "Work Song" (Nat Adderley) - 8:30
3. "Sweet Georgia Bright (Charles Lloyd) - 6:25
4. "The Song My Lady Sings" (Charles Lloyd) - 15:05
5. "Theme" (Sam Jones) - 1:10
  - Recorded live at Shelly's Manne-Hole, Los Angeles, July 31, August 1 & 2 1964

== Personnel ==
- Cannonball Adderley - alto saxophone
- Nat Adderley - cornet
- Charles Lloyd - tenor saxophone, flute
- Joe Zawinul - piano
- Sam Jones - bass
- Louis Hayes - drums
