= Louis Hayes =

American jazz drummer and band leader (born 1937)

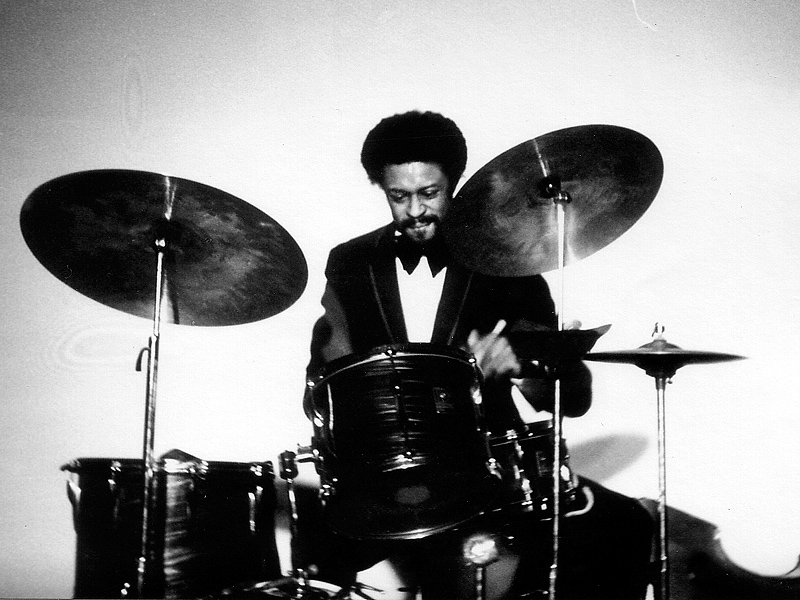
- Hayes in 1971

Background information
- Born: May 31, 1937 (age 88); Detroit, Michigan, U.S.
- Genres: Jazz
- Occupation: Musician
- Instrument: Drums
- Years active: 1950s–present
- Website: louishayes.net

Louis Hayes (born May 31, 1937) is an American jazz drummer and band leader. He was with McCoy Tyner's trio for more than three years. Since 1989 he has led his own band, and together with Vincent Herring formed the Cannonball Legacy Band. He is part of the NEA Jazz Masters awards class of 2023.

== Biography ==
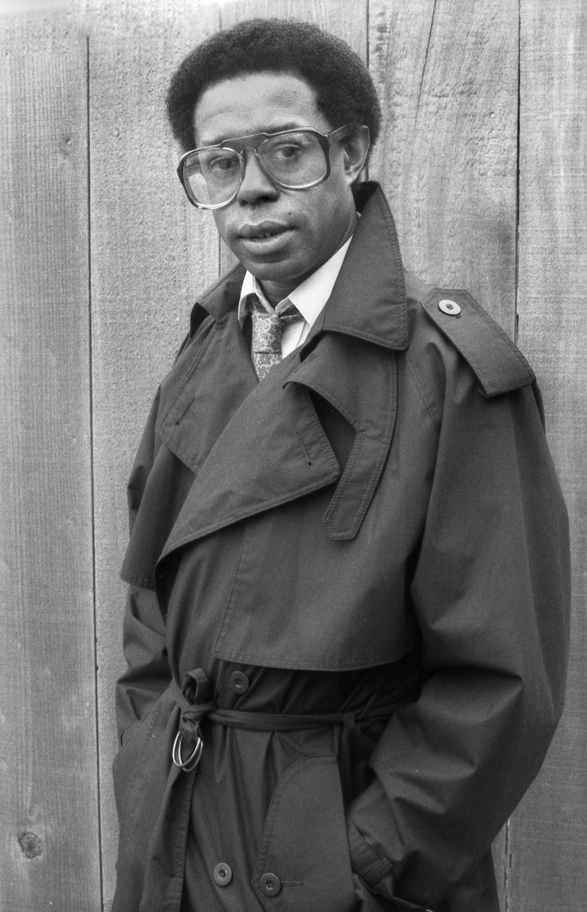
Louis Hayes in 1986

Louis Sedell Hayes was born in Detroit, Michigan, United States, to a father, an automaker, who played drums and piano. His mother waited tables and played the piano. She was the sister of John L. Nelson, the father of the musician Prince. Hayes got his first drum set at age 10. The key influence in his early development was his cousin Clarence Stamps, an accomplished drummer who grounded his technical fundamentals and gave him lessons that stuck for life. He refers to the early influence of hearing jazz, especially big bands on the radio. His main influence was Philly Joe Jones and he was mentored by Jo Jones. His three main associations were with Horace Silver's Quintet (1956–59), the Cannonball Adderley Quintet (1959–1965), and the Oscar Peterson Trio (1965–1967). Hayes often joined Sam Jones, both with Adderley and Peterson, and in freelance settings.

When he was a teenager, he led a band in Detroit clubs before he was 16. He worked with Yusef Lateef and Curtis Fuller from 1955 to 1956. He moved to New York in August 1956, to replace Art Taylor in the Horace Silver Quintet and, in 1959, joined the Cannonball Adderley Quintet, with which he remained until mid-1965, when he succeeded Ed Thigpen in the Oscar Peterson Trio. He left Peterson in 1967, and formed a series of groups, which he led alone or with others; among his sidemen were Freddie Hubbard, Joe Henderson, Kenny Barron, and James Spaulding. He returned to Peterson in 1971.

The Louis Hayes Sextet, formed in 1972, became, in 1975, the Louis Hayes-Junior Cook Quintet and the Woody Shaw-Louis Hayes Quintet (Cook remained as a sideman until Rene McLean joined); in its last form the quintet played successful engagements throughout Europe and (without McLean) acted as the host group when, in 1976, Dexter Gordon visited the U.S. for the first time in many years. After Shaw left the group in 1977, Hayes continued to lead it as a hard-bop quintet.

Hayes has appeared on many records throughout the years, and played with John Coltrane, Kenny Burrell, Freddie Hubbard, Bobby Timmons, Hank Mobley, Booker Little, Tommy Flanagan, Cecil Taylor, McCoy Tyner, Ray Brown, Joe Henderson, Gary Bartz, and Tony Williams. He also led sessions for Timeless (1976), Muse (1977), Candid (1989), Steeplechase (1989–1994), and TCB (2000–2002).

He was with McCoy Tyner's trio for more than three years. Since 1989 he has led his own band, and together with Vincent Herring formed the Cannonball Legacy Band.

== Discography ==
=== As leader/co-leader ===
- Louis Hayes (Vee-Jay, 1960)
- Breath of Life (Muse, 1974)
- Ichi-Ban with Junior Cook (Timeless, 1976)
- The Real Thing (Muse, 1978) – recorded in 1977
- Variety Is the Spice (Gryphon, 1979) – recorded in 1978
- Light and Lively (SteepleChase, 1989)
- The Crawl (Candid, 1989)
- Una Max (SteepleChase, 1990) – live recorded in 1989
- Nightfall (SteepleChase, 1991)
- Blue Lou (SteepleChase, 1993)
- The Super Quartet (Timeless, 1994)
- Louis at Large (Sharp Nine, 1996)
- Quintessential Lou (TCB, 2000)
- The Candy Man (TCB, 2001)
- Dreamin' of Cannonball (TCB, 2002)
- Maximum Firepower (Savant, 2006)
- The Time Keeper (18th & Vine, 2009) – recorded in 2008
- Live At Cory Weeds' Cellar Jazz Club (Cellar Live, 2014) – recorded in 2013
- Return of the Jazz Communicators (Smoke Sessions, 2014)
- Serenade for Horace (Blue Note, 2017)
- Crisis (Savant, 2021)
- Exactly Right! (Savant, 2023)
- Artform Revisited (Savant, 2024)

=== As sideman ===
With Cannonball Adderley

- In San Francisco (1959, Riverside) – live
- Them Dirty Blues (Riverside, 1960)
- The Cannonball Adderley Quintet at the Lighthouse (Riverside, 1960) – live
- Cannonball Adderley and the Poll-Winners (Riverside, 1961) – recorded in 1959-60
- African Waltz (Riverside, 1961)
- Plus (Riverside, 1961)
- Nancy Wilson / Cannonball Adderley (Capitol, 1961)
- Cannonball in Europe! (Riverside, 1962) – live
- Jazz Workshop Revisited (Riverside, 1962) – live
- Nippon Soul (Riverside, 1964) – live recorded in 1963
- Autumn Leaves (Riverside, 1963)
- The Cannonball Adderley Sextet in New York (Riverside, 1964)
- Cannonball Adderley Live! (Capitol, 1964)
- Live Session! (Capitol, 1964)
- Cannonball Adderley's Fiddler on the Roof (Capitol, 1964)
- Domination (Capitol, 1965)
- Phenix (Fantasy, 1975)
- The Sextet (Milestone, 1982) – recorded in 1962-63

With Nat Adderley

- Work Song (Riverside, 1960)
- Naturally! (Jazzland, 1961)

With Kenny Burrell

- K. B. Blues (Blue Note, 1979) – recorded in 1957
- Bluesin' Around (Columbia, 1983) – recorded in 1961

With Al Cohn

- Son of Drum Suite (RCA Victor, 1961) – recorded in 1960
- True Blue with Dexter Gordon (Xanadu, 1976)
- Silver Blue with Dexter Gordon (Xanadu, 1976)

With John Coltrane

- Coltrane Time (United Artists, Blue Note, 1959) – recorded in 1958
- Lush Life (Prestige, 1961) – recorded in 1957-58
- The Believer (Prestige, 1963)
- The Last Trane (Prestige, 1966) – recorded in 1957-58

With Tommy Flanagan, John Coltrane, Kenny Burrell, and Idrees Sulieman

- The Cats (Prestige, 1957)

With Curtis Fuller

- New Trombone (Prestige, 1957)
- Jazz ...It's Magic! (Regent, 1958) – recorded in 1957
- Curtis Fuller Volume 3 (Blue Note, 1961) – recorded in 1957
- Curtis Fuller with Red Garland (New Jazz, 1962) – recorded in 1957

With Dexter Gordon

- Ca'Purange (Prestige, 1973) – recorded in 1972
- Tangerine (Prestige, 1975) – recorded in 1972

With Grant Green

- Gooden's Corner (Blue Note, 1961)
- Oleo (Blue Note, 1962)
- Born to Be Blue (Blue Note, 1962)

With Joe Henderson

- The Kicker (Milestone, 1967)
- Tetragon (Milestone, 1968)

With John Hicks

- Gentle Rain (Sound Hills, 1994)
- On the Wings of an Eagle (Chesky, 2006)

With Freddie Hubbard

- The Artistry of Freddie Hubbard (Impulse!, 1962)
- The Body & the Soul (Impulse!,1963)
- The Hub of Hubbard (MPS, 1970)

With Sam Jones

- The Soul Society (Riverside, 1960)
- The Chant (Riverside, 1961)
- Changes & Things (Xanadu, 1977)
- Something in Common (Muse, 1977)

With Clifford Jordan

- Cliff Craft (Blue Note, 1957)
- Inward Fire (Muse, 1978) – recorded in 1977

With Yusef Lateef

- Jazz for the Thinker (Savoy, 1957)
- Stable Mates (Savoy, 1957)
- Jazz Mood (Savoy, 1957)
- Before Dawn: The Music of Yusef Lateef (Verve, 1958) – recorded in 1957

With Jackie McLean

- Strange Blues (Prestige, 1957)
- Makin' the Changes (New Jazz, 1960) – recorded in 1957

With Phineas Newborn, Jr.

- A World of Piano! (Contemporary, 1962) – recorded in 1961
- The Great Jazz Piano of Phineas Newborn Jr. (Contemporary, 1963) – recorded in 1962-63

With Horace Silver

- 6 Pieces of Silver (Blue Note, 1957) – recorded in 1956
- The Stylings of Silver (Blue Note, 1957)
- Further Explorations by the Horace Silver Quintet (Blue Note, 1958)
- Finger Poppin' with the Horace Silver Quintet (Blue Note, 1959)
- Blowin' the Blues Away (Blue Note, 1959)

With James Spaulding

- Songs of Courage (Muse, 1993) – recorded in 1991
- Blues Nexus (Muse, 1994) – recorded in 1993

With Lucky Thompson

- Concert: Friday the 13th - Cook County Jail (Groove Merchant, 1973)
- I Offer You (Groove Merchant, 1973)

With Cedar Walton

- A Night At Boomers, Vol. 1 (Muse, 1973) – live
- A Night At Boomers, Vol. 2 (Muse, 1973) – live
- Firm Roots (Muse, 1976) – recorded in 1974

With others

- Pepper Adams, Conjuration: Fat Tuesday's Session (Reservoir, 1990) – recorded in 1983
- Gene Ammons, Goodbye (Prestige, 1974)
- Georges Arvanitas, Cocktail for Three (Pretoria, 1959)
- James Clay, A Double Dose of Soul (Riverside, 1960)
- Richard Davis, Muses for Richard Davis (MPS, 1969)
- Kenny Drew, Undercurrent (Blue Note, 1960)
- Victor Feldman, Merry Olde Soul (Riverside, 1961)
- Ricky Ford,Tenor Madness Too! (Muse, 1992)
- Terry Gibbs, Take It from Me (Impulse!, 1964)
- Bennie Green, Back on the Scene (Blue Note, 1958)
- Wilbur Harden, Mainstream 1958 (Savoy, 1958)
- Barry Harris, Barry Harris at the Jazz Workshop (Riverside, 1960)
- Johnny Hodges, Blue Hodge (Verve, 1961)
- J. J. Johnson, A Touch of Satin (Columbia, 1962)
- Harold Land, West Coast Blues! (Jazzland, 1960)
- Johnny Lytle, Nice and Easy (Jazzland, 1962)
- Ken McIntyre, Year of the Iron Sheep (United Artists, 1962)
- Wes Montgomery, Movin' Along (Riverside, 1960)
- Lee Morgan, Take Twelve (Jazzland, 1962)
- David "Fathead" Newman,Resurgence! (Muse, 1981)
- Freddie Redd, Shades of Redd (Blue Note, 1960)
- Woody Shaw, The Woody Shaw Concert Ensemble at the Berliner Jazztage (Muse, 1976)
- Les Spann, Gemini (Jazzland, 1961) – recorded in 1960
- Sonny Stitt, 12! (Muse, 1972)
- Idrees Sulieman, Roots with the Prestige All Stars (New Jazz, 1958)
- McCoy Tyner, Uptown/Downtown (Milestone, 1988)
- Eddie "Cleanhead" Vinson, Back Door Blues (Riverside, 1962)
- Roosevelt Wardell, The Revelation (Prestige, 1960)
- Phil Woods, Four Altos with Gene Quill, Sahib Shihab, and Hal Stein (Prestige, 1957)
- The Young Lions, The Young Lions (Vee-Jay, 1961) – recorded in 1960
- Joe Zawinul, Money in the Pocket (Atlantic, 1966)
