= Jazz Workshop Revisited =

Live album by Cannonball Adderley
- Released: 1962
- Recorded: September 22–23, 1962
- Venue: Jazz Workshop, San Francisco, CA
- Genre: Jazz
- Label: Riverside
- Producer: Orrin Keepnews

Cannonball Adderley chronology
Cannonball in Europe! (1962)	Jazz Workshop Revisited (1962)	Cannonball's Bossa Nova (1962)

Professional ratings
Review scores
Source	Rating
AllMusic	4/5 stars
DownBeat	4.5/5 stars
The Penguin Guide to Jazz	3/4 stars

Jazz Workshop Revisited is a live album by the jazz saxophonist Cannonball Adderley released on the Riverside label. Alongside Adderley, it features performances by Nat Adderley, Yusef Lateef, Joe Zawinul, Sam Jones and Louis Hayes. It was recorded at the Jazz Workshop in San Francisco on September 22 & 23, 1962.

== Chart performance ==
The album entered the charts in 1962, but peaked at No. 11 on the Billboard Top LPs, in 1963. It stayed on the chart for 25 weeks.

== Reception ==
In his review in the May 9, 1963, issue of DownBeat magazine, the jazz critic Pete Welding wrote: "Spurred on by an appreciative audience present during the recording, the Adderley group has produced a collection that is both stimulating and accessible. There is plenty of good, strong blowing, and to this is added the interest of artful, well-constructed arrangements that enhance the tunes and strengthen the solos."

The AllMusic review by Scott Yanow awarded the album 4 stars, stating: "Adderley's greatest band -- a sextet with cornetist Nat Adderley, Yusef Lateef (on tenor, flute and oboe), pianist Joe Zawinul, bassist Sam Jones, and drummer Louis Hayes -- is featured on such exciting numbers as 'Jessica's Day', Jones' 'Unit 7', and 'The Jive Samba'. A special treat of this live date is hearing the leader's introductory words to several of the songs." The Penguin Guide to Jazz awarded the album 3 stars, writing that "on favourite turf in San Francisco, the band are in good fettle."

== Track listing ==
1. An opening comment or two by Cannonball... – 0:51
2. "Primitivo" (Julian "Cannonball" Adderley) – 9:13
3. "Jessica's Day" (Quincy Jones) – 6:30
4. "Marney" (Donald Byrd) – 6:52
5. Talk – 0:13
6. "Unit Seven" (Sam Jones) – 9:02 Bonus track on CD
7. Another few words... – 0:26
8. "Jive Samba" (Nat Adderley) – 11:00
9. "Lillie" (Jones) – 4:41
10. "Mellow Buno" (Yusef Lateef) – 6:00
11. Time to go now... really! – 0:36

== Personnel ==
- Cannonball Adderley – alto saxophone
- Nat Adderley – cornet
- Yusef Lateef – tenor saxophone, flute, oboe
- Joe Zawinul – piano
- Sam Jones – double bass
- Louis Hayes – drums

== Charts ==
Chart (1962–1963)	Peak position
US Billboard Top LPs	11
