= Mercy, Mercy, Mercy! Live at "The Club" =

Live album by Cannonball Adderley
- Released: February 1967
- Recorded: October 20, 1966
- Studio: Capitol (Hollywood)
- Genres: Hard bop; soul jazz
- Length: 41:07
- Label: Capitol
- Producer: David Axelrod

Cannonball Adderley chronology
Cannonball in Japan (1966)	Mercy, Mercy, Mercy! Live at "The Club" (1967)	74 Miles Away (1967)

Mercy, Mercy, Mercy! Live at "The Club" is a 1967 live in-studio album by The Cannonball Adderley Quintet, the jazz group formed by musician Cannonball Adderley. It received the Grammy Award for Best Instrumental Jazz Performance – Group or Soloist with Group in 1968, and was added to the Grammy Hall of Fame in 2021.

Though the original liner notes state that it was recorded at the Club DeLisa in Chicago, it was actually recorded at Capitol's Hollywood studio with an invited audience and an open bar. The reason for this discrepancy, according to the liner notes in the CD reissue, is that Adderley and the new manager of Club DeLisa (which had been renamed "The Club", after operating for years in Chicago under its old name) were friends, and Adderley offered to give the club a bit of free publicity.

The title track became a surprise hit, reaching No. 11 on the Billboard's Hot 100. The album reached No. 13 on the Top LPs chart. On this album, Joe Zawinul played a Wurlitzer electric piano; however, subsequent live performances saw him taking up the new and mellower-sounding Fender Rhodes instrument.

The track "Hippodelphia" is sometimes mis-spelt "Hipadelphia" on other recordings. The track listing for the album uses "Hippodelphia", while the liner notes, written by E. Rodney Jones, for the same album refer to "Hipadelphia".

== Reception ==
The Allmusic review by Steve Huey awarded the album 5 stars and states: "Adderley's irrepressible exuberance was a major part of his popularity, and no document captures that quality as well—or with such tremendous musical rewards—as Mercy, Mercy, Mercy." The Penguin Guide to Jazz awarded the album 3 out of 4 stars, stating: "Mercy, Mercy, Mercy is a hard swinging live album with one of Cannon's hottest outings on 'Sticks'.".

Professional ratings
Review scores
Source	Rating
Allmusic	5/5 stars
DownBeat	4/5 stars
The Penguin Guide to Jazz	3/4 stars
The Rolling Stone Jazz Record Guide	5/5 stars

== Track listing ==
1. "Fun" (Nat Adderley) – 8:26
2. "Games" (N. Adderley) – 7:19
3. "Mercy, Mercy, Mercy" (Joe Zawinul) – 5:10
4. "Sticks" (Cannonball Adderley) – 3:54
5. "Hippodelphia" (Zawinul) – 5:49
6. "Sack O' Woe" (C. Adderley) – 10:29

== Personnel ==
- Cannonball Adderley – alto saxophone, leader
- Nat Adderley – cornet
- Joe Zawinul – piano, Wurlitzer electric piano
- Victor Gaskin – bass
- Roy McCurdy – drums

== Charts ==
Chart (1967)	Peak position
US Billboard Top LPs	13

== See also ==
- List of number-one R&B albums of 1967 (U.S.)
