= Linzer Klangwolke =

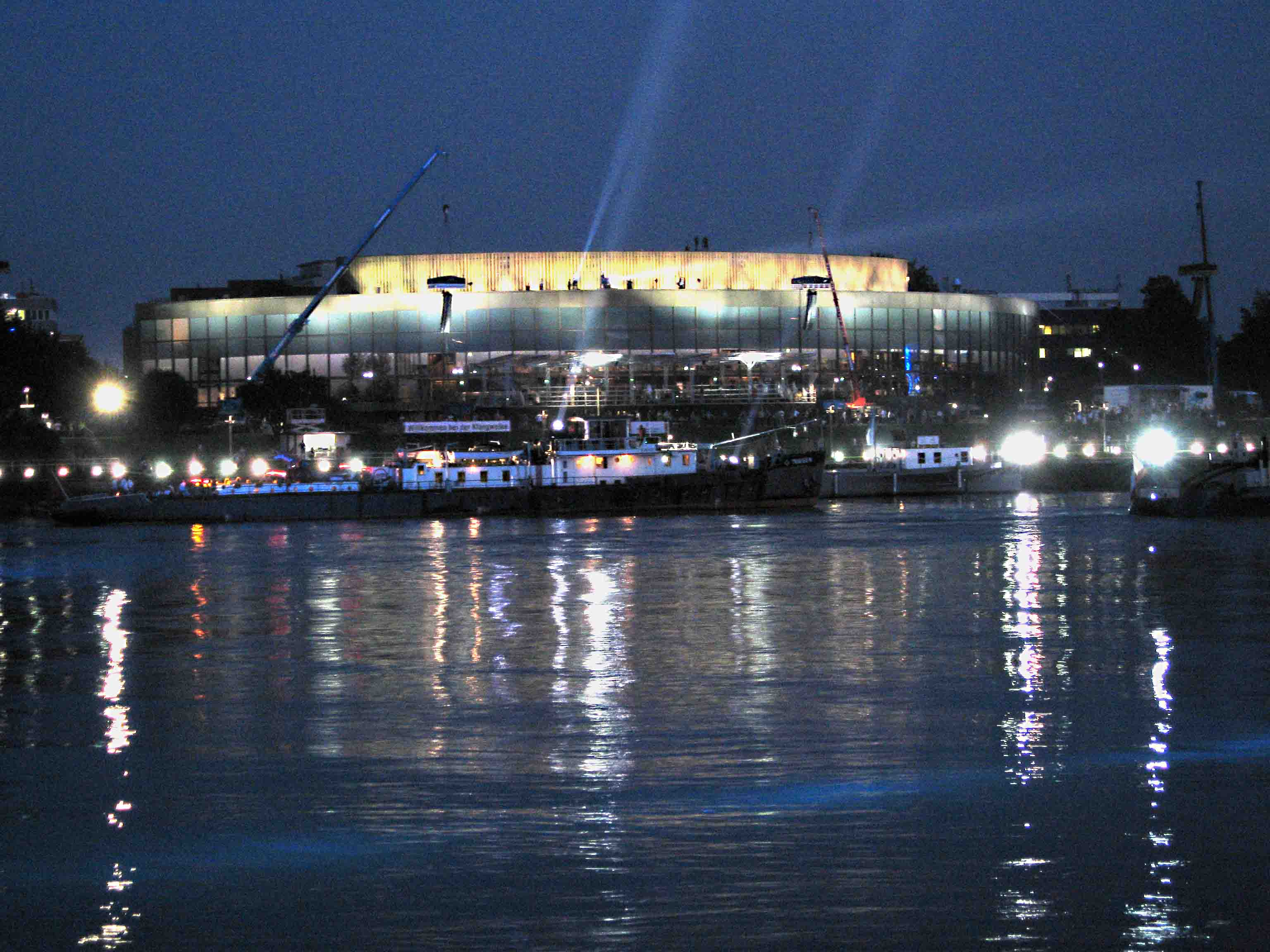
The Brucknerhaus during the 2005 Linzer Klangwolke.

The Linzer Klangwolke (German pronunciation: [ˈlɪnʦɐ ˈklaŋˌvɔlkə]) (Linz Cloud of Sound) is an open-air multimedia musical event held each year since 1979 in early September in the Linz Danube Park in the Austrian town of Linz. It is organized by the Brucknerhaus Linz.

The Cloud of Sound currently consists of three concerts of modern music, partially supplemented by visualizations. The series starts with the visualized Cloud of Sound, in which modern music (mostly commissioned works) is staged with lasers, video projections, fireworks, ships, cranes, balloons, etc. This event attracts an audience of about 100,000 each year and is one of the largest European open-air events with no admission. The classic Cloud of Sound is a classical concert at the Great Hall of the Brucknerhaus Linz, performed without visualization. The children's Cloud of Sound, an afternoon event since 1998, provides musical stories for younger listeners. All three Cloud of Sounds are part of the Brucknerfest.

== History ==
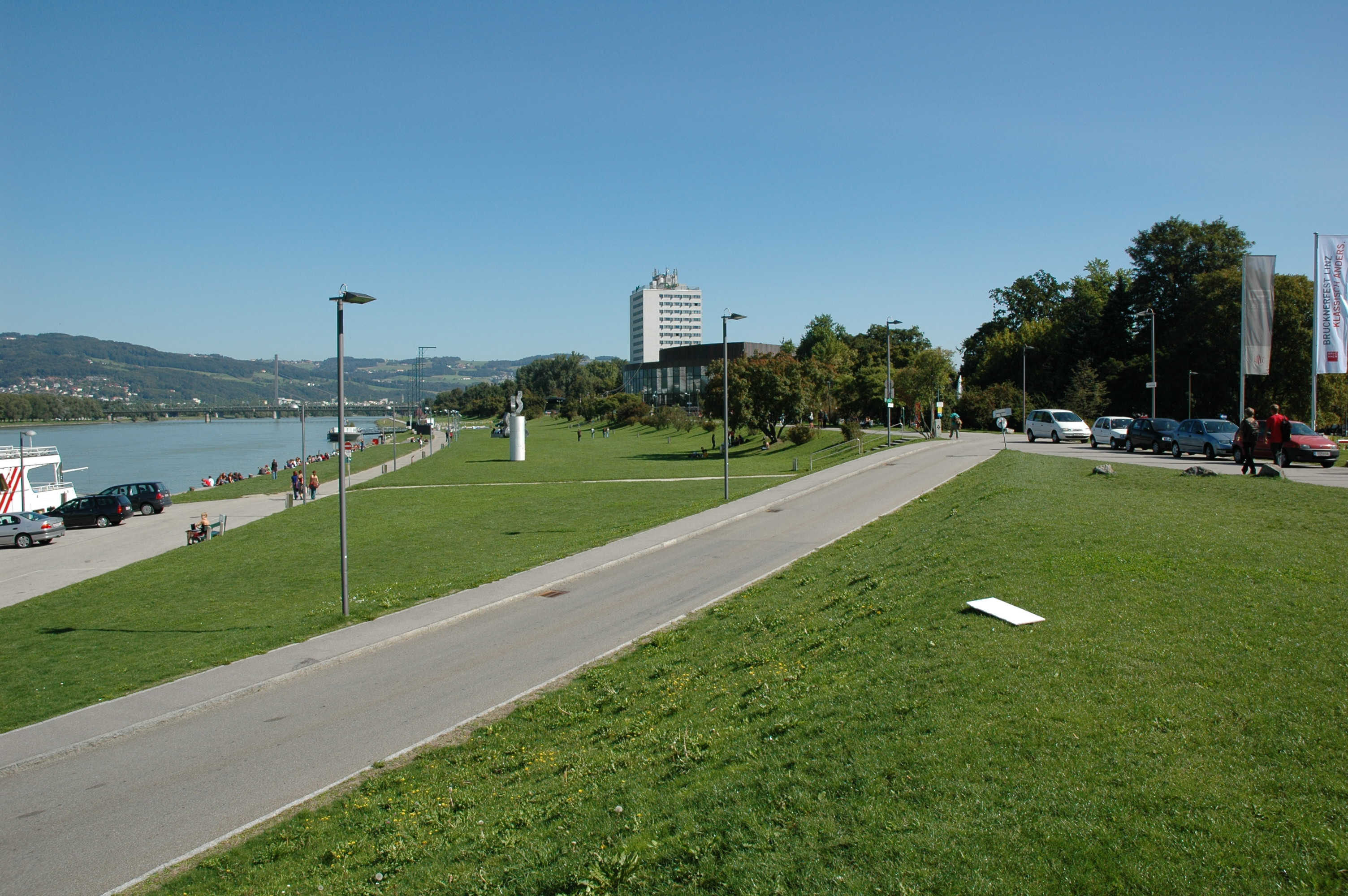
Site of the festival on the Danube river.

Dr. Hannes Leopoldseder, director of the ORF's Upper Austria Regional Studio, was looking for something to connect the Ars Electronica (a festival for art, technology and society) and the Brucknerfest, honoring Austrian composer Anton Bruckner. Discussions with Munich musician and composer Walter Haupt eventually led to the event's creation.

On 18 September 1979, 100,000 people listened as a studio pre-recording of Bruckner's Symphony No. 8 in C minor was broadcast through a 20 kilowatt quadrophonic speaker system, opening the Brucknerfest. In 1980, the Bruckner Orchester Linz, under Theodor Guschlbauer, performed Bruckner's Symphony No. 4 live. Since 1980, the event has been transmitted live from the Brucknerhaus. Currently, speakers with a total power of 250 kilowatts are installed on cranes in front of the Brucknerhaus between the Nibelungen Bridge and a railway bridge. Artists and artist groups that played at the Sound of Cloud were Airan Berg, Parov Stelar, Beda Percht, Hubert Lepka & Lawine Torrèn, Xailabs GmbH, and the artist group Helix.

In 2019, the visualized cloud of sound celebrated its 40th birthday with an anniversary edition.
