= Cannonball's Bossa Nova =

Studio album by Cannonball Adderley
- Released: July 1963
- Recorded: December 7, 1962 (#1–2, 6); December 10, 1962 (#3, 7–8); December 11, 1962 (#4–5); New York City
- Genre: Jazz, bossa nova
- Length: 34:46
- Label: Riverside; RLP 455
- Producer: Orrin Keepnews

Cannonball Adderley chronology
Jazz Workshop Revisited (1962)	Cannonball's Bossa Nova (1963)	Nippon Soul (1964)

Cannonball's Bossa Nova is a 1962 album by jazz musician Julian "Cannonball" Adderley. First released on Riverside in 1963, the album was reissued on Capitol Records several times with different covers and titles.

== Reception ==
The Allmusic review by Al Campbell awarded the album 2 stars and states: "Unfortunately this release contains little fire, as Adderley didn't get much rehearsal time with these musicians. Combined with the repetitious nature of the Bossa Nova these proceedings can get tedious." The Penguin Guide to Jazz awarded the album 3 stars, stating: "Cannonball's Bossa Nova finds Adderley on a Brazilian vacation, with some of the local talent. Little more than a sweet-natured excursion into some of the indigenous music, it's a pleasing diversion."

Professional ratings
Review scores
Source	Rating
Allmusic	2/5 stars
The Penguin Guide to Jazz	3/4 stars

== Track listing ==
1. "Clouds" (Durval Ferreira, Maurício Einhorn) – 4:54
2. "Minha Saudade" (João Donato) – 2:22
3. "Corcovado" (Antonio Carlos Jobim) – 6:44
4. "Batida Differente" (Ferreira, Einhorn) – 3:25
5. "Joyce's Samba" (Ferreira, Einhorn) – 3:12
6. "Groovy Samba" (Sérgio Mendes) – 4:59
7. "O Amor Em Paz (Once I Loved)" (Jobim, Vinicius de Moraes, João Gilberto) – 7:47
8. "Sambop" (Ferreira, Einhorn) – 3:34

Bonus tracks on CD reissue:

9. "Corcovado" [Alternate Take] – 5:35
10. "Clouds" [Single Version] – 2:41

== Personnel ==
- Cannonball Adderley - alto saxophone
- The musicians forming the loosely studio group "Bossa Rio Sextet of Brazil", were:
- Sérgio Mendes - piano
- Durval Ferreira - guitar
- Octavio Bailly, Jr. - bass
- Dom Um Romão - drums
- Pedro Paulo - trumpet (#2, 4–5, 7–8)
- Paulo Moura - alto saxophone (#2, 4–5, 7–8)
