= Joe Zawinul =

Austrian jazz keyboardist and composer (1932–2007)

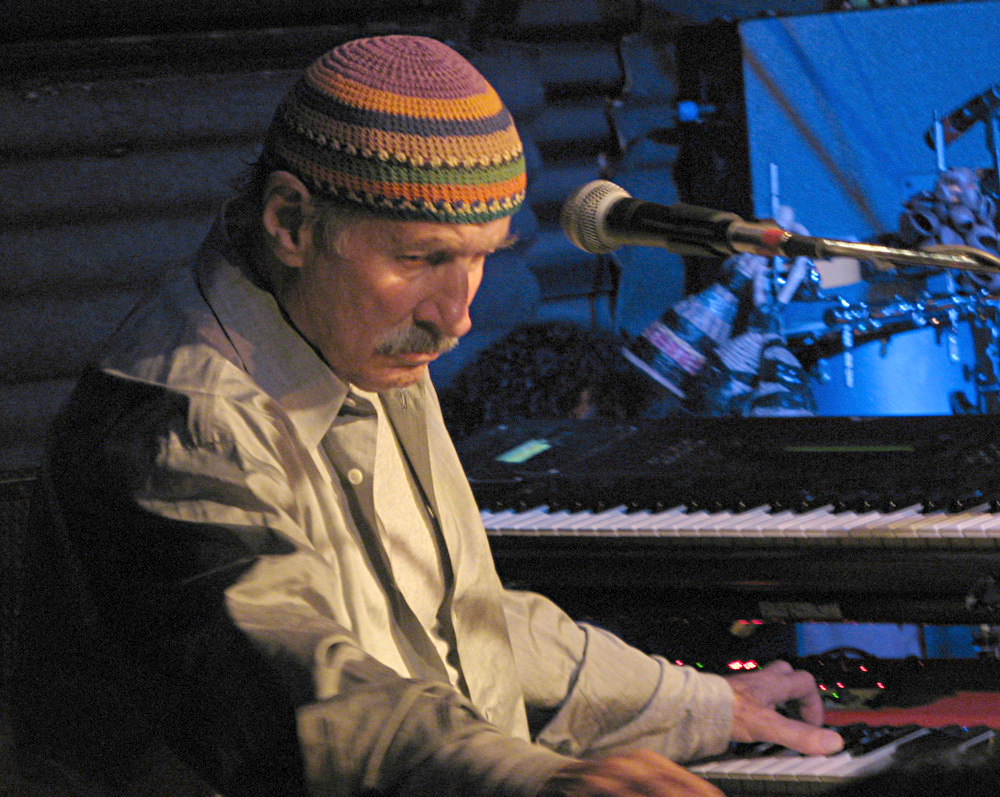
- Zawinul in 2007

Background information
- Born: Josef Erich Zawinul; 7 July 1932; Vienna, Austria
- Died: 11 September 2007 (aged 75) Vienna, Austria
- Genres: Jazz; jazz fusion; R&B; soul music; blue-eyed soul; crossover jazz; world music
- Occupations: Musician; composer
- Instrument: Keyboards
- Years active: 1949–2007
- Labels: Columbia; ESC; BHM; Intuition
- Formerly of: Weather Report; The Zawinul Syndicate
- Website: joezawinul.com

Josef Erich Zawinul (/ˈzɒvɪnəl/ ZOV-in-əl; 7 July 1932 – 11 September 2007) was an Austrian jazz and jazz fusion keyboardist and composer. First coming to prominence with saxophonist Cannonball Adderley, Zawinul went on to play with Miles Davis and to become one of the creators of jazz fusion, a musical genre that combined jazz with rock. He co-founded the groups Weather Report and The Zawinul Syndicate. He pioneered the use of electric piano and synthesizer, and was named "Best Electric Keyboardist" twenty-eight times by the readers of DownBeat magazine.

== Biography ==
=== Early life and career ===
Zawinul grew up in Vienna, Austria. Accordion was his first instrument. When he was six or seven, he studied clarinet, violin, and piano at the Vienna Conservatory (Konservatorium Wien). During the 1950s, he was a staff pianist for Polydor. He worked as a jazz musician with Hans Koller, Friedrich Gulda, Karl Drewo, and Fatty George. In 1959, he moved to the U.S. to attend Berklee College of Music, but a week later he received a job offer from Maynard Ferguson, so he left school and went on tour. He then accompanied Dinah Washington. He spent most of the 1960s with Cannonball Adderley. During this time, he wrote "Mercy, Mercy, Mercy", "Walk Tall" and "Country Preacher", and played electric piano. As recounted in Zawinul's New York Times obituary, "It was uncommon then for a black bandleader like Adderley to hire a white sideman like Mr. Zawinul and touring could be problematic. 'I often had to sit in the bottom of the car when we drove through certain parts of the South,' Mr. Zawinul said in a 1997 interview with Anil Prasad of Innerviews magazine. But, he added, with characteristic bravado, 'Those kinds of things never fazed me; I wanted to play music with the best, and I could play on that level with the best.'"

At the end of the decade, Zawinul recorded with Miles Davis on In a Silent Way and Bitches Brew, as Davis established the genre of jazz fusion by combining jazz with rock.

=== With Weather Report ===
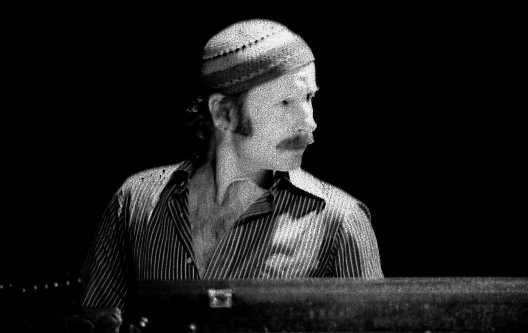
Zawinul with Weather Report in Toronto, 1977 Photo: Jean-Luc Ourlin

In 1970, Zawinul founded Weather Report with Wayne Shorter. Their first two years emphasized a relatively open, group improvisation format similar to what Miles Davis was doing in a more rock-oriented format. However, Zawinul started making changes with their third album, Sweetnighter. Funk elements such as bass guitar and wah-wah pedal began to be introduced to the band's sound. With the fourth album, Mysterious Traveller, the musical forms were composed similar to classical music, and the combination of jazz harmonies with 1970s groove helped move the band into its most commercially successful period.

The band's biggest commercial success came from Zawinul's composition "Birdland" on the 1977 album Heavy Weather, which peaked at number 30 on the Billboard pop albums chart. "Birdland" is one of the most recognizable jazz pieces of the 1970s, recorded by The Manhattan Transfer, Quincy Jones, Maynard Ferguson, and Buddy Rich among others. The song won him three Grammys.

Weather Report was active until the mid-1980s, with Zawinul and Shorter remaining the sole constant members through multiple personnel shifts. Shorter and Zawinul went separate ways after recording Sportin' Life, but it was discovered they had to do one more album to fulfill their contract with CBS Records. This Is This! therefore became the band's final album.

In 1991, Zawinul was awarded an Honorary Doctorate of Music from Berklee College of Music and on this occasion performed with a group consisting of Matthew Garrison, Torsten de Winkel, Abe Laboriel Jr. and Melvin Butler.

=== With The Zawinul Syndicate ===
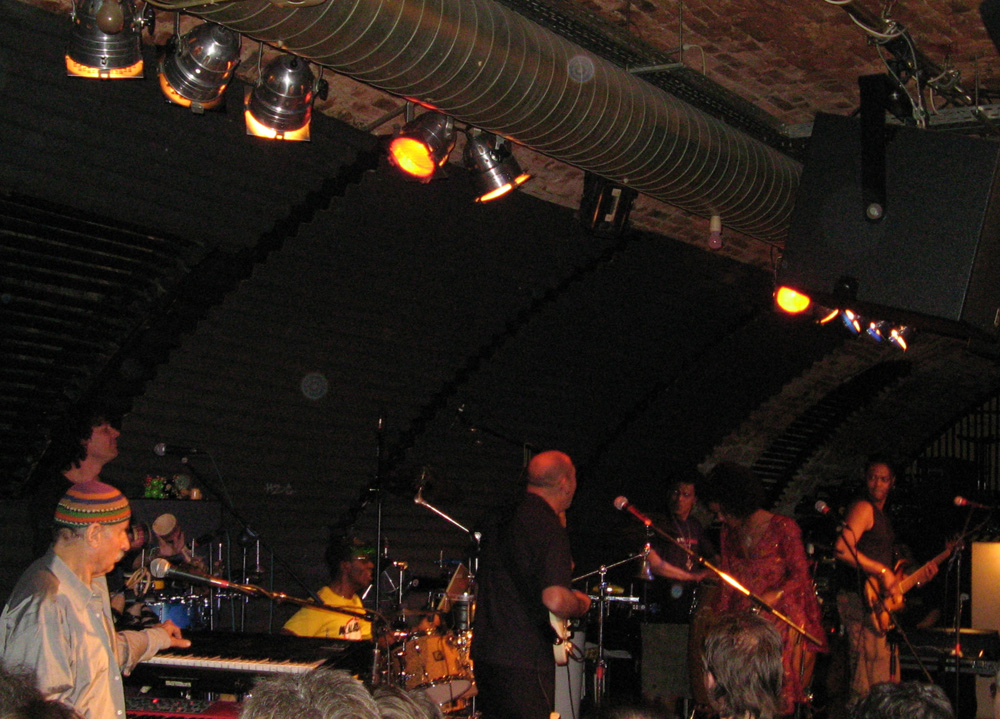
The Zawinul Syndicate, live in Freiburg, 28 March 2007

The Zawinul Syndicate was a jazz fusion band formed in 1988. It evolved out of Weather Report. Their style could be described as a combination of unusual grooves, driving and swinging rhythms and many borrowings from different music cultures.

Zawinul himself stated that he gave the band its name due to a syndicate bearing more resemblance to a family than "just" a band.

After the death of Zawinul in 2007, several members of the Zawinul Syndicate decided to reform and perform Zawinul's music live under their shortened name the Syndicate.

Several major members of the Syndicate over the years include Scott Henderson, Matthew Garrison, Bobby Thomas Jr, Linley Marthe, Paco Sery, Manolo Badrena, Nathaniel Townsley, Sabine Kabongo, Gary Poulson, Richard Bona, and Victor Bailey.

=== Stories of the Danube ===
Zawinul also wrote a symphony, called Stories of the Danube, which was commissioned by the Brucknerhaus, Linz. It was first performed as part of the Linzer Klangwolke (a large-scale open-air broadcast event), for the opening of the 1993 Bruckner Festival in Linz. In its seven movements, the symphony traces the course of the Danube from Donaueschingen through various countries ending at the Black Sea. It was recorded in 1995 by the Czech State Philharmonic Orchestra, Brno, conducted by Caspar Richter.

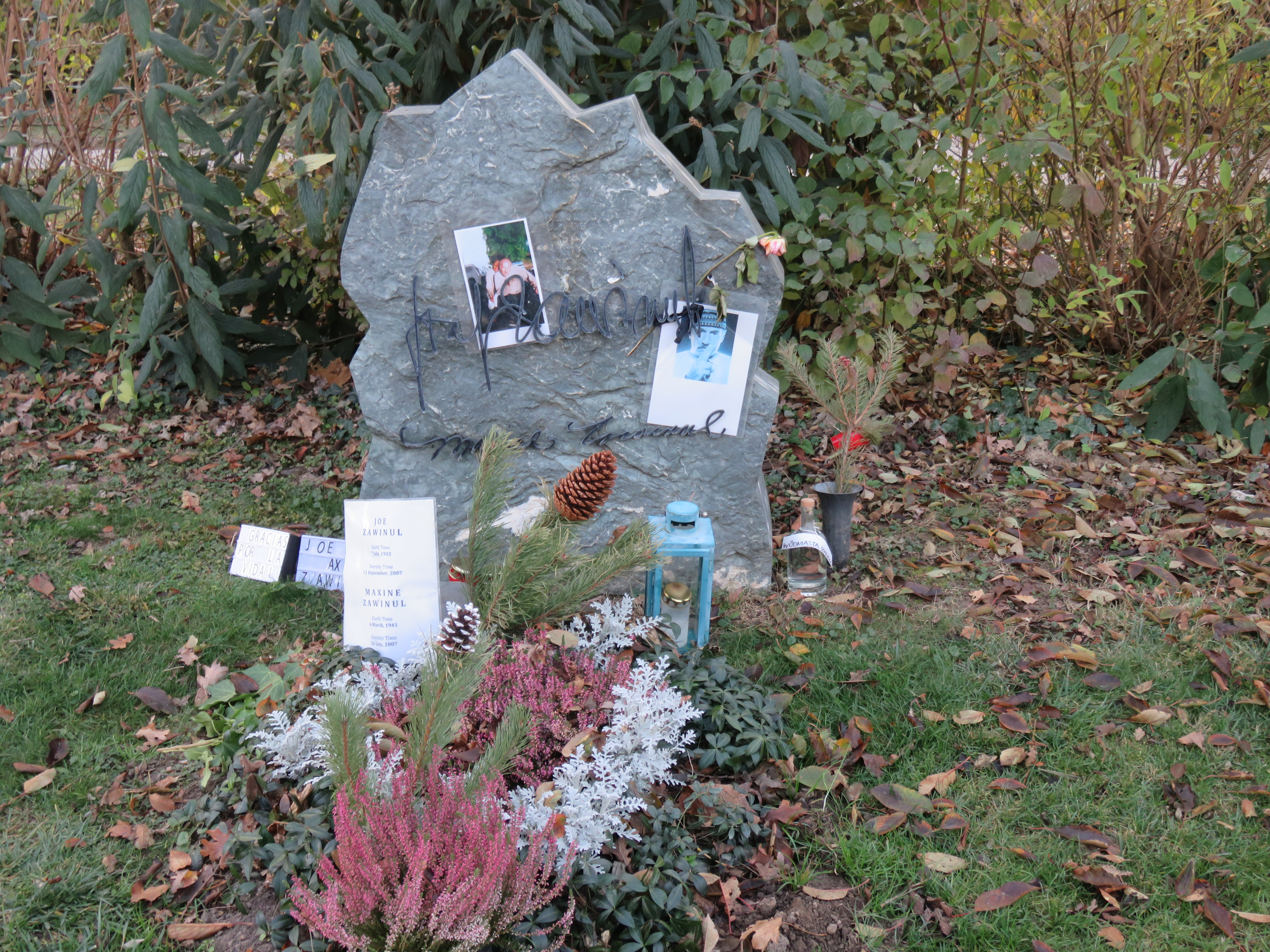
Joe Zawinul's grave in Vienna Central Cemetery, Vienna

=== Death ===
Zawinul became ill and was hospitalized in his native Vienna on 7 August 2007, after concluding a five-week European tour. He died a little over a month later from a rare form of skin cancer (Merkel cell carcinoma) on 11 September 2007. He was cremated at Feuerhalle Simmering and his ashes buried in Vienna Central Cemetery. His wife Maxine had died earlier the same year. They were survived by their sons Erich, Ivan, and Anthony.

Keyboardist/composer Dave Greenslade wrote the song "Born in Eternity Time" from his 2011 album Routes/Roots as a memorial to Zawinul. He explained the title in the liner notes: "On his passing in 2007 his son remarked his father was now born in eternity time."

== Discography ==
=== As leader/co-leader ===
Recording date	Title / Co-leader	Label	Year released	Notes
1954–10–18, 1954–12–05, 1955–01, 1955–09–21, 1957–03–12, –21	His Majesty Swinging Nephews 1954 - 1957 with The Austrian All Stars	RST	1992	[CD] Compilation of 7" records in Austria with previously unreleased tracks
1959-09	To You With Love	Strand	1961	As Joe Zawinul Trio
1963-09-20, 1963-10-14	Soulmates with Ben Webster	Riverside	1963	
1966-02-07	Money in the Pocket	Atlantic	1966	
1967-10-16, -21; 1967-12-12	The Rise and Fall of the Third Stream	Vortex	1968	
1970-08-06 – 1970-10-28	Zawinul	Atlantic	1971	
1985	Dialects	Columbia	1986	
1988-05-20, -21	Music for Two Pianos with Friedrich Gulda	Capriccio	1988	Produced by Wolfgang Hirschmann. WDR Big Band conducted by Jerry van Rooyen on 1 track.
1988	The Immigrants	Columbia	1988	As the Zawinul Syndicate
1988–07 – 1989	Black Water	Columbia	1989	As the Zawinul Syndicate. Partially live recorded in Copenhagen (July 1988).
1992?	Lost Tribes	Columbia	1992	As the Zawinul Syndicate
1992 – 1996	My People	ESC	1996	
1995-11, 1996-02	Stories of the Danube	Philips Classics	1996	Commissioned by the Brucknerhaus
1997-05, 1997-11	World Tour	ESC	1998	[2CD] Live with the Zawinul Syndicate in Trier and Berlin. Nominated to Grammy Award for Best Contemporary Jazz Performance.
1998 – 2000	Mauthausen - Vom großen Sterben hören	ESC	2000	Accepted a request for memorial music from the Mauthausen concentration camp community. Wayne Shorter on 1 track.
2000 – 2002-03	Faces & Places	ESC	2002	Partially live recorded in Sydney and Paris. Nominated to Grammy Award for Best Contemporary Jazz Album.
2002-11-07	Midnight Jam	ESC	2004	[2CD] Live at Zawinul's 70th birthday party at the Leverkusener Jazztage with WDR Big Band
2004-05-26 – -30, 2004-09-21 – 2004-10-01	Vienna Nights: Live at Joe Zawinul's Birdland	BHM/JVC	2005	[2CD / 1CD (JVC)] Live with the Zawinul Syndicate in Vienna. Dedicated to Thomas Klestil.
2005-10	Brown Street	Intuition	2006	[2CD] Live recorded in Vienna with Victor Bailey, Alex Acuña, Nathaniel Townsley and WDR Big Band
2007-07-07, 2007-08-02	75	BHM/JVC	2008	[2CD] Live recordings with the Zawinul Syndicate. A session at Zawinul's 75th birthday party and another TV session with Wayne Shorter at Veszprém. Posthumous release. Won Grammy Award for Best Contemporary Jazz Album.
2007-01, 2007-04, 2007-09	Absolute Zawinul featured by the Absolute Ensemble	Intuition	2009	Conducted by Kristjan Järvi. Partially live recorded in Vienna (September 2007). Overdubs recorded in June 2007 and June 2008. Posthumous release.

Compilations

- Concerto Retitled (Atlantic, 1976)
- The ESC Years (ESC, 2011)

As leader of Weather Report

- 1971: Weather Report (Columbia, 1971)
- 1972: I Sing the Body Electric (Columbia, 1972)
- 1972: Live in Tokyo (CBS/Sony, 1972) – live
- 1973: Sweetnighter (Columbia, 1973)
- 1974: Mysterious Traveller (Columbia, 1974)
- 1975: Tale Spinnin' (Columbia, 1975)
- 1975–1976: Black Market (Columbia, 1976)
- 1976–1977: Heavy Weather (Columbia, 1977)
- 1978: Mr. Gone (Columbia, 1978)
- 1978–1979: 8:30 (Columbia, 1979) – live
- 1980: Night Passage (Columbia, 1980)
- 1981: Weather Report (Columbia, 1982)
- 1983: Procession (Columbia, 1983)
- 1983: Domino Theory (Columbia, 1984)
- 1984: Sportin' Life (Columbia, 1985)
- 1985: This Is This! (Columbia, 1986)

Posthumous compilations

- Live and Unreleased (Columbia, 2002)[2CD]
- Forecast: Tomorrow (Columbia, 2006)[3CD & DVD-Video]
- The Legendary Live Tapes: 1978-1981 (Columbia, 2015)[4CD]

As leader of Weather Update

- Joe Zawinul and Weather Update (Pioneer/Geneon, 2005)[DVD-Video] – live rec. 1986 at the Munich Philharmonic hall. Posthumous release.

=== As sideman ===
With Cannonball Adderley

- Nancy Wilson/Cannonball Adderley (Capitol, 1962) - rec. 1961
- The Cannonball Adderley Sextet in New York (Riverside, 1962)
- Cannonball in Europe! (Riverside, 1962)
- Jazz Workshop Revisited (Riverside, 1962)
- Nippon Soul (Riverside, 1964) - rec. 1963
- Cannonball Adderley Live! (Capitol, 1964) - live
- Live Session! (Capitol, 1964) - live
- Cannonball Adderley's Fiddler on the Roof (Capitol, 1964)
- Domination (Capitol, 1965)
- Great Love Themes (Capitol, 1966)
- Cannonball in Japan (Capitol, 1966) - live
- Mercy, Mercy, Mercy! Live at 'The Club' (Capitol, 1967) - rec. 1966
- 74 Miles Away (Capitol, 1967)
- Why Am I Treated So Bad! (Capitol, 1967)
- In Person (Capitol, 1968)
- Accent on Africa (Capitol, 1968)
- Country Preacher (Capitol, 1970) - live rec. 1969
- The Cannonball Adderley Quintet & Orchestra (Capitol, 1970)
- The Price You Got to Pay to Be Free (Capitol, 1970)
- Autumn Leaves (Riverside [Japan], 1975) - rec. 1963
- The Sextet (Milestone, 1982) - rec. 1962-1963
- Radio Nights (Night, 1991) - rec. 1967–1968
- Money in the Pocket (Capitol, 2005) - rec. 1966

With Nat Adderley

- Naturally! (Jazzland, 1961)
- Autobiography (Atlantic, 1965)
- Live at Memory Lane (Atlantic, 1967) - live rec. 1966
- The Scavenger (Milestone, 1968)
- Calling Out Loud (CTI, 1968)
- You, Baby (CTI, 1969) - rec. 1968

With Miles Davis

- 1969: In a Silent Way (Columbia, 1969)
- 1969: Bitches Brew (Columbia, 1970)
- 1970: Live-Evil (Columbia, 1971)
- compilation: Big Fun (Columbia, 1974)
- compilation: Circle in the Round (Columbia, 1979)
- compilation: Directions (Miles Davis album) (Columbia, 1981)

With Yusef Lateef

- The Centaur and the Phoenix (Riverside, 1960)
- Suite 16 (Atlantic, 1970)

With Herbie Mann

- A Mann & A Woman (Atlantic, 1967) – also with Tamiko Jones. rec. 1966.
- The Beat Goes On (Atlantic, 1967) – rec. 1964-1967

With Dinah Washington

- What a Diff'rence a Day Makes! (Mercury, 1959)
- The Two of Us (Mercury, 1960) – also with Brook Benton
- Live at Birdland (Baldwin, 1997) – live rec. 1962

With others

- Friedrich Gulda and his Eurojazz-Orchestra, Eurosuite / Variations (Preiser, 1967) - rec. 1966
- Trilok Gurtu, Crazy Saints (CMP, 1993)
- Victor Feldman, Soviet Jazz Themes (Äva, 1963) - rec. 1962
- Jimmy Forrest, Out of the Forrest (Prestige, 1961)
- Eddie Harris, Silver Cycles (Atlantic, 1969) – rec. 1968
- Sam Jones, Down Home (Riverside, 1962)
- Quincy Jones, Back on the Block (Quest/Warner Bros, 1989) – rec. 1988–1989
- Katia Labèque, Little Girl Blue (Dreyfus, 1995)
- Salif Keita, Amen (Mango, 1991)
- David "Fathead" Newman, The Many Facets of David Newman (Atlantic, 1969) – rec. 1968–1969
- Miroslav Vitouš, Purple (CBS/Sony, 1970)

== Biographies ==
- Glasser, Brian (2001). In a Silent Way: A Portrait of Joe Zawinul. London: Sanctuary. ISBN 1-86074-326-9. OCLC 45900631.
- Baumann, Gunther (2002). Zawinul: Ein Leben aus Jazz [Zawinul: A Life of Jazz] (in German). Salzburg; Wien: Frankfurt am Main; Residenz. ISBN 3-7017-1291-3. OCLC 469270497.
- Yamashita, Kunihiko (2006). Joe Zawinul: On the Creative Process. Tokyo: Rittor Music. ISBN 4-8456-1337-9. OCLC 169983180.
