= Tokyo Kōsei Nenkin Kaikan =

Concert hall in Shinjuku, Tokyo

Coordinates: 35.6920°N 139.7113°E

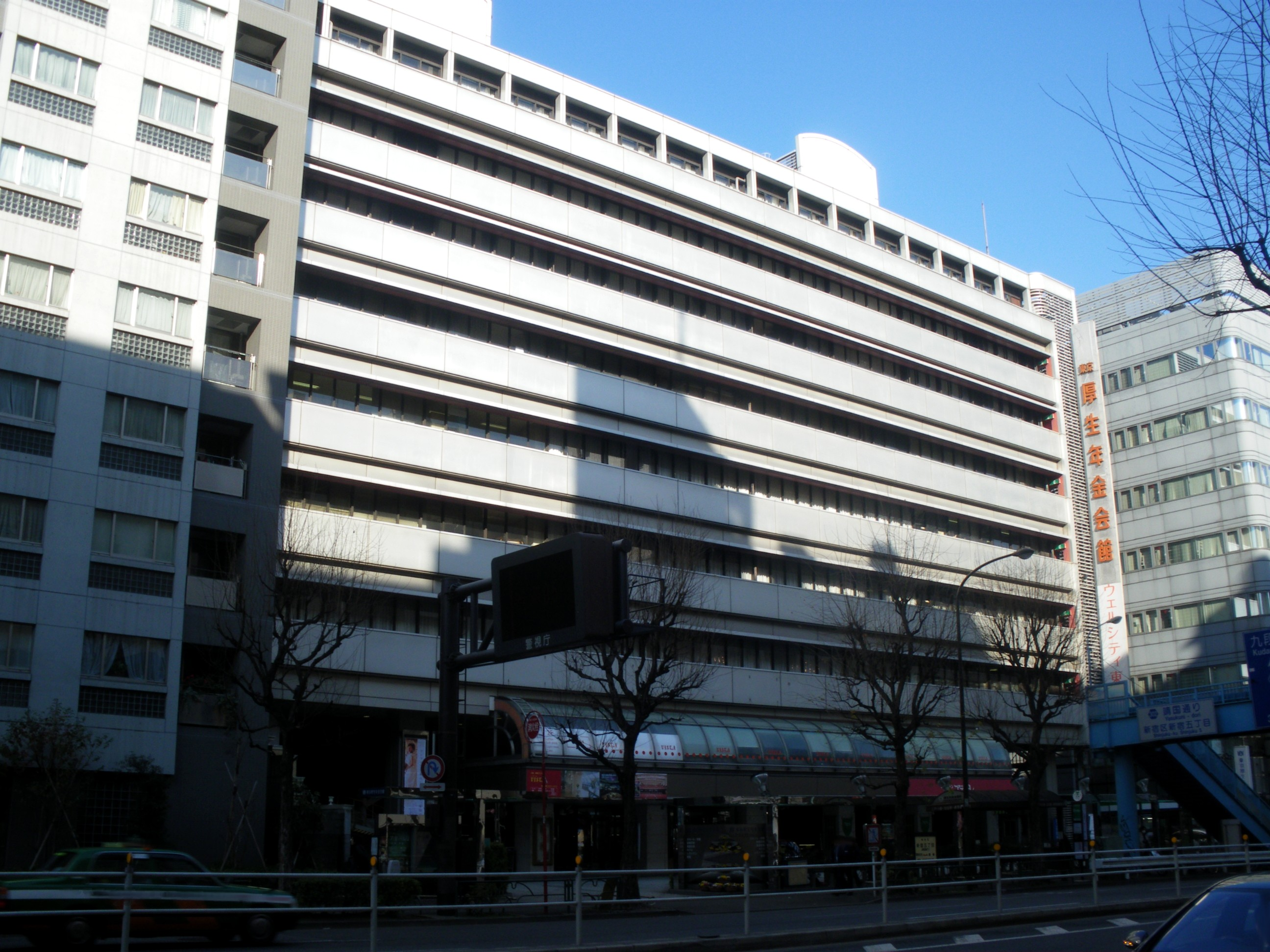
Tokyo Kōsei Nenkin Kaikan in 2009

Tokyo Kōsei Nenkin Kaikan (東京厚生年金会館), also known as Wel City Tokyo, was a 2,062-seat (1st floor: 1,186 seats, 2nd floor: 876 seats) concert hall in Tokyo, one of a number of public concert halls in Japan called Kōsei Nenkin Kaikan. John Coltrane's quintet performed here on their Japanese tour (1966). Dutch band Shocking Blue who were internationally famous after topping the US charts with their hit "Venus", performed here in July, 1971. Parts of these concerts were used for their 'Live in Japan' - album of 1971. Journey also performed here on their Escape tour (1981). The Irish R&B guitarist Rory Gallagher performed two concerts at the venue in 1977. Noted Jamaican Reggae act Bob Marley and the Wailers performed the venue in 1979. The band, Survivor performed a concert here in 1985.

Opened on 15 April 1961, the hall closed on March 31, 2010.
