= Sankei Hall =

Sankei Hall was a multi-purpose auditorium located in Ōtemachi, Tokyo, Japan. Notable past performers include Cannonball Adderley, John Coltrane, B.B. King, Milva, The Beach Boys, Free and The Shadows (1969).
