= Hampton Hawes =

American jazz pianist (1928–1977)

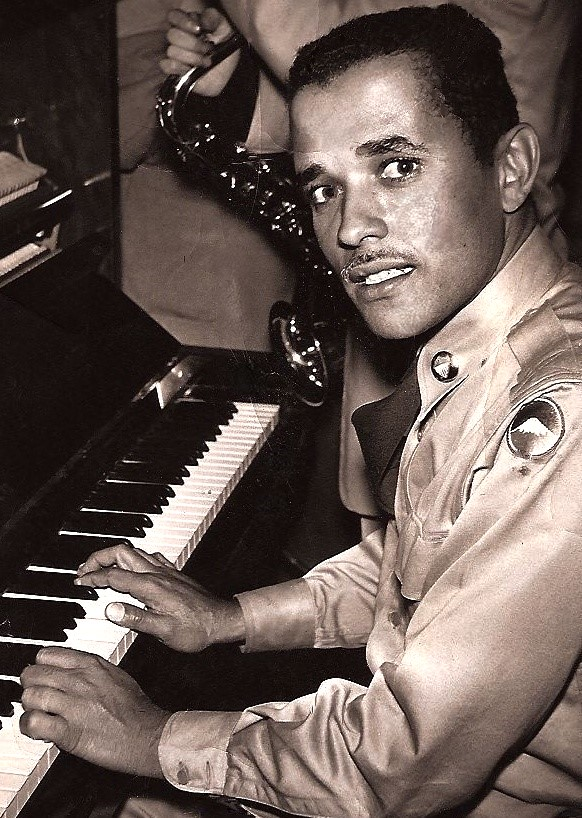
- Hawes in Japan in 1953

Background information
- Born: Hampton Barnett Hawes Jr. November 13, 1928; Los Angeles, California, U.S.
- Died: May 22, 1977 (aged 48) Los Angeles
- Genres: Jazz, hard bop, soul jazz, bebop, West Coast jazz
- Occupation: Musician
- Instrument: Piano
- Labels: Vault, Contemporary, Discovery, Fantasy

Hampton Barnett Hawes Jr. (November 13, 1928 – May 22, 1977) was an American jazz pianist. He was the author of the memoir Raise Up Off Me, which won the Deems-Taylor Award for music writing in 1975.

== Early life ==
Hampton Hawes was born on November 13, 1928, in Los Angeles, California. His father, Hampton Hawes Sr., was minister of Westminster Presbyterian Church. His mother, the former Gertrude Holman, was Westminster's church pianist. Though part of a musical family, Hawes was almost entirely self-taught on the piano.

== Life and career ==
By his teens, Hawes was playing with some of the leading jazz musicians on the West Coast, including Dexter Gordon, Wardell Gray, Art Pepper, Shorty Rogers, and Teddy Edwards. His second professional job, at 18, was playing for eight months with the Howard McGhee Quintet at the Hi De Ho Club, in a group that included Charlie Parker. Hawes began recording at 19, in 1947. Artists from early session dates included George L. "Happy" Johnson, Teddy Edwards, Sonny Criss, and Shorty Rogers. From 1948 to 1952, he appeared on numerous live recording dates, including at leading Los Angeles-area jazz clubs including The Haig, The Lighthouse, and The Surf Club. His first recordings as a leader were in 1952, for the Discovery and Prestige labels, the latter being with a quartet that featured Larry Bunker on vibraphone.

Hawes was drafted into the Army in 1952 and sent to Japan. While stationed at Camp Drake near Tokyo, he mainly played in "Army bands, shows and officer clubs", in the 289th Army Band, the American Embassy, and extensively in Tokyo and Yokohama's jazz clubs. Hawes greatly influenced local jazz musicians in post-war Japan (one of whom was a young Toshiko Akiyoshi, a profound admirer of Hawes) who had previously relied on what few recordings they could obtain to understand the new developments in the music. However, he ran into trouble with the law due to narcotics use. He was arrested, sentenced, and imprisoned in Tokyo before being sent back to California to serve out his time in 1954.

After his discharge from the Army, Hawes formed his own trio, with bassist Red Mitchell and drummer Chuck Thompson. The three-record Trio sessions made by this group in 1955 on Contemporary Records were considered some of the finest records to come out of the West Coast at the time. The next year, Hawes added guitarist Jim Hall for the All Night Session! album. These were three records made during a non-stop overnight recording session.

After a six-month national tour in 1956, Hawes won the "New Star of the Year" award in Down Beat magazine, and "Arrival of the Year" in Metronome. The following year, he recorded in New York City with Charles Mingus on the album Mingus Three (Jubilee, 1957).

Struggling for many years with a heroin addiction, in 1958 Hawes became the target of a federal undercover operation in Los Angeles. Investigators believed that he would inform on suppliers rather than risk ruining a successful music career. Hawes was arrested on heroin charges on his 30th birthday and was sentenced to ten years imprisonment. In the intervening weeks between his trial and sentencing, Hawes recorded an album of spirituals and gospel songs, The Sermon, in dedication to his father, who was retiring after 45 years as minister of Westminster Church.

In 1961, while imprisoned at Fort Worth Federal Medical Facility, Hawes was watching President Kennedy's inaugural speech on television, and became convinced that Kennedy would pardon him. With help from inside and outside the prison, Hawes submitted an official application for Executive Clemency. In August 1963, Kennedy granted Hawes clemency, the 42nd of only 43 such pardons given in the final year of Kennedy's presidency.

After being released from prison, Hawes resumed playing and recording. Recordings on Contemporary Records from the early 1960s include "The Green Leaves of Summer" and "Here and Now." Yet as jazz was fading as the leading popular music in America after the arrival of The Beatles in 1964, Hawes struggled, like so many jazz musicians, to maintain his career. When he took a ten-month trip to Europe and Asia with his wife Jacque, who was on a study-sabbatical as a teacher, Hawes was shocked to discover that he had become a legend overseas. Embraced by major jazz audiences, clubs, and recording companies, Hawes played and recorded nearly non-stop, appearing on television and radio, and recording ten albums in so many months.

Raise Up Off Me, Hawes' autobiography, written with Don Asher and published in 1974, shed light on his heroin addiction, the bebop movement, and his friendships with some of the leading jazz musicians of his time. It won the ASCAP Deems Taylor Award for music writing in 1975. Critic Gary Giddins, who wrote the book's introduction, called Raise Up Off Me "a major contribution to the literature of jazz." The book Raise Up Off Me includes details about the ambivalent relationship of Hawes and Charlie Parker.

Hampton Hawes died unexpectedly of a brain hemorrhage in 1977, at the age of 48.

== Style and influence ==
Hawes' playing style developed in the mid-1940s. He included "figures used by Parker and [Bud] Powell (but he played with a cleaner articulation than Powell), some Oscar Peterson phrases, and later, some Bill Evans phrases [...], and an impressive locked-hands style in which the top notes always sang out clearly." He also helped develop "the double-note blues figures and rhythmically compelling comping style that Horace Silver and others were to use in the mid-1950s." His technique featured "great facility with rapid runs and a versatile control of touch."

Hawes was influenced by some jazz pianists, including Thelonious Monk and Bud Powell. Hawes' own influences came from a number of sources, including the gospel music and spirituals he heard in his father's church as a child, and the boogie-woogie piano of Earl Hines. Hawes also learned much from pianists Powell and Nat King Cole, among others. However, his principal source of influence was his friend Charlie Parker; "It was Bird`s conception of time that influenced me most...Of course I didn`t try to copy his solos or anything like that, but I think Parker has influenced me more than anybody, even piano players."

== Discography ==
=== As leader/co-leader ===
Recording date	Title	Label	Year released	Personnel/Notes
1951-9	The Hampton Hawes Trio	Vantage Records	1951	With Harper Cosby (bass), Lawrence Marable (drums).
1952-12	Hampton Hawes Quartet	Prestige	1955	Quartet, with Clarence Jones (bass), Lawrence Marable (drums), Larry Bunker (vibraphone). Later re-issued on "Freddie Redd/Hampton Hawes Piano: East/West" by Prestige in 1956.
1955-06	Hampton Hawes Trio	Contemporary	1955	One track solo piano; most tracks trio, with Red Mitchell (bass), Chuck Thompson (drums).
1955-06, 1955-12, 1956-01	This Is Hampton Hawes	Contemporary	1956	Trio, with Red Mitchell (bass), Chuck Thompson (drums)
1956-01	Everybody Likes Hampton Hawes	Contemporary	1956	Trio, with Red Mitchell (bass), Chuck Thompson (drums)
1956-11	All Night Session! Vol. 1	Contemporary	1958	Quartet, with Jim Hall (guitar), Red Mitchell (bass), Eldridge Freeman (drums)
1956-11	All Night Session! Vol. 2	Contemporary	1958	Quartet, with Jim Hall (guitar), Red Mitchell (bass), Eldridge Freeman (drums)
1956-11	All Night Session! Vol. 3	Contemporary	1958	Quartet, with Jim Hall (guitar), Red Mitchell (bass), Eldridge Freeman (drums)
1957-04, 1957-05	Baritones and French Horns	Prestige	1958	Septet, with Curtis Fuller (trombone), Sahib Shihab (alto sax), David Amram and Julius Watkins (French horn), Addison Farmer (bass), Jerry Segal (drums); originally issued with other recordings; reissued as Curtis Fuller and Hampton Hawes with French Horns by Status
1958-01	Four!	Contemporary	1958	Quartet, with Barney Kessel (guitar), Red Mitchell (bass), Shelly Manne (drums)
1956-01, 1958-03	Bird Song	Contemporary	1999	Most tracks trio with Paul Chambers (bass), Larance Marable (drums); two tracks trio listing Scott LaFaro (bass), Frank Butler (drums)
1958-03	For Real!	Contemporary	1961	Quartet, with Harold Land (tenor sax), Scott LaFaro (bass), Frank Butler (drums)
1958-11	The Sermon	Contemporary	1987	Trio, with Leroy Vinnegar (bass), Stan Levey (drums)
1964-02	The Green Leaves of Summer	Contemporary	1964	Trio, with Monk Montgomery (bass), Steve Ellington (drums)
1965-05	Here and Now	Contemporary	1966	Trio, with Chuck Israels (bass), Donald Bailey (drums)
1966-04, 1966-05	The Seance	Contemporary	1969	Trio, with Red Mitchell (bass), Donald Bailey (drums)
1966-04, 1966-05	I'm All Smiles	Contemporary	1973	Trio, with Red Mitchell (bass), Donald Bailey (drums)
1967	Hamp's Piano	SABA	1969	also released as Hampton Hawes in Europe (Prestige)
1968-01	Key for Two	BYG Actuel	1973	with Martial Solal
1968-03	Spanish Steps	Black Lion	1971	Trio, with Jimmy Woode (bass), Art Taylor (drums). also released as Blues for Bud
1968-05	The Challenge	Victor	1968	Solo piano
1968?	Jam Session	Columbia	1968	with Isao Suzuki (bass), George Otsuka (drums), Shungo Sawada (guitar), Akira Miyazawa (ts), Hidehiko Matsumoto (ts)
1970?	High in the Sky	Vault	1970	Trio, with Leroy Vinnegar (bass), Donald Bailey (drums)
1971-09	This Guy's in Love with You	Freedom	1974	Trio, with Henry Franklin (bass), Michael Carvin (drums); in concert; also released as Live at the Montmartre (Freedom)
1971-09	A Little Copenhagen Night Music	Freedom	1977	Trio, with Henry Franklin (bass), Michael Carvin (drums); in concert
1972-06	Universe	Prestige	1972	With Oscar Brashear (trumpet), Harold Land tenor sax), Arthur Adams (guitar), Chuck Rainey (electric bass), Ndugu (drums)
1973-01	Blues for Walls	Prestige	1973	Two tracks quartet, with George Walker (guitar), Henry Franklin (bass, electric bass), Ndugu (drums); most tracks sextet, with Oscar Brashear (trumpet), Hadley Caliman (soprano sax, tenor sax) added
1973-06	Live at the Jazz Showcase in Chicago Volume One	Enja	1981	Trio, with Cecil McBee (bass), Roy Haynes (drums); in concert
1973-06	Live at the Jazz Showcase in Chicago Volume Two	Enja	1989	Trio, with Cecil McBee (bass), Roy Haynes (drums); in concert
1973-07	Playin' in the Yard	Prestige	1973	Trio, with Bob Cranshaw (electric bass), Kenny Clarke (drums); in concert
1974-07	Northern Windows	Prestige	1974	With Allen DeRienzo and Snooky Young (trumpet), George Bohanon (trombone), Bill Green, Jackie Kelso and Jay Migliori (saxes, flute), Carol Kaye (electric bass), Spider Webb (drums)
1975-06	Recorded Live at the Great American Music Hall	Concord Jazz	1983	Duo, with Mario Suraci (bass)
1976-01, 1976-08	As Long as There's Music	Artists House	1978	Duo, with Charlie Haden (bass)
1976-06	Something Special	Contemporary	1994	Quartet, with Denny Diaz (guitar), Leroy Vinnegar (bass), Al Williams (drums); in concert;
1976-08	Hampton Hawes at the Piano	Contemporary	1978	Trio, with Ray Brown (bass), Shelly Manne (drums)
1977?	Memory Lane Live	JAS	1977	with Leroy Vinnegar (bass), Bobby Thompson (drums), Harry Edison (trumpet), Sonny Criss (as), Teddy Edwards (ts: B2), Joe Turner (vocals: A3, B1)

Compilations

- The Hampton Hawes Memorial Album (Xanadu, 1982) – rec. 1952–56
- Trio and Quartet 1951-1956 Live and Studio Sessions (Fresh Sound, 2005)[2CD] – rec. 1951–56

=== As sideman ===
With Dexter Gordon

- Blues à la Suisse (Prestige, 1974) – rec. 1973
- The Hunt (Savoy, 1977) – rec. 1947

With Barney Kessel

- Kessel Plays Standards (Contemporary, 1955)
- Let's Cook! (Contemporary, 1962) – rec. 1957

With Art Pepper

- Surf Ride (Savoy, 1956) – rec. 1952–54
- Living Legend (Contemporary, 1975)
- The Early Show (Xanadu, 1979) – rec. 1952

With Shorty Rogers

- Modern Sounds (Capitol, 1951)
- Shorty Rogers and His Giants (RCA Victor, 1953)

With others

- Gene Ammons, Gene Ammons and Friends at Montreux (Prestige, 1973)
- Sonny Criss, I'll Catch the Sun! (Prestige, 1969)
- Art Farmer, On the Road (Contemporary, 1976)
- Wardell Gray, Live in Hollywood (Xanadu, 1978) – rec. 1952
- Warne Marsh, Live in Hollywood (Xanadu, 1979) – rec. 1952
- Charles Mingus, Mingus Three (Jubilee, 1957)
- Blue Mitchell, Stratosonic Nuances (RCA, 1975)
- Red Mitchell, Red Mitchell (Bethlehem, 1955)
- Sonny Rollins, Sonny Rollins and the Contemporary Leaders (Contemporary, 1958)
- Bud Shank, Bud Shank – Shorty Rogers – Bill Perkins (Pacific Jazz, 1955)
- Sonny Stitt, So Doggone Good (Prestige, 1972)

== Bibliography ==
- Raise Up Off Me: A Portrait of Hampton Hawes by Hampton Hawes, Don Asher, and Gary Giddins
- Hampton Hawes: A Discography by Roger Hunter & Mike Davis. 127pp. Manana Publications, Manchester, England. 1986.

== See also ==
- Hard bop
- Soul jazz
- List of people pardoned or granted clemency by the president of the United States
