= Curtis Fuller and Hampton Hawes with French Horns =

Studio album by Curtis Fuller and Hampton Hawes
- Released: 1965
- Recorded: May 18, 1957
- Studio: Van Gelder Studio, Hackensack
- Genre: Jazz
- Length: 36:45
- Label: Status; ST 8305
- Producer: Bob Weinstock

Curtis Fuller chronology
Curtis Fuller with Red Garland (1957)	Curtis Fuller and Hampton Hawes with French Horns (1965)	The Opener (1957)

Hampton Hawes chronology
All Night Session! Vol. 3 (1956)	Curtis Fuller and Hampton Hawes with French Horns (1957)	Mingus Three (1957)

Curtis Fuller and Hampton Hawes with French Horns is an album by trombonist Curtis Fuller with pianist Hampton Hawes recorded in 1957 and originally released as one-half of a 16rpm record Baritones and French Horns but later re-released on the Status label, a subsidiary of Prestige Records in 1964.

== Reception ==
Professional ratings
Review scores
Source	Rating
AllMusic	4/5 stars
The Penguin Guide to Jazz Recordings	3/4 stars

Writing for AllMusic, reviewer Scott Yanow stated: "the colorful ensembles and the very adept soloing by the French horns make this a particularly memorable recording. Strange that this album has been obscure for so long. Only the brief playing time keeps this intriguing set from getting a higher rating".

== Track listing ==
1. "Ronnie's Tune" (Salvatore Zito) - 7:27
2. "Roc and Troll" (Teddy Charles) - 7:11
3. "A-Drift" (Zito) - 6:13
4. "Lyriste" (Charles) - 6:00
5. "Five Spot" (David Amram) - 3:28
6. "No Crooks" (Charles) - 6:26

== Personnel ==
- Curtis Fuller - trombone
- Teddy Charles (track 4), Hampton Hawes (tracks 1–3, 5 & 6) - piano
- Sahib Shihab - alto saxophone
- David Amram, Julius Watkins - French horn
- Addison Farmer - bass
- Jerry Segal - drums
