= Knockers Up! =

Live album by Rusty Warren
- Released: 1960
- Venue: Golden Falcon; Pompano Beach, Florida
- Genre: Comedy
- Label: Jubilee Records

Rusty Warren chronology
Songs for Sinners (1959)	Knockers Up! (1960)	Sin-sational (1961)

Knockers Up! is the second album released by American comedian Rusty Warren in 1960 by the independent record label Jubilee Records. The album became a financial success, lasting on the Billboard Top 200 charts for more than three years. The album consists of a live recording of one of Warren’s performances at the Golden Falcon Hotel in Pompano Beach, Florida.

Dealing with themes of women's infidelity, sex work, and sexual freedom from a woman's perspective, Knockers Up! is notable for its forward-thinking concepts that would later become popular in the Sexual Revolution, with Warren herself later being called "The Mother of the Sexual Revolution".

== Background ==
After Warren’s first album, Songs for Sinners, was successfully released in January 1959, she went on a tour with her record producer Jerry Blaine, co-founder of Jubilee Records. Afterward, Warren and Blaine started working on promoting her second album Knockers Up!.

== Musical content ==
Knockers Up! is a comedy album that deals with themes of sex, with various songs exploring themes and jokes that weren’t typical of female comedians at the time. Describing her record as always being “a shared experience”, that meant to be played in a room with friends, the comedic aspect of the album consists of Warren poking fun at traditional concepts of marriage and gender roles, noting the stress of married life and the loss of sexual freedom. The title track encourages women to express their sexuality, with Warren stating “we do have something to give” in regards to sexual topics in society.

== Reception ==
=== Commercial performance ===
The album was a commercial success. By the end of 1962, 1.5 million copies were sold, and it remained in top ten on the album charts for a year. Billboard 1963 edition listed Knockers Up! as one of the nation’s #1 comedy albums. The album debuted at no. 31 on November 7, 1960. Knockers Up! was the No. 6 album of the year.

=== Critical reception ===
Knockers Up! and Warren received a mixed reception as a whole. American columnist Dick Kleiner reflected on Warren's work by stating “Her material isn’t really blue - you might call it baby blue - it isn’t abnormal or sick,” while a negative review of Warren herself for Time magazine in 1963 stated that Warren and her audience “all seem at home in a barn.” Warren mentioned that she received the most support from the women audience and the "Knockers Up Club Members." They would come to see Warren's shows with their families and neighbors.

== Legacy/influence ==
Rusty Warren, as well as her album Knockers Up!, was known for leading the charge in the sexual revolution at the time. She is well known for her comedy and her musical numbers. Warren had a way of normalizing sexual topics like the intimate relationship of a married couple. She also exposed the new suburban way of life and its secrets. She left many people surprised and stunned by her style of comedy. Warren was groundbreaking in the fields of women's comedy and sexualized comedy. She used tactics like discussing certain situations in a brutally honest or sarcastic way to make her jokes. She would even call out the audience. When people heard her on stage use vulgar language with ease it left a lasting impression, paving the way for more adult comedy. She grew an impressive fan club mainly sprouting from the Knockers Up! March song. The fan club was a diverse group of people, 70,000 strong.

Warren later reflected on the creation of the Knockers Up! march:

I was telling the gals to 'get your knockers up' and let's show the guys we have something to give in this world today.

She started playing march encouraging women in the audience to lift their chests up as a sign of their power.

== Track listing ==
The following was the original track listing for the first vinyl pressing of the album in 1960.

Side one

No.	Title	Length
1.	"Red River Sally"
2.	"In The Family Way"

Side two

No.	Title	Length
3.	"Frankie and Johnny"
4.	"Knockers Up!"
5.	"You're Nobody Til Somebody Loves You"
