= This Is Hampton Hawes =

Studio album by Hampton Hawes Trio
- Released: Early May 1956
- Recorded: June 28 and December 3, 1955; January 25, 1956; Los Angeles Police Academy, Chavez Ravine; Contemporary's Studio, Los Angeles
- Genre: Jazz
- Length: 42:18
- Label: Contemporary; C3515
- Producer: Lester Koenig

Hampton Hawes chronology
| Hampton Hawes Trio (1955) | This Is Hampton Hawes (1956) | Everybody Likes Hampton Hawes (1956) |

This Is Hampton Hawes (subtitled Vol. 2, The Trio) is an album by pianist Hampton Hawes recorded at sessions in 1955 and 1956 and released on the Contemporary label.

== Reception ==
Professional ratings
Review scores
| Source | Rating |
|---|---|
| Allmusic | 4.5/5 stars |
| Disc | 3.5/5 stars |
| The Rolling Stone Jazz Record Guide | 3/5 stars |
| The Penguin Guide to Jazz Recordings | 4/4 stars |

The Allmusic review states "this Hampton Hawes date would certainly make good company for any other top jazz piano trio records in your collection".

== Track listing ==
1. "You and the Night and the Music" (Arthur Schwartz, Howard Dietz) - 3:45
2. "Stella by Starlight" (Victor Young, Ned Washington) - 4:52
3. "Blues for Jacque" (Hampton Hawes) - 4:34
4. "Yesterdays" (Jerome Kern, Otto Harbach) - 4:53
5. "Steeplechase" (Charlie Parker) - 2:51
6. "'Round About Midnight" (Thelonious Monk) - 5:21
7. "Just Squeeze Me" (Duke Ellington) - 6:31
8. "Autumn in New York" (Vernon Duke) - 5:19
9. "Section Blues" (Red Mitchell, Chuck Thompson) - 4:12
- Recorded at Los Angeles Police Academy in Chavez Ravine on June 28, 1955 (track 7) and at Contemporary's Studio in Los Angeles, California on December 3, 1955 (tracks 2, 4, 5, 8 & 9) and January 25, 1956 (tracks 1, 3 & 6)

== Personnel ==
- Hampton Hawes - piano
- Red Mitchell - bass
- Chuck Thompson - drums
