= What I Like =

What I Like may refer to:

- "What I Like", a 1986 song by dance music group Anthony and the Camp
- "What I Like", a 1993 song by 2 Live Crew from the album Deal with This
- "What I Like", a 2003 song by Gotthard from the album Human Zoo
- "What I Like" (Charli XCX song), from the album True Romance

== See also ==
- That's What I Like (disambiguation)
- What I Like About You (disambiguation)
- I Like What I Like, a 1997 album by the Bahamian musical group Baha Men
- "I Know What I Like", a 1987 song by Huey Lewis and the News released as a single from the album Fore!
- "What It's Like", a 1998 song by Everlast
