= Hampton Hawes Trio =

Studio album by Hampton Hawes Trio
- Released: 1955
- Recorded: June 28, 1955; Los Angeles Police Academy, Chavez Ravine, Los Angeles
- Genre: Jazz
- Length: 41:07
- Label: Contemporary; C 3505
- Producer: Lester Koenig

Hampton Hawes chronology
| Hampton Hawes Trio (1955) | This Is Hampton Hawes (1956) |

Hampton Hawes Trio (subtitled Vol. 1) is the debut album by pianist Hampton Hawes recorded in 1955 and released on the Contemporary label.

== Reception ==
Professional ratings
Review scores
| Source | Rating |
|---|---|
| AllMusic | 4.5/5 stars |
| The Rolling Stone Jazz Record Guide | 3/5 stars |
| The Penguin Guide to Jazz Recordings | 4/4 stars |

The AllMusic review by Scott Yanow states: "In addition to three of his basic originals, Hawes performs fresh and swinging versions of seven standards, making such overplayed tunes such as 'I Got Rhythm,' 'What Is This Thing Called Love?,' and 'All the Things You Are' really come alive. A gem, the first of many classic Hawes dates on Contemporary".

== Track listing ==
All compositions by Hampton Hawes except as indicated

1. "I Got Rhythm" (George Gershwin, Ira Gershwin) – 3:19
2. "What Is This Thing Called Love?" (Cole Porter) – 4:46
3. "Blues the Most" – 5:45
4. "So in Love" (Porter) – 3:58
5. "Feelin' Fine" – 3:04
6. "Hamp's Blues" – 3:42
7. "Easy Living" (Ralph Rainger, Leo Robin) – 4:50
8. "All the Things You Are" (Jerome Kern, Oscar Hammerstein II) – 4:59
9. "These Foolish Things" (Holt Marvell, Harry Link, Jack Strachey) – 4:50
10. "Carioca" (Vincent Youmans, Edward Eliscu, Gus Kahn) – 2:24

== Personnel ==
- Hampton Hawes – piano
- Red Mitchell – bass (tracks 1–3 & 5–10)
- Chuck Thompson – drums (tracks 1–3 & 5–10)
