= Lorraine Geller =

American jazz musician

- Born: Lorraine Winifred Walsh; September 11, 1928; Portland, Oregon, United States
- Died: October 13, 1958 (aged 30); Los Angeles, California
- Occupation: Musician
- Spouse: Herb Geller (m. 1951-1958; her death)
- Children: 1

Lorraine Winifred Geller (née Walsh; September 11, 1928 – October 13, 1958) was an American jazz pianist.

Geller was born in Portland, Oregon on September 11, 1928. She started out with the all-female big band Sweethearts of Rhythm, based in New York. She met saxophonist Herb Geller, and married him in 1951. Together they moved to Los Angeles, where they played with many musicians on the West Coast jazz scene, such as Shorty Rogers, Zoot Sims, Stan Getz, and Red Mitchell; she also did sessions with Charlie Parker and Dizzy Gillespie. In 1957, she accompanied Kay Starr. The following year, she concentrated on bringing up her daughter, so did not often perform, but she did play at the first Monterey Jazz Festival. On October 13, 1958, Lorraine Geller died in Los Angeles; this has been attributed to heart failure or pulmonary infection.

== Discography ==
=== As leader/co-leader ===
- The Gellers (EmArcy, 1955)
- Lorraine Geller at the Piano (Dot, 1959, recorded 1954)

=== As sidewoman ===
With Maynard Ferguson

- Around the Horn with Maynard Ferguson (EmArcy, 1956)

With Herb Geller

- Herb Geller Plays (Emarcy, 1954) – with Leroy Vinnegar bass, Larance Marable percussion)
- The Herb Geller Sextette, Mercury (with e.g. Conte Candoli, Red Mitchell, 1955)

With Red Mitchell

- Presenting Red Mitchell (Contemporary, 1957)

With others

- Miles Davis At Last : Miles Davis And The Lighthouse All Stars (Contemporary, 1953 [1985])
- Chet Baker, Miles Davis Complete performances with Lighthouse All Stars (Jazz Factory, 2004) – Lorraine Geller only present on the Miles Davis tracks
