= Carl Frederick Tandberg =

American bassist

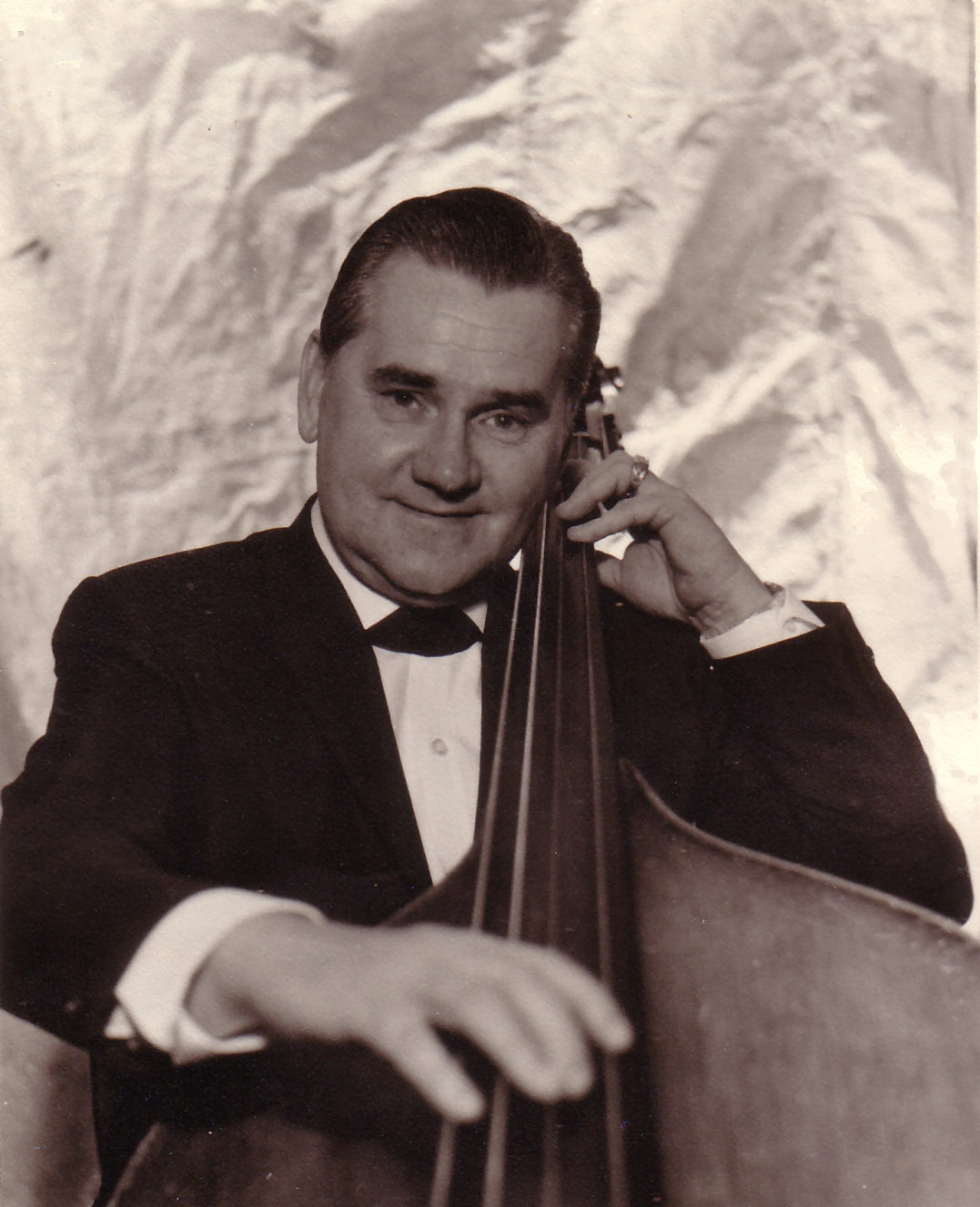
- Tandberg circa 1950-1960

Background information
- Born: March 22, 1910; Boston, Massachusetts
- Died: August 26, 1988 (aged 78) Los Angeles, California
- Genres: Jazz, big band, country music
- Instrument: Bass fiddle
- Years active: 1926-1970s

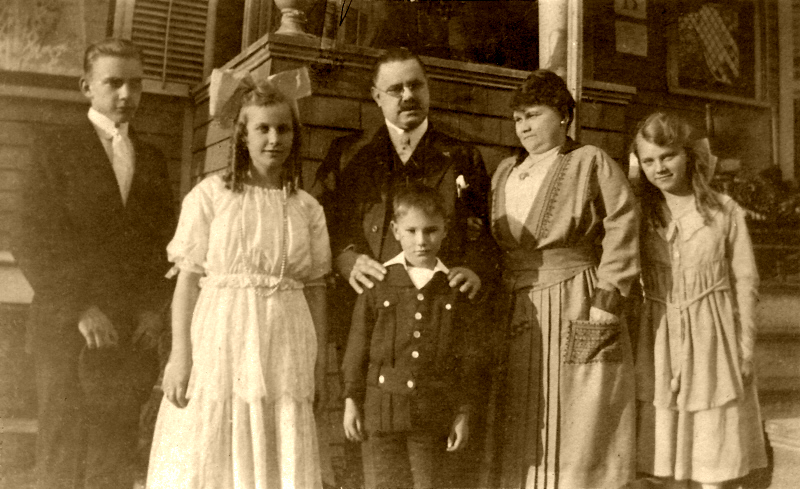
Tandberg in front of his father in 1918

Carl Frederick Tandberg (March 22, 1910 – August 26, 1988), was an American bassist who recorded with Glen Campbell and Frankie Ortega.

== Biography ==
He was born on March 22, 1910, in Dorchester, Boston where his father, Thorvald Martin Tandberg I (1874–1970), managed a restaurant. Thorvald was born in Portland, Maine. Carl's mother was Alvilde Marie Naess (1875–1933) of Oslo, Norway. His maternal uncle was Alfred Næss, the Norwegian speedskater.

His music career began in Boston in 1926 where he played in local ballrooms, restaurants and in radio stations WNAC and WEEI. Carl married Alice Nazian Gonyer (1909–1992) of Orono, Maine in 1929. They moved to Queens, New York where he played with the Jimmy Durante band, played vaudeville and toured the southern circuit with Al Wohlman & Company. He played 52nd street "jazz joints" and worked with Mike Riley and Ed Farley, the writers of The Music Goes Round and Round. He worked with Shep Fields (1910–1981) and His Rippling Rhythm Orchestra; and The Jerry Blaine (1910–1973) Orchestra in 1937. He played some college concerts with Bunny Berigan, and in 1939 he did a vaudeville tour and recorded with The Andrews Sisters. In 1947 he recorded Miserlou with Jan August. Around 1948 he moved to California and worked with the Frankie Ortega Trio in Las Vegas and at the Balboa Bay Club in Newport Beach for 11 years. He moved to Burbank, California and, starting in 1957–1958, worked as a musician in Alhambra, California at Dick White's Rickey's Lounge with the Paul Peters Trio. The trio was himself, Paul Peters, and Stan Seltzer. He later became the maître d' at Rickey's Lounge restaurant. While working at American Music Publishers he met Glen Campbell and collaborated on several recordings. After he retired from music he worked for a private security company at KTTV studios. He later worked as the gate security guard at the home of Bob Hope.

He died in Los Angeles, California on August 26, 1988, of a heart attack, and was buried in Eternal Valley Memorial Park.

== Discography ==
- Glen Campbell; The Legacy, 1961–2002 (LP rereleased 2003)
- Frankie Ortega and His Group; Imperial IR 9025 (LP circa 1950)
  - Frankie Ortega, piano
  - Al Viola, guitar
  - Carl Tandberg, bass
  - Walter Sage, drums
  - Tito Rivera, conga drums
- Al Viola and Tito Rivera. The Piano Styling Of Frankie Ortega (LP)
- Eddie Cochran; The Ballads of Eddie Cochran (2013) playing standup bass
- Eddie Cochran; Somethin' Else: The Ultimate Collection (2009) playing upright bass
