= Ken Rice =

Ken Rice may refer to:

- Ken Rice (American football) (1939–2020), former American football offensive tackle
- Spider Webb (jazz drummer) (born 1944), real name Kenneth Rice
