= Bruz Freeman =

American jazz musician

- Also known as: "Buzz", "Bruz"
- Born: Eldridge Freeman; November 8, 1921; Chicago, Illinois, U.S.
- Died: 2006 (aged 84–85)
- Genre: Jazz
- Occupation: Musician
- Instrument: Drums

Eldridge Freeman (August 11, 1921 – 2006), also known as "Buzz" Freeman or "Bruz" Freeman, was an American jazz drummer.

== Biography ==
Born in Chicago, with his brothers, guitarist George Freeman and tenor saxophonist Von Freeman, he played for several years in the house band at the Pershing Hotel. He was also the uncle of Chico Freeman, the son of Von Freeman.

In 1950, he was a member of John Young's trio with LeRoy Jackson on bass, and recorded with Young's orchestra backing vocalist Lurlean Hunter.

In the mid-1950s, he was a member of the Hampton Hawes Quartet, with Red Mitchell and Jim Hall, and with line-ups led by Herb Geller. In 1950, with his brothers George and Von (originally misidentified as Claude McLin), LeRoy Jackson, and Chris Anderson, he played with Charlie Parker shortly before his death, at a jam session recorded at Bird's apartment which was released in 1960 by Savoy.

In 1977–78, he joined a short-lived band based in California, led by Kenny Mann and with Britt Woodman on trombone.

== Discography ==
=== As sideman ===
- 1955: Herb Geller Plays – Herb Geller (EmArcy MG-36045)
- 1956 All Night Session! Vol. 1, All Night Session! Vol. 2, All Night Session! Vol. 3 - Hampton Hawes (Contemporary)
- 1957: Gal with a Horn – Clora Bryant (Mode Records Mod-LP-106)
- 1960: An Evening At Home With The Bird – Charlie Parker (Savoy Records MG-12152)
- 1969: Head Start – Bob Thiele Emergency (Flying Dutchman FDS-104)
- 1969: Flight for Four – John Carter & Bobby Bradford Quartet (Flying Dutchman FDS 108)
- 1969: Seeking – John Carter & Bobby Bradford
- 1970: Self Determination Music − John Carter / Bobby Bradford (Flying Dutchman)
