= Hudec =

Hudec (feminine: Hudcová or Hudecová) is a Czech and Slovak surname. Notable people with the surname include:

- Alois Hudec (1908–1997), Czech gymnast
- Frank Hudec, American drummer
- Jan Hudec (born 1981), Czech alpine skier
- Jiří Hudec (born 1964), Czech hurdler
- Jiří Hudec (composer) (1923–1996), Czech composer, conductor and organist
- Ladislav Hudec (footballer) (born 1957), Slovak football player
- Roman Hudec (born 1986), Slovak football manager
- László Hudec (1893–1958), Hungarian-Slovak architect active in Shanghai
- Majel Leigh Hudec (1932–2008), (Majel Barrett-Roddenberry). Majel was an American actress who married Star Trek creator Gene Roddenberry. She was best known for her roles as various characters in the Star Trek franchise like Christine Chapel and Lwaxana Troi.
- Martin Hudec (footballer) (born 1982), Czech footballer
- Martin Hudec (rally driver) (born 1980), Czech rally driver
- Martina Hudcová (born 1966), Czech beach volleyball player
- Romana Hudecová (born 1993), Slovak volleyball player
- Stanislav Hudec (born 1982), Slovak ice hockey player

== See also ==
- 15399 Hudec, main-belt asteroid
- Majel Barrett (born Hudec)
