= Frank Hudec =

American drummer

- Born: Cicero, Illinois, U.S.
- Genres: Jazz
- Instrument: drums
- Years active: 1950s-1970s

Frank Hudec (born c. 1927) was an American drummer who was part of the Stan Seltzer Trio. He recorded on Decca Records. He was born in Cicero, Illinois and studied with Frank Pechl and played with Al Hirt.

== Stan Seltzer Trio ==
- Stan Seltzer, piano
- Red Mitchell, bass
- Frank Hudec, drums

== Discography ==
- Our Man in New Orleans
  - Al Hirt, trumpet
  - Frank Hudec, drums
- Al Hirt at the Mardi Gras (1962)
  - Al Hirt, trumpet
  - Frank Hudec, drums
