= Everybody Likes Hampton Hawes =

Studio album by Hampton Hawes Trio
- Released: 1956
- Recorded: January 25, 1956
- Studio: Contemporary's Studio in Los Angeles, California
- Genre: Jazz
- Length: 43:42
- Label: Contemporary C3523
- Producer: Lester Koenig

Hampton Hawes chronology
This Is Hampton Hawes (1956)	Everybody Likes Hampton Hawes (1956)	All Night Session! Vol. 1 (1956)

Everybody Likes Hampton Hawes (subtitled Vol. 3: The Trio) is the third album by pianist Hampton Hawes recorded in 1956 and released on the Contemporary label.

== Reception ==
Professional ratings
Review scores
Source	Rating
Allmusic	3/5 stars
The Rolling Stone Jazz Record Guide	3/5 stars
Tom Hull	B+
The Penguin Guide to Jazz Recordings	3.5/4 stars

The Allmusic review by Scott Yanow states that Hawes "comes up with consistently creative ideas throughout this swinging bop date".

== Track listing ==
All compositions by Hampton Hawes except as indicated

1. "Somebody Loves Me" (George Gershwin, Buddy DeSylva, Ballard MacDonald) - 5:32
2. "The Sermon" - 3:42
3. "Embraceable You" (George Gershwin, Ira Gershwin) - 4:58
4. "I Remember You" (Victor Schertzinger, Johnny Mercer) - 4:28
5. "A Night in Tunisia" (Dizzy Gillespie) - 3:54
6. "Lover, Come Back to Me/Bean and the Boys" (Sigmund Romberg, Oscar Hammerstein II; Coleman Hawkins) - 5:13
7. "Polka Dots and Moonbeams" (Jimmy Van Heusen, Johnny Burke) - 4:42
8. "Billy Boy" (Traditional) - 3:01
9. "Body and Soul" (Johnny Green, Frank Eyton, Edward Heyman, Robert Sour) - 4:17
10. "Coolin' the Blues" - 4:18

== Personnel ==
- Hampton Hawes - piano
- Red Mitchell - bass
- Chuck Thompson - drums
