= The Banker's Private Room, Negotiating a Loan =

Painting by John Callcott Horsley

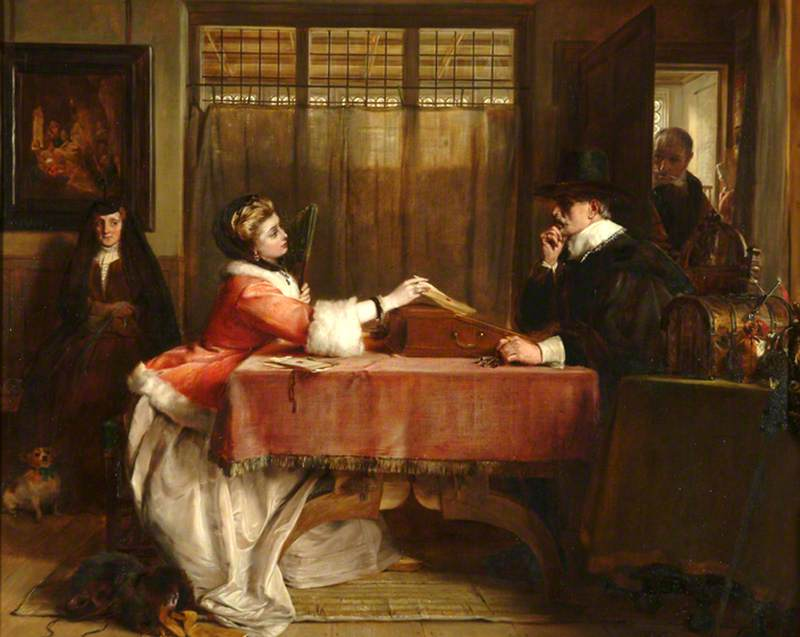
- Artist: John Callcott Horsley
- Year: 1870
- Type: Oil on canvas, genre painting
- Dimensions: 101.5 cm × 126.9 cm (40.0 in × 50.0 in)
- Location: Royal Holloway College, Surrey

'The Banker's Private Room, Negotiating a Loan is an 1870 oil painting by the British artist John Callcott Horsley. historical genre painting it depicts a scene in a banker's office during the Seventeenth century. The Puritan banker is faced with the vivacious appeal of an attractive young woman seeking a loan Her chaperone casts a wry, sideways glance as if judging how susceptible the banker is to her approach.

Horsley was a member of Cranbrook Colony of artists and was celebrated for his scenes of everyday Victorian life, although the period setting for this nods to the genre painters of the Dutch Golden Age who he massively admired. The painting was displayed at the Royal Academy Exhibition of 1870 at Burlington House in London. Horsley considered it one of his best works and it was widely praised by critics. In 1883 it was bought by the art collector Thomas Holloway who donated it to Royal Holloway College.

== Bibliography ==
- Chapel, Jeannie. Victorian Taste: The Complete Catalogue of Paintings at the Royal Holloway College. A. Zwemmer, 1982
- Cowling, Mary (ed.) Paintings From the Reign of Queen Victoria: The Royal Holloway Collection, London. Art Services International, 2008.
- Thompson, Carol (ed.) The Cranbrook Colony: Fresh Perspectives. Wolverhampton Art Gallery, 2010.
