= I'm All Smiles =

I'm All Smiles may refer to:

- "I'm All Smiles", a song written by Michael Leonard and Herbert Martin for the 1965 Broadway musical The Yearling
- I'm All Smiles (Hampton Hawes album), recorded in 1966 and released in 1973 featuring the above
- I'm All Smiles (Hank Jones and Tommy Flanagan album), recorded in 1983 featuring the above
