= Sermon (disambiguation) =

A sermon is an oration by a prophet or member of the clergy.

Sermon may also refer to:

== People ==
- Sermon (ruler), 11th-century ruler of Srem, vassal of Samuil of Bulgaria
- Erick Sermon (born 1968), American hip hop musician and record producer
- François Sermon (1923–2013), Belgian footballer
- Isabella Sermon (born 2006), English actress
- Paul Sermon (born 1966), Professor of Creative Technologies at Salford University, England
- R. R. Sermon (Raymond Rollins Sermon; 1893–1965), American college football and basketball player and coach
- Trey Sermon (Born 1999), American football player
- Wayne Sermon (born 1984), American rock musician and record producer, lead guitarist for the pop rock band Imagine Dragons
- Brandon Sermons (born 1991), American football player

== Music ==
- The Sermon (Jimmy Smith album), 1959 jazz album by Jimmy Smith
- The Sermon (Hampton Hawes album) 1987 album of 1958 tapes
- "A Sermon", a song by The Police
- "Sermon", a song by Drowning Pool from Sinner
- "Sermon", a song by James Arthur from Back from the Edge
- The Sermon (band), a rock band from Syracuse, New York

== Other ==
- "The Sermon", story by Haim Hazaz
- "The Sermon", 1975, Season 4 Episode 1 of The Waltons
