= Presenting Red Mitchell =

Studio album by Red Mitchell
- Released: 1957
- Recorded: March 26, 1957; Los Angeles, California
- Genre: Jazz
- Length: 42:51
- Label: Contemporary C 3538/S 7538
- Producer: Lester Koenig

Red Mitchell chronology
| Red Mitchell (1956) | Presenting Red Mitchell (1957) | Get Those Elephants Out'a Here (1958) |

Presenting Red Mitchell is an album by American jazz bassist Red Mitchell recorded in 1957 and released on the Contemporary label.

== Reception ==
The Allmusic review by Scott Yanow states "Bassist Red Mitchell, who had led two fairly obscure sessions for Bethlehem in 1955, came up with a gem on his lone Contemporary set as a leader ...the music is strictly high-quality modern mainstream bop of the era. Easily recommended to collectors of straight-ahead jazz".

Professional ratings
Review scores
| Source | Rating |
|---|---|
| Allmusic | 4/5 stars |
| The Rolling Stone Jazz Record Guide | 3/5 stars |
| The Penguin Guide to Jazz Recordings | 3.5/4 stars |

== Track listing ==
1. "Scrapple from the Apple" (Charlie Parker) - 5:27
2. "Rainy Night" (Red Mitchell) - 5:20
3. "I Thought of You" (Mitchell) - 5:17
4. "Out of the Blue" (Miles Davis) - 6:15
5. "Paul's Pal" (Sonny Rollins) - 6:55
6. "Sandu" (Clifford Brown) - 5:31
7. "Cheek to Cheek" (Irving Berlin) - 8:06

== Personnel ==
- Red Mitchell - bass
- James Clay - tenor saxophone, flute
- Lorraine Geller - piano
- Billy Higgins - drums
