= Chaperone =

Chaperone or Chaperon may refer to:

- Chaperone (social) or chaperon, a person who accompanies or supervises young people on social occasions
- Chaperone (clinical), a person who acts as a witness during a medical examination or procedure
- Chaperon (headgear), a form of hood or hat worn in Western Europe in the Middle Ages

== Biology ==
- Chaperone (protein), a protein that assists non-covalent folding/unfolding
- Co-chaperone, a protein that assists a chaperone in protein folding and other functions
- Pharmacological chaperone, a molecule which stabilizes protein folding, used in treatment for loss of function
- Chaperone-mediated autophagy, a selective type of autophagy
- MEAI or "Chaperon", a pharmaceutical drug used as a safer alternative to alcohol

== People ==
- Bob Chaperon (1958–2026), a retired Canadian snooker and billiards player
- Nicolas Chaperon (died 1656), a French painter, draughtsman and engraver
- Philippe Chaperon (1823–1907), a French scenographer

== Media ==
- The Chaperone (2011 film)
- The Chaperone (2018 film)
- Chaperone (2024 film), directed by Zoe Eisenberg
- The Chaperones (upcoming film)
- "The Chaperone" (Seinfeld)
- "The Chaperone" (SpongeBob SquarePants)
- "The Chaperone" (The Monkees)
- The Chaperones, a doo wop group

== See also ==
- Chaperonin
