= Frankie Ortega =

American jazz musician

Frankie Ortega (November 11, 1927 – February 7, 1994) was an American jazz piano player and bandleader with the Frankie Ortega Trio during the 1950s and 1960s.

== Biography ==
Ortega released Swingin' Abroad on Jubilee Records in 1958 and he composed the theme music for the TV series King of Diamonds in 1961. He may be best remembered for the trio's frequent appearances as the house band at Dino's Lodge on 77 Sunset Strip.

== Discography ==
- Twilight Time (1957)
- Twinkling Pinkies (1958)
- Swingin' Abroad (1958)
- At the Ember's (1958)
- Keyboard Caravan (Imperial, 1959)
- 77 Sunset Strip (1959)
- The Piano Styling of Frankie Ortega (Imperial, 1959)
- The Frankie Ortega Trio at Dino's (Warner Bros., 1959)
- Smokin' (Dobre, 1978)

== Frankie Ortega Trio ==
- Frankie Ortega
- Carl Frederick Tandberg (1910–1988), bass
