= The Ray-O-Vacs =

American R&B vocal group

The Ray-O-Vacs were an American, New Jersey-based R&B vocal group of the 1940s and 1950s which recorded for Jubilee Records and Decca, among others. The name was after a battery brand.

Group members included Lester Harris (vocals) later replaced by Herb Milliner, Jackson "Flap" McQueen (bass, leader), Joe Crump (piano) and saxophonist Leoparte "Chink" Kinney, whose typical style highly contributed to the group's sound. On their song "Party Time" the vocal was done by Bill Walker.

Their first four releases were for the Coleman label in 1949, and in 1950 the still unknown group signed with Decca where they got some releases on their 48000 Rhythm & Blues series. Of these, their version of the originally Mexican pop standard "Besame mucho" is most remembered, not in the least due to a 1989 re-issue album on the Danish Official label with the same title.

Despite their contract with a major record label their records did not sell in commercial terms, and in the end of 1952 Decca dropped the group. They moved to Jubilee Records. Their failure to sell records contrasted with a readers poll in The Pittsburgh Courier, a respected African American newspaper, in May 1953, where the Ray-O-Vacs were picked out as best small combo, beating out competition of Paul Gayten and Louis Jordan.

Their last releases were in 1957 with the Kaiser label.
