= Mingus Three =

Studio album by Charles Mingus
- Released: Early November 1957
- Recorded: July 9, 1957; New York City
- Genre: Jazz
- Label: Jubilee; JLP 1054

Charles Mingus chronology
The Clown (1957)	Mingus Three (1957)	East Coasting (1957)

Mingus Three (also referred to as Trio) is an album by American bassist, composer and bandleader Charles Mingus with pianist Hampton Hawes and drummer Dannie Richmond which was recorded in 1957 and first released on the Jubilee label.

== Reception ==
Professional ratings
Review scores
Source	Rating
Allmusic	3/5 stars
The Penguin Guide to Jazz Recordings	3/4 stars

The Allmusic review stated, "Most often heard in large ensembles and rarely in a trio context, Charles Mingus joined forces with pianist Hampton Hawes for this 1957 studio date. It features four standards, two originals by the bassist, and a jam by the group credited to Hawes. While there's nothing particularly arresting or startling about the date, the relationship between the two ostensible co-leaders is a good case study in group dynamics when deference between two strong-willed individualists turns into a certain amount of compromise. Drummer Danny Richmond is not so much the peacemaker or even mediator, and he is the one with the most common sense who actually pulls this triad into a simpatico unit, cooling the embers with his steady, willful-in-its-own-right playing. As complex as the music of Mingus tends to be, it's nice to hear what he does in a more simplified area. His "Back Home Blues" is so basic as his bass leads out, while the Mingus chart "Dizzy Moods" is deeper within an easier swing, allowing darker colors to fully but slowly blossom. Richmond overdubs the tambourine on "Dizzy Moods" and the hip "A Night in Tunisia"-styled take of "Summertime," while a faster "Hamp's New Blues" bops along effortlessly, chided by the drummer's accents. Hawes shines in his gilded, rearranged concept of "Yesterdays," intentionally messing up the changes for the first few bars before settling in, while slowing the Vernon Duke evergreen "I Can't Get Started" (always a personal staple of the Mingus book) to a crawl. The most intriguing selection comes at the end, as "Laura" sounds derived from "Tea for Two," with the hardy upright of Mingus sallying forth about this imaginary woman made real through this poignant song. Some six years later, Mingus, Duke Ellington, and Max Roach would record the controversial trio effort Money Jungle, so in many ways this album is a prelude to that all-star combination, both one-shots and definitely sidebars to the careers of all of these brilliant jazzmen."

== Track listing ==
All compositions by Charles Mingus except as indicated

1. "Yesterdays" (Otto Harbach, Jerome Kern) - 4:13
2. "Back Home Blues" - 5:29
3. "I Can't Get Started" (Vernon Duke, Ira Gershwin) - 6:28
4. "Hamp's New Blues" (Hampton Hawes) - 3:52
5. "Summertime" (George Gershwin, Ira Gershwin, DuBose Heyward) - 4:28
6. "Dizzy Moods" - 6:51
7. "Laura" (Johnny Mercer, David Raksin) - 6:33

== Personnel ==
- Charles Mingus - bass
- Hampton Hawes - piano
- Dannie Richmond - drums, tambourine (overdubbed)
