= Northern Windows =

1974 album by Hampton Hawes

Studio album by Hampton Hawes
- Released: 1974
- Recorded: July 18–19, 1974
- Studio: Fantasy Studios, Berkeley, California
- Genre: Jazz
- Length: 33:33
- Label: Prestige; PR 10088
- Producer: David Axelrod

Hampton Hawes chronology
Playin' in the Yard (1973)	Northern Windows (1974)	Hampton Hawes Live at the Great American Music Hall (1974)

Northern Windows is an album by jazz pianist and keyboardist Hampton Hawes recorded for the Prestige label in 1974.

== Reception ==
Professional ratings
Review scores
Source	Rating
Allmusic	4/5 stars

The Allmusic site awarded the album 4 stars.

== Track listing ==
All compositions by Hampton Hawes except as indicated

1. "Sierra Morena" - 3:52
2. "Go Down Moses" (Traditional) - 6:29
3. "Bach" - 2:59
4. "Web" - 3:32
5. "Tune Axle Grease" - 5:05
6. "C & H Sugar" - 11:36

== Personnel ==
- Hampton Hawes - piano, electric piano
- Allen DeRienzo, Snooky Young - trumpet
- George Bohanon - trombone
- Bill Green, Jackie Kelso, Jay Migliori - saxophones, flute
- Carol Kaye - electric bass
- Spider Webb - drums
- David Axelrod - arranger, conductor
