= All Life Records =

French jazz record label

All Life Records was a French jazz record label.

== Discography ==
- 001: Christian Escoudé & Charlie Haden – Gitane
- 002: Jimmy Rowles– Red 'n' Me
- 003: Burton Greene – The Past Is Also in the Future
- 004: Cat Anderson – Old Folks
- 005: Bud Freeman – Satin Doll
- 006: Christian Escoudé – Gousti
- 007: Chet Baker – Two a Day
- 008: Eddie "Lockjaw" Davis & Harry Edison – All of Me
- 010: Daniel Humair, Eddy Louiss & Jean-Luc Ponty – HLP
- 012: Maurice Vander – Philly
- 013: Eddy Louiss – Blue Tempo
- 015: Daniel Humair, Eddy Louiss & Jean-Luc Ponty – Last Set
- 017: John Lewis – Piano, Paris 1979
