= Rusty Warren =

American comedian and singer (1930–2021)

- Born: Ilene Goldman; March 20, 1930; New York City, New York, U.S.
- Died: May 25, 2021 (aged 91); Laguna Hills, California, U.S.
- Occupations: Comedian, singer
- Website: www.rustywarren.com

Rusty Warren (born Ilene Goldman; March 20, 1930 – May 25, 2021) was an American comedian and singer, specializing in sex-related themes and such songs as "Bounce Your Boobies" and "Knockers Up!".

== Early life ==
Warren was born in New York City in 1930 and adopted six months later by Helen and Herbert Goldman, a couple from Milton, Massachusetts, who named her Ilene Goldman. She graduated from Milton High School around 1948, studied piano at the New England Conservatory of Music, graduating around 1954, and later taught there briefly after obtaining her degree. She spent her first free summer entertaining in small lounges. Her musical mentor at the time was Arthur Fiedler, the conductor of the Boston Pops.

"Late at night, there’d be nobody in these places (cocktail lounges in the Boston area), to cut the boredom, I got some repartee going with the regulars."

== Career ==
In 1955, Warren began at The Pomp Room, at 16th Street and Camelback Road, Phoenix, AZ. Songs for Sinners was recorded there, for Jubilee Records, and released in November 1958. Knockers Up! was recorded at The Golden Falcon, Pompano Beach, Florida, and released in November 1960.

GNP Crescendo Records reissued some of her Jubilee albums. Known as the "Knockers Up Gal", she has been called the "mother of the sexual revolution". Her career began in the early 1950s in Phoenix, Arizona. Later she moved her act to Las Vegas, Nevada. Her comedy routines exposed the subject of sex from a female perspective. Her most famous contribution to the sexual revolution was the song "Knockers Up" from the 1960 album of the same name.

== Personal life ==
Her life partner was Elizabeth Rizzo from 1984 to 2019 and they resided in Hawaii after moving from Paradise Valley, Arizona.

Rusty Warren died in her sleep on May 25, 2021, at the age of 91.

== Legacy ==
The Rusty Warren collection, with news articles, photographs, slides, video footage from her Las Vegas shows, magazines, promotional materials, letters, performance contracts, handwritten notes, pertaining to her career as a comedian, spanning from 1955 through the late 1980s, is in the archives of the Library of Congress and on display at the National Comedy Museum.

Second City Television comedian Catherine O'Hara performed a character called Dusty Towne who was based on Warren.

Warren’s song “Bounce Your Boobies” was regularly used by left-wing radio show hostess Randi Rhodes to open her Friday shows on Air America radio in the early 2000’s.

In 2016, Elizabeth Rizzo self-published Rusty Warren - The Knockers Up Gal, containing excerpts from news articles and magazine articles in chronological order.

== Discography ==
=== Albums ===
- Songs for Sinners – Jubilee JGM 2024 (1959)
- Knockers Up! – Jubilee JGM 2029 (1960)
- Sin-sational – Jubilee JGM 2034 (1961)
- Rusty Warren Bounces Back – Jubilee JGM 2039 (1961)
- Rusty Warren in Orbit – Jubilee JGM 2044 (1962)
- Banned in Boston? – Jubilee JGM 2049 (1963)
- Sex-x-ponent – Jubilee JGM 2054 (1964)
- Rusty Sings a Portrait of Life – Jubilee JGS 5025 (1964)
- More Knockers Up! – Jubilee JGM 2059 (1965)
- Rusty Rides Again – Jubilee JGM 2064 (1967)
- Bottoms Up! – Jubilee JGM 2069 (1969)
- Look What I Got for You – Jubilee JGS 2074 (1969)
- Lays It on the Line – GNP-Crescendo GNPS-2081 (1974)
- Knockers Up '76 – GNP-Crescendo GNPS-2088 (1976)
- Sexplosion – GNP-Crescendo GNPS-2114 (1977)

=== Reissued albums ===
- Knockers Up! / Songs For Sinners – GNP-Crescendo GNP 2-2079 1973 (reissue of Jubilee JGM 2029 and JGM 2024)
- Bounces Back / Sin-sational – GNP-Crescendo GNP 2-2080 1973 (reissue of Jubilee JGM 2039 and JGM 2034)
- Bottoms Up! – GNP-Crescendo GNPS-2103 (1976) (reissue of Jubilee JGM 2069)

=== Singles ===
- "Knockers Up" / "Basin Street" / "Bounce Your Boobies" / "Shimmy Like My Sister Kate" – Jubilee 45-2039 (1961)
- "Roll Me Over" / Do It Now / "Twist Blues" – Jubilee 45-2049 (1962)
- "I Like Everybody" / "Waltz Me Around Again Willie" / "Greenback Dollar" / "The Sexy Life" – Jubilee 45-2059 (1963)
- "The Pill Song" / "Surprise" / "Red River Sally" / "Steel Drivin' Man" – Jubilee 45-2069 (1964)

=== DVD ===
Label GNP Crescendo produced a DVD that chronicles her life in show business. The DVD, Rusty Warren: Knockers Up! The Lady Behind the Laughs, was released by GNP Crescendo in 2008.
