= All Night Session! Vol. 2 =

Studio album by Hampton Hawes Quartet
- Released: 1958
- Recorded: November 12–13, 1956
- Studio: Contemporary's Studio in Los Angeles, California
- Genre: Jazz
- Length: 39:00
- Label: Contemporary
- Producer: Lester Koenig

Hampton Hawes chronology
| All Night Session! Vol. 1 (1956) | All Night Session! Vol. 2 (1958) | All Night Session! Vol. 3 (1956) |

All Night Session! Vol. 2 is the second album by pianist Hampton Hawes from a session recorded the night of November 12/13, 1956 at Contemporary's Studios in Los Angeles and released on the Contemporary label.

== Reception ==
Professional ratings
Review scores
| Source | Rating |
|---|---|
| Allmusic | 4.5/5 stars |
| The Rolling Stone Jazz Record Guide | 3/5 stars |
| Tom Hull | B+ |
| The Penguin Guide to Jazz Recordings | 3.5/4 stars |

The Allmusic review states "In 1958 Hawes was quoted as saying "It's hard to put into words how good it feels to play jazz when it's really swinging...I've reached a point where the music fills you up so much emotionally that you feel like shouting hallelujah -- like people do in church when they're converted to God. That's the way I was feeling the night we recorded All Night Session!" ".

== Track listing ==
Side one
| No. | Title | Writer(s) | Length |
|---|---|---|---|
| 1. | "I'll Remember April" | Don Raye; Gene de Paul; Patricia Johnston | 7:02 |
| 2. | "I Should Care" | Axel Stordahl; Paul Weston; Sammy Cahn | 4:23 |
| 3. | "Woody 'n' You" | Dizzy Gillespie | 5:41 |
| 4. | "Two Bass Hit" | Gillespie; John Lewis | 2:50 |

Side two
| No. | Title | Writer(s) | Length |
|---|---|---|---|
| 1. | "Will You Still Be Mine?" | Matt Dennis; Tom Adair | 6:55 |
| 2. | "April in Paris" | Vernon Duke; Yip Harburg | 7:30 |
| 3. | "Blue 'n' Boogie" | Gillespie; Frank Paparelli | 8:11 |
| Total length: | | | 39:00 |

== Personnel ==
- Hampton Hawes – piano
- Jim Hall – guitar
- Red Mitchell – bass
- Eldridge Freeman – drums
