= Tedd Browne =

American singer-songwriter (1929–1968)

Tedd Browne (August 23, 1929 in Estill, South Carolina – July 27, 1968 in Cleveland Heights, Ohio) was an American singer songwriter. He was shot and killed while returning from a gig.

Browne graduated from high school in Brooklyn, NY, attended Hastings College in Nebraska, and San Francisco College. He lived in Savannah, Georgia, New York City, NY, Lake George, New York, and Cleveland, Ohio; he served in the US Navy.

Browne appeared on The Tonight Show starring Jack Paar and The Mike Douglas Show. On January 20, 1965, he sang at President Lyndon B. Johnson’s inaugural ball. He was married to Inez Browne and had three children.

In 1968 Browne was shot and killed while stopped at a traffic light while returning from a gig at the Cabaret Lounge; Billboard attributed his killing to earlier rioting in Cleveland that week. According to the book Cleveland Heights: Making of an Urban Suburb, "The shooting of black folk singer Tedd Browne in July 1968 at the intersection of Cedar and South Overlook Roads was also racially inspired; his convicted killer had carved an "N" on his bullet for "the first n----- to come up Cedar Hill." (page 126)

== Albums ==
- Tedd Browne Sings - LP (Label - Jubilee Records, Catalog # JLP-1031) - 1957
- Tedd Browne Sings - LP (Label - National Recording Corporation, Rome, Georgia, Catalog # LPA3) - 1959
- Suave Folk Music for Fancy Functions - LP (Label - National Recording Corporation, Rome, Georgia, Catalog # NRC LPA-3 ) - 1958
- Savannah Musical Portrait - LP (Label - Capo Records, Cleveland, Ohio - Catalog # MB 343) - 1961
- Scarlet Ribbon - LP (Label - Capo Records, Cleveland, Ohio - Catalog # PB-1276 PB-1277) - 196?
- Lake George Musical Portrait - LP (Label - Garnet Record Company, Catalog # GR-101) - 1964
- Lake George Musical Portrait - CD (Label - Weedgie Music, Schenectady, New York) - 2008
- LBJ Musical Portrait - LP (Label - Garnet Record Company, Catalog # GR-102 ) - 1965
- LBJ Musical Portrait - CD (Label - Weedgie Music, Schenectady, New York Catalog # 625989565625 ) - 2008
- This Little Light of Mine - LP ( Label - Rite Record Productions Inc., Catalog # 22825/6) - 1968

== Singles ==
- The Everglades (B-Side - A Corner in Paradise) - 7"/45 (Label - Capitol Records, Catalog # F 4225) - 1959
