= Gitane (album) =

Studio album by Charlie Haden and Christian Escoudé
- Released: 1979
- Recorded: September 22, 1978
- Studio: Studio Des Champs-Elysees, Paris, France
- Genre: Jazz
- Length: 40:37
- Label: All Life
- Producer: Alain Boucanus, Eymeric Adam

Charlie Haden chronology
As Long as There's Music (1978)	Gitane (1979)	Magico (1980)

Gitane is an album by American jazz bassist Charlie Haden and French gypsy jazz guitarist Christian Escoudé, released in 1979. Most of the album's compositions were written by guitarist Django Reinhardt.

== Critical reception ==
Professional ratings
Review scores
Source	Rating
AllMusic	3/5 stars
The Penguin Guide to Jazz	2.5/4 stars

The Globe and Mail wrote that Haden "is in fact slow a-finger; by emphasis and omission he makes each note count... Once, and finally, he gets the music moving—the tune is Django's 'Dinette'—Escoude comes to life, and Reinhardt with him."

The AllMusic review by Brian Olewnick stated: "A warm, unhurried session, one that Haden fans will enjoy for both his prominence and creativity as well as for Escoude's carefully considered contributions".

== Track listing ==
All tracks are written by Django Reinhardt except where noted.

No.	Title	Writer(s)	Length
1.	"Django"	John Lewis	8:56
2.	"Bolero"		4:25
3.	"Manoir de Mes Reves"		5:57
4.	"Gitane"	Charlie Haden	3:15
5.	"Nuages"		9:00
6.	"Dinette"		6:07
7.	"Improvisation"	Christian Escoudé	2:55

== Personnel ==
- Charlie Haden – double bass
- Christian Escoudé – guitar
