= Get Those Elephants Out'a Here =

Studio album by The Mitchells with guest artist André Previn
- Released: 1959
- Recorded: October 6, 1958
- Studio: New York City
- Genre: Jazz
- Length: 35:54
- Label: MetroJazz; E 1012
- Producer: Leonard Feather

Whitey Mitchell chronology
Whitey Mitchell Sextette (1956)	Get Those Elephants Out'a Here (1959)	Just in Time (2004)

Red Mitchell chronology
Presenting Red Mitchell (1957)	Get Those Elephants Out'a Here (1958)	Rejoice! (1961)

Blue Mitchell chronology
Big 6 (1958)	Get Those Elephants Out'a Here (1958)	Out of the Blue (1959)

Get Those Elephants Out'a Here is an album by “The Mitchells”: bassist Whitey Mitchell, his brother, bassist and pianist Red and trumpeter Blue Mitchell (no relation). Featuring pianist André Previn, it was recorded for the MetroJazz label in 1958.

== Reception ==
Professional ratings
Review scores
Source	Rating
AllMusic	4.5/5 stars

The AllMusic review by Ken Dryden states: "Bassist Whitey Mitchell is the leader of this fascinating 1958 studio session, which features his better-known older brother, Red Mitchell, on piano and bass, trumpeter Blue Mitchell (no relation), pianist André Previn, baritone saxophonist Pepper Adams, trombonist Frank Rehak, and drummer Frank Capp. One of just two dates recorded as a leader by Whitey Mitchell prior to his early retirement from jazz, there are plenty of inspired moments on this date".

== Track listing ==
All compositions by Red Mitchell, except where indicated.

1. "Get Those Elephants Outa Here!" – 3:58
2. "My One and Only Love" (Guy Wood, Robert Mellin) – 5:23
3. "In the Wee Small Hours of the Morning" (David Mann, Bob Hilliard) – 4:22
4. "Moten Swing" (Bennie Moten, Buster Moten) – 4:20
5. "Monster Rally" (Whitey Mitchell) – 3:08
6. "Three Cheers" – 7:15
7. "Blues for Brian" (Whitey Mitchell) – 3:28
8. "Fraternity" – 4:00

== Personnel ==
- Whitey Mitchell – double bass
- Red Mitchell – bass (tracks 1, 2, 5 & 7), piano (tracks 3, 4, 6 & 8)
- Blue Mitchell – trumpet (tracks 1, 2 & 4–8)
- Frank Rehak – trombone (tracks 1, 2, 4, 5 & 7)
- Pepper Adams – baritone saxophone (tracks 1, 2 & 4–8)
- André Previn – piano (tracks 1, 2 & 7)
- Frankie Capp – drums (tracks 1–7)
