= That's What I Like =

That's What I Like may refer to:

- "That's What I Like" (Jive Bunny and the Mastermixers song), 1989
- "That's What I Like" (Bruno Mars song), 2017
- "That's What I Like", song by Jo Ann Tolley, 1954
- "That's What I Like", song written by Styne & Hillard, sung by Dean Martin on album Hey, Brother, Pour the Wine
- "That's What I Like", song written by Axton & Reeves, sung by Perry Como on album We Get Letters
- "That's What I Like", song by Flo Rida from The Peanuts Movie soundtrack
- "That's What I Like", song by Chas & Dave from the album Job Lot
