= All Night Session! Vol. 1 =

Studio album by Hampton Hawes Quartet
- Released: 1958
- Recorded: November 12, 1956
- Studio: Contemporary's Studio in Los Angeles, California
- Genre: Jazz
- Length: 39:00
- Label: Contemporary
- Producer: Lester Koenig

Hampton Hawes chronology
Everybody Likes Hampton Hawes (1956)	All Night Session! Vol. 1 (1958)	All Night Session! Vol. 2 (1956)

All Night Session! Vol. 1 is an album by pianist Hampton Hawes from a session recorded the night of November 12, 1956 at Contemporary's Studios in Los Angeles and released on Contemporary Records.

== Reception ==
Professional ratings
Review scores
Source	Rating
Allmusic	4.5/5 stars
The Rolling Stone Jazz Record Guide	4/5 stars
Tom Hull	B+
The Penguin Guide to Jazz Recordings	3.5/4 stars

In his review for AllMusic review states Arwulf Grenier wrote, "This studio session contained many elements associated with a live gig: the work took place during regular nightclub performing hours, the improvisations were mostly extended, and there were no alternate takes. A remarkable freshness and spontaneity prevailed throughout the session".

== Track listing ==
Side one
No.	Title	Writer(s)	Length
1.	"Jordu"	Duke Jordan	7:07
2.	"Groovin' High"	Dizzy Gillespie	5:48
3.	"Takin' Care"	Hampton Hawes	8:09

Side two
No.	Title	Writer(s)	Length
1.	"Broadway"	Henri Woode; Teddy McRae; Bill Bird	6:54
2.	"Hampton's Pulpit"	Hawes	11:14
Total length:			39:00

== Personnel ==
- Hampton Hawes – piano
- Jim Hall – guitar
- Red Mitchell – bass
- Eldridge Freeman – drums
