= Baritones and French Horns =

Modern Jazz Survey – Baritones And French Horns

Studio album by Pepper Adams/Cecil Payne/Julius Watkins/Dave Amram
- Released: August 1958
- Recorded: April 20 and May 18, 1957
- Studio: Van Gelder Studio, Hackensack, New Jersey
- Genre: Hard bop, cool jazz
- Length: 76:22
- Label: Prestige; PRLP 16-6
- Producer: Teddy Charles

Baritones and French Horns is a 16 2/3 rpm album released in August 1958 by Prestige Records. The album is one of a series of releases attributed to the Prestige All Stars. Each side of the album was a distinct date with distinct personnel. From a jazz.com review, Kenny Berger wrote, "Among the many innovative technological failures of the mid- and late- 1950s, the 16-rpm phonograph record stands as the industry's answer to the Edsel. One of Prestige's contributions to this auditory dustbin was an LP on steroids titled Baritones and French Horns under the supervision of vibist, composer, arranger, A&R man Teddy Charles. The baritone side of this album was reissued twice on LP and twice more on CD under John Coltrane's name [as Dakar], though Pepper Adams was the actual leader on these sessions." The "french horns" side of the album was reissued as Prestige ST 8305, Curtis Fuller and Hampton Hawes with French Horns.

== Track listing ==
Baritones

1. "Dakar" (Teddy Charles) — 7:09
2. "Mary's Blues" (Pepper Adams) — 6:47
3. "Route 4" (Charles) — 6:55
4. "Velvet Scene" (Waldron) — 4:53
5. "Witches Pit" (Adams) — 6:42
6. "Catwalk" (Charles) — 7:11

French Horns

1. "Ronnie's Tune" (Ball, Zito) — 7:27
2. "Roc And Troll" (Charles) — 7:11
3. "A-Drift" (Zito) — 6:13
4. "Lyriste" (Charles) — 6:00
5. "Five Spot" (Amram) — 3:28
6. "No Crooks" (Charles) — 6:26

== Personnel ==
Baritones (recorded April 20, 1957), also released as Dakar under John Coltrane's name

- John Coltrane – tenor saxophone
- Cecil Payne – baritone saxophone except track 4
- Pepper Adams – baritone saxophone
- Mal Waldron – piano
- Doug Watkins – bass
- Art Taylor – drums

French Horns (recorded May 18, 1957), also released as Curtis Fuller and Hampton Hawes with French Horns

- Julius Watkins – french horn
- David Amram – french horn
- Curtis Fuller – trombone
- Sahib Shihab – alto saxophone
- Addison Farmer – bass
- Jerry Segal – drums
- Hampton Hawes – piano except track 4
- Teddy Charles – piano on track 4
