= The Clown (album) =

Studio album by Charles Mingus
- Released: September 1957
- Recorded: February 13 and March 12, 1957
- Studio: Atlantic (New York City)
- Genre: Jazz
- Length: 40:41
- Label: Atlantic; SD-1260
- Producer: Nesuhi Ertegün

Charles Mingus chronology
Pithecanthropus Erectus (1956)	The Clown (1957)	Mingus Three (1957)

Professional ratings
Review scores
Source	Rating
AllMusic	5/5 stars
The Penguin Guide to Jazz Recordings	3/4 stars
The Rolling Stone Album Guide	4.5/5 stars

The Clown is a studio album by the jazz bassist and composer Charles Mingus. It was released in September 1957 through Atlantic Records. The recording took place on February 13 and March 12, 1957. The title track features the improvised narration of Jean Shepherd.

According to Nat Hentoff's liner notes, Mingus explained why he chose those four tracks for the album: "I selected these four over two others that were more intricate because some of those guys had been saying that I didn't swing. So I made some that did. This album also has the first blues I've made on record."

== Notes about the tracks ==
The following excerpts come from the original liner notes and are statements made by Mingus himself.

"Haitian Fight Song" - "I'd say this song has a contemporary folk feeling. My solo in it is a deeply concentrated one. I can't play it right unless I'm thinking about prejudice and hate and persecution, and how unfair it is. There's sadness and cries in it, but also determination. And it usually ends with my feeling: 'I told them! I hope somebody heard me.’ "

"Blue Cee" is a standard blues in two keys, C and B♭, "but that's not noticeable and it ends up in C, basically", he said and continued "I heard some Basie in it and also some church-like feeling".

"Reincarnation of a Lovebird" is a composition dedicated to bebop saxophonist Charlie Parker, known commonly as "Bird". "I wouldn't say I set out to write a piece on Bird. [...] Suddenly I realize it was Bird. [...] In one way, the work isn't like him. It's built on long lines and most of his pieces were short lines. But it's my feeling about Bird. I felt like crying when I wrote it."

"The Clown" tells the story of a clown "who tried to please people like most jazz musicians do, but whom nobody liked until he was dead. My version of the story ended with his blowing his brains out with the people laughing and finally being pleased because they thought it was part of the act. I liked the way Jean changed the ending; leaves it more up to the listener."

According to a later biography, Mingus was a fan of Shepherd's radio show on WOR and outlined a concept for Shepherd but encouraged him to elaborate and improvise.. Mingus said in an interview that he had the musicians overdub parts because of the novel complexity of the piece: "three-four keys at once, atonal, whatever you want to call it [...]. On 'The Clown' I couldn't have written that and had the guys do it right, so I had them overdub it."

A deluxe edition of The Clown was issued in 2000 on Rhino featuring two bonus tracks.

== Track listing ==
All tracks written by Charles Mingus.

1. "Haitian Fight Song" - 12:01
2. "Blue Cee" - 7:48
3. "Reincarnation of a Lovebird" - 8:31
4. "The Clown" - 12:29

=== Deluxe Edition bonus tracks ===
1. "Passions of a Woman Loved" - 9:52
2. "Tonight at Noon" - 5:57

== Personnel ==
- Charles Mingus - bass
- Shafi Hadi - alto and tenor saxophone
- Jimmy Knepper - trombone
- Wade Legge - piano
- Dannie Richmond - drums
- Jean Shepherd - narration (track 4)
