= Playin' in the Yard =

Live album by Hampton Hawes
- Released: 1973
- Recorded: July 7, 1973
- Venue: Montreux Jazz Festival, Montreux, Switzerland
- Genre: Jazz
- Length: 41:21
- Label: Prestige; PR 10077
- Producer: Orrin Keepnews

Hampton Hawes chronology
Live at the Jazz Showcase in Chicago (1973)	Playin' in the Yard (1973)	Northern Windows (1974)

Playin' in the Yard is a live album by jazz keyboardist Hampton Hawes recorded at the 1973 Montreux Jazz Festival for the Prestige label. Hampton's trio with Bob Cranshaw and Kenny Clarke also backed Dexter Gordon at the same concert, and the recordings with Gordon were released as Blues à la Suisse. Both recordings are noteworthy for Hampton's use of the electric piano for many of the performances.

== Track listing ==
All compositions by Hampton Hawes except as indication

1. "Playin' in the Yard" (Sonny Rollins) - 10:57
2. "Double Trouble" - 8:53
3. "Pink Peaches" - 5:03
4. "De De" - 8:53
5. "Stella by Starlight" (Victor Young, Ned Washington) - 7:35

== Personnel ==
- Hampton Hawes - piano, electric piano
- Bob Cranshaw - electric bass
- Kenny Clarke - drums
