= Four! =

Studio album by Hampton Hawes
- Released: 1958
- Recorded: January 27, 1958
- Genre: Jazz
- Length: 53:00
- Label: Contemporary
- Producer: Lester Koenig

Hampton Hawes chronology
All Night Session! Vol. 3 (1956)	Four! (1958)	For Real! (1958)

Professional ratings
Review scores
Source	Rating
AllMusic	5/5 stars
Penguin Guide to Jazz	3.5/4 stars
The Rolling Stone Jazz Record Guide	3/5 stars

Four! is a 1958 album by Hampton Hawes, originally released on the Contemporary label and reissued in 1991 by Original Jazz Classics.

== Reception ==
AllMusic's Scott Yanow gives the album five stars and states that "Pianist Hampton Hawes' 1950s recordings for the Contemporary label are at such a high level that they could all be given five stars. This outing with bassist Red Mitchell, drummer Shelly Manne, and guitarist Barney Kessel (who is a slight wild card) is also quite successful." The Penguin Guide to Jazz rates the album three and a half stars and states that "Hampton was always trying to broker a style which combined the strengths of old and new, and this was one of the places where the synthesis worked and showed the joins."

== Track listing ==
1. "Yardbird Suite" (Parker) - 6:40
2. "There Will Never Be Another You" (Gordon, Warren) - 6:59
3. "Bow Jest" (Mitchell) - 6:31
4. "Sweet Sue" (Young, Harris) - 5:35
5. "Up Blues" (Hawes) - 5:09
6. "Like Someone in Love" (Burke, Van Heusen) - 3:21
7. "Love Is Just Around the Corner" (Gensler, Robin) - 5:42
8. "Thou Swell" (Hart, Rodgers) - 4:54 (CD reissue bonus track)
9. "The Awful Truth" (Hawes) - 8:09 (CD reissue bonus track)

== Personnel ==
- Hampton Hawes - piano
- Barney Kessel - guitar
- Red Mitchell - double bass
- Shelly Manne - drums

== See also ==
- Hampton Hawes discography
