= I'm All Smiles (Hampton Hawes album) =

Live album by Hampton Hawes
- Released: 1973
- Recorded: April 30 & May 1, 1966
- Venue: Mitchell's Studio Club, Los Angeles, CA
- Genre: Jazz
- Length: 38:11
- Label: Contemporary S7631
- Producer: Lester Koenig

Hampton Hawes chronology
The Seance (1966)	I'm All Smiles (1973)	Hamp's Piano (1967)

I'm All Smiles is a live album by American jazz pianist Hampton Hawes recorded in 1966 but not released on the Contemporary label until 1973.

== Reception ==
The Allmusic review by Ron Wynn states "His phrasing and voicings could entice or amaze, and he displays great range, rhythmic vitality, and harmonic excellence during the five selections featured on this 1966 live date".

Professional ratings
Review scores
Source	Rating
Allmusic	3/5 stars
The Rolling Stone Jazz Record Guide	3/5 stars
The Penguin Guide to Jazz Recordings	3/4 stars

== Track listing ==
1. "I'm All Smiles" (Michael Leonard, Herbert Martin) - 7:25
2. "Manhã de Carnaval" (Luiz Bonfá, Antônio Maria) - 5:25
3. "Spring Is Here" (Richard Rodgers, Lorenz Hart) - 5:04
4. "The Shadow of Your Smile" (Johnny Mandel, Paul Francis Webster) - 9:55
5. "Searchin'" (Hampton Hawes) - 10:22

== Personnel ==
- Hampton Hawes - piano
- Red Mitchell - bass
- Donald Bailey - drums
