= Jan August =

American musician (1904–1976)

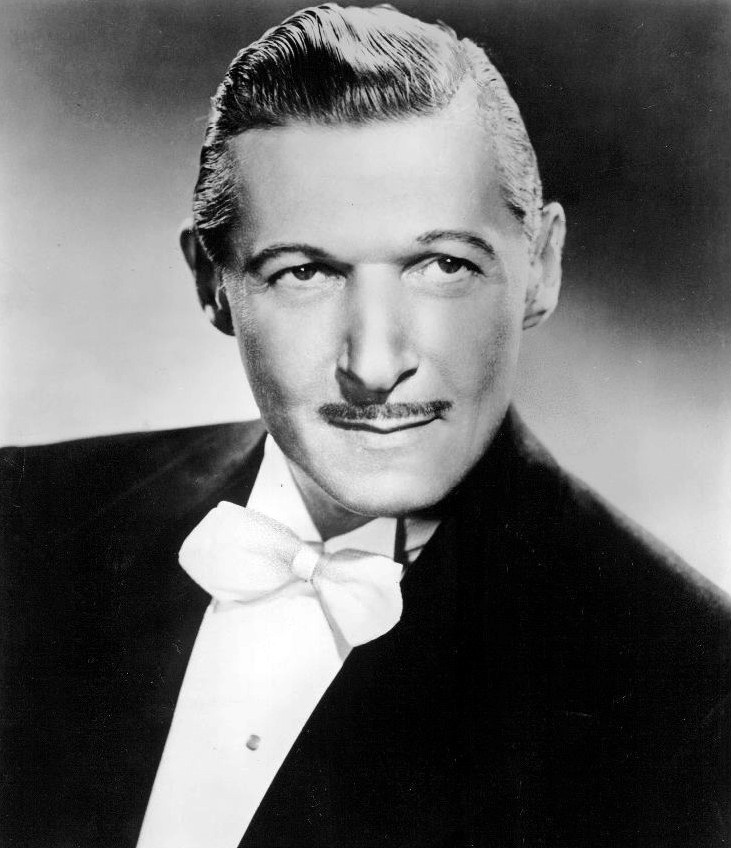
August in 1959.

Jan August (born Jan Augustoff; September 24, 1904 – January 9, 1976) was an American pianist and xylophonist. He had a hit with his version of "Misirlou" in 1947 with Carl Frederick Tandberg.

August was born in New York City. He was self-taught and began his career at age 17 in Greenwich Village, had hits with several other songs that blended classical styles and Latin beats. He was discovered in 1946 in a New York City nightclub by an executive for Diamond Records. The executive was so eager to have August with his label, he wrote the recording contract on one of the club's tablecloths. Early in his career August recorded on the Diamond label ("Misirlou" is on his album Piano Magic for Diamond). He played his hit for the Press Photographers' Ball in Washington, D.C., in 1947, and in turn, Harry Truman responded by playing the "Missouri Waltz" for August.

In the early 1950s, he was recording on Mercury; one notable Mercury side is a swinging and thoughtful arrangement of "Hot Lips". Later LP albums demonstrated a shift away from August's distinctive earlier style, toward the semi-satirical "honky-tonk" style of the late 1950s personified by such artists as Joe "Fingers" Carr.

In 1974, a musician calling himself Jan August played an extended engagement at La Ronda restaurant in St. Petersburg, Florida. When a newspaper reporter for the St. Petersburg Times went to see him perform, she realized he did not look like Jan August and had a different musical style. She became suspicious and traced August through the musicians' union in New York City. August declined pressing charges, but indicated that his name could no longer be used by the other musician.

August died in New York City of heart disease at age 71.
