= Dakar (album) =

Studio album by Pepper Adams and Cecil Payne with John Coltrane
- Released: November 1963
- Recorded: April 20, 1957; Van Gelder Studio, Hackensack, New Jersey
- Genre: Hard bop
- Length: 39:37
- Labels: Prestige; PRLP 7280
- Producer: Teddy Charles

Pepper Adams and Cecil Payne with John Coltrane chronology
John Coltrane and Johnny Hartman (1963)	Dakar (1963)	Live at Birdland (1964)

Dakar is an album by the jazz saxophonist and composer John Coltrane. It was released in November 1963 through Prestige Records.

Dakar is a reissue of one side of the 16 2/3 rpm LP Baritones and French Horns (released in 1958), a portion of which was recorded on April 20, 1957 (the same day Dakar was recorded), and which was a session led by Pepper Adams and Cecil Payne on which Coltrane was a sideman.

Dakar was one of several 1960s Prestige reissues featuring Coltrane to take advantage of his growing stardom in the 1960s.

== Reception ==
Professional ratings
Review scores
Source	Rating
All About Jazz	3.5/5 stars
AllMusic	4/5 stars
The Rolling Stone Jazz Record Guide	4/5 stars
The Penguin Guide to Jazz Recordings	2.5/4 stars
The Virgin Encyclopedia of Jazz	3/5 stars

In a review for AllMusic, Lindsay Planer wrote: "Although at the time these were considered 'leaderless' units, upon hearing the interaction of the participants, modern ears might desire to qualify that statement" given the nature of Coltrane's contribution.

Chris May of All About Jazz commented: "It's rough and ready music, almost certainly rehearsed for the first time in the studio... but it sure is ready... A minor chapter in the Coltrane canon it may be, but Dakar is a characterful set of propulsive, pre-codification hard bop and still a delight over half a century later."

== Track listing ==
No.	Title	Writer(s)	Length
1.	"Dakar"	Teddy Charles	7:09
2.	"Mary's Blues"	Pepper Adams	6:47
3.	"Route 4"	Charles	6:55
4.	"Velvet Scene"	Mal Waldron	4:53
5.	"Witches Pit"	Adams	6:42
6.	"Catwalk"	Charles	7:11
Total length:			39:37

== Personnel ==
- John Coltrane - tenor saxophone
- Cecil Payne - baritone saxophone
- Pepper Adams - baritone saxophone
- Mal Waldron - piano
- Doug Watkins - bass
- Art Taylor - drums
