= Block chord =

Musical chord with rhythmic unison

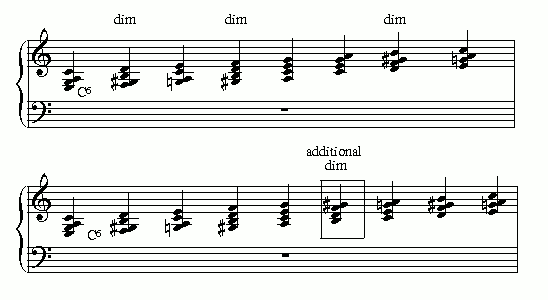
Block chord

A block chord is a chord or voicing built directly below the melody either on the strong beats or to create a four-part harmonized melody line in "locked-hands" rhythmic unison with the melody, as opposed to broken chords. This latter style, known as shearing voicing, was popularized by George Shearing, but originated with Phil Moore, among others.

Block chord style (also known as chorale style) uses simple chordal harmony in which "the notes of each chord may be played all at once" as opposed to being "played one at a time (broken or arpeggiated chords). For example, a guitarist can strum the chord (this would be a "block" chord) or use a picking style to play "broken" chords".

== Sources ==
- Schmidt-Jones, Catherine. "Simple Chordal Harmony". openstax.cnx (accessed 7 November 2016).
- Sudhalter, Richard M. (2001). Lost Chords: White Musicians and Their Contribution to Jazz, 1915–1945. Oxford University Press. ISBN 978-0-19-514838-1.
