= Locked hands style =

Piano Technique

Locked hands style is a technique of chord voicing for the piano. Popularized by the jazz pianist George Shearing, it is a way to implement the "block chord" method of harmony on a keyboard instrument.

The technique requires the pianist to play the melody in unison with both hands. The right hand plays a four-note chord inversion in which the melody note is the highest note in the voicing. The remaining three notes are voiced as closely as possible below the melody note, forming a block chord. The left hand doubles the melody one octave lower.

To achieve this effect, the pianist’s hands are placed close together on the keyboard and move simultaneously in the same direction. To an observer, the hands appear to be locked together.

The technique had been employed by numerous jazz pianists prior to Shearing, such as Phil Moore, Duke Ellington, Count Basie and Red Garland. Shearing said he was first exposed to it through Milt Buckner, the pianist for Lionel Hampton and the musician considered the originator of the technique. This harmonic technique was also used in the horn arrangements of Glenn Miller's big band and is a staple of modern big band arranging.
