= Christian Escoudé =

French Gypsy jazz guitarist (1947–2024)

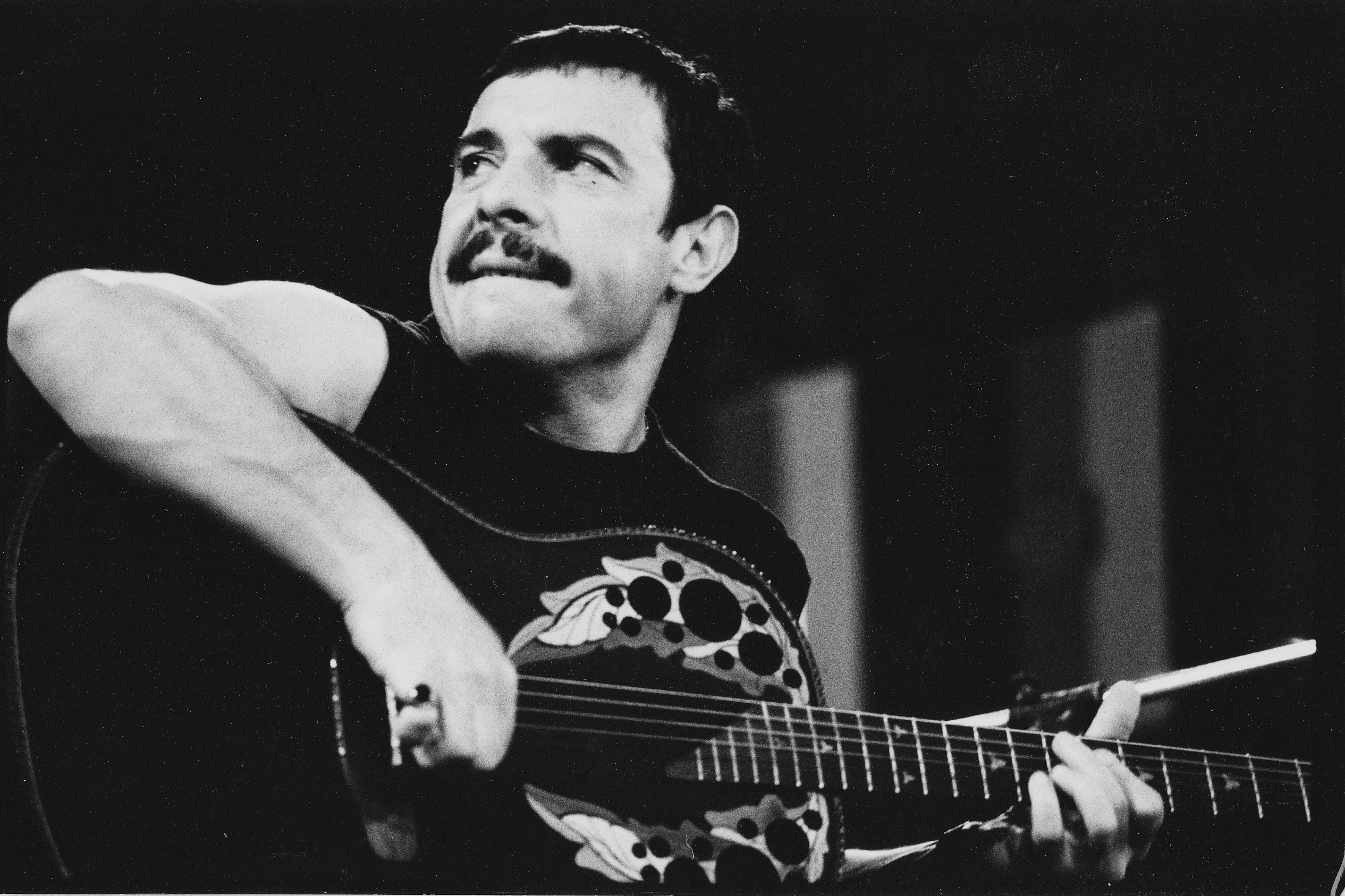
- Escoudé in 1984

Background information
- Born: 23 September 1947; Angoulême, Charente, France
- Died: 13 May 2024 (aged 76)
- Genres: Gypsy jazz, jazz fusion, world music
- Occupation: Musician
- Instrument: Guitar
- Years active: 1969–2024
- Labels: Dreyfus, JMS, Nocturne, EmArcy, Sunnyside
- Formerly of: Babik Reinhardt, David Reinhardt

Christian Escoudé (23 September 1947 – 13 May 2024) was a French Gypsy jazz guitarist.

Escoudé grew up in Angoulême and was of Romani descent on his father's side. His father was also a guitarist who was influenced by Django Reinhardt. When Escoudé was ten, his father began teaching him the guitar, and he became a professional musician at age fifteen. His style was a mix of bebop and gypsy jazz influences, featuring the use of vibrato, portamento, and fast runs.

In 1972, he started work in a trio with Aldo Romano. By the 1980s, he was in John Lewis's quartet. He also played with Philip Catherine for a time. In his forties, he signed with the French division of Verve Records.

== Career ==
=== 1970s–1980s ===
From 1969 to 1971, he was a member of the Aimé Barelli band. In Paris, he joined the trio of Eddy Louiss Bernard Lubat, and Aldo Romano. Later, he joined Didier Levallet's Swing String System and the Michel Portal Unit.

In 1976, l'Académie du Jazz awarded him the Prix Django Reinhardt. He then formed a new quartet with Michel Graillier, Aldo Romano, and Alby Cullaz, the latter soon replaced by Jean-François Jenny-Clark. He also worked with Michel Portal or Slide Hampton, Martial Solal and Jean-Claude Fohrenbach.

In 1978, he performed at the Festival de Nice with John Lewis, Bill Evans, Stan Getz, Freddie Hubbard, Philly Joe Jones, Lee Konitz, and Shelly Manne. The same year, he began a tradition of participating in the annual Festival de Samois, a tribute to Reinhardt. He performed in the Festival de Dakar in 1979 with the trio of René Urtreger, Pierre Michelot, and Daniel Humair.

Escoudé toured in a duo with guitarist John McLaughlin during 1980. The following year he joined the big band of Martial Solal and in 1982 performed in a quartet with Shelly Manne. In 1983, he played in duo again, this time with Didier Lockwood. Soon after, they added Philip Catherine. Escoudé formed the Trio Gitan with Boulou Ferré and Babik Reinhardt, Django's son.

Then he played in quartet in 1988 with Jean-Michel Pilc, François Moutin and Louis Moutin. In 1989, he created an octet, half of them guitarists: Paul Challain Ferret, Jimmy Gourley, Frédéric Sylvestre, and himself. The rest of the octet consisted of Marcel Azzola on accordion, Vincent Courtois on cello, Alby Cullaz on bass, and Billy Hart on drums.

=== 1990 onwards ===
In 1990, Escoudé played at the Village Vanguard in New York City with Pierre Michelot, Hank Jones, and Kenny Washington. The following year he recorded an album of compositions by Django Reinhardt while supported by a string orchestra. In 1998 he recorded A Suite for Gypsies, a jazz fusion album. On the fiftieth anniversary of Reinhardt's death in 2003, he formed a big band of seventeen musicians.

In 2004 Escoudé organized the New Gypsy Trio with David Reinhardt (another relative of Django) and Martin Taylor (or Jean-Baptiste Laya). The next year, he released the album Ma Ya. He formed his Progressive Sextet with Marcel Azzola, Jean-Baptiste Laya, Stéphane Guillaume, Jean-Marc Jafet, and Yoann Serra.

In 2012, he released the album Christian Escoudé joue Brassens: Au bois de mon cœur, a tribute to French poet and musician Georges Brassens. Escoudé played the compositions of Brassens with bassist Pierre Boussaguet and drummer Anne Paceo, with guests violinist Fiona Monbet, clarinetist Andre Villeger, Gypsy jazz guitarist Biréli Lagrène and 11-year-old Gypsy guitarist Swan Berger.

== Death ==
Escoudé died on 13 May 2024, at the age of 76.

== Discography ==
=== As leader/co-leader ===
- Reunion (Musica, 1976)
- Les 4 Éléments with Jean-Charles Capon (Musica, 1976)
- Christian Escoude & Alby Cullaz (Red, 1979)
- Return (Red, 1979)
- Gitane with Charlie Haden (All Life, 1979) – recorded in 1978
- Gousti with Jean-Charles Capon (All Life, 1980)
- Gipsy's Morning (JMS, 1981)
- Trio (JMS, 1983)
- Christian Escoude Group Featuring Toots Thielemans (JMS, 1983)
- Three of a Kind (JMS, 1985)
- Gipsy Waltz (Mercury, 1989)
- Plays Django Reinhardt (EmArcy/Gitanes, 1991)
- Holidays (EmArcy/Gitanes, 1993)
- In L.A. (Verve/Gitanes, 1993)
- Cookin' in Hell's Kitchen (Verve/Gitanes, 1995)
- At Duc Des Lombards (Verve, 1997)
- A Suite for Gypsies (EmArcy/Gitanes, 1998)
- Charentes (Elabeth, 2001)
- Paris Ma Muse (Fremeaux, 2001)
- Ma Ya. Ya (Nocturne, 2005)
- 20 Ans De Trio Gitan: Live in Marciac (Nocturne, 2007)
- Le Nouveau Trio Gitan (Nocture, 2007)
- Catalogne (Plus Loin, 2010)
- Au Bois de Mon Coeur (Universal/EmArcy, 2011)
- Saint-Germain-Des-Pres/The Music of John Lewis (Universal, 2013)

=== As sideman ===
- Andre Ceccarelli, Ceccarelli (Carla, 1977)
- Louis Chedid, Ces Mots Sont Pour Toi (Philips, 1992)
- Jean Corti, Couka Mon (Slip, 2001)
- Michel Graillier, Libra (Musica, 1978)
- Jean-Marc Jafet, Mes Anges (Cristal, 2004)
- John Lewis, Mirjana (Ahead, 1978)
- John Lewis, Midnight in Paris (Emarcy, 1988)
- Guy Marchand, NostalGitan (Virgin, BRJ/EMI, 1998)
- Florin Niculescu, Plays Stephane Grappelli (Blujazz, 2008)
- Michel Portal, L'ombre Rouge (Saravah, 1981)
- Steve Potts, Musique Pour Le Film D'Un Ami (Un-Deux-Trois,1975)
- Martial Solal, Martial Solal Big Band (Gaumont, 1981)
- Rene Urtreger, Niels-Henning Orsted Pedersen, Masters (Carlyne, 1987)
- Mike Zwerin, Not Much Noise (Spotlite, 1979)
