= The Seance (album) =

Live album by Hampton Hawes Trio
- Released: 1969
- Recorded: April 30 & May 1, 1966
- Studio: Mitchell's Studio Club, Los Angeles, CA
- Genre: Jazz
- Length: 44:14
- Label: Contemporary S7621
- Producer: Lester Koenig

Hampton Hawes chronology
Jam Session (1968)	The Seance (1969)	Hamp's Piano (1969)

The Seance is a live album by American jazz pianist Hampton Hawes recorded in 1966 but not released on the Contemporary label until 1969.

== Reception ==
The Allmusic review by Scott Yanow states "Hawes displays the influence of the avant-garde in places, stretching out his improvisations a bit while still showing off his roots in bop".

Professional ratings
Review scores
Source	Rating
Allmusic	4.5/5 stars
The Rolling Stone Jazz Record Guide	3/5 stars
Tom Hull	B+
The Penguin Guide to Jazz Recordings	3/4 stars

== Track listing ==
1. "The Seance" (Hampton Hawes) - 7:57
2. "Oleo" (Sonny Rollins) - 8:40
3. "Easy Street" (Alan Rankin Jones) - 5:42
4. "Suddenly I Thought of You" (Hampton Hawes) - 6:56
5. "For Heaven's Sake" (Elise Bretton, Donald Meyer, Sherman Edwards) - 5:13
6. "My Romance" (Richard Rodgers, Lorenz Hart) - 9:46

== Personnel ==
- Hampton Hawes - piano
- Red Mitchell - bass
- Donald Bailey - drums
- Reice Hamel - Recording Engineer
