= Jo Ann Tolley =

American singer

- Born: 1928 or 1929; Hartford, Connecticut, U.S.
- Education: Hartford Public High School
- Occupations: Singer
- Labels: MGM Records; Jubilee Records

Jo Ann Tolley (born 1928 or 1929). is a vocalist who recorded on the MGM Records and Jubilee Records labels in the 1950s. Among her notable songs are I'd Never Forgive Myself (1953), I Tried Again/That's What I Like (1954) and Don't/Baby Want You Please Come Home (1955). Although her music was once erroneously reviewed as rhythm & blues, it is considered pop music.

== Early life and career ==
Born and raised in Hartford, Connecticut (residing for at least the latter portion of those years at Ward Place), during which time she excelled in at least one sport, reportedly becoming "roller skate champ". She briefly attended Hartford Public High School before launching her performing career in the mid-1940s.

Her live appearances, or at least those made billed as Jo Ann–or Joanne–Tolley, began getting media coverage in January 1950, when she was one of "eight vaudeville acts" on the bill with onscreen horror icon Rondo Hatton, starring in Universal's The Brute Man. In 1953 she opened at the Casa Blanca in Canton, Ohio on December 11, for three days. Afterward she performed for two weeks at the Spa Athletic Club in Erie, Pennsylvania, beginning on December 14.

In July 1955, Tolley was heard on the WRC series, The National Radio Fan Club. In December of that year, she was an added attraction on a bill with Bill Haley and the Comets at the Courthouse Square Theatre in Springfield, Massachusetts. Reviewing her January 1957 performance, headlining at Montreal's El Morocco, Gazette critic Harold Whitehead gives Tolley a brief but comprehensive thumbs-up.

[A] dark, statuesque, handsome girl, [Tolley] has a good style and a voice of power and considerable beauty. Unlike most of her colleagues in the recording world, her voice sounds as if it had had quite a bit of training. She has carefully chosen repertory of numbers calculated to show off the deep richness of her tone and she succeeds in giving each song proper consideration. Her arrangements are good and, altogether, she is quite an impressive performer.

== Personal life ==
According to Frank Sinatra biographer Kitty Kelley. Tolley had a romance with Sinatra.
