= The Chaperones =

American doo-wop group

The Chaperones are one of the first American street corner harmony doo-wop groups, formed in Farmingdale, Long Island, New York, in the late 1950s. The original members of the group were Tony Amato (lead), Roy Marchesano (first tenor), Tommy Ronca (second tenor), Nick Salvato (baritone) and Dave Kelly (bass).

Initially known as the Sharptones and the Fairlanes, until the Josie record label named the group "The Chaperones" for its relevance to the dances and proms of the day. The Chaperones were signed by Josie Records a spin-off label of Jubilee Records in 1959 after Nick Salvato played the group's first demo for his C.W. Post College classmate Steve Blaine, son of Josie head Jerry Blaine. The group's initial Josie recording, "Cruise to the Moon", was produced by Steve Blaine and Mickey Eichner. By the time "Cruise to the Moon" was released in 1960, Rich Messina had replaced Dave Kelly as bass. In the meantime, The Chaperones backed up Lee Adrian on "Barbara, Let's Go Steady" and "So Lonely" (Richcraft Records). In the early 1960s the Chaperones were featured on Clay Cole's weekly music variety showcase.

After the success of "Cruise to the Moon", the group performed regularly in the New York area at supermarket openings and theme parks. They appeared at Murray the K's shows at Frontierland in Patchogue and Freedomland in the Bronx, at Bruce Morrow shows co-billing The Earls and The Five Discs, and at Palisades Park with The Five Satins.

The Chaperones' 1961 follow-up record "Shining Star" was an attempt to play on the success of "Little Star" by The Elegants and "Hushabye" by The Mystics. They backed Lou Jordan on "Paradise for Two" and "Close Your Eyes" in 1961 on Josie. They then released their last record on Josie: a remake of the Chandeliers' "Blueberry Sweet" backed with "Man From the Moon".

After "The Chaperones last Josie recording, Tommy Ronca and Roy Marchesano left for Las Vegas, where they performed and produced shows for many years. Nick and Tony and the group then cut a record on the Tabor label, "I Dream" and a newer rendition of "Pizza Pie". Tony Amato and Nick Salvato kept the group going for many years until Amato's death in the late 1980s.

Original members, Nick Salvato and Tommy Ronca, reformed the group along with Johnny Contino and Ronca's cousin Vinny "Zeen" Esposito from the original Sharptones group, to perform at the Cool Bobby B Doo Wop Convention at the Alexis Park Hotel in Las Vegas, Nevada, in 2010.

== Discography ==
- 1960: Side A - "Cruise to the Moon" Side B - "Dance with Me" (Josie Records)
- 1961: Side A - "Shining Star" Side B - "My Shadow and Me" (Josie Records)
- 1963: Side A - "Man from the Moon" Side B - "Blueberry Sweet" (Josie Records)

== Bibliography ==
- Warner, Jay. (2006). American Singing Groups: A History, From 1940 to Today . Hal Leonard. ISBN 978-0-634-09978-6
- Continuum Encyclopedia of Popular Music of the World Part I / Volume II ISBN 978-0826463227
