= Misirlou =

Eastern Mediterranean folk song

"Miserlou" (instrumental)
Performed by the Strolling Strings of the United States Air Force Band

"Misirlou" (Note: From Greek: Μισιρλού < Turkish: Mısırlı, lit. 'Egyptian' < Arabic: مصر, romanized: Miṣr, lit. 'Egypt') is a folk song from the Eastern Mediterranean region. The song's original author is unknown, but Arabic, Greek, and Jewish musicians were playing it by the 1920s. The earliest known recording of the song is a 1927 Greek rebetiko/tsifteteli composition. There are also Arabic belly dancing, Albanian, Armenian, Serbian, Persian, Indian and Turkish versions of the song. This song was popular from the 1920s onwards in the Arab American, Armenian American and Greek American communities who settled in the United States.

The song was a hit in 1946 for Jan August, an American pianist and xylophonist nicknamed "the one-man piano duet". It gained worldwide popularity through Dick Dale's 1962 American surf rock version, originally titled "Miserlou", which popularized the song in Western popular culture; Dale's version was influenced by an earlier Arabic folk version played with an oud. Various versions have since been recorded, mostly based on Dale's version, including other surf and rock versions by bands such as the Beach Boys, the Ventures, and the Trashmen, as well as international orchestral easy listening (exotica) versions by musicians such as Martin Denny and Arthur Lyman. Dale's surf rock version was heard in the 1994 film Pulp Fiction.

== History ==
=== Name ===
Misirlou (Μισιρλού), due to the suffix -ού, is the feminine form (in Greek) of Misirlis (Μισιρλής, a surname) which comes from the Turkish word Mısırlı, which is formed by combining Mısır ('Egypt' in Turkish, borrowed from Arabic مِصر, Miṣr) with the Turkish -lı suffix, literally meaning 'Egyptian'. Therefore, the song is about an Egyptian woman. The original Turkish word Mısırlı is, however, genderless.

=== Composition ===
The folk song has origins in the Eastern Mediterranean region of the Ottoman Empire, but the original author of the song is not known. There is evidence that the folk song was known to Arabic musicians, Greek rebetiko musicians and Jewish klezmer musicians by the 1920s. The claim in some sources that the tune derives from the song "Bint Misr" ("Egyptian Girl") written by Egyptian musician Sayed Darwish is thought to be incorrect.

The earliest known recording of the song was by the rebetiko musician Theodotos ("Tetos") Demetriades (Greek: Θεόδοτος ("Τέτος") Δημητριάδης) in 1927. Demetriades, an Ottoman Greek, was born in Istanbul, Ottoman Empire, in 1897, and he resided there until he moved to the United States in 1921, during a period when most of the Greek speaking population fled the emerging Turkish state. It is likely that he was familiar with the song as a folk song before he moved to the United States. As with almost all early rebetika songs (a style that originated with the Greek refugees from Asia Minor in Turkey), the song's actual composer has never been identified, and its ownership rested with the band leader. Demetriades named the song "Misirlou" in his original 1927 Columbia recording, which is a Greek assimilated borrowing of the regional pronunciation of "Egyptian" in Turkish ("Mısırlı"), as opposed to the corresponding word for "Egyptian" (female) in Greek, which is Αιγύπτια (Aigyptia).

The rebetiko version of the song was intended for a Greek tsifteteli dance, at a slower tempo and a different key than the Oriental performances that most are familiar with today. This was the style of recording by Michalis Patrinos in Greece, circa 1930, which was circulated in the United States by the Orthophonic label; another recording was made by Patrinos in New York City in 1931 as well.

The song's Oriental melody has been popular for a long period of time that many people, from Morocco to Iraq, claim it to be a folk song from their own country. In the realm of Middle Eastern music, the song is easier to learn, since it is little more than going up and down the Hijaz Kar or double harmonic scale (E–F–G♯–A–B–C–D♯). It still remains a well known Greek, Klezmer and Arab folk song.

=== Later versions ===
"Miserlou"

Single by Dick Dale
- B-side: "Eight Till Midnight"
- Released: April 21, 1962
- Genre: Surf; instrumental rock
- Length: 2:15
- Label: Deltone Records
- Songwriters: Nicholas Roubanis; Fred Wise; Chaim Tauber; Milton Leeds
- Producer: Jim Monsour

Dick Dale singles chronology
"Jungle Fever" (1962)	"Miserlou" (1962)	"Peppermint Man" (1962)

Nick Roubanis, a Greek-American music instructor, released a jazz instrumental arrangement of the song, crediting himself as the composer, in 1941. Since his claim was never legally challenged, he is still officially credited as the composer today worldwide, except in Greece where credit is given to either Roubanis or Patrinos. Subsequently, Chaim Tauber, Fred Wise and Milton Leeds wrote English lyrics to the song. Roubanis is also credited with fine-tuning the key and the melody, giving it the Oriental sound that it is associated with today. The song soon became an "exotica" standard among the light swing (lounge) bands of the day.

Harry James recorded and released "'Misirlou" in 1941 on Columbia 36390, and the song peaked at No. 22 on the U.S. chart.

Pianist Jan August recorded a version of the song on Diamond Records (Diamond 2009) in 1946. It reached No. 7 on the Billboard Jockey charts in the U.S.

Turkish-Jewish polyglot singer Darío Moreno recorded a version with lyrics sung in French in 1951.

Dick Dale – "Misirlou" (1962)
Dick Dale's "Misirlou" (1962), a surf rock cover version. It was responsible for popularizing the song in Western popular culture.

Dick Dale rearranged the song as a solo instrumental rock guitar piece in 1962. During a performance, Dale was bet by a young fan that he could not play a song on only one string of his guitar. Dale's father James Monsour and uncles were Lebanese-American musicians, and Dale remembered seeing his uncle play "Misirlou" on one string of the oud. He vastly increased the song's tempo to make it into rock and roll. It was Dale's surf version that introduced "Misirlou" to a wider audience in the U.S. Dale recorded a new version with faster tempo for his 1975 Greatest Hits compilation.

Jazz pianist Vince Guaraldi recorded a live version with his quartet at the Trident Jazz Club in Sausalito, California in December 1962. It was released the following year on Vince Guaraldi in Person.

The Beach Boys recorded a Dale-inspired "Misirlou" for the 1963 album Surfin' U.S.A.

Serbian folk singer Staniša Stošić recorded his version of the song, called "Lela Vranjanka" ("Lela from Vranje"), in 1972.

=== Dance ===
In 1945, a Pittsburgh women's musical organization asked Professor Brunhilde E. Dorsch to organize an international dance group at Duquesne University to honor America's World War II allies. She contacted Mercine Nesotas, who taught several Greek dances, including Syrtos Haniotikos (from Crete), which she called Kritikos, but for which they had no music. Because Pittsburgh's Greek-American community did not know Cretan music, Pat Mandros Kazalas, a music student, suggested the tune "Misirlou", although slower, might fit the dance.

The dance was first performed at a program to honor America's allies of World War II at Stephen Foster Memorial Hall in Pittsburgh on March 6, 1945. Thereafter, this new dance, which had been created by putting the Syrtos Kritikos to the slower "Misirlou" music, was known as Misirlou and spread among the Greek-American community, as well as among non-Greek U.S. folk-dance enthusiasts.

It has been a staple for decades of dances held at Serbian Orthodox churches across the U.S., performed as a kolo, a circle dance. The dance is also performed to instrumental versions of "Never on Sunday" by Manos Hadjidakis – though in the Serbian-American community, "Never on Sunday" was popularly enjoyed as a couple's dance and actually sung in English. "Never on Sunday" was often one of only two songs performed in English at these dances, the other song being "Spanish Eyes" (formerly "Moon Over Naples") also internationally popular in its time.

The Misirlou dance also found its way into the Armenian-American community who, like the Greeks, were fond of circle dances, and occasionally adopted Greek dances. The first Armenian version of "Misirlou" was recorded by Reuben Sarkisian in Fresno the early 1950s. Sarkisian wrote the Armenian lyrics to "Misirlou" which are still sung today, however he wrote the song as "Akh, Anoushes" ("Ah, My Sweet") while later Armenian singers would change it to "Ah Anoush Yar" ("Ah, Sweet Lover"; Yar meaning sweetheart or lover, from Turkish).

=== Legacy ===
Dick Dale's version of "Misirlou" was used on the soundtrack of the 1994 motion picture Pulp Fiction, prominently featured over the opening titles.

The song was selected by the Athens 2004 Olympics Organizing Committee as one of the most influential Greek songs of all time, and was heard in venues and at the closing ceremony, where it was performed by Anna Vissi.

Q magazine placed Dale's version at number 89 in its list of the 100 Greatest Guitar Tracks in March 2005.

The Black Eyed Peas heavily incorporates Dale's version of "Misirlou" in their 2006 single "Pump It" from their album Monkey Business.
