= All Night Session! Vol. 3 =

Studio album by Hampton Hawes Quartet
- Released: 1958
- Recorded: November 13, 1956
- Studio: Contemporary's Studio (Los Angeles, California)
- Genre: Jazz
- Length: 35:47
- Label: Contemporary
- Producer: Lester Koenig

Hampton Hawes chronology
All Night Session! Vol. 2 (1956)	All Night Session! Vol. 3 (1958)	Four! (1958)

All Night Session! Vol. 3 is an album by pianist Hampton Hawes from a session recorded the morning of November 13, 1956 at Contemporary's Studios in Los Angeles and released on the Contemporary label.

== Reception ==
Professional ratings
Review scores
Source	Rating
Allmusic	4.5/5 stars
The Rolling Stone Jazz Record Guide	3/5 stars
The Penguin Guide to Jazz Recordings	3.5/4 stars

The Allmusic review states "Vol. 3 of the Hampton Hawes Quartet's All Night Session contains three spontaneously improvised variations on the blues, one very cool extended rendition of Duke Ellington's 'Do Nothin' 'Till You Hear from Me' and a strikingly handsome treatment of Harold Arlen's 'Between the Devil and the Deep Blue Sea.'"

== Track listing ==
Side one
No.	Title	Writer(s)	Length
1.	"Do Nothing till You Hear from Me"	Duke Ellington; Bob Russell	11:03
2.	"Blues #3"	Hampton Hawes	7:38

Side two
No.	Title	Writer(s)	Length
1.	"Between the Devil and the Deep Blue Sea"	Harold Arlen; Ted Koehler	11:00
2.	"Blues #4"	Hawes	6:17
Total length:			35:47

1991 reissue bonus track
No.	Title	Writer(s)	Length
5.	"Blues of a Sort"	Hawes	5:37

== Personnel ==
- Hampton Hawes – piano
- Jim Hall – guitar
- Red Mitchell – bass
- Eldridge Freeman – drums
