= Spider Webb (jazz drummer) =

American drummer (1944–2026)

- Born: Kenneth Ronald Rice; June 15, 1944; Detroit, Michigan, U.S.
- Died: May or June 2026 (aged 81)
- Genres: Jazz
- Occupation: Session musician
- Instrument: Drums
- Website: Archived 2019-09-11 at the Wayback Machine

Spider Webb (born Kenneth Ronald Rice; June 15, 1944 – May or June 2026) was an American jazz drummer and session musician.

== Life and career ==
Rice began playing drums at an early age in his home town of Detroit. Before leaving the motor city, he recorded with United Artists and Holland-Dozier-Holland. He moved to New York in 1967 where he quickly gained prominence as a studio drummer. Webb was hired on the spot by King Curtis and became the drummer for Harry Belafonte, from 1969 through 1972. In 1972, he played in a band backing David Clayton-Thomas, with Smitty Smith, Chuck Rainey, and Danny Kortchmar.

He also recorded with Freddie Hubbard, Robert Palmer, The Temptations, Aretha Franklin, Grover Washington, Jr, Labelle, Herb Alpert and Hugh Masekela, among others.

Webb was once married to Carol Kaye, with whom he founded the soul-jazz group Spiders Webb. He died from lung cancer in May or June 2026, at the age of 81.

== Selected discography ==
=== As sideman ===
- 1972: Moon Shadow – Labelle (Warner Bros., BS 2618)
- 1974: Northern Windows – Hampton Hawes (Prestige)
- 1975: Feels So Good – Grover Washington, Jr. (Kudu Records)
- 1976: Some People Can Do What They Like – Robert Palmer (Island Records, ILPS 9420)
- 1978: Herb Alpert / Hugh Masekela (Horizon, 1978)

=== As leader ===
- 1976: I Don’t Know What’s On Your Mind - Spiders Webb (Fantasy - F 9517)

== Bibliography ==
- Rice, Kenneth (2009). Spider Webb Untangled - The Life and Times of Legendary Drummer Kenneth Rice. Bank House Books. ISBN 978-1904408307.
