= The Sermon (Hampton Hawes album) =

Studio album by Hampton Hawes
- Released: 1987
- Recorded: November 24–25, 1958
- Studio: Contemporary Records Studio, Los Angeles
- Genre: Jazz
- Length: 40:49
- Label: Contemporary; C 7653
- Producer: Lester Koenig

Hampton Hawes chronology
Recorded Live at the Great American Music Hall (1983)	The Sermon (1987)	Live at the Jazz Showcase in Chicago Volume Two (1989)

The Sermon is an album of spirituals by American jazz pianist Hampton Hawes recorded in 1958, but not released on the Contemporary label until 1987.

== Reception ==
The Allmusic review by Scott Yanow called said the album was "full of intense emotion, strong melodies and a little more variety than one might expect" and stated "This set was pianist Hampton Hawes' last before he started what would be five years in prison on drug charges. He had been arrested 11 days before and ironically chose to record a set of spirituals (plus a blues) as he awaited trial".

Professional ratings
Review scores
Source	Rating
Allmusic	4/5 stars
The Penguin Guide to Jazz Recordings	3.5/4 stars

== Track listing ==
All compositions are traditional except as indicated

1. "Down by the Riverside" – 4:43
2. "Just a Closer Walk with Thee" – 5:00
3. "Swing Low, Sweet Chariot" – 4:52
4. "Nobody Knows the Trouble I've Seen" – 4:52
5. "When The Roll Is Called Up Yonder" – 4:31
6. "Go Down Moses" – 4:33
7. "Joshua Fit de Battle of Jericho" – 3:54
8. "Blues N/C" (Hampton Hawes) - 8:49

== Personnel ==
- Hampton Hawes – piano
- Leroy Vinnegar – bass
- Stan Levey – drums
