= Chuck Thompson (drummer) =

Charles Edmund Thompson, known as Chuck Thompson, (June 4, 1926 – March 7, 1982) was an American jazz drummer active in California and New York City during the 1940s and 1950s. While he made many recordings, jazz critic Leonard Feather stated, "Chuck Thompson, who sounded good enough on records, is even more memorable live especially with Miles Davis . He is an unusually spare, functional drummer who does not lean on his top cymbal all night, whose accessories are just that, and who possesses an unfailing sense of time."

== Life and career ==
Charles Edmund Thompson was born in New York City on June 4, 1926. He initially trained as a pianist in his native city, but after relocating to Hollywood, California he studied percussion for five years. In 1943 he became a drummer in Charlie Echols's band, and in 1946 he returned to New York City to join Joe Albany and Miles Davis as a member of Charlie Parker’s bop quintet. In 1947 he performed and recorded as a member of Dexter Gordon and Wardell Gray's quintet; performing on the Original Jazz Classics records Dexter Gordon 1943-1947 and Dexter Gordon on Dial: The Complete Sessions. He later made records again with Gray in 1950 and Gordon in 1952 (Dexter Blows Hot and Cold, Boplicity Records) and 1955. That same year he performed with Benny Carter and Howard McGhee, and recorded with trumpeter Gerald Wilson.

In 1949 Thompson made recordings with Art Pepper and Hampton Hawes as a member of the Kenton All Stars. He also performed in concerts with Erroll Garner and Sonny Criss in 1949; appearing on the record Erroll Garner 1949, Vol. 2 (Original Jazz Classics). He reunited with Hawes in the recording studio in 1955 when they worked together as sidemen for records made separately by Barney Kessel (Volume 2: Kessel Plays Standards, Original Jazz Classics) and Red Mitchell (Jam For Your Band, Bethlehem Records). He also played in trio with Mitchell and Hawes in 1955–1956; recording the record Everyone Loves Hampton Hawes (Original Jazz Classics). With them he made the record The Trio (1955, Original Jazz Classics).

Thompson recorded with Sonny Criss in Los Angeles in 1949 and 1957; contributing to the record Sonny Criss Quartet, 1949-1957 (Fresh Sound). In 1956 he played on the record The Complete Imperial Sessions (Blue Note Records) with pianists Sonny Clark and Kenny Drew. He spent the remainder of the decade working as a freelance musician in San Francisco.

Thompson died in Los Angeles on March 7, 1982.

== Collaborations ==
With The Tymes

- Diggin' Their Roots (RCA Victor, 1977)
