= Jerry Blaine =

American bandleader, singer and record company executive (1910–1973)

- Born: December 31, 1910; Allenwood, New Jersey
- Died: March 14, 1973 (age 63); Nassau, New York
- Occupation(s): Record producer Singer
- Known for: Founding partner of Jubilee Records

Jerry Blaine (December 31, 1910 – March 14, 1973) was a bandleader, co-founder of Jubilee Records, record distributor, and singer who recorded 18 sides for the Master and Bluebird labels from 1937 to 1938.

== Biography ==
He was born to a Jewish family in Allenwood, New Jersey on December 31, 1910. In May 1946, Herb Abramson founded Jubilee Records with Jerry Blaine as his business partner. In September 1947, Abramson had Blaine buy him out and Blaine became the sole proprietor of Jubilee. Jubilee's first hit record was in 1948 with the Orioles' song "It's Too Soon To Know" (# 1 R&B, # 14 pop). The song was originally issued on Blaine's It's a Natural label. The label also released risque comedy records and Kermit Schafer's blooper recordings.

Blaine's largest money maker was his record distribution company, Cosnat Distributing.

During Alan Freed's payola trial of February 4, 1960, Blaine was implicated in paying to have his music played on the radio.

Jubilee was sold to Viewlex in 1970 and Blaine left the company. He agreed to serve as a consultant to Viewlex for a year.

The master tapes were eventually sold to Roulette Records. Morris Levy sold Roulette to Rhino Records in the late 1980s.

Jerry Blaine died from a heart attack in 1973 in Nassau, New York.

== Jerry Blaine Orchestra in 1937 ==
- Carl Frederick Tandberg, bass
- George Schmidt, trumpet
- Buddy Pottle, trumpet
- Fred Train, trumpet
- Nat Lobovsky, trombone
- Tony Antonelli, saxophone
- Abe Markowitz, saxophone
- Harry Roberts, saxophone
- Irving Broucke, saxophone
- Jack Matthias, piano
- Joel Livingston, guitar
- Eddie Ross, drums
- Phyllis Kenny, vocals
- Johnny McKeever, vocals
- Jerry Blaine, vocals
