= Jubilee Records =

Defunct American record label

- Parent company: Warner Music Group
- Founded: 1946
- Founder: Herb Abramson
- Defunct: 1971
- Genre: Rhythm and blues, novelty
- Country of origin: U.S.
- Location: New York City

Jubilee Records was an American independent record label, specializing in rhythm and blues and novelty records. It was founded in New York City in 1946 by Herb Abramson. His partner was Jerry Blaine. Blaine bought Abramson's half of the company in 1947, when Abramson went on to co-found Atlantic Records with Ahmet Ertegun. The company name was Jay-Gee Recording Company, a subsidiary of the Cosnat Corporation. Cosnat was a wholesale record distributor.

== History ==
Jubilee was the first independent record label to reach the white market with a black vocal group, when the Orioles' recording of "Crying in the Chapel" reached the Top Twenty on the Pop chart in 1953.

The Four Tunes started recording for Jubilee in 1953. The biggest early hit for Jubilee was "Crying in the Chapel" by the Orioles. A subsidiary label, Josie Records, was formed in 1954 and issued more uptempo material. Hits on Josie included "Speedoo" by the Cadillacs (number 3 R&B, number 17 pop) and "Do You Want to Dance" by Bobby Freeman (number 2 R&B, number 5 pop). The biggest success was the million-seller "Last Kiss", by J. Frank Wilson and the Cavaliers, which reached number 2 on the Billboard Hot 100 in 1964. In the late 1960s, The Meters, a group of New Orleans session musicians, released a series of R&B instrumental hits, including "Cissy Strut", which reached number 4 R&B and number 23 pop. The label's last rock-and-roll hit was the rhythm-and-blues instrumental "Poor Boy"/"Wail!" by the Royaltones (number 17, 1957).

Of the label's novelty recordings, releases by the blooper compiler Kermit Schaefer, and the comedian Rusty Warren were successful.

Jubilee/Josie also had a custom label, Gross Records, whose only artist was Doug Clark and the Hot Nuts; their material was so off-color that the Jubilee and Josie names appeared nowhere on their albums.

In 1970, Jubilee/Josie, in financial difficulties, was sold to Viewlex, which owned Buddah Records, and Blaine left the company. The catalog was eventually taken over by Roulette Records. The label was declared bankrupt in 1971.

In the late 1980s, Roulette was sold jointly to Rhino Records and EMI, and in the 1990s, Rhino was sold to Time Warner. The rights to the Jubilee Records archives in North America are now owned by Warner Music, with EMI holding the rights in the rest of the world until 2013.

Warner Music Group now has worldwide rights to the Roulette/Jubilee catalogue as a result of acquiring Parlophone in 2013.

== Roster ==
This is a list of recording artists who have had at least one recording released on the Jubilee Records label.

- The Association
- Sil Austin
- Jim Backus
- Harry Belafonte
- Polly Bergen
- The Blades of Grass
- The Bobbettes
- Jimmy Boyd
- Piney Brown
- Tedd Browne
- Vinnie Burke
- The Cadillacs
- The Channels
- Bobby Comstock and the Counts
- Don Cornell
- Eddie Costa
- Bob Crewe
- The Cues
- Alan Dale
- Vivian Dandridge
- The Delta Rhythm Boys
- The Dominoes
- Dorothy Donegan
- Ray Draper
- Dave Dudley
- The Fifth Estate
- The Five Sharps
- The Four Coins
- The Four Tunes
- Bobby Freeman
- The Gallahads
- Erroll Garner
- Herb Geller
- The Happenings
- Betty Harris
- Emmylou Harris
- Jack Haskell
- Dick Haymes
- Autry Inman
- Conrad Janis and the Tailgaters
- The Jesters
- Aliza Kashi
- The King Sisters
- Baker Knight
- Moe Koffman
- The Larks
- Little Sylvia (Sylvia Robinson)
- Bill Mack
- The Marylanders
- Lou McGarity
- Rod McKuen
- Memphis Slim
- Charles Mingus
- Domenico Modugno
- Lou Monte
- Vaughn Monroe
- Oliver
- Sy Oliver
- The Orioles
- Frankie Ortega
- Billy Paul
- The Raindrops
- Carl Ravazza
- The Ray-O-Vacs
- The Rebels
- Della Reese
- Sylvia Robbins (Sylvia Robinson)
- Sylvia Robinson
- Don Rondo
- The Royal Teens
- Kermit Schaefer
- Walter Scharf
- Allan Sherman
- Bobby Sherwood
- The Sidewalk Surfers
- The Skyliners
- Lu Ann Simms
- Smith & Dale
- Lou Stein
- Larry Storch
- Enzo Stuarti
- Gene Summers and His Rebels
- Donna Theodore
- Jo Ann Tolley
- The Top Notes
- The Valentinos
- The Volumes
- Billy Ward and the Dominoes
- Rusty Warren
- Dee Dee Warwick
- Ethel Waters
- Mary Wells
- Randy Weston
- Ilene Woods
- Ethel Ennis

== Josie Records artists ==
This is a list of recording artists who have had at least one recording released on the Josie Records label.

- The Cadillacs
- The Chaperones
- Carol Fran
- Bobby Freeman
- The Meters
- J. Frank Wilson and the Cavaliers

== See also ==
- List of record labels
