= Red Mitchell =

American jazz musician and poet (1927–1992)

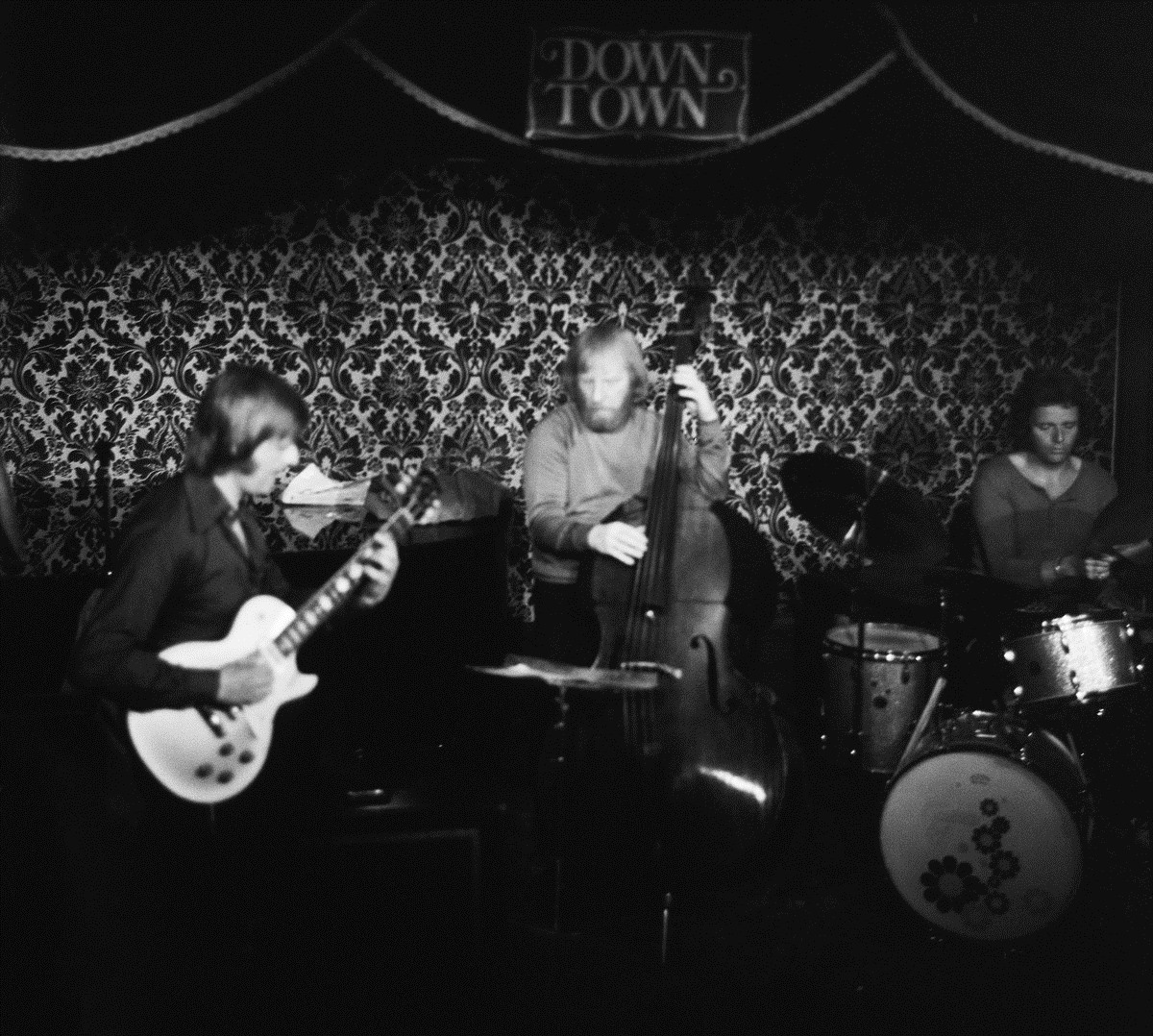
- Rune Gustafsson, Red Mitchell, and Egil "Bop" Johansen, Down Town jazz club, Oslo, 1972

Background information
- Born: Keith Moore Mitchell; September 20, 1927; New York City, U.S.
- Died: November 8, 1992 (aged 65) Salem, Oregon, U.S.
- Genres: Jazz
- Occupations: Musician, composer
- Instrument: Bass
- Labels: Bethlehem; Contemporary; Atlantic; Mercury; Sonet; SteepleChase; Artists House; All Life; Enja
- Website: www.redmitchell.com

Keith Moore "Red" Mitchell (September 20, 1927 – November 8, 1992) was an American jazz double-bassist, composer, lyricist, and poet.

== Biography ==
Mitchell was born in New York City. His younger brother, Whitey Mitchell, also became a jazz bassist.

Mitchell was raised in New Jersey by a father who was an engineer and loved music, and a mother who loved poetry. His first instruments were piano, alto saxophone, and clarinet. Although Cornell University awarded him an engineering scholarship, by 1947 he was in the U.S. Army playing bass. The next year, he was in a jazz trio in New York City.

Mitchell performed and/or recorded with Mundell Lowe, Chubby Jackson, Charlie Ventura, Woody Herman, Red Norvo, Gerry Mulligan, and, after joining the West Coast jazz scene in the early 1950s, with André Previn, Shelly Manne, Hampton Hawes, Billie Holiday, Stan Seltzer, Ornette Coleman, and others such as Mahalia Jackson. He also worked as a bassist in television and film studios around Los Angeles, occasionally appearing on screen. Mitchell also appeared in documentaries about Tal Farlow and Zoot Sims.

Saxophonist Harold Land and Mitchell founded and co-led a quintet in the early 1960s.

Mitchell moved to Stockholm in 1968. He won Sweden's Grammis Award in 1986 and again in 1991, for his recorded performances as a pianist, bassist, and vocalist, and for his compositions and poetic song lyrics.

During this period, Mitchell performed and/or recorded with Clark Terry, Lee Konitz, Herb Ellis, Jim Hall, Joe Pass, Kenny Barron, Hank Jones, Ben Webster, Bill Mays, Warne Marsh, Jimmy Rowles, Phil Woods, Roger Kellaway, Putte Wickman and others. He frequently collaborated in duos, most notably with pianist Kellaway after the mid-1980s.

The Swedish government awarded Mitchell the Illis quorum in 1992.

Returning to the United States in early 1992, Mitchell settled in Oregon, where he died of a stroke at age 65 on November 8, 1992.

A collection of his poetry was published posthumously. His widow is preparing a biography.

== Technique and playing style ==
Mitchell used standard tuning during the 1950s and for the first half of the 1960s, and produced sound similar to his professional jazz bass peers. However, "in 1966 he switched to cello tuning on his bass (C-G-D-A, an octave below the cello, instead of the standard E-A-D-G). At the same time, he began adjusting the tone controls of his amplifier to create a soft, unfocused sound in the lowest notes and to emphasize the upper harmonics in higher notes. The result was an airy tone quality that sounded gentle, not muscular. This airy tone and his frequent habit of strumming the strings with his right thumb contributed greatly to his unusual style."

== Discography ==
=== As leader/co-leader ===
- Happy Minors (Bethlehem, 1955) 10" LP with Bob Brookmeyer and Zoot Sims
- Red Mitchell (Bethlehem, 1956)
- Presenting Red Mitchell (Contemporary, 1957)
- Get Those Elephants Out'a Here (MetroJazz, 1958) with Whitey Mitchell, Blue Mitchell and André Previn
- Rejoice! (Disques Vogue, 1961)
- Hear Ye! (Atlantic, 1962) by the Red Mitchell-Harold Land Quintet
- One Long String (Mercury, 1969)
- Bästisar! (Artist, 1973) with Evabritt Strandberg
- Live at Cervantes (Gazell/Sonet, 1973) with Robert Malmberg
- Two Way Conversation (Sonet, 1974) with Barney Kessel
- I Concentrate on You: A Tribute to Cole Porter (SteepleChase, 1974) with Lee Konitz
- Chocolate Cadillac with Horace Parlan, Nisse Sandstrom, Rune Carlsson, Idrees Sulieman, 1976
- But Three's a Crowd (Bluebell, 1977) with Karin Krog
- Blues for a Crushed Soul (Sonet, 1978)
- Jim Hall/Red Mitchell (Artists House, 1978) with Jim Hall
- Valse Hot: Sweet Basil 1978 (ArtistShare released 2016) with Jim Hall
- Scairport Blues (Yupiteru, 1978)
- Red'n Me (All Life, 1979) with Jimmy Rowles
- What I Am (Caprice, 1979)
- Bass Club (Paddle Wheel, 1980) with Isao Suzuki and Tsuyoshi Yamamoto
- You're Me (Phontastic, 1980) with Tommy Flanagan
- Empathy (Gryphon, 1980) with Joe Beck
- Three for All (Enja, 1981) with Phil Woods and Tommy Flanagan
- When I'm Singing (1982, Enja)
- Simple Isn't Easy, 1983
- Home Suite, 1985
- To Duke and Basie (Enja, 1986) with Clark Terry
- Duo with Hank Jones (Timeless, 1987)
- Fifty/Fifty (Stash Records, 1987) with Roger Kellaway
- Jive at Five (Enja, 1988) with Clark Terry
- The Red Barron Duo (Storyville, 1988) with Kenny Barron
- Alone Together (Dragon, 1988) with Roger Kellaway
- Mitchell's Talking with Ben Riley, Kenny Barron, 1989
- Blaus with Jan Johannsson, 1992
- Life's a Take (Concord Jazz, 1993 [Concord Duo Series, Vol. 1; recorded 1992]) with Roger Kellaway
- Evolution with Lars Jansson, Joakim Milder, 1995
- Live in Stockholm with Roger Kellaway, Joakim Milder, 1995
- Red Mitchell-Warne Marsh Big Two, Vol. 2 with Warne Marsh, 1998
- Live at Port Townsend with George Cables, 2005

=== As sideman ===
With Mose Allison

- I've Been Doin' Some Thinkin' (Atlantic, 1968)

With Gene Ammons

- Gene Ammons in Sweden (Enja, 1981)

With Frankie Avalon

- ...And Now About Mr. Avalon (Chancellor, 1961)

With Chet Baker

- Chet Baker Sings and Plays (Pacific Jazz, 1955)

With Louis Bellson

- Music, Romance and Especially Love (Verve, 1957)

With Paul Bley

- Live at Sweet Basil (Soul Note, 1988)

With Pat Boone

- Pat Boone Sings Guess Who? (London, 1963)

With Bob Brookmeyer

- Bob Brookmeyer Quartet (Pacific Jazz, 1954)

With Red Callender

- The Lowest (MetroJazz, 1958)

With Ornette Coleman

- Tomorrow Is the Question! (Contemporary Records, 1959)

With Buddy Collette

- Jazz Loves Paris (Specialty, 1958)
- At the Cinema! (Mercury, 1959)

With Tony Crombie

- Rockin' with the Rockets – 1958 (Columbia (UK:33S1108) (10") - (Red Morris, Jimmy Currie, Ashley Kozak, Clyde Ray (vocals)

With Bobby Darin

- Love Swings (Atco, 1961)

With Maynard Ferguson

- Dimensions (EmArcy, 1955)

With Tommy Flanagan

- Super-Session (Enja, 1980) with Elvin Jones

With The Four Freshmen

- Voices In Latin (Capitol, 1958)
- The Four Freshmen and Five Guitars (Capitol, 1959)
- First Affair (Capitol, 1960)

With Jimmy Giuffre

- 7 Pieces (Verve, 1959)
- Ad Lib (Verve, 1959)

With Jim Hall

- Jazz Guitar (Pacific Jazz, 1957)
- Good Friday Blues (Pacific Jazz, 1960) as The Modest Jazz Trio

With Herbie Harper

- Five Brothers (Tampa, 1955)

With Hampton Hawes

- Hampton Hawes Trio (Contemporary, 1955)
- This Is Hampton Hawes (Contemporary, 1956)
- Everybody Likes Hampton Hawes (Contemporary, 1956)
- All Night Session! Vol. 1 (Contemporary, 1958)
- All Night Session! Vol. 2 (Contemporary, 1958)
- All Night Session! Vol. 3 (Contemporary, 1958)
- Four! (Contemporary, 1958)
- The Seance (Contemporary, 1969)
- I'm All Smiles (Contemporary, 1973)

With Paul Horn

- House of Horn (Dot, 1957)
- Plenty of Horn (Dot, 1958)

With Billie Holiday

- Live in Europe 1954 (Blue Note, 1990)

With Stan Kenton

- Kenton with Voices (Capitol, 1957)
- Lush Interlude (Capitol, 1958)
- Sophisticated Approach (Capitol, 1961)

With Barney Kessel

- Kessel Plays Standards (Contemporary, 1955)
- To Swing or Not to Swing (Contemporary, 1955)
- Easy Like (Contemporary, 1956)

With Karin Krog

- I Remember You... (Spotlite, 1981) with Warne Marsh

With Johnny Mandel

- I Want to Live (United Artists, 1958)

With Shelly Manne

- Bells Are Ringing (Contemporary, 1958)

With Warne Marsh

- Music for Prancing (Mode, 1957)

With Gil Mellé

- Gil Mellé Quintet/Sextet (Blue Note, 1953)

With Jack Montrose

- Arranged/Played/Composed by Jack Montrose (Atlantic, 1955)

With Gerry Mulligan

- Paris Concert (Pacific Jazz, 1955)
- California Concerts (Pacific Jazz, 1955)
- I Want to Live (United Artists, 1958)

With Bill Perkins and Richie Kamuca

- Tenors Head-On (Liberty, 1957)

With André Previn

- Pal Joey (Contemporary, 1957)
- Gigi (Contemporary, 1958)
- King Size! (Contemporary, 1959)
- West Side Story (Contemporary, 1959)
- The Subterraneans (Soundtrack) (MGM, 1960)
- André Previn and J. J. Johnson (Columbia, 1961) with J.J. Johnson
- Sessions, Live (Calliope, 1978) recorded 1956–57
- A Different Kind of Blues (Angel, 1980) with Itzhak Perlman
- It's a Breeze (Angel, 1981) with Itzhak Perlman

With Della Reese

- I Gotta Be Me...This Trip Out (ABC, 1968)

With Shorty Rogers

- Shorty Rogers Plays Richard Rodgers (RCA Victor, 1957)
- The Fourth Dimension in Sound (Warner Bros., 1961)
- An Invisible Orchard (RCA Victor, 1997)

With Dick Rosmini

- Adventures for 12-String, 6-String and Banjo (Elektra, 1964)

With Pete Rugolo

- The Music from Richard Diamond (EmArcy, 1959)
- 10 Trombones Like 2 Pianos (Mercury, 1960)
- The Original Music of Thriller (Time, 1961)
- 10 Saxophones and 2 Basses (Mercury, 1961)

With George Russell

- Electronic Sonata for Souls Loved by Nature (Flying Dutchman, 1969)

With Joe Sample

- Fancy Dance (Sonet, 1969)

With Bud Shank

- Bud Shank - Shorty Rogers - Bill Perkins (Pacific Jazz, 1955)

With Zoot Sims

- In a Sentimental Mood (Sonet, 1985)

With Frank Sinatra

- Come Dance with Me! (Capitol, 1959)
- Sinatra's Swingin' Session!!! (Capitol, 1961)
- The World We Knew (Reprise, 1967)

With Pierre Strom

- Rallarvisor (YTF Records, 1973)

With Clark Terry

- Out of Nowhere (Bingow, 1978)
- Brahms Lullabye (Bingow, 1978)
- Funk Dumplin's (Matrix, 1978)

With Cal Tjader

- West Side Story (Fantasy, 1960)
- The Prophet (Verve, 1968)

With Mel Tormé

- Mel Tormé and the Marty Paich Dek-Tette (Betlehem, 1956)

With Ben Webster

- Ben Webster at the Renaissance (Contemporary, 1960)

With Magni Wentzel

- New York Nights (Gemini, 1992)
