= Stan Seltzer =

Stanley Seltzer
- Seltzer circa 1960

Background information
- Born: Stanley Wilson Seltzer; November 8, 1927; Aurora, Illinois, U.S.
- Died: August 1, 2000 (aged 72) Pima, Arizona
- Genres: Jazz
- Occupation: Musician
- Instrument: Piano
- Years active: 1950s–1970s

Stanley Wilson Seltzer (November 8, 1927 – August 1, 2000) was an American jazz pianist.

Seltzer was the pianist in the house band at Ricky's Lounge in Alhambra with Paul Peters and Carl Frederick Tandberg.
