= List of Grammy Hall of Fame Award recipients (J–P) =

The Grammy Hall of Fame is a hall of fame to honor musical recordings of lasting qualitative or historical significance. Inductees are selected annually by a special member committee of eminent and knowledgeable professionals from all branches of the recording arts. It is compiled by The Recording Academy in the United States, and was established in 1973. Recordings (singles and albums) in all genres are eligible for selection, and must be at least 25 years old to be considered. Additions to the list are chosen annually by a committee of recording arts professionals.

This list covers the letter(s) J–P.

== List ==
Title	Artist	Record label	Year of release	Genre	Format	Year inducted
Jackson Browne	Jackson Browne	Asylum	1972	Rock	Album	2019
Jaco Pastorius	Jaco Pastorius	Epic	1976	Jazz Fusion	Album	2019
"Jailhouse Rock"	Elvis Presley	RCA	1957	Rock & Roll	Single	2017
"Jambalaya (On the Bayou)"	Hank Williams	MGM	1952	Country	Single	2002
"James Bond Theme"	John Barry & his Orchestra	United Artists	1962	Soundtrack	Single	2008
Jazz at Massey Hall	"The Quintet", including: Charlie Parker, Dizzy Gillespie, Bud Powell, Max Roach, Charles Mingus	Debut	1953	Jazz	Album	1995
Jazz Samba	Stan Getz and Charlie Byrd	Verve	1962	Jazz	Album	2010
J. D. Crowe & The New South	J. D. Crowe and The New South	Rounder	1975	Bluegrass	Album	2025
Jelly Roll Morton: The Saga of Mr. Jelly Lord (Library of Congress Recordings)	Ferdinand "Jelly Roll" Morton	Circle Sound	1949-50	Jazz	Album	1980
"Jesus Gave Me Water"	The Soul Stirrers	Specialty Records	1951	Gospel	Single	2026
"Jitterbug Waltz"	Fats Waller & his Rhythm Band	Bluebird	1942	Jazz	Single	2015
Joan Baez	Joan Baez	Vanguard	1960	Folk	Album	2011
John Coltrane and Johnny Hartman	John Coltrane and Johnny Hartman	Impulse	1963	Jazz	Album	2013
John Prine	John Prine	Atlantic	1971	Folk	Album	2015
"Johnny B. Goode"	Chuck Berry	Chess	1958	Rock & Roll	Single	1999
Johnny Cash at Folsom Prison	Johnny Cash	Columbia	1968	Country	Album	2018
Johnny Cash at San Quentin	Johnny Cash	Columbia	1969	Country	Album	2004
"Jolene"	Dolly Parton	RCA Nashville	1973	Country pop	Single	2014
The Joshua Tree	U2	Island	1987	Rock	Album	2014
Journey In Satchidananda	Alice Coltrane	Impulse!	1971	Spiritual jazz	Album	2026
Judy at Carnegie Hall	Judy Garland	Capitol	1961	Vocal jazz	Album	1998
"Juke"	Little Walter & his Night Cats	Checker	1952	Chicago Blues	Single	2008
"Just Because"	Frankie Yankovic	Columbia	1948	Polka	Single	1999
"Just the Way You Are"	Billy Joel	Columbia	1977	Soft rock	Single	2004
"Just You, Just Me"	Lester Young & his Quartet	Keynote	1943	Jazz	Single	1999
"Kansas City"	Wilbert Harrison	Fury	1959	R&B	Single	2001
"Kansas City Stomps"	Jelly Roll Morton	Victor	1928	Jazz	Single	2010
"Kassie Jones"	Furry Lewis	Victor	1928	Blues	Single	2012
"Keep My Skillet Good and Greasy"	Uncle Dave Macon	Vocalion	1924	Country	Single	2007
"Keep on the Sunny Side"	The Carter Family	Victor	1928	Southern Gospel	Single	2006
"Key to the Highway"	Big Bill Broonzy	Okeh	1941	Blues	Single	2012
Khachaturian: Piano Concerto in D-Flat Major	William Kapell with Boston Symphony Orchestra conducted by Serge Koussevitzky	RCA	1943	Classical	Album	1999
"Killing Me Softly with His Song"	Roberta Flack	Atlantic	1973	Soul	Single	1999
Kind of Blue	Miles Davis	Columbia	1959	Jazz	Album	1992
The King and I Original Broadway Cast Recording	Cast: Yul Brynner, Gertrude Lawrence, Dorothy Sarnoff, Doretta Morrow, Larry Douglas, Sandy Kennedy, etc.	Decca	1951	Musical show	Album	2000
"King of the Road"	Roger Miller	Smash	1965	Country	Single	1999
"King Porter Stomp"	Benny Goodman and his Orchestra	Victor	1935	Jazz	Single	2008
"Kiss an Angel Good Mornin'"	Charley Pride	RCA Victor	1971	Country	Single	2024
Kiss Me, Kate Original Broadway Cast Recording	Cast: Lisa Kirk, Harold Lang, Alfred Drake, Patricia Morison, etc.	Columbia	1948	Musical show	Album	1998
"Knock on Wood"	Eddie Floyd	Stax	1966	Southern soul	Single	2025
"Ko-Ko"	Charlie Parker's Ri Bop Boys	Savoy	1945	Jazz	Single	2019
"Ko-Ko"	Duke Ellington and his Famous Orchestra	Victor	1940	Jazz	Single	2011
The Köln Concert	Keith Jarrett	ECM	1975	Jazz	Album	2011
Korngold: Violin Concerto	Jascha Heifetz with Los Angeles Philharmonic conducted by Alfred Wallenstein	RCA Victor	1949	Classical	Album	2008
Kristofferson	Kris Kristofferson	Monument	1970	Country	Album	2014
"La Bamba"	El Jarocho	Victor	1939	Folk	Single	2019
"La Bamba"	Ritchie Valens	Del-Fi	1958	Rock & roll	Single	2000
"La Vie en Rose"	Édith Piaf	Columbia	1947	Traditional pop	Single	1998
Lady in Satin	Billie Holiday	Columbia	1958	Jazz	Album	2000
"Lady Marmalade"	Labelle	Epic	1974	Disco	Single	2003
Lady Sings the Blues	Billie Holiday	Clef	1956	Jazz	Album	2017
"Last Date"	Floyd Cramer	RCA	1960	Country	Single	2004
"Last Kind Words Blues"	Geeshie Wiley	Paramount	1930	Jazz	Single	2025
"Layla"	Derek and the Dominos	Atco	1971	Rock	Single	1998
Layla and Other Assorted Love Songs	Derek and the Dominos	Atco	1970	Blues rock	Album	2000
"Lazy River"	Louis Armstrong	Okeh	1931	Jazz	Single	2010
"Le Freak"	Chic	Atlantic	1978	Disco	Single	2015
"Lean on Me"	Bill Withers	Sussex	1972	Soul	Single	2007
Led Zeppelin	Led Zeppelin	Atlantic	1969	Rock	Album	2004
Led Zeppelin IV	Led Zeppelin	Atlantic	1971	Rock	Album	1999
Leoncavallo: "Pagliacci Act I: Vesti la Giubba"	Enrico Caruso	Victrola	1907	Classical	Single	1975
"Lester Leaps In"	Count Basie's Kansas City 7 Featuring Lester Young	Vocalion	1939	Jazz	Single	2005
"Let It Be"	The Beatles	Apple	1970	Gospel	Single	2004
Let It Bleed	The Rolling Stones	London	1969	Blues	Album	2005
"Let the Good Times Roll"	Louis Jordan & his Tympany Five	Decca	1946	Jump blues	Single	2009
Let's Get It On	Marvin Gaye	Tamla	1973	Soul	Album	2004
"Let's Have a Party"	Wanda Jackson	Capitol	1960	Rock & Roll	Single	2024
"Let's Stay Together"	Al Green	Hi	1971	R&B	Single	1999
"The Letter"	The Box Tops	Mala	1967	Rock	Single	2011
Licensed to Ill	Beastie Boys	Def Jam	1986	Hip-hop	Album	2021
"Light My Fire"	The Doors	Elektra	1967	Rock	Track	1998
"Like a Rolling Stone"	Bob Dylan	Columbia	1965	Rock	Single	1998
Liszt: Sonata in B minor	Vladimir Horowitz	RCA Victor	1932	Classical	Album	2008
"The Little Old Log Cabin in the Lane"	Fiddlin' John Carson	Okeh	1923	Country	Single	1998
Live at the Apollo	James Brown and The Famous Flames	King	1963	Soul	Album	1998
Live at the Regal	B. B. King	ABC	1965	Blues	Album	2006
"The Loco-Motion"	Little Eva	Dimension	1962	Pop	Single	2016
London Calling	The Clash	CBS	1979	Punk rock	Double album	2007
"The Lonely Bull"	Herb Alpert and The Tijuana Brass	A&M	1962	Pop	Single	1998
"Lonely Teardrops"	Jackie Wilson	Brunswick	1958	R&B	Single	1999
"Long Tall Sally"	Little Richard	Specialty	1956	Rock & roll	Single	1999
"The Look of Love"	Dusty Springfield	Colgems	1967	Pop	Single	2008
"Losing My Religion"	R.E.M.	Warner Bros.	1991	Alternative rock	Single	2017
Lost in the Stars Original Broadway Cast Album	Cast: Todd Duncan, Frank Roane, Inez Matthews, Sheila Guyse, Herbert Coleman, etc.	Decca	1949	Musical show	Album	2013
"Louie Louie"	The Kingsmen	Jerden	1963	Garage rock	Single	1999
Louis Armstrong Plays W.C. Handy	Louis Armstrong and his All-Stars	Columbia	1954	Jazz	Album	2010
"Love Is Strange"	Mickey and Sylvia	Groove	1956	R&B	Single	2004
"Love Me or Leave Me"	Ruth Etting	Columbia	1928	Pop	Single	2005
A Love Supreme	John Coltrane	Impulse	1965	Jazz	Album	1999
"Love Theme from The Godfather"	Orchestra conducted by Carlo Savina	Paramount	1972	Soundtrack	Track	2009
"Love Train"	The O'Jays	Philadelphia International	1973	Soul	Single	2006
"Lover Man (Oh, Where Can You Be?)"	Billie Holiday	Decca	1945	Jazz	Single	1989
"Lovesick Blues"	Emmett Miller & His Georgia Crackers	Okeh	1928	Country	Single	2007
"Lovesick Blues"	Hank Williams With His Drifting Cowboys	MGM	1949	Country	Single	2011
The Low End Theory	A Tribe Called Quest	Jive	1991	East Coast Hip-Hop	Album	2021
"Low Rider"	War	United Artists	1975	Funk	Single	2014
"Lucille"	Little Richard	Specialty	1957	Rock & roll	Single	2002
"Lullaby of Broadway"	Dick Powell	Brunswick	1935	Soundtrack	Single	2005
Lush Life	John Coltrane	Prestige	1961	Jazz	Album	2016
"Lush Life"	John Coltrane & Johnny Hartman	Impulse	1963	Jazz	Single	2000
"Mack the Knife"	Louis Armstrong & the All-Stars	Columbia	1955	Jazz	Single	1997
"Mack the Knife"	Bobby Darin	Atco	1959	Pop	Single	1999
Mad Dogs & Englishmen	Joe Cocker	A&M	1970	Rock	Album	2021
"Maggie May"	Rod Stewart	Mercury	1971	Rock	Single	2017
Maggot Brain	Funkadelic	Westbound	1971	Funk rock	Album	2026
Mahler: Das Lied von der Erde	Kathleen Ferrier & Julius Patzak with Vienna Philharmonic Orchestra conducted by Bruno Walter	London	1952	Classical	Album	1981
Mahler: Symphony No 1 in D major	Minneapolis Symphony Orchestra conducted by Dimitri Mitropoulos	Columbia Masterworks	1940	Classical	Album	1999
Mahler: Symphony No 2 in D major	Philharmonia Symphony Orchestra conducted by Otto Klemperer	EMI-Angel	1963	Classical	Album	2008
Mahler: Symphony No 8 in E flat major ("The Symphony of a Thousand")	Chicago Symphony Orchestra conducted by Georg Solti (with Vienna State Opera Chorus, Vienna Boys' Choir, & Wiener Singverein)	London	1971	Classical	Album	1998
Mahler: The Complete Symphonies	New York Philharmonic & London Symphony Orchestra conducted by Leonard Bernstein	Columbia Masterworks	1967	Classical	Album	2002
Maiden Voyage	Herbie Hancock	Blue Note	1965	Modal jazz	Album	1999
"Make the World Go Away"	Eddy Arnold	RCA	1965	Country	Single	1999
"Mama Tried"	Merle Haggard with The Strangers	Capitol	1968	Country	Single	1999
Man of La Mancha	Original Broadway Cast: Richard Kiley, Irving Jacobson, Joan Diener, Robert Rounseville, & Ray Middleton	Kapp	1965	Musical show	Album	2009
Manhattan Tower	Gordon Jenkins & his Orchestra	Capitol	1956	Traditional pop	Album	1998
"Manteca"	Dizzy Gillespie & his Orchestra	Victor	1947	Afro-Cuban Jazz	Single	1999
"Many Rivers to Cross"	Jimmy Cliff	Trojan	1969	Reggae	Single	2011
"Margaritaville"	Jimmy Buffett	ABC	1977	Pop	Single	2016
"Marie"	Tommy Dorsey & his Orchestra (featuring vocals sung by Jack Leonard)	Victor	1937	Traditional pop	Single	1998
"Mary Had a Little Lamb"	Thomas Alva Edison	N/A	1878	Experimental	Single	2018
Mary Poppins: Original Film Soundtrack	Cast: Julie Andrews, Dick Van Dyke, David Tomlinson, Karen Dotrice, Matthew Garber, etc.	Walt Disney	1964	Soundtrack	Album	2014
"Match Box Blues"	Blind Lemon Jefferson	Okeh	1927	Blues	Single	1999
"Maybellene"	Chuck Berry	Chess	1955	Rock & roll	Single	1988
"Mbube"	Solomon Linda and The Evening Birds	Gallo	1939	Vocal	Single	2007
"Me and Bobby McGee"	Janis Joplin	Columbia	1971	Rock	Single	2002
"Me and Mrs. Jones"	Billy Paul	Philadelphia International	1972	Soul	Single	2018
Meet Me in St. Louis	Judy Garland	Decca	1944	Vocal	Album	2005
Meet the Beatles!	The Beatles	Capitol	1964	Rock	Album	2001
Mendelssohn: Violin Concerto in E-Minor, Op. 64	Fritz Kreisler with Berlin State Opera Orchestra conducted by Leo Blech	Victor	1926	Classical	Album	1998
"Mercy Mercy Me (The Ecology)"	Marvin Gaye	Tamla	1971	Soul	Single	2002
Mercy, Mercy, Mercy! Live at "The Club"	The Cannonball Adderley Quintet	Capitol	1967	Soul Jazz	Album	2021
"The Message"	Grandmaster Flash and the Furious Five	Sugar Hill	1982	Hip-hop	Single	2012
Mexicantos	Los Panchos	Coda Records	1945	Mexican Music	Album	2012
"Midnight Special"	Lead Belly and Golden Gate Quartet	Victor	1940	Country blues	Album	2002
"Midnight Train to Georgia"	Gladys Knight & the Pips	Buddah	1973	Soul	Single	1999
Miles Ahead	Miles Davis with Gil Evans & His Orchestra	Columbia	1957	Jazz	Album	1994
Miles Smiles	Miles Davis Quintet	Columbia	1967	Jazz	Album	2016
Milestones	Miles Davis & his Sextet	Columbia	1958	Jazz	Album	2004
Mingus Ah Um	Charles Mingus	Columbia	1959	Jazz	Album	2013
Mingus Dynasty	Charles Mingus	Columbia	1960	Jazz	Album	1999
"Minnie the Moocher"	Cab Calloway & his Orchestra	Brunswick	1931	Jazz	Single	1999
The Miseducation of Lauryn Hill	Lauryn Hill	Ruffhouse	1998	Hip-Hop Soul	Album	2024
"Mission: Impossible"	Lalo Schifrin	Dot	1967	Theme music	Single	2017
"Misirlou"	Dick Dale	Deltone Records	1962	Surf rock	Single	2020
"Misty"	Erroll Garner	EmArcy	1954	Jazz	Single	1991
"Misty"	Johnny Mathis	Columbia	1959	Traditional pop	Single	2002
"Moanin'"	Art Blakey & the Jazz Messengers	Blue Note	1958	Jazz	Single	1998
Moanin'	Art Blakey & The Jazz Messengers	Blue Note	1959	Hard bop jazz	Album	2001
Modern Sounds in Country and Western Music	Ray Charles	ABC-Paramount	1962	Pop	Album	1999
"Mona Lisa"	Nat King Cole	Capitol	1950	Traditional pop	Single	1992
"Monday, Monday"	The Mamas & the Papas	Dunhill	1966	Sunshine Pop	Single	2008
"Money Honey"	Clyde McPhatter and The Drifters	Atlantic	1953	R&B	Single	1999
Monk's Music	Thelonious Monk & his Jazz Septet	Riverside	1957	Jazz	Album	2001
"Mood Indigo"	Duke Ellington & his Orchestra	Brunswick	1930	Jazz	Single	1975
"Moody's Mood for Love"	James Moody	Prestige	1952	Jazz	Single	2001
"Moon River"	Andy Williams	Columbia	1962	Traditional pop	Track from Moon River and Other Great Movie Themes	2018
"Moon River"	Henry Mancini & his Chorus	RCA Victor	1961	Pop	Single	1999
Moondance	Van Morrison	Warner Bros.	1970	R&B	Album	1999
"Moonglow"	Benny Goodman & his Quartet	Victor	1936	Jazz	Single	1998
"Moonlight Serenade"	Glenn Miller & his Orchestra	Bluebird	1939	Jazz	Single	1991
More Than a New Discovery	Laura Nyro	Verve Forecast	1967	Pop	Album	1999
"Move On Up"	Curtis Mayfield	Curtom	1972	Progressive soul	Single	2019
"Move On Up a Little Higher"	Mahalia Jackson	Apollo	1947	Gospel	Single	1998
Mozart: Die Zauberflöte	Cast: Helge Rosvaenge, Tiana Lemnitz, Wilhelm Strienz, Erna Berger, Gerhard Husch, etc. (with Berlin Philharmonic conducted by Thomas Beecham)	RCA Victor	1938	Opera	Album	1999
"Mr. Bojangles"	Nitty Gritty Dirt Band	Liberty	1970	Country	Single	2010
Mr. Fantasy	Traffic	Island	1967	Psychedelic rock	Album	1999
"Mr. Sandman"	The Chordettes	Cadence	1954	Traditional pop	Single	2002
"Mr. Tambourine Man"	The Byrds	Columbia	1965	Rock	Single	1998
"Mr. Tambourine Man"	Bob Dylan	Columbia	1965	Rock	Track	2002
"Mrs. Robinson"	Simon & Garfunkel	Columbia	1968	Pop	Single	1999
"Mule Skinner Blues"	Bill Monroe and his Blue Grass Boys	RCA Victor	1940	Bluegrass	Single	2009
Music from Big Pink	The Band	Capitol	1968	Rock	Album	1998
The Music from Peter Gunn	Henry Mancini & his Orchestra	RCA Victor	1959	Soundtrack	Album	1998
The Music Man Original Broadway Cast Album	Cast: Robert Preston, Barbara Cook, Iggie Wolfington, David Burns, Helen Raymond, Pert Kelton, Eddie Hodges, etc.	Capitol	1957	Musical show	Album	1998
Music of Albéniz & Granados	Andrés Segovia	Decca	1944	Classical	Album	1998
Mussorgsky: Pictures at an Exhibition	Vladimir Horowitz (on Piano) (arranged by V. Horowitz)	RCA Victor	1947	Classical	Album	1999
Mussorgsky: Pictures at an Exhibition	Chicago Symphony Orchestra conducted by Rafael Kubelík (arranged by Maurice Ravel)	Mercury	1951	Classical	Album	1998
Mussorgsky: "Song of the Flea"	Feodor Chaliapin	Victor	1926	Classical	Single	1999
"Mustang Sally"	Wilson Pickett	Atlantic	1967	R&B	Single	2000
My Aim is True	Elvis Costello	Stiff	1977	Rock	Album	2007
"My Black Mama (parts 1 & 2)"	Son House	Paramount	1930	Blues	Single	2013
"My Blue Heaven"	Gene Austin	Victor	1927	Traditional pop	Single	1978
"My Country 'Tis of Thee"	Marian Anderson	Victor	1939	Opera	Single	2009
My Fair Lady	Original Broadway Cast with Rex Harrison and Julie Andrews	Columbia	1956	Musical show	Album	1977
My Favorite Things	John Coltrane & his Quartet	Atlantic	1961	Modal jazz	Album	1998
"My Generation"	The Who	Decca	1966	Rock	Single	1999
"My Girl"	The Temptations	Gordy	1964	R&B	Single	1998
"My Guy"	Mary Wells	Motown	1964	Soul	Single	1999
"My Heart Belongs to Daddy"	Mary Martin	Decca	1938	Musical theatre	Single	2007
"My Mammy"	Al Jolson	Brunswick	1927	Soundtrack	Single	2011
"My Man"	Billie Holiday	Brunswick	1937	Jazz	Single	2018
"My Man" (from Ziegfeld Follies of 1921)	Fanny Brice (with Orchestra conducted by Rosario Bourdon)	Victor	1921	Traditional pop	Single	1999
"My Way"	Frank Sinatra	Reprise	1969	Traditional pop	Single	2000
"(You Make Me Feel Like) A Natural Woman"	Aretha Franklin	Atlantic	1967	Soul	Single	1999
"Nature Boy"	Nat King Cole	Capitol	1947	Jazz	Single	1999
"Near You"	Francis Craig	Bullet	1947	Pop	Single	2013
Negro Sinful Songs	Lead Belly	Musicraft	1939	Blues	Album	1998
Nevermind	Nirvana	DGC	1991	Grunge	Album	2018
Never Mind the Bollocks, Here's the Sex Pistols	Sex Pistols	Virgin	1977	Punk rock	Album	2015
Never Too Much	Luther Vandross	Epic	1981	R&B, Soul	Album	2025
"New San Antonio Rose"	Bob Wills and His Texas Playboys	Okeh	1940	Country	Single	1998
Nick of Time	Bonnie Raitt	Capitol	1989	Rock	Album	2015
"Night and Day"	Fred Astaire with Leo Reisman & his Orchestra	RCA Victor	1932	Musical theatre	Single	2004
A Night at Birdland Vol. 1, A Night at Birdland Vol. 2, A Night at Birdland Vol. 3	Art Blakey & his Quintet	Blue Note	1954	Jazz	Album	2000
A Night at the Opera	Queen	EMI	1975	Progressive rock	Album	2018
"A Night in Tunisia"	Dizzy Gillespie & his Sextet	Victor	1946	Jazz	Single	2004
"Night Train"	Jimmy Forrest	United	1952	R&B	Single	2006
"Nights in White Satin"	The Moody Blues	Deram	1967	Rock	Single	1999
"No Woman, No Cry"	Bob Marley and the Wailers	Tuff Gong	1975	Reggae	Single	2005
"Nobody"	Bert Williams	Columbia	1906	Traditional pop	Single	1981
"Nobody Knows the Trouble I've Seen"	Louis Armstrong	Decca	1938	Negro Spiritual	Single	2014
"Now He Sings, Now He Sobs"	Chick Corea	Blue Note	1968	Jazz	Single	1999
"Nuages"	Django Reinhardt and Stéphane Grappelli with the Quintet of the Hot Club of France	Decca	1946	Jazz	Single	2000
"Ode to Billie Joe"	Bobbie Gentry	Capitol	1967	Country	Single	1999
Off the Wall	Michael Jackson	Epic	1979	Pop	Album	2008
"Oh Happy Day"	Edwin Hawkins & his Singers	Buddah	1967	Gospel	Single	1999
"Oh Mary Don't You Weep"	Swan Silvertones	Vee Jay	1959	Negro Spiritual	Single	2020
"Oh, Pretty Woman"	Roy Orbison	Monument	1964	Pop	Single	1999
"Ohio"	Crosby, Stills, Nash & Young	Atlantic	1970	Hard rock	Single	2009
OK Computer	Radiohead	Parlophone	1997	Alternative rock	Album	2026
Okie from Muskogee	Merle Haggard	Capitol	1969	Country	Album	2017
Oklahoma! Original Broadway Cast Recording	Cast: Alfred Drake, Harry Stockwell, Joan Roberts, Betty Garde, Lee Dixon, Celeste Holm, Howard Da Silva, etc.	Decca	1943	Musical show	Album	1976
"Ol' Man River"	Paul Robeson with Paul Whiteman & his Concert Orchestra	Victor	1928	Musical theatre	Single	2006
Oliver! Original Broadway Cast Recording	Cast: Bruce Prochnik, Clive Revill, Georgia Brown, Danny Sewell, etc.	RCA Victor	1962	Musical show	Album	2008
"On Broadway"	The Drifters	Atlantic	1963	Soul	Single	2013
"On the Road Again"	Willie Nelson	Columbia	1980	Country rock	Single	2011
"One for My Baby (and One More for the Road)"	Frank Sinatra	Capitol	1958	Vocal jazz	Single	2005
"One Love"	The Wailers	Studio One	1965	Gospel	Single	2007
"One O'Clock Jump"	Count Basie	Decca	1937	Jazz	Single	1979
"Only the Lonely (Know the Way I Feel)"	Roy Orbison	Monument	1960	Pop	Single	1999
"Only You (And You Alone)"	The Platters	Mercury	1955	Doo-wop	Single	1999
"Orange Blossom Special"	The Rouse Brothers	Bluebird	1939	Country	Single	2026
"Ornithology"	Charlie Parker & his Septet	Dial	1946	Bebop	Single	1989
"Ory's Creole Trombone"	Kid Ory's Creole Orchestra (As Spike's Seven Pods of Pepper Orchestra)	Nordskog	1922	Jazz	Single	2024
"Over the Rainbow"	Judy Garland	MGM	1939	Soundtrack	Single	1981
"Over There"	Nora Bayes	Victor	1917	Traditional pop	Single	2008
"Oye Como Va"	Tito Puente	Tico	1963	Latin jazz	Single	2002
Paid in Full	Eric B. & Rakim	4th & B'way	1987	Hip-hop	Album	2026
"Paint It Black"	The Rolling Stones	Decca	1966	Rock	Single	2018
"Pan American Blues"	DeFord Bailey	Brunswick	1927	Blues	Single	2007
Pancho & Lefty	Merle Haggard & Willie Nelson	Epic	1983	Country	Album	2020
"Papa Was a Rollin' Stone"	The Temptations	Gordy	1972	Psychedelic soul	Single	1999
"Papa's Got a Brand New Bag" (Part 1)	James Brown	King	1965	R&B	Single	1999
"Paper Doll"	Mills Brothers	Decca	1943	Traditional pop	Single	1998
Parsley, Sage, Rosemary and Thyme	Simon & Garfunkel	Columbia	1966	Folk	Album	1999
"Pata Pata"	Miriam Makeba	Reprise	1967	R&B	Single	2019
Peace Be Still	Rev. James Cleveland & The Angelic Choir	Savoy	1963	Gospel	Album	1999
Pearl	Janis Joplin with Full Tilt Boogie Band	Columbia	1971	Rock	Album	2010
"Peg o' My Heart"	The Harmonicats	Vitacoustic	1947	Traditional pop	Single	1999
"Peggy Sue"	Buddy Holly	Coral	1957	Rockabilly	Single	1999
"Pennies from Heaven"	Bing Crosby	Decca	1936	Traditional pop	Single	2004
"Penny Lane"	The Beatles	Capitol	1967	Baroque pop	Single	2011
"People"	Barbra Streisand	Columbia	1964	Musical theatre	Single	1998
"People Get Ready"	The Impressions	ABC-Paramount	1965	Gospel	Single	1998
Pet Sounds	The Beach Boys	Capitol	1966	Rock	Album	1998
"Peter Gunn"	Henry Mancini & Jazz Ensemble	RCA Victor	1958	Soundtrack	Track	2005
"Piano Man"	Billy Joel	Columbia	1973	Soft rock	Single	2013
Piano Rags by Scott Joplin	Joshua Rifkin	Nonesuch	1970	Ragtime	Album	2020
"Piece of My Heart"	Big Brother & the Holding Company	Columbia	1968	Psychedelic rock	Single	1999
"Pine-Top's Boogie Woogie"	Pine Top Smith	Vocalion	1928	Jazz	Single	1983
Pink Moon	Nick Drake	Island	1972	Folk	Album	2026
The Pink Panther	Henry Mancini & his Orchestra	RCA Victor	1963	Soundtrack	Album	2001
Pinocchio: Motion Picture Soundtrack	Cast: Dickie Jones, Cliff Edwards, Walter Catlett, etc.	Victor	1940	Soundtrack	Album	2002
"Pistol Packin' Mama"	Al Dexter	Okeh	1943	Country	Single	2000
Play of Daniel	New York Pro Musica directed by Noah Greenberg	Decca	1958	Musical show	Album	1998
"Please Mr. Postman"	The Marvelettes	Tamla	1961	R&B	Single	2011
"Please, Please, Please"	James Brown & The Famous Flames	Federal	1956	R&B	Single	2001
"Please Send Me Someone to Love"	Percy Mayfield	Specialty	1950	R&B	Single	1999
"Pony Blues"	Charley Patton	Paramount	1929	Delta blues	Single	1999
Porgy and Bess	Miles Davis	Columbia	1959	Third stream jazz	Album	2000
Porgy and Bess	Ella Fitzgerald and Louis Armstrong	Verve	1958	Jazz	Album	2001
Portrait in Jazz	Bill Evans & his Trio	Riverside	1960	Jazz	Album	2007
"Precious Lord, Take My Hand"	Mahalia Jackson	Columbia	1956	Gospel	Single	2012
Pretenders	The Pretenders	Sire	1980	Punk rock	Album	2016
"The Prisoner's Song"	Vernon Dalhart	Victor	1924	Country	Single	1998
Prokofiev: Peter and the Wolf	Boston Symphony Orchestra conducted by Serge Koussevitzky; Narrated by Richard Hale	RCA Red Seal & RCA Victor	1939	Classical	Album	2008
Prokofiev: Piano Concerto no. 3 in C major, op. 26	London Symphony Orchestra conducted by Sergei Prokofiev; Piano by Piero Coppola	His Master's Voice	1932	Classical	Album	2009
"Proud Mary"	Creedence Clearwater Revival	Fantasy	1968	Rock	Single	1998
"Proud Mary"	Ike & Tina Turner	Liberty	1970	Funk rock	Single	2003
Puccini: La bohème	Cast: Victoria de los Angeles, Lucine Amara, Jussi Bjorling, Robert Merrill, Giorgio Tozzi, John Reardon, etc. (with Orchestra & Chorus conducted by Thomas Beecham)	RCA Victor	1956	Opera	Album	2000
Puccini: Tosca	Cast: Maria Callas, Giuseppe Di Stefano, Tito Gobbi, etc. (with La Scala Orchestra & Chorus conducted by Victor de Sabata)	EMI Classics	1953	Opera	Album	1987
"Purple Haze"	The Jimi Hendrix Experience	Track	1967	Rock	Single	2000
Purple Rain	Prince and The Revolution	Warner Bros.	1984	Minneapolis sound	Album	2011
"Puttin' On the Ritz"	Harry Richman (with Earl Burtnett & his Los Angeles Biltmore Hotel Orchestra),	Brunswick	1930	Soundtrack	Single	2005

== See also ==
- Grammy Award
- Grammy Hall of Fame
- List of Grammy Hall of Fame Award recipients (A–D)
- List of Grammy Hall of Fame Award recipients (E–I)
- List of Grammy Hall of Fame Award recipients (Q–Z)
