= Art Blakey et les Jazz-Messengers au club St. Germain =

Art Blakey et les Jazz-Messengers au club St. Germain, Vols. 1-3

Live album by Art Blakey and the Jazz Messengers
- Released: 1959
- Recorded: December 21, 1958
- Genre: Jazz
- Label: RCA France
- Producer: Daniel Filipacchi

Art Blakey and the Jazz Messengers chronology
Des Femmes Disparaissent (1958)	Art Blakey et les Jazz-Messengers au club St. Germain, Vols. 1-3 (1959)	At the Jazz Corner of the World (1959)

Professional ratings
Review scores
Source	Rating
AllMusic	4/5 stars
The Penguin Guide to Jazz Recordings	3/4 stars

Art Blakey et les Jazz-Messengers au club St. Germain are a set of live albums recorded on December 21, 1958, at the Club St. Germain in Paris, France by Art Blakey and the Jazz Messengers, released in three volumes by French RCA. All three albums have been collected on CD in the 2015 Sony box set, The Complete Columbia and RCA Albums Collection.

== Track listing ==
=== Vol. 1 ===
1. "Politely" (Bill Hardman)
2. "Whisper Not" (Benny Golson)
3. "Now's the Time" (Charlie Parker)
4. "The First Theme" (Traditional)

=== Vol. 2 ===
1. "Moanin' with Hazel" (Bobby Timmons)
2. "(Evidence) We Named it Justice" (Thelonious Monk)
3. "Blues March for Europe No. 1" (Benny Golson)
4. "Like Someone in Love" (Johnny Burke, Jimmy Van Heusen)

=== Vol. 3 ===
1. "Along Came Manon" (Golson)
2. "Out of the Past" (Golson)
3. "A Night in Tunisia" (Dizzy Gillespie, Frank Paparelli)
4. "Ending with the Theme" (Traditional)

== Personnel ==
- Art Blakey - drums
- Lee Morgan - trumpet
- Benny Golson - tenor saxophone
- Bobby Timmons - piano
- Jymie Merritt - bass
- Kenny Clarke - drums on A Night in Tunisia only
- Unknown - bongo on A Night in Tunisia only (thought to be Gana M'bow)
