= A Night at Birdland =

- Volume 1 (LP)

Live album by Art Blakey
- Released: August 1956 (Volume 1); December 1956 (Volume 2)
- Recorded: February 21, 1954
- Venues: Birdland, NYC
- Genre: Jazz
- Length: 37:37 (Vol. 1); 32:31 (Vol. 2)
- Labels: Blue Note; BLP 1521 (Vol. 1); BLP 1522 (Vol. 2)
- Producer: Alfred Lion

Art Blakey chronology
Blakey (1954)	A Night at Birdland (1956)	Drum Suite (1957)

A Night at Birdland
- Volume 2 (LP)

A Night at Birdland

A Night at Birdland (CD)
- Volume 2 (CD)

A Night at Birdland, Vols. 1 & 2 are a pair of separate but related live albums by the Art Blakey Quintet. They were recorded at the Birdland jazz club on February 21, 1954 and released on Blue Note in 1956. The performance was originally spread out over three 10" LPs as A Night at Birdland Vols. 1–3 (1954).

== Release history ==
Volumes 1 and 2 were issued on CD in 1987 with new artwork based on the original ten-inches and two additional tracks each: an alternate take of "Wee-Dot" and an improvisational piece titled "Blues" on Volume 1, and "The Way You Look Tonight" and "Lou's Blues" on Volume 2—issued as side's one and two of the 12" A Night at Birdland, Vol. 3 released by Toshiba three years previously in 1984—the first three of which were previously released in 1975 on Live Messengers (BN-LA473-J2), a 2 LP compilation.

The "RVG Editions" were released on CD in 2001, remastered by Rudy Van Gelder with the tracks in a different order and restoring the original album covers from Volumes 1 & 2 of the 10"s.

The concert was also included in The Complete Blue Note and Pacific Jazz Recordings of Clifford Brown box set.

== Reception ==
Professional ratings
Review scores
Source	Rating
AllMusic (Vol. 1)	link
AllMusic (Vol. 2)	link
Penguin Guide to Jazz (Vol. 1)	4/4 stars
Penguin Guide to Jazz (Vol. 2)	4/4 stars
The Rolling Stone Jazz Record Guide (Vol. 1)	5/5 stars
The Rolling Stone Jazz Record Guide (Vol. 2)	5/5 stars
Encyclopedia of Popular Music (Vol. 1)	5/5 stars
Encyclopedia of Popular Music (Vol. 2)	5/5 stars
Tom Hull (Vol. 1)	A−
Tom Hull (Vol. 2)	A−

The Penguin Guide to Jazz selected both albums as part of their "core collection."

A reviewer for All About Jazz said simply that "Blakey and company had clicked that night at Birdland."

AllMusic reviewer Scott Yanow stated that the first album "launches an initial breakthrough for Blakey and modern jazz in general, and defines the way jazz music could be heard for decades thereafter." Regarding the second album, Yanow wrote: "there are extraordinary high points, along with low points that either result from tiredness or a lack or preparation."

Bob Blumenthal, renowned hard-bop writer, refers to this as a historic jazz milestone.

== Track listing ==
=== A Night at Birdland, Volume 1 ===
Side 1
No.	Title	Music	Original release	Length
1.	"Announcement by Pee Wee Marquette"		A Night at Birdland, Vol. 1	0:58
2.	"Split Kick"	Horace Silver	A Night at Birdland, Vol. 1	8:44
3.	"Once in a While"	Bud Green; Michael Edwards	A Night at Birdland, Vol. 1	5:18
4.	"Quicksilver"	Horace Silver	A Night at Birdland, Vol. 1	6:58

Side 2
No.	Title	Music	Original release	Length
1.	"A Night in Tunisia"	Dizzy Gillespie; Frank Paparelli	A Night at Birdland, Vol. 2	9:20
2.	"Mayreh"	Horace Silver	A Night at Birdland, Vol. 2	6:19
Total length:				37:37

=== A Night at Birdland, Volume 2 ===
Side 1
No.	Title	Music	Original release	Length
1.	"Wee Dot"	J.J. Johnson; Leo Parker	A Night at Birdland, Vol. 2	7:19
2.	"If I Had You"	Jimmy Campbell and Reg Connelly; Ted Shapiro	A Night at Birdland, Vol. 3	3:31
3.	"Quicksilver [alternate master]"	Horace Silver	previously unreleased	8:46

Side 2
No.	Title	Writer(s)	Original release	Length
1.	"Now's the Time"	Charlie Parker	A Night at Birdland, Vol. 3	9:02
2.	"Confirmation"	Parker	A Night at Birdland, Vol. 3	9:12
Total length:				32:31

=== CD reissues ===
==== 1987 Edition ====
A Night at Birdland, Volume 1
No.	Title	Lyrics	Music	Length
1.	"Announcement by Pee Wee Marquette"			0:58
2.	"Split Kick"		Horace Silver	8:44
3.	"Once in a While"	Bud Green	Michael Edwards	5:18
4.	"Quicksilver"		Horace Silver	6:58
5.	"Wee-Dot (alternate take)" (previously released on Live Messengers [BN-LA473-J2])		J.J. Johnson, Leo Parker	6:53
6.	"Blues (Improvisation)" (previously released on Live Messengers [BN-LA473-J2])		Traditional	8:37
7.	"A Night in Tunisia"		Dizzy Gillespie, Frank Paparelli	9:20
8.	"Mayreh"		Horace Silver	6:19
Total length:				53:07

A Night at Birdland, Volume 2
No.	Title	Lyrics	Music	Length
1.	"Wee Dot"		J.J. Johnson, Leo Parker	7:19
2.	"If I Had You"	Jimmy Campbell and Reg Connelly	Ted Shapiro	3:31
3.	"Quicksilver [alternate master]"		Horace Silver	8:46
4.	"The Way You Look Tonight" (previously released on Live Messengers [BN-LA473-J2])	Dorothy Fields	Jerome Kern	9:59
5.	"Lou's Blues" (previously released on A Night at Birdland Vol. 3 [Toshiba (Japan), BNJ-61002])		Lou Donaldson	3:58
6.	"Now's the Time"		Charlie Parker	9:02
7.	"Confirmation"		Charlie Parker	9:12

==== Volume 1 ====
A Night at Birdland, Volume 1
No.	Title	Lyrics	Music	Length
1.	"Announcement by Pee Wee Marquette"			0:58
2.	"Split Kick"		Horace Silver	8:44
3.	"Once in a While"	Bud Green	Michael Edwards	5:18
4.	"Quicksilver"		Horace Silver	6:58
5.	"A Night in Tunisia"		Dizzy Gillespie, Frank Paparelli	9:20
6.	"Mayreh"		Horace Silver	6:19
7.	"Wee-Dot (alternate take)" (previously released on Live Messengers [BN-LA473-J2])		J.J. Johnson, Leo Parker	6:53
8.	"Blues (Improvisation)" (previously released on Live Messengers [BN-LA473-J2])		Traditional	8:37
Total length:				53:07

==== Volume 2 ====
A Night at Birdland, Volume 2
No.	Title	Lyrics	Music	Length
1.	"Wee Dot"		J.J. Johnson, Leo Parker	7:19
2.	"If I Had You"	Jimmy Campbell and Reg Connelly	Ted Shapiro	3:31
3.	"Quicksilver [alternate master]"		Horace Silver	8:46
4.	"Now's the Time"		Charlie Parker	9:02
5.	"Confirmation"		Charlie Parker	9:12
6.	"The Way You Look Tonight" (previously released on Live Messengers [BN-LA473-J2])	Dorothy Fields	Jerome Kern	9:59
7.	"Lou's Blues" (previously released on A Night at Birdland Vol. 3 [Toshiba (Japan), BNJ-61002])		Lou Donaldson	3:58

== Personnel ==
=== Art Blakey Quintet ===
- Clifford Brown – trumpet
- Lou Donaldson – alto saxophone
- Horace Silver – piano
- Curley Russell – bass
- Art Blakey – drums

=== Technical personnel ===
==== Original ====
- Alfred Lion – producer
- Rudy Van Gelder – recording engineer, mastering
- Francis Wolff – photography
- Reid Miles, John Hermansader – cover design
- Bob Bluementhal, Leonard Feather – liner notes

==== Reissue ====
- Michael Cuscuna – producer
- Rudy Van Gelder – 2001 remaster
- Ron McMaster – digital transfers
