= Hand On the Torch =

Hand on the Torch

Studio album by Us3
- Released: 16 November 1993
- Recorded: Flame Studios, London
- Genre: Jazz rap
- Length: 54:49
- Label: Blue Note
- Producer: Mel Simpson, Geoff Wilkinson

Us3 chronology
Hand on the Torch (1993)	Broadway & 52nd (1997)

Singles from Hand On the Torch
- 1. "Cantaloop (Flip Fantasia)" Released: October 10, 1992; 2. "Tukka Yoot's Riddim" Released: 1993; 3. "Cantaloop (Flip Fantasia)" Released: 1993 (UK reissue); 4. "I Got It Goin' On" Released: 1994; 5. "Eleven Long Years" Released: 1994

Hand on the Torch is the debut studio album by British jazz rap group Us3. It received widespread attention due to its mixture of jazz with hip-hop music, with material from popular jazz musicians of the 20th century being reimagined. The samples used on the album are from old Blue Note Records classics: the most famous was Herbie Hancock's "Cantaloupe Island", which Us3 used on the track "Cantaloop (Flip Fantasia)". It came out as a single having two different music videos.

In 2003, The Ultimate Hand on the Torch was released, including many of the songs used as sampling material on Hand on the Torch.

The album was a critical success and reached a widespread audience, with the work being nominated for a Grammy Award. It also was the first platinum-certified album put out by Blue Note Records.

== Critical reception ==
Professional ratings
Review scores
Source	Rating
AllMusic	4/5 stars
Robert Christgau	(choice cut)
Entertainment Weekly	A
Music Week (1993)	3/5 stars
Music Week (1994)	4/5 stars
The Observer	(favorable)
Orlando Sentinel	4/5 stars
Rolling Stone	2/5 stars
Select	3/5 medals
Jazz Forum	4/5 stars

The Boston Globe listed Hand on the Torch among the best albums of 1993, writing: "Of all the CDs exploring the hybrid of rap, hip-hop and jazz, none hit the target the way this one did."

In 2016, the musical publication MusicRadar labeled the release a "hip-hop tour de force".

== Track listing ==
1. "Cantaloop (Flip Fantasia)" (Kelly, Simpson, Wilkinson, Herbie Hancock) - 4:39
2. "I Got It Goin' On" (Powell, Kelly, Simpson, Wilkinson, Reuben Wilson) - 5:18
3. "Different Rhythms Different People" (Simpson, Wilkinson) - 1:16
4. "It's Like That" (Powell, Simpson, Wilkinson, Parker, Sonny Rollins) - 3:41
5. "Just Another Brother" (Powell, Simpson, Wilkinson, Freddie Hubbard) - 3:42
6. "Cruisin'" (Kelly, Simpson, Wilkinson) - 3:30
7. "I Go to Work" (Powell, Simpson, Wilkinson, Thelonious Monk) - 4:06
8. "Tukka Yoot's Riddim" (Taylor, Simpson, Wilkinson, Don Covay, Steve Cropper) - 5:41
9. "Knowledge of Self" (Kelly, Simpson, Wilkinson) - 4:18
10. "Lazy Day" (Powell, Simpson, Wilkinson, Joe Sample) - 4:40
11. "Eleven Long Years" (Taylor, Simpson, Wilkinson, Horace Silver, Hancock) - 3:47
12. "Make Tracks" (Powell, Simpson, Wilkinson, Silver, Duke Pearson) - 4:45
13. "The Darkside" (Kelly, Simpson, Wilkinson, Larry Mizell) - 5:19

== Sampling ==
- "Cantaloop (Flip Fantasia)" features samples from "Cantaloupe Island" as performed by Herbie Hancock, and the introduction by Pee Wee Marquette from "A Night in Birdland, Vol. 1" by Art Blakey Quintet.
- "I Got It Goin' On" features a sample from "Ronnie's Bonnie" as performed by Reuben Wilson.
- "Different Rhythms Different People" features vocal samples from "Art Blakey's Comment on Ritual" and "At the Cafe Bohemia, Vol. 2" by the Jazz Messengers.
- "It's Like That" features samples from "Alfie's Theme" as performed by Big John Patton and "Cool Blues" as performed by Lou Donaldson.
- "Just Another Brother" features samples from "Crisis" as performed by Art Blakey and the Jazz Messengers.
- "I Go to Work" features samples from "Straight No Chaser" as performed by Thelonious Monk.
- "Tukka Yoot's Riddim" features samples from "Sookie Sookie" as performed by Grant Green.
- "Lazy Day" features a sample from "Goin' Down South" as performed by Bobby Hutcherson.
- "Eleven Long Years" features samples from "Song for My Father" as performed by Horace Silver and "Blind Man, Blind Man" as performed by Herbie Hancock.
- "Make Tracks" features samples from "Filthy McNasty" as performed by Horace Silver and "Jeannine" as performed by Donald Byrd.
- "The Darkside" features a sample from "Steppin' into Tomorrow" as performed by Donald Byrd.

== Personnel ==
- Rap – Rahsaan Kelly and Kobie Powell (guest Tukka Yoot on Tukka Yoot's Riddim and Eleven Long Years)
- Trumpet – Gerard Presencer
- Trombone – Dennis Rollins
- Tenor Sax – Mike Smith
- Soprano and Tenor Sax – Ed Jones
- Guitar – Tony Remy
- Piano – Matt Cooper

== Charts ==
=== Weekly charts ===
Weekly chart performance for Hand on the Torch
Chart (1993–1994)	Peak position
Australian Albums (ARIA)	51
Austrian Albums (Ö3 Austria)	11
Dutch Albums (Album Top 100)	81
German Albums (Offizielle Top 100)	29
New Zealand Albums (RMNZ)	28
Swiss Albums (Schweizer Hitparade)	21
UK Albums (OCC)	40
US Billboard 200	31
US Top R&B/Hip-Hop Albums (Billboard)	21

=== Year-end charts ===
Year-end chart performance for Hand on the Torch
Chart (1994)	Position
US Top R&B/Hip-Hop Albums (Billboard)	61

== Certifications ==
Region	Certification	Certified units/sales
United States (RIAA)	Platinum	1,000,000^{^}
^{^} Shipments figures based on certification alone.
