= Art Blakey et les Jazz Messengers au Théâtre des Champs-Élysées =

Live album by Art Blakey and the Jazz Messengers
- Released: 1960
- Recorded: November 15, 1959; Théâtre des Champs-Élysées, Paris, France
- Genre: Hard bop
- Length: 33:55
- Label: RCA (France); 430.054
- Producer: Marcel Romano

Art Blakey and the Jazz Messengers chronology
Africaine (1959)	Art Blakey et les Jazz Messengers au Théâtre des Champs-Élysées (1960)	Paris Jam Session (1959)

Art Blakey et les Jazz Messengers au Théâtre des Champs-Élysées is a live album by Art Blakey & the Jazz Messengers recorded at the Théâtre des Champs-Élysées in Paris on November 15, 1959, and originally released on the French RCA Records label. The first official release of this material on CD was in the 2015 Sony box set, The Complete Columbia and RCA Albums Collection, with three bonus tracks.

== Reception ==
Professional ratings
Review scores
Source	Rating
Allmusic	3/5 stars

Allmusic gave the album 3 stars with Ken Dryden's review stating: "Most of the four pieces featured give the band a chance to stretch out and are the typical high-energy performances one has come to expect from bands led by the veteran drummer... The rather muddy sound of this live recording is somewhat disappointing ...therefore, it is worth the investment for obsessive Art Blakey collectors, while most jazz fans will gravitate to better-sounding releases first".

== Track listing ==
1. "Close Your Eyes" (Bernice Petkere) - 9:43
2. "Goldie" (Lee Morgan) - 9:03
3. "Ray's Idea" (Ray Brown, Dizzy Gillespie) - 5:03
4. "Lester Left Town" (Wayne Shorter) - 10:06

Bonus tracks on The Complete Columbia and RCA Albums Collection:

5. "Blues March" (Benny Golson) - 9:00
6. "Are You Real" (Golson) - 10:31
7. "A Night in Tunisia" (Gillespie & Paparelli) - 7:56

== Personnel ==
- Art Blakey – drums
- Lee Morgan – trumpet
- Wayne Shorter – tenor saxophone
- Walter Davis Jr. – piano
- Jymie Merritt – bass
