= Broadway & 52nd =

Studio album by Us3
- Released: 8 April 1997
- Genre: Jazz, hip-hop
- Length: 61:30
- Label: Blue Note
- Producer: Geoff Wilkinson, Jim Hawkins

Us3 chronology
Hand on the Torch (1993)	Broadway & 52nd (1997)	An Ordinary Day in an Unusual Place (2001)

Singles from Broadway & 52nd
- 1. "Come on Everybody (Get Down)" Released: 1997; 2. "I'm Thinking About Your Body" Released: 1997

Professional ratings
Review scores
Source	Rating
AllMusic	2.5/5 stars
Entertainment Weekly	B+
Rolling Stone	2/5 stars

Broadway & 52nd is the second studio album by jazz-rap group Us3 and has a more dark, conscious mood to it than their first album.

On the album, the group continued mixing live musicians with samples and hip hop lyrics. While the album was not as well received as the debut album Hand on the Torch, it represented a more mature approach to jazz rap. After the huge success of their first album, the president of Blue Note records allowed the trio to dig deep into Blue Note's vault and do whatever they wanted to do with its material.

The album's title comes from the street intersection in the middle of the theater district in New York City, which used to be the center of bebop in New York City.

== Track listing ==
1. "Intro" (Geoff Wilkinson, Hawkins, Powell, De Moraes) – 1:14
2. "Come on Everybody (Get down)" (Wilkinson, Hawkins, Armstead, McLean) – 5:49
3. "Caught Up in a Struggle" (Wilkinson, Hawkins, Vialva) – 3:42
4. "True to the Game" (Wilkinson, Hawkins, Armstead) – 3:34
5. "Snakes" (Wilkinson, Hawkins, Armstead) – 4:07
6. "I'm Thinking About Your Body" (Wilkinson, Hawkins, Vialva, McFerrin) – 5:24
7. "Grand Groove" (Wilkinson, Hawkins, Armsteads) – 3:36
8. "Nowadays" (Wilkinson, Hawkins, Armstead) – 4:24
9. "Sheep" (Wilkinson, Hawkins, Vialva) – 4:46
10. "Doin' a Crime" (Wilkinson, Hawkins, Vialva) – 5:37
11. "Recognise and Realise" (Wilkinson, Hawkins, Armstead, Vialva) – 5:40
12. "Time and Space" (Wilkinson, Hawkins, Vialva, Jordan) – 4:45
13. "Soul Brother" (Wilkinson, Hawkins, Armstead) – 3:59
14. "Hymn for Her" (Wilkinson, Hawkins) – 4:53

== Charts ==
Chart performance for Broadway & 52nd
Chart (1997)	Peak position
Australian Albums (ARIA)	90
Austrian Albums (Ö3 Austria)	28
Belgian Albums (Ultratop Flanders)	21
Dutch Albums (Album Top 100)	91
French Albums (SNEP)	47
German Albums (Offizielle Top 100)	80
New Zealand Albums (RMNZ)	39
Norwegian Albums (VG-lista)	26
Swiss Albums (Schweizer Hitparade)	48
UK Albums (OCC)	93
US Top R&B/Hip-Hop Albums (Billboard)	90
