= Lookin' Good =

Lookin' Good may refer to:

- Lookin' Good!, a 1961 album by Joe Gordon
- Lookin' Good (album), a 1980 album by Loretta Lynn
- "Lookin' Good", a 1967 song by Magic Sam from his album West Side Soul
- "Lookin' Good", a 2002 song by Jamie Cullum from his album Pointless Nostalgic
- "Lookin' Good", a 2005 song by the Bratz Rock Angelz from their album Rock Angelz
