= Joe Gordon (musician) =

American jazz trumpeter (1928–1963)

Joseph Henry Gordon (May 15, 1928 – November 4, 1963) was an American jazz trumpeter.

He was born in Boston, Massachusetts. His first professional gigs were in Boston in 1947; he played with Georgie Auld, Charlie Mariano, Lionel Hampton, Charlie Parker (1952–55 intermittently), Art Blakey (1954), and Don Redman.

In 1956 he toured the Middle East with Dizzy Gillespie's big band; he was a soloist on "A Night in Tunisia". Following this he played with Horace Silver.

After moving to Los Angeles, he recorded with Barney Kessel, Benny Carter, Harold Land, Shelly Manne (1958–60) and Dexter Gordon. He recorded as a bandleader for two sessions, and appeared on one recording with Thelonious Monk.

He has an uncredited role playing in Paul Horn's jazz band in the film Night Tide.

He died in Santa Monica, California, in a house fire on November 4, 1963.

== Discography ==
=== As leader ===
- 1955: Introducing Joe Gordon (EmArcy)
- 1961: Lookin' Good! (Contemporary)

=== As sideman ===
With Art Blakey

- Blakey (EmArcy, 1954)

With Donald Byrd

- Byrd's Eye View (Transition, 1955)

With Benny Carter

- Aspects (United Artists, 1959)

With Charlie Parker

- Boston - 1952 (Uptown Records, 1952)

With Dizzy Gillespie

- World Statesman (Norgran, 1956)
- Dizzy in Greece (Verve, 1957)

With Barney Kessel

- Some Like It Hot (Contemporary, 1959)

With Harold Land

- West Coast Blues! (Jazzland, 1960)

With Charlie Mariano

- The New Sounds From Boston (Prestige, 1951)
- Charlie Mariano Boston All Stars (Prestige, 1953) reissued on CD with New Sounds

With Shelly Manne

- Son of Gunn!! (Contemporary, 1959)
- At the Black Hawk 1 (Contemporary, 1959)
- At the Black Hawk 2 (Contemporary, 1959)
- At the Black Hawk 3 (Contemporary, 1959)
- At the Black Hawk 4 (Contemporary, 1959)
- At the Black Hawk 5 (Contemporary, 1959 [1991])
- Shelly Manne & His Men J.A.T.P./ Yesterdays (Pablo, 1960, Release 2003)
- The Proper Time (Contemporary, 1961)

With Thelonious Monk

- Thelonious Monk at the Blackhawk - with Charlie Rouse and Harold Land (Riverside, 1960)

With Herb Pomeroy

- Life Is a Many Splendored Gig (Roulette, 1957)

With Helen Humes

- Swingin' with Humes (Contemporary, 1961)

With Horace Silver

- Silver's Blue (Columbia, 1956)

With Jimmy Woods

- Awakening!! (Contemporary, 1962)

With June Christy and Bob Cooper

- Do-Re-Mi (June Christy and Bob Cooper album) (Capitol Records, 1961)

With Various Artists

- West Coast Days - Live At The Lighthouse (Fresh Sound)
