= Blakey (album) =

Studio album by Art Blakey
- Released: 1954
- Recorded: May 20 and September 3 & 8, 1954 1954; Fine Sound Studios, New York City
- Genre: Jazz
- Length: 73:28
- Label: EmArcy; MG 26030
- Producer: Bob Shad

Art Blakey chronology
A Night at Birdland, Vol. 3 (1954)	Blakey (1954)	A Night at Birdland, Vol. 1 (1956)

Blakey is an album by drummer Art Blakey recorded in 1954 and originally released on the EmArcy label as a 10-inch LP. The album was rereleased on CD in 1999 with bonus tracks originally released on the album Introducing Joe Gordon. The album has also been released as "The Complete Art Blakey on EmArcy", including four songs from a March 24 recording session.

== Reception ==
Professional ratings
Review scores
Source	Rating
Allmusic	4/5 stars

Allmusic awarded the album 4 stars calling it "a mandatory acquisition for Blakey fans and those who enjoy bop".

== Track listing ==
All compositions by Gigi Gryce except as indicated

1. "Minority" - 3:09
2. "Salute to Birdland" - 3:01
3. "Eleanor" - 2:55
4. "Futurity" - 2:57
5. "Simplicity" - 2:52
6. "Strictly Romantic" - 2:47
7. "Hello" - 2:41
8. "Mayreh" (Horace Silver) - 3:18
9. "Rifftide" (Coleman Hawkins) - 6:27 Bonus track on CD reissue
10. "Lady Bob" (Quincy Jones) - 6:54 Bonus track on CD reissue
11. "Grasshopper" (Jones) - 6:58 Bonus track on CD reissue
12. "The Theme" (Kenny Dorham) - 7:39 Bonus track on CD reissue
13. "Bous Bier" (Jones) - 6:46 Bonus track on CD reissue
14. "Xochimilco" (Joe Gordon) - 6:18 Bonus track on CD reissue
15. "Evening Lights" (Gordon) - 4:21 Bonus track on CD reissue
16. "Body and Soul" (Frank Eyton, Johnny Green, Edward Heyman, Robert Sour) - 4:25 Bonus tracks on CD reissued. Originally released by Emarcy records as Introducing Joe Gordon in 1954 and then again on 12 inch LP in 1955 with 2 extra tunes added.

== Personnel ==
- Art Blakey - drums
- Joe Gordon - trumpet
- Gigi Gryce - alto saxophone (tracks 1–8)
- Charlie Rouse - tenor saxophone (tracks 9–16)
- Walter Bishop, Jr. (tracks 1–8), Junior Mance (tracks 9–16) - piano
- Bernie Griggs (tracks 1–8), James Schenk (tracks 9–16) - bass
