= A Night at Birdland, Vols. 1–3 =

A Night at Birdland
- Volume 1

Live album by the Art Blakey Quintet
- Released: July 1954 (Volume 1); October 1954 (Volume 2); November 1954 (Volume 3)
- Recorded: February 21, 1954
- Venue: Birdland; New York City
- Genre: Hard bop
- Length: 21:58 (Volume 1); 22:58 (Volume 2); 21:45 (Volume 3)
- Label: Blue Note; BLP 5037 (Vol. 1); BLP 5038 (Vol. 2); BLP 5039 (Vol. 3)
- Producer: Alfred Lion

The Art Blakey Quintet chronology
| New Sounds (1952) | A Night at Birdland (1954) | Blakey (1954) |

A Night at Birdland, Vols. 1–3 are three separate but related 10″ LPs by the Art Blakey Quintet recorded live at the Birdland jazz club on February 21, 1954, and released on Blue Note later that year, in July, October and November respectively. The quintet features horn section Clifford Brown and Lou Donaldson and rhythm section Horace Silver, Curly Russell and Blakey.

== Background ==
=== Recording ===
The recording was produced by Alfred Lion and engineered by Rudy Van Gelder for Blue Note. The reissues were produced by Michael Cuscuna.

They are considered some of the earliest hard bop recordings.

=== Release history ===
After Blue Note discontinued their 10″ series, A Night at Birdland was recompiled on two 12″ LPs and given new artwork. A Night at Birdland, Vol. 1 (BLP 2037) was put on Side A of Volume 1 (BLP 1521) backed with two tracks of the three tracks from A Night at Birdland, Vol. 2 (BLP 2038) ("Mayreh" and "A Night in Tunisia"), with Volume 2 (BLP 1522) comprising A Night at Birdland, Vol. 3 (BLP 2039), "Wee-Dot" and an alternate take of "Quicksilver".

The complete recordings weren't available commercially until 1984 when the remaining four tracks were released in Japan by Toshiba as A Night at Birdland, Vol. 3 and the whole concert was released as part of the Complete Blue Note and Pacific Jazz Recordings of Clifford Brown box set, before being released on the CD reissues of the twelve-inches three years later.

== Reception ==
Professional ratings
Review scores
| Source | Rating |
|---|---|
| AllMusic | 4/5 stars |
| AllMusic | 4.5/5 stars |
| AllMusic | 4/5 stars |

The Penguin Guide to Jazz put the recording in their "core collection".

A reviewer for All About Jazz said simply that "Blakey and company had clicked that night at Birdland."

AllMusic mentions that, on this first album, "all of the participants [are] in inspired form. Classic bop."

Bob Blumenthal, renowned hard bop writer, refers to this as a historical jazz milestone.

== Track listing ==
=== A Night at Birdland, Volume 1 ===
Side 1
| No. | Title | Music | Length |
|---|---|---|---|
| 1. | "Announcement by Pee Wee Marquette" | | 0:58 |
| 2. | "Split Kick" | Horace Silver | 8:44 |
| Total length: | | | 9:42 |

Side 2
| No. | Title | Music | Length |
|---|---|---|---|
| 1. | "Once in a While" | Bud Green; Michael Edwards | 5:18 |
| 2. | "Quicksilver" | Horace Silver | 6:58 |
| Total length: | | | 12:16 21:58 |

- The spoken announcement by Pee Wee Marquette is sampled in the Us3 song "Cantaloop (Flip Fantasia)".

=== A Night at Birdland, Volume 2 ===
Side 1
| No. | Title | Writer(s) | Length |
|---|---|---|---|
| 1. | "Wee-Dot" | J. J. Johnson; Leo Parker | 7:19 |
| 2. | "Mayreh" | Horace Silver | 6:19 |
| Total length: | | | 13:38 |

Side 2
| No. | Title | Writer(s) | Length |
|---|---|---|---|
| 3. | "A Night in Tunisia" | Dizzy Gillespie; Frank Paparelli | 9:20 |
| Total length: | | | 9:20 22:58 |

=== A Night at Birdland, Volume 3 ===
Side 1
| No. | Title | Music | Length |
|---|---|---|---|
| 1. | "Now's the Time" | Charlie Parker | 9:02 |
| 2. | "If I Had You" | Jimmy Campbell and Reg Connelly; Ted Shapiro | 3:31 |
| Total length: | | | 12:33 |

Side 2
| No. | Title | Music | Length |
|---|---|---|---|
| 3. | "Confirmation" | Charlie Parker | 9:12 |
| Total length: | | | 9:12 21:45 |

== Personnel ==
=== Art Blakey Quintet ===
- Clifford Brown – trumpet
- Lou Donaldson – alto saxophone
- Horace Silver – piano
- Curley Russell – bass
- Art Blakey – drums

=== Technical personnel ===
- Rudy Van Gelder – recording engineer, mastering
- Alfred Lion – producer
- Reid Miles – cover design
- Francis Wolff – photography
