= Des Femmes Disparaissent (soundtrack) =

Des femmes disparaissent

Soundtrack album by Art Blakey and The Jazz Messengers
- Released: 1959
- Recorded: December 18 & 19, 1958; Paris, France
- Genre: Jazz
- Length: 30:15
- Label: Fontana (France); 660 224 MR
- Producer: Marcel Romano

Art Blakey and The Jazz Messengers chronology
1958 - Paris Olympia (1958)	Des femmes disparaissent (1959)	Art Blakey et les Jazz-Messengers au club St. Germain (1958)

Des femmes disparaissent is a soundtrack album to the French film of the same name by drummer Art Blakey's Jazz Messengers recorded in Paris in 1958 and originally released on the French Fontana label. Originally released as a 10 inch LP it has been subsequently released in LP and CD formats with additional French soundtrack material from the same period by other jazz artists. A few of the songs on the soundtrack are original songs by Benny Golson like "Whisper Not", "Just for Myself", "Cry a Blue Tear", "Blues on my Mind", and "Fair Weather".

The film Des femmes disparaissent (Women Disappear), starring Robert Hossein, Magali Noël and Estella Blain, was directed by Édouard Molinaro and distributed in the US as The Road to Shame.

== Reception ==
Professional ratings
Review scores
Source	Rating
Allmusic	3/5 stars

Scott Yanow of Allmusic stated: "Soundtrack albums are generally music-minus-one affairs, the 'one' being the film. The music for soundtracks is meant to accentuate the visual story but, taken by itself, it usually sounds very incomplete. This CD, only recommended to completists, mostly features Art Blakey's Jazz Messengers in December 1958 late at night, playing short themes and sketches that were used in the French film Des Femmes Disparaissent".

== Track listing ==
All compositions by Art Blakey and Benny Golson except track 5 and tracks 10–14 written by Blakey.

1. "Générique" ("Blues on my Mind") - 2:44
2. "Pierre et Béatrice" ("Cry a Blue Tear") - 1:03
3. "Nasol" - 0:41
4. "Tom" - 1:13
5. "Poursuite dans la ruelle" - 0:19
6. "Ne chuchote pas" ("Whisper Not") - 1:25
7. "Mambo dans la voiture" ("Sakeena") - 1:17
8. "Merlin" - 0:45
9. "Juste pour eux seuls" ("Just for Myself") - 2:25
10. "Blues pour Doudou" - 3:13
11. "Blues pour Marcel" - 4:19
12. "Blues pour Vava" - 3:29
13. "Pasquier" - 1:00
14. "Quaglio" - 0:45
15. "La Divorcée de Léo Fall" - 2:10
16. "Suspense, Tom et Nasol" - 0:39
17. "Des femmes disparaissent" ("Blues on my Mind") - 1:02
18. "Final pour Pierre et Béatrice" ("Fair Weather") - 0:58

== Personnel ==
- Art Blakey - drums
- Lee Morgan - trumpet
- Benny Golson - tenor saxophone
- Bobby Timmons - piano
- Jymie Merritt - bass
