= Les Liaisons dangereuses (film) =

1959 drama film by Roger Vadim

Les liaisons dangereuses
- French film poster
- Directed by: Roger Vadim
- Written by: Roger Vailland; Claude Brulé
- Based on: novel by Choderlos de Laclos
- Starring: Jeanne Moreau; Gérard Philipe; Annette Vadim; Madeleine Lambert
- Cinematography: Marcel Grignon
- Edited by: Victoria Mercanton
- Music by: Thelonious Monk; Duke Jordan (as Jack Marray)
- Distributed by: Ariane Distribution
- Release date: 9 September 1959
- Running time: 110 minutes
- Country: France
- Language: French
- Budget: US$4.3 million
- Box office: 4,325,341 admissions (France)

Les liaisons dangereuses (Dangerous Liaisons) is a 1959 French drama romance film loosely based on the 1782 novel by Pierre Choderlos de Laclos, set in present-day France.

It was directed by Roger Vadim, and stars Jeanne Moreau, Gerard Phillipe, and Annette Vadim. It was a French/Italian co-production. The score was performed by Thelonious Monk.

== Synopsis ==
In present-day France, Valmont and Juliette de Merteuil are a married couple who help each other have extramarital affairs.

Juliette's latest lover, Court, breaks up with her in order to be free to pursue his plan to marry the 16-year-old Cecile. Seeking revenge, Juliette encourages Valmont to seduce the virginal Cecile while she holidays at the ski resort of Megève. Cecile is in love with a student, Danceny, but he refuses to marry her until he can support her.

While on holiday, Valmont meets the beautiful and virtuous Marianne, originally from Denmark, who has a small child and is happily married to a young civil servant. He decides to pursue her as well, at first by befriending her and being completely honest as to what sort of person he is.

Valmont succeeds in seducing the virginal Cecile by blackmailing her. Cecile confesses the act to Juliette who encourages her to keep seeing Valmont, and Cecile does so.

Valmont then follows Marianne to Paris and succeeds in seducing her as well. Eventually Valmont genuinely falls in love with Marianne, and she prepares to leave her husband for him. Juliette becomes jealous and sends Marianne a telegram supposedly from Valmont, but with Valmont's reluctant consent, breaking it off with her and saying the seduction was all a game.

Cecile tells Juliette that she is pregnant by Valmont and asks for her help in persuading Danceny to marry her. Instead, Juliette tells Danceny that he should not marry and plans to seduce Danceny herself.

Valmont and Cecile tell Danceny about Juliette's duplicity. However, Juliette then tells him that Cecile and Valmont slept together, and Danceny strikes Valmont, accidentally killing him. While Danceny faces murder charges, Marianne loses her reason with the shock of Valmont's rejection of her and subsequent death.

Valmont has written letters to Juliette throughout the film describing both their actions. Juliette burns the letters, but catches fire herself and is disfigured for life doing so.

== Cast ==
- Gérard Philipe as Valmont
- Jeanne Moreau as Juliette Valmont née de Merteuil
- Jeanne Valérie as Cécile Volanges
- Annette Vadim as Marianne Tourvel
- Simone Renant as Madame Volanges
- Jean-Louis Trintignant as Danceny
- Nicolas Vogel as Court
- Boris Vian as Prévan
- François Perrot as A guest
- Gillian Hills

== Production ==
Fourteen-year-old British school girl Gillian Hills was cast in a lead role, but public outcry meant this was recast, and Hills played a smaller part.

Gerard Philippe reportedly took the role in response to the critical failure of his film The Gambler (1958). Gérard Philipe died almost eight weeks after the film's release. It was the last of his films that was released before his death.

=== Censorship ===
There was concern the film would not be allowed to screen in France at all. Eventually, permission was granted to show it to adults. In September 1959, the film was denied an export license because it was "unrepresentative of French film art", and thus could not be shown outside France.

Two weeks into the film's run in Paris, the film was seized as the result of civil action taken against it by the Society of Men of Letters, who said they were acting to protect the reputation of the original work. They wanted its title changed to Les Liaisons Dangereuses '60. This was done.

The movie was a massive hit at the French box office – the most successful domestic film since 1954.

Eventually, the film was allowed to be exported to Japan, Greece, and the Scandinavian countries. Then, in 1961, a full export licence was granted; US and Canadian distribution rights were bought by Astor Films for a reported record sum.

=== US release ===
New York censors only allowed the film to be shown after it had been edited to a "darkened" print of two "objectionable" nude scenes (involving Annette Vadim and Jeanne Valerie).

In February 1962, the film was pulled from a theater in Montclair, New Jersey, at the request of the police commissioner, as authorized by the Town Council. This occurred after a letter writing campaign following the film's condemnation from the pulpit of a local Roman Catholic Church. The film had been running for nearly three weeks at that point. The theater continued its run beginning ten days later, the theater's management citing contractual obligations to its American distributor.

== Musical score and soundtrack ==
The film's score was performed by Thelonious Monk, drawing on his existing compositions, as time constraints and a health crisis meant he was unable to compose new material. The original recordings by Monk, including music not used in the film, were released for the first time in 2017 as a double album in both vinyl and CD editions.

Les Liaisons Dangereuses 1960

Soundtrack album by Art Blakey and the Jazz Messengers with Barney Wilen
- Released: 1960
- Recorded: July 28–29, 1959
- Studios: Nola's Penthouse Sound Studios, NYC
- Genre: Film score
- Length: 38:54
- Labels: Fontana; 680 203 TL
- Producer: Marcel Romano

Art Blakey and the Jazz Messengers chronology
At the Jazz Corner of the World (1959)	Les Liaisons Dangereuses 1960 (1960)	Africaine (1959)

Additional music for the extended party scene by Jack Marray (a pseudonym for Duke Jordan) was recorded by Art Blakey and the Jazz Messengers with Barney Wilen. The soundtrack, featuring only those tracks recorded by Art Blakey and The Jazz Messengers with Barney Wilen, was originally released on the French Fontana label.

=== Reception ===
Professional ratings
Review scores
Source	Rating
Allmusic	3/5 stars

AllMusic reviewer Scott Yanow states of the Blakey album that "In general, the music manages to stand on its own with the ensemble getting to stretch out a bit on the rare material".

=== Track listing ===
All compositions by Duke Jordan

1. "No Problem (1st Version)" – 7:23
2. "No Hay Problema" – 4:35
3. "Prelude In Blue (À "L' Esquinade")" – 6:59
4. "Valmontana (1st Version)"- 4:46
5. "Miguel's Party" – 4:23
6. "Prelude In Blue (Chez Miguel)" – 5:54
7. "No Problem (2nd Version)" – 6:00
8. "Weehawken Mad Pad" – 1:50
9. "Valmontana (2nd Version)" – 4:33
10. "No Hay Problema (2nd Version)" – 3:53 Bonus track on CD reissue

Most tracks on Duke Jordan's record with the same title in 1962 have the same melodies, but with different track titles. "Prelude In Blue" with "Weehawken Mad Pad" was retitled "The Feeling of Love"; "Valmontana" was changed to "Jazz Vendor"; and "Miguel's Party" to "Subway Inn". The title "No Problem" was left intact.

=== Musicians ===
- Art Blakey – drums
- Lee Morgan – cornet (tracks 1 & 4–9)
- Barney Wilen – tenor saxophone, soprano saxophone (tracks 1 & 3–9)
- Duke Jordan (track 3), Bobby Timmons (tracks 1, 2 & 4–10) – piano
- Jymie Merritt – bass
- Tommy Lopez, Willie Rodriguez – congas (tracks 2–10)
- Johnny Rodriguez – bongos (tracks 2–10)

== See also ==
- Dangerous Liaisons
