= At the Black Hawk 3 =

Live album by Shelly Manne & His Men
- Released: 1960
- Recorded: September 22–24, 1959
- Venue: The Black Hawk in San Francisco, California
- Genre: Jazz
- Length: 54:11
- Label: Contemporary M3579/S7579
- Producer: Lester Koenig

Shelly Manne chronology
At the Black Hawk 2 (1959)	At the Black Hawk 3 (1960)	At the Black Hawk 4 (1959)

At the Black Hawk 3 is a live album by drummer Shelly Manne's group Shelly Manne & His Men, recorded at the Black Hawk in San Francisco, California, in 1959 and released on the Contemporary label. The album was the third volume of four originally released in 1960. In 1991, the albums were re-released on CD with bonus tracks along with a fifth volume of unreleased recordings, and a Complete Live at the Black Hawk box set was released in 2010.

== Reception ==
Professional ratings
Review scores
Source	Rating
AllMusic	4/5 stars
The Rolling Stone Jazz Record Guide	3/5 stars

The AllMusic review by Scott Yanow states: "Considering how much music was documented, it is fortunate that trumpeter Joe Gordon, tenorman Richie Kamuca, pianist Victor Feldman, bassist Monty Budwig and drummer Shelly Manne were in top form for this enjoyable gig. The music is high-quality straightforward and uncomplicated bebop".

== Track listing ==
1. "I Am in Love" (Cole Porter) - 12:22
2. "Whisper Not" (Benny Golson) - 10:04
3. "Black Hawk Blues" (Shelly Manne) - 19:20
4. "Whisper Not" [alternate take] (Golson) - 12:25 Bonus track on CD reissue
- Recorded at the Black Hawk, San Francisco on September 22 (track 3), September 23 (track 2) and September 24 (tracks 1 & 4), 1959.

== Personnel ==
- Shelly Manne - drums
- Joe Gordon - trumpet
- Richie Kamuca - tenor saxophone
- Victor Feldman - piano
- Monty Budwig - bass
