= Gerard Presencer =

English jazz trumpeter (born 1972)

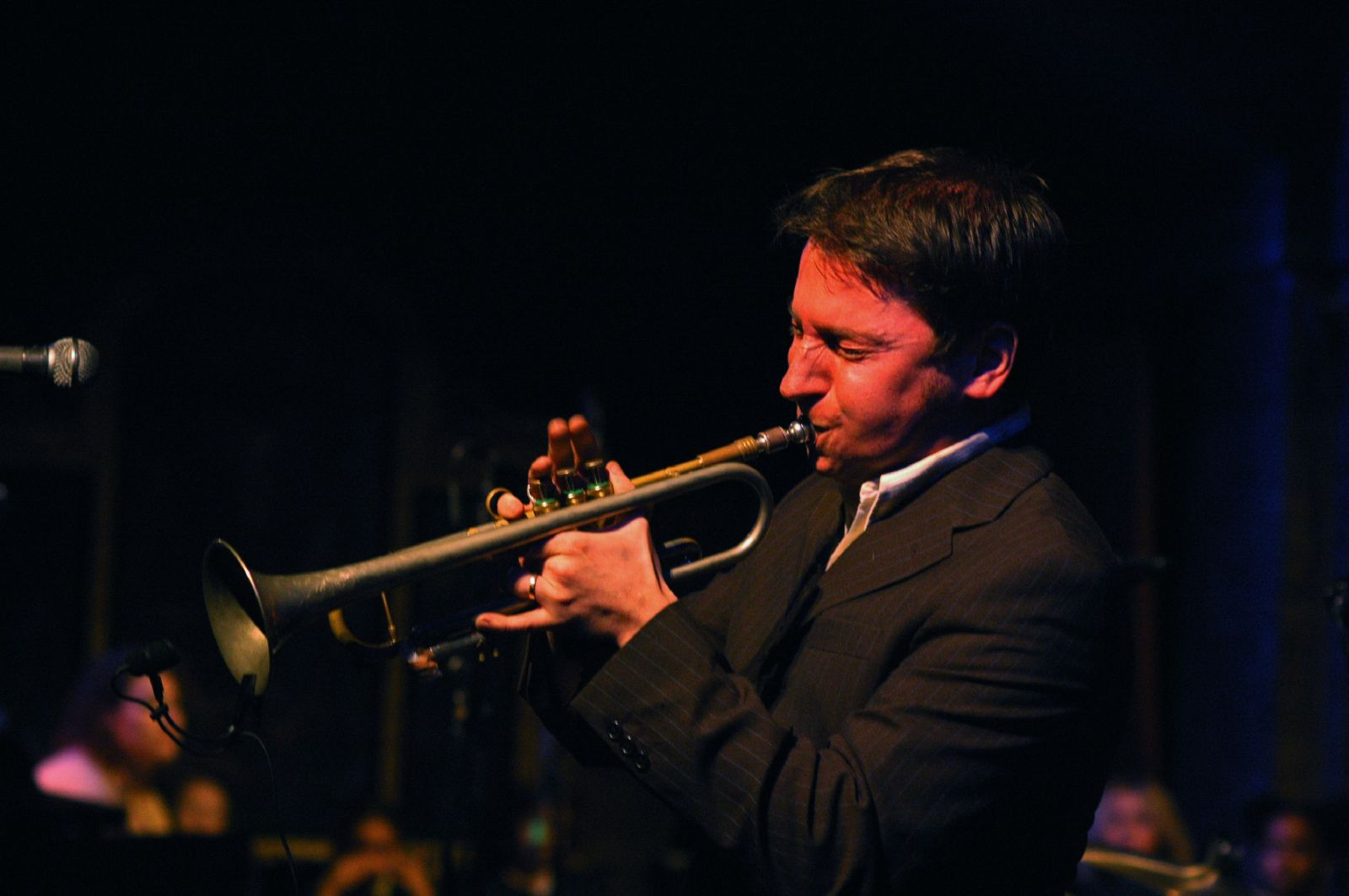

Background information
- Born: 12 September 1972 (age 53); Watford, Hertfordshire, England
- Genres: Jazz, contemporary classical
- Occupation: Musician
- Instrument: Trumpet
- Years active: 1987–present
- Formerly of: DR Big Band

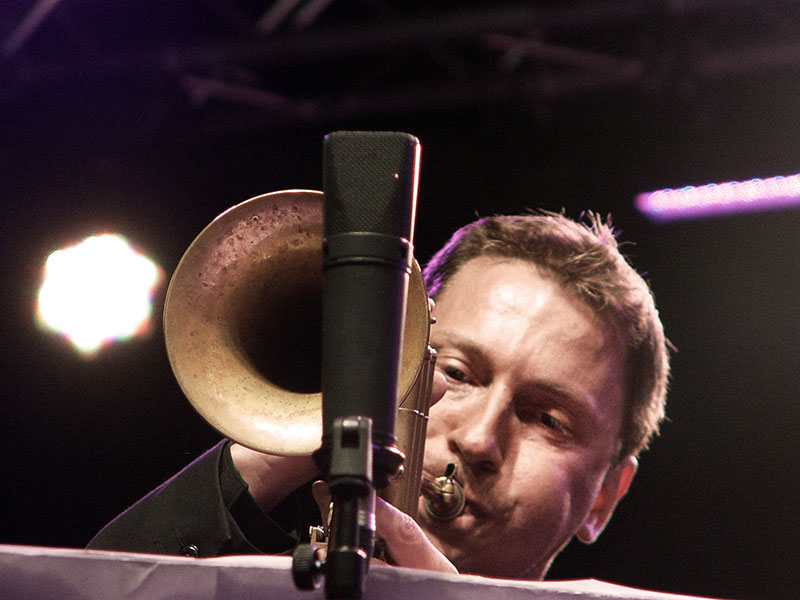
Gerard Presencer, Aarhus, Denmark, 2010

Gerard Presencer (born 12 September 1972) is an English jazz trumpeter.

== Biography ==
Presencer showed his first interest in what was to become his chosen instrument, the trumpet, at the age of nine. He attributes his early determination to become a trumpeter to hearing Roy Eldridge's solo from a Jazz at the Philharmonic concert. He has cited Dizzy Gillespie, Lee Morgan, Freddie Hubbard, Kenny Wheeler, Woody Shaw, and Clifford Brown as early influences.

When Presencer was 11 years old, he became the youngest trumpeter with the National Youth Jazz Orchestra. At the age of 18, he began playing with pianist Stan Tracey, in his big band, octet, septet, and in duo, playing a live concert at London's Queen Elizabeth Hall, later released on Blue Note Records.

Presencer worked with British musicians Peter King, John Dankworth, John Taylor, Ronnie Scott, Norma Winstone, and Mike Gibbs, as well as with international musicians, including Johnny Griffin, Chris Potter, Mark Turner, Niels-Henning Ørsted Pedersen, Randy Brecker, Red Rodney, Herbie Hancock, Chick Corea, John Abercrombie, and Bob Berg. Pesencer is a member of Charlie Watts' various jazz groups, with which he has recorded five albums, and was a featured soloist on US3's Cantaloop, Blue Note's biggest-selling album of the 1990s. He has also released albums as a band leader.

In January 2010, Presencer was as a soloist with the Danish Radio Big Band for the opening of the Danish National Concert Hall. Later the same year, he became a regular member of the big band and moved to Copenhagen.

== Other genres ==
Presencer has collaborated frequently with contemporary classical music composer Siobhan Lamb as an improvising soloist. Two albums were released in 2012 by the Naxos label Proprius: Meditations and The Nightingale and the Rose.

As a session musician, Presencer has recorded with Sting, Jamiroquai, Zero 7, James Brown, Ray Charles, Joni Mitchell, and Jonny Greenwood.

Presencer is the featured soloist on the 2011 BAFTA Award-winning score for the computer game L.A. Noire, which features Mark Turner, John Taylor, David Freidman, Jeff Ballard, and Larry Grenadier.

== Teaching ==
Presencer was the Head of the Jazz Department at the Royal Academy of Music from 1999 until 2010 and was Head of the Brass Department at The Jazz Institute, Berlin, from 1999 to 2016. He has given workshops in European jazz conservatories (including Amsterdam, Helsinki and Copenhagen).

In 2015, his book about the technical requirements of trumpet playing in improvised music was released by Warwick Music.

== Discography ==
=== As leader ===
- Platypus (Linn, 1998)
- The Optimist (Linn, 2000)
- Dreams with Tony Coe (Zephyr, 2001)
- Chasing Reality (ACT, 2003)
- Groove Travels with Danish Radio Big Band (Edition, 2016)

=== As sideman ===
With the Brand New Heavies

- Brother Sister (FFRR, 1994)
- Original Flava (Acid Jazz, 1994)
- Shelter (Delicious Vinyl, 1997)

With Stan Tracey

- Live at the QEH (Blue Note, 1994)
- For Heaven's Sake (Cadillac, 1996)
- The Durham Connection (33 Records, 1999)

With Charlie Watts

- From One Charlie (UFO, 1991)
- Warm & Tender (Continuum, 1993)
- Long Ago & Far Away (Pointblank, 1996)
- Watts at Scott's (Black Box, 2004)
- Charlie Watts Meets the Danish Radio Big Band (Impulse!, 2017)

With others

- Charly Antolini, Recorded at the BBC Studio London (Bell, 1991)
- Thilo Berg, Live Blues for Ella (Mons, 1993)
- Matt Bianco, Gran Via (RTI Music, 1995)
- Matt Bianco, Lost in You (Catch, 1995)
- Naimee Coleman, Silver Wrists (Chrysalis, 1996)
- Laurence Cottle, The Art of Jazz (KPM Music, 1993)
- Laurence Cottle, The Laurence Cottle Quintet Live! (Jazzizit, 1995)
- Alec Dankworth & John Dankworth, Nebuchadnezzar (Jazz House, 1994)
- Alec Dankworth & John Dankworth, Rhythm Changes (Jazz House, 1995)
- Gabrielle, Rise (Universal, 1999)
- Joe Gallivan, Innocence (Cadence, 1992)
- Tim Garland, Made by Walking (Stretch, 2000)
- Tim Garland, Return to the Fire (Edition, 2015)
- Stephane Grappelli, Martin Taylor, Celebrating Grappelli (Honest, 1997)
- Jonny Greenwood, Bodysong (Parlophone, 2003)
- Hue & Cry, Showtime! (Permanent, 1994)
- Incognito, 100 and Rising (Talkin' Loud, 1995)
- Peter King, Speed Trap (Jazz House, 1996)
- Peter King, Lush Life (Miles Music, 1999)
- Kristin Korb, Finding Home (Double K Music, 2014)
- Joe Locke, 4 Walls of Freedom (Sirocco Music, 2003)
- Claire Martin, Make This City Ours (Linn, 1997)
- Claire Martin, He Never Mentioned Love (Linn, 2007)
- Paddy McAloon, I Trawl the Megahertz (Liberty, 2003)
- Joni Mitchell, Both Sides Now (Reprise, 2000)
- Tete Montoliu, Peter King, New Year's Morning '89 (Fresh Sound, 1989)
- Mother Earth, The People Tree (Acid Jazz, 1993)
- Mother Earth, You Have Been Watching (Focus, 1995)
- National Youth Jazz Orchestra, Cookin' with Gas (NYJO, 1990)
- Pet Shop Boys, Yesterday When I Was Mad (Parlophone, 1994)
- Pet Shop Boys, Alternative (Parlophone, 1995)
- PMJ, Love Not Truth (P-Vine, 2006)
- Chris Potter, Transatlantic (Red Dot Music, 2011)
- Ragga Twins, Freedom Train (Positiva, 1995)
- Ragga Twins, Rinsin Lyrics (Positiva, 1995)
- Shakatak, Let the Piano Play (Victor, 1997)
- Shakatak, Shinin' On (Instinct, 1998)
- Curtis Stigers, One More for the Road (Concord Jazz, 2017)
- James Taylor, In the Hand of the Inevitable (Acid Jazz, 1995)
- Diane Tell, Desir Plaisir Soupir (Sony, 1996)
- Joe Temperley, Concerto for Joe (Hep, 1995)
- Colin Towns, Nowhere & Heaven (Provocateur, 1996)
- Colin Towns, Dreaming Man with Blue Suede Shoes (Provocateur, 1999)
- Bonnie Tyler, Silhouette in Red (Hansa, 1993)
- Us3, Hand On the Torch (Blue Note, 1993)
- Us3, I Got It Goin' On (Capitol, 1993)
- Don Weller, Live (33 Records, 1997)
- Astrid Williamson, Boy for You (Nude, 1998)
- Workshy, Soul Love (Canyon, 1994)
- Zero 7, When It Falls (Ultimate Dilemma, 2004)
