= At the Black Hawk 5 =

Live album by Shelly Manne & His Men
- Released: 1991
- Recorded: September 23 & 24, 1959
- Venue: The Black Hawk in San Francisco, California
- Genre: Jazz
- Length: 54:11
- Label: Contemporary Original Jazz Classics OJCCD-660-2
- Producer: Lester Koenig

Shelly Manne chronology
At the Black Hawk 4 (1959)	At the Black Hawk 5 (1991)	The Proper Time (1960)

At the Black Hawk 5 is a live album by drummer Shelly Manne's group Shelly Manne & His Men, recorded at the Black Hawk in San Francisco, California, in 1959 and released on the Contemporary label in 1991. The album followed four volumes originally released in 1960 and features unreleased recordings from the Black Hawk sessions.

== Reception ==
Professional ratings
Review scores
Source	Rating
AllMusic	4/5 stars

The AllMusic review by Scott Yanow states: "the final CD of the extensive documentation of the Shelly Manne Quintet's stint at the Black Hawk club consists entirely of previously unreleased material. The performances by trumpeter Joe Gordon, tenor saxophonist Richie Kamuca, pianist Russ Freeman [sic], bassist Monty Budwig, and the drummer/leader are the same high level as on the more familiar material".

== Track listing ==
1. "How Deep Are the Roots" (Horace Silver) - 11:12
2. "This Is Always" (Mack Gordon, Harry Warren) - 10:13
3. "Wonder Why" (Nicholas Brodszky, Sammy Cahn) - 8:56
4. "Eclipse of Spain" (Victor Feldman) - 10:41
5. "Pullin' Strings" (Feldman) - 4:43
6. "Theme: A Gem from Tiffany" (Bill Holman) - 5:48
- Recorded at the Black Hawk, San Francisco on September 23 (tracks 1–3) and September 24 (tracks 5 & 6), 1959.

== Personnel ==
- Shelly Manne - drums
- Joe Gordon - trumpet
- Richie Kamuca - tenor saxophone
- Victor Feldman - piano
- Monty Budwig - bass
