= At the Jazz Corner of the World =

Live album by Art Blakey and the Jazz Messengers
- Released: September/October 1959
- Recorded: April 15, 1959
- Venue: Birdland, NYC
- Genre: Jazz
- Length: 78:03
- Label: Blue Note; BLP 4015 (Vol. 1); BLP 4016 (Vol. 2)
- Producer: Alfred Lion

Art Blakey and the Jazz Messengers chronology
Art Blakey et les Jazz-Messengers au club St. Germain (1958)	At the Jazz Corner of the World (1959)	Les Liaisons Dangereuses 1960 (1959)

At the Jazz Corner of the World, Vols. 1 & 2 are a pair of separate but related live albums by Art Blakey and the Jazz Messengers, recorded at the Birdland jazz club in New York City on April 15, 1959 and released on Blue Note later that year in September and October respectively. The quintet features horn section Lee Morgan and Hank Mobley and rhythm section Bobby Timmons, Jymie Merritt and Art Blakey.

== Background ==
=== Recording ===
The performance features four songs that had also been recorded in-studio just five weeks earlier for Just Coolin’, an album that was subsequently shelved in favor of releasing At the Jazz Corner of the World. Just Coolin’ remained unreleased until July 2020, when it was put out by Blue Note as part of an extended celebration of Blakey’s Centennial.

=== Release history ===
The album was originally issued on 12-inch LPs in two volumes (BLP 4015 and 4016) and later re-released as a two-CD double album.

== Reception ==
Professional ratings
Review scores
Source	Rating
AllMusic	4.5/5 stars
DownBeat	2/5 stars
The Penguin Guide to Jazz Recordings	3/4 stars

The AllMusic review by Michael G. Nastos states, "This band was as definitive a modern jazz ensemble as there ever was, and the immaculately chosen repertoire elevates this to one of the greatest live jazz sessions ever, and belongs on the shelf of all serious jazz listeners."

== Track listing ==
=== At the Jazz Corner of the World, Volume 1 ===
Side 1
No.	Title	Writer(s)	Length
1.	"Hipsippy Blues"	Hank Mobley	9:26
2.	"Justice"	Thelonious Monk	7:37
3.	"The Theme"	Traditional	2:18

Side 2
No.	Title	Writer(s)	Length
1.	"Close Your Eyes"	Bernice Petkere	10:58
2.	"Just Coolin'"	Mobley	8:11

=== At the Jazz Corner of the World, Volume 2 ===
Side 1
No.	Title	Writer(s)	Length
1.	"Chicken an' Dumplins"	Ray Bryant	7:26
2.	"M & M"	Mobley	6:41
3.	"Hi-Fly"	Randy Weston	8:00

Side 2
No.	Title	Writer(s)	Length
1.	"The Theme"	Traditional	9:13
2.	"Art's Revelation"	Gildo Mahones	8:13

- announced by Pee Wee Marquette

== Personnel ==
=== Art Blakey and the Jazz Messengers ===
- Lee Morgan – trumpet
- Hank Mobley – tenor saxophone
- Bobby Timmons – piano
- Jymie Merritt – bass
- Art Blakey – drums

=== Technical personnel ===
- Alfred Lion – producer
- Rudy Van Gelder – recording engineer
- Reid Miles – cover design
- Francis Wolff – photography
- Leonard Feather – liner notes
