= 1958 – Paris Olympia =

Olympia Concert
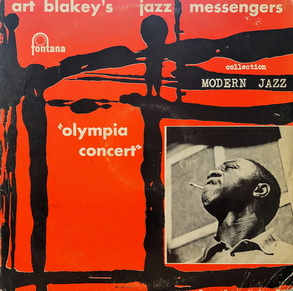

Live album by Art Blakey's Jazz Messengers
- Released: 1959
- Recorded: November 22 and December 17, 1958
- Venue: L'Olympia, Paris, France
- Genre: Jazz
- Length: 56:20
- Label: Fontana (France); 680 202 ML

Art Blakey chronology
Holiday for Skins (1958)	Olympia Concert (1959)	Des Femmes Disparaissent (1958)

The Jazz Messengers chronology
Moanin' (1958)	1958 – Paris Olympia (1958)	Des Femmes Disparaissent (1958)

European 1987 CD cover

1958 – Paris Olympia is a live album by drummer Art Blakey's Jazz Messengers recorded at the Olympia in late 1958 and originally released in 1959 on the French Fontana label as Olympia Concert. Soon reissued versions had several different covers and were also released titled Soul! (1965). In the US it was first issued on Epic in 1960 under the title Paris Concert. Behind the Iron Curtain the album was issued on the East German label Amiga in 1976 titled simply Art Blakey and His Jazz-Messengers. The first digital release on CD in 1987 added two tunes from the same two concert dates, that were originally issued by Fontana on a 7" single (460 642 TE), "Blues March" and "Whisper Not".

== Reception ==
Professional ratings
Review scores
Source	Rating
Allmusic	3/5 stars
DownBeat	3.5/5 stars
The Penguin Guide to Jazz Recordings	3/4 stars

Scott Yanow of Allmusic called it "Hard bop at its best, all of it propelled by the powerful drumming of Art Blakey".

== Track listing ==
All compositions by Benny Golson except where indicated.

1. "Just by Myself" – 4:35
2. "I Remember Clifford" – 5:36
3. "Are You Real" – 10:17
4. "Moanin'" (Bobby Timmons) – 13:38
5. "Justice" (Thelonious Monk) – 9:17
6. "Blues March" – 5:46
7. "Whisper Not" – 7:11

== Personnel ==
- Art Blakey – drums
- Lee Morgan – trumpet
- Benny Golson – tenor saxophone
- Bobby Timmons – piano
- Jymie Merritt – bass
