= Annette Stroyberg =

Danish actress (1936–2005)

Annette Strøyberg
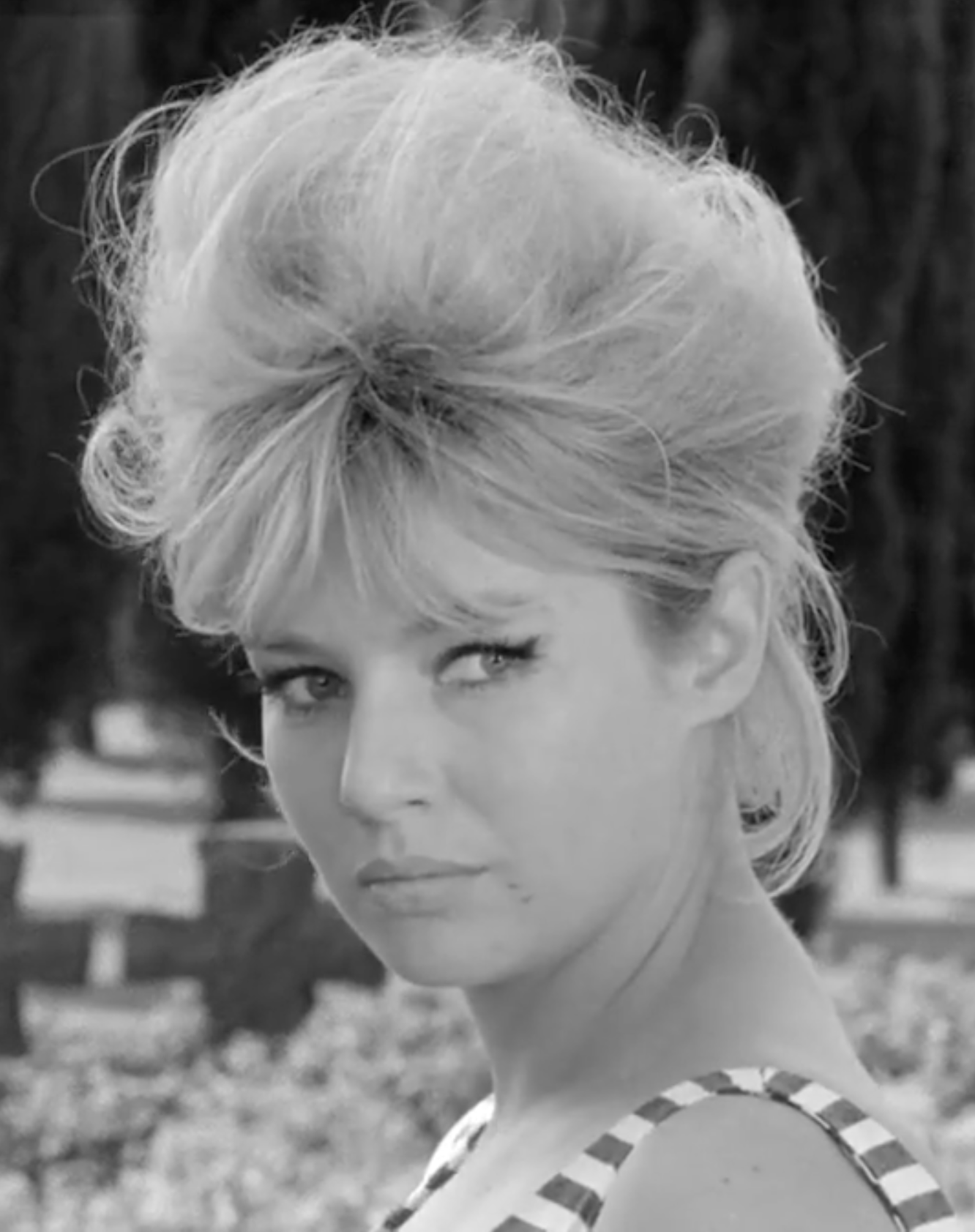
- Strøyberg in Il Sorpasso (1962)
- Born: Annette Susanne Strøyberg; 7 December 1936; Rynkeby, Kerteminde Municipality, Denmark
- Died: 12 December 2005 (aged 69); Copenhagen, Denmark
- Occupation: Actress
- Years active: 1959–1965
- Spouses: Roger Vadim (m. 1958; div. 1961) Guy Senouf (m. 1967; div. 1970) Gregory Callimanopulos (m. 1974; div. 1992) Christian Lillelund (m. 2001–2005)
- Partner: Vittorio Gassman (former)

Annette Susanne Strøyberg (7 December 1936 – 12 December 2005) was a Danish actress. Her films included Les Liaisons dangereuses (1959), which was directed by her first husband, Roger Vadim.

== Biography ==
Annette Strøyberg was born on 7 December 1936 in the village of Rynkeby, Kerteminde Municipality, Denmark, and is related to Danish actress Camilla Søeberg as the cousin of Camilla's mother. Prior to 1958, Strøyberg appeared as a cover girl, most notably in an advertisement for Tuborg beer. In 1959, she appeared in the film Les Liaisons dangereuses, directed by then-husband Roger Vadim, starring Gérard Philipe and Jeanne Moreau. She and Vadim had one daughter, Nathalie, born out of wedlock on 7 December 1957, just one day after his divorce from Brigitte Bardot was finalized. The couple were married from 1958 to 1961.

Strøyberg lived with Vittorio Gassman for a couple of years, and had liaisons with Alain Delon, Omar Sharif and Warren Beatty. In 1967, Strøyberg married French-Moroccan Guy Senouf. The couple enrolled at the Sorbonne and divided their time between Paris and north Africa. In 1974, she married Greek shipping magnate Gregory Callimanopulos in New York City.

In February 1986, former husband Vadim published Bardot, Deneuve, Fonda -- My Life With the Three Most Beautiful Women in the World, a book about Vadim's relationships in which Strøyberg is written as passing "in and out of the other four lives" such that there is at least as much in the book about Strøyberg as the three women named in the book title. After the break-up of her relationship with Callimanopulos in the early 1990s, she returned to Europe, living in Paris and Copenhagen, where she was part of the circle around Margrethe II of Denmark and Prince Henrik. She married a fourth and final time to Christian Lillelund, an attorney, in 2001.

== Death ==
She died of cancer in Copenhagen, Denmark, on 12 December 2005, five days after her 69th birthday. She was survived by her husband and three children.

== Selected filmography ==
- Les Liaisons dangereuses (1959)
- Testament of Orpheus (1960)
- Blood and Roses (1960)
- Trapped By Fear (1960)
- I Don Giovanni della Costa Azzurra (1962)
- The Easy Life (1962)
- Black Soul (1962)
- Il carabiniere a cavallo (1962)
- Lo scippo (1963)
- The Eye of the Needle (1963)
