= Black Hawk (nightclub) =

Former jazz nightclub in San Francisco, California

- Interactive map of Black Hawk
- Location: 200 Hyde Street; San Francisco, California, United States
- Coordinates: 37.7828°N 122.4154°W
- Owner: Guido Cacianti; Johnny and Helen Noga
- Capacity: 200
- Type: Nightclub
- Events: Jazz, Bebop

Construction
- Opened: 1949
- Closed: 1963

The Black Hawk was a San Francisco nightclub that featured live jazz performances during its period of operation from 1949 to 1963. It was located on the corner of Turk Street and Hyde Street in San Francisco's Tenderloin District. Guido Cacianti owned the club along with Johnny and Helen Noga.

== History ==
The Black Hawk's intimate atmosphere was ideal for small jazz groups and the club was a very popular hangout. In 1959, the fees that the club was able to pay jazz acts rose from less than $300 to more than $3,000 a week.

A "cage" area separated by woven wire fencing was provided for patrons under 21 years old who could not legally consume alcohol. This exception to the liquor laws was set up by an agreement between Black Hawk owner Guidio Cacianti and Mayor George Christopher, and made it possible for children to experience jazz.

A number of musicians recorded albums at the club, including Miles Davis, Cal Tjader, Thelonious Monk, Shelly Manne and Mongo Santamaría.

Other notable musicians who appeared there include the Dave Brubeck Quartet, John Coltrane, Dizzy Gillespie, Chet Baker, Vince Guaraldi, Stan Getz, Mary Stallings, Johnny Mathis, Art Blakey, Shorty Rogers, Art Pepper, Art Farmer, Gerry Mulligan, Horace Parlan and Russ Freeman. Art Tatum mainly did concert work in the last 18 months of his life; he played the Black Hawk in 1955.

Sunday afternoon sessions at the Black Hawk offered blowing time to young musicians. After a young sextet working at the Black Hawk brought Johnny Mathis in for a Sunday afternoon session, Helen Noga, co-owner of the club, decided that she wanted to manage his career. In early September 1955, Mathis gained a job singing at weekends for Ann Dee's 440 Club. After repeated attempts, Noga convinced George Avakian, then head of Popular Music A&R at Columbia, to see him. Avakian came to the club, heard Mathis sing and sent the now famous telegram to his record company: "Have found phenomenal 19-year-old boy who could go all the way."

Billie Holiday and Lester Young played their last West Coast club dates here and the Modern Jazz Quartet played its first. When Charlie Parker was supposed to be opening across town at Gordon "Dutch" Nieman's Say When Club at 952 Bush Street, near Powell, he could be found instead jamming at the Black Hawk. For several months each year, Brubeck, who got his real start at the Black Hawk, returned for extended series of appearances with his quartet, playing for consecutive weekends, sometimes for three months at a time.

Oakland-based guitarist and guitar builder Nick Esposito, known for his 1940's recordings with Barney Bigard including "Empty Ballroom Blues", "Penny", and "Back Fat Boogie," appeared many times at the Black Hawk during the 1950s.

The Blackhawk was closed in 1963. After housing a number of clubs including the "Top Drawer," the building was finally demolished, and is now a parking lot. Still standing adjacent to the site, however, is the "222 Club" (also known as "The Three Deuces"), a former green room to the Blackhawk where equipment was stored for live recordings. For his 1962 performance, Cal Tjader wrote a tune entitled "222 Time" as a nod to the Blackhawk's longtime neighbor.

== Selected discography ==
Year	Title	Artist	Genre	Label	Recorded
1956	Jazz at the Black Hawk	Dave Brubeck	Jazz	Fantasy	1956
1957	Jazz at the Blackhawk	Cal Tjader	Jazz	Fantasy	January 20, 1957
1958	Cal Tjader's Latin Concert	Cal Tjader	Jazz	Fantasy	September 1958
1958	A Night at the Blackhawk (Live)	Cal Tjader	Jazz	Fantasy	December 1958
1959	At the Black Hawk 1	Shelly Manne	Jazz	Contemporary	September 22–24, 1959
1959	At the Black Hawk 2	Shelly Manne	Jazz	Contemporary	September 22–24, 1959
1959	At the Black Hawk 3	Shelly Manne	Jazz	Contemporary	September 22–24, 1959
1959	At the Black Hawk 4	Shelly Manne	Jazz	Contemporary	September 22–24, 1959
1959	At the Black Hawk 5	Shelly Manne	Jazz	Contemporary	September 23 & 24, 1959
1960	Thelonious Monk Quartet Plus Two at the Blackhawk	Thelonious Monk	Jazz	Riverside	April 1960
1960	Live and Direct	Cal Tjader	Jazz	Fantasy	September 1960
1961	In Person Friday Night At The Blackhawk, Complete, Volume I	Miles Davis	Jazz	Columbia	April 21, 1961
1961	In Person Saturday Night At The Blackhawk, Complete, Volume II	Miles Davis	Jazz	Columbia	April 22, 1961
1962	¡Viva Mongo!	Mongo Santamaría	Latin Jazz	Fantasy	1962
1962	Mighty Mongo	Mongo Santamaría	Latin Jazz	Fantasy	1962
1962	Ahmad Jamal at the Blackhawk	Ahmad Jamal	Jazz	Argo	1962
1962	Saturday Night/Sunday Night at the Blackhawk	Cal Tjader	Jazz	Verve	January 27–28, 1962

== See also ==
- List of jazz clubs
- West Coast jazz
