= Cantaloop (Flip Fantasia) =

1992 single by Us3

Single by Us3

from the album Hand On the Torch
- Released: October 1992
- Genre: Jazz rap; acid jazz
- Length: 3:42 (single version); 4:41 (album version)
- Label: Blue Note
- Songwriters: Herbie Hancock; Rahsaan Kelly; Geoff Wilkinson; Mel Simpson
- Producers: Geoff Wilkinson; Mel Simpson

Us3 singles chronology
"Cantaloop (Flip Fantasia)" (1992)	"Tukka Yoot's Riddim" (1993)

Music video
- "Cantaloop (Flip Fantasia)" on YouTube

"Cantaloop (Flip Fantasia)" is a song by British jazz-rap group Us3, originally released in October 1992 by Blue Note Records as the lead single from the group's debut album, Hand On the Torch (1993). The song was recorded as a demo a year before the group's first release and features a sample of Herbie Hancock's song "Cantaloupe Island". "Cantaloop (Flip Fantasia)" did not chart in the group's native UK, but in the US, it reached No. 9 and 7 on the Billboard Hot 100 and Cash Box Top 100, becoming the group's only top 40 single. It was subsequently re-released in UK where it peaked at No. 23. Its accompanying music video was directed by Charles Wittenmeier and won an award at the 1994 Billboard Music Video Awards. The song was certified gold by the Recording Industry Association of America (RIAA) on 25 March 1994 for selling over 500,000 copies.

== Composition ==
"Cantaloop (Flip Fantasia)" is based on American jazz musician Herbie Hancock's "Cantaloupe Island" from 1964 and features samples from Hancock's original Blue Note recording of that composition. Another sample, the announcement by Pee Wee Marquette, is taken from the Blue Note album A Night at Birdland, Vol. 1 by The Art Blakey Quintet from 1954.

== Critical reception ==
Ron Wynn from AllMusic stated that "when words and music mesh", as on "Cantaloop (Flip Fantasia)", "Us3 show how effectively hip-hop and jazz can blend." Another AllMusic editor, Stewart Mason, complimented it as "excellent" and "probably the best acid jazz single ever". Larry Flick from Billboard magazine said, "Tired of the same old urban grind? Here's just what you need: a zesty stew of traditional jazz-fusion, hip-hop, and classic funk. Live horns (with a trumpet solo that works!), imaginative use of samples from Herbie Hancock's 'Cantaloop [sic] Island', and diggy-diggy-bop rapping render this an essential playlist addition." The Daily Vault's Christopher Thelen noted its "trip-hop mood". David Hajdu from Entertainment Weekly named it "one of the best singles of the year". Linda Ryan from the Gavin Report commented, "It just doesn't get cooler than this! US3 combine jazz, hip-hop and house grooves for a fresh sound that begs to be discovered in a big way. If you thought Guru's Jazzmatazz was phat and all that, wait 'til you hear US3's 'Cantaloop!' I prefer either the Radio Edit or the Groovy Mix. Aw, yeah."

The Irish Independent deemed it "excellent". Calvin Bush from Melody Maker called it "exultant". Another Melody Maker music critic, Peter Paphides, felt "this new colourful little number is piquant yet sweet, adventurous yet convivial, brusque yet somehow inviting." Alan Jones from Music Week named it Pick of the Week, praising it as a "superb" rap and "funky, spunky, tasty, sample-strewn and cool jazz jam". The magazine's Andy Beevers gave it a score of four out of five, noting that the song "is even more catchy than 'Tukka Yoot's Riddim'. Rahsaan is the rapper this time and the vibe is funky rather than ragga influenced." Neil Spencer from The Observer considered it the "standout" of the album. Dimitri Ehrlich from Rolling Stone found that "Cantaloop" "is as easily digested as the fruit it's named after." Adam Higginbotham from Select named it a "outstanding effort" and "infectious". Charles Aaron from Spin wrote, "When this gem popped out of the sound system at Madison Square Garden (Knicks 98, Clippers 77, January 11, 1994), even Woody Allen quit slouching. For the 20-second time-out, I could envision a jazz orchestra doing hip-hop repertory in a racially mixed midtown disco. And it was a really good idea." Troy J. Augusto from Variety described it as "a smooth, midtempo jazz track" that heavily samples the Herbie Hancock track.

== Music video ==
A music video was produced to promote the single, directed by Charles Wittenmeier. It was originally serviced to outlets in November 1992, but was put on rotation on these after Capitol re-serviced the clip in October 1993. The clip got exposure in MTV's "buzz bin" and on its "Alternative Nation", "Yo! MTV Raps", and "MTV Jams" programs. Also BET, VH-1's "Soul of VH-1" program, and The Box put it on rotation. VH-1 rarely programmed rap at the time, but the video proved the exception. VH-1's director of music programming, Lois Ruben, told, "The jazz element really makes it appealing to the adult audience. There's a lot of heavy instrumentation in there. It's a great-looking video, too, which helps. It's alternative and mainstream at the same time." "Cantaloop (Flip Fantasia)" earned an award in the category for Best New Artist Dance Clip at the 1994 Billboard Music Video Awards in Los Angeles, where it had been nominated also for Best Dance Clip of the Year and Maximum Impact Clip of the Year. The video was later made available on YouTube's Vevo channel in 2009, and had generated more than 15 million views as of early 2025.

== Impact and legacy ==
"Cantaloop (Flip Fantasia)" was awarded one of ASCAP's Rhythm & Soul Awards in 1995.

American online publication Slant Magazine listed the song at number 76 in their ranking of "The 100 Best Singles of the 1990s" in 2011, writing, "They got the beats. They got the rhymes. Us3's sole pop hit, 'Cantaloop (Flip Fantasia)', is a cheerfully funky fusion of jazz and hip-hop—nothing more, nothing less. What it lacks in social consciousness it makes up for in musical brinkmanship: The production's exciting explosion of frenetic horn riffs, interrupted only by a sick trumpet solo by Gerard Presencer, samples Herbie Hancock and Lou Donaldson, among others, and grooves in scary synchronicity with the uncannily delivered lyrics by one-time member Rahsaan Kelly. The mood is creative, idealistic, and laidback, suggesting the good vibes of A Tribe Called Quest and Digable Planets. It's a sweet, slick, funky maelstrom of sound that's also a time capsule of a gorgeously short-lived musical form. Diddi-diddi bop."

== Charts ==
=== Weekly charts ===
Chart (1992)	Peak position
UK Airplay (Music Week)	45
UK Club Chart (Music Week)	67

Chart (1993–1994)	Peak position
Australia (ARIA)	32
Austria (Ö3 Austria Top 40)	3
Belgium (Ultratop 50 Flanders)	24
Canada Top Singles (RPM)	24
Canada Dance/Urban (RPM)	5
Europe (Eurochart Hot 100)	31
Europe (European Dance Radio)	16
France (SNEP)	55
Germany (GfK)	22
Greece (Pop + Rock)	2
Iceland (Íslenski Listinn Topp 40)	23
Netherlands (Dutch Top 40)	17
Netherlands (Single Top 100)	18
New Zealand (Recorded Music NZ)	16
Switzerland (Schweizer Hitparade)	7
UK Singles (Official Charts)	23
UK Airplay (ERA)	41
UK Dance (Music Week)	8
UK Club Chart (Music Week)	49
US Billboard Hot 100	9
US Hot R&B Singles (Billboard)	21
US Maxi-Singles Sales (Billboard)	14
US Modern Rock Tracks (Billboard)	29
US Cash Box Top 100	7

=== Year-end charts ===
Chart (1993)	Position
Austria (Ö3 Austria Top 40)	26
Europe (Eurochart Hot 100)	86
Germany (Media Control)	48
Switzerland (Schweizer Hitparade)	24

Chart (1994)	Position
Brazil (Crowley)	31
US Billboard Hot 100	41
US Cash Box Top 100	42

== Appearances in other media ==
"Cantaloop (Flip Fantasia)" is played in the films Super Mario Bros. (1993), Jimmy Hollywood (1994), Renaissance Man (1994), It Takes Two (1995), Sisters (2015), and The Incredible Burt Wonderstone (2013), and in the TV shows New York Undercover, Hindsight, the Baywatch episode "Someone to Baywatch Over You" (1994) and the Australian news satire Frontline. It is also featured in the PlayStation 4 video game Knack II (2017), during the end credits showing Knack in his various sizes dancing to the song, and was used as the theme song for The Connection radio program on WBUR. In 2024, the song was used as background music in U.S. TV commercials for Johnsonville Sausage's "Keep It Juicy" campaign.
