= Leslie Gourse =

American novelist (1939–2004)

- in 1996
- Born: January 1, 1939; Fall River, Massachusetts, U.S.
- Died: December 23, 2004 (aged 65); New York City, U.S.
- Education: Columbia University
- Occupations: Writer; biographer
- Parent(s): Harva Zelda Fisher Gourse; Harry Andrew Gourse

Roberta Leslie Gourse (January 1, 1939 – December 23, 2004) was an American writer and biographer who was a prolific writer on jazz music and musicians. In 1991, the American Society of Composers, Authors and Publishers awarded her the Deems Taylor Award for a series of seven articles in the magazine JazzTimes focusing on female jazz musicians.

Gourse was born in Fall River, Massachusetts, to Harva Zelda Fisher Gourse and Harry Andrew Gourse. She attended Columbia University. Shortly after her graduation in 1960, Gourse published her first novel, With Gall and Honey, a romantic novel set in Israel. Gourse wrote several books for children, and many biographies of notable jazz musicians.

Gourse died as a result of respiratory problems in 2004.

== Bibliography ==
- The Best Guided Walking Tours to New York City, (1989)
- Student Guide to New York (1984)
- Pocahontas: Young Peacemaker (1996, for children)
- Gloria Estefan: Pop Sensation (1999)
- Native American Courtship and Marriage
- Jim Henson: Young Puppeteer (2000)

On Jazz

- Madame Jazz: Contemporary Women Instrumentalists (1995)
- Louis' Children – American Jazz Singers (1984)
- Straight No Chaser: The Life and Genius of Thelonious Monk (1998)
- Wynton Marsalis: Skain's Domain (2000)
- Sassy – The Life of Sarah Vaughan (1992)
- Carmen McRae – Miss Jazz (2001)
- Dizzy Gillespie and the Birth of Bebop (1995)
- Art Blakey – Jazz Messenger (2001)
- Aretha Franklin – Lady Soul
- Unforgettable – Life and Mystique of Nat King Cole (2000)
- Everyday: The Story of Joe Williams (1985)
- Billie Holiday: The Tragedy and Triumph of Lady Day (1995)
- The Billie Holiday Companion (1997)
- Lady Be Good (1995)
- Mahalia Jackson: Queen of Gospel Songs (1996)
- The Golden Age of Jazz in Paris and other stories about Jazz (2001)

Books on jazz for children and young people

- Sophisticated Ladies – The Great Women of Jazz (2007)
- Striders of Bebop and Beyond- The Art of Jazz Piano (1997)
- Blowing on the Changes- The Art of Jazz Horn Players (1998)
- Deep Down in Music: The Art of the Great Jazz Bassists (1998) (with a foreword by Ron Carter)
- Fancy Fretwork- The Great Jazz Guitarists
- Swingers and Crooners- The Art of Jazz Singing (1997)
- Time Keepers – The Great Jazz Drummers (2000)
