= Il carabiniere a cavallo =

1962 film

- Directed by: Carlo Lizzani
- Written by: Ruggero Maccari; Ettore Scola; Antonio Pietrangeli
- Starring: Nino Manfredi; Peppino De Filippo
- Cinematography: Gianni Di Venanzo
- Edited by: Franco Fraticelli
- Music by: Carlo Rustichelli
- Release date: 1962
- Running time: 95 minutes
- Country: Italy
- Language: Italian

Il carabiniere a cavallo ('The mounted carabiniere') is a 1962 Italian comedy film directed by Carlo Lizzani.

== Plot ==
In Rome, a mounted carabiniere is set to marry his fiancée Letizia, yet he must keep the wedding a secret due to the regulations mandating an immediate transfer upon marriage. However, complications arise when a couple of nomadic women steal his horse, Rutilio. Amidst the chaos, the officer, accompanied by his friend Brigadier Tarquinio, navigates through various challenges to resolve the situation and recover his horse before the day's end.

== Cast ==
- Nino Manfredi as Franco Bartolomucci
- Peppino De Filippo as Brigadiere Tarquinio
- Annette Stroyberg as Letizia, Franco's fianceè
- Maurizio Arena as Renato
- Clelia Matania as Letizia's mother
- Eubenio Maggi as Letizia's father
- Anthea Nocera as Rita
- Guido Celano as Rita's father
- Silvio Anselmo as Lazzaro
- Aldo Giuffrè as training lieutenant
- Luciano Salce as the priest
- Lamberto Antinori as the barber
- Renato Chiantoni as Chiantini
- Franco Pesce as best man at the wedding
- Fanfulla

== Production ==
Principal cinematography started in Rome on December 1960. The film had the working title Il carabiniere. Ettore Scola served as assistant director. Before its release, originally scheduled for the first half of 1961, the film was rejected three times by the Italian censorship, who requested a change of title and over 7 minutes to be cut.

== Release ==
The film was released on 29 July 1962 and grossed 380 million lire at the Italian box office.
