= Cantaloupe Island =

1964 song by Herbie Hancock

Song by Herbie Hancock

from the album Empyrean Isles
- Released: November 1964
- Recorded: June 17, 1964
- Studio: Van Gelder Studio, Englewood Cliffs, New Jersey
- Genre: Modal jazz
- Length: 5:33
- Label: Blue Note
- Songwriter: Herbie Hancock

Music video
- Cantaloupe Island (Remastered) 1999 on YouTube

"Cantaloupe Island" is a jazz standard composed by Herbie Hancock and recorded for his 1964 album Empyrean Isles during his early years as one of the members of Miles Davis' 1960s quintet. Hancock later recorded a version mixing reggae and jazz fusion of the track, as Cantelope Island, on his 1976 album Secrets. The track is featured in the Woody Allen's film Coup de chance released in 2023. The soundtrack of the 1994 computer game Transport Tycoon includes parts of "Cantaloupe Island".

== Musicians ==
The musicians for the original 1964 recording were Hancock (piano), Freddie Hubbard (cornet), Ron Carter (bass) and Tony Williams (drums). The 1976 recording featured Bennie Maupin (saxophone), Wah Wah Watson (guitar), Paul Jackson (bass), and James Levi (drums).

== Samples ==
The jazz rap group Us3 sampled "Cantaloupe Island" in their song "Cantaloop (Flip Fantasia)", from their album Hand On the Torch (1993). "Cantaloop (Flip Fantasia)" was recorded as a demo a year before the group's first release. In the US, "Cantaloop (Flip Fantasia)" reached No. 21 on the R&B Single Sales chart No. 9 on the Billboard Hot 100, becoming the group's only top 40 single. It did not chart initially in their native UK, but after its US success, it was subsequently re-released in UK where it peaked at No. 23. "Cantaloop" was certified gold by the Recording Industry Association of America (RIAA) on March 25, 1994, for selling over 500,000 copies.

== Awards ==
In 2000, "Cantaloupe Island" placed at #19 in the Jazz24.org "Jazz 100: One Hundred Quintessential Jazz Songs".
