= Holiday for Skins =

- Volume 1 (BLP 4004)

Studio album by Art Blakey
- Released: Early June 1959
- Recorded: November 9, 1958
- Studio: Manhattan Towers, NYC
- Genre: Jazz
- Length: 33:58 (Vol. 1); 33:16 (Vol. 2); 67:14 (CD)
- Label: Blue Note; BLP 4004 (Vol. 1); BLP 4005 (Vol. 2)
- Producer: Alfred Lion

Art Blakey chronology
Drums Around the Corner (1958)	Holiday for Skins (1959)	1958 - Paris Olympia (1958)

Holiday for Skins
- Volume 2 (BLP 4005)

Professional ratings
Review scores
Source	Rating
AllMusic	3.5/5 stars
The Penguin Guide to Jazz Recordings	3/4 stars

Holiday for Skins, Volumes 1 & 2 are a pair of separate but related albums by American jazz drummer Art Blakey, recorded on November 9, 1958 and released on Blue Note the following year.

== Release history ==
They were reissued together on a single CD in 2006.

== Track listing ==
=== Holiday for Skins, Volumes One ===
All tracks are written by Art Blakey.

Side 1
No.	Title	Length
1.	"The Feast"	8:52
2.	"Aghano"	6:03

Side 2
No.	Title	Length
1.	"Lamento Africano"	8:22
2.	"Mirage"	10:27

=== Holiday for Skins, Volumes Two ===
All tracks are written by Art Blakey except as noted.

Side 1
No.	Title	Writer(s)	Length
1.	"O'Tinde"		6:14
2.	"Swingin' Kilts"	Ray Bryant	8:48

Side 2
No.	Title	Writer(s)	Length
1.	"Dinga"		8:57
2.	"Reflection"	Bryant	9:06

=== 2006 CD reissue ===
All tracks are written by Art Blakey.

No.	Title	Writer(s)	Length
1.	"Aghano"		6:07
2.	"The Feast"		8:56
3.	"Mirage"		10:30
4.	"Lamento Africano"		8:25
5.	"O'Tinde"		6:17
6.	"Swingin' Kilts"	Ray Bryant	8:53
7.	"Dinga"		9:00
8.	"Reflection"	Bryant	9:06

== Personnel ==
=== Musicians ===
- Art Blakey – drums, chants
- Philly Joe Jones – drums, timpani, chants
- Art Taylor – drums, gong
- Sabu Martinez – bongos, congas, chants
- Ray Barretto, Chonguito Vincente – congas
- Victor Gonzales – bongos
- Andy Delannoy – maracas, cencerro
- Julio Martinez – congas, tree log
- Fred Pagani, Jr. – timbales
- Donald Byrd – trumpet
- Ray Bryant – piano
- Wendell Marshall – bass
- Austin Cromer, Hal Rasheed – chanting

=== Technical personnel ===
- Alfred Lion – producer
- Rudy Van Gelder – recording engineer, mastering
- Reid Miles – design
- Francis Wolff – photography
- Joe Goldberg – liner notes
