= An Ordinary Day in an Unusual Place =

Studio album by Us3
- Released: 15 May 2001
- Genre: Jazz, hip-hop
- Length: 1:15:53
- Label: Boutique/Universal Jazz
- Producer: J.C. Concato, Geoff Wilkinson

Us3 chronology
Flip Fantasia: Hits & Remixes (1999)	An Ordinary Day in an Unusual Place (2001)	Questions (2003)

An Ordinary Day in an Unusual Place is the third album by the jazz-rap group Us3, released in 2001. DJ First Rate, Michelob, and Alison Crokett contributed to the album. It was recorded in the home studio of Geoff Wilkinson.

The album's first single was "You Can't Hold Me Down". Us3 promoted the album by playing the 2001 London Jazz Festival.

== Critical reception ==
Professional ratings
Review scores
Source	Rating
The Encyclopedia of Popular Music	3/5 stars
The Sun-Herald	3/3 stars
The Sydney Morning Herald	3.5/5 stars
Times & Transcript	3/4 stars
The Weekend Australian	3.5/5 stars

The Weekend Australian called the album Us3's "most impressive outing yet, developing what began as a simple fusion of hip-hop, rap and jazz into a distinctively funky hybrid." The Sydney Morning Herald deemed it "another classy blend of jazz and beats ... intriguing yet accessible."

The Times & Transcript thought that "the tunes are mellow, with jazzy beats and jazzy bass and drums, but with rap style vocals and with the occasional instruments native to other countries, such as the sitar and the sundri." The Newcastle Herald stated: "Not a masterpiece but a strong album of brassy jazz grooves, mellow raps and sweet soul vocals."

== Tracks ==
1. "An Ordinary Day in an Unusual Place, Pt. 1"
2. "Get Out"
3. "You Can't Hold Me Down"
4. "Let My Dreams Come True"
5. "India"
6. "Sittin' on My Park Bench"
7. "Dead End Street"
8. "Enough"
9. "Enough [Bonus Beats]"
10. "World No More"
11. "Pay Attention"
12. "Sugar Sugar [She She Wah Wah]"
13. "Why?"
14. "You Know What We Got to Do"
15. "An Ordinary Day in an Unusual Place, Pt. 2"
16. "Internet"
17. "Modern Fuckin' Jazz"

== Personnel ==
- Neil Angilley – piano
- Beverly Brown – vocals, backing vocals
- Marie Harper – vocals
- Ed Jones – soprano saxophone, tenor saxophone
- Mika Mylläri – trumpet
- Gaurav Mazumdar – sitar
- Michelob – vocals
- Swati Natekar – vocals
- David O'Higgins – tenor saxophone
- Tony Remy – guitar
- Baluji Shrivastav – sitar
- Tim Vine – organ, Mellotron, Solina, Mini Moog, string ensemble
- Jim Watson – piano

== Charts ==
Chart performance for An Ordinary Day in an Unusual Place
Chart (2001)	Peak position
Finnish Albums (Suomen virallinen lista)	40
