= Lookin' Good! =

Studio album by Joe Gordon
- Released: October 30, 1961
- Recorded: July 11–12 & 18, 1961
- Studios: Contemporary Records Studios, Los Angeles, California
- Genre: Jazz
- Length: 40:36
- Labels: Contemporary; M 3597/S7597
- Producer: Lester Koenig

Joe Gordon chronology
Introducing Joe Gordon (1955)	Lookin' Good! (1961)

Lookin' Good! is the second and final album led by trumpeter Joe Gordon which was recorded in 1961 and released on the Contemporary label.

== Reception ==
Professional ratings
Review scores
Source	Rating
Allmusic	4.5/5 stars
The Penguin Guide to Jazz Recordings	3/4 stars

Allmusic awarded the album 4½ stars with its review by Scott Yanow stating: "Although the solos are generally more memorable than the tunes, this is an excellent effort that hints at what might have been had Joe Gordon lived".

== Track listing ==
All compositions by Joe Gordon

1. "Terra Firma Irma" - 7:46
2. "A Song for Richard" - 5:05
3. "Non-Viennese Waltz Blues" - 4:14
4. "You're the Only Girl in the Next World for Me" - 4:05
5. "Co-Op Blues" - 6:00
6. "Mariana" - 4:13
7. "Heleen" - 4:06
8. "Diminishing" - 5:07

== Personnel ==
- Joe Gordon - trumpet
- Jimmy Woods - alto saxophone
- Dick Whittington - piano
- Jimmy Bond - bass
- Milt Turner - drums
