= Pee Wee Marquette =

American musician (1914–1992)

- Born: October 10, 1914; Montgomery, Alabama, U.S.
- Died: September 21, 1992 (aged 77); New York, New York, U.S.
- Other names: William Crayton Marquette; Will Clayton Marquette; Billy J. Marquette
- Occupation: Entertainer
- Known for: Birdland jazz club

William Clayton "Pee Wee" Marquette (October 10, 1914 – September 21, 1992) was the former master of ceremonies at the Birdland jazz club in New York City. Born in Montgomery, Alabama, Marquette was the son of Willis and Kinnie Markett (or sometimes, Markette). Marquette was under four feet tall; some reports have stated three-and-a-half feet.

Marquette began his career with the Francis Craig Orchestra in Nashville, and was a part of that organization for ten years, both dancing and telling jokes. While in Nashville, Marquette lived in the home of Dr. Oliver L. Hambrick, an African American general practitioner. In 1936, "Willie (Pee Wee) Marquette" is listed as one of the performers in Nashville's spring musical, presented by the Friendship Interest Club, and held in the parlors of the Gardner Undertaking Company. In 1943, he moved to New York City "with $35 in his pocket". The owner of Club Zanzibar saw him walking by on the street, and offered him a job hosting; Marquette worked there off-and-on for five years, also hosting at Hank Armstrong's Melody Room. In 1949, he became host at the Birdland jazz club in Manhattan, remaining there until 1965. On July 25, 1955, Marquette and other Birdland regulars like Count Basie appeared at New York's Dunderberg Field for an exhibition baseball game.

He had a reputation for being mean and demanding "tips" to the point of extortion. An explanation of his system was given by vibraphonist Bobby Hutcherson in an interview. He claimed Marquette told him on his first day that he was not needed and that he should "pack your things and get on out of here." This did not occur as he had been asked to play, but Marquette made Hutcherson's first night playing at the club difficult. Marquette intentionally mispronounced his name to embarrass Hutcherson and blew cigar smoke in his face to further the irritation. However once Marquette was paid his "tip" he pronounced Hutcherson's name correctly. This is said to have been a pattern for him: other musicians had similar stories of having to pay him to avoid public humiliation. Perhaps because of this, or because of the era, most musicians who knew him still referred to him as a "midget".

He appeared on Late Night with David Letterman on February 6, 1985, during which he discussed his memories of being at the jazz club.

In 1988, Marquette filed a $2 million lawsuit against Warner Brothers in Manhattan Supreme Court, alleging that the Clint Eastwood film Bird portrayed him (via actor Tony Cox) in an unflattering and demeaning manner. "It's a shame what they did," he said. "There's only one of me and everyone knows me." During this time, Marquette was working as a greeter and doorman at the Hawaii Kai restaurant in Times Square.

Marquette died of pancreatic cancer in September 1992.

His voice can be heard making the introductions on the Art Blakey Quintet's 1954 recordings issued as A Night at Birdland. His announcements are also documented on Blakey's other Birdland albums At the Jazz Corner of the World (1959) and Ugetsu (1963). He can be heard in the introductory sequence and tail of "Birdland" on the Quincy Jones album Back on the Block (released in 1989) as well as the introduction on Us3's hit song, "Cantaloop (Flip Fantasia)."

The website All About Jazz published an article on April Fool's Day, 2008, supposedly reviewing a compact disc composed entirely of his emcee introductions, entitled Every Night at Birdland: The Lost Introductions.
