= A Night at Birdland Vol. 3 =

A Night at Birdland, Vol. 3

Live album by Art Blakey
- Released: June 21, 1984
- Recorded: February 21, 1954
- Studio: Birdland, New York City
- Genre: Jazz
- Length: 29:37
- Label: Toshiba (Japan)

A Night at Birdland, Vol. 3 is a 12″ live album containing outtakes from A Night at Birdland, Vols. 1–3, released in 1984 by Toshiba Records in Japan.

Three of the four tracks on the Japanese 12″ Vol. 3 had previously been released as part of a 2 LP Compilation entitled Live Messengers (BN-LA473-J2) in 1975.

All of the tracks from both Vol. 3's have subsequently been reissued on the CD versions of A Night at Birdland, Vols. 1 & 2.

== Track listing ==
Side 1
No.	Title	Music	Length
1.	"Wee-Dot (alternate take)"	J.J. Johnson, Leo Parker	6:53
2.	"Blues (Improvisation)"	Traditional	8:37

Side 2
No.	Title	Writer(s)	Length
1.	"The Way You Look Tonight"	Dorothy Fields; Jerome Kern	9:59
2.	"Lou's Blues" (previously unreleased)	Lou Donaldson	3:58

== Personnel ==
- Art Blakey – drums
- Clifford Brown – trumpet
- Lou Donaldson – alto saxophone
- Horace Silver – piano
- Curly Russell – bass
