= Introducing Joe Gordon =

Studio album by Joe Gordon
- Released: 1955
- Recorded: September 3 & 8, 1954; Fine Sound Studios, New York City
- Genre: Jazz
- Length: 41:11
- Label: EmArcy; MG 36025 (MG26046 for the 10-inch version)

Joe Gordon chronology
Introducing Joe Gordon (1955)	Lookin' Good! (1961)

Introducing Joe Gordon is the debut album by American jazz trumpeter Joe Gordon featuring tracks recorded in late 1954 and released on the EmArcy label.

== Reception ==
Professional ratings
Review scores
Source	Rating
Allmusic	4/5 stars

Allmusic awarded the album 4 stars stating "Most of the tunes are originals based on the chord changes of standards, and Gordon sounds in fine form in this swinging setting".

== Track listing ==
All compositions by Joe Gordon except as indicated

1. "Toll Bridge" - 6:30
2. "Lady Bob" (Quincy Jones) - 6:59
3. "Grasshopper" (Jones) - 6:59
4. "Flash Gordon" - 7:39
5. "Bous Bier" - 6:49
6. "Xochimilco" - 6:15
7. Evening Lights - 4:21
8. Body And Soul - 4:25
- Recorded at Fine Sound Studios in New York City on September 3 (tracks 3, 4 & 6) and September 8 (tracks 1, 2 & 5), 1954

== Personnel ==
- Joe Gordon - trumpet
- Charlie Rouse - tenor saxophone
- Junior Mance - piano
- Jimmy Schenck - bass
- Art Blakey - drums
