= Us3 =

British jazz rap band (1992–2025)

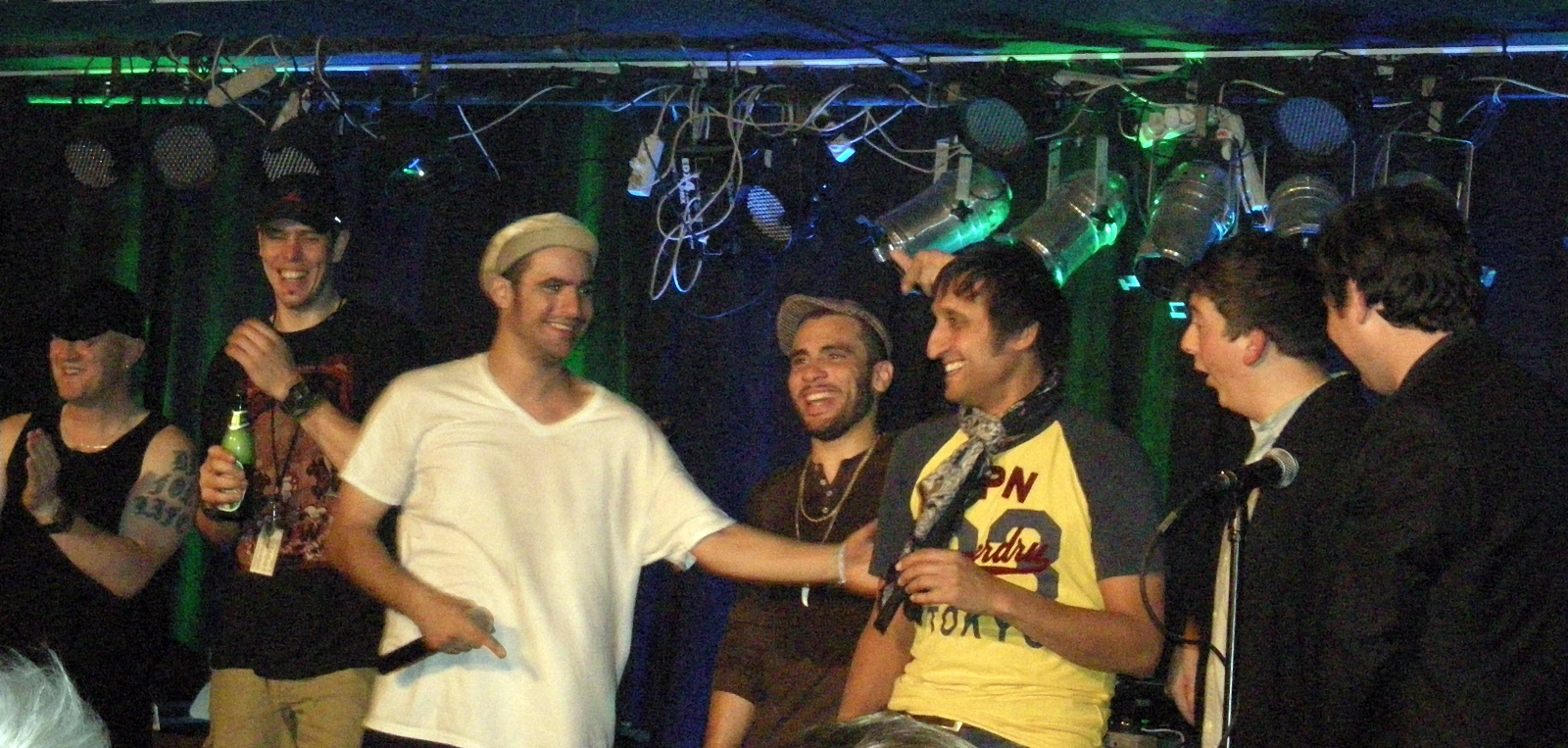
- Us3 in Poland in 2011

Background information
- Origin: London, England
- Years active: 1992–2025
- Labels: Blue Note; Us3
- Past members: Geoff Wilkinson; Mel Simpson (deceased); Rahsaan Kelly; Kobie Powell; Tukka Yoot; KCB; Shabaam Sahdeeq; Michelob; Alison Crockett; Reggi Wyns; Mpho Skeef; Akil Dasan; Gaston; Adeline; Brook Yung; Sene; Oveous Maximus; Akala
- Website: us3.com

Us3 is a British jazz rap group founded by London-based producer Geoff Wilkinson in 1992.

The name was inspired by Us Three, a Horace Parlan album produced in 1960 by Alfred Lion, the founder of Blue Note Records. Us3's debut album, Hand on the Torch, used samples from Blue Note songs produced by Lion.

== History ==
In the early 1990s, London-based producer Geoff Wilkinson produced two recordings under the name Us3. The first was 1990's "Where Will We Be in the 21st Century", a limited-edition white label 12" release. It drew the attention of independent label Ninja Tune, resulting in NW1's 1991 12-inch single "The Band Played The Boogie", featuring UK rapper Born 2 B.

Wilkinson established Us3 with production partner Mel Simpson. One of the resulting demos, recorded in March 1992, was "Cantaloop (Flip Fantasia)", featuring UK trumpeter Gerard Presencer. It sampled Herbie Hancock's "Cantaloupe Island". Us3 went on a hiatus in 2014, during which Wilkinson went on to specialise in producing film and library music.

In 2025, Us3 released Soundtrack, a studio album consisting of a cinematic mix of trap rhythms with big band orchestration, including tracks inspired by Gil Evans and Don Ellis.

== Discography ==
=== Albums ===
List of albums, with selected chart positions
Title	Year	Peak chart positions								
Title	Year	UK	AUS	AUT	GER	NLD	NZ	SWI	US	US R&B/HH
Hand on the Torch	1993	40	51	11	29	81	28	21	31	21
Broadway & 52nd	1997	93	90	28	80	91	39	48	—	90
An Ordinary Day in an Unusual Place	2001	—	—	—	—	—	—	—	—	—
Questions	2004	—	—	—	—	—	—	—	—	—
Schizophonic	2006	—	—	—	—	—	—	—	—	—
Say What!?	2007	—	—	—	—	—	—	—	—	—
Stop. Think. Run.	2009	—	—	—	—	—	—	—	—	—
Lie, Cheat & Steal	2011	—	—	—	—	—	—	—	—	—
The Third Way	2013	—	—	—	—	—	—	—	—	—
Soundtrack	2025	—	—	—	—	—	—	—	—	—
Snap, Crackle & Bop	2026									

=== Singles ===
List of singles, with selected chart positions
Title	Year	Peak positions										Album
Title	Year	UK	AUS	AUT	BEL (FL)	GER	NLD	NZ	SWI	US	US R&B	Album
"Cantaloop (Flip Fantasia)"	1992	76	32	3	24	22	18	16	7	9	21	Hand on the Torch
"Tukka Yoot's Riddim"	1993	34	221	24	—	97	—	28	26	—	—	Hand on the Torch
"Cantaloop (Flip Fantasia)" (UK reissue)	1993	23	—	—	—	—	—	—	—	—	—	Hand on the Torch
"I Got It Goin' On"	1994	52	189	—	—	—	—	39	—	—	—	Hand on the Torch
"Eleven Long Years"	1994	—	—	—	—	—	—	—	—	—	—	Hand on the Torch
"Come on Everybody (Get Down)"	1997	38	184	—	—	—	—	—	49	—	—	Broadway & 52nd
"I'm Thinking About Your Body"	1997	—	—	—	—	—	—	—	—	—	—	Broadway & 52nd
"You Can't Hold Me Down"	2001	94	160	—	—	—	98	—	—	—	—	An Ordinary Day in an Unusual Place
"Get Out"	2002	174	—	—	—	—	97	—	—	—	—	An Ordinary Day in an Unusual Place
"Say You Belong to Me"	2007	—	—	—	—	—	—	—	—	—	—	Say What!?
"—" denotes releases that did not chart or were not released.

== Other sources ==
- Radio interview with Us3 founder Geoff Wilkinson on Kiss FM February 1992 Us3 Founder Geoff Wilkinson and Born 2 B, Kiss FM London 1992 - Play on N1M
- Ninja Tune - Two decades of mixes and mash-ups
