= Frank Paparelli =

American jazz pianist, composer and author

Frank Paparelli (* December 25, 1917 in Providence, Rhode Island; † May 24, 1973 in Los Angeles, California) was an American Jazz pianist, Composer and Author. He was a pianist in Dizzy Gillespie's band during the mid-1940s, and is notable as the co-writer (with Gillespie) of the bebop standard "A Night in Tunisia" and "Blue 'n' Boogie". However, Paparelli’s songwriting credit for “A Night in Tunisia” was provided by Gillespie as compensation for unrelated transcription work; Paparelli had no part in authoring the song.

== Publications ==
- The Blues and how to Play 'em. Piano method book. New York, Leeds Music 1942
- Don Raye/Frank Paparelli: Piano Music – (That Place) Down the Road a Piece. D. Davis & Co. 1943.
- Nat 'King' Cole – Piano Capers, Transcribed and Edited by Frank Paparelli. New York: Leeds Music Ltd. 1946
- 2 to the Bar - Dixieland Piano Method. New York City, Leeds Music Corporation 1946
- Thelonious Monk, Dizzy Gillespie – 52nd Street Theme - Be-Bop (New Jazz), arranged by Frank Paparelli. London, Bosworth & Co 1948
- Dizzy Gillespie, Gil Fuller, Jay Roberts – Oop Bop SH-Bam - Be-Bop (New Jazz), arranged by Frank Paparelli. London, Bosworth & Co 1948
- Boogie Woogie for Beginners. Hal Leonard Publishing Corporation 1985
