= A Night in Tunisia =

Instrumental by Dizzy Gillespie & His Sextet
- Written: 1942
- Recorded: 1944
- Genre: Jazz; bebop
- Composers: Dizzy Gillespie; Jon Hendricks; Frank Paparelli (credited)

"A Night in Tunisia" is a musical composition written in 1942 by American trumpeter Dizzy Gillespie that has become a jazz standard. Gillespie wrote it while he was playing with the Benny Carter band. The tune is also known as "Interlude".

"A Night in Tunisia" was one of the signature pieces of Gillespie's bebop big band, and he also played it with his small groups. In January 2004, The Recording Academy added Gillespie's 1946 RCA Victor recording to the Grammy Hall of Fame. In June 2026, CBS News included the piece in its list of the 250 essential American songs of the past 250 years.

== Background ==
Gillespie called the tune "Interlude" and said "some genius decided to call it 'A Night in Tunisia' ". According to Gillespie, he composed it at the piano at Kelly's Stables in New York and gave Frank Paparelli co-writer credit as compensation for some unrelated transcription work. However, Paparelli had nothing to do with the song.

On the album A Night at Birdland Vol. 1, Art Blakey introduced his 1954 cover version with this statement: "At this time we'd like to play a tune [that] was written by the famous Dizzy Gillespie. I feel rather close to this tune because I was right there when he composed it in Texas on the bottom of a garbage can." The audience laughs, but Blakey responds, "Seriously." The liner notes say, "The sanitation department can take a low bow."

Jon Hendricks wrote the now-standard lyrics for the tune, which he performed with Lambert, Hendricks & Ross and which were also sung by Ella Fitzgerald. In 1982, Hendricks wrote a new lyric, "Another Night in Tunisia," sung by The Manhattan Transfer on their 1985 Vocalese album and by Bobby McFerrin on his 1986 album Spontaneous Inventions.

== Analysis ==
First measures of A Night in Tunisia

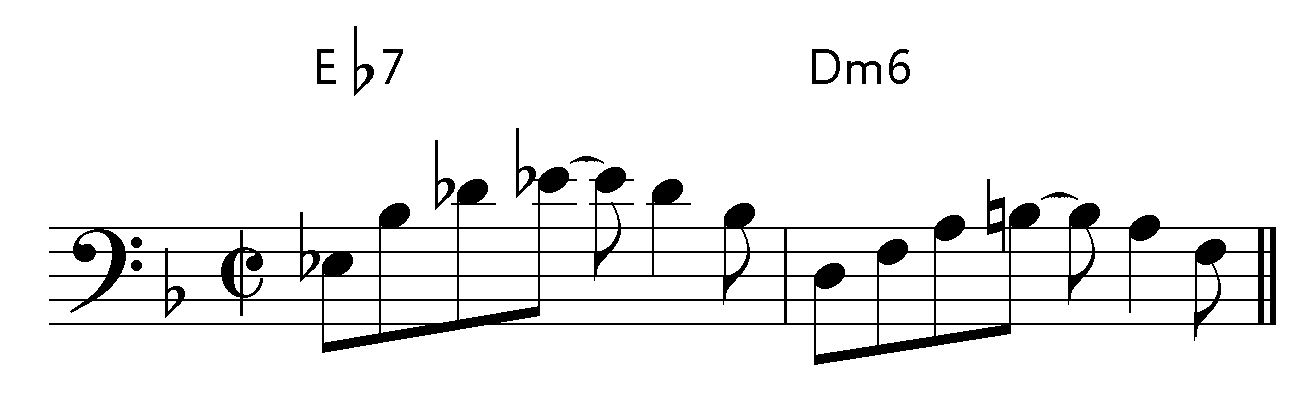
Bass vamp underpinning the A sections of "A Night in Tunisia"

The complex ostinato bass line in the "A section" is notable for avoiding the standard walking bass pattern of straight quarter notes, and the use of oscillating half-step-up/half-step-down chord changes (using the Sub V, a tritone substitute chord for the dominant chord) gives the song a unique, mysterious feeling. The B section is notable for having an unresolved minor II-V, since the chord progression of the B section is taken from the B section of the standard "Alone Together", causing the V chord to lead back into the Sub V of the A section.

Like many of Gillespie's tunes, it features a short written introduction and a brief interlude that occurs between solo sections — in this case, a twelve-bar sequence leading into a four-bar break for the next soloist.

== Notable recordings ==
=== Early recordings 1944–1946 ===
- In January 1944, the Gillespie-Pettiford Quintet made a live recording of the song at the Onyx Club in New York City.
- Sarah Vaughan, backed by Gillespie, recorded a vocal version of "Interlude" on 31 December 1944 which was issued on the Continental label in 1946.
- In January 1945, Gillespie and Pettiford made a studio recording of "Interlude (Night in Tunisia)" as part of "Boyd Raeburn and His Orchestra".
- A live recording of Gillespie and Charlie Parker performing the tune was made at the NYC Town Hall on 22 June 1945.
- Gillespie’s studio recording of 22 February 1946, for RCA Victor, was inducted into the Grammy Hall of Fame in 2004. The personnel included Don Byas, Milt Jackson, Al Haig, Bill DeArango, J.C. Heard, and Ray Brown.
- Parker’s recording of 28 March 1946, for Dial Records, features Miles Davis on trumpet and includes the "famous alto break" that became synonymous with Parker. (Parker's composition "Ornithology" is on the B side.)

=== Cover versions ===
- Sarah Vaughan (1944)
- Boyd Raeburn with Dizzy Gillespie (1945)
- Fats Navarro (1950)
- Bud Powell (1951)
- Charlie Parker and Dizzy Gillespie, Jazz at Massey Hall (1953)
- Sonny Rollins, A Night at the Village Vanguard (1957)
- Art Blakey with Lee Morgan, A Night in Tunisia (1960)
- Ibrahim Maalouf, "Missin' Ya (Night In Tunisia)", Diasporas (2007)
- Jesús Molina, "Night in Tunisia", Departing (2020)
- Imperial Triumphant, A Night in Tunisia (2023)
