= Albert Dailey =

American jazz pianist

- From the cover of That Old Feeling, 1978

Background information
- Born: Albert Preston Dailey; June 16, 1939; Baltimore, Maryland, U.S.
- Died: June 26, 1984 (aged 45) Denver, Colorado
- Genres: Jazz
- Occupation: Musician
- Instrument: Piano

Albert Preston Dailey (June 16, 1939 – June 26, 1984) was an American jazz pianist.

== Early life ==
Dailey was born in Baltimore, Maryland. His parents were Albert Preston Dailey Sr, and Gertrude Johnson Dailey. He began studying piano as a child, and his first professional appearances were with the house band of the Baltimore Royal Theater in the early 1950s. Later in the decade, he studied at Morgan State University and the Peabody Conservatory.

== Later life and career ==
He backed Damita Jo DuBlanc on tour from 1960 to 1963, and following this briefly put together his own trio in Washington, D.C., playing at the Bohemian Caverns. In 1964, he moved to New York City, where he played with Dexter Gordon, Roy Haynes, Sarah Vaughan, Charles Mingus, and Freddie Hubbard. In 1967, he played with Woody Herman at the Monterey Jazz Festival, and played intermittently with Art Blakey's Jazz Messengers from 1968 to 1969.

In the 1970s, Dailey played with Sonny Rollins, Stan Getz, Elvin Jones, and Archie Shepp. In the 1980s, he undertook concerts at Carnegie Hall and was a member of the Upper Manhattan Jazz Society with Charlie Rouse, Benny Bailey, and Buster Williams.

Dailey died in Denver on June 26, 1984, aged 45, from the effects of pneumonia. He is survived by his three children, five grandchildren and four great-grandchildren.

== Discography ==
=== As leader/co-leader ===
Year recorded	Title	Label	Notes
1972	The Day After the Dawn	Columbia	
1977?	Renaissance	Catalyst	
1978	That Old Feeling	SteepleChase	Trio, with Buster Williams (bass), Billy Hart (drums)
1981?	Textures	Muse	with Arthur Rhames (sax), Rufus Reid (bass), Eddie Gladden (drums)
1983	Poetry	Blue Note	Two tracks solo piano; most tracks duo, with Stan Getz (tenor sax)

=== As sideman ===
With Ray Alexander

- Cloud Patterns (Nerus Records, 1983) - live at Eddie Condon's

With Gary Bartz

- Libra (Milestone, 1968)

With Art Blakey

- Backgammon (Roulette, 1976)

With Junior Cook

- Good Cookin' (Muse, 1979)

With Larry Coryell

- Comin' Home (Muse, 1984)

With Eddie "Lockjaw" Davis

- The Heavy Hitter (Muse, 1979)

With Walt Dickerson

- To My Queen Revisited (SteepleChase, 1978)

With Art Farmer

- The Time and the Place: The Lost Concert (Mosaic, 1966 [2007])

With Ricky Ford

- Tenor for the Times (Muse, 1981)
- Future's Gold (Muse, 1983)

With Frank Foster

- Fearless Frank Foster (Prestige, 1965)

With Stan Getz

- The Best of Two Worlds (Columbia, 1975)
- The Master (Columbia, 1975 [1982])
- Poetry (Elektra/Musician, 1983)

With Bunky Green

- Transformations (Vanguard, 1977)
- Places We've Never Been (Vanguard, 1979)

With Slide Hampton

- World of Trombones (West 54, 1979)

With Tom Harrell

- Play of Light (1982)

With Freddie Hubbard

- Backlash (Atlantic, 1966)

With Budd Johnson

- Off the Wall (Argo, 1964) with Joe Newman

With Elvin Jones

- Summit Meeting (Vanguard, 1976) with James Moody, Clark Terry, Bunky Green and Roland Prince
- The Main Force (Vanguard, 1976)

With Lee Konitz

- Figure & Spirit (Progressive, 1976)

With Oliver Nelson

- Encyclopedia of Jazz (Verve, 1966)
- The Sound of Feeling (Verve, 1966)

With Dizzy Reece

- Manhattan Project (1978)

With Charlie Rouse

- The Upper Manhattan Jazz Society (Enja, 1981 [1985]) with Benny Bailey
- Social Call (Uptown, 1984) with Red Rodney

With Archie Shepp

- Ballads for Trane (Denon, 1977)

With Malachi Thompson

- Spirit (Delmark, 1983)

With Harold Vick

- The Caribbean Suite (RCA Victor, 1966)
- Straight Up (RCA Victor, 1967)
