= Live in Japan =

Live in Japan can refer to one of the following albums or videos:

== Albums ==
- Live in Japan (21st Century Schizoid Band album)
- Live in Japan (22-20s album)
- Live in Japan (B. B. King album)
- Live in Japan (Beck, Bogert & Appice album)
- Live in Japan (The Carpenters album)
- Live in Japan (Chicago album)
- Live in Japan (The Country Gentlemen album)
- Live in Japan (Deep Purple album)
- Live in Japan (Do As Infinity album)
- Live in Japan (Duke Jordan album)
- Live in Japan (Fred Frith album)
- Live in Japan (George Harrison album)
- Live in Japan (Glen Campbell album)
- Live in Japan (Hot Tuna album)
- Live in Japan (Leon Russell album)
- Live in Japan (Il Divo album)
- Live in Japan (John Coltrane album)
- Live in Japan (Material album)
- Live in Japan (New Riders of the Purple Sage album)
- Live in Japan (Primal Scream album)
- Live in Japan (Riot album)
- Live in Japan (Rockapella album)
- Live in Japan (Rodrigo y Gabriela album)
- Live in Japan (The Runaways album)
- Live in Japan (Sarah Vaughan album)
- Live in Japan (Sham 69 album)
- Live in Japan (Shirley Bassey album)
- Live in Japan (Simian Mobile Disco album)
- Live in Japan (Slapp Happy album)
- Live in Japan (Stacie Orrico album)
- Live in Japan (Vader album)
- Live in Japan (The Work album)
- Live in Japan, a 1974 album by Wilson Pickett
- Live in Japan, a 1990 album by Night Ranger
- Live in Japan, a 2011 album by former Fleetwood Mac member Bob Welch
- Live in Japan '78 (Count Basie album)
- Live in Japan: Spring Tour 1973, a Donovan album
- Rockin' Every Night – Live in Japan, a Gary Moore album
- Live in Japan 2004, an Incubus album
- EleKtrik: Live in Japan, a King Crimson album
- Rituals: Live in Japan, a Painkiller album
- Destroy All Monsters/Live in Japan, a Raven album
- The Filthy Lucre Tour: Live in Japan, a Sex Pistols album
- Shakatak Live in Japan
- The Jackson 5 in Japan
- Live in Japan 2002, a Simple Plan album
- The Supremes Live! In Japan
- Five out of Five (Live in Japan), a Talisman album
- Open the Window, Close the Door – Live in Japan, a Thunder album
- Live in Japan 1978: Dear John C., an album by jazz drummer Elvin Jones
- Elvin Jones Jazz Machine Live in Japan Vol. 2, an album by jazz drummer Elvin Jones

== Videos ==
- Live in Japan (Earth, Wind & Fire video)
- The Cure Live in Japan
- Super Live in Japan, a Queen + Paul Rodgers DVD
- We Are the Champions: Final Live in Japan, a Queen video
- '89 Live in Japan, a Quiet Riot DVD
- Live from Japan, a concert video by Johnny Winter

== See also ==
- At Budokan (disambiguation)
