= Birdland (New York jazz club) =

Jazz club (1949–1965, 1985–present)

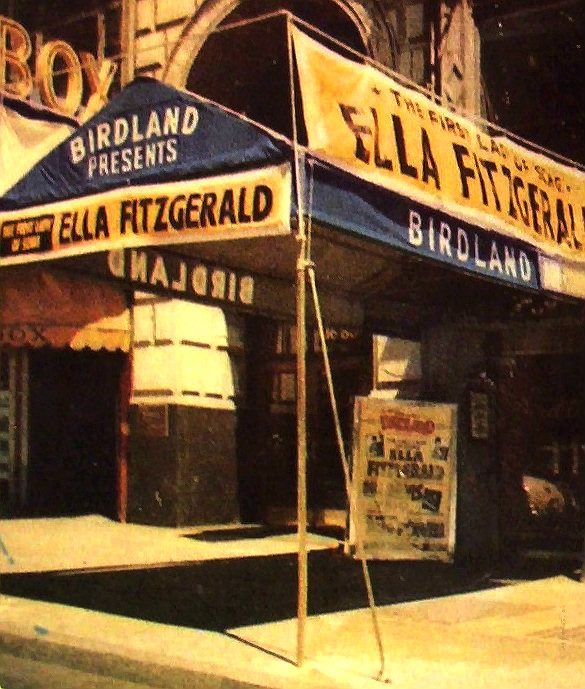
- Birdland entrance
- Interactive map of Birdland
- Address: 315 West 44th St; Manhattan, New York; United States
- Coordinates: 40°45′32″N 73°59′23″W
- Owner: John R. Valenti
- Type: Jazz club
- Event: Jazz
- Public transit: Times Square–42nd Street station

Construction
- Opened: December 15, 1949
- Years active: 1949–1965, 1985–present

Website
- birdlandjazz.com

Birdland is a jazz club started in New York City on December 15, 1949. The original Birdland, which was located at 1678 Broadway, just north of West 52nd Street in Manhattan, was closed in 1965 due to increased rents, but it re-opened for one night in 1979. A revival began in 1986 with the opening of the second nightclub by the same name that is now located in Manhattan's Theater District, not far from the original nightclub's location. The current location is in the same building as the previous headquarters of The New York Observer.

== The original Birdland (1949–1965) ==
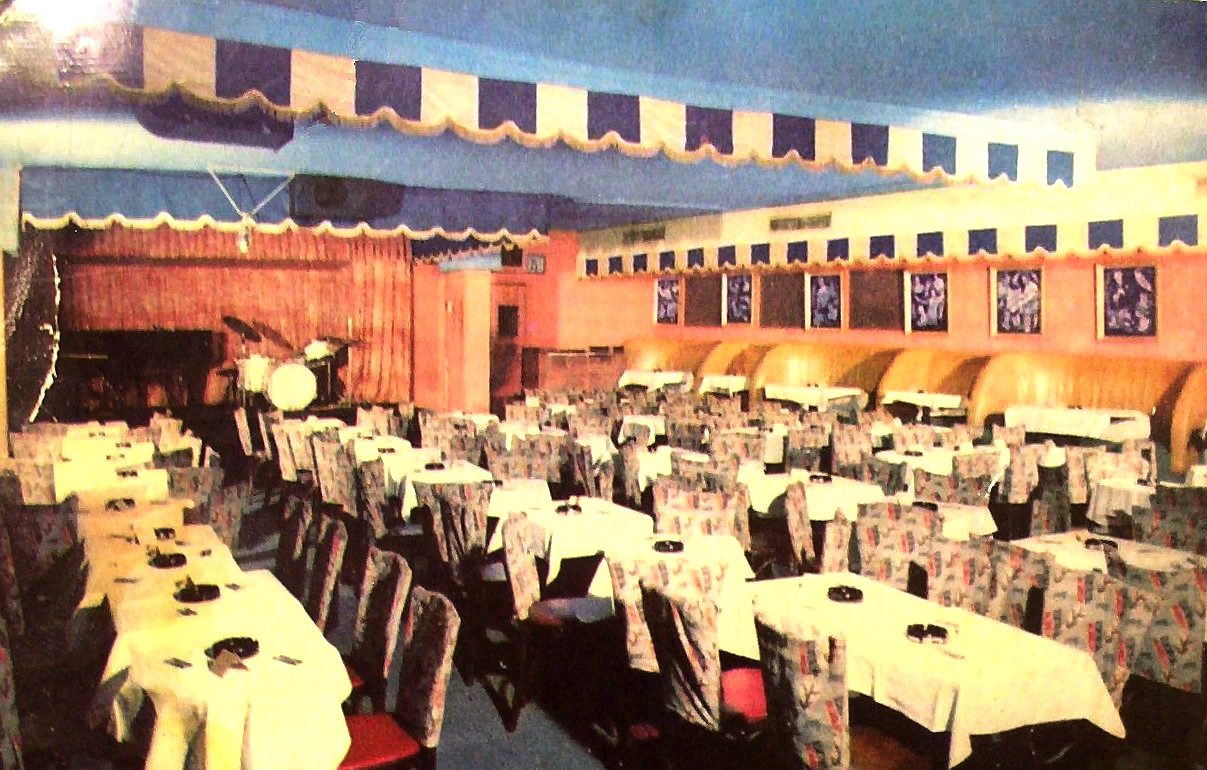
Club interior

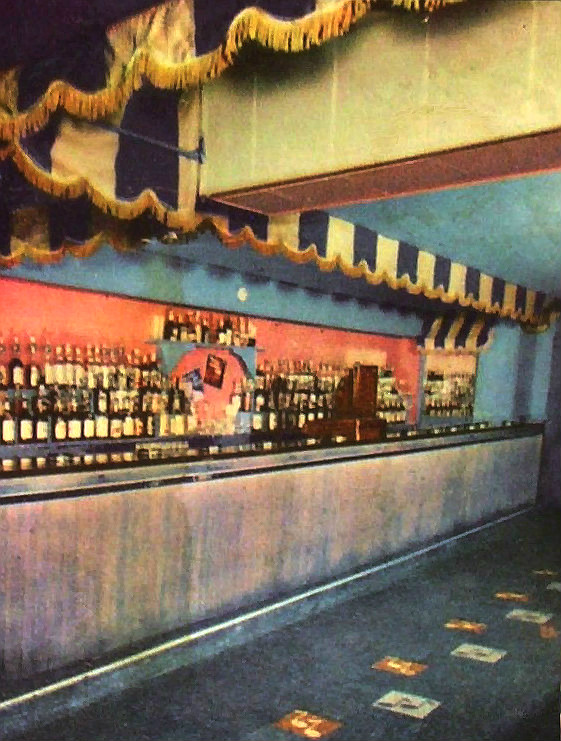
Birdland bar

=== 1678 Broadway, below the street level ===
Irving Levy (1923–1959), Morris Levy, and Oscar Goodstein – along with six other partners – purchased the venue in 1949 from Joseph "Joe the Wop" Catalano. They adopted the name "Birdland" to capitalize on the profile of Charlie "Yardbird" Parker.

The club was originally scheduled to open on September 8, 1949, but this was moved back to December 15 following difficulties in getting a liquor license. The opening night was "A Journey Through Jazz", consisting of various styles of the music up to that point, played by Maxie Kaminsky, Hot Lips Page, Lester Young, Charlie Parker, Harry Belafonte, Stan Getz, and Lennie Tristano, in that order.

Parker played very few jobs at Birdland due to his drug addiction. He didn't cause issues for the management, but as Gene Ramey claimed Goodstein said, "He was continually wanting money." In 1954, Ramey later persuaded Goodstein to let Parker perform at Birdland with his band on a pair of Monday nights.

The neon sign at the front of the club read, "Birdland, Jazz Corner of the World". The venue seated 500 people and had bandstand space for a big band—the Count Basie Orchestra was a regular booking. The venue had a long bar, tables, booths, and a fenced-in bullpen, several rows of folding chairs, some directly alongside a corner of the bandstand, accessible with just the $1.50 admission fee to the venue; a drink could be carried there by an adult, but teenagers were admitted there, too. Irving Levy and Morris Levy were the main owners but the club was operated by Oscar Goodstein, who took tickets and tended the bar. In the late 50s, he moved his post to the back hallway where he could compare the trays from the kitchen with the order tickets. Some lucky few could spend the wee hours chatting with him and reading letters musicians like Charlie Mingus sent to him. Goldstein called Mingus a prolific writer. The name was carried through into the feature of caged finches inside the club.

The venue attracted other jazz musicians who also made recordings there. This includes Art Blakey's February 1954 gigs resulting in the A Night at Birdland albums, most of John Coltrane's Live at Birdland, the Toshiko – Mariano Quartet's Live at Birdland, and Count Basie's Basie at Birdland. Dizzy Gillespie, Thelonious Monk, Miles Davis, Louie Bellson, Bud Powell, Johnny Smith, Stan Getz, Lester Young, and many others made appearances. George Shearing's standard "Lullaby of Birdland" (1952) was named in the club's honor.

The club's original master of ceremonies, the diminutive, four feet tall Pee Wee Marquette, was known for mispronouncing the names of musicians, if they refused to tip him. The disc jockey Symphony Sid broadcast live on WJZ early in the club's existence. Later broadcasts organized in the 1950s with the musicians' union were relayed across network radio with announcers and guests like the jazz critic Leonard Feather.

On August 25, 1959, Miles Davis was beaten by a New York City policeman on the sidewalk in front of Birdland, during a performing engagement at the club.

During the 1950s, Birdland also became a fashionable place for celebrities to be seen, with Frank Sinatra and Ava Gardner, Gary Cooper, Marlon Brando, Marilyn Monroe, Sugar Ray Robinson, Marlene Dietrich, Joe Louis, Judy Garland and others as regulars. Irving Levy was stabbed to death at the club on Sunday, January 26, 1959 (after midnight January 25) while the group of trombonist Urbie Green was performing. The body was discovered in the rear of the club, near the service area. The stabbing had apparently occurred unnoticed by the patrons. Irving's younger brother, Morris, took over Irving's role in the club, and from 1959 through the early 1960s, the club enjoyed great success as one of the few remaining jazz clubs in the area. Johnnie Garry, the production coordinator and historian for the Jazzmobile project, managed the club in the early 1960s.

=== Chapter 11 bankruptcy (June 1964) ===
In June 1964, Birdland filed for Chapter 11 bankruptcy in New York Federal Court. Goodstein was president of the club at the time. Creditors included Goodstein himself ($22,490), NLP Restaurant ($12,275), and saxophonist Gerry Mulligan ($3,500), who had been booked through International Talent Associates. In an effort to stem losses in 1964, Birdland began to feature jazz artists that played a more traditional style of jazz, rather than the "way-out" artists. In 1965, Goodstein closed Birdland. The premises were taken over by Lloyd Price, an R&B and rock-and-roll singer who re-dedicated the venue and named it the Turntable.

== Birdland (1985–present) ==
The third incarnation of Birdland on West 44th Street in 2026

=== 2745 Broadway at West 105th Street (1986–1996) ===
A new Birdland Club, initially owned by John R. Valenti, opened on the Upper West Side of Manhattan in 1985, in the Cleburne Building at 2745 Broadway at the corner of West 105th Street, and presented emerging artists to a neighborhood audience .

=== 315 West 44th Street, between 8th and 9th Avenues (1996–present) ===
In 1996, Valenti moved the club to West 44th Street, west of Eighth Avenue in Midtown Manhattan where it features a full weekly schedule of performers. These have included Michael Brecker, Pat Metheny, Lee Konitz, Diana Krall, Dave Holland, Regina Carter, and Tito Puente. It is the club where Toshiko Akiyoshi's jazz orchestra played its final concert on December 29, 2003; she had also played at the original Birdland. The Birdland Big Band was created in 2006.

== In media ==
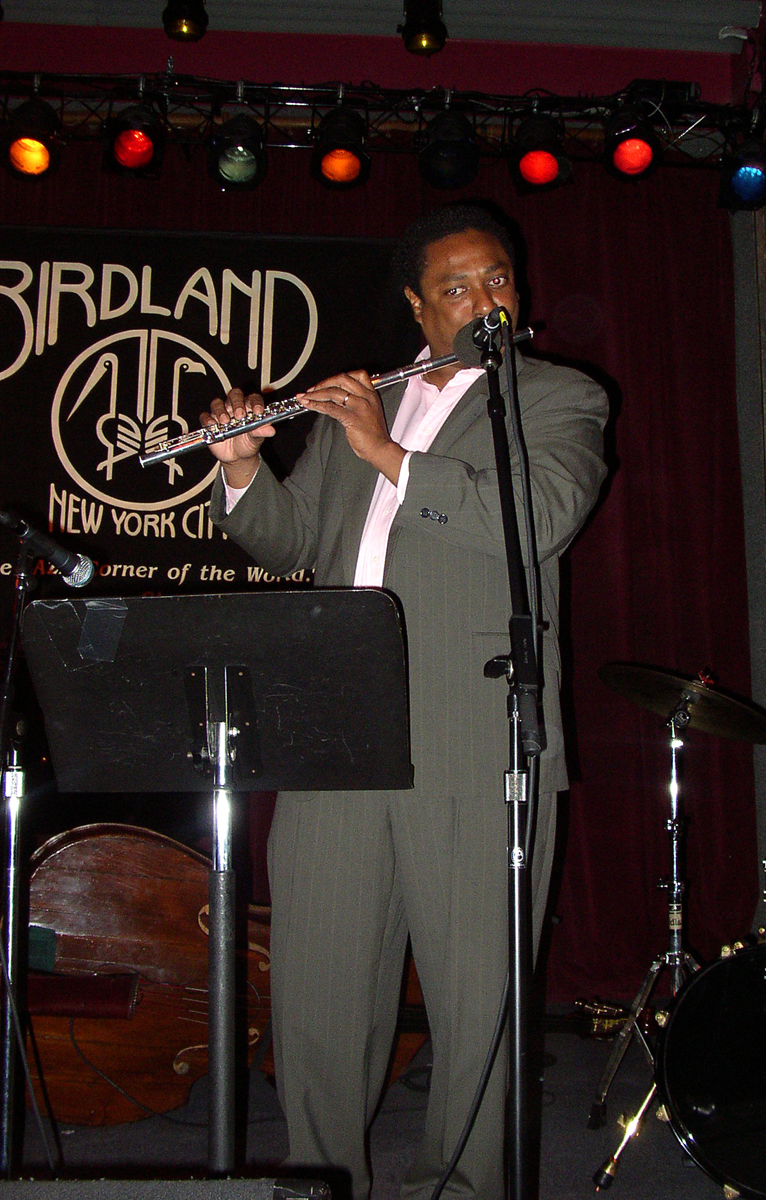
Vincent Herring performing in Birdland in 2005

Birdland was frequented by many of the writers of the Beat Generation. Reference to Birdland is made in Jack Kerouac's novel On the Road: "I saw him wish a well-to-do man Merry Christmas so volubly a five-spot in change for twenty was never missed. We went out and spent it in Birdland, the bop joint. Lester Young was on the stand, eternity on his huge eyelids." Birdland is also referenced in Emmett Grogan's novel Ringolevio. "From the get-go, Birdland became one of his favourite haunts."

George Shearing's jazz standard "Lullaby of Birdland" (with lyrics later added by George David Weiss) refers to the club. Sarah Vaughan's 1954 version was a hit.

In 1993, Us3 released the single "Cantaloop", which opens with the line: "Ladies and gentlemen, as you know, we have something special down here at Birdland this evening"; Pee Wee Marquette's opening announcement from Art Blakey's first Birdland album in 1954. Their second album "Broadway & 52nd" (1997) was named in reference to the location of Birdland.

Weather Report released their most commercially successful hit entitled "Birdland" on the album Heavy Weather in 1977. The Manhattan Transfer recorded a cover version of the same song in 1979, with vocalese lyrics describing the club at its peak.

U2 references the club in the song "Angel of Harlem" with the lyrics "Birdland on 53, the street sounds like a symphony..." The club was however, on Broadway near 52nd Street, not 53rd.

In the play Send Me No Flowers, George Kimball relates a story concerning a female friend who ran off with a "bongo player from Birdland" after her husband died. The bongo player subsequently "took her for every cent". In the play Middle of the Night, the husband remembers the good old days at Birdland with his wife, in an attempt to save their marriage.

Sesame Street featured a night club called Birdland, run by Hoots the Owl, which was occupied by multiple birds.

William Claxton took a picture of the club's entrance in 1960.

The club, along with several artists such as Miles Davis, Ella Fitzgerald, and James Moody, are mentioned in Quincy Jones song "Jazz Corner of the World" [Introduction to Birdland].

Ray Charles references a dance of the same name in the lyrics of his song "What'd I Say": "See the girl with the red dress on, She can do the Birdland all night long...."

== Birdland discography ==
=== The original Birdland (1949–1965) ===
- 1949: Live at Birdland 1949 (Jazz Records 1) – Lennie Tristano Quintet featuring Warne Marsh, Billy Bauer, Arnold Fishkin, and Jeff Morton.
- 1950: One Night In Birdland - Charlie Parker
- 1952: Disorder at the Border - Coleman Hawkins
- 1954: A Night at Birdland – Art Blakey
- 1955: W!ld B!ll Davis at Birdland - Wild Bill Davis
- 1956: Birdland Stars on Tour 1956 (Bluebird) – Kenny Dorham, Conte Candoli, trumpets; Al Cohn, tenor sax; Phil Woods, alto sax; Hank Jones, piano; John Simmons, bass; Kenny Clarke, drums
- 1958: Monday Nights at Birdland - 2 CD set Lee Morgan, Hank Mobley, Billy Root, Curtis Fuller
- 1959: At the Jazz Corner of the World — Art Blakey and the Jazz Messengers
- 1960: Meet You at the Jazz Corner of the World — Art Blakey
- 1960/1961: Live at Birdland – Toshiko – Mariano Quartet
- 1961: Basie at Birdland – Count Basie and his orchestra
- 1962: Joe Williams Live! A Swingin' Night at Birdland – Joe Williams and a quintet featuring Jimmy Forrest and Harry "Sweets" Edison
- 1963: Ugetsu — Art Blakey's Jazz Messengers
- 1964: Live at Birdland – John Coltrane Quartet, featuring Coltrane (tenor sax); McCoy Tyner (piano); Jimmy Garrison (bass); Elvin Jones (drums)

=== Later ===
- March 1990: West 42'nd Street Gary Bartz Quintet Claudio Roditi
- April 1990: Swing Summit Harry Edison Buddy Tate Frank Wess
- June 1990: Ebony Rhapsody Ricky Ford, Jaki Byard, Milt Hinton, Ben Riley
- November 1990: There Goes the Neighborhood Gary Bartz Quartet
- September 1991: American-African Blues Ricky Ford, Jaki Byard, Milt Hinton, Ben Riley
- December 1996: Jimmy Bruno Trio with Guest Bobby Watson

== Notable performers ==
=== Original Birdland (1949–1965) ===
- Chet Baker
- Count Basie
- Louie Bellson
- Tony Bennett
- George Benson
- Art Blakey
- Dave Brubeck
- Ron Carter
- John Coltrane
- Wild Bill Davis
- Miles Davis
- Sammy Davis Jr.
- Blossom Dearie
- Billy Eckstine
- Duke Ellington
- Bill Evans
- Maynard Ferguson
- Ella Fitzgerald
- Slim Gaillard
- Erroll Garner
- Stan Getz
- Dizzy Gillespie
- Friedrich Gulda
- Lionel Hampton
- Slide Hampton
- Roy Haynes
- Jon Hendricks
- Billie Holiday
- Dave Holland
- Freddie Hubbard
- Hank Jones
- Quincy Jones
- La Lupe
- Lambert, Hendricks & Ross
- Michel Legrand
- Ramsey Lewis
- Pat Martino
- Marian McPartland
- Robin Meade
- Pat Moran McCoy
- Carmen McRae
- Charles Mingus
- Modern Jazz Quartet
- Thelonious Monk
- Gerry Mulligan
- Anita O'Day
- Chico O'Farrill
- Charlie Parker
- Oscar Peterson
- Oscar Pettiford
- Lloyd Price
- Machito
- Tito Puente
- Tito Rodríguez
- Bud Powell
- Buddy Rich
- Mongo Santamaria
- George Shearing
- Bobby Short
- Horace Silver
- Nina Simone
- Johnny Smith
- Billy Taylor
- Clark Terry
- Mel Torme
- Lennie Tristano
- McCoy Tyner
- Sarah Vaughan
- Dinah Washington
- Joe Williams
- Tony Williams
- Lester Young
- Joe Zawinul

=== Birdland (1985–present) ===
- Toshiko Akiyoshi
- Lew Anderson
- James Stacy Barbour
- Michael Brecker
- Ann Hampton Callaway
- Ron Carter
- Ravi Coltrane
- Harry Connick Jr.
- Luann de Lesseps
- Kurt Elling
- Kevin Eubanks
- Michael Feinstein
- Champian Fulton
- Anita Gillette
- Vince Giordano & The Nighthawks
- Savion Glover
- Ilene Graff
- Ariana Grande
- Jeff Harnar
- Sam Harris
- Andrew Hill
- Norah Jones
- Stanley Jordan
- Diana Krall
- Bonnie Langford
- Joe Lovano
- Lorna Luft
- Melissa Manchester
- Marilyn Maye
- Marian McPartland
- Pat Metheny
- Liza Minnelli
- James Moody
- Mark Murphy
- Oscar Peterson
- Michel Petrucciani
- John Pizzarelli
- Charlie Puth
- Chita Rivera
- Annaleigh Ashford
- McCoy Tyner
- John Scofield
- Maria Schneider
- Miranda Sings
- Phoebe Snow
- Billy Stritch
- Frank Vignola
- Phil Woods
- Yellowjackets
- Stefano Bollani
- Freddy Cole

== See also ==
- List of jazz clubs
