= Healing the Pain =

1990 studio album by saxophonist Bunky Green

Studio album by Bunky Green
- Released: 1990
- Recorded: December 13 & 14, 1989
- Studio: Sage & Sound Studios, Hollywood, CA
- Genre: Jazz
- Length: 65:52
- Label: Delos; DE 4020
- Producer: Ed Bland

Bunky Green chronology
Visions (1978)	Healing the Pain (1990)	Another Place (2006)

Healing the Pain is an album by saxophonist Bunky Green recorded in Califordia and released by the Delos label in 1990.

== Reception ==
Professional ratings
Review scores
Source	Rating
AllMusic	4.5/5 stars
Los Angeles Times	4/5 stars
The Penguin Guide to Jazz Recordings	3.5/4 stars

AllMusic reviewer Scott Yanow stated: "Green sails in and out of the chord changes and makes most of his solos into a do-or-die situation full of emotional intensity, especially when he plays alto ... Green shows that he is not afraid to occasionally caress a melody and frequently emphasizes unexpected notes ... Green is in top form on what may very well be his definitive recording. Highly recommended".

In the Los Angeles Times, Leonard Feather wrote: "Green has earned scant recognition for his Parker-inspired yet personal alto sax. The ballads are the meat of this season ... Ed Bland, Green’s producer, contributed three themes from his score for last year’s PBS-TV version of Raisin in the Sun. To round out this well-balanced set, Green wrote two provocative originals. He has just the kind of sympathetic rhythm section he deserved".

== Track listing ==
All compositions by Ed Bland, except where indicated.

1. "The Thrill Is Gone" (Lew Brown, Ray Henderson) – 7:30
2. "Walter's Theme" – 6:39
3. "Who Can I Turn To?" (Anthony Newley, Leslie Bricusse) – 7:14
4. "I Concentrate on You" (Cole Porter) – 6:03
5. "Love Theme" – 4:41
6. "You've Changed" (Carl Fischer, Bill Carey) – 5:50
7. "Wild Life" (Bunky Green) – 4:56
8. "Radio Theme" – 3:40
9. "Everything I Have Is Yours" (Burton Lane, Harold Adamson) – 5:30
10. "Seashells" (Green) – 3:46
11. "Goodbye" (Gordon Jenkins) – 7:23
12. "Love Theme - Reprise" – 1:55

== Personnel ==
- Bunky Green - alto saxophone, soprano saxophone
- Billy Childs – piano
- Art Davis – bass
- Ralph Penland – drums
