= That Old Feeling =

That Old Feeling may refer to:

- "That Old Feeling" (song), a 1937 popular song
- That Old Feeling (Al Cohn album), a 1956 album by saxophonist Al Cohn featuring the above song
- That Old Feeling (Albert Dailey album), a 1956 album by pianist Albert Dailey featuring the above song
- That Old Feeling (Bud Shank album), a 1986 album by saxophonist Bud Shank featuring the above song
- That Old Feeling (film), a 1997 romantic comedy
- That Old Feeling, an album by Billy Eckstine
