= Eddie Higgins =

American jazz pianist, composer, and orchestrator

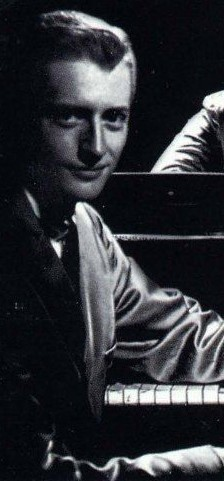
- Higgins in 1957

Background information
- Born: Hayden Higgins; February 21, 1932; Cambridge, Massachusetts, U.S.
- Died: August 31, 2009 (aged 77) Fort Lauderdale, Florida, U.S.
- Genre: Jazz
- Occupations: Musician, composer, arranger, singer
- Instruments: Piano, vocals
- Years active: 1956–2009
- Labels: Atlantic, Sunnyside

Edward Haydn Higgins (February 21, 1932 – August 31, 2009) was an American jazz pianist, composer, and orchestrator. His performance and composition in 1959's "Cry of Jazz" is preserved in the Library of Congress' National Film Registry.

== Biography ==
Born and raised in Cambridge, Massachusetts, United States, Higgins initially studied privately with his mother. He started his professional career in Chicago, Illinois, while studying at the Northwestern University School of Music and earned a spot in fellow Northwestern alumnus Paul Severson's band in 1956 before leading his own band in 1957.

For more than two decades Higgins worked at some of Chicago's most prestigious jazz clubs, including the Brass Rail, Preview Lounge, Blue Note, Cloister Inn and Jazz, Ltd. His longest and most memorable tenure was at the long-gone London House, where he led his jazz trio from 1957 to the late 1960s, playing opposite jazz stars of this period, including Cannonball Adderley, Bill Evans, Erroll Garner, Stan Getz, Dizzy Gillespie, Wes Montgomery, Oscar Peterson and George Shearing, among others. Later, Higgins said the opportunities to play jazz music with Coleman Hawkins and Oscar Peterson were unforgettable moments. Higgins spent his time at the London House Restaurant with bassist Richard Evans and drummer Marshall Thompson. Higgins also worked for Chess Records as a producer.

During his stay in Chicago, Higgins also recorded a significant number of albums under his auspices and many more as a sideman with a wide variety of musicians, ranging in style from tenor saxophonists Hawkins to Sonny Stitt to Wayne Shorter; trumpeters Bobby Lewis to Harry Edison to Lee Morgan and Freddie Hubbard; and trombonists Jack Teagarden to Al Grey. His versatility was captured on stage and records, backing up singers and leading his own projects as both pianist and orchestrator, working in every jazz circle from dixieland to modal styles. Although he opted to decline the offer, Higgins was asked at one point by Art Blakey to join the seminal hard bop quintet, The Jazz Messengers.

In 1970, Higgins moved to Fort Lauderdale, Florida, and began spending winters in Florida and summers on Cape Cod, where he played in local clubs. Since the early 1980s, he traveled widely on the jazz festival circuit and performed frequently in Europe and Japan. His releases on the Japanese Venus label earned him number one in jazz sales on more than one album. After that, Higgins played his music mainly in East Asia including Japan and South Korea. During his career in East Asia, Higgins formed a successful trio with Joe Ascione (drums), and Jay Leonhart (bass). In 1988, Higgins and jazz singer and pianist Meredith d'Ambrosio were married and became a popular team at clubs and festivals, as well as recording for Sunnyside Records.

In 2009, dates in Japan and Korea were on his calendar of upcoming concerts, but were suspended due to a long illness.

Higgins died on August 31, 2009, of lung and lymphatic cancer in Fort Lauderdale at the age of 77.

== Style ==
Eddie Higgins's delicate tone and conception were often compared to those of Bill Evans, one of the most influential and successful jazz pianists. He mostly played bop and mainstream jazz music throughout his career. Higgins was at home playing melodies with swing-like feeling. His melodies had groove and swing without being superfluous, and was often compared to Oscar Peterson and Nat King Cole.

== Accomplishment ==
In 2009, Eddie Higgins received Jazz Disc Award from the most respected jazz magazine in Japan, Swing Journal. With his album, Portraits of Love, Higgins won the Best Album of the Year. In the same year, Higgins received another award from Best Engineering Album of the Year.

== Discography ==
=== As leader ===
Year recorded	Title	Label	Year released	Notes
1957	The Ed Higgins Trio	Replica	1957	Trio, with Dave Poskonka (bass), Jack Noren (drums)
1960 – 1961	Eddie Higgins	Vee-Jay	1961	Some tracks trio with Jim Atlas (bass), Marshall Thompson (drums); some tracks quintet, with Paul Serrano (trumpet), Frank Foster (tenor sax) added; some tracks trio with Richard Evans (bass), Thompson (drums)
1965	Soulero	Atlantic	1966	Trio, with Richard Evans (bass) Marshall Thompson (drums)
1966	The Piano of Eddie Higgins	Atlantic	1967	Some tracks trio; some tracks with orchestra
1969	Music from Chitty Chitty Bang Bang	Tower	1969	Trio, with Richard Evans (bass), Marshall Thompson (drums)
1978	My Time of Day	Claremont	1978	Trio, with John Bany (bass), Marshall Thompson (drums) Recorded October 24–25, 1978. Reissued as In Chicago (1995)
1978	Dream Dancing	Claremont	1978	Trio, with John Bany (bass), Marshall Thompson (drums) Recorded October 24–25, 1978 Reissued as In Chicago (1995)
1980	Sweet Lorraine	EMI	1980	Trio, with Osamu Kawakami (bass), Jimmy Takeuchi (drums)
1982	Once in a While	Spinnster	1982	Most tracks sextet, with Pete Minger (flugelhorn), John Swan (flugelhorn, trumpet), Bill Prince (flugelhorn, trumpet, tenor sax), Lew Berryman (bass), Norman "Red" Hawley (drums); one track septet, with Nancy Weckwerth (French horn) added; in concert
1986	By Request	Statiras	1986	Trio, with Milt Hinton (bass), Bobby Rosengarden (drums)
1990	Those Quiet Days	Sunnyside	1991	Trio, with Kevin Eubanks (guitar), Rufus Reid (bass)
1986, 1992	By Request	Solo Art	1992	Trio plus solo piano. Reissue of 1986 with newly recorded tracks.
1994	Zoot's Hymns	Sunnyside	1994	Quartet, with John Doughten (tenor sax), Phil Flanigan (bass), Danny Burger (drums)
1996	Portrait in Black and White	Sunnyside	1996	Trio, with Don Wilner (bass), James Martin (drums)
1997	Haunted Heart	Venus	1997	Trio, with Ray Drummond (bass), Ben Riley (drums)
1998	Speaking of Jobim	Venus	1999	Trio, with Jay Leonhart (bass), Terry Clarke (drums)
1998	Again	Venus	1998	Trio, with Ray Drummond (bass), Ben Riley (drums)
1999	Live At The Van Dyke Cafe in Miami	Navie Novie Choice	1999	Duo, with Don Wilner (bass); in concert
1999	Time on My Hands	Arbors	2000	Solo piano
2000	Don't Smoke in Bed	Venus	2000	Trio, with John Pizzarelli (guitar), Jay Leonhart (bass)
2001	Bewitched	Venus	2001	Trio, with Jay Leonhart (bass), Joe Ascione (drums)
2001	Smoke Gets in Your Eyes	Venus	2002	Quartet, with Scott Hamilton (tenor sax), Steve Gilmore (bass), Bill Goodwin (drums)
2002	Dear Old Stockholm	Venus	2002	Trio, with Jay Leonhart (bass), Joe Ascione (drums)
2002	My Foolish Heart	Venus	2003	Quartet, with Scott Hamilton (tenor sax), Steve Gilmore (bass), Bill Goodwin (drums)
2003	You Don't Know What Love Is	Venus	2004	Solo piano
2003	Moonlight Becomes You	Venus	2003	With Joe Locke (vibes) Joe Cohn (guitar), Jay Leonhart (bass), Joe Ascione (drums); plus strings
2004	If Dreams Come True	Venus	2004	Trio, with Jay Leonhart (bass), Joe Ascione (drums)
2004	Christmas Songs	Venus	2004	Trio, with Jay Leonhart (bass), Joe Ascione (drums)
2004	My Funny Valentine	Venus	2005	Quartet, with Scott Hamilton (tenor sax), Jay Leonhart (bass), Joe Ascione (drums)
2005	Amor	Venus	2005	Trio, with Sean Smith (bass), Joe Ascione (drums)
2006	Christmas Songs 2	Venus	2006	Most tracks trio, with George Mraz (bass), Ben Riley(drums); two tracks quartet, with Scott Hamilton (tenor sax) added
2006	A Fine Romance	Venus	2007	Trio, with Jay Leonhart (bass), Mark Taylor (drums)
2006	A Lovely Way to Spend an Evening	Venus	2007	Trio, with Jay Leonhart (bass), Mark Taylor (drums)
2006	Secret Love	Venus	2007	Trio, with Jay Leonhart (bass), Mark Taylor (drums)
2006	You Are Too Beautiful	Venus	2007	Trio, with Jay Leonhart (bass), Mark Taylor (drums)
2006	It's Magic	Venus	2006	With Scott Hamilton (tenor sax), Ken Peplowski (tenor sax, clarinet), Jay Leonhart (bass), Ben Riley (drums)
2008	A Handful of Stars	Venus	2009	With Scott Hamilton (tenor sax), Ken Peplowski (tenor sax, clarinet), Jay Leonhart (bass), Joe Ascione (drums)
2008	Standards By Request 1st Day	Venus	2008	Solo piano
2008	Standards By Request 2nd Day	Venus	2008	Solo piano
2008	Portraits of Love	Venus	2009	Trio, with Jay Leonhart (bass), Joe Ascione (drums)

Collaboration
With Rebecca Parris and Michael Monaghan

- Double Rainbow (Weston Blair Productions, 1987)

Compilations

- Relaxin' at the Lounge (Venus)
- Standard Higgins (Venus)
- Ballad Higgins (Venus)
- Tenderly: The Best of Eddie Higgins (Venus)

=== As sideman ===
With Meredith d'Ambrosio

- South to a Warmer Place (Sunnyside, 1989)
- Love Is Not a Game (Sunnyside, 1991)
- Shadowland (Sunnyside, 1993)
- Beware of Spring! (Sunnyside, 1995)
- Love Is for the Birds (Sunnyside, 2001)

With Chuck Hedges

- No Greater Love (Arbors, 1992)
- Just for Fun (Arbors, 2001)

With Lee Morgan

- Expoobident (Vee-Jay, 1960)
- Just in Time (Artistry, 2002) – compilation

With Paul Severson

- Jazz (Replica, 1957)
- Misty Island/Please Love Me (Altair, 1957)

With Wayne Shorter

- Wayning Moments (Vee-Jay, 1962) – rec. 1961
- All or Nothing at All (Vee-Jay, 2002) – compilation
- Beginnings (Proper, 2013)[4CD] – compilation

With Sonny Stitt

- Sonny, Sweets, and Jaws: Live at Bubba's (Who's Who in Jazz, 1982) – live rec. 1981
- There Is No Greater Love (Jazz Hour, 1992) – live rec. 1981
- No Greater Love (Starburst, 2001) – compilation

With Warren Vaché

- Mrs. Vache's Boys (Nagel-Heyer, 1999)
- Remember (Nagel-Heyer, 2007) – remastered reissue of Mrs. Vache's Boys (1999)

With others

- 1957 Lucy Reed, This Is Lucy Reed (Fantasy)
- 1959 Cy Touff, Touff Assignment (Argo)
- 1961 Al Grey, The Thinking Man's Trombone (Argo) – rec. 1960
- 1961 Don Goldie, Brilliant! (Argo)
- 1979 Jack Teagarden, Sextet in Person (Fanfare) – rec. 1963
- 1984 Bill Allred, Hot & Blue (Sunjazz)
- 1987 Carl Fontana, The Great Fontana (Uptown) – rec. 1985
- 1992 George Masso, The Wonderful World of George Gershwin (Nagel Heyer)
- 1996 John Doughten, A Time for Love (Sunnyside)
- 1996 Betty Dickson, Stolen Goods (B & D Productions)
- 1999 Jay Leonhart, Great Duets (Chiaroscuro) – rec. 1996
- 2001 Greg Fishman, Indian Summer (JR) – rec. 1999
- 2016 Wes Montgomery, One Night in Indy (Resonance) – live rec. 1959
