= Summit Meeting (Elvin Jones album) =

Studio album by Elvin Jones, James Moody, Clark Terry, Bunky Green and Roland Prince
- Released: 1977
- Recorded: November 18, 1976
- Studio: Vanguard, New York City, NY
- Genre: Jazz
- Length: 40:17
- Label: Vanguard; VSD 79390
- Producer: Ed Bland

Elvin Jones chronology
The Main Force (1976)	Summit Meeting (1977)	Time Capsule (1977)

Bunky Green chronology
Transformations (1977)	Summit Meeting (1977)	Visions (1978)

Summit Meeting is a jazz album by drummer Elvin Jones, saxophonists James Moody and Bunky Green, trumpeter Clark Terry and guitarist Roland Prince, recorded in 1976 and released on the Vanguard label.

== Reception ==
The AllMusic review by Ken Drtyden described the album as containing "a lot of fun".

Professional ratings
Review scores
Source	Rating
AllMusic	4/5 stars
The Rolling Stone Jazz Record Guide	3/5 stars

== Track listing ==
1. "Tee Pee Music" (Clark Terry) - 8:06
2. "Blues for Clark" (Bunky Green) - 5:55
3. "Moody Magic" (Ed Bland) - 6:09
4. "Summit Song" (Green) - 10:11
5. "Jones" (Terry) - 9:56

== Personnel ==
- Elvin Jones – drums
- Clark Terry – trumpet, flugelhorn
- Bunky Green – alto saxophone
- James Moody – tenor saxophone
- Albert Dailey – piano
- Roland Prince – guitar
- David Williams – bass
- Angel Allende – percussion
