= The Latinization of Bunky Green =

Studio album by Bunky Green
- Released: 1967
- Recorded: November 1966
- Studio: Ter Mar Recording Studios, Chicago, IL
- Genre: Jazz
- Length: 35:05
- Label: Cadet; LP/LPS-780
- Producer: Esmond Edwards

Bunky Green chronology
Soul in the Night (1965)	The Latinization of Bunky Green (1967)	Transformations (1977)

The Latinization of Bunky Green is an album by saxophonist Bunky Green recorded in Chicago and released by the Cadet label in 1967.

Professional ratings
Review scores
Source	Rating
AllMusic	2/5 stars

== Track listing ==
All compositions by Edith Green, except where indicated.

1. "Do It Like You Feel It" – 6:12
2. "How's Your Mambo?" – 5:55
3. "Feeling Good" (Leslie Bricusse, Anthony Newley) – 6:15
4. "Guajira Con Cha-Cha-Cha" (Vitin Santiago) – 6:33
5. "A-Ting-a-Ling" (Phil Wright) – 4:27
6. "Song for My Parents" – 4:57
7. "Let Me Go" – 6:08
8. "Fast 'n' Foxy" – 5:43

== Personnel ==
- Bunky Green – alto saxophone, varitone
- Arthur Hoyle – trumpet
- Larry Boyle – trombone
- Bob Ojeda – valve trombone
- Antonio Castro – piano
- Tony LaRosa – bass
- Willie Negron – congas
- Vitin Santiago – oijdo
- Manuel Ramos – timbales
- The Dells – vocals
