= Time Capsule (Elvin Jones album) =

Studio album by Elvin Jones
- Released: 1977
- Recorded: 1976–77; New York City
- Genre: Jazz funk
- Length: 40:36
- Label: Vanguard; VSD 79389
- Producer: Ed Bland

Elvin Jones chronology
Summit Meeting (1976)	Time Capsule (1977)	Remembrance (1978)

Time Capsule is a jazz album by drummer Elvin Jones, recorded in 1976–77 and released on the Vanguard label.

== Reception ==
Professional ratings
Review scores
Source	Rating
AllMusic	3/5 stars
DownBeat	3.5/5 stars
The Penguin Guide to Jazz Recordings	3/4 stars
The Rolling Stone Jazz Record Guide	3/5 stars

The AllMusic review by Scott Yanow states: "Overall, the music is worthwhile, although not quite adding up to the sum of its many parts; the set has very little unity despite some individual fireworks".

== Track listing ==
1. "Frost Bite" (Ryo Kawasaki) - 7:57
2. "Digital Display" (Ed Bland) - 7:33
3. "Moon Dance" (Bunky Green) - 6:20
4. "Time Capsule" (Green) - 8:11
5. "Spacing" (Green) - 10:35

== Personnel ==
- Elvin Jones - drums
- Frank Wess - flute (track 1 & 2)
- Frank Foster - soprano saxophone (track 2)
- Bunky Green - alto saxophone
- George Coleman - tenor saxophone (tracks 1 & 3–5)
- Kenny Barron - electric piano
- Ryo Kawasaki - guitar
- Milt Hinton (tracks 1 & 2), Jiunie Booth (tracks 3–5) - bass
- Angel Allende - percussion
