= Transformations (album) =

Studio album by Bunky Green
- Released: 1977
- Recorded: November 1976
- Studio: Vanguard Studios, New York City, NY
- Genre: Jazz
- Length: 43:35
- Label: Vanguard; VSD 79387
- Producer: Ed Bland

Bunky Green chronology
The Latinization of Bunky Green (1967)	Transformations (1977)	Summit Meeting (1977)

Transformations is an album by saxophonist Bunky Green recorded in New York and released by the Vanguard label in 1977.

== Reception ==
Professional ratings
Review scores
Source	Rating
AllMusic	4/5 stars
The Penguin Guide to Jazz Recordings	3/4 stars

AllMusic reviewer Scott Yanow stated: "The first of three recordings that altoist Bunky Green made for Vanguard in the mid- to late 1970s is a fine all-around effort with Green performing three originals and uplifting three pop songs ... Green sounds fine on this set, displaying a distinctive tone and an inquisitive musical spirit.".

== Track listing ==
All compositions by Bunky Green, except where indicated.

1. "I Won't Last a Day Without You" (Roger Nichols, Paul Williams) – 6:24
2. "Europa" (Carlos Santana, Tom Coster) – 7:55
3. "Feelings" (Loulou Gasté, Morris Albert) – 7:33
4. "Lady from Ancona" – 3:31
5. "Chillon" – 8:19
6. "Funk Ain't a Word" – 9:40

== Personnel ==
- Bunky Green - alto saxophone
- Clark Terry – trumpet (track 3)
- Billy Butler, Carl Lynch – guitar
- Al Dailey – piano
- Wilbur Bascomb – bass
- Jimmy Johnson – drums
- Al Chalk – percussion
