= Visions (Bunky Green album) =

Studio album by Bunky Green
- Released: 1978
- Recorded: 1978
- Studio: Vanguard 23rd Street Studio, New York City, NY
- Genre: Jazz
- Length: 43:35
- Label: Vanguard; VSD 79413
- Producer: Ed Bland

Bunky Green chronology
Summit Meeting (1977)	Visions (1978)	Places We've Never Been (1979)

Visions is an album by saxophonist Bunky Green recorded in New York and released by the Vanguard label in 1978.

== Reception ==
Professional ratings
Review scores
Source	Rating
AllMusic	4/5 stars

AllMusic reviewer Scott Yanow stated: "Although much of the material on altoist Bunky Green's Vanguard album is rather unlikely, Green's solos uplift and give a new slant to the pop tunes. Green is assisted by an oversized rhythm section that includes guitarist Hiram Bullock".

== Track listing ==
1. "Alone Again, Naturally" (Gilbert O'Sullivan) – 6:20
2. "What I Did for Love" (Marvin Hamlisch, Edward Kleban) – 7:07
3. "The Greatest Love of All" (Michael Masser, Linda Creed) – 6:45
4. "Never Can Say Goodbye"(Clifton Davis) – 6:00
5. "Ali Theme/ I Write the Songs" (Masser / Bruce Johnston) – 2:56
6. "The Entertainer" (Scott Joplin) – 4:01
7. "Visions" (Bunky Green) – 7:48

== Personnel ==
- Bunky Green - alto saxophone
- Hiram Bullock – guitar
- Mark Gray– piano, electric piano, synthesizer
- Jeff Bova – synthesizer
- Wilbur Bascomb (tracks 1–6), Bob Cranshaw (track 7) – bass
- Michael Carvin (track 7), Steve Jordan (tracks 1–6) – drums
- Angel Allende – percussion
