= American-African Blues =

Live album by Ricky Ford
- Released: 1992
- Recorded: September 16, 1991
- Venue: Birdland, New York City, U.S.
- Genre: Jazz
- Length: 1:03:36
- Label: Candid
- Producer: Mark Morgarelli

Ricky Ford chronology
| Hot Brass (1991) | American-African Blues (1991) | Tenor Madness Too! (1994) |

Professional ratings
Review scores
| Source | Rating |
|---|---|
| AllMusic | 4/5 stars |

American-African Blues is an album by saxophonist Ricky Ford.

== Recording and music ==
American-African Blues was recorded in concert at Birdland, New York City, on September 16, 1991. It is a quartet recording, with leader Ricky Ford (tenor sax) joined by Jaki Byard (piano), Milt Hinton (bass), and Ben Riley (drums). The album was produced by Mark Morgarelli.

== Track listing ==
All compositions are by Ricky Ford.

1. "American-African Blues (1st Version)" – 10:56
2. "Environ" – 7:01
3. "Of" – 8:14
4. "Complex Harmony" – 6:41
5. "Descent" – 8:36
6. "Mostly Arco" – 5:52
7. "Encore" – 8:54
8. "American-African Blues (2nd Version)" – 7:22

== Personnel ==
- Ricky Ford – tenor sax
- Jaki Byard – piano
- Milt Hinton – bass
- Ben Riley – drums
