= Ebony Rhapsody =

Live album by Ricky Ford
- Released: 1990
- Recorded: June 2, 1990
- Venue: Birdland (New York City)
- Genre: Jazz
- Length: 56:11
- Label: Candid
- Producer: Mark Morganelli

Ricky Ford chronology
Manhattan Blues (1989)	Ebony Rhapsody (1990)	Hot Brass (1992)

Ebony Rhapsody is an album by saxophonist Ricky Ford.

== Recording and music ==
Ebony Rhapsody was recorded in concert at Birdland in New York City on June 2, 1990, and released on CD by Candid Records. It is a quartet recording, with leader Ricky Ford (tenor sax) joined by Jaki Byard (piano), Milt Hinton (bass), and Ben Riley (drums). Five of the nine tracks are Ford originals.

== Reception ==
Professional ratings
Review scores
Source	Rating
AllMusic	4/5 stars
The Penguin Guide to Jazz Recordings	3.5/4 stars

The AllMusic review by Scott Yanow stated "Tenor-saxophonist Ricky Ford is in his usual swinging form on this live quartet date ... easily recommended to fans of the distinctive tenor and those who enjoy modern hard bop". The Chicago Tribune reviewer commented that "Though there is nothing particularly musically distinctive about any of it, the recording is vivid and makes you wish you'd been there to hear it happen".

== Track listing ==
All compositions by Ricky Ford except where noted

1. Introduction by Mark Morganelli - 0:34
2. "Ebony Rhapsody" (Franz Liszt) – 8:42
3. "Mon Amour" – 6:43
4. "Independence Blues" – 7:35
5. "Mirror Man" – 4:57
6. "In a Sentimental Mood" (Duke Ellington) – 4:40
7. "Setting Sun Blues" – 8:10
8. "Broadway" (Henri Woode) – 8:35
9. "Red, Crack and Blue" – 6:15

== Personnel ==
- Ricky Ford – tenor sax
- Jaki Byard – piano
- Milt Hinton – bass
- Ben Riley – drums
