= Looking Ahead (Ricky Ford album) =

Studio album by Ricky Ford
- Released: 1987
- Recorded: February 14 and October 9, 1986
- Studio: Van Gelder Studio, Englewood Cliffs, NJ
- Genre: Jazz
- Length: 39:49
- Label: Muse; MR 5322
- Producer: Michael Cuscuna

Ricky Ford chronology
Shorter Ideas (1984)	Looking Ahead (1987)	Saxotic Stomp (1987)

Looking Ahead is an album by saxophonist Ricky Ford which was recorded in 1986 and released on the Muse label.

== Reception ==
Professional ratings
Review scores
Source	Rating
AllMusic	4/5 stars

The AllMusic review by Ron Wynn stated "An outstanding session, with a first-rate supporting cast".

== Track listing ==
All compositions by Ricky Ford except where noted

1. "Onward Forward" – 5:50
2. "Back to America" – 4:39
3. "Conga Brava" (Duke Ellington, Juan Tizol) – 4:48
4. "Ancient Air" – 5:31
5. "Circle of Ben" – 4:27
6. "Living Doll" – 4:52
7. "Supra Chances" - 6:27
8. "Quiet Reflections" – 3:15

== Personnel ==
- Ricky Ford - tenor saxophone
- James Spaulding – alto saxophone, flute (tracks 1 2, 4 & 6)
- John Sass – tuba (tracks 1 2, 4 & 6)
- Kirk Lightsey – piano
- Cecil McBee – bass
- Freddie Waits – drums
