= Johnnie Garry =

American historian and road manager (1924–2018)

- Born: October 31, 1924; Charlotte, North Carolina, U.S.
- Died: March 13, 2018 (aged 93); Windsor Mill, Maryland, Windsor Hills Historic District, U.S.
- Occupation(s): Production Director, Producer, Road Manager (entertainment)

Johnnie Garry (October 31, 1924 – March 13, 2018) was an American entertainment director, producer, historian, nightclub manager, and road manager for Sarah Vaughan and Mary Lou Williams. He was the stage manager at the New York jazz club Birdland in the 1960s. He also worked as a stagehand, and as production coordinator and historian for Jazzmobile in New York City.

== Early life ==
Garry was born in Charlotte, North Carolina, United States. He was an only child. In 1928, his family moved to Harlem, where they lived near the Apollo Theater on 127th Street. Garry saw his first jazz show at the Apollo; it featured Don Redman and his orchestra. He was unable to finish high school because he needed to support his family, so he took a job in the Garment District.

== Career ==
Garry's career as a stagehand began at Cafe Society in Greenwich Village. Garry's neighbor, Josh White, recommended him to Barney Josephson, Cafe Society's founder and owner. Josephson employed him as a stagehand, and soon promoted him into the management side of the business, giving him the opportunity to learn about running a night club. This opened new doors for Garry. He met the road manager for pianist Mary Lou Williams, worked as a stagehand for artists including Lena Horne, Billie Holiday, and Eddie Heywood, and worked on Sarah Vaughan's management team for fifteen years, from 1945 to 1960.

In 1960, Garry began working at the jazz club Birdland and rose to the position of club manager. He was the first African-American manager of a major downtown New York City night club. During the 1960s, Garry also worked at Club Sahara, another New York City jazz club. He remained at Birdland until 1977.

In 1977, Garry was hired to work for Jazzmobile by Billy Taylor. He stayed at Jazzmobile until 2012, working as production coordinator, technical director, and historian. While at Jazzmobile, Garry's credits included production of the Philip Morris Super (Jazz) Band on Tour, an international touring festival, and Jazzmobile's free outdoor summer mobile concert series, held throughout the five boroughs of New York City. Garry worked as booking agent and road manager for the Bill Lockett Music Festivals and Jazz Cruises, and as stage manager for the Jazz Foundation of America's gala concerts.

During his career, Garry worked with many jazz artists, including Billy Taylor, Joe Williams, Nancy Wilson, B.B. King, Jimmy Heath, Clark Terry, Sarah Vaughan, Wycliffe Gordon, Carmen McRae, Wynton Marsalis, James Brown, Houston Person, Lou Donaldson, Jimmy Heath, Roy Hargrove, Dianne Reeves, Solomon Hicks, Randy Weston, Christian Sands, Frank Foster, Charenee Wade, Bobby Sanabria, Antoinette Montague, Monty Alexander, T. K. Blue, and Cedar Walton.

== Awards ==
2018: Jazzmobile's Jazzy Award (posthumously).
