= Future's Gold =

Studio album by Ricky Ford
- Released: 1983
- Recorded: February 9, 1983
- Studio: Van Gelder Studio, Englewood Cliffs, NJ
- Genre: Jazz
- Length: 36:38
- Label: Muse; MR 5296
- Producer: Michael Cuscuna

Ricky Ford chronology
Interpretations (1982)	Future's Gold (1983)	Shorter Ideas (1984)

Future's Gold is an album by saxophonist Ricky Ford which was recorded in 1983 and released on the Muse label.

== Reception ==
Professional ratings
Review scores
Source	Rating
AllMusic	4/5 stars

The AllMusic review by Scott Yanow stated "What makes this outing by tenor saxophonist Ricky Ford a bit different than his previous ones is that in addition to the fine trio, Larry Coryell is an important voice on the record, playing electric guitar on the first four songs and acoustic 12-string guitar on the remaining four tunes. Ford, a vastly underrated but talented tenorman, contributes six originals ... An excellent record, it is recommended both for the contributions of Ford and the surprisingly versatile Coryell".

== Track listing ==
All compositions by Ricky Ford except where noted

1. "A-Flat Now" – 4:39
2. "You Don't Know What Love Is" (Gene de Paul, Don Raye) – 5:56
3. "Samba de Caribe" – 4:30
4. "Goodbye, Pork Pie Hat" (Charles Mingus) – 3:15
5. "Future's Gold" – 3:55
6. "Knowledge" – 6:11
7. "Centenarian Waltz" – 4:45
8. "Hindsight and Necessity" – 4:31

== Personnel ==
- Ricky Ford - tenor saxophone
- Larry Coryell – electric guitar, twelve-string guitar
- Albert Dailey – piano
- Ray Drummond – bass
- Jimmy Cobb – drums
