= Bob Ojeda (musician) =

American jazz trumpeter (1941–2020)

Robert Ojeda
- Also known as: Bob Ojeda
- Born: September 1, 1941; Austin, Texas
- Died: March 26, 2020 (aged 78) Elmhurst, Illinois
- Genre: Jazz
- Instrument: Trumpet

Robert Ojeda (September 1, 1941 – March 26, 2020) was an American jazz trumpeter.

== Career ==
Ojeda grew up in Chicago, where he went to jazz clubs as a teenager. By the time he was 15, he and a friend were leading a neighborhood band, for which he was already orchestrating and arranging. At 18 he played in Stan Kenton's orchestra, and in the following years with Woody Herman, Buddy Rich, Ralph Marterie and Les Elgart. In the second half of the 1960s he was involved in recordings by Bunky Green, and Joe Morello in Chicago. He has also appeared on the TV shows The Tonight Show and The Midnight Special. In the following years he belonged to the Les Hooper Big Band. He has also worked with Hank Jones, Lionel Hampton, and The Manhattan Transfer. In 1975 he played with The Rolling Stones.

As a member of the Count Basie Orchestra, to which Ojeda belonged from 1985 to 2002, he accompanied the singer Caterina Valente in 1985–86. The Basie Band led by Frank Foster also recorded with Thad Jones, Diane Schuur, George Benson, Joe Williams, Lena Horne, Tito Puente, and Rosemary Clooney. Since 2013 he has been part of Petra van Nuis' Recession Seven. Furthermore, in his later years Ojada played with Grover Mitchell's New Blue Devils, Kenny Hing, Butch Miles, and vocalist Marc Pompe. In the field of jazz, according to Tom Lord, he was involved in 39 recording sessions between 1958 and 2014.

Ojeda worked as an arranger for Johnny Carson's The Tonight Show in the 1980s. He was not only active as a composer for big bands, but also wrote symphonic works that were performed in Dallas, Detroit and Indianapolis. He died at Elmhurst Hospital of complications following surgery in 2020.
