= Manhattan Blues =

Studio album by Ricky Ford
- Released: 1989
- Recorded: March 4, 1989
- Studio: A&R Studios, NYC
- Genre: Jazz
- Length: 59:59
- Label: Candid
- Producer: Mark Morganelli

Ricky Ford chronology
Hard Groovin' (1989)	Manhattan Blues (1989)	Ebony Rhapsody (1990)

Professional ratings
Review scores
Source	Rating
AllMusic	4.5/5 stars
Los Angeles Times	4/5 stars
The Penguin Guide to Jazz Recordings	3/4 stars

Manhattan Blues is an album by saxophonist Ricky Ford.

== Recording and music ==
Manhattan Blues was recorded on March 4, 1989, in New York City. It is a quartet recording, with leader Ricky Ford (tenor sax) joined by Jaki Byard (piano), Milt Hinton (bass), and Ben Riley (drums). Six of the nine tracks are Ford originals. The album was released on CD by Candid Records.

== Reception ==
The Los Angeles Times reviewer commented that Ford combined "modern and traditional values into a very appealing style". For AllMusic, Scott Yanow summarised it as "Stimulating music".

== Track listing ==
1. "In Walked Bud" (Thelonious Monk)
2. "Misty" (Erroll Garner, Johnny Burke)
3. "Ode to Crispus Attucks" (Ricky Ford)
4. "Portrait of Mingus" (Ford)
5. "Bop Nouveau" (Ford)
6. "My Little Strayhorn" (Ford)
7. "Manhattan Blues" (Ford)
8. "Land Preserved" (Ford)
9. "Half Nelson" (Miles Davis)

== Personnel ==
- Ricky Ford – tenor sax
- Jaki Byard – piano
- Milt Hinton – bass
- Ben Riley – drums
