= Playin' for Keeps (Bunky Green album) =

Studio album by Bunky Green
- Released: 1966
- Recorded: December 1965 and January 18, 1966
- Studio: Ter Mar Recording Studios, Chicago, IL
- Genre: Jazz
- Length: 35:05
- Label: Cadet; LP-766
- Producer: Esmond Edwards

Bunky Green chronology
Testifyin' Time (1965)	Playin' for Keeps (1966)	Soul in the Night (1966)

Playin' for Keeps is an album by saxophonist Bunky Green recorded in Chicago and released by the Cadet label in 1966.

== Reception ==
Professional ratings
Review scores
Source	Rating
AllMusic	3.5/5 stars

AllMusic reviewer Jason Ankeny stated "Playin' for Keeps draws on inspirations spanning from Tin Pan Alley to bossa nova to the British Invasion to forge a soul-jazz groove with its own distinct sensibility. Though rooted in bop, Bunky Green embraces both pop and avant-garde idioms as well, channeling his myriad influences to create a soulful and lithe sound with an impressive command of space and time".

== Track listing ==
1. "Playin' for Keeps" (Edith Green) – 4:17
2. "Yesterday" (John Lennon, Paul McCartney) – 3:39
3. "What Can I Do" (Bunky Green, Esmond Edwards) – 5:43
4. "Mi Compasion" (Edwards) – 4:09
5. "My Man's Gone Now" (George Gershwin, DuBose Heyward) – 3:51
6. "The Shadow of Your Smile" (Johnny Mandel, Paul Francis Webster) – 3:25
7. "Brazilano" (Manuel Garcia) – 5:29
8. "Mama Looka Boo Boo" (Fitzroy Alexander) – 4:32

== Personnel ==
- Bunky Green – alto saxophone
- Warren Kime, Paul Serrano – trumpet (tracks 6 & 8)
- John Avant – trombone (tracks 6 & 8)
- Kenny Soderblom – tenor saxophone (tracks 6 & 8)
- Willie Pickens (tracks 1–6 & 7), Charles Stepney (tracks 6 & 8) – piano
- Cleveland Eaton – bass
- Harold Jones (tracks 1–5 & 7), Marshall Thompson (tracks 6 & 8) – drums
- Eli Gutierrez – congas (tracks 6 & 8)
