= Tenor Madness Too! =

Studio album by Ricky Ford Quintet
- Released: 1992
- Recorded: August 12, 1992
- Studio: Van Gelder Studio, Englewood Cliffs, NJ
- Genre: Jazz
- Length: 51:16
- Label: Muse; MR 5478
- Producer: Don Sickler

Ricky Ford chronology
American-African Blues (1993)	Tenor Madness Too! (1992)	Tenors of Yusef Lateef & Ricky Ford (1994)

Tenor Madness Too! is an album by saxophonist Ricky Ford which was recorded in 1992 and released on the Muse label. The album title and cover reference the Sonny Rollins album Tenor Madness.

Professional ratings
Review scores
Source	Rating
AllMusic	3/5 stars

== Track listing ==
All compositions by Ricky Ford except where noted:

1. "Summer Summit" – 5:31
2. "Ballad de Jour" – 4:48
3. "Blues Abstractions" – 5:24
4. "Up a Step" (Hank Mobley) – 6:05
5. "Con Alma" (Dizzy Gillespie) – 7:04
6. "Soul Eyes" (Mal Waldron) – 6:12
7. "Rollin' and Strollin'" – 5:20
8. "I Got It Bad (and That Ain't Good)" (Duke Ellington, Paul Francis Webster) – 6:18
9. "Nigeria Blues" – 4:34

== Personnel ==
- Ricky Ford, Antoine Roney - tenor saxophone
- Donald Brown – piano
- Peter Washington – bass
- Louis Hayes – drums
