= Very R.A.R.E. =

Studio album by Elvin Jones
- Released: 1979
- Recorded: June 13, 14 & 20, 1979
- Studio: Van Gelder, Englewood Cliffs, New Jersey
- Genre: Jazz
- Length: 68:30
- Label: Trio (Japan); PAP 9173
- Producer: Elvin Jones

Elvin Jones chronology
Elvin Jones Jazz Machine Live in Japan Vol. 2 (1978)	Very R.A.R.E. (1979)	Soul Train (1980)

Very R.A.R.E. is an album by drummer Elvin Jones, recorded in 1979 and released on the Japanese Trio label.

== Reception ==
Professional ratings
Review scores
Source	Rating
AllMusic	2.5/5 stars
The Penguin Guide to Jazz Recordings	3/4 stars

The AllMusic review states, "This is first-rate quartet material with Pepper surging and the trio challenging him, then contrasting and complementing his solos with their own great work".

== Track listing ==
1. "Sweet Mama" (Gene Perla) - 3:55
2. "Passion Flower" (Billy Strayhorn) - 3:05
3. "Zange" (Keiko Jones) - 4:37
4. "Tin Tin Deo" (Gil Fuller, Dizzy Gillespie, Chano Pozo) - 5:14
5. "Pitter Pat" (Richard Davis) - 6:22
6. "The Witching Hour" (Roland Hanna) - 3:39

== Personnel ==
- Elvin Jones - drums
- Art Pepper - alto saxophone (tracks 1, 3, 4 & 6)
- Roland Hanna - piano (tracks 1–4 & 6)
- Richard Davis - bass
