= My Babe (album) =

Studio album by Bunky Green
- Released: 1965
- Recorded: October 28, 1960
- Studios: Ter Mar Recording Studios, Chicago, IL
- Genre: Jazz
- Length: 34:48
- Labels: Vee-Jay; VJLP-2509

Bunky Green chronology
My Babe (1965)	Testifyin' Time (1965)

My Babe is an album by saxophonist Bunky Green recorded in Chicago in 1960 but not released on the Vee-Jay label until 1965. It was also released on the label subsidiary Exodus Records in 1966.

== Reception ==
Professional ratings
Review scores
Source	Rating
AllMusic	4/5 stars
The Penguin Guide to Jazz Recordings	3/4 stars

Allmusic reviewer Jim Todd called it a "superior hard bop date" stating "Green's sound is distinguished by a finely controlled, soft articulation. It's not the squealing, serpentine legato of Eric Dolphy, but there are similarities. Green's approach allows him to play continuous streams of ideas rippled with the modulations of his subtle tonguing".

== Track listing ==
All compositions by Bunky Green, except where indicated.

1. "My Babe" (Traditional) – 6:32
2. "Polka Dots and Moonbeams" (Jimmy Van Heusen, Johnny Burke) – 4:53
3. "Counter Punch" – 4:12
4. "Step High" – 5:29
5. "Don't Blame Me" (Dorothy Fields, Jimmy McHugh) – 9:04
6. "Cecile" (Donald Byrd) – 04:38

== Personnel ==
- Bunky Green - alto saxophone
- Donald Byrd – trumpet
- Jimmy Heath – tenor saxophone
- Wynton Kelly – piano
- Larry Ridley – bass
- Jimmy Cobb – drums
