= July in Paris =

Live album by Jaki Byard
- Released: 1999
- Recorded: July 24–25, 1998
- Genre: Jazz
- Label: Fairplay

Professional ratings
Review scores
| Source | Rating |
|---|---|
| AllMusic | 4/5 stars |

July in Paris is an album by pianist Jaki Byard. Most of the tracks are trio, with bassist Ralph Hamperian, and drummer Richard Allen; on two they are joined by saxophonist Ricky Ford.

== Recording and music ==
The album was recorded in concert on July 24 and July 25, 1998. The tracks are diverse, with contrasts in material highlighted through the use of medleys. Pianist Jaki Byard plays with bassist Ralph Hamperian and drummer Richard Allen on all of the tracks; for the final two they are joined by tenor saxophonist Ricky Ford.

== Release ==
The French label Fairplay released the album in 1999. Some sources credit the release to Jazz Friends Productions. July in Paris is likely to be one of the final recordings of Byard's career – the pianist died in February 1999.

== Track listing ==
1. "After the Sun Disappears Xalithen Rose" – 7:36
2. "C'est Si Bon" – 2:48
3. "Lonely Woman, So What" – 7:01
4. "Nostradamus" – 2:46
5. "The High and the Mighty" – 10:23
6. "July in Paris" – 6:36
7. "Mimi" – 6:51
8. "Round Midnight/Well You Needn't/Stages/My Mother's Eyes" – 19:52

== Personnel ==
- Jaki Byard – piano
- Ralph Hamperian – bass
- Richard Allen – drums
- Ricky Ford – tenor sax
