= Poetry (album) =

Studio album by Stan Getz and Albert Dailey
- Released: 1984
- Recorded: January 12, 1983; Shadowbrook Studio, Irvington, New York by Jonathan Horwich
- Genre: Jazz
- Length: 42:46
- Label: Elektra/Musician; CJ 188
- Producer: Stan Getz

Stan Getz chronology
Stan Getz Quartet Live in Paris (1982)	Poetry (1984)	Line for Lyons (1983)

Poetry is a duo album by saxophonist Stan Getz and pianist Albert Dailey, which was recorded in 1983 and released on the Elektra/Musician label. It was reissued on CD on the Blue Note label in 2001.

== Reception ==
Professional ratings
Review scores
Source	Rating
Allmusic	4/5 stars

The AllMusic review by Scott Yanow stated: "This duet session is as much pianist Albert Dailey's date as Stan Getz's. Getz lets Dailey, who died a little over a year later, dominate the music and the lyrical pianist comes up with some fresh ideas during the standards set."

== Track listing ==
1. "Confirmation" (Charlie Parker) - 5:24
2. "A Child Is Born" (Thad Jones) - 5:19
3. "Tune Up" (Miles Davis) - 5:41
4. "Lover Man" (Jimmy Davis, Ram Ramirez, Jimmy Sherman) - 6:54
5. "A Night in Tunisia" (Dizzy Gillespie, Frank Paparelli) - 5:26
6. "Spring Can Really Hang You Up the Most" (Tommy Wolf, Fran Landesman) - 6:30
7. "'Round Midnight" (Thelonious Monk, Cootie Williams, Bernie Hanighen) - 7:32

== Personnel ==
- Stan Getz - tenor saxophone (tracks 1–3, 5 & 6)
- Albert Dailey - piano
