= Tenors of Yusef Lateef & Ricky Ford =

Studio album by Yusef Lateef and Ricky Ford
- Released: March 1996
- Recorded: Late 1994
- Studio: Guy Devito's Recording Studio, Shutesbury, MA
- Genre: Jazz
- Length: 71:34
- Label: YAL Records (YAL 105); Bomba Records
- Producer: Yusef Lateef

Yusef Lateef chronology
Metamorphosis ∞ (1996)	Tenors of Yusef Lateef & Ricky Ford (1996)	Yusef Lateef's Fantasia for Flute (1996)

Ricky Ford chronology
Tenor Madness Too! (1992)	Tenors of Yusef Lateef & Ricky Ford (1996)	Balaena (1999)

Tenors of Yusef Lateef & Ricky Ford is an album by saxophonists Yusef Lateef and Ricky Ford which was recorded in 1994 and released on the YAL label.

== Reception ==
Professional ratings
Review scores
Source	Rating
AllMusic	4.5/5 stars

The AllMusic review by Scott Yanow stated "Veteran tenors Yusef Lateef and Ricky Ford team up for this frequently explosive set. .. one's main focus is on the intense playing of the two great tenors, who battle it out in fiery fashion".

== Track listing ==
All compositions by Yusef Lateef

1. "Brother Moody" – 6:44
2. "Brother Turrentine" – 9:54
3. "IBN YL" – 12:25
4. "Brother Rollins" – 11:56
5. "Brother Heath" – 7:54
6. "Brother Shorter" – 7:14
7. "Brother Henderson" – 15:14

== Personnel ==
- Yusef Lateef – tenor saxophone
- Ricky Ford – tenor saxophone
- Avery Sharpe – electric bass
- Kamal Sabir – drums
