= Shorter Ideas =

Studio album by Ricky Ford
- Released: 1984
- Recorded: August 28, 1984
- Studio: Van Gelder Studio, Englewood Cliffs, NJ
- Genre: Jazz
- Length: 37:52
- Label: Muse; MR 5314
- Producer: Michael Cuscuna

Ricky Ford chronology
Future's Gold (1983)	Shorter Ideas (1984)	Looking Ahead (1986)

Shorter Ideas is an album by saxophonist Ricky Ford featuring four compositions by Wayne Shorter which was recorded in 1984 and released on the Muse label.

== Reception ==
Professional ratings
Review scores
Source	Rating
AllMusic	4.5/5 stars

The AllMusic review by Scott Yanow stated "Ford takes the lion's share of the solo space and is clearly up to the task, making these sometimes complex compositions seem accessible and logical. Ford has long been underrated (too old to be a Young Lion and too young to be an elder statesman), but based on the evidence of this recording alone he clearly deserves much greater acclaim".

== Track listing ==
All compositions by Ricky Ford except where noted

1. "Yes or No" (Wayne Shorter) – 5:36
2. "Miyako" (Shorter) – 4:45
3. "Dance Cadaverous" (Shorter) – 6:10
4. "Pinnochio" (Shorter) – 3:38
5. "Tabloid Blues" – 4:08
6. "Wolf Trap" – 5:06
7. "Happy Reunion" (Duke Ellington) – 4:15

== Personnel ==
- Ricky Ford - tenor saxophone, arranger
- James Spaulding – alto saxophone, flute
- Jimmy Knepper – trombone
- Kirk Lightsey – piano
- Rufus Reid – bass
- Jimmy Cobb – drums
