= Saxotic Stomp =

Studio album by Ricky Ford
- Released: 1988
- Recorded: September 4, 1987
- Studio: Van Gelder Studio, Englewood Cliffs, NJ
- Genre: Jazz
- Length: 49:02
- Label: Muse; MR 5349
- Producer: Don Sickler

Ricky Ford chronology
Looking Ahead (1986)	Saxotic Stomp (1988)	Hard Groovin' (1989)

Saxotic Stomp is an album by saxophonist Ricky Ford, recorded in 1987 and released on the Muse label.

== Reception ==
Professional ratings
Review scores
Source	Rating
AllMusic	4/5 stars
The Philadelphia Inquirer	3/4 stars

The AllMusic review by Scott Yanow stated, "This is one of tenor saxophonist Ricky Ford's finer Muse recordings, although all nine are recommended. ... Ford's arrangements, while giving everyone adequate solo space, keep the proceedings moving. Well worth several listens".

== Track listing ==
All compositions by Ricky Ford except where noted

1. "Saxotic Stomp" – 3:21
2. "Major Love" – 6:28
3. "Art Steps" – 6:09
4. "For Mary Lou" – 5:26
5. "Ben's Den" – 7:28
6. "Long Shadows" – 9:02
7. "Ba-Lue Bolivar Ba-Lues-Are" (Thelonious Monk) – 5:53

== Personnel ==
- Ricky Ford - tenor saxophone, arranger
- James Spaulding – alto saxophone, flute
- Charles Davis – baritone saxophone
- Kirk Lightsey – piano
- Ray Drummond – bass
- Jimmy Cobb – drums
