= Hard Groovin' =

Studio album by Ricky Ford
- Released: 1989
- Recorded: February 24, 1989
- Studio: Van Gelder Studio, Englewood Cliffs, NJ
- Genre: Jazz
- Length: 46:56
- Label: Muse; MR 5373
- Producer: Don Sickler

Ricky Ford chronology
Saxotic Stomp (1984)	Hard Groovin' (1989)	Manhattan Blues (1989)

Hard Groovin' is an album by saxophonist Ricky Ford which was recorded in 1989 and released on the Muse label.

== Reception ==
Professional ratings
Review scores
Source	Rating
AllMusic	3/5 stars

The AllMusic review by Scott Yanow stated "The consistent tenor-saxophonist Ricky Ford, who was often the youngest player on the bandstand when he first emerged in the late '70s, is easily the oldest musician on this energetic modern bop album. ... Ford (heard on both alto and tenor) is easily the most impressive solo voice on this high-quality outing. Ford and his quintet perform five of his originals, a Geoff Keezer song and the standards "Jitterbug Waltz" and "Minority" with driving swing and personable creativity".

== Track listing ==
All compositions by Ricky Ford except where noted

1. "Masaman" (Geoff Keezer) – 6:14
2. "Mr. C.P." – 5:45
3. "New Bop" – 6:15
4. "DD Blues" – 6:57
5. "Hard Groovin'" – 5:33
6. "Fundamental Mood" – 7:00
7. "Jitterbug Waltz" (Fats Waller) – 5:03
8. "Minority" (Gigi Gryce) – 4:23

== Personnel ==
- Ricky Ford - tenor saxophone, alto saxophone
- Roy Hargrove – trumpet
- Geoff Keezer – piano
- Robert Hurst – bass
- Jeff "Tain" Watts – drums
