= Soul in the Night =

Studio album by Sonny Stitt and Bunky Green
- Released: 1966
- Recorded: April 15, 1966
- Studio: Ter Mar Recording Studios, Chicago, IL
- Genre: Jazz
- Length: 32:54
- Label: Cadet; LP-770
- Producer: Esmond Edwards

Sonny Stitt chronology
The Boss Men (1965)	Soul in the Night (1966)	What's New!!! (1966)

Bunky Green chronology
Playin' for Keeps (1966)	Soul in the Night (1966)	The Latinization of Bunky Green (1967)

Soul in the Night is an album by saxophonists Sonny Stitt and Bunky Green recorded in Chicago in 1966 and released on the Cadet label.

== Reception ==
Professional ratings
Review scores
Source	Rating
AllMusic	3/5 stars

AllMusic reviewer Scott Yanow stated "Soul in the Night offered up Chicago's famous muscular jazz sound by two of its masters... Stitt and Green wrap their saxes around a tune, exploring gritty and fluid possibilities. The album's stereo version gives each player his own spotlight, as Stitt has one speaker and Green has the other to himself".

== Track listing ==
All compositions by Sonny Stitt, except where indicated.

1. "Soul in the Night" - 4:04
2. "It's Awfully Nice to Be With You" (Neil Hefti) - 3:44
3. "Hot Line" (Les Reed, Reg Tilsley) - 3:47
4. "Home Stretch" - 4:46
5. "The Spies" (Norman Harris) - 6:12
6. "One Alone" (Sigmund Romberg) - 5:46
7. "Sneakin' Up on You" (Ted Daryll, Chip Taylor) - 5:35

== Personnel ==
- Sonny Stitt – alto saxophone
- Bunky Green – alto saxophone
- Odell Brown – organ
- Bryce Roberson – guitar
- Maurice White – drums
