= Places We've Never Been =

Studio album by Bunky Green
- Released: 1979
- Recorded: February 21 & 22, 1979
- Studio: Vanguard 23rd Street Studio, New York City, NY
- Genre: Jazz
- Length: 43:35
- Label: Vanguard; VSD 79425
- Producer: Danny Weiss

Bunky Green chronology
Visions (1978)	Places We've Never Been (1979)	Discover Jazz (1982)

Places We've Never Been is an album by saxophonist Bunky Green. It was recorded in New York and released by the Vanguard label in 1979.

== Reception ==
Professional ratings
Review scores
Source	Rating
AllMusic	4.5/5 stars
DownBeat	4.5/5 stars

AllMusic reviewer Scott Yanow stated: "The strongest of Bunky Green's three Vanguard LPs of the mid- to late 1970s, this set finds him exploring six of his challenging yet fairly accessible originals. Green's appealing tone and adventurous style work well with the impressive all-star group, and he is in heard in prime form throughout the post-bop release".

DownBeat assigned the album 4 stars. Reviewer Sam Freedman wrote, "The album represents a departure for the Green known as a ferocious blower. Instead, he cools jazz in the manner of Miles Davis. He strips away many of the changes, turns down the volume, leaves plenty ol air between notes and solos, but keeps the rhythm section working overtime. This album is made for listening to at dusk, lying on a couch, not quite asleep".

== Track listing ==
All compositions by Bunky Green, except where indicated.

1. "East & West" – 8:30
2. "April Green" – 7:20
3. "Command Module" (Green, Ronald Kubelik) – 5:5
4. "Only In Seasons / Places We've Never Been" – 7:25
5. "Tension & Release" – 7:55
6. "Little Girl, I'll Miss You" – 4:03

== Personnel ==
- Bunky Green – alto saxophone, piano
- Randy Brecker – trumpet, flugelhorn
- Albert Dailey – piano (tracks 1–3 & 6)
- Eddie Gómez – bass
- Freddie Waits – drums
