= Eddie Higgins (album) =

Studio album by Eddie Higgins
- Released: 1961
- Recorded: November 18, 1960 and June 6, 1961
- Studio: Universal Recording, Chicago, IL
- Label: Vee-Jay; LP/SR 3017
- Producer: Sid McCoy

Eddie Higgins chronology
The Ed Higgins Trio (1957)	Eddie Higgins (1961)	Soulero (1962)

Eddie Higgins is an eponymous album by jazz pianist Eddie Higgins recorded in Chicago in 1960–61 and released by the Vee-Jay label.

Professional ratings
Review scores
Source	Rating
AllMusic	4/5 stars
The Penguin Guide to Jazz Recordings	3/4 stars

== Track listing ==
All compositions by Eddie Higgins except where noted

1. "Zarac, The Evil One" – 5:14
2. "Falling in Love With Love" (Richard Rodgers, Lorenz Hart) – 4:34
3. "You Leave Me Breathless" (Friedrich Hollaender) – 4:25
4. "AB's Blues" – 2:29
5. "Blues for Big Scotia" (Oscar Peterson) – 4:05
6. "Foot's Bag" – 7:12
7. "Satin Doll" (Duke Ellington, Billy Strayhorn, Johnny Mercer) – 4:19

== Personnel ==
- Eddie Higgins – piano
- Paul Serrano – trumpet (tracks 1, 3 & 6)
- Frank Foster – tenor saxophone (tracks 1, 3 & 6)
- Jim Atlas (tracks 1, 3 & 6), Richard Evans (tracks 2, 4, 5 & 7) – bass
- Marshall Thompson – drums
