= Stan Getz Quartet Live in Paris =

Live album by Stan Getz Quartet
- Released: April 1996
- Recorded: 1982; New Morning, Paris, France
- Genre: Jazz
- Length: 57:09
- Label: Dreyfus Jazz; FDM 36577-2

Stan Getz chronology
Pure Getz (1982)	Stan Getz Quartet Live in Paris (1996)	Poetry (1983)

Stan Getz Quartet Live in Paris is a live album by saxophonist Stan Getz which was recorded France in 1982 but not released on the French Dreyfus Jazz label until 1996.

== Reception ==
Professional ratings
Review scores
Source	Rating
Allmusic	4/5 stars
The Penguin Guide to Jazz Recordings	3.5/4 stars

The Allmusic site rated the album with 4 stars.

== Track listing ==
1. "O Grande Amor" (Antônio Carlos Jobim) - 6:04
2. "Blood Count" (Billy Strayhorn) - 5:02
3. "Airegin" (Sonny Rollins) - 8:28
4. "Blue Skies" (Irving Berlin) - 7:28
5. "On the Up and Up" (Jim McNeely) - 9:46
6. "I Wanted to Say" (Victor Lewis) - 10:15
7. "Tempus Fugit" (Bud Powell) - 10:06

== Personnel ==
- Stan Getz - tenor saxophone
- Jim McNeely - piano
- Marc Johnson - bass
- Victor Lewis - drums
