= Elvin Jones Music Machine =

Live album by Elvin Jones Music Machine
- Released: 1982
- Recorded: March 22, 23 & 24, 1978; The Educational Center for the Arts, New Haven, Connecticut
- Genre: Jazz
- Length: 38:39
- Label: Mark Levinson; 30PJ-8

Elvin Jones chronology
Remembrance (1978)	Elvin Jones Music Machine (1982)	Live in Japan 1978: Dear John C. (1978)

Elvin Jones Music Machine is a live album by drummer Elvin Jones recorded in 1978 and originally released on the audio manufacturer Mark Levinson label as an audiophile disc.

== Track listing ==
1. "Shi-Tsu-Mon" (Frank Foster) - 7:22
2. "Like Someone in Love" (Jimmy van Heusen, Johnny Burke) - 9:50
3. "Dealin'" (Gene Perla) - 12:54
4. "My One and Only Love" (Guy Wood, Robert Mellin) - 8:33

== Personnel ==
- Elvin Jones - drums
- Pat LaBarbera - tenor saxophone, soprano saxophone
- Frank Foster - tenor saxophone
- Roland Prince - guitar
- Andy McCloud - bass
