= Flying Colors (Ricky Ford album) =

Studio album by Ricky Ford
- Released: 1980
- Recorded: April 24, 1980
- Studio: Van Gelder Studio, Englewood Cliffs, NJ
- Genre: Jazz
- Length: 36:38
- Label: Muse; MR 5227
- Producer: Bob Porter

Ricky Ford chronology
| Manhattan Plaza (1979) | Flying Colors (1980) | Tenor for the Times (1981) |

Flying Colors is an album by saxophonist Ricky Ford which was recorded in 1980 and released on the Muse label.

== Reception ==
Professional ratings
Review scores
| Source | Rating |
|---|---|
| AllMusic | 4/5 stars |
| The Rolling Stone Jazz Record Guide | 5/5 stars |

The Rolling Stone Jazz Record Guide said: "Perhaps the best view of Ford the improviser is afforded on Flying Colors, a first-class program of music by Strayhorn, Ellington and Monk." The AllMusic review by Scott Yanow stated: "Ricky Ford was one of the top tenors to emerge during the '70s and early '80s. This Muse set finds him matched with a top-notch rhythm section ... It was a fine showcase for the up-and-coming tenor".

== Track listing ==
All compositions by Ricky Ford except where noted

1. "Jordanian Walk" – 8:26
2. "Chelsea Bridge" (Billy Strayhorn) – 4:25
3. "Take the Coltrane" (Duke Ellington) – 4:36
4. "Bye-Ya" (Thelonious Monk) – 5:45
5. "Olympic Glaze" – 4:55
6. "Portrait of Mingus" – 4:25
7. "Flying Colors" – 4:15

== Personnel ==
- Ricky Ford - tenor saxophone
- John Hicks – piano
- Walter Booker – bass
- Jimmy Cobb – drums
