= Hot Brass =

Studio album by Ricky Ford
- Released: 1992
- Recorded: April 30, 1991
- Studio: Nola Penthouse, NYC
- Genre: Jazz
- Length: 57:58
- Label: Candid; CCD 79518
- Producer: Mark Morganelli

Ricky Ford chronology
| Ebony Rhapsody (1990) | Hot Brass (1992) | American-African Blues (1993) |

Hot Brass is an album by saxophonist Ricky Ford, recorded in 1991 and released on the Candid label.

== Reception ==
Professional ratings
Review scores
| Source | Rating |
|---|---|
| AllMusic | 4.5/5 stars |
| The Penguin Guide to Jazz Recordings | 3.5/4 stars |

The Toronto Star wrote that Ford "heads a septet that plays with the furious power of a big band, often employing three- and four-part harmonies on his eight strong compositions." The AllMusic review by Ron Wynn stated: "Nice session matching tenor saxophone standout Ricky Ford with crew of fiery trumpet and trombone players ... Ford was a young lion back in the '70s, when there was no hype. He's now an experienced, skilled veteran."

== Track listing ==
All compositions by Ricky Ford except where noted

1. "Ford Variations" – 3:35
2. "Banging, Bashing, Bowing and Blowing" – 5:48
3. "A Night in Valencia" – 7:11
4. "11/15/91" – 5:50
5. "Cop Out" (Duke Ellington) – 3:33
6. "Hot Brass" – 8:16
7. "Mood Blues" – 7:25
8. "Speak Now" – 6:42
9. "Carbon 14" – 7:32
10. "It Don't Mean a Thing (If It Ain't Got That Swing)" (Ellington, Irving Mills) – 2:28

== Personnel ==
- Ricky Ford - tenor saxophone, alto saxophone
- Lew Soloff, Claudio Roditi – trumpet
- Steve Turre – trombone
- Danilo Pérez – piano
- Christian McBride – bass
- Carl Allen – drums
