= Roland Prince =

Roland Prince was an Antiguan jazz guitarist. He was born in St. John's on August 27, 1946. He died on July 15, 2016, aged 69.

== Discography ==
=== As leader ===
- 1976: Color Vision (with Virgil Jones, Frank Foster, Kenny Barron, Al Foster, Eddie Moore, Bob Cranshaw)
- 1977: Free Spirit

=== As sideman ===
With Johnny Hartman

- Today (Perception, 1972)

With Roy Haynes

- Senyah (Mainstream, 1972)

With Pat LaBarbera

- The Wizard (Dire, 1978)

With Billy Mitchell

- Now's the Time (Catalyst, 1976)

With David Murray

- Black & Black (Red Baron, 1991)

With Compost

- Life is Round (1973)

With Elvin Jones

- New Agenda (Vanguard, 1975)
- Mr. Thunder (EastWest, 1975)
- Summit Meeting (Vanguard, 1976) with James Moody, Clark Terry and Bunky Green
- Remembrance (MPS, 1978)
- Elvin Jones Music Machine (Mark Levinson, 1978)
- Live in Japan 1978: Dear John C. (Trio (Japan), 1978)
- Elvin Jones Jazz Machine Live in Japan Vol. 2 (Trio (Japan), 1978)

With Shirley Scott

- Lean on Me (Cadet, 1972)

with Buddy Terry

- Awareness (Mainstream, 1971)

With Larry Willis

- Inner Crisis (Groove Merchant, 1973)
