= Another Place (Bunky Green album) =

Studio album by Bunky Green
- Released: June 3, 2006
- Recorded: November 27–28, 2004
- Studio: Systems Two Recording Studio, Brooklyn, NY
- Genre: Jazz
- Length: 43:54
- Label: Label Bleu; LBLC 6676
- Producer: Steve Coleman

Bunky Green chronology
Healing the Pain (1990)	Another Place (2006)	The Salzau Quartet Live at Jazz Baltica (2008)

Another Place is an album by saxophonist Bunky Green recorded in Brooklyn and released by the French Label Bleu label in 2006.

== Reception ==
Professional ratings
Review scores
Source	Rating
All About Jazz	5/5 stars
The Guardian	4/5 stars
The Penguin Guide to Jazz Recordings	3.5/4 stars

All About Jazz reviewer Norman Weinstein stated: "This release is a welcome reminder that Bunky Green is alive and well—and one of the dozen most important alto sax players in the country ... With so much rightful praise given to players like Sonny Rollins and Ornette Coleman in their 70s, this album proves that yet another seventy-something giant is still wailing".

In The Guardian, John Fordham wrote: "For an alto-sax sound somewhere between Lee Konitz cool and Jackie McLean fire, a quirky sense of patterning, a hot-coloured tone palette and rhythmic imagination, Bunky Green deserves a stature closer to that of fellow-saxist Steve Coleman ... This distinctive session, organised by Coleman, places the maverick veteran in an open playing situation tailor-made for him - fronting a contemporary trio ... Green favours the winding, pattern-spinning solo, but in a jazzy freebop environment rather than an avant-funk one. Here is an independent talent taking a late step out of the shadows".

In JazzTimes Forest Dylan Bryant observed: "Steve Coleman has done a brilliant job of capturing the immediacy of Green’s statements and the electric interplay of his quartet ... Time and again the group surges forward from a position of thoughtful repose to one of intense activity. Green’s soaring high notes and densely tangled soliloquies seem to pull toward some dangerous precipice, only to glide back into pleasingly lyrical bop melodies. ... Green remains one of the most striking and engaging players on the scene, deserving of the stardom that has thus far eluded him."

== Track listing ==
All compositions by Bunky Green, except where indicated.

1. "It Could Happen to You" (Jimmy Van Heusen, Johnny Burke) – 6:47
2. "With All My Love" – 6:51
3. "Another Place" – 7:47
4. "Tune X" – 7:00
5. "Be" – 5:00
6. "Soul Eyes" (Mal Waldron) – 10:29

== Personnel ==
- Bunky Green - alto saxophone
- Jason Moran – piano
- Lonnie Plaxico – bass
- Nasheet Waits – drums
