= Testifyin' Time =

Studio album by Bunky Green
- Released: 1965
- Recorded: February 18, 1965
- Studio: Ter Mar Recording Studios, Chicago, IL
- Genre: Jazz
- Label: Argo; LP/LPS-753
- Producer: Esmond Edwards

Bunky Green chronology
My Babe (1965)	Testifyin' Time (1965)	Playin' for Keeps (1966)

Playin' for Keeps is an album by saxophonist Bunky Green recorded in Chicago and released by the Argo label in 1965.

== Reception ==
Professional ratings
Review scores
Source	Rating
AllMusic	4/5 stars

AllMusic reviewer Jason Ankeny stated: "As its title suggests, Testifyin' Time channels elements of gospel but otherwise eschews tradition and cliché, bolstering its modern jazz sensibilities with nods to the emerging Chicago soul sound. ... Bunky Green flourishes in the session's hip, contemporary mode, uncorking a series of nimble alto solos galvanized by a communal joie de vivre that elevates the entire session beyond the norm. And like most of Green's Argo sessions, Testifyin' Time boasts a thoughtful song selection as well".

== Track listing ==
1. "Testifyin' Time" (Edith Green) – 3:37
2. "Silver Dollar" (Jack Palmer, Clarke Van Ness) – 3:39
3. "Tamra" (Billy Wallace) – 4:17
4. "On Green Dolphin Street" (Bronisław Kaper, Ned Washington) – 5:21
5. "Tweedlee Dee" (Winfield Scott) – 4:21
6. "My Ship" (Kurt Weill, Ira Gershwin) – 4:03
7. "Orbit Six" (Edith Green) – 3:27
8. "When the Sun Comes Out" (Harold Arlen, Ted Koehler) – 4:31

== Personnel ==
- Bunky Green – alto saxophone
- James Meyer – tenor saxophone (tracks 1–3 & 5–8)
- Walter Strickland – trumpet (tracks 1–3 & 5–8)
- Billy Wallace – piano
- Cleveland Eaton – bass
- Marshall Thompson – drums
