= Interpretations (album) =

Studio album by Ricky Ford
- Released: 1982
- Recorded: February 22, 1982
- Studio: Van Gelder Studio, Englewood Cliffs, NJ
- Genre: Jazz
- Length: 37:52
- Label: Muse; MR 5275
- Producer: Bob Porter

Ricky Ford chronology
Tenor for the Times (1981)	Interpretations (1982)	Future's Gold (1983)

Interpretations is an album by saxophonist Ricky Ford which was recorded in 1982 and released on the Muse label.

== Reception ==
Professional ratings
Review scores
Source	Rating
AllMusic	4/5 stars
The Rolling Stone Jazz Record Guide	4/5 stars

The AllMusic review by Scott Yanow stated "Ricky Ford performs five originals in his "Opus" series (none of which caught on) during this enjoyable advanced hard bop LP. The music is straight-ahead but unpredictable".

== Track listing ==
All compositions by Ricky Ford except where noted

1. "Interpretations Opus 5" – 7:06
2. "Moon Mist" (Mercer Ellington) – 5:41
3. "Se AABBA" – 5:53
4. "Fix or Repair Daily" – 4:45
5. "Lady A" – 4:21
6. "Bostonova" – 5:06
7. "Dexter" – 5:00

== Personnel ==
- Ricky Ford - tenor saxophone
- Wallace Roney – trumpet (tracks 1, 3 & 4)
- Robert Watson – alto saxophone (tracks 1, 3 & 4)
- John Hicks – piano
- Walter Booker – bass
- Jimmy Cobb – drums
