= Madeline Tourtelot =

Film maker, film critic (1915–2002)

- Born: Madeline Hanson; November 21, 1915; Alameda, California
- Died: May 26, 2002 (aged 86)
- Other name: Madeline Tripp
- Education: Art Institute of Chicago; Illinois Institute of Design
- Alma mater: Smith College; Northwestern University
- Occupations: Filmmaker, painter, educator, film critic
- Years active: 1940s–1980s
- Known for: Harry Partch collaborations Founder, Peninsula School of Art
- Spouse(s): Edward Tourtelot (1934–83); Takashi Yamada
- Children: Edward Jr. (b. 1936); Joan (b. 1938)
- Parent(s): Madeline and Chester Tripp (adoptive)

Madeline Tourtelot (21 November 1915 – 26 May 2002) was an American filmmaker based out of the Chicago metropolitan area. Known for her avant-garde filmmaking style and interest in musical subjects, Tourtelot was a prominent female figure in the Chicago filmmaking community in the 1950s and 60s. She collaborated on films with notable artists such as John Steinbeck, Emilio Fernández, Harry Partch, Paul Severson and Edward Bland. Tourtelot founded three artist institutions in the Midwestern United States, and is included in the permanent collection of the Art Institute of Chicago. Tourtelot also studied journalism and worked as a film critic, and a painter, jeweler, photographer, sculptor and printmaker.

== Biography ==
Born in Alameda, California as Madeline Hanson, Tourtelot moved to Evanston, Illinois, as a young child. Tourtelot grew up in a musical family (her adoptive father was a classical pianist) and was drawn to the arts at an early age. Her close proximity to the galleries and museums in Chicago led her to pursue post-secondary studies in fine art. She eventually studied at a number of institutions around the Midwestern United States, including Smith College, Fish Creek Art Colony (where she studied painting under Vladimir Rousseff), Northwestern University, the School of the Art Institute of Chicago, the Illinois Institute of Design, and the Saugatuck Summer School of Painting. Tourtelot married wealthy Chicago architect Edward Tourtelot in 1935 at the age of 19. Edward Tourtelot helped to finance the openings of several art schools and galleries with Madeline. The couple had two children: Edward Jr. (1936) and Joan (1938). Tourtelot died on May 26, 2002.

== Career ==
Tourtelot's met John Steinbeck and Emilio Fernández in 1947 while studying painting in Mexico. Steinbeck and Fernandez were working on the film version of Steinbeck's 1947 novel "The Pearl" and invited Tourtelot to help with production. Her experience with Steinbeck and Fernandez inspired the start to her career as a filmmaker.

Tourtelot went on to become a significant contributor to Chicago's art scene and avant-garde filmmaking in the 1950s and 1960. She completed two films; Reflections and One by One (featuring music by Ed Bland) in 1955, as well as a series of short commissioned films set to classical music for Chicago's Educational channel in 1956.

In 1957, Tourtelot met American composer Harry Partch through Robert Kostka, who was the art director at WTTW-TV in Chicago. Partch needed a filmmaker for a script he'd rewritten called U.S. Highball, and Kostka thought Tourtelot's filmmaking aesthetic would be in line with Partch's vision for the film. In 1958, she produced Windsong with Partch, the first of a number of collaborations between the two and the only film in which she acted. Other works include Rhythm on Canvas (1955), Reflections (1955), One by One (1955), and U.S. Highball (1968). Tourtelot also collaborated with Chicago jazz musician Paul Severson on The Poet's Return (1962) and Two Cats- One Chick (1962).

In addition to her visual arts practice, Tourtelot founded three art institutions: the Ephraim Art School (1943), the Gallery Studio in Chicago's North Michigan Avenue arts district (1950s), and the Door Harbor School of Art (1965), now known as the Peninsula School of Art, where she was the school's director until 1971. Tourtelot donated part of her land, including two barns, to Peninsula Art Association in 1978. The school's archives include some of Tourtelot's original films, paintings, and photographs. Prior to working in film, Tourtelot was active in the fields of photography, printmaking, and painting. Her painting Escape is in the permanent collection of the Art Institute of Chicago. She was also a long-standing member of Cinema 16, an influential membership film society in New York City, and a critic for Films in Review and Chicago American, in which her writing often revealed her own aesthetic preferences.

== Major works ==
=== Windsong ===
One of Tourtelot's most well-known works, Windsong, was produced in 1958. The work starred Tourtelot and artist Rudolph Seno, who at the time was a sculpture student at the Art Institute of Chicago's Saugatauk Summer school, where Tourtelot was working. The film consists of playful shots that Seno and Tourtelot captured of one another on the sand dunes of Lake Michigan's southeastern shore, along with shots of local botanical specimen and water. The score for Windsong was written by Harry Partch, who played 10 different instruments for the film. He was inspired by the playful imagery of Tourtelot and Seno, which reminded him of the legend of Apollo and Daphne.

=== Delusion of the Fury ===
Film based on the stage play by Harry Partch, subtitled A Ritual of Dream and Delusion.

== Selected filmography ==
Film title	year	collaborators
Rhythm on Canvas	1955	unknown
Reflections	1955	Edward Bland (music)
One by One	1955	unknown
Windsong	1958	Harry Partch (music), Rudolph Seno (actor)
Music Studio Harry Partch	1958	Harry Partch (music)
Rotate the Body	1961	Harry Partch (music)
The Poets Return	1962	Paul Severson (music)
Two Cats- One Chick	1962	Paul Severson (music)
U.S. Highball	1968	Harry Partch (music)
