= Tenor for the Times =

Studio album by Ricky Ford
- Released: 1981
- Recorded: April 6 and July 1, 1981
- Studio: Van Gelder Studio, Englewood Cliffs, NJ
- Genre: Jazz
- Length: 36:38
- Label: Muse; MR 5250
- Producer: Bob Porter

Ricky Ford chronology
Flying Colors (1980)	Tenor for the Times (1981)	Interpretations (1982)

Tenor for the Times is an album by saxophonist Ricky Ford which was recorded in 1981 and released on the Muse label.

== Reception ==
Professional ratings
Review scores
Source	Rating
AllMusic	4.5/5 stars
The Rolling Stone Jazz Record Guide	3/5 stars

The AllMusic review by Scott Yanow stated " Ford investigates seven of his diverse originals, really digging into the material. It's a good introduction to his talents".

== Track listing ==
All compositions by Ricky Ford except where noted

1. "This Our Love (Esse Nosso Amor)" – 7:30
2. "Christmas Cheer" – 7:08
3. "Hour Samba" – 7:29
4. "Saxaceous Serenade" – 5:04
5. "Portrait of Love" – 5:14
6. "Orb" – 4:31
7. "Arcadian Eclipse" – 5:14

== Personnel ==
- Ricky Ford - tenor saxophone
- Jack Walrath – trumpet (track 2)
- Albert Dailey – piano
- Rufus Reid – bass
- Jimmy Cobb – drums
