= Remembrance (Elvin Jones album) =

Studio album by Elvin Jones
- Released: 1978
- Recorded: February 3, 4 & 5, 1978
- Studio: Tonstudio Zuckerfabrik, Stuttgart
- Genre: Jazz
- Label: MPS
- Producer: Joachim-Ernst Berendt

Elvin Jones chronology
| Time Capsule (1977) | Remembrance (1978) | Elvin Jones Music Machine (1978) |

Remembrance is an album from jazz drummer Elvin Jones, recorded on February 3, 4 and 5, 1978, and released on MPS Records in 1978.

== Critical reception ==
Professional ratings
Review scores
| Source | Rating |
|---|---|
| AllMusic | 4/5 stars |
| The Rolling Stone Jazz Record Guide | 4/5 stars |
| DownBeat | 4/5 stars |

The Globe and Mail noted that "what Remembrance lacks is energy and originality, and to the extent that Jones is in charge of stoking the band's fire and choosing its musical direction (he's still stuck in the mid-sixties), it's Jones' responsibility."

== Track listing ==
All songs written by Pat LaBarbera, except where noted

Side one

1. "Giraffe" (Don Garcia) – 7:54
2. "Section 8" – 4:25
3. "Little Lady" – 6:27
4. "Familiar Ground" – 3:32

Side two

1. "Kalima" (Michael Stuart) – 8:30
2. "Beatrice" (Andy McCloud III) – 6:41
3. "Remembrance" – 7:04

== Personnel ==
- drums - Elvin Jones
- tenor saxophone and soprano - Pat LaBarbera
- tenor saxophone and soprano - Michael Stuart
- guitar - Roland Prince
- bass - Andy McCloud III
- producer - Joachim-Ernst Berendt
- engineer - Gibbs Platen
