= Elvin Jones Jazz Machine Live in Japan Vol. 2 =

Live album by Elvin Jones' Jazz Machine
- Released: 1978
- Recorded: April 8–9, 1978
- Venue: Yomiuri Hall, Yūrakuchō, Tokyo
- Genre: Jazz
- Length: 52:37
- Label: Trio (Japan); PAP 9200
- Producer: Kaz Harada and Ken Inaoka

Elvin Jones chronology
Live in Japan 1978: Dear John C. (1978)	Elvin Jones Jazz Machine Live in Japan Vol. 2 (1978)	Very R.A.R.E. (1979)

Elvin Jones Jazz Machine Live in Japan Vol. 2 is a live album by drummer Elvin Jones' Jazz Machine recorded in Japan in 1978 and originally released on the Japanese Trio label.

== Track listing ==
1. "Keiko's Birthday March" (Elvin Jones) - 15:28
2. "Bessie's Blues" (John Coltrane) - 4:37
3. "Antigua" (Roland Prince) - 15:38
4. "E.J. Blues" (Jones) - 6:50

== Personnel ==
- Elvin Jones - drums
- Pat LaBarbera - tenor saxophone
- Frank Foster - tenor saxophone, soprano saxophone
- Roland Prince - guitar
- Andy McCloud - bass
