= Live in Japan 1978: Dear John C. =

Live album by Elvin Jones' Jazz Machine
- Released: 1978
- Recorded: April 8–9, 1978
- Venue: Yomiuri Hall, Yūrakuchō, Tokyo
- Genre: Jazz
- Length: 52:37
- Label: Trio (Japan); PAP 9111
- Producer: Kaz Harada and Ken Inaoka

Elvin Jones chronology
Elvin Jones Music Machine (1978)	Live in Japan 1978: Dear John C. (1978)	Elvin Jones Jazz Machine Live in Japan Vol. 2 (1978)

Professional ratings
Review scores
Source	Rating
Allmusic	4/5 stars

Live in Japan 1978: Dear John C. is a live album by drummer Elvin Jones' Jazz Machine recorded in Japan in 1978 and originally released on the Japanese Trio label.

== Reception ==
The Allmusic review states "The music is a direct outgrowth of drummer Elvin Jones' days with Coltrane. Bassist Andy McCloud is steady and supportive throughout while guitarist Roland Prince supplies a chordal base for the tenors. The musicians stretch themselves within the boundaries of Coltrane's music".

== Track listing ==
1. "E. J.'s Blues" (Elvin Jones) - 15:27
2. "House That Love Built" (Frank Foster) - 10:25
3. "A Love Supreme: Part 1: Acknowledgement/Part 2: Resolution" (John Coltrane) - 26:45

== Personnel ==
- Elvin Jones - drums
- Pat LaBarbera - tenor saxophone
- Frank Foster - tenor saxophone, soprano saxophone
- Roland Prince - guitar
- Andy McCloud - bass
