= That Old Feeling (Albert Dailey album) =

Studio album by Albert Dailey Trio
- Released: 1979
- Recorded: July 13, 1978
- Genre: Jazz
- Length: 55:11
- Label: SteepleChase; SCS-1107
- Producer: Nils Winther

Albert Dailey chronology
Renaissance (1977)	That Old Feeling (1979)	Textures (1981)

That Old Feeling is the third album led by pianist Albert Dailey which was recorded in 1978 and released on the SteepleChase label.

Professional ratings
Review scores
Source	Rating
AllMusic	3/5 stars
The Penguin Guide to Jazz Recordings	3/4 stars

== Track listing ==
1. "Music That Makes Me Dance" (Jule Styne) – 7:47
2. "Lover Man" (Jimmy Davis, Roger "Ram" Ramirez, James Sherman) – 4:39
3. "Yesterdays" (Jerome Kern, Otto Harbach) – 10:48
4. "Michelle" (John Lennon, Paul McCartney) – 5:23
5. "That Old Feeling" (Sammy Fain, Lew Brown) – 11:33
6. "Body and Soul" (Johnny Green, Frank Eyton, Edward Heyman, Robert Sour) – 6:53
7. "Night and Day" (Cole Porter) – 8:05 additional track on CD release

== Personnel ==
- Albert Dailey – piano
- Buster Williams – bass
- Billy Hart – drums
