= Pat LaBarbera =

American jazz saxophonist, clarinetist, and flautist

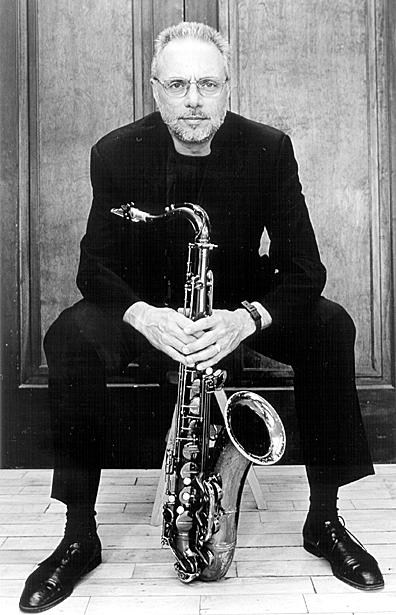

Background information
- Born: Pat LaBarbera; April 7, 1944 (age 82); Mt. Morris, New York
- Genres: Jazz
- Occupations: Musician, educator
- Instruments: Tenor saxophone, Soprano saxophone, Clarinet, Flute

Pat (Pascel Emmanuel) LaBarbera (born April 7, 1944) is an American-born Canadian jazz tenor, alto and soprano saxophonist, clarinetist, and flautist born in Mt. Morris, New York, most notable for his work as a soloist in Buddy Rich bands from 1967 to 1973.

He moved to Toronto, Ontario in 1974, and is a member of the faculty at Humber College. La Barbera began working with Elvin Jones in 1975, touring Europe with him in 1979. While working with Buddy Rich, Pat also was working in groups led by Woody Herman and Louie Bellson. Pat has also played with Carlos Santana. LaBarbera has played a major role in the development of a generation of Canadian saxophonists. In 2000, he won a Juno Award for Best Traditional Instrumental Jazz Album for Deep in a Dream.

Pat is the brother of fellow musicians John LaBarbera (trumpet) and Joe LaBarbera (drums).

== Discography ==
=== As a leader ===
- 1975: Pass It On (PM)
- 1978: The Wizard
- 1979: The Meeting
- 1981: Necessary Evil
- 1987: Virgo Dance
- 1997: Standard Transmission (GOWI Records) with John Abercrombie, Jacek Kochan, Jim Vivian
- 2001: From the Heart
- 2002: Deep In A Dream
- 2005: Crossing the Line
- 2016: Silent Voices
- 2018: Trane of Thought (with Kirk MacDonald)

=== As sideman ===
With Buddy Rich

- The New One 1967
- Mercy, Mercy 1968
- Buddy and Soul 1969
- Keep the Customer Satisfied 1970
- A Different Drummer 1971
- Stick It 1972
- Rich in London 1972
- Roar of '74 1973

With Elvin Jones

- The Main Force (Vanguard, 1976)
- Remembrance (MPS, 1978)
- Elvin Jones Music Machine (Mark Levison, 1978)
- Live in Japan 1978: Dear John C. (Trio (Japan), 1978)
- Elvin Jones Jazz Machine Live in Japan Vol. 2 (Trio (Japan), 1978)
- Brother John (Palo Alto, 1982)
- Live at the Village Vanguard Volume One (Landmark, 1984)
- Elvin Jones Jazz Machine Live at Pit Inn (Polydor (Japan), 1985)

With others

- Dave McMurdo Jazz Orchestra 1989 (Canada)
- Denny Christianson and Jan Jarczyk, Goin' Places 2000 (Canada)
- John LaBarbera Big Band, On the Wild Side 2003 (2004 Grammy Nominee)
- John LaBarbera Big Band, "Phantasm" 2005
