= Paul Severson =

- Born: Paul Severson; August 18, 1928; U.S.
- Died: May 20, 2007 (aged 78) Cedaredge, Colorado, U.S.
- Genres: Jazz
- Occupations: Composer, arranger, trombonist
- Years active: 1949–2007
- Labels: Academy, Replica, Omegatape, Altair, Eva Tone, GRS West

Paul Severson (August 18, 1928 – May 20, 2007) was an American music arranger and composer who wrote some of the most recognizable commercial music of our time. While he may be best known for the Doublemint gum jingle and compositions for Marlboro, Ford, McDonald's, Kellogg's, KFC & Chicken of the Sea, his jazz work in "The Cry of Jazz" is preserved in the Library of Congress' National Film Registry and his Hal Leonard arrangements of Dixieland titles are played by people worldwide. During his long career he received 15 Clio Awards. Severson has been called "one of the most famous arrangers/composers you've never heard of".

== Early life and career ==
Severson, a 1946 graduate of Fargo Central High School, settled in Chicago after obtaining a master's degree in music from Northwestern University. He performed with the Chicago Symphony Orchestra and composed for a number of top advertising agencies.

Wherever he went Severson was involved in writing music. As a performer, he played trombone or keyboards with various bands and orchestras in the 1950s and 1960s, including the CBS Chicago Staff Orchestra, the Stan Kenton Orchestra and the Chicago Civic Symphony. Severson also performed with jazz musicians such as Dizzy Gillespie, Louis Armstrong, Ella Fitzgerald and Stan Getz as well as created film scores for director Madeline Tourtelot (The Poet's Return & Two Cats- One Chick 1962).

Through the 1980s and 1990s Paul Severson was head of the Minnesota State University of Moorhead's music industry program .

== Later career ==
Back in Fargo in later years Paul Severson helped found several local jazz groups, arranged compositions for the Red River Dance and Performing Co. and served as music director for Trollwood Performing Arts School. All along, he mentored, encouraged and enlightened.

Severson composed music for a number of national commercials in the early 1990s.

Bill Robinson, who headed the Mesa State Theater department from 1960 to 1988, also had an opportunity to work with Severson. Severson composed the music for the musical Princess, which Robinson produced. "He was quite a jazz man," Robinson said. "He was a very sweet man, truly a gentleman.".

Severson was a moderator and lay minister of two Unitarian Universalist fellowships in Grand Junction and in Fargo, North Dakota. His spiritual search led him to study eastern religions, Native American spirituality, science, philosophy and mysticism. After four years of study, he became a Church of Religious Science practitioner.

== Death ==
Paul Severson died on May 20, 2007, after a long struggle with prostate cancer.

== Discography ==
Title	Artist	Label	Year
Jingle Bells/ Buffy the Jingle Bell Man	Dreamdusters & Paul Severson Quartet	Custom Sound	1953
When You Comin' Baby/Wildcat Stomp	Jimmy Reid & Paul Severson Quartet	Academy	1955
Academy Records presents the Paul Severson Quartet	Paul Severson Quartet	Academy	1956
Sounds... Crazy	Paul Severson Quartet	Omegatape	1956
Jazz	Paul Severson Septet	Replica	1957
Misty Island/Please Love Me	Paul Severson Orchestra	Altair	1957
Lullabies	Connie Mitchel, Billy Leach & Paul Severson Ensemble	Eva Tone	1958
Your Heart's In the Wrong Place/Hot Dog Polka	Len Dresslar & Paul Severson Orchestra	Academy	1959
Music of the West Orchestral Suites Disk 1	Gary Smith & Paul Severson	GRS West	2007
Orchestral Disk 2	Gary Smith & Paul Severson	GRS West	2007
Orchestral Disk 3	Gary Smith & Paul Severson	GRS West	2007
Pastoral and Electoral Disk 1	Gary Smith & Paul Severson	GRS West	2007
Jazz Disk 1	Gary Smith & Paul Severson	GRS West	2007
Jazz Disk 2	Gary Smith & Paul Severson	GRS West	2007
The Paul Severson Quartette featuring Kenny Soderblom	Paul Severson Quartette ft Kenny Soderblom	GRS West	2007
Transparent to the Light	Paul Severson	Self-released	2008
Midwest Jazz + Jazz Young Blood	Paul Severson & Chuz Alfred	Fresh Sounds	2022

As Sideman (trombone):

With Ralph Marterie

- 1949 Sweet and Lovely- With Strings
- 1951 Dance Band in Town
- 1952 Dancing on the Downbeat
- 1953 Pennsylvania Turnpike
- 1954 Alone Together Music for Smoochin
- 1955 Salute to the Aragon Ballroom
- 1955 Hits That Made Him Famous
- 1959 Marvelous Marterie

With Stan Kenton

- 1953 By Request Vol. 5
- 1953. The Creep/Tenderly

With The Four Freshmen

- 1953 Tenderly/I'll Be Seeing You

With Hal Kartun

- 1955 WBBM Live Showmanship

With Bill Russo

- 1956 The World of Alcina

With David Carroll

- 1960 Solo Encores
- 1960 Latin Percussion

With Tony Marterie/ Tony Martell

- 1961 Jungle Drums/April & The Winds
- 1962. Play For You
- 1963 Folk Tunes Swingin’ Band Style
