= Shakatak Live in Japan =

Live in Japan

Live album by Shakatak
- Released: April 1984
- Recorded: 15 December 1983
- Venues: Nakano Sun Plaza Hall (Nakano, Tokyo, Japan)
- Genres: Jazz-funk, crossover
- Length: 1:28:45
- Label: Polydor
- Producer: Nigel Wright

Live in Japan is a live double album by English jazz-funk band Shakatak. It was recorded at the Nakano Sun Plaza Hall during the 1983 Japan tour, and originally released only in that country.

== Track listing and format ==
- LP: Polydor 38MM 0344/5
- Double gatefold album with lyric insert.
- Side One
1. "Introduction" (William "Bill" Sharpe) – 2.21*
2. "Dark Is The Night" (Sharpe, Roger Odell) – 4.09*
3. "Don't Say That Again" (Keith Winter) – 4:37
4. "Street Walkin'" (Sharpe, Odell) – 5.43*
- Side Two
1. "Sanur" (Sharpe) – 5:11
2. "Slip Away" (Sharpe, Odell) – 4:57
3. "Invitations" (Sharpe, Odell) – 6.34
4. "Out of This World" (Sharpe, Odell) – 8:13
- Side Three
1. "Piano Solo" (Sharpe, Odell) – 7:11
2. "Bass Solo" (George Anderson) – 5.03
3. "On Nights Like Tonight" (Sharpe, Odell) – 5:09
4. "Let's Get Together" (Sharpe, Odell) – 4.36*
- Side Four
1. "Bitch to the Boys" (Sharpe, Odell) – 5.12
2. "Easier Said Than Done" (Sharpe, Odell) – 5.16*
3. "Night Birds" (Sharpe, Odell) – 7.16*
- Tracks marked with * were also included in the Shakatak Live! CD, released in 1985.
- Recorded 15 December 1983 Nakano Sun Plaza Hall, Nakano, Tokyo, Japan
- Mixed at Rock City Studios, Shepperton, England

== Personnel ==
Shakatak

- Bill Sharpe – keyboards
- Keith Winter – guitar
- George Anderson – bass
- Roger Odell – drums
- Jill Saward – vocals, percussion
- Norma Lewis – vocals

Guest musician

- Ginji Sawai – saxophone

== Production ==
- Produced by Nigel Wright
- Executive producer: Les McCutcheon
- Engineer: Nick Smith
