= Bunky Green =

American jazz saxophonist (1933–2025)

- Birth name: Vernice Green Jr
- Born: April 23, 1933; Milwaukee, Wisconsin, U.S.
- Died: March 1, 2025 (aged 91); Jacksonville, Florida, U.S.
- Genres: Jazz
- Occupations: Musician; educator
- Instrument: Alto saxophone
- Years active: 1940s–1980s
- Labels: Exodus; Argo; Vanguard; Delos; Pi; Label Bleu

Vernice "Bunky" Green Jr (April 23, 1933 – March 1, 2025) was an American jazz alto saxophonist and educator.

== Life and career ==
Green was raised in Milwaukee, Wisconsin, where he played the alto saxophone, mainly at a local club called "The Brass Rail".

Green's first break came when he was hired in New York City by Charles Mingus as a replacement for Jackie McLean in the 1950s. His brief stint with the bass player and composer made a deep impression. Mingus' sparing use of notation and his belief that there was no such thing as a wrong note had a lasting influence on Green's own style.

Green moved to Chicago, Illinois, where he performed with players such as Sonny Stitt, Louie Bellson, Andrew Hill, Yusef Lateef, and Ira Sullivan. Originally strongly influenced by Charlie Parker, Green spent a period reassessing his style and studying, emerging with a highly distinctive sound that has deeply influenced a number of younger saxophonists, including Steve Coleman and Greg Osby.

Green gradually withdrew from the public eye to develop a career as a jazz educator. He taught at Chicago State University from 1972–1989, and in the 1990s took up the directorship of the jazz studies program at the University of North Florida in Jacksonville, where he taught and acted as chair of Jazz Studies until his retirement in 2011. He also served a term as the president of the International Association for Jazz Education and was elected to the Jazz Education Hall of Fame.

Green recorded several albums during the 1960s, including Step High (featuring Wynton Kelly and Jimmy Cobb), Playing for Keeps, and Soul in the Night (which paired Green with Sonny Stitt). In addition to a handful of records as a leader on the Vanguard label during the 1970s, he also recorded several albums with Elvin Jones, including Summit Meeting and Time Capsule. His 1989 session on the Delos label, Healing the Pain, commemorates the death of his parents and was awarded the coveted 5-star rating from DownBeat magazine. Green's studio album, Another Place (which features the rhythm section of Jason Moran, Lonnie Plaxico, and Nasheet Waits), also received a 5-star review from Down Beat. In July 2008, his recording The Salzau Quartet Live at Jazz Baltica was released.

Green died on March 1, 2025 in Jacksonville, Florida, at the age of 91.

== Discography ==
=== As leader/co-leader ===
- My Babe (Vee-Jay, 1965) – recorded in 1960
- Testifyin' Time (Argo, 1965)
- Playin' for Keeps (Cadet, 1966)
- Soul in the Night with Sonny Stitt (Cadet, 1966)
- The Latinization of Bunky Green (Cadet, 1967) – recorded in 1966
- Transformations (Vanguard, 1977) – recorded in 1976
- Summit Meeting with Elvin Jones, James Moody, Clark Terry, and Roland Prince (Vanguard, 1977)
- Visions (Vanguard, 1978)
- Places We've Never Been (Vanguard, 1979)
- Discover Jazz – Live! at the 1982 NAJE Convention with Willie Thomas (Mark, 1982)
- In Love Again with Willie Thomas (Mark, 1987)
- Healing the Pain (Delos, 1990)
- Another Place (Label Bleu, 2006)
- The Salzau Quartet Live at Jazz Baltica (Traumton, 2008)
- Apex with Rudresh Mahanthappa (Pi, 2010)

=== As sideman ===
With Fontella Bass

- "You'll Miss Me (When I'm Gone)" / "Don't Jump" with Bobby McClure (Checker, 1965)
- "Safe and Sound" (Checker, 1966)
- "Recovery" / "Leave It in the Hands of Love" (Checker, 1966)
- "I Can't Rest" / "Surrender" (Checker, 1966)
- The New Look (Checker, 1966)

With others

- Eddie Harris, Lost Album Plus the Better Half (Vee-Jay, 1995) – recorded in 1962
- Elvin Jones, Time Capsule (Vanguard, 1977)
- Herb Lance, The Comeback (Chess, 1966)
- Ben Sidran, Don't Let Go (Blue Thumb, 1974)
- Travis Shook, Travis Shook (Columbia, 1993)
- The Soulful Strings, Groovin' with the Soulful Strings (Cadet, 1967)
- Billy Stewart, Summertime (Chess, 1966)
- Clark Terry, Having Fun (Delos, 1990)
