= Ricky Ford =

American jazz musician

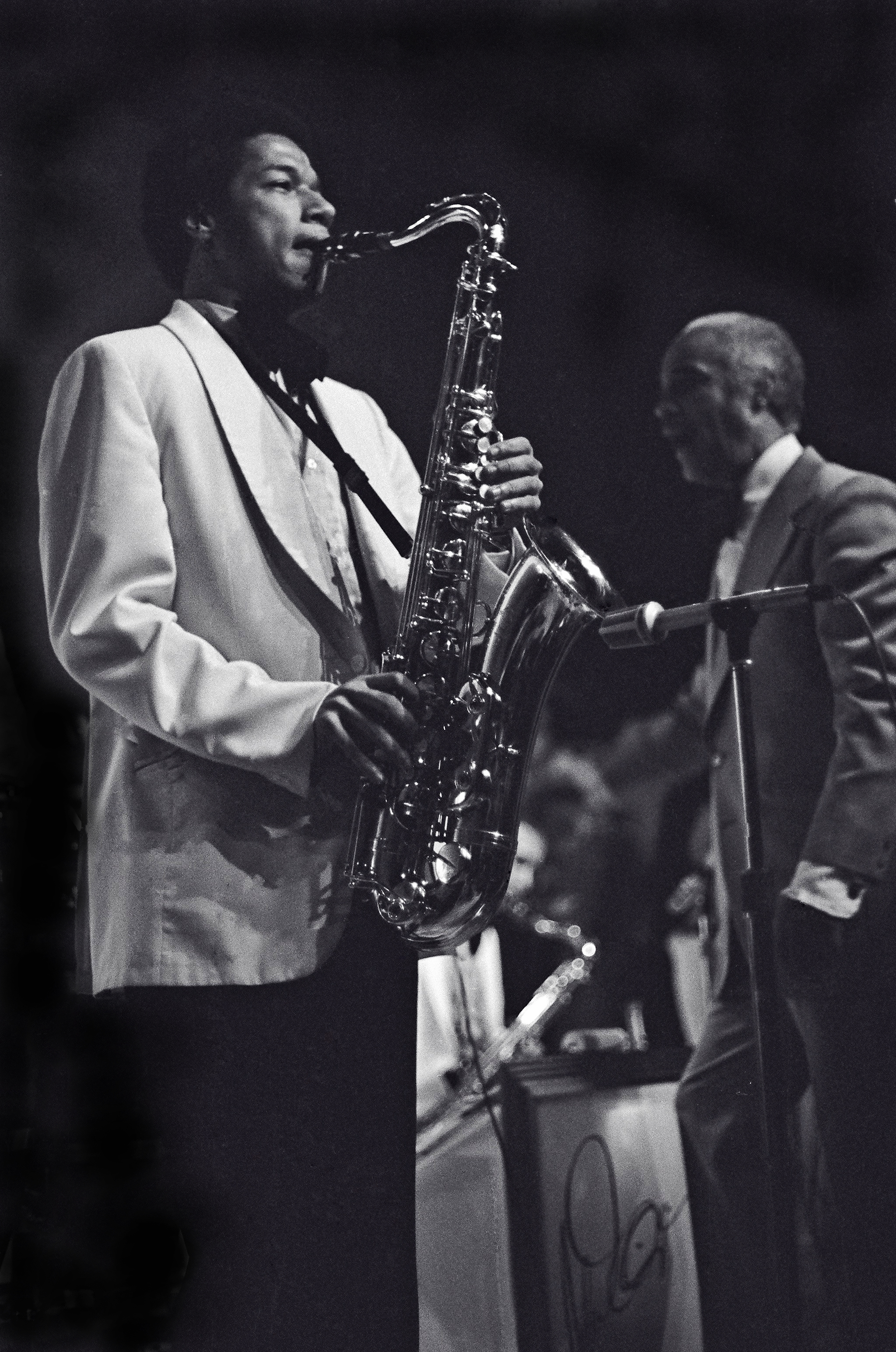
Ford and Mercer Ellington (right) in 1975

Ricky Ford (born March 4, 1954) is an American jazz tenor saxophonist.

== Biography ==
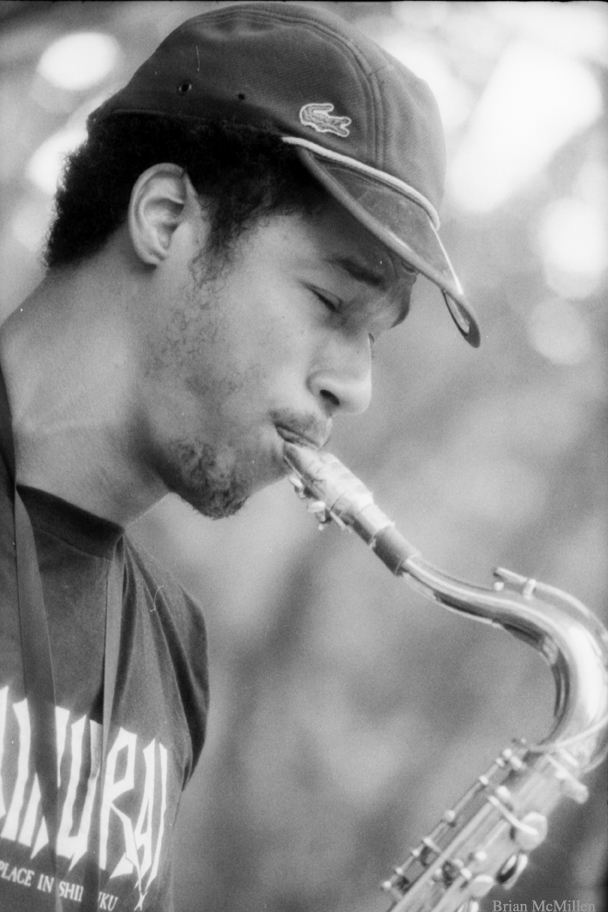
Ricky Ford at Bryant Park New York NY 8/17/84

Ford was born in Boston, Massachusetts, United States,) and studied at the New England Conservatory. In 1974, he recorded with Gunther Schuller and then played in the Duke Ellington Orchestra under Mercer Ellington from 1974 to 1976. After this he played with Charles Mingus (1976–1977), Dannie Richmond (1978–1981), Lionel Hampton (1980–1982), and then in the Mingus Dynasty (1982). He also played with Abdullah Ibrahim (1983–1990) and Mal Waldron (1989–1994), and has recorded with many other notable musicians including Yusef Lateef, Sonny Stitt, McCoy Tyner, Freddie Hubbard, Amina Claudine Myers, Sathima Bea Benjamin, Steve Lacy, and others.

Ford has recorded extensively as a leader for Muse and Candid.

He settled in Paris, France, in the 1990s. He taught at Istanbul Bilgi University from 2001 to 2006.

In 2009 he founded the Toucy Jazz Festival in Yonne, (France), and invited musicians including Rhoda Scott (2009) and Ravi Coltrane (2011).

== Discography ==
=== As leader/co-leader ===
- Loxodonta Africana (New World. 1977)
- Manhattan Plaza (Muse, 1978)
- Flying Colors (Muse, 1980)
- Tenor for the Times (Muse, 1981)
- Interpretations (Muse, 1982)
- Future's Gold (Muse, 1983)
- Shorter Ideas (Muse, 1984)
- Looking Ahead (Muse, 1986)
- Saxotic Stomp (Muse, 1987)
- Hard Groovin' (Muse, 1989)
- Manhattan Blues (Candid, 1989)
- Ebony Rhapsody (Candid, 1990) – live
- Hot Brass (Candid, 1992) – rec. 1991
- American-African Blues (Candid, 1992) – live rec. 1991
- Tenor Madness Too! (Muse, 1992)
- Tenors of Yusef Lateef & Ricky Ford with Yusef Lateef (YAL/Bomba, 1996) – rec. 1994
- Balaena (Jazz Friends Productions, 1999)
- Songs for My Mother (Jazz Friends Productions, 2002)
- Reeds and Keys with Kirk Lightsey (Jazz Friends Productions, 2003)
- Green Note - Live at La Fenêtre (Marge, 2003)
- 7095 with Ze Big Band (Solidor Productions, 2010)
- Sacred Concert with Ze Big Band (Ze Big Band Association, 2013)

=== As sideman ===
With Dannie Richmond

- Dannie Richmond Plays Charles Mingus (Timeless, 1981)
- Dionysius (Red, 1983)
- The Last Mingus Band A.D. (Landmark, 1994) – rec. 1980

With Mal Waldron

- Crowd Scene (Soul Note, 1989)
- Where Are You? (Soul Note, 1989)

With others

- Ran Blake, Short Life of Barbara Monk (Soul Note, 1986)
- Jaki Byard, July in Paris (Fariplay, 1998)
- Richard Davis, Total Package (Marge, 1998)
- Abdullah Ibrahim, Water from an Ancient Well (Tiptoe, 1986)
- Steve Lacy, Vespers (Soul Note, 1993)
- Ronnie Mathews, Legacy (Bee Hive, 1979)
- Red Rodney, The 3R's (Muse, 1982) – rec. 1979
- Rhoda Scott, Very Saxy - Live Au Meridien (Ahead, 2009)[2CD] – live
- Jack Walrath, Revenge of the Fat People (Stash, 1981)
