= Edward Bland (composer) =

American composer and musical director (1926–2013)

Edward Osmund Bland (July 25, 1926 – March 14, 2013) was an American composer and musical director.

== Biography ==
Bland was born on the South Side of Chicago to Althea and Edward Bland. His father was a postal worker but also a self-taught literary critic with illustrious friends such as Ralph Ellison, Gwendolyn Brooks and Langston Hughes. Edward senior died in the Battle of the Bulge in 1944, and son Edward Bland also briefly served in the Army during World War II, after which he studied at both the University of Chicago and the American Conservatory of Music on the G.I. Bill.

Among his compositions is a concerto for electric violin and chamber orchestra. He composed scores for the TV play A Raisin in the Sun (1989) and the film A Soldier's Story (1984). Another notable work is Sketches Set Seven for piano.

He also wrote, directed and produced the 1959 film The Cry of Jazz. In the 1990s, this documentary was rediscovered by scholars and celebrated as an early example of independent black filmmaking. It was soon restored and reissued on DVD in 1996, and in 2010 the Library of Congress added it to its National Film Registry collection as “a historic and fascinating film that comments on racism and the appropriation of jazz by those who fail to understand its artistic and cultural origins.”

== Discography ==
=== As arranger ===
With Eric Kloss

- Grits & Gravy (Prestige, 1966)
