= Elvin Jones discography =

This is the discography for the American jazz musician Elvin Jones.

== As leader/co-leader ==
Recording date	Title	Personnel	Label	Year released
1958-03	Keepin' Up with the Joneses	The Jones Brothers: Thad Jones, Hank Jones with Eddie Jones	MetroJazz	1958
1961-02	Together!	Co-leader with Philly Joe Jones; with Blue Mitchell, Curtis Fuller, Hank Mobley, Wynton Kelly, Paul Chambers	Atlantic	1964
1961-07, 1961-12, 1962-01	Elvin!	Frank Wess, Frank Foster, Art Davis, Hank Jones, Thad Jones	Riverside	1962
1963-08	Illumination!	Co-leader with Jimmy Garrison; with Prince Lasha, Sonny Simmons, Charles Davis, McCoy Tyner	Impulse!	1964
1965-02	Dear John C.	Richard Davis, Hank Jones, Roland Hanna, Charlie Mariano	Impulse!	1965
1965-02, 1965-03	And Then Again	J. J. Johnson, Frank Wess, Charles Davis, Don Friedman, Paul Chambers, Thad Jones, Hank Jones, Art Davis	Atlantic	1965
1966-03	Midnight Walk	Thad Jones, Hank Mobley, Dollar Brand, Steve James, Don Moore	Atlantic	1967
1967-06	Heavy Sounds	Richard Davis, Frank Foster, Billy Greene	Impulse!	1968
1968-03	Live at the Village Vanguard	Wilbur Little, George Coleman, Marvin Peterson	Enja	1974
1968-04	Puttin' It Together	Joe Farrell, Jimmy Garrison	Blue Note	1968
1968-09	The Ultimate	Jimmy Garrison, Joe Farrell	Blue Note	1969
1969-09	Poly-Currents	George Coleman, Joe Farrell, Pepper Adams, Wilbur Little, Candido Camero, Fred Tompkins	Blue Note	1970
1970-07	Coalition	George Coleman, Frank Foster, Wilbur Little, Candido Camero,	Blue Note	1970
1971-02	Genesis	Gene Perla, Frank Foster, Dave Liebman, Joe Farrell	Blue Note	1971
1971-02; 1971-12	Merry-Go-Round	Dave Liebman, Steve Grossman, Joe Farrell, Chick Corea, Jan Hammer, Don Alias, Gene Perla	Blue Note	1972
1971-09	Elvin Jones Live: The Town Hall	Gene Perla, Chick Corea, Joe Farrell, Frank Foster	PM	1975
1972-02	Hollow Out	Masabumi Kikuchi, Gene Perla	Philips (Japan)	1973
1972-07	Live at Carnegie Hall	Dave Liebman, Steve Grossman, Gene Perla	PM	2018
1969-09, 1972-07	Mr. Jones	Joe Farrell, Pepper Adams, Dave Liebman, Jan Hammer, Gene Perla	Blue Note	1973
1972-09	Live at the Lighthouse	Dave Liebman, Steve Grossman, Gene Perla	Blue Note	1973
1973-07	At This Point in Time	Steve Grossman, Pepper Adams, Jan Hammer	Blue Note	1998
1969-03, 1973-07	The Prime Element	George Coleman, Joe Farrell, Lee Morgan, Pepper Adams, Steve Grossman, Frank Foster	Blue Note	1976
1974-09	Mr. Thunder	Steve Grossman, Roland Prince, Milton Suggs, Luis Agudo, Sjunne Ferger	Eastwest	1974
1975	On the Mountain	Jan Hammer, Gene Perla	PM	1975
1975	New Agenda	Steve Grossman, Roland Prince, Dave Williams	Vanguard	1975
1976-01	Together	Co-leader with Oregon	Vanguard	1976
1976	The Main Force	Ryo Kawasaki, Al Dailey, Dave Liebman	Vanguard	1976
1976-11	Summit Meeting	James Moody, Clark Terry, Bunky Green, Roland Prince	Vanguard	1977
1976, 1977	Time Capsule	Bunky Green, Kenny Barron, Angel Allende, Ryo Kawasaki, Frank Wess, Milt Hinton, Frank Foster, George Coleman, Junie Booth	Vanguard	1977
1978-02	Remembrance	Pat LaBarbera, Michael Stuart, Roland Prince, Andy McCloud III	MPS	1978
1978-03	Elvin Jones Music Machine	Frank Foster, Pat LaBarbera, Roland Prince, Andy McCloud III	Mark Levison (Japan)	1982
1978-04	Live in Japan 1978: Dear John C.	Frank Foster, Pat LaBarbera, Roland Prince, Andy McCloud III	Trio (Japan)	1978
1978-04	Elvin Jones Jazz Machine Live in Japan Vol. 2	Frank Foster, Pat LaBarbera, Roland Prince, Andy McCloud III	Trio (Japan)	1978
1979-06	Very R.A.R.E.	Art Pepper, Sir Roland Hanna, Richard Davis (bassist)	Trio (Japan)	1980
1980-06	Soul Train	Andrew White, Richard "Ari" Brown, Marvin Horne, Andy McCloud III	Denon	1980
1980-08	Heart to Heart	Tommy Flanagan, Richard Davis	Denon	1981
1982-02	Earth Jones	Kenny Kirkland, Dave Liebman, Terumasa Hino, George Mraz	Palo Alto	1982
1982-04	Love & Peace	McCoy Tyner, Pharoah Sanders, Jean-Paul Bourelly, Richard Davis	Trio (Japan)	1982
1982-10	Brother John	Kenny Kirkland, Reggie Workman, Pat LaBarbera	Palo Alto	1984
1984-07	Live at the Village Vanguard Volume One	Frank Foster, Pat LaBarbera, Fumio Karashima, Chip Jackson	Landmark	1984
1985-08	Elvin Jones Jazz Machine Live at Pit Inn	Sonny Fortune, Pat LaBarbera, Fumio Karashima, Richard Davis	Polydor (Japan)	1985
1990-05	Power Trio	John Hicks, Cecil McBee	Novus	1991
1990-12	When I Was at Aso-Mountain	Sonny Fortune, Takehisa Tanaka, Cecil McBee	Enja	1993
1991-06	In Europe	Sonny Fortune, Ravi Coltrane, Willie Pickens, Chip Jackson	Enja	1992
1992-04	Youngblood	Joshua Redman, Javon Jackson, Nicholas Payton, George Mraz	Enja	1992
1992-10	Going Home	Willie Pickens, Ravi Coltrane, Kent Jordan, Brad Jones, Nicholas Payton	Enja	1993
1992-12	Tribute to John Coltrane "A Love Supreme"	Wynton Marsalis, Marcus Roberts, Reginald Veal	Columbia (Japan)	1994
1993-10	It Don't Mean a Thing	Nicholas Payton, Sonny Fortune, Delfeayo Marsalis, Willie Pickens, Cecil McBee, Kevin Mahogany	Enja	1994
1998-08	Momentum Space	Cecil Taylor, Dewey Redman	Verve	1999
1999-09	The Truth: Heard Live at the Blue Note	Darren Barrett, Robin Eubanks, Carlos McKinney, Michael Brecker	Half Note	2004

== As sideman ==
Recording	Leader	Album	Label	Released	Note
1948	Various Artists / Billy Mitchell	Swing...Not Spring!	Savoy	1956	Compilation album
1955–07	Miles Davis	Blue Moods	Duet	1955	
1956–07	J. J. Johnson	J Is for Jazz	Columbia	1956	
1956–11	Art Farmer	Farmer's Market	New Jazz	1958	
1956–12, 1957–01	Thad Jones	Mad Thad	Period	1957	
1956–07, 1957–02	Thad Jones	The Magnificent Thad Jones Vol. 3	Blue Note	1957	
1957–02	Kenny Burrell	Kenny Burrell	Prestige	1957	
1957–02	Thad Jones and the Prestige All Stars	Olio	Prestige	1957	
1957	Aaron Bell	After the Party's Over	RCA Victor	1958	
1957–01, 1957–05	J. J. Johnson	Dial J. J. 5	Columbia	1957	
1957–05	Paul Chambers	Paul Chambers Quintet	Blue Note	1958	
1957–05	Bobby Jasper	Tenor and Flute	Riverside	1957	
1957–08	Tommy Flanagan	Overseas	Prestige	1958	
1957–11	Sonny Rollins	Night at the Village Vanguard	Blue Note	1958	Live
1957–11	Pepper Adams	The Cool Sound of Pepper Adams	Regent	1958	
1957–10, 1957–12	Idrees Sulieman and the Prestige All Stars	Roots	New Jazz	1958	
1958–01	Mal Waldron	Mal/3: Sounds	Prestige	1958	
1958–03	Thad Jones	Keepin' Up with the Joneses	Metrojazz	1959	
1958–03	Pepper Adams and Jimmy Knepper	The Pepper-Knepper Quintet	MetroJazz	1958	
1958–04	Pepper Adams	10 to 4 at the 5 Spot	Riverside	1958	Live
1958–04	Bennie Green	Soul Stirrin'	Blue Note	1958	
1958–10	Steve Lacy	Reflections	New Jazz	1959	
1958	Hank Jones	Porgy and Bess	Capitol	1959	
1959–02	Gil Evans	Great Jazz Standards	World Pacific	1959	
1959–03	Tommy Flanagan	Lonely Town	Blue Note	1979	
1959–03	Curtis Fuller	Sliding Easy	United Artists	1959	
1959–05	Randy Weston	Destry Rides Again	United Artists	1959	
1959–05	Art Farmer	Brass Shout	United Artists	1959	
1959?	Thad Jones	Motor City Scene	United Artists	1959	
1959?	Harry Lookofsky	Stringsville	Collectables	1959	
1959–12	Jimmy Forrest	All the Gin Is Gone	Delmark	1965	
1959–12	Jimmy Forrest	Black Forrest	Delmark	1972	
1959–11, 1960–03	Miles Davis	Sketches of Spain	Columbia	1960	
1960–01	Julian Priester	Keep Swingin'	Riverside	1960	
1960–10	John Coltrane	Coltrane Jazz	Atlantic	1961	1 track
1960–10	John Coltrane	Coltrane Plays the Blues	Atlantic	1962	
1960–10	John Coltrane	Coltrane's Sound	Atlantic	1964	
1960–10	John Coltrane	My Favorite Things	Atlantic	1961	
1960–11, 1960–12	Gil Evans	Out Of The Cool	Impulse!	1961	
1960–12, 1961–01	Barry Harris	Preminado	Riverside	1961	
1961–02	Clifford Jordan and Sonny Red	A Story Tale	Jazzland	1961	
1961–05	John Coltrane	Olé Coltrane	Atlantic	1961	
1961–05, 1961–06	John Coltrane	Africa/Brass	Impulse!	1961	
1961–08	Lee Konitz	Motion	Verve	1961	
1961–08	Freddie Hubbard	Ready for Freddie	Blue Note	1962	
1961–11	John Coltrane	Live! at the Village Vanguard	Impulse!	1962	Live
1961–11	John Coltrane	So Many Things: The European Tour 1961	Acrobat	2015	Live
1961–12	Yusef Lateef	Into Something	New Jazz	1962	
1962–01	McCoy Tyner	Inception	Impulse!	1962	
1962–02, 1962–04, 1962–05	Pony Poindexter	Pony's Express	Epic	1962	
1962–04, 1962–06	John Coltrane	Coltrane	Impulse!	1962	
1961–11, 1962–09	John Coltrane	Impressions	Impulse!	1963	Partially live
1962–09	John Coltrane and Duke Ellington	Duke Ellington & John Coltrane	Impulse!	1963	
1961–12, 1962–09, 1962–11	John Coltrane	Ballads	Impulse!	1963	
1963–03	John Coltrane	Both Directions at Once: The Lost Album	Impluse!	2018	
1963–03	John Coltrane	John Coltrane and Johnny Hartman	Impulse!	1963	
1963–03	Jimmy Woods	Conflict	Contemporary	1963	
1963–10	Johnny Hartman	I Just Dropped By To Say Hello	Impulse!	1963	
1963–10	Hank Jones	Here's Love	Argo	1963	
1963–10, 1963–11	John Coltrane	Live at Birdland	Impulse!	1964	Live
1964–01	Andrew Hill	Judgment!	Blue Note	1964	
1964–02	McCoy Tyner	Today and Tomorrow	Impulse!	1964	
1964–04	Joe Henderson	In 'n Out	Blue Note	1965	
1964–04	Wayne Shorter	Night Dreamer	Blue Note	1964	
1964–05	Stan Getz and Bill Evans	Stan Getz & Bill Evans	Verve	1973	
1964–05	Grant Green	Matador	Blue Note	1979	
1964–05	Bob Brookmeyer	Bob Brookmeyer and Friends	Verve	1965	
1964–04, 1964–06	John Coltrane	Crescent	Impulse!	1964	
1964–06	Grant Green	Solid	Blue Note	1979	
1963–09, 1964–07	Gil Evans	The Individualism of Gil Evans	Verve	1964	
1964–08	Wayne Shorter	JuJu	Blue Note	1965	
1964–09	Grant Green	Talkin' About!	Blue Note	1965	
1964–10	Solomon Ilori	African High Life	Blue Note	2006	CD reissue includes 3 bonus tracks with Elvin Jones
1964–11	Larry Young	Into Somethin'	Blue Note	1965	
1964–11	Grant Green	Street of Dreams	Blue Note	1967	
1964–11	Joe Henderson	Inner Urge	Blue Note	1966	
1964–12	McCoy Tyner	McCoy Tyner Plays Ellington	Impulse!	1965	
1964–12	John Coltrane	A Love Supreme	Impulse!	1965	
1964–12	Wayne Shorter	Speak No Evil	Blue Note	1966	
1965–01	Roland Kirk	Rip, Rig and Panic	Limelight	1965	
1965–03	Various Artists / John Coltrane	The New Wave in Jazz	Impulse!	1965	Live omnibus album
1965–03	Grant Green	I Want to Hold Your Hand	Blue Note	1966	
1965–03, 1965–05	John Coltrane	Live at the Half Note: One Down, One Up	Impulse!	2005	Live
1965–02, 1965–05	John Coltrane	The John Coltrane Quartet Plays	Impulse!	1965	
1965–05, 1965–06	John Coltrane	Transition	Impulse!	1970	
1965–06	John Coltrane	Living Space	Impulse!	1998	Compilation album
1965–07	John Coltrane	New Thing at Newport	Impulse!	1966	Live split album with Archie Shepp
1965–08	John Coltrane	Sun Ship	Impulse!	1975	
1965–09	John Coltrane	First Meditations	Impulse!	1977	
1965–09	John Coltrane	Live In Seattle	Impulse!	1971	Live
1965–10	John Coltrane	Om	Impulse!	1968	
1965–10	John Coltrane	Kulu Sé Mama	Impulse!	1967	
1965–11	Larry Young	Unity	Blue Note	1966	
1965–11	John Coltrane	Meditations	Impulse!	1966	
1966–01	Earl Hines	Here Comes Earl "Fatha" Hines	Contact	1966	
1966–03	Freddie Hubbard	Blue Spirits	Blue Note	1967	
1966–05	Sonny Rollins	East Broadway Run Down	Impulse!	1967	
1967–04	McCoy Tyner	The Real McCoy	Blue Note	1967	
1967–09	Lee Konitz	The Lee Konitz Duets	Milestone	1968	
1967–10	Jaki Byard	Sunshine of My Soul	Prestige	1967	
1968–04, 1968–05	Ornette Coleman	New York Is Now!	Blue Note	1968	
1968–04, 1968–05	Ornette Coleman	Love Call	Blue Note	1971	
1968	Larry Coryell	Lady Coryell	Vanguard	1969	
1968–12	Pepper Adams	Encounter!	Prestige	1969	
1969–02	Phineas Newborn, Jr.	Please Send Me Someone to Love	Contemporary	1969	
1969–02	Phineas Newborn, Jr.	Harlem Blues	Contemporary	1975	
1969–02	Barney Kessel	Feeling Free	Contemporary	1969	
1969	Gil Evans	Gil Evans	Ampex	1970	
1969–06, 1969–07, 1969–12	Allen Ginsberg	Songs of Innocence and Experience	MGM	1970	
1970–02	McCoy Tyner	Extensions	Blue Note	1973	
1971–11	Joe Farrell	Outback	CTI	1972	
1972?	Frank Foster	The Loud Minority	Mainstream	1972	
1973	Billy Harper	Capra Black	Strata-East	1974	
1974?	Elek Bacsik	I Love You	Bob Thiele Music	1974	
1975–02	McCoy Tyner	Trident	Milestone	1975	
1975–07	Stan Getz and Jimmie Rowles	The Peacocks	Columbia	1977	
1976–09	Art Pepper	The Trip	Contemporary	1977	
1976–09	Phineas Newborn, Jr.	Back Home	Contemporary	1985	
1977–02	Tommy Flanagan	Eclypso	Enja	1980	
1977–06	Chico Freeman	Beyond the Rain	Contemporary	1978	
1977–06	Ray Brown	Something for Lester	Contemporary	1978	
1977–07	Art Pepper	Thursday Night at the Village Vanguard	Contemporary	1979	Live
1977–07	Art Pepper	Friday Night at the Village Vanguard	Contemporary	1980	Live
1977–07	Art Pepper	Saturday Night at the Village Vanguard	Contemporary	1979	Live
1977–07	Art Pepper	More for Les at the Village Vanguard	Contemporary	1985	Live
1977–10	Frank Foster	Well Water	Piadrum	2007	
1977–02, 1978–11	Tommy Flanagan	Confirmation	Enja	1982	
1980–02	Tommy Flanagan	Super-Session	Enja	1980	
1981	Pharoah Sanders	Rejoice	Theresa	1981	
1982–11, 1982–12	Bennie Wallace	Big Jim's Tango	Enja	1983	
1987–06	Lew Soloff	But Beautiful	King	1987	
1987–11	James Williams	Magical Trio 2	Emarcy	1988	
1988–07	Marcus Roberts	The Truth is Spoken Here	Novus	1989	
1990–03	David Murray	Special Quartet	DIW/Columbia	1991	
1990?	Kenny Garrett	African Exchange Student	Atlantic	1990	
1991?	Sonny Sharrock	Ask the Ages	Axiom	1991	
1991–12	Javon Jackson	Me And Mr. Jones	Criss Cross	1992	
1993–02	Hank Jones	Upon Reflection: The Music of Thad Jones	Verve	1993	
1993–11	Robert Hurst	One For Namesake	DIW	1993	
1994–12	John McLaughlin	After the Rain	Verve	1995	
1995–05	Shirley Horn	The Main Ingredient	Verve	1996	
1995–05	Greg Packham	Into The Frying Pan	Packed	1998	
1997–09	James Williams	Awesome!	DIW	2000	
1997–09	Joe Lovano	Trio Fascination: Edition One	Blue Note	1998	
1998–05	Steve Griggs	Jones for Elvin - Volumes 1 and 2	Hip City Music	2000	
1999?	Michael Brecker	Time Is of the Essence	Verve	1999	
1999?	Gary LeMel	Moonlighting	Atlantic	1999	
2000–07	Stefano di Battista	Stefano di Battista	Blue Note	2000	
2000, 2001	Bill Frisell	With Dave Holland and Elvin Jones	Nonesuch	2001	
2002–05	Hank Jones (The Great Jazz Trio)	Autumn Leaves	Eighty-Eight's	2002	
2002–05, 2003–08	Hank Jones (The Great Jazz Trio)	Someday My Prince Will Come	Eighty-Eight's	2003	
2002–05, 2004–02	Hank Jones (The Great Jazz Trio)	Collaboration	Eighty-Eight's	2004	
