= Some Shapes to Come =

Studio album by Steve Grossman
- Released: 1974
- Recorded: September 4, 5 & 6, 1973
- Studio: The Secret Sound, New York
- Genre: Jazz fusion, hard bop
- Length: 42:58
- Label: PM Records
- Producer: Gene Perla

Steve Grossman chronology
Some Shapes to Come (1974)	Jazz A Confronto 23 (1975)

Some Shapes to Come is the debut album by American saxophonist Steve Grossman. It was released in 1974 by PM Records.

== Reception ==
Professional ratings
Review scores
Source	Rating
AllMusic	4/5 stars

At AllMusic, critic Vincent Thomas writes about Some Shapes to Come that:

[...] is an album you can stand up against almost any of the jazz fusion standouts of the '70s. No, it can't go toe to toe with that era's seminal landmark albums (Bitches Brew, Multiple, Black Market, Emergency!, etc), but in terms of artistry, musicianship, and ambition it is among the next tier of thoroughly excellent works [...] There are no lowlights on this album, no soft moments. Often overlooked, it is one of the '70s most unheralded jazz gems [...]

At Record Collector magazine, viewer Jamie Atkins notes that:

[...] 1973's Some Shapes To Come is a wild ride, and a logical extension of the boundary-pushing hard-bop direction in which Grossman and Gene Perla (bass) had been heading with Elvin Jones (check out 1972's Live at the Lighthouse). Add Don Alias (Bitches Brew, Don Juan's Reckless Daughter) on loose, exploratory percussion and Jan Hammer of Mahavishnu Orchestra on keys and you have a pretty spicy proposition on your hands [...]

== Track listing ==
No.	Title	Writer(s)	Length
1.	"WBAI"	Steve Grossman	2:07
2.	"Haresah"	Steve Grossman	7:06
3.	"Zulu Stomp"	Don Alias	6:13
4.	"Extemporaneous Combustion"	Don Alias, Gene Perla, Jan Hammer, Steve Grossman	6:10
5.	"Alodian Mode"	Don Alias, Gene Perla, Jan Hammer, Steve Grossman	7:00
6.	"Pressure Point"	Steve Grossman	4:52
7.	"The Sixth Sense"	Don Alias, Gene Perla, Jan Hammer, Steve Grossman	9:30

== Personnel ==
- Steve Grossman – tenor saxophone, soprano saxophone
- Don Alias – drums, congas, bongos, bells
- Gene Perla – electric bass, acoustic bass, mixed by (mixing engineer), producer
- Jan Hammer – electric piano, synthesizer (Moog)
- Jamie Farfan – artwork (cover painting)
- David Le Sage – engineer (overdub)
- Mark "Moogy" Klingman – engineer (recording)
- Charles Suber – liner notes
- Anne Marie Schnider – photography by, design (cover design)
