= The Prime Element =

Studio album by Elvin Jones
- Released: 1976
- Recorded: March 14, 1969 (#C1–D2); Van Gelder Studio, Englewood Cliffs; July 24 & 26, 1973 (#A1–B2); A&R Recording Studios, New York City
- Genre: Jazz
- Length: 83:00
- Label: Blue Note; BN-LA506-H2

Professional ratings
Review scores
Source	Rating
Allmusic	4/5 stars

The Prime Element is a jazz album by jazz drummer Elvin Jones, originally released in 1976 as part of the "Blue Note Re-issue Series". The pieces compiled here were recorded in 1969 and 1973. The tracks from 1973 (#A1 to #B2) would be included on At This Point in Time in 1998. The remainder can only be found on the eight-disc Mosaic compilation The Complete Blue Note Elvin Jones Sessions, issued in 2000.

== Track listing ==
Side A

1. "At This Point in Time" (Frank Foster) – 7:34
2. "Currents/Pollen" (Gene Perla, D. Garcia) – 11:13

Side B

1. "The Prime Element" (Omar Clay) – 8:19
2. "Whims of Bal" (Clay) – 12:24

Side C

1. "Inner Space" (Chick Corea) – 6:32
2. "Once I Loved [O Amor Em Paz]" (Jobim, De Moraez) – 6:22
3. "Raynay" (Elvin Jones) – 7:57

Side D

1. "Champagne Baby" (Joe Farrell) – 11:26
2. "Dido Afrique" (Jones) – 11:13

Recorded on March 14, 1969 (#C1–D2), July 24 (#B1–B2) and July 26 (#A1–A2), 1973.

== Personnel ==
Tracks A1–B2

- Elvin Jones - drums, leader
- Steve Grossman - soprano and tenor saxophone
- Frank Foster - soprano and tenor saxophone
- Pepper Adams - baritone saxophone
- Cornell Dupree - guitar
- Jan Hammer - piano, electric piano, synthesizer
- Gene Perla - bass, electric bass
- Candido Camero - congas
- Richie 'Pablo' Landrum - percussion
- Omar Clay - percussion, programmable rhythm box
- Warren Smith - tympani

Tracks C1–D2

- Elvin Jones - drums
- Lee Morgan - trumpet
- Joe Farrell - soprano saxophone, tenor saxophone, flute, alto flute
- George Coleman - tenor saxophone
- Wilbur Little - bass
- Candido Camero - congas
- Miovelito Valles - percussion
