= Fred Tompkins =

American jazz flautist and composer (born 1943)

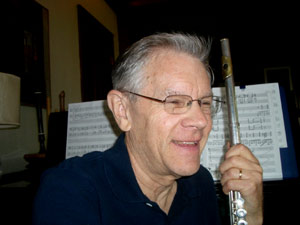
- Fred Tompkins

Background information
- Born: Fred Tompkins; 1943 (age 82–83)
- Origin: St. Louis, Missouri, United States
- Genres: Jazz, Third Stream
- Instrument: Flute
- Years active: 1960s–present

Fred Tompkins (born in St. Louis, Missouri, 1943) is an American jazz flautist and composer, best known for his work as a composer of third stream music.

== Early life ==
Tompkins played in his native Missouri for several years after high school and attended the St. Louis Institute of Music starting in 1964, pairing it with summer courses at Berklee College and the Aspen Music School. During this period he received instruction from Lee Humphreys, Trudy Kane, Graham Hollobon, Harold Bennett, Manus Sasonkin, Lukas Foss, and Vincent Persichetti. Early influences on his study and playing were John Coltrane, Art Blakey, Modern Jazz Quartet, Paul Hindemith and Béla Bartók.

== Jazz career ==
=== 1960s ===
In 1967 he changed his base of operations to New York City and developed an important relationship with jazz drummer Elvin Jones, with whom he would make recordings which also featured Joe Farrell, Jimmy Owens and other musicians. His career was put on hold, however, when he was conscripted in 1968. He was, however, able to find time to compose during this period, and it was during this time that his composition "Yes" found its way on to Elvin's LP Polycurrents.

=== 1970s ===
After three years of service, he returned to New York and continued to compose, perform and record. It was during this time that he became associated with the New Music Circle and premiered his composition "Four Lines" for flute, oboe, string bass and drums. His first LP "The Compositions of Fred Tompkins" showed him firmly rooted in third Stream composition, and featured the playing of Jones, Farrell, Owens, Wilbur Little, and Richard Davis. His next LP "Somesville", again featured challenging compositions, this time played by Jones, Lenny White, Gene Perla, Buster Williams, David Liebman and Steve Grossman. Tompkins' pieces are fully notated with respect to notes, dynamics and articulation, but the players take a little freedom, especially the rhythm section when there is one, to complement and propel the swing jazz feeling.

=== 1980s–present ===
The 1980s saw Tompkins setting music to the poetry of Emily Dickinson and E. E. Cummings (Lucy Shelton premiered his "Three Poems to E. E. Cummings" in a “live” radio broadcast on WBAI-FM radio in New York City), and in the 1990s he composed music to pieces by John Keats, Samuel Taylor Coleridge and St. Louis poet Michael Castro. The early 1980s also saw the premier of pieces Tompkins composed for the French horn player John Clark, which also incorporated the use of string synthesizer, arco bass, pizzicato bass and drums. In 1989, the world premiere of his piece "Duet Melody" was held at the Bar Harbor Festival and was performed by David Bilger and his wife Dorinne Bilger.

Tompkins has since also worked with Paul DeMarinis, Chuck Loeb, Frank Tusa, Lawrence Feldman, Noah Young, Bryant Hayes, Rick Cutler, Norman Carey, Anthony Jackson and many others. In 1990, he returned to St. Louis and continues to compose, perform (most notably with Debby Lennon, Ralph Butler, Gary Sykes and Charlie Dent, and Dave Black), announce on radio and participate on the board of the New Music Circle. His CD There is a Zone is a compilation of all his recorded music to the poetry of Emily Dickinson.

== Critical reviews ==
- “Outstanding in the first half of the program was Fred Tompkins’ “Four Lines”. Especially fine was the improvisatory drum part played by the great jazz drummer, Elvin Jones.”
- "The results [of the LP Cécile] are pieces — harmonically and tonally varied and melodically strong — which make use of woodwind sounds and have a firm underpinning of often driving piano lines and swinging but rhythmically broken bass and drum lines." — J. De Muth, Down Beat Magazine

== Partial Discography ==
As leader

- The Compositions of Fred Tompkins (1973, Festival 9001)
- Somesville (1975, Festival 9002)
- Cécile (1978, FKT 103)
- St. Louis Music (1999, The Orchard)
- Fanfare 8 (The Early Works of Fred Tompkins - compilation) (2000, The Orchard)
- Freedom Ring (2001)
- Cécile (2003, 2nd edition - compilation)
- There Is A Zone (2004)
- Curve Extended (2006, The Orchard)

As sideman with Elvin Jones

- Poly-Currents (1969, Blue Note)
