= Live at the Village Vanguard Volume One =

Live album by Elvin Jones
- Released: 1984
- Recorded: July 1, 1984
- Venue: Village Vanguard, New York City
- Genre: Jazz
- Length: 65:39
- Label: Landmark; ENJ 2306-1
- Producer: Herb Wong

Elvin Jones chronology
Brother John (1982)	Live at the Village Vanguard Volume One (1984)	Elvin Jones Jazz Machine Live at Pit Inn (1985)

Live at the Village Vanguard Volume One is a live album by jazz drummer Elvin Jones recorded in 1984 at the Village Vanguard and released on the Landmark label.

== Reception ==
The Allmusic review awarded the album 4 stars and stated "Not many drummer-led quintets feature two tenor saxophonists, but Elvin Jones, who has employed two tenors on several of his earlier recordings, clearly enjoys the stimulation that Frank Foster and Pat La Barbera provide one another on this live date at the Village Vanguard... Bassist Chip Jackson is solid throughout, and Jones' elastic approach to percussion keeps the music fresh throughout".

Professional ratings
Review scores
Source	Rating
Allmusic	4/5 stars

== Track listing ==
1. "It's Easy to Remember" (Lorenz Hart, Richard Rodgers) – 11:19
2. "Front Line" (Dave Samuels) – 11:15
3. "Tohryanse, Tohryanse" (Traditional) – 17:16
4. "George and Me" (Elvin Jones) – 6:30
5. "A Love Supreme" (John Coltrane) – 19:19

== Personnel ==
- Elvin Jones – drums
- Frank Foster, Pat LaBarbera – tenor saxophone
- Fumio Karashima – piano
- Chip Jackson – bass
