= Earth Jones =

Studio album by Elvin Jones
- Released: 1982
- Recorded: February 10, 1982
- Studio: Van Gelder, Englewood Cliffs, New Jersey
- Genre: Jazz
- Length: 42:17
- Label: Palo Alto; PA 8016, Quicksilver
- Producer: Herb Wong

Elvin Jones chronology
Heart to Heart (1980)	Earth Jones (1982)	Love & Peace (1982)

Earth Jones is a jazz album by drummer Elvin Jones, recorded in 1982 and released on the Palo Alto label.

== Reception ==
The AllMusic review states: "The solos are unpredictable but logical, and the blend between the lyrical Hino and Liebman is appealing".

Professional ratings
Review scores
Source	Rating
AllMusic	3/5 stars
The Penguin Guide to Jazz Recordings	3/4 stars

== Track listing ==
1. "Three Card Molly" (Elvin Jones) - 8:03
2. "Is Seeing Believing?" (Dave Liebman) - 7:58
3. "The Top of the Middle" (Liebman) - 3:56
4. "Earth Jones" (Liebman) - 7:07
5. "Never Let Me Go" (Ray Evans, Jay Livingston) - 7:27
6. "Day and Night" (Liebman) - 7:46

== Personnel ==
- Elvin Jones - drums
- Terumasa Hino - cornet
- Dave Liebman - soprano saxophone, flute
- Kenny Kirkland - piano, electric piano
- George Mraz - bass
