= Brother John =

Brother John may refer to:

- Brother John (film), a 1971 drama film
- Brother John (album), an album by jazz drummer Elvin Jones
- "Frère Jacques", a French nursery melody sometimes called "Brother John" in English
- Brother John Sellers (1924–1999), American gospel and folk singer
- Brother John (Scottish-born singer-songwriter) (1945–1994), alternative recording name for Johnny Cymbal
- Brother John, a character in the album The Lamb Lies Down on Broadway by Genesis
- "Brother John", a song by Joe Satriani on the album Not of This Earth
