= Sammie Cross =

Nigerian singer

Osayuwu Samuel Osarumwense (born 30 March 1988), known by his stage name Sammie Cross, is a Nigerian singer.

== Biography ==
Cross was born 30 March 1988 and raised in Benin City. He received a Bachelor of Science in microbiology from Benson Idahosa University.

His genre of music cuts across Afropop, pop, Hip-Hop, Afrobeats, Nigerian Street music, and Nigerian Street pop. As a musician, he is signed with PM Records.

As of 2023, he lived in Lekki.

== Discography ==
=== Selected singles ===
- Follow Me (2014)
- Take Alert (2016)

=== Extended plays ===
- Cruise & Storm (2022)
