= Broumas =

Broumas is a surname. Notable people with the surname include:

- Jamie Broumas (born 1959), American jazz singer and arts administrator
- Olga Broumas (born 1949), Greek poet
