= The Main Force =

Studio album by Elvin Jones
- Released: 1976
- Recorded: 1976; New York City
- Genre: Jazz
- Length: 42:38
- Label: Vanguard; VSD 79372
- Producer: Ed Bland

Elvin Jones chronology
New Agenda (1975)	The Main Force (1976)	Summit Meeting (1976)

The Main Force is a jazz album by drummer Elvin Jones, recorded in 1976 and released on the Vanguard label.

== Reception ==
The AllMusic review stated, "This inconsistent 1976 release from the mighty Elvin Jones is most successful when it draws on the high-energy, advanced hard bop style of the drummer's post-Coltrane period. It's a different story when it comes to the date's superfluous accommodations to fusion".

Professional ratings
Review scores
Source	Rating
AllMusic	2.5/5 stars
The Rolling Stone Jazz Record Guide	2/5 stars

== Track listing ==
1. "Salty Iron" (Ryo Kawasaki) - 5:19
2. "Sweet Mama" (Gene Perla) - 6:25
3. "Mini Modes" (David Williams) - 10:35
4. "Philomene" (Ed Bland) - 4:37
5. "Song of Rejoicing After Returning from a Hunt" (Traditional arranged by Gene Perla) - 15:42

== Personnel ==
- Elvin Jones – drums
- Pat LaBarbera, David Liebman (tracks 1 & 2), Steve Grossman, (tracks 2–5), Frank Foster (tracks 3–5) – reeds
- Albert Dailey – keyboards
- Ryo Kawasaki – guitar
- David Williams – bass
- Dave Johnson (tracks 1 & 2), Angel Allende (tracks 3–5) – percussion
