= Fearless Frank Foster =

Studio album by Frank Foster
- Released: 1966
- Recorded: December 2, 1965
- Studio: Van Gelder Studio, Englewood Cliffs, New Jersey
- Genre: Jazz
- Length: 41:20
- Label: Prestige; PR 7461
- Producer: Cal Lampley

Frank Foster chronology
Basie Is Our Boss (1962)	Fearless Frank Foster (1966)	Soul Outing! (1966)

Fearless Frank Foster is an album by saxophonist Frank Foster recorded in 1965 and released on the Prestige label.

== Reception ==
Professional ratings
Review scores
Source	Rating
Allmusic	4/5 stars
The Penguin Guide to Jazz Recordings	3/4 stars

Allmusic awarded the album 4 stars with its review by Scott Yanow stating, "Foster performs five originals, some of which fall into the area of funky hard bop. Spirited music".

== Track listing ==
All compositions by Frank Foster except as indicated

1. "Raunchy Rita" - 5:28
2. "Janie Huk" - 11:16
3. "Thingaroo" - 3:30
4. "Baby Ann" - 6:00
5. "Jitterbug Waltz" (Fats Waller) - 9:20
6. "Disapproachment" - 5:46

== Personnel ==
- Frank Foster - tenor saxophone
- Virgil Jones - trumpet
- Al Dailey - piano
- Bob Cunningham - bass
- Alan Dawson - drums
