= Ins and Outs =

Studio album by Lalo Schifrin
- Released: 1982
- Recorded: March 29 & 30, 1982; Hollywood, California
- Genre: Jazz
- Length: 37:42
- Label: Palo Alto; PA 8055-N
- Producer: Jeffrey Weber

Lalo Schifrin chronology
La Pelle (1981)	Ins and Outs (1982)	The Sting II (1982)

Ins and Outs is an album by Argentine composer, pianist and conductor Lalo Schifrin recorded in 1982 and released on the Palo Alto label, the same year.

== Reception ==
The Allmusic review stated "Schifrin had a rare opportunity to stretch out on piano... other than "Manteca," the emphasis is on easy-listening jazz. Nice music but not overly memorable".

Professional ratings
Review scores
Source	Rating
Allmusic	3/5 stars

== Track listing ==
All compositions by Lalo Schifrin except as indicated

1. "Ins and Outs" - 5:03
2. "Con Alma" (Dizzy Gillespie) - 5:10
3. "Love Poem for Donna" - 5:03
4. "Down Here on the Ground" - 4:36
5. "Manteca" (Gillespie, Chano Pozo, Gil Fuller) - 4:13
6. "Paraphrase" - 4:14
7. "Brazilian Impressions" - 4:28
8. "The Fox" - 4:55
- Recorded in Hollywood, California on March 29 & 30, 1982

== Personnel ==
- Lalo Schifrin - piano, arranger
- Sam Most - flutes
- Andy Simpkins - bass
- Earl Palmer - drums
- Paulinho Da Costa - percussion
