= On the Mountain (album) =

Studio album by Elvin Jones
- Released: 1975
- Recorded: 1975
- Studios: Red Gate Studio, Kent, New York
- Genre: Jazz Fusion
- Length: 34:28
- Label: PM Records
- Producer: Arif Mardin

Gene Perla chronology
| Mr. Thunder (1974) | On the Mountain (1975) | New Agenda (1975) |

On the Mountain is a jazz album by drummer Elvin Jones with keyboardist Jan Hammer and bassist Gene Perla recorded in 1975 and originally released on Perla's PM label.

== Reception ==
Professional ratings
Review scores
| Source | Rating |
|---|---|
| Allmusic | 3/5 stars |

Jim Todd of Allmusic called the album "a minor, if somewhat overlooked, classic from the tail-end of the early '70s to the mid-70s' run of great jazz fusion releases".

== Track listing ==
1. "Thorn of a White Rose" (Jan Hammer) - 5:07
2. "Namuh" (Gene Perla) - 7:47
3. "On the Mountain" (Perla) - 4:37
4. "Smoke in the Sun" (Hammer) - 4:00
5. "London Air" (Hammer) - 5:29
6. "Destiny" (Perla) - 7:28

== Personnel ==
- Elvin Jones - drums
- Jan Hammer - piano, electric piano, synthesizer
- Gene Perla - bass, electric bass
