= Soul Outing! =

Studio album by Frank Foster
- Released: 1966
- Recorded: June 27 and July 11, 1966
- Studio: Van Gelder Studio, Englewood Cliffs, New Jersey
- Genre: Jazz
- Length: 35:38
- Label: Prestige; PR 7479
- Producer: Cal Lampley

Frank Foster chronology
Fearless Frank Foster (1965)	Soul Outing! (1966)	Manhattan Fever (1968)

Soul Outing! is an album by the jazz saxophonist Frank Foster, recorded in 1966 and released on the Prestige label.

== Reception ==
Professional ratings
Review scores
Source	Rating
Allmusic	3/5 stars
The Penguin Guide to Jazz Recordings	3.5/4 stars

AllMusic awarded the album 3 stars in its review by Scott Yanow, stating: "Foster plays in a variety of modern mainstream styles from the era including funk, Latin, a bit of gospel and more straight-ahead. The overall results are not that memorable but they do show Foster growing beyond the world of Count Basie".

== Track listing ==
All compositions by Frank Foster except as indicated

1. "Show the Good Side" - 5:50
2. "While the City Sleeps" (Lee Adams, Charles Strouse) - 4:20
3. "Skankaroony" - 7:53
4. "Chiquito Loco" - 8:50
5. "Night Song" (Adams, Strouse) - 8:45
- Recorded at Van Gelder Studio in Englewood Cliffs, New Jersey on June 27 (tracks 1 & 5) and July 11 (tracks 2–4), 1966

== Personnel ==
- Frank Foster – tenor saxophone
- Virgil Jones – trumpet
- Pat Rebillot – piano
- Billy Butler – guitar (1, 5)
- Bob Cunningham (2–4), Richard Davis (1, 5) – bass
- Alan Dawson – drums
