= The Loud Minority =

Studio album by Frank Foster
- Released: 1972
- Genre: Jazz
- Length: 41:16
- Label: Mainstream; MRL 349
- Producer: Bob Shad

Frank Foster chronology
Manhattan Fever (1968)	The Loud Minority (1972)	Here and Now (1976)

The Loud Minority is an album by American saxophonist Frank Foster recorded for the Mainstream label.

== Reception ==
Professional ratings
Review scores
Source	Rating
AllMusic	3.5/5 stars

AllMusic awarded the album 3½ stars stating "Foster assembled a giant of a big band featuring dual instrumentation all around, including keyboards, basses, and drummers to power a horn section chock-full of the best mainstream jazz and progressive players of the day... a band that knows no bounds or limits, at its core a mighty modern jazz orchestra removed from Foster's work with the Count Basie band".

== Track listing ==
All compositions by Frank Foster

1. "The Loud Minority" – 14:33
2. "Requiem for Dusty" – 6:12
3. "J.P.'s Thing" – 11:43
4. "E.W. – Beautiful People" – 8:48

== Personnel ==
- Frank Foster – tenor saxophone, alto saxophone, soprano saxophone, alto clarinet
- Kenny Rodgers – alto saxophone, baritone saxophone, bass clarinet
- Cecil Bridgewater, Charles McGee – trumpet, flugelhorn
- Marvin Peterson – trumpet
- Dick Griffin – trombone
- Earl Dunbar – guitar
- Stanley Clarke, Gene Perla – bass guitar
- Harold Mabern, Jan Hammer – piano, electric piano
- Richard Pratt, Omar Clay – drums
- Elvin Jones – drums, percussion
- Airto Moreira – percussion
- Dee Dee Bridgewater – vocals
