= Keepin' Up with the Joneses =

Studio album by the Jones Brothers
- Released: 1958
- Recorded: March 24, 1958
- Studio: Belton, NYC
- Genre: Jazz
- Length: 35:43
- Label: MetroJazz; E 1003
- Producer: Leonard Feather

Thad Jones chronology
After Hours (1957)	Keepin' Up with the Joneses (1958)	Motor City Scene (1959)

Hank Jones chronology
Gigi (1958)	Keepin' Up with the Joneses (1958)	The Talented Touch (1958)

Elvin Jones chronology
Keepin' Up with the Joneses (1958)	Together! (1961)

Keepin' Up with the Joneses is an album by the Jones Brothers: trumpeter Thad, pianist Hank and drummer Elvin, along with bassist Eddie Jones, recorded for the MetroJazz label in 1958.

== Reception ==
Professional ratings
Review scores
Source	Rating
AllMusic	3/5 stars

The AllMusic review by Ken Dryden states: "In spite of their very long careers in jazz, brothers Hank, Thad and Elvin Jones made relatively few recordings together; this Leonard Feather-produced date got the three of them into the studio and added to the gimmick by including Eddie Jones (no relation) on bass, and performing exclusively works by Thad or Isham Jones (also no relation). ... Thad's rich flugelhorn is as strong as on any date he ever recorded, while Hank's playing is a little more reserved than usual, and Elvin, known for his fierce attack, sticks mainly to brushes".

== Track listing ==
All compositions by Thad Jones except where noted

1. "Nice and Nasty" – 6:45
2. "Keepin' Up with the Joneses" – 6:11
3. "Three and One" – 4:57
4. "Sput 'n' Jeff" – 6:04
5. "It Had to Be You" (Isham Jones, Gus Kahn) – 4:48
6. "On the Alamo" (Isham Jones, Kahn) – 3:13
7. "There Is No Greater Love" (Isham Jones, Marty Symes) – 4:04

== Personnel ==
- Thad Jones – flugelhorn, trumpet
- Hank Jones – piano, organ
- Elvin Jones – drums
- Eddie Jones – bass
