= When I Was at Aso-Mountain =

When I Was at As-Mountain

Studio album by Elvin Jones
- Released: 1993
- Recorded: December 10 & 11, 1990; New York City
- Genre: Jazz
- Length: 66:26
- Label: Enja; ENJ 7081-2

Elvin Jones chronology
Power Trio (1990)	When I Was at As-Mountain (1993)	In Europe (1991)

When I Was at Aso-Mountain is an album by jazz drummer Elvin Jones introducing Japanese pianist Takehisa Tanaka recorded in 1990 and released on the Enja label in 1993.

== Reception ==
The Allmusic review called the album "Not an essential recording except for Jones completists".

Professional ratings
Review scores
Source	Rating
Allmusic	3/5 stars

== Track listing ==
All compositions by Takehisa Tanaka except as indicated

1. "Beautiful Love" (Haven Gillespie, Wayne King, Egbert Van Alstyne, Victor Young) - 7:27
2. "I Was Too Young" - 8:25
3. "You Don't Know What Love Is" (Gene de Paul, Don Raye) - 10:14
4. "My Dream Come True, to E.J." - 5:23
5. "Dream Gypsy" (Judith Veevers) - 8:23
6. "When I Was at Aso-Mountain" - 8:12
7. "Soultrane" (Tadd Dameron) - 8:51
8. "Stella by Starlight" (Ned Washington, Victor Young) - 9:31

== Personnel ==
- Elvin Jones - drums
- Sonny Fortune - flute, tenor saxophone
- Takehisa Tanaka - piano
- Cecil McBee - bass
