= Coalition (album) =

Studio album by Elvin Jones
- Released: February 1971
- Recorded: July 17, 1970
- Studio: Van Gelder, Englewood Cliffs, NJ
- Genre: Jazz
- Length: 39:00
- Label: Blue Note; BST 84361
- Producer: Francis Wolff

Elvin Jones chronology
Poly-Currents (1969)	Coalition (1971)	Genesis (1971)

Coalition is an album by American jazz drummer Elvin Jones, recorded in 1970 and released on the Blue Note label. It features Jones in a quintet with tenor saxophonists Frank Foster and George Coleman, conguero Candido Camero and bassist Wilbur Little.

== Reception ==
The AllMusic review by Scott Yanow stated, "This was a particularly creative and often intense ensemble, attached to the hard bop tradition but always looking forward".

Professional ratings
Review scores
Source	Rating
AllMusic	4/5 stars
DownBeat	4/5 stars

== Track listing ==
1. "Shinjitu" (Elvin Jones) - 7:38
2. "Yesterdays" (Otto Harbach, Jerome Kern) - 10:56
3. "5/4 Thing" (George Coleman) - 5:26
4. "Ural Stradania" (Frank Foster) - 8:29
5. "Simone" (Foster) - 6:31

== Personnel ==
- Elvin Jones – drums
- George Coleman – tenor saxophone
- Frank Foster – tenor saxophone, bass clarinet
- Wilbur Little – bass
- Candido Camero – conga, tambourine
