= New Agenda (album) =

Studio album by Elvin Jones
- Released: 1975
- Recorded: 1975; New York City
- Genre: Jazz
- Length: 42:28
- Label: Vanguard; VSD 79362
- Producer: Ed Bland

Elvin Jones chronology
Elvin Jones is "On the Mountain" (1975)	New Agenda (1975)	The Main Force (1976)

New Agenda is a jazz album by drummer Elvin Jones, recorded in 1975 and released on the Vanguard label.

Professional ratings
Review scores
Source	Rating
AllMusic	3/5 stars
The Rolling Stone Jazz Record Guide	3/5 stars

== Track listing ==
1. "Someone's Rocking My Jazzboat" (Frank Foster) - 6:50
2. "Naima" (John Coltrane) - 6:08
3. "Haresah" (Steve Grossman) - 8:07
4. "Anti-Calypso" (Roland Prince) - 5:19
5. "Stefanie" (Ed Bland) - 4:40
6. "My Lover" (Sutekina Hito) - 3:36
7. "Agenda" (Elvin Jones) - 7:48

== Personnel ==
- Elvin Jones – drums
- Steve Grossman – tenor saxophone, soprano saxophone, flute
- Roland Prince – guitar
- David Williams – bass
- Frank Ippolito (tracks 1–2, 4–5 & 7) – percussion
- Frank Foster (tracks 1–2 & 5) – tenor saxophone, soprano saxophone
- Azar Lawrence (tracks 3–4) - tenor saxophone, soprano saxophone
- Guilherme Franco (tracks 3–4) – percussion
- Joe Farrell (tracks 5 & 7) – tenor saxophone, soprano saxophone
- Gene Perla (tracks 5 & 7) – piano - piano
- Candido Camero (tracks 5 & 7) – percussion
- Kenny Barron (track 1) – piano
