= Genesis (Elvin Jones album) =

Studio album by Elvin Jones
- Released: September 1971
- Recorded: February 12, 1971
- Studio: Van Gelder Studio, Englewood Cliffs, NJ
- Genre: Jazz
- Length: 39:12
- Label: Blue Note; BST 84369
- Producer: Francis Wolff, George Butler

Elvin Jones chronology
Coalition (1970)	Genesis (1971)	Merry-Go-Round (1971)

Genesis is an album by American jazz drummer Elvin Jones recorded in 1971 and released on the Blue Note label. It features Jones in a quintet with saxophonists Joe Farrell, Frank Foster and Dave Liebman, and bassist Gene Perla.

== Reception ==
The Allmusic review by Scott Yanow awarded the album 4 stars stating "Elvin Jones' band had expanded during 1969-71 from a pianoless trio to a three-horn quintet... it would not be an overstatement to call this a powerful unit... the musicians take long, heated solos that straddle the boundary between hard bop and the avant-garde. Their album has plenty of invigorating music".

Professional ratings
Review scores
Source	Rating
Allmusic	4/5 stars

== Track listing ==
1. "P.P. Phoenix" (Gene Perla) - 5:00
2. "For All the Other Times" (Perla) - 10:07
3. "Slumber" (Dave Liebman) - 5:32
4. "Three Card Molly" (Elvin Jones) - 8:27
5. "Cecilia Is Love (Frank Foster) - 10:06

== Personnel ==
- Elvin Jones - drums
- Joe Farrell, Dave Liebman - tenor saxophone, soprano saxophone
- Frank Foster - tenor saxophone, alto flute, alto clarinet
- Gene Perla - bass, electric bass
