= Palo Alto Records =

American jazz record label

Palo Alto Records was a jazz record company and label that released most of its discography in the 1980s. The label was founded in 1981 by Jim Benham, who lived in Palo Alto, California. He played trumpet in a big band and was chairman of the Benham Capital Management Group. Herb Wong, an educator and disc jockey in San Francisco, was artistic director until 1985. The Palo Alto office closed that year, but the label moved to Studio City. Palo Alto also operated a sublabel, TBA Records, which recorded Alvin Hayes, George Howard, and Rare Silk.

== Discography ==
- 8001: Full Faith & Credit Big Band – Debut (1980)
- 8002: Paul Robertson – The Song Is You (1980)
- 8003: Full Faith & Credit Big Band – Jazz Faire (1981)
- 8004: Barone Brothers – Blues and Other Happy Moments (1979)
- 8005: Tee Carson – Basically Count (1981)
- 8007: Lanny Morgan – It's About Time (1981)
- 8008: Les Demerle – On Fire (1981)
- 8009: Pepper Adams – Urban Dreams (1981)
- 8010: Don Menza – Hip Pocket (1981)
- 8011: Buddy DeFranco & Terry Gibbs – Jazz Party/First Time Together (1981)
- 8012: Larry Vuckovich – City Sounds, Village Voices (1981)
- 8013: Paul Robertson – Old Friends, New Friends (1982)
- 8014: Mal Waldron – One Entrance, Many Exits (1982)
- 8016: Elvin Jones – Earth Jones (1982)
- 8017: Tom Harrell – Play of Light (1984)
- 8019: Meredith D'Ambrosio – Little Jazz Bird (1982)
- 8020: Mike Campbell – Secret Fantasy (1982)
- 8021: Jimmy Forrest – Heart of the Forrest (1978)
- 8022: Marvin Stamm – Stammpede (1983)
- 8023: Richie Cole – Return to Alto Acres (1982)
- 8024: Free Flight– The Jazz/Classic Union (1982)
- 8025: Scott Scheer – Rappin' It Up (1982)
- 8026: Dianne Reeves – Welcome to My Love (1982)
- 8027: David Lahm – Real Jazz for the Folks Who Feel Jazz (1982)
- 8028: Jimmy Rowles, McCoy Tyner, Herbie Hancock, John Lewis, Dave McKenna – Bill Evans: A Tribute (1982)
- 8029: Continuum – Mad About Tadd (1982) featuring Slide Hampton, Jimmy Heath, Kenny Barron, Ron Carter
- 8030: Mary Watkins – Winds of Change (1981)
- 8031: John Abercrombie – Solar (1984)
- 8032: Various Artists – Mistletoe Magic (1981, 1982, 1983)
- 8033: Arnie Lawrence – Renewal (1981)
- 8034: Linda Hopkins – How Blue Can You Get (1982)
- 8035: George Howard – Asphalt Gardens (1982)
- 8036: Richie Cole – Alto Annie's Theme (1982?)
- 8037: David Diggs – Realworld (1983)
- 8038: Sheila Jordan & Harvie Swartz – Old Time Feeling (1982)
- 8039: Elvin Jones – Brother John (1982) with Pat LaBarbera, Kenny Kirkland, Reggie Workman
- 8041: Richie Cole – Yakety Madness (1982)
- 8042: Larry Vuckovich – Cast Your Fate
- 8043: David Friesen – Amber Skies (1983)
- 8044: Denny Zeitlin – Tidal Wave (1981, 1983)
- 8046: Teo Macero – Impressions of Charles Mingus (1983)
- 8047: Various Artists – More Mistletoe Magic (1985)
- 8048: Doug Sertl – Uptown Express (1982)
- 8049: Dusan Bogdanovic – Early to Rise (1983)
- 8050: Free Flight – Soaring (1983)
- 8052: Maynard Ferguson – Storm (1982)
- 8053: Victor Feldman – Secret of the Andes (1982)
- 8054: Victor Feldman – Soft Shoulder (1982)
- 8055: Lalo Schifrin – Ins and Outs (1982)
- 8056: Victor Feldman – To Chopin With Love (1983)
- 8057: C'est What?– Eight Stories (1983)
- 8061: Quest – Quest (1981)
- 8070: Richie Cole – Bossa Nova Eyes
- 8074: Rob McConnell – All in Good Time (1982)
- 8075: Free Flight – Beyond the Clouds (1984)
- 8076: Northwind – Circles in the Fire (1984)
- 8077: Maynard Ferguson – Live from San Francisco (1983)
- 8078: Bobbe Norris – Hoisted Sails (1983)
- 8080: Various Artists – Jazz Monterey (1958–1980)
- 8081: Sammy Nestico – Dark Orchid (1982)
- 8083: McCoy Tyner – Just Feelin' (1985)
- 8084: Phil Woods – Live from New York (1982)
- 8086: Rare Silk – American Eyes (1985)
