= Alvin Hayes =

American jazz musician

Alvin Hayes is an American jazz saxophonist and flautist.

Hayes' album Star Gaze reached No. 21 on the contemporary jazz album chart at Billboard magazine, while Passion Flower reached No. 13. Hayes's band included guitarist Scott Carter, who recorded with him for both the TBA and Palo Alto labels.

== Discography ==
- 1987: Star Gaze (TBA Records)
- 1988: Passion Flower (Palo Alto)
- 1989: All the Way (TBA Records)
