= Trailways Express =

Studio album by Philly Joe Jones
- Released: 1971
- Recorded: October 1 and 31, 1968
- Studio: Trident Studios, London, England
- Genre: Jazz
- Length: 37:48
- Label: Black Lion; BL-142
- Producer: Alan Bates

Philly Joe Jones chronology
Together! (1961)	Trailways Express (1971)	Philly Joe Jones (1969)

Trailways Express (also released as Gone, Gone, Gone and Mo Joe) is an album by drummer Philly Joe Jones which was recorded in London in 1968 and released on the Black Lion label in 1971.

== Reception ==
Professional ratings
Review scores
Source	Rating
AllMusic	3/5 stars

The AllMusic review by Scott Yanow stated "the music is generally straightahead hard bop. Drummer Philly Joe Jones, who has short solos on each of the six selections, is a dominant force even when playing brushes in the ensembles".

== Track listing ==
1. "Mo' Joe" (Joe Henderson) – 4:29
2. "Gone. Gone, Gone" (George Gershwin, Ira Gershwin) – 8:23
3. "Baubles, Bangles, & Beads" (Robert Wright, George Forrest, Alexander Borodin) – 6:27
4. "Trailways Express" (Jones) – 4:02
5. "Here's That Rainy Day (Jimmy Van Heusen, Johnny Burke) – 9:07
6. "Ladybird" (Tadd Dameron) – 5:20

== Personnel ==
- Philly Joe Jones – drums
- Les Condon – trumpet (track 4)
- Kenny Wheeler – trumpet, flugelhorn (tracks 1, 2, 5 & 6)
- Chris Pyne – trombone
- Peter King – alto saxophone
- Harold McNair – tenor saxophone, flute
- Mike Pyne – piano
- John Hart (track 4), Ron Mathewson (tracks 1–3, 5 & 6) – bass
