= Rare Silk =

American vocal jazz group

- Origin: Boulder, Colorado, U.S.
- Genres: Vocal jazz, swing
- Years active: 1979–1988
- Labels: Polydor, Palo Alto
- Past members: Gaile Gillaspie; MaryLynn Gillaspie; Marguerite Juenemann; Todd Buffa; Barbara Reeves; Jamie Broumas

Rare Silk was an American vocal jazz group that was active during the 1980s.

MaryLynn Gillaspie and her sister, Gaile, grew up in southern California. Their father played trumpet, and from an early age they heard big band music and Ella Fitzgerald. In 1978, they were working as waitresses in Boulder, Colorado, with Gaile also singing at a local club. After they met another singer, Marguerite Juenemann, they formed Rare Silk. They sang on a local radio station and in clubs, sometimes dressed like the Andrews Sisters.

In 1980, they were the opening act for Benny Goodman at the 1980 Playboy Jazz Festival. After male vocalist Todd Buffa joined the group, they moved away from singing jazz standards and explored new approaches. As MaryLynn explained, "Todd has his own way of putting harmonies together", different from more traditional jazz harmonizations. They recorded their first album, New Weave, in 1983. This album was nominated for two Grammy Awards. It was followed by American Eyes, which was released in 1985, and Black and Blue, in 1986. MaryLynn explained their non-traditional musical style by noting their touring habit of listening to all kinds of music while travelling between shows and incorporating whatever they thought was good, such as David Bowie, Talking Heads, and Culture Club, into their improvisations.

Juenemann left the group and was replaced by Barbara Reeves and then by Jamie Broumas. The band broke up in 1988.

== Discography ==
Studio albums

- New Weave (Polydor, 1983)
- American Eyes (Palo Alto, 1985)
- Black and Blue (1986)

Live albums

- Live at Aurex (1980)
- Rare Silk At Duke's Place (1984)
