= Shut Yo' Mouth! =

Studio album by Slam Stewart and Major Holley
- Released: 1981
- Recorded: Dec. 6, 1981
- Genre: Jazz
- Length: 39:19
- Label: PM Records; Delos Records

Shut Yo' Mouth is a 1981 collaboration album by bassists Major Holley and Slam Stewart, released on PM Records and Delos Records.

== Track listing ==
1. "Tomorrow"
2. "I Love You"
3. "Would You Like To Take A Walk"
4. "Side By Side"
5. "Close Your Eyes"
6. "Undecided"
7. "Wrap Your Troubles In Dreams"
8. "Misty"
9. "My Blue Heaven"

== Personnel ==
- Bass, Vocals – Major Holley, Slam Stewart
- Drums – Oliver Jackson
- Piano, Organ – Dick Hyman
