= Mr. Jones (Elvin Jones album) =

Studio album by Elvin Jones
- Released: 1973
- Recorded: September 26, 1969; July 12–13, 1972
- Studio: Van Gelder Studio, Englewood Cliffs, NJ
- Genre: Jazz
- Length: 38:19
- Label: Blue Note; BN-LA 110-F
- Producer: Francis Wolff, George Butler

Elvin Jones chronology
Merry-Go-Round (1971)	Mr. Jones (1973)	Live at the Lighthouse (1972)

Mr. Jones is an album by American jazz drummer Elvin Jones recorded in 1972 and released on the Blue Note label in 1973. The track "G. G." was erroneously listed on the original LP as "Gee Gee".

== Reception ==
The Allmusic review awarded the album 4½ stars.

Professional ratings
Review scores
Source	Rating
Allmusic	4.5/5 stars

== Track listing ==
1. "One's Native Place" (Keiko Jones) - 6:16
2. "G. G." (Gene Perla) - 5:45
3. "Mr. Jones" (Jones) - 7:34
4. "What's Up? - That's It" (Perla) - 5:37
5. "Soultrane" (Tadd Dameron) - 6:12
6. "New Breed" (Dave Liebman) - 6:55

Recorded on September 26, 1969 (track 3), July 12, 1972 (tracks 4, 6), July 13, 1972 (tracks 1, 2, 5)

== Personnel ==
- Elvin Jones - drums
- Dave Liebman - tenor saxophone (2, 6), soprano saxophone (4), flute (1)
- Steve Grossman - tenor saxophone (2, 4–6), soprano saxophone (1)
- Jan Hammer - piano
- Gene Perla - bass (1, 3–6), electric bass (2)
- Carlos "Patato" Valdes - congas (1, 4)
- Frank Ippolito - percussion (1, 4, 5)
- Pepper Adams - baritone saxophone (4)
- Thad Jones - flugelhorn (1–3, 5)
- Albert Duffy - timpani (1–3, 5)
