= Poly-Currents =

Studio album by Elvin Jones
- Released: June 1970
- Recorded: September 26, 1969
- Studio: Van Gelder, Englewood Cliffs, NJ
- Genre: Jazz
- Length: 39:16
- Label: Blue Note; BST 84331
- Producer: Francis Wolff

Elvin Jones chronology
The Ultimate (1968)	Poly-Currents (1970)	Coalition (1970)

Poly-Currents is an album by American jazz drummer Elvin Jones, recorded in 1969 and released on the Blue Note label. Some of the musicians include tenor saxophonists Joe Farrell and George Coleman, baritone saxophonist Pepper Adams, conguero Candido Camero and bassist Wilbur Little.

== Reception ==
The AllMusic review by Scott Yanow called it "advanced modal hard bop with all of the musicians playing in top form". Harvey Pekar, in a contemporary review for DownBeat, awarded the album four stars, writing this album had "much to recommend it but still leaves something to be desired" compared to Jones' prior Blue Note albums.

Professional ratings
Review scores
Source	Rating
AllMusic	4.5/5 stars
DownBeat	4/5 stars

== Track listing ==
1. "Agenda" (Elvin Jones) - 13:50
2. "Agappe Love" (Joe Farrell) - 5:52
3. "Mr. Jones" (Keiko Jones) - 7:37
4. "Yes" (Fred Tompkins) - 2:23
5. "Whew" (Wilbur Little) - 9:34

== Personnel ==
- Elvin Jones - drums
- Fred Tompkins - flute (5)
- George Coleman - tenor saxophone (1–4)
- Joe Farrell - tenor saxophone, English horn, flute, bass flute
- Pepper Adams - baritone saxophone (1–3)
- Wilbur Little - bass
- Candido Camero - congas (1–3)
