= Merry-Go-Round (Elvin Jones album) =

Studio album by Elvin Jones
- Released: 1972
- Recorded: February 12, 1971 & December 16, 1971
- Studios: Van Gelder, Englewood Cliffs, NJ
- Genre: Jazz
- Length: 32:06
- Labels: Blue Note; BST 84414
- Producer: George Butler

Elvin Jones chronology
| Genesis (1971) | Merry-Go-Round (1972) | Mr. Jones (1972) |

Merry-Go-Round is an album by American jazz drummer Elvin Jones recorded in 1971 and released on the Blue Note label.

== Reception ==
The AllMusic review by Scott Yanow stated that "the music is generally quite worthwhile, if a bit eclectic... An interesting set, but Elvin Jones has recorded many more rewarding albums".

Professional ratings
Review scores
| Source | Rating |
|---|---|
| AllMusic | 3/5 stars |
| DownBeat | 4.5/5 stars |

== Track listing ==
1. "'Round Town" (Gene Perla) - 3:25
2. "Brite Piece" (Dave Liebman) - 4:46
3. "Lungs" (Jan Hammer) - 2:25
4. "A Time for Love" (Johnny Mandel, Paul Francis Webster) - 4:48
5. "Tergiversation" (Perla) - 3:27
6. "La Fiesta" (Chick Corea) - 6:05
7. "The Children's Merry-Go-Round March" (Keiko Jones) - 2:50
8. "Who's Afraid..." (Frank Foster) - 4:20

Recorded on February 12 (8) and December 16 (1–7), 1971.

== Personnel ==
- Elvin Jones - drums, leader
- Joe Farrell - soprano saxophone (2, 6, 8), tenor saxophone (1), flute (4), piccolo (7)
- Steve Grossman - soprano saxophone (2, 7), tenor saxophone (1, 6)
- Dave Liebman - tenor saxophone (1, 6, 8), soprano saxophone (2, 6, 7)
- Frank Foster - alto clarinet (8)
- Pepper Adams - baritone saxophone (6, 7)
- Chick Corea - piano (4–6), electric piano (5)
- Jan Hammer - electric piano (1, 5), piano (2, 3), glockenspiel (7)
- Yoshiaki Masuo - guitar (1, 4)
- Gene Perla - bass (2–5), electric bass (1, 6, 7)
- Don Alias - congas (1, 3, 5, 6), oriental bells (2)
