= Mad Thad =

Studio album by Thad Jones
- Released: 1957
- Recorded: December 24, 1956; January 6, 1957
- Genre: Jazz
- Length: 46:14
- Label: Period

Thad Jones chronology
| The Magnificent Thad Jones (1956) | Mad Thad (1957) | The Jones Boys (1957) |

Alternative cover
- Pye / Nixa Jazz Today Series (Europe)

Professional ratings
Review scores
| Source | Rating |
|---|---|
| AllMusic | 3/5 stars |
| The Penguin Guide to Jazz Recordings | 3.5/4 stars |

Mad Thad is a hardbop jazz album by Thad Jones recorded in 1957 for Period Records.

== Track listing ==
1. Whisper Not (Benny Golson) – 5:35
2. Quiet Sip (Thad Jones) – 9:01
3. Ballad Medley:
  - Flamingo (Ted Grouya, Edmund Anderson) – 1:59
  - If You Were Mine (Johnny Mercer, Matty Malneck) – 1:31
  - I'm Through With Love (Johnny Mercer, Gus Kahn and Joseph A. "Fud" Livingston) – 1:40
  - Love Walked In (George Gershwin, Ira Gershwin) – 2:10
4. Cat Meets Chick (Leonard Feather) – 5:22
5. Bird Song (Thad Jones) – 8:21
6. Jumping For Jane (Jane Feather) – 5:31
7. Mad Thad (Quincy Jones) – 4:39

== Personnel ==
24 December 1956 Session: (Tracks 1,6,7)

- Thad Jones – Trumpet, Composer
- Jimmy Jones – Piano
- Frank Foster – Sax, (Tenor)
- Doug Watkins – Bass
- Jo Jones – Drums
- Quincy Jones – Arranger, Conductor on 1,7

6 January 1957 Session: (Tracks 2,3,4,5)

- Thad Jones – Trumpet, Composer
- Frank Wess – Sax, (Tenor), Flute
- Henry Coker – Trombone
- Tommy Flanagan – Piano
- Jimmy Jones – Piano
- Eddie Jones – Bass
- Elvin Jones – Drums
