= Heart to Heart (Elvin Jones album) =

Studio album by Elvin Jones
- Released: 1981
- Recorded: August 1980; New York City
- Genre: Jazz
- Length: 39:50
- Label: Denon; YF 7017

Elvin Jones chronology
Soul Train (1980)	Heart to Heart (1981)	Earth Jones (1982)

Professional ratings
Review scores
Source	Rating
Allmusic	4/5 stars

Heart to Heart is an album of jazz standards by drummer Elvin Jones recorded in 1980 and released on the Japanese Denon label.

== Track listing ==
1. "Yesterdays" (Otto Harbach, Jerome Kern) - 5:45
2. "If I Were a Bell" (Frank Loesser) - 6:32
3. "Moon River" (Henry Mancini, Johnny Mercer) - 7:57
4. "Warm Valley" (Duke Ellington) - 12:06
5. "Joash" (Richard Davis) - 7:30

== Personnel ==
- Elvin Jones - drums
- Tommy Flanagan - piano
- Richard Davis - bass
