= Together! (Elvin Jones and Philly Joe Jones album) =

Studio album by Philly Joe Jones and Elvin Jones
- Released: 1964
- Recorded: February 2, 1961; New York City
- Genre: Jazz
- Length: 33:51
- Label: Atlantic; 1428
- Producer: Nesuhi Ertegun

Elvin Jones chronology
Keepin' Up with the Joneses (1958)	Together! (1964)	Elvin! (1961)

Philly Joe Jones chronology
Philly Joe's Beat (1960)	Together! (1961)	Trailways Express (1968)

Together! is a jazz album by drummers ”Philly” Joe Jones and Elvin Jones recorded in 1961 and released on the Atlantic label. It features trumpeter Blue Mitchell, trombonist Curtis Fuller, tenor saxophonist Hank Mobley, pianist Wynton Kelly and bassist Paul Chambers.

== Track listing ==
1. "Le Roi" (Dave Baker) - 6:00
2. "Beau-ty" (Philly Joe Jones) - 12:53
3. "Brown Sugar" (Walter Davis, Jr.) - 14:58

== Personnel ==
- Philly Joe Jones - drums
- Elvin Jones - drums
- Blue Mitchell - trumpet
- Curtis Fuller - trombone
- Hank Mobley - tenor saxophone
- Wynton Kelly - piano
- Paul Chambers - bass
