= Manhattan Fever =

Studio album by Frank Foster
- Released: 1968
- Recorded: March 21, 1968; January 31, 1969 (bonus tracks)
- Genre: Jazz
- Length: 41:37
- Label: Blue Note
- Producer: Duke Pearson

Frank Foster chronology
Soul Outing! (1966)	Manhattan Fever (1968)	The Loud Minority (1974)

Manhattan Fever is an album by American jazz saxophonist Frank Foster recorded in 1968 and released on the Blue Note label. The CD reissue added five previously unreleased recordings from a 1969 session as bonus tracks.

== Reception ==
The Allmusic review by Steve Leggett awarded the album 3 stars and stated "Foster's compositional and arranging talents are at center stage, but when he steps out front as a soloist like he does on "The House That Love Built," he shows why he is a top line tenor sax player".

Professional ratings
Review scores
Source	Rating
Allmusic	3/5 stars
The Penguin Guide to Jazz Recordings	3/4 stars

== Track listing ==
All compositions by Frank Foster, except as indicated

1. "Little Miss No Nose" - 7:01
2. "Manhattan Fever" - 10:33
3. "Loneliness" - 2:58
4. "Stammpede" - 5:46
5. "You Gotta Be Kiddin'" - 3:29
6. "Seventh Avenue Bill" (Bill English) - 11:50
7. "Slug's Bag" (Mickey Tucker) - 7:07 Bonus track on CD reissue
8. "What's New from the Monster Mill" - 9:24 Bonus track on CD reissue
9. "Hip Shakin'" - 7:26 Bonus track on CD reissue
10. "The House That Love Built" - 3:29 Bonus track on CD reissue
11. "Fly by Night" (Rahsaan Roland Kirk) - 6:41 Bonus track on CD reissue

- Recorded at Rudy Van Gelder Studio, Englewood Cliffs, New Jersey on March 21, 1968 (tracks 1–6) and January 31, 1969 (tracks 7–11).

== Personnel ==
- Frank Foster - tenor saxophone, alto clarinet
- Marvin Stamm - trumpet (tracks 1, 2 & 4–6)
- Burt Collins - trumpet, piccolo trumpet (tracks 7–9 & 11)
- Garnett Brown (tracks 1, 2 & 4–6), Jimmy Cleveland (tracks 7–9 & 11) - trombone
- Kenny Rogers - baritone saxophone
- Ed Pazant - alto saxophone, flute, oboe (tracks 7–9 & 11)
- Richard Wyands (tracks 1–6), George Cables (tracks 7–11) - piano
- Bob Cranshaw - bass, electric bass (tracks 1–6)
- Buster Williams - bass (tracks 7–11)
- Mickey Roker - drums
