= Elvin! =

Studio album by Elvin Jones
- Released: 1962
- Recorded: July 11, 1961; December 27, 1961; January 3, 1962
- Studio: Plaza Sound, New York City
- Genre: Jazz
- Length: 37:50
- Label: Riverside; RLP 409
- Producer: Orrin Keepnews

Elvin Jones chronology
Together! (1961)	Elvin! (1962)	Illumination! (1963)

Elvin! is a jazz album by drummer Elvin Jones, recorded in 1961 and 1962 and released on the Riverside label. It features Jones playing in a group with his brothers, trumpeter Thad (here playing cornet) and pianist Hank, along with tenor saxophonist Frank Foster, flautist Frank Wess and bassist Art Davis.

== Reception ==
Professional ratings
Review scores
Source	Rating
AllMusic	3.5/5 stars
DownBeat	4/5 stars
The Penguin Guide to Jazz Recordings	3/4 stars
The Rolling Stone Jazz Record Guide	4/5 stars

The AllMusic review called the music "straight-ahead with a strong Count Basie feel... Jones is still recognizable on the fairly obscure material (only 'You Are Too Beautiful' qualifies as a standard) and shows that he can cook in the fairly conventional setting. All of the musicians are in fine form."

== Track listing ==
1. "Lady Luck" (Thad Jones, Frank Wess) - 6:19
2. "Buzz-at" (Thad Jones) - 6:31
3. "Shadowland" (Sara Cassey) - 4:06
4. "Pretty Brown" (Ernie Wilkins) - 3:30
5. "Ray-El" (Thad Jones) - 8:03
6. "Four and Six" (Oliver Nelson) - 5:01
7. "You Are Too Beautiful" (Lorenz Hart, Richard Rodgers) - 4:20

== Personnel ==
- Elvin Jones - drums
- Thad Jones - cornet (tracks 1–3, 5 & 7)
- Frank Wess - flute (tracks 1–3, 5 & 7)
- Frank Foster - tenor saxophone (tracks 1–3 & 5)
- Hank Jones - piano
- Art Davis - bass
