= Elvin Jones Jazz Machine Live at Pit Inn =

Live album by Elvin Jones Jazz Machine
- Released: 1985
- Recorded: August 1, 1985
- Venue: Pit Inn, Tokyo, Japan
- Genre: Jazz
- Length: 57:35
- Label: Polydor (Japan); 28MJ 3528
- Producer: Keiko Jones

Elvin Jones chronology
Live at the Village Vanguard Volume One (1984)	Elvin Jones Jazz Machine Live at Pit Inn (1985)	Power Trio (1990)

Elvin Jones Jazz Machine Live at Pit Inn is a live album by drummer Elvin Jones' Jazz Machine recorded in Japan in 1984 and originally released on the Japanese Polydor label.

== Reception ==
The Allmusic review awarded the album three stars and stated "Live at Pit Inn is not an essential recording but a welcome addition to the extensive Jones discography".

Professional ratings
Review scores
Source	Rating
Allmusic	3/5 stars

== Track listing ==
1. "George and Me" (Elvin Jones) – 10:26
2. "Shinjitsu" (Keiko Jones) – 14:40
3. "My One and Only Love" (Guy Wood, Robert Mellin) – 12:44
4. "Zange" (Keiko Jones) – 13:56
5. "E.J.'s Blues" (Elvin Jones) – 5:49 Bonus track on CD

== Personnel ==
- Elvin Jones – drums
- Sonny Fortune – tenor saxophone, flute
- Pat LaBarbera – tenor saxophone, soprano saxophone
- Fumio Karashima – piano
- Richard Davis – bass
