= At This Point in Time =

Studio album by Elvin Jones
- Released: March 31, 1998
- Recorded: July 24–26, 1973
- Studio: A&R Recording Studios, New York City
- Genre: Jazz
- Length: 60:03
- Label: Blue Note
- Producer: Omar Clay

Elvin Jones chronology
Hollow Out (1972)	At This Point in Time (1998)	Mr. Thunder (1974)

At This Point in Time is an album by an eleven-piece band led by jazz drummer Elvin Jones that was recorded in 1973 and released in 1998.

== Track listing ==
1. "At This Point in Time" (Frank Foster) – 7:34
2. "Currents/Pollen" (Gene Perla, Don Garcia) – 11:13
3. "The Prime Element" (Omar Clay) – 8:19
4. "Whims of Bal" (Clay) – 12:23
5. "Pauke Tanz" (Clay) – 6:24
6. "The Unknighted Nations" (Foster) – 6:28
7. "Don't Cry (Keiko Jones) – 7:42

== Personnel ==
- Elvin Jones – drums
- Frank Foster – soprano and tenor saxophone
- Steve Grossman – soprano and tenor saxophone
- Pepper Adams – baritone saxophone
- Jan Hammer – piano, electric piano, synthesizer
- Cornell Dupree – guitar
- Gene Perla – double bass, bass guitar
- Warren Smith – tympani
- Omar Clay – percussion, programmable rhythm box
- Candido Camero – congas
- Richie "Pablo" Landrum – percussion
