= The Truth: Heard Live at the Blue Note =

Live album by Elvin Jones
- Released: 2004
- Recorded: September 11–12, 1999
- Venue: Blue Note Jazz Club, Greenwich Village, New York City
- Genre: Jazz
- Length: 60:54
- Label: Half Note; HN 4519

Elvin Jones chronology
Momentum Space (1999)	The Truth: Heard Live at the Blue Note (2004)

The Truth: Heard Live at the Blue Note is a live album by jazz drummer Elvin Jones, recorded in 1999 and released on the Half Note label in 2004.

== Reception ==
The AllMusic review stated, "All of the musicians are in top form and were clearly inspired to be playing with Elvin Jones. Although falling short of being a classic, this set has many bright moments". The All About Jazz review stated, "The Truth is one of Jones' last recorded performances, certainly his last as a leader. It is a fitting epitaph to an artist who inspired legions of drummers and, with Coltrane, helped push forward the boundaries of modern music. He is missed" The JazzTimes review stated, "Recorded in 1999, when he was at full strength, this was a night for hard blowing at the Blue Note... The Truth preserves one ordinary night in a club among thousands in the career of Elvin Jones, and it is important enough".

Professional ratings
Review scores
Source	Rating
AllMusic	4/5 stars
The Penguin Guide to Jazz Recordings	3/4 stars

== Track listing ==
All compositions by Elvin Jones except as indicated

1. "E.J.'s Blues" - 8:13
2. "Straight No Chaser" (Thelonious Monk) - 7:35
3. "Body and Soul" (Edward Heyman, Robert Sour, Frank Eyton, Johnny Green) - 9:53
4. "Truth" (Keiko Jones) - 7:25
5. "A Lullaby of Itsugo Village" (Traditional) - 7:40
6. "Wise One" (John Coltrane) - 12:16
7. "Three Card Molly" - 7:52

== Personnel ==
- Elvin Jones - drums
- Darren Barrett - trumpet
- Robin Eubanks - trombone
- Michael Brecker - saxophone
- Antoine Roney - saxophone
- Carlos McKinney - piano
- Gene Perla - bass
- Steven Bensusan - executive producer
- Andy Bigan - assistant
- Greg Calbi - mastering
- Chaz Clifton - assistant
- Jon D'Uva - digital editing
- Jack Kreisberg - audio production, producer
- Steve Remote - audio engineer, coordination, engineer, mixing
