= Puttin' It Together =

Studio album by Elvin Jones Trio
- Released: September 1968
- Recorded: April 8, 1968
- Studio: Van Gelder, Englewood Cliffs, NJ
- Genre: Jazz
- Length: 41:36
- Label: Blue Note; BST 84282
- Producer: Duke Pearson

Elvin Jones chronology
Heavy Sounds (1967)	Puttin' It Together (1968)	The Ultimate (1968)

Puttin' It Together is an album by American jazz drummer Elvin Jones. It is his first effort for Blue Note as a leader, and the first to feature his trio with saxophonist/flautist Joe Farrell and bassist Jimmy Garrison. It was recorded and released in 1968.

== Reception ==
The AllMusic review by Scott Yanow stated, "Joe Farrell did some of his finest playing while with drummer Elvin Jones' trio during 1968-69... With Jones pushing him and Garrison sounding quite advanced, Farrell was consistently inspired to play at the peak of his creativity".

Professional ratings
Review scores
Source	Rating
AllMusic	4/5 stars
DownBeat	5/5 stars
The Rolling Stone Jazz Record Guide	4/5 stars

== Track listing ==
1. "Reza" (Ruy Guerra, Edu Lobo) - 7:14
2. "Sweet Little Maia" (Jimmy Garrison) - 7:54
3. "Keiko's Birthday March" (Elvin Jones) - 6:55
4. "Village Greene" (Billy Greene) - 5:13
5. "Jay-Ree" (Joe Farrell) - 3:52
6. "For Heaven's Sake" (Elise Bretton, Sherman Edwards, Donald Meyer) - 5:10
7. "Ginger Bread Boy" (Jimmy Heath) - 5:18

== Personnel ==
- Elvin Jones - drums
- Joe Farrell - tenor saxophone, soprano saxophone, flute, piccolo
- Jimmy Garrison - bass
