= Márcio Montarroyos =

Brazilian musician

Márcio Montarroyos (8 July 1948 – 12 December 2007) was a Brazilian jazz trumpet player.

== Biography ==
Starting his studies with classical piano, he later went to trumpet and jazz. In the 1970s, he traveled to the US to study at the Berklee School of Music. In 1988, Swiss television invited Montarroyos to produce two one-hour concerts together with German guitar player Sigi Schwab, bassist Marc Egan, percussionist Freddie Santiago and drummer Guillermo Marchena. In 1992, German TV network ZDF invited him, together with Sigi Schwab, to play a live concert. In the same year both artists played at the Munich Studio 2000+2 .

He played with artists including Stevie Wonder, Sérgio Mendes, Sarah Vaughan, Hermeto Pascoal, Nancy Wilson, Egberto Gismonti, Carlos Santana, Milton Nascimento, Ella Fitzgerald, Tom Jobim and Ney Matogrosso.

Montarroyos died on 12 December 2007 of lung cancer.

== Discography ==
- Sessão nostalgia (1973)
- Stone Alliance (1977) PM Records
- Trompete internacional (1981)
- Magic moment (1982)
- Carioca (1984)
- Samba Solstice (1987)
- Terra mater (1989)
- Marcio Montarroyos (1995)
