= In Europe (Elvin Jones album) =

Live album by Elvin Jones
- Released: 1992
- Recorded: June 23, 1991; Jazz an der Donau Festival, Vilshofen, West Germany
- Genre: Jazz
- Length: 62:55
- Label: Enja; ENJ 7009-2

Elvin Jones chronology
| When I Was at Aso-Mountain (1990) | In Europe (1992) | Youngblood (1992) |

In Europe is a live album by jazz drummer Elvin Jones recorded in 1991 in Vilshofen, West Germany and released on the Enja label.

== Reception ==
The Allmusic review stated "Recorded live at a jazz festival in Germany, In Europe represents a typical Jazz Machine live performance, three selections from the group's regular repertoire where the musicians get plenty of room to stretch out, fueled by Jones' propulsive polyrhythms".

Professional ratings
Review scores
| Source | Rating |
|---|---|
| Allmusic | 4.5/5 stars |

== Track listing ==
1. "Ray" (Thad Jones) - 17:40
2. "Doll of the Bride" (Traditional arranged by Keiko Jones) - 32:45
3. "Island Birdie" (McCoy Tyner) - 13:02

== Personnel ==
- Elvin Jones - drums
- Sonny Fortune - tenor saxophone, flute
- Ravi Coltrane - tenor saxophone, soprano saxophone
- Willie Pickens - piano
- Chip Jackson - bass
