= Brother John (album) =

Studio album by Elvin Jones
- Released: 1984
- Recorded: October 1982
- Studio: Mediasound, New York City
- Genre: Jazz
- Label: Palo Alto
- Producer: Herb Wong

Professional ratings
Review scores
Source	Rating
AllMusic	3/5 stars
The Penguin Guide to Jazz Recordings	2/4 stars
The Rolling Stone Jazz Record Guide	4/5 stars

Brother John is an album by jazz drummer Elvin Jones, recorded in October 1982 and released on Palo Alto Records in 1984.

== Track listing ==
All songs written by Pat LaBarbera, except where noted

Side one

1. "Necessary Evil" – 4:08
2. "October's Child" – 5:16
3. "Harmonique" (John Coltrane) – 4:52
4. "Whatever Possessed Me" (Tadd Dameron) – 6:12

Side two

1. "Familiar Ground" – 4:23
2. "Why Try to Change Me Now" (Cy Coleman - J.A. McCarthy) – 5:55
3. "Minor Blues" – 6:18
4. "Brother John" – 4:18

== Personnel ==
- drums - Elvin Jones
- tenor saxophone and soprano - Pat LaBarbera
- piano - Kenny Kirkland
- bass - Reggie Workman
- producer - Herb Wong
- associate producer - Pat LaBarbera
- engineer - Carl Beatty, Andy Hoffman
