= Darren Barrett =

Canadian jazz musician

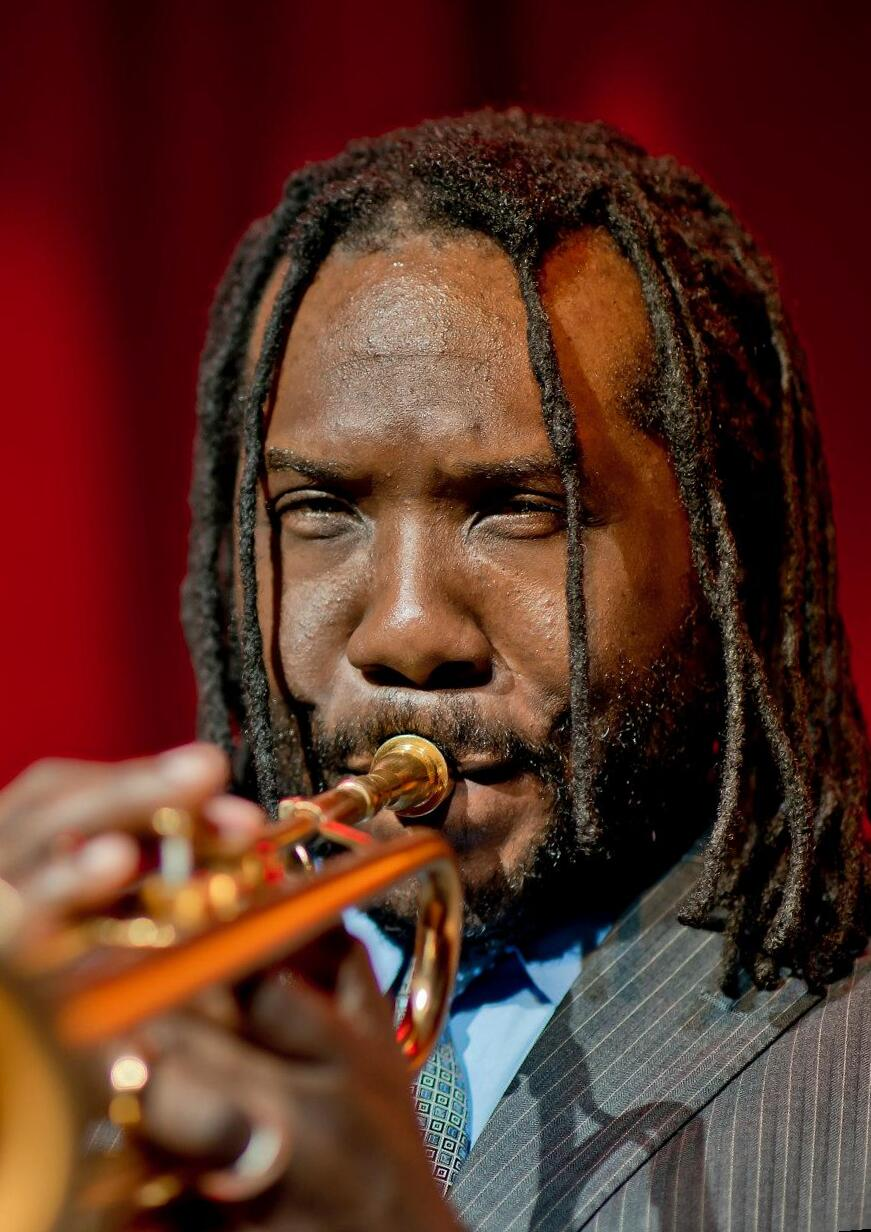
- Darren Barrett, in 2011

Background information
- Born: Darren Barrett
- Genres: Jazz, Pop, Reggae, R&B, Jazz Fusion, Jazz-Funk
- Occupations: Musician, music educator, songwriter, bandleader, music producer, music engineer, photographer, videography
- Instruments: Trumpet, flugelhorn, EVI
- Years active: 1991–present
- Labels: JCurve, Nagel Heyer Records, dB Studios
- Website: http://www.darrenbarrett.com/

Darren Barrett is a Canadian jazz musician who won the 1997 Thelonious Monk International Jazz Competition, and is a professor at Berklee College of Music.

== Life and career ==
Canadian Grammy Award winning trumpet player Darren Barrett was born to Jamaican parents. Darren remembers that, "the first time I heard Miles Davis was on the record 'Round About Midnight, and when I heard Miles' sound and approach, I knew that the instrument I wanted to play was the trumpet."

Upon graduating high school, Barrett attended Humber College's Jazz program in Toronto, Ontario and eventually spent a year there and won the Boddington's Music Brass Award for excellence in performance. In 1986, Darren Barrett attended Berklee College of Music on a full scholarship, receiving a BA in Professional Music in 1990. He went on to receive an MA in Jazz Performance in 1993, and an MS in Music Education from Queens College, City University of New York in 1995. It was there that he came under the influence of Dr. Donald Byrd, who became something of a father figure for the young trumpeter. "My quest for a Doctorate degree was interrupted by a special program that was being developed, called the Thelonious Monk Institute of Jazz Performance, at the New England Conservatory of Music." In 1997, Barrett earned a Diploma in Jazz Performance from the Thelonious Monk Institute, where he was a member of the inaugural class and "studied with Barry Harris, Wynton Marsalis, and Clark Terry, getting the opportunity to perform alongside Herbie Hancock and Wayne Shorter". In 1997, Barrett entered and won first place in the Thelonious Monk International Jazz Competition, the biggest jazz competition in the world, which highlights a different instrument each year.

Barrett went on to release his first album as a bandleader, First One Up, in 1999, followed by Deelings in 2001, The Attack of Wren: Wrenaissance Volume 1 in 2004, and A Very Barrett Christmas in 2011. He has most recently released Energy In Motion: The Music Of The Bee Gees (2014) and Live And Direct 2014. Barrett has performed or recorded with Elvin Jones, Jackie McLean, Herbie Hancock, Roy Hargrove Big Band, Common, Will.i.am, Talib Kweli, Esperanza Spalding and Antonio Hart, among others.

Barrett is currently a Professor in the Ensemble department at his alma mater, Berklee College of Music in Boston, Massachusetts. "I'm working on my craft, trying to be as professional and proficient as I can be. I'm just trying to reach people with my music, trying to concentrate on myself as a performer, bandleader and composer. I have many different bands but they all give me the musical platform to pursue anything possible. I want to continue exploring music and the trumpet by being open to the gamut of creativity, incorporating electronics into live shows, and realizing that one must have a great product and a great live show. These are my key principles."

== Education ==
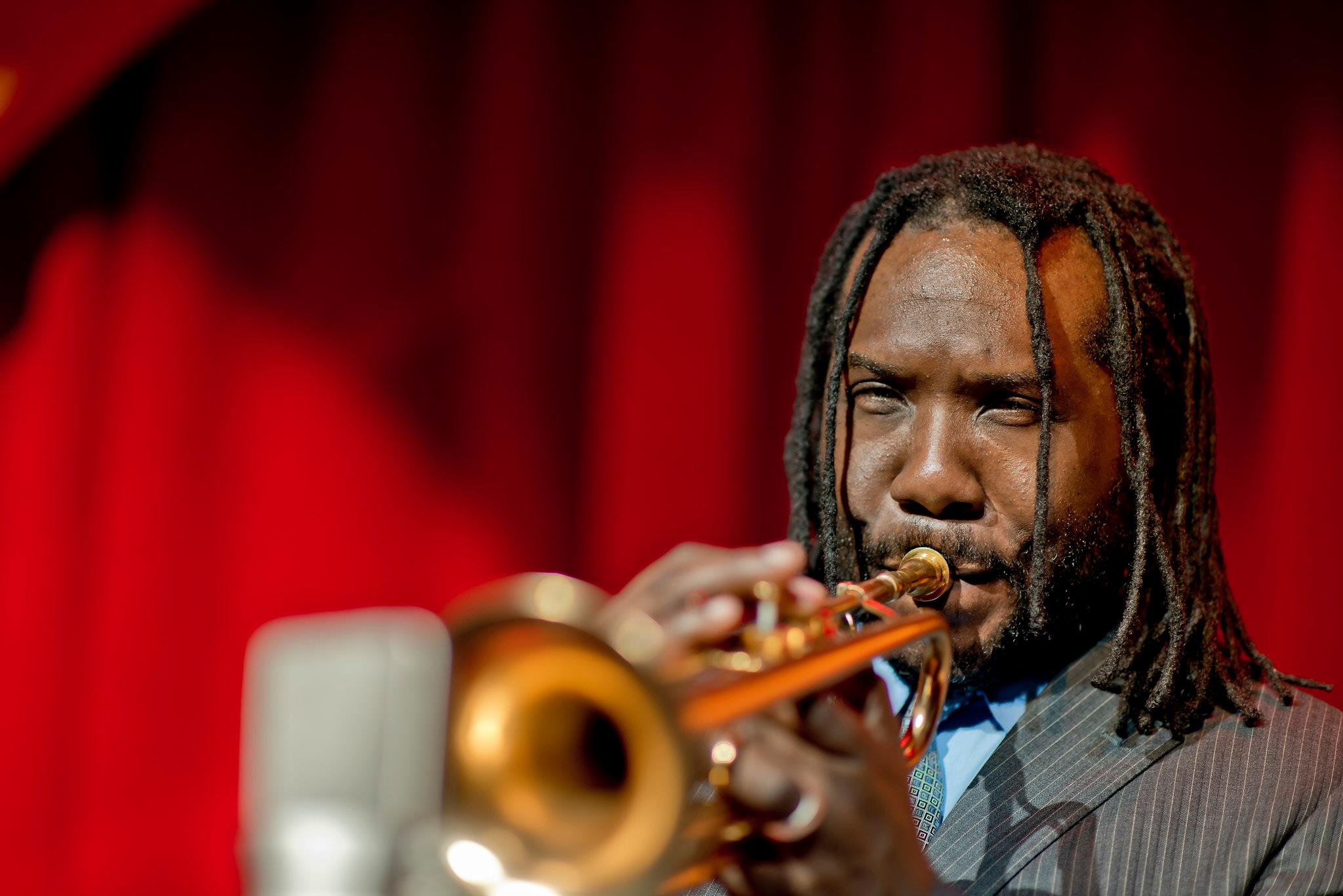
dB in Action

- BA in Professional Music from Berklee College of Music, 1990
- MA in Jazz Performance from Queens College, 1993
- MS in Music Education from Queens College, 1995
- Diploma in Jazz Performance from the Thelonious Monk Institute of Jazz, 1997

== Teachers ==
- Donald Byrd
- William Vacchiano
- William Fielder
- Bill Adam
- Charles Schlueter
- Don Johnson

== Awards ==
- Lennie Johnson Scholarship 1987
- Lennie Johnson Scholarship 1988
- Lennie Johnson Scholarship 1989
- Thelonious Monk International Trumpet Competition 1997 – 1st place

== Discography ==
=== As leader ===
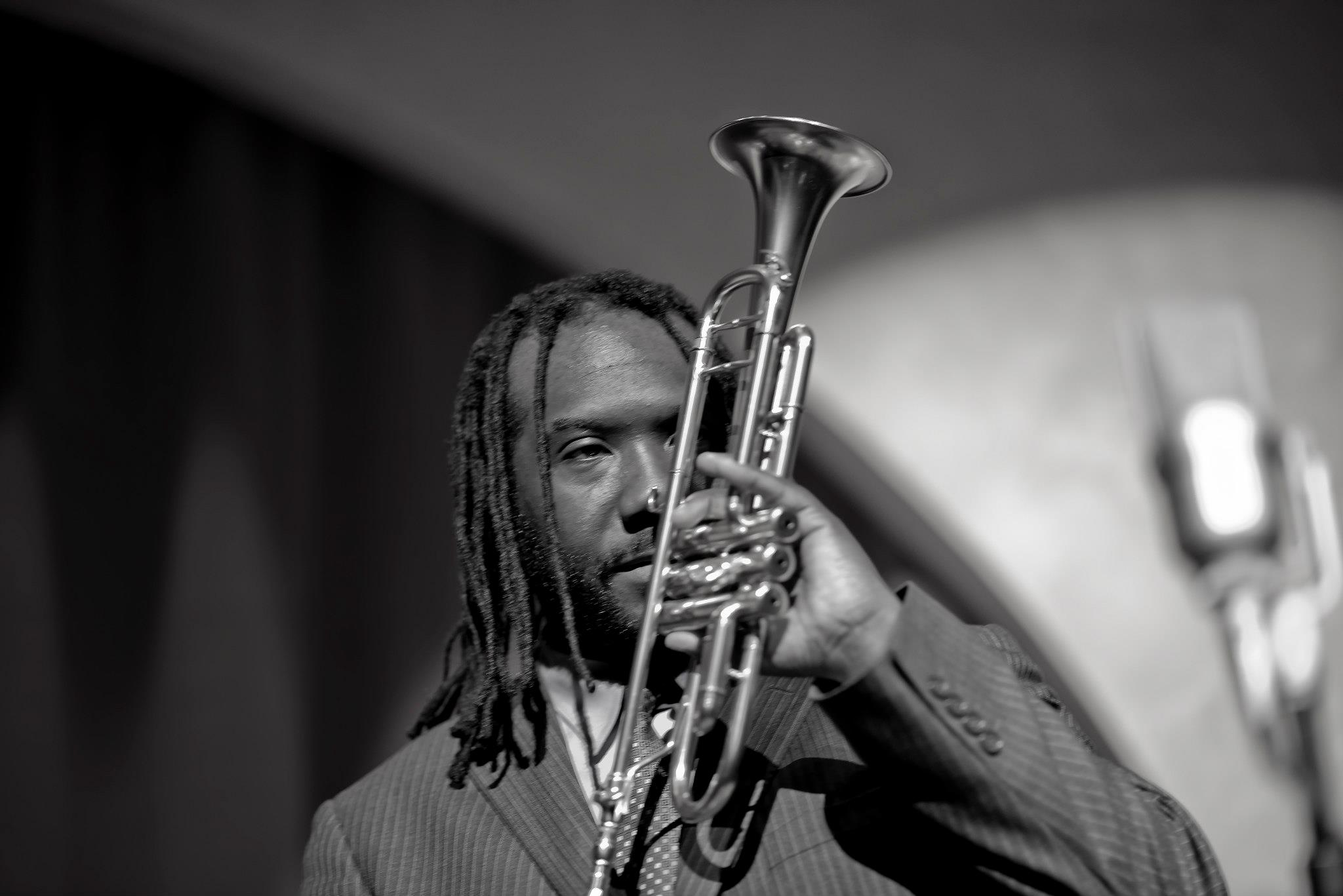
dB in Action

- First One Up (J Curve Records, 1999)
- Deelings (J Curve Records, 2001)
- The Attack of Wren: Wrenaissance, Volume 1 (Nagel Heyer Records, 2004)
- Darren Barrett A Very Barrett Christmas (dB Studios, 2011)
- Darren Barrett & Energy In Motion The Music Of The Bee Gees (dB Studios, 2014)
- Darren Barrett & dB Quintet, Live And Direct 2014 (dB Studios, 2014)
- Darren Barrett & Trumpet Vibes, Trumpet Vibes (dB Studios, 2015)
- Darren Barrett & Trumpet Vibes, The Music Of Amy Winehouse (dB Studios, 2016)
- Darren Barrett & dB-ish, The Opener (dB Studios, 2017)
- Darren Barrett & Time For Romance, But Beautiful (dB Studios, 2018)
- Darren Barrett & The EVI Sessions, Mr. Steiner (dB Studios, 2019)

=== As sideman ===
- Elvin Jones: The Truth: Heard Live at the Blue Note (Half Note, 1999)
- Roy Hargrove Big Band: Emergence (Emarcy, 2009)
- Esperanza Spalding: Radio Music Society (Heads Up *International, 2012)
- Myron Walden: Momentum Live: Our Sound (Demi Sound, 2013)
