= The Ultimate (Elvin Jones album) =

Studio album by Elvin Jones
- Released: August 1969
- Recorded: September 6, 1968
- Studio: Van Gelder, Englewood Cliffs, NJ
- Genre: Jazz
- Length: 36:48
- Label: Blue Note; BST 84305
- Producer: Duke Pearson

Elvin Jones chronology
Puttin' It Together (1968)	The Ultimate (1969)	Poly-Currents (1969)

The Ultimate is an album by American jazz drummer Elvin Jones, recorded in 1968 and released on the Blue Note label. It is his second album featuring his trio with saxophonist/flautist Joe Farrell and bassist Jimmy Garrison.

== Reception ==
The AllMusic review by Scott Yanow stated, "This is one of Joe Farrell's finest recordings. Switching between tenor, soprano and flute, Farrell had to be good because he was joined in the pianoless trio by bassist Jimmy Garrison and drummer Elvin Jones... Farrell is in consistently creative form but Garrison's occasional solos and Jones's polyrhythmic accompaniment are also noteworthy". Harvey Pekar, writing for DownBeat, awarded the album a perfect score in a contemporary review that praised the album's ingenuity and rich emotion.

Professional ratings
Review scores
Source	Rating
AllMusic	4.5/5 stars
DownBeat	5/5 stars
The Rolling Stone Jazz Record Guide	4/5 stars

== Track listing ==
1. "In the Truth" (Joe Farrell) - 5:04
2. "What Is This?" (Jimmy Garrison) - 7:09
3. "Ascendant" (Garrison) - 5:13
4. "Yesterdays" (Otto Harbach, Jerome Kern) - 5:39
5. "Sometimes Joie" (Garrison) - 10:38
6. "We'll Be Together Again" (Carl Fischer, Frankie Laine) - 3:05

== Personnel ==
- Elvin Jones – drums
- Joe Farrell – tenor saxophone, soprano saxophone, flute
- Jimmy Garrison – bass
