= Jamie Broumas =

American singer

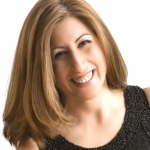

Background information
- Genres: Jazz
- Occupations: Singer, educator, administrator
- Website: www.jamiebroumas.com

Jamie Broumas (born 1959) is an American jazz singer, vocal instructor, and arts administrator. She lives outside of Washington D.C. and is the Director of The Fortas Chamber Music Concerts at The John F. Kennedy Center for the Performing Arts. She is the Chief Artistic Officer of Music Academy of the West.

== Biography ==
Broumas has appeared with many notable jazz musicians, including Cyrus Chestnut, Herb Ellis, Steve Williams, and Charlie Young. In addition to her solo career, she was a member of Mad Romance vocal quartet from 1983-1985 and of the Grammy-nominated jazz vocal group, Rare Silk from 1985-1986.

In the fall of 1986, she became an Orchestra Management Fellow at the American Symphony Orchestra League, where she worked with various orchestras, including the New York Philharmonic, The Houston Symphony, and the New Haven Symphony. She maintained a parallel career in arts management along with her singing, and she has worked at the John F. Kennedy Center for the Performing Arts since 1997, where she is the Director of the Fortas Chamber Music Concerts.

Broumas was nominated for a Washington Area Music Association WAMA Award in 2010 for Best Jazz Vocalist. She was also named Artist-in-Residence Mentor at the Strathmore Performing Arts Center for the 2010–2011 season.

== Education ==
Broumas received an A.B. in Music from Vassar College in 1981. She also attended Berklee College of Music in 1978.

== Discography ==
- Blue in Green (featuring Cyrus Chestnut), 1993
- Wild is Love, 2007
