= PM Records =

American jazz record label (founded 1973)

PM Records is a jazz label established by Gene Perla in 1973. PM released recordings by Dave Liebman, Steve Grossman, Elvin Jones, Bernie Senensky, Don Thompson, Pat LaBarbera, and Ed Bickert. Perla played bass on 31 of PM's 46 albums released to the end of 2018.

The first album pressing was limited to 500. It was followed by Steve Grossman's Some Shapes to Come.

Open Sky was a trio featuring Bob Moses, Dave Liebman and Frank Tusa. Stone Alliance featured Perla, Don Alias, and Steve Grossman.

== Discography ==
- PMR-001: Open Sky - Open Sky (1973)
- PMR-002: Steve Grossman - Some Shapes to Come (1974)
- PMR-003: Open Sky - Spirit in the Sky (1975)
- PMR-004: Elvin Jones - Live (1975)
- PMR-005: Elvin Jones - On the Mountain (1975)
- PMR-007: Doug Riley - Dreams (1976)
- PMR-008: Don Thompson - Country Place (1976)
- PMR-009: Pat LaBarbera - Pass It On (1976)
- PMR-010: Ed Bickert - Ed Bickert (1976)
- PMR-012: Steve Grossman - Terra Firma (1977)
- PMR-013: Stone Alliance - Stone Alliance (1976)
- PMR-014: Márcio Montarroyos - Stone Alliance (1977)
- PMR-016: Sonny Greenwich - Evol-ution, Love's Reverse (1979)
- PMR-017: Kathryn Moses - Music in My Heart (1979)
- PMR-018: Nina Simone - A Very Rare Evening (1979)
- PMR-020: Stone Alliance - Heads Up (1980)
- PMR-021: Bernie Senensky - Free Spirit
- PMR-022: David Liebman - Solo: Memories, Dreams and Reflections
- PMR-024: Slam Stewart & Major Holley - Shut Yo' Mouth!
