= Steve Grossman (saxophonist) =

American saxophonist (1951–2020)

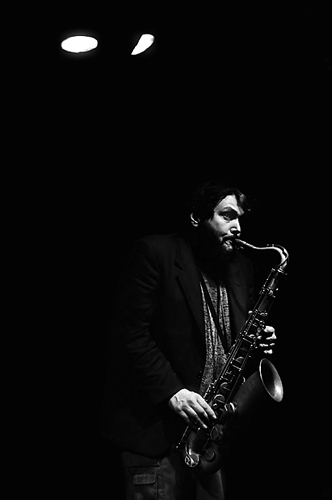
- Steve Grossman in Tromsø, Norway

Background information
- Born: Steven Mark Grossman; January 18, 1951; New York City, New York, U.S.
- Died: August 13, 2020 (aged 69)
- Genres: Jazz, cool jazz, jazz fusion, third stream
- Occupations: Musician, composer
- Instrument: Saxophone
- Years active: 1960s–2020
- Label: Blue Note
- Formerly of: Elvin Jones, Miles Davis, Gene Perla, Don Alias

Steven Mark Grossman (January 18, 1951 – August 13, 2020) was an American jazz fusion and hard bop saxophonist.

Grossman was Wayne Shorter's replacement in Miles Davis's jazz-fusion band. He played with Chick Corea on the album "The Sun" in 1970, then, from 1971 to 1973, he was in Elvin Jones's band.

In the late 1970s, he was part of the Stone Alliance trio with percussionist Don Alias and bassist Gene Perla. The group released four albums during this period, including one featuring Brazilian trumpeter Márcio Montarroyos. The albums also feature an array of other musicians. They went on to release three live reunion albums during the 2000s.

== Personal life ==
Grossman was born in Brooklyn, New York, United States, on January 18, 1951, to Rosalind, an amateur pianist, and Irving, an RCA salesman and later president of KLH Research and Development Corporation. He died of cardiac arrest in Glen Cove, New York, on August 13, 2020, at the age of 69.

== Discography ==
=== As leader ===
- 1974: Some Shapes to Come (PM Records, with Don Alias, Jan Hammer, Gene Perla)
- 1975: Jazz A Confronto 23 (Horo Records), with Alessio Urso, Afonso Vieira, Irio De Paula and Nilton Castro
- 1977: Terra Firma (PM Records)
- 1977: Born at the Same Time with Patrice Caratini, Michel Graillier, Daniel Humair
- 1978: New Moon (Musica)
- 1979: Perspective (Atlantic Records), with Mark Egan, Marcus Miller, Lenny White, Onaje Allan Gumbs
- 1984: Way Out East Vol 1 & 2 with Juini Booth, Joe Chambers
- 1984: Hold the Line with Juini Booth, Hugh Lawson, Masahiro Yoshida
- 1985: Love Is The Thing with Billy Higgins, Cedar Walton, David Williams
- 1985: Steve Grossman Quartet Vol 1 & 2
- 1985: Standards with Walter Booker, Fred Henke, Masahiro Yoshida
- 1986: Katonah
- 1989: Bouncing with Mr. A.T., with Tyler Mitchell, Art Taylor
- 1990: Moon Train
- 1990: Reflections
- 1990: Live: Cafe Praga
- 1990: My Second Prime
- 1991: Do It with Barry Harris, Reggie Johnson, Art Taylor
- 1991: In New York with Avery Sharpe, Art Taylor, McCoy Tyner
- 1993: Time to Smile with Tom Harrell, Elvin Jones, Cecil McBee, Willie Pickens
- 1992: I'm Confessin' with Jimmy Cobb, Fred Henke, Reggie Johnson, Harold Land
- 1993: Small Hotel with Billy Higgins, Cedar Walton, David Williams
- 1998: Steve Grossman Quartet with Michel Petrucciani with Joe Farnsworth, Andy McKee, Michel Petrucciani
- 2000: Johnny Griffin & Steve Grossman Quintet with Johnny Griffin, Michael Weiss, Pierre Michelot, Alvin Queen
- 2006: The Bible with Don Alias, Jan Hammer, Gene Perla

=== As sideman ===
With Miles Davis

- Miles Davis at Fillmore: Live at the Fillmore East (1970)
- A Tribute to Jack Johnson (1970)
- Live-Evil (1970)
- Black Beauty: Live at the Fillmore West (1973, recorded 1970)
- Big Fun (1974, recorded 1969–1972)
- Get Up with It (1974, recorded 1970–1974)
- Miles at the Fillmore – Miles Davis 1970: The Bootleg Series Vol. 3 (2014, recorded 1970)

With Elvin Jones

- Merry-Go-Round (Blue Note, 1971)
- Mr. Jones (Blue Note, 1972)
- Live at the Lighthouse (Blue Note, 1972)
- At This Point in Time (Blue Note, 1973)
- New Agenda (Vanguard, 1975)
- The Main Force (Vanguard, 1976)
