= Live at the Lighthouse (Elvin Jones album) =

Live album by Elvin Jones
- Released: Early January 1973
- Recorded: September 9, 1972
- Venue: Lighthouse Café, Hermosa Beach
- Genre: Jazz
- Length: 74:13
- Label: Blue Note; BN-LA 015-G2
- Producer: George Butler

Elvin Jones chronology
Mr. Jones (1972)	Live at the Lighthouse (1973)	Hollow Out (1972)

Live at the Lighthouse is a live album by jazz drummer Elvin Jones featuring performances recorded in 1972 at the Lighthouse Café in California, and released on the Blue Note label. The album was originally released as a double LP and subsequently released on two CDs with additional material. It features Jones in a quartet with saxophonists Dave Liebman and Steve Grossman, and bassist Gene Perla.

== Reception ==
The Allmusic review by Scott Yanow awarded the album 4 stars calling it "Exciting and adventurous music that stretches the boundaries of modal hard bop jazz".

Professional ratings
Review scores
Source	Rating
Allmusic	4/5 stars

== Track listing ==
Volume One

1. "Fancy Free" (Donald Byrd) - 21:06
2. "New Breed" (Dave Liebman) - 12:06
3. "Small One" (Liebman) - 7:09 Bonus track on CD reissue
4. "Sambra" (Gene Perla) - 13:12
5. "My Ship" (Ira Gershwin, Kurt Weill) - 8:52
6. "Taurus People" (Farouq Daweud) - 6:17 Bonus track on CD reissue
7. "For All Those Other Times / Announcement" (Perla) - 5:40 Bonus track on CD reissue

Volume Two

1. "Happy Birthday Greeting" - 0:50
2. "Sweet Mama" (Perla) - 15:30
3. "I'm a Fool to Want You" (Joel Herron, Frank Sinatra, Jack Wolf) - 11:37 Bonus track on CD reissue
4. "The Children, Save the Children" (Don Garcia) - 7:58
5. "Brite Piece" (Liebman) - 13:19 Bonus track on CD reissue
6. "The Children's Merry-Go-Round March" (Elvin Jones) - 28:30 Bonus track on CD reissue

== Personnel ==
- Elvin Jones - drums
- Steve Grossman - tenor saxophone, soprano saxophone
- Dave Liebman - tenor saxophone, soprano saxophone, flute
- Gene Perla - bass
