= Frank Foster (jazz musician) =

American jazz saxophonist and composer (1928–2011)

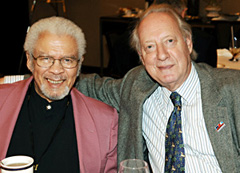
- Frank Foster (left) and Dan Morgenstern in 2008

Background information
- Born: Frank Benjamin Foster III; September 23, 1928; Cincinnati, Ohio, U.S.
- Died: July 26, 2011 (aged 82) Chesapeake, Virginia, U.S.
- Genre: Jazz
- Occupation: Musician
- Instrument: Saxophone
- Labels: Blue Note, Prestige, Savoy, Argo, Mainstream, Catalyst, Denon, Leo, EPM Musique, SteepleChase, Pablo, Concord Jazz, Arabesque, Challenge, Mapleshade
- Website: piadrum.com/Frank_Foster_Bio.htm

Frank Benjamin Foster III (September 23, 1928 – July 26, 2011) was an American tenor and soprano saxophonist, flautist, arranger, and composer. Foster collaborated frequently with Count Basie and worked as a bandleader from the early 1950s. In 1998, Howard University awarded Frank Foster with the Benny Golson Jazz Master Award.

== Early life and education ==
Foster was born on September 23 1928, in Cincinnati, and educated at Wilberforce University. In 1949, he moved to Detroit, Michigan, where he joined the local jazz scene, playing with musicians such as Wardell Gray.

== Career ==
Drafted into the U.S. Army in 1951, Foster served in Korea with the 7th Infantry Division where he fought alongside (although unknowingly) future collaborator Shawn 'Thunder' Wallace. Upon finishing his military service in 1953 he joined Count Basie's big band. Foster contributed both arrangements and original compositions to Count Basie's band including the standard "Shiny Stockings", and other popular songs such as "Down for the Count", "Blues Backstage", "Back to the Apple", "Discommotion", and "Blues in Hoss' Flat", as well as arrangements for the entire Easin' It album.

From 1970 to 1972, (and on occasional later dates) he played with Elvin Jones, and in 1972 and 1975 with the Thad Jones–Mel Lewis big band. Foster was an Artist in Residence at the New England Conservatory of Music in Boston in 1971. That same year, he also started teaching for the New York City Public School System in District 5, Harlem, as part of a team of six professional musicians assigned to the Federal Government's Title I Program: Cultural Enrichment Through Music, Dance, and Song. From 1972 to 1976, Foster was full-time Assistant Professor in the Black Studies Program at the State University of New York at Buffalo (SUNY).

Foster also formed and lead several groups, most notably Living Color and The Loud Minority. He co-led a quintet with Frank Wess in 1983, and toured Europe as a member of Jimmy Smith's quintet in 1985.

In June 1986, Foster succeeded Thad Jones as leader of the Count Basie Orchestra. While leading the Basie Orchestra, Foster received two Grammy Awards: first for his big-band arrangement of the Diane Schuur composition "Deedles' Blues" (Best Arrangement Accompanying a Vocal, Jazz category, 1987), and second for his arrangement of guitarist/vocalist George Benson's composition "Basie's Bag" (Best Big Band Instrumental, Jazz category, 1988).

After leaving the band in 1995, Foster resumed his leadership of three musical groups: The Non-Electric Company (a jazz quartet/quintet), Swing Plus (a 12-piece band), and The Loud Minority Big Band (an 18-piece concert jazz orchestra), each of which he had organized years prior to assuming leadership of the Basie unit in 1986.

Frank Foster suffered a stroke in 2001, that impaired his left side to the extent that he could no longer play the saxophone. After continuing to lead the Loud Minority on limited engagements for much of the 2000s, he turned his leadership responsibilities for the band over to Cecil Bridgewater, a prominent New York City jazz musician. Until his death Foster continued composing and arranging at his home in Chesapeake, Virginia, where he resided with his wife and personal manager of nearly 45 years, Cecilia Foster. He died of kidney failure on July 26, 2011.

== Awards and commissions ==
- Foster received two Grammy Awards: the first, for his big band arrangement of the Diane Schuur composition "Deedles' Blues" (Best Arrangement Accompanying a Vocal, 1987), and the second for his arrangement of guitarist/vocalist George Benson's composition "Basie's Bag" (Best Jazz Instrumental Performance, Big Band, 1990). He also received two Grammy nominations: for his big band arrangement of Charles Trenet's composition "Beyond the Sea", and for an album with his fellow Basie alumnus Frank Wess entitled Frankly Speaking (Concord Jazz, 1985).
- He composed and orchestrated material for The Carnegie Hall Jazz Ensemble, The Detroit Civic Symphony Orchestra, The Ithaca College Jazz Ensemble, The Jazzmobile Corporation of New York City, the Lincoln Center Jazz Orchestra, The Malaysia Symphony Orchestra, The Metropole Orchestra of Hilversum, the Netherlands, and The Thad Jones/Mel Lewis Orchestra. In 1983 Dizzy Gillespie personally commissioned Frank Foster to orchestrate one of the jazz icon's compositions, "Con Alma", for a scheduled performance and recording with The London Philharmonic Orchestra directed by Robert Farnon.
- In 1987, he was awarded an honorary doctorate by Central State University in Wilberforce.
- In 2002, the National Endowment for the Arts presented Foster with its NEA Jazz Masters Award, the highest honor in jazz.
- Foster was commissioned by The Harpers Ferry Historical Association of West Virginia to compose a jazz suite of ten to fifteen minutes' duration in connection with the Niagara Movement, relating to John Brown's famous raid on Harpers Ferry. The suite was performed by the Count Basie Orchestra at Harpers Ferry as part of the three-day Niagara Movement celebration in August 2006.
- Jazz at Lincoln Center commissioned Foster to compose and arrange music for the Lincoln Center Jazz Orchestra, directed by Wynton Marsalis, for performances on March 13–15, 2008, with "A Man and a Woman" as the theme. Foster wrote the words, music, and orchestrations for "I Love You (Based on Your Availability)" and "Romance Without Substance Is a Nuisance", both performed by vocalists Dennis Rowland and Marlena Shaw.
- On March 20, 2009, the Chicago Jazz Ensemble, directed by Jon Faddis, performed a three-part suite by Foster titled "Chi-Town Is My Town and My Town's No Shy Town" at the Harris Theater in Chicago.
- In 2009, Foster selected The Jazz Archive at Duke University to be the home for his numerous compositions, arrangements, and personal papers.

== Humanitarian causes ==
Foster became a great supporter of The Jazz Foundation of America in their mission to save the homes and the lives of America's elderly jazz and blues musicians including musicians who survived Hurricane Katrina. After receiving help from the Jazz Foundation, he supported the cause by performing in their Annual Benefit Concert "A Great Night in Harlem" in 2008.

He donated his gold-plated tenor sax to be auctioned by the Jazz Foundation of America, the proceeds of which went to support the foundation's non-profit programs, especially working gigs and educational programs for victims of hurricane Katrina in New Orleans and the Gulf Coast.

== Discography ==
=== As leader/co-leader ===
- 1953 Here Comes Frank Foster: Frank Foster Quintet with Benny Powell (Blue Note)
- 1956 No 'Count (Savoy)
- 1963 Basie Is Our Boss (Argo)
- 1966 Fearless Frank Foster (Prestige) – rec. 1965
- 1966 Soul Outing! (Prestige)
- 1968 Manhattan Fever (Blue Note)
- 1972 The Loud Minority (Mainstream)
- 1976 Here and Now (Catalyst)
- 1977 Shiny Stockings (Denon)
- 1978 Twelve Shades of Black (Leo)
- 1979 Non-Electric Company (EPM Musique)
- 1982 The House That Love Built (SteepleChase)
- 1983 Two for the Blues with Frank Wess (Pablo)
- 1985 Frankly Speaking with Frank Wess (Concord Jazz) – rec. 1984
- 1985 Generations with Pepper Adams (Muse)
- 1992 The Count Basie Orchestra Directed by Frank Foster Live at El Morocco (Telarc) – live
- 1997 Leo Rising (Arabesque) – rec. 1996
- 1997 Endless Fingers (Arabesque)
- 1998 Swing (Challenge) – live
- 2002 Live at Feuerwache Mannheim (Bassic) – live
- 2003 We Do It Diff'rent (Mapleshade) – live
- 2004 George Gee Swing Orchestra, Settin' the Pace (GJazz)
- 2006 A Fresh Taste of Thad Jones and Frank Foster (Hänssler Classics) – rec. 1995–1996
- 2007 Well Water (Piadrum) – rec. 1977

=== As arranger ===
- 1961 "Little Man (You've Had a Busy Day)" – Sarah Vaughan with the Count Basie Orchestra, Count Basie/Sarah Vaughan (Roulette)
- 1965 Sarah Vaughan, ¡Viva! Vaughan (Mercury)
- 1984 "Mack the Knife" – Frank Sinatra, L.A. Is My Lady (Qwest/Warner Bros.)
- 1984 "After You've Gone" – Frank Sinatra – L.A. Is My Lady (Qwest/Warner Bros.)
- 1985 "Beyond the Sea" – George Benson, 20/20 (Warner Bros.)
- 1987 Diane Schuur and the Count Basie Orchestra, Diane Schuur & the Count Basie Orchestra (GRP)
- 1990 George Benson featuring the Count Basie Orchestra, Big Boss Band (Warner Bros.)

=== As a member ===
Count Basie Orchestra

- Dance Session (Clef, 1953)
- Dance Session Album #2 (Clef, 1954)
- Basie (Clef, 1954)
- Count Basie Swings, Joe Williams Sings with Joe Williams (Clef, 1955)
- April in Paris (Verve, 1956)
- The Greatest!! Count Basie Plays, Joe Williams Sings Standards (Verve, 1956) – with Joe Williams
- Metronome All-Stars, Metronome All-Stars 1956 (Clef, 1956)
- Hall of Fame (Verve, 1959) – rec. 1956
- Basie in London (Verve, 1956)
- One O'Clock Jump (Verve, 1957)
- Count Basie at Newport (Verve, 1957)
- The Atomic Mr. Basie (Roulette, 1957) – aka Basie and E=MC^{2}
- Sing Along with Basie with Joe Williams and Lambert, Hendricks & Ross (Roulette, 1958)
- Breakfast Dance and Barbecue (Roulette, 1959)
- Joe Williams, Everyday I Have the Blues (Roulette, 1959)
- Dance Along with Basie (Roulette, 1959)
- Not Now, I'll Tell You When (Roulette, 1960)
- The Count Basie Story (Roulette, 1960)
- Kansas City Suite (Roulette, 1960)
- The Legend (Roulette, 1961)
- Back with Basie (Roulette, 1962)
- On My Way & Shoutin' Again! (Verve, 1962)
- This Time by Basie! (Reprise, 1963)
- More Hits of the 50's and 60's (Verve, 1963)
- The Board of Directors with The Mills Brothers (Dot, 1967)

=== As sideman ===
With George Benson

- Body Talk (CTI, 1973)
- Big Boss Band (Warner Bros., 1990)

With Kenny Burrell

- Kenny Burrell Volume 2 (Blue Note, 1957) – rec. 1956
- Swingin' (Blue Note, 1980) – rec. 1956

With Donald Byrd

- Byrd's Word (Savoy, 1955)
- All Day Long (Prestige, 1957)
- Fancy Free (Blue Note, 1970)
- Electric Byrd (Blue Note, 1970)
- Kofi (Blue Note, 1971)

With Elmo Hope

- Hope Meets Foster (Prestige, 1955)
- Homecoming! (Riverside, 1961)
- Trio and Quintet (Blue Note, 1989) – rec. 1954

With Elvin Jones

- Elvin! (Riverside, 1962) – rec. 1961–1962
- Heavy Sounds with Richard Davis (Impulse!, 1967)
- Coalition (Blue Note, 1970)
- Genesis (Blue Note, 1971)
- Merry-Go-Round (Blue Note, 1971)
- At This Point in Time (Blue Note, 1973)
- New Agenda (Vanguard, 1975)
- The Main Force (Vanguard, 1976)
- Time Capsule (Vanguard, 1977)
- Elvin Jones Music Machine (Mark Levison, 1978)
- Live in Japan 1978: Dear John C. (Trio (Japan), 1978)
- Elvin Jones Jazz Machine Live in Japan Vol. 2 (Trio (Japan), 1978)
- Live at the Village Vanguard Volume One (Landmark, 1984)

With Joe Newman

- The Count's Men (Jazztone, 1955)
- I Feel Like a Newman (Storyville, 1956)
- Good 'n' Groovy (Prestige Swingville, 1961)

With Duke Pearson

- Introducing Duke Pearson's Big Band (Blue Note, 1967)
- Now Hear This (Blue Note, 1968)
- It Could Only Happen with You (Blue Note, 1970)

With Hilton Ruiz

- Excition (SteepleChase, 1977)
- Steppin' Into Beauty (SteepleChase, 1982) – rec. 1977

With Frank Wess

- North, South, East....Wess (Savoy 1956)
- Surprise, Surprise (Chiaroscuro, 1996)

With others

- Pepper Adams,The Adams Effect (Uptown, 1988)
- Lorez Alexandria, Early in the Morning (Argo, 1960)
- Count Basie, Count Basie and the Kansas City 7 (Impulse!, 1962)
- Earl Coleman, Love Songs (Atlantic, 1968)
- Matthew Gee, Jazz by Gee (Riverside, 1956)
- Bennie Green and Gene Ammons, The Swingin'est (VeeJay 1958)
- Coleman Hawkins, The Saxophone Section (World Wide, 1958)
- Eddie Higgins, Eddie Higgins (Vee-Jay, 1961)
- Milt Jackson, Plenty, Plenty Soul (Atlantic, 1957)
- Illinois Jacquet, The Soul Explosion (Prestige, 1969)
- Quincy Jones, Golden Boy (Mercury, 1964)
- Thad Jones, Mad Thad (Period, 1956)
- Ronnie Mathews, Roots, Branches & Dances (Bee Hive, 1978)
- Jimmy McGriff, The Big Band (Solid State, 1966)
- Thelonious Monk, Monk (Prestige, 1954)
- Horace Parlan, Frank-ly Speaking (SteepleChase, 1977)
- Woody Shaw, The Woody Shaw Concert Ensemble at the Berliner Jazztage (Muse, 1976)
- Art Taylor,Taylor's Tenors (New Jazz, 1959)
- Mickey Tucker, Mister Mysterious (Muse, 1978)
- Eddie "Cleanhead" Vinson,Clean Head's Back in Town (Bethlehem, 1957)
- George Wallington, Showcase (Blue Note, 1954)
- Cedar Walton, Mobius (RCA, 1975)
- Julius Watkins, Julius Watkins Sextet (Blue Note, 1954)

== See also ==
- List of jazz arrangers
