= Herb Wong =

American jazz educator, writer and producer (1926–2014)

Herbert H. Wong (March 18, 1926 – April 20, 2014) was an American jazz enthusiast, educator, writer, producer, disc jockey and zoologist.

Herb Wong in 1984

Wong became interested in jazz music as a child and had his first experience broadcasting while serving in the armed forces. He trained as an educator and zoologist and worked in schools throughout his career. Wong promoted jazz in various ways including writing about jazz, teaching jazz history courses, designing jazz education curriculums, arranging jazz concerts in schools and hosting a radio show for over three decades. In the 1980s, Wong produced music for the Palo Alto and Blackhawk records labels. Such was his reputation, Woody Herman and Cal Tjader, amongst others, composed songs dedicated to him.

== Life ==
=== Early life and education ===
Wong was born in Oakland, California, in 1926 and grew up in Stockton. In an interview for the Regional Oral History Office, Wong explained that he was a fourth-generation Californian from a Chinese-American family that included his uncle, architect Worley K. Wong. At age six, Wong began studying classical piano. He was first exposed to jazz music around aged 11 when he and his brother found a delivery of jazz albums, including recordings by Duke Ellington and Woody Herman, in their home that was meant for the previous residents. Wong would often travel to nearby cities to attend jazz concerts.

During World War II, Wong served with the army which included experience as a disc jockey on the Armed Forces Radio Service in Tokyo. After leaving the army, he studied for undergraduate and doctoral degrees in zoology, specialising in ornithology, at UC Berkeley as well as a master's degree in science education at San José State University. In an interview, he said he once postponed a final examination because it clashed with a Woody Herman concert he was planning to attend. Wong was a field ornithologist and lectured at UC Berkeley before going on to be a teacher and faculty at several schools including Washington Elementary School in Berkeley and Palo Alto High School.

=== Career ===
Wong began presenting a jazz show, "Jazz Perspectives", on KJAZ in 1959 and hosted the show for 36 years until 1996. He was a prolific writer of album liner notes and over his career wrote the notes for over 600 albums.

For 25 years, Wong taught jazz history at the Palo Alto Adult School and was the artistic director and co-founder of the Palo Alto Jazz Alliance, a not-for-profit jazz education group. He also created an oral jazz history for the Smithsonian Institution, initiated a jazz curriculum for Berkeley elementary schools and co-authored children's science books. Wong arranged for acts such as Oscar Peterson, Phil Woods, Roland Kirk and Duke Ellington, whom Wong had to pay himself, to perform for students in Berkeley classrooms. Saxophonist Joshua Redman and trumpeter Steven Bernstein credit Wong's educational programs in Berkeley schools with greatly influencing them.

Wong was president and artistic director of Palo Alto Records from early 1981 until 1985. He also founded Blackhawk Records and produced several albums for both labels.

Wong counselled young Asian musicians and encouraged their creativity. He stated he was "an antagonist to stereotypes."

Later in his career, Wong organised a jazz concert series at Stanford Shopping Center and was president of the International Association of Jazz Education. He received the Palo Alto Excellence Award in Jazz Education in 2013.

== Death and legacy ==
Wong died at home in Menlo Park following prolonged cancer-related health problems on April 20, 2014, aged 88. He was survived by his wife Marilyn, two daughters and four grandchildren.

A collection of Wong's liner notes and jazz journalism, titled Jazz on My Mind, was published in 2016. He began working on the book, with assistance from co-author Paul Simeon Fingerote, following his cancer diagnosis.

Seven jazz compositions were written about Wong, including:

- Woody Herman's "Dr. Wong's Bag";
- Cal Tjader's "Daddy Wong Legs";
- Larry Vuckovich's "Herb's Herbs"; and
- Dayna Stephens's "Dr. Wong's Bird Song".

== Works ==
- Jazz on My Mind: Liner Notes, Anecdotes and Conversations from the 1940s to the 2000s, with Paul Simeon Fingerote (2016, McFarland & Co Inc.; ISBN 9780786496402)
