= Gene Perla =

American jazz bassist

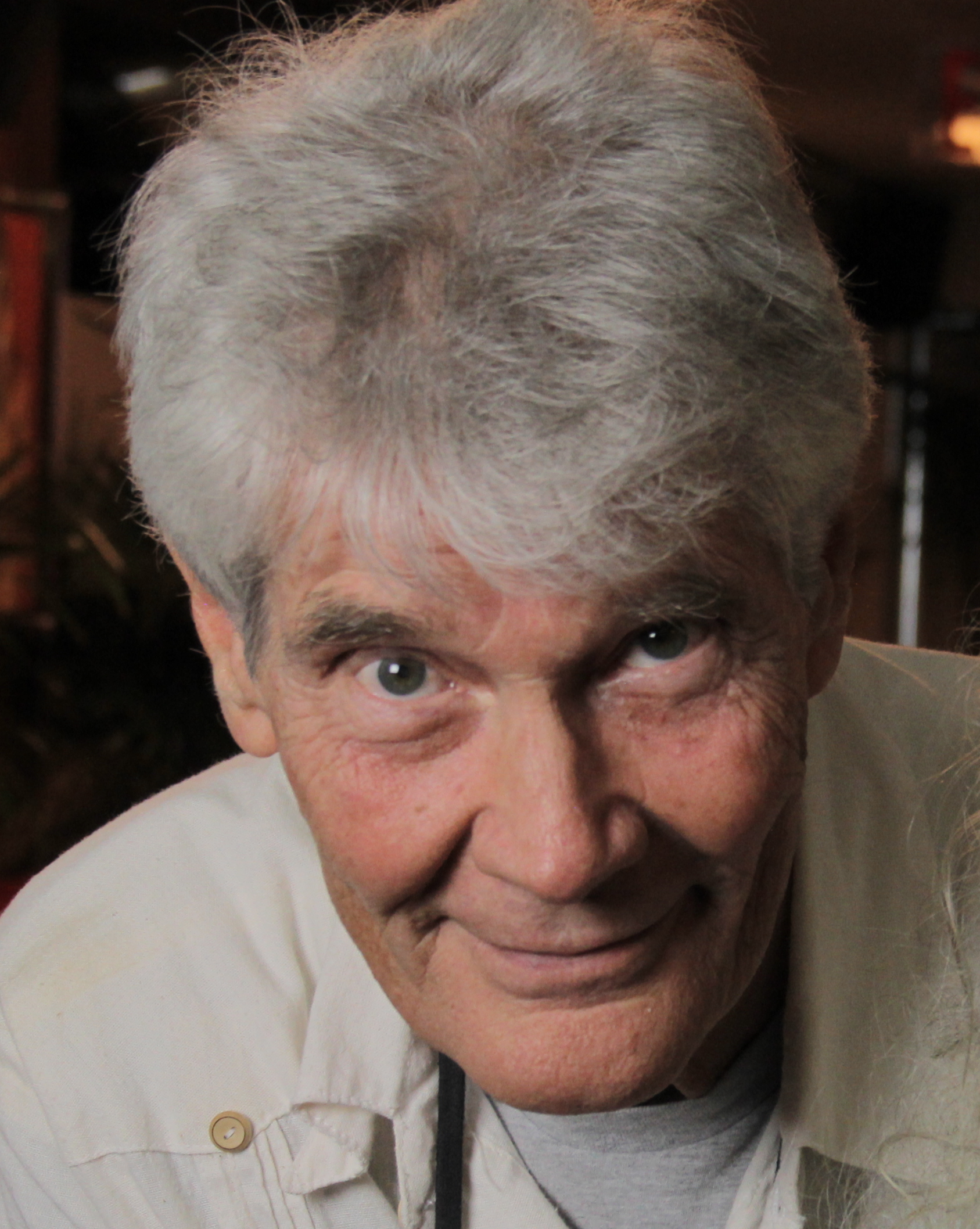
- Gene Perla in 2013

Background information
- Born: March 1, 1940 (age 86); Woodcliff Lake, New Jersey
- Genre: Jazz
- Occupations: Musician, record label owner
- Instrument: Double-bass
- Years active: 1964–present
- Labels: PM, Plug
- Website: perla.org

Gene Perla (born March 1, 1940) is an American jazz bassist.

== Career ==
At the Berklee School of Music and the Boston Conservatory Perla concentrated on piano before moving to double bass. In 1969 he spent two months as a member of the Woody Herman Orchestra. During the early 1970s, he worked with Elvin Jones, Sonny Rollins, Sarah Vaughan, Nina Simone, and The Thad Jones/Mel Lewis Orchestra. In 1975 he started the band Stone Alliance with Don Alias and Steve Grossman. Also in the 1970s he founded PM Records ("PM" for Perla Music), which released albums by Steve Grossman, Elvin Jones, Nina Simone, Pat LaBarbera, and David Liebman. He has taught at Lehigh University and the New School of Jazz & Contemporary Music.

== Discography ==
=== As leader ===
- Stone Alliance ~ Stone Alliance (PM, 1976)
- Stone Alliance ~ Marcio Montarroyos (PM, 1977)
- Stone Alliance ~ Con Amigos (PM, 1977)
- Stone Alliance ~ Heads Up (PM, 1980)
- Stone Alliance ~ Live In Amsterdam (PM, 2004)
- Stone Alliance ~ Live In Bremen (PM, 2005)
- Stone Alliance ~ Live In Buenos Aires (PM, 2006)
- Bill's Waltz (PM, 2008)
- Stone Alliance ~ Live In Berlin (PM, 2010)
- Out of the Gate (PM, 2017)
- Stone Alliance ~ Galvanic Ignition (PM, 2018)
- Stone Alliance ~ In The Pocket (PM, 2022)

=== As sideman ===
With Elvin Jones

- Genesis (Blue Note, 1971)
- Merry-Go-Round (Blue Note, 1971)
- Mr. Jones (Blue Note, 1972)
- Live at the Lighthouse (Blue Note, 1972)
- Hollow Out with Masabumi Kikuchi (Philips, 1972)
- At This Point in Time (Blue Note, 1973)
- Elvin Jones is "On the Mountain" (PM, 1975)
- New Agenda (Vanguard, 1975)
- The Truth: Heard Live at the Blue Note (Half Note, 1999)

With Jeremy Steig

- Energy (Capitol, 1971)
- Fusion (Groove Merchant, 1972)

With Nina Simone

- To Love Somebody (RCA Victor, 1968)
- Here Comes the Sun (RCA Victor, 1971)
- A Very Rare Evening (PM, 1979)

With others

- Miles Davis, The Complete Jack Johnson Sessions (Columbia, 1970)
- Frank Foster, The Loud Minority (Mainstream, 1972)
- Mickey Tucker, Triplicity (Xanadu, 1975)
