= Stan Getz discography =

The recordings of American jazz saxophonist Stan Getz from 1944 to 1991.

== Discography ==
=== As leader/co-leader ===
- 1946–49: Opus de Bop (The Savoy Sessions) (Savoy, 1977)
- 1947: Groovin' High (Modern; Crown, 1956) – live
- 1949–50: Stan Getz Quartets (Prestige, 1955)
- 1949–52: The Brothers with Zoot Sims and Al Cohn (Prestige, 1956)
- 1951: Stan Getz Quintet at Storyville with Jimmy Raney and Al Haig (Roost, 1952)
- 1951: Stan Getz Quintet at Storyville, Vol. 2 with Jimmy Raney and Al Haig (Roost, 1954)
- 1951–52: Stan Getz Quintet at Storyville, Vol. 3 with Jimmy Raney and Horace Silver (Roost, 1954)
- 1951–52: Chamber Music by the Stan Getz Quintet (Roost, 1954)
- 1951–52: Split Kick (Roost, 1954)
- 1951–52: The Sound (Roost, 1956)
- 1951–52: The Greatest (Roost, 1963)
- 1951–52: The Modern World (Roost, 1964)
- 1951–52: The Getz Age (Roost, 1964)
- 1952: Stan Getz Plays (Norgran, 1955) – compiles the 10" LPs Stan Getz Plays (Clef MGC 137) and The Artistry of Stan Getz (Clef MGC 143).
- 1953: Norman Granz' Jam Session #3 (Clef, 1953)
- 1953: Norman Granz' Jam Session #4 (Clef, 1953)
- 1953: Interpretations by the Stan Getz Quintet (Norgran, 1954)
- 1953: Interpretations by the Stan Getz Quintet #2 (Norgran, 1954)
- 1953: Interpretations by the Stan Getz Quintet #3 (Norgran, 1956)
- 1953: More West Coast Jazz With Stan Getz (Norgran, 1956)
- 1953: Diz and Getz with Dizzy Gillespie (Norgran, 1955) – compiles the 10" LPs The Dizzy Gillespie–Stan Getz Sextet (Norgran MGN 2) and More of the Dizzy Gillespie–Stan Getz Sextet (Album 2) (Norgran MGN 18).
- 1953–55: Stan Getz and the Cool Sounds (Verve, 1957)
- 1954: Stan Getz at The Shrine (Norgran, 1955) – live
- 1955: Hamp and Getz with Lionel Hampton (Norgran, 1955)
- 1955: West Coast Jazz (Norgran, 1955)
- 1955: Stan Getz in Stockholm (Verve, 1956)
- 1956: For Musicians Only with Dizzy Gillespie and Sonny Stitt (Verve, 1958)
- 1956: The Steamer (Verve, 1957)
- 1957: The Soft Swing (Verve, 1959)
- 1957: Jazz Giants '58 with Gerry Mulligan, Harry Edison, Louis Bellson and Oscar Peterson (Verve, 1958)
- 1957: Award Winner: Stan Getz (Verve, 1957)
- 1957: Stan Getz and the Oscar Peterson Trio (Verve, 1958)
- 1957: Gerry Mulligan Meets Stan Getz (Verve, 1957) – AKA Getz Meets Mulligan in Hi–Fi
- 1957: Stan Getz and J. J. Johnson at the Opera House (Verve, 1957)
- 1958: Cal Tjader-Stan Getz Sextet (Fantasy, 1958)
- 1958: Stan Meets Chet with Chet Baker (Verve, 1958)
- 1958: Les Tricheurs (Barclay, 1958)
- 1958: Imported from Europe (Verve, 1959)
- 1958: Stan Getz Live in Europe 1958 (Musidisc [France], 1982)
- 1958: Stockholm Sessions '58 (Dragon, 1988)
- 1960: Getz in Poland (Polskie Nagrania Muza, 1991) – live
- 1960: Stan Getz at Large (Verve, 1960) – live
- 1960: Cool Velvet: Stan Getz and Strings (Verve, 1960)
- 1961: Focus with Eddie Sauter (Verve, 1962)
- 1961: Recorded Fall 1961 with Bob Brookmeyer (Verve, 1961)
- 1962: Jazz Samba with Charlie Byrd (Verve, 1962)
- 1962: Big Band Bossa Nova with Gary McFarland (Verve, 1962)
- 1963: Jazz Samba Encore! with Luiz Bonfá (Verve, 1963)
- 1963: Getz/Gilberto with João Gilberto (Verve, 1964)
- 1963: Stan Getz with Guest Artist Laurindo Almeida (Verve, 1966)
- 1963: Reflections (Verve, 1964)
- 1964: Nobody Else But Me with Gary Burton (Verve, 1994)
- 1964: Stan Getz & Bill Evans (Verve, 1973)
- 1964: Getz Au Go Go with Astrud Gilberto (Verve, 1964) – live
- 1964: Stan Getz Meets João & Astrud Gilberto (Giants of Jazz, 1988) – live
- 1964: Getz/Gilberto #2 with João Gilberto (Verve, 1966)
- 1965: The Canadian Concert of Stan Getz with Gary Burton (Can-Am, 1983) – AKA The Vancouver Concert 1965
- 1965: Stan Getz Plays Music from the Soundtrack of Mickey One with Eddie Sauter (MGM, 1965)
- 1966: Two Sides of Stan Getz (Unique Jazz, 1966) – live; AKA Baubles, Bangles and Beads
- 1966: Stan Getz and Arthur Fiedler at Tanglewood (RCA Victor, 1967) – live
- 1966: The Stan Getz Quartet in Paris (Verve [France], 1967) – live
- 1966: Voices (Verve, 1967)
- 1967: Sweet Rain (Verve, 1967)
- 1966–68:What the World Needs Now: Stan Getz Plays Burt Bacharach and Hal David (Verve, 1968)
- 1969: Didn't We (Verve, 1969)
- 1969: Marrakesh Express (MGM, 1970)
- 1971: Dynasty (Verve, 1971) – live
- 1971: Change of Scenes with Kenny Clarke/Francy Boland Big Band (Verve, 1971)
- 1971: Communications '72 (Verve, 1972)
- 1972: Captain Marvel (Columbia, 1975)
- 1972: Stan Getz Quartet at Montreux (Polydor, 1977) – live
- 1974: Jazz Jamboree '74, Vol. 2 (Polskie Nagrania Muza, 1974) – live; split album with McCoy Tyner Quartet
- 1975: My Foolish Heart: Live at the Left Bank (Label M, 2000) – live
- 1975: The Best of Two Worlds with João Gilberto (Columbia, 1976)
- 1975: The Peacocks with Jimmie Rowles (Columbia, 1977)
- 1975: The Master (Columbia, 1982)
- 1977: Live at Montmartre (SteepleChase, 1977) [2CD set] – live
- 1977: Another World (Columbia, 1978)
- 1977: Mort d'un Pourri (Melba, 1977) – soundtrack to Death of a Corrupt Man
- 1978: Academy of Jazz with Bob Brookmeyer (PolJazz, 1978) – live
- 1978: Jazzbühne Berlin '78 (Repertoire, 1991) – live
- 1978: Children of the World (Columbia, 1979)
- 1979: Forest Eyes (CBS [Holland], 1980)
- 1980: Midem Live '80 (RCA [France]; Personal Choice, 1980) – live
- 1980: The Great Jazz Gala '80 (Bellaphon {Germany]; Personal Choice, 1980) – live
- 1981: The Dolphin (Concord Jazz, 1981) – live
- 1981: Spring Is Here (Concord Jazz, 1992) – live
- 1981: Billy Highstreet Samba (EmArcy, 1990)
- 1982: Blue Skies (Concord Jazz, 1995)
- 1982: Pure Getz (Concord Jazz, 1982)
- 1983: Poetry with Albert Dailey (Elektra Musician, 1984)
- 1983: Line for Lyons with Chet Baker (Sonet, 1983) – live
- 1983: The Stockholm Concert (Sonet, 1989) – live
- 1986: Voyage (Black Hawk, 1986)
- 1987: Anniversary! (EmArcy, 1989) – live
- 1987: Serenity (EmArcy, 1991) – live
- 1989: Homage to Charlie Parker (A&M, 1990) – as The Paris All-Stars
- 1989: Apasionado (A&M, 1990)
- 1991: People Time with Kenny Barron (EmArcy, 1992) [2CD set]

=== Posthumous releases ===
- Stan Getz with European Friends (Denon, 1996) – rec. 1959–1971
- The Song Is You (Laserlight, 1996) – live rec. 1969
- Stan Getz Quartet Live in Paris (Dreyfus, 1996) – live rec. 1982
- Yours and Mine (Concord Jazz, 1996) – live rec. 1989 at the Glasgow International Jazz Festival
- But Beautiful with Bill Evans (Milestone, 1996) – live rec. 1974
- West Coast Live with Chet Baker (Pacific Jazz, 1997) – rec. 1953–1954
- Soul Eyes (Concord Jazz, 1997) – live rec. 1989 at the Glasgow International Jazz Festival and Musikhuset Aarhus
- The Stockholm Concerts with Chet Baker (Verve, 1998)[3CD] – live rec. 1983
- Quintessence, Volume 1 with Chet Baker (Concord Jazz, 1998) – rec. 1983
- Quintessence, Volume 2 with Chet Baker (Concord Jazz, 2000) – rec. 1983
- The Final Concert Recording (Eagle Jazz, 2000)[2CD] – live rec. 1990 at the Munich Philharmonic
- Live In London (Harkit, 2002) – live rec. 1964
- Bossas & Ballads – The Lost Sessions (Verve, 2003) – rec. 1989
- Live In London, Volume 2 (Harkit, 2004) – live rec. 1964
- People Time: The Complete Recordings with Kenny Barron (EmArcy, 2009)[7CD] – live rec. 1991
- Stan Getz Quartet Live At Montreux 1972 (Eagle Rock Entertainment, 2013) – live rec. 1972. Also released in Europe (as a CD+DVD), as Stan Getz Quartet Live In Europe 1972.
- Getz/Gilberto '76 with João Gilberto (Resonance, 2016) – live rec. 1976
- Moments in Time (Resonance, 2016) – live rec. 1976 at San Francisco's Keystone Korner
- Getz at the Gate (Verve, 2019) – live rec. 1961 at the Village Gate
- Live at the Berlin Jazztage 1966 with Astrud Gilberto (The Lost Recordings, 2021)[2CD] – live rec. 1966 at The Berlin Jazztage
- Moonrise with Al Haig, Tommy Potter, Roy Haynes, Jimmy Raney, Teddy Kotick and Tiny Kahn (Chameleon Archive, 2023)

=== Live jam sessions with various artists ===
- The JATP All-Stars at the Opera House (Verve, 1957)
- Norman Granz Presents 'Jazz at the Philharmonic' in Europe, Vol. 1 (Verve, 1960)
- Norman Granz Presents 'Jazz at the Philharmonic' in Europe, Vol. 2 (Verve, 1960)
- Norman Granz Presents 'Jazz at the Philharmonic' in Europe, Vol. 4 (Verve, 1960)
- Jazz at the Santa Monica Civic '72 (Pablo, 1972)
- Newport in New York '72: The Jam Sessions, Vol. 1 and 2 (Cobblestone, 1972)
- Montreux Summit, Volume 1 (Columbia, 1977)
- Montreux Summit, Volume 2 (Columbia, 1977)
- Havana Jam with the CBS Jazz All Stars (Columbia, 1979)
- Havana Jam II with the CBS Jazz All Stars (Columbia, 1979)
- All Star Jam Session (Eastworld, 1981) – at Aurex Jazz Festival 1981
- Live Special (Eastworld, 1981) – at Aurex Jazz Festival 1981

=== Compilations ===
- Conception (Prestige, 1956)
- Early Stan with Jimmy Raney and Terry Gibbs (Prestige, 1963) – rec. 1949–1953
- An Introduction to the World of Stan Getz (Verve, 1964)
- The Melodic Stan Getz (Metro, 1965)
- Prezervation with Al Haig (Prestige, 1967) – rec. 1949–1950
- The Best of Stan Getz (Verve, 1967)
- The History of Stan Getz (Verve, 1972)
- Stan Getz: Return Engagement (Verve, 1974)
- The Best of Stan Getz (Columbia, 1980)
- Stan the Man (Verve, 1984) – rec. 1952–1961
- Compact Jazz: Stan Getz (Verve, 1987)
- Compact Jazz: Stan Getz & Friends (Verve, 1988)
- The Lyrical Stan Getz (Columbia, 1988)
- The Girl From Ipanema – The Bossa Nova Years (Verve, 1989)[4CD]
- The Artistry of Stan Getz: The Best of the Verve Years, Volume 1 (Verve, 1991)
- Compact Jazz: Stan Getz With Strings (Verve, 1992)
- The Essential Stan Getz (The Getz Songbook) (Verve, 1992)
- The Artistry of Stan Getz: The Best of the Verve Years, Volume 2 (Verve, 1993)
- Jazz 'Round Midnight: Stan Getz (Verve, 1993)
- Verve Jazz Masters 8: Stan Getz (Verve, 1994)
- Verve Jazz Masters 25: Stan Getz & Dizzy Gillespie (Verve, 1994)
- Verve Jazz Masters 53: Stan Getz – Bossa Nova (Verve, 1996)
- A Life In Jazz: A Musical Biography (Verve, 1996)
- East of the Sun – The West Coast Sessions (Verve, 1996)[3CD]
- The Complete Roost Recordings (Roost/Blue Note/Capitol, 1997)[3CD]
- Jazz 'Round Midnight: Stan Getz – Bossa Nova (Verve, 1998)
- Ultimate Stan Getz (Verve, 1998)
- Quiet Now: Body and Soul (Verve, 2000)
- Stan Getz' Finest Hour (Verve, 2000)
- My Old Flame (Concord Jazz, 2001)[2CD] – reissues of The Dolphin and Spring Is Here
- Café Montmartre (Universal [France], 2002)
- The Very Best of Stan Getz (Verve, 2002)
- Getz For Lovers (Verve, 2002)
- More Getz For Lovers (Verve, 2006)
- Stan Getz: Gold (Verve, 2008)[2CD]
- The Complete Columbia Albums Collection (Columbia, 2011)[8CD]

=== As sideman ===
With Ella Fitzgerald

- Like Someone in Love (Verve, 1957)
- At the Opera House (Verve, 11958) – live rec. 1957

With Woody Herman

- Twelve Shades of Blue (Columbia, 1955) – rec. 1947
- The Thundering Herds (Columbia, 1966) – rec. 1945-1947
- The 40th Anniversary Carnegie Hall Concert (RCA Victor, 1977) – rec. 1976
- Woody and Friends (Concord Jazz, 1981) – rec. 1979
- Live At The Concord Jazz Festival (Concord Jazz, 1982) – live rec. 1981
- Keeper of the Flame (The Complete Capitol Recordings of the Four Brothers Band) (Capitol, 1992) – rec. 1948-1949

With Diane Schuur

- Deedles (GRP, 1984)
- Schuur Thing (GRP, 1985)
- Timeless (GRP, 1986) – live

With others

- Herb Alpert, Midnight Sun (A&M, 1992)
- Chet Baker, Seven Faces of Valentine (Philology, 1990)
- Count Basie and Sarah Vaughan, Echoes of an Era: Basie, Getz and Vaughan Live at Birdland (Roulette, 1975)
- Dee Bell, Let There Be Love (Concord Jazz, 1983)
- Tony Bennett, Jazz (Columbia, 1987)
- Buddy Bregman, Swinging Kicks (Verve, 1956)
- Bob Brookmeyer, Bob Brookmeyer and Friends (Columbia, 1965)
- Herb Ellis, Nothing but the Blues (Verve, 1957)
- Everything but the Girl, The Language of Life (Atlantic, 1990)
- Dizzy Gillespie, Sittin' In (Verve, 1957)
- Benny Goodman, The Benny Goodman Story (Decca, 1955)
- Jimmy Gourley, Good News (Bloomdido, 1981)
- Michele Hendricks, Carryin' On (Muse, 1987)
- Peter Herbolzheimer, Jazz Gala Concert (Atlantic, 1976)
- Kimiko Kasai, This Is My Love (CBS/Sony, 1975)
- Stan Kenton, Stan Kenton Classics (Capitol, 1952)
- Huey Lewis and the News, Small World (Chrysalis, 1988)
- John Lewis, The Modern Jazz Society Presents a Concert of Contemporary Music (Norgran, 1955)
- Abbey Lincoln, You Gotta Pay the Band (Verve, 1991)
- Michael McDonald, Take It to Heart (Reprise, 1990)
- The Manhattan Transfer, Brasil (Atlantic, 1987) – 1 track only
- Barry Manilow, Swing Street (Arista, 1987)
- Helen Merrill, Just Friends (EmArcy, 1989)
- Annie Ross, Gypsy (World Pacific, 1958)
- Cybill Shepherd, Mad About the Boy (Inner City, 1976)
- Johnny Smith, Moonlight in Vermont (Roost, 1956)
