= Arnold Fishkind =

American jazz bassist (1919–1999)

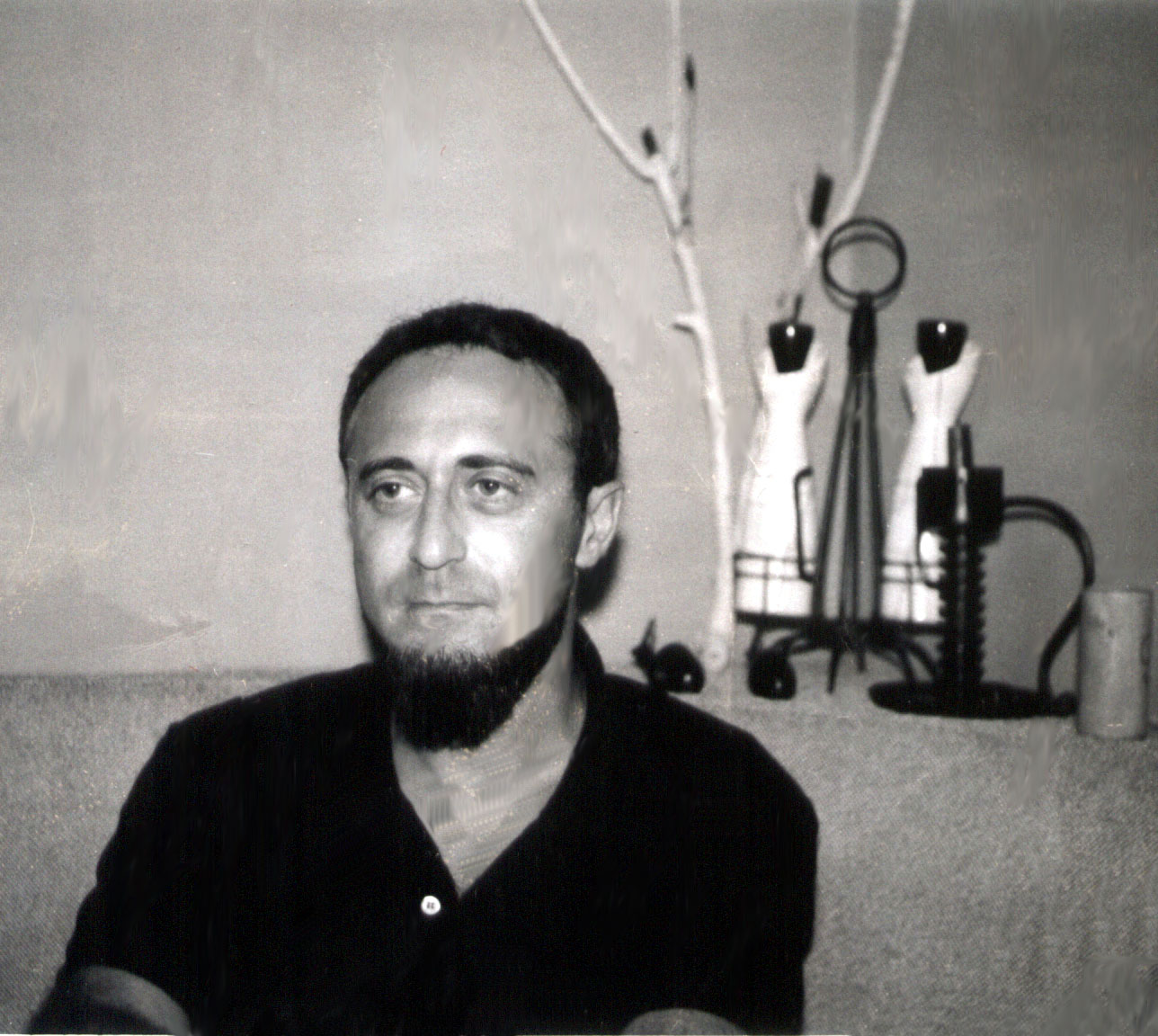
- Arnold Fishkind in the 1960s

Background information
- Birth name: Arnold Aaron Fishkind
- Born: July 20, 1919
- Origin: New York City, New York, US
- Died: September 6, 1999 (aged 80)
- Genres: Jazz
- Occupation: Musician
- Instrument: Upright bass
- Years active: 1937–1988

Arnold Fishkind, sometimes credited as Arnold Fishkin (born July 20, 1919 – September 6, 1999,) was an American jazz bassist who appeared on over 100 albums.

== Early life ==
Fishkind was born in Bayonne, New Jersey, and grew up in Freeport, Long Island, where he met and began a lifelong friendship with Chubby Jackson. At age 7 Fishkind began learning violin, and played in "The Musical Aces", a local band of budding musicians. By age 14 he was playing bass.

== Later life and career ==
Fishkind had his first professional gig with Bunny Berigan in 1937. Following this he played with Jack Teagarden (1940–41), Van Alexander, and Les Brown (1941–42). His career was interrupted at this point by three years of service in the armed forces during World War II.

In mid-1946 Fishkind met and played with pianist Lennie Tristano in New York, but by the fall he left to go to Hollywood to play with Charlie Barnet. During this experience he played alongside Stan Getz. In 1947 Fishkind returned to New York, where from 1947 to 1949 he played with Tristano, and from 1949 to 1951 he recorded with Lee Konitz and on Johnny Smith's Moonlight in Vermont. During this period he also continued to play with Barnet, and played with Benny Goodman.

In the 1950s he found much work as a session musician, for radio (for example, "Across the Board",) television (for example, The Steve Allen Show,) and pop musicians (including Frankie Laine). His career at ABC lasted fifteen years and included appearances in the Andy Williams Show in 1961. Fishkind became well known enough during this time to be mentioned by Jack Kerouac in his novel Visions of Cody.

Rock and Roll having decimated the market for jazz musicians in New York City, Fishkind moved from Glen Cove, New York back to California. In California he found work with the Dean Martin and Bob Hope television shows, and some substitution engagements on the Tonight and Merv Griffin television shows, as well as some recording and film work. He also toured with Les Brown and Lena Horne. Fishkind continued to record into the 1980s, playing with, among others, Frank Scott.

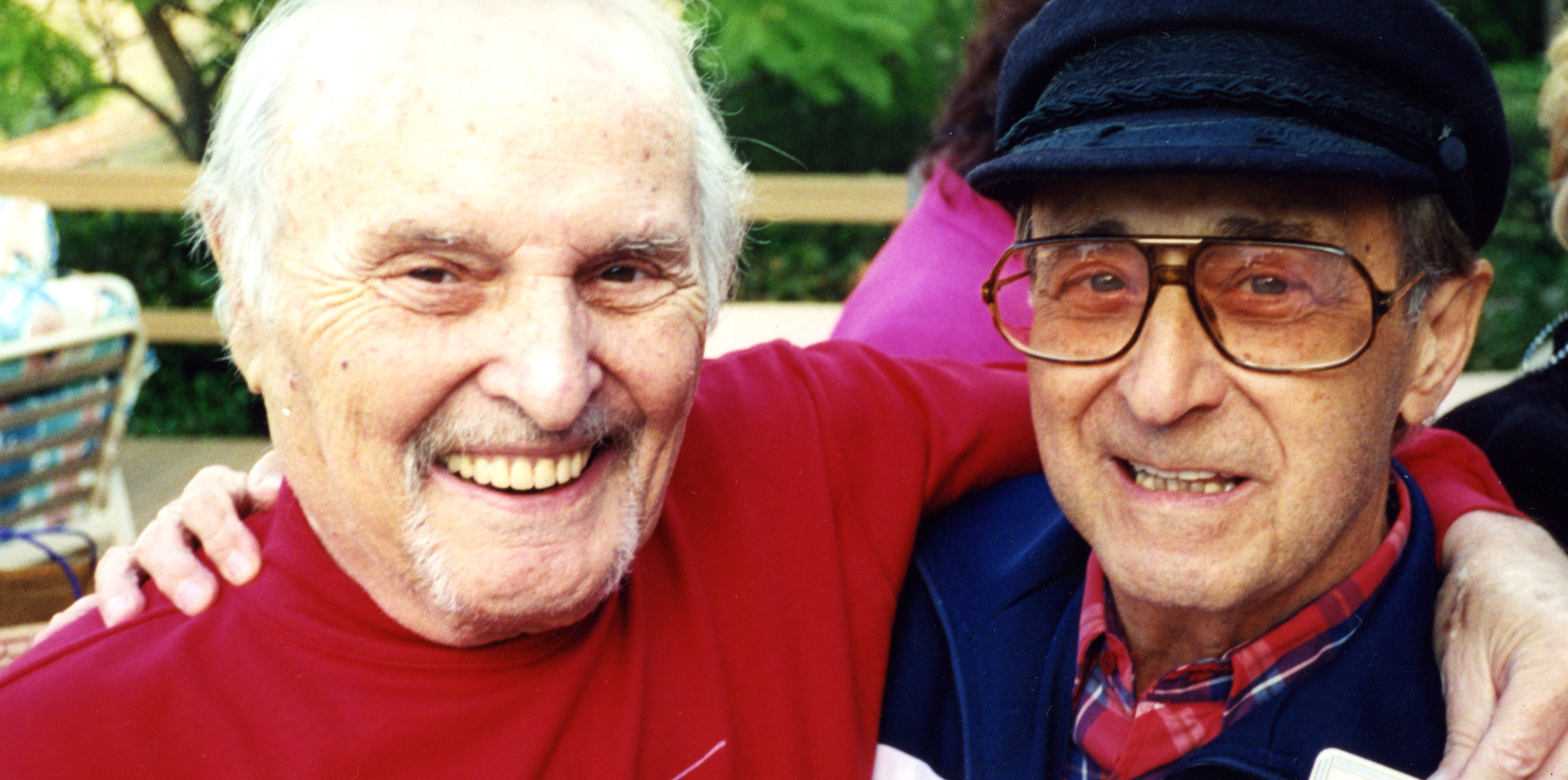
Chubby Jackson and Arnold Fishkind 1998

Fishkind converted to Christianity after discussions with his son, Todd, and contemporary Christian music artist Keith Green. He was at first associated with the Vineyard Christian Fellowship, where he introduced trumpet player/arranger Shorty Rogers and pianist Bobby Corwin, Johnny Mercer's son-in-law, to the group. He later (1978) became an elder at Keith Green's Last Days Ministries. Dearly loved by Green, he was looked up to as a kind of father figure. Ultimately he moved to Palm Desert, California, where he was able to join the celebration of his friend Chubby Jackson's 80th birthday. In his latter years, Fishkind became an ordained minister at Family Life Church in Palm Desert.

During his career Fishkind performed swing and bebop jazz, television, jingles, and even western themed music. His documented associations included, in addition to those mentioned above, Ella Fitzgerald, Stan Hasselgard, Peanuts Hucko, Charlie Parker, Shorty Rogers, Butch Stone, and Jerry Wald. Although there is no mention in the record from whom he learned bass, he gave as his primary influence Jimmy Blanton. Fishkind himself mentored Chubby Jackson and had at least one student, bassist Peter Blannin, who studied with him in New York in 1951. Fishkind died in Palm Desert, California.

== Discography ==
Album	Primary Artist	Release	Label	UPC
Conception	Miles Davis, Various Artists	1951	OJC	25218172622
RCA Victor Presents Eartha Kitt (in the Henri René Orchestra)	Eartha Kitt	1953	RCA	-
That Bad Eartha (EP) (in the Henri René Orchestra)	Eartha Kitt	1954	RCA	-
Down To Eartha (in the Henri René Orchestra)	Eartha Kitt	1955	RCA	-
Subconscious-Lee (rec. 1949–1950)	Lee Konitz	1955	OJC	25218618625
That Bad Eartha (LP) (in the Henri René Orchestra)	Eartha Kitt	1956	RCA	-
Lullabies of Birdland	Ella Fitzgerald	LP: 1956; CD: 2007	Verve	602517247659
Life is Just a Bowl of Cherries	Howard McGhee	1956	Bethlehem	
Moonlight in Vermont	Johnny Smith	LP: 1956; CD: 2004	Blue Note Records	724359309125
Thursday's Child (in the Henri René Orchestra)	Eartha Kitt	1957	RCA	-
Gigi	Hank Jones	1958	Golden Crest	-
Portrait of Bunny Berigan (rec. 1932–1937)	Bunny Berigan	1989	ASV Living Era	743625506020
On the Trail	Frankie Laine	1990	Bear Family	790051154806
Body and Soul (rec. 1939–1956)	Coleman Hawkins	1996	RCA	90266851522
Intuition (rec. 1949–1956)	Lennie Tristano and Warne Marsh	1996	Blue Note Records	724385277122
Complete Savoy and Dial Studio Sessions (rec. 1944–1948)	Charlie Parker	2000	Savoy Jazz	795041707925
Big Band Jazz (rec. 1944)	Jack Teagarden	2006	Collectables	90431087121

With Coleman Hawkins

- The Hawk in Paris (Vik, 1956)

With Lee Konitz

- Inside Hi-Fi (Atlantic, 1956)
