= The Complete Roost Recordings =

Compilation album by Stan Getz
- Released: October 21, 1997
- Recorded: May 17, 1950 – December 16, 1954
- Genre: Jazz, bebop, Latin jazz
- Length: 127:35
- Label: Roost/Capitol; 7243 8 59622 2 6

The Complete Roost Recordings is a 1997 compilation 3-CD set of sessions led by saxophonist and bandleader Stan Getz recorded for the Roost Records label between 1950 and 1954. The compilation includes material previously released on Getz's Roost LPs The Sound, The Getz Age, the two volumes of Stan Getz at Storyville and the album with guitarist Johnny Smith - Moonlight in Vermont along with alternate takes and previously unreleased performances.

== Reception ==
Professional ratings
Review scores
Source	Rating
Allmusic	4.5/5 stars
Penguin Guide to Jazz	👑
Tom Hull	A−

Writing for Allmusic, Leo Stanley stated: "Roost was the first label Getz recorded for as a leader, and what's surprising about these sessions is how mature he sounds here. He had already arrived at his full, rich tone and was able to improvise with skill and grace. That's what makes this box set so rewarding -- it's not only historically important, but it offers a wealth of excellent music". The Penguin Guide to Jazz awarded the compilation a "Crown" signifying a recording that the authors "feel a special admiration or affection for".

== Track listing ==
All compositions by Stan Getz, except where indicated.

Disc one

1. "On the Alamo" [Alternate Take] (Isham Jones, Gus Kahn) - 2:43
2. "On the Alamo" (Jones, Kahn) - 2:44
3. "Gone with the Wind" (Allie Wrubel, Herb Magidson) - 2:54
4. "Yesterdays" (Jerome Kern, Otto Harbach) - 2:46
5. "Sweetie Pie" - 2:28
6. "You Go to My Head" (J. Fred Coots, Haven Gillespie) - 3:00
7. "Hershey Bar" (Getz, Johnny Mandel) - 2:34
8. "Tootsie Roll" - 2:07
9. "Strike up the Band" (George Gershwin, Ira Gershwin) - 2:27
10. "Imagination" [Alternate Take] (Jimmy Van Heusen, Johnny Burke) - 2:31
11. "Imagination" (Van Heusen, Burke) - 2:21
12. "For Stompers Only" - 2:46
13. "Navy Blue" - 2:42
14. "Out of Nowhere" (Johnny Green, Edward Heyman) - 2:26
15. "'S Wonderful" (George Gershwin, Ira Gershwin) - 2:35
16. "Penny" (Horace Silver) - 2:49
17. "Split Kick" [Alternate Take] (Silver) - 2:52
18. "Split Kick" (Silver) - 2:52
19. "It Might as Well Be Spring" [Alternate Take] (Richard Rodgers, Oscar Hammerstein II) - 2:42
20. "It Might as Well Be Spring" (Rodgers, Hammerstein) - 2:52
21. "The Best Thing for You" (Irving Berlin) - 2:41
22. "Signal" [Alternate Take] (Jimmy Raney) - 5:35
23. "Budo" [Alternate Take] (Miles Davis, Bud Powell) - 4:39

Note

- Recorded in New York City on May 17, 1950 (tracks 1–7), December 10, 1950 (tracks 8–15) and January 23, 1951 (tracks 16–21) and at the Storyville in Boston, Massachusetts on October 28, 1951 (tracks 22 & 23)

Disc two

1. "Thou Swell" (Rodgers, Lorenz Hart) - 4:24
2. "The Song Is You" (Kern, Hammerstein) - 7:11
3. "Mosquito Knees" (Gigi Gryce) - 5:21
4. "Pennies from Heaven" (Arthur Johnston, Johnny Burke) - 5:07
5. "Move" (Denzil Best) - 6:02
6. "Parker 51" (Raney) - 6:06 Amazon
7. "Hershey Bar" [Live Version] (Getz, Mandel) - 3:33
8. "Rubberneck" (Frank Rosolino) - 4:25
9. "Signal" (Raney) - 5:51
10. "Everything Happens to Me" (Matt Dennis, Tom Adair) - 3:21
11. "Jumpin' with Symphony Sid" (Lester Young) - 7:25
12. "Yesterdays" [Live Version] (Kern, Harbach) - 2:58
13. "Budo" (Davis, Powell) - 5:11
14. "Wildwood" [Live Version] (Gryce) - 4:57

Note

- Recorded at the Storyville in Boston, Massachusetts on October 28, 1951

Disc Three:

1. "Melody Express" (Gryce) - 2:45
2. "Yvette" (Gryce) - 2:54
3. "Potter's Luck" (Silver) - 2:38
4. "The Song Is You" (Kern, Hammerstein) - 2:48
5. "Wildwood" (Gryce) - 3:03
6. "Lullaby of Birdland" (George Shearing, George David Weiss) - 2:23
7. "Autumn Leaves" (Joseph Kosma, Jacques Prévert, Johnny Mercer) - 2:58
8. "Autumn Leaves" [Alternate Take] (Kosma, Prévert, Mercer) - 3:04
9. "Fools Rush In" (Rube Bloom, Mercer) - 2:24
10. "Fools Rush In" [Alternate Take] (Bloom, Mercer) - 2:20
11. "These Foolish Things" Jack Strachey, Holt Marvell, Harry Link) - 3:01
12. "Where or When" (Rodgers, Hart) - 2:24
13. "Tabú" (Margarita Lecuona, Bob Russell, Al Stillman) - 2:40
14. "Moonlight in Vermont" (Karl Suessdorf, John Blackburn) - 3:12
15. "Jaguar" (Johnny Smith) - 2:31
16. "Sometimes I'm Happy" (Vincent Youmans, Irving Caesar) - 2:18
17. "Stars Fell on Alabama" (Frank Perkins, Mitchell Parish) - 3:03
18. "Nice Work If You Can Get It" (George Gershwin, Ira Gershwin) - 2:24
19. "Tenderly" (Walter Gross, Jack Lawrence) - 3:24
20. "Little Pony" (Neal Hefti) - 2:20
21. "Easy Living" (Ralph Rainger, Leo Robin) - 4:13
22. "Nails" (Buster Harding) - 4:00

Note

- Recorded in New York City on August 15, 1951 (tracks 1–5), March 11, 1952 (tracks 12–15), November 9, 1952 (tracks 16–19), December 19, 1952 (tracks 6–11) and at Birdland, New York City on December 16, 1954 (tracks 20–22)

== Personnel ==
- Stan Getz - tenor saxophone
- Sanford Gold (Disc Three: tracks 12–19), Al Haig (Disc One: tracks 1–7, 22 & 23, and Disc Two), Duke Jordan (Disc Three: tracks 6–11), Horace Silver (Disc One: tracks 8–21, Disc Three: tracks 1–5) - piano
- Jimmy Raney (Disc One: tracks 22 & 23, Disc Two, and Disc Three: tracks 1–11), Johnny Smith (Disc Three: tracks 12–19) - guitar
- Joe Calloway (Disc One: tracks 8–21), Bob Carter (Disc Three: tracks 16–19), Bill Crow (Disc Three: tracks 6–11), Leonard Gaskin (Disc Three: tracks 1–5), Teddy Kotick (Disc One: tracks 22 & 23 and Disc Two), Tommy Potter (Disc One: tracks 1–7), Eddie Safranski (Disc Three: tracks 12–15) - bass
- Walter Bolden (Disc One: tracks 8–21), Morey Feld (Disc Three: tracks 16–19), Roy Haynes (Disc One: tracks 1–7, Disc Three: tracks 1–5), Frank Isola (Disc Three: tracks 6–11), Tiny Kahn (Disc One: tracks 22 & 23 and Disc Two), Don Lamond (Disc Three: tracks 12–15) - drums
- Count Basie Orchestra (Disc Three: tracks 20–22)
  - Count Basie - piano
  - Wendell Culley, Reunald Jones, Thad Jones, Joe Newman - trumpet
  - Henry Coker, Bill Hughes, Benny Powell - trombone
  - Marshall Royal - alto saxophone, clarinet
  - Frank Foster, Ernie Wilkins - tenor saxophone
  - Charlie Fowlkes - baritone saxophone
  - Freddie Green - guitar
  - Eddie Jones - bass
  - Gus Johnson - drums
