= Didn't We =

Didn't We may refer to:

- "Didn't We" (Richard Harris song), a 1968 song by Richard Harris
- "Didn't We" (Lee Greenwood song), a 1986 song by Lee Greenwood
- Didn't We (album), a 1970 album by Stan Getz
