= Apasionado =

Apasionado may refer to:

- Apasionados (English: Passionate People) 2002 Argentine romantic comedy film
- Apasionado, album by Oscar Lopez
- Apasionado, an album by Stan Getz that was released in 1990 by A&M Records, consisting of an orchestrated latin jazz suite composed by Eddie Del Barrio, Stan Getz, and Herb Alpert.

== See also ==
- Apasionada disambiguation
