= Cherokee (Ray Noble song) =

1938 jazz standard

Song
- Published: 1938
- Genre: Jazz
- Songwriter: Ray Noble

"Cherokee" (also known as "Cherokee (Indian Love Song)") is a jazz standard written by the British composer and bandleader Ray Noble, published in 1938. It is the first of five movements in Noble's Indian Suite ("Cherokee", "Comanche War Dance", "Iroquois", "Seminole", and "Sioux Sue"). Due to the tune incorporating many of the chords most commonly used in jazz and the multiple key transitions of the B-section, the tune is often recommended by tutors as a core standard to learn early on in a jazz pupil's development. Notably, Charlie Parker learned the tune in his early days in all 12 keys as a training exercise.

== Structure ==
The composition has a 64-bar AABA form. The A-section harmony is straightforward by the standards of 1930s songs, but the B-section is more sophisticated. This is because "it cadences (via ii7–V7–I progressions) into the keys of B Major, A Major, and G Major before moving toward the B♭ tonic."

== Recordings ==
"Cherokee" has been recorded over the years by many jazz musicians and singers. Charlie Barnet and His Orchestra's 1939 version reached No. 15 on the pop charts; he later re-recorded it in Hi Fi stereo for Everest Records in 1958. It was later recorded by Charlie Parker (1945), the Count Basie Orchestra (1939), Duke Ellington (1951), Art Tatum (1954), Sarah Vaughan (1955), Dakota Staton (1958), and Keely Smith. The song has also been covered as an instrumental by Biréli Lagrène, Bud Powell (1950), Clifford Brown, Don Byas, Stan Getz, Lionel Hampton, Joe Harriott, Ahmad Jamal, Harry James, Wynton Marsalis, Christian McBride, Chet Atkins, Kamasi Washington (on his 2015 album The Epic), and by Johnny Smith (on his album Moonlight in Vermont).

The difficulty of improvising on the harmony of the B-section discouraged many early soloists from doing so.

== Influence ==
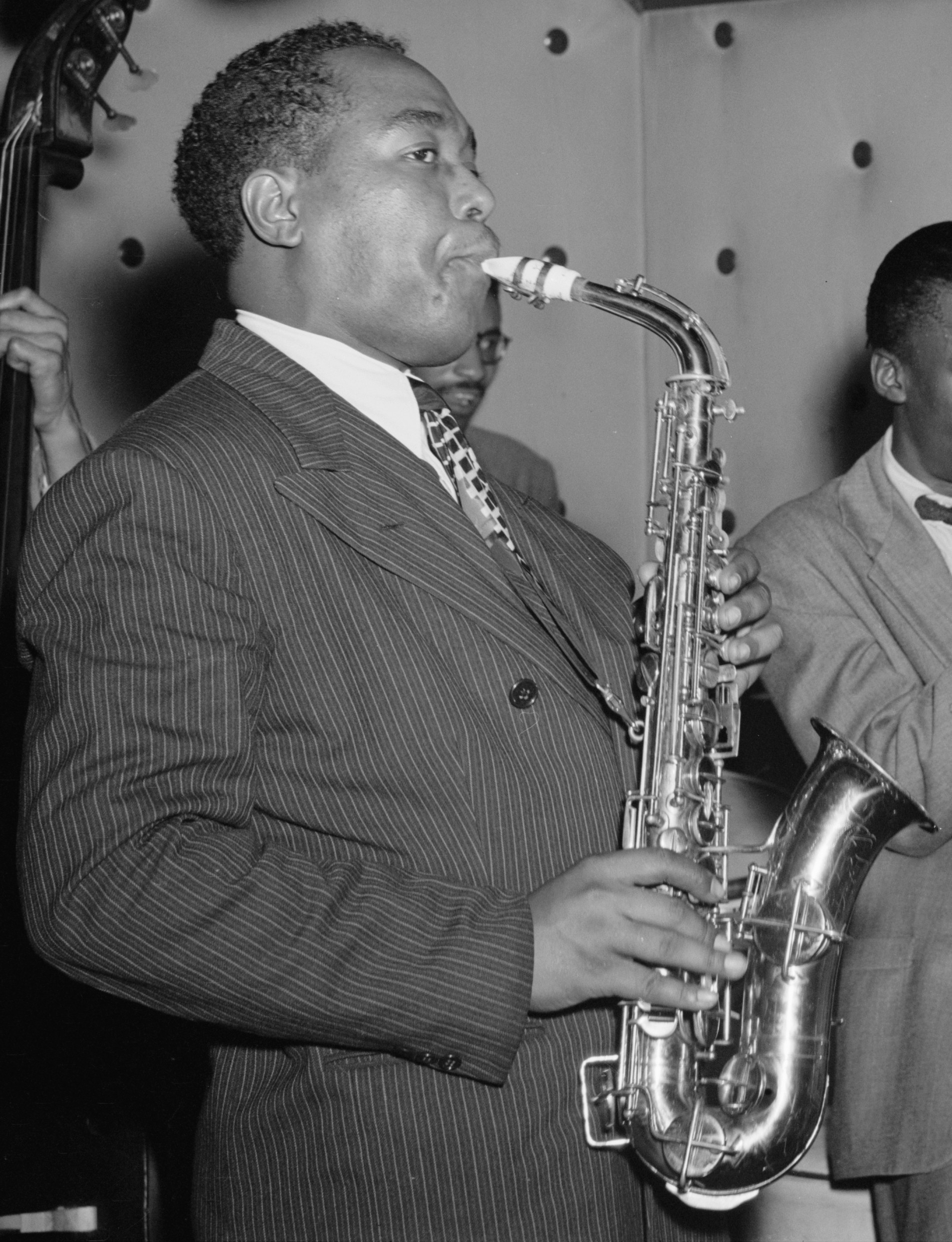
Practicing "Cherokee", Charlie Parker realized that the 12 semitones of the chromatic scale can lead melodically to any key, breaking some of the confines of simpler jazz soloing.

Due to the tune incorporating many of the chords most commonly used in jazz and the multiple key 2-5-1 transitions of the B-section, the tune is often recommended by tutors as a core standard to learn early on in a jazz pupil's development. Charlie Parker famously learned the tune in all 12 keys during his early development to learn how to play, though embarrassed himself when starting in jazz because he had spent so much time on practicing "Cherokee", that his playing was inept when trying to solo over other tunes. While playing "Cherokee", he said that "I found that by using the higher intervals of a chord as a melody line and backing them with appropriately related changes, I could play the thing I'd been hearing." Parker used this song for the basis of his 1945 composition "Ko-Ko", which has a partially improvised head and the chords based on the changes of "Cherokee".

"Cherokee" also formed the basis of Buddy DeFranco's "Swinging the Indian".

A vocalese version, based on the same chord sequence but with a different tune and lyrics, was written by Richie Cole and David Lahm in 1983 and is called "Harold's House of Jazz".

== In films ==
The song was used in the films Jam Session (1944); Jasper in a Jam (1946), sung by Peggy Lee; The Gene Krupa Story (1959); and as background music in Racing with the Moon (1984) and Lush Life (1993), a TV movie starring Jeff Goldblum and Kathy Baker. It was the tune the prisoners played in an attempt to start an avalanche and stop a German Panzer unit in the penultimate episode of Hogan's Heroes.

== See also ==
- List of 1930s jazz standards
