= Appassionata (disambiguation) =

Appassionata is the colloquial name of Piano Sonata No. 23 by Beethoven.

Appassionata may also refer to:

- Appassionata (1944 film), a 1944 Swedish film
- Appassionata (1974 film), a 1974 Italian erotic drama film
- Appassionata (album), an album by Ramsey Lewis, 1999
- Appassionata (novel), a 1996 novel by Jilly Cooper
- Appassionata, an album by Maksim Mrvica, 2010

== See also ==
- Apasionada
