= Inside Hi-Fi =

Studio album by Lee Konitz
- Released: 1956
- Recorded: September 26 and October 16, 1956
- Studio: Van Gelder Studio, Hackensack, NJ
- Genre: Jazz
- Length: 36:19
- Label: Atlantic; LP 1258
- Producer: Nesuhi Ertegun

Lee Konitz chronology
Lee Konitz with Warne Marsh (1955)	Inside Hi-Fi (1956)	Worth While (1956)

Inside Hi-Fi is an album by American jazz saxophonist Lee Konitz which was released on the Atlantic label in 1956. The album includes Konitz's first recorded performance on tenor saxophone.

== Critical reception ==
Professional ratings
Review scores
Source	Rating
Allmusic	4/5 stars
The Penguin Guide to Jazz Recordings	3/4 stars

Scott Yanow of Allmusic states "all eight performances are well played and swinging".

== Track listing ==
1. "Kary's Trance" (Lee Konitz) – 6:09
2. "Everything Happens to Me" (Matt Dennis, Tom Adair) – 4:31
3. "Sweet and Lovely" (Gus Arnheim, Jules LeMare, Harry Tobias) – 4:03
4. "Cork 'n' Bib" (Konitz) – 5:30
5. "All of Me" (Gerald Marks, Seymour Simons) – 5:11
6. "Star Eyes" (Gene de Paul, Don Raye) – 5:22
7. "Nesuhi's Instant" (Peter Ind) – 5:09
8. "Indiana" (James F. Hanley, Ballard MacDonald) – 5:18

== Personnel ==
- Lee Konitz – alto saxophone, tenor saxophone
- Billy Bauer – guitar (tracks 1–4)
- Sal Mosca – piano (tracks 5–8)
- Peter Ind – bass (tracks 5–8)
- Arnold Fishkin – bass (tracks 1–4)
- Dick Scott (Tox Drohar) – drums
