= Peace (Chet Baker album) =

Studio album by Chet Baker
- Released: 1982
- Recorded: February 2, 1982
- Studio: Vanguard Studios, NYC
- Genre: Jazz
- Length: 46:06 CD release with bonus track
- Label: Enja; 4016
- Producer: Matthias Winkelmann

Chet Baker chronology
Chet Baker in Paris (1981)	Peace (1982)	Studio Trieste (1982)

Peace is an album by trumpeter Chet Baker which was recorded in 1982 and released on the German Enja label.

== Reception ==
Professional ratings
Review scores
Source	Rating
Allmusic	3.5/5 stars

The Allmusic review by Scott Yanow states "This one is a bit unusual since the trumpeter is accompanied by David Friedman (on vibes and marimba), bassist Buster Williams and drummer Joe Chambers. The music is somewhat challenging and it inspires Baker to come up with some lyrical statements. There are many Chet Baker recordings from his final decade and his true fans will want to pick up this one".

== Track listing ==
All compositions by David Friedman except where noted.

1. "3 + 1 = 5" – 7:37
2. " Peace" (Horace Silver) – 4:10
3. "Lament for Thelonious" – 10:12
4. "The Song Is You" (Jerome Kern, Oscar Hammerstein II) – 7:08
5. "Shadows" – 4:37
6. "For Now" – 7:30
7. "3 + 1 = 5" [alternate take] – 6:54 Bonus track on CD release

== Personnel ==
- Chet Baker – trumpet
- David Friedman – vibraphone, marimba
- Buster Williams – bass
- Joe Chambers – drums
