= Johnny Smith (album) =

Studio album by Johnny Smith
- Released: 1967
- Recorded: March 28–31, 1967 at Capitol Studios, New York City
- Genre: Cool jazz
- Length: 35:58
- Label: Verve Records
- Producer: Teddy Reig

Johnny Smith chronology
Reminiscing (1965)	Johnny Smith (1967)	Johnny Smith's Kaleidoscope (1968)

Professional ratings
Review scores
Source	Rating
AllMusic	4/5 stars

Johnny Smith is an album by Jazz guitarist Johnny Smith, which was released in 1967 through Verve Records. A compact disc, with extra material, was released in 1997.

== Track listing ==
No.	Title	Writer(s)	Length
1.	"Memories of You"	Eubie Blake, Andy Razaf	2:53
2.	"Manha de Carnaval"	Luiz Bonfá, Antônio Maria	4:38
3.	"Here's that Rainy Day"	Johnny Burke, James Van Hussen	2:32
4.	"Yesterday"	John Lennon, Paul McCartney	2:22
5.	"Spring Can Really Hang You Up The Most"	Fran Landesman, Tommy Wolf	5:10
6.	"The Shadow of Your Smile"	Johnny Mandal, Paul Francis Webster	2:24
7.	"Michelle"	John Lennon, Paul McCartney	3:58
8.	"My Favorite Things"	Oscar Hammerstein II, Richard Rodgers	2:58
9.	"Golden Earrings"	Ray Evans, Jay Livingston, Victor Young	2:59
10.	"On a Clear Day (You Can See Forever)"	Burton Lane, Alan Jay Lerner	2:27
11.	"The Girl from Ipanema"	Norman Gimbel, Antonio Carlos Jobim, Vinícius de Moraes	4:03

1997 CD bonus tracks
No.	Title	Writer(s)	Length
12.	"Shenandoah Breakdown"	Traditional	0:34
13.	"Shenandoah"	Johnny Smith, Traditional	1:41
14.	"Land of the Velvet Hills"	Johnny Smith	2:59
15.	"Land of the Velvet Hills" (Instrumental)	Johnny Smith	2:59
Total length:			44:34

== Personnel ==
- Johnny Smith – guitar
- George Duvivier – bass
- Hank Jones – piano
- Don Lamond – drums
- Stanley Dance – liner notes
- Bob Arnold – Engineering
- Teddy Reig – Production
