= Tenderly =

1946 jazz standard

Single by Sarah Vaughan

from the album Tenderly
- B-side: "Don't Blame Me"
- Published: 1946 by Edwin H. Morris & Co.
- Released: 1947
- Genre: Pop
- Length: 2:32
- Label: Musicraft
- Songwriters: Walter Gross; Jack Lawrence

"Tenderly" is a pop song published in 1946 with music by Walter Gross and lyrics by Jack Lawrence. Written in the key of E♭ as a waltz in 3/4 time, it has since been performed in 4/4 and has become a popular jazz standard. Notable versions have been recorded by singers, such as Sarah Vaughan, Billie Holiday, and Nat King Cole, and pianists, such as Art Tatum, Bill Evans and Peruchín.

"Tenderly" was first recorded by Brazilian singer and pianist Dick Farney on June 15, 1947. Described as "a lovely waltz melody", Farney's version was positively received upon release in July 1947. The second recording was made by Sarah Vaughan on July 2, 1947. Her version entered the charts on November 15 and reached number 27. It has been described as "a ravishing rendition". The next versions were recorded by the orchestras of Randy Brooks and Charlie Spivak later that year. Singer Clark Dennis recorded the song in 1948. Vaughan re-recorded the song for MGM in 1950.

The song has also become a Latin music standard—among the Cuban musicians that have made recordings are Vicentico Valdés, Mongo Santamaría, Bola de Nieve and Peruchín. The Brazilian Trio Surdina recorded a samba-inflected version in 1953, while Jerry González y Los Comandos de la Clave recorded a Latin jazz version in 2010.

== Other versions ==
- Sarah Vaughan – (1947)
- Woody Herman – (1949)
- Rosemary Clooney – (1951)
- Johnny Smith Quintet (featuring Stan Getz) – Jazz at NBC (1953), Moonlight in Vermont (1956)
- Chet Baker – Chet in Paris, Vol. 2: Everything Happens to Me (1955)
- Louis Armstrong with Ella Fitzgerald – Ella and Louis (1956)
- Duke Ellington with Jimmy Hamilton – Indigos (1957)
- Eric Dolphy – Far Cry (1960)
- Oscar Peterson and Joe Pass – Oscar Peterson et Joe Pass à Salle Pleyel (1975)
- George Benson – Tenderly (1989)
- Carmen McRae – Sarah: Dedicated to You (1991)
- Nat King Cole
