= Out of Nowhere (Chet Baker album) =

Live album by Chet Baker
- Released: 1991
- Recorded: December 24, 1982
- Venue: The Nine of Cups, Tulsa, OK
- Genre: Jazz
- Length: 49:41
- Label: Milestone; MCD-9191-2
- Producer: Eric Miller, Kirk Felton

Chet Baker chronology
Studio Trieste (1982)	Out of Nowhere (1991)	Line for Lyons (1983)

Out of Nowhere is a live album by trumpeter Chet Baker which was recorded in Oklahoma on Christmas Eve in 1982 and first released on the Milestone label in 1991.

== Reception ==
Professional ratings
Review scores
Source	Rating
Allmusic	2/5 stars

The Allmusic review by Michael G. Nastos states "Out of Nowhere -- as apropos a title for this CD as could be -- is not well recorded, thin and distant to be kind, unbalanced and unprofessionally reproduced to be accurate ... This is strictly an historical document, for completists only, unfortunately flawed, and far from essential". Although most of blame can be laid on Chet's cornet itself, rather than a thin recording of it, his performance was transcribed and included in The Chet Baker Collection

== Track listing ==
1. "Fine and Dandy" (Kay Swift, Paul Jamesl) – 4:27
2. "There Will Never Be Another You" (Harry Warren, Mack Gordon) – 5:36
3. "Oh, Lady Be Good!" (George Gershwin, Ira Gershwin) – 7:15
4. "Au Privave" (Charlie Parker) – 7:19
5. "All the Things You Are" (Jerome Kern, Oscar Hammerstein II) – 7:12
6. "Out of Nowhere" (Johnny Green, Edward Heyman) – 8:11
7. "There Is No Greater Love" (Isham Jones, Marty Symes) – 4:41
8. "The Theme" (Miles Davis) – 5:15

== Personnel ==
- Chet Baker – trumpet, vocal (track 2)
- Frank Adams – alto saxophone
- Frank Brown – guitar
- Ted Adams – bass (tracks 1, 2 & 6)
- Ron Adams – electric bass (tracks 3–5, 7 & 8)
- Wade Robinson – drums
