= Pure Getz =

Studio album by Stan Getz
- Released: 1982
- Recorded: January 29 and February 5, 1982; Coast Recorders, San Francisco, California and Soundmixers, New York City
- Genre: Jazz
- Length: 47:07
- Label: Concord Jazz; CJ 188
- Producer: Carl Jefferson

Stan Getz chronology
Blue Skies (1982)	Pure Getz (1982)	Stan Getz Quartet Live in Paris (1982)

Pure Getz is an album by tenor saxophonist Stan Getz, recorded in San Francisco and New York City in 1982 and released on the Concord Jazz label.

== Background ==
This was Getz's second album released by the Concord label and the first made in the studio. Following The Dolphin, Getz decided to shake up the lineup of his quartet. First, he replaced bassist Monty Budwig with the 27-year-old Marc Johnson, who had established a strong reputation while performing as the last bassist in the Bill Evans Trio. Then, although Getz had initially been enthusiastic about hiring pianist Lou Levy, he decided to replace him also with a younger and more harmonically advanced player, Jim McNeely, whom Johnson had played with in The Thad Jones/Mel Lewis Orchestra.

The new quartet, with Victor Lewis still on drums, recorded the first part of the album in San Francisco but then had to depart for a gig at Fat Tuesday's in New York City, where Billy Hart claimed the drum chair. The second part of the album was completed in New York under the supervision of Getz's son Steve.

As with The Dolphin, Concord would eventually make additional recordings from these sessions available after Getz's death, on the 1995 album Blue Skies.

== Repertoire ==
The album features two jazz standards and four modern jazz compositions: "Blood Count" by Billy Strayhorn, "Very Early" by Bill Evans, "Sipping at Bell's" by Miles Davis, and "Tempus Fugit" by Bud Powell. McNeely introduced "Blood Count" to Getz, who had not at that point yet heard Johnny Hodges' celebrated 1967 recording of the piece. The take on Pure Getz is the first time Getz had ever played or even heard it. The piece would go on to become central to the saxophonist's repertoire during the last decade of his life, and six later recordings of it by Getz are extant.

The opening piece on the program is an original by McNeely, "On the Up and Up", which the quartet performed during every show of its April 1982 European tour.

== Reception ==
Professional ratings
Review scores
Source	Rating
AllMusic	4/5 stars
The Penguin Guide to Jazz Recordings	4/4 stars

The AllMusic review by Scott Yanow states, "Getz is particularly swinging on 'Tempus Fugit' and quite lyrical on Billy Strayhorn's 'Blood Count'".

Donald Maggin, in his biography of Getz, writes, "McNeely's solos on Pure Getz are not as intriguing as Lou Levy's ... but his harmonies are more astringent, and this seems to inspire Stan to put more bite into his improvisations. ... Stan's joy is palpable as he creates two of the greatest solos of his career on the album's outstanding tracks—Bud Powell's bebop classic, 'Tempus Fugit,' and Billy Strayhorn's deathbed composition, 'Blood Count.'" During the latter, Maggin notes, Getz "alternates marrow-freezing cries with soft, bluesy moans to carry the listener to the poignant center of the piece."

Dave Gelly adds, "Pure Getz is a classic album" and singles out the performances of "Blood Count", "Sippin' at Bell's", and the "exquisite" waltz-time "Very Early" for special praise.

== Track listing ==
1. "On the Up and Up" (Jim McNeely) - 8:10
2. "Blood Count" (Billy Strayhorn) - 3:34
3. "Very Early" (Bill Evans) - 7:05
4. "Sippin' at Bell's" (Miles Davis) - 5:02
5. "I Wish I Knew" (Harry Warren, Mack Gordon) - 7:52
6. "Come Rain or Come Shine" (Harold Arlen, Johnny Mercer) - 8:07
7. "Tempus Fugit" (Bud Powell) - 7:17
- Recorded at Coast Recorders, San Francisco, California, on January 29, 1982 (tracks 1, 2, 4 & 7) and Soundmixers, New York City, on February 5, 1982 (tracks 3, 5 & 6)

== Personnel ==
- Stan Getz - tenor saxophone
- Jim McNeely - piano
- Marc Johnson - bass
- Billy Hart (tracks 3, 5 & 6), Victor Lewis (tracks 1, 2, 4 & 7) - drums
