= Apasionada =

Apasionada may refer to:

- Apasionada (Mexican TV series), Mexican telenovela 1964
- Apasionada (Argentine TV series), Argentine telenovela 1993
- Apasionada (album), an album by Ednita Nazario
- Apasionada, a 1992 album by flautist Jane Rutter

== See also ==
- Apasionado (disambiguation)
- Appassionata (disambiguation)
