= Moonlight in Vermont (album) =

Studio album by Johnny Smith
- Released: September 1956
- Recorded: March 1952 – August 1953
- Genre: Cool jazz
- Label: Roost
- Producer: Teddy Reig

Johnny Smith chronology
A Three Dimension Sound Recording at NBC with the J. S. Quartet (1952)	Moonlight in Vermont (1956)	Johnny Smith Quintet (1953)

Stan Getz chronology
Stan Getz at Storyville (1951)	Moonlight in Vermont (1952)	Stan Getz Plays (1952)

Moonlight in Vermont is a 1956 compilation album by American jazz guitarist Johnny Smith, featuring tenor saxophonist Stan Getz. The material on the album was recorded between 1952 and 1953, and was drawn from two 10-inch LPs, both titled "Jazz at NBC", which were previously issued by the Royal Roost label.

Titled for Smith's breakthrough hit song, its single was DownBeat readers' second favorite jazz record of the year. It was popularly and critically well received and has come to be regarded as an important album in Smith's discography, in the cool jazz genre and in the evolution of jazz guitar. Songs on the album, which reveal the influence of Smith's experiences with the NBC Studio Orchestra, and as a multi-instrument musician, include the title track and the original composition "Jaguar". The title track, singled out for its virtuosity, was a highly influential rendition of a jazz standard that secured Smith's position in the public eye.

Originally released on Roost Records, the album was reissued in significantly expanded form by Roulette Records in 1994, with more material including a previously unreleased version of "Jaguar".

== Reception ==
Professional ratings
Review scores
Source	Rating
Allmusic (CD Reissue)	5/5 stars

Well-received, the album became the #1 Jazz Album for 1956, a position it attained, according to the retrospective book Gibson Electrics, as an "overnight best-seller capturing the essence of the cool jazz era". Critically regarded as one of the defining albums of cool jazz, it is listed in A Concise History of Electric Guitar among those few recordings which "firmly established" the electric guitar's "sound in popular culture, elevating it from the dark dissonance of bebop jazz to the more consonant textures of a rapidly developing style called western swing". Guitar World characterizes it as Smith's "classic album".

== Songs ==
Among the album's songs is the title track, "Moonlight in Vermont", a rendition of a John Blackburn and Karl Suessdorf standard. According to Getz biographer Dave Gelly, the song became an "unexpected hit", an unusual occurrence in jazz music, remaining on the charts for months. It was for this rendition that Smith earned the title "King of Cool Jazz Guitar". "Moonlight in Vermont" was Smith's breakthrough song, launching him into public awareness. It also increased the profile of Getz and resulted in his receiving a contract from renowned jazz producer Norman Granz. Contrary to popular belief, it was the 1952 release of the single, rather than the 1956 release of the compilation album, which was rated the second best jazz record of the year in DownBeat readers' poll.

The song is known for its guitar virtuosity. The New York Times observed that Smith's arpeggio on the song "went from the lowest to the highest reaches of the guitar, all in one fluid movement". Echo and Twang characterized it as "complete with Smith's clear, reverb-tinged sound, his fleet-fingered but relaxed three-octave runs, and above all his lush, close-voiced, chord melody style". Guitar World described it as "a perfect illustration of [Smith's] mastery of the guitar's subtle inner-string voicings".

According to Guitar World, the rendition was influential, becoming "the template for every guitarist to come". Smith's performance of the song was a favorite of guitarist Eddie Cochran and first turned Herbie Hancock on to jazz. James Sallis indicates that "[t]he mood of this ballad has never been more subtly captured".

Also of note on the track list is the song "Jaguar", described by Guitar World as Smith's "signature song". The book Masters of Guitar singles out the "up-tempo Smith original" as among the album's "many gems". Several other tracks were singled out in The Electric Guitar: A History of an American Icon, by A. J. Millard, who theorized that Smith's playing style was influenced by his history as a trumpeter and his experiences in the NBC Studio Orchestra, which required extensive sight reading. According to Millard, in "Moonlight in Vermont" and "Tenderly", Smith's chord melodies resemble piano, while in "Sometimes I'm Happy" and "Tabú" the guitar becomes hornlike at midrange, with the electric guitar resembling a saxophone overall.

== History ==
Originally released on the Roost Records label, catalog RST-2211, the album has been subsequently reissued in an expanded CD form in 1994 on Roulette Records, who had acquired the Roost Collection in 1958. The expanded CD includes all of the tracks from the original album and incorporates most of the artist's recordings from that and the subsequent year, with the exception of three songs. One of the tracks, an alternative take on the Smith-penned "Jaguar", was previously unreleased. The tracks were also included in Getz' Complete Roost Recordings box-set.

== Track listing ==
No.	Title	Writer(s)	Length
1.	"Where or When"	Richard Rodgers, Lorenz Hart	2:24
2.	"Tabú"	Margarita Lecuona, Bob Russell, Al Stillman	2:40
3.	"Moonlight in Vermont"	John Blackburn, Karl Suessdorf	3:12
4.	"Jaguar"	Smith	2:28
5.	"Jaguar" (alternate take)	Smith	2:28
6.	"I Don't Stand a Ghost of a Chance with You"	Bing Crosby, Ned Washington, Victor Young	3:08
7.	"Vilia"	Franz Lehár	2:40
8.	"My Funny Valentine"	Rodgers, Hart	2:37
9.	"Sometimes I'm Happy (Sometimes I'm Blue)"	Irving Caesar, Clifford Grey, Vincent Youmans	2:18
10.	"Stars Fell on Alabama"	Mitchell Parish, Frank Perkins	3:03
11.	"Nice Work If You Can Get It"	George Gershwin, Ira Gershwin	2:24
12.	"Tenderly"	Walter Gross, Jack Lawrence	3:24
13.	"Cavu"	Smith	2:12
14.	"I'll Be Around"	Alec Wilder	2:44
15.	"Yesterdays"	Otto Harbach, Jerome Kern	2:50
16.	"Cherokee"	Ray Noble	2:46
17.	"What's New?"	Johnny Burke, Bob Haggart	3:04
18.	"I'll Remember April"	Gene de Paul, Patricia Johnston, Don Raye	2:46
19.	"Lullaby of Birdland"	George Shearing, George David Weiss	3:03

- Tracks 5, 8, 9, 11, 17, 18 and 19 were added on to the CD reissue.

== Personnel ==
- Johnny Smith – guitar
- Stan Getz – tenor saxophone (#1–4, 9–12 only)
- Zoot Sims – tenor saxophone (#5–8 only)
- Paul Quinichette – tenor saxophone (#13–16 only)
- Sanford Gold – piano
- Bob Carter – double bass
- Arnold Fishkind – bass
- Eddie Safranski – bass
- Morey Feld – drums
- Don Lamond – drums

Production

- Malcolm Addey – mastering
- Michael Cuscuna – reissue producer
- Bob Parent – design, photography
- Teddy Reig – producer
- Patrick Roques – reissue design
- Pete Welding – liner notes
