= Studio Trieste =

Studio album by Chet Baker, Jim Hall, Hubert Laws
- Released: 1982
- Recorded: March and April 1982
- Studio: Van Gelder Studio, Englewood Cliffs, NJ
- Genre: Jazz
- Length: 38:11
- Label: CTI; CTI 9007
- Producer: Creed Taylor

Chet Baker chronology
Peace (1982)	Studio Trieste (1982)	Out of Nowhere (1982)

Jim Hall chronology
Circles (1981)	Studio Trieste (1982)	Live at Village West (1985)

Hubert Laws chronology
How to Beat the High Cost of Living (1980)	Studio Trieste (1982)	Make It Last (1983)

Studio Trieste is an album by trumpeter Chet Baker, guitarist Jim Hall and flautist Hubert Laws which was recorded in 1982 and released on the CTI label.

== Reception ==
Professional ratings
Review scores
Source	Rating
Allmusic	4/5 stars

The Allmusic review by Scott Yanow states: "Baker's CTI recordings (which were usually arranged by Don Sebesky) always came off well. For what would be his final CTI date, he was matched with guitarist Jim Hall, flutist Hubert Laws and a fine rhythm section ... Throughout, Sebesky's charts favorably showcase Baker's lyrical trumpet, making this a recommended LP that deserves to be reissued".

== Track listing ==
1. "Malagueña" (Ernesto Lecuona) – 9:44
2. "Django" (John Lewis) – 10:02
3. "Swan Lake" (Pyotr Ilyich Tchaikovsky) – 8:42
4. "All Blues" (Miles Davis) – 9:43

== Personnel ==
=== Musicians ===
- Chet Baker – trumpet, flugelhorn
- Jim Hall – guitars
- Hubert Laws – flute
- Kenny Barron – keyboards (1, 4)
- Jorge Dalto – keyboards (2, 3)
- Jack Wilkins – guitar solo (4)
- Gary King – electric bass (1, 4)
- George Mraz – acoustic bass (2, 3)
- Steve Gadd – drums
- Sammy Figueroa – percussion
- Don Sebesky – arrangements

=== Production ===
- Creed Taylor – producer
- Rudy Van Gelder – engineer, liner and hall photography
- Blake Taylor – design
- Darryl Pitt – liner photography
- Pete Turner – cover photography
