= Barefoot Dances and Other Visions =

Studio album by Jim McNeely
- Released: January 31, 2018
- Recorded: September 9, 2014 – September 12, 2014
- Venue: Hessischer Rundfunk, Frankfurt, Germany
- Studio: Hörfunkstudio II
- Genre: Jazz
- Length: 62:48
- Label: Planet Arts
- Producer: Olaf Stötzler

Barefoot Dances and Other Visions is an album by Jim McNeely released early in 2018. The album was recorded with the Frankfurt Radio Big Band in 2014. It was nominated for a Grammy Award for Best Large Jazz Ensemble Album in 2019, but it did not win.

== Track listing ==
All titles composed and arranged by Jim McNeely.

No.	Title	Length
1.	"Bob's Here"	9:59
2.	"Black Snow"	10:18
3.	"Barefoot Dances"	6:46
4.	"A Glimmer of Hope"	7:59
5.	"Redman Rides Again"	7:29
6.	"Falling Upwards"	7:52
7.	"The Cosmic Hodge-Podge"	12:25
Total length:		62:48

== Personnel ==
Jim McNeely (as the primary musical artist) conducted the band.

=== Musicians ===
- Martin Auer – flugelhorn, trumpet
- Günter Bollmann – trombone
- Peter Feil – trombone
- Thomas Heidepriem – bass
- Rainer Heute – bass clarinet, alto flute, baritone saxophone
- Paul Höchstädter – drums
- Manfred Honetschläger – bass trombone
- Christian Jaksjø – euphonium, trombone, valve trombone
- Tony Lakatos – alto flute, tenor saxophone
- Oliver Leicht – alto clarinet, alto flute, alto saxophone, soprano saxophone
- Peter Reiter – piano
- Heinz-Dieter Sauerborn – clarinet, alto flute, bass flute, alto saxophone, soprano saxophone
- Martin Scales – guitar
- Axel Schlosser – flugelhorn, trumpet
- Thomas Vogel – flugelhorn, trumpet
- Steffen Weber – clarinet, bass flute, tenor saxophone
- Frank Wellert – flugelhorn, trumpet

=== Production ===
- Olaf Stötzler – producer
- Axel Gutzler – engineer
- Mike Wayszak – engineer
- Terry Lamacchia – cover art
