= The Bill Evans Trio "Live" =

Live album by Bill Evans
- Released: 1971
- Recorded: May 14–19, 1964
- Venue: The Trident Club, Sausalito, California
- Genre: Jazz
- Label: Verve/MGM
- Producer: Creed Taylor

Bill Evans chronology
Stan Getz & Bill Evans (1964)	The Bill Evans Trio "Live" (1971)	Waltz for Debby (1964)

The Bill Evans Trio "Live" is a live album by the American jazz pianist Bill Evans and his trio, with bassist Chuck Israels and drummer Larry Bunker, recorded in 1964 but not released until 1971 (by which time Evans had a different trio with Eddie Gómez and Marty Morell). Evans did not approve the release of this material and blocked a second LP from appearing when jazz critic Leonard Feather called him to discuss the liner notes.

Additional tracks from these live recordings at The Trident were, however, released in 1997 on The Complete Bill Evans on Verve box set. The original LP has been remastered and reissued on CD as a Japanese import (Verve UCCU-6320).

The cover photo is a blue version of the same one that had been used for the album Bill Evans at Town Hall (recorded later but released earlier).

== Reception ==
Professional ratings
Review scores
Source	Rating
AllMusic	4/5 stars

Writing for AllMusic, Matt Collar says, "This is [a] laid-back date that finds Evans delving into a handful of jazz standards including such songs as 'Someday My Prince Will Come,' 'How My Heart Sings,' 'What Kind of Fool Am I?', and others. Although by no means an essential release, ardent Evans fans will definitely want to check this out."

== Track listing ==
Side 1

1. "Nardis" (Miles Davis) - 6:00
2. "Some Day My Prince Will Come" (Frank Churchill, Larry Morey) - 6:20
3. "Stella by Starlight" (Ned Washington, Victor Young) - 6:20
4. "How My Heart Sings" (Earl Zindars) - 4:45

Side 2

1. "'Round Midnight" (Thelonious Monk, Cootie Williams) - 6:06
2. "What Kind of Fool Am I?" (Leslie Bricusse, Anthony Newley) - 8:00
3. "The Boy Next Door" (Ralph Blane, Hugh Martin) - 5:50
4. "How Deep Is the Ocean?" (Irving Berlin) - 5:24

== Personnel ==
- Bill Evans – piano
- Larry Bunker – drums
- Chuck Israels – bass
