= Jim McNeely =

American jazz pianist (1949–2025)

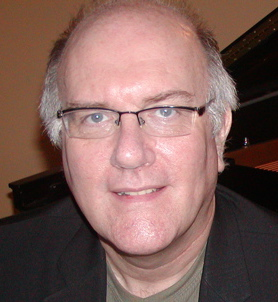

Background information
- Born: May 18, 1949; Chicago, Illinois, U.S.
- Died: September 26, 2025 (aged 76) New York City, U.S.
- Genre: Jazz
- Occupations: Composer; arranger; conductor; musician; faculty
- Instrument: Piano
- Years active: 1975–2025
- Formerly of: HR Big Band; Thad Jones / Mel Lewis Orchestra; Vanguard Jazz Orchestra
- Website: jimmcneely.com

Jim McNeely (May 18, 1949 – September 26, 2025) was an American jazz pianist, composer, arranger and academic.

== Life and career ==
McNeely was born in Chicago, Illinois, on May 18, 1949. He earned a Bachelor of Music degree from the University of Illinois, and moved to New York City in 1975. In 1978, he joined the Thad Jones/Mel Lewis Big Band. He spent six years as a featured soloist with that band and its successor, Mel Lewis and the Jazz Orchestra (now the Vanguard Jazz Orchestra).

In 1981, he began a four-year tenure as pianist/composer with the Stan Getz Quartet. From 1990 until 1995, he was the pianist in the Phil Woods Quintet. In 1996, he re-joined the Vanguard Jazz Orchestra as pianist. He was still associated with the Vanguard Orchestra as composer-in-residence.

From 1998 to 2002, McNeely was chief conductor of the DR Big Band in Copenhagen, Denmark. As of 2011, he was chief conductor of the HR Big Band in Frankfurt, Germany. He was their composer-in-residence. He appeared as guest with many of Europe's leading jazz orchestras such as the Jazz Orchestra of the Concertgebouw (the Netherlands), the WDR Big Band (Cologne, Germany), the Stockholm Jazz Orchestra (Sweden) and the Swiss Jazz Orchestra. McNeely also led his own tentet, his own trio, and appeared as soloist at concerts and festivals worldwide. He recorded more than 20 albums as leader, receiving twelve Grammy Award nominations between 1997 and 2019.

As part of the Vanguard Jazz Orchestra, he received a Grammy Award for the album Monday Night Live at the Village Vanguard in 2008.

McNeely was professor emeritus at Manhattan School of Music, and was former musical director of the BMI Jazz Composers Workshop.

A former resident of Montclair, New Jersey, and Maplewood, New Jersey, he retired to Owls Head, Maine, until he was diagnosed with cancer. He died in New York City on September 26, 2025, at the age of 76.

== Selected discography ==
As leader

- Rain's Dance (SteepleChase, 1976)
- The Plot Thickens (Muse, 1979)
- From the Heart (Owl, 1984)
- Winds of Change (SteepleChase, 1989)
- East Coast Blow Out (Feat. Marc Johnson, John Scofield, Adam Nussbaum & WDR Big Band), (Lipstick, 1989)
- Jigsaw (w/Stockholm Jazz Orch.) (Dragon, 1991)
- Jim McNeely at Maybeck (Concord, 1992)
- Sound Bites (w/Stockholm Jazz Orch.) (Dragon, 1997)
- Lickety Split (w/Vanguard Jazz Orch.) (New World, 1997)
- Nice Work (w/Danish Radio Big Band) (Dacapo, 2000) – rec. 1998
- Group Therapy (Jim McNeely Tentet) (OmniTone, 2001)
- The Power and the Glory: A salute to Louis Armstrong (w/Danish Radio Big Band, feat. Leroy Jones) (Storyville, 2001)
- Play Bill Evans (w/Danish Radio Big Band) (Stunt, 2002)
- In This Moment (w/Adam Nussbaum, Lennart Ginman) (Stunt, 2003)
- Up From the Skies (w/Vanguard Jazz Orch.) (Planet Arts, 2006)
- Dedication Suite (w/Danish Radio Big Band) (Cope, 2006) – rec. 2002
- Paul Klee (w/Swiss Jazz Orch.) (Mons, 2006)
- Boneyard (w/Kelly Sill, Joel Spencer) (Origin, 2006)
- Remember the Sound (w/George Robert Jazztet) (TCB, 2008)
- A Single Sky (w/Dave Douglas & Frankfurt Radio Big Band) (Greenleaf, 2009)
- Quest for Freedom (w/David Liebman, Richie Beirach & Frankfurt Radio Big Band) (Sunnyside, 2010)
- Barefoot Dances and Other Visions (w/Frankfurt Radio Big Band) (Planet Arts, 2018)
- Rituals (Frankfurt Radio Big Band and Chris Potter) (Double Moon, 2022)
- Threnody (Jazz Orchestra of the Concertgebouw) (Challenge, 2022)

With Ted Curson

- Blue Piccolo (Whynot, 1976)
- Jubilant Power (Inner City, 1976)
- I Heard Mingus (Interplay, 1980)
- Snake Johnson (Chiaroscuro, 1981)

With Stan Getz

- Pure Getz (Concord Jazz, 1982)
- Line for Lyons with Chet Baker (Sonet, 1983)
- The Stockholm Concert (Sonet, 1989) –rec. 1983
- Blue Skies (Concord Jazz, 1995) –rec. 1982
- Stan Getz Quartet Live in Paris (Dreyfus, 1996) –rec. 1982

With others

- Mel Lewis, Mellifluous (Gatemouth, 1981)
- Rufus Reid, Seven Minds (Sunnyside, 1984)
- Phil Woods, Flowers for Hodges (Concord Jazz, 1991)
