= Stan Getz & Bill Evans =

Studio album by Stan Getz & Bill Evans
- Released: 1974
- Recorded: May 5–6, 1964
- Studio: Van Gelder, Englewood Cliffs, New Jersey
- Genre: Jazz
- Length: 38:15 (LP); 61:43 (CD reissue)
- Label: Verve; V6-8833
- Producer: Creed Taylor

Bill Evans chronology
Trio 64 (1964)	Stan Getz & Bill Evans (1974)	The Bill Evans Trio "Live" (1964)

Stan Getz chronology
Nobody Else but Me (1964)	Stan Getz & Bill Evans (1964)	Getz Au Go Go (1964)

Alternative cover
- Cover of the 1988 CD reissue

Stan Getz & Bill Evans (subtitled Previously Unreleased Recordings) is an album by jazz saxophonist Stan Getz and pianist Bill Evans, recorded in 1964 for the Verve label, but not released until 1974.

== Reception ==
The AllMusic review by Ken Dryden states: "It is peculiar that Verve shelved the results for over a decade before issuing any of the music, though it may have been felt that Getz and Evans hadn't had enough time to achieve the desired chemistry, though there are memorable moments."

Professional ratings
Review scores
Source	Rating
AllMusic	4/5 stars
The Penguin Guide to Jazz Recordings	3/4 stars

== Track listing ==
1. "Night and Day" (Cole Porter) – 6:45
2. "But Beautiful (Johnny Burke, Jimmy Van Heusen) – 4:41
3. "Funkallero" (Bill Evans) – 6:40
4. "My Heart Stood Still" (Lorenz Hart, Richard Rodgers) – 8:37
5. "Melinda" (Burton Lane, Alan Jay Lerner) – 5:04
6. "Grandfather's Waltz" (Lasse Färnlöf, Gene Lees) – 6:28

Bonus tracks on CD reissue:

7. "Carpetbagger's Theme" (Elmer Bernstein) – 1:47
8. "WNEW (Theme Song)" (Larry Green) – 2:50
9. "My Heart Stood Still" [Alternate Take] – 6:45
10. "Grandfather's Waltz" [Alternate Take] – 5:32
11. "Night and Day" [Alternate Take] – 6:34

== Personnel ==
- Stan Getz – tenor saxophone
- Bill Evans – piano
- Richard Davis – bass (tracks 4–6, 9 & 10)
- Ron Carter – bass (tracks 1–3, 7, 8 & 11)
- Elvin Jones – drums

== Charts ==
=== Weekly charts ===
Weekly chart performance for Stan Getz & Bill Evans
Chart (2024)	Peak position
Croatian International Albums (HDU)	28
