= Marrakesh Express (album) =

Studio album by Stan Getz
- Released: 1970
- Recorded: 1969; Abbey Road, London
- Genre: Jazz
- Label: MGM; E/SE 4696
- Producer: George Martin

Stan Getz chronology
Didn't We (1969)	Marrakesh Express (1970)	Dynasty (1971)

Marrakesh Express is an album by saxophonist Stan Getz and orchestra arranged and conducted by Richard Hewson which was released on the MGM label in 1970.

== Reception ==
Professional ratings
Review scores
Source	Rating
Allmusic	3/5 stars

The Allmusic site awarded the album 3 stars.

== Track listing ==
1. "Marrakesh Express" (Graham Nash) - 3:24
2. "Raindrops Keep Fallin' on My Head" (Burt Bacharach, Hal David) - 3:35
3. "I'll Never Fall in Love Again" (Bacharach, David) - 2:50
4. "Both Sides, Now" (Joni Mitchell) - 3:18
5. "Without Her" (Harry Nilsson) - 3:16
6. "Cecilia" (Paul Simon) - 4:05
7. "Love Theme from Romeo and Juliet" (Nino Rota) - 4:24
8. "Medley: Because/Do You Know The Way to San Jose" (John Lennon, Paul McCartney/Bacharach, David) - 8:03
9. "Just a Child" (Johnny Mandel) - 4:39
10. "The April Fools" (Bacharach, David) - 3:06

== Personnel ==
- Stan Getz - tenor saxophone
- Unidentified orchestra arranged and conducted by Richard Hewson
- Jeff Jarratt - recording engineer
