= The Stan Getz Quartet in Paris =

Live album by The Stan Getz Quartet
- Released: 1967
- Recorded: November 13, 1966
- Venue: Salle Pleyel, Paris, France
- Genre: Jazz
- Length: 38:36
- Label: Verve; 17 078

Stan Getz chronology
Two Sides of Stan Getz (1966)	The Stan Getz Quartet in Paris (1967)	Voices (1966)

The Stan Getz Quartet in Paris is a live album by saxophonist Stan Getz recorded at the Salle Pleyel which was first released on the French Verve label.

== Reception ==
Professional ratings
Review scores
Source	Rating
AllMusic	4/5 stars
The Penguin Guide to Jazz Recordings	3/4 stars

The AllMusic review by Ken Dryden stated "The tenor saxophonist's always-lush tone is beautifully complemented by his musicians' sensitive accompaniment".

== Track listing ==
There are several editions of this album. Here are all the tracks included in at least one of them.

1. "Manhã de Carnaval" (Luiz Bonfá, Antônio Maria) - 3:26
2. "When the World Was Young" (Philippe-Gérard, Angèle Vannier, Johnny Mercer) - 6:09
3. "Singing Song" (Gary Burton) - 3:10
4. "Sweet Rain" (Mike Gibbs) - 7:30
5. "On Green Dolphin Street" (Bronisław Kaper, Ned Washington) - 5:52
6. "O Grande Amor" (Antônio Carlos Jobim, Vinicius de Moraes) - 5:25
7. "Stan's Blues" (Stan Getz, Gigi Gryce) - 5:53
8. "Edelweiss" (Richard Rodgers, Oscar Hammerstein II) - 3:56
9. "The Knight Rides Again" (Frank Loesser) - 10:10

== Personnel ==
- Stan Getz - tenor saxophone
- Gary Burton - vibraphone
- Steve Swallow - bass
- Roy Haynes - drums
