= Stan Getz with Guest Artist Laurindo Almeida =

Stan Getz With Guest Artist Laurindo Almeida

Studio album by Stan Getz With Laurindo Almeida
- Released: November 1966
- Recorded: March 21–22, 1963
- Studio: Webster Hall, New York City
- Genre: Latin jazz
- Length: 32:12
- Label: Verve; V6-8665
- Producer: Creed Taylor

Stan Getz With Laurindo Almeida chronology
Getz/Gilberto (1963)	Stan Getz With Guest Artist Laurindo Almeida (1966)	Reflections (1963)

Stan Getz With Guest Artist Laurindo Almeida is an album by American saxophonist Stan Getz and guitarist Laurindo Almeida, recorded in 1963 and issued on Verve as V/V6-8665.

Professional ratings
Review scores
Source	Rating
AllMusic	4.5/5 stars

== Track listing ==
1. "Menina Moça (Young Lady)" (Luiz Antônio) - 5:45
2. "Once Again (Outra Vez)" (Antônio Carlos Jobim) - 6:45
3. "Winter Moon" (Laurindo Almeida, Portia Nelson) - 5:15
4. "Do What You Do, Do" (Almeida, Jeanne Taylor) - 4:31
5. "Samba Da Sahra" (Almeida) - 4:50
6. "Maracatu-Too" (Almeida, Getz) - 4:57
7. "Corcovado" (Antônio Carlos Jobim) - 5:11 (bonus track - on 1984 CD reissue only)

Tracks 2, 5, 6 recorded on March 21, 1963; tracks 1, 3, 4 on March 22, 1963.

== Personnel ==
- Stan Getz - tenor saxophone
- Laurindo Almeida - guitar
- George Duvivier - bass
- Dave Bailey, or Edison Machado, or Jose Soorez - drums
- Steve Kuhn - piano (tracks 1 & 6)
- José Paulo, Luiz Parga - latin percussion (track 6 only)
