= Body and Soul (Coleman Hawkins album) =

Compilation album by Coleman Hawkins
- Released: 1996
- Recorded: 1939–1956
- Genre: Jazz
- Length: 59:42
- Label: RCA
- Producer: John Snyder (reissue)

Professional ratings
Review scores
Source	Rating
Allmusic	4.5/5 stars
Encyclopedia of Popular Music	5/5 stars
Tom Hull	A−

Body and Soul is an album by the jazz tenor saxophonist Coleman Hawkins, including recordings made between 1939 and 1956. It takes its name from one of Hawkins' most famous performances – a 1939 recording of "Body and Soul". The album also contains a 1956 recording of the same piece. (Because the 1939 recording is held in the highest regard, there have been a number of compilations with the same title, including an earlier CD from Records, on the Topaz Jazz Records/Pearl imprint, and a boxed set from Proper.)

== Track listing ==
1. "Meet Doctor Foo" (Hawkins) – 2:32
2. "Fine Dinner" (Hawkins) – 2:33
3. "She's Funny That Way" (Whiting–Daniels) – 3:14
4. "Body and Soul" (Heyman–Green–Sour) – 3:00
5. "When Day Is Done" (Katscher–deSylva) – 3:15
6. "The Sheik of Araby" (Wheeler–Smith–Snyder) – 2:56
7. "My Blue Heaven" (Whiting–Donaldson) – 2:46
8. "Bouncing with Bean" (Hawkins) – 3:03
9. "Say It Isn't So" (Berlin) – 2:57
10. "Spotlite" (Hawkins) – 3:06
11. "April in Paris" (Harburg–Duke) – 3:06
12. "How Strange" (Prozorovsky–Brent–Kahn–Stothart) – 3:02
13. "Half Step Down, Please" (Dameron–Hawkins) – 3:02
14. "Angel Face" (Jones) – 3:12
15. "There Will Never Be Another You" (Warren–Gordon) – 2:57
16. "The Bean Stalks Again" (Hawkins) – 3:24
17. "Body and Soul" – 4:51
18. "I Love Paris" (Porter) – 3:30
19. "Under Paris Skies" (Gannon–Drejac–Giraud) – 2:45

== Personnel ==
- Coleman Hawkins – Tenor saxophone
- Tommy Lindsay – Trumpet
- Joe Guy – Trumpet
- Early Hardy – Trombone
- Jackie Fields – Alto saxophone
- Eustis Moore – Alto saxophone
- Gene Rodgers – Piano
- William Oscar Smith – Double Bass
- Arthur Herbert – Drums
- Thelma Carpenter – Vocals on "She's Funny That Way"
