= Spring Is Here (album) =

Live album by Stan Getz
- Released: 1992
- Recorded: May 10, 1981; Keystone Korner, San Francisco, California
- Genre: Jazz
- Length: 50:28
- Label: Concord Jazz; CCD 4500
- Producer: Carl Jefferson

Stan Getz chronology
The Dolphin (1981)	Spring Is Here (1992)	Billy Highstreet Samba (1981)

Spring Is Here is a live album by saxophonist Stan Getz, which was recorded at the Keystone Korner in San Francisco in 1981 at the same time as Getz's album The Dolphin but was released on the Concord Jazz label in 1992, shortly after Getz's death.

== Reception ==
Professional ratings
Review scores
Source	Rating
Allmusic	3/5 stars
The Penguin Guide to Jazz Recordings	3.5/4 stars

The AllMusic review by Scott Yanow said that the album features "Getz's tone and strong improvising skills at their best".

== Track listing ==
1. "How About You?" (Burton Lane, Ralph Freed) - 10:08
2. "You're Blasé" (Ord Hamilton, Bruce Sievier) - 5:32
3. "Easy Living" (Ralph Rainger, Leo Robin) - 6:51
4. "Sweet Lorraine" (Cliff Burwell, Mitchell Parish) - 5:34
5. "Old Devil Moon" (Lane, Yip Harburg) - 10:18
6. "I'm Old Fashioned" (Jerome Kern, Johnny Mercer) - 6:41
7. "Spring Is Here" (Richard Rodgers, Lorenz Hart) - 7:46

== Personnel ==
- Stan Getz - tenor saxophone
- Lou Levy - piano
- Monty Budwig - bass
- Victor Lewis - drums
