= Blue Skies (Stan Getz album) =

Studio album by Stan Getz
- Released: 1995
- Recorded: January 1982; San Francisco, California
- Genre: Jazz
- Length: 43:03
- Label: Concord Jazz; CCD 4676
- Producer: Carl Jefferson and Stan Getz

Stan Getz chronology
Billy Highstreet Samba (1981)	Blue Skies (1995)	Pure Getz (1982)

Blue Skies is an album by the saxophonist Stan Getz, recorded in San Francisco in 1982 but not released on the Concord Jazz label until 1995.

== Reception ==
Professional ratings
Review scores
Source	Rating
AllMusic	4/5 stars
Entertainment Weekly	B+
The Penguin Guide to Jazz Recordings	3.5/4 stars

The AllMusic review by Alex Henderson stated: "True to form, Getz makes the listener marvel at his tone throughout the album; without question, he had one of the sexiest, most gorgeous tones in the history of jazz. It's unfortunate that this excellent material went unreleased for 13 years".

== Track listing ==
1. "Spring Is Here" (Richard Rodgers, Lorenz Hart) - 7:08
2. "Antigny" (Marc Johnson) - 7:34
3. "Easy Living" (Ralph Rainger, Leo Robin) - 7:42
4. "There We Go" (Jim McNeely) - 8:24
5. "Blue Skies" (Irving Berlin) - 6:39
6. "How Long Has This Been Going On?" (George Gershwin, Ira Gershwin) - 5:54

== Personnel ==
- Stan Getz - tenor saxophone
- Jim McNeely - piano
- Marc Johnson - bass
- Billy Hart - drums
