= The Song Is You (Stan Getz album) =

Live album by Stan Getz
- Released: 1996
- Recorded: February 12, 1969
- Genre: Jazz
- Length: 51:49
- Label: Laserlight; 17 078

Stan Getz chronology
What the World Needs Now: Stan Getz Plays Burt Bacharach and Hal David (1968)	The Song Is You (1996)	Didn't We (1969)

The Song Is You is a live album by saxophonist Stan Getz which was released on the Laserlight label in 1996.

== Reception ==
Professional ratings
Review scores
Source	Rating
AllMusic	4/5 stars

The AllMusic review by Michael G. Nastos stated "The Song Is You is a missing link between a less than successful teaming with Bill Evans, and the more modern quartet music Getz played thereafter with Corea, Jimmy Rowles, Joanne Brackeen, or Kenny Barron. It's a very worthwhile item to own if you search for it, well recorded and performed by a group that could collectively be the most purely talented of any you might find who ever backed up Stan Getz".

== Track listing ==
1. "The Song Is You" (Jerome Kern, Oscar Hammerstein II) - 5:51
2. "O Grande Amor" (Antônio Carlos Jobim, Vinícius de Moraes) - 6:02
3. "For Jane" (Jack DeJohnette) - 3:22
4. "Dane's Chant" (Stanley Cowell) - 7:36
5. "Major General" (DeJohnette) - 6:32
6. "Folk Tune for Bass" (Miroslav Vitous) - 5:10
7. "Tonight I Shall Sleep/Desafinado" (Duke Ellington, Irving Gordon/Jobim, Newton Mendonça) - 13:08
8. "All the Things You Are" (Kern, Hammerstein) - 6:50
9. "Summer Night" (Jobim) - 3:42
10. "One Note Samba" (Jobim, Mendonça) - 1:58

== Personnel ==
- Stan Getz - tenor saxophone
- Stanley Cowell - piano
- Miroslav Vitous - bass
- Jack DeJohnette - drums
