= What the World Needs Now: Stan Getz Plays Burt Bacharach and Hal David =

Studio album by Stan Getz
- Released: 1968
- Recorded: December 2, 1966, August 30–31, 1967 and February 14, 1968
- Studios: Van Gelder, Englewood Cliffs, New Jersey, Ter-Mar Recording Studio, Chicago, Illinois, and A&R Recording Studio, New York City
- Genre: Jazz
- Length: 46:12
- Labels: Verve; V/V6 8752
- Producer: Esmond Edwards

Stan Getz chronology
Sweet Rain (1967)	What the World Needs Now: Stan Getz Plays Burt Bacharach and Hal David (1968)	The Song Is You (1969)

What the World Needs Now: Stan Getz Plays Burt Bacharach and Hal David is an album by saxophonist Stan Getz, released on the Verve label in 1968.

== Reception ==
Professional ratings
Review scores
Source	Rating
AllMusic	2.5/5 stars
The Penguin Guide to Jazz Recordings	3/4 stars

The AllMusic review by Richard S. Ginell stated that "this isn't one of Getz's better gigs; his tone is not in the best of shape, and he sounds bored with some of the tunes".

== Track listing ==
All compositions by Burt Bacharach and Hal David except where noted.

1. "Wives and Lovers" - 3:36
2. "The Windows of the World" - 2:43
3. "The Look of Love" - 2:39
4. "Any Old Time of Day" - 3:33
5. "Alfie" - 2:51
6. "In Times Like These" - 2:44
7. "A House Is Not a Home" - 4:13
8. "Trains and Boats and Planes" - 3:01
9. "What the World Needs Now Is Love" - 2:58
10. "In Between the Heartaches" [edited master take] - 2:17
11. "Walk on By" - 3:32
12. "A House Is Not a Home" [alternate take] - 4:25 Bonus track on CD reissue
13. "In Between the Heartaches" [partial alternate take] - 2:35 Bonus track on CD reissue
14. "My Own True Love" (Max Steiner, Mack David) - 2:29 Bonus track on CD reissue
15. "Tara's Theme" (Max Steiner) - 2:36 Bonus track on CD reissue
- Recorded at Van Gelder Studio in Englewood Cliffs, New Jersey, on December 2, 1966 (tracks 3, 14 & 15); at Ter-Mar Recording Studio in Chicago, Illinois, on August 30 & 31, 1967 (tracks 1, 2, 4, 6–8, 11 & 12); and at A&R Recording Studio, New York City, on February 14, 1968 (tracks 5, 9, 10 & 13)

== Personnel ==
- Stan Getz - tenor saxophone
- Jim Buffington - French horn (tracks 5, 9, 10 & 13)
- Jerome Richardson - woodwinds (tracks 5, 9, 10 & 13)
- Chick Corea (tracks 1, 2, 4, 6–8, 11 & 12), Herbie Hancock (tracks 3, 5, 9, 10 & 13–15) - piano
- Kenny Burrell (tracks 5, 9, 10 & 13), Jim Hall (tracks: 3, 14 & 15), Phil Upchurch (tracks 1, 2, 4, 6–8, 11 & 12) - guitar
- Gloria Agostini - harp (tracks 5, 9, 10 & 13)
- Walter Booker (tracks 1, 2, 4, 6–8, 11 & 12), Ron Carter (tracks 3, 5, 9, 10 & 13–15) - bass
- David Carey - vibraphone (tracks 5, 9, 10 & 13)
- Bill Horwath - cimbalom (tracks 3, 14 & 15)
- Roy Haynes (tracks 1, 2, 4, 6–8, 11 & 12), Grady Tate (tracks 3, 5, 9, 10 & 13–15) - drums
- Artie Butler, Bobby Rosengarden - percussion (tracks 3, 14 & 15)
- Paul Gershman, David Mankovitz, David Nadien, Gerald Tarack - violin (tracks 5, 9, 10 & 13)
- Bernard Zaslav - viola (tracks 5, 9, 10 & 13)
- Charles McCracken - cello (tracks 5, 9, 10 & 13)
- Additional unidentified brass, strings and chorus arranged and conducted by Claus Ogerman (tracks 3, 14 & 15) and Richard Evans (tracks 1, 2 & 4–13)
