= The Stockholm Concert =

Live album by Stan Getz Quartet
- Released: 1989
- Recorded: February 18, 1983; Södra Teatern, Stockholm, Sweden
- Genre: Jazz
- Length: 44:40
- Label: Sonet; SNTF 1019
- Producer: Rune Öfwerman

Stan Getz chronology
Line for Lyons (1983)	The Stockholm Concert (1989)	Quintessence Volume 1 (1983)

The Stockholm Concert is a live album by saxophonist Stan Getz which was recorded in Sweden in 1983 and released on the Swedish Sonet label in 1989.

== Reception ==
Professional ratings
Review scores
Source	Rating
Allmusic	3/5 stars

The Allmusic review said "If anything, Getz's tone became even more luscious through the years yet he never seemed to lose his fire".

== Track listing ==
1. "How Long Has This Been Going On?" (George Gershwin, Ira Gershwin) - 5:55
2. "I'll Remember April" (Gene de Paul, Patricia Johnston, Don Raye) - 11:09
3. "Blood Count" (Billy Strayhorn) - 5:04
4. "O Grande Amor" (Antônio Carlos Jobim, Vinícius de Moraes) - 6:36
5. "We'll Be Together Again" (Carl T. Fischer, Frankie Laine) - 7:29
6. "The Baggage Room Blues" (Alec Wilder, Arnold Sundgaard) - 8:27

== Personnel ==
- Stan Getz - tenor saxophone
- Jim McNeely - piano
- George Mraz - bass
- Victor Lewis - drums
