= Nobody Else but Me (album) =

Studio album by Stan Getz
- Released: September 27, 1994
- Recorded: March 4, 1964
- Studio: Van Gelder, Englewood Cliffs, New Jersey
- Genre: Jazz
- Length: 54:13
- Label: Verve; 314 521 660-2
- Producer: Creed Taylor

Stan Getz chronology
Reflections (1963)	Nobody Else but Me (1994)	Stan Getz & Bill Evans (1964)

Nobody Else but Me is a studio album by American saxophonist Stan Getz, recorded in 1964 but not released until 1994, because of "the enormous success of Getz's Brazilian music" at the time.

Professional ratings
Review scores
Source	Rating
AllMusic	3/5 stars
The Penguin Guide to Jazz Recordings	4/4 stars

== Track listing ==
1. "Summertime" (George Gershwin, Ira Gershwin, DuBose Heyward) – 7:00
2. "6-Nix-Quix-Flix" (Gary Burton) – 6:28
3. "Here's That Rainy Day" (Jimmy Van Heusen, Johnny Burke) – 5:09
4. "Waltz for a Lovely Wife" (Phil Woods) – 6:51
5. "Out of Focus" (Gary Burton) – 7:09
6. "Nobody Else but Me" (Jerome Kern, Oscar Hammerstein II) – 4:13
7. "Sweet Sorrow" (Michael Gibbs) – 6:06
8. "Little Girl Blue" (Richard Rodgers, Lorenz Hart) – 3:41
9. "What Is This Thing Called Love?" (Cole Porter) – 4:26
10. "Waltz for a Lovely Wife" [Single Version] – 3:10

== Personnel ==
- Stan Getz – tenor saxophone
- Gary Burton – vibraphone
- Gene Cherico – bass
- Joe Hunt – drums
