= Billy Highstreet Samba =

Studio album by Stan Getz
- Released: 1990
- Recorded: November 4, 1981; Studio Davout, Paris, France
- Genre: Jazz
- Length: 62:38
- Label: EmArcy; 838 771 2
- Producer: Stan Getz

Stan Getz chronology
Spring Is Here (1981)	Billy Highstreet Samba (1990)	Blue Skies (1982)

Billy Highstreet Samba is an album by saxophonist Stan Getz, recorded in Paris in 1981 and released on the EmArcy label in 1990.

== Reception ==
Professional ratings
Review scores
Source	Rating
AllMusic	2.5/5 stars
The Penguin Guide to Jazz Recordings	3.5/4 stars
Select	3/5

The AllMusic review by Scott Yanow stated, "Not essential music but a fine example of Getz's flexibility and creative instincts".

== Track listing ==
1. "Hospitality Creek" (Mitchel Forman) - 9:49
2. "Anytime Tomorrow" (Chuck Loeb) - 6:02
3. "Be There Then" (Loeb) - 8:10
4. "Billy Highstreet Samba" (Loeb) - 6:01
5. "The Dirge" (Forman) - 7:04
6. "Page Two" (Loeb) - 8:59
7. "Body and Soul" (Johnny Green, Frank Eyton, Edward Heyman, Robert Sour) - 6:27
8. "Tuesday Next" (Loeb) - 10:06 (CD Bonus Track)

== Personnel ==
- Stan Getz - tenor saxophone (all tracks), soprano saxophone (tracks 3 and 5)
- Mitchel Forman - keyboards
- Chuck Loeb - guitar
- Mark Egan - electric bass
- Victor Lewis - drums
- Bobby Thomas - percussion
