= Children of the World (Stan Getz album) =

Studio album by Stan Getz
- Released: 1979
- Recorded: December 20–21, 1978; Los Angeles, California
- Genre: Jazz
- Length: 54:33
- Label: Columbia; JC 35992
- Producer: Stan Getz

Stan Getz chronology
Mort d'un Pourri (1977)	Children of the World (1979)	Forest Eyes (1978)

Children of the World is an album by saxophonist Stan Getz that features compositions by Lalo Schifrin to commemorate the International Year of the Child. It was recorded in 1978 and released on the Columbia label. The album cover art features Charles M. Schulz's Peanuts cartoon of Snoopy on saxophone and Schroeder on piano.

== Reception ==
Professional ratings
Review scores
Source	Rating
AllMusic	2/5 stars

The Globe and Mail wrote that "Schifrin's compositions are tuneful and his arrangements, using strings and voices in places, are lilting and light."

The AllMusic review by Scott Yanow stated: "It is not the electronics of Andy LaVerne that is bothersome on this LP but the poppish material (which includes the theme from Evita) and the excessive amount of keyboardists and guitarists. Stan Getz cannot be blamed for trying something new (he even uses an Echoplex sparingly) and his cool-toned tenor is in fine form but the overall results are rather forgettable".

== Track listing ==
All compositions by Lalo Schifrin except where noted.

1. "Don't Cry for Me Argentina" (Andrew Lloyd Webber, Tim Rice) – 4:31
2. "Children of the World" – 5:36
3. "Livin' It Up" – 5:27
4. "Street Tattoo" (Schifrin, Gale Garnett) – 5:14
5. "Hopscotch" – 3:21
6. "On Rainy Afternoons" (Schifrin, Alan Bergman, Marilyn Bergman) – 2:39
7. "You, Me and the Spring" – 6:45
8. "Summer Poem" – 8:21
9. "The Dreamer" – 5:46
10. "Around the Day in Eighty Worlds" – 6:53

== Personnel ==
- Stan Getz – tenor saxophone, echoplex
- Andy LaVerne – piano, electric piano, keyboards
- Lalo Schifrin – piano, arranger, conductor
- Sonny Burke (tracks 1, 4 & 6), Mike Long, Clark Spangler – synthesizer
- Mike Melvoin – electric piano
- Dennis Budimir, Paul Jackson (tracks 1, 4 & 6), Tim May – guitar
- Stanley Clarke (tracks 1 & 4), Abe Laboriel – electric bass
- Victor Jones – drums
- Larry Bunker, Paulinho da Costa, Steve Forman (tracks 1 & 4), Joe Porcaro, Bob Zimmitti (tracks 1 & 4) – percussion
- Marc Bell, Douglas Colvin, John Cummings, Tommy Erdelyi, Jeff Hyman, Richie Reinhardt, Christopher Joseph Ward – vocals (track 5)
