= Line for Lyons =

Live album by Stan Getz and Chet Baker
- Released: 1983
- Recorded: February 18, 1983; Södra Teatern, Stockholm, Sweden
- Genre: Jazz
- Length: 51:03
- Label: Sonet; SNTF 899
- Producer: Rune Öfwerman

Stan Getz chronology
| Poetry (1983) | Line for Lyons (1983) | The Stockholm Concert (1983) |

Chet Baker chronology
| Out of Nowhere (1982) | Line for Lyons (1983) | Quintessence Volume 1 (1983) |

Line for Lyons is a live album by saxophonist Stan Getz and trumpeter Chet Baker, recorded in Sweden in 1983 and released on the Swedish Sonet label. The name of the album is based on the eponymous song by Gerry Mulligan, a tribute to Jimmy Lyons. Chet Baker played the song multiple times when he was part of Mulligan's lineup and it made its way into his standard repertoire.

== Reception ==
Professional ratings
Review scores
| Source | Rating |
|---|---|
| Allmusic | 4/5 stars |

Hugh Wyatt of the New York Daily News hailed Line for Lyons as "a candidate, eventually, for the collectors item category." Scott Yanow of AllMusic declared, "Although Getz and Baker ended up not getting along very well personally, their cool-toned musical personalities fit together perfectly as can be heard on a brief duet version of 'Line for Lyons'. The remainder of the set finds them successfully revisiting six standards from the 1950s, making one wish it had not been 25 years since their last collaboration".

== Track listing ==
1. "Just Friends" (John Klenner, Sam M. Lewis) - 8:20
2. "Stella by Starlight" (Victor Young, Ned Washington) - 5:25
3. "Airegin" (Sonny Rollins) - 8:30
4. "My Funny Valentine" (Richard Rodgers, Lorenz Hart) - 8:00
5. "Milestones" (Miles Davis) - 9:30
6. "Dear Old Stockholm" (Traditional) - 5:05
7. "Line for Lyons" (Gerry Mulligan) - 1:50

== Personnel ==
- Stan Getz - tenor saxophone
- Chet Baker - trumpet
- Jim McNeely - piano (tracks 1–6)
- George Mraz - bass (tracks 1–6)
- Victor Lewis - drums (tracks 1–6)
