= Forest Eyes =

Studio album by Stan Getz
- Released: 1980
- Recorded: November 1979
- Studio: Dureco Studios in Weesp, Netherlands and Fendal Recording Studios in Loenen aan de Vecht, Netherlands
- Genre: Jazz
- Length: 36:38
- Label: CBS; CBS 84113
- Producer: Jurre Haanstra and Ruud Jacobs

Stan Getz chronology
Children of the World (1978)	Forest Eyes (1980)	The Dolphin (1981)

Forest Eyes is an album by saxophonist Stan Getz featuring compositions by Jurre Haanstra, several of which featured in Bert Haanstra's film "Een Pak Slaag", which was recorded in 1979 and originally released on the Dutch CBS label.

== Reception ==
Professional ratings
Review scores
Source	Rating
Allmusic	2/5 stars

The Allmusic review by Scott Yanow stated "The great tenor is in his usual professional form but none of the themes are all that memorable and his backing is pretty anonymous. It's not one of the essential Stan Getz albums". Doug Payne observed "Getz is typically lovely from start to finish. But brief as it is, Forest Eyes sadly never offers that one compositional moment that makes you feel this is anywhere near as significant as something like Focus".

== Track listing ==
All compositions by Jurre Haanstra.

1. "We Are Free" - 5:11
2. "Tails - Part 1 & 2" - 6:00
3. "Shades of Blue (Main Theme from the Bert Haanstra Film "Een Pak Slaag")" - 3:14
4. "Heron's Flight" - 4:02
5. "Forest Eyes" - 3:20
6. "Drowsy" - 4:07
7. "Silva (From the Film "Een Pak Slaag")" - 3:30
8. "Little Lady" - 4:00
9. "Eye of the Storm (From the Film "Een Pak Slaag")" - 2:52

== Personnel ==
- Stan Getz - tenor saxophone
- Jurre Haanstra - drums, percussion, piano, electric piano, arranger, conductor
- Unidentified orchestra - Benny Behr - concertmaster
- Rob van Kreeveld - piano, electric piano (tracks 1, 3, 4 & 5)
- Rob Franken - electric piano (track 2)
- Peter Schön - synthesizer (tracks 6 & 8)
- Henk Braaf (tracks 2 & 8), Chuck Loeb (track 6) - guitar
- Jan Hollestelle (track 6), Koos Serierse (tracks 1, 3, 4, & 5) - bass
- Paul Bagmeyer - bass guitar (tracks 2 & 8)
- Victor Jones (track 6) - drums
- Willy Tjon Ajong - percussion, electric piano (tracks 6 & 8)
