= Reflections (Stan Getz album) =

Studio album by Stan Getz
- Released: 1964
- Recorded: October 21, 22 & 28, 1963; New York City
- Genre: Jazz
- Length: 32:56
- Label: Verve; V/V6 8554
- Producer: Creed Taylor

Stan Getz chronology
Stan Getz with Guest Artist Laurindo Almeida (1963)	Reflections (1964)	Nobody Else but Me (1964)

Reflections is an album by saxophonist Stan Getz which was released on the Verve label in 1964.

== Reception ==
The AllMusic review by Pemberton Roach stated "A highly underrated and oft-ignored album, Reflections should be re-evaluated and viewed not as an acceptance of crass commercialism, but as a daring and brilliant artist's attempt to find pure music by blurring the boundaries between jazz and pop".

Professional ratings
Review scores
Source	Rating
AllMusic	3/5 stars
The Penguin Guide to Jazz Recordings	3/4 stars

== Track listing ==
1. "Moonlight in Vermont" (Karl Suessdorf, John Blackburn) – 2:25
2. "If Ever I Would Leave You" (Frederick Loewe, Alan Jay Lerner) – 2:14
3. "Love" (Ralph Blane, Hugh Martin) – 2:41
4. "Reflections" (Lalo Schifrin) – 2:42
5. "A Sleepin' Bee" (Harold Arlen, Truman Capote) – 2:41
6. "Charade" (Henry Mancini, Johnny Mercer) – 2:39
7. "Early Autumn" (Ralph Burns, Woody Herman, Johnny Mercer) – 4:01
8. "Penthouse Serenade (When We're Alone)" (Val Burton, Will Jason) – 3:14
9. "Spring Can Really Hang You Up the Most" (Tommy Wolf, Fran Landesman) – 3:57
10. "Nitetime Street" (Lalo Schifrin, Seymour Shifrin) – 3:53
11. "Blowin' in the Wind" (Bob Dylan) – 2:32
- Recorded in New York City on October 21, 1963 (tracks 3–5 & 8), October 22, 1963 (tracks 6, 7, 9 & 10), and October 28, 1963 (tracks 1, 2 & 11).

== Personnel ==
- Stan Getz – tenor saxophone
- Gary Burton – vibraphone (tracks 3–10)
- Kenny Burrell – guitar
- George Duvivier – bass
- Joe Hunt – drums
- Unidentified brass, strings, percussion and choir
- Claus Ogerman (tracks 1, 2 & 11), Lalo Schifrin (tracks 3–10) – arranger, conductor
