= Dynasty (Stan Getz album) =

Live album by Stan Getz
- Released: 1971
- Recorded: January 11 and March 15–17, 1971
- Venue: Ronnie Scott's Jazz Club, London, United Kingdom
- Genre: Jazz
- Length: 92:46
- Label: Verve; V6 8802
- Producer: George Martin

Stan Getz chronology
Marrakesh Express (1970)	Dynasty (1971)	Change of Scenes (1971)

Dynasty is a live album by saxophonist Stan Getz, recorded in London and released on the Verve label in 1971 as a double album.

== Reception ==
Professional ratings
Review scores
Source	Rating
AllMusic	4/5 stars
The Penguin Guide to Jazz Recordings	3.5/4 stars

The AllMusic review by Michael G. Nastos stated, "Dynasty represents an interesting period in the artistic life of Getz, well out of pure bop, in between his commercial successes with Brazilian music, and on the verge of another phase of his life with fusion pioneers like Chick Corea. This is highly recommended, a solid effort from top to bottom".

== Track listing ==
All compositions by Eddy Louiss except where noted.

1. "Dum! Dum!" (Eddy Louiss) - 13:18
2. "Ballad for Leo" (René Thomas) - 9:15
3. "Our Kind of Sabi" - 17:08
4. "Mona" (Albert Mangelsdorff) - 8:30
5. "Theme for Emmanuel" (Thomas) - 11:25
6. "Invitation" (Bronisław Kaper, Paul Francis Webster) - 4:37
7. "Ballad for My Dad" (Louiss, Thomas) - 3:12
8. "Song for Martine" (Eddy Louiss) - 10:52
9. "Dynasty" - 9:42
10. "I Remember Clifford" (Benny Golson) - 5:24 (bonus track - on 1989 CD reissue only)

== Personnel ==
- Stan Getz - tenor saxophone
- Eddy Louiss - organ
- René Thomas - guitar
- Bernard Lubat - drums
