= Voices (Stan Getz album) =

Studio album by Stan Getz
- Released: Late September 1967
- Recorded: December 2, 1966 (#1, 3–5, 7); December 8, 1966 (#2, 6, 8–11)
- Studio: Van Gelder Studio, Englewood Cliffs, New Jersey
- Genre: Jazz
- Length: 33:00
- Label: Verve; V6-8707
- Producer: Creed Taylor

Stan Getz chronology
The Stan Getz Quartet in Paris (1966)	Voices (1967)	Sweet Rain (1967)

Voices is a studio album by American saxophonist Stan Getz, recorded in 1966 and released the following year on Verve Records. It features a chorus singing a chromatic, wordless accompaniment in place of a traditional string-section orchestration.

Professional ratings
Review scores
Source	Rating
Allmusic	3/5 stars

== Track listing ==
1. "Once" - 2:50
2. "I Didn't Know What Time It Was" - 3:24
3. "Nica's Dream" - 3:57
4. "Little Rio" - 2:30
5. "Keep Me in Your Heart" - 4:01
6. "Zigeuner Song" - 3:10
7. "I Want to Live" - 2:54
8. "Where Flamingos Fly" - 3:07
9. "Midnight Samba" - 2:13
10. "Infinidad" - 2:09
11. "Darling Joe" - 2:45

== Personnel ==
- Stan Getz - tenor saxophone
- Herbie Hancock - piano
- Jim Hall - guitar
- Ron Carter - bass
- Grady Tate - drums
- Bill Horwath - cymbalon
- Artie Butler, Bobby Rosengarden - percussion
- Claus Ogerman - arranger, conductor
- Unidentified chorus
