= Didn't We (album) =

Studio album by Stan Getz
- Released: Early December 1969
- Recorded: September–October 1969; New York City
- Genre: Jazz
- Length: 41:36
- Label: Verve; V6-8780
- Producer: Johnny Pate

Stan Getz chronology
The Song Is You (1969)	Didn't We (1969)	Marrakesh Express (1970)

Didn't We is a studio album by American saxophonist Stan Getz, recorded in 1969 for Verve Records. It features Getz improvising jazz standards with a full orchestra conducted by Johnny Pate.

Professional ratings
Review scores
Source	Rating
Allmusic	3/5 stars

== Track listing ==
1. "Didn't We" (Jimmy Webb) - 3:34
2. "The Shining Sea" (Johnny Mandel) - 3:13
3. "The Night Has a Thousand Eyes" (Bernier, Brainin) - 4:48
4. "Go Away, Little Girl" (Goffin, King) - 3:30
5. "Heartstrings" (Milt Jackson) - 5:52
6. "I Remember Clifford" (Golson) - 3:21
7. "Try to Understand" (Johnny Pate) - 2:38
8. "Emily" (Mandel, Mercer) - 3:39
9. "Mandy Is Two" (Fulton McGrath, Mercer) - 3:50
10. "What's New" (Haggart, Burke) - 4:11

== Personnel ==
- Stan Getz - tenor saxophone
- Johnny Pate - arranger, conductor
- Unidentified orchestra
