= Walter Gross (musician) =

American songwriter

- Walter Gross, c. 1950s

Background information
- Born: Walter Kalish Gross; July 14, 1909; Brooklyn, New York, U.S.
- Died: November 27, 1967 (aged 58) Los Angeles, California
- Genre: Jazz
- Occupations: Musician, composer, songwriter, arranger, conductor
- Instrument: Piano
- Labels: Bluebird, MGM, ABC-Paramount, Musicraft, Royale

Walter Gross (July 14, 1909 – November 27, 1967) is best known for having composed the music for the popular 1946 song "Tenderly". In addition to composing dozens of other titles, he was also a pianist, arranger, orchestra leader, and record industry executive.

== Biography ==
Born in New York City, Gross gave his first piano recital at age 10. In 1923, he had a 15-minute piano program on radio station WEAF in New York City.

He began performing professionally in the early 1930s, and played piano in bands led by Paul Whiteman, Andre Kostelanetz, Tommy Dorsey, and Raymond Scott. He was also a staff pianist on CBS radio in the 1930s. In 1942, Gross led the orchestra for Frank Sinatra's CBS program, Reflections.

After serving in the military during World War II, Gross became an executive at Musicraft Records, where he served as conductor, arranger, and pianist for recording sessions. In 1946, he was approached by noted lyricist Jack Lawrence, who asked permission to add words to an untitled melody Gross had composed. At first Gross was reluctant to cooperate, and after Lawrence presented his finished lyrics, Gross expressed dissatisfaction with the words and title. Lawrence eventually succeeded in finding a publisher for the new work, and shortly thereafter it was recorded by Sarah Vaughan. While it was a modest hit, the song was Vaughan's first solo chart success and marked her transition from jazz artist to popular singing star.

"Tenderly" continued to find favor with jazz and pop musicians over the next few years. However, when vocalist Rosemary Clooney recorded it for Columbia Records in 1952, it became a million-seller and entered the repertoire of pop standards. Clooney later remarked, "Technically, it's the most satisfying record I ever made." Over the years the composition has been recorded by Billie Holiday, Nat "King" Cole, Tony Bennett, Louis Armstrong, Ella Fitzgerald, Chet Baker, Duke Ellington, Bill Evans, Oscar Peterson, Kenny Burrell, Lionel Hampton, Stan Kenton, Eric Dolphy, The Dominoes, Vic Damone, and Chet Atkins. Joan Crawford sang it over the opening credits in the 1953 film Torch Song.

Some of Gross's other compositions include "Your Love," "I'm in a Fog About You," "Mexican Moon," "How Will I Remember You" and "Just a Moon Ago." His lyric collaborators included Carl Sigman, Bobby Troup, and Ned Washington. He played piano for Maxine Sullivan, Alec Wilder (as a member of his Octet), and others, and conducted orchestra for singers Gordon MacRae, Mel Tormé, and Phil Brito. He recorded solo piano singles in the early 1940s for the Bluebird label, including his original compositions "Creepy Weepy," "Improvisation in Several Keys," and "A Slight Case of Ivory." He also recorded for the MGM, ABC-Paramount, and Royale labels.

Gross relocated to California during the '50s, and made occasional club appearances on the west coast.

== Death ==
Gross died November 17, 1967, in St. Joseph's Hospital in Burbank, California, after being found unconscious in his apartment in Los Angeles, California.
