= The Dolphin (album) =

Live album by Stan Getz
- Released: 1981
- Recorded: May 10, 1981
- Venue: Keystone Korner, San Francisco, California
- Genre: Jazz
- Length: 48:16
- Label: Concord Jazz; CJ 158
- Producer: Carl Jefferson

Stan Getz chronology
Forest Eyes (1979)	The Dolphin (1981)	Spring Is Here (1981)

The Dolphin is a live album by tenor saxophonist Stan Getz, which was recorded at the Keystone Korner in San Francisco and released on the Concord Jazz label in 1981.

== Background ==
Getz had just moved to San Francisco and left Columbia Records, which had been emphasizing "commercial considerations" in its recordings of the saxophonist. Getz moved to the small, independent Concord label because of its devotion to "pure jazz". For his first recording for his new label, he returned to his classic quartet format with an acoustic pianist and said, "Lou Levy has been my choice as a pianist ever since 1948, when we worked together in Woody Herman's band. He went on to great successes backing Ella, Peggy, all the top jazz singers, but now he's back where he should have been all along." In a number of performances by the quartet, Getz allowed Levy to finish pieces with a piano solo instead of returning, as per typical practice, to play himself.

Levy said of Getz at this time, "He is the complete player. He has perfect intonation and technique and an unsurpassed ear. When I throw substitution chords at him—upside down, inside or out, or even wrong—he'll grab them and match them. His horn is an extension of his head. He's the Jascha Heifetz of the tenor sax. If Stan has a flaw, it's that he's flawless."

Concord issued additional recordings from this performance in 1992, the year after Getz's death, as the album Spring Is Here.

== Reception ==
Professional ratings
Review scores
Source	Rating
Allmusic	3/5 stars
The Penguin Guide to Jazz Recordings	3.5/4 stars
The Rolling Stone Jazz Record Guide	3/5 stars

The AllMusic review by Scott Yanow states, "Stan Getz's first recording for Concord finds him returning to the strictly acoustic straightahead format .... Getz is in particularly fine form on the title cut, 'Joy Spring' and 'The Night Has a Thousand Eyes'".

Getz biographer Donald L. Maggin wrote, "These circumstances produced [Getz's] best recorded work since the memorable month of October 1975, when he made The Peacocks and The Master, the two outstanding albums of his five Columbia years."

Dave Gelly, another Getz biographer, compared Getz's playing on this album with his early recordings, saying, "The harmonies are more adventurous and Getz's playing, while still gloriously clear in outline, is much more ornate. His tone, by this stage of his life, had reached a level of warmth and flexibility which would have been impossible to foresee in 1950."

== Track listing ==
1. "The Dolphin" (Luiz Eça) - 9:49
2. "A Time for Love" (Johnny Mandel, Paul Francis Webster) - 6:40
3. "Joy Spring" (Clifford Brown) - 9:40
4. "My Old Flame" (Sam Coslow, Arthur Johnston) - 6:36
5. "The Night Has a Thousand Eyes" (Jerry Brainin, Buddy Bernier) - 8:24
6. "Close Enough for Love" (Mandel, Paul Williams) - 7:07

== Personnel ==
- Stan Getz - tenor saxophone
- Lou Levy - piano
- Monty Budwig - bass
- Victor Lewis - drums
