= Johnny Smith =

American jazz guitarist (1922–2013)

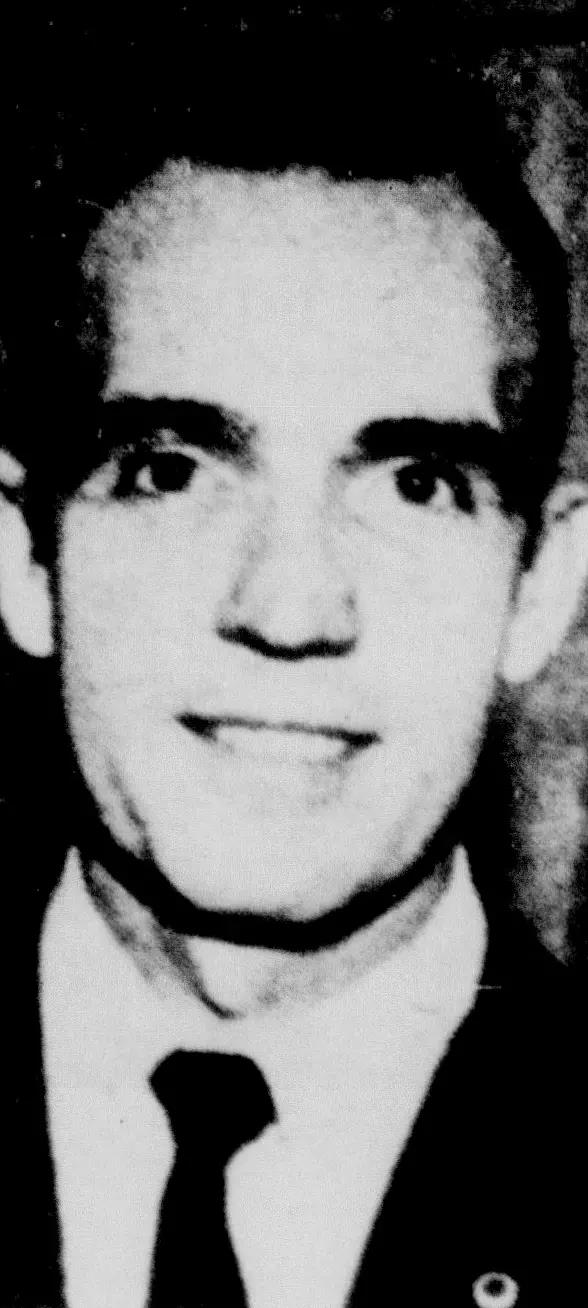
- Smith c. 1962

Background information
- Born: John Henry Smith II; June 25, 1922; Birmingham, Alabama, U.S.
- Died: June 11, 2013 (aged 90) Colorado Springs, Colorado, U.S.
- Genres: Jazz
- Occupation: Musician
- Instrument: Guitar
- Years active: 1935–1992
- Labels: Roost Records, Roulette Records, Verve Records, Concord Records
- Website: johnnysmith.org

Johnny Henry Smith II (June 25, 1922 – June 11, 2013) was an American cool jazz and mainstream jazz guitarist. He wrote "Walk, Don't Run" in 1954. In 1984, Smith was inducted into the Alabama Jazz Hall of Fame.

== Early life ==
During the Great Depression, Smith's family moved from Birmingham, Alabama, where Smith was born, through several cities and ending up in Portland, Maine.

He taught himself to play guitar in pawnshops, which let him play in exchange for keeping the guitars in tune. At 13 he was teaching others to play the guitar. One of his students bought a new guitar and gave him his old guitar, which became the first guitar Smith owned.

Smith joined Uncle Lem and the Mountain Boys, a local hillbilly band which traveled around Maine, performing at dances, fairs, and similar venues. He earned four dollars a night. He dropped out of high school to accommodate the enterprise. Having become increasingly interested in the jazz bands which he heard on the radio, Smith gradually moved away from country music towards playing jazz. He left The Mountain Boys when he was 18 to join a variety trio called the Airport Boys.

== Military experience ==
Having learned to fly from pilots he befriended, Smith enlisted in the United States Army Air Forces in the hopes of becoming a military pilot. He was invalidated from the flight program because of imperfect vision in his left eye. Given a choice between joining the military band and being sent to mechanic's school, Smith opted to join the military band. He claimed that they gave him a cornet, an Arban's instructional book, and two weeks to meet the standard which included being able to read music. Determined not to go to mechanic's school, Smith spent the two weeks practicing the cornet in the latrine, as recommended by the bandleader and passed the examination.

== Career ==
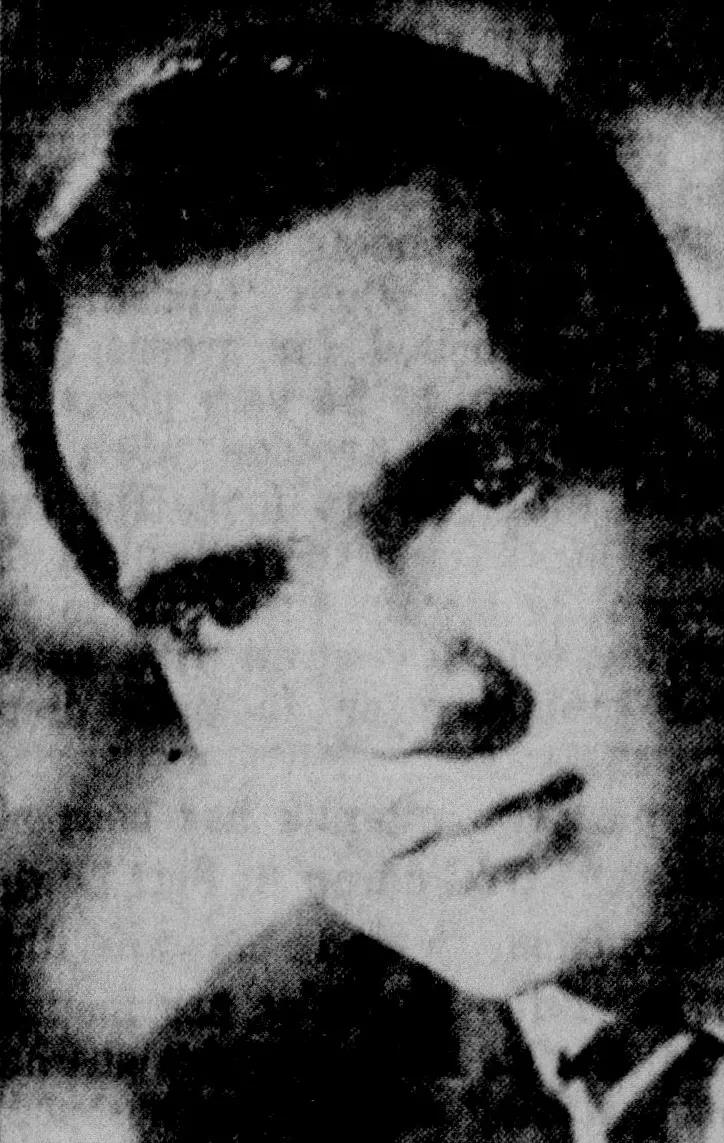
Smith c. 1955

An extremely diverse musician, Johnny Smith was equally at home playing in the Birdland, a jazz club, or sight-reading scores in the orchestral pit of the New York Philharmonic. From Schoenberg to Gershwin to originals, Smith was one of the most versatile guitarists of the 1950s. As a staff studio guitarist and arranger for NBC from 1946 to 1951, and on a freelance basis thereafter until 1958, Smith played in a variety of settings from solo to full orchestra and had his own trio, The Playboys, with Mort Lindsey and Arlo Hults. Smith's playing is characterized by closed-position chord voicings and rapidly ascending lines (reminiscent of Django Reinhardt, but more diatonic than chromatically-based).

Smith's most critically acclaimed recording was of the song "Moonlight in Vermont", and featured tenor saxophonist Stan Getz. The single was the second most popular jazz record in DownBeat's readers' poll for 1952. Initially released as a track on the 10-inch LP Jazz at NBC (Roost RLP 410), "Moonlight in Vermont" was later made the title track of a 1956 12 inch LP. From 1952 and into the 1960s he recorded for the Roost Records, on whose releases his reputation mainly rests. Mosaic Records issued the majority of them in an 8-CD set in 2002.

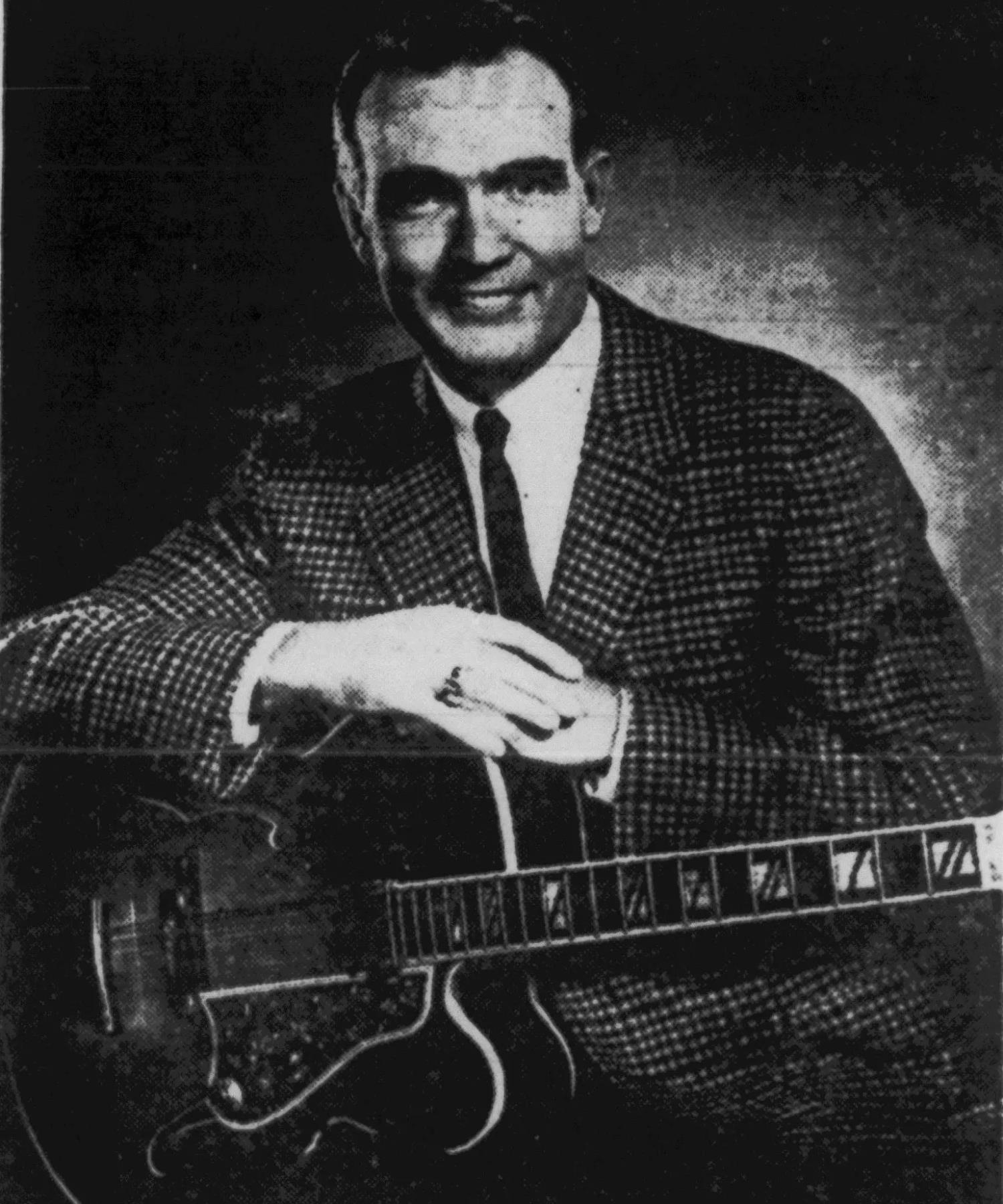
Smith c. 1970

His best-known musical composition is the track "Walk Don't Run", written for a 1954 recording session as a contrafact to "Softly, as in a Morning Sunrise". Guitarist Chet Atkins covered the track, recording a neo-classical rendition of the song on the electric guitar for his Hi Fi in Focus album which preceded the Ventures' hit by three years. He played his arrangement fingerstyle, including the bass notes A, G, F, and E, the notes of an Andalusian cadence which later became the basis for the Ventures' arrangement.

The musicians who became the Ventures heard the Atkins version, rearranged it pop style, and recorded it in 1959 on their own Blue Horizon label. The Ventures version gained popularity locally and was distributed by Dolton Records by way of Liberty Records and went nationally in the U.S. to No.2 on the Billboard Top 100 for a week in September 1960. The Ventures recorded the track again with a new arrangement as "Walk: Don't Run! '64" and achieved another gold record when it reach the Billboard Top 10. Smith personally expressed his gratefulness to Atkins and The Ventures for providing Smith with the bountiful royalties he received from their recordings.

In 1957, Smith's wife died in childbirth, along with his second child. He sent his young daughter to Colorado Springs, Colorado to be cared for temporarily by his mother, and in 1958 he left his busy performing career in New York City to join his daughter in Colorado. There, Smith ran a musical instruments store, taught music, and continued to record albums for the Royal Roost Records and Verve Records into the 1960s. He told the Colorado Springs Independent in 2001 (as quoted in his New York Times obituary) "In the end, everything came down to the fact that I loved my daughter too much to let my career put her at risk. But there were other factors, too. I loved New York musically, but I hated living there." Paul Vitello observed, "Smith continued to record, and sometimes performed in Colorado nightclubs, but declined almost all invitations to tour. One exception was for Bing Crosby, whom he accompanied on a tour of England in 1977 that ended shortly before Crosby's death."

== Death and legacy ==
In 1998, Smith was awarded the James Smithson Bicentennial Medal for his contribution to music; the citation singled out "the genesis of 'Walk, Don't Run'," as well as "his manifold accomplishments" and their "profound and pervasive influence on the role of the guitar in contemporary popular culture."

Smith died of complications from a fall at his home in Colorado Springs at the age of 90. In 2018, Tzadik Records released The Maid With The Flaxen Hair: A Tribute To Johnny Smith by guitarists Mary Halvorson and Bill Frisell. The album features songs written by or played by Johnny Smith. Frisell had been a student of Smith in the 1970s.

== Signature guitars ==
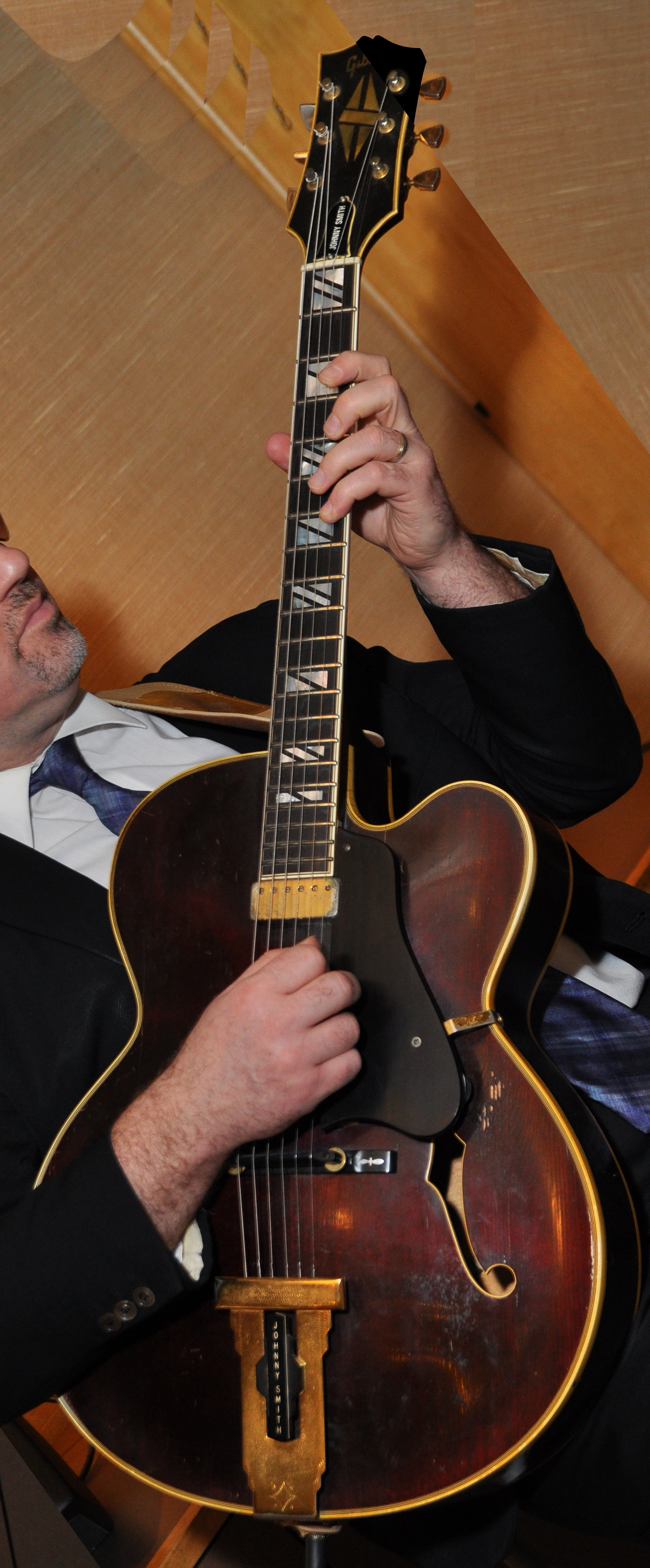
A Gibson Johnny Smith (LeGrand)

Guild, Gibson, and Heritage Guitars have all made guitar models which were endorsed by Johnny Smith. In each case, the guitar was designed wholly or in part by Smith. Each design was a full-bodied archtop guitar with a top carved from solid spruce and a back and sides made of solid maple. All of the on-board electronics for each guitar, from the small pickup in the neck position through the volume knob to the output jack, were mounted on the pickguard.

Smith claimed to have learned about guitar design by observing master luthier John D'Angelico, who was his friend and guitar supplier when he lived in New York City.

=== Guild Johnny Smith Award ===
In 1955, after discussions with Alfred Dronge, chairman and founder of the Guild Guitar, Smith designed a guitar and sent the drawings and specifications to Dronge. The Guild designers modified it (to Smith's dissatisfaction), and manufactured the resulting guitar as the Guild Johnny Smith Award.

=== Gibson Johnny Smith ===
In 1961, Ted McCarty, then president of Gibson, went to meet the retired Smith at his home in Colorado Springs. McCarty spent several days with Smith, during which time Smith designed the guitar he wanted built. The design was accepted by Gibson with a few minor cosmetic changes which were acceptable to Smith. Gibson began production of the resulting Gibson Johnny Smith model in 1961. Guild continued to produce their Johnny Smith guitar under the model name Guild Artist Award.

=== Heritage Johnny Smith ===
When Gibson moved its manufacturing facilities from Kalamazoo, Michigan to Nashville, several of their managers and artisans chose to stay behind. Many of the ex-employees formed Heritage Guitars and bought the old Kalamazoo factory from Gibson. Given a choice between Gibson and Heritage building the guitar which had his name, Smith chose to stay with the old artisans at the old location under new ownership. The Heritage Johnny Smith model was introduced in 1989. Like Guild before them, Gibson continued to manufacture their version of the Johnny Smith design with a new name: the Gibson LeGrand.

=== Guild Johnny Smith Award by Benedetto ===
William Schultz, chairman of Fender Musical Instruments Corporation of which Guild Guitars was a subsidiary, asked Smith if he would be willing to return his endorsement to the Guild Artist Award. Familiar with Schultz's management and knowing that the construction would be supervised by master luthier Bob Benedetto, Smith agreed. The Guild Johnny Smith Award by Benedetto was available through Guild dealers until early 2006 when Benedetto left Fender. Unlike Guild and Gibson, Heritage Guitars discontinued manufacture of their Smith-designed guitar after Smith withdrew his endorsement.

== Discography ==
=== As leader ===
- Jazz at NBC Series (Johnny Smith Quintet featuring Stan Getz) Royal Roost, 1952, 10" LP
- Jazz at NBC Series, Vol. 2 (Johnny Smith Quintet featuring Stan Getz) (Royal Roost, 1953) 10" LP
- In a Mellow Mood (Roost Records, 1954) 10" LP
- In a Sentimental Mood (Roost, 1954) 10" LP
- Johnny Smith Plays Jimmy Van Heusen (Roost, 1955)
- The Johnny Smith Quartet (Roost, 1955)
- The New Johnny Smith Quartet (Roost, 1956)
- The Johnny Smith Foursome (Roost, 1957)
- The Johnny Smith Foursome, Volume II (Roost, 1957)
- Flower Drum Song (Roost, 1958)
- Easy Listening (Roost, 1959)
- Johnny Smith Favorites (Roost, 1959)
- Designed for You (Roost, 1959)
- My Dear Little Sweetheart (with the Irwin Kostal Orchestra) Roost, 1960)
- Guitar & Strings (with the Irwin Kostal Orchestra) Roost, 1960)
- Johnny Smith Plus The Trio (Roost, 1960)
- The Sound of the Johnny Smith Guitar (Roost, 1961)
- The Man with the Blue Guitar (Roost, 1962)
- Reminiscing (Roost, 1965)
- Johnny Smith (Verve Records, 1967)
- Johnny Smith's Kaleidoscope (Verve, 1968)
- Phase II (Verve, 1968)

Compilation albums

- Moonlight in Vermont (Roost, 1956) tracks from the two Jazz at NBC issues of 1952–53
- Moods Moods Moods (Roost, 1956) tracks from the two In a...Mood issues of 1954
- The Guitar World of Johnny Smith (Roost, 1964)
- The Complete Roost Johnny Smith Small Group Sessions (Mosaic Records, 2002) 8-CD set
- Walk, Don't Run (Roulette Records/EMI Records, 2005)

=== As sideman ===
With Stan Getz

- The Complete Roost Recordings (Blue Note Records, 1950–1954 [1997]) 3-CD set

With Hank Jones

- Urbanity (Clef Records, 1947–1953 [1956])

With Beverley Kenney

- Beverley Kenney Sings for Johnny Smith (Roost, 1955)

With Ruth Price

- Ruth Price Sings with the Johnny Smith Quartet (Roost, 1956)

With Jeri Southern

- Jeri Southern Meets Johnny Smith (Roulette, 1958)

With Art Van Damme

- A Perfect Match (Columbia Records, 1963)
