= Bill Green (musician) =

American jazz woodwind player (1925–1996)

- An undated photo of Green

Background information
- Born: William Earnest Green; February 28, 1925; Kansas City, Kansas, U.S.
- Died: July 29, 1996 (aged 71) Los Angeles, California, U.S.
- Genres: Jazz
- Occupations: Musician; music educator
- Instruments: Saxophone; clarinet; flute
- Years active: 1950s–1996
- Label: Everest
- Education: Los Angeles Conservatory of Music and Arts

William Earnest Green (February 28, 1925, Kansas City, Kansas – July 29, 1996, Los Angeles) was an American jazz multi-instrumentalist, session musician, and music educator.

Green began playing the alto saxophone at age ten and the clarinet when he was 12; he eventually learned to play most varieties of saxophone, clarinet, and flute. He served in the military until 1946, then began working at a club called Small's in Kansas City. In 1947, he moved to Los Angeles and enrolled at the Los Angeles Conservatory of Music and Arts, graduating in 1952. He remained on staff as an educator there until 1962. He also ran a music education studio on La Brea Avenue in Los Angeles for many years.

Early in his career, he performed with Gerald Wilson and began working with Benny Carter in the latter half of the 1950s. From 1959 to 1962, he played in Louie Bellson's big band, and he worked extensively as a section player in the bands of musicians such as Quincy Jones, Henry Mancini, and Buddy Rich. He also accompanied vocalists such as Frank Sinatra, Tony Bennett, Nat King Cole, Nancy Wilson, and Dionne Warwick. He played at the Monterey Jazz Festival with Gil Fuller in 1965 and worked with Oliver Nelson in 1966 and Blue Mitchell in 1969. In the 1970s, he performed or recorded with Gene Ammons, the Capp-Pierce Juggernaut, Ella Fitzgerald, Sonny Rollins, and Sarah Vaughan. He continued working with the Capp-Pierce orchestra in the early 1980s, as well as with Lionel Hampton, Woody Herman, and the Clayton–Hamilton Jazz Orchestra. Green also appeared as the pianist on Episode 33, Season 6, of Bonanza, and as a street musician in Episode 7, Season 4, of The Golden Girls.

Outside of jazz, Green worked as a studio musician backing numerous pop acts during the 1960s–1980s. He recorded as a section player on albums for Randy Newman, The Beach Boys, Carole King, Willie Hutch, Melba Moore, Captain & Tennille, Herb Alpert, Harry Nilsson, The Temptations, Marvin Gaye, Johnny Mathis & Deniece Williams, Gloria Gaynor, Patrice Rushen, La Toya Jackson, Lionel Richie, David Byrne, The Isley Brothers, and Smokey Robinson, among many others.

Green's personal papers and recordings are held in an archive at the University of California, Los Angeles (UCLA).

== Discography ==
=== As leader ===
- Shades of Green (Everest, 1963) – as William Green & the Marty Jazz All Stars

=== As sideman ===
With Benny Carter

- Aspects (United Artists, 1959)

With Buddy Collette

- Man of Many Parts (Contemporary, 1957)

With Bobby Darin

- Venice Blue (Capitol, 1965)

With Carmen McRae

- Carmen for Cool Ones (Decca, 1958)

With Chico Hamilton

- Chic Chic Chico (Impulse!, 1965)

With the Gene Harris All-Star Big Band

- Tribute to Count Basie (Concord Jazz, 1988)

With Fred Katz

- Soul° Cello (Decca, 1958)

With the Gerald Wilson Orchestra

- Progressive Sounds by Gerald Wilson (Federal, 1954)
- Big Band Modern (Audio Lab, 1959)
- The Golden Sword – Torero Impressions in Jazz (Pacific Jazz, 1966)
- Eternal Equinox (Pacific Jazz, 1969)

With Gil Fuller

- Gil Fuller & The Monterey Jazz Festival Orchestra Featuring Dizzy Gillespie (Pacific Jazz, 1965)
- Night Flight (Pacific Jazz, 1966) – Gil Fuller & the Monterey Jazz Festival Jazz Orchestra featuring James Moody

With Horace Silver

- Silver 'n Wood (Blue Note, 1976)

With Louie Bellson

- Around the World in Percussion (Roulette, 1961)
- Big Band Jazz from the Summit (Roulette, 1962)

With Sammy Davis Jr.

- The Wham of Sam (Reprise, 1961)

With Quincy Jones

- Roots (A&M, 1977)

With others

- Dingo (Warner Bros., 1991) with Miles Davis and Michel Legrand
