= Buddy Collette =

American jazz musician (1921–2010)

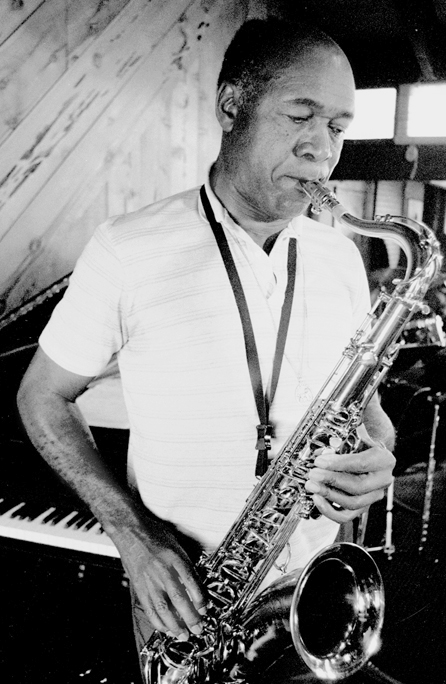
- Collette in 1985

Background information
- Born: William Marcel Collette; August 6, 1921; Los Angeles, California, U.S.
- Died: September 19, 2010 (aged 89) Los Angeles, California, U.S.
- Genres: West Coast jazz; cool jazz
- Occupations: Musician; educator
- Instruments: Flute; saxophone; clarinet
- Years active: 1941–1998
- Labels: Contemporary; Challenge; Mode; EmArcy
- Formerly of: Chico Hamilton band

William Marcel "Buddy" Collette (August 6, 1921 – September 19, 2010) was an American jazz flutist, saxophonist, clarinetist, and studio musician. He was a founding member of the Chico Hamilton Quintet.

== Early life ==
William Marcel Collette was born in Los Angeles on August 6, 1921. He grew up in Watts, surrounded by diverse people. He lived in a house built by his father on cheap land in the Central Gardens neighborhood. He attended the 96th Street School for black students.

Collette was initially inspired to be a musician by the Woodman brothers, Britt, Coney, and Bill, whose father had schooled them to be professional musicians by grade school. He and others who lived in the area, such as Charles Mingus, looked up to them as they could play multiple instruments and sight read, forming the sound of a much larger band. His family also encouraged him along. They had friends who played instruments that would come to the Collette house and jam. His parents also took him to see Louis Armstrong in concert which had a great impact on him.

Collette began playing piano at age ten, at his grandmother's request. His love for music came not only from his community, but from his parents—his father learned to play the alto saxophone in his adult years and his mother sang lead vocals in the church choir. Though he continued piano for two years, he "didn't like it" and switched to his brother's alto saxophone which he practiced hard on despite not having formal tutelage. Later, he reflected that his early piano training did give him a good foundation to make it in the grade school band.

During middle school, he began formally learning the saxophone. That same year, he formed his first band. They played the music of Dootsie Williams, which Collette's parents had received while at a party. The following year, Collette started a band with Ralph and Raleigh Bledsoe. Together they played for less than a dollar each at parties put on by people in the area on Saturday nights.

Following this, Collette started a third group which eventually included Charles Mingus on bass. He and Mingus became very good friends. Collette was a factor in getting Mingus to switch from cello to bass, as well as his development on the instrument. In Collette's first band at age twelve, Mingus was playing bass tuba and cello, but Collette wanted a stringed bass in the group he was putting together, as the popularity of bands using it was on the rise. He told Mingus, "If you get a bass, you'll have a job", meaning his chances in music would be high. In later years, Mingus would often ask Collette for guidance and advice.

At the age of 15, Collette became a part of the Woodman brothers' band, along with Joe Comfort, George Reed, and Jessie Sailes. One of his first professional gigs with the group was at The Follies, a Los Angeles burlesque club known for acts such as Joe Yule and showgirls such as Lili St. Cyr.

== Music career ==
Collette attended Los Angeles' Jordan High School and led the school's dance band. During his first few years of high school, he began traveling to Los Angeles in order to form connections with other musicians. At the Million Dollar Theatre, he and his band competed in a battle of the bands, but lost to a band that included Jackie Kelson, Chico Hamilton, and Al Adams. Afterwards, Collette was asked to join the winning band, making twenty-one dollars per week. Later, Charles Mingus joined this band. Collette took up clarinet around his last year of high school. During this time he decided to be a professional musician.

At the age of 19, Collette started taking musical lessons from Lloyd Reese, who also taught Eric Dolphy, Charles Mingus, and many others. Collette credited Reese with teaching him and the other musicians how to manage themselves in the music world. He studied with Reese for two years on saxophone, clarinet, and piano. Collette commented, "I owe a lot to him. He taught me chords, progressions, scales, harmony, etc. Before I went to Lloyd, I was just playing what I heard. I would listen for the chord, and then play it. I soon found out this didn't work all the time, because there were many piano players who didn't know the tunes either."

In 1941, age 20, he joined Cee Pee Johnson's band for a year until enlisting in the Navy. During World War II, Collette served with the U.S. Navy Band attached to the pre-flight school at St. Mary's College. Led by Marshal Royal, it was one of two regimental bands of African-American musicians. His bandmates included Jerome Richardson and Jackie Kelson. He worked his way up to co-leader next to Marshal Royal and attained the rank of Musician 1st Class. From that band of 45 musicians, two dance bands were formed, the first being the Bombardiers, led by Royal. The second dance band, the Topflighters, was led by Collette, who had been playing with Les Hite's band in 1941 before enlisting. His memoir records a trip that he, Bill Douglass, and Charles Mingus made from Los Angeles to San Francisco in October 1942, after hearing that a Navy officer was recruiting musicians from the union there to serve in an all-black band that would be stationed at St. Mary's.

Both Mingus and Douglass changed their minds, however. Douglass was later drafted by the Army; Mingus got re-classified 4-F. Collette, like most black Navy bandsmen, was trained at Camp Robert Smalls, at the Great Lakes, Chicago, complex of Navy bases.

According to Collette, he formed the second dance band at St. Mary's after he refused to join the Bombardiers on baritone saxophone, and along with most of the remaining fellows in the marching band, realized that the dance band service was much easier than general musicians duty. Also in his band were Orlando Stallings on saxophone; James Ellison, Myers Franchot Alexander, and Henry Godfrey on trumpet; George Lewis on first trombone; Ralph Thomas on bass tuba; and a few fellows he recalls only by nickname: "the Indian" on bass; "the Spider" and "the Crow" on tenor saxophones. It was during his time leading these dance bands that he began to hone his arranging and composition skills, as they often needed material to play.

Both dance bands played gigs at the Stage Door Canteen, the USO in San Francisco that featured 24-hour service and entertainment, as featured acts and as back-ups to the stars that were performing there, usually unannounced, when they were in the San Francisco area.

Willie Humphrey, a New Orleans Dixieland jazz legend, joined the marching band late. Collette recalls that Marshal Royal did not realize who he was and was not that interested in Dixieland, so Collette was able to get him into the Topflighters and subsequently arranged songs to highlight Humphrey's talent.

Collette and others from St. Mary's played at clubs around San Francisco, especially in Oakland and at Redwood City, south of San Francisco, while in the Navy. "When you're in uniform, you're not supposed to be working outside," he writes, "so we would get in civilian clothes—it was such a good job."

Discharged in December 1945, Collette stayed in the northern California area playing in a combo with Ernie Royal until hearing that Dizzy Gillespie and Charlie Parker were coming to Billy Berg's in L.A. (in a band that included Ray Brown, Al Haig, Milt Jackson, Stan Levey, and Lucky Thompson). He traveled down to hear them the first night of their performance. With all the new activity happening in L.A., he was anxious to return to the area.

In 1946, he formed the cooperative "The Stars of Swing" with Lucky Thompson, tenor; John Anderson, trumpet; Spaulding Givens, piano; Oscar Bradley, drums; and his two childhood friends Charles Mingus and Britt Woodman. Collette recalls that the group, which was formed and played out of the Downbeat Club, was so good that Charlie Parker and other musicians would be in the audience every night they performed. "I wish we could have recorded because we were way ahead then, playing a lot of stuff they are playing today."

After the group broke up for lack of work, Collette worked briefly with various groups such as Louis Jordan's, Gerald Wilson's big band, Johnny Otis's big band, and Benny Carter's band. He played baritone saxophone with Ivie Anderson and Her All-Stars and recorded in 1946. He also recorded with "Baron" Mingus and His Octet the same year.

From 1947 to 1952, he took up studies at the Los Angeles Conservatory, the American Operatic Laboratory, and the California Academy of Music, as well as with numerous private teachers such as Lyle Murphy, learning composition, arranging, and his instruments. He started playing the flute while at the Los Angeles Conservatory, and later studied with Martin Ruderman and Henry Woempner. He studied saxophone with Merle Johnston, clarinet with Soccorso Pirolo, and the Shillinger system of musical composition with Franklyn Marks. In 1948, he recorded his first record under his name with Dolphin's of Hollywood.

In 1949, Collette was the first black musician to be hired by a nationally broadcast TV studio orchestra, on You Bet Your Life, hosted by Groucho Marx. It has been noted that the conductor of the orchestra, Jerry Fielding, received hate mail for standing by Collette. Collette's job and job security on the popular television show signaled that opportunities were becoming more readily available for black musicians by the 1950s. In the 1950s, he worked as a studio musician with Frank Sinatra, Ella Fitzgerald, Duke Ellington, Count Basie, Nat King Cole, and Nelson Riddle.

Fielding formed a 13-piece dance band in 1952 as professional outlet for studio musicians, and Collette joined. He recorded with the Jerry Fielding Orchestra during the 1950s. He remained with the band until forming his own group in 1954, which included Larry Bunker, Ernie Freeman, and Buddy Woodson. The group went largely unnoticed by record companies and did not record.

After a successful two year spell with the Chico Hamilton group, Collette began his recording career as a group leader. His first albums included Tanganyika (co-led with Hamilton) and Man of Many Parts. He continued his work as a studio musician in Hollywood while performing as sideman and with his own units sporadically throughout the 1960s. in 1961, he made his first trip to Europe and recorded in Italy with the Basso-Valdambrini Band. He was active in music into the latter part of the century, working for jazz groups, screen productions and backing pop acts as a studio musician. In small jazz groups, he recorded an album with Japanese tenor saxophonist Konosuke Saijo and saxophone great Budd Johnson (with Gus Johnson, George Duvivier, Mundell Lowe, and Nat Pierce) in Japan in 1978 and with his student James Newton in 1988. In 1996, he led and performed in the Buddy Collette Big Band, a group that included many of his old associates such as Chico Hamilton, Fred Katz, Britt Woodman, Gerald Wilson, and Jackie Kelson. A stroke suffered in 1998, however, caused him to give up playing professionally.

== Musical collaborations and the Chico Hamilton Quintet ==
Increasingly successful in the late 1940s, Collette was called upon frequently for collaborations and recordings on alto saxophone with musicians such as Ivie Anderson, Johnny Otis, Gerald Wilson, Ernie Andrews, and Charles Mingus. Most notably, Collette and Mingus formed their first band in 1933, the driving force that convinced Mingus to switch from cello to bass. He went on to form a short-lived yet cooperative band in 1946 with Mingus called The Stars of Swing.

In 1948, he and reedman Bill Green started a Sunday jazz session out of the Crystal Tea Room in L.A. for young players who enjoyed jazz.

In 1955, Collette became a founding member of the unusually instrumented chamber jazz quintet, led by percussionist Chico Hamilton with guitarist Jim Hall, cellist and pianist Fred Katz, and bassist Carson Smith. The quintet was notable for having Katz as the band's centerpiece, leading Collette to refer to Katz as "the first jazz cello player". The group gained national prominence and became one of the most influential West Coast jazz bands, synonymous with the laidback "cool jazz" of the 1950s. In the quintet, Collette played the reeds (tenor and alto saxophones, flute, and clarinet). His clarinet work with Hamilton earned him the "New Star on Clarinet" award in DownBeat magazine's 1956 Jazz Critics' poll. In the summer of 1956, he left the Hamilton group to form his own unit out of The Haig in L.A. During this time, he also played reeds for Howard Rumsey's Lighthouse All-Stars, filling in for the departed Bud Shank.

In 1957, Hamilton's new group with Paul Horn on reeds and guitarist John Pisano made a cameo appearance in the Burt Lancaster-Tony Curtis film Sweet Smell of Success. Later that year, Collette collaborated with Horn in his own flutist ensemble, the Swinging Shepherds, a four flute lineup.

In November 1958, Langston Hughes read poems to accompaniment by Collette and his band at the Screen Directors Theatre in Los Angeles.

Collette was both present in the orchestra and helped write some of the music for Charles Mingus's infamous Town Hall Concert in 1962. Mingus asked his old friend to help with composing after trombonist and arranger Jimmy Knepper left, following Knepper's altercation with Mingus.

== Involvement in music unions ==
Around the early 1900s, Los Angeles was primarily divided into two music unions: Local 47, a union for white musicians, and Local 767, a union for black musicians. Collette and several other black musicians including Bill Green, Charles Mingus, Britt Woodman, and Milt Holland made concentrated efforts to merge the two unions into one color-blind union in the early 1950s. Initially, the merge existed as an interracial symphony performing at the Humanist Hall on Twenty-third and Union. This group received a great deal of publicity as iconic figures such as "Sweets" Edison, Nat King Cole, and Frank Sinatra provided public support for the interracial group. The success of this group led to the coalition of the two segregated locals.

Collette eventually made the board of Local 767, along with Bill Douglass as vice president. After three years of working with Leo Davis and James Petrillo, the presidents of Local 767 and Local 47 respectively, the two groups became what Collette calls an "amalgamation" of the two in 1953. This merging signified greater opportunity for these musicians in both careers and insurance benefits, as well as great racial advancement. Up to forty locals have since replicated this success elsewhere, which has allowed the talent of a musician as opposed to his/her race determine success.

== Death, legacy, and influence ==
Collette died in Los Angeles of heart failure at the age of 89.

Collette was active in education and taught a number of other musicians. His students included Mingus, James Newton, Eric Dolphy, Charles Lloyd, Sonny Criss, and Frank Morgan.

Collette joined the faculty at the California State University, Pomona, campus in 1992, where he was a conductor of the jazz and combo band. Collette held important faculty positions at CSULA, CSULB, California State University, Dominguez Hills, and was a musical director for the jazz band program at Loyola Marymount University.

He was designated a Los Angeles Living Cultural Treasure by the city of Los Angeles in the late 1990s, and, in the early 2000s, he was composing music for JazzAmerica, a band of teen jazz virtuosos he co-founded.

In 1996, when the Library of Congress commissioned Collette to write and perform a special big band concert to highlight his long career, he brought together some old collaborators to perform with him, including Chico Hamilton.

Collette's career and accomplishments were rewarded by the Los Angeles Jazz Society, where he received a special commendation, and with the Lifetime Achievement Award from the American Federation of Musicians, Local 47, for his musical contributions spanning four decades. Collette's legacy lives on through the JazzAmerica program, a non-profit organization which he co-founded in 1994 that aims at bringing jazz into classrooms in middle school and high schools in the greater Los Angeles area, tuition-free.

== Discography ==
=== As leader/co-leader ===
- Tanganyika (Dig, 1956)
- Man of Many Parts (Contemporary, 1956)
- Cool, Calm & Collette (ABC-Paramount, 1957)
- Everybody's Buddy (Challenge, 1957)
- Porgy & Bess (Interlude, 1957)
- Nice Day with Buddy Collette (Contemporary, 1957)
- Flute Fraternity (Mode, 1957) with Herbie Mann
- Aloha to Jazz (Bel Canto Records, 1957) – one side by The Polynesians
- Jazz Loves Paris (Specialty, 1958)
- Marx Makes Broadway (VSOP, 1958)
- Buddy Collette's Swinging Shepherds (EmArcy, 1958)
- Buddy Collette Septet – Polynesia (Music & Sound, 1959)
- At the Cinema! (Mercury, 1959)
- The Polyhedric Buddy Collette (Music Records, 1961)
- Buddy Collette in Italia (Ricordi, 1961) with Basso-Valdambrini's Band
- The Soft Touch of Buddy Collette (Music Records, 1962)
- The Buddy Collette Quintet (Studio West, 1962) with Irene Kral
- The Girl from Ipenema (Crown, 1964)
- Warm Winds (World Pacific, 1964) with Charles Kynard
- Buddy Collette on Broadway (Survey, 1966)
- Now and Then (Legend, 1973)
- Block Buster (RGB, 1974)
- Flute Talk (Soul Note, 1988)
- Jazz for Thousand Oaks (UFO Bass, 1996)
- Live from the Nation's Capital (Bridge, 2000)
- Live at El Camino College (UFO Bass, 2006)

=== As sideman ===
With Harry Babasin

- The Jazzpickers (Mercury/EmArcy, 1957)

With Chet Baker

- Blood, Chet and Tears (Verve, 1970)

With Louis Bellson

- Music, Romance and Especially Love (Verve, 1957)
- Louis Bellson Swings Jule Styne (Verve, 1960)

With Brass Fever

- Brass Fever (Impulse!, 1975)
- Time Is Running Out (Impulse!, 1976)

With James Brown

- Soul on Top (King, 1969)

With Red Callender

- Swingin' Suite (Crown, 1957)
- The Lowest (MetroJazz, 1958)

With Conte Candoli

- Little Band Big Jazz (Crown, 1960)

With Benny Carter

- Aspects (United Artists, 1959)
- Additions to Further Definitions (Impulse!, 1966)

With June Christy

- Something Cool (Capitol, 1955)
- Ballads for Night People (Capitol, 1959)

With Nat King Cole

- L-O-V-E (Capitol, 1965)

With Miles Davis and Michel Legrand

- Dingo (Warner Bros., 1991)

With Sammy Davis Jr.

- The Wham of Sam (Reprise, 1961)

With Ella Fitzgerald

- Ella Fitzgerald Sings the George and Ira Gershwin Songbook (Verve, 1959)

With Gil Fuller

- Gil Fuller & the Monterey Jazz Festival Orchestra featuring Dizzy Gillespie (Pacific Jazz, 1965)

With Ted Gärdestad

- Blue Virgin Isles (Epic, 1978)

With Jimmy Giuffre

- The Jimmy Giuffre Clarinet (Atlantic, 1956)

With John Graas

- Jazzmantics (Decca, 1958)
- Coup De Graas (EmArcy, 1958)

With Chico Hamilton

- Chico Hamilton Quintet featuring Buddy Collette (Pacific Jazz, 1955)
- The Original Chico Hamilton Quintet (World Pacific, 1955 [1960])
- Chico Hamilton Quintet in Hi Fi (Pacific Jazz, 1956)
- Ellington Suite (World Pacific, 1959)
- The Three Faces of Chico (Warner Bros., 1959)

With Eddie Harris

- How Can You Live Like That? (Atlantic, 1976)

With Jon Hendricks

- ¡Salud! João Gilberto, Originator of the Bossa Nova (Reprise, 1961)

With Freddie Hubbard

- The Love Connection (Columbia, 1979)

With Quincy Jones

- Go West, Man! (ABC Paramount, 1957)

With Fred Katz

- Soul° Cello (Decca, 1958)
- Folk Songs for Far Out Folk (Warner Bros., 1958)

With Stan Kenton

- Kenton / Wagner (Capitol, 1964)

With Barney Kessel

- Easy Like (Contemporary, 1956)
- Music to Listen to Barney Kessel By (Contemporary, 1957)
- Carmen (Contemporary, 1958)

With Wade Marcus

- Metamorphosis (Impulse!, 1976)

With Les McCann

- Les McCann Sings (Pacific Jazz, 1961)

With Rod McKuen

- Beatsville (HiFi Records, 1959)

With Carmen McRae

- Carmen for Cool Ones (Decca, 1958)
- Portrait of Carmen (Atlantic, 1968)

With Charles Mingus

- The Complete Town Hall Concert (Blue Note, 1962 [1994])

With Blue Mitchell

- Bantu Village (Blue Note, 1969)

With Lyle Murphy

- Four Saxophones in Twelve Tones (GNP, 1955)

With Oliver Nelson

- Zig Zag (Original Motion Picture Score) (MGM, 1970)
- Skull Session (Flying Dutchman, 1975)
- Stolen Moments (East Wind, 1975)

With Red Norvo

- Ad Lib (Liberty, 1957)
- Music To Listen To Red Norvo By (Contemporary, 1957)

With Dory Previn

- On My Way to Where (United Artists, 1970)
- Mythical Kings and Iguanas (United Artists, 1971)
- Dory Previn (Warner Bros., 1974)

With Don Ralke

- Bongo Madness (Crown, 1957)

With Buddy Rich

- This One's for Basie (Norgran, 1956)

With Little Richard

- Mr. Big (Joy, 1965 [1971])

With Shorty Rogers

- The Fourth Dimension in Sound (Warner Bros., 1961)

With Pete Rugolo

- The Music from Richard Diamond (EmArcy, 1959)
- Behind Brigitte Bardot (Warner Bros., 1960)

With Horace Silver

- Silver 'n Wood (Blue Note, 1974)
- Silver 'n Brass (Blue Note, 1975)
- The Continuity of Spirit (Silverto, 1985)

With Frank Sinatra

- Sinatra's Swingin' Session!!! (Capitol, 1961)
- L.A. Is My Lady (Qwest, 1984)

With Gábor Szabó and Bob Thiele

- Light My Fire (Impulse!, 1967)

With The Three Sounds

- Soul Symphony (Blue Note, 1969)
- Persistent Percussion (1960, Kent, KST 500)

With Mel Tormé

- Comin' Home Baby! (Atlantic, 1962)

With Stanley Turrentine

- Everybody Come On Out (Fantasy, 1976)

With Gerald Wilson

- You Better Believe It! (Pacific Jazz, 1961)
- Lomelin (Discovery, 1981)

With Nancy Wilson

- Broadway – My Way (Capitol, 1964)
