= Chuck Gentry =

American jazz musician (1911–1988)

Charles T. Gentry (December 14, 1911, Belgrade, Nebraska – January 1, 1988, California) was an American jazz saxophonist.

Gentry learned to play clarinet while growing up in Sterling, Colorado, United States, and attended Colorado State Teachers College before moving to Los Angeles to pursue a career in music. He played with Vido Musso in 1939, then with Harry James in 1940–41; during World War II he worked with Benny Goodman, the Army band of Glenn Miller, and Artie Shaw. He then worked with Jan Savitt before returning to Goodman's employ in 1946. After 1947, he worked often as a session musician with Louis Armstrong, Georgie Auld, Charlie Barnet, Ralph Burns, Benny Carter, June Christy, Sammy Davis Jr., Ella Fitzgerald, Pete Fountain, The Four Freshmen, Erroll Garner, Woody Herman, Stan Kenton, Spud Murphy, Anita O'Day, Patti Page, Mel Powell, Della Reese, Shorty Rogers, Pete Rugolo, Mel Torme, and Nancy Wilson.

== Discography ==
=== As sideman ===
With Glen Gray

- Casa Loma in Hi-Fi (Capitol, 1956)
- Sounds of the Great Bands! (Capitol, 1958)
- Solo Spotlight (Capitol, 1960)
- Please, Mr. Gray... (Capitol, 1961)

With Skip Martin

- 8 Brass, 5 Sax, 4 Rhythm (MGM, 1959)
- Scheherajazz (Pye Golden Guinea, 1959)
- Swingin' with Prince Igor (Sonic Workshop, 1960)

With Billy May

- The Girls and Boys On Broadway (Capitol, 1960)
- Bill's Bag (Capitol, 1963)
- Sorta-May (Creative World, 1971)

With Shorty Rogers

- Manteca (RCA Victor, 1958)
- Shorty Rogers Meets Tarzan (MGM, 1959)
- The Swingin' Nutcracker (RCA Victor, 1960)

With Pete Rugolo

- Music for Hi-Fi Bugs (EmArcy, 1956)
- An Adventure in Sound Reeds in Hi-Fi (Mercury, 1957)
- Out On a Limb (EmArcy, 1957)
- Rugolo Plays Kenton (Mercury/EmArcy, 1958)
- 10 Saxophones and 2 Basses (Mercury, 1961)

With others

- Van Alexander, The Home of Happy Feet (Capitol, 1959)
- Georgie Auld, In the Land of Hi-Fi (EmArcy/Mercury, 1956)
- Heinie Beau, Moviesville Jazz (Coral, 1959)
- Benny Carter, The Benny Carter Jazz Calendar (United Artists, 1959)
- Benny Carter, Aspects (United Artists, 1959)
- June Christy, June Christy Recalls Those Kenton Days (Capitol, 1959)
- Bing Crosby, Bing & Satchmo (MGM, 1960)
- Sammy Davis Jr., The Wham of Sam (Reprise, 1961)
- Dennis Farnon, Caution! Men Swinging (RCA Victor, 1957)
- Pete Fountain, The Blues (Coral, 1959)
- Four Freshmen, Four Freshmen and Five Saxes (Capitol, 1957)
- Al Hirt, Horn a-Plenty (RCA Victor, 1962)
- Barney Kessel, Modern Jazz Performances from Bizet's Opera Carmen (Contemporary, 1959)
- Johnny Mandel, Johnny Mandel's Great Jazz Score I Want to Live! (United Artists, 1958)
- Ella Mae Morse, Barrelhouse, Boogie and the Blues (Capitol, 1955)
- Lyle Murphy, 12-Tone Compositions & Arrangements (Contemporary, 1955)
- Red Norvo, Red Plays the Blues (RCA Victor, 1958)
- Anita O'Day, Trav'lin' Light (Verve, 1961)
- Henri Rene, The Swinging '59 (Imperial, 1960)
- Jess Stacy, Tribute to Benny Goodman (Atlantic, 1956)
- Bobby Troup, Bobby Troup and His Stars of Jazz (RCA Victor, 1959)
- Franz Waxman, Crime in the Streets (Decca, 1956)

== Bibliography ==
- "Chuck Gentry". The New Grove Dictionary of Jazz. 2nd edition, ed. Barry Kernfeld.
