= The Tatum Group Masterpieces, Volume Eight =

1975 album by Art Tatum with Ben Webster

Studio album by Art Tatum
- Released: 1975
- Recorded: September 11, 1956
- Genre: Jazz
- Label: Pablo
- Producer: Norman Granz, Akira Taguchi

Art Tatum chronology
The Tatum Group Masterpieces, Volume Seven (1975)	The Tatum Group Masterpieces, Volume Eight (1975)	On the Air (1978)

The Tatum Group Masterpieces, Volume Eight is an album by pianist Art Tatum and tenor saxophonist Ben Webster, with Red Callender on double bass and Bill Douglass on drums. The 1956 session was originally released in 1958 on Verve Records album produced by Norman Granz as The Art Tatum - Ben Webster Quartet, but Granz re-acquired the masters in the 1970s after the album was allowed to go out of print. He reissued the material as one of a series of eight Group Masterpieces featuring Tatum in collaboration with other artists, also issuing it as part of a boxed set, The Complete Pablo Group Masterpieces. The album has been reissued on CD, including a January 31, 1992 version with bonus tracks.

The album was critically well-received, with critics singling out the combination of Webster's tone with Tatum's elaborate piano playing. The album is listed in several volumes as among the best in jazz and is recommended by the Music Library Association as an important piece for music libraries.

== History ==
Tatum and Webster were established figures in their 40s when they assembled for this album on September 11, 1956. According to Ben Ratliff in Jazz: A Critic's Guide to the 100 Most Important Recordings, Tatum was known for virtuoso solo performance, while Webster had mellowed from his days with Duke Ellington. Despite their differences, they were a good match. According to Benny Green in the liner notes, this was because of Webster's tone and professionalism. Critic Scott Yanow agrees that "the combination works very well".

This was among the last recordings by Tatum, who died on November 5 of that year. The session was released in 1958 on an LP produced by Norman Granz for Verve Records under the title Art Tatum – Ben Webster Quartet.

By 1971, Granz had attempted to gain access to this and his other out-of-print collaborations with Art Tatum from Verve, even offering to buy the masters. He acquired the rights after the 1973 formation of his own label, Pablo Records, and reissued those albums in 1975 under The Tatum Group Masterpieces and The Tatum Solo Masterpieces as individual albums and as two boxed sets. One track from the session, "All the Things You Are", was later included in the 12-track CD The Best of the Pablo Group Masterpieces. The album was reissued on January 31, 1992 with bonus tracks.

== Critical response ==
Professional ratings
Review scores
Source	Rating
Allmusic	4.5/5 stars
Encyclopedia of Popular Music	5/5 stars
The Penguin Guide to Jazz Recordings	4/4 stars

The album was critically well received. In a 1994 review, The Hartford Courant described it as "delectable", with "Webster's big, breathy tone" wrapping "Tatum's arabesques in a warm, loving embrace." The Washington Post characterized it as "[a] great way to introduce two of the greats."

The album is included in several books on the top albums in jazz, including Jazz: A Critic's Guide to the 100 Most Important Recordings, where it is listed at No. 42, and in The 101 Best Jazz Albums, where author Leonard Lyons calls volume 8 the "most exciting" among the Group Masterpieces collection. The Penguin Guide to Jazz Recordings included the album in its suggested “core collection” of essential recordings.

With volumes one and seven of the Group Masterpieces, it is recommended for inclusion in medium-sized or larger public libraries and all academic libraries by the Music Library Association in A Basic Music Library: Essential Scores and Sound Recordings.

== Track listing ==
1. "Gone With the Wind" (Herb Magidson, Allie Wrubel) – 4:48
2. "All the Things You Are" (Oscar Hammerstein II, Jerome Kern) – 7:15
3. "Have You Met Miss Jones?" (Richard Rodgers, Lorenz Hart) – 4:49
4. "My One and Only Love" (Robert Mellin, Guy Wood) – 6:15
5. "Night and Day" (Cole Porter) – 5:31
6. "My Ideal" (Newell Chase, Leo Robin, Richard A. Whiting) – 7:18
7. "Where or When" (Rodgers, Hart) – 6:28

=== Bonus tracks ===
1. "Gone With the Wind" (alternate take 1) (Magidson, Wrubel) – 4:53
2. "Gone With the Wind" (alternate take 2) (Magidson, Wrubel) – 4:51
3. "Have You Met Miss Jones?" (alternate take) (Rodgers, Hart) – 5:02

== Personnel ==
=== Musicians ===
- Art Tatum – piano
- Ben Webster – tenor saxophone
- Red Callender – double bass
- Bill Douglass – drums

=== Production ===
- Phil DeLancie – audio mastering
- Peter Grant – design
- Sam Gay – creative direction
- Norman Granz – record producer
- Benny Green – liner notes
- Phil Stern – photography
- Akira Taguchi – production
- Val Valentin – audio engineering
- Alan Yoshida – mastering
