= Phil Moore (jazz musician) =

American jazz pianist and bandleader (1918–1987)

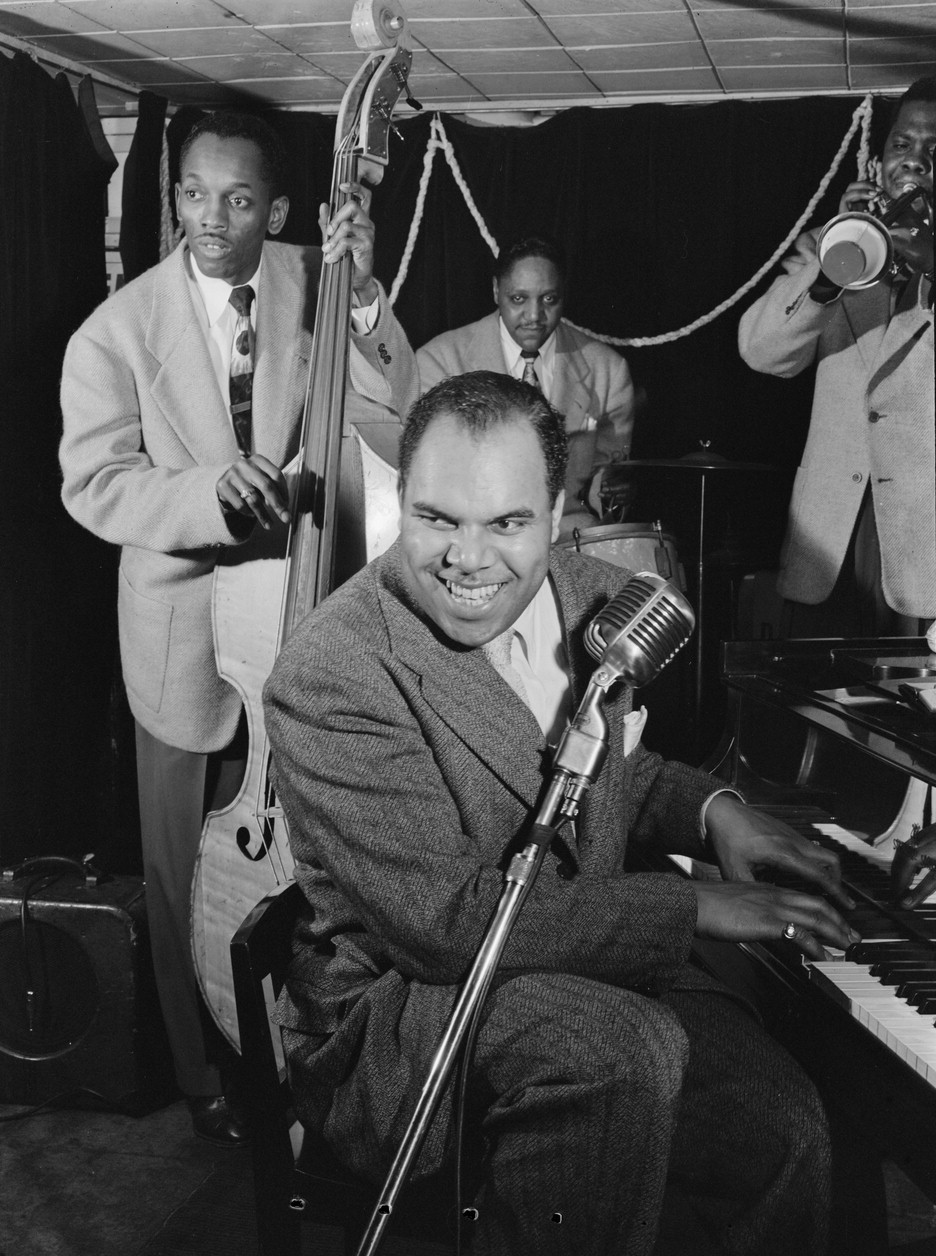
- Phil Moore and John O. Levy, c. 1947

Background information
- Born: February 20, 1918; Portland, Oregon, U.S.
- Died: May 13, 1987 (aged 69) Los Angeles, Calilfornia
- Genres: Jazz, swing
- Occupation: Musician
- Instrument: Piano

Phil Moore (February 20, 1918 – May 13, 1987) was an American jazz pianist, arranger, and bandleader.

== Biography ==
Moore was orphaned and placed in a county hospital in Portland, Oregon. When Moore was 13, he played piano at speakeasies and small venues in Portland. He attended the Cornish School and the University of Washington in Seattle.

In 1937, Moore married pianist, actress and vocalist Neva Mary Peoples of San Francisco. He supported Lena Horne, Frank Sinatra, Bobby Short, Marshal Royal, Irving Ashby, Julie Wilson, Gene Sedric, Les Hite, and Helen Gallagher. He arranged big band music for the Tommy Dorsey and Harry James orchestras.

Moore played a band leader in a short B movie, Stars on Parade (1946). About this time, his relationship with Dorothy Dandridge helped her develop a successful nightclub singing career. Moore served as vocal coach for other performers in Hollywood, including Marilyn Monroe and Ava Gardner.

Moore was an arranger for MGM and Paramount studios. He worked on scores for over 30 films including Ziegfeld Girl, Dumbo, Three Cheers for the Boys, Panama Hattie, Presenting Lily Mars, Cabin in the Sky, Kismet (1944), and This Gun for Hire. Despite his efforts, he rarely received screen credit (possibly due to racial prejudice).

During the late 1940s, Moore toured with his group, the Phil Moore Four: Milt Hinton (b), Marty Wilson (dr), Johnny Letman (tpt), and Jimmy Lyons (alto sax or gtr). He recorded for RCA Victor [with Doles Dickens (b), Walter Bishop (dr), Edward Leroy Gibbs (gtr), and Remo Palmieri (elec. gtr)]; Musicraft [w/Doles Dickens or John Levy (b), Walter Bishop Sr. (dr), an unknown guitarist, and Johnny Letman (tpt)]; and Black & White Records [w/Billy Hadnott (b), Lee Young (dr), and Irving Ashby (elec. gtr)] during this time.

Moore was a movie industry vocal and stagecraft grooming coach in many actors' early careers, notably Dorothy Dandridge and Marilyn Monroe. From the late 1950s he gained and maintained until his death a wide commercial reputation in grooming and coaching aspiring black and white singers, starting a school in New York named "For Singers Only."

In 1953, he recorded two bebop Christmas songs for RCA Victor — "Blink Before Christmas" and "Chinchy Old Scrooge". These songs, created in the heyday of the "beat" era, were thick with 1950s hipster slang in the style of jazz-based pre-rap. The recording has become a rare collector's item.

Moore died at age 69 on May 13, 1987, in Los Angeles, California.

== Discography ==
=== As leader ===
- Dance and Dream with Phil Moore at the Piano, Volume 1 (Black & White, 1946) – 78 rpm 4-disc album set.
- Eventide: Phil Moore Orchestra (Discovery, 1949) – 10-inch LP.
- Reminiscing: Phil Moore at the Piano (Discovery, 1949) – 10-inch LP.
- Music for Moderns (Clef, recorded 1947, released 195?)
- Fantasy for Girl and Orchestra (Verve, recorded 1947, released 1956)
- Portrait of Leda [w/Leda Annest] (Columbia, 1958)
- Polynesian Paradise (Strand, 1959)
- Moore's Tour: An American in England (MGM, 1959)
- New York Sweet (Mercury, 1963)

=== As sideman ===
With Gil Fuller

- Gil Fuller & the Monterey Jazz Festival Orchestra featuring Dizzy Gillespie (Pacific Jazz #PJ-93, 1965)
