= Nate Kazebier =

American jazz musician

Nate Kazebier (August 13, 1912 – October 22, 1969) was an American jazz trumpeter.

Kazebier started on trumpet at age nine. His early experience was in territory bands in the Midwest, with Austin Wylie, Jan Garber, and Slats Randall. In 1935–36 he played in Benny Goodman's band, then moved to California, where he played with Ray Noble, Seger Ellis, Spud Murphy, and others. In 1939–40 he was a member of Gene Krupa's first big band, then worked with Jimmy Dorsey from 1940–1943. He spent time in the military during World War II, then returned to play with Goodman in 1946–47. From the late 1940s into the 1960s, he worked in the studios in California, playing with Ray Bauduc among many others. He never led his own recording date. During the big band era he was just a membrer of the trumpet section and never recorded a solo in these bands that is verified. He did, however, play together with Gene Krupa and his Chicagoans in a small band studio-session for Decca (Decca Recordings 18… series) on 19 November 1935 - there he was the sole trumpeter on four tunes.
