= Jazz Loves Paris =

Studio album by Buddy Collette
- Released: 1960
- Recorded: January 24, 1958
- Studio: Radio Recorders, Hollywood, California
- Genre: Jazz
- Length: 43:00 CD reissue with bonus tracks
- Label: Specialty SPC 5002

Buddy Collette chronology
Flute Fraternity (1957)	Jazz Loves Paris (1960)	Buddy Collette's Swinging Shepherds (1958)

Jazz Loves Paris is an album by multi-instrumentalist and composer Buddy Collette recorded in early 1958 and released on the Specialty label in 1960.

== Reception ==
Professional ratings
Review scores
Source	Rating
Allmusic	2.5/5 stars
The Penguin Guide to Jazz Recordings	2.5/4 stars

The Allmusic review by Scott Yanow states: "Such melodies as "I Love Paris," "La Vie En Rose," "C'est Si Bon" and the "Song from 'Moulin Rouge" are given concise but swinging treatment on this likable date".

== Track listing ==
1. "I Love Paris" (Cole Porter) - 2:21
2. "Pigalle" (Georges Konyn, Charles Newman, Georges Ulmer) - 2:29
3. "La Vie en Rose" (Édith Piaf, Louiguy) - 3:56
4. "Darling, Je Vous Aime Beaucoup" (Anna Sosenko) - 2:45
5. "Mam'selle" (Edmund Goulding, Mack Gordon) - 1:17
6. "C'est si bon" (Henri Betti, André Hornez, Jerry Seelen) - 3:04
7. "Domino" (Louis Ferrari, Jacques Plante) - 2:16
8. "The Song from Moulin Rouge" (Georges Auric, William Engvick) - 2:33
9. "The Last Time I Saw Paris" (Jerome Kern, Oscar Hammerstein II) - 4:37
10. "Under Paris Skies" (Jean Dréjac, Hubert Giraud) - 2:29
11. "Darling, Je Vous Aime Beaucoup" [alternate take] (Sosenko) - 3:27 Bonus track on CD reissue
12. "Mam'selle" [alternate take] (Goulding, Gordon) - 1:22 Bonus track on CD reissue
13. "The Last Time I Saw Paris" [alternate take] (Kern, Hammerstein) - 4:39 Bonus track on CD reissue
14. "La Vie en Rose" [alternate take] (Piaf, Louiguy) - 3:34 Bonus track on CD reissue

== Personnel ==
- Buddy Collette - alto saxophone, tenor saxophone, flute, clarinet
- Frank Rosolino - trombone
- Howard Roberts - guitar
- Red Mitchell - bass
- Red Callender - tuba, bass
- Bill Douglass (tracks 1, 4, 5, 8, 9 & 11- 13), Bill Richmond (tracks 2, 3, 6, 7, 10 & 14) - drums
