= The Lowest =

Studio album by Red Callender
- Released: 1958
- Recorded: April 30 and May 1, 1958
- Studio: Hollywood, CA
- Genre: Jazz
- Label: MetroJazz; E 1007
- Producer: Leonard Feather

Red Callender chronology
Callender Speaks Low (1957)	The Lowest (1958)	Basin Street Brass (1973)

The Lowest is an album by bassist and tubist Red Callender, recorded for the MetroJazz label in 1958.

== Reception ==
Professional ratings
Review scores
Source	Rating
Allmusic	4/5 stars

The Allmusic review by Ken Dryden states: "These sessions feature quite a few of the rising stars of the West Coast jazz scene... As a bassist, Callender was very much in demand and displays his immense talent in a rather subdued way. He sets aside his bass to play tuba on several tracks, proving himself as a convincing soloist on an instrument almost always relegated to rhythm, in addition to being out of favor once the bass came into jazz ensembles".

== Track listing ==
All compositions by Red Callender except where noted

1. "Autumn in New York" (Vernon Duke)
2. "Pickin, Pluckin, Whistlin' and Walkin'"
3. "The Lowest"
4. "Of Thee I Sing" (George Gershwin, Ira Gershwin)
5. "Dedicated to the Blues"
6. "They Can't Take That Away from Me" (Gershwin, Gershwin)
7. "Five-Four Blues" (Josef Myrow)
8. "Tea For Two" (Vincent Youmans, Irving Caesar)
9. "Another Blues"
10. "Volume, Too"
11. "I'll Be Around" (Alec Wilder)

== Personnel ==
- Red Callender - bass (tracks 2, 4 & 6–10), tuba (tracks 1, 3, 5 & 11)
- Gerald Wilson – trumpet (tracks 1, 3, 5-7 & 9–11)
- John Ewing − trombone (tracks 6, 9 & 10)
- Hymie Gunkler − alto saxophone (tracks 6, 9 & 10)
- Buddy Collette − tenor saxophone (tracks 6, 9 & 10), flute (tracks 1, 3–5, 7, 8 & 11), piccolo (track 2)
- Martin Berman − baritone saxophone (tracks 6, 9 & 10)
- Eddie Beal (tracks 6, 9 & 10), Gerald Wiggins (tracks 1, 3, 5, 7 & 11) − piano
- Bill Pitman (tracks 2, 4 & 8), Billy Bean (tracks 1, 3, 5, 7 & 11) − guitar
- Red Mitchell − bass (tracks 1, 3, 5 & 11)
- Bill Douglass – drums
