= Buddy Collette's Swinging Shepherds =

Studio album by Buddy Collette
- Released: 1958
- Recorded: March 5 & 7, 1958; Master Recorders in Hollywood, CA
- Genre: Jazz
- Label: EmArcy MG 36133 / SR 80005
- Producer: Pete Rugolo

Buddy Collette chronology
Jazz Loves Paris (1958)	Buddy Collette's Swinging Shepherds (1958)	At the Cinema! (1958)

Buddy Collette's Swinging Shepherds is an album by multi-instrumentalist and composer Buddy Collette recorded at sessions in 1958 and released on the EmArcy label. The group features a front line of four flautists.

== Reception ==
Professional ratings
Review scores
Source	Rating
AllMusic	3/5 stars

AllMusic rated the album with 3 stars.

== Track listing ==
All compositions by Buddy Collette except as indicated

1. "Pony Tale" (Paul Horn) - 2:28
2. "Machito" (Pete Rugolo) - 3:25
3. "Short Story" - 3:54
4. "Flute Diet" - 4:33
5. "Improvisation (With Conga)" (Rugolo, Bud Shank, Collette, Horn, Harry Klee) - 4:45
6. "The Funky Shepherds" (Shank) - 4:53
7. "Tasty Dish" - 4:23
8. "Improvisation (Unaccompanied)" (Rugolo, Shank, Collette, Horn, Klee) - 2:14
9. "The Four Winds Blow" (Horn) - 3:37
- Recorded at Master Recorders in Hollywood on March 5 (tracks 1–4) and March 7 (tracks 5–9), 1958

== Personnel ==
- Buddy Collette, Paul Horn, Harry Klee, Bud Shank - flute, piccolo
- Bill Miller - piano
- Joe Comfort - bass
- Bill Richmond - drums, congas
- Pete Rugolo - arranger
