= Cool, Calm & Collette =

Calm, Cool & Collette

Studio album by Buddy Collette
- Released: 1957
- Recorded: January 24, 1957; ABC Studios
- Genre: Jazz
- Label: ABC Paramount ABC-179

Buddy Collette chronology
Nice Day with Buddy Collette (1957)	Calm, Cool & Collette (1957)	Everybody's Buddy (1957)

Calm, Cool & Collette is an album by multi-instrumentalist and composer Buddy Collette recorded at sessions in early 1957 and released on the ABC Paramount label.

== Reception ==
Professional ratings
Review scores
Source	Rating
Allmusic	3/5 stars

The Allmusic site rated the album with 3 stars.

== Track listing ==
All compositions by Buddy Collette except as indicated

1. "Winston Walks" (John Goodman) - 2:54
2. "If She Had Stayed" (Dick Shreve) - 3:32
3. "They Can't Take That Away from Me" (George Gershwin, Ira Gershwin) - 3:45
4. "Undecided" (Charlie Shavers, Sid Robin) - 3:10
5. "Flute in "D"" - 4:47
6. "The Continental" (Con Conrad, Herb Magidson) - 3:05
7. "Three and One" - 3:30
8. "Night in Tunisia" (Dizzy Gillespie, Frank Paparelli) - 4:07
9. "Johnny Walks" - 6:20
10. "Perfidia" (Alberto Domínguez) - 2:54
11. "Morning Jazz" (Shreve) - 3:41

== Personnel ==
- Buddy Collette - tenor saxophone, alto saxophone, flute, clarinet
- Dick Shreve - piano
- John Goodman - bass
- Bill Dolney - drums
