= Nice Day with Buddy Collette =

Studio album by Buddy Collette
- Released: 1957
- Recorded: November 6 & 29, 1956 and February 18, 1957; Contemporary Records Studio, Los Angeles, California
- Genre: Jazz
- Length: 38:29
- Label: Contemporary C3531
- Producer: Lester Koenig

Buddy Collette chronology
Man of Many Parts (1956)	Nice Day with Buddy Collette (1957)	Cool, Calm & Collette (1957)

Nice Day with Buddy Collette is the second album by multi-instrumentalist and composer Buddy Collette, recorded at sessions in late 1956 and early 1957 and released on the Contemporary label.

== Reception ==
Professional ratings
Review scores
Source	Rating
Allmusic	4/5 stars
Disc	4/5 stars
The Penguin Guide to Jazz Recordings	3/4 stars

The Allmusic review by Scott Yanow states: "Overall this set serves as a good all-around showcase for Buddy Collette's playing and writing talents".

== Track listing ==
All compositions by Buddy Collette except as indicated

1. "Nice Day" - 4:19
2. "There Will Never Be Another You" (Harry Warren, Mack Gordon) - 4:26
3. "Minor Deviation" (Dick Shreve) - 4:42
4. "Over the Rainbow" (Harold Arlen, Yip Harburg) - 5:15
5. "Change It" - 3:19
6. "Moten Swing" (Bennie Moten, Buster Moten) - 3:26
7. "I'll Remember April" (Gene de Paul, Patricia Johnston, Don Raye) - 3:09
8. "Blues for Howard" - 4:03
9. "Fall Winds" - 6:28
10. "Buddy Boo" - 4:31
- Recorded at Contemporary's studio in Los Angeles on November 6, 1956 (tracks 1 & 4), November 29, 1956 (tracks 3, 5 & 7–9) and February 18, 1957 (tracks 2, 6 & 10).

== Personnel ==
- Buddy Collette - tenor saxophone, alto saxophone, flute, clarinet
- Don Friedman (tracks 1 & 4), Calvin Jackson (tracks 2, 6 & 10), Dick Shreve (tracks 3, 5 & 7–9) - piano
- John Goodman (tracks 1, 3–5 & 7–9), Leroy Vinnegar (tracks 2, 6 & 10) - bass
- Bill Dolney (tracks 3, 5 & 7–9), Shelly Manne (tracks 2, 6 & 10), Joe Peters (tracks 1 & 4) - drums
