= Man of Many Parts =

Studio album by Buddy Collette
- Released: 1957
- Recorded: August 6, October 15 and December 4, 1956
- Studio: Contemporary Records Studio, Los Angeles, California
- Genre: Jazz
- Length: 40:53
- Label: Contemporary C3522
- Producer: Lester Koenig

Buddy Collette chronology
Tanganyika (1956)	Man of Many Parts (1957)	Nice Day with Buddy Collette (1957)

Man of Many Parts is an album by multi-instrumentalist and composer Buddy Collette recorded at sessions in 1956 and released on the Contemporary label.

== Reception ==
Professional ratings
Review scores
Source	Rating
Allmusic	4.5/5 stars
Disc	4/5 stars
The Penguin Guide to Jazz Recordings	2.5/4 stars

The Allmusic review by Scott Yanow states: "Collette is showcased on tenor, alto, clarinet, and his strongest ax, flute. He also contributed nine of the dozen selections".

== Track listing ==
All compositions by Buddy Collette except where noted.

1. "Cycle" - 2:51
2. "Makin' Whoopee" (Gus Kahn, Walter Donaldson) - 3:36
3. "Ruby" (Heinz Eric Roemheld, Mitchell Parish) - 2:48
4. "St. Andrews Place Blues" - 3:42
5. "Cheryl Ann" - 4:35
6. "Sunset Drive" - 3:20
7. "Jazz City Blues" - 4:43
8. "Slappy's Tune" - 3:39
9. "Frenesí" (Alberto Dominguez) - 2:42
10. "Santa Monica" - 3:43
11. "Jungle Pipe" - 4:02
12. "Zan" - 3:20
- Recorded at Contemporary's studio in Los Angeles on February 13, 1956 (tracks 1, 3, 8 & 10), February 24, 1956 (tracks 2, 6, 7 & 9) and April 17, 1956 (tracks 4, 5, 11 & 12).

== Personnel ==
- Buddy Collette - tenor saxophone, alto saxophone, flute, clarinet
- Gerald Wilson - trumpet (tracks 1, 3, 8 & 10)
- David Wells - bass trumpet (tracks 1, 3, 8 & 10)
- William E. Green - alto saxophone (tracks 1, 3, 8 & 10)
- Jewell Grant - baritone saxophone (tracks 1, 3, 8 & 10)
- Barney Kessel - guitar (tracks 4, 5, 11 & 12)
- Ernie Freeman (tracks 1, 3–5, 8 & 1–12), Gerald Wiggins (tracks 1, 3, 8 & 10) - piano
- Red Callender (tracks 1, 3, 8 & 10), Joe Comfort (tracks 4, 5, 11 & 12), Gene Wright (tracks 2, 6, 7 & 9) - bass
- Max Albright (tracks 1, 3, 8 & 10), Larry Bunker (tracks 2, 6, 7 & 9), Bill Richmond (tracks 4, 5, 11 & 12) - drums
