= The Wham of Sam =

Studio album by Sammy Davis Jr.
- Released: 1961
- Recorded: February 6–7, 1961
- Genre: Vocal jazz
- Length: 37:35
- Label: Reprise
- Producer: Jimmy Bowen

Sammy Davis Jr. chronology
Mr. Entertainment (1961)	The Wham of Sam (1961)	Sammy Davis Jr. Belts the Best of Broadway (1962)

The Wham of Sam is a 1961 studio album by Sammy Davis Jr., arranged by Marty Paich and Morty Stevens.

== Reception ==
Professional ratings
Review scores
Source	Rating
Allmusic	4/5 stars
New Record Mirror	5/5

The Allmusic review by Lindsay Planer awarded the album four stars and said that Davis' "untouchable sense of rhythmic flair unleashes some lighthearted interaction between the vocalist and hard-driving instrumentalists.".

== Track listing ==
1. "I'm a Fool to Want You" (Joel Herron, Frank Sinatra, Jack Wolf) – 3:28
2. "Back in Your Own Backyard" (Dave Dreyer, Al Jolson, Billy Rose) – 2:49
3. "Lush Life" (Billy Strayhorn) – 3:45
4. "I'm Gonna Live Till I Die" (Mann Curtis, Al Hoffman, Walter Kent) – 3:09
5. "(Love Is) The Tender Trap" (Jimmy Van Heusen, Sammy Cahn) – 2:35
6. "Out of This World" (Harold Arlen, Johnny Mercer) – 3:19
7. "Bye Bye Blackbird" (Mort Dixon, Ray Henderson) – 2:47
8. "Thou Swell" (Richard Rodgers, Lorenz Hart) – 2:59
9. "Can't We Be Friends?" (Paul James, Kay Swift) – 2:53
10. "Blame it on My Youth" (Edward Heyman, Oscar Levant) – 4:14
11. "Let There Be Love" (Ian Grant, Lionel Rand) – 2:49
12. "Soon" (George Gershwin, Ira Gershwin) – 2:48

== Personnel ==
- Sammy Davis Jr. – vocals
- Marty Paich and his orchestra – arranger, conductor (tracks 7–12)
- Morty Stevens and his orchestra – arranger, conductor (tracks 1–6)
- Jimmy Mitchell – double bass
- Joe Mondragon
- Armand Kaproff – cello
- Raphael Kramer
- Edgar Lustgarten
- Kurt Reher
- Mel Lewis – drums
- Shelly Manne
- Vincent DeRosa – french horn
- Tony Rizzi – guitar
- Larry Bunker – percussion
- Jimmy Rowles – piano
- Ronnie Lang – alto saxophone
- Bud Shank
- Bill Hood – baritone saxophone
- Buddy Collette – tenor saxophone
- Dave Pell
- Bill Perkins
- Frank Howard – trombone
- Dick Nash
- Dick Noel
- Kenny Shroyer
- Lloyd Ulyate
- Stu Williamson
- Frank Beach – trumpet
- Don Fagerquist
- Ollie Mitchell
- Al Porcino
- Uan Rasey
- Jack Sheldon
- Red Callender – tuba
- Sam Freed – violin
- Anatol Kaminsky
- Erno Neufeld
- Lou Raderman
