= Bill Douglass =

American drummer (1923–1994)

- Born: February 28, 1923; Sherman, Texas, United States
- Died: December 19, 1994 (aged 71)
- Genres: Jazz
- Occupation: Musician
- Instrument: Drums
- Formerly of: June Christy, Benny Goodman, Lena Horne, Ben Webster

William Douglass (February 28, 1923 – December 19, 1994) was an American jazz drummer born in Sherman, Texas. Douglass relocated to Los Angeles when he was six months old, becoming in his adulthood a popular Los Angeles musician who worked shows and sessions. Douglass provided drums for notable instrumentalists such as Benny Goodman and Ben Webster, as well as providing backing for vocalists such as Lena Horne and June Christy. He was also known for his work in the American Federation of Musicians, where he was an active proponent of desegregation. He held offices in local unions both before and after their racial integration.

== Early childhood ==
Six months after Douglass was born in Sherman, Texas, his extended family relocated to Los Angeles in an effort to escape Jim Crow laws. A member of a musical family, Douglass took an early interest in music. He cited as a pivotal moment in his life when he first heard Benny Goodman's drummer Gene Krupa performing "Sing, Sing, Sing" on the radio, when he realized, "That's what I had to do. That's all there was to it." Douglass met and befriended Dexter Gordon while attending McKinley Junior High School in Los Angeles, at which point he first began playing drums. At Jefferson High School, both Douglass and Gordon began taking band under teacher Lloyd Reese, who encouraged the rudiments and private instruction. Though a drummer, Douglass took private keyboard instructions, which he credited with helping him to understand how the various instruments in an ensemble relate. Douglass never took private drum lessons, but eventually made the acquaintance of Cab Calloway drummer Cozy Cole, who used to allow Douglass to watch him practice. Douglass learned a lot watching Cole and other drummers, who gradually helped him evolve a style of his own.

Along with Gordon and Lammar Wright, Jr., Douglass began playing night clubs while still in school and frequently haunted Central Avenue, an important nexus of African-American jazz music at the time. Douglass eventually began playing drums for pianist Gerald Wiggins, along with double bass and tuba player Red Callender, until he and Callender left to form a trio with blind pianist Art Tatum.

== Military service ==
In 1941, Douglass graduated high school. He enlisted in the United States Army and was assigned to the African-American 10th Cavalry Regiment at Camp Lockett in Campo, California, where he served along with his high-school band teacher as a member of the band. Fifteen months after enlisting, he was shipped overseas, serving in such diverse locations as Casablanca, Oran, Algiers, Naples and Rome. During these travels, Douglass became drum major of his 28-piece ensemble, a position he attributed to his "great height".

== Music and political career ==
After leaving the service, in about 1949, Douglass began a three-year stint with Benny Goodman, where he was at the time the only black member of the band. During that period, Goodman often complained of the need to deal with a separate local chapter of the American Federation of Musicians for Douglass, as the chapters of the union were segregated. Lloyd Reese encouraged Douglass, along with fellow musicians Buddy Collette, Charles Mingus and Chico Hamilton, to work against the discrimination in the unions, which they did along with Marl Young and Benny Carter. Not allowed to voice opinions at their local union from the floor, the group ran for office, succeeding well enough to take the majority position on the board of directors, though only Douglass took a high position, the vice presidency. At the same time, white members of the American Federation of Musicians were applying pressure within their local. In spite of significant opposition, a majority vote of both of the unions eventually led to their joining into one in 1953.

The amalgamation of the unions was not without some difficulty. Horace Tapscott, who was a 15-year-old member of the union at the time and remembered Douglass as among the "vanguard of the movement," indicated in his 2001 autobiography that after the amalgamation, the union was separated by cliques, where a "particular, small, black group of guys would work all the time, because they were in that particular clique with these particular guys who ran the studios." Though he said that the work seemed to get better "for certain people", he also said that many of the older musicians "didn't have anyplace to go" after the closing of the black union.

== Music education ==
Even as a working musician, Douglass expanded into teaching drums at Drum City. Among his students, Douglass taught Ray Brown, Jr. (the adopted son of bassist Ray Brown), Karen Carpenter, and Ella Fitzgerald.

== Select discography ==
- The Gerald Wiggins Trio, Gerald Wiggins, 1953.
- Cal Tjader Quartet, Cal Tjader (Fantasy, 1956)
- The Gerald Wiggins Trio, The King and I, 1957.
- Red Callender, The Lowest (MetroJazz, 1958)
- Buddy Collette, Jazz Loves Paris (Speciality, 1958)
- The Tatum Group Masterpieces, Volume Seven, Art Tatum with Buddy DeFranco, 1975.
- The Art Tatum - Ben Webster Quartet, Art Tatum with Ben Webster (Verve, 1956 [1958])
- Honor Thy Fatha, Earl Hines, 1978.
- The Complete Aladdin Recordings of Amos Milburn, Amos Milburn, 1994.
- Naturally, The Red Norvo Quintet, 2005.
