= Flute Fraternity =

Studio album by Herbie Mann and Buddy Collette
- Released: 1957
- Recorded: July 1957; Hollywood, California
- Genre: Jazz
- Length: 32:15
- Label: Mode MOD-LP 114

Buddy Collette chronology
Porgy & Bess (1957)	Flute Fraternity (1957)	Jazz Loves Paris (1958)

Herbie Mann chronology
Great Ideas of Western Mann (1957)	Flute Fraternity (1957)	The Magic Flute of Herbie Mann (1957)

Flute Fraternity (also released as Hi-Flutin') is an album by multi-instrumentalists Herbie Mann and Buddy Collette recorded at sessions in 1957 and released on the Mode label.

== Reception ==
Professional ratings
Review scores
Source	Rating
Allmusic	3/5 stars
The Penguin Guide to Jazz Recordings	3/4 stars

The Allmusic review by Scott Yanow states: "The most interesting aspect to this lightly swinging music is the constant switching around of the lead voices on their various horns", although The Penguin Guide to Jazz Recordings criticises the album for the number of different combinations of instruments used.

== Track listing ==
All compositions by Herbie Mann except where noted.

1. "Herbie's Buddy" - 4:08
2. "Perdido" (Juan Tizol, Ervin Drake, Hans Lengsfelder) - 4:13
3. "Baubles, Bangles, & Beads" (Robert Wright, George Forrest) - 4:20
4. "Give a Little Whistle" (Leigh Harline, Ned Washington) - 3:35
5. "Here's Pete" (Pete Rugolo) - 2:40
6. "Theme from "Theme From"" - 6:44
7. "Nancy (with the Laughing Face)" (Jimmy Van Heusen, Phil Silvers) - 3:57
8. "Morning After" - 2:38

== Personnel ==
- Herbie Mann - flute, alto flute, clarinet, tenor saxophone
- Buddy Collette - flute, alto flute, clarinet, alto saxophone, tenor saxophone
- Jimmy Rowles - piano, celesta
- Buddy Clark - bass
- Mel Lewis - drums
