= Hollywood – My Way =

Studio album by Nancy Wilson
- Released: July 1963
- Recorded: 1963
- Genre: Vocal jazz
- Label: Capitol
- Producer: Tom Morgan

Nancy Wilson chronology
Broadway – My Way (1963)	Hollywood – My Way (1963)	Yesterday's Love Songs/Today's Blues (1964)

Professional ratings
Review scores
Source	Rating
Allmusic	3/5 stars

Hollywood – My Way is a studio album by Nancy Wilson issued in July 1963 on Capitol Records. The album rose to No. 11 on the Billboard 200 chart.

== Critical reception ==
Stephen Cook of Allmusic with praise wrote, "Like one of her biggest selling albums, Yesterday's Love Songs/Tomorrow's Blues, Hollywood My Way is filled with strong material, fine arrangements, and more than enough evidence of Nancy Wilson's considerable and elegant vocal talents...this collection of movie songs ranging from 1931's "When Did You Leave Heaven" to 1962's "Days of Wine and Roses" (with Jimmy Jones' stellar arrangements) is one of Wilson's best. As usual, she deftly works through a variety of tempi with aplomb."

== Track listing ==
1. "My Shining Hour" (Harold Arlen, Johnny Mercer) – 1:58
2. "Days of Wine and Roses" (Henry Mancini, Mercer) – 3:27
3. "Moon River" (Mancini, Mercer) – 2:07
4. "Secret Love" (Sammy Fain, Paul Francis Webster) – 3:04
5. "Dearly Beloved" (Jerome Kern, Mercer) – 2:13
6. "I'll Never Stop Loving You" (Nicholas Brodszky, Sammy Cahn) – 2:39
7. "When Did You Leave Heaven" (Walter Bullock, Richard A. Whiting) – 2:55
8. "Almost in Your Arms (Love Song from Houseboat)" (Ray Evans, Jay Livingston) – 2:31
9. "Wild Is the Wind" (Dimitri Tiomkin, Ned Washington) – 2:50
10. "The Second Time Around" (Cahn, Jimmy Van Heusen) – 2:53
11. "Did I Remember" (Harold Adamson, Walter Donaldson) – 3:44
12. "You'd Be So Nice to Come Home To" (Cole Porter) – 2:36

Bonus tracks on 2006 reissue

1. "Alfie" (Burt Bacharach, Hal David) – 3:04
2. "The Look of Love" (Bacharach, David) – 2:26
3. "More" (Riz Ortolani, Nino Oliviero, Marcello Ciorciolini, Norman Newell) – 3:14
4. "The Shadow of Your Smile (Love Theme from The Sandpiper)" (Johnny Mandel, Webster) – 2:01
5. "Watch What Happens" (Jacques Demy, Norman Gimbel, Michel Legrand) – 3:04

== Personnel ==
- Nancy Wilson – vocals
- Jimmy Jones – piano, arrangements, conductor
- Clark Terry – trumpet
