= The Magic Flute of Herbie Mann =

Studio album by Herbie Mann
- Released: 1957
- Recorded: August 1957; Los Angeles, California
- Genre: Jazz
- Label: Verve; MGV 8247
- Producer: Norman Granz

Herbie Mann chronology
Flute Fraternity (1957)	The Magic Flute of Herbie Mann (1957)	Just Wailin' (1958)

The Magic Flute of Herbie Mann is an album by American jazz flautist Herbie Mann recorded in 1957 for the Verve label.

== Reception ==
Professional ratings
Review scores
Source	Rating
AllMusic	3/5 stars

Allmusic awarded the album 3 stars.

== Track listing ==
1. "Evolution of Man(n)" (Herbie Mann) - 4:07
2. "Moonlight Serenade" (Glenn Miller, Mitchell Parish) - 2:55
3. "St. Louis Blues" (W. C. Handy) - 3:59
4. "Baia" (Ary Barroso, Ray Gilbert) - 2:49
5. "Body and Soul" (Frank Eyton, Johnny Green, Edward Heyman, Robert Sour) - 2:57
6. "Let's Dance" (Fannie Baldridge, Joseph Bonine, Gregory Stone) - 2:24
7. "Frenesí" (Alberto Domínguez, Leonard Whitcup) - 2:27
8. "Oodles of Noodles" (Jimmy Dorsey) - 2:58
9. "Tenderly" (Walter Gross, Jack Lawrence) - 4:02
10. "Peanut Vendor" (Moisés Simons) - 2:03
11. "Stardust" (Hoagy Carmichael, Mitchell Parish) - 2:56
12. "Strike Up the Band" (George Gershwin, Ira Gershwin) - 2:04

== Personnel ==
- Herbie Mann - flute
- Jimmy Rowles - piano (tracks 2, 3, 5, 6, 8, 9, 11 & 12)
- Laurindo Almeida (tracks 1, 4, 7 & 10), Tony Rizzi (tracks 1, 4, 7 & 10), Howard Roberts (tracks 2, 5, 8 & 11) - guitar
- Buddy Clark (tracks 2, 3, 5, 6, 8, 9, 11 & 12), Tony Reyes (tracks 1, 4, 7 & 10) - bass
- Milt Holland (tracks 1, 4, 7 & 10), Mel Lewis (tracks 2, 3, 5, 6, 8, 9, 11 & 12) - drums
- Frank "Chico" Guerrero - congas (tracks 1, 4, 7 & 10)
- Unidentified string section directed by Frank De Vol (tracks 2, 5, 8 & 11)
