= Austin Wylie =

American jazz bandleader (1893–1947)

- Birth name: Austin James Wylie
- Born: 1893; Cleveland, Ohio, U.S.
- Died: December 7, 1947 (aged 54); Parma, Ohio, U.S.
- Genres: Jazz
- Occupation(s): Bandleader, musician
- Instrument: Violin
- Labels: Vocalion Records

Austin James Wylie (1893 – December 7, 1947) was an American jazz bandleader.

== Biography ==
Wylie led a dance band in the 1920s and early 1930s which operated as a territory band based out of Cleveland, Ohio, though he also broadcast on national radio. The band was sometimes billed as the Golden Pheasant Orchestra. A number of noted jazz musicians played in Wylie's orchestra, such as Jack Jenney, Tony Pastor, Nate Kazebier, Spud Murphy, Bill Stegmeyer, Joe Bishop, Billy Butterfield, Johnnie Davis, Vaughn Monroe, Claude Thornhill, and Artie Shaw.

Shaw also served as arranger and director for the group. After Shaw formed his own band later in the 1930s, Wylie acted as his manager.

Wylie died at Crile Veterans Hospital in Parma, Ohio, at the age of 54.
