= Tanganyika (album) =

Studio album by Buddy Collette
- Released: 1956
- Recorded: October 11, 1956
- Studios: Capitol Records Studios, Hollywood, CA
- Genre: Jazz
- Length: 41:56
- Label: Dig J-101
- Producer: Sleepy Stein

Buddy Collette chronology
Tanganyika (1956)	Man of Many Parts (1957)

Tanganyika (subtitled Modern Afro-American Jazz) is an album by multi-instrumentalist and composer Buddy Collette recorded at sessions in late 1956 and released on Johnny Otis' short-lived Dig label.

== Reception ==
Professional ratings
Review scores
Source	Rating
Allmusic	3/5 stars
The Penguin Guide to Jazz Recordings	3/4 stars

Allmusic awarded the album 3 stars with the review by Scott Yanow stating "The music is mostly group originals (five by Collette) and is an excellent example of cool jazz".

== Track listing ==
All compositions by Buddy Collette except where noted.

1. "Green Dream" - 4:28
2. "It's You" - 2:27
3. "A Walk on the Veldt" - 3:23
4. "How Long Has This Been Going On?" (George Gershwin, Ira Gershwin) - 3:14
5. "The Blindfold Test" (John Anderson) - 6:50
6. "Jungle Pogo Stick" - 2:44
7. "Tanganyika" - 4:57
8. "Wagnervous" (Chico Hamilton, Gerald Wiggins) - 4:42
9. "And So Is Love" (Anderson) - 2:43
10. "Coming Back for More" (Johnny Otis) - 6:28

== Personnel ==
- Buddy Collette - tenor saxophone, alto saxophone, flute, clarinet
- Chico Hamilton - drums
- John Anderson - trumpet
- Gerald Wiggins - piano
- Jimmy Hall - guitar
- Curtis Counce - bass
