= Broadway – My Way =

Studio album by Nancy Wilson
- Released: March 1963
- Recorded: Nov. 6–7, 1962
- Genre: Vocal jazz
- Length: 42:05
- Label: Capitol
- Producer: Dave Cavanaugh

Nancy Wilson chronology
| Hello Young Lovers (1962) | Broadway – My Way (1963) | Hollywood – My Way (1963) |

Professional ratings
Review scores
| Source | Rating |
|---|---|
| Allmusic | 4/5 stars |
| Record Mirror | 4/5 stars |
| The Virgin Encyclopedia of Jazz | 4/5 stars |

Broadway – My Way is a studio album by Nancy Wilson released in March 1963 on Capitol Records. The album reached No. 18 on the Billboard 200 chart.

== Track listing ==
1. "A Lot of Livin' to Do" (Lee Adams, Charles Strouse) – 2:08
2. "You Can Have Him" (Irving Berlin) – 4:42
3. "Tonight" (Leonard Bernstein, Stephen Sondheim) – 2:33
4. "Make Someone Happy" (Betty Comden, Adolph Green, Jule Styne) – 3:17
5. "I Believe in You" (Frank Loesser) – 2:02
6. "As Long as He Needs Me" (Lionel Bart) – 2:29
7. "Getting to Know You" (Oscar Hammerstein II, Richard Rodgers) – 2:35
8. "My Ship" (Ira Gershwin, Kurt Weill) – 3:14
9. "The Sweetest Sounds" (Rodgers) – 2:04
10. "Joey, Joey, Joey" (Loesser) – 3:56
11. "Loads of Love" (Rodgers) – 2:12
12. "I'll Know" (Loesser) – 2:31
  Bonus tracks not included on the original 1964 release:
13. "Hello, Young Lovers" (Hammerstein, Rodgers) – 2:07
14. "If Ever I Would Leave You" (Alan Jay Lerner, Frederick Loewe) – 2:57
15. "I'm All Smiles" (Michael Leonard, Herbert Martin) – 1:45
16. "Come Back to Me" (Burton Lane, Lerner) – 2:35
17. "Don't Rain on My Parade" (Bob Merrill, Styne) – 2:12

== Personnel ==
- Nancy Wilson – vocals
- Don Fagerquist – trumpet
- Lew McCreary – trombone
- Buddy Collette – saxophone
- Bill Perkins – saxophone
- Paul Horn – reeds
- John Michael Gray – guitar
- Joe Comfort – double bass
- Lou Levy – piano
- Kenny Dennis – drums
- Emil Richards – percussion
- Gerald Wilson – arranger, conductor
- Jimmy Jones – piano
- Milt Raskin – conductor, orchestration
- George Shearing – arranger, string arrangements
