= Great Ideas of Western Mann =

Studio album by Herbie Mann's Californians
- Released: 1957
- Recorded: July 3, 1957; Los Angeles, California
- Genre: Jazz
- Length: 39:11
- Label: Riverside; RLP 12-245
- Producer: Orrin Keepnews

Herbie Mann chronology
Yardbird Suite (1957)	Great Ideas of Western Mann (1957)	Flute Fraternity (1957)

Great Ideas of Western Mann (also released as Herbie Mann Quintet featuring Jack Sheldon) is an album by American jazz flautist/clarinetist Herbie Mann's Californians featuring tracks recorded in 1957 for the Riverside label.

== Reception ==
Professional ratings
Review scores
Source	Rating
Allmusic	4/5 stars
The Penguin Guide to Jazz Recordings	4/4 stars

Allmusic awarded the album 4 stars stating "it was probably the first album of jazz in which the leader recorded entirely on bass clarinet... Mann phrases on the bass clarinet pretty much the way he does on flute, with a definite personality, plenty of swing, and a airy outlook that makes the instrument sound less sinister. Stylistically, this is strictly a mainstream West Coast bop blowing session".

== Track listing ==
1. "The Theme" (Miles Davis) - 6:41
2. "Lady Bird" (Tadd Dameron) - 8:58
3. "Get Out of Town" (Cole Porter) - 5:37
4. "Is It True What They Say About Dixie?" (Irving Caesar, Sammy Lerner, Gerald Marks) - 5:33
5. "A Handful of Stars" (Jack Lawrence, Ted Shapiro) - 7:32
6. "A Stella Performance" (Herbie Mann) - 8:46

== Personnel ==
- Herbie Mann - bass clarinet
- Jack Sheldon - trumpet
- Jimmy Rowles - piano
- Buddy Clark - bass
- Mel Lewis - drums
