= Four Saxophones in Twelve Tones =

Studio album by Lyle Murphy
- Released: 1955
- Recorded: November 3 and December 3, 1954
- Studio: Capitol, 5515 Melrose, Hollywood
- Genre: Jazz
- Label: GNP; Vol. 9
- Producer: Gene Norman

Four Saxophones in Twelve Tones is an album by composer/arranger Lyle Murphy recorded in 1954 and released on the GNP label. This was the first recording utilizing Murphy's own 12-tone system of composition.

== Track listing ==
1. "Tone Poem" (Lyle Murphy)
2. "I Only Have Eyes for You" (Harry Warren, Al Dubin)
3. "Frantastic" (Murphy)
4. "Caleta" (Murphy, Eddie Laguna)
5. "Lost in Fugue" (Murphy)
6. "Frankly Speaking" (Murphy)
7. "Illusion" (Murphy)
8. "Crazy Quilt" (Murphy)

== Personnel ==
- Frank Morgan – alto saxophone (soloist)
- Russ Cheever – soprano saxophone
- Benny Carter – alto saxophone
- Buddy Collette – tenor saxophone
- Bob Gordon – baritone saxophone
- Lyle Murphy – celeste
- Buddy Clark – bass
- Chico Hamilton (tracks 1–4) and Richie Frost (tracks 5–8) – drums
