= Concerto for Clarinet (Shaw) =

Composition by Artie Shaw

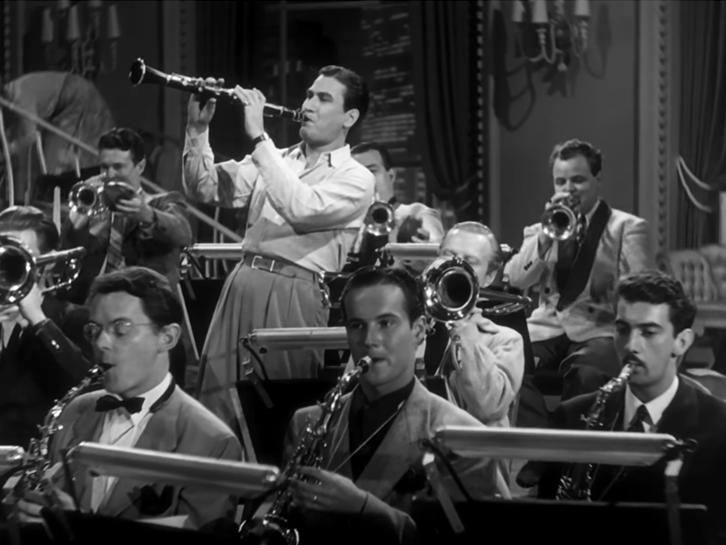
Shaw in a scene from the film Second Chorus (1940)

Concerto for Clarinet is a composition for clarinet and jazz orchestra by Artie Shaw. The piece ends with a "legendary" altissimo C. The piece is a "pastiche thrown together out of some boogie-woogie blues, clarinet-over-tomtom interludes, a commonplace riff build-up towards the end, all encased in opening and closing virtuoso cadenzas for the leader's clarinet".

Shaw and his orchestra performed the piece in the Fred Astaire film Second Chorus (1940), in which Shaw played himself.

Harry James recorded a version in 1955 on his album Jazz Session (Columbia CL 669).
