= The Art Tatum–Ben Webster Quartet =

Studio album by Art Tatum and Ben Webster
- Released: 1958
- Recorded: September 11, 1956
- Studios: Los Angeles, California
- Genre: Jazz
- Length: 42:03
- Labels: Verve; MGV-8220
- Producer: Norman Granz

Art Tatum chronology
The Lionel Hampton Art Tatum Buddy Rich Trio (1956)	The Art Tatum–Ben Webster Quartet (1958)

Ben Webster chronology
Music for Loving (1954-55)	The Art Tatum–Ben Webster Quartet (1956)	Soulville (1957)

The Art Tatum–Ben Webster Quartet is an album by pianist Art Tatum and saxophonist Ben Webster featuring tracks recorded in 1956 by the Verve label and released as a 12-inch LP in 1958. It was reissued as The Tatum Group Masterpieces, Volume Eight by Pablo in 1975.

== Reception ==
Professional ratings
Review scores
Source	Rating
AllMusic	4/5 stars
The Penguin Guide to Jazz Recordings	4/4 stars

AllMusic's review by William Ruhlmann states, "Tatum never subsides to simple comping; he just keeps soloing away under Webster's rich tenor tones until Webster stops playing, and then keeps on to the end. So, although this is billed as a group effort, it's not a group of equals or really one in which the players are cooperating with each other. Tatum might as well be playing solo, since he takes very little account of what's happening around him. Granz makes it work by varying the volume of the different instruments in the mix, and the result is a fascinating study in contrasts."

The Penguin Guide to Jazz Recordings selected the reissue as part of its suggested "core collection" of essential recordings.

== Track listing ==
1. "All the Things You Are" (Jerome Kern, Oscar Hammerstein II) – 7:12
2. "My One and Only Love" (Guy Wood, Robert Mellin) – 6:15
3. "My Ideal" (Newell Chase, Leo Robin, Richard A. Whiting) – 7:14
4. "Gone with the Wind" (Allie Wrubel, Herb Magidson) – 4:45
5. "Have You Met Miss Jones?" (Richard Rodgers, Lorenz Hart) – 4:46
6. "Night and Day" (Cole Porter) – 5:27
7. "Where or When" (Rogers, Hart) – 6:24

== Personnel ==
- Art Tatum – piano
- Ben Webster – tenor saxophone
- Red Callender – bass
- Bill Douglass – drums
