= Dingo (soundtrack) =

Soundtrack album by Miles Davis and Michel Legrand
- Released: November 5, 1991
- Recorded: March 1990
- Studios: Crystal Studios (Los Angeles, CA)
- Genre: Jazz
- Length: 45:45
- Label: Warner Bros.
- Producer: Gordon Meltzer

Miles Davis chronology
First Miles (1990)	Dingo (1991)	Doo-Bop (1992)

Professional ratings
Review scores
Source	Rating
Allmusic	2/5 stars

Dingo: Selections from the Motion Picture Soundtrack is the soundtrack to the 1991 movie of the same name. It was composed by Michel Legrand and Miles Davis. It was the last album Miles Davis completed before his death in 1991.

== Track listing ==
All tracks are written by Michel Legrand.

No.	Title	Length
1.	"Kimberley Trumpet"	2:15
2.	"The Arrival"	2:05
3.	"Concert on the Runway"	3:50
4.	"The Departure"	1:05
5.	"Dingo Howl"	0:08
6.	"Letter as Hero"	1:22
7.	"Trumpet Cleaning"	3:56
8.	"The Dream"	3:45
9.	"Paris Walking I"	1:58
10.	"Paris Walking II"	3:17
11.	"Kimberley Trumpet in Paris"	2:05
12.	"The Music Room"	2:50
13.	"Club Entrance"	4:12
14.	"The Jam Session"	6:00
15.	"Going Home"	2:05
16.	"Surprise!"	4:52

== Personnel ==
Musicians

- Jimmy Cleveland – trombone
- Buddy Collette – woodwind
- Miles Davis – trumpet
- Marty Krystall – woodwind
- Michel Legrand – keyboards, arranger and conductor
- Alphonse Mouzon – drums, percussion
- Charles Owens – woodwind
- Kei Akagi – keyboards
- Richard Todd – French horn
- Foley – bass
- John Bigham – drums, percussion
- George Bohanon – trombone
- Oscar Brashear – trumpet
- Ray Brown – trumpet
- David Duke – French horn
- Chuck Findley – trumpet
- Kenny Garrett – alto saxophone
- George Graham – trumpet
- Bill Green – woodwind
- Thurman Green – trombone
- Marni Johnson – French horn
- Jackie Kelso – woodwind
- Abraham Laboriel – bass
- Harvey Mason Sr. – drums, percussion
- Lew McCreary – trombone
- Dick Nash – trombone
- Alan Oldfield – keyboards
- Benny Rietveld – bass
- Mark Rivett – guitar
- Nolan Andrew Smith – trumpet
- John Stephens – woodwind
- Ricky Wellman – drums, percussion
- Vincent DeRosa – French horn
- Terrance Thomas – Saxophone
