= Joe Comfort =

American jazz bassist (1917–1988)

Joe Comfort (July 18, 1917 – October 29, 1988) was an American jazz double bassist.

== Biography ==
A native of Los Angeles who was raised in Watts, Joe Comfort was taught trombone by his father and began his musical career with the Woodman Brothers, who, like Joe, were also from Watts. Joe and the Woodmans used to toss their instruments in the air, catching each other's woods and reeds performing extensively all over Los Angeles. In the 1940s, Joe played bass in the Lionel Hampton band up until Joe was drafted for war, training at Fort Rucker, Alabama and then serving in the US Army band that went to France. Upon returning, Joe worked with Nat King Cole which included extensive travel across the US and in Europe and featured on many recordings including Nat's iconic hit, Nature Boy. Joe also worked separately with Cole's guitarist, Oscar Moore. Beginning in the 1950s, he was a studio musician who recorded soundtracks and pop music with Nelson Riddle, Frank Sinatra and Ella Fitzgerald

== Discography ==
=== As sideman ===
With Rosemary Clooney

- 1961 Rosie Solves the Swingin' Riddle!
- 1963 Love

With Buddy Collette

- 1956 Man of Many Parts (Contemporary)
- 1958 Buddy Collette's Swinging Shepherds (EmArcy)

With Ella Fitzgerald

- 1963 Ella Fitzgerald Sings the Jerome Kern Song Book
- 1984 The Stockholm Concert, 1966 with Duke Ellington

With Gerald Wiggins

- 1953 Gerald Wiggins Trio
- 1957 Wiggin' with Wig
- 1961 Relax and Enjoy It

With Nancy Wilson

- 1960 Something Wonderful
- 1963 Broadway – My Way

With others

- 1954 Musical Sounds Are the Best Sounds, Mel Tormé
- 1954 The Oscar Moore Quartet with Carl Perkins, Oscar Moore
- 1955 In the Land of Hi-Fi with Georgie Auld and His Orchestra, Georgie Auld (EmArcy)
- 1955 It's All Over but the Swingin', Sammy Davis Jr. (Decca)
- 1956 More Harry James in Hi-Fi, Harry James
- 1957 Ernie Andrews, Ernie Andrews
- 1958 Aspects, Benny Carter
- 1959 Jump for Joy, Peggy Lee
- 1959 T-Bone Blues, T-Bone Walker (Atlantic)
- 1960 First, Oscar Pettiford
- 1961 Al Hibbler Sings the Blues: Monday Every Day, Al Hibbler (Reprise)
- 1962 Sarah + 2, Sarah Vaughan (Roulette)
- 1962 Warm & Wild, Vic Dana
- 1964 Sweets for the Sweet Taste of Love, Harry Edison (Vee-Jay)
- 1964 Kenton / Wagner, Stan Kenton (Capitol)
- 1964 Get Ready, Set, Jump!!!, Junior Mance (Capitol)
- 1965 L-O-V-E, Nat King Cole (Capitol)
- 1967 That Man, Robert Mitchum, Sings, Robert Mitchum (Monument)
- 1976 Memoirs, Irving Ashby (Accent)

=== Posthumous ===
- 2003 Harry Edison Quartet at the Haig 1953, Harry Edison (Fresh Sound)
