= Hello Young Lovers (Nancy Wilson album) =

Studio album by Nancy Wilson
- Released: July 1962
- Recorded: 1962
- Genre: Traditional pop, jazz
- Length: 32:59
- Label: Capitol – T-1767

Nancy Wilson chronology
Nancy Wilson and Cannonball Adderley (1962)	Hello Young Lovers (1962)	Broadway – My Way (1963)

Hello Young Lovers is a studio album by singer Nancy Wilson issued in July 1962 on Capitol Records. The album rose to No. 4 on the Billboard Vocal Jazz Albums chart.

== Overview ==
Hello Young Lovers was produced by Tom Morgan and arranged by Milt Raskin. George Shearing also arranged the strings and played harpsichord on the LP.

== Reception ==
Professional ratings
Review scores
Source	Rating
Allmusic	3/5 stars
The Virgin Encyclopedia of Jazz	4/5 stars
Billboard	(favourable)
New Record Mirror	4/5 stars

Billboard magazine noted that she "shows off her own, stylish way with a pop song on this album cover over a lush string choir" and declared that the "Lass does a fine job here".

Stephen Cook of Allmusic proclaimed that the LP "contains Wilson's standard program of easy swingers and ballads that show off her impeccable phrasing while sporting George Shearing's luxurious string charts in hits like "Little Girl Blue" and "Back in Your Own Backyard." He noted that "one also hears Wilson's burgeoning talent for vocal drama as she evokes a variety of moods" as "the listening pleasure is found mostly in her signature urbane pop sound".

== Track listing ==
1. "A Good Man Is Hard to Find" (Eddie Green) – 3:03
2. "Hello, Young Lovers" (Oscar Hammerstein II, Richard Rodgers) – 2:08
3. "Sophisticated Lady" (Duke Ellington, Irving Mills) – 2:34
4. "When a Woman Loves a Man" (Bernie Hanighen, Gordon Jenkins, Johnny Mercer) – 2:29
5. "Little Girl Blue" (Lorenz Hart, Rodgers) – 2:52
6. "Nina Never Knew" (Louis Alter, Milton Drake) – 2:48
7. "You Don't Know What Love Is" (Gene de Paul, Don Raye) – 2:37
8. "Put On a Happy Face" (Lee Adams, Charles Strouse) – 1:54
9. "When Sunny Gets Blue" (Marvin Fisher, Jack Segal) – 2:58
10. "Listen, Little Girl" (Frances Landesman, Tommy Wolf) – 3:15
11. "Miss Otis Regrets" (Cole Porter) – 3:29
12. "Back in Your Own Backyard" (Dave Dreyer, Al Jolson, Billy Rose) – 2:52

== Personnel ==
- Nancy Wilson – vocals
- George Shearing – arranger, harpsichord on "Miss Otis Regrets"
- Milt Raskin – arranger
