= I'll Never Stop Loving You (1955 song) =

"I'll Never Stop Loving You" is a popular music song, with music written by Nicholas Brodzsky and lyrics by Sammy Cahn for the 1955 film Love Me or Leave Me. The song was published in 1955.

The recording by Doris Day was released by Columbia Records as catalog number 40505. It first reached the Billboard magazine charts on July 23, 1955. On the Disk Jockey chart, it peaked at #13; on the Best Seller chart, at #15; on the composite chart of the top 100 songs, it reached #93 (a misleading figure, because the top-100 list was started by Billboard after the peak of the song's popularity).

The song was nominated for the 1955 Academy Award for Best Original Song but lost to "Love Is a Many-Splendored Thing" from the film of the same name.

== Other recordings ==
- Andy Williams released a version of the song on his 1964 album, The Academy Award–Winning "Call Me Irresponsible" and Other Hit Songs from the Movies.
- Bing Crosby recorded the song in 1955 for use on his radio show and it was subsequently included in the box set The Bing Crosby CBS Radio Recordings (1954-56) issued by Mosaic Records (catalog MD7-245) in 2009.
- British singer David Whitfield recorded a cover version in 1955.
- Dinah Washington - included in the album Dinah Washington (1964).
- Nancy Wilson - included in her album Hollywood – My Way (1963).
- Slim Whitman - a single release for the Imperial label (1955).
- British singer Dusty Springfield performed the song live on the first season of her popular BBC television series Dusty on 8 September 1966; an audio recording of the performance was issued on the 2001 Dusty Springfield Bulletin and Zone Records charity set Good Times: The Best of Dusty Springfield's BBC TV Performances 1966-1979, as well as on the 2011 boxed sets Goin' Back: The Definitive Dusty Springfield and The Magic of Dusty Springfield.

== Popular culture ==
The song was featured in the popular tv series The Saint, starring Roger Moore, in the episode "The Saint Sees It Through", and was sung by co-star Margit Saad.
