= At the Cinema! =

Studio album by Buddy Collette's Swinging Shephers
- Released: 1959
- Recorded: January 10 & 17 and February 21, 1959; Master Recorders in Hollywood, CA
- Genre: Jazz
- Label: Mercury MG 20447 / SR 60132

Buddy Collette chronology
Buddy Collette's Swinging Shepherds (1958)	At the Cinema! (1959)	Warm Winds (1964)

At the Cinema! is an album by multi-instrumentalist and composer Buddy Collette's Swinging Shepherds, a jazz group featuring four flautists, recorded in early 1959 and released on the Mercury label.

== Reception ==
Professional ratings
Review scores
Source	Rating
Allmusic	3/5 stars

The Allmusic review by Scott Yanow states: "Assisted by a fine West Coast rhythm section, Collette and his fellow flutists perform concise versions of 11 songs that were used in the movies. The repertoire ranges from standards such as 'Laura,' 'I Can't Believe That You're in Love with Me' and 'Invitation' to a few lesser-known numbers. The treatments are quite respectful but of interest to jazz listeners".

== Track listing ==
1. "Colonel Bogey & River Kwai March" (Kenneth J. Alford, Malcolm Arnold) - 3:35
2. "Laura" (David Raksin) - 2:37
3. "Smile" (Charlie Chaplin) - 3:04
4. "The Bad and the Beautiful (Love Is for the Very Young)" (Raksin) - 4:09
5. "The Shrike" (Pete Rugolo) - 3:23
6. "I Can't Believe That You're in Love with Me" (Jimmy McHugh, Clarence Gaskill) - 2:43
7. "The Trolley Song" (Hugh Martin, Ralph Blane) - 1:50
8. "Intermezzo" (Rugolo) - 3:25
9. "Ruby" (Heinz Roemheld, Mitchell Parish) - 3:20
10. "Invitation" (Bronisław Kaper) - 3:52
11. "Swinging on a Star" (Jimmy Van Heusen, Johnny Burke) - 2:51

== Personnel ==
- Buddy Collette, Paul Horn, Bud Shank - flute, alto flute, piccolo
- Harry Klee - flute, alto flute, bass flute
- Bill Miller (tracks 1–3, 7 & 9), John Williams (tracks 4–6, 8, 10 & 11) - piano
- Jim Hall - guitar
- Red Mitchell - bass
- Earl Palmer (tracks 1–3 & 7–9), Shelly Manne (tracks 4–6, 10 & 11) - drums
- Buddy Collette, Paul Horn, Pete Rugolo, Bud Shank - arranger
