= John Anderson (jazz trumpeter) =

American jazz trumpeter (1921–1974)

- Born: January 31, 1921; Birmingham, Alabama, U.S.
- Died: August 18, 1974 (aged 53); Birmingham, Alabama, U.S.
- Genres: Jazz, West Coast jazz
- Instrument: Trumpet

John Anderson (January 31, 1921 – August 18, 1974) was an American jazz trumpeter. Born in Birmingham, Alabama, he studied at the Los Angeles Conservatory of Music and the Westlake College of Music. He did a good deal of work in West Coast jazz with Stan Kenton and others. Anderson died in Birmingham in 1974.

== Discography ==
With Count Basie

- Everyday I Have the Blues (Roulette, 1959) - with Joe Williams
- Dance Along with Basie (Roulette, 1959)
- The Count Basie Story (Roulette, 1960)

With Buddy Collette

- Tanganyika (Dig, 1956)

With Chico Hamilton

- Chic Chic Chico (Impulse!, 1965)

With Stan Kenton

- Stan Kenton's Milestones (Capitol, 1943-47 [1950])
- Stan Kenton Classics (Capitol, 1944-47 [1952])
- Artistry in Rhythm (Capitol, 1946)
- Encores (Capitol, 1947)
- A Presentation of Progressive Jazz (Capitol, 1947)
- The Kenton Era (Capitol, 1940–54, [1955])
- Two Much! (Capitol, 1960) with Ann Richards
