= Everybody's Buddy =

1958 album by Buddy Collette

Studio album by Buddy Collette
- Released: October 1958
- Recorded: May 14 & 15, 1957
- Studio: Radio Recorders in Hollywood, CA
- Genre: Jazz
- Label: Challenge CHL-603
- Producer: David Axelrod

Buddy Collette chronology
Cool, Calm & Collette (1957)	Everybody's Buddy (1958)	Porgy & Bess (1957)

Everybody's Buddy is an album by multi-instrumentalist and composer Buddy Collette recorded at sessions in 1957 and released on the Challenge label.

== Reception ==
Professional ratings
Review scores
Source	Rating
Allmusic	3/5 stars

The Allmusic site rated the album with 3 stars.

== Track listing ==
All compositions by Buddy Collette except where noted.

1. "Tasty Dish" - 5:41
2. "I Still Love You" - 3:26
3. "Orlando Blues" - 4:37
4. "Mrs. Potts" (Eugene Wright) - 3:20
5. "Soft Touch" - 3:46
6. "You Better Go Now" (Irvin Graham, Bickley Reichner) - 3:34
7. "Old School" (Wright) - 4:46
8. "Debbie" (Dick Shreve) - 3:57
- Recorded at Radio Recorders Studio in Hollywood, May 14 (tracks 1, 2, 4 & 6), and May 15 (tracks 3, 5, 7 & 8), 1957

== Personnel ==
- Buddy Collette - tenor saxophone, flute, clarinet
- Howard Roberts - guitar (tracks 1, 2, 4 & 6)
- Dick Shreve (tracks 3, 5, 7 & 8), Gerald Wiggins (tracks 1, 2, 4 & 6) - piano
- Eugene Wright - bass
- Bill Richmond - drums
