= Gil Fuller & the Monterey Jazz Festival Orchestra featuring Dizzy Gillespie =

Studio album by Gil Fuller and Dizzy Gillespie
- Released: 1965
- Recorded: October 1965; Pacific Jazz Studios, Los Angeles
- Genre: Jazz
- Length: 36:12
- Label: Pacific Jazz; PJ 93
- Producer: Richard Bock

Dizzy Gillespie chronology
Jambo Caribe (1964)	Gil Fuller & the Monterey Jazz Festival Orchestra featuring Dizzy Gillespie (1965)	The Melody Lingers On (1966)

Gil Fuller & the Monterey Jazz Festival Orchestra featuring Dizzy Gillespie is an album by composer, arranger and conductor Gil Fuller featuring trumpeter Dizzy Gillespie recorded in 1965 and originally released on the Pacific Jazz label. The album was rereleased on CD combined with Fuller's Night Flight (Pacific Jazz, 1965) on the Blue Note label as Gil Fuller & the Monterey Jazz Festival Orchestra featuring Dizzy Gillespie & James Moody in 2008.

== Reception ==
The Allmusic review called the album "A bit of a disappointment... the big band is mostly heard from in a purely accompanying role behind the great trumpeter and little interplay occurs".

Professional ratings
Review scores
Source	Rating
Allmusic	2.5/5 stars
The Penguin Guide to Jazz Recordings	3.5/4 stars

== Track listing ==
All compositions by Gil Fuller except as indicated

1. "Man from Monterey" (Phil Moore) - 4:00
2. "Angel City" - 8:20
3. "Love Theme from the Sandpiper" (Johnny Mandel, Paul Francis Webster) - 2:48
4. "Groovin' High" (Dizzy Gillespie) - 3:27
5. "Be's That Way" - 4:39
6. "Big Sur" - 4:37
7. "Moontide" - 3:56
8. "Things Are Here" (Gillespie) - 4:19

== Personnel ==
- Gil Fuller - arranger, conductor
- Dizzy Gillespie, John Audino, Harry 'Sweets' Edison, Freddie Hill, Melvin Moore - trumpet
- Gabe Baltazar, Buddy Collette - alto saxophone
- Bill Green, Carrington Visor - tenor saxophone
- Jack Nimitz - baritone saxophone
- Sam Cassano, David Duke, Herman Lebow, Alan Robinson - French horn
- Jim Amlotte, Bob Fitzpatrick, Lester Robinson - trombone
- Dennis Budimir - guitar
- Phil Moore - piano
- Jimmy Bond - bass
- Earl Palmer - drums
