= Night Flight (Gil Fuller album) =

Studio album by Gil Fuller and James Moody
- Released: 1966
- Recorded: November 14, 23 & 24, 1965
- Studio: Pacific Jazz Studios, Los Angeles
- Genre: Jazz
- Length: 38:34
- Label: Pacific Jazz; PJ 10101
- Producer: Richard Bock

Gil Fuller chronology
Gil Fuller & the Monterey Jazz Festival Orchestra featuring Dizzy Gillespie (1965)	Night Flight (1966)

Professional ratings
Review scores
Source	Rating
Allmusic	3/5 stars

Night Flight is an album by composer, arranger and conductor Gil Fuller featuring saxophonist James Moody recorded in 1965 and originally released on the Pacific Jazz label. The album was rereleased on CD combined with Gil Fuller & the Monterey Jazz Festival Orchestra featuring Dizzy Gillespie (Pacific Jazz, 1965) on the Blue Note label as Gil Fuller & the Monterey Jazz Festival Orchestra featuring Dizzy Gillespie & James Moody in 2008.

== Track listing ==
All compositions by Gil Fuller except as indicated

1. "Tin Tin Deo" (Gil Fuller, Chano Pozo) - 2:53
2. "I'm in the Mood for Love" (Dorothy Fields, Jimmy McHugh) - 3:36
3. "Night Flight" (Johnny Mangus) - 3:02
4. "Our Man Flint" (Jerry Goldsmith) - 3:01
5. "Seesaw" - 3:36
6. "Batucada Surgiu" (Marcos Valle, Paulo Sergio Valle) - 2:25
7. "17 Mile Drive" - 4:11
8. "A Patch of Blue" (Goldsmith) - 2:41
9. "Latin Lady" - 5:36
10. "Blues for a Debutante" - 2:34
11. "Sweets for My Sweet" (Doc Pomus, Mort Shuman) - 2:50
12. "Wild Chestnuts" (Bill Hood) - 2:20

== Personnel ==
- Gil Fuller - arranger, conductor
- James Moody - flute, alto saxophone, tenor saxophone
- Gabe Baltazar, Bill Green - alto saxophone
- Ira Schulman, Clifford Scott - tenor saxophone
- Bill Hood - baritone saxophone
- Conte Candoli, Chuck Foster, Melvin Moore, Al Porcino, Jimmy Zito - trumpet
- Sam Cassano, Alan Robinson, Gale Robinson - French horn
- Lou Blackburn - trombone
- Bob Enevoldsen - valve trombone
- Ernie Tack - bass trombone
- Mike Wofford - piano
- George Samper - organ
- Chuck Berghofer - bass
- Chuck Flores - drums
- Francisco Aguabella - percussion
