= Artie Shaw =

American clarinetist and bandleader (1910–2004)

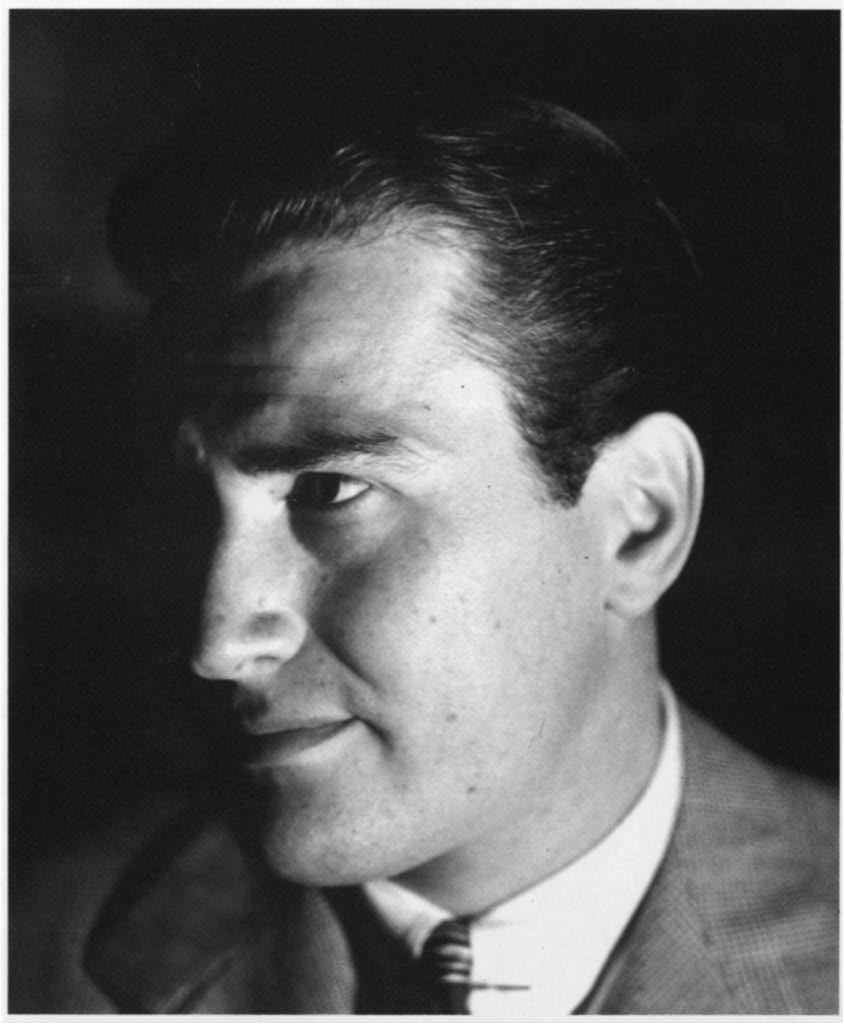
- Shaw, c. 1947

Background information
- Born: Arthur Jacob Arshawsky; May 23, 1910; New York City, U.S.
- Died: December 30, 2004 (aged 94) Thousand Oaks, California, U.S.
- Genres: Jazz; swing
- Occupations: Musician; bandleader; composer; author
- Instruments: Clarinet; saxophone
- Years active: 1925–1954

Artie Shaw (born Arthur Jacob Arshawsky; May 23, 1910 – December 30, 2004) was an American clarinetist, composer, bandleader, and author of both fiction and non-fiction.

Widely regarded as "one of jazz's finest clarinetists," Shaw led one of the United States' most popular big bands in the late 1930s through the early 1940s. Though he had numerous hit records, he was perhaps best known for his 1938 recording of Cole Porter's "Begin the Beguine." Before the release of "Beguine," Shaw and his fledgling band had languished in relative obscurity for over two years and, after its release, he became a major pop artist in short order. The record eventually became one of the era's defining recordings. Musically restless, Shaw was also an early proponent of what became known much later as Third Stream music, which blended elements of classical and jazz forms and traditions. His music influenced other musicians, such as Monty Norman in England, whose "James Bond Theme" features a vamp possibly influenced by Shaw's 1938 recording of "Nightmare."

Shaw also recorded with small jazz groups drawn from within the ranks of the big bands he led. He served in the U.S. Navy from 1942 to 1944, during which time he led a morale-building band that toured the South Pacific. Following his discharge in 1944, he returned to lead a band through 1945. Following the breakup of that band, he began to focus on other interests and gradually withdrew from the world of being a professional musician and major celebrity, although he remained a force in popular music and jazz before retiring from music completely in 1954.

== Early life ==
Arthur Jacob Arshawsky was born on May 23, 1910 in New York City. His mother was Sarah (née Strauss) and his father was Harold "Harry" Arshawsky, a dressmaker and photographer. The family was Jewish; his father was from Russia, his mother from Austria.

Shaw grew up in New Haven, Connecticut, where his natural introversion was deepened by local antisemitism. He bought a saxophone by working in a grocery store and began learning to play it at 13. At 16, he switched to the clarinet, and left home to tour with a band.

== Career ==
Returning to New York, he became a session musician through the early 1930s. From 1925 to 1936, Shaw performed with many bands and orchestras; from 1926 to 1929, he worked in Cleveland and established a lasting reputation as music director and arranger for an orchestra led by the violinist Austin Wylie. In 1929 and 1930, he played with Irving Aaronson's Commanders, where he was exposed to symphonic music, which he would later incorporate in his arrangements. In 1932, Shaw joined the Roger Wolfe Kahn Orchestra and made several recordings with the outfit including "It Don't Mean a Thing (If It Ain't Got That Swing)" and "Fit as a Fiddle".

=== Bandleader ===
In 1935, he first gained attention with his "Interlude in B-flat" at a swing concert at the Imperial Theater in New York. During the swing era, his big bands were popular with hits like "Begin the Beguine" (1938), "Stardust" (with a trumpet solo by Billy Butterfield), "Back Bay Shuffle," "Moonglow," "Rosalie," and "Frenesi." The band was well received, but was forced to dissolve in 1937 because its sound was not commercial. Shaw valued experimental and innovative music over dancing and love songs.

He was an innovator in the big band idiom using unusual instrumentation; "Interlude in B-flat," where he was backed with only a rhythm section and a string quartet, was one of the earliest examples of what would be later dubbed Third Stream. His incorporation of stringed instruments could be attributed to the influence of the classical composer Igor Stravinsky.

In addition to hiring Buddy Rich, he signed Billie Holiday as his band's vocalist in 1938, becoming the first white band leader to hire a full-time black female singer to tour the segregated Southern U.S. After recording "Any Old Time," however, Holiday left the band due to hostility from audiences in the South, as well as from music company executives who wanted a more "mainstream" singer.

Like his main rival, Benny Goodman, and other leaders of big bands, Shaw fashioned a smaller "band within the band" in 1940. He named it Artie Shaw and the Gramercy Five after his home telephone exchange. Band pianist Johnny Guarnieri played harpsichord on the quintet recordings, and Al Hendrickson played electric guitar. Trumpeter Roy Eldridge became part of the group, succeeding Billy Butterfield. In 1940, the original Gramercy Five cut eight sides, then Shaw dissolved the band in early 1941. The Gramercy Five's biggest hit was "Summit Ridge Drive", one of Shaw's million-selling records. His last prewar band, organized in September 1941, included Oran "Hot Lips" Page, Max Kaminsky, Georgie Auld, Dave Tough, Jack Jenney, Ray Conniff and Guarnieri.

The long series of musical groups Shaw subsequently formed included Lena Horne, Helen Forrest, Mel Tormé, Buddy Rich, Dave Tough, Barney Kessel, Jimmy Raney, Tal Farlow, Dodo Marmarosa, and Ray Conniff. He used the morose "Nightmare," with its Hasidic nuances, as his theme rather than choosing a more accessible song. In a televised interview in the 1970s, Shaw derided the "asinine" songs of Tin Pan Alley that were the lifeblood of popular music and which bands, especially the most popular (such as his own) were compelled to play night after night. In 1994, he told Frank Prial of The New York Times: "I thought that because I was Artie Shaw I could do what I wanted, but all they wanted was 'Begin the Beguine'".

Throughout his career, Shaw had a habit of forming bands, developing them according to his immediate aspirations, making a quick series of records, and then disbanding. He generally did not stick around long enough to reap his bands' successes through live performances of their recorded hits. Following the breakup of what was already his second band in 1939, he rarely toured at all and, if he did, his personal appearances were usually limited to long-term engagements in a single venue or bookings that did not require much traveling, unlike many bands of the era that traveled great distances doing seemingly endless strings of one-night engagements.

=== Radio days ===
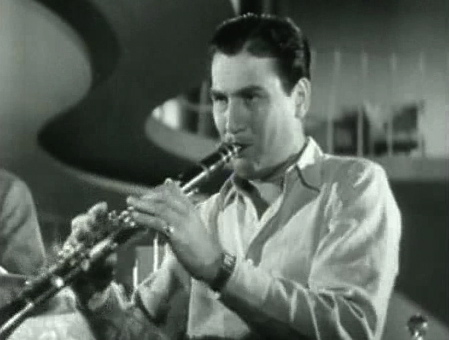
Artie Shaw performs his "Concerto for Clarinet" in 1940.

Shaw did many big band remote broadcasts. Throughout the autumn and winter of 1938, he was often heard from the Blue Room of the Hotel Lincoln in New York City. After touring in 1939, he led the house band at the Café Rouge of the Hotel Pennsylvania in New York. He was the headliner of a radio series with comedian Robert Benchley as emcee. Shaw broadcast on CBS from November 20, 1938, until November 14, 1939.

Shaw became increasingly disillusioned with not having time to develop new arrangements, and having to play the same pop tunes over and over. In an interview, he explained, "'Begin the Beguine' is a pretty nice tune. But not when you have to play it 500 nights in a row." Finally, in frustration, he walked off the Café Rouge bandstand while on the air, and quit the band two days later. He departed for Mexico, and the band continued without him into January but eventually broke up.

After Shaw returned from Mexico in 1940, and still under contract to RCA Victor, he experimented with a group of session musicians in Hollywood, trying to combine strings and woodwinds with a jazz band. The result was the hit "Frenesi".

He was hired as bandleader for the Burns and Allen Show broadcast from Hollywood. He organized a band that was modeled after his swing band concept of the late-1930s with the addition of six violins, two violas, and one cello. The addition of a string section to a big band was not novel, as it had been done by Paul Whiteman and others since the 1920s. Shaw updated the idea with the music trends of the 1940s. Strings gave him a wider tonal palette and allowed him to concentrate on ballads rather than the fast dance songs of the swing era. Shaw was at or near the top of the list of virtuoso jazz bandleaders. The band was showcased on the Burns and Allen program every week.

In 1940, at the height of his popularity, the 30-year-old Shaw earned up to $60,000 per week. In contrast, George Burns and Gracie Allen were each making $5,000 per week during the year that Shaw and his orchestra provided the music for their radio show. He acted on the show as a love interest for Gracie Allen. Shaw's contract was renewed for another 13 weeks when the program was moved to New York.

Shaw disliked having to be a part of the celebrity culture of the period, with its professional obligations. He told Metronome magazine: "I don't like the business of music. I'm unhappy in the music 'business.' Maybe I don't even belong in it. I like the music part, but for me the business part just plain stinks." Shaw also resented the constant pressure imposed on him by networks, agencies, publishers, and promoters. He summed up his feelings in a self-penned 1939 Saturday Evening Post article: "My job is to play music, not politics, and my only obligation is to the people who pay to listen to me. I don't attempt to ram hackneyed, insipid tunes down the public's throat just because they've been artificially hypoed to the so-called 'hit' class. This policy of trying to maintain some vestige of musical integrity has, naturally, earned me enemies, people who think I'm a longhair, impressed with my own ability. Nothing could be farther from the truth. My faith in dance music — I refuse to call it swing — borders on the fanatic. I have the utmost respect for the many real musicians who are creating a new music as important as the classics, but I have no respect for musical clowns who lead an orchestra with a baton and a quip. However, more power to them if they can make it pay."

When Shaw told his agents that he was walking away from the big band, they warned him that he couldn't do that; he had a million dollars in contracts that had to be honored. Shaw didn't care, and responded, "Tell 'em I'm insane. A nice, young American boy walking away from a million dollars, wouldn't you call that insane?"

Shaw broke up the Hollywood band, keeping a nucleus of seven musicians in addition to himself, and filled out the ensemble with New York musicians until March 1941. While taking a few months' vacation in the spring of 1941 to reassess what to do next, Shaw recorded in another small-group format with three horns and a four-man rhythm section with the addition of a dozen strings. By September, he formed a big band with seven brass, five saxes, four rhythm, and fifteen strings. On December 7, three months into the tour, the 31-piece band was in the midst of a matinee performance in Providence, Rhode Island, when he was given a note about the Japanese bombing of Pearl Harbor. The note instructed him to tell military personnel to return to their bases. Shaw was shaken by the news, as he told interviewer Freddie Johnson in 1994: "Everything seemed to pale into insignificance, and I had to go back out on stage and announce "Star Dust" or something, and it sounded so fatuous. Here we were in the middle of a conflagration. On impulse, I went to the front row of the band where Les Robinson, first alto man, was sitting, and I said, 'Pass the word. This is two weeks' notice.' It went through the band and we played the rest of that show with a pall over it. Anyway, I joined the Navy."

=== War and after ===
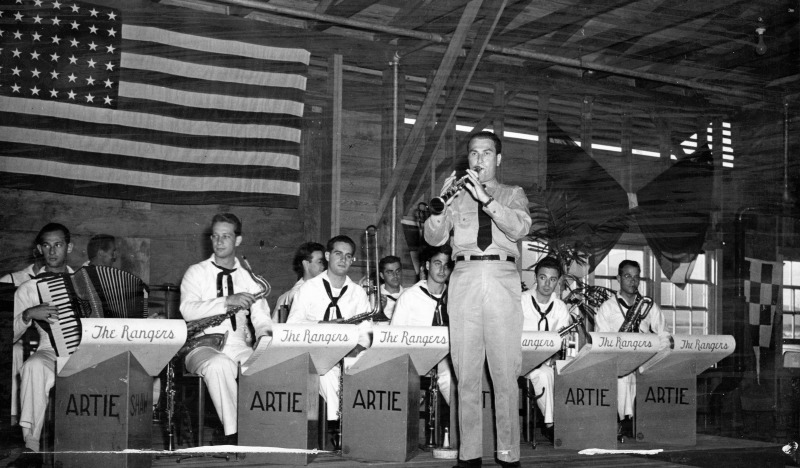
Artie Shaw and The Rangers, 1943

During World War II, Shaw enlisted in the United States Navy and shortly after formed a band, which served in the Pacific theater. After 18 months playing for Navy personnel, (sometimes as many as four concerts a day in battle zones, including Guadalcanal), Shaw returned to the U.S. in a state of physical exhaustion and received a medical discharge. After the war, the popularity of big bands declined, as crooners and bebop began to dominate the charts.

Shaw credited his time in the Navy from 1942 to 1944 as a period of renewed introspection. After his discharge, he entered psychoanalysis and began to withdraw from music in favor of a writing career. His autobiography, The Trouble With Cinderella: An Outline of Identity, was published in 1952 (with later reprint editions in 1992 and 2001). Revealing downbeat elements of the music business, Shaw explained that "the trouble with Cinderella" is "nobody ever lives happily ever after." He turned to semi-autobiographical fiction with the three short novels in I Love You, I Hate You, Drop Dead! (1965, reprinted in 1997), which prompted Terry Southern's comment: "Here is a deeply probing examination of the American marital scene. I flipped over it!" Shaw's short stories, including "Snow White in Harlem", were collected in The Best of Intentions and Other Stories (1989). He worked for years on his 1,000-page autobiographical novel, The Education of Albie Snow, but the three-volume work remained unpublished.

After his discharge in 1944, he formed another band, this time what could be considered a modern big band in that it contained what is now considered the standard eight brass and five saxes. It did not include any strings and was based in Hollywood, California, where Shaw was living. He continued to record for RCA Victor, as he had before the war, and limited the band's personal appearances to military bases in California. In August 1945, his contract with RCA ended and he signed with an independent label, Musicraft. He made a few records for Musicraft before the band broke up, and all of the recordings for Musicraft from 1946 were staffed by top-notch session musicians. The big band was back in the studio, this time including strings. On these Musicraft recordings in 1946 Shaw featured the young singer Mel Tormé. On some of the sides, Tormé was also featured with his vocal group the Meltones.

In the late 1940s Shaw commissioned Norman Dello Joio to compose a solo work; Shaw premiered the resultant Concertante for Clarinet and Orchestra with the Chautauqua (NY) Symphony on 23 July 1949, Franco Autori conducting. Two Ohio performances later that year were with the Dayton Philharmonic (3 November) and Cleveland Orchestra (18 December). Shaw again performed the work in The Town Hall on 20 February 1950 with Thomas Scherman and the Little Orchestra Society; on the preceding day (19 February) Shaw had performed the Mozart concerto in Newark (NJ) with Scherman and the L.O.S.

In July 1954, Shaw undertook a brief Australian tour for promoter Lee Gordon on which he shared the bill with drummer Buddy Rich and vocalist Ella Fitzgerald. After completing that tour Shaw stopped playing the clarinet, citing his own perfectionism, which, he later said, would have killed him. He explained to a reporter: "In the world we live in, compulsive perfectionists finish last. You have to be Lawrence Welk or, on another level, Irving Berlin, and write the same kind of music over and over again. I'm not able to do that, and I have taken the clarinet as far as anyone can possibly go. To continue playing would be a disservice." He spent the rest of the 1950s living in Europe.

In 1983, after years of prodding by Williard Alexander, the 73-year-old Shaw organized a band and selected clarinetist Dick Johnson as bandleader and soloist. The 58-year-old Johnson, an accomplished woodwind and saxophonist and native of Brockton, Massachusetts, was no stranger to jazz having recorded numerous albums of his own and had idolized Shaw's playing throughout his life. Shaw's music library, which was the product of his almost 20 years of activity in the music business, contained numerous arrangements of monumental status of popular music in addition to many original big band jazz compositions of the era. It was a collection of music arranged by some of the foremost composer/arrangers of the period, much of which was sketched out by Shaw himself and filled in and completed by his orchestrator/arranger collaborators, among them Jerry Gray, William Grant Still, Lennie Hayton, Ray Conniff, Eddie Sauter, and Jimmy Mundy, among others. Shaw rehearsed his new band, (based out of Boston, Massachusetts), and the band made its official debut on New Year's Eve 1984 at the Glen Island Casino in New Rochelle, New York, the same launching pad for many bands of the swing era decades earlier, when Shaw and his bands were in their prime. Shaw appeared with the band throughout its first few years, limiting his role to being its conductor and front man, while leaving the clarinet playing duties to Johnson. In 1985, another week-long series of strenuous rehearsals followed during which Shaw added more repertoire, including many arrangements and compositions that were from the later years of his career Shaw had never recorded. By 1987 though, Shaw was no longer touring with the band, quietly content that Johnson and the band kept true to Shaw's band spirit and vision. He would, however, show up on occasion "just to hear how things sounded".

=== Films and television ===
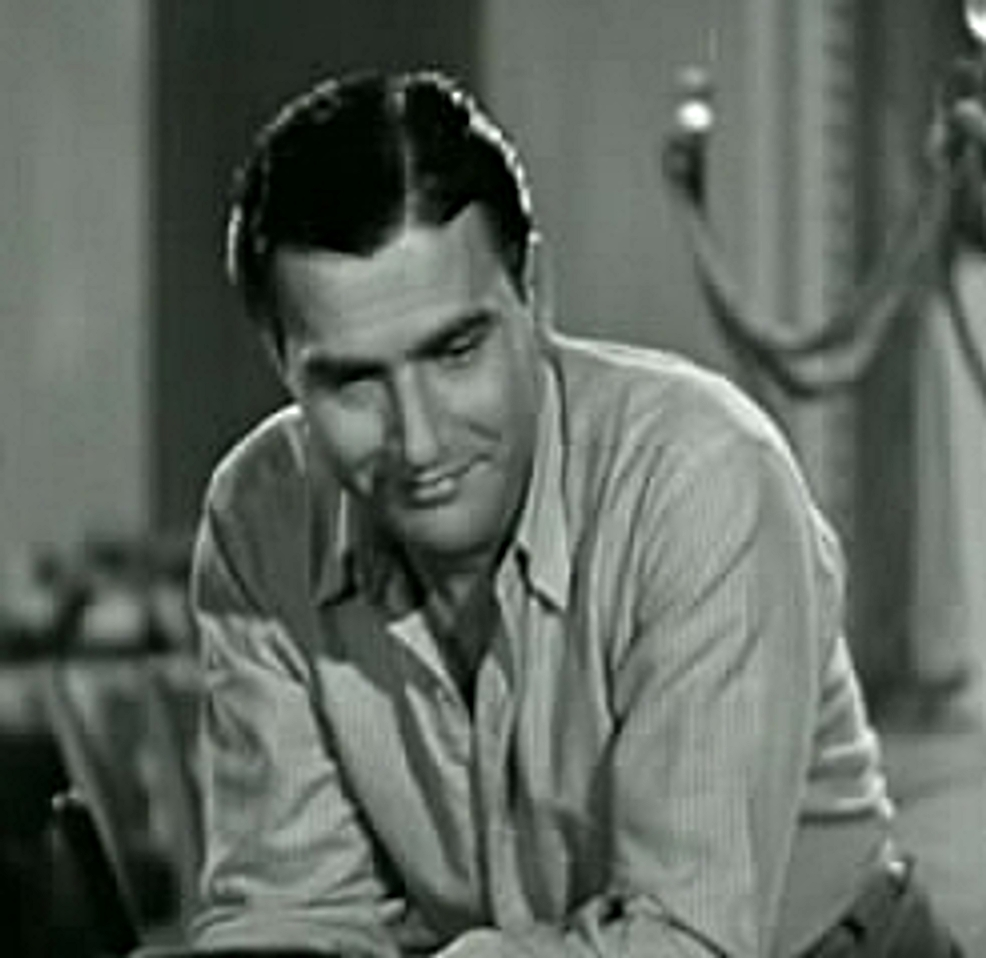
Shaw in Second Chorus (1940)

Shaw made several musical shorts in 1939 for Vitaphone and Paramount Pictures. He portrayed himself in the Fred Astaire film, Second Chorus (1940), which featured Shaw and his orchestra playing Concerto for Clarinet, and his 1940–41 Hollywood period Star Dust band can be heard throughout the soundtrack. The film garnered him two Oscar nominations for Best Score and Best Song ("Love of My Life"). He collaborated on the love song "If It's You", sung by Tony Martin in the Marx Brothers' film The Big Store (1941). On March 2, 1950, he was the mystery guest on the fifth episode of What's My Line? and on August 31, 1952, was part of the panel. During the 1970s he made appearances on The Mike Douglas Show and The Tonight Show with Johnny Carson.

Many of his recordings have been used in motion pictures. His 1940 recording of "Stardust" was used in its entirety in the closing credits of the film The Man Who Fell to Earth. Martin Scorsese also used the Shaw theme song, "Nightmare", in his Academy Award-winning Howard Hughes biopic, The Aviator.

Canadian filmmaker Brigitte Berman interviewed Hoagy Carmichael, Doc Cheatham, and others including Shaw for her documentary film, Bix: Ain't None of Them Play Like Him Yet (1981) about Bix Beiderbecke, and afterward she went on to create an Academy Award-winning documentary, Artie Shaw: Time Is All You've Got (1985), featuring extensive interviews with Shaw, Buddy Rich, Mel Tormé, Helen Forrest, and other musicians, in addition to Shaw's eighth wife, actress Evelyn Keyes. The documentary ends with Shaw rehearsing his new band with co-leader Johnson present and rolls to credits perhaps quite fittingly with the band taking a final segue to Shaw's theme song Nightmare. In 2000, filmmaker Ken Burns interviewed Shaw at his home for his PBS documentary/miniseries Jazz where Shaw appears in multiple segments. His last major interview was in 2003, when he was interviewed by Russell Davies for the BBC Television documentary, Artie Shaw – Quest for Perfection. The documentary includes interviews with surviving members of his original bands, Johnson, and other music industry professionals.

== Personal life ==
A self-proclaimed "very difficult man," Shaw was married eight times. Two marriages were annulled; the others ended in divorce: Jane Cairns (1932–33; annulled); Margaret Allen (1934–37); actress Lana Turner (1940); Betty Kern, the daughter of songwriter Jerome Kern (1942–43); actress Ava Gardner (1945–46); Forever Amber author Kathleen Winsor (1946–48; annulled); actress Doris Dowling (1952–56), and actress Evelyn Keyes (1957–85). He had two sons, Steven Kern (with Betty Kern) and Jonathan Shaw (with Doris Dowling). Both Lana Turner and Ava Gardner later described Shaw as being extremely emotionally abusive. He often publicly threatened his wives, promising to "teach them a lesson later on" if they did not "shut their yapper." His controlling nature and incessant verbal abuse drove Turner to have a nervous breakdown, soon after which she divorced him. In 1940, before eloping with Lana Turner, Shaw briefly dated actresses Betty Grable and Judy Garland and, according to Tom Nolan's biography, had an affair with Lena Horne.

Apart from his interest in music, Shaw had a tremendous intellect and almost insatiable thirst for intellectual knowledge and literature. During his self-imposed "sabbaticals" from the music business, his interests included studying advanced mathematics, as cited in Karl Sabbagh's The Riemann Hypothesis.

In 1946, Shaw was present at a meeting of the Independent Citizens' Committee of the Arts, Sciences and Professions. Olivia de Havilland and Ronald Reagan, part of a core group of actors and artists who were trying to sway the organization away from Communism, presented an anti-Communist declaration which, if signed, was set to run in newspapers. There was bedlam as many rose to champion the communist cause, and Shaw began praising the democratic standards of the Soviet constitution. In 1953, Shaw was called to testify before the House Un-American Activities Committee for his leftist activities. The committee was investigating a peace activist organization, the World Peace Council.

Shaw was also a precision marksman, ranking fourth in the United States in 1962, and an expert fly fisherman. In his later years, Shaw lived and wrote in the Newbury Park section of Thousand Oaks, California.

== Death and estate ==
Shaw died on December 30, 2004, aged 94. According to his publicist, he had been "in ill health for some time, but I don't know the specific cause of death." Shaw had been diabetic since the 1980s.

In 2005, Shaw's eighth wife, actress Evelyn Keyes, filed suit, seeking one-half of Shaw's estate, pursuant to a contract to make a will between them. In July 2006, a Ventura, California, jury unanimously held that Keyes was entitled to almost one-half of Shaw's estate, or $1,420,000.

== Awards and honors ==
In 1980, Shaw donated his papers, most of which amounted to his music library of over 700 scores and parts and approximately 1,000 pieces of sheet music, to Boston University. In 1991, the collection was transferred to the School of Music of the University of Arizona in Tucson. In 2004, he received a Grammy Lifetime Achievement Award.

In 1938, DownBeat magazine readers voted Artie Shaw's the best swing band.

In response to Benny Goodman's nickname, the "King of Swing," Shaw's fans dubbed him the "King of the Clarinet." He felt the titles should be reversed. "Benny Goodman played clarinet. I played music," he said.

Longtime Duke Ellington clarinetist Barney Bigard cited Shaw as his favorite clarinet player.

== Selected discography ==
Year	Title	Peak pos.
Year	Title	US
1936	There's Frost On The Moon (Brunswick)	10
1937	All God's Chillun Got Rhythm (Brunswick or Vocalion)	15
1937	Free Wheeling (Vocalion)	13
1937	Love Is Good For Anything That Ails You	20
1937	Love And Learn (Brunswick)	11
1938	Back Bay Shuffle (Bluebird)	8
1938	Begin The Beguine (Bluebird), remaining songs, Bluebird, except as noted	1
1938	Deep In A Dream	3
1938	Goodnight, Angel	2
1938	I Have Eyes	10
1938	Indian Love Call	6
1938	Let 'Er Go	12
1938	Nightmare	7
1938	One Song	15
1938	They Say	1
1939	Between A Kiss And A Sigh	13
1939	Comes Love	4
1939	Day In, Day Out	11
1939	Deep Purple	17
1939	Delightful Delirium	15
1939	I Poured My Heart Into A Song	4
1939	Jungle Drums	15
1939	Many Dreams Ago	11
1939	Melancholy Mood	8
1939	Pastel Blue	12
1939	Thanks For Everything	1
1939	Traffic Jam	9
1939	What Is This Thing Called Love	15
1939	When Winter Comes	6
1939	You Grow Sweeter As The Years Go By	15
1940	All The Things You Are	8
1940	Old, Old Castle In Scotland	25
1940	Frenesi	1
1940	Adios, Mariquita Linda	20
1940	The Blues, Pt. 1 & 2	14
1941	Star Dust	6
1941	Summit Ridge Drive	10
1941	Concerto For Clarinet, Pt. 1 & 2	10
1941	Dancing In The Dark	9
1941	Blues In The Night	10
1944	It Had To Be You	10
1945	Ac-Cent-Tchu-Ate The Positive (Victor)	5
1946	I Got The Sun In The Morning (Musicraft)	17

== Bibliography ==
- Tom Nolan, Artie Shaw, King of the Clarinet: His Life and Times (W. W. Norton, New York, 2011).
- John White, Artie Shaw: His Life and Music (Bloomsbury Academic, London, 2004).
- Vladimir Simosko, Artie Shaw: A Musical Biography and Discography (Scarecrow Press, Lanham, MD, 2000).
