= Billy Berg's =

Jazz club in Hollywood, California (1940s)

Coordinates: 34.0961°N 118.3264°W

- Interactive map of Billy Berg's
- Address: 1356 North Vine Street; Los Angeles; United States
- Location: Hollywood
- Owner: Billy Berg
- Type: Jazz club

Billy Berg's was a jazz club located at 1356 North Vine Street in Hollywood.

== History ==
Berg (d. 1962) had owned several other Hollywood jazz clubs prior to opening his Vine Street location. These included the Capri Club (Pico and La Cienega), the Trouville (Beverly and Fairfax), and the Swing Club (Hollywood and Las Palmas). Billy Berg's was noted as one of the first integrated jazz clubs in Hollywood.

The Vine Street club was most noted for booking the Dizzy Gillespie Quintet, an engagement that lasted from Monday, 10 December 1945 to Monday, 4 February 1946. This was the first appearance for both Gillespie and Charlie Parker on the west coast. Along with Gillespie and Parker, the quintet was composed of Al Haig on piano, Ray Brown on bass, and Stan Levey on drums. Milt Jackson was added to the quintet due to Parker's unreliable attendance. On the first night of the engagement Parker did not take to the stage until late in the second set, making his way through the audience while playing "Cherokee." Contrary to what was shown in the film Bird, Parker had been in the back of the club eating the club's specialty Mexican food for the first part of the concert. Although the engagement between Berg's and Dizzy Gillespie was not commercially successful, it advanced the career of Charlie Parker and brought more attention to the bebop genre.

Today, the original building still stands at the corner of Vine Street and De Longpre Avenue, and is currently named The Parker Room, in honor of Charlie Parker.

== Live recordings ==
One recording exists of the Gillespie band (with Lucky Thompson added) at Billy Berg's. "Salt Peanuts" was recorded for a WEAF radio broadcast on 24 January 1946.
