= Spud Murphy =

American jazz musician (1908–2005)

Miko Stephanovic (August 19, 1908 – August 5, 2005), better known as Lyle "Spud" Murphy, was an American jazz multi-instrumentalist, bandleader, and arranger. He studied clarinet and trumpet, and has been recorded playing the oboe, among other jazz instruments.

== Early life ==
Born Miko Stephanovic to parents in Berlin, Germany, Murphy grew up in Salt Lake City, Utah, where he took the name of a childhood friend.

== Music career ==
Murphy studied clarinet and saxophone when young, and took trumpet lessons from Red Nichols' father. Murphy worked with Jimmy Joy in 1927–28 and with Ross Gorman and Slim Lamar in 1928. He worked in the early 1930s as a saxophonist and arranger for Austin Wylie, Jan Garber, Mal Hallett, and Joe Haymes, then became a staff arranger for Benny Goodman from 1935–1937. During this time, he also contributed arrangements for the Casa Loma Orchestra, Isham Jones, and Les Brown.

From 1937–1940 Murphy led a big band, and from 1938–39 recorded for Decca Records and Bluebird Records. In the 1940s, he moved to Los Angeles, where he was introduced to the film industry, in addition to writing and teaching the 1200-page System of Horizontal Composition (a.k.a. "Equal Interval System"). He recorded two jazz albums in the 1950s, but his later career was focused on classical and film music. In the film world, Murphy was staff composer and arranger for Columbia Pictures under Morris Stoloff. Between 1942 and 1959, he worked on 90 films and shorts as part of the music department.

In addition to being a talented composer, arranger, and musician, Murphy became a renowned educator, writing over 26 books on various topics in music, such as instrumental techniques and music theory. His crowning achievement was his 12-volume course in composing, arranging, and orchestration for the professional musician titled The Equal Interval System. He taught mostly in Los Angeles but also a special course at the Mount Royal Conservatory in Calgary, Canada. He was an instructor who was voted Educator of the Year in 1990 by the Los Angeles Jazz Society. Murphy died in Los Angeles two weeks short of his 97th birthday. In 2003, orchestra leader Dean Mora, a friend of Murphy, recorded some two dozen of his arrangements in a tribute CD, Goblin Market.

== Equal Interval System (EIS) ==
The Equal Interval System (EIS) (also known as the System of Horizontal Composition based on Equal Intervals) is a modern system of music composition developed by Murphy over a lifetime of research. Several courses based upon the EIS system are taught at Pasadena City College. Many notable composers and arrangers have been students of the Equal Interval System, such as Tom Chase, Gerald Wiggins, Jimmie Haskell, Richard Firth, Mary Ekler, David Blumberg, Steve Marston, Clair Marlo, Dan Sawyer, Don Novello, Don Peake, Danny Pelfrey, Craig Sharmat, Scott Paige, James L. Venable, Marcos Valle and Oscar Peterson.

== Discography ==
- Four Saxophones in Twelve Tones (GNP Crescendo, 1955)
- New Orbits in Sound (GNP Crescendo, 1955–57)
- Gone with the Woodwinds (Contemporary, 1955)
- 12-Tone Compositions and Arrangements by Lyle Murphy - later released as Gone With The Woodwinds! (Contemporary, recorded 1955, released 1957)

== Sources ==
- Dean Mora's Modern Rhythmists, Goblin Market (Mr. Ace Records)
- Scott Yanow, Spud Murphy Allmusic
