= Red Callender =

American string bass and tuba player (1916–1992)

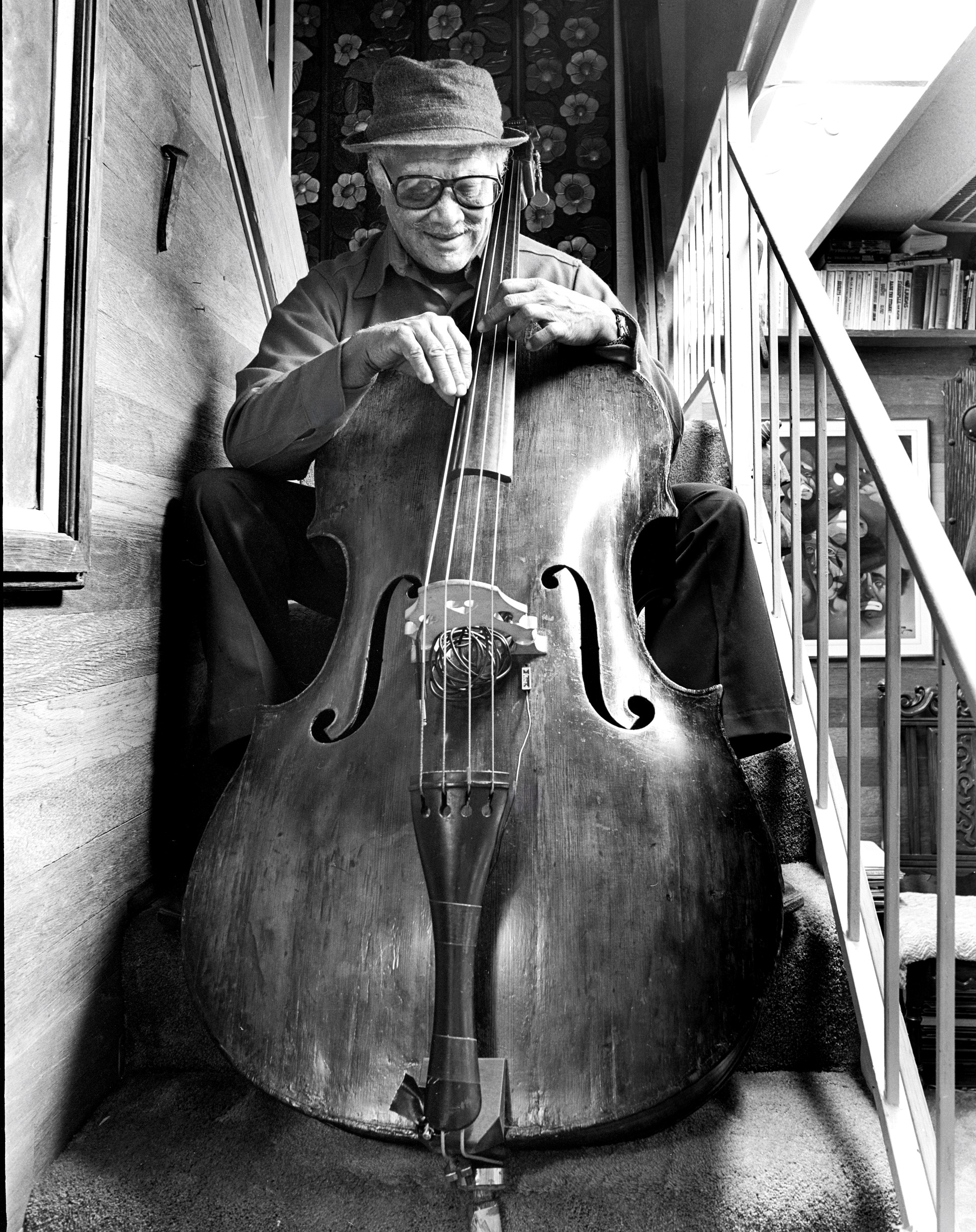

Background information
- Born: George Sylvester Callender; March 6, 1916; Haynesville, Virginia, U.S.
- Died: March 8, 1992 (aged 76) Saugus, California, U.S.
- Genres: Jazz
- Occupation: Musician
- Instruments: Double bass, tuba
- Formerly of: The Wrecking Crew

George Sylvester "Red" Callender (March 6, 1916 – March 8, 1992) was an American string bass and tuba player. He is perhaps best known as a jazz musician, but worked with an array of pop, rock and vocal acts as a member of The Wrecking Crew, a group of first-call session musicians in Los Angeles. Callender also co-wrote the 1959 top-10 hit "Primrose Lane".

== Biography ==
Callender was born in Haynesville, Virginia, United States. In the early 1940s, he played in the Lester and Lee Young band, and then formed his own trio. In the 1940s, Callender recorded with Nat King Cole, Erroll Garner, Charlie Parker, Wardell Gray, Dexter Gordon, Uffe Baadh and many others. After a period spent leading a trio in Hawaii, Callender returned to Los Angeles, becoming one of the first black musicians to work regularly in the commercial studios, including backing singer Linda Hayes on two singles. He made his recording debut at 19 with Louis Armstrong's band. However, he later turned down offers to work with Duke Ellington's Orchestra and the Louis Armstrong All-Stars.

On his 1957 Crown LP Speaks Low, Callender was one of the earliest modern jazz tuba soloists. Keeping busy up until his death, some of the highlights of the bassist's later career include recording with Art Tatum and Jo Jones (1955–1956) for the Tatum Group, playing with Charles Mingus at the 1964 Monterey Jazz Festival, working with James Newton's avant-garde woodwind quintet (on tuba), and performing as a regular member of the Cheatham's Sweet Baby Blues Band. He also reached the top of the UK Singles Chart as a member of B. Bumble and the Stingers. In November 1964, he was introduced and highlighted in performance with entertainer Danny Kaye, in a duet on the Fred Astaire introduced George and Ira Gershwin song, "Slap That Bass", for Kaye's CBS-TV variety show.

Callender died of thyroid cancer at his home in Saugus, California, at the age of 76.

== Discography ==
=== As leader ===
- 1956: Swingin' Suite (Modern)
- 1957: Red Callender Speaks Low (Crown)
- 1958: The Lowest (MetroJazz)
- 1973: Basin Street Brass (Legend)
- 1984: Night Mist Blues (Hemisphere)
- ¿? : Red Callender Sextet & Fourtette

=== As sideman ===
With Gregg Allman Band

- Playin' Up a Storm (Capricorn Records, 1977)

With Patti Austin

- The Real Me (Qwest Records, 1988)

With The Association

- Birthday (Warner Bros., 1968)

With Frankie Avalon

- ...And Now About Mr. Avalon (Chancellor, 1961)

With The Beach Boys

- The Beach Boys' Christmas Album (Capitol, 1964)

With Harry Belafonte

- Belafonte Sings the Blues (RCA Victor, 1959)

With Louis Bellson

- Big Band Jazz from the Summit (Roulette, 1962)

With Johnny Burnette

- Roses Are Red (Liberty, 1962)

With Judy Carmichael

- Two Handed Stride (Progressive, 1982)
- Pearls (Jazzology, 1985)

With Benny Carter

- Cosmopolite (Norgran, 1954)

With John Carter

- Dauwhe (Black Saint, 1982)

With Roy Clark

- Stringing Along with the Blues (Capitol, 1966)

With Rosemary Clooney

- That Travelin' Two-Beat (Capitol, 1965)

With Nat King Cole

- Wild Is Love (Capitol, 1960)
- Let's Face the Music! (Capitol, 1964)

With Buddy Collette

- Man of Many Parts (Contemporary, 1956)
- Jazz Loves Paris (Speciality, 1958)
- Porgy & Bess (Interlude, 1959)

With Ry Cooder

- Paradise and Lunch (Reprise Records, 1974)
- Chicken Skin Music (Reprise Records, 1976)
- Jazz (Warner Bros. Records, 1978)

With Sam Cooke

- Twistin' the Night Away (RCA Victor, 1962)
- Mr. Soul (RCA Victor, 1963)

With Bobby Darin

- Bobby Darin Sings Ray Charles (Atco, 1962)

With Willie Dixon

- Hidden Charms (Capitol, 1988)

With Donovan

- 7-Tease (Epic Records, 1974)

With Billy Eckstine

- Billy Eckstine's Imagination (EmArcy, 1958)
- Once More With Feeling (Roulette, 1960)

With Maynard Ferguson

- Maynard Ferguson Octet (EmArcy, 1955)

With Dizzy Gillespie

- The New Continent (Limelight, 1962)

With Johnny Hodges

- In a Tender Mood (Norgran, 1955)
- The Blues (Norgran, 1955)

With Paul Horn

- Plenty of Horn (Dot, 1958)
- Jazz Suite on the Mass Texts (RCA Victor, 1965) with Lalo Schifrin

With Plas Johnson

- This Must Be the Plas (Capitol Records, 1959)

With B. B. King

- Blues in My Heart (Crown Records, 1962)
- L.A. Midnight (ABC Records, 1972)

With Peggy Lee

- Jump for Joy (Capitol Records, 1959)

With Rickie Lee Jones

- Rickie Lee Jones (Warner Bros. Records, 1979)

With Dean Martin

- A Winter Romance (Capitol, 1959)

With Kate & Anna McGarrigle

- Kate & Anna McGarrigle (Warner Bros. Records, 1976)

With The Monkees

- Instant Replay (Colgems, 1969)

With Maria Muldaur

- Waitress in a Donut Shop (Reprise Records, 1974)

With Randy Newman

- Good Old Boys (Reprise Records, 1974)

With Gene Parsons

- Kindling (Warner Bros. Records, 1973)

With Pete Rugolo

- Rugolo Plays Kenton (EmArcy, 1958)
- The Original Music of Thriller (Time, 1961)

With Mavis Rivers and Shorty Rogers

- Mavis Meets Shorty (Riverside, 1963)

With Art Tatum

- The Art Tatum - Ben Webster Quartet (Verve, 1958)
- Presenting... The Art Tatum Trio (with Jo Jones, Verve, 1957)

With James Taylor

- In the Pocket (Rhino Records, 1976)
- JT (Columbia Records, 1977)

With Mel Tormé

- ¡Olé Tormé! (Verve, 1959)
- Mel Tormé Swings Shubert Alley (Verve, 1960)
- Swingin' on the Moon (Verve, 1960)

With Gerald Wilson

- Calafia (Trend, 1985)

With Betty Wright

- Wright Back At You (Epic Records, 1983)

== Bibliography ==
- Callender, Red; Cohen, Elaine (1985). Unfinished Dream: The Musical World of Red Callender. Introduction by Stanley Dance. Quartet Books. ISBN 978-0704325074.
