= Gil Fuller =

American jazz musician (1920–1994)

Walter Gilbert "Gil" Fuller (April 14, 1920, Los Angeles, California – May 26, 1994, San Diego, California) was an American jazz arranger. He is no relation to the jazz trumpeter and vocalist Walter "Rosetta" Fuller.

In the 1930s and 1940s, Fuller did extensive work writing and arranging for bandleaders such as Les Hite, Jimmie Lunceford, Billy Eckstine, and Tiny Bradshaw; he also worked with Benny Carter, Benny Goodman, Woody Herman, Count Basie, Machito, and Tito Puente. After World War II, he found himself increasingly in demand as a bebop arranger, along with fellow modern arrangers Tadd Dameron, Gil Evans, and George Russell. Fuller's work with Dizzy Gillespie was of particular note, yielding the tunes "Manteca", "Swedish Suite", "Tin Tin Deo", and "One Bass Hit". He is the composer of the jazz standard ballad "I Waited For You", co-credited with Dizzy Gillespie.

Fuller started his own publishing company in 1957, and while he continued to work with some jazz musicians (including Stan Kenton in 1955 and again in the 1960s), he also branched out into film music and pop (with Ray Charles, among others).

== Discography ==
- Gil Fuller and his Orchestra (Vogue, 1949)
- Gil Fuller & the Monterey Jazz Festival Orchestra featuring Dizzy Gillespie (Pacific Jazz, 1965)
- Night Flight (Pacific Jazz, 1965)

== See also ==
- List of jazz arrangers
