= Nancy Wilson discography =

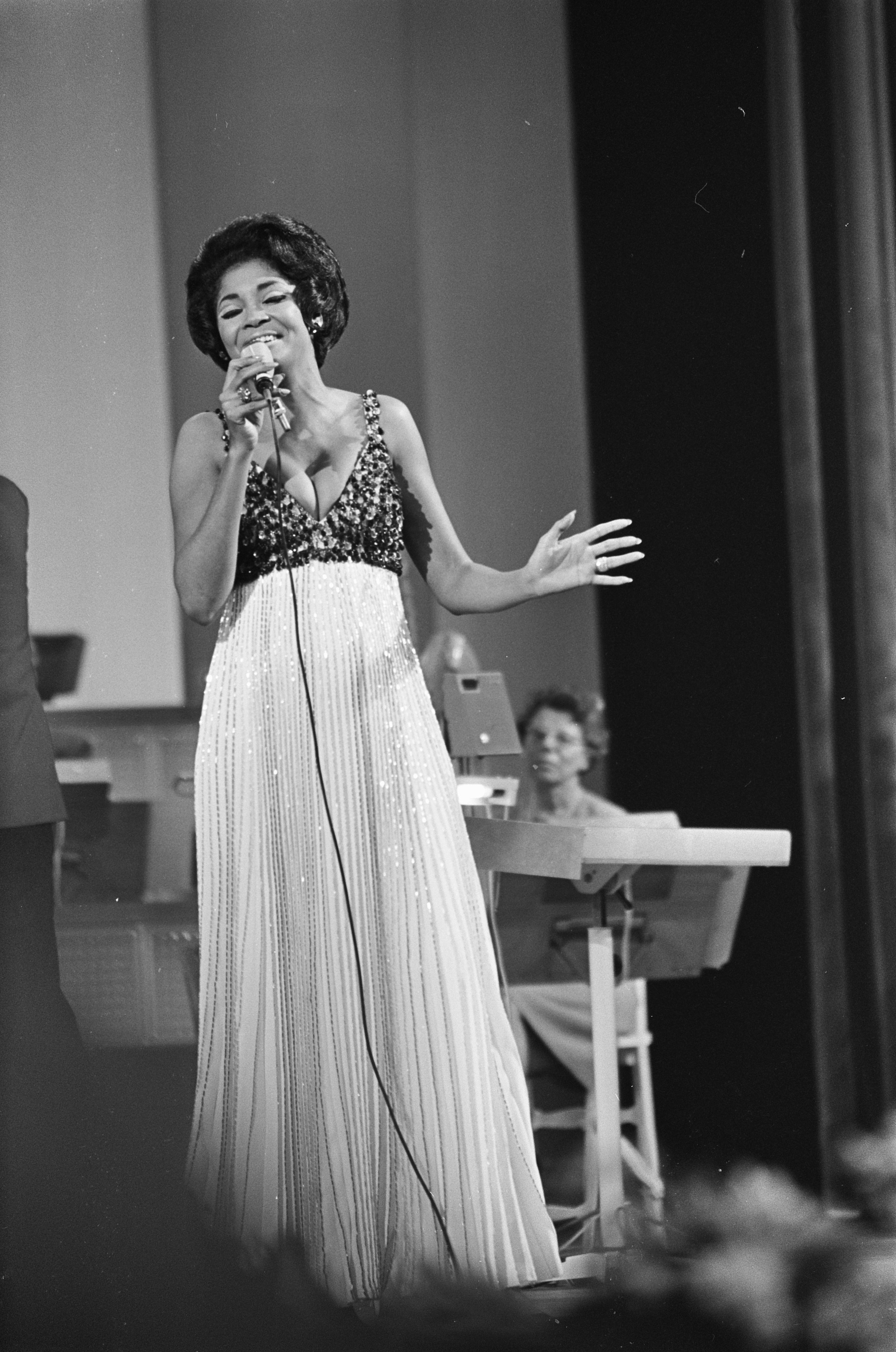
- Nancy Wilson in performance, 1968.
- Studio albums: 52
- Live albums: 3
- Compilation albums: 27
- Singles: 57
- Other charted songs: 1
- Promotional singles: 9
- Box sets: 1

The discography of American singer, Nancy Wilson, contains 52 studio albums, 27 compilation albums, three live albums, one box set, 57 singles, nine promotional singles and one other charting song. Wilson's debut studio album was issued by Capitol Records in April 1960 called Like in Love. Her first single to chart was 1961's "Save Your Love for Me", a duet with The Cannoball Adderley Quartet that reached number 11 on the US R&B songs chart. Wilson's first album to make the US Billboard 200 chart was 1962's Hello Young Lovers, peaking at number 49. The 1963 studio LP, Yesterday's Love Songs/Today's Blues, was her highest-charting album up to that point, reaching number four in the US. In 1964, "(You Don't Know) How Glad I Am", became Wilson's highest-peaking single, reaching number 11 on the US Hot 100, number two on the US adult contemporary chart and number six in Canada. Its corresponding LP, How Glad I Am, reached number four in the US.

Capitol issued several albums per-year by Wilson during the 1960s, all of which reached positions on the US Billboard 200 and the US Billboard R&B albums surveys. Studio LP's that reached the top ten on the R&B chart included Today My Way (1965), Gentle Is My Love (1965), A Touch of Today (1966), Tender Loving Care (1966), Nancy – Naturally (1966), Just for Now (1967), Lush Life (1967), Easy (1968), and Now I'm a Woman (1970). Ten singles spawned from the LP's made positions on the US Hot 100, Adult Contemporary and R&B charts. Among them was the top ten adult contemporary song "Uptight (Everything's Alright)" (1966), the top 20 R&B song "Face It Girl It's Over" (1968) and her last-charting Hot 100 song "Now I'm a Woman" (1970). Wilson's first live album was also issued during this period called The Nancy Wilson Show! (1965), which made positions on the US Billboard 200 and R&B charts.

Capitol released 11 more studio albums by Wilson through the 1970s, six of which made the Billboard 200. Despite making chart appearances, Wilson's LP's made progressively-lower peaking positions here, such as the number 185 But Beautiful (1971) or the number 193 I've Never Been to Me (1977). Four of them made the R&B chart, including the top 20 LP's All in Love Is Fair (1974) and Come Get to This (1975). Nine singles made the US R&B chart through 1979, including the top ten "You're as Right as Rain" (1974). Wilson released eight studio albums with Columbia Records between 1984 and 1997. This included the Ramsey Lewis collaboration, The Two of Us (1984) and Love, Nancy (1994). The latter was Wilson's first to reach the top ten of the US Jazz Albums chart. The MCG Jazz and Narada Jazz labels issued Wilson's final studio albums, concluding with the top ten album, Turned to Blue (2007).

== Albums ==
=== Studio albums ===
List of albums, with selected chart positions, showing other relevant details
Title	Album details	Peak chart positions		
Title	Album details	US	US Jazz	US R&B
Like in Love	Released: April 1960; Label: Capitol; Formats: LP	—	—	—
Something Wonderful	Released: October 1960; Label: Capitol; Formats: LP	—	—	—
The Swingin's Mutual! (with The George Shearing Quintet)	Released: March 1961; Label: Capitol; Formats: LP	—	—	—
Nancy Wilson/Cannonball Adderley (with Cannonball Adderley)	Released: February 1962; Label: Capitol; Formats: LP	—	—	—
Hello Young Lovers	Released: July 1962; Label: Capitol; Formats: LP	49	—	—
Broadway – My Way	Released: March 1963; Label: Capitol; Formats: LP	18	—	—
Hollywood – My Way	Released: July 1963; Label: Capitol; Formats: LP	11	—	—
Yesterday's Love Songs/Today's Blues	Released: December 1963; Label: Capitol; Formats: LP	4	—	—
Today, Tomorrow, Forever	Released: May 1964; Label: Capitol; Formats: LP	10	—	—
How Glad I Am	Released: August 1964; Label: Capitol; Formats: LP	4	—	—
Today My Way	Released: May 1965; Label: Capitol; Formats: LP	7	—	2
Gentle Is My Love	Released: July 1965; Label: Capitol; Formats: LP	17	—	7
From Broadway with Love	Released: January 1966; Label: Capitol; Formats: LP	44	—	—
A Touch of Today	Released: May 1966; Label: Capitol; Formats: LP	15	—	4
Tender Loving Care	Released: July 1966; Label: Capitol; Formats: LP	35	—	3
Nancy – Naturally	Released: December 1966; Label: Capitol; Formats: LP	35	—	4
Just for Now	Released: May 1967; Label: Capitol; Formats: LP	40	—	8
Lush Life	Released: August 1967; Label: Capitol; Formats: LP	46	—	8
Welcome to My Love	Released: January 1968; Label: Capitol; Formats: LP	115	—	26
Easy	Released: May 1968; Label: Capitol; Formats: LP	51	—	5
The Sound of Nancy Wilson	Released: September 1968; Label: Capitol; Formats: LP	122	—	20
Nancy	Released: January 1969; Label: Capitol; Formats: LP	117	—	38
Son of a Preacher Man	Released: June 1969; Label: Capitol; Formats: LP	122	—	20
Hurt So Bad	Released: September 1969; Label: Capitol; Formats: LP	92	—	19
Can't Take My Eyes Off You	Released: February 1970; Label: Capitol; Formats: LP	155	—	38
Now I'm a Woman	Released: July 1970; Label: Capitol; Formats: LP	54	—	5
But Beautiful	Released: 1971; Label: Capitol; Formats: LP	185	—	—
Kaleidoscope	Released: November 1971; Label: Capitol; Formats: LP	151	—	—
I Know I Love Him	Released: February 1973; Label: Capitol; Formats: LP	—	—	—
All in Love Is Fair	Released: August 1974; Label: Capitol; Formats: LP	97	—	11
Come Get to This	Released: June 1975; Label: Capitol; Formats: LP	119	—	14
This Mother's Daughter	Released: June 1976; Label: Capitol; Formats: LP	126	—	26
I've Never Been to Me	Released: June 1977; Label: Capitol; Formats: LP	193	—	42
Music on My Mind	Released: June 1978; Label: Capitol; Formats: LP	—	—	—
Life, Love and Harmony	Released: June 1979; Label: Capitol; Formats: LP	—	—	—
Take My Love	Released: March 1980; Label: Capitol; Formats: LP	—	—	—
What's New (with The Great Jazz Trio)	Released: September 1982; Label: Eastworld/Toshiba; Formats: LP, CD	—	—	—
I'll Be a Song	Released: August 1983; Label: Interface/Denon; Formats: LP, CD, cassette	—	—	—
Godsend	Released: June 21, 1984; Label: Interface/Denon; Formats: LP, CD	—	—	—
The Two of Us (with Ramsey Lewis)	Released: September 1984; Label: Columbia; Formats: LP, cassette, CD	144	—	42
Keep You Satisfied	Released: April 1985; Label: Columbia/Interface; Formats:LP, cassette, CD	—	—	—
Forbidden Lover	Released: April 1987; Label: Columbia; Formats:LP, cassette, CD	—	—	—
Nancy Now!	Released: November 1988; Label: Columbia; Formats:LP, cassette, CD	—	—	—
A Lady with a Song	Released: February 1990; Label: Columbia; Formats: LP, cassette, CD	—	—	68
With My Lover Beside Me	Released: October 1991; Label: Columbia; Formats: Cassette, CD	—	—	—
Love, Nancy	Released: May 1994; Label: Columbia; Formats: Cassette, CD	—	6	63
If I Had My Way	Released: July 15, 1997; Label: Columbia; Formats: Cassette, CD	—	6	—
A Nancy Wilson Christmas	Released: September 25, 2001; Label: MCG Jazz; Formats: CD	—	5	—
Meant to Be (with Ramsey Lewis)	Released: February 26, 2002; Label: Narada Jazz; Formats: CD	—	3	—
Simple Pleasures (with Ramsey Lewis)	Released: July 22, 2003; Label: Narada Jazz; Formats: CD	—	9	—
R.S.V.P. (Rare Songs, Very Personal)	Released: August 24, 2004; Label: MCG Jazz; Formats: CD	—	7	—
Turned to Blue	Released: August 22, 2006; Label: MCG Jazz; Formats: CD	—	7	—
"—" denotes a recording that did not chart or was not released in that territory.

=== Compilation albums ===
List of albums, with selected chart positions, showing other relevant details
Title	Album details	Peak chart positions	
Title	Album details	US	US R&B
The Best of Nancy Wilson	Released: 1968; Label: Capitol; Formats: LP	145	23
Close-Up	Released: 1969; Label: Capitol; Formats: LP	193	—
The Right to Love	Released: 1970; Label: Capitol; Formats: LP	185	—
Nancy Wilson	Released: 1971; Label: Capitol; Formats: LP	—	—
Hacerlo Contigo	Released: 1972; Label: Capitol; Formats: LP	—	—
The Very Best of Nancy Wilson	Released: 1974; Label: Capitol; Formats: LP	—	—
Nancy Wilson	Released: 1974; Label: Capitol; Formats: LP	—	—
Best 20	Released: 1976; Label: Capitol; Formats: LP	—	—
Best 20	Released: 1977; Label: Capitol; Formats: LP	—	—
Lo Mejor de Nancy Wilson	Released: 1977; Label: Capitol; Formats: LP	—	—
Elegidos	Released: 1979; Label: Capitol; Formats: LP	—	—
20 Golden Greats	Released: 1982; Label: Capitol; Formats: LP, CD	—	—
Nancy Wilson's Greatest Hits	Released: 1986; Label: Capitol Special Markets; Formats: CD, cassette	—	—
The Best of the Capitol Years	Released: 1992; Label: Capitol; Formats: CD	—	—
Spotlight on...Nancy Wilson	Released: May 3, 1995; Label: Capitol; Formats: CD	—	—
The Best of Nancy Wilson: The Jazz and Blues Sessions	Released: November 26, 1996; Label: Capitol Jazz; Formats: CD	—	—
Ballads, Blues & Big Bands: The Best Of Nancy Wilson	Released: November 26, 1996; Label: Capitol Jazz; Formats: CD	—	—
Day Dream	Released: 1996; Label: Capitol Jazz; Formats: CD	—	—
Outta Sight! Nancy Wilson Sings the Hits	Released: 1998; Label: EMI; Formats: CD	—	—
Greatest Hits	Released: September 7, 1999; Label: Columbia; Formats: CD, cassette	—	—
Anthology	Released: June 6, 2000; Label: Capitol; Formats: CD	—	—
The Ultimate Nancy Wilson	Released: November 5, 2001; Label: EMI; Formats: CD	—	—
Collection	Released: April 27, 2004; Label: EMI; Formats: CD	—	—
The Best of Nancy Wilson	Released: April 27, 2004; Label: EMI; Formats: CD	—	—
The Great American Songbook	Released: August 30, 2005; Label: Capitol Jazz; Formats: CD	—	—
Guess Who I Saw Today: Nancy Wilson Sings Songs of Lost Love	Released: August 30, 2005; Label: Capitol Jazz; Formats: CD	—	—
Save Your Love for Me: Nancy Wilson Sings the Great Blues Ballads	Released: August 30, 2005; Label: Capitol Jazz; Formats: CD	—	—
"—" denotes a recording that did not chart or was not released in that territory.

=== Live albums ===
List of albums, with selected chart positions, showing other relevant details
Title	Album details	Peak chart positions	
Title	Album details	US	US R&B
The Nancy Wilson Show!	Released: January 1965; Label: Capitol; Formats: LP	24	4
Echoes of an Era 2: The Concert (with Joe Henderson, Chick Corea, Stanley Clarke and Lenny White)	Released: April 7, 1982; Label: Elektra/Musician; Formats: LP	—	—
At My Best	Released: June 1981; Label: ASI; Formats: LP	—	—
"—" denotes a recording that did not chart or was not released in that territory.

=== Box sets ===
List of albums, showing all relevant details
Title	Album details
The Essence of Nancy Wilson: Four Decades of Music	Released: 2002; Label: Capitol; Formats: CD

== Singles ==
=== As lead artist ===
List of singles, with selected chart positions, showing other relevant details
Title	Year	Peak chart positions						Album
Title	Year	US	US AC	US R&B	AUS	CAN	CAN AC	Album
"The Seventh Son"	1961	—	—	—	—	—	—	—N/a
"Give Him Love"	1961	—	—	—	—	—	—	—N/a
"Guess Who I Saw Today"	1961	—	—	—	—	—	—	Something Wonderful
"Save Your Love for Me" (with Julian "Cannonball" Adderley Quartet)	1962	—	—	11	—	—	—	Nancy Wilson/Cannonball Adderley
"You Don't Know What Love Is"	1962	—	—	—	—	—	—	Hello Young Lovers
"You Can Have Him"	1963	—	—	—	—	—	—	Broadway My Way
"Tell Me the Truth"	1963	73	—	22	—	—	—	—N/a
"What Are You Doing New Years Eve"	1963	—	—	—	—	—	—	—N/a
"Don't Rain on My Parade"	1964	—	—	—	—	—	—	How Glad I Am
"(You Don't Know) How Glad I Am"	1964	11	2	45	76	6	—	How Glad I Am
"I Wanna Be with You"	1964	57	9	—	—	—	—	How Glad I Am
"And Satisfy"	1964	— (Note: "And Satisfy" did not enter the Hot 100, but peaked at number 6 on Bubbling Under Hot 100 Singles, which acts as a 25-song extension of the Hot 100.)	—	—	—	—	—	Today My Way
"Don't Come Running Back to Me"	1965	58	—	—	—	—	—	Today My Way
"Welcome, Welcome"	1965	— (Note: "Welcome, Welcome" did not enter the Hot 100, but peaked at number 25 on Bubbling Under Hot 100 Singles, which acts as a 25-song extension of the Hot 100.)	—	—	—	—	—	Today My Way
"Where Does That Leave Me"	1965	—	30	—	—	—	—	—N/a
"I'll Only Miss Him When I Think of Him"	1965	—	33	—	—	—	—	From Broadway with Love
"No One Else But You"	1965	—	—	—	—	—	—	A Touch of Today
"Rain Sometimes"	1966	—	—	—	—	—	—	Just for Now
"Uptight (Everything's Alright)"	1966	84	10	—	—	—	—	A Touch of Today
"That Special Way"	1966	—	—	—	—	—	—	—N/a
"I'll Make a Man of the Man"	1966	—	—	—	—	—	—	Just for Now
"In the Dark"	1967	—	—	—	—	—	—	Nancy Naturally
"Don't Look Over Your Shoulder"	1967	—	—	—	—	—	—	—N/a
"Ode to Billie Joe"	1967	—	—	—	—	—	—	Welcome to My Love
"Face It Girl, It's Over"	1968	29	28	15	—	37	—	Easy
"Peace of Mind"	1968	55	34	24	—	58	—	The Sound of Nancy Wilson
"In a Long White Room"	1968	— (Note: "In a Long White Room" did not enter the Hot 100, but peaked at number 17 on Bubbling Under Hot 100 Singles, which acts as a 25-song extension of the Hot 100.)	31	—	—	—	—	Nancy
"You'd Better Go"	1969	— (Note: "You'd Better Go" did not enter the Hot 100, but peaked at number 11 on Bubbling Under Hot 100 Singles, which acts as a 25-song extension of the Hot 100.)	—	44	—	—	—	Nancy
"Got It Together"	1969	— (Note: "Got It Together" did not enter the Hot 100, but peaked at number 14 on Bubbling Under Hot 100 Singles, which acts as a 25-song extension of the Hot 100.)	—	—	—	—	—	Son of a Preacher Man
"Can't Take My Eyes Off You"	1969	52	28	27	—	87	39	Hurt So Bad
"Waitin' for Charlie to Come Home"	1970	—	—	—	—	—	—	Can't Take My Eyes Off You
"This Girl Is a Woman Now"	1970	—	32	—	—	—	—	Can't Take My Eyes Off You
"Now I'm a Woman"	1970	93	—	41	—	—	—	Now I'm a Woman
"The Greatest Performance of My Life"	1971	—	—	—	—	—	—	Kaleidoscope
"We Can Make It Baby"	1973	—	—	—	—	—	—	I Know I Love Him
"Streetrunner"	1974	—	—	46	—	—	—	All in Love Is Fair
"You're as Right as Rain"	1974	—	—	10	—	87	—	All in Love Is Fair
"He Called Me Baby"	1975	—	—	74	—	—	—	Come Get to This
"Don't Let Be Lonely Tonight"	1975	—	—	54	—	—	—	Come Get to This
"Now"	1976	—	—	91	—	—	—	This Mother's Daughter
"In My Loneliness (When We Were One)"	1976	—	—	96	—	—	—	This Mother's Daughter
"I've Never Been to Me"	1977	—	—	47	—	—	—	I've Never Been to Me
"I'm Gonna Let Ya"	1978	—	—	94	—	—	—	Music on My Mind
"Life, Love and Harmony"	1979	—	—	83	—	—	—	Life, Love and Harmony
"Sunshine"	1979	—	—	—	—	—	—	Life, Love and Harmony
"Winter Green and Summer Blue"	1985	—	—	—	—	—	—	Keep You Satisfied
"Forbidden Lover" (featuring Carl Anderson)	1987	—	—	—	—	—	—	Forbidden Lover
"Quiet Fire"	1988	—	—	—	—	—	—	Nancy Now!
"Don't Ask My Neighbors"	1990	—	—	83	—	—	—	A Lady with a Song
"Do You Still Dream About Me"	1991	—	—	64	—	—	—	A Lady with a Song
"Epilogue" (with Barry Manilow)	1991	—	—	—	—	—	—	With My Lover Beside Me
"Love Won't Let Me Wait"	1994	—	—	65	—	—	—	Love, Nancy
"I Can't Make You Love Me"	1994	—	—	87	—	—	—	Love, Nancy
"Hello Like Before"	1997	—	—	—	—	—	—	If I Had My Way
"Sweet Love"	1997	—	—	—	—	—	—	If I Had My Way
"If I Had My Way"	1998	—	—	—	—	—	—	If I Had My Way
"Slippin' into Darkness" (with Ramsey Lewis)	2003	—	—	—	—	—	—	Simple Pleasures
"—" denotes a recording that did not chart or was not released in that territory.

=== Promotional singles ===
List of promotional singles, showing all relevant details
Title	Year	Album	Ref.
"Tonight"	1963	Broadway My Way	
"I Believe in You"	1963	Broadway My Way	
"Getting to Know You"	1963	Broadway My Way	
"The Sweetest Sounds"	1963	Broadway My Way	
"Loads of Love"	1963	Broadway My Way	
"Toys for Tots"	1965	—N/a	
"Fireworks"	1966	The Nancy Wilson Show!	
"In the Heat of the Night"	1967	Welcome to My Love	
"If I Could"	1988	Nancy Now!	

== Other charted songs ==
List of songs, with selected chart positions, showing other relevant details
Title	Year	Peak chart positions		Notes	Album
Title	Year	US AC	US R&B	Notes	Album
"You've Got Your Troubles"	1965	20	48	A Touch of Today	(Note: Released as the B-side to the single "Uptight (Everything's Alright)".)
