= Welcome to My Love =

Studio album by Nancy Wilson
- Released: January 1968
- Recorded: 1967
- Genre: Vocal jazz
- Length: 33:56
- Label: Capitol
- Producer: David Cavanaugh

Nancy Wilson chronology
Lush Life (1967)	Welcome to My Love (1968)	Easy (1968)

Professional ratings
Review scores
Source	Rating
Allmusic	4/5 stars
The Virgin Encyclopedia of Jazz	4/5 stars

Welcome to My Love is a 1968 studio album by Nancy Wilson, arranged and conducted by Oliver Nelson. The album received a positive-to-mixed critical reception, and reached US R&B and pop-oriented charts.

== Reception ==
Reviewing the album, Billboard stated that "Uptempo music is the forte of Miss Wilson's stylized deliveries and she sparkles on this LP," but "Miss Wilson's rendition of 'Ode to Billie Joe,' however, is completely inappropriate as she misses the entire purpose and beauty of the lyrics."

Stephen Cook at AllMusic said the album "offers a consistent selection of high-quality standards and strong contemporary material impressively set off by Oliver Nelson's soulfully urbane arrangements." Cook claims that "Wilson's smoky, whispered voice imparts just the right amount of tender drama here while Nelson's dark and restrained string charts keep things from getting syrupy," and he concludes by saying that Wilson "successfully straddled the jazz/soul divide and in the process produced one of her best albums of the 60's."

== Chart performance ==
The album debuted on Billboard magazine's Top LPs chart in the issue dated February 3, 1968, peaking at No. 115 during a seventeen-week run on the chart. It debuted on the Billboard Hot R&B LPs chart in the issue dated March 30, 1968, peaking at No. 26 during an eight-week run on it. The album debuted on Cashbox magazine's Top 100 Albums chart in the issue also dated January 27, 1968, peaking at No. 73 during a six-week run on the chart.

== Reissues ==
A 1970 reissue of the album was entitled For Once in My Life and did not include the track "It Never Entered My Mind." In 1994, Capitol released the album on compact disc with its original title and cover, along with an additional bonus track.

== Track listing ==
=== Side 1 ===
1. "In the Heat of the Night" (Alan Bergman, Marilyn Bergman, Quincy Jones) – 2:32
2. "May I Come In?" (Marvin Fisher, Jack Segal) – 2:35
3. "Angel Eyes" (Earl Brent, Matt Dennis) – 2:48
4. "It Never Entered My Mind" (Richard Rodgers, Lorenz Hart) – 2:49
5. "I'm Always Drunk In San Francisco (and I Don't Drink at All)" (Tommy Wolf) – 2:29
6. "Theme From "Hotel"" (Johnny Keating, Robert Quine) – 2:36

=== Side 2 ===
1. "For Once in My Life" (Ron Miller, Orlando Murden) – 3:05
2. "You Don't Know Me" (Eddy Arnold, Cindy Walker) – 2:27
3. "Why Try to Change Me Now?" (Cy Coleman, Joseph McCarthy) – 3:14
4. "Welcome to My Love" (Sammy Cahn, Bill Schluger) – 2:35
5. "Ode to Billie Joe" (Bobbie Gentry) – 5:18

=== 1994 CD bonus track ===
1. "Let's Make the Most of a Beautiful Thing" – (Mike Corda, Jacques Wilson) – 2:38

== Personnel ==
- Nancy Wilson – vocals
- Oliver Nelson – arranger, conductor
- Eddie "Lockjaw" Davis – tenor saxophone
- Buster Williams – bass
- Shelly Manne – drums
- Larry Bunker – percussion
- David Cavanaugh – producer

== Charts ==
Chart peaks for Welcome to My Love
Chart (1968)	Peak position
US Billboard Top LPs	115
US Billboard Hot R&B LPs	26
US Cashbox Top 100 Albums	73
