= R.S.V.P. (Rare Songs, Very Personal) =

Studio album by Nancy Wilson
- Released: August 24, 2004
- Recorded: 2004
- Genre: Vocal jazz
- Label: MCG Jazz

Nancy Wilson chronology
A Nancy Wilson Christmas (2001)	R.S.V.P. (Rare Songs, Very Personal) (2004)	Turned to Blue (2006)

Professional ratings
Review scores
Source	Rating
AllMusic	3.5/5 stars

R.S.V.P. (Rare Songs, Very Personal) is a 2004 album by Nancy Wilson, featuring Wilson in duet with George Shearing, Toots Thielemans, Phil Woods, and Gary Burton. At the 47th Grammy Awards, Wilson won the Grammy Award for Best Jazz Vocal Album, for her performance on this album.

== Track listing ==
1. "An Older Man (Is Like an Elegant Wine)" (Lee Wing) – 4:37
2. "Day In, Day Out" (Rube Bloom, Johnny Mercer) – 3:21
3. "Why Did I Choose You" (Michael Leonard, Hugh Martin) – 5:11
4. "I Wish I'd Met You" (Richard Rodney Bennett, Johnny Mandel, Frank Underwood) – 4:59
5. "I Let a Song Go Out of My Heart" (Duke Ellington, Irving Mills, Henry Nemo) – 3:20
6. "Goodbye" (Gordon Jenkins) – 4:18
7. "How About Me?" (Irving Berlin) – 5:16
8. "Minds of Their Own (Dois Corregos)" (Peter Eldridge, Ivan Lins, Caetano Veloso) – 4:13
9. "Little Green Apples" (Bobby Russell) – 4:39
10. "You'll See" (Carroll Coates) – 5:08
11. "That's All" (Alan Brandt, Bob Haymes) – 3:32
12. "Blame It on My Youth" (Edward Heyman, Oscar Levant) – 4:31

== Charts ==
Chart (2004)	Peak position
US Jazz Albums (Billboard)	19
US Traditional Jazz Albums (Billboard)	7

== Personnel ==
=== Performance ===
- Nancy Wilson – vocals
- Arranged by Darmon Meader (track: 5), Jay Ashby (tracks: 6, 7, 8, 11), Johnny Pate (track: 1), Llew Matthews (tracks: 3, 9, 10), Dr. John Wilson (track: 2)
- Arranged by [Strings] – Jay Ashby (tracks: 3)
- Alto Saxophone – Andres Boiarsky (tracks: 2, 5), Andy Snitzer (tracks: 2 5), Mike Tomaro (tracks: 2, 5)
- Backing Vocals – Jay Ashby (tracks: 4), Kim Nazarian (tracks: 4)
- Baritone Saxophone – Jim Germann (tracks: 2, 5)
- Bass – Dwayne Dolphin (tracks: 1, 3, 4, 6 to 11), Rufus Reid (tracks: 2, 5)
- Bass Clarinet – Jim Germann (tracks: 2, 5), Mike Tomaro (tracks: 7)
- Cello – David Premo (tracks: 3)
- Clarinet – Andy Snitzer (tracks: 2, 5, 7), Mike Tomaro (tracks: 2, 5)
- Drums – Jamey Haddad (tracks: 1, 3, 4, 6 to 11), Lewis Nash (tracks: 2, 5)
- Flute – Andres Boiarsky (tracks: 2, 5), Eric DeFade (tracks: 2, 5), Mike Tomaro (tracks: 7)
- Guitar – Marty Ashby (tracks: 2, 5, 8)
- Keyboards – Ivan Lins (tracks: 8), Jay Ashby (tracks: 6)
- Percussion – Jay Ashby (tracks: 6)
- Piano – Llew Matthews (tracks: 1 to 4, 6 to 11)
- Tenor Saxophone – Andy Snitzer (tracks: 2, 5), Eric DeFade (tracks: 2, 5)
- Trombone – Gary Piecka (tracks: 2, 5), Jay Ashby (tracks: 2, 5), Mike Davis* (tracks: 2, 5)
- Trombone [Bass] – Max Seigel (tracks: 2, 5)
- Trumpet – Dennis Reynolds (tracks: 2, 5), Jim Hynes* (tracks: 2, 5), Steve Hawk (tracks: 2, 5)
- Viola – Tatjana Mead Chamis (tracks: 3)
- Violin – Andrés Cárdenes (tracks: 3)
