= Can't Take My Eyes Off You (album) =

1970 album by Nancy Wilson

Studio album by Nancy Wilson
- Released: March 1970
- Recorded: 1970
- Venue: Los Angeles
- Genre: Vocal jazz
- Length: 30:00
- Label: Capitol
- Producer: David Cavanaugh

Nancy Wilson chronology
Hurt So Bad (1969)	Can't Take My Eyes Off You (1970)	Now I'm a Woman (1970)

Professional ratings
Review scores
Source	Rating
Allmusic	3/5 stars
The Virgin Encyclopedia of Jazz	4/5 stars

Can't Take My Eyes Off You is a studio album by Nancy Wilson, released on Capitol Records in 1970. It was produced by David Cavanaugh, with arrangements and conducting by Phil Wright and Jimmy Jones.

In a positive review, Record World called it "another bright and warm outing for the multi-talented Miss Wilson. This is a composer's album with songs by Bacharach and David, Leonard Cohen, Leiber and Stoller, and Jimmy Webb."

The album also contains an early Bacharach song written with Bob Hilliard, "Waitin' For Charlie To Come Home," as well as songs made famous by Dusty Springfield and Blood, Sweat & Tears. The song "Can't Take My Eyes Off You" had been included on Wilson's previous album, Hurt So Bad (1969), but it proved so successful on radio that Capitol made it the title track of her new album.

Can't Take My Eyes Off You entered the Billboard 200 on March 28, 1970, peaking at No. 155 and remaining on the chart for six weeks. It fared better on Billboard's Hot R&B LPs, reaching No. 38.

In 2013, SoulMusic Records released a digitally remastered version of the album, paired with Now I'm a Woman, another Wilson album from 1970. The compact disc contains three bonus tracks.

== Track listing ==
=== Side 1 ===
1. "Waitin' For Charlie To Come Home" (Burt Bacharach, Bob Hilliard) – 2:33
2. "A Brand New Me" (Jerry Butler, Kenneth Gamble, Theresa Bell) – 3:00
3. "Mixed Up Girl" (Jimmy Webb) – 2:30
4. "Raindrops Keep Falling On My Head" (Bacharach, Hal David) – 2:54
5. "This Girl Is a Woman Now" (Alan Bernstein, Victor Millrose) – 3:05

=== Side 2 ===
1. "Can't Take My Eyes Off You" (Bob Crewe, Bob Gaudio) – 3:21
2. "Words And Music" (Jack Segal, Marvin Fisher) – 2:02
3. "Suzanne" (Leonard Cohen) – 4:34
4. "You Made Me So Very Happy" (Berry Gordy, Brenda Holloway, Frank Wilson, Patrice Holloway) – 3:14
5. "Trip With Me" (Jerry Leiber, Mike Stoller) – 2:21

== Personnel ==
- Nancy Wilson – vocals
- Jimmy Jones – arranger, conductor
- Phil Wright – arranger, conductor
- David Cavanaugh – producer
