= If I Had My Way (album) =

Studio album by Nancy Wilson
- Released: June 3, 1997
- Recorded: 1996
- Studio: Ben Wright's Studio (North Hollywood); Capitol (Hollywood); East Bay (Tarrytown, New York); Hideaway (Pomona, California); Hollywood (Hollywood); LDS Labs (Hollywood); MoeJo Recording Studios (Baltimore); Record Plant (Hollywood); Secret (Baltimore); Sonic Jungle (Hollywood); Sony Music (Santa Monica, California); Soundtrack (New York City); VanGuard (Oak Park, Michigan); Westlake (Hollywood, California)
- Length: 47:08
- Label: Columbia
- Producer: Kenneth Crouch; Barry Eastmond; Randy Jackson; Robert Jerald; Randy Jackson; Michael J. Powell; Melissa Ritter; Skip Scarborough

Nancy Wilson chronology
Love, Nancy (1994)	If I Had My Way (1997)	A Nancy Wilson Christmas (2001)

Singles from If I Had My Way
- 1. "Hello Like Before" Released: 1997; 2. "If I Had My Way" Released: 1998

Professional ratings
Review scores
Source	Rating
AllMusic	3.5/5 stars
Calgary Herald	2/4 stars
Detroit Free Press	4/4 stars
The News & Observer	1.5/4 stars
The Record	3.5/4 stars
The Springfield News-Leader	3/4 stars

If I Had My Way is a studio album by American singer Nancy Wilson, released on June 3, 1997, by Columbia Records.

== Track listing ==
No.	Title	Writer(s)	Producer(s)	Length
1.	"Hello Like Before"	Bill Withers; John Collins	Michael J. Powell	4:59
2.	"Sweet Love"	Robert Jerald; Ricky Jones; Melissa Ritter	Jerald; Randy Jackson	4:30
3.	"If I Had My Way"	Jerald; Sherree Ford-Payne	Jackson; Jerald	4:55
4.	"Wish You Were Here" (featuring James Ingram)	Barry J. Eastmond; Jolyon Skinner	Eastmond	4:16
5.	"One More Try"	Eastmond; Gordon Chambers	Jackson	4:38
6.	"Not a Day in Your Life"	Ford-Payne; Damon Thomas	Jackson; Kenneth Crouch	4:46
7.	"Anything for Your Love"	Skip Scarborough; Irmgard Klarmann; Felix Weber	Scarborough	4:42
8.	"Where Do I Go from You"	Diane Warren	Jackson	4:15
9.	"A Fool in Love"	Larry Loftin; Codee	Powell	4:57
10.	"Loving You, Loving Me"	Scarborough	Scarborough	5:09
Total length:				47:08

== Charts ==
Chart (1997)	Peak position
US Contemporary Jazz Albums (Billboard)	5
US Jazz Albums (Billboard)	6
