= Hurt So Bad (album) =

Studio album by Nancy Wilson
- Released: September 1969
- Recorded: 1969
- Genre: Vocal jazz, soul
- Length: 26:59
- Label: Capitol
- Producer: David Cavanaugh

Nancy Wilson chronology
Son of a Preacher Man (1969)	Hurt So Bad (1969)	Can't Take My Eyes Off You (1970)

Professional ratings
Review scores
Source	Rating
Allmusic	2.5/5 stars
The Virgin Encyclopedia of Jazz	3/5 stars

Hurt So Bad is a 1969 studio album by Nancy Wilson, featuring arrangements by Jimmy Jones, Billy May, Oliver Nelson, and others. The album entered the Billboard Top 200 Chart on November 8, 1969, and remained for 18 weeks, peaking at #92 in January 1970.

Jason Ankeny at AllMusic says Hurt So Bad has "a soulful, vibrant sound inspired by mainstream pop and R&B," and that the material ranges from "a subtly funky rendition of 'Willie and Laura Mae Jones' to a poignant 'You're All I Need to Get By' to a dynamic 'Spinning Wheel.'" He notes the "hodgepodge of arrangers" but says the album "is a surprisingly cohesive listen."

== Track listing ==
=== Side 1 ===
1. "Willie and Laura Mae Jones" (Tony Joe White) – 2:47
2. "Let's Make the Most of a Beautiful Thing" (Jacques Wilson, Mike Corda) – 2:40
3. "You're All I Need to Get By" (Nickolas Ashford, Valerie Simpson) – 2:20
4. "Can't Take My Eyes Off You" (Bob Crewe, Bob Gaudio) – 3:21
5. "Hurt So Bad" (Teddy Randazzo, Bobby Weinstein, Bobby Hart) – 3:00

=== Side 2 ===
1. "Spinning Wheel" (David Clayton-Thomas) – 2:38
2. "Do You Know Why" (Jimmy Van Heusen, Johnny Burke) – 2:39
3. "Come Back to Me" (Burton Lane, Alan Jay Lerner) – 2:35
4. "Ages Ago" (Paul Francis Webster, Ronnell Bright) – 2:23
5. "One Soft Night" (Anthony Curtis, Lonnie Tolbert) – 2:36

== Personnel ==
- Nancy Wilson – vocals
- Jimmy Jones – piano, arranger ("Can't Take My Eyes Off You," "Spinning Wheel," "Come Back to Me," "One Soft Night")
- Phil Wright – arranger ("Willie and Laura Mae Jones," "You're All I Need to Get By," "Hurt So Bad")
- Oliver Nelson – arranger ("Let's Make the Most of a Beautiful Thing")
- Billy May – arranger ("Do You Know Why")
- Sid Feller – arranger ("Ages Ago")
- David Cavanaugh – producer
