= Nancy (Nancy Wilson album) =

1969 album by Nancy Wilson

Studio album by Nancy Wilson
- Released: January 1969
- Recorded: 1968
- Venue: Los Angeles
- Genre: Vocal jazz
- Length: 31:08
- Label: Capitol
- Producer: David Cavanaugh

Nancy Wilson chronology
The Sound of Nancy Wilson (1968)	Nancy (1969)	Son of a Preacher Man (1969)

Professional ratings
Review scores
Source	Rating
Allmusic	3.5/5 stars
The Virgin Encyclopedia of Jazz	3/5 stars

Nancy is a studio album by Nancy Wilson, released on Capitol Records in January 1969. It was produced by David Cavanaugh, with arrangements and conducting by Jimmy Jones. Musicians on the album include famed jazz saxophonist Benny Carter, who also serves as arranger for one song.

In his AllMusic review, Andy Kellman calls Nancy "a more stylistically varied album [that] boasts the number 44 R&B single 'You'd Better Go' and the brisk pop of 'In a Long White Room.'"

The album entered the Billboard 200 on February 8, 1969, and remained on the chart for 14 weeks, peaking at No. 117. It did better on the Hot R&B LPs chart, reaching No. 38.

In 2013, Nancy was re-issued on compact disc with her 1968 album The Sound of Nancy Wilson, which was recorded around the same time and also features Benny Carter on alto saxophone and Jimmy Jones as arranger and conductor.

== Track listing ==
=== Side 1 ===
1. "I'm Your Special Fool" (Jimmy Radcliffe, Buddy Scott) – 2:20
2. "Prisoner Of My Eyes (I Can Never Let You Go)" (Lee Pockriss, Hal Hackady) – 3:34
3. "Player Play On" (Anthony Curtis) – 2:20
4. "Only Love " (John Kander, Fred Ebb) – 2:40
5. "Looking Back" (Brook Benton, Belford Hendricks, Clyde Otis) – 3:31
6. "If We Only Have Love" (Jacques Brel, Mort Shuman, Eric Blau) – 3:31

=== Side 2 ===
1. "In A Long White Room" (Martin Charnin, Clint Ballard Jr.) – 2:32
2. "You'd Better Go" (Teddy Randazzo, Bobby Weinstein, Lou Stallman) – 2:40
3. "Quiet Soul" (Gayle Caldwell) – 3:05
4. "What Do You See In Her?" (Frank Weldon, Hal David) – 2:55
5. "We Could Learn Together" (Jimmy Williams, Otis) – 2:30

== Personnel ==
- Nancy Wilson – vocals
- Benny Carter – alto saxophone, arranger ("Prisoner Of My Eyes")
- Jimmy Jones – arranger, conductor
- David Cavanaugh – producer
