= Something Wonderful (Nancy Wilson album) =

Studio album by Nancy Wilson
- Released: October 1960
- Recorded: May 1960
- Studio: Capitol (Hollywood)
- Genre: Vocal jazz
- Length: 29:57
- Label: Capitol
- Producer: Dave Cavanaugh, Tom “Tippy” Morgan

Nancy Wilson chronology
Like in Love (1959)	Something Wonderful (1960)	The Swingin's Mutual! (1961)

Professional ratings
Review scores
Source	Rating
Allmusic	4/5 stars
The Virgin Encyclopedia of Jazz	4/5 stars

Something Wonderful was the second album by the American vocalist Nancy Wilson, it was released in October 1960 by Capitol Records, and arranged by Billy May.

As with her debut album on the label, Like in Love, she was teamed up with Billy May, one of its star arrangers, who had come to prominence through his outstanding work with such singers as Nat King Cole, Dean Martin and Frank Sinatra.

The album spawned one of Wilson's all-time signature songs, "Guess Who I Saw Today". Another highlight was "What a Little Moonlight Can Do", which was, as critic Pete Welding wrote in his liner notes to the 1996 three-CD set Ballads, Blues & Big Bands: The Best of Nancy Wilson, "a song so closely associated with the sublime Billie Holiday (that) few would even have attempted it, let alone brought it off so well, with just the right blend of lightheartedness and sincerity."

In 2003, the UK label EMI Gold re-issued Something Wonderful on a 2-for-1 CD, coupled with its natural companion, Like in Love.

== Track listing ==
1. "Teach Me Tonight" (Gene de Paul, Sammy Cahn) – 2:51
2. "This Time the Dream's on Me" (Johnny Mercer, Harold Arlen) – 2:19
3. "I'm Gonna Laugh You Out of My Life" (Cy Coleman, Joseph Allen McCarthy) – 2:40
4. "I Wish You Love" (Léo Chauliac, Charles Trenet) – 2:00
5. "Guess Who I Saw Today" (Murray Grand, Elisse Boyd) – 3:27
6. "If Dreams Come True" (Edgar Sampson, Benny Goodman) – 1:49
7. "What a Little Moonlight Can Do" (Harry M. Woods) – 2:27
8. "The Great City" (Curtis Lewis) – 2:43
9. "He's My Guy" (Gene de Paul, Don Raye) – 2:28
10. "Something Happens to Me" (Marvin Fisher, Jack Segal) – 1:58
11. "Call It Stormy Monday (But Tuesday Is Just as Bad)" (T-Bone Walker) – 2:28
12. "Something Wonderful Happens" (Del Guerico, Gamse, Thorn) – 2:47

== Personnel ==
=== Performance ===
- Nancy Wilson – vocals
- Billy May – arranger, conductor
- Pete Candoli – trumpet
- Frank Beach – trumpet
- Conrad Gozzo – trumpet
- Mannie Klein – trumpet
- George Roberts – trombone
- Si Zentner – trombone
- Murray McEachern – trombone
- Lloyd Ulyate – trombone
- Ben Webster – tenor saxophone
- Justin Gordon – flute
- Emil Richards – vibraphone
- Milt Raskin – piano & celeste
- Jack Marshall – guitar
- Joe Comfort – bass
- Shelly Manne – drums
