= Like in Love =

Studio album by Nancy Wilson
- Released: April 1960
- Recorded: December 5, 7–8, 1959
- Venue: Los Angeles
- Studio: Capitol (Hollywood)
- Genre: Jazz
- Length: 25:53
- Label: Capitol
- Producer: Dave Cavanaugh, Tom "Tippy" Morgan

Nancy Wilson chronology
Like in Love (1960)	Something Wonderful (1960)

Professional ratings
Review scores
Source	Rating
Allmusic	3/5 stars
The Virgin Encyclopedia of Jazz	4/5 stars

Like in Love! is the debut album by the American vocalist Nancy Wilson, it was released in April 1960 by Capitol Records, and arranged by Billy May.

== Track listing ==
1. "On the Street Where You Live" (Alan Jay Lerner, Frederick Loewe) – 1:42
2. "Night Mist" (Ahmad Jamal) – 2:34
3. "You Leave Me Breathless" (Ralph Freed, Frederick Hollander) – 2:27
4. "The More I See You" (Mack Gordon, Harry Warren) – 2:11
5. "I Want to Be Loved" (Johnny Green, Edward Heyman, Billy Rose) – 2:19
6. "Almost Like Being in Love" (Lerner, Loewe) – 1:46
7. "People Will Say We're in Love" (Oscar Hammerstein II, Richard Rodgers) – 1:57
8. "Passion Flower" (Billy Strayhorn) – 2:23
9. "Sometimes I'm Happy" (Irving Caesar, Vincent Youmans) – 1:46
10. "Fly Me to the Moon" (Bart Howard) – 2:52
11. "All of You" (Cole Porter) – 1:49
12. "If It's the Last Thing I Do" (Sammy Cahn, Saul Chaplin) – 2:07

== Personnel ==
=== Performance ===
From The Music of Billy May: A Discography (Greenwood Press, 1998).

- Nancy Wilson – vocals
- Willie Smith –alto saxophone
- Benny Carter – alto saxophone (1–2, 4–6, 8–9, 11–12)
- Jules Jacob – saxophone (3–5, 7, 10–12)
- Charles Gentry – saxophone (3–5, 7, 10–12)
- William Ulyate – saxophone (1–2, 4–6, 8–9, 11–12)
- Jerome Kasper – saxophone (1–2, 6, 8–9)
- Fred Falensby – saxophone (1–2, 6, 8–9)
- Milt Bernhart – trombone (1–2, 4–6, 8–9, 11–12)
- Tommy Pederson – trombone (3, 7, 10)
- Milt Raskin – piano
- Jack Marshall – guitar (1–3, 6–10)
- Bob Gibbons – guitar (4–5, 11–12)
- Myer Rubin – double bass (1–2, 4–6, 8–9, 11–12)
- Joe Mondragon – double bass (3, 7, 10)
- Irving Cottler – drums (1–3, 6–10)
- Stan Levey – drums (4–5, 11–12)
- Emil Richards – drums (3, 7, 10)
- Billy May – arranger, conductor
