= But Beautiful (Nancy Wilson album) =

1971 studio album by Nancy Wilson

Studio album by Nancy Wilson
- Released: 1971
- Recorded: November 1969
- Genre: Vocal jazz
- Length: 39:03
- Label: Capitol
- Producer: Dave Cavanaugh

Nancy Wilson chronology
Now I'm a Woman (1970)	But Beautiful (1971)	Kaleidoscope (1971)

Professional ratings
Review scores
Source	Rating
Allmusic	4/5 stars
The Virgin Encyclopedia of Jazz	3/5 stars

But Beautiful is a 1971 studio album by Nancy Wilson, with musical accompaniment by the Hank Jones Quartet. It entered the Billboard Top 200 chart on July 17, 1971, and remained for five weeks.

== Track listing ==
1. "Prelude to a Kiss" (Duke Ellington, Irving Gordon, Irving Mills) – 2:45
2. "For Heaven's Sake" (Elise Bretton, Sherman Edwards, Donald Meyer) – 2:50
3. "Happiness is a Thing Called Joe" (Harold Arlen, Yip Harburg) – 2:54
4. "I'll Walk Alone" (Sammy Cahn, Jule Styne) – 3:33
5. "Supper Time" (Irving Berlin) – 3:53
6. "But Beautiful" (Johnny Burke, Jimmy Van Heusen) – 4:05
7. "Oh! Look at Me Now" (Joe Bushkin, John DeVries) – 2:22
8. "Glad to Be Unhappy" (Lorenz Hart, Richard Rodgers) – 3:17
9. "In a Sentimental Mood" (Ellington, Manny Kurtz, Mills) – 2:58
10. "I Thought About You" (Johnny Mercer, Van Heusen) – 2:04
11. "Easy Living" (Ralph Rainger, Leo Robin) – 3:07
12. "Do It Again" (Buddy DeSylva, George Gershwin) – 2:47
13. "Darn That Dream" (Eddie DeLange, Van Heusen) – 2:51

== Personnel ==
- Nancy Wilson – vocals
- Hank Jones – piano
- Gene Bertoncini – guitar
- Ron Carter – double bass
- Grady Tate – drums
