= A Touch of Today =

Studio album by Nancy Wilson
- Released: May 1966
- Recorded: 1966
- Genre: Traditional pop, jazz
- Label: Capitol – T-2495
- Producer: Dave Cavanaugh

Nancy Wilson chronology
From Broadway with Love (1966)	A Touch of Today (1966)	Tender Loving Care (1966)

A Touch of Today is a 1966 studio album by singer Nancy Wilson arranged by Sid Feller and Oliver Nelson and produced by Dave Cavanaugh.

== Reception ==
Professional ratings
Review scores
Source	Rating
Allmusic	2.5/5 stars

The initial Billboard review from May 7, 1966 commented that "Miss Wilson's warmth, feeling and musical understanding highlight new dimensions of today's pop hits".

John Bush reviewed the album for Allmusic and wrote that though Wilson's voice was "as strong and pliable as ever...Wilson isn't always right for this material, as her attempt to sound exuberant on Stevie Wonder's "Uptight (Everything's Alright)" displays". Bush praised Wilson's performances on "The Shadow of Your Smile," "Call Me," "And I Love Her", "Yesterday," and "Goin' out of My Head". Bush concluded that A Touch of Today "...is a solid album adrift in a period of lesser efforts by great singers".

== Track listing ==
1. "You've Got Your Troubles" (Roger Cook, Roger Greenaway) – 2:26
2. "And I Love Him" (John Lennon, Paul McCartney) – 2:20
3. "Uptight (Everything's Alright)" (Henry Cosby, Stevie Wonder, Sylvia Moy) – 1:57
4. "Have a Heart" (Gene DiNovi, Johnny Mercer) – 2:27
5. "Before the Rain" (Edward Yellin, Ralph Carmichael, Sue Raney) – 2:12
6. "The Shadow of Your Smile (Love Theme From "The Sandpiper")" (Johnny Mandel, Paul Francis Webster) – 2:00
7. "Call Me" (Tony Hatch) – 2:15
8. "Yesterday" (Lennon, McCartney) – 2:05
9. "Wasn't It Wonderful" (Eddie Pola, George Wyle) – 1:58
10. "You're Gonna Hear From Me" (Andre Previn, Dory Previn) – 2:44
11. "No One Else But You" (Arthur Altman, Dany Delmin, Jimmy Walter) – 2:10
12. "Goin' Out of My Head" (Bobby Weinstein, Teddy Randazzo) – 2:05

== Personnel ==
- Nancy Wilson – vocals
- Sid Feller, Oliver Nelson – arranger
- George Jerman – cover photography
- Janice May – liner notes
- Dave Cavanaugh – producer
