= Nancy – Naturally =

Nancy - Naturally

Studio album by Nancy Wilson
- Released: December 1966
- Recorded: July 13–15, 1966
- Studio: Capitol (Hollywood)
- Genre: Vocal jazz, soul
- Length: 32:03
- Label: Capitol
- Producer: David Cavanaugh

Nancy Wilson chronology
Tender Loving Care (1966)	Nancy - Naturally (1966)	Just for Now (1967)

Professional ratings
Review scores
Source	Rating
AllMusic	3/5 stars
The Virgin Encyclopedia of Jazz	3/5 stars

Nancy – Naturally is a studio album by Nancy Wilson released in 1966. Billy May served as the arranger and conductor, and David Cavanaugh produced the album. It entered the Billboard 200 on January 28, 1967, and remained on the chart for 21 weeks, peaking at No. 35. It reached #4 on the Hot R&B LPs chart. The song "In The Dark" was released as a single, with "Ten Years Of Tears" as the B-side.

Stephen Cook at AllMusic says, "Wilson displays all her talents" on Nancy – Naturally. "On the blues end of things, she turns the lights down low with a smoldering cover of Lil Green's classic 'In the Dark' and swings it hard and brass-heavy on the Joe Williams/Count Basie number 'Alright, Okay, You Win.' And for some of her patented ballad heaven, there are stunners like Michel Legrand's 'Watch What Happens' and Lil Armstrong's forlorn standard 'Just for a Thrill." Cook applauds Billy May's charts, saying the arranger was "adept with all the album's many moods" and concludes by stating that the record "may not be essential Wilson listening, but it still makes for a very enjoyable trip around the turntable."

== Track listing ==
=== Side 1 ===
1. "In The Dark" (Lil Green) – 2:35
2. "Ten Years Of Tears" (Vicki Harrington) – 2:31
3. "Since I Fell for You" (Buddy Johnson) – 3:10
4. "You Ain't Had The Blues" (Ronnell Bright, Rosebud Joiner) – 2:22
5. "Willow Weep For Me" (Ann Ronell) – 3:19
6. "My Babe" (Willie Dixon) – 2:07

=== Side 2 ===
1. "Just For A Thrill" (Don Raye, Lil Armstrong) – 2:32
2. "Alright, Okay, You Win" (Mayme Watts, Sid Wyche) – 2:17
3. "I Wish I Didn't Love You So" (Frank Loesser) – 3:22
4. "Smack Dab In The Middle" (Charles E. Calhoun) – 2:00
5. "Watch What Happens" (Michel Legrand, Norman Gimbel) – 3:00
6. "Ain't That Lovin' You" (Deadric Malone) – 2:38

== Personnel ==
- Nancy Wilson – vocals
- Willie Smith – alto saxophone
- Wilbur Schwartz – saxophone
- Harry Klee – saxophone
- Justin Gordon – saxophone
- Charles Genty – saxophone
- Don Fagerquist – trumpet
- Tony Terran – trumpet
- Ray Triscari – trumpet
- John Audino – trumpet
- John Fowler – trumpet (2, 4, 9, 12)
- Tommy Pederson – trombone
- Lew McCreary – trombone
- Vernon Friley – trombone
- William Schaefer – trombone
- Francis Howard – trombone
- Ronnell Bright – piano
- Mike Melvoin – organ
- John Collins – guitar
- Herb Ellis – guitar (2, 4, 9, 12)
- Howard Roberts – guitar (except for 2, 4, 9, 12)
- Buster Williams – bass
- Charles Berghofer – bass
- Earl Palmer – drums
- Billy May – arranger, conductor
- David Cavanaugh – producer

From The Music of Billy May: A Discography (Greenwood Press, 1998).
