= With My Lover Beside Me =

Studio album by Nancy Wilson
- Released: October 22, 1991
- Studios: Rumbo Recorders, Canoga Park, California
- Genre: Vocal jazz
- Length: 38:43
- Label: Columbia
- Producers: Eddie Arkin; Barry Manilow

Nancy Wilson chronology
A Lady with a Song (1990)	With My Lover Beside Me (1991)	Love, Nancy (1994)

With My Lover Beside Me is a studio album by American jazz singer Nancy Wilson released in October 1991 by Columbia Records. All music was composed by Barry Manilow (who also served as co-producer), while the lyrics were by Johnny Mercer. The album reached No. 4 on the Billboard Top Contemporary Jazz Albums chart.

== Overview ==
With My Lover Beside Me was produced by Eddie Arkin and Barry Manilow. Guest artists such as Harvey Mason and Kirk Whalum also appeared on the album.

== Accolades ==
Wilson earned a Grammy nomination in the category of Best Traditional Pop Vocal Performance for her performance on the album.

== Critical reception ==
Professional ratings
Review scores
Source	Rating
AllMusic	4.5/5 stars

With a 4.5 out of 5 star rating, Ron Wynn of AllMusic stated that With My Love Beside Me is a "superbly arranged, produced, and mastered session from a wonderful vocalist. Wilson's singing, delivery, and tone are enticing and sensual throughout, even when the songs threaten to get overly sentimental or just sappy".

== Track listing ==
Track no.	Title	Songwriter(s)	Length
1	"With My Lover Beside Me"	Barry Manilow, Johnny Mercer	02:28
2	"Look at You/Something Tells Me I'm Falling in Love"	Barry Manilow, Johnny Mercer	04:43
3	"When October Goes"	Barry Manilow, Johnny Mercer	03:57
4	"Love Is Where You Find It/At Last"	Barry Manilow, Johnny Mercer	04:17
5	"When the Meadow Was Bloomin'"	Barry Manilow, Johnny Mercer	03:36
6	"I Can't Teach My Old Heart New Tricks"	Barry Manilow, Johnny Mercer	03:39
7	"Heart of Mine, Cry On"	Barry Manilow, Johnny Mercer	04:11
8	"Just Remember"	Barry Manilow, Johnny Mercer	03:15
9	"The Last Dream Home"	Barry Manilow, Johnny Mercer	03:44
10	"With My Lover Beside Me" (reprise)	Barry Manilow, Johnny Mercer	01:21
11	"Epilogue" featuring Barry Manilow	Barry Manilow, Johnny Mercer	03:35

== Charts ==
Chart (1992)	Peak position
US Top Contemporary Jazz Albums (Billboard)	4
