= The Sound of Nancy Wilson =

1968 jazz/soul album by Nancy Wilson

Studio album by Nancy Wilson
- Released: September 1968
- Recorded: 1968
- Genre: Vocal jazz, soul
- Length: 33:07
- Label: Capitol
- Producer: David Cavanaugh

Nancy Wilson chronology
| The Best of Nancy Wilson (1968) | The Sound of Nancy Wilson (1968) | Nancy (1969) |

Professional ratings
Review scores
| Source | Rating |
|---|---|
| AllMusic | 3.5/5 stars |
| The Virgin Encyclopedia of Jazz | 4/5 stars |

The Sound of Nancy Wilson is a 1968 studio album by Nancy Wilson, originally subtitled "...An Experience in Motion and Emotion." It features a mixture of vocal jazz, soul, and popular music, and several prominent jazz instrumentalists perform on the album, including Benny Carter, Harry "Sweets" Edison, Shelly Manne, and pianist Jimmy Jones, who also serves as arranger and conductor. The song "Peace of Mind" was released as a single in October 1968.

== Track listing ==
=== Side 1 ===
1. "Out of This World" (Harold Arlen, Johnny Mercer) – 2:20
2. "This Bitter Earth" (Clyde Otis) – 2:25
3. "By Myself" (Arthur Schwartz, Howard Dietz) – 2:39
4. "When the Sun Comes Out" (Arlen, Ted Koehler) – 3:47
5. "Alone With My Thoughts Of You" (Ronnell Bright) – 3:54
6. "It Only Takes A Moment" (Jerry Herman) – 3:14

=== Side 2 ===
1. "Peace of Mind" (Delbert Millard, Nick Woods) – 2:39
2. "The Other Side Of The Tracks" (Carolyn Leigh, Cy Coleman) – 2:11
3. "Below, Above" (Gail Fisher, Oliver Nelson) – 3:20
4. "The Rules Of The Road" (Leigh, Coleman) – 2:27
5. "Black Is Beautiful" (Charles Wood, John Cacavas) – 4:11

== Personnel ==
From the liner notes:

- Nancy Wilson – vocals
- Jimmy Jones – piano, arranger, conductor
- Benny Carter – alto saxophone (solo on "When the Sun Comes Out")
- Harry "Sweets" Edison – trumpet
- Pete Candoli – trumpet
- Clyde Reasinger – trumpet
- John Audino – flugelhorn or trumpet
- Bob Bryant – flugelhorn or trumpet
- Dick Nash – trombone
- Tommy Pederson – trombone
- Chuck Cooper – trombone
- Edward Kusby – trombone
- Lew McCreary – trombone
- Kenny Shroyer – trombone
- Plas Johnson – tenor saxophone
- Chuck Gentry – woodwinds
- Bill Green – woodwinds
- Justin Gordon – woodwinds
- Arthur Herbert – woodwinds
- Donn Trenner – piano
- Buster Williams – bass
- Carol Kaye – electric bass
- Mundell Lowe – guitar
- Bob Bain – guitar
- Shelly Manne – drums
- Larry Bunker – percussion
- Victor Feldman – percussion
- Gene Estes – percussion

Technical personnel

- David Cavanaugh – producer
- Hugh Davies – engineer

== Charts ==
The album reached No. 20 on the Billboard Top R&B LPs chart and No. 122 on the Top Pop LPs chart.

The single "Peace of Mind", with "This Bitter Earth" as the B-side, peaked at No. 55 on the Billboard Hot 100 and No. 24 on the Hot Rhythm & Blues Singles chart.
