= Just for Now (album) =

1967 jazz album by Nancy Wilson

Studio album by Nancy Wilson
- Released: May 1967
- Recorded: March 16–17, 1966, and February 18 & 20, 1967
- Genre: Vocal jazz
- Length: 29:43
- Label: Capitol
- Producer: David Cavanaugh

Nancy Wilson chronology
Nancy – Naturally (1967)	Just for Now (1967)	Lush Life (1967)

Professional ratings
Review scores
Source	Rating
Allmusic	2/5 stars
The Virgin Encyclopedia of Jazz	3/5 stars

Just for Now is a 1967 studio album by Nancy Wilson, featuring arrangements by Billy May, Oliver Nelson, and Sid Feller. The album entered the Billboard 200 on June 3, 1967, and remained on the chart for 15 weeks, peaking at No. 40. It reached No. 8 on the Hot R&B LPs chart.

== Track listing ==
=== Side 1 ===
1. "Born Free" (Don Black, John Barry) – 2:04
2. "That's Life" (Dean Kay, Kelly Gordon) – 2:35
3. "What Now, My Love" (Pierre Delanoë, Carl Sigman, Gilbert Bécaud) – 2:25
4. "Rain Sometimes" (Arthur Hamilton) – 2:16
5. "Alfie" (Burt Bacharach, Hal David) – 3:01
6. "Mercy, Mercy, Mercy" (Joe Zawinul, Gail Levy, Vincent Levy) – 3:26

=== Side 2 ===
1. "Winchester Cathedral" (Geoff Stephens) – 2:33
2. "If He Walked Into My Life" (Jerry Herman) – 3:49
3. "Love Can Do Anything" (Gene Di Novi, Mary Ann Maurer) – 2:34
4. "Just for Now" (Dick Winograde) – 2:16
5. "I'll Make A Man Of The Man" (Jimmy Van Heusen, Sammy Cahn) – 2:44

== Personnel ==
- Nancy Wilson – vocals
- Plas Johnson – tenor saxophone
- Pete Candoli – trumpet
- Donn Trenner – piano
- Mike Melvoin – organ
- John Collins – guitar
- Buster Williams – bass
- Earl Palmer – drums, latin percussion, bells
- Billy May – arranger, conductor (A1–3, A5–6, B1–2, B4)
- Oliver Nelson – arranger, conductor (A4, B3)
- Sid Feller – arranger, conductor (B5)
- David Cavanaugh – producer
