= Tender Loving Care (Nancy Wilson album) =

Studio album by Nancy Wilson
- Released: July 1966
- Recorded: January 24–26, 1966
- Venue: Los Angeles
- Studio: Capitol (Hollywood)
- Genre: Vocal jazz
- Label: Capitol
- Producer: David Cavanaugh

Nancy Wilson chronology
A Touch of Today (1967)	Tender Loving Care (1966)	Nancy – Naturally (1968)

Professional ratings
Review scores
Source	Rating
Allmusic	4.5/5 stars

Tender Loving Care is a 1966 album by Nancy Wilson, arranged by Billy May. Jason Ankeny of AllMusic wrote: "Wilson is at her best here, taking full command of the familiar songs and re-animating them with vocals that are bold, sophisticated, and daringly adult."

== Track listing ==
=== Side 1 ===
1. "Don't Go to Strangers" (Arthur Kent, David Mann, Redd Evans) – 2:52
2. "Gee, Baby, Ain't I Good to You" (Don Redman, Andy Razaf) – 2:28
3. "Your Name Is Love" (Gene de Paul, Charles Rinker) – 2:15
4. "Too Late Now" (Burton Lane, Alan Jay Lerner) – 2:58
5. "Like Someone in Love" (Jimmy Van Heusen, Johnny Burke) – 2:21
6. "Tender Loving Care" (Johnny Mercer, Ronnell Bright) – 2:44

=== Side 2 ===
1. "As You Desire Me" (Allie Wrubel)
2. "I Want To Talk About You" (Billy Eckstine)
3. "Love-Wise" (Marvin Fisher, Kenward Elmslie)
4. "Try A Little Tenderness" (Harry M. Woods, Jimmy Campbell, Reg Connelly)
5. "Close Your Eyes" (Bernice Petkere)

== Personnel ==
- Nancy Wilson – vocals
- Ronnell Bright – piano
- John Collins – guitar
- Buster Williams – double bass
- Shelly Manne – drums
- Catherine Gotthoffer – harp (1,4,10–11)
- Verlye Mills – harp (3,6–7,9)
- Uan Rasey – trumpet (2,5,8)
- Al Porcino – trumpet (2,5,8)
- Joseph Graves – trumpet (2,5,8)
- James Salko – trumpet (2,5,8)
- Lew McCreary – trombone (2,5,8)
- Richard Noel – trombone (2,5,8)
- Tommy Pederson – trombone (2,5,8)
- William Schaefer – trombone (2,5,8)
- Vincent DeRosa – French horn (2,5,8)
- Arthur Frantz – French horn (2,5,8)
- Richard Perissi – French horn (2,5,8)
- James Decker – French horn (2,5,8)
- Red Callender – tuba (2,5,8)

From The Music of Billy May: A Discography (Greenwood Press, 1998).
