= Today, Tomorrow, Forever (Nancy Wilson album) =

Studio album by Nancy Wilson
- Released: May 1964
- Recorded: 1964
- Genre: Vocal jazz
- Length: 42:05
- Label: Capitol
- Producer: Dave Cavanaugh

Nancy Wilson chronology
Yesterday's Love Songs/Today's Blues (1964)	Today, Tomorrow, Forever (1964)	How Glad I Am (1964)

Professional ratings
Review scores
Source	Rating
AllMusic	4/5 stars
Record Mirror	5/5 stars

Today, Tomorrow, Forever is a 1964 album by Nancy Wilson.

== Track listing ==
1. "One Note Samba" (Antonio Carlos Jobim, Newton Mendonça, Jon Hendricks) – 2:00
2. "Go Away Little Boy" (Gerry Goffin, Carole King) – 2:51
3. "Unchain My Heart" (Bobby Sharp) – 2:07
4. "I Left My Heart in San Francisco" (George Cory, Douglass Cross) – 2:23
5. "Wives and Lovers" (Burt Bacharach, Hal David) – 2:02
6. "The Good Life" (Sacha Distel, Jack Reardon) – 2:29
7. "What Kind of Fool Am I?" (Leslie Bricusse, Anthony Newley) – 2:11
8. "I Can't Stop Loving You" (Don Gibson) – 2:37
9. "On Broadway" (Barry Mann, Cynthia Weil, Jerry Leiber and Mike Stoller) – 1:49
10. "Our Day Will Come" (Mort Garson, Bob Hilliard) – 2:16
11. "Call Me Irresponsible" (Jimmy Van Heusen, Sammy Cahn) – 2:29
12. "Tonight May Have to Last Me All My Life" (Donald Borzage, Johnny Mercer) – 2:53

== Personnel ==
- Nancy Wilson – vocals
- Lou Blackburn – trombone
- Bill Perkins – tenor saxophone
- John Gray – guitar
- Bill Plummer – double bass
- Lou Levy – piano, celeste
- Jack Wilson – electronic organ, piano
- Milt Holland – percussion, conga
- Kenny Dennis – drums, arranger
