= Now I'm a Woman =

1970 album by Nancy Wilson

Studio album by Nancy Wilson
- Released: July 1970
- Venue: Los Angeles
- Genre: Vocal jazz, soul
- Length: 33:00
- Label: Capitol
- Producer: Staff for Gamble-Huff Productions

Nancy Wilson chronology
Can't Take My Eyes Off You (1970)	Now I'm a Woman (1970)	But Beautiful (1971)

Professional ratings
Review scores
Source	Rating
Allmusic	4/5 stars
The Virgin Encyclopedia of Jazz	3/5 stars

Now I'm a Woman is a studio album by Nancy Wilson, released on Capitol Records in July 1970. It marked a transition in Wilson's career towards R&B-oriented material that she would record over the next decade. The production team of Kenny Gamble and Leon Huff, known for developing Philadelphia soul, wrote songs for Wilson and used their staff of arrangers-conductors, including Bobby Martin and Thom Bell, to create a record with "the Philly sound." David Cavanaugh, who had produced all of Wilson's albums since her 1959 debut, served as executive producer on the project.

Jason Elias of AllMusic calls Now I'm a Woman "an important album in Wilson's oeuvre and the Philly sound." He notes that "Wilson falls right into the production style. The title track is a customary strong outing from Kenny Gamble and Leon Huff." He also highlights "the beautiful" Gamble-Huff song "Joe," noting Bell's production and saying, "Wilson gives an amazing performance and a particularly emotional note that might go through a listener."

Reviewing the album in 1970, Billboard praised Wilson as "a talent of consistent fine quality" and said "in this album she demonstrates her versatility and professionalism." Stereo Review had mixed feelings about the album, saying, "She's as good as ever. That is, if you like last year's hits warmed over." But they also praised several songs on the second side. "Let's Fall in Love All Over Again is a wildly gushy old-fashioned love song, and I'm wild about it. Make It with You is my favorite and for me the flirt song of the year."

Now I'm a Woman was a No. 5 hit on Billboard's Best Selling Soul LPs, and remained on the chart for 23 weeks, while the title track reached No. 41 on Best Selling Soul Singles. The album entered the Billboard 200 on November 28, 1970, eventually peaking at No. 54.

In 2013, SoulMusic Records released a digitally remastered version of the album, paired with Can't Take My Eyes Off You, another Wilson album from 1970. The compact disc contains three bonus tracks.

== Track listing ==
=== Side 1 ===
1. "Now I'm a Woman" (Kenny Gamble, Leon Huff) – 2:50
2. "Joe" (Allan Felder, Kenny Gamble, Norman Harris) – 2:23
3. "(They Long to Be) Close to You" (Burt Bacharach, Hal David) – 3:30
4. "The Long and Winding Road" (John Lennon, Paul McCartney) – 2:28
5. "Bridge over Troubled Water" (Paul Simon) – 5:00

=== Side 2 ===
1. "Let's Fall in Love All Over" (Bobby Martin) – 3:12
2. "Lonely, Lonely" (Gamble, Huff) – 2:58
3. "How Many Broken Wings" (Helen Lewis, Kay Lewis) – 3:13
4. "The Real Me" (Gamble, Huff) – 2:50
5. "Make It with You" (David Gates) – 3:01

== Personnel ==
- Nancy Wilson – vocals
- Bobby Martin – arranger, conductor
- Thom Bell – arranger
- Lenny Pakula – arranger
- David Cavanaugh – executive producer
- Jay Ranellucci – engineer
