= Turned to Blue =

Studio album by Nancy Wilson
- Released: August 22, 2006
- Genre: Jazz
- Length: 52:02
- Label: MCG Jazz
- Producer: Marty Ashby

Nancy Wilson chronology
R.S.V.P. (2004)	Turned to Blue (2006)

Professional ratings
Review scores
Source	Rating
Allmusic	link

Turned to Blue is the fifty-second and final studio album by American jazz singer Nancy Wilson. It was released in 2006 through MCG Jazz. The title track is a poem written by Maya Angelou. The album won Best Jazz Vocal Album at the 49th Annual Grammy Awards, becoming Wilson's third and final Grammy win.

== Track listing ==
Turned to Blue track listing
No.	Title	Writer(s)	Length
1.	"This Is All I Ask"	Gordon Jenkins	5:56
2.	"Take Love Easy"	Duke Ellington; John La Touche	4:30
3.	"Turned to Blue"	Jay Ashby; Maya Angelou	4:02
4.	"Knitting Class"	K. Lawrence Dunham; Bryce Rohde	3:53
5.	"Be My Love"	Nicholas Brodszky; Sammy Cahn	3:55
6.	"Taking a Chance on Love"	Vernon Duke; Ted Fetter; La Touche	3:17
7.	"Just Once"	Barry Mann; Cynthia Weil	4:21
8.	"These Golden Years"	D. Channsin Berry; John Proulx	6:10
9.	"I Don't Remember Ever Growing Up"	Artie Butler	5:17
10.	"Old Folks"	Dedette Lee Hill; Willard Robison	5:24
11.	"I'll Be Seeing You"	Sammy Fain; Irving Kahal	5:17
Total length:			52:02

== Charts ==
Chart (2007)	Peak position
US Jazz Albums (Billboard)	11
US Traditional Jazz Albums (Billboard)	7

== Featured performers ==
Several noted performers were featured on this recording, including (but not limited to):

- Hubert Laws on flute
- Billy Taylor on piano
- Andy Narell on steelpan

=== Reedists ===
Several reedists were featured on this recording, many of which are well-known saxophonists:

- Jimmy Heath
- Bob Mintzer
- Andy Snitzer
- Eric DeFade
- James Moody
- Tom Scott
- Sean Jones on trumpet
