= From Broadway with Love =

Studio album by Nancy Wilson
- Released: January 1966
- Recorded: 1966
- Genre: Traditional pop, jazz
- Label: Capitol – T-2433
- Producer: Dave Cavanaugh

Nancy Wilson chronology
Gentle Is My Love (1965)	From Broadway with Love (1966)	A Touch of Today (1966)

From Broadway with Love is a 1966 studio album by singer Nancy Wilson arranged by Sid Feller and produced by Dave Cavanaugh.

== Reception ==
Professional ratings
Review scores
Source	Rating
Allmusic	4/5 stars
Record Mirror	5/5 stars

The initial Billboard magazine review from January 22, 1966 commented that "this new set has a strong representation of topflight show song material and she sings them with unusual precision".

Jason Ankeny reviewed the album for Allmusic and wrote that the album "...bends the material to the singer's strengths, eschewing show tune dramatics in favor of subtle, atmospheric arrangements...". Ankeny highlighted "He Loves Me" and "Here's That Rainy Day" as "play[ing] perfectly to the singer's remarkable capacity to articulate the exhilaration and heartache of romance".

== Track listing ==
1. "Hey There" (Richard Adler, Jerry Ross) – 2:23
2. "This Dream" (Leslie Bricusse, Anthony Newley) – 2:00
3. "I'll Only Miss Him When I Think of Him" (Sammy Cahn, Jimmy Van Heusen) – 2:46
4. "He Loves Me" (Jerry Bock, Sheldon Harnick) – 2:27
5. "Here's That Rainy Day" (Van Heusen) – 2:28
6. "I Had a Ball" (Jack Lawrence, Stan Freeman) – 2:02
7. "Hello, Dolly!" (Jerry Herman) – 2:24
8. "Makin' Whoopee" (Walter Donaldson, Gus Kahn) – 2:20
9. "Somewhere" (Leonard Bernstein, Stephen Sondheim) – 2:26
10. "I've Got Your Number" (Cy Coleman, Carolyn Leigh) – 2:17
11. "Young and Foolish" (Albert Hague) – 2:50
12. "You'd Better Love Me" (Timothy Gray, Hugh Martin) – 2:14

== Personnel ==
- Nancy Wilson – vocals
- Sid Feller – arranger, conductor
- Dave Cavanaugh – producer
