= Son of a Preacher Man (Nancy Wilson album) =

1969 album by Nancy Wilson

Studio album by Nancy Wilson
- Released: June 1969
- Venue: Los Angeles
- Genre: Vocal jazz
- Length: 33:06
- Label: Capitol
- Producer: David Cavanaugh

Nancy Wilson chronology
Nancy (1969)	Son of a Preacher Man (1969)	Hurt So Bad (1969)

Professional ratings
Review scores
Source	Rating
Allmusic	3.5/5 stars
The Virgin Encyclopedia of Jazz	3/5 stars

Son of a Preacher Man is a studio album by Nancy Wilson, released on Capitol Records in June 1969. It was produced by David Cavanaugh, with arrangements and conducting by Jimmy Jones, Phil Wright, and Joe Parnello. Like other Wilson albums from the same time period, it features a combination of vocal jazz, soul, blues, and popular music, but it also contains songs by country artists Hank Cochran, Roger Miller, and Bobby Russell.

AllMusic calls Son of a Preacher Man a "soulful, sexy collection," with "percolating grooves [that] capture the singer at her hippest." Reviewer Jason Ankeny highlights "Almost Persuaded" and "By the Time I Get to Phoenix," saying the songs "boast an earthy appeal that contrasts sharply with Wilson's signature sophistication, pushing the singer in unexpected but fascinating directions." High Fidelity News hails the "selection of killer blues and soul tracks," including the title song, "delivered with such panache that you wonder why this ever went out of print."

The album entered the Billboard 200 on July 5, 1969, peaking at No. 122. It achieved more success on Billboard's Hot R&B LPs, reaching No. 20 and staying on the chart for 23 weeks.

In 2013, SoulMusic Records released a digitally remastered version of the album, paired with Hurt So Bad, another Wilson record from the same time period.

== Track listing ==
=== Side 1 ===
1. "Son Of A Preacher Man" (John Hurley, Ronnie Wilkins) – 2:53
2. "By The Time I Get To Phoenix" (Jimmy Webb) – 3:43
3. "Mr. Walker, It's All Over" (Gene Crysler) – 3:15
4. "I Made You This Way" (Bobby Russell) – 4:38
5. "Almost Persuaded" (Billy Sherrill, Glenn Sutton) – 2:47

=== Side 2 ===
1. "Got It Together" (Charles W. Rainey) – 3:09
2. "Make The World Go Away" (Hank Cochran) – 2:38
3. "Husbands And Wives" (Roger Miller) – 3:10
4. "Little Green Apples"(Russell) – 4:30
5. "Trouble In Mind" (Richard M. Jones) – 2:24

== Personnel ==
- Nancy Wilson – vocals
- Jimmy Jones – arranger, conductor
- Phil Wright – arranger, conductor
- Joe Parnello – arranger, conductor
- David Cavanaugh – producer
- Roger Prigent – cover photo
