= John Levy (musician) =

American jazz bassist and manager (1912–2012)

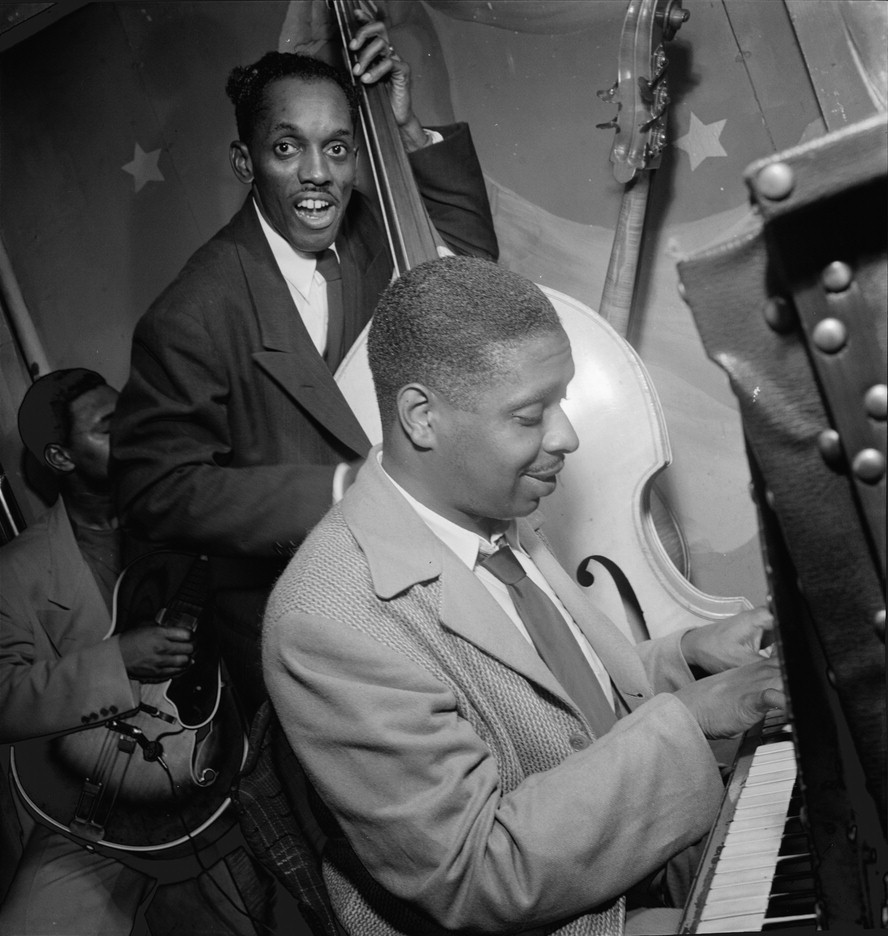
- Jimmy Jones and John Levy, 1947. Photography by William P. Gottlieb.

Background information
- Born: April 11, 1912; New Orleans, Louisiana
- Died: January 20, 2012 (aged 99) Altadena, California
- Instrument: bass

John Levy (April 11, 1912 – January 20, 2012) was an American jazz double-bassist and businessman.

== Life ==
Levy was born in New Orleans, Louisiana. In 1944, he left his family home in Chicago, Illinois, and moved to New York City where he played bass for such jazz musicians as Ben Webster, Erroll Garner, Milt Jackson, and Billie Holiday. In 1949, he became the bassist in the original George Shearing Quintet, where he also acted as Shearing's road manager. In 1951, Levy opened John Levy Enterprises, Inc., becoming the first African-American personal manager in the pop or jazz music field. By the 1960s, Levy's client roster included Shearing, Nancy Wilson, Joe Williams, Cannonball Adderley, Ramsey Lewis, Billy Taylor, and Nikki Price, as well as Shirley Horn and Soul singer Jimmie Raye.

In 1997, Levy was inducted into the International Jazz Hall of Fame, and in 2006 he was named a Jazz Master by the National Endowment for the Arts.

He died on January 20, 2012, aged 99, in Altadena, California.
