= A Nancy Wilson Christmas =

Studio album by Nancy Wilson
- Released: September 25, 2001
- Recorded: 2001
- Genre: Christmas, traditional pop
- Length: 57:19
- Label: MCG Jazz
- Producer: Jay Ashby

Nancy Wilson chronology
If I Had My Way (1997)	A Nancy Wilson Christmas (2001)	Meant to Be (2002)

A Nancy Wilson Christmas is a 2001 studio album of Christmas music by the American singer Nancy Wilson. As well as being Wilson's first album of Christmas music, it was the first album that Wilson recorded for the Manchester Craftsmen's Guild record label, MCG Jazz.

== Reception ==
Professional ratings
Review scores
Source	Rating
Allmusic	4/5 stars

Rick Anderson on Allmusic.com gave the album four stars out of five. Anderson expressed surprise that this was Wilson's first Christmas album and described it as "sweet-spirited and gently eclectic as you'd expect...Wilson manages to keep things both interesting and fun. The fact that her voice remains as powerful and nuanced as ever doesn't hurt, either." The album was also positively reviewed in Billboard by Melinda Newman who commented that "The party to attend this year is at Wilson's house...just a collection of traditional tunes delivered with beautiful understatement by Wilson..."

== Track listing ==
1. "Let It Snow! Let It Snow! Let It Snow!" (Sammy Cahn, Jule Styne) - 3:54
2. "Sweet Little Jesus Boy" (Robert MacGimsey) - 4:08
3. "White Christmas" (Irving Berlin) - 3:47
4. "Silver Bells" (Ray Evans, Jay Livingston) - 4:04
5. "What Are You Doing New Year's Eve?" (Frank Loesser) - 4:48
6. "All Through the Night" (Traditional) - 3:56
7. "O Christmas Tree" (Traditional) - 4:39
8. "O Holy Night" (Adolphe Adam, John Sullivan Dwight) - 5:02
9. "Carol of the Bells" (Traditional) - 6:28
10. "God Rest Ye Merry Gentlemen" (Traditional) - 3:29
11. "Christmas Time Is Here" (Vince Guaraldi, Lee Mendelson) - 3:29
12. "Angels We Have Heard on High" (Traditional) - 3:49
13. "The Christmas Song" (Mel Tormé, Robert Wells) - 5:31

== Charts ==
Chart (2001–2002)	Peak position
US Independent Albums (Billboard)	13
US Jazz Albums (Billboard)	7
US Traditional Jazz Albums (Billboard)	5
