= Lush Life (Nancy Wilson album) =

Studio album by Nancy Wilson
- Released: August 1967
- Recorded: May 13–16, 1967
- Studio: Capitol (Hollywood)
- Genre: Vocal jazz
- Label: Capitol
- Producer: Dave Cavanaugh

Nancy Wilson chronology
Just for Now (1967)	Lush Life (1967)	Easy (1968)

Professional ratings
Review scores
Source	Rating
Allmusic	3/5 stars
The Virgin Encyclopedia of Jazz	4/5 stars

Lush Life is a 1967 album by Nancy Wilson, arranged by Billy May, Sid Feller, and Oliver Nelson.

In his AllMusic review, Nick Dedina says the album continues "Wilson's winning formula of combining jazz and adult pop." He also praises Billy May's arrangement of the title track "as a means to tip his hat to Billy Strayhorn, the song's composer, with a smart mix of big band swagger, intimate small-group jazz, and moody orchestral flourishes straight out of an old film noir."

Author and music critic Will Friedwald also recommends the title song, hailing it as one of the "good orchestral versions" of the famous jazz standard and commending Wilson for how she "slyly uses 'A-Train' as a countermelody."

A 1970 LP reissue was entitled The Right To Love. In 1995, Capitol released the album on compact disc under its original title, with one additional track ("Do You Know Why") and a different song order.

== Track listing ==
=== 1967 Original LP ===
Side 1
No.	Title	Writer(s)	Length
1.	"Free Again"	Joss Baselli, Armand Canfora, Robert Colby	3:45
2.	"Midnight Sun"	Sonny Burke, Lionel Hampton, Johnny Mercer	3:48
3.	"Only the Young"	Richard Ahlert, Marvin Fisher	2:23
4.	"(Ah, the Apple Trees) When the World Was Young"	Mercer, Michel Philippe-Gérard, Angèle Vannier	3:15
5.	"The Right to Love (Reflections)"	Gene Lees, Lalo Schifrin	3:24
6.	"Lush Life"	Billy Strayhorn	3:27
Total length:			20:02

Side 2
No.	Title	Writer(s)	Length
1.	"Over the Weekend"	John Benson Brooks, Joseph McCarthy	3:02
2.	"You've Changed"	Bill Carey, Carl T. Fischer	2:48
3.	"River Shallow"	André Previn, Dory Previn	3:28
4.	"Sunny"	Bobby Hebb	3:58
5.	"(I Stayed) Too Long at the Fair"	Billy Barnes	3:22
Total length:			16:38

=== 1995 CD reissue ===
No.	Title	Writer(s)	Length
1.	"Free Again"	Joss Baselli, Armand Canfora, Robert Colby	3:47
2.	"You've Changed"	Bill Carey, Carl T. Fischer	2:49
3.	"Only the Young"	Richard Ahlert, Marvin Fisher	2:24
4.	"Lush Life"	Billy Strayhorn	3:27
5.	"Do You Know Why?" (Bonus track not on original LP)	Johnny Burke, Jimmy Van Heusen	2:41
6.	"Midnight Sun"	Sonny Burke, Lionel Hampton, Johnny Mercer	3:51
7.	"When the World Was Young (Ah, the Apple Trees)"	Mercer, Michel Philippe-Gérard, Angèle Vannier	3:15
8.	"River Shallow"	André Previn, Dory Previn	3:28
9.	"(I Stayed) Too Long at the Fair"	Billy Barnes	3:26
10.	"Sunny"	Bobby Hebb	3:59
11.	"The Right to Love (Reflections)"	Gene Lees, Lalo Schifrin	3:26
12.	"Over the Weekend"	John Benson Brooks, Joseph McCarthy	3:02
Total length:			39:35

== Personnel ==
=== Performance ===
From The Music of Billy May: A Discography (Greenwood Press, 1998).

- Nancy Wilson – vocals
- Ted Nash –clarinet, flute
- Abe Most – clarinet, flute
- Justin Gordon – bassoon, clarinet, flute
- Harry Klee – bass flute, clarinet, flute
- Robert Hardaway – English horn, bassoon, clarinet, flute
- Phillip Teele – trombone
- Vincent DeRosa – French horn
- Henry Sigismonti – French horn
- Richard Mackey – French horn
- William Hinshaw – French horn
- Donn Trenner – piano
- John Collins – guitar
- Buster Williams – double bass
- Shelly Manne – drums
- Larry Bunker – percussion
- Victor Feldman – percussion
- Ann Stockton – harp
- Catherine Gotthoffer – harp
