= A Lady with a Song =

Studio album by Nancy Wilson
- Released: February 1990
- Studio: various
- Genre: Vocal jazz
- Length: 46:21
- Label: Columbia
- Producer: Gene McDaniels, K.C. Porter, Ken Hirsch, Kiyoshi Itoh, Larry Ball, Lorrin Bates, Michael O'Hara, Sami McKinney, Skip Scarborough

Nancy Wilson chronology
Nancy Now! (1988)	A Lady with a Song (1990)	With My Lover Beside Me (1991)

Professional ratings
Review scores
Source	Rating
AllMusic	3/5 stars

A Lady with a Song is a studio album by American jazz singer Nancy Wilson released by Columbia Records in 1990. The album reached No. 8 on the Billboard Contemporary Jazz Albums chart.

== Overview ==
Philip Bailey along with Wanda Vaughn and Jeanette Hawes of the Emotions appear on the album.

== Critical reception ==
Carl Allen of the Buffalo News with praise wrote, "A Lady With a Song (Columbia 45378), her 52nd album, reaffirms Wilson as a precious artistic commodity in an era when many performers slide by with a catchy beat, screaming their lyrics in a flawed effort to utter them with emotion."

William Ruhlmann of AllMusic also remarked "The arrangements are full of electronic keyboard washes, popping basslines, and soulful female backup vocals with the occasional piercing saxophone part, all in support of (and at times overwhelming) Wilson's smoky alto vocals... But the quality of the songwriting lets Wilson down, and, anyway, the approach is not natural to her. She is jazzier and classier than this kind of thing, and while she made a valiant attempt to meet the R&B charts more than halfway, she is not heard at her best here".

== Track listing ==
No.	Title	Writer(s)	Length
1.	"Do You Still Dream About Me"	Sami McKinney, Tsushi Takayanagi	4:50
2.	"Now I Know"	Mary Unobsky, Michael O'Hara, Sami McKinney	3:59
3.	"Time out for Love"	Lou Pardini, Sami McKinney	4:08
4.	"Don't Ask My Neighbours"	Skip Scarborough	4:42
5.	"A Lady with a Song"	Ken Hirsch, Lorrin Bates	4:24
6.	"That's What I Remember"	K.C. Porter, Karin Rybar, Sami McKinney	3:58
7.	"This Love Is What I Need"	Carrie Thompson, John Goforth, Ted Brancato	4:41
8.	"Other Side of the Storm"	Larry Ball, Lorrin Bates	4:13
9.	"Melody Is You"	Gene McDaniels, Mike Nelvoin	5:58
10.	"Heaven's Hands"	John West, Lorrin Bates	5:24
Total length:			46:21

== Charts ==
Chart (1990)	Peak position
US Top Contemporary Jazz Albums (Billboard)	8
US Top R&B/Hip-Hop Albums (Billboard)	68
