= Echoes of an Era 2: The Concert =

1982 album by various artists

Live album by Lenny White et al.
- Released: 1982
- Recorded: April 7, 1982
- Venue: Reseda, Los Angeles, California
- Studio: Reseda Country Club
- Genre: Jazz, Vocal jazz
- Length: 53:03
- Label: Elektra/Musician
- Producer: Lenny White and Jeffrey Weber

Lenny White et al. chronology
Echoes of an Era (1982)	Echoes of an Era 2: The Concert (1982)

Professional ratings
Review scores
Source	Rating
The Rolling Stone Jazz Record Guide	4/5 stars

Echoes of an Era 2: The Concert is a live album by Joe Henderson, Chick Corea, Stanley Clarke, Lenny White, and vocalist Nancy Wilson, released in 1982 on Elektra/Musician. It was a follow-up to the studio recording Echoes of an Era that had been released earlier in the year and featured Chaka Khan on vocals, supported by the same instrumentalists, along with Freddie Hubbard.

According to Monika Herzig's book, Experiencing Chick Corea: A Listener's Companion, Khan's "management did not open up her schedule to join the group for a series of tour opportunities," so the musicians invited Nancy Wilson to serve as vocalist for a series of concerts. In the liner notes for Echoes of an Era 2, White says he first met Wilson in 1972 on a tour with Freddie Hubbard and "learned of her musical abilities then." For the concerts, which were done without rehearsal, White says, "We took her out of her usual context here and made her the fifth instrument in this 'quintet.'" Similar to the studio release, the concert includes a mixture of jazz standards from the Great American Songbook, work by Thelonious Monk, and an original composition by Chick Corea.

The album reached No. 29 on the Billboard Jazz Lps chart.

Echoes of an Era 1 & 2 are two of four albums by Henderson, Hubbard, Corea, Clarke and White – a group dubbed the "Griffith Park band" in White's liner notes. At the request of Elektra president Bruce Lundvall, they also recorded two instrumental albums during the same time period: The Griffith Park Collection and The Griffith Park Collection 2: In Concert. White called Echoes of an Era 2: The Concert the "third part of the series."

== Track listing ==
=== Side 1 ===
1. "I Want to Be Happy" (Vincent Youmans, Irving Caesar) – 3:24
2. "I Get a Kick Out of You" (Cole Porter) – 7:33
3. "'Round Midnight" (Thelonious Monk) – 7:40
4. "Rhythm-a-Ning" (Monk) – 8:12

=== Side 2 ===
1. "500 Miles High" (Chick Corea) – 11:57
2. "But Not for Me" (George Gershwin, Ira Gershwin) – 3:23
3. "My One and Only Love" (Guy Wood, Robert Mellin) – 7:15
4. "Them There Eyes" (Maceo Pinkard, Doris Tauber, William Tracey) – 3:39

== Personnel ==
=== Performance ===
- Nancy Wilson – vocals (except for "Rhythm-a-Ning" and 500 Miles High")
- Joe Henderson – tenor saxophone
- Chick Corea – piano
- Stanley Clarke – acoustic bass
- Lenny White – drums

=== Production ===
- Lenny White – producer
- Jeffrey Weber – producer
- John Smith – executive producer
- Rik Pekkonen – recording engineer
- John Searle – sound engineer
- Recorded live to two tracks on April 7, 1982 at the Country Club, Reseda, CA.
