= Nancy Wilson/Cannonball Adderley =

1962 album by Nancy Wilson and Cannonball Adderley

Studio album by Nancy Wilson, Cannonball Adderley
- Released: February 1962
- Recorded: June 27 & 29, and August 23–24, 1961
- Genre: Jazz
- Length: 41:34
- Label: Capitol
- Producer: Tom “Tippy” Morgan, Andy Wiswell

Nancy Wilson chronology
The Swingin's Mutual! (1960)	Nancy Wilson/Cannonball Adderley (1962)	Hello Young Lovers (1962)

Cannonball Adderley chronology
Plus (1961)	Nancy Wilson/Cannonball Adderley (1962)	The Cannonball Adderley Sextet in New York (1962)

Nancy Wilson/Cannonball Adderley is a studio album by Nancy Wilson and Cannonball Adderley issued in February 1962 by Capitol Records. The album rose to No. 30 on the Billboard Top LPs chart.

== Overview ==
Wilson considered her vocals on the album "as a sort of easy-going third horn" (Wilson quoted in the liner notes). All tracks were recorded in New York City, those with Wilson on June 27 and 29, 1961, and the instrumental tracks on August 23 and 24, 1961.

== Reception ==
Professional ratings
Review scores
Source	Rating
AllMusic	4.5/5 stars
The Penguin Guide to Jazz	3/4 stars
The Rolling Stone Jazz Record Guide	2/5 stars
The Virgin Encyclopedia of Jazz	4/5 stars

The Penguin Guide to Jazz states: "The odd session out is the date with Nancy Wilson for Capitol, primarily designed as a showcase for the young singer but with five band-only tracks as well. Wilson had a self-conscious phrasing and melodramatic lighting-up of key lines – but there is a version of 'A Sleeping Bee' here which is one of the most charming of all her recordings, and Cannon and the others play personably throughout." The AllMusic review by David Nathan concluded: "Given the play list and the outstanding artists performing it, why any serious jazz collection would be without this classic album is difficult to comprehend."

== Track listing ==
Side one (1962 LP)
No.	Title	Writer(s)	Length
1.	"Save Your Love For Me"	Buddy Johnson	2:38
2.	"Teaneck"	Nat Adderley	4:30
3.	"Never Will I Marry"	Frank Loesser	2:16
4.	"I Can't Get Started"	Vernon Duke, Ira Gershwin	4:55
5.	"The Old Country"	Nat Adderley; Curtis Lewis	2:57
6.	"One Man's Dream"	Joe Zawinul; Charles Wright	5:09

Side two (1962 LP)
No.	Title	Writer(s)	Length
1.	"Happy Talk"	Richard Rodgers, Oscar Hammerstein II	2:21
2.	"Never Say Yes"	Nat Adderley	3:57
3.	"The Masquerade Is Over"	Herb Magidson, Allie Wrubel	4:15
4.	"Unit 7"	Sam Jones	6:04
5.	"A Sleepin' Bee"	Harold Arlen, Truman Capote	2:32
Total length:			41:34

1993 CD
No.	Title	Writer(s)	Length
1.	"Save Your Love for Me"	Buddy Johnson	2:38
2.	"Never Will I Marry"	Frank Loesser	2:16
3.	"The Old Country"	Nat Adderley; Curtis Lewis	2:57
4.	"Happy Talk"	Richard Rodgers; Oscar Hammerstein II	2:21
5.	"The Masquerade Is Over"	Herb Magidson; Allie Wrubel	4:15
6.	"A Sleepin' Bee"	Harold Arlen; Truman Capote	2:32
7.	"Little Unhappy Boy" (Previously unissued CD bonus track)	Curtis Lewis	2:14
8.	"Teaneck"	Nat Adderley	4:30
9.	"I Can't Get Started"	Vernon Duke; Ira Gershwin	4:55
10.	"One Man's Dream"	Joe Zawinul; Charles Wright	5:09
11.	"Never Say Yes"	Nat Adderley	3:57
12.	"Unit 7"	Sam Jones	6:04
Total length:			43:48

== Personnel ==
- Nancy Wilson – vocals (tracks: 1 to 7, CD 1993)
- Cannonball Adderley – alto saxophone
- Nat Adderley – cornet
- Louis Hayes – drums
- Sam Jones – double bass
- Joe Zawinul – piano
- Tom Morgan – producer
