= Yesterday's Love Songs/Today's Blues =

Studio album by Nancy Wilson
- Released: December 1963
- Recorded: October 8–10, 1963
- Genre: Vocal jazz
- Length: 42:05
- Label: Capitol
- Producer: Tom Morgan

Nancy Wilson chronology
Hollywood – My Way (1963)	Yesterday's Love Songs/Today's Blues (1963)	Today, Tomorrow, Forever (1964)

Professional ratings
Review scores
Source	Rating
Allmusic	3/5 stars
The Virgin Encyclopedia of Jazz	4/5 stars

Yesterday's Love Songs/Today's Blues is a 1963 studio album by Nancy Wilson, arranged by Gerald Wilson. It was her highest charting album, entering the Billboard Top 200 on January 25, 1964, and ultimately reaching No. 4. It remained on the chart for 42 weeks. The 1991 CD edition featured a different cover image and added five bonus tracks drawn from other sessions with Gerald Wilson (two from the album How Glad I Am, and three from singles).

== Track listing ==
Original release
No.	Title	Writer(s)	Length
1.	"The Song Is You"	Oscar Hammerstein II, Jerome Kern	1:58
2.	"The Very Thought of You"	Ray Noble	2:51
3.	"Satin Doll"	Duke Ellington, Johnny Mercer, Billy Strayhorn	2:21
4.	"Bewitched, Bothered and Bewildered"	Lorenz Hart, Richard Rodgers	3:02
5.	"Sufferin' with the Blues"	Teddy "Cherokee" Conyers, Lloyd Pemberton	2:10
6.	"Someone to Watch over Me"	George Gershwin, Ira Gershwin	2:31
7.	"The Best Is Yet to Come"	Cy Coleman, Carolyn Leigh	2:18
8.	"Never Let Me Go"	Ray Evans, Jay Livingston	2:29
9.	"Send Me Yesterday"	J. H. Smith	2:12
10.	"All My Tomorrows"	Sammy Cahn, Jimmy Van Heusen	2:40
11.	"Please Send Me Someone to Love"	Percy Mayfield	2:33
12.	"Blue Prelude"	Joe Bishop, Gordon Jenkins	2:53

Bonus tracks on CD reissue
No.	Title	Writer(s)	Length
1.	"What Are You Doing New Year's Eve?"	Frank Loesser	2:23
2.	"Show Goes On" (from How Glad I Am)	Bernard Roth	2:48
3.	"West Coast Blues" (from How Glad I Am)	Wes Montgomery	2:01
4.	"Tell Me the Truth"	H. Jackson, D. D. Jackson	2:34
5.	"My Sweet Thing"		2:21

== Personnel ==
=== Performance ===
- Nancy Wilson – vocals
- Teddy Edwards – tenor saxophone
- Harold Land – tenor saxophone
- Paul Horn – alto saxophone
- Joe Maini – alto saxophone
- Don Raffell – baritone saxophone
- Al Porcino – trumpet
- Carmell Jones – trumpet
- John Ewing – trombone
- Wild Bill Davis – organ
- Jack Wilson – piano
- Joe Pass – guitar
- Jimmy Bond – double bass
- Kenny Dennis – drums
- Gerald Wilson – arranger, conductor
