= The Swingin's Mutual! =

Studio album by George Shearing, Nancy Wilson
- Released: March 1961
- Recorded: June 29 and July 5–6, 1960, January 7, 1961
- Studio: Capitol (Hollywood)
- Genre: Jazz
- Label: Capitol ST-1524
- Producer: Pete Welding

George Shearing, Nancy Wilson chronology
Satin Affair (1961)	The Swingin's Mutual! (1961)	Concerto for My Love (1962)

Nancy Wilson chronology
Something Wonderful (1960)	The Swingin's Mutual! (1961)	Nancy Wilson/Cannonball Adderley (1961)

Professional ratings
Review scores
Source	Rating
AllMusic	4.5/5 stars
DownBeat	2.5/5 stars
New Record Mirror	4/5
The Virgin Encyclopedia of Jazz	4/5 stars

The Swingin's Mutual! is an album by the George Shearing quintet, accompanied on the original 1961 release on six songs by the vocalist Nancy Wilson.

== Reception ==
The initial Billboard review from March 13, 1961, commented of Wilson's singing that "These are standout renditions by the youthful thrush, in which she offers fanciful, stylised and sometimes moody interpretations as "Born to Be Blue", "The Things We Did Last Summer", "Let's Live Again" and "On Green Dolphin Street". The contemporaneous DownBeat reviewer concluded: "This is a pleasant, at times, even enjoyable album. The biggest flaw is its superficiality and lack of real effort on the parts of two fine artists [Shearing and Wilson]".

== Track listing (1997 Jazz Heritage CD reissue) ==
1. "The Things We Did Last Summer" (Sammy Cahn, Jule Styne) – 2:41
2. "All Night Long" (Curtis Reginald Lewis) – 3:06
3. "Gentleman Friend" (Arnold B. Horwitt, Richard Lewine) – 2:03
4. "Born to Be Blue" (Mel Tormé, Robert Wells) – 2:14
5. "I Remember Clifford" (Benny Golson) – 2:35
6. "On Green Dolphin Street" (Bronisław Kaper, Ned Washington) – 2:22
7. "Let's Live Again" (Milt Raskin, George Shearing) – 2:21
8. "Whisper Not" (Golson) – 2:50
9. "The Nearness of You" (Hoagy Carmichael, Washington) – 2:58
10. "Evansville" (Marjorie Ericsson) – 2:03
11. "Don't Call Me" (Ericsson) – 2:46
12. "Inspiration" (George Shearing) – 2:14
13. "You Are There" Cy Walter, Chilton Ryan) – 2:08
14. "Wait till You See Her" (Lorenz Hart, Richard Rodgers) – 2:49
15. "Blue Lou" (Irving Mills, Edgar Sampson) – 2:16
16. "Oh! Look at Me Now" (Joe Bushkin, John DeVries) – 2:11
17. "Lullaby of Birdland" (Shearing, George David Weiss) – 2:22

== Personnel ==
=== Performance ===
- Nancy Wilson – vocals (tracks 1–4, 6, 7 & 9)
- The George Shearing Quintet:
- George Shearing – piano
- Dick Garcia – guitar
- Warren Chiasson or Eddie Costa – vibraphone
- Raplh Peña or George Duvivier – double bass
- Armando Peraza – percussion
- Vernel Fournier or Walter Bolden – drums

=== Production ===
- Michael Cuscuna – producer
- Pete Welding – producer, liner notes

Recorded in Los Angeles, May 1964.
