= Nancy Wilson (jazz singer) =

American jazz singer (1937–2018)

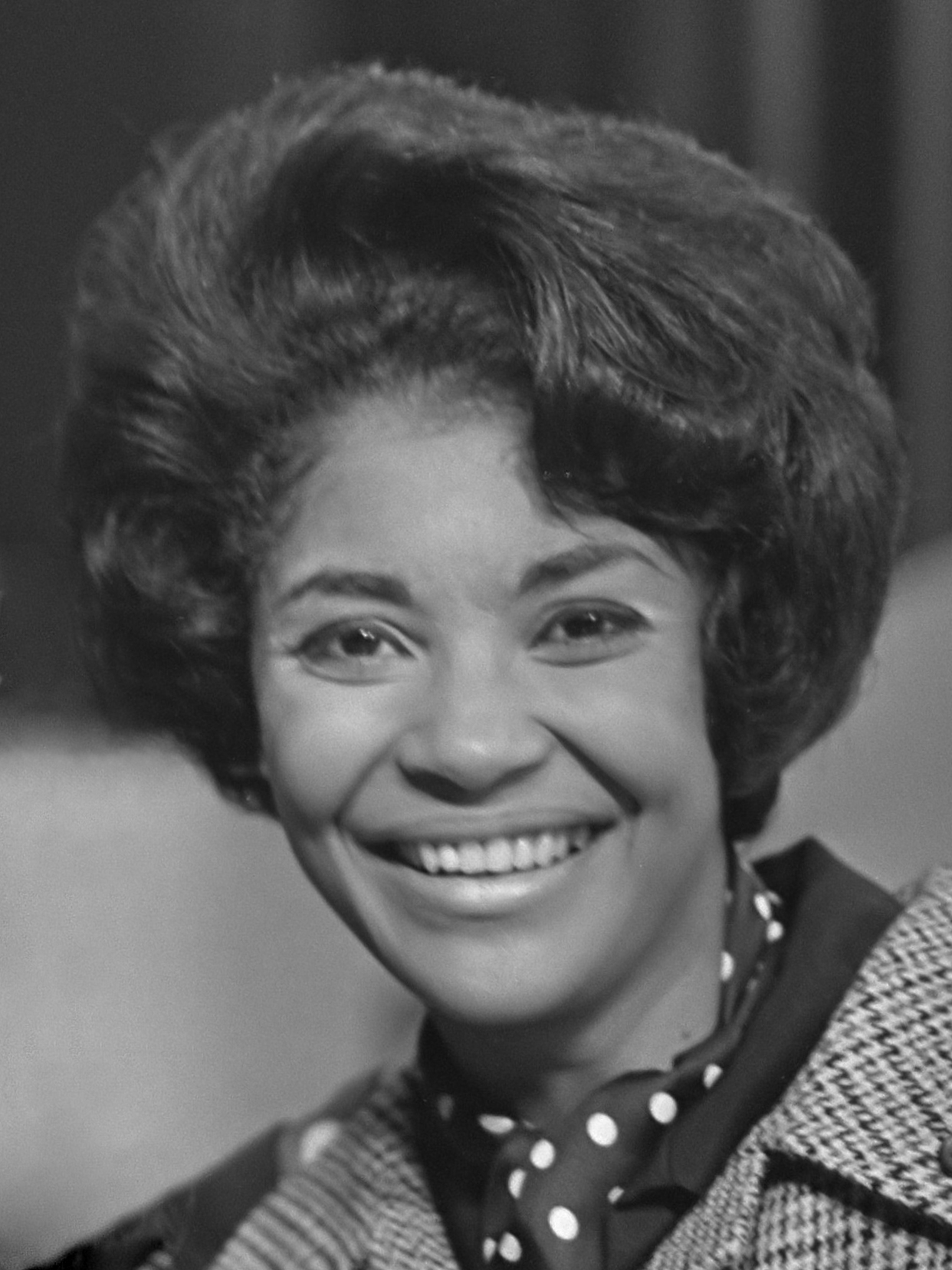
- Wilson in 1968
- Born: Nancy Sue Wilson; February 20, 1937; Chillicothe, Ohio, U.S.
- Died: December 13, 2018 (aged 81); Pioneertown, California, U.S.
- Occupations: Singer; actress
- Years active: 1956–2011
- Spouses: Kenny Dennis (m. 1960; div. 1970) Wiley Burton (m. 1974; died 2008)
- Children: 3
- Musical career
- Genres: R&B; soul; pop; jazz; blues
- Instrument: Vocals
- Labels: MCG Jazz; Capitol; Sony Records; Columbia Records; Blue Note

Nancy Sue Wilson (February 20, 1937 – December 13, 2018) was an American singer whose career spanned over five decades, from the mid-1950s until her retirement in the early 2010s. She was especially notable for her single "(You Don't Know) How Glad I Am" and her version of the standard "Guess Who I Saw Today". Wilson recorded more than 70 albums and won three Grammy Awards for her work. During her performing career, Wilson was labeled a singer of blues, jazz, R&B, pop, and soul; a "consummate actress"; and "the complete entertainer". The title she preferred, however, was "song stylist". She received many nicknames including "Sweet Nancy", "The Baby", "Fancy Miss Nancy" and "The Girl With the Honey-Coated Voice".

== Early life ==
Nancy Wilson was born on February 20, 1937, in Chillicothe, Ohio, to Olden Wilson, an iron foundry worker, and Lillian Ryan.

Wilson attended Burnside Heights Elementary School and developed her singing skills by participating in church choirs. She attended West High School in Columbus, Ohio where she won a talent contest and was rewarded with a role as a host for a local television show. She then went on to attend Ohio's Central State University where she pursued her B.A. degree in education.

== Career ==
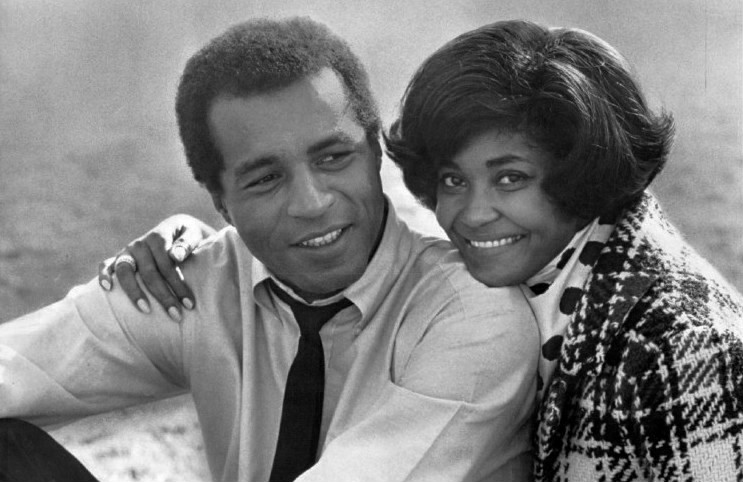
Wilson with Lloyd Haynes in a guest appearance on TV's Room 222 (1970)

When Wilson met Julian "Cannonball" Adderley, he suggested she move to New York City for career opportunities. In 1959 she moved to New York to try to hire Adderley's manager and get a contract with Capitol Records. Within four weeks of her arrival she got her first big break, a call to fill in for Irene Reid at The Blue Morocco. The club booked Wilson on a permanent basis; she was singing four nights a week and working as a secretary for the New York Institute of Technology during the day. John Levy sent demos of "Guess Who I Saw Today", "Sometimes I'm Happy", and two other songs to Capitol Records. The label signed her in 1960.

Wilson's debut single, "Guess Who I Saw Today", was so successful that between April 1960 and July 1962 Capitol Records released five Nancy Wilson albums. Her first album, Like in Love, displayed her talent in rhythm and blues. Adderley suggested that she should steer away from her original pop style and gear her music toward jazz and ballads. In 1962 their collaboration produced the album Nancy Wilson and Cannonball Adderley, which propelled her to national prominence with the hit R&B song, "Save Your Love For Me"; Wilson would later appear on Adderley's live album In Person (1968). Between March 1964 and June 1965, four of Wilson's albums hit the Top 10 on Billboard's Top LPs chart. In 1963 "Tell Me The Truth" became her first truly major hit, leading up to her performance at the Coconut Grove in 1964 – the turning point of her career, garnering critical acclaim from coast to coast. TIME said of her, "She is, all at once, both cool and sweet, both singer and storyteller." In 1964 Wilson released what became her most successful hit on the Billboard Hot 100 with "(You Don't Know) How Glad I Am", which peaked at No. 11. From 1963 to 1971 Wilson logged 11 songs on the Hot 100, including two Christmas singles. However, "Face It Girl, It's Over" was the only remaining non-Christmas song to crack the Top 40 for Wilson (No. 29 in 1968).

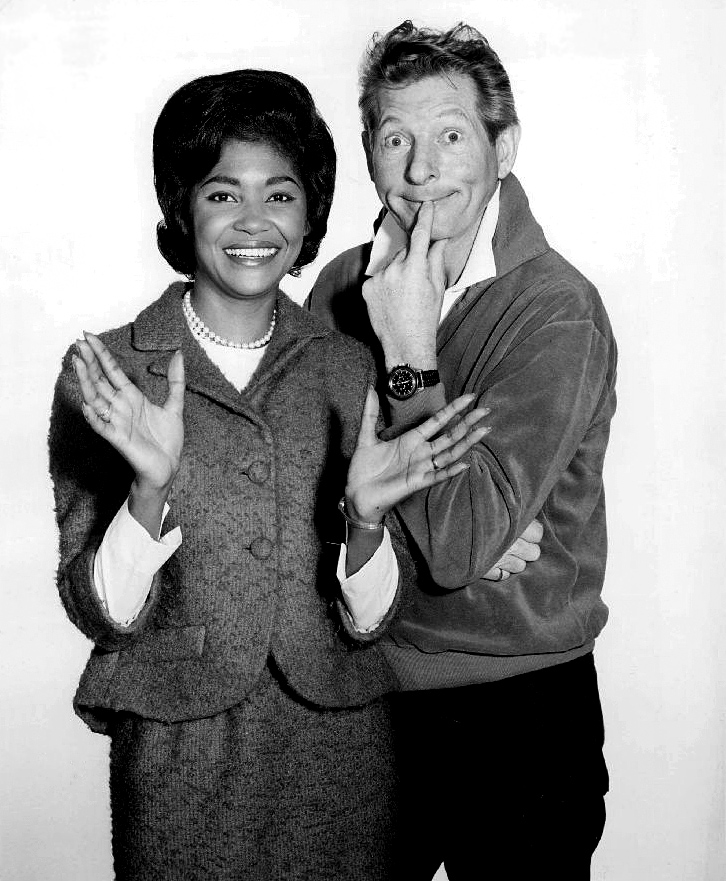
Wilson and Danny Kaye, 1965

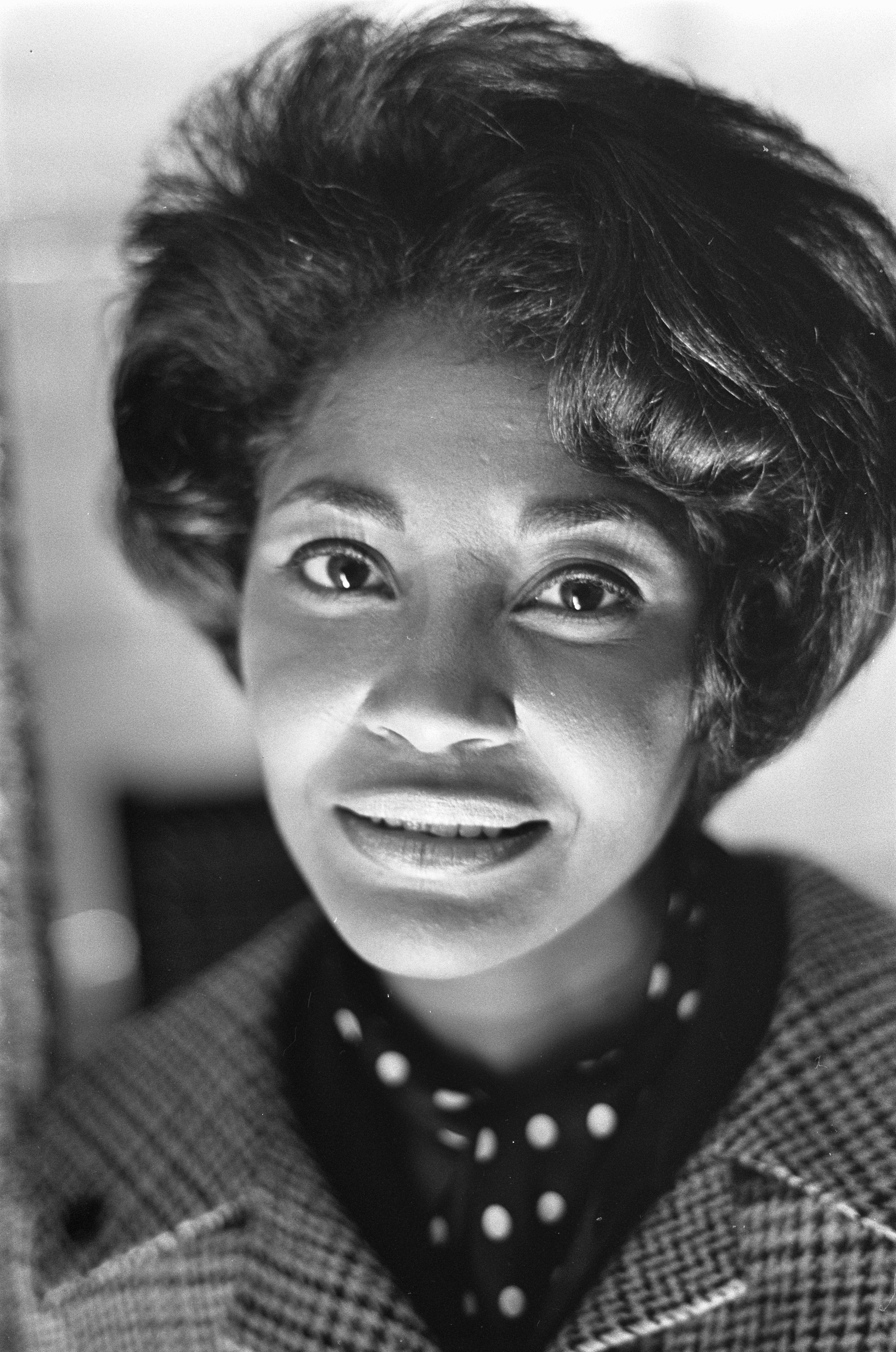
Wilson in March 1968

After making numerous television guest appearances, Wilson eventually got her own series on NBC, The Nancy Wilson Show (1967–1968), which won an Emmy. Over the years she appeared on many popular television shows such as I Spy (more or less playing herself as a Las Vegas singer in the 1966 episode "Lori" and as a similar character in the 1973 episode "The Confession" of The F.B.I.), Room 222, Hawaii Five-O, Police Story, The Jack Paar Program, The Sammy Davis Jr. Show (1966), The Danny Kaye Show, The Smothers Brothers Comedy Hour, Kraft Music Hall, The Sinbad Show, The Cosby Show, The Andy Williams Show, The Carol Burnett Show, Soul Food, New York Undercover, Moesha, and The Parkers. She was a guest on numerous popular variety and talk shows including The Ed Sullivan Show, The Merv Griffin Show, The Tonight Show, The Arsenio Hall Show, and The Flip Wilson Show. She was featured in Robert Townsend's 1993 film The Meteor Man and in The Big Score. She also appeared on The Lou Rawls Parade of Stars and the March of Dimes Telethon.

She was signed by Capitol Records in the late 1970s, and in an attempt to broaden her appeal, she released Life, Love and Harmony, an album of soulful, funky dance cuts that included the track "Sunshine", which was to become one of her most sought-after recordings (albeit among supporters of the rare soul scene with whom she would not usually register). In 1977 she recorded the theme song for The Last Dinosaur, a made-for-TV movie which opened in theaters in Japan.

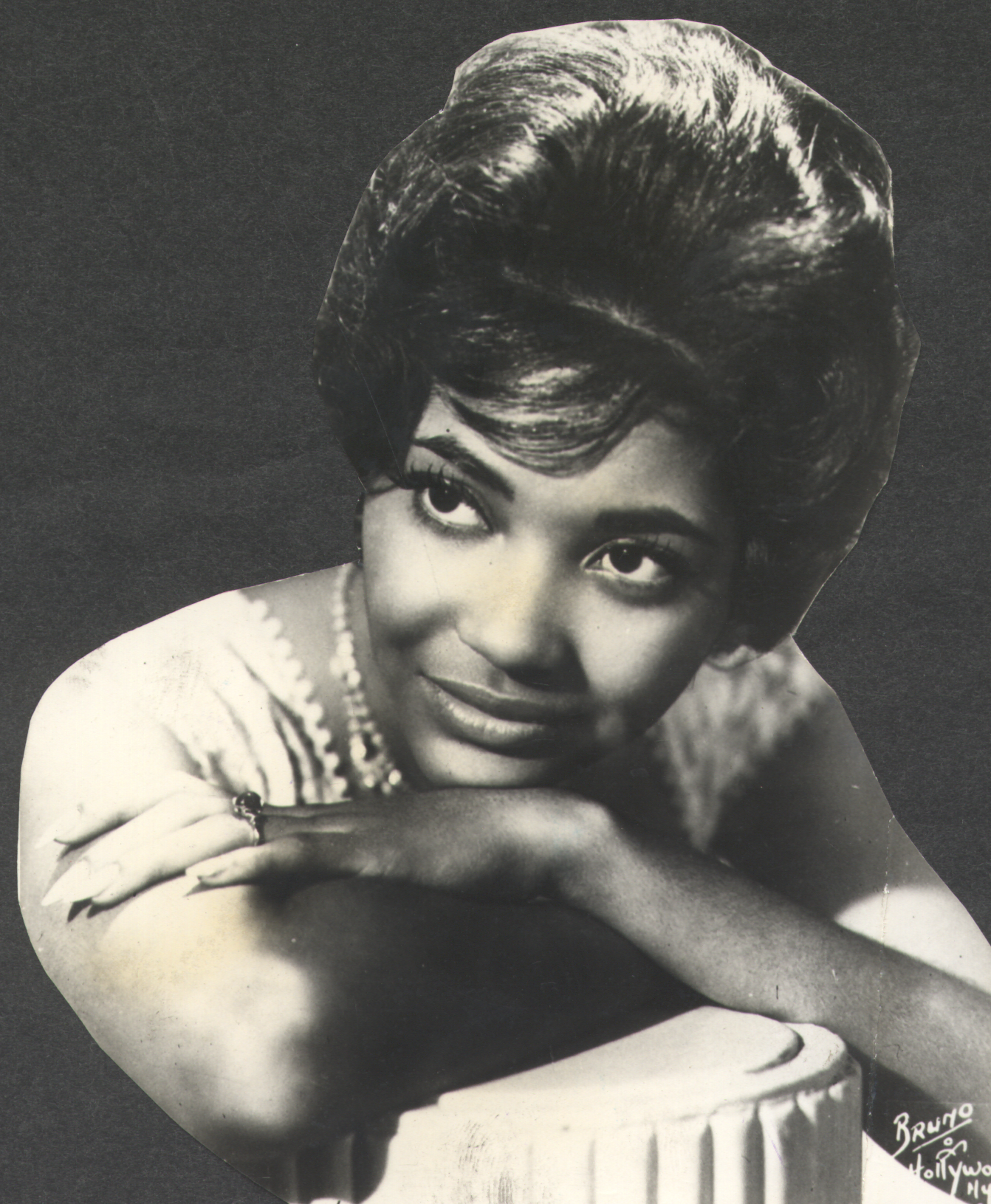
An undated photo of Wilson from the National Archives of Brazil

In the 1980s she recorded five albums for Japanese labels because she preferred recording live, and American labels frequently did not give her that option. She gained such wide popularity that she was selected as the winner of the annual Tokyo Song Festivals.

In 1982 Wilson recorded with Hank Jones and the Great Jazz Trio. In that same year she recorded with the Griffith Park Band, with members Chick Corea and Joe Henderson, and she signed with CBS Records. Her album releases included The Two of Us (1984), duets with Ramsey Lewis produced by Stanley Clarke; Forbidden Lover (1987), including the title-track duet with Carl Anderson; and A Lady with a Song, which became her 52nd album release in 1989. She participated in the PBS show Newport Jazz '87 as the singer of a jazz trio with John Williams and Roy McCurdy. In 1989 Nancy Wilson in Concert played as a television special.

In the early 1990s Wilson recorded an album paying tribute to Johnny Mercer with co-producer Barry Manilow entitled With My Lover Beside Me. During this decade she also recorded two other albums, Love, Nancy and her sixtieth album If I Had My Way. In the late 1990s she teamed up with MCG Jazz, a youth-education program of the Manchester Craftsmen's Guild, a non-profit, minority-directed arts and learning organization located in Pittsburgh, Pennsylvania.

Wilson performed at the New Orleans Jazz & Heritage Festival in 1995 and at the San Francisco Jazz Festival in 1997. In 1999 she hosted a show in honor of Ella Fitzgerald entitled Forever Ella on the A&E Network. All the proceeds from 2001's A Nancy Wilson Christmas went to support the work of MCG Jazz. Wilson was the host for NPR's Jazz Profiles from 1996 to 2005. This series spotlighted the legends and legacy of jazz through music, interviews, and commentary. Wilson and the program were the recipients of the George Foster Peabody Award in 2001. Wilson's second and third albums with MCG Jazz, R.S.V.P. (Rare Songs, Very Personal) (2005) and Turned to Blue (2007), both won the Grammy Award for Best Jazz Vocal Album. On September 10, 2011, she performed on a public stage for the last time at Ohio University in Athens, Ohio. According to Wilson, "I'm not going to be doing it anymore, and what better place to end it than where I started – in Ohio."

== Awards ==
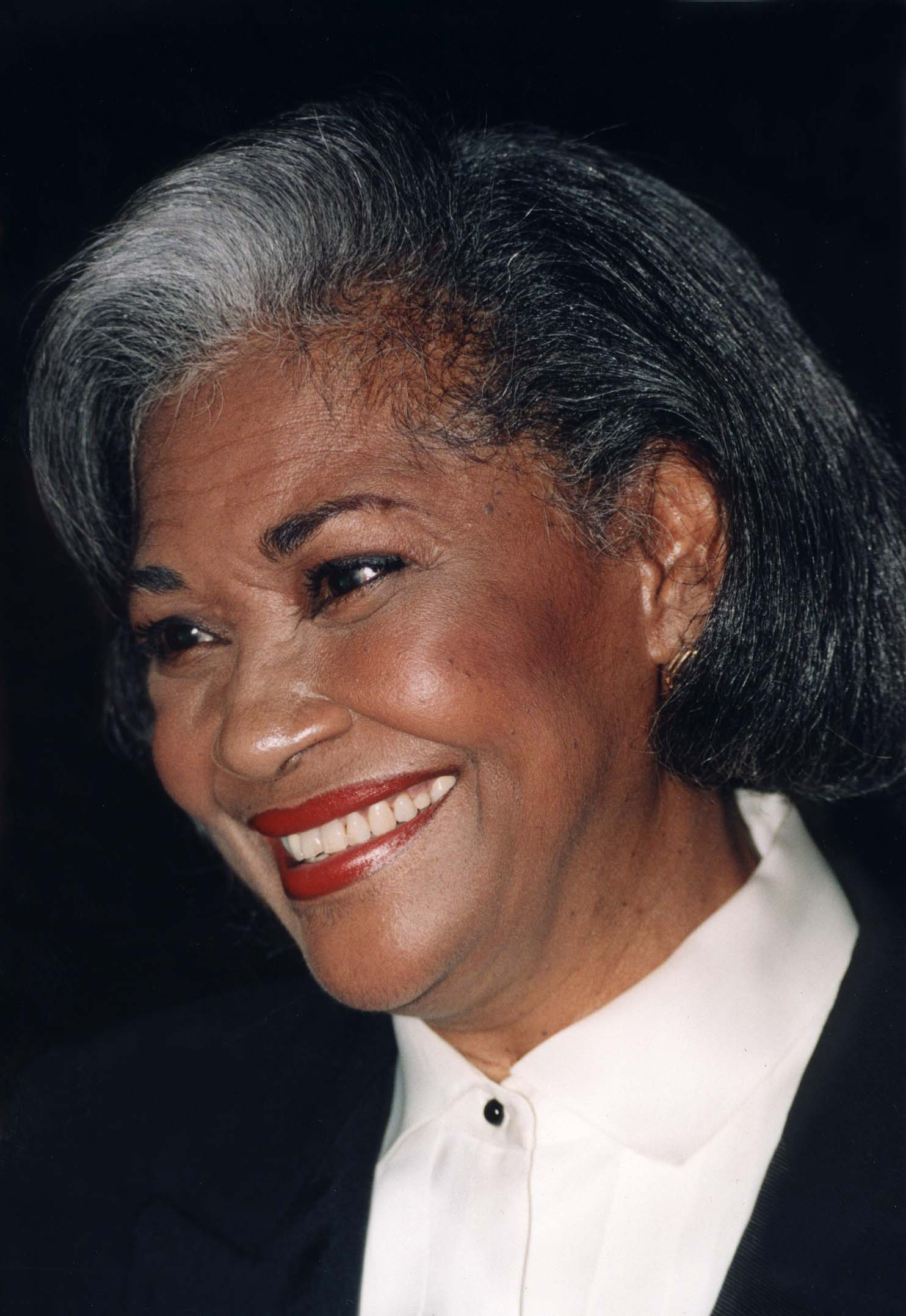
Wilson in 1997

In 1964 Wilson won her first Grammy Award for the Best Rhythm & Blues recording for the album How Glad I Am. She was featured as a "grand diva" of jazz in a 1992 edition of Essence. In the same year, she also received the Whitney Young Jr. Award from the Urban League. In 1998 she was a recipient of the Playboy Reader Poll Award for best jazz vocalist.

In 1986 she was dubbed the Global Entertainer of the Year by the World Conference of Mayors. She received an award from the Martin Luther King Jr. Center for Nonviolent Social Change in 1993, the NAACP Image Award – Hall of Fame Award in 1998, and was inducted into the Big Band and Jazz Hall of Fame in 1999. She received the Trumpet Award for Outstanding Achievement in 1994. Wilson received a star on the Hollywood Walk of Fame in 1990 at 6541 Hollywood Boulevard. She received honorary degrees from Berklee College of Music in Boston, Massachusetts, and Central State University in Wilberforce, Ohio. She is also a member of the Delta Sigma Theta sorority. Wilson has a street named after her in her hometown of Chillicothe, Ohio. She co-founded the Nancy Wilson Foundation, which introduces inner-city children to the country. Wilson was the recipient of the National Endowment for the Arts' (NEA) NEA Jazz Masters Fellowships award in 2004, the highest honors that the United States government bestows upon jazz musicians. In 2005 she received the NAACP Image Awards for Best Recording Jazz Artist. She received the 2005 UNCF Trumpet Award celebrating African-American achievement, a Lifetime Achievement Award from the NAACP in Chicago, and Oprah Winfrey's Legends Award.

In September 2005 Wilson was inducted into the International Civil Rights Walk of Fame at the Martin Luther King Jr. National Historic Site. Wilson was a major figure in the Civil Rights Movement. Wilson noted that the event gave her "one of the best ceremonies that I've ever had in my life." Times.com, August 20, 2006, wrote: "It's been a long career for the polished Wilson, whose first albums appeared in the 1960s, and she faces that truth head-on in such numbers as 'These Golden Years' and 'I Don't Remember Ever Growing Up'. Shorter breathed these days, she can still summon a warm, rich sound and vividly tell a song's story. With a big band behind her in 'Taking a Chance on Love', she also shows there's plenty of fire in her autumnal mood". At the Hollywood Bowl on August 29, 2007, Wilson celebrated her 70th birthday with an all-star event hosted by Arsenio Hall. Ramsey Lewis and his trio performed "To Know Her Is To Love Her".

== Life and death ==
Wilson and her first husband, drummer Kenny Dennis, were married in 1960. They had a son, Kenneth ("Kacy") Dennis Jr., but by 1970 they had divorced.

Within a month of their first meeting, Wilson married Reverend Wiley Burton, a Presbyterian minister, on May 22, 1974. She gave birth to Samantha Burton in 1975, and the couple adopted Sheryl Burton in 1976.

As a result of her marriage she abstained from performing in various venues such as supper clubs. For the following two decades she successfully juggled her personal life and her career. Both of her parents died in November 1998; she called this year the most difficult of her life.

Wilson was hospitalized with anemia and potassium deficiency and was on I.V. sustenance while she was undergoing a complete battery of tests in August 2006. She was unable to attend the UNCF Evening of Stars Tribute to Aretha Franklin and had to cancel the engagement. All of her other engagements were on hold pending doctors' reports.

She was hospitalized for lung complications in March 2008 but recovered and was reported to be doing well. Later that year her husband, Wiley Burton, died after suffering from renal cancer. Wilson died after a long illness at her home in Pioneertown, California, on December 13, 2018. She was 81 years old.

== Grammy history ==
- Career wins: 3
- Career nominations: 7 (Note: In a 2007 interview, Wilson stated that she had been nominated more than 20 times. However, the Grammy Awards web site lists seven nominations for Wilson.)

Nancy Wilson Grammy History (wins only)
Year	Category	Genre	Title	Label	Result
2007	Best Jazz Vocal Album	Jazz	Turned to Blue	MCG Jazz	Winner
2005	Best Jazz Vocal Album	Jazz	R.S.V.P. (Rare Songs, Very Personal)	MCG Jazz	Winner
1965	Best Rhythm & Blues Recording	R&B	"How Glad I Am"	Capitol	Winner

== Discography ==
- Like in Love (1959)
- Something Wonderful (1960)
- The Swingin's Mutual! (with George Shearing) (1961)
- Nancy Wilson/Cannonball Adderley (1962)
- Broadway – My Way (1963)
- Hollywood – My Way (1963)
- Yesterday's Love Songs/Today's Blues (1964)
- Today, Tomorrow, Forever (1964)
- The Nancy Wilson Show! (1965)
- From Broadway with Love (1966)
- A Touch of Today (1966)
- Tender Loving Care (1966)
- Nancy – Naturally (1966)
- Lush Life (1967)
- Welcome to My Love (1967)
- Just for Now (1967)
- Easy (1968)
- The Sound of Nancy Wilson (1968)
- Nancy (1968)
- Son of a Preacher Man (1968)
- Hurt So Bad (1969)
- Can't Take My Eyes Off You (1970)
- Now I'm a Woman (1970)
- But Beautiful (1971)
- I've Never Been to Me (1977)
- Life, Love and Harmony (1979)
- A Lady with a Song (1989)
- With My Lover Beside Me (1991)
- Love, Nancy (1994)
- If I Had My Way (1997)
- A Nancy Wilson Christmas (2001)
- R.S.V.P. (Rare Songs, Very Personal) (2004)
- Turned to Blue (2006)

== Filmography ==
=== Film ===
Year	Title	Role	Notes
1964	The Killers	Singer	uncredited
1983	The Big Score	Angie Hooks	
1993	The Meteor Man	Mrs. Laws	
2005	The Naked Brothers Band: The Movie	Herself	

=== Television ===
Year	Title	Role	Notes
1965	Burke's Law	Choo Choo	Episode: "Who Killed Wimbledon Hastings?"
1966	I Spy	Lori	Episode: Lori
1966–1967	The Red Skelton Show	Singer/Store Detective/Dr. Cagney	Episode: "The Bum Who Came in from the Cold" (1966); Episode: "Clothes Make the Bum" (1967)
1968	That's Life	Lillian Moore	Episode: "Bachelor Days"; Episode: "How We Met"
1968	The Carol Burnett Show	Herself	Guest starring with Lucille Ball and Eddie Albert; Guest starring with Mickey Rooney
1970	Room 222	Michelle Scott	Episode: "Play It Loose"
1970	The Carol Burnett Show	Herself	Guest starring with Nanette Fabray
1970	Hawaii Five-O	Eadie Jordan	Episode: "Trouble In Mind"
1972	O'Hara, U.S. Treasury	Poppy Grant	Episode: "Operation: Rake-Off"
1973	Search	Sugar Francis	Episode: "The Mattson Papers"
1973	The F.B.I.	Darlene Clark	Episode: "The Confession"
1974	Police Story	Kelly Craig	Episode: "World Full of Hurt"
1989	It's a Living	Ivy Reynolds	Episode: "The Ginger's Mother Show"
1989	The Cosby Show	Lorraine Kendall	Episode: "Grampy and NuNu Visit the Huxtables"
1993–1994	The Sinbad Show	Louise Bryan	9 episodes
1995–1997	The Parent 'Hood	Dr. Carolyn Plemmer/Elizabeth	Episode: "The Paw That Rocks the Cradle" (1995); Episode: "Mother and Law" (1997)
1996	Moesha	Singer	Episode: "A Concerted Effort" (1996)
2001	The Parkers	Aunt Rita	Episode: "Family Ties and Lies"

=== DVD concert films ===
- Nancy Wilson at Carnegie Hall (2001)
- Great Women Singers of the 20th Century – Nancy Wilson (2005)
