= Love, Nancy =

Studio album by Nancy Wilson
- Released: May 1994
- Recorded: 1994
- Genre: Vocal jazz
- Label: Columbia
- Producer: Andre Fischer

Nancy Wilson chronology
Nancy Wilson Live in Europe (1994)	Love, Nancy (1994)	The Best of Nancy Wilson: The Jazz and Blues Sessions (1996)

Singles from Love, Nancy
- 1. "Love Won't Let Me Wait" Released: 1994

Love, Nancy is a 1994 album by Nancy Wilson.

"Love Won't Let Me Wait" was released as the album's only single in 1994. It reached no. 31 on the Billboard Adult R&B Airplay chart, and no. 64 on the R&B/Hip-Hop Airplay chart.

== Critical reception ==
Professional ratings
Review scores
Source	Rating
AllMusic	3/5 stars
The Charlotte Observer	4/4 stars
Lexington Herald-Leader	3.5/4 stars
Miami Herald	Favorable
The Province	4/4 stars

Love, Nancy received mostly positive reviews from music critics upon its release, most of whom complimented Wilson's vocal performance. Writing for the Miami Herald, Mario Tarradell stated that Wilson is "adept at taking others' tunes and molding them around her expressive pipes, setting her own mood." Karl Stark of Lexington Herald-Leader stated that Wilson's voice sounds "as silken as ever", with arrangements that "enhance her already sophisticated aura". In The Province, Renee Doruyter stated that Love, Nancy "demonstrates the reasons for her longevity", and that Wilson's strength "is the way she makes you believe the words". In another rave review for The Charlotte Observer, Sheila Solomon described the album as "a powerful collection of love songs", commending Wilson's enunciation.

In a retrospective review, AllMusic's Ron Wynn stated that "Andre Fischer's production lets Wilson's still enchanting, powerful voice dominate the orchestrations," concluding that while there are "occasional tasty instrumental contributions from selected guest stars [...] for the most part it's Wilson's warm, inviting leads that make this CD so delightful."

== Track listing ==
No.	Title	Writer(s)	Length
1.	"Love Dance"	Ivan Lins; Gilson Peranzzetta; Paul Williams	4:29
2.	"Day Dream"	Duke Ellington; John Latouche	5:12
3.	"Love, I Found You"	Danny Small	4:02
4.	"I Can't Make You Love Me"	Mike Reid; Allen Shamblin	5:19
5.	"Loving You"	Artie Butler; Norman Martin	4:09
6.	"First Time on a Ferris Wheel"	Harriet Schock; Misha Segal	4:26
7.	"More Love"	Segal	4:05
8.	"Where in the World"	Diane Louie	3:36
9.	"I Remember"	Stephen Sondheim	4:15
10.	"Love Won't Let Me Wait"	Vinnie Barrett; Bobby Eli	4:11
11.	"Magic Door"	Yves Gilbert; Serge Lama; Clyde Otis	3:15
12.	"Your Arms of Love"	BeBe Winans	4:19

== Charts ==
Chart (1994)	Peak position
US Contemporary Jazz Albums (Billboard)	6
US Jazz Albums (Billboard)	6
US Top R&B/Hip-Hop Albums (Billboard)	63

== Credits and personnel ==
Adapted from album liner notes.

=== Musicians ===
- Nancy Wilson – lead vocals (all tracks)
- Randy Waldman – piano (1–2, 4–6, 10), synthesizer (2), arrangement (3, 6, 11), programming (3, 6), string arrangement (8), all instruments (11)
- Jimmy Johnson – bass (1, 5, 7)
- Andre Fischer – drums (1, 3, 7, 10), arrangement (2, 12)
- Gerald Albright – saxophone (1, 7), alto sax solo (1)
- Jeremy Lubbock – arrangement (1, 4, 7), string arrangement (9)
- Jim Hughart – bass (2)
- John Chiodini – guitar (2)
- Roy McCurdy – drums (2)
- Neil Stubenhaus – bass (4)
- Ndugu Chancler – drums (4)
- Carlos Vega – drums (5)
- Richard Evans – arrangement (5)
- Diane Louie – arrangement (8), piano (8), synthesizer (8)
- Tom Keane – synth bass (8), drum programming (8)
- Dennis Budimir – solo guitar (9)
- Ian Prince – arrangement (10), programming (10)
- Jerry Peters – arrangement (12), piano (12)
- Linda McCrary – background vocals (12)
- Terry Young – background vocals (12)
- Bridgette Bryant – background vocals (12)
- Bobbette Harrison – background vocals (12)
- Mona Lisa Young – background vocals (12)
- Ricky Nelson – background vocals (12)
- Maxi Anderson – background vocals (12)

==== Strings ====
- Assa Drori – violin, concert master
- Israel Baker – violin
- Isabelle Daskoff – violin
- Mark Cargill – violin
- Yvette Deveraux – violin
- Irving Geller – violin
- Gina Kronstadt – violin
- Gordon Marron – violin
- Mari Tsumura – violin
- Shari Zippert – violin
- Henry Ferber – violin
- Irving Cellar – violin
- Juliann French – violin
- Don Palmer – violin
- Kwihee Shamban – violin
- Elizabeth Wilson – violin
- Ron Clark – violin
- Miran Kojian – violin
- Haim Shtrum – violin
- Marilyn Baker – viola
- Margot MacLaine – viola
- Herschel Wise – viola
- Rollice Dale – viola
- Kenneth Burward-Hoy – viola
- James Ross – viola
- Evan Wilson – viola
- Fred Seykora – cello
- Suzie Katayama – cello
- Larry Corbett – cello
- Ernest Ehrhardt – cello
- Raymond Kelly – cello
- David Shamban – cello
- Todd Hemmenway – cello
- Daniel Smith – cello
- Christian Kollgaard – double bass
- Norman Ludwin – double bass
- Edward Meares – double bass
- Susan Ranney – double bass

==== Brass and woodwind ====
- John Mitchell – saxophone
- Richard Mitchell – saxophone
- John Yoakum – saxophone
- Calvin Smith – French horn
- Gregory Williams – French horn
- Oscar Brashear – trumpet
- Frank Szabo – trumpet

=== Technical ===
- Dr. George Butler – executive producer
- Al Schmitt – engineering, mixing
- Jeffrey "Woody" Woodruff – engineering (3, 6, 10, 12), mixing (3, 6, 10, 12)
- Alan Sides – engineering
- Doug Rider – engineering
- Kenny Deranteriasian – assistant engineering
- John Hendrickson – assistant engineering
- Brett Swain – assistant engineering
- Jeff Shannon – assistant engineering
- Richard Landers – assistant engineering
- Ulrich Wild – assistant engineering
- Patty Nichols – production coordinator
- Keith Petrie – assistant to Andre Fischer
- Jules Chaikin – contractor
- John Levy – management

=== Design ===
- Nancy Donald – art direction
- Charles Bush – photography
- George Blodwell – stylist
- Cloutier Roebuck – stylist
- Edward Roebuck – stylist
- John Atchison – hair
- Rudy Calvo – makeup
- Johnnetta B. Cole – liner notes
