= Manchester Craftsmen's Guild =

Nonprofit art, education & music organization

Coordinates: 40.457356°N 80.032431°W

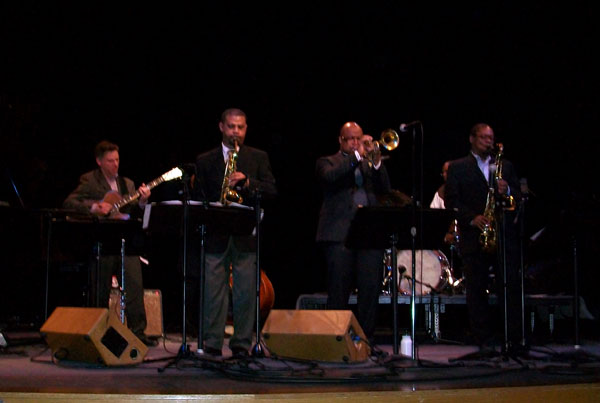
The Blue Note 7 performed at the Manchester Craftsmen's Guild on April 4, 2009.

Manchester Craftsmen's Guild (MCG) is a nonprofit art, education, and music organization established in Pittsburgh, Pennsylvania, in 1968.

Courses include ceramics, photography, digital arts, and design to over 500 young people each year and 3,400 additional students in the Pittsburgh Public Schools. Ninety percent of the students receive high school diplomas, and eight-five percent of those students enroll in college or some other secondary education. The Guild's programs also include MCG Jazz, MCG Youth, and the Denali Initiative. MCG Jazz's mission is to preserve, present and promote jazz. MCG Youth offers art courses to Pittsburgh public school students. The Denali Initiative is a program that teaches nonprofit executive directors how to develop business and financing plans for social enterprises.

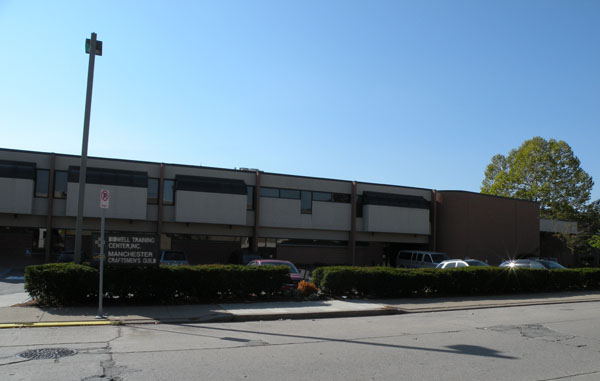
The Manchester Craftsmen's Guild at 1815 Metropolitan St. in Pittsburgh

The organization was conceived by Bill Strickland. In 1987, he expanded MCG with a $7.5 million capital campaign to construct a 62,000-square-foot (5,800 m^{2}) vocational education and arts center. It includes a 350-seat concert hall, an art gallery, classrooms, and workshops. MCG Jazz hosts concerts and has a recording studio and record label.
