= Dave Cavanaugh =

American composer (1919–1981)

David Cavanaugh, also known as Dave Cavanaugh or occasionally Big Dave Cavanaugh, (March 13, 1919 – December 31, 1981) was an American composer, arranger, musician and producer.

== Early career ==
Born in Saint Paul, Minnesota, Cavanaugh became a session tenor saxophone player in California in his mid-twenties, working with numerous bands, including those of Eddie Miller, Bobby Sherwood, Benny Carter and Woody Herman.

Amongst the singers whose work he backed in the late 1940s were Sammy Davis Jr., Ella Mae Morse and, as part of a group called Ten Cats & A Mouse, Peggy Lee.

As "Big Dave" Cavanaugh, he also released singles such as "Big Dave's Special" / "One Stop" and "The Cat from Coos Bay" / "Loosely with Feeling".

== Capitol ==
In the early 1950s, Cavanaugh became a Director of A & R (Artists and Repertoire) for Capitol Records, where, during a stint that would endure to the end of his career, he signed artists such as Dakota Staton, Donna Hightower, Nancy Wilson, Plas Johnson and Sandler & Young.

He became one of the label's main producers, becoming responsible for the output of top artists such as Nat "King" Cole, Stan Kenton, Peggy Lee, Kay Starr, Billy May, Sandler and Young and Frank Sinatra and winning a Grammy in 1959 for producing Sinatra's album Come Dance with Me!. Other Capitol artists for whom he was arranger or producer included Helen Forrest and George Shearing.

=== As arranger ===
Cavanaugh worked as arranger on several sessions, most notably on Nat "King" Cole's 1958 album Welcome to the Club, on which Cole was backed by the Count Basie Orchestra, though not, for contractual reasons, by Basie himself.

In a less serious vein, Cavanaugh also arranged Sinatra's spoof doo-wop single, "Two Hearts, Two Kisses (Make One Love)", with a Capitol session group called the Nuggets.

== The Top of the Tower ==
In the 1970s, Cavanaugh became President of Capitol Records, with whom he remained associated until his death on New Year's Eve 1981 at Tarzana Hospital of heart complications following surgery in Tarzana, Los Angeles, California.

== Other work ==
Cavanaugh also worked with Warner Brothers Animation on the cartoons Happy Hippety Hopper and Snowbound Tweety as both producer and composer. Wild West Henry Haw, Bugs Bunny & The Pirate and Tweety's Good Deed also used Cavanaugh's music.
