= I've Never Been to Me (album) =

1977 album by Nancy Wilson

Studio album by Nancy Wilson
- Released: June 1977
- Venue: Los Angeles
- Genre: R&B, soul
- Length: 37:46
- Label: Capitol
- Producer: Gene Page, Billy Page

Nancy Wilson chronology
This Mother's Daughter (1976)	I've Never Been to Me (1977)	Music on My Mind (1978)

I've Never Been to Me is a studio album by American singer Nancy Wilson, released by Capitol Records in June 1977. It was produced by Gene and Billy Page, who had previously worked with Wilson on All in Love Is Fair (1974) and Come Get to This (1975). Gene Page also served as arranger and conductor for most songs. Garry Sherman produced and arranged four songs. As with most of Wilson's albums from the 1970s, I've Never Been to Me features more of an R&B and soul music sound.

== Reception ==
Professional ratings
Review scores
Source	Rating
AllMusic	2.5/5 stars
The Virgin Encyclopedia of Jazz	3/5 stars

Upon the album's initial release in 1977, Stereo Review featured it in their "Recordings of Special Merit Best of the Month" section, stating, "Nancy Wilson has finally become herself, and the lady is simply dynamite. Her stunning performance of the title song here is probably the best thing she's done yet. It's a tough, world-weary, and worldly wise song. . . . Wilson sings it with an overriding tone of furious exasperation with herself and with all of life's unsatisfying surface pleasure." They also praised her work on "Patience My Child" and "Love Is Alive." The review concluded by saying, "Nancy Wilson has now joined that select bevy of ladies . . . Lena Horne, Peggy Lee, Ella Fitzgerald, Barbra Streisand, Carmen McRae, and Mabel Mercer."

In July 1977, Billboard reviewed the album in its "Recommended LPs" section, saying, "The musicianship surrounding this singer is superior" and that the production is "equally impressive." They added, however, that the "selection of material does not for the most part complement her rich vocal style." They mentioned "All By Myself," "Changes," "Nobody," and the title track as "Best Cuts."

More recently, Jason Ankeny at AllMusic praised Wilson's earlier work with producer-arranger Gene Page but said I've Never Been to Me was "undermined by overbaked, pop-inspired production and lackluster material," with a "gauzy, sleepily mellow sound that's more tepid than sophisticated." He did hail Wilson's version of the title song, saying she strips away "layers of camp to reveal the song's unflinching intimacy and emotional depth."

== Reissues ==
In 2012, SoulMusic Records released a digitally remastered version of I've Never Been to Me, paired with This Mother's Daughter, Wilson's previous album. A streaming version of the original album became available in 2016.

== Track listing ==
=== Side 1 ===
1. "Flying High" (Lamont Dozier)- 3:48
2. "All By Myself" (T. Robinson, S. Schreer) - 2:35
3. "Love Is Alive" (Gary Wright) - 3:57
4. "Car of Love" (Ray Parker Jr.) - 4:12
5. "I've Never Been to Me" (Ken Hirsch, Ron Miller) - 3:48

=== Side 2 ===
1. "Changes" (C. Palmard, J. Levine) - 2:38
2. "Patience My Child" (Billy Page, Nancy Wilson) - 5:18
3. "Nobody" (A. Paris, R. Tener) - 4:05
4. "Here It Comes" (Elgin, Loeffler, Schreer) - 3:10
5. "Moments" (Elgin, Sherman, Loeffler) - 4:15

== Personnel ==
- Nancy Wilson – vocals
- Gene Page – keyboards
- Sonny Burke – keyboards
- Ray Parker Jr. – guitar
- David T. Walker – guitar
- Jay Graydon – guitar
- Henry Davis – bass
- Wilton Felder – bass
- James Gadson – drums
- Jack Ashford – percussion
- Paulinho da Costa – percussion
- Gene Cirpiano – English horn
- Plas Johnson – flute
- Ernie Watts – soprano saxophone
- Alex Brown – background vocals
- Augie Johnson – background vocals
- Jim Gilstrap – background vocals
- John Lehman – background vocals
- Mortonette Jenkins – background vocals
- Oma Drake – background vocals
- Patricia Hall – background vocals

=== Technical personnel ===
- Gene Page – producer, arranger, and conductor (tracks 1,3-5,7-8)
- Billy Page – producer (tracks 1,3-5,7-8)
- Garry Sherman – producer and arranger (tracks 2,6,9-10)
- Stanley Kahan Associates – producer (tracks 2,6,9-10)
- Harry Bluestone – concertmaster
- Gary Chester – engineer (tracks 2,6,9-10)
- Greg Venable – engineer (tracks 1,3-5,7-8)
- Reggie Dozier – engineer (tracks 1,3-5,7-8)
- John Golden – mastering engineer
- Larkin Arnold – executive producer

== Charts ==
I've Never Been to Me peaked at No. 42 on Billboard's Soul LPs chart, but only reached No. 198 on the Billboard 200. The title song reached No. 47 on Billboard's Best Selling Soul Singles, remaining on the charts for 13 weeks.
