= Mayuto Correa =

Mayuto Correa (born 9 March 1943) is a Brazilian percussionist, guitarist, and composer.

== Life and career ==
Correa was born in São Gonçalo, Rio de Janeiro and began playing in local bands from the age of 12 when he became a member of the big band Rapazes da Alvorada. At age 16 he formed the ensemble Samba Show with musicians from Niterói and made several recordings for the CBS label with them. He also played for the under-17 squad of the Brazil national football team. In the 1960s Correa was the artistic director of Pontifical Catholic University of Rio de Janeiro where he wrote and directed several plays. During this time, he also made several recordings in Brazil and worked as the musical director for the shows of Maria Bethânia, Elza Soares, and Eliana Pittman as well as playing in Roberto Carlos's ensemble RC-7 and performing in Chacrinha's television shows.

In 1969 he left Brazil for Mexico where he worked with the Brazilian bossa nova group Tamba 4 before moving to the United States. He established himself as a musician in Los Angeles in the early 1970s. According to jazz writer Leonard Feather, Correa had become "a vital figure in hundreds of major and minor albums taped in Los Angeles" by 1977. During that period he also toured live with many of the artists with whom he recorded and became the record producer for the Argentine group Arco Iris. He returned to Brazil in 1972 when he was touring with Carlos Santana and again in 1979 when he appeared on the Rede Globo television show Sexta Super.

Among his compositions is the soundtrack for the 1979 documentary Homeboys depicting Chicano youth gang culture in East Los Angeles. In the later years of his career, Correa has performed with his bands Mayuto & Genuises 2000, Mayuto & The Dream Team Big Band, and Mayuto & Samba Pack. He has also had small acting roles in the film Redeemed (2014) and the television series Community (2015).

== Discography ==
Correa's extensive discography as a percussionist includes:

- José José's debut studio album José José (1969). Label: RCA Victor
- Paulo Moura's Pilantrocracia (1971). Label: Equipe
- Howard Roberts's Equinox Express Elevator (1972). Label: Impulse! Records
- Charles Lloyd's Waves (1972). Label: A&M Records
- Nat Adderley's Soul of the Bible (1972). Label: Capitol Records
- Cannonball Adderley's The Happy People (1972). Label: Capitol Records
- Cal Tjader and Charlie Byrd's Tambu (1973). Label: Fantasy Records
- Cal Tjader's Last Bolero in Berkeley (1973). Label: Fantasy Records
- Etta James's Come a Little Closer (1974). Label: Bellaphon Records
- Goldie Zelkowitz's Goldie Zelkowitz (1974). Label: Bellaphon Records
- Miriam Makeba's A Promise (1974). Label: Amiga Records
- Gábor Szabó's Live With Charles Lloyd (1974). Label: Blue Thumb Records
- Gato Barbieri's Chapter Two: Hasta Siempre (1974). Label: Impulse! Records
- Kenny Burrell's Up the Street, 'Round the Corner, Down the Block (1974). Label: Fantasy Records
- Ray Manzarek's The Golden Scarab (1974). Label: Mercury Records
- Moacir Santos 's Saudade (1974). Label: Blue Note Records
- Donald Byrd's Stepping into Tomorrow (1974). Label: Blue Note Records
- Kenny Rankin's Inside (1975). Label: Little David Records
- Henry Mancini & His Concert Orchestra's Symphonic Soul (1975). Label: RCA Victor Records
- Jon Lucien's Song For My Lady (1975). Label: Columbia Records
- Freddie Hubbard's Liquid Love (1975). Label: Columbia Records
- Richard "Groove" Holmes's Six Million Dollar Man (1975). Label: Flying Dutchman Records
- The Waters's Waters (1975). Label: Blue Note Records
- Yvonne Elliman 's Small Town Talk (1975). Label: RSO Records
- Shelly Manne's Hot Coles (1975). Label: RCA Victor, Flying Dutchman Records
- John Prine's Common Sense (1975). Label: Atlantic Records
- Donald Byrd's Places and Spaces (1975). Label: Blue Note Records
- David Axelrod's Seriously Deep (1975). Label: Polydor Records
- Bobbi Humphrey's Fancy Dancer (1975). Label: Blue Note Records
- Donald Byrd's Caricatures (1976). Label: Blue Note Records
- Gene Harris's In a Special Way (1976). Label: Blue Note Records
- Les Dudek's debut solo album Les Dudek (1976). Label: Columbia Records
- James Vincent's Space Traveler (1976). Label: Caribou Records
- Jorge Calderón's City Music (1976). Label: Warner Bros. Records
- John Prine's The Best Of John Prine (1976). Label: Atlantic Records
- Johnny Hammond's Forever Taurus (1976). Label: Milestone Records
- David Axelrod's Strange Ladies (1977). Label: MCA Records
- Keni Burke's debut solo album Keni Burke (1977). Label: Dark Horse Records
- Syreeta's One To One (1977). Label: Tamla Records
- Burt Bacharach's Woman (1978). Label: A&M Records
- Jerry Lynn Williams's Easy On Yourself (Gone) (1979). Label: Warner Bros. Records
- Ronnie Laws's Mr. Nice Guy (1983). Label: Capitol Records
- Various Blue Break Beats (Volume 3) (1996). Label: Blue Note Records
- Gato Barbieri's Latino America (1997). Label: Impulse Records
- Various Blue Break Beats (Volume 1) (1999). Label: Blue Note Records
- Various Jazz Samba Vol. 2 (1999). Label: ZYX Music Records
- Jon Lucien's Motherland (1999). Label: Razor & Tie Records
- Jazz Crusaders's Life in the City (2000). Label: Indigo Blue Records
- Various Brazilian Flavour (2000). Label: Fantasy Records
- Various Gourmet Music Deluxe: Brazil (2001). Label: ZYX Music Records
- Various The Latin Tinge Series: Brazilian Flavour 2 (2002). Label: Fantasy Records
- Various Champagne Lounge(Weinwelt Edition) (2004). Label: Ayia Napa Records
- Howard Roberts's Antelope Freeway (2011). Label: Impulse Records
- Various Uncompromising Expression (2014). Label: Blue Note Records
