= All in Love Is Fair (album) =

1974 album by Nancy Wilson

Studio album by Nancy Wilson
- Released: August 1974
- Recorded: 1974
- Venue: Hollywood
- Studio: The Sound Factory
- Genre: R&B, soul
- Label: Capitol
- Producer: Gene Page

Nancy Wilson chronology
I Know I Love Him (1973)	All in Love Is Fair (1974)	Come Get to This (1975)

Professional ratings
Review scores
Source	Rating
Allmusic	4/5 stars
The Virgin Encyclopedia of Jazz	3/5 stars

All in Love Is Fair is a studio album by American singer Nancy Wilson, released by Capitol Records in August 1974. It was her first album with producer Gene Page, who also did the arrangements and conducting and gave the album a more R&B-oriented sound. Musicians on the album include Ray Parker Jr., Wah Wah Watson, and Tom Scott. Marvin Gaye is also listed on the back cover as "The Phantom," with "warmest thanks." All in Love Is Fair includes one of the few songs co-written by Wilson.

Jason Ankeny at AllMusic hails Wilson's "sultriness and soulfulness. Page swaddles the singer in billowing strings and slow-burn funk rhythms, weaving a series of luminously sensual backdrops that wouldn't be out of place on Motown or Philadelphia International." He also notes that "the music never veers so far into the mainstream that Wilson abandons her jazz roots entirely, and she brings to the songs the intelligence and articulateness one would expect."

All in Love Is Fair peaked at No. 11 on Billboard's Soul LPs chart and No. 97 on the Billboard 200. The song "Streetrunner" reached No. 46 on Billboard's Best Selling Soul Singles.

In 2011, SoulMusic Records released a digitally remastered version of the album, paired with Come Get to This, Wilson's next album, which was also produced by Gene Page.

== Track listing ==
=== Side 1 ===
1. "You're Right as Rain" (Linda Creed, Thom Bell) – 3:04
2. "Try It, You'll Like It" (Johnny "Guitar" Watson) – 4:46
3. "There'll Always Be Forever" ( Dee Ervin, DeeDee McNeil) – 3:00
4. "All in Love Is Fair" (Stevie Wonder) – 4:03
5. "Streetrunner" (Billy Page, Gene Page) – 3:22

=== Side 2 ===
1. "Ocean of Love" (Ray Parker Jr.) – 3:06
2. "To Make It Easier on You" (Jimmy Webb) – 4:14
3. "Tell the Truth" (Nancy Wilson, Tennyson Stevens) – 3:23
4. "My Love" (Paul McCartney) – 3:38

== Personnel ==
From the original liner notes:

- Nancy Wilson – vocals
- Larry Muhoberac – keyboards
- Michel Rubini – keyboards
- Sylvester Rivers – keyboards, rhythm charts
- Ray Parker Jr. – guitar
- David Cohen – guitar
- David T. Walker – guitar
- Wah Wah Watson – guitar
- Scott Edwards – bass
- Eddie Greene – drums
- Joe Clayton – congas
- Gary Coleman – percussionist
- George Bohanon – trombone soloist
- Gene Cirpiano – English horn soloist
- Tom Scott – flute, tenor saxophone, soprano saxophone

=== Technical personnel ===
- Gene Page – producer, arranger, conductor
- Billy Page – associate producer
- Larkin Arnold – executive producer
- David Hassinger – recording engineer
- Roy Kohara – art director
