= Astral Signal =

Studio album by Gene Harris
- Released: 1975
- Recorded: August 13, 1974
- Studios: The Village Recorder, Los Angeles, CA
- Genre: Jazz-funk
- Length: 40min 34sec
- Label: Blue Note / Capitol
- Producers: Keg Johnson, Jerry Peters, Jim Shifflett

Gene Harris chronology
Yesterday, Today & Tomorrow (1973)	Astral Signal (1975)	Nexus (1975)

Astral Signal is a soul/funk influenced jazz album recorded in 1974 by the jazz keyboard player Gene Harris.

Harris covered the Chicago tune "Beginnings" on this album, one of the very few times that Harris can be heard as a lead vocalist.

== Track listing ==
1. "Prelude" (Jerry Peters) - 1:38
2. "Summer (The First Time)" (Bobby Goldsboro) - 3:32
3. "Rebato Summer" (Peters) - 0:44
4. "I Remember Summer" (Peters) - 2:03
5. "Don't Call Me Nigger, Whitey" (Sly Stone) - 3:44
6. "Losalamitoslatinfunklovesong" (Peters) - 3:06
7. "My Roots" (Harris) - 4:15
8. "Green River" (John Fogerty) - 3:01
9. "Beginnings" (Robert Lamm) - 5:50
10. "Feeling You, Feeling Me Too!" (Monk Higgins, Alex Brown) - 1:57
11. "Higga-Boom" (Harvey Mason Sr.) - 5:57
12. "Love Talkin'" (Peters) - 4:47

== Personnel ==
- Gene Harris - keyboards, lead vocals
- Oscar Brashear - trumpet
- George Bohanon - trombone, backing vocals
- Keg Johnson - trombone, backing vocals
- Sidney Muldrow - flugelhorn
- Ernie Watts - reeds
- Jerry Peters - piano, backing vocals
- John Rowin - guitar
- David T. Walker - guitar
- Chuck Rainey - bass guitar
- Harvey Mason - drums
- Jim Shifflett - unknown instrument
- Trisha Chamberlain, Ann Esther Davis, Lynn Mack, Julia Tillman Waters, Luther Waters, Maxine Willard Waters, Oren Waters - backing vocals
