= Chuck Rainey =

American bass guitarist (born 1940)

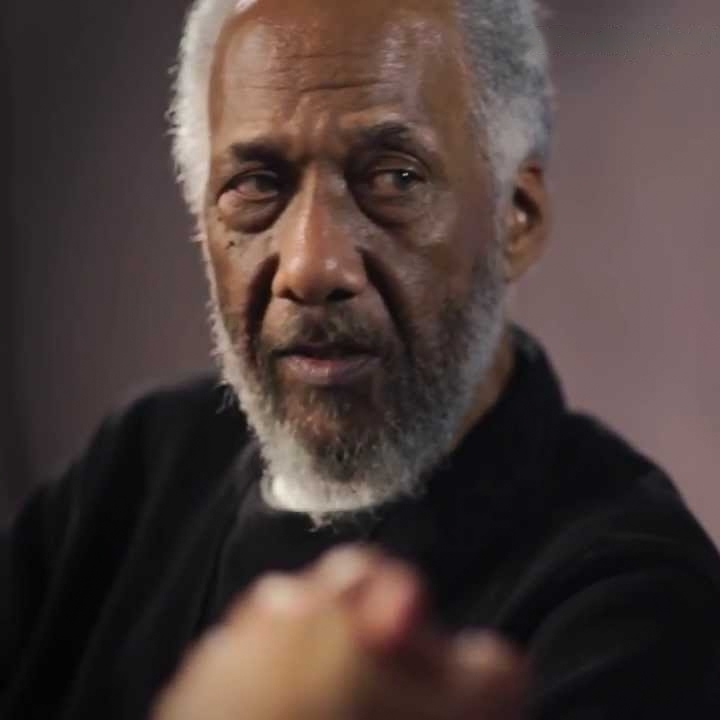
- Rainey at Detroit Bass Festival in 2013.

Background information
- Born: Charles Walter Rainey III; June 17, 1940 (age 86); Cleveland, Ohio, U.S.
- Genres: Jazz fusion; R&B; crossover jazz; soul
- Occupation: Musician
- Instrument: Bass guitar
- Website: https://chuckrainey.com/

Charles Walter Rainey III (born June 17, 1940) is an American bass guitarist who has performed and recorded with many well-known acts, including Aretha Franklin, Steely Dan, and Quincy Jones. Rainey is credited for playing bass on more than 1,000 albums, and is one of the most recorded bass players in the history of recorded music.

== Early life ==
Rainey was born in Cleveland, Ohio, on June 17, 1940, and grew up in Youngstown. His parents were both amateur pianists. He learned viola, piano, and trumpet as a child and majored in brass instruments in college. He attended Lane College in Jackson, Tennessee. Rainey began playing guitar in the military.

== Career ==
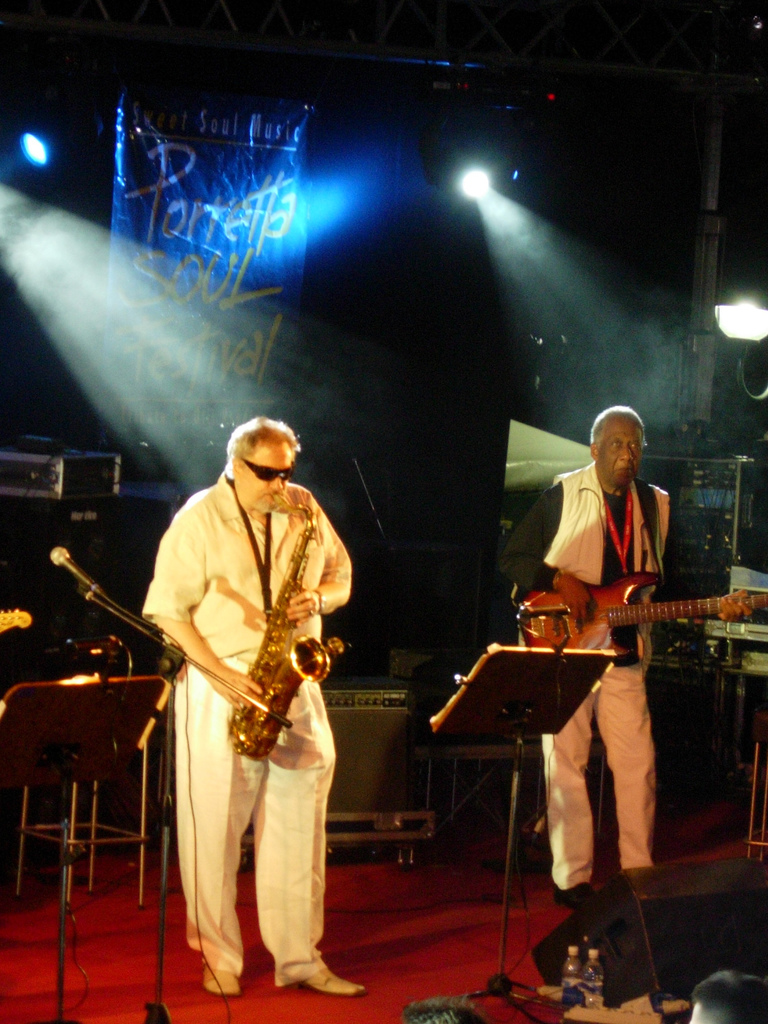
Rainey (right) and Ronnie Cuber at the Porretta Soul Festival 2005

After college he played guitar in a local band but had difficulty with some of the guitar chords due to the large size of his hands. His drummer suggested that he might try playing a bass guitar instead. He was twenty-one years old when he first picked up a bass. His first big professional gig was playing with Big Jay McNeely. He then joined up with Sil Austin to tour Canada and New York. In 1962, Rainey joined King Curtis and his All-Star band; in 1965, they opened for The Beatles' 1965 US tour. He joined Quincy Jones's big band in 1972. By the 1970s he had played with Jerome Richardson, Grady Tate, Mose Allison, Gato Barbieri, Gene Ammons, as well as with Eddie Vinson at the 1971 Montreux Festival, and on five albums by Steely Dan. Following the first breakup of Steely Dan, he played on one track of their co-leader Donald Fagen's debut solo album, but the session was stressful, and Rainey did not work with Steely Dan again.

Although many of his contributions were as a session player, Rainey recorded a solo album, The Chuck Rainey Coalition, in 1972. Other solo albums were Born Again (1982), Hangin' Out Right (1999), Sing & Dance (2001), and Interpretations of a Groove (2012).

Rainey wrote the five-volume Complete Electric Bass Player instructional books, and filmed instructional videos. The early bass curriculum at Musicians Institute and the Dick Grove School of Music were created by Rainey. He also wrote columns for Bass Player magazine from 1990–1992.

On November 5, 2011, Rainey had a stroke which paralyzed his left side. He spent four years receiving physical therapy and practicing meditation and Hatha yoga, and made a full recovery.

In 2014, Rainey and drummer John Anthony Martinez cofounded Rhythm Intensive, which provides clinics, workshops, and master classes for aspiring rhythm section musicians. Rainey and Martinez also co-authored The Tune of Success: Unmask Your Genius.

In an interview with Chris Jisi in April 2020, Rainey disclosed that he had retired as a bassist and turned his focus to writing his biography and leading Rhythm Intensive.

A Rainey signature line of bass guitars is produced by Alvarez Guitars and Ken Smith Basses.

Rainey received an honorary Doctor of Music degree from Berklee College of Music at a ceremony on May 7, 2022.

== Discography ==
=== As leader ===
- The Chuck Rainey Coalition (Skye, 1972)
- Born Again (Hammer 'N Nails, 1981)
- Coolin' 'N Groovin' (A Night at On-Air) with Bernard Purdie (Lexington, 1993)
- Chuck Rainey/David T. Walker Band with David T. Walker (Toy's Factory, 1994)
- Hangin' Out Right (CharWalt, 1998)
- Sing & Dance (CharWalt, 1999)
- Interpretations of a Groove (Vivid Sound, 2013)

=== As guest ===
With Alessi Brothers

- Driftin' (A&M Records, 1978)

With Louis Armstrong

- Louis Armstrong and His Friends (Flying Dutchman, 1970)

With Gato Barbieri

- El Pampero (Flying Dutchman, 1972)
- The Legend of Gato Barbieri (Flying Dutchman, 1973)
- Bolivia (RCA, 1985)
- The Third World Revisited (BMG, 1988)

With George Benson

- Goodies (Verve, 1968)

With Donald Byrd

- Black Byrd (Blue Note, 1973)
- Street Lady (Blue Note, 1973)
- Places and Spaces (Blue Note, 1975)
- Stepping into Tomorrow (Blue Note, 1975)

With David Castle

- Castle in the Sky (Parachute, 1977)
- Love You Forever (Parachute, 1979)

With Ray Charles

- A Message from the People (ABC, 1972)

With Joe Cocker

- I Can Stand a Little Rain (A&M, 1974)
- Jamaica Say You Will (A&M, 1975)
- Luxury You Can Afford (Asylum, 1978)

With Larry Coryell

- Coryell (Vanguard, 1969)
- Fairyland (Mega, 1971)
- Basics (Vanguard, 1976)

With The Crusaders

- Hollywood (MoWest, 1972)
- Crusaders 1 (Blue Thumb, 1972)
- The Golden Years (GRP, 1992)
- The Crusaders' Finest Hour (Verve, 2000)

With King Curtis

- Live at Small's Paradise (Atco, 1966)
- Get Ready (Atco, 1970)
- Everybody's Talkin' (Atco, 1972)
- Instant Groove (Edsel, 1990)

With Delaney & Bonnie

- D&B Together (Columbia, 1972)

With Cornell Dupree

- Teasin' (Atlantic, 1974)

With Aretha Franklin

- Young, Gifted and Black (Atlantic, 1972)
- With Everything I Feel in Me (Atlantic, 1974)
- Let Me in Your Life (Atlantic, 1974)
- Sweet Passion (Atlantic, 1977)

With Gene Harris

- Astral Signal (Blue Note, 1974)
- Nexus (Blue Note, 1975)
- In a Special Way (Blue Note, 1976)
- Tone Tantrum (Blue Note, 1977)

With Richard "Groove" Holmes

- Comin' on Home (Blue Note, 1971)
- Six Million Dollar Man (RCA, 1975)

With Bobbi Humphrey

- Blacks and Blues (Blue Note, 1973)
- Satin Doll (Blue Note, 1974)
- Fancy Dancer (Blue Note, 1975)

With Etta James

- Etta James (Chess, 1973)
- Come a Little Closer (Chess, 1974)
- Etta Is Betta Than Evvah! (Chess, 1976)
- Deep in the Night (Warner Bros., 1978)

With Quincy Jones

- Walking in Space (A&M, 1969)
- Smackwater Jack (A&M, 1971)
- You've Got It Bad Girl (A&M, 1973)
- Body Heat (A&M, 1974)
- Mellow Madness (A&M, 1975)
- I Heard That!! (A&M, 1976)
- Roots (A&M, 1977)

With Ben E. King

- What Is Soul (Atco, 1967)

With Yusef Lateef

- Yusef Lateef's Detroit (Atlantic, 1969)
- Suite 16 (Atlantic, 1970)
- The Gentle Giant (Atlantic, 1972)

With The McCrarys

- Loving is Living (Portrait, 1978)

With David "Fathead" Newman

- Bigger & Better (Atlantic, 1968)
- The Many Facets of David Newman (Atlantic, 1969)
- The Weapon (Atlantic, 1973)
- Return to the Wide Open Spaces with Ellis Marsalis and Cornell Dupree (Amazing, 1990)

With The Rascals

- Groovin' (Atlantic, 1967)
- Once Upon a Dream (Atlantic, 1968)
- Freedom Suite (Atlantic, 1969)
- See (Atlantic, 1969)
- Peaceful World (Columbia, 1971)
- Search and Nearness (Atlantic, 1971)

With Steely Dan

- Pretzel Logic (ABC, 1974)
- Katy Lied (ABC, 1975)
- The Royal Scam (ABC, 1976)
- Aja (ABC, 1977)
- Gaucho (MCA, 1980)

With Sadao Watanabe

- My Dear Life (Flying Disk, 1977)
- California Shower (Flying Disk, 1978)
- Nice Shot! (Flying Disk, 1980)

With Ernie Wilkins

- Blood, Sweat & Brass (Mainstream, 1970)
- Hard Mother Blues (Mainstream, 1970)
- Screaming Mothers (Mainstream, 1974)

With Bobby Womack

- I Don't Know What the World Is Coming To (United Artists, 1975)

With others

- Cannonball Adderley, The Happy People (Capitol, 1972)
- Mose Allison, Western Man (Atlantic, 1971)
- Gene Ammons, My Way (Prestige, 1971)
- Gene Ammons, Free Again (Prestige, 1972)
- Eric Andersen, Avalanche (Warner Bros., 1968)
- The Arbors, Featuring: I Can't Quit Her (Date, 1969)
- The Archies, Jingle Jangle (Kirshner, 1969)
- Patti Austin, End of a Rainbow (CTI, 1976)
- Harold Battiste, Melvin Lastie, Hal-Mel Alone Together (Opus 43, 1976)
- Maggie Bell, Queen of the Night (Atlantic, 1974)
- Brook Benton, Story Teller (Cotillion, 1971)
- Gene Bertoncini, Evolution! (Evolution, 1969)
- Bobby Bland, Reflections in Blue (ABC, 1977)
- Willie Bobo, A New Dimension (Verve, 1968)
- Terence Boylan, Terence Boylan (Asylum, 1977)
- Delaney Bramlett, Sounds From Home (Zane, 1998)
- Randy Brecker, Score (Solid State, 1969)
- Ray Bryant, MCMLXX (Atlantic, 1970)
- James Brown, Hell (Polydor, 1974)
- Oscar Brown, Brother Where Are You (Atlantic, 1974)
- Ruth Brown, Black Is Brown and Brown Is Beautiful (Skye, 1969)
- Jackson Browne, The Pretender (Asylum, 1976)
- Tim Buckley, Greetings from L.A. (Warner Bros., 1972)
- Tim Buckley, Look at the Fool (Discreet, 1974)
- Gary Burton, Good Vibes (Atlantic, 1970)
- Billy Butler, Yesterday, Today & Tomorrow (Prestige, 1970)
- Paul Butterfield, Put It in Your Ear (Bearsville, 1975)
- Charlie Byrd, The Great Byrd (Columbia, 1968)
- Andrés Calamaro, Alta Suciedad (Gasa, 1997)
- Cándido Camero, Thousand Finger Man (Solid State, 1970)
- Jim Capaldi, The Contender (Polydor, 1978)
- Valerie Carter, Just a Stone's Throw Away (Columbia, 1977)
- Valerie Carter, Wild Child (Columbia, 1978)
- David Clayton-Thomas, Tequila Sunrise (Columbia, 1972)
- David Clayton-Thomas, David Clayton–Thomas (RCA Victor, 1973)
- The Coasters, Young Blood (Atlantic, 1982)
- Ry Cooder, The Slide Area (Warner Bros., 1982)
- Hank Crawford, Mr. Blues Plays Lady Soul (Atlantic, 1969)
- Hank Crawford, It's a Funky Thing to Do (Cotillion, 1971)
- Fats Domino, Fats Is Back (Reprise, 1968)
- Les Dudek, Les Dudek (Columbia, 1976)
- Les Dudek, Say No More (Columbia, 1977)
- Cornell Dupree, Teasin' (Atlantic, 1974)
- Cornell Dupree, Bop 'N' Blues (Kokopelli, 1995)
- Betty Davis, Crashin' from Passion (P-Vine, 1995)
- Enchantment, Enchantment (United Artists, 1977)
- Eye to Eye, Eye to Eye (Warner Bros., 1982)
- Donald Fagen, The Nightfly (Warner Bros., 1982)
- Joe Farrell, Night Dancing (Warner Bros., 1978)
- Wilton Felder, Let's Spend Some Time (BCS, 2005)
- Roberta Flack, Chapter Two (Atlantic, 1970)
- Roberta Flack, Quiet Fire (Atlantic, 1971)
- Roberta Flack, Donny Hathaway, Roberta Flack & Donny Hathaway (Atlantic, 1972)
- The Free Design, Heaven/Earth (Project, 1969)
- Hiroshi Fukumura with Sadao Watanabe, Hunt Up Wind (Flying Disk, 1978)
- Marvin Gaye, I Want You (Tamla, 1976)
- Lowell George, Thanks, I'll Eat It Here (Warner Bros., 1979)
- Dizzy Gillespie, Cornucopia (Solid State, 1970)
- Dizzy Gillespie, The Real Thing (Perception, 1970)
- Dizzy Gillespie, Matrix (Castle Music, 2000)
- Jim Gold, I Can't Face Another Day Without You (Tabu, 1977)
- Grant Green, Visions (Blue Note, 1971)
- Arlo Guthrie, Last of the Brooklyn Cowboys (Reprise, 1973)
- Bobbye Hall, Body Language for Lovers (20th Century, 1977)
- John Hall, John Hall (Asylum, 1978)
- John Handy, Hard Work (ABC, 1976)
- Rufus Harley, King/Queens (Atlantic, 1970)
- Eddie Harris, Plug Me In (Atlantic, 1968)
- Donny Hathaway, Donny Hathaway (Atco, 1971)
- Richie Havens, Connections (Elektra, 1979)
- Hampton Hawes, Universe (Prestige, 1972)
- Edwin Hawkins, The Comforter (Birthright, 1977)
- Edwin Hawkins, Edwin Hawkins Presents The Matthew Sisters (Birtiright, 1977)
- Red Holloway, Red Soul (Prestige, 1966)
- Lena Horne and Gabor Szabo, Lena & Gabor (Skye, 1970)
- Freddie Hubbard, Liquid Love (Columbia, 1975)
- Paul Humphrey, Supermellow (Blue Thumb, 1973)
- Bobby Hutcherson, Linger Lane (Blue Note, 1975)
- Paul Jabara, Keeping Time (Casablanca, 1978)
- Ahmad Jamal, One (20th Century Fox, 1978)
- Tom Jans, The Eyes of an Only Child (CBS, 1975)
- Paul Jeffrey, Paul Jeffrey (Mainstream, 1974)
- Garland Jeffreys, Garland Jeffreys (Atlantic, 1973)
- Sammy Johns, Sammy Johns (GRC, 1973)
- J. J. Johnson and Kai Winding, Betwixt & Between (A&M, 1969)
- Rickie Lee Jones, Pirates (Warner Bros., 1981)
- Tamiko Jones, I'll Be Anything for You (A&M, 1968)
- Marc Jordan, Mannequin (Warner Bros., 1978)
- Margie Joseph, Margie Joseph (Atlantic, 1973)
- Margie Joseph, Sweet Surrender (Atlantic, 1974)
- Eric Kaz, If You're Lonely (Atlantic, 1972)
- Robin Kenyatta, Stompin' at the Savoy (Atlantic, 1974)
- Albert King, Truckload of Lovin' (Tomato, 1978)
- Bobby King and Terry Evans, Rhythm, Blues, Soul & Grooves (Special Delivery, 1990)
- John Klemmer, Touch (ABC, 1975)
- Gladys Knight & the Pips, At Last... The Pips (Casablanca, 1977)
- Al Kooper, You Never Know Who Your Friends Are (Columbia, 1969)
- Charles Kynard, Woga (Mainstream, 1972)
- Charles Kynard, Your Mama Don't Dance (Mainstream, 1973)
- Labelle, Moon Shadow (Warner Bros., 1972)
- Bill LaBounty, Bill LaBounty (Warner Bros., 1982)
- Hubert Laws, Laws' Cause (Atlantic, 1969)
- Peggy Lee, Let's Love (Atlantic, 1974)
- Claudia Lennear, Phew! (Warner Bros., 1973)
- Barbara Lewis, Workin' on a Groovy Thing (Atlantic, 1968)
- Lightnin' Rod, Hustlers Convention (Celluloid, 1973)
- Mike Lipskin, California Here I Come (Flying Dutchman, 1971)
- Little Feat, Hoy-Hoy! (Warner Bros., 1981)
- Nils Lofgren, Cry Tough (A&M, 1976)
- Lawrence Lucie, Mixed Emotions (Toy, 1979)
- Jon Lucien, Song for My Lady (Columbia, 1975)
- Jon Lucien, Premonition (Columbia, 1976)
- Cheryl Lynn, Cheryl Lynn (Columbia, 1978)
- Cheryl Lynn, In Love (Columbia, 1979)
- Ralph MacDonald, Sound of a Drum (Marlin, 1976)
- Ralph MacDonald, The Path (Marlin, 1978)
- Mike Mainieri, Journey Thru an Electric Tube (Solid State, 1968)
- Junior Mance, With a Lotta Help from My Friends (Atlantic, 1970)
- Melissa Manchester, Don't Cry Out Loud (Arista, 1978)
- Herbie Mann, Push Push (Embryo, 1971)
- Herbie Mann, Deep Pocket (Kokopelli, 1992)
- Bob Marley, Freedom Time (Fiftyfive, 2002)
- Esther Marrow, Sister Woman (Fantasy, 1972)
- Dave Mason, It's Like You Never Left (Columbia, 1973)
- Harvey Mason, Marching in the Street (Arista, 1975)
- Percy Mayfield, Weakness Is a Thing Called Man (RCA Victor, 1970)
- Percy Mayfield, Blues and Then Some (RCA Victor, 1971)
- Letta Mbulu, There's Music in the Air (A&M, 1976)
- Randy McAllister, Grease, Grit, Dirt & Spit (JSP, 1998)
- Randy McAllister, Double Rectified Bust Head (JSP, 1999)
- Les McCann, Another Beginning (Atlantic, 1974)
- Gary McFarland, Does the Sun Really Shine on the Moon? (Skye, 1968)
- Gary McFarland, America the Beautiful (Skye, 1969)
- Jimmy McGriff and Junior Parker, The Dudes Doin' Business (Capitol, 1970)
- Sérgio Mendes, Sergio Mendes (Elektra, 1975)
- Sérgio Mendes, Homecooking (Elektra, 1976)
- Bette Midler, Bette Midler (Atlantic, 1973)
- Bette Midler, Broken Blossom (Atlantic, 1977)
- Blue Mitchell, The Last Tango Blues (Mainstream, 1973)
- The Monkees, Changes (Colgems Records, 1970)
- Howdy Moon, Howdy Moon (A&M, 1974)
- Barbara Morrison, Love Is a Four-Letter Word (Esoteric, 1984)
- Barbara Morrison, Love'n You (P.C.H., 1990)
- Laura Nyro, Eli and the Thirteenth Confession (Columbia, 1968)
- Laura Nyro, Christmas and the Beads of Sweat (Columbia, 1970)
- Robert Palmer, Some People Can Do What They Like (Island, 1976)
- Felix Pappalardi, Don't Worry, Ma (A&M, 1979)
- Johnny Pate, Outrageous (MGM, 1970)
- Jim Pepper, Pepper's Pow Wow (Embryo, 1971)
- Armando Peraza, Wild Thing (Skye, 1969)
- Esther Phillips, Burnin (Atlantic, 1970)
- Esther Phillips, Confessin' the Blues (Atlantic, 1976)
- Pink Lady, America! America! America! (Victor, 1978)
- Billy Preston, Late at Night (Motown, 1979)
- Billy Preston, Pressin' On (Motown, 1982)
- Bernard Purdie, Stand By Me (Whatcha See Is Whatcha Get) (Mega, 1971)
- Bill Quateman, Shot in the Dark (RCA Victor, 1977)
- Helen Reddy, Reddy (Capitol Records, 1979)
- Della Reese, Let Me in Your Life (People, 1973)
- Little Richard, The Second Coming (Reprise, 1972)
- Jerome Richardson, Groove Merchant (Verve, 1967)
- Minnie Riperton, Stay in Love (Epic, 1977)
- Minnie Riperton, Minnie (Capitol, 1979)
- Lee Ritenour, First Course (Epic, 1976)
- Smokey Robinson, Love Breeze (Tamla, 1978)
- Smokey Robinson, Where There's Smoke... (Tamla, 1979)
- Tim Rose, Tim Rose (CBS, 1967)
- Sonny Rollins, Nucleus (Milestone, 1975)
- Diana Ross, Red Hot Rhythm & Blues (EMI, 1987)
- Jimmy Ruffin, Love Is All We Need (Polydor, 1975)
- Lara Saint Paul, Saffo Music (Lasapa, 1977)
- Mongo Santamaria, Mongo's Way (Atlantic, 1971)
- Merl Saunders, Fire Up (Fantasy, 1973)
- Leo Sayer, Endless Flight (Chrysalis, 1976)
- Leo Sayer, Leo Sayer (Chrysalis, 1978)
- Leo Sayer, Here (Chrysalis, 1979)
- Shirley Scott, Something (Atlantic, 1970)
- Tom Scott, Blow It Out (Epic, 1977)
- Don Sebesky, Don Sebesky & the Jazz Rock Syndrome (Verve, 1968)
- Don Sebesky, The Distant Galaxy (Verve, 1968)
- Marlena Shaw, Who Is This Bitch, Anyway? (Blue Note, 1975)
- The Singers Unlimited, Friends (Pausa, 1977)
- Johnny "Hammond" Smith, Gears (Milestone, 1975)
- Lonnie Smith, Drives (Blue Note, 1970)
- Lonnie Smith, Mama Wailer (Kudu, 1971)
- Soul Generation, Beyond Body and Soul (Ebony, 1972)
- Dusty Springfield, It Begins Again (United Artists, 1978)
- Ringo Starr, Ringo the 4th (Atlantic, 1977)
- The Supremes, Mary, Scherrie & Susaye (Motown, 1976)
- The Sylvers, Something Special (Capitol, 1976)
- Grady Tate, Windmills of My Mind (Skye, 1968)
- Howard Tate, Get It While You Can (Verve, 1967)
- Tavares, Future Bound (Capitol, 1978)
- Richard Tee, Strokin' (Tappan Zee, 1979)
- Carla Thomas, Memphis Queen (Stax Records, 1969)
- Cal Tjader, Solar Heat (Skye, 1968)
- Cal Tjader, Last Bolero in Berkeley (Fantasy, 1973)
- Allen Toussaint, Motion (Warner Bros., 1978)
- Diana Trask, Believe Me Now or Believe Me Later (Dot, 1976)
- Phil Upchurch, Feeling Blue (Milestone, 1968)
- Phil Upchurch, Darkness, Darkness (Blue Thumb, 1972)
- Frankie Valli, Closeup (Private Stock, 1975)
- Frankie Valli, Heaven Above Me (MCA Records, 1980)
- Sarah Vaughan, Sarah Vaughan with Michel Legrand (Mainstream, 1973)
- Tata Vega, Full Speed Ahead (Tamla, 1976)
- Tata Vega, Totally Tata (Tamla, 1977)
- Eddie "Cleanhead" Vinson, You Can't Make Love Alone (Mega, 1971)
- David T. Walker, On Love (A&M, 1976)
- Joe Walsh, Barnstorm (ABC, 1972)
- Leon Ware, Musical Massage (Gordy, 1976)
- Leon Ware, Leon Ware (Elektra, 1982)
- Tim Weisberg, Dreamspeaker (A&M, 1973)
- Jerry Lynn Williams, Jerry Williams (Spindizzy, 1972)
- Cris Williamson, Cris Williamson (Ampex, 1971)
- Nancy Wilson, This Mother's Daughter (Capitol, 1976)
- Jimmy Witherspoon, Spoonful (Blue Note, 1975)
- Syreeta Wright, One to One (Tamla, 1977)
- Miwa Yoshida, Beauty and Harmony (Epic, 1995)
- Masayoshi Takanaka, An Insatiable High (Kitty, 1977)
