= This Mother's Daughter =

1976 album by Nancy Wilson

Studio album by Nancy Wilson
- Released: April 1976
- Venue: Los Angeles
- Studio: Record Plant
- Genre: Vocal jazz, jazz-funk
- Length: 40:52
- Label: Capitol
- Producer: Eugene McDaniels

Nancy Wilson chronology
Come Get to This (1975)	This Mother's Daughter (1976)	I've Never Been to Me (1977)

Professional ratings
Review scores
Source	Rating
Allmusic	4/5 stars
The Virgin Encyclopedia of Jazz	3/5 stars

This Mother's Daughter is a 1976 studio album by Nancy Wilson. Produced by Eugene McDaniels, the album is more jazz-funk and jazz-fusion oriented than Wilson's earlier records, and features musicians such as Blue Mitchell, Steve Gadd, Dave Grusin, George Duke, and Hugh McCracken. Grusin serves as arranger for most of the tracks, with additional arrangements by Duke and McCracken. This Mother's Daughter is Wilson's first album with all 10 tracks being original songs. The album's themes are centered on love, relationships and motherhood.

In an AllMusic review, Jason Ankeny calls This Mother's Daughter "the most soulful record cut by Nancy Wilson during her Capitol tenure," and says that McDaniels' "subtle but ingenious jazz-funk flourishes are essential to the project's immediacy and appeal." Ankeny hails Wilson's performance as "sophisticated yet saucy."

== Track listing ==
=== Side 1 ===
1. "From You To Me To You" (Rachel Perry) – 3:54
2. "Love Has Smiled on Us" (Jon Mayer, Perry) – 3:48
3. "I Don't Want a Sometimes Man" (Perry) – 3:48
4. "Tree of Life" (Eugene McDaniels) – 4:19
5. "China" (Dennis Collins Johnson, McDaniels, John Wood) – 3:40

=== Side 2 ===
1. "Now" (Mayer, Marcia Hillman) – 4:54
2. "This Mother's Daughter" (McDaniels) – 3:55
3. "He Never Had It So Good" (Mayer, Perry) – 3:10
4. "When We Were One" (Mayer, Leida Snow) – 3:55
5. "Stay Tuned" (McDaniels, Perry) – 4:35

== Personnel ==
From the original liner notes:

- Nancy Wilson – vocals
- Blue Mitchell – flugelhorn solo
- Dave Grusin – piano, Fender Rhodes
- George Duke – piano, Fender Rhodes, Moog synthesizer, background vocals
- Hugh McCracken – guitar
- Jeff Miranoy – guitar
- Chuck Rainey – bass guitar
- Steve Gadd – drums
- Oliver C. Brown – percussion
- Eugene McDaniels – background vocals
- Morgan Ames – background vocals, arranger of background vocals
- Carolyn Willis – background vocals
- Jackie Ward – background vocals
- Lisa Roberts – background vocals
- Carla Bee – background vocals
- Afreeka Trees – background vocals
- Jim Gilstrap – background vocals

=== Technical personnel ===
- Eugene McDaniels – producer
- Larkin Arnold – executive producer
- John Mayer – production assistant
- Dave Grusin – arranger
- George Duke – arranger ("China")
- Hugh McCracken – arranger ("When We Were One")
- Roy Kohara – art director
- Mel Dixon – photographer
