= Have You Ever Seen the Rain (album) =

Studio album by Stanley Turrentine
- Released: 1975
- Recorded: July 1975
- Genre: Jazz
- Label: Fantasy
- Producer: Billy Page, Gene Page, Stanley Turrentine

Stanley Turrentine chronology
In the Pocket (1975)	Have You Ever Seen the Rain (1975)	Everybody Come On Out (1976)

Have You Ever Seen the Rain is an album by jazz saxophonist Stanley Turrentine, his third recorded for the Fantasy label, featuring performances by Turrentine with Freddie Hubbard and an orchestra arranged and conducted by Gene Page. The album was rereleased on CD in 1999 combined with Turrentine's 1980 album Use the Stairs as On a Misty Night.

== Reception ==
The Allmusic review by Christian Genzel awarded the album 1½ stars and states "the record's kitsch level is extremely high, and just when you think it can't get any cheesier, the album always goes that extra mile. But on a positive note, for some people at least, this might turn out to be one of the most beautiful and romantic albums of all time, if they're deeply in love and listening to this together with or without their object of desire. Perhaps this is exactly the kind of album you'd like to put on when you're with your girlfriend. Turrentine and Hubbard's playing is undeniably beautiful and romantic — and there's something about this album which makes it a bit hard to dislike, perhaps because it'd be all too easy to dismiss it. It's probably also due to the fact that Stanley is always very sincere about what he does; he just wants to play ballads. With cynicism put aside, it's not easy to decide whether this record is a hideous cash-in, cheesy beyond belief, or if it's an unfiltered taste of Stanley's most romantic side. Perhaps it's both".

Professional ratings
Review scores
Source	Rating
Allmusic	1.5/5 stars

== Track listing ==
1. "That's The Way Of The World" – 6:30
2. "Touching You" – 6:17
3. "T's Dream" – 7:13
4. "You" – 5:30
5. "Reasons" – 5:35
6. "Have You Ever Seen The Rain" – 4:00
7. "Tommy's Tune" – 3:30

- Recorded at Fantasy Studios, Berkeley, CA in July, 1975

== Personnel ==
- Stanley Turrentine – tenor saxophone
- Freddie Hubbard – trumpet, flugelhorn
- Gene Page – keyboards, arranger, conductor
- Vincent DeRosa – French horn
- Patrice Rushen – keyboards
- Clark Spangler – synthesizer
- Jay Graydon, David T. Walker – guitar
- Ron Carter (tracks 1–5 & 7), Scott Edwards (track 6) – bass
- Jack DeJohnette (tracks 1, 2 & 4–7), Harvey Mason (track 3) – drums
- Eddie "Bongo" Brown – congas
- Jim Gilstrap, John Lehman, Marti McCall, Jackie Waid, Carolyn Willis – vocals
- Unidentified strings – Harry Bluestone – concertmaster
