= In the Pocket =

In the Pocket may refer to:

- In the Pocket (Commodores album), 1981
- In the Pocket (James Taylor album), 1976
- In the Pocket (Neil Sedaka album), 1979
- In the Pocket (Stanley Turrentine album), 1975
- In the Pocket (Jessica Williams album), a 1994 album by Jessica Williams
- "In the pocket", a slang expression for R&B music with a strong groove
