= Pieces of Dreams (album) =

Studio album by Stanley Turrentine
- Released: 1974
- Recorded: May 30 & 31, 1974
- Genre: Jazz
- Length: 44:19
- Label: Fantasy
- Producer: Billy Page, Gene Page, Stanley Turrentine

Stanley Turrentine chronology
Don't Mess with Mister T. (1973)	Pieces of Dreams (1974)	In the Pocket (1975)

Pieces of Dreams is an album by jazz saxophonist Stanley Turrentine, his first recording for the Fantasy label after associations with Blue Note Records and CTI, featuring performances by Turrentine with an orchestra arranged and conducted by Gene Page. The CD rerelease added three additional tracks.

== Reception ==
In its year end issue, Billboard Magazine ranked Pieces of Dreams as the number 1 jazz album of 1975. The Allmusic review by Scott Yanow awarded the album 2 stars and states "Stanley Turrentine's recording of Michel Legrand's "Pieces of Dreams" is quite memorable and made the song into a standard. There are two versions of that song on this CD reissue, but unfortunately, the other six numbers and the two added alternate takes are all quite commercial... None of the other then-recent material is up to the level of "Pieces of Dreams," making this a disc that can be safely passed by".

Professional ratings
Review scores
Source	Rating
Allmusic	2/5 stars
The Rolling Stone Jazz Record Guide	4/5 stars
The Penguin Guide to Jazz Recordings	2/4 stars

== Track listing ==
1. "Pieces of Dreams" (Michel Legrand, Alan Bergman, Marilyn Bergman) – 4:37
2. "I Know It's You" (Leon Ware) – 6:25
3. "Deep in Love" (Johannes Brahms) – 4:04
4. "Midnight and You" (Billy Page, Gene Page) – 4:38
5. "Evil" (Stevie Wonder, Yvonne Wright) – 4:11
6. "Blanket on the Beach" (Page, Page) – 4:30
7. "I'm in Love" (Bobby Womack) – 4:01
8. "Pieces of Dreams" [alternate take] (Bergman, Bergman, Legrand) – 5:01 Bonus track on CD
9. "Blanket on the Beach" [alternate take] (Page, Page) – 3:34 Bonus track on CD
10. "I'm in Love" [alternate take] (Womack) – 3:35 Bonus track on CD

- Recorded at Fantasy Studios, Berkeley, CA on May 30 & 31, 1974

== Personnel ==
- Stanley Turrentine – tenor saxophone
- Gene Page – keyboards, arranger, conductor
- Sonny Burke, John Miller – keyboards
- Ray Parker Jr., Dean Parks, David T. Walker – guitar
- Ron Brown – bass
- Ed Moore, Ed Greene – drums
- Joe Clayton – congas
- Gary Coleman – percussion
- Myrna Matthews, Carolyn Willis, Edna Wright – vocals
- Unidentified strings
