= Come Get to This (album) =

1975 album by Nancy Wilson

Studio album by Nancy Wilson
- Released: June 1975
- Recorded: 1975
- Venue: Hollywood
- Studio: The Sound Factory
- Genre: Soul
- Length: 37:15
- Label: Capitol
- Producer: Gene Page, Billy Page

Nancy Wilson chronology
All in Love Is Fair (1974)	Come Get to This (1975)	This Mother's Daughter (1976)

Professional ratings
Review scores
Source	Rating
Allmusic	4/5 stars
The Virgin Encyclopedia of Jazz	3/5 stars

Come Get to This is a studio album by American singer Nancy Wilson, released by Capitol Records in June 1975. Gene Page did the arrangements and conducting, and co-produced the album with his brother Billy Page. One of several R&B-oriented albums that Wilson recorded during the 1970s, Come Get To This included musicians such as Ray Parker Jr. and members of The Crusaders, along with songs written by Marvin Gaye, Leon Ware & Pam Sawyer, and Gene & Billy Page.

Andy Kellman at AllMusic said, "Wilson offers lush and expressive R&B [that should] disarm skeptics from both sides of the pointless jazz/R&B divide," and that the album "should not have been out of print for so long."

Come Get to This reached No. 14 on Billboard's Soul chart and No. 119 on the Billboard 200.

In 2011, SoulMusic Records released a digitally remastered version of the album, paired with All in Love Is Fair, Wilson's previous album, which was also produced by Gene Page.

== Track listing ==
=== Side 1 ===
1. "Come Get to This" (Marvin Gaye) – 3:00
2. "All My Love Comes Down" (Billy Page, Gene Page) – 4:03
3. "Don't Let Me Be Lonely Tonight" (James Taylor) – 3:21
4. "If I Ever Lose This Heaven" (Leon Ware, Pam Sawyer) – 4:35
5. "Happy Tears" (Page, Page) – 4:06

=== Side 2 ===
1. "Houdini of the Midnite Hour (Page, Page) – 3:27
2. "This Time Last Summer" (Jimmy Webb) – 4:00
3. "He Called Me Baby" (Harlan Howard) – 3:51
4. "Like A Circle Never Stops" (Page, Page) – 3:30
5. "Boogeyin' All The Way" (Page, Page) – 3:22

== Personnel ==
From the original liner notes:

- Nancy Wilson – vocals
- Ray Parker Jr., Don Peake, Melvin Ragin, David T. Walker: guitar
- Joe Sample – keyboards
- Mike Melvoin – Yamaha
- Michel Rubini – ARP synthesizer
- Wilton Felder – bass
- Eddie Greene – drums
- Bobbye Hall – congas
- Gary Coleman – percussion
- George Bohanon – trombone solo
- Bud Brisbois – trumpet solo
- Gene Cirpiano – English horn solo
- William Green – oboe solo
- Dick Hyde – Baritone saxophone solo
- Ernie Watts – tenor saxophone and flute solos
- Marti McCall – background vocals
- Jackie Ward – background vocals
- Carolyn Willis – background vocals
- Jim Gilstrap – background vocals
- Augie Johnson – background vocals
- John Lehman – background vocals

=== Technical personnel ===
- Gene Page – producer, arrnager, conductor
- Billy Page – producer, background vocals arranger
- Larkin Arnold – executive producer
- Olivia Page – production coordinator
- David Hassinger – recording engineer
- Roy Kohara – art director
- David Alexander – photographer
