= In a Special Way (Gene Harris album) =

Studio album by Gene Harris
- Released: 1976
- Recorded: March 29 and April 1, 2 & 7, 1976
- Genre: Jazz
- Length: 40:28
- Label: Blue Note
- Producer: Jerry Peters

Gene Harris chronology
Nexus (1975)	In a Special Way (1976)	Tone Tantrum (1977)

In a Special Way is an album by American jazz pianist Gene Harris, recorded in 1976 and released on the Blue Note label.

== Reception ==
The Allmusic review by Stephen Thomas Erlewine awarded the album 4 stars, stating: "Harris crafted a record that revels in contemporary soul trends from the mid-'70s – lite funk in the vein of EWF, disco, Philly soul, and vapid fusion. The production is heavy-handed and glossy, filled with drippy strings, thumping beats, wordless backing vocals, and silly synthesized effects. Through it all, Harris plays exactly like he always does, as if he were oblivious to his surroundings".

Professional ratings
Review scores
Source	Rating
Allmusic	4/5 stars

== Track listing ==
1. "Theme for Relana" (Skip Scarborough) – 6:35
2. "Rebop" (Ronaldo N. Jackson, Jerry Peters, John Rowin) – 3:58
3. "Zulu" (Peters) – 4:59
4. "Always in My Mind" (Bradley "Mbaji" Ridgell, Peters, Sigidi Abdullah) – 4:31
5. "Love for Sale" (Cole Porter) – 4:48
6. "It's Your Love" (R. Melendrez, Charlotte Politte, John Rowin) – 3:02
7. "Soft Cycles" (N. Brown) – 2:30
8. "Five/Four" (Charlotte Politte) – 3:44
9. "Naima" (John Coltrane) – 6:21

- Recorded at Total Experience Studios in Los Angeles, California, on March 29 (tracks 1 & 3), April 1 (tracks 4 & 9), April 2 (tracks 5 & 6), and April 7 (tracks 2, 7 & 8), 1976.

== Personnel ==
- Gene Harris – keyboards
- George Bohanon – trombone
- Sidney Muldrow, Marnie Robinson – French horn
- Azar Lawrence – tenor saxophone
- Ed Green – violin
- Charlotte Politte – electric piano, synthesizer
- Jerry Peters – electric piano, synthesizer, string ensemble, arranger, vocals
- Lee Ritenour – guitar, electric guitar
- Al McKay – electric guitar
- John Rowin – electric guitar, arranger
- Chuck Rainey, Verdine White – electric bass
- James Gadson – drums
- Harvey Mason – drums, percussion
- Mayuto Correa – percussion
- Phillip Bailey – percussion, vocals
- Merry Clayton, Ann Esther Jessica, D.J. Rogers, Sigidi, Stephanie Spruill, Deniece Williams – vocals
