= Search and Nearness =

Studio album by the Rascals
- Released: March 1, 1971
- Recorded: October 1969 – October 1970
- Genre: Rock
- Length: 39:14
- Label: Atlantic
- Producer: The Rascals, Arif Mardin

The Rascals chronology
| See (1969) | Search and Nearness (1971) | Peaceful World (1971) |

Search and Nearness is the seventh studio album by rock band the Rascals, released on March 1, 1971. It was the last album featuring Eddie Brigati and Gene Cornish as well as the group's last album released on Atlantic Records.

== History ==
Although Eddie Brigati had left the Rascals in the autumn of 1970, the tracks were recorded from October 1969 to October 1970. Since the album was released several months after his departure, he is not listed as a regular group member, but is mentioned as lead vocalist on three tracks (none of them composed by Cavaliere) and most likely provided background vocals on most, if not all, of the remaining tracks. Brigati is also recognized in the acknowledgements for the group's 5-year tenure with Atlantic Records.

Search and Nearness was the group's lowest-charting album, spending one week on Billboard at #198. The two singles in conjunction with the LP, "Glory Glory" and "Right On", were released several months before the album. "Glory Glory" reached #58 and #42 on Billboard and Cashbox (respectively) in the summer of 1970. At the end of that same year, "Right On" (the group's last single on Atlantic) "bubbled under" Billboard at #119 in December 1970.

== Reception ==
Professional ratings
Review scores
| Source | Rating |
|---|---|
| Allmusic | 2.5/5 stars |
| Christgau's Record Guide | B+ |

Writing for Allmusic, critic Thom Jurek wrote the album "is perhaps a bittersweet memory for the band's members, and indeed certainly is for their die-hard fans. Its pluses included some of the best (if under-recognized) songs Felix Cavaliere had ever written... There are some really uneven moments here, but there are some stellar ones as well, and no serious fan of the Rascals should be without at least half the cuts here. In fact, in many ways, this is a stronger effort than See had been..." Music critic Robert Christgau wrote of the album, "... those who ignore the atrocious title and listen to the songs are in for a surprise, because this is no Freedom Suite. In fact, it may be their most consistent regular-release LP—only one waste cut per side."

== Inner cover photo ==
The photo shows Dino Danelli, Gene Cornish, and Felix Cavaliere sitting on a rooftop. There is an empty space with a pair of unoccupied shoes between Danelli and Cornish. Cornish's right arm is sticking out as if he has his arm around one's shoulder. In the background, Eddie Brigati is standing in one of the neighboring apartment windows. However, this was an insert photo condensed to fit in the window; Brigati himself is not in the photo, having left the group before the photo shoot (with Cornish's departure shortly thereafter).

== Track listing ==
All songs written by Felix Cavaliere except where indicated

=== Side One ===
1. “Right On” – 3:46 - Lead vocals: Felix
2. “I Believe” – 3:55 - Lead vocals: Felix
3. “Thank You Baby” – 3:09 - Lead vocals: Felix
4. “You Don’t Know” (Gene Cornish) – 4:10 - Lead vocals: Eddie
5. “Nama” (Dino Danelli) – 5:31 - Instrumental

=== Side Two ===
1. "Almost Home" – 3:49 - Lead vocals: Felix
2. "The Letter" (Wayne Carson Thompson) – 4:07 - Lead vocals: Eddie
3. "Ready For Love" – 4:07 - Lead vocals: Felix
4. "Fortunes" (Dino Danelli) – 3:10 - Lead vocals: Eddie
5. "Glory Glory" – 3:30 - Lead vocals: Felix

== Personnel ==
The Rascals

- Felix Cavaliere – vocals, keyboards
- Eddie Brigati – vocals
- Gene Cornish – guitar
- Dino Danelli – drums

Additional musicians

- Harold Cowart – bass guitar on “Almost Home”, “Ready For Love”, “Glory Glory” and “Thank You Baby”
- Ron Blanco – bass guitar on “You Don’t Know”
- Chuck Rainey – bass guitar on “Right On”, “I Believe”, “Nama”, “The Letter” and “Fortunes”
- Joe Newman – trumpet
- Joe Farrell – saxophone
- Seldon Powell – saxophone
- The Sweet Inspirations – background vocals on “Glory Glory”
- Cissy Houston & Tasha Thomas – background vocals on “I Believe”

Production

- Jack Adams, James Douglass, Ron Albert, Chuck Kirkpatrick, Don Casale – recording engineers

Artwork and photos

- Wolfgang Hutter – front album cover ("Ballspielendes Madchen") and back album cover ("Mittag")
- Marilyn Kroplick – inner album cover photo
- Maji Emerson – apartment window insert photo of Eddie Brigati
