= I Know I Love Him =

1973 album by Nancy Wilson

Studio album by Nancy Wilson
- Released: February 1973
- Recorded: 1973
- Genre: Vocal jazz, soul
- Length: 28:47
- Label: Capitol
- Producer: David D. Cavanaugh

Nancy Wilson chronology
Kaleidoscope (1971)	I Know I Love Him (1973)	All in Love Is Fair (1974)

Professional ratings
Review scores
Source	Rating
Allmusic	3.5/5 stars

I Know I Love Him is a studio album by American singer Nancy Wilson, released by Capitol Records in February 1973. One of several R&B/soul-oriented albums that Wilson recorded during the 1970s, it features The Crusaders as backing musicians, along with songs by Marvin Gaye and Gordon Parks. Don Sebesky did the arrangements and conducting, and David D. Cavanaugh served as producer.

== Critical reception ==
In a 1973 review, Billboard magazine called Wilson "the perfect person to bridge the gap between pop and soul.... Her gift on this LP is a mellowish mood, orchestrated beautifully by Don Sebesky to kiss her soulfully smooth voice within lush settings." Gramophone hailed the album as "a masterpiece in concept and musicianship," calling Wilson "truly superb in every aspect." They highlighted the Marvin Gaye-penned "We Can Make It Baby" and Gordon Parks' "Don't Misunderstand," a song that he had written the previous year for the soundtrack of Shaft's Big Score!.

More recently, Andy Kellman at AllMusic called the album "a deep gem – laid-back but resonant late-night listening."

== Chart performance ==
Despite positive critical reaction, I Know I Love Him was not a commercial success when it was released. It only reached No. 201 on the Billboard Top LPs & Tape, and the single from the album, "We Can Make It Baby," did not chart.

== Digital ==
In 2013, SoulMusic Records released a digitally remastered version of the album, paired with Wilson's 1971 album Kaleidoscope.

== Track listing ==
=== Side 1 ===
1. "We Can Make It Baby" (James Nyx, Marvin Gaye) – 2:57
2. "Morning in Your Eyes" (John Lehman, Ouida Lehman) – 3:59
3. "Don't Misunderstand" (Gordon Parks) – 3:07
4. "Are We Losin' Touch" (Mark James) – 2:51
5. "I Was Telling Him about You" (Don George, Morris Charlap) – 3:24

=== Side 2 ===
1. "Easy Evil" (Alan O'Day) – 2:48
2. "The Laughter and the Tears" (Randy Edelman) – 2:49
3. "Can I" (Hal Davis, Herman Griffith) – 3:10
4. "I Heard You Singing Your Song" (Barry Mann) – 2:29
5. "I Know I Love Him" (Bodie Chandler) – 1:13

== Personnel ==
From the original liner notes:

- Nancy Wilson – vocals
- Joe Sample – keyboards
- Wilton Felder – bass
- Stix Hooper – drums
- Arthur Adams – guitar
- David Cohen – guitar
- Don Sebesky – arranger, conductor
- David D. Cavanaugh – producer
