= Thank You...For F.U.M.L. (Funking Up My Life) =

Studio album by Donald Byrd
- Released: 1978
- Recorded: February–July 1978
- Studio: The Sound Factory, Hollywood, CA
- Genre: Rhythm and blues, funk, soul
- Length: 39:09
- Label: Elektra; 6E-144
- Producer: Donald Byrd

Donald Byrd chronology
Caricatures (1976)	Thank You...For F.U.M.L. (Funking Up My Life) (1978)	Donald Byrd and 125th Street, N.Y.C. (1979)

Thank You...For F.U.M.L. (Funking Up My Life) is an album by trumpeter Donald Byrd featuring compositions by the Blackbyrds, released on the Elektra label in 1978. The album marked a distinct movement away from jazz toward more rhythm and blues and disco influences. The cover art is by Romare Bearden.

== Track listing ==
All compositions by Art Posey, Josef Powell and Melvin Ragin except where noted

1. "Thank You for Funking Up My Life" (Posey, Powell, Kevin Toney) – 4:15
2. "Sunning in Your Loveshine" (Posey, Powell, Orville Saunders) – 5:40
3. "Your Love Is My Ecstasy" – 5:03
4. "Loving You" (Joe Hall) – 4:48
5. "Have You Heard the News?" – 4:42
6. "In Love with Love" – 4:48
7. "Cristo Redentor" (Duke Pearson) – 4:45
8. "Close Your Eyes and Look Within" (Posey, Powell, Saunders) – 5:15

== Personnel ==
- Donald Byrd – trumpet, vocals
- Greg Phillinganes – piano
- Paul Jackson Jr., Rick Littlefield, Wah Wah Watson – guitar
- Ed Watkins – electric bass
- Anthony Cox – drums
- Jim Gilstrap, John Lehman, Art Posey, Josef Powell, Syreeta Wright, Ralph Turnbough, Stephanie Spruill, John Lehman, Lisa Roberts, Patricia Henderson, Marlena Jeter, Maxine Anderson, Angela Winbush – vocals
