= Caricatures (Donald Byrd album) =

Studio album by Donald Byrd
- Released: August 1976
- Recorded: April–May 1976
- Genre: Jazz
- Labels: Blue Note; BN-LA633-G
- Producer: Larry and Fonce Mizell

Donald Byrd chronology
Places and Spaces (1975)	Caricatures (1976)	Thank You...For F.U.M.L. (Funking Up My Life) (1978)

Caricatures is an album by American trumpeter Donald Byrd recorded and released on the Blue Note label in 1976. It was Byrd's final album for the label and his fifth straight release produced by the Mizell Brothers.

== Reception ==
The AllMusic review by Rob Theakston awarded the album 3 stars and stated "Caricatures serves its primary purpose of being a jazz fusion record to make both people dance and purists wince at the notion that jazz can fuse with other elements and achieve success".

Professional ratings
Review scores
Source	Rating
AllMusic	3/5 stars

== Track listing ==
1. "Dance Band" (Rodney Mizell, Sigidi, Fonce Mizell) - 6:11
2. "Wild Life" (Fonce Mizell, Larry Mizell, Sigidi) - 5:58
3. "Caricatures" (Larry Mizell) - 5:08
4. "Science Funktion" (Larry Mizell, Fonce Mizell, Rodney Mizell) - 4:49
5. "Dancing in the Street" (Marvin Gaye, Ivy Jo Hunter, William "Mickey" Stevenson) - 4:41
6. "Return of the King" (Fonce Mizell, Larry Mizell) - 4:49
7. "Onward 'Til Morning" (Larry Mizell) - 3:44
8. "Tell Me" (Donald Byrd, Larry Mizell) - 4:20
- Recorded at The Sound Factory, Los Angeles, California in April–May 1976

== Personnel ==
- Donald Byrd - trumpet, flugelhorn, vocals
- Oscar Brashear - trumpet
- George Bohanon - trombone
- Gary Bartz, Ernie Watts - saxophones
- Jerry Peters, Patrice Rushen, Skip Scarborough - keyboards
- Fonce Mizell - keyboards, trumpet, backing vocals
- John Rowin, Bernard Beloyd Taylor, David T. Walker - guitar
- Scott Edwards (tracks 2–8), James Jamerson (track 1) - electric bass
- Alphonse Mouzon (tracks 2–8), Harvey Mason (track 1) - drums
- Mayuto Correa, Stephanie Spruill - percussion
- Mildred Lane (tracks 2 & 5), Kay Haith (tracks 3 & 7) - lead vocals
- Theresa Mitchell, Vernessa Mitchell, Larry Mizell - backing vocals
- Wade Marcus - string arrangement
- Unidentified strings
