= See (album) =

1969 album by The Rascals

Studio album by the Rascals
- Released: December 15, 1969
- Genre: Rock
- Length: 42:18
- Label: Atlantic
- Producer: The Rascals, Arif Mardin

The Rascals chronology
| Freedom Suite (1969) | See (1969) | Search and Nearness (1971) |

Singles from See
- 1. "See"/"Away, Away" Released: 1969; 2. "Carry Me Back"/"Real Thing" Released: 1969; 3. "I Believe"/"Hold On" Released: 1969

See is the sixth studio album by the rock band the Rascals, released on December 15, 1969. It peaked at number 45 on the Billboard 200. In Canada, it reached number 11. Three singles were released from the album, although the third one was "I Believe" (which was from Search and Nearness) backed with "Hold On".

== History ==
The album continued a trend towards album-oriented material authored and sung by Felix Cavaliere, begun with the band's Freedom Suite album earlier in the year. As the 1960s ended, the Rascals were slipping down the charts and Eddie Brigati was to leave the group during the recording of their next release, Search and Nearness, their final album for Atlantic Records.

== Reception ==
Professional ratings
Review scores
| Source | Rating |
|---|---|
| Allmusic | 2.5/5 stars |
| Rolling Stone | (neutral) |
| The Village Voice | A− |

Writing for Allmusic, critic Thom Jurek praised some of the individual tracks, but wrote of the album as a whole "... while See sounded more like an updated version of the Rascals of old, the consistency of attack wasn't there and there are several simply dodgy cuts, making the album—as an album—a disappointment." Village Voice critic Robert Christgau rated the album an A− and wrote "Admittedly, the Rascals have severe limitations, but so does rock itself, and this album apprehends and utilizes those limitations, with all of the annoying pretensions absent and the pleasant ones retained." Rolling Stone critic Lenny Kaye wrote in his review of See, "Sometimes one wonders if the Rascals wouldn't be better off just making hit singles. ... Given the space of an entire album, the group seems to flounder about, coming up with material that is in some cases good, but more often simply innocuous. Their latest, See, falls within this tradition."

== Cover art ==
The front sleeve shows an iconic image (La Grande Famille, 1947) by Belgian surrealist artist René Magritte. This artwork depicts a dove soaring against a backdrop where a brilliant blue, cloud-dotted sky contrasts with a darker, more foreboding atmosphere. Magritte skillfully portrayed the concept of family in "The Large Family" by evoking relevant and intense emotions through symbolic surrealism.

== Track listing ==
All songs are written by Felix Cavaliere, except where otherwise indicated.

=== Side One ===
1. "See" – 5:04
2. "I'd Like to Take You Home" – 2:37
3. "Remember Me" (Gene Cornish) – 2:12
4. "I'm Blue" (Felix Cavaliere, Eddie Brigati) – 3:51
5. "Stop and Think" – 4:10
6. "Temptation's 'Bout to Get Me" (James Leon Diggs) – 3:31

=== Side Two ===
1. "Nubia" – 3:44
2. "Carry Me Back" – 2:53
3. "Away Away" (Cornish) – 3:26
4. "Real Thing" – 2:45
5. "Death's Reply" – 4:19
6. "Hold On" – 3:37

== Singles ==
1. "See" / "Away Away" (May 1969) US: #27
2. "Carry Me Back" / "Real Thing" (August 1969) US: #26
3. "I Believe" / "Hold On" (December 1969) US: #51

== Personnel ==
=== The Rascals ===
- Felix Cavaliere – organ, piano, lead vocals, backing vocals
- Eddie Brigati – percussion, lead vocals, backing vocals
- Gene Cornish – guitar, lead vocals, backing vocals
- Dino Danelli – drums

=== Additional musicians ===
- Joe Bushkin – piano ("Carry Me Back")
- Chuck Rainey – bass guitar
- Ron Carter – bass guitar ("Nubia", "Carry Me Back")
- Danny Labbate – soprano saxophone
- Hubert Laws – flute

=== Production ===
- Adrian Barber – engineer
- Barry Goldberg – engineer
- Don Casale – engineer
