= Everybody Come On Out =

Studio album by Stanley Turrentine
- Released: 1976
- Recorded: March 1976 at Fantasy Studios in Berkeley, CA
- Genre: Jazz
- Length: 37:56
- Label: Fantasy F-9508
- Producer: Orrin Keepnews, Stanley Turrentine

Stanley Turrentine chronology
Have You Ever Seen the Rain (1975)	Everybody Come On Out (1976)	The Man with the Sad Face (1976)

Everybody Come On Out is an album by jazz saxophonist Stanley Turrentine recorded for the Fantasy label in 1976 and featuring performances by Turrentine with an orchestra arranged and conducted by Wade Marcus. The album consists of Turrentine's versions of many current pop hits.

== Reception ==
The Allmusic review by Rovi Staff simply stated "A very large group session recorded in March 1976 for Fantasy".

Professional ratings
Review scores
Source	Rating
Allmusic	3.5/5 stars
The Penguin Guide to Jazz Recordings	2/4 stars

== Track listing ==
1. "Everybody Come on Out" (Wade Marcus) - 4:18
2. "Stairway to Heaven" (Kenny Gamble, Leon Huff) - 3:56
3. "There Is a Place (Rita's Theme)" (Pamela Turrentine) - 6:14
4. "Many Rivers to Cross" (Jimmy Cliff) - 4:18
5. "Hope That We Can Be Together Soon" (Gamble, Huff) - 5:51
6. "All by Myself" (Eric Carmen) - 3:40
7. "Airport Love Theme" (Vincent Bell) - 5:36
8. "I'm Not in Love" (Eric Stewart, Graham Gouldman) - 4:03

== Personnel ==
- Stanley Turrentine - tenor saxophone
- Chuck Findley - trumpet, slide trumpet, flugelhorn
- Oscar Brashear, Bob Findley, Paul Hubinon - trumpet, flugelhorn
- George Bohanon, Charlie Loper - trombone
- Lew McCreary - bass trombone
- Bill Green - flute, English horn, baritone saxophone
- Buddy Collette - tenor saxophone, flute
- Dorothy Ashby - harp
- Joe Sample - electric piano
- Dawilli Gonga - synthesizer
- Craig McMullen, Lee Ritenour - guitar
- Paul Jackson - electric bass
- Harvey Mason - drums
- Bill Summers - congas, bongos, percussion
- Glenn Dicterow, Bobby DuBow, Winterton Garvey, Janice Gower, Michelle Grab, Carl LaMagna, Bob Lipsett, Mitchell Markowitz, Charles Veal, Kenneth Yerke - violin
- Denyse Buffum, David Campbell, Pamela Goldsmith, Arthur Royval - viola
- Ronald Cooper, Dennis Karmazyn, David Speltz - cello
- Richard Feves - contrabass
- Wade Marcus - arranger, conductor
