= Harlem Blues (Donald Byrd album) =

Studio album by Donald Byrd
- Released: 1988
- Recorded: September 22 & 24, 1987
- Studio: Van Gelder Studio, Englewood Cliffs, NJ
- Genre: Jazz
- Length: 52:24 CD release with bonus track
- Label: Landmark; LLP/LCD 1516
- Producer: Orrin Keepnews, Donald Byrd

Donald Byrd chronology
Words, Sounds, Colors and Shapes (1982)	Harlem Blues (1988)	Getting Down to Business (1990)

Harlem Blues is an album by trumpeter Donald Byrd featuring performances recorded in 1987 and released on the Landmark label the following year.

== Reception ==
Professional ratings
Review scores
Source	Rating
AllMusic	2.5/5 stars
The Penguin Guide to Jazz	2.5/4 stars

On AllMusic, Scott Yanow observed: "This Landmark release was trumpeter Donald Byrd's first jazz album in over 15 years after a long (and commercially if not artistically successful) detour into poppish R&B/funk. In the 1980s Byrd had neglected his trumpet playing in order to direct The Blackbyrds and teach. The period away from his instrument shows in spots on this well-intentioned set ... Ironically Byrd's own playing was not at this point up to the level of his sidemen although his chops would improve during the next couple of years". The Penguin Guide to Jazz praised Byrd's younger sidemen, while suggesting that the trumpeter's own playing had declined.

== Track listing ==
All compositions by Donald Byrd except where noted.

1. "Harlem Blues" (W. C. Handy) – 5:30
2. "Fly Little Bird Fly" – 6:13
3. "Voyage À Deux (Journey for Two)" (Kenny Garrett) – 7:44
4. "Blue Monk" (Thelonious Monk) – 9:22
5. "Alter Ego" (James Williams) – 7:36
6. "Sir Master Kool Guy" – 5:03
7. "Hi-Fly" (Randy Weston) – 10:56 Additional track on CD release

== Personnel ==
- Donald Byrd – trumpet, flugelhorn
- Kenny Garrett – alto saxophone
- Mulgrew Miller – piano
- Rufus Reid – bass
- Marvin "Smitty" Smith – drums
- Michael Daugherty – synthesizer (tracks 1 & 5)
