= Street Lady =

Studio album by Donald Byrd
- Released: March 1974
- Recorded: June 13–15, 1973
- Studio: The Sound Factory, Hollywood
- Genre: Jazz-funk
- Length: 42:12
- Label: Blue Note; BN-LA140-F
- Producer: Larry Mizell

Donald Byrd chronology
Black Byrd (1973)	Street Lady (1974)	Stepping into Tomorrow (1974)

Street Lady is an album by American trumpeter Donald Byrd released on the Blue Note label in 1974, with Larry Mizell returning as producer, following the success of its predecessor.

== Reception ==
The AllMusic review by Stephen Thomas Erlewine awarded the album three stars and stated "the appeal of Street Lady is how its polished neo-funk and pseudo-fusion sound uncannily like a jive movie or television soundtrack from the early '70s — you can picture the Street Lady, decked out in polyester, cruising the streets surrounded by pimps with wide-brimmed hats and platform shoes. And while that may not be ideal for jazz purists, it's perfect for kitsch and funk fanatics".

Professional ratings
Review scores
Source	Rating
AllMusic	3/5 stars
The Rolling Stone Jazz Record Guide	2/5 stars
Downbeat	2/5 stars

== Track listing ==
All compositions by Larry Mizell/Byrd except as indicated

1. "Lansana's Priestess" - 7:39
2. "Miss Kane" - 6:20
3. "Sister Love" - 6:11
4. "Street Lady" (Larry Mizell, Fonce Mizell) - 5:40
5. "Witch Hunt" - 9:42
6. "Woman of the World" (Edward Gordon, Larry Mizell) - 6:51

== Personnel ==
- Donald Byrd - trumpet
- Roger Glenn - flute
- Jerry Peters - piano, electric piano
- Fonce Mizell - clavinet, trumpet, vocals
- Fred Perren - synthesizer, vocals
- David T. Walker - guitar
- Chuck Rainey - electric bass
- Harvey Mason - drums
- King Errisson - congas and bongos
- Stephanie Spruill - percussion
- Larry Mizell - vocals, arranger, conductor
