= Nexus (Gene Harris album) =

Studio album by Gene Harris
- Released: 1975
- Recorded: May–June, 1975
- Genre: Jazz
- Length: 42:51
- Label: Blue Note
- Producer: Jerry Peters, Keg Johnson, Jim Shifflett

Gene Harris chronology
Astral Signal (1974)	Nexus (1975)	In a Special Way (1975)

Nexus is an album by American jazz pianist Gene Harris recorded in 1975 and released on the Blue Note label.

== Reception ==
The Allmusic review awarded the album 3½ stars.

Professional ratings
Review scores
Source	Rating
Allmusic	3.5/5 stars
The Penguin Guide to Jazz Recordings	1.5/4 stars

== Track listing ==
1. "Sauda" (Ronaldo N. Jackson, Charlotte Politte, John Rowin) – 2:05
2. "Funky Business" (Jackson, Politte, Rowin, Jerry Peters) – 4:05
3. "Koko and Leeroe" (Peters) – 6:05
4. "Love Don't Love Nobody" (Joseph Jefferson, Charles Simmons) – 7:28
5. "Rushin' Roulette" (C. Davis, Sigidi Abdullah, Brenda Sutton) – 3:52
6. "The Jitterbug Waltz" (Fats Waller) – 5:34
7. "Gettin' Down Country" (Peters) – 4:00
8. "H.R.D. (Boogie)" (Rowin) – 5:08
9. "Prayer '76" (Mbaji, Sigidi, Harold Clayton, Brenda Sutton, Jerry Peters) – 5:34

- Recorded at Music Recorders in Los Angeles, California in May–June, 1975.

== Personnel ==
- Gene Harris – keyboards
- Al Aarons – trumpet
- George Bohanon – trombone
- Mike Altschul, Fred Jackson, Jr. – reeds
- Julius Buffum, Wint Garvey, Rewit Koven, Charles Veal – strings
- Lee Ritenour – guitar
- John Rowin – guitar, electric bass
- Chuck Rainey – electric bass
- Kenneth Rice – drums
- Ronaldo N. Jackson, Gerald Steinholtz – percussion
- Harold Clayton, John Lehman, Lynn Mack, Jerry Peters, Sigidi – vocals, backing vocals
- Lani Graves, Keg Johnson, Julia Tillman Waters, Maxine Willard Waters – backing vocals
