= Yesterday, Today & Tomorrow (Gene Harris album) =

Studio album by Gene Harris
- Released: 1973
- Recorded: June 14–15, 1973
- Genre: Jazz
- Length: 80:28
- Label: Blue Note
- Producer: George Butler

Gene Harris chronology
Gene Harris of the Three Sounds (1972)	Yesterday, Today & Tomorrow (1973)	Astral Signal (1974)

Yesterday, Today & Tomorrow is an album by American pianist Gene Harris recorded in 1973 and released on the Blue Note label.

== Reception ==
The Allmusic review awarded the album 3 stars.

Professional ratings
Review scores
Source	Rating
Allmusic	3/5 stars

== Track listing ==
1. "On Green Dolphin Street" (Bronisław Kaper, Ned Washington) - 5:01
2. "Hymn To Freedom" (Oscar Peterson) - 5:37
3. "Trieste" (Antônio Carlos Jobim) - 8:32
4. "Love For Sale" (Cole Porter) - 9:05
5. "Something" (George Harrison) - 8:46
6. "How Insensitive" (Antônio Carlos Jobim, Vinícius de Moraes, Norman Gimbel) - 16:30
7. "Judy, Judy, Judy" (Gene Harris) - 4:56
8. "After Hours" (Avery Parrish) - 5:27
9. "Sawin' Wood" (Harris) - 6:08
10. "Lil' Darling" (Neil Hefti) - 6:21
11. "Monk's Tune" (Monk Higgins) - 6:05

- Recorded at Motown Studio in Detroit, Michigan on June 14 & 15, 1973.

== Personnel ==
- Gene Harris - piano, arranger
- Johnny Hatton - bass, electric bass
- Carl Burnett - drums, percussion

== Composition of "Trieste" ==
The song "Trieste" is actually a cover of Antônio Carlos Jobim's bossa nova song "Triste", composed in 1966. Aspects of bossa nova as well as the main melodic theme from Jobim's song are clearly heard in Harris's recording. The song title has caused many to falsely attribute composition to John Lewis.
