= Love Byrd =

Studio album by Donald Byrd and 125th Street, N.Y.C.
- Released: September 1981
- Recorded: Master Sound, Atlanta, Georgia
- Genre: Jazz, New York house, post-disco
- Length: 42:13
- Label: Elektra/Asylum Records
- Producer: Isaac Hayes

Donald Byrd and 125th Street, N.Y.C. chronology
Donald Byrd and 125th Street, N.Y.C. (1979)	Love Byrd (1981)	Words, Sounds, Colors and Shapes (1982)

Singles from Love Byrd
- 1. "Love Has Come Around" Released: 1981

Professional ratings
Review scores
Source	Rating
AllMusic	2/5 stars
The Rolling Stone Jazz Record Guide	3/5 stars

Love Byrd is a 1981 album by Donald Byrd and 125th Street, N.Y.C., produced by Isaac Hayes and released on the Elektra label.

== Track listing ==
=== Side one ===
1. "Love Has Come Around" (William Duckett) – 7:52
2. "Butterfly" (Andrew Stevens) – 6:05
3. "I Feel Like Loving You Today" (Isaac Hayes) – 6:57

=== Side two ===
1. "I Love Your Love" (Isaac Hayes, Aaron Mills, William Duckett, Andrew Stevens) – 6:59
2. "I'll Always Love You" (Donald Byrd) – 5:13
3. "Love for Sale" (Cole Porter) – 6:06
4. "Falling" (Isaac Hayes) – 3:01

== Personnel ==
Musicians

- Donald Byrd – trumpet
- Isaac Hayes – piano, Fender Rhodes, vibraphone, percussion, synthesizer, vocalist
- Ronnie Garrett – bass guitar
- William Duckett – electric guitar
- Albert Crawford Jr. – piano, Fender Rhodes, clavinet
- Eric Hines – drum kit
- Myra Walker – piano
- Rose Williams – vocalist
- Diane Williams – vocalist
- Pat Lewis – vocalist
- Diane Evans – vocalist

Production

- Joe Neil – engineer
- Bret Richardson – assistant engineer
