= Stepping into Tomorrow =

Stepping Into Tomorrow

Studio album by Donald Byrd
- Released: February 1975
- Recorded: November–December 1974
- Studio: Sound Factory (Hollywood)
- Genre: Jazz-funk
- Length: 38:13
- Label: Blue Note; BN-LA368-G
- Producer: Larry Mizell

Donald Byrd chronology
Street Lady (1973)	Stepping Into Tomorrow (1975)	Places and Spaces (1975)

Professional ratings
Review scores
Source	Rating
AllMusic	4/5 stars

Stepping Into Tomorrow is a 1974 album by jazz trumpeter Donald Byrd.

The AllMusic review by Andy Kellman awards the album with four out of five stars.

== Track listing ==
1. "Stepping Into Tomorrow" (Larry Mizell) – 5:06
2. "Design A Nation" (Mizell) – 4:19
3. "We’re Together" (Mizell) – 4:23
4. "Think Twice" (Sigidi, Mizell, Mbaji) – 6:10
5. "Makin’ It" (Harvey Mason) – 3:46
6. "Rock ‘N’ Roll Again" (Mizell) – 6:08
7. "You Are The World" (Mizell) – 4:29
8. "I Love The Girl" (Donald Byrd) – 3:52

== Personnel ==
- Donald Byrd - trumpet, flugelhorn, vocals
- Gary Bartz - alto sax, soprano sax, clarinet
- James Carter - whistler on "Rock And Roll Again"
- Mayuto Correa - congas
- Margie Evans, Freddie Perren - background vocals
- Kay Haith - primary vocals on "Think Twice"
- Fonce Mizell - trumpet, clarinet, background vocals
- Jerry Peters - organ, piano
- John Rowin, David T. Walker - guitar
- Larry Mizell - Fender Rhodes, ARP synthesizers, background vocals
- Chuck Rainey - bass
- Harvey Mason - drums, bata drums
- Roger Sainte - percussion
- Ronghea Southern - guitar on "Think Twice"
- Stephanie Spruill - percussion, background vocals

== Charts ==
=== Monthly charts ===
Monthly chart performance for Stepping into Tomorrow
Chart (2025)	Peak position
German Jazz Albums (Offizielle Top 100)	18
