= Tone Tantrum =

Studio album by Gene Harris
- Released: 1977
- Recorded: March–May 1977
- Genre: Jazz
- Length: 40:50
- Label: Blue Note
- Producer: Jerry Peters

Gene Harris chronology
In a Special Way (1976)	Tone Tantrum (1977)	Nature's Way (1980)

Tone Tantrum is an album by American jazz pianist Gene Harris, recorded in 1977 and released on the Blue Note label.

== Reception ==
Professional ratings
Review scores
Source	Rating
AllMusic	3.5/5 stars

The AllMusic review by Jason Ankeny stated, "Gene Harris never veered closer to mainstream jazz-funk than Tone Tantrum – a slick, propulsive record... Still, while the sound is radio-friendly, the quality and complexity of the performances serve as a potent reminder that Tone Tantrum is first and foremost a jazz record, and a solid (if unconventional) one at that, purists be damned.

== Track listing ==
1. "As" (Stevie Wonder) – 7:38
2. "If You Can't Find Love Let Love Find You" (Jerry Peters) – 6:14
3. "A Minor" (Peters) – 7:23
4. "Stranger in Paradise" (Alexander Borodin, Robert Wright, George Forrest) – 5:15
5. "Peace of Mind" (Al McKay) – 4:33
6. "Cristo Redentor Part 1" (Duke Pearson) – 4:55
7. "Cristo Redentor Part 2" (Pearson) – 4:52

- Recorded at Total Experience Studios in Los Angeles, California in March–May, 1977.

== Personnel ==
- Gene Harris – piano, electric piano, synthesizer
- Jerry Peters – electric piano, synthesizer, vocals, arranger
- Al McKay, John Rowin – electric guitar
- Anthony Jackson, Robert Popwell, Chuck Rainey, Verdine White – electric bass
- Leon "Ndugu" Chancler, Harvey Mason, Alvin Taylor – drums
- Jerry Steinholz – percussion
- Ralph Beecham – vocals
- Kenneth Yerke, Blanche Belnick, Harry Bluestone, Bonnie Douglas, Assa Drori, Ron Folsom, Winterton Garvey, William Henderson, Janice Gower, Mary Ann Kinggold, Rollice Dale, Denyse Buffum, Paul Pavlonick, Dennis Karmazyn, Selene Hurford, Richard Feves – strings
- Dorothy Ashby – harp
- Donald Byrd, Ray Jackson, George Thatcher, Maurice Spears, Donald Cook, Earl Dumler, David Crawford – horns
- Venetta Fields, D.J. Rogers, Maxine Waters, Julia Waters, Oren Waters, Deneice Williams, AnnEsther Davis, Gary Gairet – backing vocals
