= Love Has Come Around =

Single by Donald Byrd and 125th Street, N.Y.C.

from the album Love Byrd
- Released: 1981
- Genre: Post-disco; New York house
- Length: 7:52
- Songwriter(s): William Duckett
- Producer(s): Isaac Hayes

"Love Has Come Around" is a 1981 soul single by Donald Byrd and 125th Street Band, taken from the album Love Byrd, of the same year.

The single, produced by Isaac Hayes, was the most successful Donald Byrd single on the soul chart, peaking at number fifteen. Although, "Love Has Come Around" failed to crack the Hot 100, it peaked at number four on the dance charts. Outside the US, along with the track, "Loving You", "Love Has Come Around" peaked at number forty-one on the UK singles chart.

== Charts ==
Chart (1981)	Peak position
UK Singles (OCC)	41
US Billboard Disco Top 100	4
US Billboard Hot Soul Singles	15
