= Kaleidoscope (Nancy Wilson album) =

Studio album by Nancy Wilson
- Released: November 1971
- Recorded: 1971
- Genre: Vocal jazz, soul
- Length: 36:04
- Label: Capitol
- Producer: Dave Cavanaugh

Nancy Wilson chronology
| But Beautiful (1971) | Kaleidoscope (1971) | I Know I Love Him (1973) |

Professional ratings
Review scores
| Source | Rating |
|---|---|
| Allmusic | 3/5 stars |
| The Virgin Encyclopedia of Jazz | 3/5 stars |

Kaleidoscope is a 1971 album by Nancy Wilson. It was released in conjunction with her 1971 Caesars Palace engagement with Harry Belafonte.

== Chart performance ==
The album debuted on Billboard magazine's Top LP's chart in the issue dated December 25, 1971, peaking at No. 151 in 1972, during a six-week run on the chart.

== Track listing ==
1. "The Greatest Performance of My Life" (S. Anderle, R. E. Allen) – 3:19
2. "If I Were Your Woman" (C. McMurray, L. Ware, P. Sawyer) – 3:04
3. "I'll Get Along Somehow" (B. Fields, G. Marks) – 5:28
4. "Middle of the Road" (Reuben Brown) – 2:18
5. "Let It Be Me" (G. Becaud, M. Curtis, P. Delanoe) – 4:29
6. "To Be The One You Love" (N. Newell, S. Cipriani) – 2:15
7. "Mr. Bojangles" (Jerry Jeff Walker) – 6:06
8. "Ain't No Sunshine" (Bill Withers) – 2:19
9. "Everyone Knows" (Reuben Brown) – 2:20
10. "Once in My Lifetime" (J. Sharpe, L. Henrique) – 4:02

== Personnel ==
- Nancy Wilson – vocals, associate producer
- James Mack – conductor, tracks A1, A3, A4, A5, B1, B2, B4, B5
- Phil Wright – conductor, tracks A2, B3
- David Cavanuagh – producer
- Neil Brisker – photographer
