= Pieces of Dreams (song) =

Single by Peggy Lee

from the album Pieces of Dreams
- A-side: "One More Ride on the Merry-Go-Round"
- Released: September 1970
- Recorded: 1970
- Label: Capitol
- Songwriter(s): Michel Legrand (music); Alan and Marilyn Bergman (lyrics)
- Producer(s): Phil Wright

"Pieces of Dreams" is a song from the 1971 film of the same name. It was composed by Michel Legrand, the lyrics were written by Alan and Marilyn Bergman. It was performed by Peggy Lee as the title track on the film.

It was nominated for the Academy Award for Best Original Song at the 43rd Academy Awards; it lost to "For All We Know" from the film Lovers and Other Strangers. Billboard magazine wrote that it was the "most widely recorded" of that years nominees for Best Original Song. The lyrics concern a "little boy lost in search of little boy found".

Judith Crist writing in New York magazine in 1970, described the song as being featured on the soundtrack of the film over a "magnified-snowflake blurred-focus winter-wonderland scene of lovers cavorting in the snow" and that the song was one of a number of "schmaltz score[s]" by Legrand.

Johnny Mathis's recording of "Pieces of Dreams" reached the Billboard Top 40 Easy Listening chart in October 1970.

It was recorded by Shirley Bassey for her 1971 album Something Else. Sarah Vaughan recorded the song for her 1974 album Sarah Vaughan with Michel Legrand, with an arrangement by Legrand. Barbra Streisand recorded it for her 1974 album The Way We Were and her 2011 album of songs with lyrics by Alan and Marilyn Bergman, What Matters Most. Melissa Errico recorded the song for her 2019 album Legrand Affair.

Stanley Turrentine recorded several instrumental versions of the song; it was the title track of his 1971 album Pieces of Dreams.
