= A City Called Heaven =

Studio album by Donald Byrd
- Released: 1991
- Recorded: January 17–19, 1991
- Studio: Fantasy Studios, Berkeley, CA
- Genre: Jazz
- Length: 60:58
- Label: Landmark; LCD 1530
- Producer: Orrin Keepnews, Donald Byrd

Donald Byrd chronology
Getting Down to Business (1990)	A City Called Heaven (1991)

A City Called Heaven is an album by trumpeter Donald Byrd featuring performances recorded in 1991 and released on the Landmark label.

== Reception ==
Professional ratings
Review scores
Source	Rating
AllMusic	3/5 stars
The Penguin Guide to Jazz	2.5/4 stars

The AllMusic reviewer concluded: "Not a bad record, though not as unforgettable as his stuff from over two decades before." The Penguin Guide to Jazz wrote: "Hutcherson continues his Indian summer in the studios with swarming, harmonically dense lines and Henderson's profoundly cast solos evince all the great maturity which seems to have eluded Byrd".

== Track listing ==
All compositions by Donald Byrd except where noted.

1. "King Arthur" – 8:26
2. "I'll Always Remember" – 9:38
3. "A City Called Heaven" (Traditional) – 10:30
4. "Buck Down in Lu Easy Anna" (Donald Brown) – 6:49
5. "Byrd Song" (James Williams) – 6:01
6. "Del Valle" (Bobby Hutcherson) – 7:20
7. "Remember Me" (Henry Purcell) – 5:28
8. "Not Necessarily the Blues" – 7:10

== Personnel ==
- Donald Byrd – trumpet, flugelhorn
- Joe Henderson – tenor saxophone
- Bobby Hutcherson – vibraphone
- Donald Brown – piano
- Rufus Reid – bass
- Carl Allen – drums
- Lorice Stevens – vocals (tracks 3 & 7)
