= Words, Sounds, Colors and Shapes =

Studio album by Donald Byrd and 125th Street, N.Y.C.
- Released: 1982
- Recorded: 1982
- Studios: Mastersound Studios, Atlanta, GA
- Genres: Jazz, funk, soul music
- Length: 40:10
- Labels: Elektra; ELK 52427
- Producer: Isaac Hayes

Donald Byrd chronology
Love Byrd (1981)	Words, Sounds, Colors and Shapes (1982)	Harlem Blues (1987)

Words, Sounds, Colors and Shapes is an album by trumpeter Donald Byrd and 125th Street, N.Y.C. featuring Isaac Hayes released on the Elektra label in 1982.

Professional ratings
Review scores
Source	Rating
Allmusic	3.5/5 stars

== Track listing ==
1. "Sexy Dancer" (Donald Byrd, Isaac Hayes) – 5:11
2. "Midnight" (Byrd, Hayes) – 5:07
3. "So Much in Love" (Byrd, Hayes, Ronnie Garrett) – 4:00
4. "High Energy" (William Duckett, Byrd, Hayes, Garrett) – 5:47
5. "Star Trippin'" (Hayes) – 5:23
6. "I'm Coming Home" (Hayes, Sam Hamlin) – 4:14
7. "Forbidden Love" (Albert Crawford Jr., Hayes) – 5:24
8. "Everyday" (Garret, Duckett, Crawford, Myra Walker, Eric Hines, Byrd, Hayes) – 5:04

== Personnel ==
- Donald Byrd – trumpet
- Isaac Hayes – acoustic piano Fender Rhodes, vibes, percussion, synthesizer, concert bells
- Ronnie Garrett – electric bass
- William "Country" Duckett – electric guitar
- Albert "Chip" Crawford Jr. – acoustic piano, Fender Rhodes, clavinet, prophet
- Eric Hines – drums
- Glenn Davis – percussion
- Hot Buttered Soul Unlimited: Diane Evans, Diane Davis, Pat Lewis, Rose Williams – vocals
- Myra Walker – vocals (track 6)
- Isaac Hayes, Bill Purse – arrangers

== Tributes and references ==
In 2024, a retail space including a café and art galleries named Words Sounds Colors & Shapes is opened in Paris by designer Ramdane Touhami.
