= Donald Byrd and 125th Street, N.Y.C. =

Studio album by Donald Byrd and 125th Street, N.Y.C.
- Released: 1979
- Recorded: August–September 1979
- Studio: The Sound Factory, Hollywood, CA
- Genre: Jazz, funk, soul music
- Length: 36:57
- Label: Elektra; 6E-247
- Producer: Donald Byrd for Blackbyrd Productions Inc.

Donald Byrd chronology
Thank You...For F.U.M.L. (Funking Up My Life) (1978)	Donald Byrd and 125th Street, N.Y.C. (1979)	Love Byrd (1981)

Donald Byrd and 125th Street, N.Y.C. is an album by trumpeter Donald Byrd released on the Elektra label in 1979.

== Track listing ==
All compositions by Donald Byrd except where noted

1. "Pretty Baby" (Donald Byrd, Ronnie Garrett, William Duckett) – 5:05
2. "Gold the Moon, White the Sun" (Byrd, Kathy Wakefield) – 5:27
3. "Giving It Up" – 5:06
4. "Marilyn" – 3:58
5. "People Suppose to Be Free" (Byrd, Wakefield) – 4:48
6. "Veronica" – 4:23
7. "Morning" (Clare Fischer) – 4:05
8. "I Love You" – 4:04

== Personnel ==
- Donald Byrd – trumpet, flugelhorn, arranger
- Clare Fischer – Organ/Yamaha EX-42 ARP Pro Soloist, Fender Rhodes, Dyno My Piano, alto saxophone, acoustic piano
- Ronnie Garrett – electric bass
- William "Country" Duckett – electric guitar
- Pete Christlieb – saxophone
- Ernie Watts – flute
- Victor (Butch) Azevedo – drums, percussion
- Jim Gilstrap, John Lehman, Joyce Michael, Michael Campbell, Mitch Gordon, Zedric Turnbough – vocals
