= Music on My Mind =

1978 album by Nancy Wilson

Studio album by Nancy Wilson
- Released: June 19, 1978
- Venue: Los Angeles
- Genre: R&B, soul, vocal jazz
- Length: 31:30
- Label: Capitol
- Producer: Clarence McDonald

Nancy Wilson chronology
I've Never Been to Me (1977)	Music on My Mind (1978)	Life, Love and Harmony (1979)

Music on My Mind is a studio album by American singer Nancy Wilson, released by Capitol Records in June 1978. It was produced by Clarence McDonald, with arrangements by Charles Veal, and combined elements of R&B, soul and jazz.

== Background ==
Capitol released the album in conjunction with Wilson's 25th anniversary in show business, and it was recorded in front of 40 special guests who had been invited to celebrate the occasion. In addition, Wilson was scheduled to perform a special anniversary concert in Long Beach, California, on June 17, 1978, to coincide with the album's release, but she was involved in an automobile accident five days before, and the concert had to be canceled. Los Angeles Mayor Tom Bradley proclaimed June 11–17 "Nancy Wilson Week," and U.S. Representative Robert K. Dornan (R-CA) gave her a Congressional Commendation for her "unflagging dedication toward improving the quality of life, (and for being) a good will ambassador, without portfolio, to all the nations she visits on her performance tours."

== Reception ==
Professional ratings
Review scores
Source	Rating
AllMusic	4/5 stars

In a September 1978 review, Stereo Review labeled the album a "Recording of Special Merit." Critic Peter Reilly said, "Nancy Wilson's Music on My Mind is more proof that class will always tell. But just as class has always been a part of Wilson's performances throughout her long career, so has a powerful grasp of elemental sexuality. When these combine with her newly developed acting abilities, as they do here in the really fine title song, the result is champagne with a kick like hundred-proof vodka."

Billboard selected "I'm Gonna Let Ya" as one of its Recommended songs in their "Top Single Picks" for the week ending May 6, 1978.

Jason Ankeny at AllMusic said the album "stakes out turf somewhere between jazz and contemporary soul" and that "the high-energy, high-gloss grooves propel Wilson to deliver some of her boldest performances."

== Reissues ==
In 2013, SoulMusic Records released a digitally remastered version of Music on My Mind in a 2-CD set with her 1979 album, Life, Love & Harmony.

== Track listing ==
=== Side 1 ===
1. "I'm Gonna Let Ya" (Clarence McDonald, Fritz Baskett, Lani Groves) – 3:04
2. "Music on My Mind" (Deniece Williams, McDonald, Groves) – 3:03
3. "I'm a Balloon" (Baskett, Groves) – 4:28
4. "Let it Flow" (Nancy Wilson, Ralph Tee, Norman Williams, Norman Street) – 3:26
5. "Easy" (McDonald, Baskett, Groves) – 3:41

=== Side 2 ===
1. "He Makes Me Feel Good 'Bout Myself" (Baskett, McDonald) – 3:14
2. "I'm in Love" (Baskett, McDonald, David N. Shields) – 3:37
3. "I Really Need Him" (Baskett, McDonald, Groves) – 3:10
4. "Light" (Baskett, McDonald) – 3:18
5. "Music on My Mind (Reprise)" (Baskett, McDonald, Groves) – 0:54

== Personnel ==
- Nancy Wilson – vocals
- Clarence K. McDonald – keyboards
- Reginald Burke – keyboards
- Leo Nocentelli – guitar
- Mike Anthony – guitar
- Mitchell Holder – guitar
- David N. Shields – bass
- Earl Palmer – drums

=== Technical personnel ===
- Clarence McDonald – producer
- Charles Veal – arranger
- Grover Helsey – engineer
- Hugh Davies – engineer
- Wally Traugott – mastering engineer
- Jay Ranellucci – mixing engineer
- Larkin Arnold – executive producer

== Charts ==
The song "I'm Gonna Let Ya" reached No. 94 on Billboard's Best Selling Soul Singles, remaining on the charts for 5 weeks. It peaked at No. 81 on the Cash Box Top 100 R&B chart.
