= Getting Down to Business =

Studio album by Donald Byrd Sextet featuring Joe Henderson
- Released: 1990
- Recorded: October 10 & 12, 1989
- Studio: Van Gelder Studio, Englewood Cliffs, NJ
- Genre: Jazz
- Length: 55:24 CD release with one additional track
- Label: Landmark; LLP/LCD 1523
- Producer: Orrin Keepnews, Donald Byrd

Donald Byrd chronology
Harlem Blues (1987)	Getting Down to Business (1990)	A City Called Heaven (1991)

Getting Down to Business is an album by trumpeter Donald Byrd featuring performances recorded in 1989 and released on the Landmark label the following year.

== Reception ==
Professional ratings
Review scores
Source	Rating
AllMusic	3/5 stars
The Penguin Guide to Jazz	2.5/4 stars

On AllMusic, Scott Yanow observed, "Trumpeter Donald Byrd's second jazz album during his comeback after years of playing R&B/funk and then totally neglecting his horn finds him starting to regain his former form. The strong supporting cast sometimes overshadows the leader on this CD but the music overall (modern hard bop) is rewarding". The Penguin Guide to Jazz praised the contributions of Garrett and Henderson, while suggesting that the trumpeter's own playing had declined.

== Track listing ==
All compositions by Donald Byrd except where noted.

1. "Theme for Malcolm" (Donald Brown) – 7:39
2. "That's All There Is to Love" – 5:43
3. "Pomponio" (Bobby Hutcherson) – 10:18
4. "I Got It Bad (and That Ain't Good)" (Duke Ellington, Paul Francis Webster) – 8:29 Additional track on CD
5. "A Certain Attitude" (James Williams) – 5:13
6. "The Onliest" – 9:55
7. "Around the Corner" (Joe Henderson) – 8:07

== Personnel ==
- Donald Byrd – trumpet, flugelhorn
- Joe Henderson – tenor saxophone
- Kenny Garrett – alto saxophone (tracks 1, 3–5 & 7)
- Donald Brown – piano
- Peter Washington – bass
- Al Foster – drums
