= Places and Spaces =

Studio album by Donald Byrd
- Released: 1975
- Recorded: August 18, 20 & 25, 1975
- Studio: The Sound Factory, Los Angeles, California, U.S.
- Genre: Jazz-funk
- Length: 35:34
- Label: Blue Note; BN-LA549-G
- Producer: Larry Mizell

Donald Byrd chronology
| Stepping into Tomorrow (1974) | Places and Spaces (1975) | Caricatures (1976) |

Professional ratings
Review scores
| Source | Rating |
|---|---|
| Allmusic | 4/5 stars |
| The Rolling Stone Jazz Record Guide | 3/5 stars |

Places and Spaces is an album by American trumpeter Donald Byrd, that was released on Blue Note in 1975.

== Reception ==
Allmusic awarded the album with 4 stars and its review by Stephen Thomas Erlewine states: "Boasting sweeping string arrangements, sultry rhythm guitars, rubbery bass, murmuring flügelhorns, and punchy horn charts, the music falls halfway between the cinematic neo-funk of Street Lady and the proto-disco soul of Earth, Wind & Fire."

== In popular culture ==
The song "You And Music" appeared in the 2013 video game Grand Theft Auto V, on the in-game radio station WorldWide FM.

== Track listing ==
1. "Change (Makes You Want to Hustle)" (Larry Mizell) – 5:08
2. "Wind Parade" (L. Mizell) – 6:10
3. "(Fallin' Like) Dominoes" (Sigidi Bashir Abdullah, Bradley Ridgell, Harold Clayton) – 4:33
4. "Places and Spaces" (L. Mizell, Fonce Mizell) – 6:19
5. "You and Music" (L. Mizell, F. Mizell) – 5:22
6. "Night Whistler" (James Carter, L. Mizell, F. Mizell) – 3:43
7. "Just My Imagination (Running Away with Me)" (Barrett Strong, Norman Whitfield) – 4:36

== Personnel ==
- Donald Byrd – trumpet, flugelhorn, vocals
- George Bohanon – trombone
- Ray Brown – trumpet
- Tyree Glenn, Jr. – tenor saxophone
- James Carter – whistle
- Fonce Mizell – trumpet, clavichord, vocals, clavinet
- Larry Mizell – piano, vocals
- Craig McMullen – guitar
- John Rowin – guitar
- Skip Scarborough – piano
- Larry Dunn – synthesizer
- Chuck Rainey – bass
- Mayuto Correa – percussion, conga
- Harvey Mason – drums
- King Errisson – conga
- Kay Haith – vocals

== Charts ==
=== Weekly charts ===
| Chart (1975–1976) | Peak position |
|---|---|
| US Billboard 200 | 49 |
| US Top R&B/Hip-Hop Albums (Billboard) | 6 |

| Chart (2021) | Peak position |
|---|---|
| German Albums (Offizielle Top 100) | 98 |

=== Year-end charts ===
| Chart (1976) | Position |
|---|---|
| US Billboard 200 | 98 |

=== Singles ===
| Year | Song | Chart | Peak Position |
|---|---|---|---|
| 1975 | "Change (Makes You Want To Hustle) Part 1" | Billboard Disco Singles | 2 |
| 1975 | "Change (Makes You Want To Hustle) Part 1" | Billboard R&B Singles | 43 |
| 1976 | "(Fallin' Like) Dominoes | Billboard R&B Singles | 61 |
| 1976 | "Change (Makes You Want To Hustle)" | Billboard Dance Music/Club Play Singles | 8 |
