= In the Pocket (Stanley Turrentine album) =

Studio album by Stanley Turrentine
- Released: 1975
- Recorded: January 1975
- Genre: Jazz
- Label: Fantasy
- Producer: Billy Page, Gene Page, Stanley Turrentine

Stanley Turrentine chronology
Pieces of Dreams (1974)	In the Pocket (1975)	Have You Ever Seen the Rain (1975)

In the Pocket is an album by the jazz saxophonist Stanley Turrentine, his second recorded for the Fantasy label after associations with Blue Note Records and CTI. The album has performances by Turrentine with an orchestra arranged and conducted by Gene Page. It was released in 1975 and has yet to be rereleased on CD.

== Critical reception ==
Professional ratings
Review scores
Source	Rating
AllMusic	1/5 stars
Christgau's Record Guide	D+
The Encyclopedia of Popular Music	3/5 stars
The Rolling Stone Jazz Record Guide	3/5 stars

Reviewing in Christgau's Record Guide: Rock Albums of the Seventies (1981), Robert Christgau satirically wrote, "This is the sound track for a romantic comedy featuring Henry 'Hank' Aaron as a bank vice-president whose hobby is private investigation. While 'digging' into billiard-licensing payoffs, he falls for a lady eight-ball hustler (Leslie Uggams) who happens to be the daughter of Mr. Big, played by Barry White. Aaron decides to go crooked, but you know he'll never achieve the power or vulgarity of his father-in-law. Neither will Gene Page, who arranged this claptrap for Turrentine, a saxophonist whose fat, self-indulgent tone is apparently demanding the worst these days."

== Track listing ==
1. "Have It Your Way, Sandy" – 5:00
2. "You Are The Melody Of My Life" – 3:42
3. "Over To Where You Are" – 4:32
4. "Naked As The Day I Was Born" – 4:14
5. "In The Pocket" – 3:34
6. "Spaced" – 5:30
7. "You're My Baby" – 4:52
8. "Black Lassie" – 5:24
9. "Loving You Is Sweeter Than Ever" – 4:16

- Recorded in Los Angeles, CA, January, 1975.

== Personnel ==
- Stanley Turrentine – tenor saxophone
- Gene Page – keyboards, arranger, conductor
- Sylvester Rivers – keyboards
- Ray Parker Jr., Dean Parks, David T. Walker, Melvin Ragin – guitar
- Scott Edwards – double bass
- Ed Moore, Ed Greene – drums
- Bobbye Hall – congas
- Gary Coleman – percussion
- Jim Gilstrap, Augie Johnson, John Lehman, Gregory Matta, Jackie Ward, Carolyn Willis, Edna Wright – vocals
- Unidentified strings
