= Ghost Town Parade =

Studio album by Les Dudek
- Released: 1978
- Genres: Southern rock; blues rock; funk rock
- Length: 40:02
- Label: Columbia
- Producer: Bruce Botnick

Les Dudek chronology
| Say No More (1977) | Ghost Town Parade (1978) | Gypsy Ride (1981) |

Ghost Town Parade is the third studio album by Les Dudek. It was released in 1978 on Columbia Records.

== Track listing ==
Side 1

1. (1) "Central Park" - 5:11
2. (2) "Bound to Be a Change" - 3:14
3. (3) "Gonna Move" - 4:12
4. (4) "Friend of Mine" - 6:08

Side 2

1. (5) "Does Anybody Care" - 4:01
2. (6) "Down to Nothin" - 5:09
3. (7) "Tears Turn into Diamonds" - 2:56
4. (8) "Falling Out" - 3:39
5. (9) "Ghost Town Parade" - 4:58

== Charts ==
| Chart (1978) | Peak position |
|---|---|
| Australian (Kent Music Report) | 84 |

== Personnel ==
- Les Dudek : guitars; vocals
- Mike Finnigan : keyboards; backing vocals
- Jim Kreuger : guitar on 2, 4
- Max Gronenthal : keyboards on 1, 3, 5, 6, 7, 8, 9; backing vocals on 3, 7, 8, 9
- Robert Powell : bass on 1, 3, 5, 6, 7, 8, 9
- Gerald Johnson : bass on 2, 4
- Jim Keltner : drums on 2, 4
- Jeffrey Porcaro : drums on 2, 4
- Gary Mallaber : drums on 1, 3, 5, 6, 8, 9
- Carmine Appice : drums on 1, 3, 5, 6, 7, 8, 9
- Patrick Murphy : percussion on 1, 2, 4, 5, 6
- Jack Bruce : backing vocals on 1, 5, 6
- Produced by Bruce Botnick
- Recorded and Mixed by Andy Johns
- String and horn arrangements by Allan Macmillan, except 09 by Jerry Long
- Album cover art : Bodhi Wind
