= Les Dudek (album) =

Soundtrack album by Les Dudek
- Released: March 25, 1976
- Recorded: 1975
- Studios: Davlen Sound Studios (North Hollywood); Additional recording: Columbia Recording Studios (San Francisco)
- Genres: Southern rock, blues rock, jazz-rock, funk rock
- Length: 43:08
- Label: Columbia
- Producer: Boz Scaggs

Les Dudek chronology
| Les Dudek (1976) | Say No More (1977) |

Les Dudek is the eponymous debut album by American guitarist Les Dudek.

Steve Miller covered "What a Sacrifice" on his album Book of Dreams as "Sacrifice", which included Dudek and Curley Cooke in the recording.

== Track listing ==
All tracks are written by Les Dudek, with additional writers noted.

Side one
| No. | Title | Length |
|---|---|---|
| 1. | "City Magic" | 5:34 |
| 2. | "Sad Clown" | 5:29 |
| 3. | "Don't Stop Now" | 3:54 |
| 4. | "Each Morning" | 7:22 |

Side two
| No. | Title | Writer(s) | Length |
|---|---|---|---|
| 5. | "It Can Do" | | 6:31 |
| 6. | "Take the Time" | | 4:09 |
| 7. | "Cruisin' Groove" | | 4:08 |
| 8. | "What a Sacrifice" | James Curley Cooke | 5:53 |
| Total length: | | | 43:08 |

== Personnel ==
=== Musicians ===
- Les Dudek – guitars, lead vocals, backing vocals (5)
- Jeff Porcaro – drums (all tracks)
- David Paich – piano (1, 4, 7), organ (1–3, 5, 7), Moog (4), Rhodes piano (8)
- David Foster – Rhodes piano (8)
- Gerald Johnson – bass (1, 6, 7)
- Jim Hughart – bass (2)
- David Hungate – bass (3, 4)
- Chuck Rainey – bass (5, 8)
- Tom Scott – lyricon (3)
- Mailto Correa – congas (8)
- Glen Cronchite – percussion (8)
- Maxine Green, Pepper Swenson, Jeri Stevens – backing vocals (1, 6)
- Carolyn Willis, Myrna Matthews, Rebecca Louis – backing vocals (4, 8)
- Boz Scaggs – backing vocals (5)

=== Technical ===
- Produced by Boz Scaggs
- Engineered by Leonard Kovner (Davlen), Roy Segal and Glen Kolotkin (Columbia)
- Mixed by Tom Knox
- Mastered by Doug Sax at The Mastering Lab, Los Angeles, CA
- Design – Ron Coro and Tom Steele
- Photography – Ethan Russell
