= Les Dudek =

American musician (born 1952)

- Born: August 2, 1952 (age 74); Naval Air Station, Quonset Point, Rhode Island, United States
- Genres: Blues rock, Southern rock
- Occupations: Musician, singer-songwriter
- Instruments: Guitar, vocals
- Years active: 1972–present

Les Dudek (born August 2, 1952) is an American guitarist, singer and songwriter.

In addition to his solo material, Dudek has played guitar with Steve Miller Band, The Dudek-Finnigan-Krueger Band, Stevie Nicks, Cher, Boz Scaggs, The Allman Brothers Band, Maria Muldaur, Bobby Whitlock, Mike Finnigan, Jim Krueger and Dave Mason.

== Early years ==
Dudek was born at Naval Air Station, Quonset Point, Rhode Island, United States. His father, Harold, came from Campbell, Nebraska, and served in the United States Navy in World War II. His mother, Alma, of Brooklyn, was a former Radio City Music Hall Rockette. Dudek has one older sister, Sandy. The family is of Czech, German, Italian, and Russian descent. Six years after Dudek was born, his father retired from the Navy and the family moved to Auburndale, Florida, where he grew up.

== Musical career ==
In 1962, at the age of ten, Dudek asked his parents for a guitar for Christmas. They bought him an acoustic guitar from Sears & Roebuck. The Beatles caught Dudek's ear at an early age. Other musical influences were Cream, Jimi Hendrix, and The Ventures. He built quite a reputation around the Florida area as a proficient guitar player, having started playing in local bands "The United Sounds", "Blue Truth", and "Power", as a teenager. By 1973, that reputation would place him in the studio with the Allman Brothers Band for the recording of the Brothers & Sisters album. He played guitar harmonies with Dickey Betts on the well-known song "Ramblin' Man" and acoustic guitar on "Jessica". In Alan Paul's book, One Way Out: The Inside History of the Allman Brothers Band, Dudek claimed to have written the part in "Jessica" from when it modulated into G then eventually back to A.

His next stops were as a guitarist for Boz Scaggs and The Steve Miller Band. Dudek was invited to play with Journey, but decided to become a solo artist after receiving an offer to record for Columbia Records. He recorded four solo albums for Columbia Records, Les Dudek, Say No More, Ghost Town Parade and Gypsy Ride. He had two minor hits with "City Magic" and "Old Judge Jones" which were played frequently on local radio stations in the Los Angeles, California, area, where he lived at the time, having moved to West Hollywood in the mid-1970s.

He later collaborated with Cher, Stevie Nicks, and with two other Columbia artists, Mike Finnigan and Jim Krueger, with whom he formed The Dudek-Finnigan-Krueger Band in 1978. A DFKB album was released by Columbia Records a year later.

Between 1979 and 1982, Dudek and Cher had a personal as well as professional relationship. Dudek wrote and performed some of the music for the 1984 film Mask starring Cher, Sam Elliott, Eric Stoltz, and Laura Dern. He had a small part in the film as "Bone", a biker. Dudek also appeared in the television film Streets of Justice (1985). He has worked for NBC, ABC, ESPN, Fox Sports, and E! Entertainment Television. He can be heard on many television series including Friends.

In 1985, Dudek played guitar with Stevie Nicks on her album Rock a Little, and undertook her subsequent tour.

In 1989, he did a brief stint with Canadian rock group John Kay & Steppenwolf as their guitarist. Problems developed between Dudek and Kay, which led to him leaving the band after a month of touring.

Two more solo albums later, Deeper Shades of Blues (1994) and Freestyle! (2003), Dudek hit the road again with his own band, and has been performing songs from all his records, plus a few hits he has recorded with other artists.

In 2013, he released another solo album, Delta Breeze.

== Discography ==
Les Dudek

- Les Dudek (1976)
- Say No More (1977)
- Ghost Town Parade (1978)
- Gypsy Ride (1981)
- Deeper Shades of Blues (1994)
- Freestyle! (2003)
- Delta Breeze (2013)

The Dudek, Finnigan, Krueger Band

- The Dudek, Finnigan, Krueger Band (1980)

Steve Miller Band

- Fly Like an Eagle (1976)
- Book of Dreams (1977)
- Living in the 20th Century (1986)
- Wide River (1993)

Stevie Nicks

- Rock a Little (1985)

Cher

- Black Rose (1980)

Boz Scaggs

- Silk Degrees (1976)

Maria Muldaur

- Southern Winds (1978)

Richard T. Bear

- Red Hot & Blue (1978)

Mike Finnigan

- Black & White (1978)

The Allman Brothers Band

- Brothers & Sisters (1973)

Bobby Whitlock

- Rock Your Sox Off (1976)
