= David T. Walker =

American soul/R&B, and jazz guitarist (born 1941)

- Also known as: "David T."
- Born: David T. Walker; June 25, 1941 (age 84); Tulsa, Oklahoma, U.S.
- Genres: Soul, R&B, crossover jazz, jazz
- Occupations: Guitarist, composer, musician
- Instrument: Guitar
- Years active: 1957–present
- Website: davidtwalker.com

David T. Walker (born June 25, 1941) is an American soul/R&B, and jazz guitarist. In addition to numerous session musician duties since the early 1970s, Walker has issued fifteen albums in his own name.

== Career ==
David T. Walker was born to a Native American mother and African American father. He and his family relocated to Central California when he was 7 years old. He attended David Starr Jordan High School in the Watts area of Los Angeles. He has recorded fifteen solo albums since his debut release, The Sidewalk, in 1967. He has also been a session rhythm and lead guitarist, appearing on numerous soul, R&B, and jazz releases.

His backup work was featured on several singles and albums, including Love Unlimited Orchestra's big hit single Love's Theme.(1974), Stevie Wonder's Innervisions (1973); Marvin Gaye's Let's Get It On (1973) and I Want You (1976); Carole King's Fantasy (1973); the Jackson 5's Diana Ross Presents The Jackson 5, ABC, and Maybe Tomorrow, single "Never Can Say Goodbye" (1971); Michael Jackson's Ben, single "Got To Be There" (1971); Nick De Caro album "Italian Graffiti", song "Under the Jamican Moon" (1974), Afrique on its 1973 Afro funk release Soul Makossa, Joe Sample's In All My Wildest Dreams(1978), Smokey Robinson's pop hit Cruisin' (1979) Bobby Womack's album The Poet (1981), and LeVert's R&B hit (Pop Pop Pop) Goes My Mind (1986).

Other musicians Walker has worked with over the years include James Brown (1973), Ray Charles, LeVert, Aretha Franklin, Martha and the Vandellas, Bobby Womack(1981), Smokey Robinson, Leon Ware, Barry White & Love Unlimited Orchestra, Four Tops, Wah Wah Watson, Chuck Rainey, Etta James, Donald Byrd, Gladys Knight & the Pips, Billy Preston, the Sylvers, Quincy Jones, Hampton Hawes, Monk Higgins, Willie Hutch, Jeffrey Osborne, Johnny Bristol, Solomon Burke, Cannonball Adderley, B.B. King, the Friends of Distinction, the Crusaders, Joe Sample, Paul Humphrey, Bobbi Humphrey, Sérgio Mendes, Stanley Turrentine, Marlena Shaw, Blue Mitchell, Gloria Scott, and Boz Scaggs.

His song "On Love" was sampled on the breakbeat compilation album Tribe Vibes Vol. 2 by the group A Tribe Called Quest and on the collaborative album Alfredo by Freddie Gibbs and the Alchemist. His guitar riff on Joe Sample's "In All My Wildest Dreams" (from Rainbow Seeker) was sampled on Tupac Shakur's song "Dear Mama" (1995).

Walker played in Bill Cosby's all-star band at the 2008 Playboy Jazz Festival. He has gained popularity in Japan for playing guitar and he also leads his group on tours of Japan each year. He recently toured Japan with Marlena Shaw, Larry Carlton and a Brazilian artist Ed Motta.

== Discography ==
=== As Leader ===
- The Sidewalk (1967) Revue RS-7207
- Going Up! (1969) Revue RS-7211
- Plum Happy (1970) Zea ZLP-1000
- David T. Walker (1971) Ode Ode SP-77011
- Press On (1973) Ode SP-77020
- On Love (1976) Ode SP-77035
- Swing Street Cafe (with Joe Sample, 1981) Crusaders/MCA CRP-16004; Crusaders/MCA CRPD-5785
- Y-Ence (1987) The Baked Potato BPL-28005; Half Moon 28XE-3; Alfa Moon 32XM-35
- With A Smile (1988) The Baked Potato BPL-28006; Half Moon 28XE-4; Alfa Moon 32XM-69
- Ahimsa (1989) Half Moon 28XE-2
- Soul Food Cafe (with Soul Food Cafe, 1989) Invitation VDR-1636
- ...From My Heart (1993) Edoya EDCP-602; BMG BVCM-35165
- Dream Catcher (1994) Edoya EDCP-701; BMG BVCM-35166
- Beloved (1995) Edoya EDCP-25005; BMG BVCM-35167
- David T. Walker 1971-1976: Best of Best (2008) Video Arts Music VACZ-1365 (Japan)
- Thoughts (2008) DCT Records UPCH-20113 (Japan)
- Wear My Love (Christmas album, 2009) DCT Records UPCH-20176 (Japan)
- For All Time (2010) DCT Records XQJS-1002 (Japan)
- @ Billboard Live, Tokyo (with Larry Carlton, 2015) 335 Records 335-1507
- Music For Your Heart: Best of David T. Walker (2017) Universal Music UCCR-1064 (Japan)

=== As sideman ===
With Etta James

- Etta James Rocks the House (Argo, 1963)

With Martha & the Vandellas

- Martha and the Vandellas Live! (Gordy, 1967)

With Stevie Wonder

- Where I'm Coming From (Tamla, 1971)
- Innervisions (Tamla, 1973)

With the Jackson 5

- Diana Ross Presents The Jackson 5 (Motown, 1969)
- ABC (Motown, 1970)
- Third Album (Motown, 1970)
- The Jackson 5 Christmas Album (Motown, 1970)
- Maybe Tomorrow (Motown, 1971)
- Lookin' Through the Windows (Motown, 1972)
- Skywriter (Motown, 1973)
- G.I.T.: Get It Together (Motown, 1973)
- Dancing Machine (Motown, 1974)
- Joyful Jukebox Music (Motown, 1976)

With Afrique

- Soul Makossa (Mainstream, 1973)

With Marvin Gaye

- Trouble Man (Tamla, 1972)
- Let's Get It On (Tamla, 1973)
- Marvin Gaye Live! (Tamla, 1974)
- I Want You (Tamla, 1976)

With Cannonball Adderley

- The Happy People (Capitol, 1970)

With Donald Byrd

- Ethiopian Knights (Blue Note, 1971)
- Black Byrd (Blue Note, 1972)
- Street Lady (Blue Note, 1973)
- Stepping into Tomorrow (Blue Note, 1974)
- Caricatures (Blue Note, 1976)

With Nick De Caro

- Italian Graffiti (Blue Thumb, 1974)

With Friends of Distinction

- Reviviscence (RCA, 1975)

With Herbie Hancock

- Man-Child (Columbia, 1975)

With Monk Higgins

- Heavyweight (UA, 1972)

With Richard "Groove" Holmes

- Six Million Dollar Man, (RCA/Flying Dutchman, 1975)

With Freddie Hubbard

- Bundle of Joy (Columbia, 1977)
- Splash (Fantasy, 1981)

With Bobbi Humphrey

- Blacks and Blues (Blue Note, 1973)

With Paul Humphrey

- Paul Humphrey & the Cool Aid Chemists (Lizad, 1969)

With Quincy Jones

- Dollar$ (Reprise, 1971)
- Body Heat (A&M, 1974)
- Roots (A&M, 1977)

With Lonette McKee

- Lonette (Sussex, 1974)

With Blue Mitchell

- Stratosonic Nuances (RCA, 1975)
- The Last Tango = Blues (Mainstream, 1973)

With Alphonse Mouzon

- The Man Incognito (Blue Note, 1975)

With Jeffrey Osborne

- Jeffrey Osborne (A&M, 1982)

With Gloria Scott

- What Am I Gonna Do (Casablanca, 1974)

With Marlena Shaw

- Who Is This Bitch, Anyway? (Blue Note, 1974)

With the Sylvers

- The Sylvers II (Pride, 1973)

With Stanley Turrentine

- Pieces of Dreams (Fantasy, 1974)
- In the Pocket (Fantasy, 1975)
- Have You Ever Seen the Rain (Fantasy, 1975)
- Betcha (Elektra, 1979)
- La Place (Blue Note, 1989)

With Vulfpeck

- Christmas in L.A. (Single) (Vulf Records, 2014)
- Thrill of the Arts (Vulf Records, 2015)
- Game Winner (Vulf Records, 2016)
- Running Away (Vulf Records, 2017)
- Grandma (Vulf Records, 2017)

With Vulfmon

- Never Can Say Goodbye (Vulf Records, 2022)

With Leon Ware

- Musical Massage (Gordy, 1976)

With Bobby Womack

- The Poet (Beverly Glen, 1981)

With Dee Dee Bridgewater

- Just Family (Elektra, 1977)

With Ed Motta

- AOR (Dwitza, 2013)

== See also ==
- Barry White
