= Donald Byrd =

American jazz trumpeter (1932–2013)

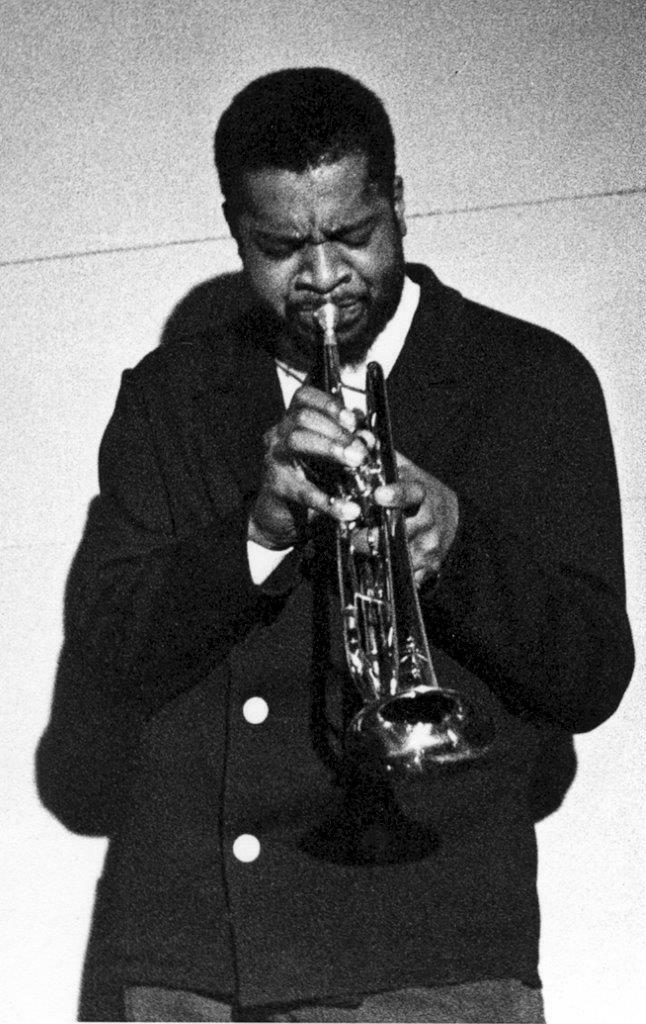
- Byrd in 1964

Background information
- Born: Donaldson Toussaint L'Ouverture Byrd II; December 9, 1932; Detroit, Michigan, U.S.
- Died: February 4, 2013 (aged 80) Dover, Delaware, U.S.
- Genres: Jazz; jazz fusion; crossover jazz
- Occupations: Musician, composer, vocalist
- Instruments: Trumpet; flugelhorn; vocals
- Years active: 1954–2013
- Labels: Blue Note; Prestige; Verve; Columbia; Transition
- Education: Wayne State University (B.A.); Manhattan School of Music

Donaldson Toussaint L'Ouverture Byrd II (December 9, 1932 – February 4, 2013) was an American jazz and rhythm & blues trumpeter, composer and vocalist. A sideman for many other jazz musicians of his generation, Byrd was one of the few hard bop musicians who successfully explored funk and soul while remaining a jazz artist. As a bandleader, Byrd was an influence on the early career of Herbie Hancock and many others.

== Biography ==
=== Early life and career ===
Byrd was born in 1932 in Detroit, Michigan. His family came from the African-American middle-class. His father, Elijah Thomas Byrd, was a Methodist minister who greatly valued education and oversaw his son's schooling. His mother, Cornelia Taylor, introduced Byrd to jazz music and it was her brother who gave Byrd his first trumpet. He attended Cass Technical High School. He performed with Lionel Hampton before finishing high school. During this period, his first professional recording session was in 1949 at Fortune Records in Detroit with the Robert Barnes Sextette for the single "Black Eyed Peas" / "Bobbin' At Barbee's." After playing in a military band during a term in the United States Air Force, Byrd obtained a bachelor's degree in music from Wayne State University and a master's degree from Manhattan School of Music. While still at the Manhattan School, he joined Art Blakey's Jazz Messengers as Clifford Brown's successor. In 1955, he recorded with Gigi Gryce, Jackie McLean and Mal Waldron. After leaving the Jazz Messengers in 1956, he performed with many leading jazz musicians of the day, including John Coltrane, Sonny Rollins, Thelonious Monk, and later Herbie Hancock.

Byrd's first regular group was a quintet that he co-led from 1958 to 1961 with baritone saxophonist Pepper Adams. The ensemble's hard-driving performances are captured live on At the Half Note Cafe. Byrd's 1961 LP Royal Flush was Hancock's Blue Note debut. Hancock has credited Byrd as a key influence in his early career, recounting that Byrd took the young pianist "under his wing" when he was a struggling musician newly arrived in New York, even letting him sleep on a hide-a-bed in his Bronx apartment for several years.

He was the first person to let me be a permanent member of an internationally known band. He has always nurtured and encouraged young musicians. He's a born educator, it seems to be in his blood, and he really tried to encourage the development of creativity.

Hancock also recalled that Byrd helped him in many other ways: he encouraged Hancock to make his debut album for Blue Note, connected him with Mongo Santamaria, who turned Hancock's tune "Watermelon Man" into a chart-topping hit, and that Byrd also later urged him to accept Miles Davis' offer to join his quintet.

Hancock also credits Byrd with giving him one of the most important pieces of advice of his career – not to give away his publishing rights. When Blue Note offered Hancock the chance to record his first solo LP, label executives tried to convince him to relinquish his publishing in exchange for being able to record the album, but he stuck to Byrd's advice and refused, so the meeting came to an impasse. At this point, he stood up to leave and when it became clear that he was about to walk out, the executives relented and allowed him to retain his publishing. Thanks to Santamaria's subsequent hit cover version of "Watermelon Man", Hancock was soon receiving substantial royalties, and he used his first royalty check of $6,000 to buy his first car, a 1963 Shelby Cobra (also recommended by Byrd) which Hancock still owns, and which is now the oldest production Cobra still in its original owner's hands.

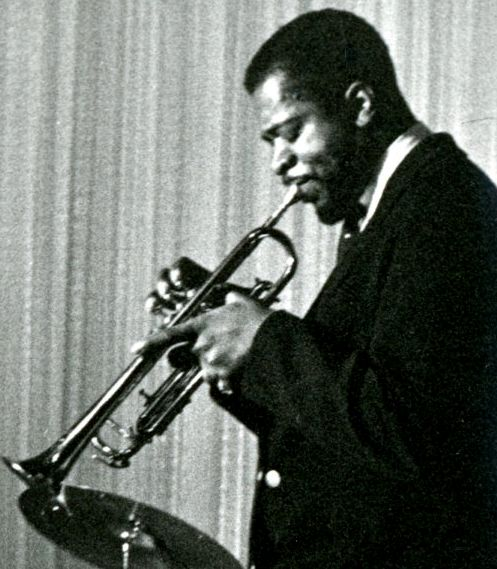
Byrd in 1964

In June 1964, Byrd played with Eric Dolphy in Paris only two weeks before Dolphy died from insulin shock.

=== Electric Byrd ===
By 1969's Fancy Free, Byrd was moving away from the hard bop jazz idiom and began to record jazz fusion and jazz-funk. He teamed up with the Mizell Brothers (producer-writers Larry and Fonce) for Black Byrd (1973) which was, for many years, Blue Note's best-selling album. The title track climbed to No. 19 on Billboard's R&B chart and reached the Hot 100 pop chart, peaking at No. 88. The Mizell brothers' follow-up albums for Byrd, Street Lady, Places and Spaces and Stepping into Tomorrow, were also big sellers, and have subsequently provided a rich source of samples for acid jazz artists such as Us3. Most of the material for the albums was written by Larry Mizell.

In 1973, he helped to establish and co-produce the Blackbyrds, a fusion group consisting of then-student musicians from Howard University, where Byrd taught in the music department and earned his J.D. in 1976. They scored several major hits including "Happy Music" (No. 3 R&B, No. 19 pop), "Walking in Rhythm" (No. 4 R&B, No. 6 pop) and "Rock Creek Park".

During his tenure at North Carolina Central University during the 1980s, he formed a group which included students from the college called the "125th St NYC Band". They recorded three albums; Love Byrd and Words, Sounds, Colors and Shapes which featured Isaac Hayes. "Love Has Come Around" on Love Byrd became a disco hit, reaching number No. 4 on Billboard's U.S. Dance Club Songs and in the UK and reached No. 41 on the charts.

Beginning in the 1960s, Byrd (who eventually gained his PhD in music education from Teachers College, Columbia University in 1982) taught at a variety of postsecondary institutions, including Rutgers University, the Hampton Institute, New York University, Howard University, Queens College, Oberlin College, Cornell University, North Carolina Central University and Delaware State University. Byrd returned to somewhat straight-ahead jazz later in his career, recording three albums for Orrin Keepnews' Landmark Records. Byrd was named a NEA Jazz Master in 2000.

Byrd was a resident of Teaneck, New Jersey. He died on February 4, 2013, in Dover, Delaware, at age 80.

== Discography ==
=== As leader/co-leader ===
Recording date	Title / Co-leader	Label	Year released	Notes
1955-08	Byrd Jazz	Transition	1956	Live
1955-09	Byrd's Word	Savoy	1956	
1955-12	Byrd's Eye View	Transition	1956	
1956-05	Byrd Blows on Beacon Hill	Transition	1957	
1956-08	2 Trumpets with Art Farmer	Prestige	1957	
1956-11	The Young Bloods with Phil Woods	Prestige	1957	
1957-01	3 Trumpets with Art Farmer and Idrees Sulieman	Prestige	1957	
1957-02, 1957-03	Jazz Lab with Gigi Gryce	Columbia	1957	
1957-08	At Newport with Gigi Gryce and Cecil Taylor	Verve	1958	Live
1957-07, 1957-08	New Formulas from the Jazz Lab with Gigi Gryce	Vik	1982	
1957-08	Jazz Lab with Gigi Gryce	Jubilee	1958	
1957-08, 1957-09	Modern Jazz Perspective with Gigi Gryce	Columbia	1957	
1957-09	Jazz Eyes	Regent	1957	
1957-?	September Afternoon with Clare Fischer	Discovery	1982	
1958-10	Byrd In Paris	Brunswick	1958	
1958-10	Parisian Thoroughfare	Brunswick	1958	
1958-12	Off to the Races	Blue Note	1959	
1959-05	Byrd in Hand	Blue Note	1959	
1959-10	Fuego	Blue Note	1960	
1960-01, 1960-07	Byrd in Flight	Blue Note	1960	
1960	Motor City Scene with Pepper Adams	Bethlehem	1961	
1960-11	At the Half Note Cafe	Blue Note	1960	Live
1961-04	Chant	Blue Note	1979	LT series
1961-05	The Cat Walk	Blue Note	1962	
1961-09	Royal Flush	Blue Note	1962	
1961-12	Free Form	Blue Note	1966	
1963-01	A New Perspective	Blue Note	1964	
1964-10, 1964-11, 1964-12	Up with Donald Byrd	Verve	1965	
1964-12	I'm Tryin' to Get Home	Blue Note	1965	
1966-06	Mustang	Blue Note	1967	
1967-01	Blackjack	Blue Note	1968	
1967-05	Slow Drag	Blue Note	1968	
1967-10	The Creeper	Blue Note	1981	LT series
1969-05, 1969-06	Fancy Free	Blue Note	1970	
1970-05	Electric Byrd	Blue Note	1970	
1969-12, 1970-12	Kofi	Blue Note	1995	
1971-08	Ethiopian Knights	Blue Note	1972	
1972-04	Black Byrd	Blue Note	1973	
1973-06	Street Lady	Blue Note	1974	
1973-07	Live: Cookin' with Blue Note at Montreux	Blue Note	2022	Live
1974-11, 1974-12	Stepping into Tomorrow	Blue Note	1975	
1975-08	Places and Spaces	Blue Note	1975	
1976-04, 1976-05	Caricatures	Blue Note	1976	
1978-02 – 1978-07	Thank You...For F.U.M.L. (Funking Up My Life)	Elektra	1978	
1979-08, 1979-09	Donald Byrd and 125th Street, N.Y.C.	Elektra	1979	
1981	Love Byrd	Elektra	1981	
1982	Words, Sounds, Colors and Shapes	Elektra	1982	
1987-09	Harlem Blues	Landmark	1988	
1989-10	Getting Down to Business	Landmark	1990	
1991-01	A City Called Heaven	Landmark	1991	

=== As sideman ===
With Art Blakey

- 1956: The Jazz Messengers (Columbia, 1956)
- 1956: Originally (Columbia, 1982)
- 1957: Art Blakey Big Band (Bethlehem, 1959)
- 1958: Holiday for Skins (Blue Note, 1959)

With Kenny Burrell

- 1956: All Night Long (Prestige, 1957)
- 1957: All Day Long (Prestige, 1957)
- 1957: 2 Guitars (Prestige, 1957)

With Paul Chambers

- 1956: Whims of Chambers (Blue Note, 1957)
- 1957: Paul Chambers Quintet (Blue Note, 1958)

With Sonny Clark

- 1957: Sonny's Crib (Blue Note, 1958)
- 1957-59: My Conception (Blue Note, 1979)

With Kenny Clarke

- Bohemia After Dark (Savoy, 1955)
- Klook's Clique (Savoy, 1956)

With John Coltrane

- 1957-58: Lush Life (Prestige, 1958)
- 1957-58: The Believer (Prestige, 1964)
- 1957-58: The Last Trane (Prestige, 1966)
- 1958: Black Pearls (Prestige, 1964)

With Eric Dolphy

- 1960-64: Naima (Jazzway, 1987)
- 1964: Unrealized Tapes (Last Recordings) (West Wind, 1988)

With Lou Donaldson

- 1957: Wailing With Lou (Blue Note, 1957)
- 1957: Lou Takes Off (Blue Note, 1958)

With Red Garland

- 1957: All Mornin' Long (Prestige, 1958)
- 1957: Soul Junction (Prestige, 1960)
- 1957: High Pressure (Prestige, 1961)

With Dexter Gordon

- 1964 One Flight Up (Blue Note, 1965)
- 1965: Ladybird (SteepleChase, 2005)

With Guru

- 1992-93: Jazzmatazz, Vol. 1 (Chrysalis, 1993)
- 1994-95: Guru's Jazzmatazz, Vol. 2: The New Reality (Chrysalis, 1995)

With Hank Jones

- 1955: Quartet-Quintet (Savoy, 1955)
- 1955: Bluebird (Savoy, 1956)

With Hank Mobley

- 1956: The Jazz Message of Hank Mobley (Prestige, 1956)
- 1956: Mobley's Message (Prestige, 1957)
- 1956: Jazz Message No. 2 (Savoy, 1957)
- 1956: Hank Mobley Sextet (Blue Note, 1957)
- 1957: Hank (Blue Note, 1957)
- 1963: No Room for Squares (Blue Note, 1964)
- 1963-65: The Turnaround! (Blue Note, 1965)
- 1963-66: Straight No Filter (Blue Note, 1986)
- 1967: Far Away Lands (Blue Note, 1984)

With Jackie McLean

- 1955: Presenting... Jackie McLean (Ad Lib, 1956)
- 1956: Lights Out! (Prestige, 1956)
- 1956: 4, 5 and 6 (Prestige, 1956)
- 1959: New Soil (Blue Note, 1959)
- 1959: Jackie's Bag (Blue Note, 1961)
- 1963: Vertigo (Blue Note, 1980)

With Duke Pearson

- 1962: Hush! (Jazztime, 1962)
- 1964: Wahoo! (Blue Note, 1965)

With Oscar Pettiford

- 1955: Another One (Bethlehem, 1955)
- 1957: Winner's Circle (Bethlehem, 1958)

With Sonny Rollins

- Sonny Rollins, Volume 1 (Blue Note, 1957) – rec. 1956
- Don't Stop the Carnival (Milestone, 1978) – live

With Horace Silver

- 1956: Silver's Blue (Epic, 1957)
- 1956: 6 Pieces of Silver (Blue Note, 1957)

With Jimmy Smith

- A Date with Jimmy Smith Volume One (Blue Note, 1957)
- A Date with Jimmy Smith Volume Two (Blue Note, 1957)

With George Wallington

- 1955: George Wallington Quintet at The Bohemia (Progressive, 1956) – live
- 1956: Jazz for the Carriage Trade (Prestige, 1956)
- 1957: The New York Scene (Prestige, 1957)
- 1957: Jazz at Hotchkiss (Savoy, 1957)

With others

- Pepper Adams, 10 to 4 at the 5 Spot (Riverside, 1958) – live
- Manny Albam, Bill Russo, Teo Macero, Teddy Charles, Something New, Something Blue (Columbia, 1959)
- Gene Ammons, Jammin' with Gene (Prestige, 1956)
- Cannonball Adderley, Discoveries (Savoy, 1987) – rec. 1955
- Robert Barnes Sextette, Black Eyed Peas / Bobbin' At Barbee's (Fortune, 1949)
- Chris Connor, Ballads of the Sad Cafe (Atlantic, 1959)
- Walter Davis Jr., Davis Cup (Blue Note, 1959)
- Kenny Drew, This Is New (Riverside, 1957)
- Art Farmer, Three Trumpets (Prestige, 1957) – also with Idrees Sulieman
- Bunky Green, My Babe (Vee-Jay, 1965) – rec. 1960
- Al Grey, Snap Your Fingers (Argo, 1962)
- Johnny Griffin, Johnny Griffin Sextet (Riverside, 1958)
- Gigi Gryce, Gigi Gryce and the Jazz Lab Quintet (Riverside, 1957)
- Herbie Hancock, My Point of View (Blue Note, 1963)
- Gene Harris, Tone Tantrum (Blue Note, 1977)
- Jimmy Heath, Swamp Seed (Riverside, 1963)
- Elmo Hope, Informal Jazz (Prestige, 1956)
- Solomon Ilori, African High Life (Blue Note, 1964)
- Ahmad Jamal, Big Byrd: The Essence Part 2 (Birdology, 1995)
- Michel Legrand, Legrand Jazz (Columbia, 1958)
- Mundell Lowe, TV Action Jazz! (RCA Camden, 1959)
- Thelonious Monk, The Thelonious Monk Orchestra at Town Hall (Riverside, 1959)
- Wes Montgomery, Goin' Out of My Head (Verve, 1965)
- Dizzy Reece, Blues in Trinity (Blue Note, 1958)
- Rita Reys and The Jazz Messengers, The Cool Voice of Rita Reys (Columbia, 1956)
- Sam Rivers, Dimensions & Extensions (Blue Note, 1967)
- Art Taylor, Taylor's Wailers (Prestige, 1957)
- Jim Timmens, Gilbert and Sullivan Revisited (Warner Bros., 1958)
- Cal Tjader, Soul Sauce (Verve, 1965) – rec. 1964
- Stanley Turrentine, A Bluish Bag (Blue Note, 2007) – rec. 1967
- Doug Watkins, Watkins at Large (Transition, 1956)
- Ernie Wilkins, Top Brass (Savoy, 1956) – rec. 1955
- Phil Woods, Pairing Off (Prestige, 1956)
