= Billy Page =

American songwriter

William E. Page II, better known as Billy Page, was an American musician, songwriter, and producer. He is best known for writing "The 'In' Crowd", which was a 1965 hit for both Dobie Gray and the Ramsey Lewis Trio. The song was also a 1974 hit for Bryan Ferry.

Other songs he wrote include "A House Built on Sand", a 1968 hit for Leslie Uggams; "Sugar Lump", a 1974 hit for Leon Haywood; and "Midnight and You" (co-written with his brother Gene Page), a 1974 hit for Solomon Burke.

Page also produced his brother Gene's musical score for the 1972 film Blacula.
