= The Best of Nancy Wilson =

1968 compilation album by Nancy Wilson

Compilation album by Nancy Wilson
- Released: 1968
- Recorded: 1960–68
- Genre: Vocal jazz
- Length: 30:12
- Label: Capitol
- Producer: David Cavanaugh

Nancy Wilson chronology
Easy (1968)	The Best of Nancy Wilson (1968)	The Sound of Nancy Wilson (1968)

Professional ratings
Review scores
Source	Rating
Allmusic	3/5 stars
The Virgin Encyclopedia of Jazz	4/5 stars

The Best of Nancy Wilson is the first compilation album by American singer Nancy Wilson. All of the selections were previously released as album tracks or singles between 1960 and 1968. The only track to appear for the first time on an album was the single version of "Face it Girl, it's Over," which is a longer edit than the version found on the LP Easy.

Ron Wynn at AllMusic calls the album "a reasonable sampler." He notes that while "it's impossible to fully convey the depth of her career from one album, this set at least didn't skimp on the jazz and blues numbers that earned her her reputation."

The album spent 14 weeks on the Billboard charts, reaching No. 23 on the Hot R&B LPs and No. 145 on the Billboard 200.

== Track listing ==
Side one
No.	Title	Writer(s)	Original release	Length
1.	"(You Don't Know) How Glad I Am"	Jimmy Williams, Larry Harrison	How Glad I Am (1964)	2:37
2.	"Uptight (Everything's Alright)"	Henry Cosby, Stevie Wonder, Sylvia Moy	A Touch of Today (1966)	1:57
3.	"Days of Wine and Roses"	Henry Mancini, Johnny Mercer	Hollywood – My Way (1963)	3:25
4.	"Don't Rain on My Parade""	Bob Merrill, Jule Styne	How Glad I Am (1964)	2:12
5.	"Guess Who I Saw Today""	Murray Grand, Elisse Boyd	Something Wonderful (1960)	3:23

Side two
No.	Title	Writer(s)	Original release	Length
1.	"Face it Girl, it's Over" (Single version)	Andy Badale, Frank Stanton	Capitol Records 2136 (1968)	3:09
2.	"Gentle Is My Love"	Bill Schluger, Don Raye	Gentle Is My Love (1965)	3:46
3.	"The Grass Is Greener"	Howlett Smith, Spence Maxwell	How Glad I Am (1964)	2:04
4.	"When Did You Leave Heaven"	Walter Bullock, Richard A. Whiting	Hollywood – My Way (1963)	2:54
5.	"You Can Have Him"	Irving Berlin	Broadway – My Way (1963)	4:35

== Personnel ==
- Nancy Wilson – vocals
- Oliver Nelson – arranger, conductor (1–2,4,8)
- Jimmy Jones – arranger, conductor (3,9–10)
- Billy May – arranger, conductor (5)
- H. B. Barnum – arranger, conductor (6)
- Sid Feller – arranger, conductor (7)
- David Cavanaugh – producer
