= New Faces (film) =

1954 film by Harry Horner

- Directed by: Harry Horner; John Beal (sketches); Eugene Anderson, Jr. (assi)
- Written by: Ronny Graham; Melvin Brooks; Paul Lynde (additional); Luther Davis (additional); John Cleveland (additional)
- Produced by: Edward L. Alperson; Berman Swarttz (co); Leonard Sillman (Associate)
- Starring: Ronny Graham; Eartha Kitt; Robert Clary; Alice Ghostley
- Cinematography: Lucien Ballard
- Edited by: Ace Herman
- Music by: Raoul Kraushaar
- Production company: Edward L. Alperson Productions
- Distributed by: 20th Century Fox
- Release date: February 19, 1954
- Running time: 96 minutes 98-99 minutes (US)
- Country: United States
- Language: English

New Faces is a 1954 American film adaptation of the musical revue New Faces of 1952 directed by Harry Horner with sketches directed by John Beal. Filmed in Cinemascope and Eastmancolor it was released by 20th Century Fox on March 6, 1954.

The film is sometimes referred to as New Faces of 1952, from the original Broadway show's title.

== Plot ==
The film was essentially a reproduction of the stage revue with a thin plot added. This involved a producer and performer in financial trouble on opening night. A wealthy Texan, whose daughter is in the show, offers to help out on the condition that he finds the show to be of high-enough quality and commercial potential to warrant the investment. Meanwhile, Clary locks a bill collector in a dressing room until the show is finished and he can collect the money. If the Texan performer's father is not impressed with her talent, she will be expected to return to Texas rather than pursuing her show-business career. Her attempts to impress onstage are hampered by the fact that her signature song is repeatedly cut short so that she can introduce the next act. But at the end of the show, the backer is duly impressed and his daughter not only has her talent validated, but announces that she will be marrying the other cast member with whom she's in love.

== Cast ==
Starring

- Ronny Graham as Himself
- Eartha Kitt as Herself
- Robert Clary as Himself
- Alice Ghostley as Herself

Under-billed cast

- June Carroll as Herself
- Virginia de Luce as Virginia de Luce Clayborn
- Paul Lynde as Himself
- Bill Mullikin as Himself
- Rosemary O'Reilly as Herself
- Allen Conroy as Herself
- Jimmy Russell as Himself
- George Smiley as Himself
- Polly Ward as Herself
- Carol Lawrence as Herself
- Johnny Laverty as Himself
- Elizabeth Logue as Herself
- Faith Burwell as Herself
- Clark Ranger as Himself
- Henry Kulky as Mr. Dee
- Charles Watts as Mr. Clayborn

== Background ==
Ronny Graham, Eartha Kitt, Robert Clary, Alice Ghostley, June Carroll, Virginia De Luce, Carol Lawrence, Patricia Hammerlee, Paul Lynde, and Bill Millikin reprised their stage roles.

The sketches include Lynde's famous "Trip of the Month" monologue, and a Death of a Salesman parody with Graham, Lynde and Ghostley, written by Mel Brooks, who is billed in the credits as "Melvin Brooks." In a March 2012 appearance at the American Cinematheque, Brooks said the sketch was originally written for another revue, "Curtain Going Up," but that show closed during its tryout in Philadelphia. However, Sillman had seen the show and asked him if he could import the sketch for "New Faces." Brooks readily agreed and thanked him for "saving my Broadway career." He added that Arthur Miller came to a performance and afterwards sent him a note which read, "I am not upset. But I should be."

== Soundtrack ==
The song order was changed and expanded and some songs were omitted, or had their lyrics updated. The song "Natty Puts her Hair Up" was omitted; however, an abridged version was used as an instrumental in a dance routine. The song "Don't Fall Asleep" was omitted. The song "Love is a Simple thing" omitted the final verse, that being the Charles Addams character verse, because it was too outdated. Also, an extra verse was added to "Lizzie Borden". Some of the lines in "Monotonous" were replaced and updated, omitting the line "Ike Likes Me", and being replaced with writing the "Dragnet" theme instead.

Song	Performer(s)	Composer(s)	Lyricist(s)
"Opening"	Company	Ronny Graham	Peter DeVries
"C'est si bon"	Eartha Kitt	Henri Betti	André Hornez
"He Takes Me off His Income Tax"	Virginia Wilson	Arthur Siegel	June Carroll
"Lucky Pierre"	Robert Clary, Carol Lawrence, Virginia Wilson, Patricia Hammerlee, and Bill Mullikin	Ronny Graham	
"Penny Candy"	June Carroll and Company	Arthur Siegel	June Carroll
"Boston Beguine"	Alice Ghostley	Sheldon Harnick	
"Love Is a Simple Thing"	Rosemary O'Reilly, Robert Clary, and Eartha Kitt	Arthur Siegel	June Carroll
"Time for Tea"	June Carroll and Alice Ghostley	Arthur Siegel	June Carroll
"Alouette"	Robert Clary, Carol Lawrence, Virginia Wilson, and Patricia Hammerlee	Traditional	
"Santa Baby"	Eartha Kitt	Philip Springer	Joan Javits, Tony Springer
"Waltzing in Venice" / "Take off the Mask"	Ronny Graham and Alice Ghostley	Ronny Graham	
"Raining Memories"	Robert Clary	Ronny Graham	
"Uska Dara"	Eartha Kitt	Traditional	
"I'm in Love with Miss Logan"	Robert Clary	Ronny Graham	
"Lizzie Borden"	Company	Michael Brown	
"Bal, petit bal"	Eartha Kitt and Robert Clary	Francis Lemarque	
"Monotonous"	Eartha Kitt	Arthur Siegel	June Carroll
Closing/Encore	Company	Unknown	Unknown
"Crazy, Man!"	Unclear	Ronny Graham	Paul Lynde
"Convention Bound"	Unclear	Ronny Graham	

=== Eartha Kitt (EP) ===
Full title Eartha Kitt Sings Songs from the Edward L. Alperson CinemaScope Production of Leonard Sillman's "New Faces", this was a 45 speed 7" extended play released around 1954 to market on the commercial success of the film's star, Eartha Kitt, after the film's release. The extended play was released by RCA Victor with the catalog number EPA-557. It was later issued in the United Kingdom in 1956, and in Germany perhaps around 1960.

==== Track listing ====
Track list and credits adapted from liner notes of original release. Track lengths are approximate and based on releases of the songs on different versions of That Bad Eartha.

Side A
No.	Title	Writer(s)	Orchestra conductor	Length
1.	"C'est si bon"	Henri Betti; André Hornez	Henri René	2:59
2.	"Monotonous" (from the musical revue "Leonard Sillman's New Faces Of 1952")	June Carroll; Arthur Siegel	Anton Coppola	3:48
Total length:				6:47

Side B
No.	Title	Writer(s)	Orchestra conductor	Length
1.	"Uska Dara" (A Turkish Tale)	Traditional	Henri René	3:11
2.	"Santa Baby"	Joan Javits; Philip Springer; Tony Springer	Henri René	2:52
Total length:				6:03

==== Release history ====
Region	Date	Format	Label	Catalog No.	Ref.
United States	1954	7" Vinyl	RCA Victor	EPA 557	
Australia	195?	7" Vinyl	RCA Australia, J. Albert & Son	20001	
United Kingdom	1956	7" Vinyl	RCA	EPA-557	
Germany	1960	7" Vinyl	RCA, Kapp	EPA-557	

== Reception ==
The New York Times review was mixed: "They have set up their CinemaScope cameras in front of a musical revue and photographed the various numbers precisely as though they were happening on a stage. As a matter of fact, the whole picture is just a reproduction of the Leonard Sillman Broadway stage review, with a few backstage shots to thread a slight plot about keeping the tottering show on the boards....A few of the dancing acts are stunning, spread out on the big panel screen and photographed in excellent color. There is pictorial energy here....And a couple of the skits and song numbers are made to look more formidable by size. This is true, especially, of the song numbers of Eartha Kitt, the weird little star, whose eeriness is rendered huge by CinemaScope. But the almost incredible surrender of the wide panel to a fellow named Paul Lynde for the painfully labored delivery of a five-minute monologue or to a tiny chap named Robert Clary for some grotesque attempts at comedy exposes the actual disadvantages of such plainly superfluous size. The strange thing is that Fox selected a strictly intimate revue for its first musical presentation on its anything but intimate screen.
