= The Nancy Wilson Show! =

Live album by Nancy Wilson
- Released: January 1965
- Recorded: 1965
- Genre: Vocal jazz
- Label: Capitol
- Producer: Michael Cuscuna

Nancy Wilson chronology
How Glad I Am (1964)	The Nancy Wilson Show! (1965)	Today My Way (1965)

Professional ratings
Review scores
Source	Rating
Allmusic	4/5 stars
The Virgin Encyclopedia of Jazz	4/5 stars

The Nancy Wilson Show! is a 1965 live album by Nancy Wilson, recorded at the Coconut Grove nightclub in Los Angeles.

== Track listing ==
1. "Fireworks" (Betty Comden, Adolph Green, Jule Styne) – 2:29
2. "Don't Take Your Love from Me" (Henry Nemo) – 3:29
3. "Don't Talk, Just Sing" (Sammy Cahn, Jimmy Van Heusen) – 4:41
4. "Guess Who I Saw Today" (Elisse Boyd, Murray Grand) – 4:21
5. "Ten Good Years" (Martin Charnin, Luther Henderson) – 4:21
6. "The Saga of Bill Bailey" (R. Harget, Henderson) – 6:21
7. "The Music That Makes Me Dance" (Bob Merrill, Styne) – 3:58
8. "I'm Beginning to See the Light" (Duke Ellington, Don George, Johnny Hodges) – 2:30
9. "You Can Have Him" (Irving Berlin) – 6:20

== Personnel ==
- Nancy Wilson – vocals
- Butch Stone – bass clarinet, baritone saxophone
- Bob Davis – clarinet, alto saxophone
- Fred Haller
- Abe Aaron – tenor saxophone
- Jim Hall – bass trombone
- Miles Anderson – trombone
- Bob Clark – trumpet
- Don Smith
- Jules Vogel
- Stumpy Brown – tuba, bass trombone
- Ronnell Bright – piano, musical director
- Buster Williams – double bass
- Kenny Dennis – drums
