= Robert Clary =

French actor (1926–2022)

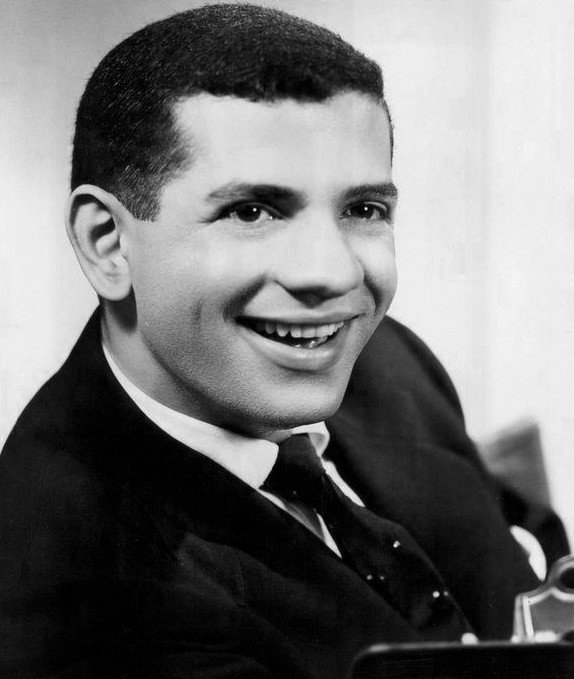
- Clary in 1953
- Born: Robert Max Widerman; March 1, 1926; Paris, France
- Died: November 16, 2022 (aged 96); Los Angeles, California, U.S.
- Occupations: Actor, singer
- Years active: 1950–2001
- Known for: Corporal LeBeau in Hogan's Heroes
- Spouse: Natalie Cantor Clary (m. 1965; died 1997)

Signature
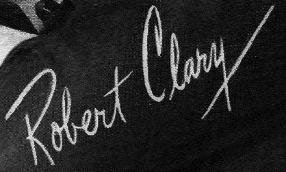

Robert Clary (born Robert Max Widerman; March 1, 1926 – November 16, 2022) was a French actor who was mainly active in the United States. He is best known for his role as Corporal Louis LeBeau on the television sitcom Hogan's Heroes (1965–1971). He also had recurring roles on the soap operas Days of Our Lives (1972–1987), and The Bold and the Beautiful (1990–1992).

== Early life and Holocaust survival ==
Born in 1926 in Paris, France, Clary was the youngest of 14 children, 7 of whom died in the Holocaust. His parents, Baila and Moishe Widerman, were Polish Jewish immigrants. At age 12, he began a singing career at cabarets, French radio and also studied art in Paris. At 16, he was singing at a cabaret in Normandy when the war started. With nowhere else to go, he returned with his family to Paris.

In 1942, he and his family were deported to the Nazi concentration camp at Ottmuth, in Upper Silesia (now Otmęt, Poland). At a train stop, he got out of the cattle car, found a tin can and began passing water to those still inside. For this, he was considered capable of work, and was tattooed with the identification "A5714" on his left forearm. Later he was sent to Buchenwald concentration camp.

At Buchenwald, Clary sang to an audience of SS soldiers every other Sunday, accompanied by an accordionist. He said, "Singing, entertaining, and being in kind of good health at my age, that's why I survived. I was very immature and young and not really fully realizing what situation I was involved with ... I don't know if I would have survived if I really knew that."

Writing about his experience, Clary said:

We were not even human beings. When we got to Buchenwald, the SS shoved us into a shower room to spend the night. I had heard the rumours about the dummy shower heads that were gas jets. I thought, 'This is it.' But no, it was just a place to sleep. The first eight days there, the Germans kept us without a crumb to eat. We were hanging on to life by pure guts, sleeping on top of each other, every morning waking up to find a new corpse next to you. ... The whole experience was a complete nightmare — the way they treated us, what we had to do to survive. We were less than animals. Sometimes I dream about those days. I wake up in a sweat terrified for fear I'm about to be sent away to a concentration camp, but I don't hold a grudge because that's a great waste of time. Yes, there's something dark in the human soul. For the most part, human beings are not very nice. That's why when you find those who are, you cherish them.

Clary was liberated from Buchenwald on April 11, 1945. Twelve other members of his immediate family had been sent to Auschwitz concentration camp; Clary was the only survivor. When he returned to Paris after World War II, he reunited with six of his thirteen siblings and half-siblings and several nieces and nephews who had avoided being taken away and survived the Nazi occupation of France.

== Career ==
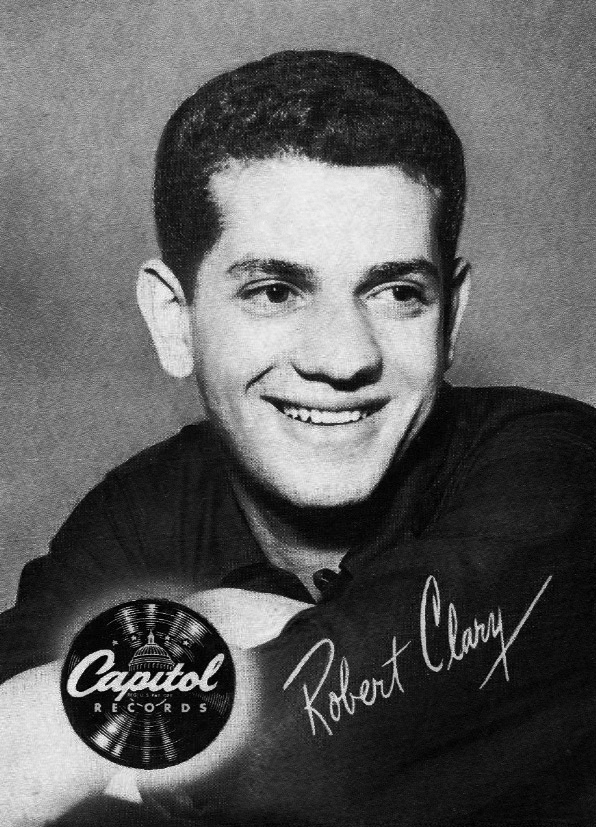
Clary c. 1950, as a Capitol recording artist

Clary returned to the entertainment business and began singing songs that became popular not only in France, but in the United States as well. Clary made his first recordings in 1948; they were brought to the United States on magnetic wire recording technology and were then issued on vinyl disk by Capitol Records. He went to the U.S. in October 1949. One of Clary's first American appearances was a French-language comedy skit on The Ed Wynn Show in 1950. Clary later met Merv Griffin and Eddie Cantor. This eventually led to Clary meeting Cantor's daughter, Natalie Cantor Metzger, whom he married in 1965, after being "the closest of friends" for 15 years. Cantor later got Clary a spot on The Colgate Comedy Hour. In the mid-1950s, Clary appeared on NBC's early sitcom The Martha Raye Show and on CBS's drama anthology series Appointment with Adventure.

Clary's comedic skills were quickly recognized by Broadway, where he appeared in several popular musicals, including Leonard Sillman's revue New Faces of 1952, which was produced as a film in 1954.

In 1952, he appeared in the film Thief of Damascus which also starred Paul Henreid and Lon Chaney Jr. In 1958, he guest-starred on The Gisele MacKenzie Show (NBC).

In 1959, he was cast in the title role of Henri de Toulouse-Lautrec in a British production of an Edward Chodorov play, Monsieur Lautrec. The play ran for two weeks at the Belgrade Theatre in Coventry. Although The Stage panned the play, it praised Clary for portraying Lautrec "with a delicacy and yet moving intenseness."

== LeBeau on Hogan's Heroes ==
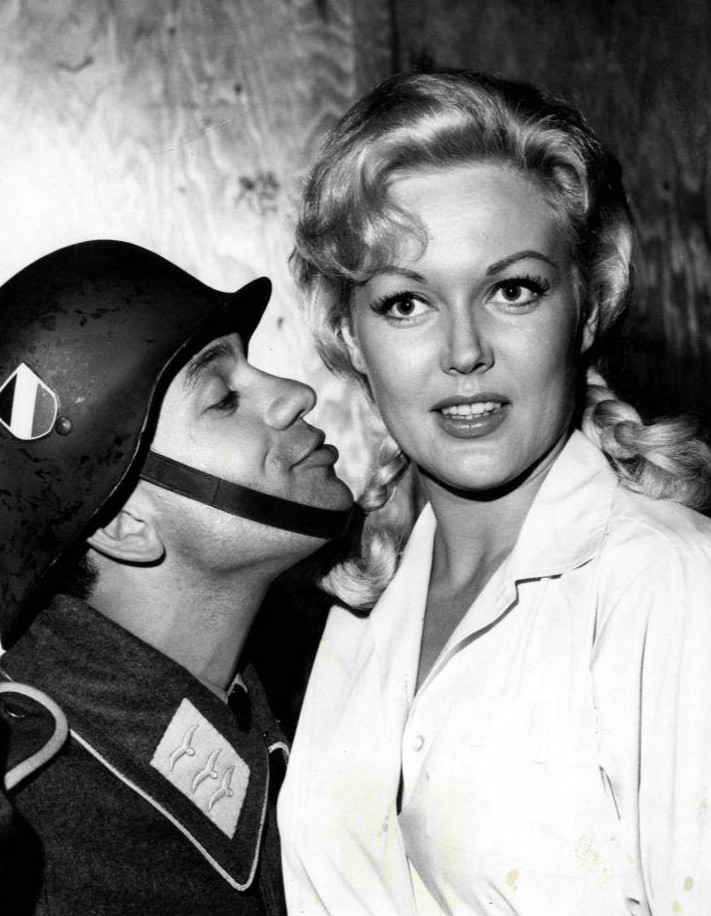
As LeBeau in Hogan's Heroes with Fräulein Helga (Cynthia Lynn)

In 1965, the diminutive 155 cm (5 ft 1 in) Clary was offered the role of Corporal Louis LeBeau on a new television sitcom called Hogan's Heroes, and he accepted the role when the pilot sold. The series was set in a German prisoner of war (POW) camp during World War II, and Clary played a French POW who was a member of an Allied sabotage unit operating from inside the camp.

Asked about parallels between LeBeau's incarceration and his own, Clary said, "Stalag 13 is not a concentration camp. It's a POW camp, and that's a world of difference. You never heard of a prisoner of war being gassed or hanged. When the show went on the air, people asked me if I had any qualms about doing a comedy series dealing with Nazis and concentration camps. I had to explain that it was about prisoners of war in a Stalag, not a concentration camp, and although I did not want to diminish what soldiers went through during their internments, it was like night and day from what people endured in concentration camps."

Clary was the last surviving original cast member of Hogan's Heroes. Kenneth Washington, who joined the cast in the show's final season as Sergeant Richard Baker, was the only surviving cast member when Clary died.

== Later life and career ==
After Hogan's Heroes was cancelled in 1971, Clary maintained close ties to fellow Hogan's Heroes cast members Werner Klemperer, John Banner, and Leon Askin, whose lives were also affected by the Holocaust. Following the show's cancellation, he appeared in a handful of feature films with World War II themes, including the made-for-television film Remembrance of Love, about the Holocaust. Clary also appeared on the soap operas Days of Our Lives, The Young and the Restless, and The Bold and the Beautiful. He guest-starred on The Munsters Today (1989) as Louis Schecter, Lily's acting coach, in the episode "Green Eyed Munsters".

Clary appeared in the 1975 film The Hindenburg, which portrayed a fictional plot to blow up the German airship after it arrived at the Lakehurst Naval Air Station. He played Joseph Späh, a real-life passenger on the airship's final voyage.

Clary spent years touring Canada and the United States, speaking about the Holocaust. He was a painter, painting from photographs he took on his travels.

Clary was among dozens of Holocaust survivors whose portraits and stories were included in the 1997 book “The Triumphant Spirit,” by photographer Nick Del Calzo. In the book, Clary said, “I beg the next generation not to do what people have done for centuries — hate others because of their skin, shape of their eyes, or religious preference,”

Clary published a memoir, From the Holocaust to Hogan's Heroes: The Autobiography of Robert Clary, in 2001.

== Personal life and death ==
Clary married Natalie Cantor, the daughter of Eddie Cantor, in 1965. She died in 1997. The couple had no children.

Clary died at his Los Angeles home on November 16, 2022, at age 96. Clary's niece, Brenda Hancock, confirmed his death to the public, but did not provide a cause.

== Films ==
- Ten Tall Men (1951) — Mossul
- Thief of Damascus (1952) — Aladdin
- New Faces (1954) — various songs and characters in this musical comedy revue, reprising his role from Broadway's New Faces of 1952
- A New Kind of Love (1963) — Frenchman at restaurant
- The Hindenburg (1975) — Joseph Späh
- Remembrance of Love (1982) — played himself as an Auschwitz survivor

== Television ==
- Hogan's Heroes (1965–1971) — Corporal Louis LeBeau
- The High Chaparral (1967–1971) — Lucien Chariot
- Days of Our Lives (1972–1973, 1975–1983, 1986–1987) — Robert LeClair
- The Young and the Restless (1973–1974) — Pierre Roulland
- Fantasy Island (1978) — Ipsy Dauphin in "Escape/Cinderella girls"
- The Bold and the Beautiful (1990–1992) — Pierre Jourdan
