= Bistro Ballads Sung by Audrey Morris =

Bistro Ballads Sung By Audrey Morris

Studio album by Audrey Morris
- Released: 1956
- Studio: RCA Studios. Chicago
- Genre: Jazz, pop
- Length: 67:00
- Label: X Records

Bistro Ballads Sung By Audrey Morris is a 1956 studio album by jazz singer Audrey Morris, coordinated by Jimmy Hilliard. It was recorded at RCA Studios in Chicago, Illinois and released on the X Records label. The album was later paired with another album by Audrey Morris The Voice of Audrey Morris.

== Track listing ==
1. "Nobody's Heart Belongs to Me" (Richard Rodgers, Lorenz Hart) - 2:52
2. "Where Are You" (Harold Adamson, Jimmy McHugh) - 3:45
3. "Good Morning Heartache" (Dan Fisher, Ervin Drake, Irene Higgenbotham) - 3:45
4. "Come In Out of The Rain" (Bob Russell, Carl Sigman) - 3:13
5. "Sweet William" (Herman Gillis, Wayne) - 2:59
6. "Blah, Blah, Blah" (George & Ira Gershwin) - 3:17
7. "Guess Who I Saw Today" (Elisse Boyd, Murray Grand) - 2:24
8. "Guess I'll Hang My Tears Out to Dry" (Jule Styne, Sammy Cahn) - 3:23
9. "April Fool" (Dick Charles, Eddie Waldman) - 3:08
10. "The End of a Love Affair" (E. C. Redding) - 2:44
