= Alice Ghostley =

American actress and singer (1923–2007)

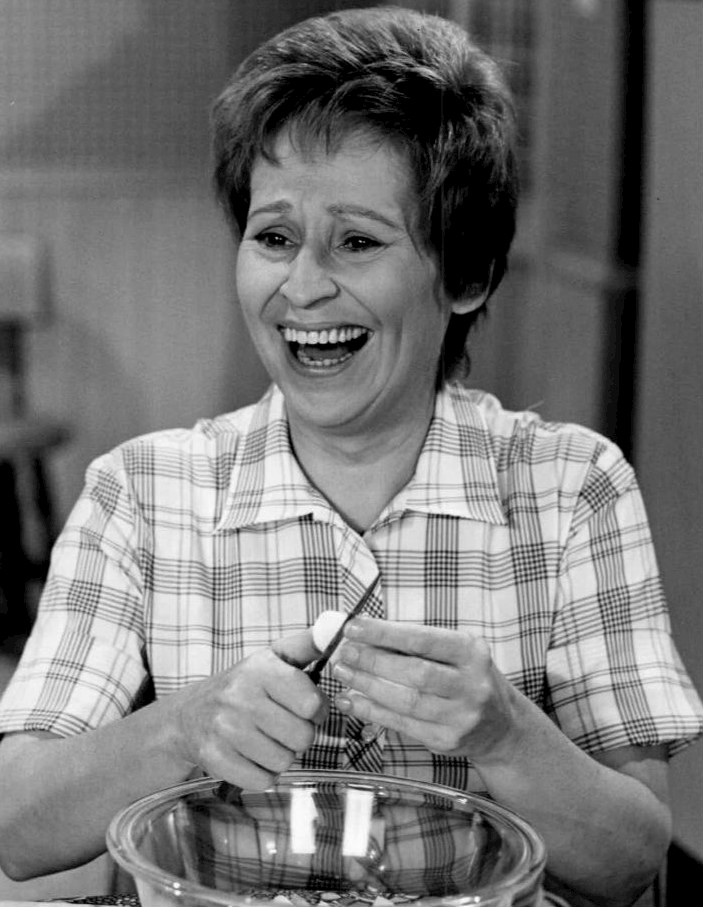
- Ghostley in Mayberry R.F.D. (1970)
- Born: Alice Margaret Ghostley; August 14, 1923; Eve, Missouri, U.S.
- Died: September 21, 2007 (aged 84); Studio City, California, U.S.
- Occupations: Actress, singer
- Years active: 1953–2007
- Spouse: Felice Orlandi (m. 1953; died 2003)

Alice Margaret Ghostley (August 14, 1923 – September 21, 2007) was an American actress and singer on stage, film and television. Ghostley was best known for her roles as bumbling witch Esmeralda (1969–72) on Bewitched, as Cousin Alice (1970–71) on Mayberry R.F.D., and as Bernice Clifton (1986–93) on Designing Women.

Ghostley dropped out of the University of Oklahoma to pursue a career in theater. She first starred on Broadway in New Faces of 1952 and in the film version of the play released in 1954. She portrayed recurring characters on several sitcoms, including Bewitched (1969-1972), Mayberry R.F.D., Nichols (1971–72) and The Julie Andrews Hour (1972–73). Between 1986 and 1993, Ghostley portrayed Bernice Clifton on Designing Women. Over the years, Ghostley had numerous guest starring roles, including on Hogan's Heroes, Good Times, Maude, One Day at a Time, The Odd Couple, What's Happening!!, Evening Shade, and The Golden Girls. She also appeared in film in To Kill a Mockingbird (1962), Gator, the film version of Grease, in the 1985 comedy Not for Publication, and in the direct-to-video movie Addams Family Reunion.

Ghostley received a Tony nomination in 1963 for her roles in the comedy The Beauty Part. She also received a Tony Award for Best Featured Actress for her role in The Sign in Sidney Brustein's Window and, in 1992, she was nominated for an Emmy for her role in Designing Women.

== Early life ==
Alice Margaret Ghostley was born on August 14, 1923 at a train station in Eve, Missouri, to Edna Muriel (née Rooney) and Harry Francis Ghostley, who worked as a telegraph operator. Ghostley grew up in Siloam Springs Arkansas and Henryetta, Oklahoma. She attended the University of Oklahoma, but dropped out to pursue a career in theater.

== Career ==
=== Stage ===
Alice Ghostley first came to Broadway in Leonard Sillman's New Faces of 1952 and in the film version released in 1954. Her featured number was "The Boston Beguine", a comic song about finding romance and danger in the very proper Boston, Massachusetts. Ghostley recorded her vocal for an RCA Victor 45-rpm single; the other side was New Faces co-star Eartha Kitt singing "Monotonous".

=== Television ===
Ghostley established herself as a plain-looking, sad-smiling comedienne in early television. She appeared as Joy, one of the ugly stepsisters in the 1957 musical television production of Richard Rodgers and Oscar Hammerstein's Cinderella, which starred Julie Andrews in the title role. The other stepsister was played by actress Kaye Ballard. Twelve years later, Ghostley guest-starred as a harried maternity nurse on Ballard's comedy series, The Mothers-in-Law. Ghostley guest-starred on the NBC police comedy, Car 54, Where Are You? with Joe E. Ross and Fred Gwynne, filmed in New York. In the musical episode "Christmas at the 53rd", she sang the comic torch song "Irving". She also appeared in two 1961 episodes of The Tom Ewell Show. She was also a favorite of Jackie Gleason, who featured her in his "American Scene Magazine" variety hours of the 1960s. In the recurring sketch "Arthur and Agnes", Gleason played a loudmouthed, inconsiderate braggart talking to Ghostley on her front stoop. Gleason's character treated her thoughtlessly for several minutes before walking away, leaving Ghostley alone to confide to the audience, "I'm the luckiest girl in the world!"

She portrayed recurring characters on several situation comedies, beginning with Bewitched in 1966 in "Maid to Order", in which Ghostley played an inept maid named Naomi, who was hired by Darrin Stephens (played by Dick York) to assist his wife Samantha (Elizabeth Montgomery) during her pregnancy. Towards the end of the series' 1965–66 season, actress-comedienne Alice Pearce, who was featured as nosy neighbor Gladys Kravitz, died. The producers of the series immediately offered the role of Gladys to Ghostley, who refused it. As a result, in the fall of 1966, character actress Sandra Gould assumed the role of Gladys. In September 1969, after the death of actress Marion Lorne, who played Aunt Clara, Ghostley joined Bewitched as a semiregular in the role of Esmeralda, a shy witch who served as a maid and babysitter to the Stephenses' household. Ghostley's character of Esmeralda was created to replace Aunt Clara's role as a bumbler of magic.

Ghostley's Esmeralda appeared in 15 episodes of Bewitched between 1969 and 1972. During her two years on Bewitched, Ghostley also joined the cast of Mayberry R.F.D., playing Cousin Alice after Frances Bavier's character, Aunt Bee, was written out of the series. She appeared in 14 episodes.

On February 22, 1969, she appeared as Aggie on The Ghost & Mrs. Muir (starring Edward Mulhare and Hope Lange). The episode was entitled "Make Me a Match". The captain and Mrs. Muir matched her with Claymore Gregg (Charles Nelson Reilly). On March 6, 1970, she appeared on another episode of The Ghost & Mrs. Muir, "Curious Cousin". She played nosey Cousin Harriet, who interferes with Mrs. Muir's private life. To divert her excessive attention, Claymore, posing as Captain Gregg, comes to court her.

After eight years, Bewitched was canceled by ABC in the spring of 1972. Later that year, in September, Ghostley was hired as a semiregular for the ABC-TV variety series, The Julie Andrews Hour; in addition to participating in songs and sketches, Andrews and Ghostley were featured in a recurring segment as roommates sharing a small apartment. The Julie Andrews Hour was cancelled by ABC in the spring of 1973 after 24 episodes. Throughout the 1970s and 1980s, Ghostley appeared in episodes of situation comedies such as Hogan's Heroes (alternating with Kathleen Freeman playing Gertrude Linkmaier, General Burkhalter's sister) and Mrs. Field Marshal Manheim, Good Times, Maude, One Day at a Time, The Odd Couple, and What's Happening!!.

Between 1986 and 1993, Ghostley portrayed Bernice Clifton, the slightly off-kilter, eccentric friend to Julia and Suzanne Sugarbaker's mother, Perky, on Designing Women. She later played Irna Wallingsford in six episodes of Evening Shade. She also had a recurring role of Ida Mae Brindle in the sitcom Small Wonder, which ran from 1985 to 1989. Among many other guest roles, she appeared in a flashback episode as the crazed mother-in-law of Dorothy Zbornak (Bea Arthur) on The Golden Girls. She made a one-time appearance as Great-Grandma in Sabrina the Teenage Witch. Ghostley also made a few guest appearances on the daytime drama Passions in 2000, playing the ghost of Matilda Matthews.

=== Film ===
Among her roles in motion pictures, Ghostley appeared in To Kill a Mockingbird (1962), playing Stephanie Crawford, the neighborhood gossip. She starred in Gator as Gator's partner in crime who brings her cats along on a burglary. She appeared in the film version of Grease as shop teacher Mrs. Murdock. In 1985, she had a supporting role in the Nancy Allen comedy Not for Publication. Alice played Grandmama in the direct-to-video movie Addams Family Reunion.

== Awards ==
Ghostley received a Tony nomination in 1963 for different roles she played in the Broadway comedy The Beauty Part. She won a Tony Award for Best Featured Actress for her role in The Sign in Sidney Brustein's Window. In 1992, she earned an Emmy nomination for her role in Designing Women.

== Personal life and death ==
Alice Ghostley was married to Felice Orlandi, an Italian-American actor, from 1953 until his death in 2003.

Ghostley died at her home in Studio City, California, on September 21, 2007, of colon cancer and a series of strokes.

== Selected filmography ==
- New Faces (1954) - Herself
- To Kill a Mockingbird (1962) - Miss Stephanie Crawford
- My Six Loves (1963) - Selena Johnson
- The Flim-Flam Man (1967) - Mrs. Packard
- The Graduate (1967) - Mrs. Singleman
- With Six You Get Eggroll (1968) - Molly
- Viva Max (1969) - Hattie
- Ace Eli and Rodger of the Skies (1973) - Sister Lite
- Gator (1976) - Emmeline Cavanaugh
- Blue Sunshine (1977) - O'Malley's Neighbor
- Record City (1978) - Worried Wife
- Rabbit Test (1978) - Nurse Tumm
- Grease (1978) - Mrs. Murdock
- Not for Publication (1984) - Doris Denver
- The Odd Couple II (1998) - Esther, the Whiner
- Addams Family Reunion (1998, TV Movie) - Grandmama Addams
- Palmer's Pick-Up (1999) - Mrs. Eleanor Palmer
- Whispers: An Elephant's Tale (2000) - Tuskless (voice)
- Mothers and Daughters (2006) - The Doctor (final film role)

== Select television credits ==
- Lights Out as Chambers' Secretary (1951, "Perchance To Dream")
- The Best of Broadway as Clara Hyland (1955, "The Show-Off")
- Star Stage (1955, "A Letter to Mr. Priest")
- Playwrights '56 as Mrs. Hope (1956, "Flight")
- The United States Steel Hour as Ida Routzeng (1959, "A Taste of Champagne" and 1962; Episode - "You Can't Escape")
- Dow Hour of Great Mysteries as Charlotte (1960, "The Dachet Diamonds")
- Play of the Week (1960, "Highlights of New Faces")
- Art Carney Special (1961, "Everybody's Doin' It!")
- The Tom Ewell Show as Polly (1961, "The Chutney Caper") and as Lavinia Barrington (1961, "I Don't See It")
- Car 54, Where Are You? as Bonita Kalsheim (1961, "Christmas at the 53rd" and "Love Finds Muldoon")
- Naked City as Clara, the Bookkeeper (1963, 'One, Two, Three, Rita Rakahowski")
- The Trials of O'Brien as Eve Roberti (1965, "The Trouble with Archie")
- Bewitched as Naomi Hogan (1966, "Maid to Order") and as Esmeralda (1969-1972, 15 appearances)
- Get Smart as Verna (1966, "The Last One in Is a Rotten Spy") and as Naomi Farkas (1968, "The Farkas Fracas")
- Please Don't Eat the Daisies as Miss Feather (1966, "Move Over, Mozart")
- The Farmer's Daughter as Jane Marshall (1966, "The Wife of Your Friend May Not Be a Friend of Your Wife)
- Captain Nice as Mrs. Nash (1967, 15 appearances)
- Insight as Mother (1968, "Watts Made Out of Thread")
- He & She as Norma Nugent (1968, "What's in the Kitty?")
- Love, American Style as Mrs. Silversmith (1969), Mrs. Billingsley (1971), Mom (1971) and Gladys (1972)
- The Mothers-in-Law as Mrs. Irene Wiley (1969, "And Baby Makes Four")
- It Takes a Thief as Miss Prillo (1969, "The Second Time Around")
- Hogan's Heroes as Gertrude Linkmaier (1969, "Watch the Trains Go By") and as Mrs. Mannheim (1971, "That's No Lady, That's My Spy")
- The Ghost & Mrs. Muir as Aggie Burns (1969, "Make Me a Match") and as Cousin Harriet (1970, "Curious Cousin")
- The Odd Couple as Mimi (1970, "The Breakup")
- Mayberry R.F.D. as Cousin Alice (1970-1971, 14 appearances)
- Nichols as Bertha (1971-1972, two appearances)
- Here We Go Again as Mrs. Nicholson (1973, "After the Wedding Bells")
- The New Temperatures Rising Show as Mrs. Lindsey (1972, "Ellen's Flip Side") and as Edwina Moffitt (1974, seven appearances)
- Kolchak: The Night Stalker as Doctor Agnes Temple (1974, "Bad Medicine")
- Great Performances as Mrs. Taylor (1975, "Who's Happy Now?")
- Big Eddie as Violet Klabber (1975, "Crashing Violet")
- Maude as Hazel M. Hathaway (1976, "Walter's Stigma")
- Mary Hartman, Mary Hartman as Gladys Dillworth (1976, two appearances)
- Monster Squad as Queen Bee (1976, "Queen Bee")
- All's Fair as Inez (1976, "Living Together")
- One Day at a Time as Harriet Loring (1977-1978, two appearances)
- What's Happening!! as Mrs. Turner (1977, "The Maid Did It")
- The Nancy Walker Show as Louise (1977, "The Partners")
- CHiPS as Mamie (1978, "Rustling")
- Police Woman as Manageress (1978, "Sunset")
- Carter Country (1978, "The Chief's Dressing Gown")
- Family as Mrs. Hanley (1978, "A Friend of the Family's") and others
- Chico and the Man as Harriett (1978, "The Peeping Tom")
- Friends as Mrs. Sandler (1979)
- Gimme a Break! as Mrs. Falconberg (1982, "Love Thy Neighbor")
- Madame's Place as Herself (1982, "The Nice Bernadette")
- Trapper John, M.D. as Marge Collins (1984, "The Fred Connection")
- Mama Malone as Nedda (1984, "Connie's Old Flame" & "Shall We Dance?")
- Tales from the Darkside as Elinor Colander (1985, "Anniversary Dinner")
- Highway to Heaven as Mrs. Schtepmutter (1985, "Cindy")
- Stir Crazy (1985, "The Love Affair")
- Designing Women as Bernice Clifton (1986-1993)
- Simon & Simon as Grandma Marie Cooper (1986, "Family Forecast")
- The New Leave It to Beaver as Miss Honeywell (1986, "Miss Honeywell Comes to Town")
- Punky Brewster as Mrs. Winston (1987, "Punky's Big Story")
- The Golden Girls as Mrs. Zbornak (1988, "Mother's Day")
- Small Wonder as Ida Mae Brindle (1988, four appearances)
- B.L. Stryker as Mrs. Parkinson (1990, "Night Train")
- Hearts Are Wild as Margaret Sawyer (1992, "Pilot")
- Evening Shade as Irna Wallingford (1992-1994, six appearances)
- Daddy Dearest as Aunt Adelaide (1993, "Thanks, but No Thanks")
- Cobra as Lorinda McClure (1994, "Lorinda")
- Diagnosis: Murder as Mrs. Groviak (1994, "You Can Call Me Johnson")
- The Client as Aunt Mabel (1996, "Damn Yankees")
- Aaahh! Real Monsters as Grandma (1996), voice of Nurse (1996), Eccentric Woman (1997), voice of Wife (1997)
- Touched by an Angel as Mrs. DeWinter (1997, "Labor of Love")
- Sabrina the Teenage Witch as Great-Grandma (1997, "Witch Trash")
- Rugrats as Mrs. Horkin (1997, "Lady Luck")
- Channel Umptee-3 as voice of Pandora Rickets (1997)
- Dharma & Greg as Alice Binns (1998, "Dharma and Greg's First Romantic Valentine's Day Weekend")
- 101 Dalmatians as Hester Hen, the town's witch (1998, one appearance)
- Hercules as Miss Cassiopeia (1998, four appearances)
- Passions as Matilda Matthews (2000, four appearances)
