= Today My Way =

Today My Way may refer to:

- Today My Way (Nancy Wilson album) 1965
- Today My Way (Patti Page album) 1967
- Today My Way, album by Oliver Nelson 1964
- Today My Way, album by Roger Williams (pianist) 1983
