= The Voice of Audrey Morris =

Studio album by Audrey Morris
- Released: 1956
- Recorded: July 1956
- Studio: Hollywood, California
- Genre: Jazz
- Length: 36:03
- Label: Bethlehem Records

The Voice of Audrey Morris is a 1956 studio album by jazz singer Audrey Morris arranged and conducted by Marty Paich and his orchestra. It was released on a vinyl LP on the Bethlehem Records label. The album was later paired with another album by Audrey Morris Bistro Ballads.

== Track listing ==
1. "I Never Mention Your Name" (Don George, Mack Davis, Walter Kent) - 2:58
2. "It's Always You" (Jimmy Van Heusen, Johnny Burke) - 3:18
3. "How 'Dja Like to Love Me" (Burton Lane, Frank Loesser) - 2:59
4. "Glad to Be Unhappy" (Richard Rodgers, Lorenz Hart) - 3:17
5. "What More Can a Woman Do" (Dave Barbour, Peggy Lee) - 3:19
6. "If Love Were All" (Noël Coward) - 2:49
7. "Blue Turning Gray Over You" (Andy Razaf, Fats Waller) - 2:37
8. "If You Could See Me Now" (Carl Sigman, Tadd Dameron) - 2:27
9. "I Go For That" (Frank Loesser, Matty Malneck) - 3:29
10. "I Wonder What Became of Me" (Harold Arlen, Johnny Mercer) - 3:10
11. "You Irritate Me So" (Cole Porter) - 3:08
12. "My Old Flame" (Arthur Johnston, Sam Coslow) - 2:32
