= Arthur Siegel =

Arthur Siegel may refer to:

- Arthur Siegel (musician) (1923–1994), American songwriter
- Arthur Siegel (photographer) (1913–1978), American photographer
