= Afterthought =

Afterthought is a thought or action following a previous act.

Afterthought(s) also may refer to:

== Music ==
- Afterthoughts (album), a 1985 album by Audrey Morris
- Afterthoughts, a 2013 album by Nosound
- Afterthought, an album by American hip hop producer Fat Jon
- "Afterthought", a song by In Fear and Faith on the 2010 album Imperial
- "Afterthought", a song by Disclosure on the 2015 album Caracal
- "Afterthought", a song by Joji & BENEE on the 2020 album Nectar
- "Afterthought", a song by Tame Impala on the 2025 album Deadbeat

== Other uses ==
- Afterthought (film), a 2015 film
- Afterthoughts (retailer), a defunct American retailer

== See also ==
- Epimetheus (mythology), might mean "hindsight", literally "afterthinker"
