= An Angel Comes to Brooklyn =

1945 film by Leslie Goodwins

- Directed by: Leslie Goodwins
- Screenplay by: June Carroll; Stanley Paley
- Story by: June Carroll; Lee Wainer
- Produced by: Armand Schaefer; Leonard Sillman
- Starring: Kaye Dowd; Robert Duke; David Street; Barbara Perry; Charles Kemper; Marguerite d'Alvarez
- Cinematography: Jack A. Marta
- Edited by: Tony Martinelli
- Music by: Joseph Dubin
- Production company: Republic Pictures
- Distributed by: Republic Pictures
- Release date: November 27, 1945
- Running time: 70 minutes
- Country: United States
- Language: English

An Angel Comes to Brooklyn is a 1945 American comedy film directed by Leslie Goodwins and written by June Carroll and Stanley Paley. The film stars Kaye Dowd, Robert Duke, David Street, Barbara Perry, Charles Kemper and Marguerite d'Alvarez. The film was released on November 27, 1945, by Republic Pictures.

== Cast ==
- Kaye Dowd as Karen James
- Robert Duke as David Randall
- David Street as Paul Blake
- Barbara Perry as Barbara
- Charles Kemper as Phineas Aloysius Higby
- Marguerite d'Alvarez as Madame Della
- Robert Scheerer as Bob
- Alice Tyrrell as Susie
- June Carroll as Kay
- Rodney Bell as Oscar
- Betzi Beaton as Tiny
- Jay Presson Allen as Miss Johnson
- Joe Cappo as Joe
- Sherle North as Roxie
- Billie Haywood as Theresa
- Cliff Allen as Cliff
- C. Montague Shaw as Sir Henry Bushnell
- Eula Morgan as Olga Ashley
- Gladys Gale as Sarah Gibbons
- Harry Rose as Michael O'Day
- Frank J. Scannell as Brian Hepplestone
- Jack McClendon as Shadow Dancer
- Wilton Graff as Rodney Lloyd
- Jimmy Conlin as Cornelius Terwilliger
- Ralph Dunn as Sgt. O'Rourke
