= Julius Monk =

Julius Withers Monk (November 10, 1912, Spencer, North Carolina – August 17, 1995, New York City) was an American impresario in the New York cabaret scene. His 1956 revue, Four Below, has been characterized as "the first legitimate cafe revue in New York City"

== Biography ==
Monk was born into a well-heeled and well-established family of North Carolina. After training at the Cincinnati Conservatory of Music, he earned his living playing piano in New York City and France, then became manager in 1942 of the New York nightclub Le Ruban Bleu, owned by Herbert Jacoby. In 1956, Monk left that establishment for San Francisco's the hungry i, where he did duty as master of ceremonies. Soon, Murray Grand, new manager of the Downstairs Room (formerly the Purple Onion), recalled Monk to Manhattan. On March 4, 1956, his opening revue, Four Below (starring Dody Goodman) was a triumph. (It was characterized as "the first legitimate cafe revue in New York City" by James Gavin, author of the 1991 book Intimate Nights, The Golden Age of New York Cabaret.) At the new venue (Upstairs At The Downstairs on West 56th Street), Monk then staged a succession of revues by writers such as Tom Jones and Harvey Schmidt (later collaborators on The Fantasticks), Sheldon Harnick, Louis Botto, Herb Hartig, Gerry Matthews, John Meyer, and Tom Poston.

Monk's annual revues established the standard for New York cabaret over the following decade: Take Five (1957), Demi-Dozen (1958), Four Below Strikes Back (1959), Pieces of Eight (1959), Dressed to the Nines (1960) and 7 Come 11 (1961). Friction between Monk and owner Irving Haber prompted the former to leave and in 1962 he and Thomas Hammond opened a new nightclub — the Rendezvous Room (Plaza 9) — at the Plaza Hotel. There his troupe continued with revues such as Dime A Dozen (1962), Baker's Dozen (1964), and Bits & Pieces XIV (1964).

Monk's last revue at the Plaza, Four In Hand, closed on June 29, 1968 after which he retired. He died at age 82 in August 1995 at his home in Manhattan.

== Discography ==
- Four Below Strikes Back; Offbeat Records (OLP 4017): Julius Monk Revue - Julius Monk Revue [1959]
  - Overture and Opening
  - Leave Your Mind Alone
  - Mr. X
  - It's a Wonderful day to Be Seventeen
  - Castro Tango!
  - Charlie Chan
  - Sitwells
  - Merry-Go, Merry-Go-Round
  - Jefferson Davis Tyler's General Store
  - Four Seasons/Speak No Love
  - Constant Nymphet
  - Man Tan
  - Lola Montez
  - Family Fallout Shelter
  - Literary Time
  - Love, Here I Am
  - Payola
- Take Five with Ronny Graham; Offbeat Records (OLP 4013): Julius Monk Revue;– Ronny Graham, Ceil Cabot, Ellen Hanley, Jean Arnold, Gerry Matthews [5/1958]
  - Introductory "Notes"
  - "You've Got to Open the Show"
  - Roger, the Rabbit
  - Westport/Portofino
  - Jefferson Davis Tyler's General Store
  - Gristedes
  - Say Hello
  - Poets' Corner
  - Pro Musica Antiqua
  - Gossiping Grapevine
  - Night Heat
  - Finale-Doing the Psycho-Neurotique
- Julius Monk Presents Demi-Dozen; Offbeat Records (OLP 4015) - Julius Monk Revue [1/1959]
  - Grand Opening^
  - Yes Sirree
  - Mister Off-Broadway^
  - You Fascinate Me So
  - Conference Call
  - The Holy Man and the New Yorker^
  - The Race of the Lexington Avenue Express^
  - Sunday in New York
  - Intellectual's Rag
  - Seasonal Sonatina^
  - One and All^^
  - Portofino
  - Guess Who Was There
  - 3rd Avenue El
  - Statehood Hulu^
  - Grand Finale — Monk's Merrie Minstrel Show!

(^ lyric by Tom Jones, music by Harvey Schmidt; ^^music and lyric by Harvey Schmidt)

- Pieces of Eight; Offbeat Records (OLP 4016): Julius Monk Revue - Julius Monk Revue [1959]
  - Overture
  - Happiness is a Bird
  - And Then I Wrote
  - Radio City Music Hall
  - Miss Williams
  - Uncle Bergie Evans Show
  - Oriental
  - Ardent Admirer
  - Steel Guitars and Barking Seals
  - Election Spectacular
  - A Name of Our Own
  - M'Lady Chatterley
  - Seasons' Greetings
  - Farewell
  - Everybody Wants to Be Loved
  - Night the Hurricane Struck
  - A Conversation Piece
- Julius Monk presents Tammy Grimes (1959)
- Julius Monk Simply Plays (and / or Vice-versa) - 1959
- Seven Come Eleven; Columbia Records LP (55477): Julius Monk Revue - New York Cast [1961]
- Dressed to the Nines MGM E3914 OC

Cecil Cabot, Gordon Connell, Bill Hinnant, Gerry Matthews, Pat Ruhr, Mary Louise Wilson with William Roy and Carl Norman at the Plural Pianos

  - Overture/Gala Opening — The Theater’s in the Dining Room/Dressed to the Nines
  - Tiny Town
  - And that Was He & She
  - Sociable Amoeba
  - Con Edison
  - Come In and Browse
  - The Hate Song
  - A Word from Our Sponsor
  - Bring Back the Roxy to Me
  - Nanny
  - Smoke
  - Names
  - Billy's Blues
  - Ft. Lauderdale
  - Un-Expurgated Version
  - Finale-Reprise—Dressed to the Nines
- It's Your Fault
- Dime A Dozen; Cadence Records LP (CLP 3063, mono; CLP 25063, stereo): Julius Monk Revue - New York Cast [1962]
