= Marguerite d'Alvarez =

English opera singer (died 1953)

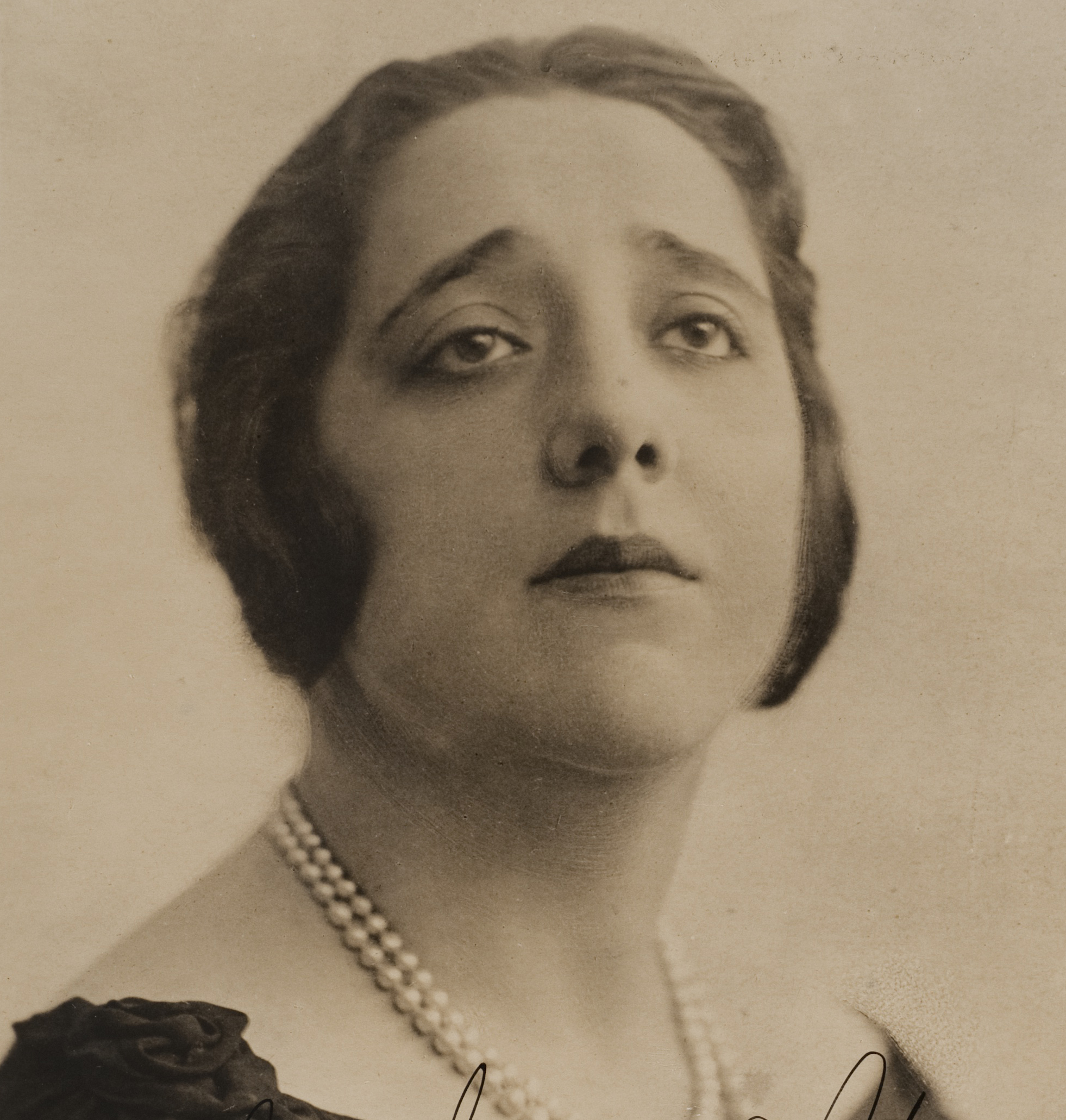
- Marguerite d'Alvarez, 1922, photo by Lassalle
- Born: Margarita Amelia Álvarez de Rocafuerte; 1880s Bootle, England
- Died: 1953; Alassio, Italy
- Other name: Marguerite Alvares de Rocafuerte

Marguerite d'Alvarez (c. 1884 – 18 October 1953) was an English contralto, born Margarita Amelia Álvarez de Rocafuerte. She sang on the opera and concert stages, for recordings, and in radio concerts, and appeared in four films.

== Early life ==
D'Alvarez was born in Bootle, England, though she is sometimes mentioned as being born in Peru. Her father, Benjamín Álvarez de Buenavista, was a Peruvian diplomat, and her mother was French. Her brother was also a diplomat. She studied at the Brussels Conservatoire.

== Career ==
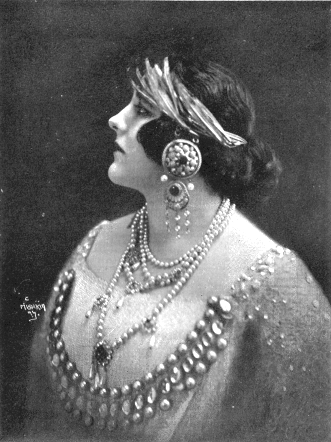
Marguerite d'Alvarez

D'Alvarez made her debut in Rouen in 1907, singing in Samson and Delilah. After further studies in Paris she made her first American appearances with the Manhattan Opera Company in 1909 as Fidès in Giacomo Meyerbeer's Le prophète. Following her season in New York City, she went to London to help Oscar Hammerstein inaugurate his London Opera in 1911; that year, she scored great successes in French roles.

D'Alvarez subsequently appeared at leading European opera houses such as Covent Garden, and also sang in Chicago and Boston, and made a tour of Australia and New Zealand after World War I. In 1923, she was praised by Queen Mary after a recital at London's Queen's Hall. She was guest soloist at a concert in Indianapolis in 1925. She sang in radio concerts in 1926 and 1927. In 1929, she headlined in a "Pan-American Program" in Washington, D.C.

In 1926, d'Alvarez defended jazz from its European detractors, including composers Richard Strauss and Pietro Mascagni. "I want to live to the tunes of Irving Berlin and go to my grave while Whiteman's orchestra plays the Gershwin Rhapsody in Blue", she said in response. "It is the twentieth century itself — energy, spice, sparkle and flavor. Those who deplore it belong in the mummy case. It is speed and fun."

D'Alvarez made several acoustic recordings in New York, including arias from her operatic repertoire and Spanish songs by Manuel de Falla, Ruperto Chapí and Ignacio Tabuyo. She also made four films, Till We Meet Again, in 1944, An Angel Comes to Brooklyn (1945), Pandora and the Flying Dutchman (1951) and Affair in Monte Carlo (1952). Her autobiography, Forsaken Altars, was published in 1954.

== Later life ==
D'Alvarez died in 1953, in Alassio, Italy.

== Bibliography ==
- David Ewen, Encyclopedia of the Opera, Hill and Wang; enlarged edition (1963), ISBN 978-1135528751
