= Monotonous (song) =

1952 musical theatre song

"Monotonous" is a popular song written by June Carroll and Arthur Siegel for Leonard Sillman's Broadway revue New Faces of 1952. The song was written based on the experiences of its singer Eartha Kitt. It was performed, at the insistence of Kitt, on three chaise longues (Kitt tried originally for six and was given three in compromise), crawling cat-like from one to the other, demonstrating her flexibility and her dance training from the Katherine Dunham Company. The song also includes references to many well-known figures of the early 1950s. People referenced in the song include:

- Montgomery Clift
- Jacques Fath (the song states that he made a new style for Eartha Kitt, based on when she opened the club Le Perroquet, and Fath provided her with a completely new wardrobe as he admired her body).
- Johnnie Ray ("I even made Johnnie Ray smile for me")
- Harry S. Truman
- T. S. Eliot
- Farouk of Egypt
- Sherman Billingsley
- Chiang Kai-shek
- Gayelord Hauser
- Dwight David Eisenhower, referred to as "Ike"
