= At Long Last Love (song) =

1938 show tune by Cole Porter

"At Long Last Love" is a popular song written by Cole Porter, for his 1938 musical You Never Know, in which it was introduced by Clifton Webb.

== Other recordings ==
- Nancy Wilson, Gentle Is My Love, 1965
- Frank Sinatra, A Swingin Affair!, 1957
