= June Carroll =

American lyricist, singer and actress (1917–2004)

June Carroll (1917 – May 16, 2004) was an American lyricist, singer and actress.

Born June Sillman in Detroit, Michigan. In 1945, she wrote songs for the Roy Rogers/Dale Evans musical Western The Man From Oklahoma as well as was the co-writer for An Angel Comes to Brooklyn, which she also acted in as the character Kay . In the following year, Carrol wrote the lyrics as well as co-wrote the book with Robert Duke for the 1946 musical comedy play If the Show Fits. Carroll later appeared in the Broadway musical New Faces of 1952, introducing the now-standard "Guess Who I Saw Today", by Elisse Boyd and Murray Grand, as well as two songs that she had written with Arthur Siegel, "Penny Candy" and "Love Is a Simple Thing". The Sauter-Finegan Orchestra recorded "Love Is a Simple Thing", as well as Steve Lawrence having recorded the song for his album ...All About Love (1959). The first verse of the song is the following:

Love is a simple thing

Love is a silver ring

Shiny as a ribbon bow, soft as a quiet snow

Love is a nursery rhyme

Old as the tick of time

She and Siegel also wrote "Monotonous", introduced by Eartha Kitt in the show. For the show, the song was a showstopper (a performance that generates so much applause that the production is temporarily paused).

== Personal life ==
She was the sister of the Broadway producer Leonard Sillman, who produced New Faces of 1952, and the wife of Sidney Carroll, the screenwriter. She had four children, including composer Steve Reich from her first marriage, in 1935, as well as Leonard Reich, and Jonathan Carroll and David Carroll, American authors, from her second marriage, in 1940.

Carroll died from complications of Parkinson's disease in Los Angeles at the age of 86.
