= Charles Kemper =

American actor (1900–1950)

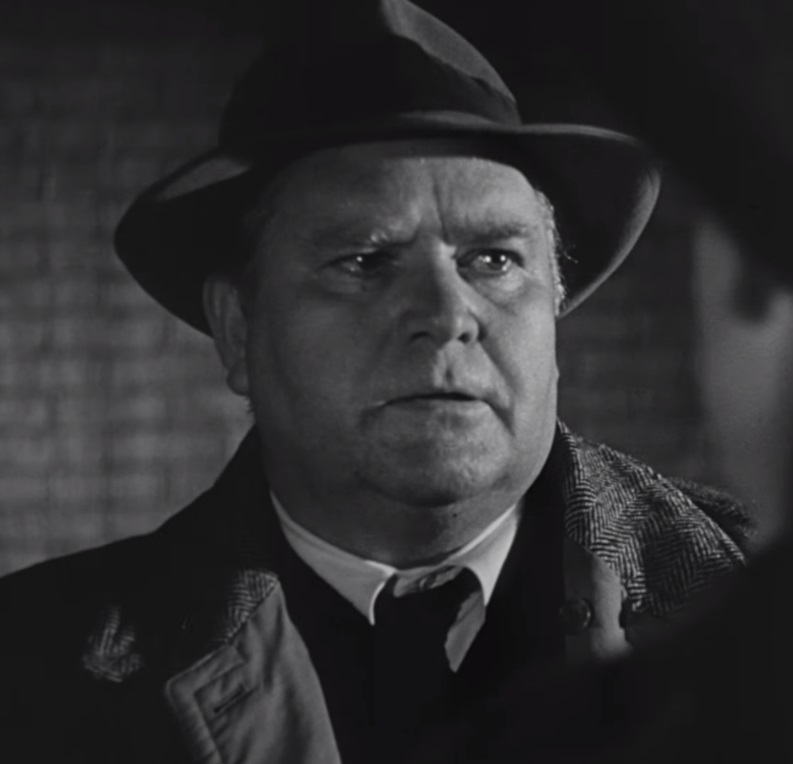
- Charles Kemper in On Dangerous Ground, 1951
- Born: September 6, 1900; Hennessey, Oklahoma, U.S.
- Died: May 12, 1950 (aged 49); Burbank, California, U.S.
- Resting place: Holy Cross Cemetery, Culver City; Plot: Section C, Lot 206, Grave 1
- Occupation: Film actor
- Years active: 1929–1950

Charles Kemper (September 6, 1900 – May 12, 1950) was an American character actor born in Oklahoma. The heavy-set actor was for decades a successful stage actor.

== Movie career ==
Like many actors in New York, Charles Kemper worked in short comedies filmed at the Pathé, Vitaphone, and Paramount studios, beginning in 1929. In 1936 he was featured in the Broadway revue New Faces of 1936, and he was signed by Educational Pictures as a leading comic, playing timid characters in the tradition of Educational's silent-era star Lloyd Hamilton. He soon became a foil for Educational's newest find Danny Kaye, who was then a dialect comedian. Kemper and Kaye might have continued in these miniature sketches, but the studio ceased production in 1937; the last of the Kemper comedies was released in mid-1938.

In 1945 Kemper returned to films as a character actor in Hollywood. Kemper had memorable supporting roles in films including The Southerner (1945), Scarlet Street (1945), Gallant Journey (1946), The Shocking Miss Pilgrim (1947), and the film noir On Dangerous Ground (as Pop Daley, his last film role).

Kemper died at the age of 49 when he was involved in a car accident in Burbank, California.

== Filmography ==
Year	Title	Role	Notes
1929	Wednesday at the Ritz	Drunk	leading role in short comedy
1935	The Officer's Mess	Sarge	Shemp Howard short
1937-1938	Two-reel comedies for Educational Pictures	various	
1941	Waiting for Baby	Mr. Theakstis	Robert Benchley short
1945	The Southerner	Tim	
1945	An Angel Comes to Brooklyn	Phineas Aloysius Higby	
1945	Scarlet Street	Homer Higgins	
1946	Gallant Journey	Father 'Dickie' Ball	
1946	Sister Kenny	Mr. McIntyre	
1947	The Shocking Miss Pilgrim	Herbert Jothan	
1947	King of the Wild Horses	Rudy	
1947	Gunfighters	Sheriff Kiscaden	
1947	That Hagen Girl	Jim Hagen	
1948	Fury at Furnace Creek	Peaceful Jones	
1948	Fighting Father Dunne	Emmett Mulvey	
1948	Belle Starr's Daughter	Deputy Gaffer	
1948	Yellow Sky	Walrus	
1949	Adventure in Baltimore	Mr. Steuben	
1949	The Doolins of Oklahoma	Thomas 'Arkansas' Jones	
1949	Intruder in the Dust	Crawford Gowrie	
1950	The Nevadan	Sheriff Dyke Merrick	
1950	Stars in My Crown	Prof. Sam Houston Jones	
1950	A Ticket to Tomahawk	Chuckity	
1950	Wagon Master	Uncle Shiloh Clegg	
1950	Where Danger Lives	Police Chief	
1950	Mr. Music	Mr. Danforth	
1950	California Passage	Sheriff Willy Clair	
1951	On Dangerous Ground	Pop Daley	(final film role)
