= Frances Dewey Wormser =

American actress

Frances Dewey Wormser (June 23, 1903 – January 28, 2008) was an American stage actress, entertainer and vaudeville performer.

== Personal life ==
Frances Dewey was born in New York City on June 23, 1903, the daughter of Alfred James Dewey (1874–1958), a California artist who was considered the "dean" of an early art colony in Sierra Madre, California. She later took up painting herself.

Dewey married her first husband, Orin Zoline, in the later 1930s, approximately the same time that she retired from entertaining. Zoline died in the 1950s. She married her second husband, Morton Wormser, during the same decade. They lived in Sarasota, Florida, for over 25 years. Morton Wormser was an avid tennis player and supporter of the sport. As a result of this interest, professional tennis player Martina Navratilova lived with Frances and Morton when she first arrived in the United States in the early 1970s.

Frances and Morton Wormser traveled "around the world" on their honeymoon. She took her last major trip to visit friends in Maui when she was 100 years old. She was a major contributor to the Aviation Museum of Santa Paula, which she supported in honor of her brother, pilot Jim Dewey.

== Career ==
Dewey spent more than a decade in showbusiness during the 1920s and 1930s. She played the lead role in a number of shows, including the 1925 revival of Sally, Irene & Mary. It was her performance in The Girl Friend in 1926, which caught the attention of producer Lew Fields. Fields created the Dewey and Gold Revue, specifically for Dewey and her professional performing partner, Al Gold. Dewey and Gold toured together on the Pantages Circuit in 1927 and 1928. She toured in Good Boy in 1929.

Wormser also performed with Cary Grant (who was still using his name of Archie Leach) and Jeanette MacDonald in an out-of-town tryout of Boom Boom in late 1928, which was one of Grant's earliest roles. She later appeared in Shoot the Works, a 1931 revue on Broadway by Heywood Broun. Dewey was also featured in the very first franchised list of Leonard Sillman's New Faces in 1934. Silman's New Faces introduced audiences to new up-and-coming Broadway actors, such as Wormser. The 1934 first edition of New Faces also included Henry Fonda and Imogene Coca. Coca became a lifelong friend of Frances Wormser, who also counted Leo Lerman, the former editor of Vogue Magazine and editor-in-chief of Vanity Fair, to be her professional "soul mate". He died in 1994.

Dewey officially retired from the entertainment industry during the 1930s. She was a buyer for Jane Engel, a women's clothing company, around this time.

== Death ==
Frances Dewey Wormser died on January 28, 2008, from natural causes in Santa Paula, California. She was 104 years old. She had no children.
