= Eve, Missouri =

Unincorporated community in Missouri, U.S.

Coordinates: 37°50′23″N 94°35′01″W

Eve is an unincorporated community in Vernon County, in the U.S. state of Missouri.

== History ==
Eve was originally called "Clayton Station", and under the latter had its start when the railroad was extended to that point. A post office called Clayton was established in 1872, the name was changed to Eve in 1885, and the post office closed in 1914. The change in name was required by postal officials in order to prevent repetition with another Clayton in the state.

== Notable person ==
- Alice Ghostley (1923-2007), actress known for appearing on the television shows Designing Women and Bewitched
