= Fighting Father Dunne =

1948 film directed by Ted Tetzlaff

- Theatrical poster of the film
- Directed by: Ted Tetzlaff
- Screenplay by: Martin Rackin; Frank Davis
- Story by: William Rankin
- Produced by: Phil L. Ryan
- Starring: Pat O'Brien; Darryl Hickman; Charles Kemper; Una O'Connor; Arthur Shields; Harry Shannon; Joe Sawyer; Myrna Dell; Ruth Donnelly
- Cinematography: George E. Diskant
- Edited by: Frederic Knudtson
- Music by: Roy Webb (composer); Constantin Bakaleinikoff (director)
- Production company: RKO Radio Pictures
- Release date: June 19, 1948 (US)
- Running time: 93 minutes
- Country: United States
- Language: English

Fighting Father Dunne is a 1948 American biographical film about the life of Father Peter Dunne, and the creation of his News Boys Home in St. Louis, Missouri. Directed by Ted Tetzlaff, the screenplay was written by Martin Rackin and Frank Davis, based on an original story by William Rankin. The film stars Pat O'Brien as Fr. Dunne, along with Darryl Hickman, Charles Kemper, Una O'Connor, Arthur Shields, Harry Shannon, Joe Sawyer, Myrna Dell, and Ruth Donnelly.

== Plot ==
In St. Louis, renovations are about to begin on the News Boys' Home and Protectorate. Fred Carver approaches the men about to rip up the sidewalk out front, and asks that they preserve a slab of the sidewalk which contains two sets of footprints: his as a boy, and those of Father Dunne. The workers do not know who Father Dunne was, and Carver begins to relate the tale of the late priest, and creation of the building they stand in front of.

In 1905 St. Louis, newspapers employ young boys, many of them orphans to deliver their papers. One brutally cold morning, one of the homeless boys, falls ill and can't work. His two friends, Tony and Jimmy, not knowing what to do, go to Father Dunne's parish where they tell the priest of their concerns. Dunne accompanies the two youths to where their friend lives: in a cardboard box. After he takes the three boys to his sister Kate's house, he convinces her and her husband Emmett to take the boys in on a temporary basis until he can figure out a more permanent solution.

Dunne visits his Archbishop John Joseph Glennon and tells him of his intent to build a home for the newsboys and other children who live on the street. The Archbishop pledges to support Dunne's efforts, but makes it clear that the diocese is not in a financial position where they can contribute any money to the project. Undaunted, Father Dunne uses his winning personality and gifts of persuasion, to cajole, harangue, and otherwise convince local business people to support his project. Using the donations, Dunne rents a run-down townhouse, and begins to refurbish it, again convincing local businesses to donate the materials for the renovation. He also enlists the help of a local attorney, Thomas Lee, to help him in his negotiations, as well as providing free legal council.

As the house gets more and more fixed up, the number of youths staying there grows. In addition to providing them food and shelter, Father Dunne also provides guidance to the young men, attempting to help them turn into productive members of society. Dunne particularly works hard on one of the more sullen, violent youths, Matt Davis, who has been physically abused by his alcoholic father. Eventually, Dunne becomes aware that the adolescents under his care are being violently bullied by some of the older teenagers who also compete in selling papers. He at first attempts to talk to the manager at the paper in charge of sales, but his efforts are frustrated. Matt then organizes the boys at the home to work as a group, in support of one another, in order to offset the larger, stronger teenagers. While it is initially successful, the violence begins to ratchet up, eventually leading to a violent confrontation which sees the horse which has been loaned to the boys to help them deliver the papers killed, and Jimmy's leg is crushed under a wagon wheel. Matt blames himself for the altercation, and flees the home in shame.

Father Dunne then convinces Michael O'Donnell, who had loaned the boys the horse, to threaten to evict the newspaper from their building, since he owns it. The newspaper then relents and intervenes on the boys' behalf with the older delivery boys, averting further violence. Dunne then turns his efforts into raising money to build a larger, more permanent home for the boys. While he is doing that, he also continues to search for Matt. He eventually finds him, but cannot convince to him to leave his abusive father and return to the home.

Eventually, O'Donnell and Lee help Dunne form a board of directors to help raise money for the permanent home, and it is eventually built. After it opens, Matt arrives to ask for help from Dunne. He is fleeing from the police, after having almost been caught during a robbery. Dunne agrees to help him, but convinces him that the first step is to turn himself in. Before he can, however, they are surprised by a police officer. Matt mistakes him for his drunken father and shoots him, killing him.

Matt surrenders, but is sentenced to death. Even though Dunne intercedes on his behalf with the governor, the execution is carried out. While he was unsuccessful with Matt, Father Dunne gets solace from the boys waiting for him when he returns to the home, all of whom he has saved.

== Cast ==
- Pat O'Brien as Father Peter J. Dunne
- Darryl Hickman as Matt Davis
- Charles Kemper as Emmett Mulvey
- Una O'Connor as Miss O'Rourke
- Arthur Shields as Mr. Michael O'Donnell
- Harry Shannon as Thomas Lee
- Joe Sawyer as Steve Davis
- Anna Q. Nilsson as Mrs. Olaf Knudson
- Donn Gift as Jimmy
- Myrna Dell as Paula Hendricks
- Ruth Donnelly as Kate Mulvey
- James Nolan as Policeman Danny Briggs
- Billy Cummings as Tony
- Billy Gray as Chip
- Eric Roberts as Monk
- Gene Collins as Lefty
- Lester Matthews as Archbishop John Joseph Glennon
- Ray Walker as Fred Carver
- Griff Barnett as Governor
- Jason Robards Sr. as J.J. Sonin
- Dot Farley as Mrs. Monohan (uncredited)
- Rudy Wissler as Boy Soloist

== Production ==
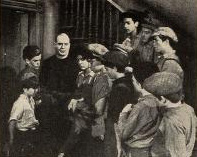
O'Brien surrounded by his street urchins

RKO announced that they would be releasing the film for industry screenings on May 11, 1948. The film had two working titles, Father Dunne's Newsboys Home and Father Dunne's Home. Actor Roddy McDowall screen-tested for the cast, but did not appear in the film. In May 1948, Matthew L. Davis sued RKO for $300,000, stating his reputation had been damaged by the portrayal of the character Matt Davis (played by Darryl Hickman) in the film.

== Reception ==
The Film Daily gave the film a positive review, calling it "well done", and saying it "seizes the audience's attention at the outset and maintains it until the very end and getting off en route a few dozen compassionate, comic, slick and at various times intense moments of drama." They praised O'Brien's performance, as well as both the direction by Tetzlaff and Phil Ryan's production. The magazine felt that Rackin and Davis had done a fine job of adapting the story by Rankin. The picture also received a good review from Harrison's Reports, which called it a "fine drama, with strong emotional appeal". They compared it favorably to Boys Town, which had been released a decade earlier. Calling O'Brien's performance excellent, they applauded the way the film blended pathos and comedy. Modern Screen was less kind. Although they had an overall positive review, they felt that O'Brien's performance was simply adequate, and the script was mediocre. They did enjoy Una O'Connor's performance, and felt Hickman was brilliant as the young murderer.

Not all reviews were positive. Thomas M. Pryor of The New York Times called the film "too weighted with sentimentalism to be effective as drama," with performances "so deliberately calculated to wrench one's heart that they are ineffectual." John McCarten of The New Yorker also dismissed the film, writing that Father Dunne's "work, although commendable, isn't very exciting."
