= Audrey Morris =

American singer (1928–2018)

Background information
- Born: November 12, 1928; Chicago, Illinois
- Died: April 1, 2018 (aged 89) Chicago, Illinois
- Genre: Jazz
- Occupations: Singer, pianist
- Instrument: Piano
- Spouse: Stu Genovese (m. 1949 - 2003; his death)
- Website: audreymorris.com

Audrey Morris (November 12, 1928 – April 1, 2018) was an American singer and pianist during the 1950's who specialized in jazz ballads. She recorded albums on her own label, Fancy Faire Records.

== Early life ==
Morris was born on November 12, 1928, in the South Side of Chicago, Illinois. She attended classical piano lessons in her childhood. Through the radio broadcasts of Your Hit Parade, she developed an interest in songs. During her early years in school, she wrote lyrics for songs. Her idols included Billie Holiday, Lee Wiley, Mildred Bailey, and Peggy Lee, who were the inspiration for her own songs.

== Career ==
In 1950, she began performing in the Capitol Lounge and four years later began singing at the newly opened venue Mister Kelly's. She recorded her first album in 1955 Bistro Ballads Sung By Audrey Morris for the RCA sub-label "X" and The Voice of Audrey Morris the following year for Bethlehem Records. As her career progressed, she became more and more popular in the jazz music scene, attracting local jazz legends such as Bev Kelly, Lurlean Hunter, and Pat Morrissey, who all admired her singing voice.

She was offered the opportunity to record an album of film theme music for Warner Brothers. In the following years, she continued to perform locally. She was the leader of a trio at London House, a jazz piano club. In the late 1960s, she limited her performances to her family. In 1981 she attended another engagement at Palmer House. Morris also made numerous appearances on Chicago television and radio stations. In 1985, she released the album Afterthoughts (with her husband Stu Genovese). By the mid-1980s, Morris' musical career had become so extensive that Oscar Peterson (a close friend of hers') referred to her as "a walking musical encyclopedia".

== Personal life ==
Morris married Stu Genovese in 1949. The marriage lasted until Stu's death in 2003.

== Death ==
Morris died at the age of 89 on April 1, 2018, at Presence Resurrection Medical Center in Norwood Park, Chicago.

== Discography ==
- Bistro Ballads Sung by Audrey Morris (X, 1956)
- The Voice of Audrey Morris (Bethlehem, 1956)
- Afterthoughts (Fancy Faire, 1985)
- Film Noir (Fancy Faire, 1989)
- Look At Me Now (Audiophile, 1997)
