= Easy (Nancy Wilson album) =

Studio album by Nancy Wilson
- Released: May 1968
- Recorded: April 1968
- Genre: Pop, R&B, vocal jazz
- Length: 31:24
- Label: Capitol
- Producer: David Cavanaugh

Nancy Wilson chronology
Welcome to My Love (1967)	Easy (1968)	The Best of Nancy Wilson (1968)

Professional ratings
Review scores
Source	Rating
AllMusic	2.5/5 stars
The Virgin Encyclopedia of Jazz	3/5 stars

Easy is a studio album by Nancy Wilson, released in May 1968 by Capitol Records. It features arrangements by Jimmy Jones and was produced by David Cavanaugh. The opening and closing tracks are composed by Antônio Carlos Jobim.

In his review at AllMusic, Stephen Cook praises Wilson's "sultry and assured delivery" but criticizes the charts by Jimmy Jones. Cook notes "a few standout tracks, like the assured and dramatic version of 'Gentle On My Mind' and the single 'Face It Girl, It's Over.'"

The album reached No. 5 on the Hot R&B LPs chart and No. 51 on the Billboard Top LPs.

The single "Face it Girl, it's Over" peaked at No. 15 on the Hot Rhythm & Blues Singles chart and No. 29 on the Billboard Hot 100. It is a longer edit (3:09) than the LP version and features a non-album track, "The End of Our Love," as the B-side.

== Reissues ==
Easy was reissued in 1978 by Capitol Records (Capitol SM-11802) but did not include the song "Walk Away."

In 2016, the album was finally released on compact disc and in a streaming version by Caroline Records, in association with SoulMusic Records. It was paired with Welcome to My Love, Wilson's previous album. The CD reinstates the song "Walk Away" and includes four bonus tracks from the Easy sessions.

== Track listing ==
=== Side 1 ===
1. "Wave" (Antônio Carlos Jobim) - 2:45
2. "Make Me a Present of You" (Joe Greene) - 2:49
3. "Gentle on My Mind" (John Hartford) - 2:40
4. "When I Look in Your Eyes" (Leslie Bricusse) - 2:56
5. "Love Is Blue (L'Amour Est Bleu)" (André Popp, Pierre Cour, Brian Blackburn) - 2:10
6. "Walk Away" (Don Black, Udo Jürgens) - 3:44

=== Side 2 ===
1. "Face It Girl, It's Over" (Andy Badale, Frank Stanton) - 2:37
2. "The Look of Love" (Burt Bacharach, Hal David) - 2:25
3. "One Like You" (Gene DiNovi, Tony Velona) - 3:44
4. "Make Me Rainbows" (Marilyn Bergman, Alan Bergman, John T. Williams) - 2:30
5. "How Insensitive (Insensatez)" (Jobim, Vinícius de Moraes, Norman Gimbel - 3:04

=== 2016 CD Bonus Tracks ===
1. "The End of Our Love" (Charles Singleton, Nancy Wilson) - 2:22
2. "Anytime" (Herbert Lawson) - 2:19
3. "Hurry Change (If You’re Coming)" (Arthur Feldman, Tennyson Stephens) - 4:02
4. "No Easy Way Down" (Gerry Goffin, Carole King) - 3:07

== Personnel ==
- Nancy Wilson - vocals
- Jimmy Jones - arranger, conductor
- H. B. Barnum - arranger, conductor ("Face it Girl, it's Over")
- David Cavanaugh - producer
