= New Faces of 1952 =

1952 musical revue

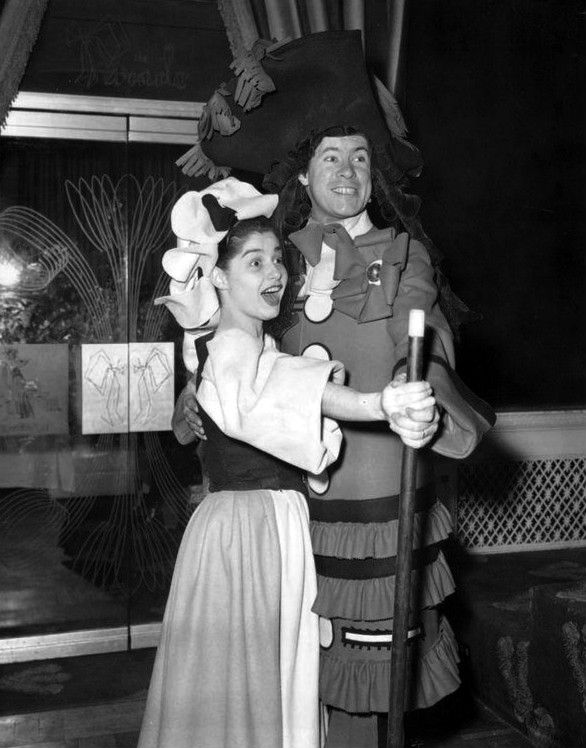
Carol Lawrence and George Smiley take the "Restoration" skit into the Ambassador Hotel, Chicago, in 1953.

New Faces of 1952, also known as Leonard Sillman's New Faces of 1952, is a 1952 musical revue with songs and comedy skits, produced and conceived by Leonard Sillman. It was the fourth of Sillman's seven New Faces revues, each intended to showcase the rising stars of that time; the other years for which "New Faces of ..." revues were produced were 1934, 1936, 1943, 1956, 1962, and 1968. New Faces of 1952 was the most successful of the series, and is generally considered the best, for both the talent of the performers and the quality of the writing. The show ran on Broadway for nearly a year in 1952, and helped launch the careers of Paul Lynde, Alice Ghostley, Eartha Kitt, Robert Clary, Carol Lawrence, Ronny Graham, performer/writer Mel Brooks (as Melvin Brooks), and lyricist Sheldon Harnick.

Songs from the show include "Monotonous", sung by Eartha Kitt in the show and identified with her throughout her career; "Guess Who I Saw Today", sung by June Carroll in the show and subsequently recorded by numerous singers, most notably Nancy Wilson; and "Love is a Simple Thing", sung in the show by Rosemary O'Reilly, Robert Clary, Eartha Kitt, and June Carroll and later recorded by artists including Sauter-Finegan Orchestra, Debbie Reynolds, Arthur Siegel, Jane Morgan, Carmen McRae and the Muppets.

New Faces of 1952 was adapted as a 1954 film, titled simply New Faces, which included the original cast. In 1982, the revue had an off-Broadway revival at the Equity Library Theatre.

== Broadway production ==
The revue opened on Broadway at the Royale Theatre on May 16, 1952, and ran for 365 performances. It was produced by Leonard Sillman, directed by John Murray Anderson and John Beal with choreography by Richard Barstow. The sketches were written by Graham and Brooks. The songs were composed by, among others, Harnick, Graham, Murray Grand, Elisse Boyd, and Arthur Siegel. The cast featured Graham, Kitt, Clary, Virginia Bosler, June Carroll, Virginia De Luce, Ghostley, Patricia Hammerlee, Lawrence, Lynde and Bill Milliken. De Luce and Graham won the 1952 Theatre World Award. The revue marked Kitt's Broadway debut, singing a "sultry rendition" of "Monotonous", a tongue-in-cheek lament of how boring her ridiculously successful life was.

=== Songs ===
Act I

- Opening (Ronny Graham, Peter DeVries) and Company
- Lucky Pierre (Ronny Graham) – Pierre (Robert Clary), Reporter and Chorus
- Guess Who I Saw Today (Elisse Boyd, Murray Grand) – June Carroll
- Restoration Piece – Lady Sylvia Malpractice, Simple, Sir Solemnity Sourpuss and Sir Militant Malpractice
- Love Is a Simple Thing (lyrics by June Carroll, music by Arthur Siegel) – Rosemary O'Reilly, Eartha Kitt, Robert Clary, June Carroll
- Boston Beguine (Sheldon Harnick) – Alice Ghostley
- Nanty Puts Her Hair Up (Herbert Farjeon, Siegel) – Nanty, Father, Mother, Brother and Highlander
- Time for Tea (Carroll-Siegel) – Marcella, Lavinia, Lavinia, the Girl, Marcella, the Girl, Mother, Father, John and Guest
- Bal Petit Bal (Francis Lemarque) – Eartha Kitt, Robert Clary
- Three for the Road, medley: It's Raining Memories/Waltzing in Venice/Take Off That Mask (Graham)

Act II

- Don't Fall Asleep (Graham) – Wife and Husband
- After Canasta—What? – Dorothy and Elsie
- Lizzie Borden (Michael Brown) – Townsperson, Man, Judge, Lizzie and District Attorney
- I'm in Love with Miss Logan (Graham) – Boy, Miss Logan and Man
- Trip of the Month – The Explorer
- Penny Candy (Carroll, Siegel) – Woman, Gussie, Poor Kid, Rich Kid and Candy Vendor
- Convention Bound
- Whither America? (Another Revival?) – Switchboard Operator, Stenographer and Man
- Monotonous (Carroll, Siegel) – (Sung by Eartha Kitt)
- The Great American Opera – Toby, Madame Flora and Effie
- He Takes Me Off His Income Tax (Siegel, Carroll) – Virginia de Luce. Song begun, then interrupted four times throughout the show, before 1) Boston Beguine, 2) Nanty Puts Her Hair Up, 3) Three for the Road medley, and 4) I'm in Love with Miss Logan.

=== Sketches ===
The show featured three non-musical sketches. "Of Fathers and Sons", written by Mel Brooks, was a parody of the Arthur Miller drama Death of a Salesman with characters Mae, Harry, Stanley and Policeman; a pickpocket is angry with his son for not wanting to join the family business. In "Oedipus Goes South", Ronny Graham parodies Truman Capote. Paul Lynde, wrapped in bandages, bemoans his African safari. In "The Bard and the Beard" the characters – Miss Leigh, Sir Laurence, Call Boy and Maid – try to remember what play they are supposed to be in.

Brooks' sketch had originally been written for another revue, Curtain Going Up, which did not make it to Broadway due to an unsuccessful tryout in Philadelphia. Sillman and Graham had seen the show during its tryout and asked Brooks for permission to include the sketch in New Faces of 1952 instead, which Brooks happily granted.

== Film adaptation ==
Retitled New Faces, the film version was directed by Harry Horner in Cinemascope and Eastmancolor, and released by Twentieth Century Fox on March 6, 1954. Ronny Graham, Eartha Kitt, Robert Clary, Alice Ghostley, June Carroll, Virginia De Luce, Carol Lawrence, Patricia Hammerlee, Paul Lynde, and Bill Millikin repeated their stage roles. The film was basically a reproduction of the stage revue with a thin plot added. The plot involved a producer and performer (Ronny Graham) in financial trouble on opening night. A wealthy Texan offers to help out, on the condition that his daughter be in the show.

The song order was changed, and some songs were added and removed. Songs added include:

- "Crazy, Man!" (Lynde, Graham)
- "Uska Dara" (Kitt)
- "C'est si bon" (Kitt)
- "Santa Baby" (Kitt)

The songs omitted were:

- "Nanty Puts her Hair Up" (though an abridged version was used as an instrumental in a dance routine)
- "Don't Fall Asleep"

The song "Love is a Simple Thing" omitted the final verse, which references Charles Addams. An extra verse was added to "Lizzie Borden". Some of the lines in "Monotonous" were replaced and updated: "Harry S. Truman plays bop for me" was changed to "Toscanini plays bop for me", and "Ike likes me" was changed to the opening notes of the Dragnet theme, followed by the words "They wrote it for me".

== Cast recording ==
Leonard Sillman's New Faces Of 1952

Cast recording by Original Cast
- Released: Late 1952 or early 1953
- Length: 50:06 (LP); 55:20 (CD 2009 re-issue)
- Label: RCA Victor
- Director: John Beal
- Producer: Leonard Sillman

Leonard Sillman's New Faces Of 1952 (Original Cast) was the official release of the cast recording of the Broadway revue New Faces of 1952. The album was originally released on a 12" LP by RCA Victor, LOC-1008. Some material was excluded, as not all songs could fit on the record. In 1977, the album was reissued on the RCA Red Seal label, catalog number CBM1-2206.

The cast recording, like the play, was produced by Leonard Sillman. The orchestral conductor for the album and play was Anton Coppola. Orchestral arrangements were by Ted Royal. Alice Ghostley, Allen Conroy, Bill Mullikin, Carol Lawrence, Carol Nelson, Eartha Kitt, Jimmy Russell, Joseph Lautner, June Carroll, Michael Dominico, Patricia Hammerlee, Paul Lynde, Robert Clary, Ronny Graham, Rosemary O'Reilly, Virginia Bosler, and Virginia de Luce all perform on the album.

In 2003, Jasmine Records reissued the cast album on compact disc for the first time, featuring the original RCA LP track listing. In 2009, Sony Music, which now owns the RCA Victor archive, released the album on CD (catalog number Arkiv RCA-04441) and digital download. This second CD reissue included the previously unreleased song "Time For Tea" performed by June Carroll and Alice Ghostley.

=== Track listing ===
12" Long Play

Track listings and credits adapted from the original label notes of album, unless other wise specified.

Side A
No.	Title	Writer(s)	Performer(s)	Length
1.	"Opening"	Peter DeVries; Ronny Graham	Ronny Graham and Company	2:11
2.	"Lucky Pierre"	Ronny Graham	Robert Clary; Virginia de Luce; Rosemary O'Reilly; Patricia Hammerlee; Bill Mullikin	3:20
3.	"Boston Beguine"	Sheldon Harnick	Alice Ghostley Introduced by Virginia de Luce	4:42
4.	"Love Is A Simple Thing"	Arthur Siegel; June Carroll	Rosemary O'Reilly; Robert Clary; Eartha Kitt; June Carroll; Introduced by Virginia de Luce	5:08
5.	"Nanty Puts Her Hair Up"	Arthur Siegel; Herbert Farjeon	Alice Ghostley; Joe Lautner; (with Virginia Bosler; Bill Mullikin; Allen Conroy); Introduced by Virginia de Luce	4:42
6.	"Guess Who I Saw Today"	Elisse Boyd; Murray Grand	June Carroll	2:20
7.	"Bal, petit bal"	Francis Lemarque	Eartha Kitt Introduced by Robert Clary	2:58
Total length:				25:21

Side B
No.	Title	Writer(s)	Performer(s)	Length
1.	"Three For The Road" a. "Introduction" b. "Raining Memories" c. "Waltzing In Venice" d. "Take Off The Mask"	Ronny Graham Ronny Graham Ronny Graham	Virginia de Luce Robert Clary: Rosemary O'Reilly; Joe Lautner; Alice Ghostley; Ronny Graham and Company	5:23
2.	"Penny Candy"	Arthur Siegel; June Carroll	June Carroll and Company	3:26
3.	"Don't Fall Asleep"	Ronny Graham	Rosemary O'Reilly	2:10
4.	"I'm In Love With Miss Logan"	Unknown	Robert Clary: (with Rosemary O'Reilly; Joe Lautner); Introduced by Virginia de Luce	3:57
5.	"Monotonous"	Arthur Siegel; June Carroll	Eartha Kitt	3:47
6.	"Lizzie Borden"	Michael Brown	Joe Lautner; Bill Mullikin; Paul Lynde; Patricia Hammerlee and Company	4:57
7.	"(He Takes Me Off His Income Tax)"	Arthur Siegel; June Carroll	Virginia de Luce	1:05
Total length:				24:45

2009 re-issues

Features previously unreleased song "Time For Tea".

CD and Digital release
No.	Title	Performer(s)	Length
1.	"Opening"	Ronny Graham	2:11
2.	"Lucky Pierre"	Robert Clary; Virginia de Luce; Rosemary O'Reilly; Patricia Hammerlee; Bill Mullikin	3:20
3.	"Guess Who I Saw Today"	June Carroll	2:20
4.	"Love Is A Simple Thing"	Virginia de Luce; Rosemary O'Reilly; Robert Clary; Eartha Kitt; June Carroll	5:08
5.	"Boston Beguine"	Virginia de Luce; Alice Ghostley	4:42
6.	"Nanty Puts Her Hair Up"	Virginia de Luce; Alice Ghostley; Joe Lautner; Virginia Bosler; Bill Mullikin; Allen Conroy	4:42
7.	"Time For Tea"	June Carroll; Alice Ghostley	5:14
8.	"Bal, petit bal"	Robert Clary; Eartha Kitt	2:58
9.	"Three For The Road"	Virginia de Luce; Robert Clary; Rosemary O'Reilly; Alice Ghostley; Ronny Graham; Joe Lautner	5:23
10.	"Don't Fall Asleep"	Rosemary O'Reilly	2:10
11.	"Lizzie Borden"	Joe Lautner; Bill Mullikin; Paul Lynde; Patricia Hammerlee	4:57
12.	"I'm In Love With Miss Logan"	Virginia de Luce; Robert Clary; Rosemary O'Reilly; Joe Lautner	3:57
13.	"Penny Candy"	June Carroll	3:26
14.	"Monotonous"	Eartha Kitt	3:47
15.	"He Takes Me Off His Income Tax"	Virginia de Luce	1:05
Total length:			55:20

== 1982 revival ==
The Equity Library Theatre in New York City presented an Off-Broadway revival in 1982, directed by Joseph Patton and featuring comedic performances by Lillian Graff, Philip Wm. Mckinley, Alan Safier, and Randy Brenner in the roles originated by Ghostley, Lynde, Graham, and Clary, respectively. Kitt joined the cast late in the run to re-create her original role.
