= Nick Del Calzo =

American photographer and journalist

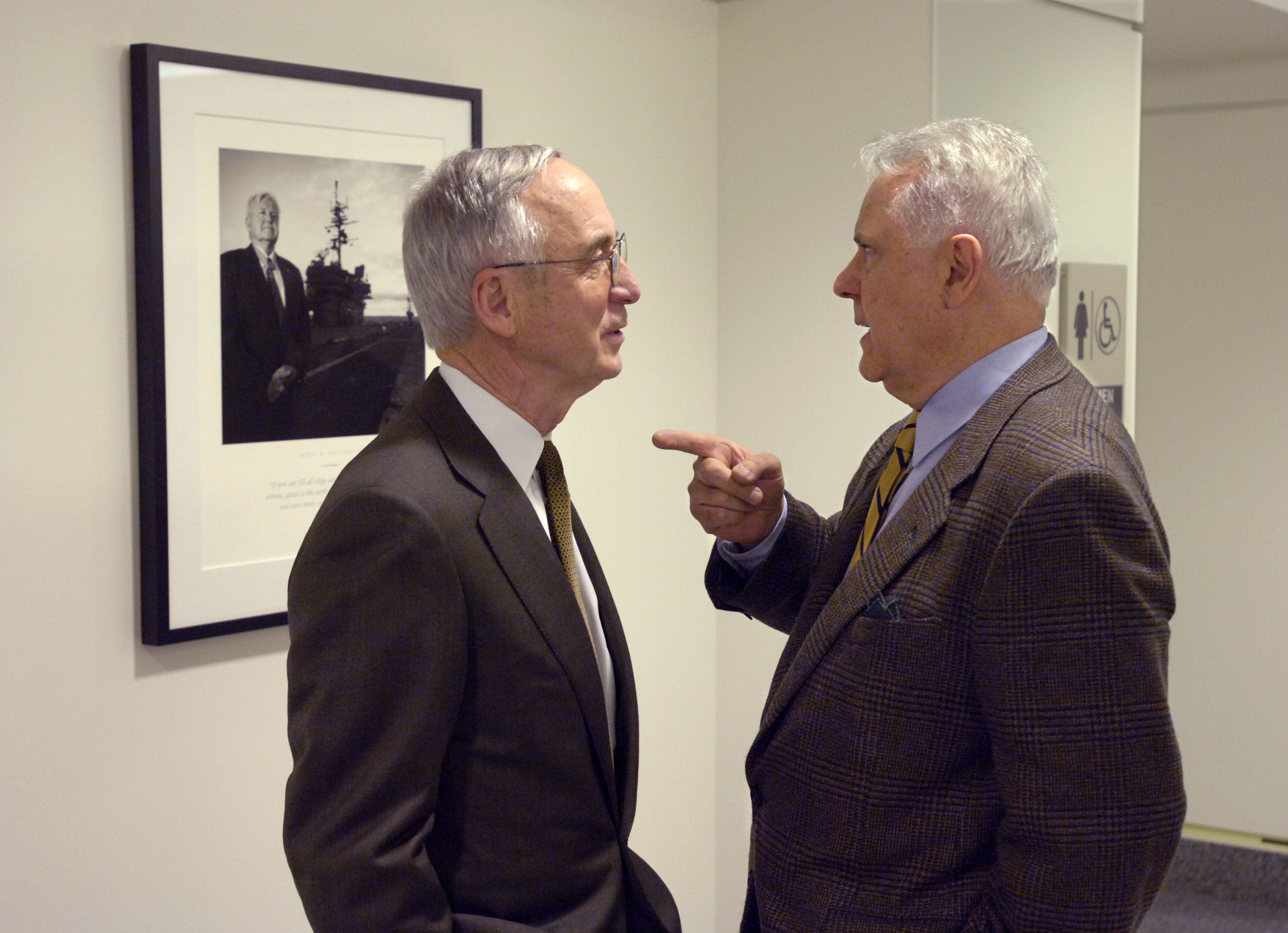
Nick DelCalzo (right)

Nick Del Calzo is an American photographer and journalist, who specializes in portraits.

== Career ==
Del Calzo had previously worked as a public relations executive, prior to retirement.

His portraits have been featured on the CBS Sunday Morning Show and CNN.

=== Medal of Honor ===
This portraits of recipients of the Medal of Honor forms the basis for the book Medal of Honor, which is now in its 3rd edition. It also is part of an exhibition, which is on permanent display in the Hall of Heroes at the Pentagon and at the Center for American Values in Pueblo, Colorado.

== Works ==
- Del Calzo, Nick, Renee Rockford, and Linda J. Raper. The Triumphant Spirit: Portraits & Stories of Holocaust Survivors, Their Messages of Hope & Compassion. Denver, CO: Triumphant Spirit Pub, 1997. ISBN 0965526003 OCLC 36563756
- In Honored Glory.
- Del Calzo, Nick, and Peter Collier. Medal of Honor: Portraits of Valor Beyond the Call of Duty. New York: Artisan, 2011. ISBN 9781579654627 OCLC 712124011
- Del Calzo, Nick, and Peter Collier. Wings of Valor: Honoring America's Fighter Aces. Annapolis, Maryland : Naval Institute Press, 2016.ISBN 9781591146414 OCLC 945951309

== Personal life ==
Del Calzo lives in Denver, Colorado.
