= Afterthoughts (album) =

Studio album by Audrey Morris
- Released: 1985
- Studio: Universal Studios, Chicago, Illinois
- Genre: Jazz
- Length: 64:07
- Label: Fancy Faire Records

Afterthoughts is a 1985 studio album by jazz singer Audrey Morris, along with her husband Stu Genovese. It was recorded at Universal Studios in Chicago, Illinois and released on vinyl LP and CD (1990) on Fancy Faire Records.

== Track listing ==
1. "Mira" (Bob Merrill) - 4:19
2. "Too Far Above Me" (David Heneker) - 3:09
3. "Dreamer" (Antonio Carlos Jobim, Gene Lees) - 2:49
4. "You Are For Loving" (Ralph Blane, Hugh Martin) - 3:01
5. "My Silent Love" (Edward Heyman, Dana Suesse) - 4:51
6. "I'm a Dreamer, Aren't We All?" (Lew Brown) - 4:12
7. "Fools Fall in Love" (Irving Berlin) - 4:31
8. "Nobody" (Alex Rogers, Bert Williams) - 3:21
9. "I Don't Stand a Ghost of a Chance With You" (Bing Crosby, Ned Washington, Victor Young) - 2:19
10. "Very Good Advice" (Sammy Fain, Bob Hilliard) - 4:19
11. "Rain Sometimes" (Arthur Hamilton) - 3:37
12. "His Own Little Island" (Ray Evans, Jay Livingston) - 3:44
13. "But I Loved You" (Gordon Jenkins) - 4:26
14. "Time Heals Everything/I Won't Send Roses" (Jerry Herman) - 4:46
15. "And I Was Beautiful" (Jerry Herman) - 1:51
16. "These Foolish Things (Remind Me of You)" (Harry Link, Holt Marvell, Jack Strachey) - 5:30
17. "Afterthoughts" (Gene DePaul, Caroline Leigh) - 3:22
