= Ronny Graham =

American actor, director and composer

- Born: Ronald Montcrief Stringer; August 26, 1919; Philadelphia, Pennsylvania, U.S.
- Died: July 4, 1999 (aged 79); Los Angeles, California, U.S.
- Occupations: Actor; theater director; composer; writer
- Years active: 1959–1999

Ronny Graham (August 26, 1919 – July 4, 1999) was an American actor, theater director, composer, lyricist, and writer.

== Life and career ==
Graham was born Ronald Montcrief Stringer in Philadelphia, Pennsylvania, the second of five children born to vaudeville performers Florence (née Sweeney) and Thomas Graham Stringer (a.k.a. Steve Graham). Graham, a self-taught jazz pianist, began his career as a nightclub comic with a specialty in wry character monologues for which he provided the musical accompaniment, à la Dwight Fiske. During World War II, Graham served in the Army, where he entertained GIs with a piano trio. He made his Broadway debut in the revue New Faces of 1952, to which he contributed sketches and lyrics and in which he performed. He won a Theatre World Award for his efforts. He later made similar contributions to New Faces of 1956 and New Faces of 1962. He wrote the lyrics for Bravo Giovanni, which garnered him a Tony Award nomination, and directed a string of unsuccessful plays, two of which closed on opening night, in the mid-1960s to early 1970s.

As a writer, Graham penned seven episodes of M*A*S*H (and guest starred as Sgt. Gribble in the episode "Your Hit Parade," for which he was program consultant) and nine episodes of The Brady Bunch Hour. He also co-wrote the screenplays for the Mel Brooks films To Be or Not to Be (1983) and Spaceballs (1987), appearing onscreen as Sondheim in the former and the Minister in the latter. His other film credits included roles in Dirty Little Billy (1972), Won Ton Ton, the Dog Who Saved Hollywood (1976), The World's Greatest Lover (1977) and History of the World, Part I (1981). He had a recurring role on Chico and the Man and made guest appearances on Murder She Wrote, Picket Fences, and Chicago Hope. He was a frequent guest on The Tonight Show Starring Johnny Carson. Graham played the character who dropped the clapperboard repeatedly in a 1969 Alka-Seltzer "Spicy Meatball" advertisement and played the part of "Mr. Dirt" on a series of commercials for Mobil Oil in the 1970s. In 1975–76, Graham was featured in the recurring role of the Reverend Bemis during season 2 of the NBC sitcom Chico and the Man. In 1976 he co-wrote the Paul Lynde Halloween Special along with Bruce Vilanch. In 1996, he appeared as the character Louis Foukold in the screen adaptation of the Jon Robin Baitz play The Substance of Fire.

Graham was married four times, to Jean Spitzbarth (1947–1950), with whom he had one child; actress Ellen Hanley (1951–1963), with whom he had two children; Sigyn Lund (1965–1973), with whom he had two children; and Pamela Gill (1974–1999), to whom he was married when he died of liver disease in Los Angeles.

== Filmography ==
- New Faces of 1952 (1952) - Ronny
- Dirty Little Billy (1972) - Charle Nile
- Won Ton Ton, the Dog Who Saved Hollywood (1976) - Mark Bennett
- The World's Greatest Lover (1977) - Director Dorsey
- M*A*S*H, Season 6, Episode 19, Your Hit Parade (1978) - Sergeant Gribble
- History of the World, Part I (1981) - Oedipus - The Roman Empire / Jew #2 - The Spanish Inquisition
- To Be or Not to Be (1983) - Sondheim
- Spaceballs (1987) - Minister
- Life Stinks (1991) - Priest (voice)
- Robin Hood: Men in Tights (1993) - Villager
- The Substance of Fire (1996) - Louis Foukold

== See also ==
- Julius Monk
