= How Glad I Am (album) =

1964 album by Nancy Wilson

Studio album by Nancy Wilson
- Released: August 1964
- Recorded: March–May 1964
- Venue: Los Angeles
- Length: 25:34
- Label: Capitol
- Producer: David Cavanaugh

Nancy Wilson chronology
Today, Tomorrow, Forever (1964)	How Glad I Am (1964)	The Nancy Wilson Show! (1965)

Singles from Natural High
- 1. "(You Don't Know) How Glad I Am" Released: June 8, 1964; 2. "It's Time For Me" Released: September 14, 1964

Professional ratings
Review scores
Source	Rating
AllMusic	3/5 stars
The Virgin Encyclopedia of Jazz	3/5 stars

How Glad I Am is a 1964 studio album by Nancy Wilson. It was one of her most successful albums, reaching #4 on the Billboard 200 and remaining on the chart for 31 weeks. The title track became her highest-charting single, peaking at #11 on the Billboard Hot 100, and earned her a Grammy Award for Best R&B Performance. The album also included two bossa nova songs by Antônio Carlos Jobim; two selections from the musical Funny Girl, which had recently opened its hit run on Broadway; a pair of tunes by Howlett Smith and Spence Maxwell; and a soul jazz number composed by Wes Montgomery, along with other material.

In a review of the 2009 re-issued version, Nick Dedina at AllMusic hailed the title track as "a tart, country-flavored soul number [that] remains a favorite of the British Northern soul scene." He also said, "the juicy, Hammond B-3-filled 'West Coast Blues' is the set's best number."

== Track listing ==
=== Side 1 ===
1. "(You Don't Know) How Glad I Am" (Jimmy Williams, Larry Harrison) – 2:37
2. "The Grass Is Greener" (Howlett Smith, Spence Maxwell) – 2:04
3. "The Boy From Ipanema (Garota De Ipanema)" (Antônio Carlos Jobim, Vinicius de Moraes, Norman Gimbel) – 2:13
4. "The Show Goes On" (Bernie Roth) – 2:16
5. "Don't Rain on My Parade" (Bob Merrill, Jule Styne) – 2:12
6. "Never Less Than Yesterday" (Richard Ahlert, Larry Kusik) – 2:21

=== Side 2 ===
1. "I Wanna Be With You" (Charles Strouse, Lee Adams) – 2:05
2. "It's Time For Me" (Smith, Maxwell) – 2:45
3. "People" (Merrill, Styne) – 3:40
4. "West Coast Blues" (Sascha Burland, Wes Montgomery) – 2:00
5. "Quiet Nights" (Jobim, Gene Lees) – 2:01

Note: Some versions of the LP mistakenly printed "It's Time for Me" as "It's Time To Go" on the front and back cover. In some cases, the song was not included on the album at all, and the track listing is slightly different.

== Personnel ==
- Nancy Wilson - vocals
- Gerald Wilson - arranger ("The Show Goes On" and "West Coast Blues")
- David Cavanaugh - producer
