= (You Don't Know) How Glad I Am =

Single by Nancy Wilson

from the album How Glad I Am
- B-side: "Never Less Than Yesterday"
- Released: 1964
- Recorded: 1964
- Genre: Easy listening
- Length: 2:39
- Label: Capitol
- Songwriters: Jimmy Williams; Larry Harrison

Nancy Wilson singles chronology
"Don't Rain on My Parade" (1964)	"(You Don't Know) How Glad I Am" (1964)	"I Wanna Be With You" (1964)

"(You Don't Know) How Glad I Am" is a song written by Jimmy Williams and Larry Harrison. In the US, its best-known recorded version is that by Nancy Wilson, a hit single for her, in the summer of 1964.

== Overview ==
Wilson, who had been recording since 1960, was afforded her first pop Top 40 hit with ..."How Glad I Am":

- (Nancy Wilson quote:)"I went into the studio with the idea of recording a Top 40 kind of hit [with '...How Glad I Am']. Actually though I didn't sing any differently.....It's the material itself that did it [along with] the arrangement."

The single went to No. 11 on the Hot 100, as well as No. 2 on the Billboard Pop-Standard Singles chart.

In April 1965 "(You Don't Know) How Glad I Am" received the Grammy Award for Best Rhythm & Blues Recording: Wilson was surprised by the categorization of "...How Glad I Am" as R&B as she would have classified it as a pop record, and the track had not been a major R&B hit peaking at No. 45 on the Cash Box R&B chart (the Billboard R&B chart was dormant throughout 1964).

Wilson would have one additional Top 40 hit after the success of "(You Don't Know) How Glad I Am": In 1968, "Face It Girl, It's Over", reached its peak position of 29.

== Other recordings ==
- Kiki Dee recorded "(You Don't Know) How Glad I Am" in 1964 with an arrangement - by Les Reed - based on the Nancy Wilson recording: Dee then remade the song as "How Glad I Am" in 1975, with an uptempo bluesy arrangement, and this version – produced by Gus Dudgeon and credited to the Kiki Dee Band – was issued that spring as the follow-up to "I've Got the Music in Me", reaching No. 33 in the UK and No. 74 in the US. The Kiki Dee band version also charted in the Netherlands (No. 16) and Flemish Belgium (No. 30)
- In 1980 Joyce Cobb had a single-release funk remake of "How Glad I Am": recorded at the Shoe Productions studio in Memphis, this version spent 13 weeks in the Record World Singles 101–150 chart, rising to No. 101 in September 1980 in which month Cobb's single ranked in the Bubbling Under Hot 100 Singles chart in Billboard and also in Billboard's R&B chart with respective peaks of No. 107 and No. 90.
- "(You Don't Know) How Glad I Am" has also been recorded by Bonnie Bramlett, Ellen Foley, Maria McKee, and - as "How Glad I Am" - by Fontella Bass, Aretha Franklin, the Greyboy Allstars, Brenda Lee, Olivia Newton-John, Sandie Shaw, Chrissie Hynde with the Valve Bone Woe Ensemble - "Valve Bone Woe" (2019) and The Living Sisters.
