= Today My Way (Nancy Wilson album) =

Studio album by Nancy Wilson
- Released: May 1965
- Recorded: May 1964–April 1965
- Venue: Los Angeles
- Genre: Pop
- Length: 24:57
- Label: Capitol
- Producer: David Cavanaugh

Nancy Wilson chronology
The Nancy Wilson Show! (1965)	Today My Way (1965)	Gentle Is My Love (1965)

Professional ratings
Review scores
Source	Rating
The Virgin Encyclopedia of Jazz	3/5 stars
Record Mirror	4/5 stars

Today My Way is a 1965 album by Nancy Wilson for Capitol Records. It reached number 7 on the pop album charts and number 2 on the RnB charts.

== Track listing ==
=== Side 1 ===
1. "Reach Out for Me" (Burt Bacharach, Hal David) – 2:26
2. "Welcome, Welcome" (Kay Rogers, June Tancy) – 2:20
3. "My Love, Forgive Me (Amore, Scusami)" (Mescoli, Pallavicini, Lee) – 2:23
4. "Dear Heart" (Henry Mancini, Ray Evans, Jay Livingston) – 2:07
5. "Don't Come Running Back To Me" (Sid Tepper, Roy C. Bennett) – 2:11
6. "And Satisfy" (Ronnell Bright) – 2:34

=== Side 2 ===
1. "You've Lost That Lovin' Feelin'" (Phil Spector, Barry Mann, Cynthia Weil) – 2:45
2. "Love Has Many Faces" (Mack David, David Raksin) – 1:49
3. "Take What I Have" (Jimmy Williams, Larry Harrison) – 2:17
4. "I'm All Smiles" (Herbert Martin, Michael Leonard) – 1:45
5. "If I Ruled the World" (Leslie Bricusse, Cyril Ornadel) – 2:20

== Personnel ==
- Nancy Wilson – vocals
- Sid Feller – arranger, conductor
- David Cavanaugh – producer
