= Gentle Is My Love =

1965 album by Nancy Wilson

Studio album by Nancy Wilson
- Released: July 1965
- Recorded: January 1965
- Venue: Los Angeles
- Genre: Vocal jazz
- Length: 30:52
- Label: Capitol
- Producer: David Cavanaugh

Nancy Wilson chronology
| Today – My Way (1965) | Gentle Is My Love (1965) | From Broadway with Love (1965) |

Professional ratings
Review scores
| Source | Rating |
|---|---|
| Allmusic | 3.5/5 stars |
| The Virgin Encyclopedia of Jazz | 3/5 stars |

Gentle Is My Love is a 1965 studio album by Nancy Wilson. It spent 24 weeks on the Billboard Top 200, peaking at No. 17, and reached No. 7 on the Hot R&B LPs chart. The album contains a mixture of standards from the Great American Songbook and more recent popular material.

In his AllMusic review, William Ruhlmann says that Gentle Is My Love is "a collection of romantic ballads that Wilson addresses with her characteristic emotionalism and precision. The arrangements are full of lush string parts, and the tempos are taken deliberately." Ruhlmann notes that Wilson covered several songs that were usually associated with men and performed as "soaring, heroic anthems," whereas she turns them into "more intimate, reflective ballads."

A 1970 re-issue of the album was entitled Who Can I Turn To.

== Track listing ==
=== Side 1 ===
1. "Who Can I Turn To (When Nobody Needs Me)" (Anthony Newley, Leslie Bricusse - 2:40
2. "There Will Never Be Another You" (Harry Warren, Mack Gordon - 2:40
3. "If Love Is Good To Me" (Fred Spielman, Redd Evans) - 3:10
4. "My One and Only Love" (Guy Wood, Robert Mellin - 2:57
5. "Funnier Than Funny" (Ronnell Bright) - 2:11
6. "More" (Riz Ortolani, Nino Oliviero, Marcello Ciorciolini, Norman Newell) - 3:10

=== Side 2 ===
1. "Gentle Is My Love" (Bill Schluger, Don Raye) - 2:36
2. "At Long Last Love (Cole Porter) - 2:30
3. "Time After Time" (Jule Styne, Sammy Cahn) - 2:55
4. "If Ever I Would Leave You" (Alan Jay Lerner, Frederick Loewe) - 2:52
5. "When He Makes Music" (Jack Segal, Marvin Fisher) - 3:11.

== Personnel ==
- Nancy Wilson - vocals
- Sid Feller - arranger, conductor
- David Cavanaugh - producer
