= Arthur Siegel (musician) =

American songwriter (1923–1994)

Arthur Siegel (December 31, 1923 - September 13, 1994) was an American songwriter.

Born on December 31, 1923, in Lakewood Township, New Jersey, he grew up in Asbury Park, New Jersey. Siegel studied acting at the American Academy of Dramatic Arts and studied music at the Juilliard School.

Hits he composed included "Monotonous" (written in collaboration with June Carroll, famously performed by Eartha Kitt), "Penny Candy", "Love is a Simple Thing" and "I Want You to Be the First One to Know". His work was featured prominently in the Leonard Sillman-produced revues New Faces of 1952, New Faces of 1956 and New Faces of 1962.

In 1962, Siegel collaborated with Kaye Ballard on an LP, Peanuts, on which he played Charlie Brown and she played Lucy Van Pelt from the album's comic strip namesake by Charles M. Schulz, dramatizing a series of vignettes drawn from the strip's archive.

Siegel released several recordings of himself performing his own music, including 1992's Arthur Siegel Sings Arthur Siegel and 1995's Live at the Ballroom.

Siegel died at the age of 70 on September 13, 1994, at his home in Manhattan due to heart failure.
