= Guess Who I Saw Today =

Song written by Murray Grand and Elisse Boyd

"Guess Who I Saw Today" is a popular jazz song written by Murray Grand with lyrics by Elisse Boyd. The song was originally composed for Leonard Sillman's Broadway musical revue, New Faces of 1952, in which it was sung by June Carroll. It was later popularized by jazz vocalist Nancy Wilson.

== Notable recordings ==
- Carmen McRae – After Glow, 1957
- Eydie Gormé – Eydie Gormé, 1957
- Carol Sloane – Early Hours, 1959
- Nancy Wilson – Something Wonderful, 1960
- Maynard Ferguson and Chris Connor - Two's Company, 1961
- Julie London – Love On the Rocks, 1963
- Eartha Kitt – Love for Sale 1965
- Elsie Bianchi Brunner - "The Sweetest Sound" 1965
- Georgie Fame – Georgie Does His Thing With Strings, 1969
- Laura Lee – Two Sides of Laura Lee, 1972
- Kimiko Kasai – In Person, 1973
- Toni Tennille – More Than You Know, 1984
- Renée Geyer – Sing to Me, 1985
- Eartha Kitt – Live in London, 1990
- Laura Fygi - Introducing, 1991
- Gwen Guthrie - Guess Who I Saw Today, 1994
- Janis Siegel – I Wish You Love, 2002
- Ranee Lee – Just You, Just Me, 2005
- Miki Howard – Private Collection, 2008
- Chanté Moore – Love the Woman, 2008
- Samara Joy – Linger Awhile, 2022
