= Elisse Boyd =

Composer

Elisse Boyd (born Agnes Elisse Corbett) (1910–1979) was a composer. She married William R. Boyd III and changed her name to Elisse Boyd. She had collaborated with Murray Grand and Leonard Whitcup. She had also collaborated with George Goehring with the songs "Sad but True" and "You Oughta be Ashamed".

== Early life ==
Agnes Elisse Corbett was born in 1910 in Peducah, Kentucky. Her father was Hal Corbett, who was a friend of fellow Kentuckians Alben W. Barkley (one of the vice presidents under President Truman) and humorist and columnist Irvin Cobb. Her father was claimed to have been one of the three men who were the inspiration for Irvin Cobb's composite character of Judge Priest.

== Career ==
Boyd began song writing with entering a Fort Worth, Texas contest for best theme song. She won in the competition sponsored by Casa Mañana Theater with the song "Dancing in the Moonlight", which was used for a 1937 performance at the theater. In 1944, her song "Lo! and Behold!" was first published in the United Kingdom during World War II so that she could be with her husband Colonel Boyd (his rank at that time during the war) who was stationed in Europe. The following year, the Frank Parker version of "Lo! and Behold!" was broadcast on the American Album of Familiar Music radio program. In the same year as the radio broadcast, she had announced to the print media that she was collaborating with composer Leonard Whitcup. With their collaboration, they had composed the song "Unbelievable" (1947).

=== Guess Who I Saw Today ===
With Murray Grand, she co-wrote "Guess Who I Saw Today" for the Broadway musical review New Faces of 1952, where the song was sung by June Carroll. Eartha Kitt, who was a cast member of New Face of 1952, would later sing Boyd's song "Thursday Child" in 1957. With "Guess Who I Saw Today", the song would go onto become a hit song with multiple artists singing the cover. There were musical performances of the cover by Eydie Gormé, Carmen McRae and Sarah Vaughan. Nancy Wilson had popularized what would become her signature song from her album "Something Wonderful" (1960). The first stanza of "Guess Who I Saw Today" (1952) is the following:

You're so late getting home from the office?

Did you miss your train?

Were you caught in the rain?

No, don't bother to explain.

=== Late 1950s and early 1960s ===
In 1959, her song "Mrs. Williams", a song about a lady who never wants to leave a cocktail party, was in the musical review Pieces of Eight by Julius Monk for the New York City cabaret scene at The Downstairs Club. Her song "I'd Rather Cha Cha than Eat" (co-written with Murray Grand) was in the Phyllis Diller album "Wet Toe in the Socket" (1959). The following year, her song "The Other Woman" was in Martha Wright's album "Love, Honor and All That Jazz...Songs for After the Honeymoon is Over" (1960).

== Performers of the cover songs ==
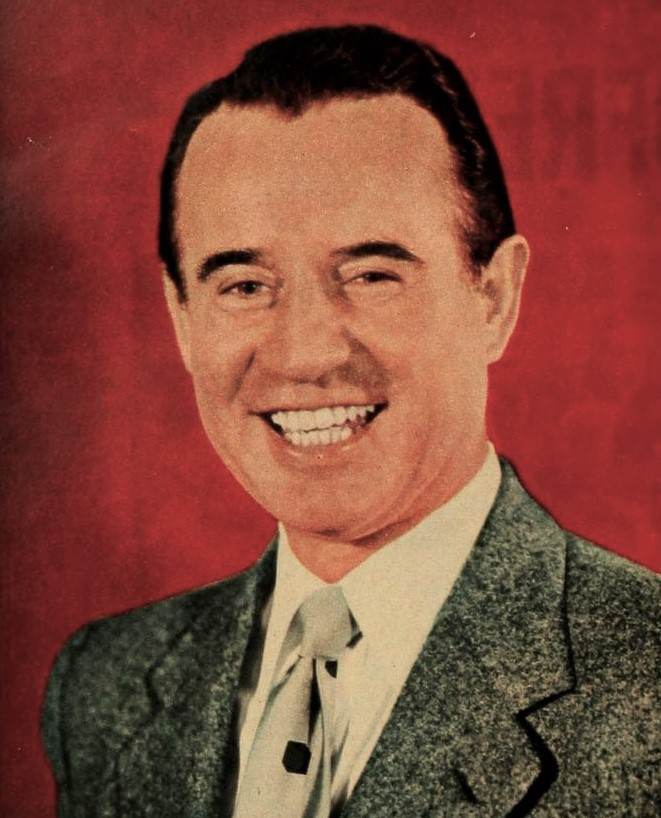
Frank Parker

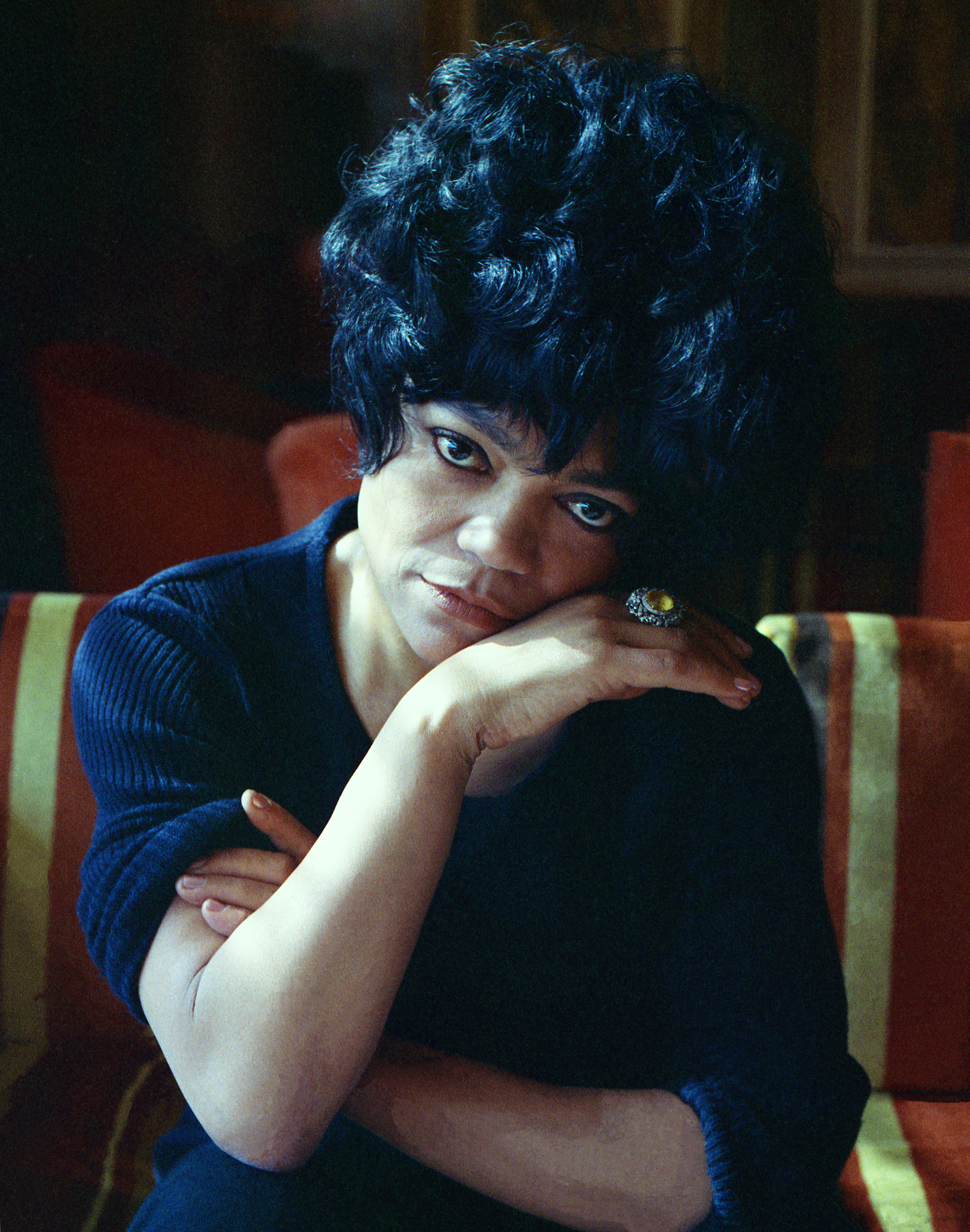
Eartha Kitt

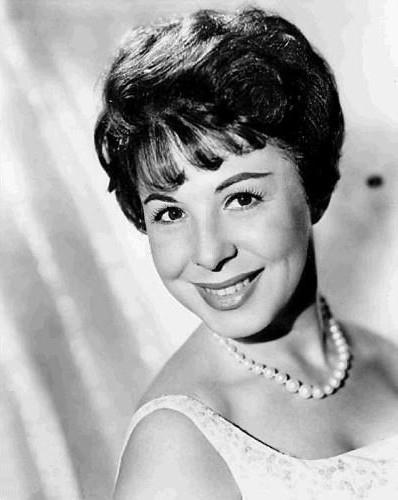
Eydie Gormé

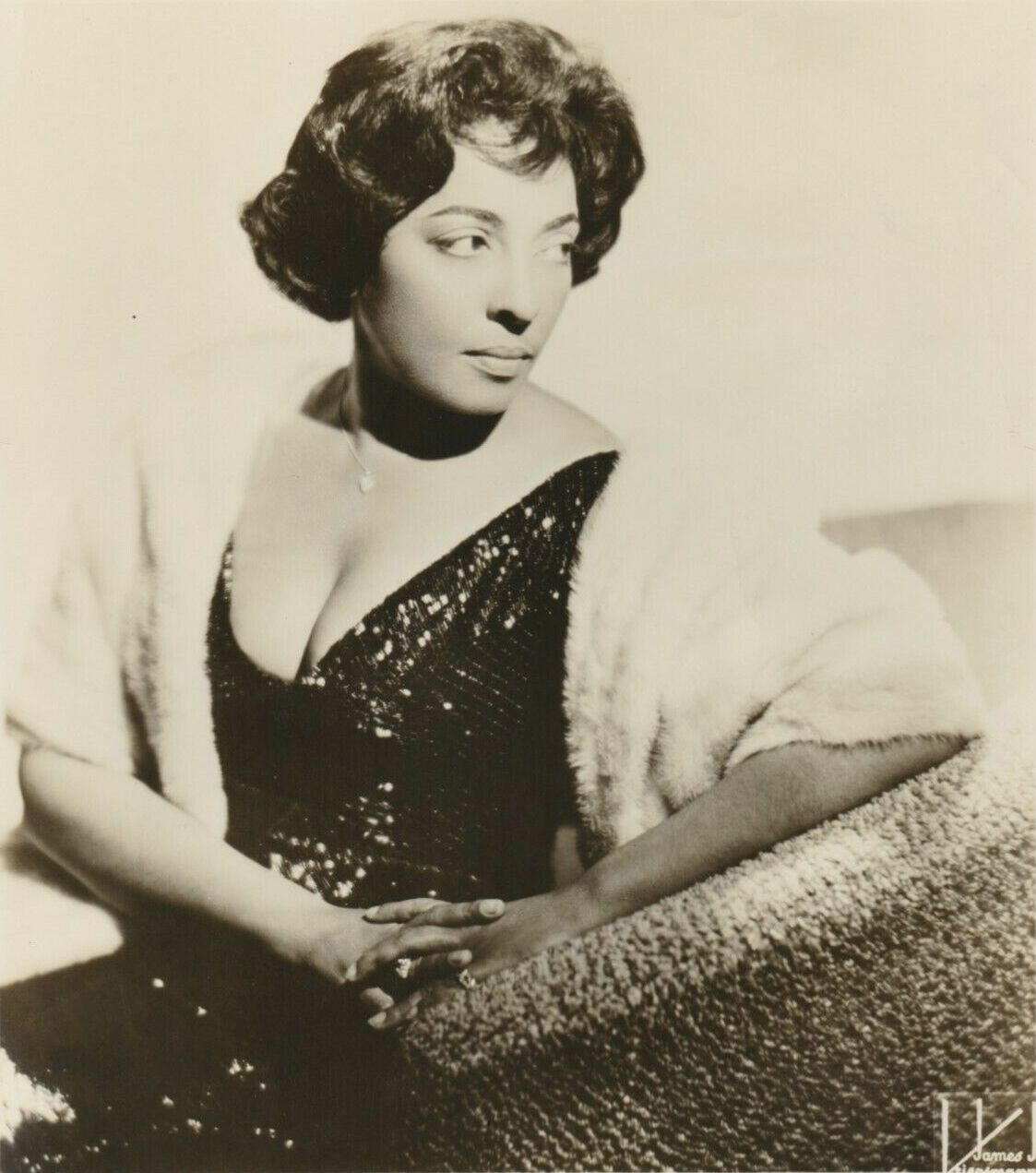
Carmen McRae

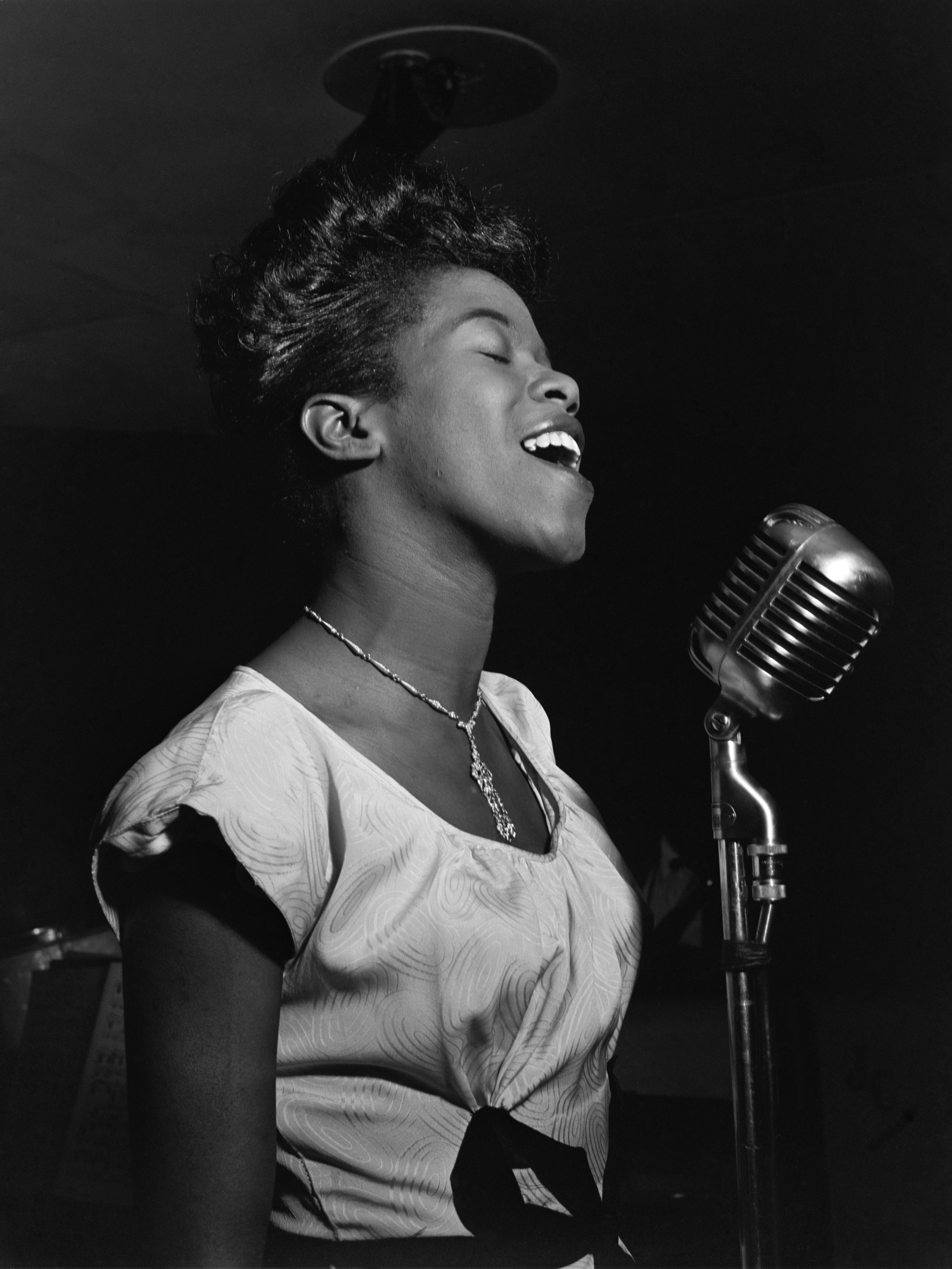
Sarah Vaughan

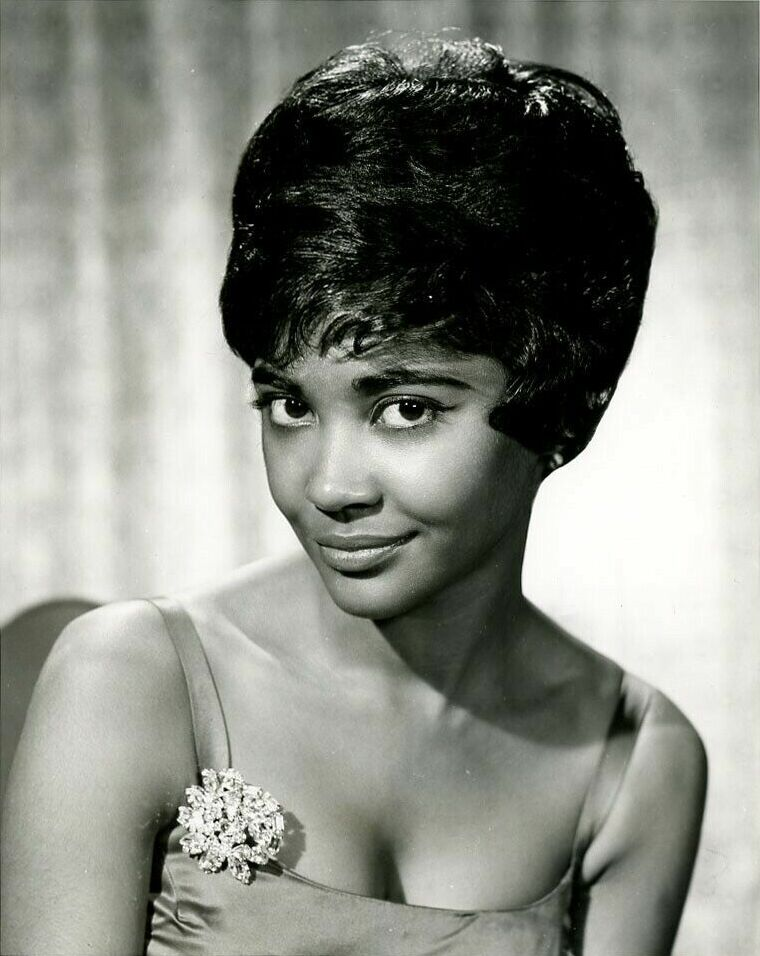
Nancy Wilson

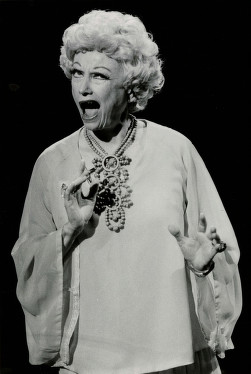
Phyllis Diller

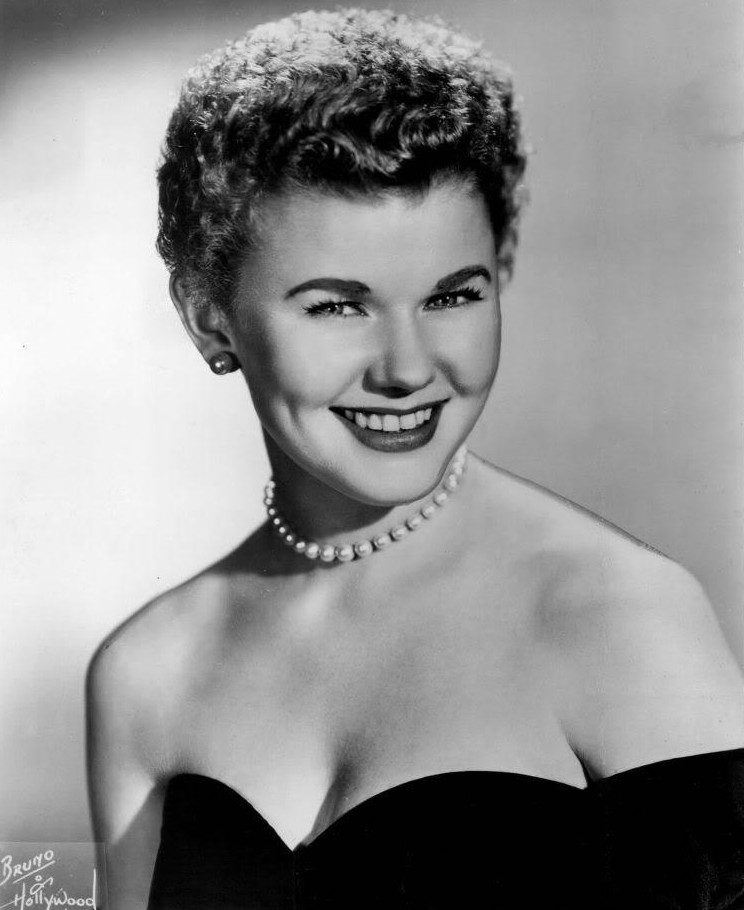
Martha Wright

== Discography ==
Music Compositions of Elisse Boyd
Title	Year	Music	Lyrics
Silly, Isn't It?	1940	As Elisse Corbett Boyd	As Elisse Corbett Boyd
I'm No Angel	1943	Elisse Boyd	Elisse Boyd
Lo! and Behold!	1944	Elisse Boyd	Elisse Boyd
Unbelievable	1947	Elisse Boyd Leonard Whitcup	Elisse Boyd Leonard Whitcup
Chic Charro	1947	Elisse Boyd Murray Grand Dale Wood	Elisse Boyd Murray Grand Dale Wood
Lil from Philadelphia	1948	Elisse Boyd Murray Grand Ken Hecht	Elisse Boyd Murray Grand Ken Hecht
A Honey of a Honey	1949	Elisse Boyd Murray Grand	Elisse Boyd Murray Grand
Lorelei	1949	George E. Cardini	Elisse Boyd
Be-Bop Blue	1949	Elisse Boyd Murray Grand	Elisse Boyd Murray Grand
Ricky Tick Song	1949	Elisse Boyd Murray Grand	Elisse Boyd Murray Grand
Guess Who I Saw Today from New Faces of 1952	1952	Elisse Boyd Murray Grand	Elisse Boyd Murray Grand
Thursday's Child	1956	Edward Cooper	Elisse Boyd
Hurry from News Faces of 1956	1956	Elisse Boyd Murray Grand	Elisse Boyd Murray Grand
I'd Rather Cha-Cha than Eat	1959	Elisse Boyd Murray Grand	Murray Grand
