= Murray Grand =

American musician (1919–2007)

- Born: Murray Grand; August 27, 1919; Philadelphia, Pennsylvania, U.S.
- Died: March 7, 2007 (aged 87) Santa Monica, California
- Occupations: Singer, songwriter, lyricist, pianist
- Instrument: Piano

Murray Grand (August 27, 1919 – March 7, 2007) was an American singer, songwriter, lyricist, and pianist best known for the song "Guess Who I Saw Today".

Born in Philadelphia, Grand played piano as a teenager. During World War II, he served as an infantryman in U.S. Army and played piano accompaniment for USO Tour stars including Gypsy Rose Lee and Betty Grable. After the war, Grand studied piano and composition at the Juilliard School and worked as a cabaret performer in New York City.

In 1952, he wrote “Guess Who I Saw Today” (with lyrics by Elisse Boyd) for the Broadway musical revue New Faces of 1952. The song has been recorded by Nancy Wilson, Carmen McRae, Sarah Vaughan, and Eydie Gorme. In 1956, he and Boyd wrote the lyrics for "Thursday Child". He had also composed songs "Hurry" (also in collaboration with Elisse Boyd), "April in Fairbanks," and "Rouge" for New Faces of 1956.

Grand's songs have been recorded by Peggy Lee, Eartha Kitt, Paula West, Blossom Dearie, Toni Tennille, Eydie Gorme, and Michael Feinstein.

Grand appeared in two Paul Mazursky films: The Tempest (1982) and Moscow on the Hudson (1984).

In his later years, Grand lived for a time in Fort Lauderdale, Florida where he ran a pet food business and continued to perform. He died of emphysema in Santa Monica, California in 2007.

== Songs ==
Songs written or co-written by Grand include:

- "Guess Who I Saw Today" (written with Elisse Boyd)
- "Casino Royale (dedicated to Ian Fleming)
- "Chicken Song" (from the musical The Chicken Inspector)
- "Gore Galore"
- "I Was Beautiful"
- "Love At An Auction"
- "Morris Was Nice"
- "Rouge"
- "The Spider And The Fly"
- "Hurry"
- "April in Fairbanks"
- "Boozers and Losers" (written with Cy Coleman)
- "Thursday's Child" (written with Elisse Boyd)
- "Too Old to Die Young"
- "I Always Say Hello to a Flower"
- "Everything You Want"
- "Come By Sunday"
- "I'd Rather Cha-Cha Than Eat"
- "Comment Allez-Vous"
- "Not a Moment Too Soon"
- "Bald"
