= Leonard Sillman =

Leonard Sillman (May 9, 1908 - January 23, 1982) was an American Broadway producer. Born in Detroit, Michigan, on May 9, 1908, he was the brother of June Carroll, the brother-in-law of Sidney Carroll and the uncle of Steve Reich and Jonathan Carroll. He produced a series of musical revues, Leonard Sillman's New Faces, which introduced many major stars to Broadway audiences, such as Henry Fonda, Eartha Kitt, Imogene Coca, Inga Swenson, John Lund, Van Johnson, Carol Lawrence, Madeline Kahn, Paul Lynde and Maggie Smith. Versions of New Faces were produced in 1934, 1936 (made into the film New Faces of 1937), 1943, 1952 (made into the film New Faces), 1956, 1962 and 1968. The very first New Faces in 1934 included actors Henry Fonda, Imogene Coca and Frances Dewey Wormser.

Songwriter Arthur Siegel, who contributed many songs to the New Faces series and radio show, described Sillman's philosophy: "He believed that a revue should be a potpourri, a bouillabaisse, in which there was something for everyone. Pace was very important. He didn't want to give an audience a chance to think about what it just saw. The music had to be nonstop." Sillman also produced many other plays from the 1930s into the late 1960s, including All in Fun (1940), Mask and Gown (1957) and the Family Way (1965). His autobiography Here Lies Leonard Sillman: Straightened Out at Last was published by the Citadel Press in 1959.

Sillman died on January 23, 1982, in New York City.
