= Dupree Bolton =

American jazz trumpeter

- Born: Dupree Ira Lewis Bolton; March 3, 1929; Oklahoma City, Oklahoma, U.S.
- Died: June 5, 1993 (aged 64) Oakland, California
- Genres: Jazz
- Occupation: Musician
- Instrument: Trumpet
- Years active: 1944–1963

Dupree Bolton (3 March 1929 – 5 June 1993) was a jazz trumpeter from Oklahoma City, Oklahoma. He is known primarily for his appearance as a backing musician on two hard bop jazz albums, the first led by Harold Land in 1959, and the second led by Curtis Amy in 1963. Bolton spent most of his adult life incarcerated for non-violent crimes related to his drug addiction, and he was considered a mysterious figure by jazz musicians and writers during his lifetime because of the lack of available information about him. He played with relatively few jazz musicians during his musical prime, mainly in the Los Angeles area and inside U.S. prisons including San Quentin and Soledad. Biographical information on Bolton began to emerge following his death, most notably in the work of jazz historian Ted Gioia, who was able to find and interview Bolton four years before Bolton's death in 1993.

== Childhood ==
Dupree Bolton was born in Oklahoma City, Oklahoma on 3 March 1929 as the eldest of his parents' four children. His father was a part-time professional violinist who also played other stringed instruments. Bolton started playing violin at age 5 at the behest of his father, but he soon moved to the trumpet and progressed quickly on the instrument. In 1941, Bolton's family moved to Southern California so that Bolton's father could work in the defense industry, which was expanding because of World War II. Bolton was not the only child in the family to pursue music professionally. As an adult, one of Bolton's two younger brothers, Dodge Bolton, played jazz piano professionally in the Seattle, Washington area and elsewhere.

== Early professional experience in big bands ==
In 1944, Bolton left home at age 14 against his parents wishes to join Jay McShann's band. This was during a period when many musicians had been drafted into U.S. military service for World War II, and underaged musicians were sometimes hired to complete band rosters. Bolton was an advanced musician for his age, and was given solo features by McShann. (Bolton joined McShann two years after saxophonist Charlie Parker had left the band, and the two musicians did not play together with McShann.) In 1989, Bolton described how he ran away with McShann's band:

I told my mother I wanted to go on the road with that band and she said 'You're not going anywhere with any band. You're going to stay here and go to school.' So I went downtown to Main Street in Los Angeles and bought myself a suitcase and took it over to the hotel where the McShann musicians were staying. Over the next few weeks I'd sneak out my clothes, a pair of pants at a time, a shirt at a time. When I was done, I ran off with the band.

Off the bandstand, he was soon introduced to drug use by members of the McShann band, who sent him to drugstores with forged prescriptions, and introduced him to using and selling narcotics. Bolton's brief stint with Jay McShann ended when McShann was taken into custody by the army as a draftee. The band members, including Bolton, were stranded away from home with no source of income.

Bolton went to New York City after the McShann band broke up. In New York, he was hired to play with the Buddy Johnson Orchestra, with whom he recorded two songs (“That’s the Stuff you Gotta Watch” and “One of Them Good Ones”, Decca 8671). Bolton used the name “Lewis Dupree” for the recording date, as his parents were actively looking for him and put ads in a newspaper offering a $25 reward for information about their son. In 1975, an LP featuring live recordings of the Johnson band was released (Buddy Johnson At The Savoy Ballroom 1945-1946, Jazz Archives JA-25), and Bolton can be heard as a 16-year-old soloing on a riff tune entitled "Traffic Jam".

Bolton left the Johnson band between December 1945 and January 1946 to join the trumpet section of the Benny Carter band. He made some studio recordings as a member of Carter's trumpet section, but he was not a featured soloist.

== Periods of incarceration ==
In 1947, one day before his 17th birthday, Bolton was arrested for marijuana possession during a search of his hotel room conducted by police officers who were investigating Bolton and a bandmate with whom he shared the room. Bolton was sent to Federal Medical Center in Lexington, Kentucky, which was operating as a combination of drug treatment center and prison, with some patients living at the institution voluntarily, and others, like Bolton, confined involuntarily because of federal drug convictions. Because he was still a minor, he was sentenced to serve a term that lasted until his 21st birthday.

Upon his release in 1950, he lived in Watts, Los Angeles with his family and played music professionally but sporadically for more than a year. He still struggled with heroin addiction, and was arrested again in 1951 and sent to Soledad state prison. This was the beginning of a pattern in Bolton's life that was to last for another 30 years, where Bolton was repeatedly convicted and sentenced to prison for forgery offenses (both financial forgery and drug prescription forgery) and drug possession. Another arrest during a brief period outside prison in 1956 led to a third sentence, this time at the Terminal Island federal prison. In 1959, Bolton was released and was able to briefly resume his music career in Los Angeles. However, this period was cut short after he was again arrested, convicted, and sent to San Quentin State Prison.

While in San Quentin, during the period from March 1961 to October 1962, Bolton and Art Pepper were serving time concurrently, and were able to play music together in a prison band. The band also included pianist Jimmy Bunn, who had recorded for Dial Records on sessions led by Charlie Parker in the mid-1940s. According to alto saxophonist Frank Morgan, who went to San Quentin in 1962 to serve a sentence related to drug charges, Morgan and drummer Frank Butler also played jazz bands inside San Quentin that included Bolton and Pepper. Morgan told JazzTimes journalist Larry Appelbaum in 2005 that "Art and I played more when we were in San Quentin together than when we were on the outside. We had a great band there with Frank Butler, Dupree Bolton, Nathaniel Meeks, and some guys who learned how to play while they were in prison."

In his January 1989 interview with Ted Gioia, Bolton said that he felt that prison likely kept him from an early death related to heroin addiction. Heroin had contributed to the death of Bolton's musical hero Fats Navarro, and to the early deaths of hard bop musicians including the pianist Carl Perkins, Sonny Clark, and Ernie Henry in the 1950s and 1960s. In that same interview, Bolton said he was able to make musical progress while incarcerated, and described his practice routine while serving the 4-year prison sentence at Soledad that began in 1951:

I got a [prison] job that didn't restrict me and I was able to practice every day. I would play tunes, but my main objective was to get down with the mechanics of the instrument. That meant scales and exercises. I would play them sometimes for 12 to 14 hours a day.

== 1959-1963: The Fox, and Katanga! ==
In 1959, Bolton was released from the Terminal Island prison and was able to play live in jazz clubs in the Los Angeles area after being mostly off the scene for 12 years. He quickly gained a reputation as a major talent among local jazz musicians, most of whom had not seen him during his earlier periods of professional musical activity. Saxophonist Harold Land and pianist Elmo Hope heard about Bolton from drummer Frank Butler, who was friendly with Bolton. Land and Hope had worked together with Butler in the Curtis Counce group, and Land was looking for musicians for an upcoming record date to be led by Land. Land, who had never heard of Bolton prior to 1959, saw the trumpeter live and hired him to play on the sessions for his second LP, which became The Fox.

After the release of The Fox, there was a curiosity on the part of jazz musicians, historians and fans about the lack of biographical information available on Bolton. This lack of information lasted for decades. The Fox, while never a big seller, found favor among fans and critics, and was reissued many times in LP and CD editions in the United States, Europe, and Japan. To jazz listeners that found The Fox, Bolton seemed to have appeared out of nowhere in 1959 with a fully mature and technically advanced style. Apart from Bolton's one reappearance in 1963 on another jazz recording, again working as a backing musician, he seemed to completely vanish. It was not generally known whether Bolton was still alive for most of the 1970s and 1980s. When mentioned at all in the jazz press, Bolton was usually described as "mysterious" or "little-known."

Bolton told Gioia in an initially unpublished 1989 interview that on the few occasions in the past when he was asked by journalists or researchers about his life story, he was reluctant to give details:

I didn't want to talk about myself because of my background—-prison, using dope and the rest of it. Whereas now, it helps. It's kind of like coming out of the closet. But not back thirty years ago.

Gioia eventually published, in 2009, a full article based on his 1989 interview with Bolton, but some factual details of Bolton's life started to emerge in books and articles in the 1990s and early 2000s. Gioia's own book West Coast Jazz (University of California, 1998) provided some of the story, and in 2001, a feature story on Bolton by Richard Williams appeared in Granta 69.

Shortly after The Fox was recorded, Bolton was again arrested and convicted, and he began serving the sentence in San Quentin State Prison described above.

Bolton's last professional recordings were in 1963, and most notable was his featured role on the Katanga! LP by Curtis Amy. Bolton also recorded two pieces in 1963 for a Pacific Jazz session led by alto sax player Earl Anderza, who Bolton had met in San Quentin. (These were released on the 2009 compilation CD Fireball under Bolton's name.) Bolton, a skilled music reader, was also hired in 1963 for a studio session led by arranger and band leader Gerald Wilson, and hired for another session the same year backing Lou Rawls as part of a band organized by Curtis Amy.

== Musical style ==
Bolton was a technically gifted player in the bebop idiom. Bolton told Ted Gioia that one of his biggest musical inspirations was Fats Navarro, who he was able to see live when he lived in New York City in the mid-1940s. Jazz writers have also compared Bolton's playing to Dizzy Gillespie, and Clifford Brown. Bolton's tone was large and his playing was firmly in the extroverted tradition of bebop and hard bop.

Bolton was adept at fast tempos, which were favored by bebop pioneers like Navarro, Charlie Parker, and Max Roach. Ted Gioia wrote of Bolton's performance on the composition "The Fox":

The tempo pushes a ridiculous 400 beats per minute, roughly the rhythm of a machine gun shooting off its bullets, rat-a-tat-a-tat-a-tat. Bolton leaps out of the starting gate like a man shot out of a cannon, and never looks back. He thrives on the near frenzy of the proceedings—indeed, it would be hard to find another trumpet solo that surpasses this one for sheer intensity. The other performances on the album confirmed that Land's sideman was something special.

Bolton could also play with restraint on ballads like Hope's "Mirror Mind Rose", which appeared on The Fox, and "You Don't Know What Love Is", from Katanga!. Writers have noted that Bolton's art continued to evolve in the 1950s and early 1960s, even when he was incarcerated. For example, by 1963, Bolton sounded comfortable playing the modal jazz of Katanga!'s “Native Land”, a style that caught on widely among hard bop musicians in the early 1960s, when Bolton was serving a prison sentence in San Quentin.

== Later life and death ==
Bolton, who returned to prison in 1963, again for forgery and drug-related crimes, spent most of the next 20 years serving prison sentences. One brief period in 1967 when he was out of prison led to work with Bobby Hutcherson, but no recordings are known to exist of Hutcherson's band with Bolton. During 1980, while serving a prison sentence in Oklahoma, Bolton was recorded with a small prison band made up of semi-professional and amateur musicians, and these recordings were released as one section of the Fireball compilation CD in 2009 (the CD also has performances of Bolton playing live with Curtis Amy in 1962 and 1963). Talking of the 1980 prison recordings, he said "The people on the record were not musicians. They were just people doing time. I did it because it was something to do."

After his final release from an Oklahoma prison in 1983, Bolton spent some months on parole in Oklahoma City, where he reportedly sat in with saxophonist Dexter Gordon when Gordon was in town for a concert, then moved to Oakland, California and lived in obscurity. He enrolled in a government supervised methadone treatment program to control his drug addiction. For income, he sometimes played his trumpet on the street in San Francisco's Chinatown neighborhood for tips.

Ted Gioia, who found and interviewed Bolton in January 1989, recorded Bolton in a Menlo Park, Calf. recording studio shortly after conducting his interview, but explained in 2009 why the recordings were never released:

I accompanied him on piano while he played trumpet. His approach was tentative as he felt his way around the new horn he had borrowed for the occasion. The fire-breathing intensity of his early recordings was apparently gone for good. On fast numbers, only an occasional phrase reminded the listener of the prepossessing trumpeter of the early 1960s. When we played ballads, he revealed a more delicate approach than I recalled from his earlier recordings, relying on filigreed improvised lines that sought for beauty rather than passion. "Yes, man, I can still play. I can still play," Bolton asserted. But the recordings, alas, would not live up to the inevitable comparisons with the work he had done in his youth. I held on to the tapes from this session for some months. But then I did what struck me as the only honorable thing. I destroyed them. Dupree Bolton should be remembered, I felt, for the greatness of his youthful achievements, not the limitations of his later efforts.

Bolton died from cardiac arrest in 1993, according to his Alameda County death certificate. The certificate, found years later by researcher Richard Williams, was filed erroneously under the name "Dupree Bolten".

== Discography ==
- 1959: The Fox (HiFiJazz, later Contemporary) with Harold Land
- 1963: Katanga! (Pacific Jazz) with Curtis Amy and guitarist Ray Crawford, pianist Jack Wilson, double bassist Victor Gaskin, and drummer Doug Sides
- 2009: Fireball (Uptown Records, recorded 1963 and 1980)
