= Funktion Junction =

Album by Blue Mitchell

Studio album by Blue Mitchell
- Released: 1976
- Recorded: 1976
- Studio: RCA's Studio A, Hollywood, California
- Genre: Jazz
- Label: RCA
- Producer: Mike Lipskin

Blue Mitchell chronology
Stratosonic Nuances (1975)	Funktion Junction (1976)	African Violet (1977)

Professional ratings
Review scores
Source	Rating
Allmusic	1/5 stars

Funktion Junction is a 1976 album by American trumpeter Blue Mitchell. It was his last album released by RCA Records.

== Track listing ==
1. "I'm In Heaven" (Mervin Steals) 5:37
2. "AM-FM Blues" (Blue Mitchell) 4:21
3. "Then Came You" (Phillip Pugh, Sherman Marshall) 4:52
4. "Daydream" (Billy Strayhorn, Duke Ellington, John LaTouche) 4:45
5. "Love Machine" (Billy Griffin, Pete Moore) 7:19
6. "Delilah" (Victor Young) 8:11
7. "Collaborations" (Blue Mitchell) 5:15

== Personnel ==
- Blue Mitchell – trumpet, flugelhorn
- James Gadson – drums
- Henry Davis, Ron Brown – electric bass
- David T. Walker, Michael Anthony – electric guitar
- Mike Lipskin – synthesizer, percussion
- Clarence McDonald – piano
- Gary Coleman – percussion
- Harold Land – tenor saxophone
- Wayne Andre, Alan Raph – trombone
- David Moore – cello
- George Young – tenor saxophone, flute
- John Gatchell, Jon Faddis – trumpet, flugelhorn
- Alvin Rogers, Harold Kohon, Norman Carr – violin
- Frank Floyd, Gwendolyn Guthrie, Patti Austin – backing vocals

== Charts ==
Chart (1976)	Peak position
Billboard Top Jazz Albums	31
