= Rolf Ericson =

Swedish jazz trumpeter (1922–1997)

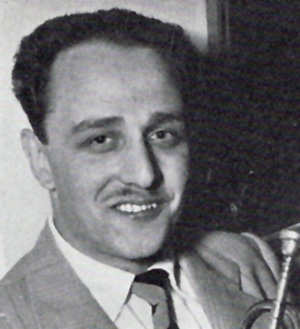
- Ericson in 1955

Background information
- Born: Rolf Nils Börje Ericson; 29 August 1922; Stockholm, Sweden
- Died: 16 June 1997 (aged 74)
- Genre: Jazz
- Occupation: Musician
- Instruments: Trumpet; flugelhorn
- Years active: 1949–1990s
- Labels: Metronome; Dragon; Gazell; Four Leaf Clover; Interplay; Amigo
- Formerly of: Charlie Barnet; Woody Herman; Leonard Feather; Charlie Spivak; Harry James; the Dorsey Brothers; Les Brown; Lighthouse All-Stars; Duke Ellington; Rod Levitt; Al Porcino

Rolf Ericson (29 August 1922 – 16 June 1997) was a Swedish jazz trumpeter. He also played the flugelhorn.

== Early career ==
Ericson was born in Stockholm, Sweden. He moved to New York City in 1947 and, in 1949, joined Charlie Barnet's big band and then with Woody Herman in 1950. Later, he worked with Paul Gonsalves, Charlie Parker, and Charles Mingus.

Returning to Sweden in 1950, he recorded as a leader and with Arne Domnérus, as well as for Leonard Feather's Swinging Swedes and Lars Gullin. He returned to the U.S. in 1953–1956 and played with the big bands of Charlie Spivak, Harry James, the Dorsey Brothers, and Les Brown, and was with the Lighthouse All-Stars. In 1956, he toured Sweden and played with Ernestine Anderson and Lars Gullin.

== Later career ==
From 1956 to 1965, Ericson was back in the U.S., working with Dexter Gordon, Harold Land, Stan Kenton, Woody Herman, Maynard Ferguson, Buddy Rich, Benny Goodman, Gerry Mulligan, Dan Terry, Max Roach and Charles Mingus, among others. He was with the Duke Ellington orchestra from 1963 until 1971. In the early 1960s, he made three recordings as a member of the Rod Levitt orchestra (octet). Ericson played with the Al Porcino Big Band in Berlin in the late 1970s and early 1980s.

== Discography ==
=== As leader or co-leader ===
- 1956.08: Rolf Ericson & the American Stars (EmArcy, 1958) – recordings originally issued by Metronome in Sweden; reissued on CD by Fresh Sound
- 1956.06: Rolf Ericson & the American Stars 1956 with Ernestine Anderson (Dragon, 1995) – sessions also issued on CD by Fresh Sound
- 1972: Oh Pretty Little Neida (Gazell)
- 1975: Don't Get Around Much Anymore – Live at Bullerbyn (Polydor/Grammofonverket)
- 1978: Sincerely Ours (Four Leaf Clover) – co-led with Johnny Griffin
- 1985: Stockholm Sweetnin' (Dragon)
- 1989: My Foolish Heart (Interplay) – with Lex Jasper
- 1997: I Love You So... (Amigo)
- 1998: Beautiful Love (Four Leaf Clover) – with the Metropole Orkest, recorded in Hilversum, Netherlands, 1980–1989

=== As sideman ===
With Jan Allan

- Jan Allan '70 (MCA, 1970)

With Chet Baker

- Witch Doctor (Contemporary, 1953 [1985])

With Curtis Counce

- Exploring the Future (Dooto, 1958)

With Arne Domnérus

- Arne Domnérus and His Orchestra 1950/1951 with Rolf Ericson Featuring Lars Gullin (Dragon, 2003)
- In Concert with Bengt Hallberg & Rolf Ericson (Phontastic, 1978 [1984])

With Kenny Dorham

- Scandia Skies (SteepleChase, 1963 [1980])

With Duke Ellington

- Duke Ellington in Grona Lund 1963 (Storyville, 2014)
- Ellington at Basin Street (Music & Arts, 1964)
- Harlem (Pablo, 1964 [1985])
- Ellington '65 (Reprise, 1965)
- 70th Birthday Concert (Solid State, 1970)
- Duke Ellington in Sweden 1973 featuring Alice Babs (Caprice)

With Art Farmer

- Listen to Art Farmer and the Orchestra (Mercury, 1962)

With Maynard Ferguson

- Double Exposure (Atlantic, 1961) – with Chris Connor
- Two's Company (Roulette, 1961) – with Chris Connor
- Maynard '61 (Roulette, 1961)
- Maynard '64 (Roulette, 1958–62 [1963])

With Dexter Gordon

- After Hours (SteepleChase, c. 1969 [1986])
- After Midnight (SteepleChase, c. 1969 [1987])

With Lars Gullin

- Jazz Amour Affair (Odeon, 1971)

With Johnny Hodges

- Everybody Knows Johnny Hodges (Impulse!, 1964)

With Quincy Jones

- The Great Wide World of Quincy Jones Live! (Mercury, 1961 [1984])
- Live in Ludwigshafen 1961 (Jazzhaus, 2016)

With Stan Kenton

- Standards in Silhouette (Capitol, 1959)
- Viva Kenton! (Capitol, 1960)
- Road Show (Capitol, 1960) – with June Christy and the Four Freshmen

With Harold Land

- Harold in the Land of Jazz (Contemporary, 1958)

With Rod Levitt

- The Dynamic Sound Patterns (Riverside, 1963)
- Insight (RCA Victor, 1964)
- Solid Ground (RCA Victor, 1965)

With Charles Mingus

- The Complete Town Hall Concert (Blue Note, 1962 [1994])
- The Black Saint and the Sinner Lady (Impulse!, 1963)
- Mingus Mingus Mingus Mingus Mingus (Impulse!, 1963)

With Buddy Rich

- Blues Caravan (Verve, 1961)

With Leo Wright

- It's All Wright – Plays 12 All-Time-Hits (BASF, 1973)
