= Exploring the Future =

Studio album by The Curtis Counce Quintet
- Released: 1958
- Recorded: April 8, 1958
- Studio: Los Angeles, CA
- Genre: Jazz
- Length: 53:28 CD reissue with additional tracks
- Label: Dooto; DTL 247
- Producer: Nick Coleman

Curtis Counce chronology
Sonority (1989)	Exploring the Future (1958)

Exploring the Future is an album led by American jazz bassist Curtis Counce recorded in 1958 and released on the Dooto label.

== Reception ==
Professional ratings
Review scores
Source	Rating
Allmusic	3/5 stars
The Penguin Guide to Jazz Recordings	3.5/4 stars

The Allmusic review by Ken Dryden stated: "Although he lived for another five years after this session, this seems to be bassist Curtis Counce's last date as a leader. His quintet was in fine form playing originals by band member Elmo Hope and tenor saxophonist Harold Land, ... Swedish trumpeter Rolf Ericson, who became better known to jazz fans while with Duke Ellington in the '60s, fits in beautifully with the cool-sounding hard bop style of this tight unit".

== Track listing ==
All compositions by Elmo Hope except where noted

1. "So Nice" – 6:42
2. "Angel Eyes" (Matt Dennis, Earl Brent) – 4:03
3. "Into the Orbit" – 4:47
4. "Move" (Denzil Best) – 2:34
5. "Race for Space" – 4:36
6. "Someone to Watch Over Me" (George Gershwin, Ira Gershwin) – 3:45
7. "Exploring the Future" (Harold Land) – 6:18
8. "The Countdown" – 4:05
9. "Foreplay" (Duke Jordan) – 6:40 Additional track on CD release
10. "Move" [unedited take] (Best) – 4:21
11. "The Countdown" [unedited take] – 5:37

== Personnel ==
- Curtis Counce - bass
- Rolf Ericson - trumpet
- Harold Land - tenor saxophone
- Elmo Hope - piano
- Frank Butler - drums
