= Merry Olde Soul =

Studio album by Victor Feldman
- Released: 1961
- Recorded: 16 December 1960 and 6 & 11 January 1961
- Studio: Plaza Sound Studios, NYC
- Genre: Jazz
- Length: 40:25
- Label: RiversideRLP/S9 366
- Producer: Orrin Keepnews

Victor Feldman chronology
Latinsville! (1959)	Merry Olde Soul (1961)	Stop the World I Want to Get Off (1962)

Merry Olde Soul is an album by vibraphonist/pianist Victor Feldman recorded in early 1961 (with one track from December 1960) and originally released on the Riverside label.

== Reception ==
Professional ratings
Review scores
Source	Rating
AllMusic	3/5 stars
DownBeat	4/5 stars
The Penguin Guide to Jazz Recordings	3/4 stars

The contemporaneous DownBeat reviewer picked "Serenity" – "a beautiful and touching work" – as the highlight, and praised the contributions of all the musicians. The AllMusic review by Scott Yanow states: "Feldman is in excellent form on a straight-ahead set. The trio/quartet performs five standards that for the most part are not overly familiar, plus four of the leader's originals. Tasteful and swinging music". On All About Jazz Samuel Chell observed "As impressive as is his earlier date, The Arrival of Victor Feldman, Merry Olde Soul is overall a more satisfying session ... Merry Olde Soul exhibits more warmth and variety in its textures. It's also a more "groove-oriented session" thanks to the use of Cannonball Adderley's rhythm team".

== Track listing ==
All compositions by Victor Feldman except where noted.

1. "For Dancers Only" (Sy Oliver, Don Raye, Vic Schoen) – 4:43
2. "Lisa" (Victor Feldman, Torrie Zito) – 4:05
3. "Serenity" – 4:38
4. "You Make Me Feel So Young" (Josef Myrow, Mack Gordon) – 5:18
5. "Come Sunday" (Duke Ellington) – 2:17
6. "The Man I Love" (George Gershwin, Ira Gershwin) – 6:27
7. "Bloke's Blues" – 5:34
8. "I Want to Be Wanted" (Kim Gannon, Pino Spotti, Alberto Testa) – 3:44
9. "Mosey on Down" – 3:58
- Recorded at Plaza Sound Studios, NYC on 16 December 1960 (track 4) and 6 & 11 January 1961 (tracks 1–3 & 5–9)

== Personnel ==
- Victor Feldman – vibraphone (tracks 2, 5, 6 & 9), piano (tracks 1, 3, 4, 7 & 8)
- Hank Jones – piano (tracks 2, 5 & 9)
- Sam Jones (tracks 1–3, 5–9), Andy Simpkins (track 4) – bass
- Louis Hayes – drums
