= Lazy Afternoon =

Lazy Afternoon may refer to:

- "Lazy Afternoon", a song written by Jerome Moross and John La Touche for the 1954 musical The Golden Apple; covered on most of the albums below
- Lazy Afternoon (Barbra Streisand album), 1975
- Lazy Afternoon (Regina Belle album), 2004
- A Lazy Afternoon (Harold Land album), 1995
- A Lazy Afternoon (Shirley Horn album), 1979
- Lazy Afternoon, an album by Jason Wilber, 2006
