= Wheelin' and Dealin' =

Wheelin' and Dealin' or Wheelin' & Dealin' may refer to:

- Wheelin' & Dealin' (Prestige Records album), a 1958 album by John Coltrane and Frank Wess
- Wheelin' and Dealin' (Asleep at the Wheel album), a 1976 country album
- Wheelin' and Dealin' (Frank Butler album), a 1978 album by drummer Frank Butler
- "Wheelin' and Dealin'" (Happy Tree Friends), a 2000 episode of the animated flash series

== See also ==
- "Wheeling and Dealing", an episode from American season 1 of The Apprentice
