= A New Shade of Blue =

Studio album by Harold Land
- Released: 1971
- Recorded: 1971; Los Angeles, CA
- Genre: Jazz
- Length: 43:38
- Label: Mainstream; MRL 314
- Producer: Bob Shad

Harold Land chronology
San Francisco (1971)	A New Shade of Blue (1971)	Choma (Burn) (1971)

A New Shade of Blue is an album recorded by American saxophonist Harold Land in 1971 for the Mainstream label.

== Reception ==
Professional ratings
Review scores
Source	Rating
AllMusic	3/5 stars
The Virgin Encyclopedia of Jazz	3/5 stars

AllMusic awarded the album 3 stars.

A reviewer of Dusty Groove stated "An overlooked chapter in the Harold Land/Bobby Hutcherson partnership that recorded more famously for Blue Note – a date that's issued here under the tenorist's own name, but which also features equal contributions from Hutcherson on vibes! Tracks have that long, modal quality that has the pair almost birthing a whole new generation in jazz expression – a style that's more sophisticated than earlier soul jazz, yet equally soulful in its own sort of way – aware of all the freedoms of the avant scene, yet never fully indulgent of them – and always guided by a spirit set loose by Coltrane, but in ways that are very different than so many others in the post-Coltrane generation!"

== Track listing ==
All compositions by Harold Land except as indicated

1. "A New Shade of Blue" – 9:48
2. "Mtume" (Bobby Hutcherson) – 10:12
3. "Ode to Angela" – 6:12
4. "De-Liberation" – 8:39
5. "Short Subject" – 8:47

Note: "Dark Mood," originally issued on a "various artists" sampler, is included as a bonus track on the streaming version of this album. It was also included as a CD bonus track on the 1991 issue of Damisi.

== Personnel ==
- Harold Land – tenor saxophone
- Bobby Hutcherson – vibraphone
- William Henderson – piano, electric piano
- Buster Williams – bass
- Billy Hart – drums
- James Mtume Foreman – congas
