= Stratosonic Nuances =

Studio album by Blue Mitchell
- Released: 1975
- Recorded: 1975
- Studio: RCA Studio A, Hollywood, CA
- Genre: Jazz
- Length: 39:45
- Label: RCA; APL1-1109
- Producer: Mike Lipskin

Blue Mitchell chronology
Many Shades of Blue (1974)	Stratosonic Nuances (1975)	Funktion Junction (1976)

Stratosonic Nuances is an album by American trumpeter Blue Mitchell released on the RCA label in 1975.

== Reception ==
The Allmusic review awarded the album 2 stars stating "one might have expected great things. Unfortunately, the music is quite commercial (obviously recorded with potential record sales in mind) and is sunk by dull and instantly dated arrangements".

Professional ratings
Review scores
Source	Rating
Allmusic	2/5 stars

== Track listing ==
1. "Satin Soul" (Barry White) - 7:20
2. "Creepin'" (Stevie Wonder) - 12:01
3. "Bump It" (Blue Mitchell) - 4:53
4. "Nutty" (Thelonious Monk) - 8:56
5. "Melody for Thelma" (Mitchell) - 6:55

== Personnel ==
- Blue Mitchell - trumpet, flugelhorn
- Ralph Jones - flute, tenor saxophone
- Harold Land - tenor saxophone
- Terry Harrington - baritone saxophone
- Oscar Brashear - trumpet
- Gale Robinson - French horn
- George Bohanon - trombone
- Mike Anthony, David T. Walker - guitar
- Hampton Hawes - electric piano
- Clarence McDonald - electric piano, clavinet, synthesizer, arranger
- Cedar Walton - electric piano, synthesizer
- Tony Newton - electric bass
- James Gadson - drums
- Gary Coleman - percussion
- Wade Marcus - arranger and conductor
- Mike Lipskin - arranger
