= For Real! (Hampton Hawes album) =

Album by Hampton Hawes

Studio album by Hampton Hawes
- Released: August 1961
- Recorded: March 17, 1958
- Studio: Contemporary Records Studio, Los Angeles
- Genre: Jazz
- Length: 39:19
- Label: Contemporary; M 3589/S 7589
- Producer: Lester Koenig

Hampton Hawes chronology
Four! (1958)	For Real! (1961)	Bird Song (1956-58)

For Real! is an album by American jazz pianist Hampton Hawes recorded in 1958 but not released on the Contemporary label until 1961.

== Reception ==
The Allmusic review by Scott Yanow states "pianist Hawes sounds inspired by the other players and is in top form throughout the generally memorable outing".

Professional ratings
Review scores
Source	Rating
Allmusic	4/5 stars
The Rolling Stone Jazz Record Guide	4/5 stars
The Penguin Guide to Jazz Recordings	4/4 stars

== Track listing ==
1. "Hip" (Hampton Hawes) - 6:14
2. "Wrap Your Troubles in Dreams" (Harry Barris, Ted Koehler, Billy Moll) - 9:20
3. "Crazeology" (Benny Harris) - 6:40
4. "Numbers Game" (Hawes, Harold Land) - 8:04
5. "For Real" (Hawes, Land) - 11:21
6. "I Love You" (Cole Porter) - 3:56

== Personnel ==
- Hampton Hawes - piano
- Harold Land - tenor saxophone
- Scott LaFaro - bass
- Frank Butler - drums
