= Xocia's Dance =

Studio album by Harold Land
- Released: 1981
- Recorded: October 22, 1981
- Studio: Sage & Sound Recording, Hollywood, CA
- Genre: Jazz
- Length: 56:40
- Label: Muse Records; MR 5272
- Producer: Esmond Edwards

Harold Land chronology
Mapenzi (1977)	Xocia's Dance (1981)	A Lazy Afternoon (1995)

Xocia's Dance is the thirteenth studio album by American hard bop tenor saxophonist Harold Land as band leader. The album was released in 1981 via Muse Records label and re-released on CD in 1990.

== Reception ==
Professional ratings
Review scores
Source	Rating
AllMusic	4/5 stars
Tom Hull	B+
The Rolling Stone Jazz Record Guide	4/5 stars
The Virgin Encyclopedia of Jazz	3/5 stars

Stephen Cook of AllMusic wrote: "Maybe best known for his 1959 Contemporary album The Fox, tenor saxophonist Harold Land spent the '50s and '60s rebuking the stereotype of the West Coast sound being all wafer-thin with his robust and intense work as both a solo artist and sideman. And while he slowed down a bit in the '70s, Land came roaring back with this exceptional effort from 1981. Both the playing and the songs are all top notch. To help out, Land enlists the fine talents of drummer Billy Higgins, vibraphonist Bobby Hutcherson, pianist George Cables, trumpeter Oscar Brashear, and bassist John Heard. Highly recommended."

== Track listing ==
No.	Title	Writer(s)	Length
1.	"Dark Mood"	Land	8:15
2.	"Daisy Forever"	Oscar Brashear	9:18
3.	"Xocia's Dance (Sue-sha's Dance)"	Land	4:48
4.	"Ah, I See"	Charles Tolliver	9:51
5.	"To Lydia with Love"	Land	12:10
6.	"Blues for You"	Land	4:53
7.	"Dark Mood (alt.)"	Land	7:25
Total length:			56:40

== Personnel ==
- Harold Land – saxophone
- Oscar Brashear – trumpet
- George Cables – piano
- Billy Higgins – drums
- Bobby Hutcherson – vibes (tracks 2 4 5)
- John Heard – bass
- Ray Armando – percussion
