= Sonority (album) =

Studio album by Curtis Counce
- Released: 1989
- Recorded: October 15, 1956, April 22 & August 29, 1957 and January 6, 1958; Contemporary Studios in Los Angeles, California
- Genre: Jazz
- Length: 50:27
- Label: Contemporary C7655
- Producer: Lester Koenig

Curtis Counce chronology
Carl's Blues (1957-58)	Sonority (1989)	Exploring the Future (1958)

Sonority is an album by American jazz bassist Curtis Counce featuring recordings from 1956 to 1958 which was released on the Contemporary label in 1989.

== Reception ==
The Allmusic review by Scott Yanow states "The playing is quite rewarding, and all four of the Counce reissues are easily recommended to hard bop collectors".

Professional ratings
Review scores
Source	Rating
Allmusic	3/5 stars
The Penguin Guide to Jazz Recordings	3/4 stars

== Track listing ==
All compositions by Elmo Hope except as indicated

1. "Woody 'n' You" (Dizzy Gillespie) - 6:23
2. "How Long Has This Been Going On?" (George Gershwin, Ira Gershwin) - 3:20
3. "Landslide" [alternate take] (Harold Land) - 9:03
4. "Sonor" [alternate take] (Kenny Clarke, Gerald Wiggins) - 5:18
5. "So Nice" - 5:25
6. "Origin" - 4:43
7. "Bella Rosa" - 6:11
8. "A Night in Tunisia" (Gillespie, Frank Paparelli) - 8:20
9. "A Drum Conversation" (Frank Butler) - 2:22 Bonus track on CD reissue
- Recorded at Contemporary Studios in Los Angeles, CA on October 15, 1956 (tracks 1, 3 & 4), April 22, 1957 (track 9), August 29, 1957 (track 2) and January 6, 1958 (tracks 5–9)

== Personnel ==
- Curtis Counce - bass
- Jack Sheldon (tracks 1–4 & 9), Gerald Wilson (tracks 5–8) - trumpet
- Harold Land - tenor saxophone
- Elmo Hope (tracks 5–7), Carl Perkins (tracks 1–4, 8 & 9) - piano
- Frank Butler - drums
