= Harold Land =

American jazz saxophonist (1928–2001)

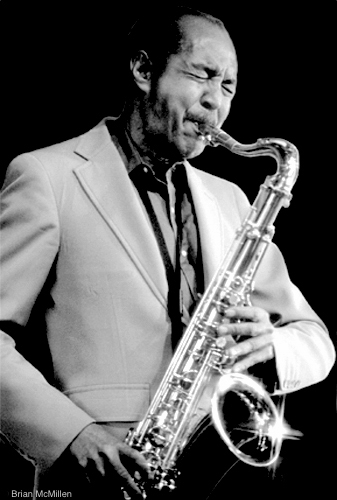
- Harold Land at Bach Dancing & Dynamite Society, Half Moon Bay CA 1982

Background information
- Born: December 18, 1928; Houston, Texas, U.S.
- Died: July 27, 2001 (aged 72) Los Angeles, U.S.
- Genres: Jazz, Hard Bop, Post-Bop
- Instrument: Tenor Saxophone
- Years active: 1954-2001

Harold de Vance Land (December 18, 1928 – July 27, 2001) was an American hard bop and post-bop tenor saxophonist. Land developed his hard bop playing with the Max Roach/Clifford Brown band into a personal, modern style, often rivalling Clifford Brown's instrumental ability with his own inventive and whimsical solos. His tone was strong and emotional, yet hinted at a certain introspective fragility.

== Biography ==
Land was born in Houston, Texas, United States and grew up in San Diego, California. He started playing at the age of 16. He made his first recording as the leader of the Harold Land All-Stars, for Savoy Records in 1949. In 1954, he joined the Clifford Brown/Max Roach Quintet, with whom he was at the forefront of the hard-bop/bebop movement. The Land family moved from San Diego to Los Angeles, in 1955. There he played with Curtis Counce, led his own groups, and co-led groups with Bobby Hutcherson, Blue Mitchell, and Red Mitchell. From the 1970s onwards, his style showed the influence of John Coltrane.

In the early 1980s through to the early 1990s he worked regularly with the Timeless All Stars, a group sponsored by the Timeless jazz record label. The group consisted of Land on tenor, Cedar Walton on piano, Buster Williams on bass, Billy Higgins on drums, Curtis Fuller on trombone and Bobby Hutcherson on vibes. Land also toured with his own band during this time, often including his son, Harold Land Jr., on piano and usually featuring Bobby Hutcherson and Billy Higgins as well. During these years he played regularly at Hop Singh's in Marina Del Rey in the L.A. area and the Keystone Korner in San Francisco.

Land was a professor at the University of California, Los Angeles. He joined the UCLA Jazz Studies Program as a lecturer in 1996 to teach instrumental jazz combo. "Harold Land was one of the major contributors in the history of the jazz saxophone," said jazz guitarist Kenny Burrell, founder and director of the UCLA Jazz Studies Program.

Land died in July 2001, from a stroke, at the age of 72.

== Playing style ==
Land had an inimitably dark tone within the hard-bop and modal jazz paradigms. Over time this would contrast more and more with the brighter tonalities of more Coltrane-influenced saxophonists, although Land started to implement Coltrane's musical innovations. Land's "dire, brooding [tenor saxophone] sound began somewhere between rhythm and blues and Coleman Hawkins, and after the early 1960s owed more and more to John Coltrane's harmonies, phrasing and experiments with modalism."

== Discography ==
=== As leader/co-leader ===
Year recorded	Title	Label	Year released	Personnel/Notes
1958-01	Harold in the Land of Jazz	Contemporary	1958	Quintet, with Land (tenor sax), Rolf Ericson (trumpet), Carl Perkins (piano), Leroy Vinnegar (bass), Frank Butler (drums); reissued as Grooveyard (Contemporary, 1963)
1958-11	Jazz at the Cellar 1958	Lone Hill Jazz	2007	Quartet, with Land (tenor sax), Elmo Hope (piano), Scott LaFaro (bass), Lenny McBrowne (drums)
1959-08	The Fox	HiFi Jazz	1960	Quintet, with Land (tenor sax), Dupree Bolton (trumpet), Elmo Hope (piano), Herbie Lewis (bass), Frank Butler (drums)
1960-05	West Coast Blues!	Jazzland	1960	Sextet, with Land (tenor sax), Joe Gordon (trumpet), Barry Harris (piano), Wes Montgomery (guitar), Sam Jones (bass), Louis Hayes (drums)
1960-07	Eastward Ho! Harold Land in New York	Jazzland	1961	Quintet, with Land (tenor sax), Kenny Dorham (trumpet), Amos Trice (piano), Clarence Jones (bass), Joe Peters (drums)
1960-07	Take Aim	Blue Note	1980	Quintet, with Land (tenor sax), Martin Banks (trumpet), Amos Trice (piano), Clarence Jones (bass), Leon Pettis (drums)
1961-10; 1961-12	Hear Ye! – with Red Mitchell	Atlantic	1962	Quintet, with Land (tenor sax), Red Mitchell (bass), Carmell Jones (trumpet), Frank Strazzeri (piano), Leon Pettis (drums)
1963-07	Jazz Impressions of Folk Music	Imperial	1963	Quintet, with Land (tenor sax), Carmell Jones (trumpet), John Houston (piano), Jim Bond (bass), Mel Lee (drums)
1967-12; 1968-02	The Peace-Maker	Cadet	1968	Quintet, with Land (tenor sax), Bobby Hutcherson (vibes), Joe Sample (piano), Buster Williams (bass), Donald Bailey (drums, harmonica)
1969–07	Blow Up – with Bobby Hutcherson	Jazz Music Yesterday	1990	Quintet, with Bobby Hutcherson (vibes). Stanley Cowell (piano), Reggie Johnson (bass), Joe Chambers (drums). Live at Jazz à Juan in Juan-les-Pins.
1971?	A New Shade of Blue	Mainstream	1971	Sextet, with Land (tenor sax), Bobby Hutcherson (vibes), Bill Henderson (piano, electric piano), Buster Williams (bass), Billy Hart (drums), James Mtume (congas)
1971?	Choma (Burn)	Mainstream	1971	Septet, with Land (tenor sax), Bobby Hutcherson (vibes, marimba), Bill Henderson (piano), Harold Land Jr. (piano, electric piano), Reggie Johnson (bass), Billy Hart (drums), Ndugu Chancler and Woody Theus (drums)
1972?	Damisi	Mainstream	1972	Quintet, with Land (tenor sax, oboe), Oscar Brashear (trumpet), Bill Henderson (piano, electric piano), Buster Williams (bass), Ndugu Chancler (drums)
1977-04	Mapenzi – with Blue Mitchell	Concord Jazz	1977	Quintet, with Land (tenor sax), Blue Mitchell (trumpet, flugelhorn), Kirk Lightsey (keyboards), Reggie Johnson (bass), Albert Heath (drums)
1980-12	Live at Junk – with Eiji Kitamura	Yupiteru	1981	Quintet, with Land (tenor sax), Eiji Kitamura (clarinet), Toshihiko Ogawa (piano), Mitsuaki Furuno (bass), Donald Bailey (drums); live
1981-10	Xocia's Dance	Muse	1982	Septet, with Land (tenor sax), Oscar Brashear (trumpet, flugelhorn), Bobby Hutcherson (vibes), George Cables (piano), John Heard (bass), Billy Higgins (drums), Ray Armando (percussion)
1984-06	Topology – with Makoto Terashita	Aketa's Disk	1984	Quintet, with Land (tenor sax), Makoto Terashita (piano), Yasushi Yoneki (bass), Mike Reznikoff (drums), Takayuki Koizumi (percussion)
1994-12	A Lazy Afternoon	Postcards	1995	Quartet, with Land (tenor sax), Bill Henderson (piano), James Leary (bass), Billy Higgins (drums)
2000-08	Promised Land	Audiophoric	2000	Quartet, with Land (tenor sax), Mulgrew Miller (piano), Ray Drummond (bass), Billy Higgins (drums)

=== As a member ===
The Timeless All Stars

- It's Timeless (Timeless, 1982)
- Timeless Heart (Timeless, 1983)
- Essence (Delos, 1986)
- Time for the Timeless All Stars (Early Bird, 1990)

=== As sideman ===
With Clifford Brown and Max Roach

- Jam Session (EmArcy, 1954) - with Maynard Ferguson and Clark Terry
- Brown and Roach Incorporated (EmArcy, 1954)
- Daahoud (Mainstream, 1973) – rec. 1954
- Clifford Brown & Max Roach (EmArcy, 1954)
- Study in Brown (EmArcy, 1955)

With Curtis Counce

- The Curtis Counce Group (Contemporary, 1956)
- You Get More Bounce with Curtis Counce! (Contemporary, 1957)
- Carl's Blues (Contemporary, 1960) – rec. 1957
- Exploring the Future (Dooto, 1958)
- Sonority (Contemporary, 1989) – rec. 1957-1958

With Victor Feldman

- Vic Feldman on Vibes (Mode, 1957)
- Soviet Jazz Themes (Äva, 1962)

With Hampton Hawes

- For Real! (Contemporary, 1961) – rec. 1958
- Universe (Prestige, 1972)

With Billy Higgins

- Bridgework (Contemporary, 1987)
- ¾ for Peace (Red, 1993)
- Billy Higgins Quintet (Sweet Basil, 1993)

With Bobby Hutcherson

- Total Eclipse (Blue Note, 1969) – rec. 1968
- Now! (Blue Note, 1970) – rec. 1969
- San Francisco (Blue Note, 1971) – rec. 1970
- Head On (Blue Note, 1971)
- Cirrus (Blue Note, 1974)
- Medina (Blue Note, 1980) – rec. 1969
- Inner Glow (Blue Note, 1980) – rec. 1975
- Farewell Keystone (Theresa, 1988) – rec. 1982
- Blow Up (Jazz Music Yesterday, 1990) – rec. 1969

With Carmell Jones

- The Remarkable Carmell Jones (Pacific Jazz, 1961)
- Business Meeting (Pacific Jazz, 1962)

With Philly Joe Jones

- Advance! (Galaxy, 1978)
- Drum Song (Galaxy, 1985) – rec. 1978

With Wes Montgomery

- Montgomeryland (Pacific Jazz, 1958)
- Wes, Buddy and Monk Montgomery (Pacific Jazz, 1959)
- Easy Groove (Pacific Jazz, 1966)

With Blue Mitchell

- Stratosonic Nuances (RCA, 1975)
- African Violet (Impulse!, 1977)
- Mapenzi (Concord, 1977)
- Summer Soft (Impulse!, 1978)

With Shorty Rogers

- The Swingin' Nutcracker (RCA Victor, 1960)
- An Invisible Orchard (RCA Victor, 1997) – rec. 1961

With Gerald Wilson

- You Better Believe It! (Pacific Jazz, 1961)
- Moment of Truth (Pacific Jazz, 1962)
- Portraits (Pacific Jazz, 1964)
- On Stage (Pacific Jazz, 1965)
- Feelin' Kinda Blues (Pacific Jazz, 1965)
- The Golden Sword (Pacific Jazz, 1966)
- Live and Swinging (Pacific Jazz, 1967)
- Everywhere (Pacific Jazz, 1968)
- California Soul (Pacific Jazz, 1968)
- Eternal Equinox (Pacific Jazz, 1969)
- Lomelin (Discovery, 1981)
- Jessica (Trend, 1982)
- Calafia (Trend, 1985)

With others

- Roy Ayers, Virgo Vibes (Atlantic, 1967)
- Jimmy Bond, James Bond Songbook (Mirwood, 1966)
- Donald Byrd, Ethiopian Knights (Blue Note, 1971)
- Dolo Coker, Dolo! (Xanadu, 1976)
- Bill Evans, Quintessence (Fantasy Records, 1976)
- Ella Fitzgerald, Things Ain't What They Used to Be (And You Better Believe It) (1969)
- Red Garland. Red Alert (Galaxy, 1977)
- Herb Geller, Fire in the West (Jubilee, 1957)
- Chico Hamilton, Chic Chic Chico (Impulse!, 1965)
- Al Hibbler, Sings The Blues - Monday Every Day (Reprise, 1961)
- Elmo Hope, The Elmo Hope Quintet featuring Harold Land (Pacific Jazz, 1957)
- Freddie Hubbard, Born to Be Blue (Pablo, 1982)
- Les McCann, Les McCann Sings (Pacific Jazz, 1961)
- Thelonious Monk, Thelonious Monk at the Blackhawk (Riverside 1960)
- Frank Rosolino, Free for All (Fantasy, 1987) – rec. 1958
- Jack Sheldon, Jack's Groove (GNP, 1961)
- Dinah Washington, Dinah Jams (EmArcy, 1955)
- Gerald Wiggins, Wiggin' Out (HiFi Jazz, 1960)
- Jimmy Woods, Conflict (Contemporary, 1963)
- Jimmy Rowles Sextet, Let's Get Acquainted With Jazz (For People Who Hate Jazz) (Tampa Records, 1957)
