= Introducing Carl Perkins =

Studio album by Carl Perkins
- Released: 1956
- Recorded: 1955
- Studio: Los Angeles, CA
- Genre: Jazz
- Length: 38:24
- Label: Dootone; DL 211
- Producer: Dootsie Williams

Introducing Carl Perkins is the sole album led by American jazz pianist Carl Perkins recorded in 1955 and released on the Dootone label the following year.

== Reception ==
Professional ratings
Review scores
Source	Rating
Allmusic	4.5/5 stars
The Penguin Guide to Jazz Recordings	3/4 stars

The Allmusic review by Michael G. Nastos stated: "Recorded two years before legendary West Coast pianist's death. ... Six Perkins originals make this an important document. He was an important sideman. Here as a leader he shows his true worth".

== Track listing ==
All compositions by Carl Perkins except where noted

1. "Way Cross Town" – 3:40
2. "You Don't Know What Love Is" (Gene de Paul, Don Raye) – 3:28
3. "The Lady Is a Tramp" (Richard Rodgers, Lorenz Hart) – 3:15
4. "Marblehead" – 3:40
5. "Woody 'n' You" (Dizzy Gillespie) – 4:13
6. "Westside" – 2:05
7. "Just Friends" (John Klenner, Sam M. Lewis) – 2:45
8. "It Could Happen to You" (Jimmy Van Heusen, Johnny Burke) – 3:03
9. "Why Do I Care" – 4:00
10. "Lilacs in the Rain" (Peter DeRose, Mitchell Parish) – 3:25
11. "Carl's Blues" – 4:50

== Personnel ==
- Carl Perkins – piano
- Leroy Vinnegar – bass
- Larance Marable – drums
