= Stablemates (album) =

Studio album by Blue Mitchell
- Released: 1977
- Recorded: April 28–29, 1977
- Studio: Sage & Sand Studios, Hollywood, California
- Genre: Jazz
- Length: 42:33
- Label: Candid
- Producer: Lew Tabackin, Yasuyuki Ishihara

Blue Mitchell chronology
Mapenzi (1977)	Stablemates (1977)	Summer Soft (1977)

Discomate Cover

Stablemates is an album by American trumpeter Blue Mitchell recorded in 1977 and originally released on the Japanese label Discomate before being released on CD on the Candid label in 2006. The album's name comes from its first track, a tune written by Benny Golson that first appeared on Miles: The New Miles Davis Quintet. The album was also released on the budget Jazz America Marketing label as Last Dance.

== Reception ==
Allmusic awarded the album 3½ stars.

Professional ratings
Review scores
Source	Rating
Allmusic	3.5/5 stars

== Track listing ==
1. "Stablemates" (Benny Golson) - 6:00
2. "A Portrait of Jennie" (Gordon Burdge, J. Russel Robinson) - 7:39
3. "There Will Never Be Another You" (Mack Gordon, Harry Warren) - 7:05
4. "Getting Sentimental Over Blue" (Victor Feldman, Blue Mitchell) - 7:01
5. "I Can't Get Started" (Vernon Duke, Ira Gershwin) - 8:35
6. "Ow!" (Dizzy Gillespie) - 6:13

- Recorded in Los Angeles, California on April 28–30, 1977.

== Personnel ==
- Blue Mitchell - trumpet
- Dick Spencer - alto saxophone
- Victor Feldman - piano
- John Heard - bass
- Dick Berk - drums
