= Take Aim (album) =

Studio album by Harold Land
- Released: 1980
- Recorded: July 25, 1960
- Studio: Radio Recorders, Los Angeles.
- Genre: Jazz
- Length: 57:23
- Label: Blue Note
- Producer: Leonard Feather

Harold Land chronology
| Eastward Ho! Harold Land in New York (1960) | Take Aim (1980) | Hear Ye! (1961) |

Take Aim is a studio album by American hard bop tenor saxophonist Harold Land. The album was recorded in Los Angeles in 1960 but released only in 1980 via Blue Note label. This rare record was re-released on CD in 2005 and 2012.

== Reception ==
Professional ratings
Review scores
| Source | Rating |
|---|---|
| AllMusic | 2.5/5 stars |
| The Penguin Guide to Jazz Recordings | 3/4 stars |

George Harris of All About Jazz stated: "Take Aim has all of the features of classic hard bop: tight ensemble work, creative and hard-driving solos, and crisp rhythm work. It makes you wonder where Leon Pettis has been all these years. At times, the drummer sounds like thunder from on high as he pushes this band. Martin Banks is articulate and has that Brownie quality in his trumpet solos. Of course, Land, with an immediately identifiable rough yet light sound, is the epitome of hard bop. His music sounds as fresh today as the moment it was recorded over forty years ago."

Scott Yanow of AllMusic wrote: "This little-known Blue Note session by tenor saxophonist Harold Land went unreleased until this 1980 LP. Land and an obscure supporting cast (trumpeter Martin Banks, pianist Amos Trice, bassist Clarence Jones, and drummer Leon Pettis) perform five hard bop originals and a lyrical 'You're My Thrill'. The performances, which are now hard to find, should interest Land collectors and fans of the era's modern mainstream jazz, although overall the results are not that memorable."

== Track listing ==
| No. | Title | Writer(s) | Length |
|---|---|---|---|
| 1. | "As You Like It" | Land | 7:11 |
| 2. | "Take Aim" | Amos Trice | 3:39 |
| 3. | "Land of Peace" | Leonard Feather | 6:16 |
| 4. | "Reflections" | Land | 6:42 |
| 5. | "Blue Nellie" | Martin Banks | 4:50 |
| 6. | "You're My Thrill" | Jay Gorney, Sidney Clare | 7:58 |
| 7. | "Straight, No Chaser" | Thelonious Monk | 20:47 |
| Total length: | | | 57:23 |

== Personnel ==
- Harold Land – tenor saxophone
- Martin Banks – trumpet
- Amos Trice – piano
- Clarence Jones – bass
- Leon Pettis – drums
