= Carl's Blues =

Studio album by The Curtis Counce Group
- Released: 1960
- Recorded: April 22 & August 29, 1957 and January 6, 1958
- Studio: Contemporary Studios in Los Angeles, California
- Genre: Jazz
- Length: 41:02
- Label: Contemporary M3574/S7574
- Producer: Lester Koenig

Curtis Counce chronology
You Get More Bounce with Curtis Counce! (1957)	Carl's Blues (1960)	Sonority (1989)

Carl's Blues is an album by American jazz bassist Curtis Counce recorded in 1957 and 1958 and released on the Contemporary label.

== Reception ==
The Allmusic review by Scott Yanow calls it "Excellent music that still sounds fresh four decades later".

Professional ratings
Review scores
Source	Rating
Allmusic	4/5 stars
The Rolling Stone Jazz Record Guide	3/5 stars
The Penguin Guide to Jazz Recordings	3/4 stars

== Track listing ==
1. "Pink Lady" (Jack Sheldon) - 4:36
2. "I Can't Get Started" (Ira Gershwin, Vernon Duke) - 7:59
3. "Nica's Dream" (Horace Silver) - 7:58
4. "Love Walked In" (George Gershwin, Ira Gershwin) - 4:58
5. "Larue" (Clifford Brown) - 4:59
6. "The Butler Did It" (Frank Butler) - 4:38
7. "Carl's Blues" (Carl Perkins) - 5:54
- Recorded at Contemporary Studios in Los Angeles, CA on April 22, 1957 (tracks 1 & 4), August 29, 1957 (track 3) and January 6, 1958 (tracks 2 & 5–7)

== Personnel ==
- Curtis Counce - bass
- Jack Sheldon (tracks 1–4 & 6), Gerald Wilson (tracks 5 & 7) - trumpet
- Harold Land - tenor saxophone
- Carl Perkins - piano
- Frank Butler - drums
