= One Long String =

Studio album by Red Mitchell Trio
- Released: 1969
- Recorded: February 19, 1969; Paris, France
- Genre: Jazz
- Length: 48:07
- Label: Mercury 135.714
- Producer: Jean-Claude Desmarty

Red Mitchell chronology
Hear Ye! (1962)	One Long String (1969)	Bästisar! (1973)

One Long String is an album by American jazz bassist Red Mitchell's Trio featuring Swedish pianist Bobo Stenson and drummer Rune Carlsson recorded in Paris in 1969 and first released on the Mercury label.

== Reception ==
The Allmusic review by Jason Ankeny states "The album percolates with energy and daring, with an underlying soulfulness ...For all the mechanics at work throughout One Long String, the end result is a record that never loses focus or its sense of collaborative spirit".

Professional ratings
Review scores
Source	Rating
Allmusic	4/5 stars

== Track listing ==
All compositions by Red Mitchell except as indicated

1. "One Long String" – 5:53
2. "Peggy" – 5:16
3. "Narbild" (F. Sjöström) – 7:19
4. "Undertow" – 4:10
5. "Total Tumult" – 4:56
6. "Stella by Starlight" (Ned Washington, Victor Young) – 6:46
7. "Pojken I Grottan" (Bobo Stenson) – 4:59
8. "When I Have You" – 8:48

== Personnel ==
- Red Mitchell – bass
- Bobo Stenson – piano
- Rune Carlsson – drums
