= Stop the World I Want to Get Off (album) =

Stop the World I Want To Get Off

Studio album by Victor Feldman
- Released: 1962
- Recorded: 1962
- Studio: World Pacific Studios, Hollywood, CA
- Genre: Jazz
- Length: 33:06
- Label: World Pacific; WP-1807
- Producer: Richard Bock

Victor Feldman chronology
Merry Olde Soul (1961)	Stop the World I Want To Get Off (1962)	A Taste of Honey and a Taste of Bossa Nova (1962)

Professional ratings
Review scores
Source	Rating
Allmusic	3/5 stars

Stop the World I Want to Get Off is an album by vibraphonist and pianist Victor Feldman featuring tunes from Anthony Newley and Leslie Bricusse's stage musical Stop the World - I Want to Get Off recorded in 1962 and released on the World Pacific label.

== Track listing ==
All compositions by Anthony Newley and Leslie Bricusse.

1. "Gonna Build a Mountain" – 5:15
2. "ABC Song" – 4:10
3. "What Kind of Fool Am I?" – 4:41
4. "Lumbered" – 3:32
5. "Typically English" – 4:34
6. "I Wanna Be Rich" – 5:04
7. "Little Boy" – 5:50

== Personnel ==
- Victor Feldman – vibraphone, piano
- Bob Whitlock – bass
- Lawrence Marable – drums
