= The Stepper =

Studio album by Frank Butler
- Released: 1978
- Recorded: November 19, 1977, Los Angeles CA
- Genre: Jazz
- Label: Xanadu; 152
- Producer: Don Schlitten

Frank Butler chronology
Groovin' Blue (1961)	The Stepper (1978)	Wheelin' and Dealin' (1978)

The Stepper is an album by drummer Frank Butler which was recorded in 1977 and released on the Xanadu label.

== Reception ==
Professional ratings
Review scores
Source	Rating
Allmusic	4.5/5 stars

The Allmusic review recommended the album awarding it album 4½ stars and stating "the drummer is in top form on this quartet date... He never loses the listener's attention during his two long drum solos... this LP should be snapped up without delay by bop fans".

== Track listing ==
All compositions by Dolo Coker except as indicated

1. "The Stepper" - 19:58
2. "Au Privave" (Charlie Parker) - 4:43
3. "Captain Kidd" - 5:51
4. "Easy Living" (Leo Robin, Ralph Rainger) - 5:38
5. "Urbane" – 8:36

== Personnel ==
- Frank Butler - drums
- Jack Montrose - tenor saxophone (tracks 1 & 3–5)
- Dolo Coker - piano
- Monty Budwig - bass
