= Promised Land (Harold Land album) =

Studio album by Harold Land
- Released: March 27, 2001
- Recorded: August 6, 2000
- Studio: David Philips Sound Studio, La Jolla, CA
- Genre: Jazz
- Length: 55:52
- Label: Audiophoric APCD JZ-0002
- Producer: Daniel I. Atkinson

Harold Land chronology
A Lazy Afternoon (1995)	Promised Land (2001)

Professional ratings
Review scores
Source	Rating
Allmusic	4/5 stars

Promised Land is the final studio album by American hard bop tenor saxophonist Harold Land. The album was recorded in La Jolla, CA and released on 27 March 2001 via Audiophoric label.

== Reception ==
David R. Adler of Allmusic wrote "Veteran tenor saxophonist Harold Land returns from a seven-year recording hiatus with Promised Land, featuring Mulgrew Miller on piano, Ray Drummond on bass, and Billy Higgins on drums. (Sadly, this would be one of Higgins's last sessions.) One would expect nothing other than beauty and grace from these four revered players, and that's what they deliver, aided by the Audiophoric label's "m-phoric" recording technology, designed to capture live acoustic performance with exceptional fidelity. (You'll need to increase your volume and give your ears a chance to adjust.) There's a bit of Coltrane and Joe Henderson in Land's playing—and perhaps a bit of Charlie Rouse, too, as Monk's "Ugly Beauty" reveals. Miller is in excellent form, dueting with Land on a nine-minute-plus "What's New" and taking crisp, inventive solos throughout. The program is evenly split: three standards and three of Land's fairly straightforward, modal pieces."

A reviewer of All About Jazz stated "Time allows, eventually, the opportunity for self-actualization—one hopes. After a long, under-appreciated career and sparse discography, tenor saxophonist, Harold Land, affirms his stature on this album as an individual stylist. Land’s sound has matured into something distinctly his own—a combination of the swing style of his early career and a full command of Coltrane-inspired “sheets of sound”...Notwithstanding the solid group dynamic between tenor and rhythm section, it is the leader’s voice that prevails throughout this set. Straight-ahead fans will find fulfillment in this album from an often-overlooked jazz veteran."

== Track listing ==
No.	Title	Writer(s)	Length
1.	"Inner Voice"	Land	8:33
2.	"Ugly Beauty"	Thelonious Monk	7:16
3.	"What's New?"	Bob Haggart, Land	9:17
4.	"Dark Mood"	Land	10:57
5.	"Like Someone in Love"	Jimmy Van Heusen, Johnny Burke	12:30
6.	"Mapenzi"	Land	7:14
Total length:			55:52

== Personnel ==
- Harold Land – tenor saxophone
- Ray Drummond – bass
- Billy Higgins – drums
- Mulgrew Miller – piano
