= Mapenzi =

Studio album by Harold Land-Blue Mitchell Quintet
- Released: 1977
- Recorded: April 14, 1977
- Studio: Sunwest, Los Angeles, California
- Genre: Jazz
- Length: 42:30
- Label: Concord
- Producer: Carl Jefferson

Blue Mitchell chronology
African Violet (1977)	Mapenzi (1977)	Stablemates (1977)

Harold Land chronology
Damisi (1972)	Mapenzi (1977)	Xocia's Dance (1981)

CD Cover

Mapenzi is a studio album by American jazz musician Harold Land and Blue Mitchell quintet. The album was released in 1977 by Concord label.

== Reception ==
Allmusic awarded the album 4½ stars with reviewer Scott Yanow stating "this is an excellent example of 1977 hard bop".

Professional ratings
Review scores
Source	Rating
Allmusic	4.5/5 stars

== Track listing ==
All compositions by Harold Land except as indicated

1. "Mapenzi" - 5:15
2. "Rapture" - 5:08
3. "Habiba" (Kirk Lightsey) - 10:19
4. "Blue Silver" (Blue Mitchell) - 4:58
5. "Everything's Changed" (Kirk Lightsey) - 5:13
6. "Inner Voice" - 6:08
7. "Tres Senderos" - 5:29
- Recorded at Sunwest Recording Studios in Hollywood, California on April 14, 1977.

== Personnel ==
- Blue Mitchell - trumpet, flugelhorn
- Harold Land - tenor saxophone
- Kirk Lightsey - piano
- Reggie Johnson - bass
- Albert Heath - drums
