= ¾ for Peace =

Studio album by Billy Higgins
- Released: 1993?
- Recorded: January 27, 1993
- Genre: Jazz
- Length: 70:57
- Label: Red; RR 123 258-2
- Producer: Dennis Sullivan

Billy Higgins chronology
Bridgework (1987)	¾ for Peace (1993)	Billy Higgins Quintet (1993)

¾ for Peace is an album led by drummer Billy Higgins, recorded in 1993 and released by Red Records.

== Recording and music ==
The album was recorded on January 27, 1993, in Los Angeles. In addition to Higgins, the musicians were Harold Land on tenor and soprano saxophones, Bill Henderson on piano, and Jeff Littleton on bass. "Something for Juno" is Higgins's tribute to Juno Lewis, who was a percussionist.

== Release and reception ==
Professional ratings
Review scores
Source	Rating
AllMusic	2.5/5 stars
The Penguin Guide to Jazz	3/4 stars

¾ for Peace was released by Red Records. AllMusic awarded the album 2½ stars. The Penguin Guide to Jazz wrote that the main interest was in the interaction between Land and Higgins, and described the recording as "A subtle, insistent record that recalls aspects of Max Roach's association with Clifford Brown".

== Track listing ==
1. "¾ for Peace" (William Henderson) - 8:35
2. "In the Trenches" (Charles Tolliver) - 5:27
3. "Together With Love" (Henderson) - 7:15
4. "Short Subject" (Harold Land) - 7:42
5. "Dark Mood" (Land) - 10:46
6. "What's New?" (Johnny Burke, Bob Haggart) - 7:57
7. "Step Right up to the Bottom" (Land) - 9:19
8. "Someday My Prince Will Come" (Frank Churchill, Larry Morey) - 7:48
9. "Something for Juno (A Drums Suite Dedicated to Juno Lewis)" (Billy Higgins) - 6:08

== Personnel ==
- Billy Higgins - drums
- Harold Land - soprano saxophone, tenor saxophone
- Bill Henderson - piano
- Jeff Littleton - bass
