= Frank Morgan (album) =

Studio album by Frank Morgan with Conte Candoli and Machito's Rhythm Section
- Released: 1955
- Recorded: January 29 and March 31, 1955
- Studio: Capitol Melrose Ave (Hollywood)
- Genre: Jazz
- Length: 43:16 CD reissue with additional live tracks
- Labels: Gene Norman Presents; GNP Vol. No. 12
- Producer: Gene Norman

Frank Morgan chronology
Frank Morgan (1955)	Easy Living (1985)

Frank Morgan (also referred to as Gene Norman Presents Frank Morgan) is an album by saxophonist Frank Morgan with trumpeter Conte Candoli and Machito's Rhythm Section which was recorded in 1955 and released on the Gene Norman Presents label. The album would be Morgan's only release for 30 years until his comeback in 1985.

== Reception ==
Professional ratings
Review scores
Source	Rating
Allmusic	5/5 stars
The Penguin Guide to Jazz Recordings	3/4 stars

The review by Allmusic's Scott Yanow said: "When altoist Frank Morgan recorded his debut as a leader in 1955, he was being hyped as "the new Bird." Unfortunately, he seemed to generally follow in Charlie Parker's footsteps by becoming a drug addict. After 30 years passed, he recorded his second album and seriously began his successful comeback. This GNP album features Morgan back at the beginning, performing four numbers with Machito's rhythm section and six other songs with a septet that also includes tenor saxophonist, Wardell Gray (heard on his final recordings). Trumpeter Conte Candoli is a major asset on both of these "boppish" dates, while Morgan shows why he was rated so highly at this point in his career".

== Track listing ==
All compositions by Frank Morgan except where noted

1. "Bernie's Tune" (Bernie Miller, Jerry Leiber, Mike Stoller) – 5:30
2. "My Old Flame" (Sam Coslow, Arthur Johnston) – 4:40
3. "I'll Remember April" (Gene de Paul, Patricia Johnston, Don Raye) – 4:20
4. "Neil's Blues" – 5:00
5. "The Champ" (Dizzy Gillespie) – 4:48
6. "Chooch" – 3:30
7. "The Nearness of You" (Hoagy Carmichael, Ned Washington) – 5:10
8. "Whippet" – 4:25
9. "Milt's Tune" (Milt Jackson) – 4:32
10. "Get Happy" (Harold Arlen, Ted Koehler) – 3:57

Bonus tracks on CD reissue in 1991:

11. "Crescendo Blues" (Jack Sheldon) – 6:04
12. "Huh!" – 6:32
13. "Autumn Leaves" (Joseph Kosma, Jacques Prévert, Johnny Mercer) – 3:38
14. "Well, You Needn't" (Thelonious Monk) – 6:17
15. "B.T." (Bobby Timmons) – 3:58
- Recorded at Capitol Studios in Los Angeles, CA on January 29, 1955 (tracks 1–4) and March 31, 1955 (tracks 5–10) and live at The Crescendo in Los Angeles CA on August 11, 1956 (tracks 11–15)

== Personnel ==
=== Performance ===
- Frank Morgan – alto saxophone
- Conte Candoli (tracks 1–10), Jack Sheldon (tracks 11–15) – trumpet
- Wardell Gray – tenor saxophone (tracks 2,4,5,7,9 & 10)
- James Clay – tenor saxophone, flute (tracks 11–15)
- Wild Bill Davis – organ (tracks 1,3,6,8)
- Carl Perkins (tracks 2,4,5,7,9 & 10), Bobby Timmons (tracks 11–15) – piano
- Howard Roberts – guitar (tracks 2,4,5,7,9 & 10)
- Jimmy Bond (tracks 11–15), Leroy Vinnegar (tracks 2,4,5,7,9 & 10), Robert Rodriguez (tracks 1,3,6,8) – bass
- Lawrence Marable – drums, percussion (tracks 2,4,5,7,9–15)
- Rafael Miranda congas (tracks 1,3,6,8)
- Jose Mangual – bongos (tracks 1,3,6,8)
- Ubaldo Nieto – timbales (tracks 1,3,6,8)
