= Vic Feldman on Vibes =

Studio album by Victor Feldman
- Released: 1957
- Recorded: September 1957
- Studio: Radio Recorders, Los Angeles, CA
- Genre: Jazz
- Length: 27:17
- Label: Mode; MOD-LP 120
- Producer: Red Clyde

Victor Feldman chronology
Transatlantic Alliance (1957)	Vic Feldman on Vibes (1957)	The Arrival of Victor Feldman (1958)

Mallets A Fore Thought cover

Vic Feldman on Vibes, subtitled Champagne Music for Cats Who Don't Drink and also reissued as Mallets A Fore Thought, is an album by vibraphonist Victor Feldman recorded in 1957 and originally released on the Mode label.

== Reception ==
Professional ratings
Review scores
Source	Rating
Allmusic	3/5 stars

The Allmusic review by Scott Yanow called it an "enjoyable and relaxed bop date". On All About Jazz Samuel Chell observed: "Feldman's versatility may have worked against him, as it caused the limited jazz public to view him as a 'miscellaneous musician,' with vibes another rabbit in his bag of tricks. But listening to him closely is to experience a player who eschews the slow vibrators of Milt Jackson while making melodic sense on his own terms. In fact, he may deserve as much credit as Gary Burton for moving the instrument forward after Jackson had brought it into the age of bebop".

== Track listing ==
All compositions by Victor Feldman except where noted.

1. "Fidelius" – 2:48
2. "Squeeze Me" (Fats Waller, Clarence Williams) – 3:20
3. "Sweet and Lovely" (Gus Arnheim, Jules LeMare, Harry Tobias) – 3:44
4. "Bass Reflex" – 3:59
5. "Chart of My Heart" (Bob Newman) – 3:28
6. "Wilbert's Tune" – 4:00
7. "Evening in Paris" – 5:58

== Personnel ==
- Victor Feldman – vibraphone
- Frank Rosolino – trombone (tracks 5–7)
- Harold Land – tenor saxophone (tracks 5–7)
- Carl Perkins – piano
- Leroy Vinnegar – bass
- Stan Levey – drums
