= Billy Higgins Quintet =

Studio album by Billy Higgins
- Released: 1993
- Recorded: April 18, 1993
- Studio: Power Station, New York City
- Genre: Jazz
- Label: Sweet Basil; APCZ 8003
- Producer: Shigeyuki Kawashima & Horst Liepolt

Billy Higgins chronology
¾ for Peace (1993)	Billy Higgins Quintet (1993)

Billy Higgins Quintet is an album by American jazz drummer Billy Higgins recorded in 1993 and released on the Sweet Basil label.

== Reception ==
Professional ratings
Review scores
Source	Rating
AllMusic	4/5 stars

The AllMusic review by Alex Henderson calls it a " fine album, which is without a dull moment".

== Track listing ==
1. "Step Right up to the Bottom" (Harold Land) - 8:12
2. "Seeker" (Oscar Brashear) - 10:54
3. "The Vision" (Cedar Walton) - 11:04
4. "Hot House" (Tadd Dameron) - 7:52
5. "You Must Believe in Spring" (Alan and Marilyn Bergman, Jacques Demy, Michel Legrand) - 10:10
6. "Jackie-ing" (Thelonious Monk) - 9:51
7. "Churn" (Oscar Brashear) - 15:23

== Personnel ==
- Billy Higgins - drums
- Harold Land - tenor saxophone
- Oscar Brashear - trumpet
- Cedar Walton - piano
- David Williams - bass
