= African Violet (album) =

Studio album by Blue Mitchell
- Released: March 13, 1978
- Recorded: 1977
- Studio: The Burbank Studios, Burbank, California
- Genre: Jazz
- Length: 45:11
- Label: Impulse!
- Producer: Esmond Edwards

Blue Mitchell chronology
Funktion Junction (1976)	African Violet (1978)	Mapenzi (1977)

Professional ratings
Review scores
Source	Rating
AllMusic	3/5 stars

African Violet is an album by American trumpeter Blue Mitchell which features arrangements by McKinley Mitchell recorded in 1977 and released on the Impulse! label in 1978.

== Track listing ==
1. "Mississippi Jump" (Larry Nash);– 6:38
2. "Ojos de Rojo" (Cedar Walton);– 4:04
3. "Sand Castles" (Dana Kaproff);– 6:08
4. "African Violet" (Steve Hulse);– 6:38
5. "As" (Stevie Wonder);– 6:28
6. "Square Business" (Cedar Walton);– 8:24
7. "Forget" (Don Sebesky);– 6:51
- Recorded at The Burbank Studios in Burbank, California in 1977.

== Personnel ==
- Blue Mitchell;– trumpet (tracks 1, 2, & 4–6), flugelhorn (tracks 3 & 7)
- Herman Riley (tracks 1 & 4), Harold Land (tracks 2, 3 & 5–7);– tenor saxophone
- Sonny Burke;– electric piano (tracks 1 & 4–7), piano (tracks 2 & 3)
- McKinley Jackson (tracks 2, 4 & 7), Michael Boddicker (tracks 3, 5 & 6);– synthesizer
- Lee Ritenour;– electric guitar (tracks 1–7), guitar (track 7)
- Scott Edwards;– bass (track 1), electric bass (tracks 2–4 & 6)
- Chuck Domanico;– electric bass (track 5), bass (track 7)
- James Gadson (tracks 1–4 & 6), Harold Mason (tracks 5 & 7);– drums
- Paulinho Da Costa;– congas (tracks 1, 2, 4 & 6)
- Eddie "Bongo" Brown;– congas, percussion (tracks 3, 5 & 7)
- Bob Zimmitti;– marimba (track 7), percussion (tracks 5 & 7)
- Julia Tillman, Luther Waters, Maxine Waters Willard, Oren Waters;– vocals (tracks 3 & 5)
- The Sid Sharp Strings (tracks 3 & 7)
