= Soviet Jazz Themes =

Studio album by The Victor Feldman All Stars
- Released: 1963
- Recorded: October 26 and November 12, 1962
- Studio: United Recording Studios, Hollywood, CA
- Genre: Jazz
- Length: 32:26
- Label: Äva; A/AS-19
- Producer: Leonard Feather

Victor Feldman chronology
A Taste of Honey and a Taste of Bossa Nova (1962)	Soviet Jazz Themes (1963)	David and Lisa (1963)

Professional ratings
Review scores
Source	Rating
Allmusic	2/5 stars

Soviet Jazz Themes (full title: The Victor Feldman All Stars Play the 'World's First Album of Soviet Jazz Themes) is an album by vibraphonist and pianist Victor Feldman featuring tunes by three composers he discovered while on Benny Goodman's 1962 tour of Russia which he recorded on returning to the U.S. and released on the Äva label.

== Track listing ==
1. "Ritual" (Andre Towmosian) – 5:01
2. "Blue Church Blues" (Gennadi Golstain) – 7:07
3. "Madrigal" (Golstain) – 6:21
4. "Vic" (Givi Gachechiladze) – 4:50
5. "Polyushko Polye" (Golstain) – 3:52
6. "Gennadi" (Golstain) – 5:15
- Recorded at United Recording Studios, Hollywood, CA on October 26, 1962 (tracks 1–3) and November 12, 1962 (tracks 4–6)

== Personnel ==
- Victor Feldman – vibraphone, piano
- Nat Adderley – cornet (tracks 1–3)
- Carmell Jones – trumpet (tracks 4–6)
- Harold Land – tenor saxophone
- Joe Zawinul – piano (tracks 1–3)
- Herb Ellis – guitar (tracks 4–6)
- Bob Whitlock – bass
- Frank Butler – drums
