= Choma (Burn) =

Studio album by Harold Land
- Released: 1971
- Recorded: 1971; Los Angeles, CA
- Genre: Jazz
- Length: 36:37
- Label: Mainstream; MRL 344
- Producer: Bob Shad

Harold Land chronology
A New Shade of Blue (1971)	Choma (Burn) (1971)	Damisi (1972)

Choma (Burn) is an album by American saxophonist Harold Land recorded in 1971 for the Mainstream label.

== Release and reception ==
Professional ratings
Review scores
Source	Rating
AllMusic	3/5 stars
The Virgin Encyclopedia of Jazz	3/5 stars

AllMusic awarded the album 3 stars, calling it a "Solid early '70s date". Choma (Burn) was re-released by WeWantSounds in 2024. The reviewer for The Wire wrote that it was "a more commercial mix of funk and modal jazz characteristic of their 70s quintet".

== Track listing ==
All compositions by Harold Land except as indicated

1. " Choma (Burn)" - 9:56
2. "Our Home" (Bill Henderson) - 5:52
3. "Black Caucus" - 10:03
4. "Up and Down" - 10:49

== Personnel ==
- Harold Land - tenor saxophone, flute
- Bobby Hutcherson - vibraphone, marimba
- Bill Henderson - piano, electric piano
- Harold Land, Jr. - piano
- Reggie Johnson - bass
- Ndugu Chancler, Woodrow 'Sonship' Theus - drums
