= Harold in the Land of Jazz =

1958 album by Harold Land

Studio album by Harold Land
- Released: 1958
- Recorded: January 13–14, 1958
- Studio: Contemporary Records Studio, Los Angeles, California
- Genre: Jazz
- Length: 47:11
- Label: Contemporary C 3550
- Producer: Lester Koenig

Harold Land chronology
Harold in the Land of Jazz (1958)	The Fox (1959)

Harold in the Land of Jazz (also released as Grooveyard) is the debut studio album by saxophonist Harold Land, recorded in 1958 and released on the Contemporary label.

== Background ==
Land's band on the album included jazz pianist Carl Perkins (not to be confused with the American Rockabilly singer and songwriter of the same name) in one of his final appearances on record. Perkins died two months after the recording session. The original LP cover showed Land playing his saxophone in front of the Watts Towers, which at the time had been condemned by the City of Los Angeles and were in danger of being destroyed.

== Reception ==
Professional ratings
Review scores
Source	Rating
AllMusic	4.5/5 stars
Tom Hull	B+
The Penguin Guide to Jazz Recordings	3/4 stars

The AllMusic review by Scott Yanow states: "Land shows that hard bop was very much alive in Los Angeles in the late '50s. His tone is cooler and softer than it would become later on, but it was already pretty distinctive".

== Track listing ==
All compositions by Harold Land except as indicated

1. "Speak Low" (Kurt Weill, Ogden Nash) - 5:35
2. "Delirium" - 6:40
3. "You Don't Know What Love Is" (Gene de Paul, Don Raye) - 3:55
4. "Nieta" (Elmo Hope) - 4:35
5. "Grooveyard" (Carl Perkins) - 7:02
6. "Lydia's Lament" - 5:46
7. "Smack Up" - 7:11
8. "Promised Land" - 6:27 Bonus track on CD reissue

== Personnel ==
- Harold Land - tenor saxophone
- Rolf Ericson - trumpet
- Carl Perkins - piano
- Leroy Vinnegar - bass
- Frank Butler - drums
