= West Coast Blues! =

Studio album by Harold Land
- Released: 1960
- Recorded: May 17–18, 1960; San Francisco
- Genre: Jazz
- Label: Jazzland

Harold Land chronology
The Fox (1960)	West Coast Blues! (1960)	Eastward Ho! Harold Land in New York (1960)

West Coast Blues! is a studio album by American tenor saxophonist Harold Land, released in 1960 by Jazzland label.

== Reception ==
Professional ratings
Review scores
Source	Rating
AllMusic	4/5 stars
The Penguin Guide to Jazz Recordings	3/4 stars
The Rolling Stone Jazz Record Guide	4/5 stars

According to Scott Yanow of AllMusic: "The music is as well-played and swinging as one would expect from this superior bop group."

== Track listing ==
1. "Ursula" (Harold Land) – 7:07
2. "Klactoveedsedstene" (Charlie Parker) – 9:59
3. "Don't Explain" (Arthur Herzog Jr., Billie Holiday) – 4:54
4. "West Coast Blues" (Wes Montgomery) – 6:02
5. "Terrain" (Land) – 7:46
6. "Compulsion" (Land) – 6:48

== Personnel ==
- Harold Land – tenor saxophone
- Wes Montgomery – guitar
- Joe Gordon – trumpet
- Barry Harris – piano
- Sam Jones – double bass
- Louis Hayes – drums

== External reviews ==
- AMG review: West Coast Blues!
