= You Get More Bounce with Curtis Counce! =

Studio album by Curtis Counce
- Released: 1957
- Recorded: October 8 & 15, 1956, April 27, May 13 and September 3, 1957; Contemporary Studios in Los Angeles, California
- Genre: Jazz
- Length: 44:39
- Label: Contemporary C3539/S7539
- Producer: Lester Koenig

Curtis Counce chronology
The Curtis Counce Group (1956)	You Get More Bounce with Curtis Counce! (1957)	Carl's Blues (1957-58)

Professional ratings
Review scores
Source	Rating
Allmusic	4.5/5 stars
The Rolling Stone Jazz Record Guide	4/5 stars
The Penguin Guide to Jazz Recordings	3/4 stars

You Get More Bounce with Curtis Counce! (later released as Councelation) is an album by American jazz bassist Curtis Counce recorded in 1956 and 1957 and released on the Contemporary label.

== Reception ==
The Allmusic review by Scott Yanow states

this was a band with plenty of solo strength. Their second Contemporary recording features five standards and two numbers by the leader. This excellent music falls somewhere between hard bop and cool jazz.

== Track listing ==
All compositions by Curtis Counce except as indicated

1. "Complete" - 5:51
2. "How Deep Is the Ocean?" (Irving Berlin) - 6:35
3. "Too Close for Comfort" (Jerry Bock, Larry Holofcener, George David Weiss) - 5:36
4. "Mean to Me" (Fred E. Ahlert, Roy Turk) - 4:31
5. "Stranger in Paradise" (Alexander Borodin, George Forrest, Robert Wright) - 7:03
6. "Counceltation" - 6:01
7. "Big Foot" (Charlie Parker) - 9:02
- Recorded at Contemporary Studios in Los Angeles, CA on October 8, 1956 (track 7), October 15, 1956 (track 5), April 27, 1957 (tracks 3 & 6), May 13, 1957 (tracks 1 & 2) and September 3, 1957 (track 4)

== Personnel ==
- Curtis Counce - bass
- Jack Sheldon - trumpet
- Harold Land - tenor saxophone
- Carl Perkins - piano
- Frank Butler - drums
