= Sonny Stitt Plays Jimmy Giuffre Arrangements =

Studio album by Sonny Stitt
- Released: 1959
- Recorded: February 16, 1959; Los Angeles, CA
- Genre: Jazz
- Length: 43:47
- Label: Verve; MGV 8309

Sonny Stitt chronology
The Hard Swing (1959)	Sonny Stitt Plays Jimmy Giuffre Arrangements (1959)	A Little Bit of Stitt (1959)

Sonny Stitt Plays Jimmy Giuffre Arrangements is an album by saxophonist Sonny Stitt performing music arranged by Jimmy Giuffre recorded in 1959 and originally released on the Verve label.

== Reception ==
Professional ratings
Review scores
Source	Rating
Allmusic	4.5/5 stars

The Allmusic site awarded the album 4½ stars.

== Track listing ==
All compositions by Sonny Stitt except as indicated

1. "New York Blues" (Jimmy Giuffre) - 3:56
2. "Giuff" - 2:58
3. "Laura" (David Raksin, Johnny Mercer) - 4:50
4. "Sonny Boy" (Ray Henderson, Buddy De Sylva, Lew Brown) - 3:57
5. "Down Country" (Stitt, Giuffre) - 6:57
6. "Singin' in the Rain" (Nacio Herb Brown, Arthur Freed) - 4:27
7. "Uptown" - 5:21
8. "Downtown" - 4:38
9. "I Let a Song Go Out of My Heart" (Duke Ellington, Irving Mills, Henry Nemo, John Redmond) - 3:23
10. "Two for Timbucktu" (Giuffre) - 3:20

== Personnel ==
- Sonny Stitt - alto saxophone, tenor saxophone
- Jimmy Giuffre - tenor saxophone, arranger
- Lee Katzman, Jack Sheldon - trumpet
- Frank Rosolino - trombone
- Al Pollen - tuba
- Jimmy Rowles – piano
- Buddy Clark – bass
- Lawrence Marable - drums
