= Hear Ye! =

Studio album by Red Mitchell-Harold Land Quintet
- Released: 1962
- Recorded: October 14 & December 13, 1961; Los Angeles, California
- Genre: Jazz
- Length: 52:41
- Label: Atlantic LP 1376
- Producer: Nesuhi Ertegun

Red Mitchell chronology
Rejoice! (1961)	Hear Ye! (1962)	One Long String (1969)

Harold Land chronology
Take Aim (1960)	Hear Ye! (1962)	Jazz Impressions of Folk Music (1963)

Hear Ye! is an album by the Red Mitchell-Harold Land Quintet recorded in 1961 and released on the Atlantic label.

== Reception ==
The Allmusic review by Scott Yanow states "This is a fine effort from a group that deserved greater recognition at the time".

Professional ratings
Review scores
Source	Rating
Allmusic	4.5/5 stars

== Track listing ==
1. "Triplin' Awhile" (Harold Land) - 7:46
2. "Rosie's Spirit" (Red Mitchell) - 5:26
3. "Hear Ye!" (Mitchell) - 6:54
4. "Somara" (Carmell Jones) - 6:42
5. "Catacomb" (Land) - 8:21
6. "Pari Passu" (Frank Strazzeri) - 4:55
- Recorded in San Francisco, CA on October 14 (tracks 1, 3 & 4) and December 13 (tracks 2, 5 & 6), 1961

== Personnel ==
- Red Mitchell - bass
- Harold Land - tenor saxophone
- Carmell Jones - trumpet
- Frank Strazzeri - piano
- Leon Petties - drums
