= Carl Perkins (pianist) =

American jazz pianist (1928–1958)

- Born: August 16, 1928; Indianapolis, Indiana, U.S.
- Died: March 17, 1958 (aged 29) Los Angeles, California, U.S.
- Genre: West Coast jazz
- Instrument: Piano
- Years active: 1948–1958

Carl Perkins (August 16, 1928 – March 17, 1958) was an American jazz pianist.

== Biography ==
Perkins was born in Indianapolis but worked mainly in Los Angeles. He is best remembered for his performances with the Curtis Counce Quintet, which also featured Harold Land, Jack Sheldon and drummer Frank Butler. He also performed with Tiny Bradshaw, Big Jay McNeely in 1948–49, and played dates with Miles Davis in 1950. Following a short stint in the Army (January 1951 to November 1952), he worked intermittently with the Oscar Moore Trio (1953–1955) and the Clifford Brown–Max Roach group in 1954. He recorded with Frank Morgan in 1955, and with his own group in 1956. Perkins composed the standard "Grooveyard".

His playing was influenced by his polio-affected left arm, which he held parallel to the keyboard. He used his elbow to play deep bass notes. He was thus known as "the crab".

He died of a drug overdose at age 29, in Los Angeles, California. He recorded one album, Introducing Carl Perkins, and a short series of singles under his own name. Authors Paul Tanner, Maurice Gerow, and David Megill cite Perkins as one of the best "funky", or hard bop, piano players, but his early death prevented him from leaving a legacy.

== Discography ==
=== As leader ===
- "Summertime" b/w "Lullaby in Rhythm" (Savoy, 1949) Single, with Edwin Perkins (b), Herb Williams (d)
- "The Rosary" b/w "Ave Maria" (Savoy, 1949) Single, with unknown bass and drums
- "Smoke Gets in Your Eyes" b/w "I'll Never Smile Again" (Savoy, 1949) Single, with unknown bass and drums
- Introducing Carl Perkins (Dootone, 1956) Perkins's only album as leader. With Leroy Vinnegar (b), Lawrence Marable (d)

=== Shared leadership ===
- Jazz Pianists Galore (Pacific, 1957) Perkins plays on one track
- Piano Playhouse (Mode, 1957) Perkins plays four solo tracks; others are by Jimmy Rowles, Lou Levy, Paul Smith, Gerald Wiggins

=== As sideman ===
With Pepper Adams

- Pepper Adams Quintet (Mode, 1957)

With Chet Baker and Art Pepper

- Playboys (Pacific Jazz, 1956)

With Clifford Brown and Max Roach

- The Best of Max Roach and Clifford Brown In Concert! (GNP, 1954)

With Curtis Counce

- The Curtis Counce Group (Contemporary, 1956)
- You Get More Bounce with Curtis Counce! (Contemporary, 1957)
- Carl's Blues (Contemporary, 1957)

With Buddy DeFranco

- Plays Benny Goodman (Verve, 1957)
- Wholly Cats (Verve, 1957)
- Closed Session (Verve, 1957)
- I Hear Benny Goodman and Artie Shaw (Verve, 1957)

With Victor Feldman

- Vic Feldman on Vibes (Mode, 1957)

With Dizzy Gillespie

- Jazz Recital (Norgran, 1955)

With Dexter Gordon

- Dexter Blows Hot and Cool (Dootone, 1955)

With Jim Hall

- Jazz Guitar (Pacific Jazz, 1957)

With Illinois Jacquet

- Collates (Clef, 1951)
- Illinois Jacquet and His Orchestra (Verve, 1956)

With Richie Kamuca

- Richie Kamuca Quartet (Mode, 1957)

With Harold Land

- Harold in the Land of Jazz originally titled as Grooveyard (Contemporary, 1958)

With Oscar Moore

- Oscar Moore Trio (Skylark, 1954)

With Frank Morgan

- Frank Morgan (Gene Norman Presents, 1955)

With Art Pepper

- The Complete Art Pepper Aladdin Recordings (Blue Note, 1957) The Perkins recordings were released long after recording

With Stuff Smith

- Have Violin, Will Swing (Verve, 1957)

With Leroy Vinnegar

- Leroy Walks! (Contemporary, 1958)
