= Collaboration West =

Studio album by Teddy Charles
- Released: 1956
- Recorded: December 23, 1952 and August 21 & 31, 1953; New York City and Los Angeles, California
- Genre: Jazz
- Length: 38:26
- Label: Prestige; PRLP 7028
- Producer: Bob Weinstock (tracks 1-6), Ira Gitler (tracks 7-10)

Teddy Charles chronology
New Directions (1952)	Collaboration West (1956)	Evolution (1955)

Collaboration West is an album by jazz vibraphonist and pianist Teddy Charles recorded in 1953 for the Prestige label. Four tracks from an earlier session were added to the 1993 CD release.

== Reception ==
Professional ratings
Review scores
Source	Rating
Allmusic	3/5 stars
The Penguin Guide to Jazz Recordings	3.5/4 stars

The Allmusic review by Scott Yanow states: "Although there are some swinging sections, much of the music is quite complex with difficult arrangements and some polytonality... The music is thought-provoking if a bit cold and clinical, easier to respect than to love".

== Track listing ==
All compositions by Teddy Charles except where noted.

1. "Variations on a Motive by Bud" – 4:20
2. "Wailing Dervish" (Shorty Rogers) – 4:31
3. "Further Out" – 5:42
4. "Etudiez le Cahier" – 3:48
5. "Margo" – 4:51
6. "Bobalob" – 7:01
7. "Edging Out" – 4:13 Bonus track on CD reissue
8. "Nocturne" – 2:52 Bonus track on CD reissue
9. "Composition for Four Pieces" (Jimmy Raney) – 1:35 Bonus track on CD reissue
10. "A Night in Tunisia" (Dizzy Gillespie, Frank Paparelli) – 6:44 Bonus track on CD reissue

Note

- Recorded in New York City on December 23, 1952 (tracks 7–10) and in Los Angeles, California on August 21, 1953 (tracks 1–4) and August 31, 1953 (tracks 5 & 6)

== Personnel ==
- Teddy Charles – vibraphone, piano
- Shorty Rogers – trumpet (tracks 1–6)
- Jimmy Raney – guitar (tracks 7–10)
- Curtis Counce (tracks 1–6), Dick Nivison (tracks 7–10) – bass
- Shelly Manne (tracks 1–6), Ed Shaughnessy (tracks 7–10) – drums
- Jimmy Giuffre – clarinet, tenor saxophone, baritone saxophone (tracks 5 & 6)
