= Bridgework (album) =

Studio album by Billy Higgins
- Released: 1986
- Recorded: January 4 & 5, 1980 and April 23, 1986; Los Angeles, CA and Fantasy Studios, Berkeley, CA
- Genre: Jazz
- Label: Contemporary; C 14024

Billy Higgins chronology
Mr. Billy Higgins (1984)	Bridgework (1986)	¾ for Peace (1993)

Bridgework is an album by American jazz drummer Billy Higgins recorded in 1980 and 1986 and released on the Contemporary label.

== Reception ==
Professional ratings
Review scores
Source	Rating
AllMusic	4/5 stars

The AllMusic review by Scott Yanow states "the music overall is excellent hard bop with some strong moments but no major surprises".

== Track listing ==
1. "Deceptakon" (Charles 'Buster' Williams)
2. "I Hear a Rhapsody" (George Fragos, Dick Gasparre, Jack Baker)
3. "Plexus (Cedar Walton)
4. "Evidence" (Thelonious Monk)
5. "Bridgework" (Walton)
6. "Old Folks" (Willard Robison, Dedette Lee Hill)
7. "The Theme" (Harold Land)

== Personnel ==
- Billy Higgins - drums
- James Clay (tracks 4–6), Harold Land (tracks 1–3 & 7) - tenor saxophone
- Cedar Walton - piano
- Tony Dumas (tracks 4–6), Buster Williams (tracks 1–3 & 7) - bass
