= The Peace-Maker =

Studio album by Harold Land
- Released: 1968
- Recorded: December 11, 1967 and February 26, 1968
- Studio: Annex Studios, Hollywood
- Genre: Jazz
- Length: 35:18
- Label: Cadet; LPS 813
- Producer: Richard L. Evans

Harold Land chronology
Jazz Impressions of Folk Music (1963)	The Peace-Maker (1968)	Now! (1970)

The Peace-Maker is an album by American saxophonist Harold Land recorded in late 1967 and early 1968 for the Cadet label.

== Reception ==
Professional ratings
Review scores
Source	Rating
AllMusic	4.5/5 stars
The Virgin Encyclopedia of Jazz	3/5 stars

AllMusic awarded the album 4½ stars calling it a "one of the finest if little-known jazz LPs of its era. The Peace-Maker is a particularly apt title. The record's serene, supple contours glow with a lyricism that eschews the angularity of bop."

== Track listing ==
All compositions by Harold Land except as indicated

No.	Title	Writer(s)	Length
1.	"The Peace-Maker"		5:09
2.	"Stylin'"		3:35
3.	"40 Love"		4:50
4.	"Angel Dance"		3:39
5.	"Timetable"		4:10
6.	"Imagine"	Francis Lai; Sammy Cahn	3:25
7.	"The Aquarian"		5:31
8.	"One for Nini"		4:59
Total length:			35:18

== Personnel ==
- Harold Land – tenor saxophone, flute
- Bobby Hutcherson – vibraphone
- Joe Sample – piano
- Buster Williams – bass
- Donald Bailey – drums, harmonica
