= Something Special (Hampton Hawes album) =

Live album by Hampton Hawes
- Released: 1994
- Recorded: June 10, 1976
- Venue: The Douglas Beach House, Half Moon Bay, California
- Genre: Jazz
- Length: 48:59
- Label: Contemporary CCD 14072-2
- Producer: Eric Miller

Hampton Hawes chronology
Live at the Jazz Showcase in Chicago Volume Two (1989)	Something Special (1994)	Bird Song (1999)

Something Special is a live album by American jazz pianist Hampton Hawes recorded in 1976 and released on the Contemporary label in 1994.

== Reception ==
The Allmusic review by Scott Yanow states "This excellent music gives no hints of Hawes' upcoming demise".

Professional ratings
Review scores
Source	Rating
Allmusic	4/5 stars
The Penguin Guide to Jazz Recordings	3/4 stars
Tom Hull	B+

== Track listing ==
All compositions by Hampton Hawes except as indicated

1. "BD & DS Blues" - 7:37
2. "Pablito" - 8:58
3. "Sunny" (Bobby Hebb) - 9:19
4. "Nice Meanderings" - 8:52
5. "St. Thomas" (Sonny Rollins) - 5:00
6. "Fly Me to the Moon" (Bart Howard) - 9:13

== Personnel ==
- Hampton Hawes - piano
- Denny Diaz - guitar
- Leroy Vinnegar - bass
- Al Williams - drums
