= Eastward Ho! Harold Land in New York =

Studio album by Harold Land
- Released: 1960
- Recorded: July 5 & 8, 1960; Plaza Sound Studios, New York City
- Genre: Jazz
- Label: Jazzland; JLP 33
- Producer: Orrin Keepnews

Harold Land chronology
West Coast Blues! (1960)	Eastward Ho! Harold Land in New York (1960)	Take Aim (1960)

Eastward Ho! Harold Land in New York is an album by American saxophonist Harold Land, recorded in late 1960 and released on the Jazzland label.

== Reception ==
Professional ratings
Review scores
Source	Rating
AllMusic	4/5 stars
The Penguin Guide to Jazz Recordings	2.5/4 stars
The Rolling Stone Jazz Record Guide	4/5 stars

AllMusic awarded the album 4 stars, calling it "a fine effort that serves as a strong example of Harold Land's early work". The Penguin Guide to Jazz Recordings comments that while Dorham and Land both play well, they don’t interact as well as they might have.

== Track listing ==
All compositions by Harold Land except as indicated

1. "So in Love" (Cole Porter) - 5:58
2. "Triple Trouble" (Amos Trice) - 5:46
3. "Slowly" (Kermit Goell, David Raksin) - 6:59
4. "'On a Little Street in Singapore" (Peter DeRose, Billy Hill) - 7:07
5. "Okay Blues" - 12:23

== Personnel ==
- Harold Land - tenor saxophone
- Kenny Dorham - trumpet
- Amos Trice - piano
- Clarence Jones - bass
- Joe Peters - drums
