= Larance Marable =

American jazz drummer (1929–2012)

- Born: May 21, 1929; Los Angeles
- Died: July 4, 2012 (aged 83)
- Occupation: jazz drummer

Larance Norman Marable (Note: Marable sometimes used 'Larry' or 'Lawrence' as his first name.) (May 21, 1929 – July 4, 2012) was a jazz drummer from Los Angeles, California.

== Later life and career ==
Marable was born in Los Angeles on May 21, 1929. His family was musical, but he was largely self-taught.

In the 1950s, Marable played with musicians who were visiting Los Angeles; these included Dexter Gordon, Charlie Parker, and Zoot Sims. Marable recorded as a leader in 1956. He also recorded with George Shearing, Chet Baker, Milt Jackson, and other well-known musicians.

Drug problems led to Marable stopping playing in the 1960s. His career resumed in the mid-1970s, after he had ended his drug addiction. He toured with Supersax and Bobby Hutcherson in the 1970s, and was a member of Charlie Haden's Quartet West in the 1980s and 1990s.

Marable had a stroke in the 2000s and lived in a health care facility. He died in Manhattan on July 4, 2012.

== Discography ==
With Curtis Amy

- Tippin' on Through (Pacific Jazz, 1962)

With Ruth Cameron

- Roadhouse (Verve, 1999)

With Chet Baker

- Chet Baker Big Band (Pacific Jazz, 1956)
- Playboys (Pacific Jazz, 1956)

With Conte Candoli and Lou Levy

- Conte Candoli (Powerhouse Trumpet) (Bethlehem, 1955)
- West Coast Wailers (Atlantic, 1955)

With Kenny Drew

- Kenny Drew and His Progressive Piano (Norgran, 1953–54)
- Talkin' & Walkin' (Jazz:West, 1955)

With Teddy Edwards

- Back to Avalon (Contemporary, 1960 [1995])

with Victor Feldman

- Stop the World I Want to Get Off (World Pacific, 1962)

With Dexter Gordon

- Daddy Plays the Horn (Bethlehem, 1955)
- The Resurgence of Dexter Gordon (Jazzland, 1960)

With Jimmy Giuffre

- Ad Lib (Verve, 1959)

With Charlie Haden

- In Angel City (Verve, 1988)
- Haunted Heart (Verve, 1991)
- Always Say Goodbye (Verve, 1993)
- Now Is the Hour (Verve, 1995)

With Hampton Hawes

- Piano East, Piano West (Prestige, 1952)
- Bird Song (Contemporary, 1956 [1999])

With Richard "Groove" Holmes

- After Hours (Pacific Jazz, 1962)
- Tell It Like It Tis (Pacific Jazz, 1961-62 [1966])

With Milt Jackson

- Ballads & Blues (Atlantic, 1956)

With Frank Morgan

- Frank Morgan (Gene Norman Presents, 1955)

With Carl Perkins

- Introducing Carl Perkins (Dootone, 1956)

With Robert Stewart

- The Movement (Exodus, 2002)

With Sonny Stitt

- Sonny Stitt Plays Jimmy Giuffre Arrangements (Verve, 1959)
