= The Curtis Counce Group =

Studio album by Curtis Counce
- Released: 1957
- Recorded: October 8 & 15, 1956; Los Angeles, California
- Genre: Jazz
- Length: 47:00
- Label: Contemporary C3526/S7526
- Producer: Lester Koenig

Curtis Counce chronology
The Curtis Counce Group (1957)	You Get More Bounce with Curtis Counce! (1957)

The Curtis Counce Group (later released as Landslide) is an album by American jazz bassist Curtis Counce recorded in 1956 and released on the Contemporary label.

== Reception ==
The Allmusic review by Scott Yanow states "All of Counce's recordings (which include a slightly later album for Dootone) are well worth getting by collectors interested in 1950s straight-ahead jazz. This disc is an excellent place to start".

Professional ratings
Review scores
Source	Rating
Allmusic	4.5/5 stars
Disc	5/5 stars
The Rolling Stone Jazz Record Guide	3/5 stars

== Track listing ==
1. "Landslide" (Harold Land) - 8:39
2. "Time After Time" (Sammy Cahn, Jule Styne) - 6:35
3. "Sonar" (Kenny Clarke, Gerald Wiggins) - 7:28
4. "Mia" (Carl Perkins) - 4:59
5. "Sarah" (Jack Sheldon) - 11:40
6. "A Fifth for Frank" (Wiggins, Cal Tjader) - 7:11

== Personnel ==
- Curtis Counce - bass
- Jack Sheldon - trumpet
- Harold Land - tenor saxophone
- Carl Perkins - piano
- Frank Butler - drums
