= Latinsville! =

Studio album by Victor Feldman
- Released: 1960
- Recorded: 2, 3 & 20 March; 4 May 1959
- Studio: Contemporary's Studio, Los Angeles, CA
- Genre: Jazz
- Label: Contemporary; M 5005 / S 9005
- Producer: Lester Koenig

Victor Feldman chronology
The Arrival of Victor Feldman (1958)	Latinsville! (1960)	Merry Olde Soul (1961)

Latinsville! is an album by vibraphonist and pianist Victor Feldman recorded in 1959 and released on the Contemporary label. The album was re-released on CD in 2003 containing with five previously unreleased tracks from an earlier session.

== Reception ==
Professional ratings
Review scores
Source	Rating
Allmusic	4/5 stars
The Penguin Guide to Jazz Recordings	3/4 stars

The Allmusic review by Matt Collar states: "Although artists such as vibist Cal Tjader and Dizzy Gillespie had been producing Afro-Cuban and Brazilian inflected jazz for a few years, the cross-pollination didn't really catch on until the '60s. Consequently, Latinsville, while in no way as influential as say, Getz/Gilberto, is nonetheless a forgotten gem". On All About Jazz Chris M. Slawecki observed: "As a soloist, Feldman whisks through his ending to 'Flying Down to Rio,' then his mid-song feature in 'Cuban Pete' swings very deeply in Bags’ (Milt Jackson's) bag. He also dances brilliantly against the amazingly timed percussion melody of 'Cuban Love Song.' But the musicianship of the other musicians—the percussionists and horn/brass soloists in particular, but also the bass and piano players—play as large a part in the excellence of this music as Feldman does".

== Track listing ==
1. "South of the Border" (Michael Carr, Jimmy Kennedy) – 3:19
2. "She's a Latin from Manhattan" (Harry Warren, Al Dubin) – 3:24 Spotify
3. "Flying Down to Rio" (Vincent Youmans, Edward Eliscu, Gus Kahn) – 2:59 Spotify
4. "Cuban Pete" (José Norman) – 2:51
5. "The Gypsy" (Billy Reid) – 3:12
6. "Poinciana" (Nat Simon, Buddy Bernier) – 3:38
7. "Lady of Spain" (Tolchard Evans, Stanley Damerell) – 3:30
8. "Spain" (Isham Jones, Kahn) – 3:00
9. "Cuban Love Song" (Herbert Stothart, Dorothy Fields, Jimmy McHugh) – 3:33
10. "In a Little Spanish Town" (Mabel Wayne, Sam M. Lewis, Joe Young) – 3:28
11. "Fiesta" (Victor Feldman) – 2:56
12. "Woody 'n You" (Dizzy Gillespie) – 3:30
13. "Poinciana" [earlier take] (Simon, Bernier) – 5:36 Bonus track on CD reissue
14. "Pancho" (Frank Rosolino) – 5:57 Bonus track on CD reissue
15. "The Breeze and I" (Ernesto Lecuona, Al Stillman) – 3:21 Bonus track on CD reissue
16. "Bullues Bullose" (Feldman) – 5:44 Bonus track on CD reissue
17. "Lady of Spain" [earlier take] (Evans, Damerell) – 5:56 Bonus track on CD reissue
- Recorded in Los Angeles, CA on 8 December 1958 (tracks 13–17), 2 March 1959 (tracks 6, 8, 9 & 12), 3 March 1959 (tracks 5 & 10), 20 March 1959 (tracks 1, 3 & 7) and 4 May 1959 (tracks 2, 4 & 11)

== Personnel ==
- Victor Feldman – vibraphone, piano
- Conte Candoli – trumpet (tracks 1, 3, 5–10 & 12)
- Frank Rosolino – trombone (tracks 6, 8, 9 & 12–17)
- Walter Benton – tenor saxophone (tracks 1, 3, 5–10 & 12–17)
- Andy Thomas (tracks 2, 4 & 11), Vince Guaraldi (tracks 1, 3, 5–10 & 12) – piano
- Scott LaFaro (tracks 5, 6, 8–10 & 12–17), Al McKibbon (tracks 1, 3 & 7), Tony Reyes (tracks 2, 4 & 11) – bass
- Nick Martinis (tracks 1, 3 & 14–17), Stan Levey (track 6, 8, 9 & 12) – drums
- Ramon Rivera (tracks 2, 4 & 11), Mongo Santamaria (tracks 1, 3, 5–10 & 12) – congas
- Armando Peraza – bongos (tracks 1, 3, 5–10 & 12)
- Willie Bobo (tracks 1, 3, 5–10 & 12), Frank Guerrero (tracks 2, 4 & 11) – timbales
