= Swing's the Thing (Illinois Jacquet album) =

Studio album by Illinois Jacquet
- Released: 1956
- Recorded: October 16, 1956
- Studio: Radio Recorders, Hollywood, CA
- Genre: Jazz
- Length: 34:16
- Label: Clef; MGC 750; VerveMGV8023
- Producer: Norman Granz

Illinois Jacquet chronology
Illinois Jacquet and His Orchestra (1955)	Swing's the Thing (1956)	Illinois Jacquet Flies Again (1959)

Swing's the Thing is an album by American jazz saxophonist Illinois Jacquet, recorded in late 1956 and released on the Clef label.

== Reception ==
Professional ratings
Review scores
Source	Rating
AllMusic	4/5 stars
The Penguin Guide to Jazz Recordings	3/4 stars

AllMusic reviewer Thom Jurek observed: "the magic is in the performances, so to speak with Jacquet, Roy Eldridge, Jo Jones, Herb Ellis, Jimmy Jones and Ray Brown in the party... This is essential Jacquet."

== Track listing ==
1. "Las Vegas Blues" (Roy Eldridge) - 6:17
2. "Harlem Nocturne" (Earle Hagen, Dick Rodgers) - 4:31
3. "Can't We Be Friends?" (Paul James, Kay Swift) - 6:42
4. "Achtung" (Illinois Jacquet) - 5:06
5. "Have You Met Miss Jones?" (Richard Rodgers, Lorenz Hart) - 5:56
6. "Lullaby of the Leaves" (Bernice Petkere, Joe Young) - 5:44

== Personnel ==
- Illinois Jacquet - tenor saxophone
- Roy Eldridge - trumpet
- Jimmy Jones - piano
- Herb Ellis - guitar
- Ray Brown - bass
- Jo Jones - drums
