= Jazz Impressions of Folk Music =

Studio album by Harold Land
- Released: 1963
- Recorded: July 3 & 17, 1963
- Studio: Radio Recorders, Los Angeles, CA
- Genre: Jazz
- Label: Imperial; LP 12247

Harold Land chronology
Hear Ye! (1961)	Jazz Impressions of Folk Music (1963)	The Peace-Maker (1968)

Jazz Impressions of Folk Music is an album recorded by American saxophonist Harold Land in 1963 for the Imperial label.

== Reception ==
Professional ratings
Review scores
Source	Rating
AllMusic	4/5 stars
The Virgin Encyclopedia of Jazz	3/5 stars

AllMusic awarded the album 4 stars stating "Released at the commercial apex of the folk revival, Jazz Impressions of Folk Music far transcends its cash-grab origins. Harold Land reinvents traditional favorites... And although Land's name sits above the title, Jazz Impressions of Folk Music is first and foremost a showcase for Jones, who turns in some of the most imaginative and vibrant work of his career".

== Track listing ==
All compositions by Traditional except as indicated

1. "Tom Dooley" - 6:56
2. "Scarlet Ribbons (Evelyn Danzig, Jack Segal) - 4:07
3. "Foggy, Foggy Dew" - 4:19
4. "Kisses Sweeter than Wine" - 3:52
5. "On Top of Old Smokey" - 2:57
6. "Take This Hammer" - 6:45
7. "Blue Tail Fly" - 3:45
8. "Hava Nagila" - 5:13

== Personnel ==
- Harold Land - tenor saxophone
- Carmell Jones - trumpet
- John Houston - piano
- Jimmy Bond - bass
- Mel Lee - drums
