= Givi Gachechiladze =

Georgian composer and conductor (born 1938)

- Born: 5 November 1938 (age 87); Tbilisi, Georgia
- Genres: Soundtrack Classical music Jazz
- Occupation: Composer Conductor
- Instruments: Piano, keyboard

Givi Gachechiladze (born November 5, 1938) is a Georgian composer and conductor, currently the leader of the Tbilisi Municipal Orchestra. Givi Gachechiladze first gained public attention with an instrumental composition called "Vic" which was included in Victor Feldman's Soviet Jazz Themes (Äva, 1962), the world's first album of Soviet jazz released in the US and abroad in 1963.

Later, Givi Gachechiladze led the Ukrainian Jazz Orchestra as well as the Pop/Symphony Orchestra of Ukrainian National Television (Kiev-Channel One). After returning to Georgia, he was the leader of the Tbilisi Philharmonic, the composer, conductor and musical director of Rero, the Tbilisi Television Orchestra, Theatron, and Mardzhanishvili Theater. In 1997, he founded the Tbilisi Municipal Orchestra, which brought the band leader even more recognition. Today the orchestra, also known as the Tbilisi Big Band or the Tbilisi Concert Orchestra, is one of the most highly sought orchestras in the post-Soviet region. In 2006, the Tbilisi Municipal Orchestra, Givi Gachechiladze's direction, won the Monte-Carlo International Jazz Awards of 2006.

Gachechiladze is the author of hundreds of jazz and classical compositions, as well as soundtracks for films and plays.

== Filmography ==
- 2001 Khveuli kibit
- 1989 Cha
- 1988 Khdeba kholme... (TV Movie)
- 1987 Bravo, Alber Lolish
