= Summer Soft =

Studio album by Blue Mitchell
- Released: February 22, 1978
- Recorded: 1977
- Genre: Jazz
- Length: 40:23
- Label: Impulse!
- Producer: Esmond Edwards

Blue Mitchell chronology
Stablemates (1977)	Summer Soft (1978)

Summer Soft is an album by American trumpeter Blue Mitchell, recorded in 1977 and released on the Impulse! label in 1978. It was his final album.

== Reception ==
In a review for AllMusic, Scott Yanow wrote: "Although there are some fine players on this LP they are largely wasted on inferior material and commercial arrangements".

Professional ratings
Review scores
Source	Rating
AllMusic	2/5 stars

== Track listing ==
1. "Try Not to Forget" (Cedar Walton) – 7:20
2. "Summer Soft" (Stevie Wonder) – 5:55
3. " A Day at the Mint" (Blue Mitchell) – 6:15
4. "Love Has Made Me a Dreamer" (Mike Dosco, Esmond Edwards) – 4:30
5. "Evergreen" (Barbra Streisand, Paul Williams) – 4:37
6. "30 Degrees to the Wind" (Cedar Walton, Susan Brickell) – 5:53
7. "Funkthesizer" (Eddie Harris) – 5:33

- Recorded in ABC Recording Studios, Los Angeles, California in 1977.

== Personnel ==
- Blue Mitchell – trumpet (tracks 1 & 3–7), flugelhorn (track 2), vocals (track 7)
- Eddie Harris (track 7), Harold Land (tracks 1, 2 & 6), Herman Riley (track 3) – tenor saxophone
- Cedar Walton – piano (tracks 1, 2 & 6), electric piano (track 3)
- Bobby Lyle – electric piano (track 2), piano (tracks 5 & 7)
- Richard Tee – keyboard (track 4)
- Michael Boddicker – synthesizer (tracks 1, 2, 5 & 6)
- Mike Dosco, Lee Ritenour (track 4) – guitar
- Scott Edwards – bass
- James Gadson – drums
- Paulinho Da Costa – percussion
- Julia Tillman Waters, Luther Waters, Maxine Waters Willard, Oren Waters – vocals (tracks 2, 4, 6 & 7)
