= Illinois Jacquet and His Orchestra =

1956 album

Studio album by Illinois Jacquet
- Released: 1956
- Recorded: November 3, 1955; Radio Recorders, Hollywood, CA
- Genre: Jazz
- Length: 37:20
- Label: Clef; MGC 676
- Producer: Norman Granz

Illinois Jacquet chronology
The Kid and the Brute (1954)	Illinois Jacquet and His Orchestra (1956)	Swing's the Thing (1956)

Illinois Jacquet and His Orchestra (also released as Groovin' with Jacquet) is an album by American jazz saxophonist Illinois Jacquet recorded in 1955 and originally released on the Clef label.

== Reception ==
Professional ratings
Review scores
Source	Rating
Allmusic	3/5 stars

Allmusic awarded the album 3 stars.

== Track listing ==
All compositions by Illinois Jacquet and Harry Edison, except as indicated.

1. "Honeysuckle Rose" (Fats Waller, Andy Razaf) - 6:48
2. "Cool Bill" - 5:50
3. "Learnin' the Blues" (Dolores "Vicki" Silvers) - 2:41
4. "Stardust" (Hoagy Carmichael, Mitchell Parish) - 3:45
5. "Love Is Here to Stay" (George Gershwin, Ira Gershwin) - 4:31
6. "Empathy" - 4:46
7. "East of the Sun (and West of the Moon)" (Brooks Bowman) - 4:45
8. "Sophia" - 4:14

== Personnel ==
- Illinois Jacquet - tenor saxophone
- Harry Edison - trumpet
- Carl Perkins - piano (tracks 1 & 3–8)
- Gerald Wiggins - organ (tracks 1–3 & 5–8)
- Irving Ashby - guitar
- Curtis Counce - bass
- Al Bartee - drums
