= Frank Butler (musician) =

American jazz drummer (1928–1984)

Background information
- Born: February 18, 1928; Kansas City, Missouri, U.S.
- Died: July 24, 1984 (aged 56) Ventura, California, U.S.
- Genres: Jazz
- Instrument: Drums

Frank Butler (February 18, 1928 – July 24, 1984) was an American jazz drummer.

== Early life ==
Butler was born in Kansas City, Missouri, but later moved west and was associated in large part with the West Coast school. He played the drums in multiple high school bands (including one in Omaha, Nebraska), in local jazz combos, and in USO shows during World War II.

== Career ==
Butler never became well known, but was highly regarded by fellow musicians (in 1958, veteran drummer Jo Jones proclaimed him "the greatest drummer in the world") and performed with numerous jazz notables. Early in his career he played with the Dave Brubeck combo at a 1950 engagement in San Francisco, before Brubeck's group gained a national following in the mid-1950s. He went on to perform and record with Duke Ellington, John Coltrane, Miles Davis, Ben Webster, Harold Land, Hampton Hawes and Art Pepper in the 1950s and 1960s. He performed on several television series, including Stars of Jazz with bassist Curtis Counce. The Contemporary label noticed Butler and Counce, and, from 1956 through 1958, captured them together on several Curtis Counce Quintet albums. Sidelined for many years by an addiction to heroin, Butler did not record albums under his own name until the 1970s, when he released two highly regarded albums titled Wheelin' and Dealin' and The Stepper.

== Death ==
After a short illness, Butler died of lung cancer in Ventura, California the age of 56.

== Discography ==
=== As leader ===
- The Stepper (Xanadu, 1977)
- Wheelin' and Dealin' (Xanadu, 1978)

=== As co-leader ===
Co-led with Curtis Amy

- Groovin' Blue (Pacific Jazz, 1961)

=== As sideman ===
With Dolo Coker

- Dolo! (Xanadu, 1976)
- California Hard (Xanadu, 1976)
- Third Down (Xanadu, 1977)

With Joyce Collins

- Girl Here Plays Mean Piano (Jazzland, 1961)

With John Coltrane

- Kulu Sé Mama (Impulse, 1967)

With Curtis Counce

- The Curtis Counce Group (Contemporary, 1956)
- You Get More Bounce with Curtis Counce! (Contemporary, 1957)
- Carl's Blues (Contemporary, 1957)
- Sonority (Contemporary, 1957-8 [1989])
- Exploring the Future (Dooto, 1958)

With Miles Davis

- Seven Steps to Heaven (Columbia, 1963)

With Kenny Drew

- Home Is Where the Soul Is (Xanadu, 1978)
- For Sure! (Xanadu, 1978)

With Teddy Edwards

- Feelin's (Muse, 1974)

With Victor Feldman

- Soviet Jazz Themes (Äva, 1962)

With Red Garland

- Red Alert (Galaxy, 1977)

With Hampton Hawes

- For Real! (Contemporary, 1958 [1961])
- Bird Song (Contemporary, 1958 [1999])

With Elmo Hope

- The Elmo Hope Quintet featuring Harold Land (Pacific Jazz, 1957)
- Elmo Hope Trio (Hifijazz, 1959)

With Helen Humes

- Helen Humes (Contemporary, 1960)
- Swingin' with Humes (Contemporary, 1961)

With Fred Katz

- Fred Katz and his Jammers (Decca, 1959)

With Harold Land

- Harold in the Land of Jazz (Contemporary, 1958)
- The Fox (Hifijazz, 1959)

With Big Miller

- Revelations and the Blues (Columbia, 1961)

With Red Mitchell

- Rejoice! (Pacific Jazz, 1961)

With Paul Moer

- The Contemporary Jazz Classics of the Paul Moer Trio (Del-Fi, 1959)

With Phineas Newborn

- The Newborn Touch (Contemporary, 1964)

With Art Pepper

- Smack Up (Contemporary, 1960)
- Intensity (Contemporary, 1960)
- Among Friends (Interplay, 1978)

With Ben Webster

- Ben Webster at the Renaissance (Contemporary, 1960 [1985])

With Gerald Wilson

- Everywhere (Pacific Jazz, 1968)

With Jimmy Witherspoon

- In Blues (Society, 1964)

With Xanadu All Stars

- Xanadu in Africa (Xanadu, 1980) with Al Cohn, Billy Mitchell and Leroy Vinnegar
- Night Flight to Dakar (Xanadu, 1980) with Al Cohn, Billy Mitchell and Leroy Vinnegar
