= The Arrival of Victor Feldman =

Studio album by Victor Feldman
- Released: 1958
- Recorded: January 21 & 22, 1958
- Studio: Contemporary's Studio, Los Angeles, CA
- Genre: Jazz
- Length: 41:31
- Label: Contemporary C 3549
- Producer: Lester Koenig

Victor Feldman chronology
Vic Feldman on Vibes (1957)	The Arrival of Victor Feldman (1958)	Latinsville! (1959)

The Arrival of Victor Feldman is an album by vibraphonist and pianist Victor Feldman recorded in 1958 and released on the Contemporary label.

== Reception ==
Professional ratings
Review scores
Source	Rating
Allmusic	2.5/5 stars
The Penguin Guide to Jazz Recordings	4/4 stars

The Allmusic review by Scott Yanow states: "For his second American release and debut for the Contemporary label, Feldman is completely in the spotlight. Joined by the brilliant bassist Scott La Faro (whose playing is a strong reason to acquire the album) and drummer Stan Levey, Feldman performs a mostly boppish set ". On All About Jazz Samuel Chell observed "Feldman's piano is not as developed as his vibes work at this early stage in his career, so there's lots of space (and solo room) for LaFaro's majestic sound and unstoppable drive. In fact, it's probably no exaggeration to say the date is as much LaFaro's as Feldman's. The latter makes a favorable impression; but the former puts on a clinic. Not to be missed by any acoustic bassist or admirer".

== Track listing ==
All compositions by Victor Feldman except where noted.

1. "Serpent's Tooth" (Miles Davis) – 3:28
2. "Waltz" (Frédéric Chopin) – 5:30
3. "Chasing Shadows" – 3:58
4. "Flamingo" (Ted Grouya, Edmund Anderson) – 3:18
5. "S'posin'" (Paul Denniker, Andy Razaf) – 4:29
6. "Bebop" (Dizzy Gillespie) – 2:46
7. "There Is No Greater Love" (Isham Jones, Marty Symes) – 4:24
8. "Too Blue" – 4:13
9. "Minor Lament" – 4:00
10. "Satin Doll" (Duke Ellington, Billy Strayhorn, Johnny Mercer) – 5:59

== Personnel ==
- Victor Feldman – vibraphone, piano
- Scott LaFaro – bass
- Stan Levey – drums
