= The Fox (Harold Land album) =

Studio album by Harold Land
- Released: 1960
- Recorded: August 1959
- Genre: Jazz, hard bop
- Length: 36:49
- Label: Hifijazz; reissued by Contemporary
- Producer: David Axelrod

Harold Land chronology
Harold in the Land of Jazz (1958)	The Fox (1960)	West Coast Blues! (1960)

The Fox is a 1960 album by Harold Land, originally released on the Hifijazz label and reissued by Contemporary in 1969 and on CD by Original Jazz Classics in 1991. The album features trumpeter Dupree Bolton.

== Reception ==
Professional ratings
Review scores
Source	Rating
AllMusic	4.5/5 stars
DownBeat	4.5/5 stars
Tom Hull	B+
The Penguin Guide to Jazz	3.5/4 stars
The Rolling Stone Jazz Record Guide	4/5 stars
The Virgin Encyclopedia of Jazz	2/5 stars

AllMusic's Scott Yanow described the album as an "excellent straight-ahead quintet set" and "high-quality hard bop". The Penguin Guide to Jazz rates the album three and a half stars and describes Land as an "underrated composer with a deep feeling for the blues" and states that The Fox, "tricky and fugitive as much of it is, must be thought his finest moment".

== Track listing ==
1. "The Fox" (Land) 5:36
2. "Mirror Mind Rose" (Hope) 6:32
3. "One Second, Please" (Hope) 5:51
4. "Sims A-Plenty" (Hope) 6:17
5. "Little Chris" (Land) 5:10
6. "One Down" (Hope) 7:23

== Personnel ==
- Harold Land - tenor saxophone
- Dupree Bolton - trumpet
- Elmo Hope - piano
- Herbie Lewis - bass
- Frank Butler - drums

== See also ==
- Harold Land discography
