= Bird Song (Hampton Hawes album) =

Studio album by Hampton Hawes
- Released: 1999
- Recorded: January 18, 1956; March 17, 1958
- Studio: Contemporary (Los Angeles)
- Genre: Jazz
- Length: 55:22
- Label: Contemporary OJCCD 1035-2
- Producer: Lester Koenig

Hampton Hawes chronology
For Real! (1994)	Bird Song (1999)	Trio and Quartet 1951-1956 Live and Studio Sessions (2005)

Bird Song is an album by American jazz pianist Hampton Hawes recorded at sessions in 1956 and 1958 but not released on the Contemporary label until 1999.

== Reception ==
Professional ratings
Review scores
Source	Rating
Allmusic	4/5 stars
The Penguin Guide to Jazz Recordings	3/4 stars

The Allmusic review by Jim Todd states "It's a mystery why these tracks from 1956 and 1958 went unreleased until 1999. They come from a key creative period in Hawes' career when he was enjoying new levels of commercial and critical acclaim. Regardless, the music has now been done justice in a well-mastered release that will please fans of Hawes and of bop piano in general". On All About Jazz, Derek Taylor observed "Hawes’ trio recordings of the 50s are among the finest examples of small ensemble hard bop created on California shores. With these new discoveries not only is his discography bolstered, but listeners are also given another window into his art at a time when it was at its zenith. This disc is valuable document and should be consulted by anyone who appreciates resourceful and resonant piano trio jazz".

Doug Ramsey wrote, "These trios may not have quite the magnetic cogency of Hawes' working group with Red Mitchell and Chuck Thompson, but there is more than enough brilliance here to satisfy listeners who recognize Hawes as one of the finest of the pianists who grew out of Bud Powell".

== Track listing ==
1. "Big Foot" (Charlie Parker) - 5:36
2. "Ray's Idea" (Ray Brown, Gil Fuller) - 4:42
3. "Stella by Starlight" (Victor Young, Ned Washington) - 4:38
4. "Blues for Jacque" (Hampton Hawes) - 4:52
5. "I Should Care" (Sammy Cahn, Axel Stordahl, Paul Weston) - 4:41
6. "Bird Song" (Thad Jones) - 4:05
7. "Yesterdays" (Jerome Kern, Otto Harbach) - 5:29
8. "What's New?" (Bob Haggart, Johnny Burke) - 5:29
9. "Just One of Those Things" (Cole Porter) - 3:15
10. "I'll Remember April" (Gene de Paul, Patricia Johnston, Don Raye) - 5:26
11. "Cheryl" (Parker) - 3:46
12. "Blue 'n' Boogie" (Dizzy Gillespie, Frank Paparelli) - 3:23
- Recorded at Contemporary Records Studio in Los Angeles on January 18, 1956 (tracks 1–7, 9–11) and March 17, 1958 (tracks 8 & 12)

== Personnel ==
- Hampton Hawes – piano
- Paul Chambers (tracks 1–7, 9 & 11) and Scott LaFaro (tracks 8, 10 & 12) – bass
- Larance Marable (tracks 1–7, 9 & 11) and Frank Butler (tracks 8, 10 & 12) – drums
