= Wheelin' and Dealin' (Frank Butler album) =

Studio album by Frank Butler
- Released: 1978
- Recorded: October 22, 1978, Los Angeles CA
- Genre: Jazz
- Label: Xanadu; 169
- Producer: Don Schlitten

Frank Butler chronology
The Stepper (1977)	Wheelin' and Dealin' (1978)

Wheelin' and Dealin' is an album by drummer Frank Butler which was recorded in 1978 and released on the Xanadu label.

== Reception ==
Professional ratings
Review scores
Source	Rating
AllMusic	4.5/5 stars

The AllMusic review by Scott Yanow stated: "Missing are the longer drum solos of the earlier album; instead the focus is primarily on the two saxes... it will especially appeal to lovers of hard bop".

== Track listing ==
1. "Wheelin' and Dealin'" (Teddy Edwards) - 6:21
2. "I Got It Bad (and That Ain't Good)/Tenderly" (Duke Ellington, Paul Francis Webster/Walter Gross, Jack Lawrence) - 8:14
3. "Four" (Miles Davis) - 7:29
4. "Secret Love" (Sammy Fain, Paul Francis Webster) - 5:40
5. "My Cherie Amour" (Stevie Wonder, Henry Cosby, Sylvia Moy) - 6:40
6. "Mr. October" (Dolo Coker) - 6:55

== Personnel ==
- Frank Butler - drums
- Teddy Edwards, Joe Farrell - tenor saxophone
- Dolo Coker - piano
- Monty Budwig - bass
