= A Lazy Afternoon (Harold Land album) =

Studio album by Harold Land
- Released: 1995
- Recorded: December 28–31, 1994
- Genre: Jazz
- Length: 45:39
- Label: Postcards Records; POST 1008
- Producer: Ralph Simon

Harold Land chronology
Xocia's Dance (1981)	A Lazy Afternoon (1995)	Promised Land (2001)

A Lazy Afternoon is a studio album by American hard bop tenor saxophonist Harold Land. The album was recorded in Hollywood and released in 1995 via Postcards Records label.

== Reception ==
Professional ratings
Review scores
Source	Rating
AllMusic	4.5/5 stars
The Virgin Encyclopedia of Jazz	4/5 stars

Scott Yanow of AllMusic wrote: "Harold Land, a long underrated tenor giant based in Los Angeles, is quite melodic yet subtly explorative on his surprising disc. Backed by a string orchestra arranged and conducted by Ray Ellis and a rhythm section led by pianist Bill Henderson, Land explores dozen standards that are highlighted by 'Nature Boy', 'Invitation' and 'You've Changed'. He treats the melodies with respect and taste yet is not shy to stretch the music when called for. Harold Land plays beautifully throughout this memorable release."

Jim Macnie of Billboard noted: "Harold Land glides through Ray Ellis' orchestral charts, rhapsodizing forlorn and alluding to noirish days gone by. His Lester Young part comes to the fore here."

Willard Jenkins of JazzTimes stated: "Why didn't someone think of this before?... timeless pieces, beautifully rendered... if you are a seeker of beauty, Harold Land has the answer."

== Track listing ==
No.	Title	Writer(s)	Length
1.	"Lazy Afternoon"	John Latouche, Jerome Moross	4:23
2.	"You Don't Know What Love Is"	Gene DePaul, Don Raye	3:45
3.	"In a Sentimental Mood"	Duke Ellington, Manny Kurtz, Irving Mills	4:25
4.	"Nature Boy"	Eden Ahbez	3:47
5.	"You Go to My Head"	J. Fred Coots, Haven Gillespie	4:05
6.	"But Beautiful"	Johnny Burke, James Van Heusen	3:06
7.	"Invitation"	Bronislaw Kaper, Paul Francis Webster	4:57
8.	"Stella by Starlight"	Ned Washington, Victor Young	2:52
9.	"The End of a Love Affair"	Edward Redding	3:54
10.	"You've Changed"	Bill Carey, Carl Fischer	3:22
11.	"Wave"	Antônio Carlos Jobim	3:19
12.	"'Round Midnight"	Bernie Hanighen, Thelonious Monk, Cootie Williams	3:44
Total length:			45:39

== Personnel ==
- Harold Land – tenor saxophone
- Billy Higgins – drums
- Bill Henderson – piano
- James Leary – bass
- Ray Ellis – arranging, conducting
