= Damisi =

Studio album by Harold Land
- Released: 1972
- Recorded: 1972; Los Angeles, CA
- Genre: Jazz
- Length: 54:42
- Label: Mainstream; MRL 367
- Producer: Bob Shad

Harold Land chronology
Choma (Burn) (1971)	Damisi (1972)	Mapenzi (1977)

Damisi is an album recorded by American saxophonist Harold Land in 1972 for the Mainstream label. In Swahili damisi means "cheerful".

== Reception ==
Professional ratings
Review scores
Source	Rating
AllMusic	3/5 stars
Tom Hull	B+

AllMusic awarded the album 3 stars stating "The modal music, which clearly shows the influences of early fusion and funk, is interesting but very much of its period".

== Track listing ==
All compositions by Harold Land except as indicated

1. "Step Right Up to the Bottom" - 4:40
2. "In the Back, in the Corner, in the Dark" - 5:48
3. "Pakistan" - 7:58
4. "Chocolate Mess" (Ndugu Chancler) - 7:31
5. "Damisi" - 9:08
6. "Dark Mood" - 8:48 Bonus track on CD reissue, taken from Choma (Burn)
7. "Up and Down" - 10:49 Bonus track on CD reissue, taken from the Mainstream LP Jazz, a sampler featuring various artists

== Personnel ==
- Harold Land – tenor saxophone, oboe
- Oscar Brashear – trumpet, flugelhorn
- William Henderson – piano, electric piano
- Buster Williams – bass, electric bass
- Ndugu Chancler – drums
