= Jack Sheldon =

American trumpeter, singer, and actor (1931–2019)

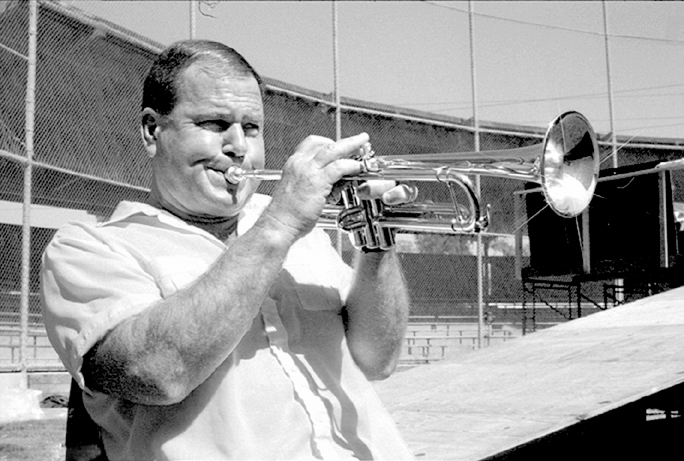
- Sheldon at the Palo Alto Jazz Festival, September 26, 1987

Background information
- Born: Beryl Cyril Sheldon Jr. November 30, 1931; Jacksonville, Florida, U.S.
- Died: December 27, 2019 (aged 88) Los Angeles, California, U.S.
- Genre: Jazz
- Occupations: Musician, actor
- Instruments: Trumpet, vocals

Beryl Cyril "Jack" Sheldon Jr. (November 30, 1931 – December 27, 2019) was an American jazz trumpeter, singer, and actor. He performed on The Merv Griffin Show and participated in episodes of the educational music television series Schoolhouse Rock!, most notably "Conjunction Junction" and "I'm Just a Bill".

== Biography ==
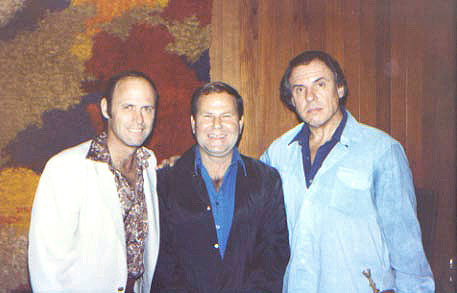
Bubba Kolb, Jack Sheldon (center), and Ira Sullivan, Village Jazz Lounge, Walt Disney World, c. 1980s

=== Music and TV ===
Sheldon was born in Jacksonville, Florida. He originally became known through his participation in the West Coast jazz movement of the 1950s, performing and recording with such figures as Stan Kenton, Art Pepper, Gerry Mulligan, and Curtis Counce. Sheldon played the trumpet, sang, and performed on The Merv Griffin Show. He was Griffin's sidekick for many years. Prior to joining Griffin's show, he served as bandleader for the short-lived The Las Vegas Show.

His voice is perhaps best known from the Schoolhouse Rock! cartoons of the 1970s, such as "Conjunction Junction" and "I'm Just a Bill" (where his son John voiced the role of the boy who learns from the bill). He appeared in two episodes of Johnny Bravo as the Sensitive Man. He sang a few songs in the episodes similar to the Schoolhouse Rock! style. Sheldon returned to the Schoolhouse Rock! series for a 2002 episode titled "I'm Gonna Send Your Vote to College", explaining the electoral college process, distributed on the series' DVD collection that same year. Sheldon sang and played trumpet for the new segment.

Sheldon voiced "Louie the Lightning Bug" in a series of animated musical public service announcements (animated by Bob Kurtz from his Kurtz & Friends studio) aimed at children across the United States and Canada, beginning in May 1984, promoting safety with electricity. In 2001, the "Louie the Lightning Bug" videos were updated with new voice-overs by Sheldon and new music tracks produced by Mark Harrelson, with updated musical arrangements by Ray Reach.

He sang the tune "King Putt" for The World According to Goofy Parade at Disneyland, which ran for five months in 1992. A trumpet solo of his is featured throughout the Francis Ford Coppola film One from the Heart (1982). Tom Waits' 1977 album Foreign Affairs includes Sheldon playing trumpet on several cuts, including the solo at the end of "Burma Shave".

Sheldon starred with Cara Williams and Frank Aletter on the CBS situation comedy The Cara Williams Show in 1964–1965. From 1966 to 1967, Sheldon starred in his own 16-episode CBS sitcom, Run, Buddy, Run, as Buddy Overstreet, a young accountant taking a steam bath who, overhearing a mobster's plot to kill a colleague, then goes on the run to keep from being killed. Bruce Gordon, formerly of The Untouchables, played the mobster, "Mr. D". Sheldon made numerous appearances on the 1967–1970 version of Dragnet. He also played John Davidson's brother (and Sally Field's brother-in-law) on The Girl with Something Extra (1974). In 2004, he performed live at the end of ALF's Hit Talk Show.

=== Film ===
Sheldon appeared in an Oscar-nominated documentary film Let's Get Lost about the life of fellow jazz trumpeter Chet Baker. He made an appearance in the 1994 film Radioland Murders as the ill-fated trumpet player Ruffles Reedy, who becomes a victim of the gruesome goings-on during a 1939 radio show.

Jack's poignant trumpet solo on "The Shadow of Your Smile" which was introduced in the 1965 film The Sandpiper helped earn it Song of the Year at the 1966 Grammy Awards and Best Original Song at the 1965 Academy Awards.

Sheldon performed one of the many versions of the title song featured in Robert Altman's 1973 film The Long Goodbye. His version was intended to be released as a single, but never was.

Sheldon is the subject of a documentary, Trying to Get Good: the Jazz Odyssey of Jack Sheldon (2008). Produced by Doug McIntyre and Penny Peyser, the film features interviews with Clint Eastwood, Billy Crystal, Merv Griffin, Chris Botti, Dave Frishberg, Johnny Mandel, Tierney Sutton, as well as never before seen concert footage of Sheldon playing, singing and joking. Trying to Get Good won Jury Prizes at the 2008 Kansas City Film Makers Jubilee and Newport Beach Film Festival, as well as Audience Prizes at Newport Beach and the Indianapolis International Film Festival.

=== Parody ===
Sheldon parodied his own performance in "I'm Just a Bill" in an episode of The Simpsons called "The Day the Violence Died", where he is an "amendment to be". He reprised his roles as the Bill and the Conductor from "Conjunction Junction" in two episodes of Family Guy.

== Death ==
Sheldon died of natural causes on December 27, 2019, at the age of 88. He was preceded in death by daughter, Julie and son, Kevin. He was survived by his children Jessie and John, numerous grandchildren and great grandchildren.

== Discography ==
=== As leader ===
- 1954 - Get Out Of Town (Jazz West, 1955) [10'' Lp]
- 1955 - The Quintet With Zoot Sims (Jazz West, 1956) [10'' Lp]
- 1954-55 - The two previous 10'' Lp reissued as The Quartet and The Quintet (Pacific Jazz)
- 1957 - Jack's Groove (GNP Crescendo, 1958–61) (Aka J S And His All Star Band)
- 1961 - A Jazz Profile of Ray Charles (Reprise, 1961)
- 1962 - Out! (Capitol, 1962)
- 1962-64 - Oooo, But it's Good (Capitol, 1963)
- 1964-65 - The Entertainers (V.S.O.P., 1994)
- 1965 - Live at Don Mupo's Gold Nugget (V.S.O.P., 1997)
- 1968 - The Warm World of Jack Sheldon (Dot, 1968)
- 1969 - The Cool World of Jack Sheldon (Dot, 1969)
- 1972 - In Perfect Harmony: The Lost Album (Jazz Detective, 2024)
- 1979 - Singular (Beez, 1980)
- 1980 - Angel Wings (Dan/Tokuma, ?)
- 1980 - Playin' It Straight (RealTime, 1981)
- 1983 - Stand By for The Jack Sheldon Quartet (Concord Jazz, 1983)
- 1984 - Blues In The Night (Phontastic, 1985) Jack Sheldon And The Swedish All Stars In L. A
- 1986 - Playing for Change (Uptown, 1997)
- 1987 - Hollywood Heroes (Concord Jazz, 1988)
- 1991 - On My Own (Concord Jazz, 1992)
- 1992 - Jack Sheldon Sings (Butterfly, 1993)
- 1995 - Jack is Back! (Butterfly, 1995)
- 1998 - Class Act (Butterfly, 1998)
- 1999 - JSO Live! On the Pacific Ocean (Butterfly, 2001)
- 2005 - Sunday Afternoons at the Lighthouse (Woofy, 2005)
- 2006 - Listen Up (Butterfly, 2006)
- 2007 - It's What I Do (Butterfly, 2007)

=== As guest ===
With Curtis Counce

- The Curtis Counce Group (Contemporary, 1956)
- You Get More Bounce with Curtis Counce! (Contemporary, 1957)
- Carl's Blues (Contemporary, 1957)
- Sonority (Contemporary, 1957–8 [1989])

With Jimmy Giuffre

- Jimmy Giuffre (Capitol, 1955)
- Tangents in Jazz (Capitol, 1956)
- The Jimmy Giuffre Clarinet (Atlantic, 1956)

With Stan Kenton

- The Stage Door Swings (Capitol, 1958)
- Kenton Live from the Las Vegas Tropicana (Capitol, 1959 [1961])
- Hair (Capitol, 1969)

With Tom Waits

- Foreign Affairs (Asylum, 1977)
- One from the Heart (Columbia, 1982)

With others

- VV. AA., A Jazz Band Ball First Set (Mode, 1959)
- Lena Horne, Lena...Lovely and Alive (RCA, 1962)
- Johnny Mandel "The Sandpiper" Musical score and soundtrack (Filmways, Mercury Records, 1965)
- Johnny Mandel, I Want to Live (United Artists, 1958)
- Herbie Mann, Great Ideas of Western Mann (Riverside, 1957)
- Shelly Manne, My Fair Lady with the Un-original Cast (Capitol, 1964)
- The Monkees, The Birds, the Bees & the Monkees (Colgems, 1968)
- Frank Morgan, Frank Morgan (Gene Norman Presents, 1955)
- Anita O'Day, Cool Heat (Verve, 1959)
- Art Pepper, The Return of Art Pepper (Jazz: West, 1956)
- Art Pepper, Smack Up (Contemporary, 1960)
- André Previn, The Subterraneans (Soundtrack) (MGM, 1960)
- Pete Rugolo, Behind Brigitte Bardot (Warner Bros., 1960)
- Sonny Stitt, Sonny Stitt Plays Jimmy Giuffre Arrangements (Verve, 1959)

== Filmography ==
- 1962 : Music of the 60's : 3rd trumpet and featured soloist on several tunes
- 1964–65 : The Cara Williams Show (TV) : Fletcher Kincaid (15 episodes)
- 1965: "The Sandpiper" Music by Johnny Mandel: featured trumpet soloist
- 1966–1967 : Run, Buddy, Run (TV) : Buddy Overstreet (series star – all 16 episodes)
- 1967 : Dragnet (TV) : Various Characters (unknown episodes)
- 1969 : Under the Yum Yum Tree (TV) : Charlie Prokter
- 1969–1970 : Petticoat Junction (TV) : Freddie Kirby, Ronald "Ronnie" Coleman (episodes: The Organ Fund, Selma Plout's Plot)
- 1973–2009 : Schoolhouse Rock! (TV series) : Conductor/The Bill/Additional Voices (voice)
- 1973–1974 : The Girl with Something Extra (TV series) : Jerry Burton (12 episodes)
- 1973 : The Long Goodbye (film) : Vocals, probably trumpet on title song
- 1976 : Freaky Friday : Lloyd
- 1984 : Cassevetes Love Streams: Almost in Love with You : Vocal and Trumpet
- 1988 : Star Trek: The Next Generation (TV) : Holodeck Pianist (11001001)
- 1988 : Let's Get Lost : Himself
- 1991 : For the Boys : Wally Fields
- 1993 : Lush Life (TV) : Norman
- 1994 : Radioland Murders : Ruffles Reed
- 1996 : Dear God : Homeless Trumpeter
- 1996 : The Simpsons (TV series) : The Amendment (voice) (episode: The Day the Violence Died)
- 1997 : Johnny Bravo (TV series) (voice)
- 1998 : Hard Time (TV) : Trumpet
- 1998 : Mike Hammer (TV) episode(s) "Songbird" parts 1-2 Co-starred w/Keach as "Des" Bandleader/Trumpet player/ Singer.
- 1999 : Hard Time: The Premonition (TV) : Trumpet
- 1999 : Hard Time: Hostage Hotel (TV) : Trumpet
- 2000–2001 : Family Guy (TV series) : Conductor/The Bill (voice) (episodes: Running Mates, Mr. Griffin Goes to Washington)
- 2004 : Teacher's Pet : Vocals on Song- "Take the Money and Run"
- 2006 : Relative Strangers : Vocals on Song- "Ac-Cent-Tchu-Ate the Positive"
- 2010 : A Girl's Life: Ford Mosquito (voice)
