= Mike Lipskin =

American musician

Mike Lipskin (born 1945) is a stride jazz pianist of the pre-bop jazz style. A protege of Willie "The Lion" Smith, Eubie Blake and Luckey Roberts, he has created his own special mode within the idiom.

== Career ==
Lipskin is a piano instructor, record producer and author. He has striven to keep alive the form of jazz piano known as "Harlem Stride Piano", performing varied repertoire and originals, and has concertized throughout the United States and Europe, both singly and with Dinah Lee, a trad jazz singer. He produced the RCA Vintage Series of historic reissues, played piano and organ on Papa John Creach's self-titled album, produced Ryo Kawasaki's Juice album, and produced Gil Evans' Gil Evans Orchestra Plays the Music of Jimi Hendrix.

His 1958 photographs and commentary contributed to the 1995 documentary film A Great Day in Harlem. Lipskin performed at the Fats Waller centennial concert at the 22nd San Francisco Jazz Festival. Lipskin has directed and performed in six Davies Symphony Hall Stride Summits in San Francisco and performed at Carnegie Hall. He has several recordings both as soloist and with other pre-bop musicians. He was staff producer for RCA Records, NY from 1964 to 1977.
