= Curtis Counce =

American jazz double bassist (1926–1963)

Background information
- Born: January 23, 1926; Kansas City, Missouri, U.S.
- Died: July 31, 1963 (aged 37) Los Angeles, California
- Genres: Jazz, hard bop
- Instrument: Double bass
- Label: Contemporary

Curtis Counce (January 23, 1926 – July 31, 1963) was an American hard bop and West Coast jazz double bassist.

== Biography ==
Counce was born in Kansas City, Missouri and moved to California in 1945. He began recording in 1946 with Lester Young, and in the 1950s in Los Angeles with musicians such as Shorty Rogers, Stan Kenton, Shelly Manne, Lyle Murphy, Teddy Charles, and Clifford Brown. Counce formed his quintet in 1956 featuring tenor saxophonist Harold Land, trumpeter Jack Sheldon, pianist Carl Perkins and drummer Frank Butler. Elmo Hope replaced Perkins after his death at age 29 in 1958. Gerald Wilson replaced Sheldon on some recordings. The four albums originally released on Contemporary Records were reissued in 2006 on a double CD by Gambit Spain. Counce died in Los Angeles, California, of a heart attack. He was survived by his wife, Mildred Counce, his daughter, Celeste Counce, and a son. Counce's son, born April 10, 1961, was placed for adoption by his biological mother. Curtis knew of his son, but due to his life circumstances, Counce could not be a part of his life. Curtis's son died on January 23, 2022.

== Discography ==
=== As leader ===
- The Curtis Counce Group (Contemporary, 1957)
- You Get More Bounce with Curtis Counce! (Contemporary, 1957)
- Exploring the Future (Dootone, 1958)
- Carl's Blues (Contemporary, 1960)
- Sonority (Contemporary, 1989)

=== As sideman ===
With Teddy Charles

- Collaboration West (Prestige, 1956)
- Evolution (Prestige, 1957)

With Maynard Ferguson

- Dimensions (EmArcy, 1955)
- Maynard Ferguson's Hollywood Party (EmArcy, 1954)
- Stratospheric (Mercury, 1976)

With Herb Geller

- Herb Geller Plays (EmArcy, 1954)
- Jazz Studio 2 from Hollywood (Decca, 1954)
- Jazz Studio 2 from Hollywood Part II (Brunswick, 1954)

With Pete Jolly

- I Get a Kick Out of You (RCA, 1955)
- Jolly Jumps In (RCA Victor, 1955)

With Lyle Murphy

- 12-Tone Compositions & Arrangements (Contemporary, 1955)
- New Orbits in Sound (GNP, 1958)

With Shorty Rogers

- Cool and Crazy (RCA Victor, 1953)
- Shorty Rogers Courts the Count (RCA Victor, 1954)
- The Swinging Mr. Rogers (Atlantic, 1955)
- Collaboration (RCA Victor, 1955)
- Shorty Rogers and His Giants (RCA Victor, 1956)
- The Big Shorty Rogers Express (RCA Victor, 1956)
- Way Up There (Atlantic, 1957)
- Martians Stay Home (Atlantic, 1980)

With Frank Rosolino

- That Old Black Magic (Capitol, 1954)
- Frank Rosolino (Capitol, 1956)

With others

- Chet Baker & Art Pepper, Playboys (World Pacific, 1957)
- Clifford Brown, Clifford Brown All Stars (EmArcy, 1956)
- Buddy Collette & Chico Hamilton, Tanganyika (Dig, 1956)
- Maxwell Davis, Compositions of Duke Ellington and Others (Crown, 1960)
- Buddy DeFranco, Generalissimo (Verve, 1958)
- Herbie Fields, Blow Hot Blow Cool (Decca, 1955)
- Jimmy Giuffre, Jimmy Giuffre (Capitol, 1954)
- Bill Holman, Bill Holman (Capitol, 1954)
- Illinois Jacquet, Illinois Jacquet and His Orchestra (Clef, 1957)
- Stan Kenton, Cuban Fire! (Capitol, 1956)
- Shelly Manne, The West Coast Sound (Contemporary, 1956)
- Johnny Otis, Willie and the Hand Jive (Capitol, 1958)
- Max Roach, Herb Geller, Walter Benton, Joe Maini, Clifford Brown, Best Coast Jazz (Mercury/EmArcy, 1956)
- John Williams, Plays the Music of Harold Arlen (Discovery, 1984)
- Claude Williamson, Salute to Bud (Capitol, 1954)
- Lester Young, Swinging Lester Young (Score, 1957)
