= Dootsie Williams =

American musician and record producer (1911–1991)

Background information
- Born: Walter D. Williams Jr. June 17, 1911; Mobile, Alabama, United States
- Died: August 21, 1991 (aged 80) Los Angeles, California, U.S.
- Genres: Comedy, doo-wop, gospel
- Occupations: Record executive, record producer, band leader
- Years active: 1940s–1975
- Labels: Dooto, Dootone

Walter D. Williams Jr. (June 17, 1911 – August 21, 1991), known as Dootsie Williams, was an American record producer and record label owner who released early records by Redd Foxx and The Penguins.

== Life and career ==
Williams was born in Mobile, Alabama, in 1911, and by 1918 had moved with his family to Los Angeles. He was a leader of the Harlem Dukes band in the 1940s. While performing at gigs, he came up with the idea of recording other artists.

In 1949, Williams founded the Blue Records label. Two years later he changed the name to Dootone. One of the first artists he recorded on Dootone was a violinist named Johnny Creach, who years later would become popular as Papa John Creach. In 1954, he recorded a local group called The Penguins, who would have a huge hit with "Earth Angel".

While the label would record a wide variety of music, it would be best known for a series of comedy recordings by Redd Foxx. Williams saw the comedian perform at the Brass Rail, a local Los Angeles nightclub, and signed Foxx to a recording contract. Laff of the Party, the first of many albums that Foxx recorded for Williams, became a cult favorite and helped establish him as a national star.

Williams died in Los Angeles on August 21, 1991.

== Discography ==
- Penguins
- Medallions
- Don Julian & Meadowlarks
- Calvanes
- Helen Humes
- Dexter Gordon
- Chuck Higgins & His Band
- Ernie Freeman & Lorenzo Holden Trio
- Carl Perkins
- Hattie Noel & Billy Mitchell
- Redd Foxx
- Lillian Randolph Singers
- Don Bexley & Dave Turner
- Peppy Prince Orchestra
- Buddy Collette Quintet
- Curtis Counce
- George Kirby
- Allen Drew
- Sloppy Daniels with Kathy Cooper & "Skillet"
- Gene & Freddie
- Joel Cowan
- Willie Hayden
- Zion Travelers
- Rudy Moore
- Roscoe Holland
- Scatman Crothers
- Billy Allyn
- Ray Scott
- Rozelle Gayle
- Martin Luther King, "I Have a Dream"
- Richard & Willie
- Big George Kerr
- Robo Roberts and Flash Gordon
- Rudy Ray Moore
- Cuff Links
