= Live at the Village Vanguard =

Live at the Village Vanguard may refer to:

== George Adams & Don Pullen ==
- Live at the Village Vanguard (George Adams & Don Pullen album), 1983
- Live at the Village Vanguard Vol. 2, 1983

== Jon Batiste ==
- Anatomy of Angels: Live at the Village Vanguard
- Chronology of a Dream: Live at the Village Vanguard, both 2019 albums

== Kenny Burrell ==
- A Night at the Vanguard, 1959
- Kenny Burrell Live at the Village Vanguard, 1978

== John Coltrane ==
- Coltrane "Live" at the Village Vanguard, 1962
- Live at the Village Vanguard Again!, 1966

== Bill Evans ==
- Sunday at the Village Vanguard, 1961
- Waltz for Debby, 1962
- Turn Out the Stars: The Final Village Vanguard Recordings, 1996
- The Complete Village Vanguard Recordings, 1961, 2005

== Elvin Jones ==
- Live at the Village Vanguard (Elvin Jones album), 1968
- Live at the Village Vanguard Volume One, 1984

== Hank Jones, Ron Carter and Tony Williams ==
- The Great Jazz Trio at the Village Vanguard, 1977
- The Great Jazz Trio at the Village Vanguard Vol. 2, 1977
- The Great Jazz Trio at the Village Vanguard Again, 2000

== Joe Lovano ==
- Quartets: Live at the Village Vanguard, 1994
- On This Day ... Live at the Vanguard, 2003

== Brad Mehldau ==
- Live at the Village Vanguard: The Art of the Trio Volume Two, 1998
- Art of the Trio 4: Back at the Vanguard, 1999
- Brad Mehldau Trio Live, recorded 2006, released 2008

== Paul Motian ==
- At the Village Vanguard, 1995
- Live at the Village Vanguard (Paul Motian album), 2007
- Live at the Village Vanguard Vol. II (Paul Motian album), 2008
- Live at the Village Vanguard Vol. III, 2011

== Junko Onishi ==
- Live at the Village Vanguard (Junko Onishi album), 1994
- Live at the Village Vanguard Vol. II (Junko Onishi album), 1995

== Art Pepper ==
- Thursday Night at the Village Vanguard, 1979
- Friday Night at the Village Vanguard, 1979
- Saturday Night at the Village Vanguard, 1979
- More for Les at the Village Vanguard, 1985

== Chris Potter ==
- Lift: Live at the Village Vanguard, 2004
- Follow the Red Line: Live at the Village Vanguard, 2007
- Got the Keys to the Kingdom: Live at the Village Vanguard, 2023

== Christian McBride ==
- Live at the Village Vanguard (2015 Christian McBride album)
- Live at the Village Vanguard (2021 Christian McBride album)

== Others ==
- Live at the Village Vanguard (Geri Allen album), 1990
- Live at the Village Vanguard (Uri Caine Trio album), 2004
- Live at the Village Vanguard (Dizzy Gillespie album), 1967
- Panorama: Live at the Village Vanguard, Jim Hall, 1997
- Live at the Village Vanguard (Tom Harrell album), 2002
- Folklore: Live at the Village Vanguard, Vincent Herring, 1993
- Live at the Village Vanguard (The Thad Jones / Mel Lewis Orchestra album), 1967
- Fire! Live at the Village Vanguard, David Newman, 1990
- Live at the Village Vanguard (Michel Petrucciani album), 1984
- Spirit of the Moment – Live at the Village Vanguard, Joshua Redman, 1995
- Live at the Village Vanguard (Marc Ribot album), 2014
- Live at the Village Vanguard (Red Rodney album), 1980
- Stepping Stones: Live at the Village Vanguard, Woody Shaw, 1978
- McCoy Tyner Plays John Coltrane: Live at the Village Vanguard, 2001
- Live at the Village Vanguard (Chucho Valdés album), 2000
- The Git Go – Live at the Village Vanguard, Mal Waldron, 1987
- Alive at the Village Vanguard, Fred Hersch and Esperanza Spalding, 2023
- Happening: Live at the Village Vanguard, Gerald Clayton, 2020
- Immanuel Wilkins Quartet: Live at the Village Vanguard Vol. 1, a 2026 album

== …at the Village Vanguard ==
- Charlie Byrd at the Village Vanguard, 1961
- Betty Carter at the Village Vanguard, 1970
- Junior Mance Trio at the Village Vanguard, 1961
- Gerry Mulligan and the Concert Jazz Band at the Village Vanguard, 1960
- A Night at the "Village Vanguard", Sonny Rollins, 1957

== …at the Vanguard ==
- Nights at the Vanguard, Tommy Flanagan, 1986
- Sunday Night at the Vanguard, Fred Hersch, 2016
- Hi Jinx at the Vanguard, Red Rodney and Ira Sullivan, 1984

== See also ==
- Village Vanguard, New York
