= Philip Stein =

American painter

"Estaño"
- Born: Philip Stein; February 5, 1919; Newark, New Jersey
- Died: April 27, 2009 (aged 90); Manhattan
- Known for: painting
- Notable work: Village Vanguard murals
- Movement: Mexican muralism

Philip Stein, better known as "Estaño" (February 5, 1919 – April 27, 2009), was an American painter and muralist.

== Biography ==
Stein studied painting autodidactically, before he visited classes at the Pratt Institute in Brooklyn and at the New School for Social Research in Manhattan. He also painted several pictures during his World War II service as a soldier of the Eighth Air Force and the Ninth United States Army. After he returned to the United States in November 1945, he participated in night classes at the New School for Social Research, due to the benefit of the GI educational bill. In 1943 he married Gertrude Goodkin. They moved to Los Angeles in 1946, where he worked in the film studios, and visited courses at Chouinard School of Art in the evenings. His last work in Hollywood was the scenery design for the opera Boris Godunov. After the Hollywood strike of 1947, he made use of the time he had left to study with the GI Bill. He moved to Mexico in 1948, where he visited the art school in San Miguel de Allende and later the Instituto Nacional de Bellas Artes (INBA) in Mexico City, and joined the muralism movement. From 1948 to 1958 he painted murals together with David Alfaro Siqueiros, who nicknamed him "Estaño". Stein exhibited for his first time in Mexico City in 1953. In 1958 he returned to the United States, where he painted the back-wall mural of the Village Vanguard club, which is run by his sister Lorraine Gordon, widow of Max Gordon. From the 1980s to 1993, he and his wife lived in Vilassar de Dalt, where he painted, hosted a jazz radio show and produced two albums on the Jazz Art label by Big Chief Russell Moore.

He died in April 2009, and left his wife Gertrude and his two daughters Elizabeth Frame of Boulder, Colorado, and Anne Stein of Los Angeles.

== Bibliography ==
- Philip Stein, Siqueiros: his life and works, 1994
- Philip Stein, The Mexican murals, 1984
