= Workin' Out! with the Barney Kessel Quartet =

1961 studio album by Barney Kessell Quartet

Studio album by Barney Kessel Quartet
- Released: 1961
- Recorded: January 9 & 10, 1961
- Studio: Contemporary Records Studio, Los Angeles, California
- Genre: Jazz
- Length: 43:16
- Label: Contemporary M3585/S7585
- Producer: Lester Koenig

Barney Kessel chronology
Exploring the Scene! (1960)	Workin' Out! with the Barney Kessel Quartet (1961)	Breakfast at Tiffany's (1961)

Workin' Out! with the Barney Kessel Quartet is an album by guitarist Barney Kessel recorded in 1961 and released on the Contemporary label.

== Reception ==
Professional ratings
Review scores
Source	Rating
Allmusic	3/5 stars

The Allmusic review by Scott Yanow states: "Nothing all that unusual occurs, but the music is fine modern mainstream jazz from the early '60s".

== Track listing ==
1. "Good Li'l Man" (Marvin Jenkins) - 3:24
2. "Summertime" (George Gershwin, DuBose Heyward) - 5:47
3. "Spanish Scenery" (Barney Kessel) - 6:32
4. "When Johnny Comes Marching Home" (Louis Lambert) - 6:20
5. "New Rhumba" (Ahmad Jamal) - 5:45
6. "My Man's Gone Now" (Gershwin, Heyward) - 6:31
7. "My Funny Valentine" (Richard Rodgers, Lorenz Hart) - 4:47
8. "Pedal Point" (Kessel) - 4:10

== Personnel ==
- Barney Kessel - guitar
- Marvin Jenkins - piano, flute
- Jerry Good - bass
- Stan Popper - drums
