= Friday Night at the Village Vanguard =

Live album by Art Pepper
- Released: 1980
- Recorded: July 29, 1977
- Venue: Village Vanguard, New York City
- Genre: Jazz
- Length: 54:12
- Label: Contemporary/OJC
- Producer: Lester Koenig, John Koenig

Art Pepper chronology
| Thursday Night at the Village Vanguard (1977) | Friday Night at the Village Vanguard (1980) | Saturday Night at the Village Vanguard (1977) |

Friday Night at the Village Vanguard is a 1977 jazz album by saxophonist Art Pepper, playing with George Cables, George Mraz and Elvin Jones.

Art Pepper played at the Village Vanguard jazz club in New York City twice during 1977. The second occasion was recorded and was released as three albums: Thursday Night at the Village Vanguard, Friday Night at the Village Vanguard and Saturday Night at the Village Vanguard. Further tracks appeared on the album More for Les at the Village Vanguard and a complete record of Pepper's residency was subsequently released as The Complete Village Vanguard Sessions.

In the sleeve notes, Pepper says of his own tunes:

My tunes are very difficult to read and interpret. I write down all the parts, and ask my group to play it like it's written for a while and then just use it as a guide and play with their own feelings.

Of "But Beautiful" he says:

Billie Holiday sang this song so beautifully. I've always been influenced by the way a good singer can express something beyond the words of a song. I try to express the quality of the human voice when I'm playing a ballad.

== Reception ==
AllMusic reviewer Scott Yanow called the album "very successful" and the rhythm section "highly sympathetic."

Professional ratings
Review scores
| Source | Rating |
|---|---|
| AllMusic | 4.5/5 stars |
| The Penguin Guide to Jazz Recordings | 3/4 stars |
| The Rolling Stone Jazz Record Guide | 3/5 stars |

== Track listing ==
1. "Las Cuevas de Mario" (Art Pepper) — 11:08
2. "But Beautiful" (Jimmy Van Heusen; Johnny Burke) — 10:17
3. "Caravan" (Edward Kennedy Ellington; Juan Tizol; Irving Mills) — 13:29
4. "Labyrinth" (Art Pepper) — 12:10
5. "A Night In Tunisia" (Dizzy Gillespie, Frank Paparelli) — 5:45 Bonus track on CD reissue

(Recorded July 29, 1977.)

== Personnel ==
- Art Pepper — alto saxophone, tenor saxophone on "Caravan"
- George Cables — piano
- George Mraz — bass
- Elvin Jones — drums

== Sources ==
- Richard Cook & Brian Morton. The Penguin Guide to Jazz on CD 4th edition. Penguin, 1998. ISBN 0-14-051383-3
