= The Poll Winners =

Studio album by Barney Kessel with Shelly Manne and Ray Brown
- Released: 1957
- Recorded: March 18 & 19, 1957
- Studio: Contemporary Records Studio, Los Angeles, California
- Genre: Jazz
- Length: 40:35
- Label: Contemporary
- Producer: Lester Koenig

Barney Kessel chronology
Music to Listen to Barney Kessel By (1956)	The Poll Winners (1957)	Let's Cook! (1957)

The Poll Winners is an album by jazz guitarist Barney Kessel with drummer Shelly Manne and bassist Ray Brown that was recorded in 1957 and released by Contemporary Records. The album was the first of five to be released by the group.

== Reception ==
Professional ratings
Review scores
Source	Rating
Down Beat	4.5/5 stars
Allmusic	4.5/5 stars
The Penguin Guide to Jazz Recordings	3.5/4 stars

The Allmusic review by Ronnie D. Lankford Jr. states: "The choice of material, the interplay between the three players, and the lead work all meld together beautifully on The Poll Winners, making it a classic guitar album in a small-group setting".

== Track listing ==
1. "Jordu" (Duke Jordan) - 3:27
2. "Satin Doll" (Duke Ellington, Billy Strayhorn, Johnny Mercer) - 6:30
3. "It Could Happen to You" (Jimmy Van Heusen, Johnny Burke) - 4:23
4. "Mean to Me" (Fred E. Ahlert, Roy Turk) - 6:28
5. "Don't Worry 'bout Me" (Rube Bloom, Ted Koehler) - 4:34
6. "On Green Dolphin Street" (Bronisław Kaper, Ned Washington) - 4:02
7. "You Go to My Head" (J. Fred Coots, Haven Gillespie) - 4:22
8. "Minor Mood" (Barney Kessel) - 3:18
9. "Nagasaki" (Harry Warren, Mort Dixon) - 3:05

== Personnel ==
- Barney Kessel - guitar
- Ray Brown - bass
- Shelly Manne - drums
