= More Swinging Sounds =

Studio album by Shelly Manne & His Men
- Released: 1957
- Recorded: July 16 and August 15 & 16, 1956
- Studio: Contemporary Records Studio, Los Angeles, California
- Genre: Jazz
- Length: 40:32
- Label: Contemporary C3519
- Producer: Lester Koenig

Shelly Manne chronology
Shelly Manne & His Friends (1956)	More Swinging Sounds (1957)	My Fair Lady (1956)

More Swinging Sounds is a jazz album by drummer Shelly Manne's group Shelly Manne & His Men, recorded in 1956 and released by the Contemporary label. Early releases of the album were labelled Vol 5, indicating it was the fifth volume of recordings released by the group.

== Reception ==
Professional ratings
Review scores
Source	Rating
AllMusic	4.5/5 stars
The Penguin Guide to Jazz Recordings	3/4 stars

The AllMusic review by Scott Yanow states: "Shelly Manne deserves great credit for being continually open to new directions and fresh material while staying on his own singular path".

== Track listing ==
1. "Moose the Mooche" (Charlie Parker) - 7:27
2. "The Wind" (Russ Freeman) - 5:02
3. "Pint of Blues" (Charlie Mariano) - 9:49
4. "Tommyhawk" (Johnny Mandel) - 4:18
5. "Quartet (A Suite in Four Parts)" (Bill Holman) - 15:38

== Personnel ==
Shelly Manne & His Men

- Shelly Manne - drums
- Stu Williamson - trumpet, valve trombone
- Charlie Mariano - alto saxophone
- Russ Freeman - piano
- Leroy Vinnegar - bass
