= Swinging Sounds =

Studio album by Shelly Manne & His Men
- Released: 1956
- Recorded: January 19 & 26 and February 2, 1956
- Studio: Contemporary Records Studio, Los Angeles, California
- Genre: Jazz
- Length: 40:32
- Label: Contemporary C3516
- Producer: Lester Koenig

Shelly Manne chronology
The West Coast Sound (1954-55)	Swinging Sounds (1956)	Shelly Manne & His Friends (1956)

Swinging Sounds is a jazz album by drummer Shelly Manne's group Shelly Manne & His Men, recorded in 1956 and released on the Contemporary label. Early releases of the album were labelled Vol 4, indicating it was the fourth volume of recordings released by the group.

== Reception ==
Professional ratings
Review scores
Source	Rating
AllMusic	4/5 stars
Disc	3.5/5 stars
The Penguin Guide to Jazz Recordings	3.5/4 stars

In an AllMusic review by Scott Yanow, it is stated: "This early edition of Shelly Manne & His Men is a well-integrated unit".

== Track listing ==
1. "The Dart Game" (Charlie Mariano) - 3:09
2. "Bea's Flat" (Russ Freeman) - 4:38
3. "Pathenia" (Shelly Manne) - 4:41
4. "Un Poco Loco" (Bud Powell) - 9:01
5. "Bernie's Tune" (Bernie Miller) - 4:27
6. "Doxy" (Sonny Rollins) - 6:41
7. "Slan" (Mariano) - 4:51
8. "A Gem from Tiffany" (Bill Holman) - 3:04

== Personnel ==
Shelly Manne & His Men

- Shelly Manne - drums
- Stu Williamson - trumpet, valve trombone
- Charlie Mariano - alto saxophone
- Russ Freeman - piano
- Leroy Vinnegar - bass
