= Exploring the Scene! =

Studio album by Barney Kessel, Shelly Manne & Ray Brown
- Released: 1960
- Recorded: August 30 & 31 & September 1, 1960
- Studio: Contemporary Records Studio, Los Angeles, California
- Genre: Jazz
- Length: 41:09
- Label: Contemporary C3581/S7581
- Producer: Lester Koenig

Barney Kessel chronology
| Barney Kessel's Swingin' Party (1960) | Exploring the Scene! (1960) | Workin' Out! with the Barney Kessel Quartet (1961) |

Exploring the Scene! is an album by The Poll Winners, guitarist Barney Kessel with drummer Shelly Manne and bassist Ray Brown, recorded in 1960 and released on the Contemporary label. The album was the fourth of five to be released by the group.

== Reception ==
Professional ratings
Review scores
| Source | Rating |
|---|---|
| Allmusic | 4/5 stars |
| DownBeat | 3.5/5 stars |

The Allmusic review by Scott Yanow stated: "it may very well be their strongest program... Worth searching for".

The DownBeat review by Leonard Feather assigned the album 3.5 stars. He said that "all eight tracks are performed with skill and sensitivity. Such is the mutual feeling among the men that this could be called the best one-piece trio in jazz".

== Track listing ==
1. "Little Susie" (Ray Bryant) - 3:56
2. "The Duke" (Dave Brubeck) - 4:53
3. "So What" (Miles Davis) - 5:28
4. "Misty" (Erroll Garner) - 3:27
5. "Doodlin'" (Horace Silver) - 3:32
6. "The Golden Striker" (John Lewis) - 3:22
7. "Li'l Darlin'" (Neal Hefti) - 5:28
8. "The Blessing" (Ornette Coleman) - 4:48
9. "This Here" (Bobby Timmons) - 6:35

== Personnel ==
- Barney Kessel - guitar
- Ray Brown - bass
- Shelly Manne - drums
