= Feeling Free =

Feeling Free may refer to:

- Feeling Free (Barney Kessell album)
- Feeling Free (Sydney Youngblood album)
