= Kessel Plays Standards =

Studio album by Barney Kessel
- Released: 1956
- Recorded: June 4 and July 1, 1954, and September 12, 1955
- Studio: Contemporary Records Studio, Los Angeles, California
- Genre: Jazz
- Label: Contemporary C3512
- Producer: Lester Koenig

Barney Kessel chronology
Easy Like (1953-56)	Kessel Plays Standards (1956)	To Swing or Not to Swing (1955)

Kessel Plays Standards (subtitled Barney Kessel Volume 2) is an album by guitarist Barney Kessel released on the Contemporary label and featuring eight tracks originally released on the Barney Kessel Volume 2 10-inch album which were recorded at sessions in 1954 along with an additional four tracks from 1955.

Kessel wrote in the liner notes that it was his purpose "in this album to use an instrumentation that hadn't been recorded before, or at least rarely recorded, and to capture some different sounds, combinations of different instruments."

The cover photograph was taken by California jazz and fashion photographer William Claxton.

== Reception ==
Professional ratings
Review scores
Source	Rating
Allmusic	4.5/5 stars
The Penguin Guide to Jazz Recordings	3/4 stars

The Allmusic review by Scott Yanow states: "Inventive frameworks and the utilization of Cooper's jazz oboe (a real rarity in jazz of the time) give the otherwise boppish reissue its own personality".

== Track listing ==
1. "Speak Low" (Kurt Weill, Ogden Nash) – 2:45
2. "Love Is Here to Stay" (George Gershwin, Ira Gershwin) – 3:26
3. "On a Slow Boat to China" (Frank Loesser) – 3:18
4. "How Long Has This Been Going On?" (George Gershwin, Ira Gershwin) – 3:20
5. "My Old Flame" (Arthur Johnston, Sam Coslow) – 3:39
6. "Jeepers Creepers" (Harry Warren, Johnny Mercer) – 3:51
7. "Barney's Blues" (Barney Kessel) – 3:00
8. "Prelude to a Kiss" (Duke Ellington, Irving Gordon, Irving Mills) – 3:13
9. "A Foggy Day" (George Gershwin, Ira Gershwin) – 3:10
10. "You Stepped Out of a Dream" (Nacio Herb Brown, Gus Kahn) – 2:53
11. "I Didn't Know What Time It Was" (Richard Rodgers, Lorenz Hart) – 3:57
12. "64 Bars on Wilshire" (Kessel) – 3:17
- Recorded at Contemporary's studio in Los Angeles on June 4, 1954 (tracks 1, 3, 8 & 9), July 1, 1954 (tracks 2, 4, 7 & 12) and September 12, 1955 (tracks 5, 6, 10 & 11).

== Personnel ==
- Barney Kessel – guitar
- Bob Cooper – tenor saxophone, oboe
- Claude Williamson (tracks 1–4, 7–9 & 12), Hampton Hawes (tracks 6, 10 & 11) – piano
- Monty Budwig (tracks 1–4, 7–9 & 12), Red Mitchell (tracks 5, 6, 10 & 11) – bass
- Shelly Manne (tracks 1–4, 7–9 & 12), Chuck Thompson (tracks 5, 6, 10 & 11) – drums
