= Arnold Ross (musician) =

American jazz musician

Arnold Ross (January 29, 1921, Boston - June 5, 2000, Culver City, California) was an American jazz pianist.

Arnold learned clarinet, trumpet, and violin as a child before picking up piano when he was twelve years old. He played on a cruise ship before relocating to New York City, working there with Jack Jenney. He then joined Vaughn Monroe's backing band, and in 1943 was drafted and entered the Glenn Miller Army Air Force Band. From 1944 to 1947 he worked with Harry James; around the same time he played with Harry Edison, Charlie Ventura, and Charlie Parker. He moved to California in 1947, working with Lena Horne, Dizzy Gillespie, Bob Crosby, and Billy Eckstine, in addition to leading his own small group.

By 1960 Ross had become addicted to heroin, and entered a Synanon treatment program; he became affiliated with the Synanon organization and appeared in the Synanon film in 1965. He worked extensively with Nelson Riddle from 1968 to 1976, and was active as a touring performer into the 1990s.

== Discography ==
=== As leader ===
- Piano and Rhythm (Vogue, 1952) With Joe Benjamin, bass; Bill Clake, drums.
- Barbed Wire, Bums, and Beans (Jazz Chronicles, 1976)

=== As sideman ===
With Benny Carter

- Aspects (United Artists, 1959)

With Harry Edison

- The Inventive Mr. Edison (Pacific Jazz, 1953 [1960])

With Dizzy Gillespie

- Dizzy at Home and Abroad (Atlantic, 1957)
- Dizzy (Vogue, 1960)
- Plays in Paris (Vogue, 1953)
- Havin' a Good Time in Paris Vol. 1 (Jazz Legacy, 1979)

With Harry James

- Soft Lights, Sweet Trumpet (Columbia, 1954)
- One Night Stand with Harry James (Joyce, 1975)
- Coast to Coast with Harry James and His Orchestra (Kaydee, 1976)

With Barney Kessel

- Easy Like (Contemporary, 1956)

With Anita O'Day

- An Evening with Anita O'Day (Norgran, 1955)
- Anita O'Day Swings Cole Porter with Billy May (Verve, 1991)

With Dave Pell

- Jazz Goes Dancing (RCA Victor, 1956)
- Campus Hop Jazz Goes Dancing (RCA Victor, 1958)
- Dave Pell's Prez Conference (GNP Crescendo, 1978)

With others

- Ray Anthony, The New Ray Anthony Show (Capitol, 1960)
- Georgie Auld, In the Land of Hi-Fi (Mercury, 1956)
- Charlie Barnet, Jazz Oasis (Capitol, 1960)
- Buddy Childers, Buddy Childers Quartet (Liberty, 1956)
- Peggy Connelly, Peggy Connelly Sings (Nocturne, 1987)
- Pee Wee Crayton, After Hours Boogie (1988)
- Stan Hasselgard, Jammin' at Jubilee (Dragon, 1981)
- Bob Keene, Bob Keene & His Orchestra (GNP, 1954)
- Charlie Kennedy, Charlie Ventura, Crazy Rhythms (Regent, 1957)
- Gerry Mulligan, Walking Shoes (Capitol, 1972)
- Charlie Parker, Jazz at The Philharmonic 1946 (Verve, 1992)
- Joe Pass, Sounds of Synanon (Pacific Jazz, 1962)
- Nelson Riddle, Contemporary Sound of Nelson Riddle (United Artists, 1968)
- Lester Young, Lester Young at JATP (1966)
