= Barney Kessel's Swingin' Party =

Studio album by Barney Kessel
- Released: 1963
- Recorded: July 19, 1960
- Studio: Contemporary Records Studio, Los Angeles, California
- Genre: Jazz
- Length: 43:05
- Label: Contemporary M3613/S7613
- Producer: Lester Koenig

Barney Kessel chronology
Poll Winners Three! (1959)	Barney Kessel's Swingin' Party (1963)	Exploring the Scene! (1960)

Barney Kessel's Swingin' Party (subtitled at Contemporary) is an album by guitarist Barney Kessel recorded in 1960 but not released on the Contemporary label until 1963.

== Reception ==
Professional ratings
Review scores
Source	Rating
Allmusic	3/5 stars
The Penguin Guide to Jazz Recordings	3/4 stars

The Allmusic review by Scott Yanow states: "Loose, open, and off the cuff, Barney Kessel's Swingin' Party at Contemporary finds Kessel and company in great form. For fans and guitar aficionados who missed the party, this swinging set will serve as a fine substitute".

== Track listing ==
1. "Bluesology" (Milt Jackson) - 9:18
2. "Lover Man" (Jimmy Davis, Ram Ramirez, James Sherman) - 4:53
3. "Joy Spring" (Clifford Brown) - 6:50
4. "Now's the Time" (Charlie Parker) - 8:20
5. "Miss Memphis" (Marvin Jenkins) - 6:29
6. "New Rhumba" (Ahmad Jamal) - 7:15

== Personnel ==
- Barney Kessel - guitar
- Marvin Jenkins - piano, flute
- Gary Peacock - bass
- Ron Lundberg - drums
