= Carmen (Barney Kessel album) =

Studio album by Barney Kessel
- Released: 1959
- Recorded: December 19 & 22, 1958
- Studios: Contemporary Records Studio, Los Angeles, California
- Genre: Jazz
- Length: 43:30
- Label: Contemporary M3563/S7563
- Producer: Lester Koenig

Barney Kessel chronology
The Poll Winners Ride Again! (1958)	Carmen (1959)	Some Like It Hot (1959)

Carmen (full title Modern Jazz Performances from Bizet's Carmen and also referred to as Kessel Plays Carmen) is an album by guitarist Barney Kessel performing adaptations of pieces from Georges Bizet's opera Carmen recorded in late 1958 and released on the Contemporary label.

== Reception ==
Professional ratings
Review scores
Source	Rating
AllMusic	3/5 stars

The AllMusic review by Scott Yanow states: "Kessel also wrote the arrangements, which pay tribute to the melodies while not being shy of swinging the themes. An interesting if not essential project".

== Track listing ==
All compositions adapted from Georges Bizet and arranged by Barney Kessel

1. "Swingin' the Toreador" - 5:41
2. "A Pad on the Edge of Town" - 6:42
3. "If You Dig Me" - 4:00
4. "Free as a Bird" - 4:56
5. "Viva el Toro!" - 3:13
6. "Flowersville" - 5:55
7. "Carmen's Cool" - 4:36
8. "Like, There Is No Place Like..." - 3:56
9. "The Gypsy's Hip" - 3:30

== Personnel ==
- Barney Kessel - guitar
- Ray Linn - trumpet (track 9)
- Harry Betts - trombone (track 9)
- Herb Geller - alto saxophone (track 9)
- Justin Gordon - flute, alto flute, tenor saxophone (tracks 1, 2, 4–6, 8 & 9)
- Buddy Collette - clarinet, flute (tracks 1, 2, 4–6 & 8)
- Jules Jacob - clarinet, oboe (tracks 1, 2, 4–6 & 8)
- Bill Smith - clarinet, bass clarinet (tracks 1, 2, 4–6 & 8)
- Pete Terry - bass clarinet, bassoon (tracks 1, 2, 4–6 & 8)
- André Previn - piano
- Victor Feldman - vibraphone (tracks 3 & 7)
- Joe Mondragon - bass
- Shelly Manne - drums
