= Music to Listen to Barney Kessel By =

Studio album by Barney Kessel
- Released: 1957
- Recorded: August 6, October 15 and December 4, 1956
- Studio: Contemporary Records Studio, Los Angeles, California
- Genre: Jazz
- Length: 40:53
- Label: Contemporary C3521/S7521
- Producer: Lester Koenig

Barney Kessel chronology
| To Swing or Not to Swing (1955) | Music to Listen to Barney Kessel By (1957) | The Poll Winners (1957) |

Music to Listen to Barney Kessel By is an album by guitarist Barney Kessel recorded at sessions in 1956 and released on the Contemporary label.

== Reception ==
Professional ratings
Review scores
| Source | Rating |
|---|---|
| Allmusic | 4/5 stars |
| The Penguin Guide to Jazz Recordings | 3/4 stars |

The Allmusic review by Rovi Staff states: "Featured is Kessel's guitar with five woodwinds and a rhythm section".

== Track listing ==
1. "Cheerful Little Earful" (Harry Warren, Ira Gershwin, Billy Rose) - 3:24
2. "Makin' Whoopee" (Walter Donaldson, Gus Kahn) - 3:18
3. "My Reverie" (Claude Debussy, Larry Clinton) - 2:30
4. "Blues for a Playboy" (Barney Kessel) - 3:58
5. "Love Is for the Very Young" (David Raksin) - 2:27
6. "Carioca" (Vincent Youmans, Edward Eliscu, Gus Kahn) - 4:30
7. "Mountain Greenery" (Richard Rodgers, Lorenz Hart) - 3:46
8. "Indian Summer" (Victor Herbert, Al Dubin) - 4:58
9. "Gone with the Wind" (Allie Wrubel, Herb Magidson) - 2:45
10. "Laura" (Raskin, Johnny Mercer) - 3:23
11. "I Love You" (Cole Porter) - 3:27
12. "Fascinating Rhythm" (George Gershwin, Ira Gershwin) - 2:27
- Recorded at Contemporary's studio in Los Angeles on August 6, 1956 (tracks 2, 9, 11 & 12), October 15, 1956 (tracks 1, 3, 4 & 6) and December 4, 1956 (tracks 5, 7, 8 & 10).

== Personnel ==
- Barney Kessel - guitar
- Buddy Collette - flute, alto flute, clarinet (tracks 2, 9, 11 & 12)
- Junie Cobb - oboe, English horn
- George W. Smith - clarinet
- Justin Gordon - clarinet, bass clarinet
- Howard Terry - clarinet, bass clarinet, bassoon
- André Previn (tracks 2, 9, 11 & 12), Jimmy Rowles (tracks 1, 3–6, 8 & 10), Claude Williamson (track 7) - piano
- Buddy Clark - bass
- Shelly Manne - drums
