= Jazz Giant (Benny Carter album) =

Studio album by Benny Carter
- Released: 1958
- Recorded: June 11, July 22 and October 7, 1957, and April 21, 1958
- Studio: Contemporary Records Studio, Los Angeles, California
- Genre: Jazz
- Length: 38:44
- Label: Contemporary
- Producer: Lester Koenig

Benny Carter chronology
Urbane Jazz (1955)	Jazz Giant (1958)	Swingin' the '20s (1958)

Jazz Giant is an album by saxophonist Benny Carter, recorded in 1957 and 1958 and released by Contemporary Records.

== Reception ==
Professional ratings
Review scores
Source	Rating
AllMusic	4.5/5 stars
The Penguin Guide to Jazz	4/4 stars

At AllMusic, Scott Yanow called the album a "particularly strong septet session" and stated, "This timeless music is beyond the simple categories of 'swing' or 'bop' and should just be called 'classic.'" The Penguin Guide to Jazz wrote that the album "is a terrific small-group record, full of imagination and invention, and the interchanges with Webster are classic".

== Track listing ==
1. "Old Fashioned Love" (James P. Johnson, Cecil Mack) - 7:51
2. "I'm Coming Virginia" (Will Marion Cook, Donald Heywood) - 5:48
3. "A Walkin' Thing" (Carter) - 6:00
4. "Blue Lou" (Irving Mills, Edgar Sampson) - 4:58
5. "Ain't She Sweet" (Milton Ager, Jack Yellen) - 3:40
6. "How Can You Lose" (Carter) - 6:13
7. "Blues My Naughty Sweetie Gives to Me" (Charles McCarron, Russ Morgan, Arthur Swanstrom) - 4:39

== Personnel ==
- Benny Carter – alto saxophone, trumpet, arrangements
- Frank Rosolino – trombone (tracks 1–4 & 6)
- Ben Webster – tenor saxophone (tracks 1–4 & 6)
- André Previn (tracks 1 & 4–7) – piano
- Jimmy Rowles (tracks 2 & 3) – piano
- Barney Kessel – guitar
- Leroy Vinnegar – double bass
- Shelly Manne – drums
