= Easy Like =

Studio album by Barney Kessel
- Released: 1956
- Recorded: November 14 & December 19, 1953, and February 23, 1956
- Studio: Contemporary Records Studio, Los Angeles, California
- Genre: Jazz
- Length: 46:04
- Label: Contemporary
- Producer: Lester Koenig

Barney Kessel chronology
Easy Like (1956)	Kessel Plays Standards (1954)

Easy Like (subtitled Barney Kessel Volume 1) is an album by jazz guitarist Barney Kessel that was released by Contemporary Records in 1956. Eight songs were released on the 10-inch album Barney Kessel which were recorded in 1953, while other songs were recorded in 1956.

== Reception ==
Professional ratings
Review scores
Source	Rating
Allmusic	4.5/5 stars
Disc	5/5 stars
The Penguin Guide to Jazz Recordings	3/4 stars

In the Allmusic review, Scott Yanow states that "the set features Kessel in boppish form".

== Track listing ==
All tracks are written by Barney Kessel except where noted.

No.	Title	Length
1.	"Easy Like"	4:04
2.	"Tenderly" (Walter Gross/Jack Lawrence)	4:06
3.	"Lullaby of Birdland" (George Shearing/George David Weiss)	3:16
4.	"What Is There to Say?" (Vernon Duke/Yip Harburg)	3:10
5.	"Bernardo"	3:34
6.	"Vicky's Dream"	2:37
7.	"Salute to Charlie Christian"	2:52
8.	"That's All" (Alan Brandt/Bob Haymes)	3:18
9.	"I Let a Song Go Out of My Heart" (Duke Ellington/Irving Mills/Henry Nemo/John Redmond)	4:12
10.	"Just Squeeze Me (But Please Don't Tease Me)" (Ellington/Lee Gaines)	3:41
11.	"April in Paris" (Duke/Harburg)	3:00
12.	"North of the Border"	2:46
13.	"Easy Like (alternate take)" (Bonus track on CD)	2:44
14.	"North of the Border (alternate take)" (Bonus track on CD)	2:44

== Personnel ==
- Barney Kessel – guitar
- Buddy Collette – alto saxophone, flute (tracks: 1, 8, 12, 13, 14)
- Bud Shank – alto saxophone, flute (tracks: 2–7, 9, 10)
- Arnold Ross – piano (tracks: 2–7, 9, 10)
- Claude Williamson – piano (tracks: 1, 8, 11, 12, 14)
- Harry Babasin – double bass (tracks: 2–7, 9, 10)
- Red Mitchell – double bass (tracks: 1, 8, 11, 12, 14)
- Shelly Manne – drums
