= Contemporary Records =

American jazz record label (1951–1984)

- Logo used from 1979 to the mid-2000s
- Parent company: Concord Bicycle Music
- Founded: 1951
- Founder: Lester Koenig
- Defunct: 1984
- Status: Inactive
- Genre: Jazz, West Coast jazz
- Country of origin: U.S.
- Official website: concord.com

Contemporary Records was a jazz record company and label founded by Lester Koenig in Los Angeles in 1951. Contemporary produced music from a variety of jazz styles and players.

== West Coast players ==
Contemporary became identified with a style of jazz called West Coast jazz as exemplified by Art Pepper, Chet Baker, Shelly Manne, and André Previn.

In the mid-1960s the company fell into relative limbo, but limited new recordings were made in the late 1970s, including a series of albums by Art Pepper recorded at the Village Vanguard club in New York. After Les Koenig's death in 1977, the label was run for seven years by his son, John, who produced albums by George Cables, Joe Farrell, Joe Henderson, Bobby Hutcherson, Peter Erskine, and Chico Freeman.

In 1984 Contemporary was purchased by Fantasy Records, which used the name for a short time. Most Contemporary titles were reissued by Fantasy. Also, some titles have found new life among today's audiophiles as high-quality LP remasters from Analogue Productions and other audiophile labels. The Fantasy catalog, including Contemporary and its associated labels, Good Time Jazz Records, Society for Forgotten Music, and Contemporary Composers Series, was sold to Concord Records in 2004.

Over the years, a number of major figures in the music business worked for Contemporary. Among them were Atlantic Records executive Nesuhi Ertegun, writers Nat Hentoff and Leonard Feather, producer Joe Boyd, recording engineer and studio designer Howard Holzer, and mastering engineer Bernie Grundman.

== Recording ==
Lester Koenig was very particular about high-fidelity sounds. In 1956 Koenig hired away Roy DuNann from Capitol Records, and DuNann provided some creative recording techniques for the label. He said Koenig provided him with German (Neumann/Telefunken U-47) and Austrian (AKG C-12) condenser microphones and he immediately noted the very high output of these microphones, especially close-in on jazz musicians' dynamic playing. DuNann achieved his signature sound—crisp, clear and balanced without distortion or unpleasant "peak presence"—by keeping his microphone setups very simple (generally one per musician) and avoided the use of pre-amplifiers for them.

He built a simple passive mixing system that directly fed the electronics of his Ampex 350 and 351 tape machines. Also, DuNann told Stereophile that Contemporary sessions were recorded "dry" (without electronic echo added or in a reverberant room). Sometimes, such as in the case of Sonny Rollins' Way Out West, a plate reverb unit was inserted between the tape machine and the LP disc cutting lathe. This is why some later LP and CD reissues of Contemporary albums sound "dry" and "dead" compared to the original LPs mastered by DuNann.

== Discography ==
=== Contemporary 3500/7500 series ===
The 3500 (mono)/7500 (stereo) series of 12 inch LP records commenced in 1955 and ran until 1961. Contemporary was the first jazz label to record albums in stereo from 1956.

Catalog	Artist	Album
3501	Howard Rumsey's Lighthouse All-Stars	Sunday Jazz a la Lighthouse, Vol. 1
3502	Lionel Hampton	He Swings the Most
3503	Lennie Niehaus	Vol 3: The Octet #2
3504	Howard Rumsey's Lighthouse All-Stars	Howard Rumsey's Lighthouse All-Stars Vol. 6
3505	Hampton Hawes Trio	Hampton Hawes Trio
3506	Lyle Murphy	12-Tone Compositions and Arrangements by Lyle Murphy
3507	Shelly Manne & His Men	The West Coast Sound
3508	Howard Rumsey's Lighthouse All-Stars	Howard Rumsey's Lighthouse All-Stars Vol. 3
3509	Howard Rumsey's Lighthouse All-Stars/Barney Kessel/Hampton Hawes Trio with Shelly Manne	Lighthouse at Laguna
3510	Lennie Niehaus	Vol 4: The Quintets & Strings
3511	Barney Kessel	Easy Like
3512	Barney Kessel	Kessel Plays Standards
3513	Barney Kessel	To Swing or Not to Swing
3514	Duane Tatro	Duane Tatro's Jazz for Moderns
3515	Hampton Hawes Trio	This Is Hampton Hawes
3516	Shelly Manne & His Men	Swinging Sounds
3517	Howard Rumsey's Lighthouse All-Stars	In the Solo Spotlight
3518	Lennie Niehaus	Volume 1: The Quintets
3519	Shelly Manne & His Men	More Swinging Sounds
3520	Howard Rumsey's Lighthouse All-Stars	Oboe/Flute
3521	Barney Kessel	Music to Listen to Barney Kessel By
3522	Buddy Collette	Man of Many Parts
3523	Hampton Hawes Trio	Everybody Likes Hampton Hawes
3524	Lennie Niehaus	Vol 5: The Sextet
3525	Shelly Manne	Shelly Manne & His Friends
3526	Curtis Counce	The Curtis Counce Group
3527	Shelly Manne & His Friends	My Fair Lady
3528	Howard Rumsey's Lighthouse All-Stars	Music for Lighthousekeeping
3529	Jimmy Deuchar	Pub Crawling with Jimmy Deuchar
3530	Sonny Rollins	Way Out West
3531	Buddy Collette	Nice Day with Buddy Collette
3532	Art Pepper	Art Pepper Meets the Rhythm Section
3533	Shelly Manne & His Friends	Li'l Abner
3534	Red Norvo	Music to Listen to Red Norvo By
3535	Barney Kessel, Shelly Manne and Ray Brown	The Poll Winners
3536	Shelly Manne & His Men	Concerto for Clarinet & Combo
3537	André Previn & Russ Freeman	Double Play!
3538	Red Mitchell	Presenting Red Mitchell
3539	Curtis Counce	You Get More Bounce with Curtis Counce!
3540	Lennie Niehaus	Zounds!
3541	Victor Feldman	Suite Sixteen
3542	Leroy Vinnegar	Leroy Walks!
3543	André Previn & His Pals	Pal Joey
3544	Bob Cooper	Coop! The Music of Bob Cooper
3545	Hampton Hawes	All Night Session! Vol. 1
3546	Hampton Hawes	All Night Session! Vol. 2
3547	Hampton Hawes	All Night Session! Vol. 3
3548	André Previn & His Pals	Gigi
3549	Victor Feldman	The Arrival of Victor Feldman
3550	Harold Land	Harold in the Land of Jazz
3551	Ornette Coleman	Something Else!!!!
3552	Benny Golson	Benny Golson's New York Scene
3553	Hampton Hawes	Four!
3554	Art Farmer	Portrait of Art Farmer
3555	Benny Carter	Jazz Giant
3556	Barney Kessel, Shelley Manne & Ray Brown	The Poll Winners Ride Again!
3557	Shelly Manne & His Men	The Gambit
3558	André Previn	André Previn Plays Songs by Vernon Duke
3559	Shelly Manne & His Friends	Bells Are Ringing
3560	Shelly Manne & His Men	Shelly Manne & His Men Play Peter Gunn
3561	Benny Carter Quartet	Swingin' the '20s
3562	Cecil Taylor	Looking Ahead!
3563	Barney Kessel	Carmen
3564	Sonny Rollins	Sonny Rollins and the Contemporary Leaders
3565	Barney Kessel	Some Like It Hot
3566	Shelly Manne & His Men	Son of Gunn!!
3567	André Previn	André Previn Plays Songs by Jerome Kern
3568	Art Pepper	Art Pepper + Eleven - Modern Jazz Classics
3569	Ornette Coleman	Tomorrow Is the Question!
3570	André Previn Jazz Trio	King Size!
3571	Helen Humes	'Tain't Nobody's Biz-Ness If I Do
3572	André Previn & His Pals	West Side Story
3573	Art Pepper	Gettin' Together
3574	Curtis Counce Group	Carl's Blues
3575	André Previn	Like Previn!
3576	Barney Kessel, Shelly Manne & Ray Brown	Poll Winners Three!
3577	Shelly Manne & His Men	At the Black Hawk 1
3578	Shelly Manne & His Men	At the Black Hawk 2
3579	Shelly Manne & His Men	At the Black Hawk 3
3580	Shelly Manne & His Men	At the Black Hawk 4
3581	The Poll Winners	Exploring the Scene!
3582	Helen Humes	Songs I Like to Sing!
3583	Teddy Edwards	Teddy's Ready!
3584	Shelly Manne	The Three & The Two
3585	Barney Kessel	Workin' Out! with the Barney Kessel Quartet
3586	André Previn	André Previn Plays Songs by Harold Arlen
3587	Shelly Manne & His Men	The Proper Time
3588	Teddy Edwards and Howard McGhee	Together Again!!!!
3589	Hampton Hawes	For Real!
3590	Ruth Price	Ruth Price with Shelly Manne & His Men at the Manne-Hole
3591	Bill Smith	Folk Jazz
3592	Teddy Edwards	Good Gravy!
3593/4	Shelly Manne & His Men	Live! Shelly Manne & His Men at the Manne-Hole
3595	Gerry Wiggins	Relax and Enjoy It!
3596	Howard McGhee	Maggie's Back in Town!!
3597	Joe Gordon	Lookin' Good!
3598	Helen Humes	Swingin' with Humes
3599	Shelly Manne & His Men	Shelly Manne & His Men Play Checkmate

=== Contemporary Popular 5000/9000 series ===
The 5000 (mono)/9000 (stereo) series of 12 inch LP records commenced in 1956 and ran until 1962.

Catalog	Artist	Album
5001	Mel Henke	Dig Mel Henke
5002	Claire Austin	Claire Austin Sings "When Your Lover Has Gone"
5003	Mel Henke	Now Spin This!
5004	Pepe Romero	!Flamenco Fenomeno!
5005	Victor Feldman	Latinsville!
5006	Shelly Manne and Jack Marshall	Sounds Unheard Of!

=== Contemporary 3600/7600 series ===
The 3600 (mono)/7600 (stereo) series of 12 inch LP records commenced in 1962 and ran until around the early 1980s. After 3624 all releases were stereo only.

Catalog	Artist	Album
3600	Phineas Newborn Jr.	A World of Piano!
3601	Helyne Stewart	Love Moods
3602	Art Pepper	Smack Up
3603	Barney Kessel	Let's Cook!
3604	Joy Bryan	Make the Man Love Me
3605	Jimmy Woods	Awakening!!
3606	Teddy Edwards	Heart & Soul
3607	Art Pepper	Intensity
3608	Leroy Vinnegar	Leroy Walks Again!!
3609	Shelly Manne	My Son the Jazz Drummer!
3610	Prince Lasha Quintet featuring Sonny Simmons	The Cry!
3611	Phineas Newborn, Jr.	The Great Jazz Piano of Phineas Newborn Jr.
3612	Jimmy Woods	Conflict
3613	Barney Kessel	Barney Kessel's Swingin' Party
3614	Hampton Hawes	The Green Leaves of Summer
3615	Phineas Newborn, Jr.	The Newborn Touch
3616	Hampton Hawes	Here and Now
3617	Prince Lasha and Sonny Simmons	Firebirds
3618	Barney Kessel	Feeling Free
3619	Harold Land	The Fox
3620	Elmo Hope	Elmo Hope Trio
3621	Hampton Hawes	The Seance
7622	Phineas Newborn, Jr.	Please Send Me Someone to Love
3623	Sonny Simmons	Rumasuma
3624	Shelly Manne	Outside
7625/6	Sonny Simmons	Burning Spirits
7627/8	Woody Shaw	Blackstone Legacy
7629	Shelly Manne	Alive in London
7630	Art Pepper	The Way It Was!
7631	Hampton Hawes	I'm All Smiles
7632	Woody Shaw	Song of Songs
7633	Art Pepper	Living Legend
7634	Phineas Newborn, Jr.	Harlem Blues
7635	The Poll Winners	Straight Ahead
7636	Art Farmer	On the Road
7637	Hampton Hawes	Hampton Hawes at the Piano
7638	Art Pepper	The Trip
7639	Art Pepper	No Limit
7640	Chico Freeman	Beyond the Rain
7641	Ray Brown	Something for Lester
7642	Art Pepper	Thursday Night at the Village Vanguard
7643	Art Pepper	Friday Night at the Village Vanguard
7644	Art Pepper	Saturday Night at the Village Vanguard
7645	Miles Davis and The Lighthouse All-Stars	At Last!
7646	Ben Webster	Ben Webster at the Renaissance
7647	Terry Gibbs	Dream Band
7648	Phineas Newborn, Jr.	Back Home
7649	Chet Baker and The Lighthouse All-Stars	Witch Doctor
7650	Art Pepper	More for Les at the Village Vanguard
7651	Sonny Rollins	Contemporary Alternate Takes
7652	Terry Gibbs Dream Band	The Sundown Sessions
7653	Hampton Hawes	The Sermon
7654	Terry Gibbs Dream Band	Flying Home
7655	Curtis Counce	Sonority
7656	Terry Gibbs Dream Band	Main Stem
7657	Terry Gibbs	The Big Cat
7658	Terry Gibbs Dream Band	One More Time

=== 14000 series ===
The 14000 series began in 1980 with 12 inch LP records and in 1982 commenced releases on compact disc. After 1992 all releases were CD only.

Catalog	Artist	Album
14001	George Cables	Cables' Vision
14002	Joe Farrell	Sonic Text
14003	Mike Garson	Avant Garson
14004	Tete Montoliu	Lunch in L.A.
14005	Chico Freeman	Peaceful Heart, Gentle Spirit
14006	Joe Henderson	Relaxin' at Camarillo
14007	Jay Hoggard	Rain Forest
14008	Chico Freeman	Destiny's Dance
14009	Bobby Hutcherson	Solo / Quartet
14010	Peter Erskine	Peter Erskine
14011	Bill Perkins	Journey to the East
14012	Bud Shank	California Concert
14013	Frank Morgan	Easy Living
14014	George Cables	Phantom of the City
14015	George Cables	Circle
14016	Jimmy Rowles and Red Mitchell	Jimmy Rowles with the Red Mitchell Trio
14017	Bob Cooper and Snooky Young	In a Mellotone
14018	Shelley Manne	In Zurich
14019	Bud Shank	That Old Feeling
14020	The Jazztet	Back to the City
14021	Frank Morgan	Lament
14022	Terry Gibbs	The Latin Connection
14023	Chris Connor	Classic
14024	Billy Higgins	Bridgework
14025	Joshua Breakstone Quintet	Echoes
14026	Frank Morgan Quintet	Bebop Lives!
14027	Bud Shank	Bud Shank Quartet at Jazz Alley
14028	Luther Hughes	Luther Hughes and Cahoots
14029	Art Farmer	Something to Live For: The Music of Billy Strayhorn
14030	George Cables	By George
14031	Bud Shank	Serious Swingers
14032	Jimmy Rowles	I'm Glad There Is You
14033	Barney Kessel	Spontaneous Combustion
14034	The Jazztet	Real Time
14035	Frank Morgan & George Cables	Double Image
14036	Terry Gibbs and Buddy DeFranco	Chicago Fire
14037	Tom Harrell and George Robert	Sun Dance
14038	Chris Connor	New Again
14039	Frank Morgan and the McCoy Tyner Trio	Major Changes
14040	Joshua Breakstone	Evening Star
14041	Kerry Campbell	Phoenix Rising
14042	Art Farmer	Blame It On My Youth
14043	Tom Harrell	Stories
14044	Barney Kessell	Red Hot & Blue
14045	Frank Morgan Quartet	Yardbird Suite
14046	Jackie and Roy	Full Circle
14047	Terry Gibbs and Buddy DeFranco	Holiday for Swing
14048	Bud Shank	Tomorrow's Rainbow
14049	Carol Sloane	Love You Madly
14050	Joshua Breakstone Quartet	Self-Portrait in Swing
14051	Rumsey, Howard	Jazz Invention
14052	Frank Morgan Allstars	Reflections
14053	John Campbell	After Hours
14054	Tom Harrell	Sail Away
14055	Art Farmer	Ph.D.
14056	Terry Gibbs and Buddy DeFranco	Air Mail Special
14057	Art Farmer and Frank Morgan	Central Avenue Reunion
14058	Kenny Burrell	Guiding Spirit
14059	Tom Harrell	Form
14060	Carol Sloane	The Real Thing
14061	John Campbell	Turning Point
14062	Joshua Breakstone Trio	9 by 3
14063	Tom Harrell	Visions
14064	Frank Morgan and Bud Shank	Quiet Fire
14065	Kenny Burrell	Sunup to Sundown
14066	Terry Gibbs	Memories of You
14067	Terry Gibbs	Kings of Swing
14068	Leroy Vinnegar	Walking the Basses
14069	Celedonio Romero and Celin Romero	Spanish Guitar Music
14070	Pepe Romero	¡Flamenco Fenomeno!
14071	Helen Humes	'Deed I Do
14072	Hampton Hawes	Something Special
14073	Chico Freeman	Focus
14074	Teddy Edwards	Back to Avalon
14075	Melton Mustafa	Boiling Point
14076	Michael Orta	Freedom Tower
14077	Howard Rumsey	Mexican Passport
14078	Terry Myers	Soul Mates
14079	Billy Ross	Woody
14080	Eric Allison	Mean Streets Beat
14081	Dennis Points	Images
14082	Jesse Jones	Soul Serenade
14083	Billy Marcus	Hamp
14084	Lanny Morgan	Pacific Standard
14085	Melton Mustafa	St. Louis Blues
14086	Art Pepper	San Francisco Samba
14087	Tom Ranier	In the Still of the Night
14088	Eric Allison	After Hours

== See also ==
- Cool jazz
- Modal jazz
- Bebop
- List of record labels
