= The Poll Winners Ride Again! =

Studio album by Barney Kessel with Shelly Manne and Ray Brown
- Released: 1958
- Recorded: August 19 & 21, 1958
- Studio: Contemporary Records Studio, Los Angeles, California
- Genre: Jazz
- Length: 38:20
- Label: Contemporary C3556/S7556
- Producer: Lester Koenig

Barney Kessel chronology
Let's Cook! (1957)	The Poll Winners Ride Again! (1958)	Carmen (1958)

The Poll Winners Ride Again! is an album by guitarist Barney Kessel with drummer Shelly Manne and bassist Ray Brown, recorded in 1958 and released on the Contemporary label. The album was the second of five to be released by the group.

== Reception ==
Professional ratings
Review scores
Source	Rating
Allmusic	4/5 stars
The Penguin Guide to Jazz Recordings	3/4 stars

The Allmusic review by Scott Yanow states: "This is a good outing, particularly for bop guitarist Barney Kessel".

== Track listing ==
1. "Be Deedle Dee Do" (Barney Kessel) - 5:32
2. "Volare" (Franco Migliacci, Domenico Modugno) - 4:20
3. "Spring Is Here" (Richard Rodgers, Lorenz Hart) - 4:07
4. "The Surrey with the Fringe on Top" (Rogers, Oscar Hammerstein II) - 5:27
5. "Custard Puff" (Ray Brown) - 4:25
6. "When the Red, Red Robin (Comes Bob, Bob, Bobbin' Along)" (Harry M. Woods) - 4:15
7. "Foreign Intrigue" (Kessel) - 3:22
8. "Angel Eyes" (Matt Dennis, Earl Brent) - 4:40
9. "The Merry-Go-Round Broke Down" (Dave Franklin, Cliff Friend) - 2:12

== Personnel ==
- Barney Kessel - guitar
- Ray Brown - bass
- Shelly Manne - drums
