= Shelly Manne & His Friends =

Studio album by Shelly Manne, André Previn and Leroy Vinnegar
- Released: 1956
- Recorded: February 11, 1956
- Studio: Contemporary Records Studio, Los Angeles, California
- Genre: Jazz
- Length: 36:16
- Label: Contemporary C3525
- Producer: Lester Koenig

Shelly Manne chronology
Swinging Sounds (1956)	Shelly Manne & His Friends (1956)	More Swinging Sounds (1956)

Shelly Manne & His Friends is a jazz album by drummer Shelly Manne with pianist André Previn and bassist Leroy Vinnegar recorded in 1956 and released on the Contemporary label.

== Reception ==
Professional ratings
Review scores
Source	Rating
AllMusic	4/5 stars
The Rolling Stone Jazz Record Guide	4/5 stars
The Penguin Guide to Jazz Recordings	3.5/4 stars

The AllMusic review by Scott Yanow states: "This initial release from the group, as with all of the later sets, is really a showcase for the remarkable piano playing of Previn who was not even 27 yet but already had a dozen years of major league experience behind him".

== Track listing ==
1. "Tangerine" (Victor Schertzinger, Johnny Mercer) - 4:25
2. "I Cover the Waterfront" (Johnny Green, Edward Heyman) - 6:10
3. "Squatty Roo" (Johnny Hodges) - 7:58
4. "Collard Greens and Black-Eyed Peas" (Oscar Pettiford) - 7:57
5. "Stars Fell on Alabama" (Frank Perkins, Mitchell Parish) - 4:42
6. "The Girl Friend" (Richard Rodgers, Lorenz Hart) - 5:20

== Personnel ==
- Shelly Manne - drums
- André Previn - piano
- Leroy Vinnegar - bass
