= To Swing or Not to Swing =

Studio album by Barney Kessel
- Released: 1956
- Recorded: March 28 & July 26, 1955
- Studio: Contemporary Records Studio, Los Angeles, California
- Genre: Jazz
- Length: 40:24
- Label: Contemporary C3511
- Producer: Lester Koenig

Barney Kessel chronology
Kessel Plays Standards (1954-55)	To Swing or Not to Swing (1956)	Music to Listen to Barney Kessel By (1956)

To Swing or Not to Swing (subtitled Barney Kessel Volume 3) is an album by guitarist Barney Kessel released on the Contemporary label which was recorded at sessions in 1955.

== Reception ==
Professional ratings
Review scores
Source	Rating
Allmusic	5/5 stars
Disc	5/5 stars
The Penguin Guide to Jazz Recordings	3.5/4 stars

The AllMusic review by Scott Yanow states: "the overall result is a recording highly recommended to fans of straight-ahead jazz".

== Track listing ==
All compositions by Barney Kessel, except as indicated

1. "Begin the Blues" - 4:29
2. "Louisiana" (J. C. Johnson, Andy Razaf, Bob Schafer) - 3:57
3. "Happy Feeling" - 3:58
4. "Embraceable You" (George Gershwin, Ira Gershwin) - 3:24
5. "Wail Street" - 4:25
6. "Back Home Again in Indiana" (James F. Hanley, Ballard MacDonald) - 3:13
7. "Moten Swing" (Bennie Moten, Buster Moten) - 3:58
8. "Midnight Sun" (Sonny Burke, Lionel Hampton) - 3:10
9. "Contemporary Blues" - 4:09
10. "Don't Blame Me" (Jimmy McHugh, Dorothy Fields) - 2:58
11. "Twelfth Street Rag" (Euday L. Bowman) - 2:55
- Recorded at Contemporary's studio in Los Angeles on March 28, 1955 (tracks 3, 5 & 9) and July 26, 1955 (tracks 1, 2, 4, 6–8, 10 & 11).

== Personnel ==
- Barney Kessel - guitar
- Harry Edison - trumpet (tracks 2, 3 & 6–10)
- Georgie Auld (tracks 2, 6, 7 & 12), Bill Perkins (tracks 3, 5 & 9) - tenor saxophone
- Jimmy Rowles - piano
- Al Hendrickson - guitar
- Red Mitchell - bass
- Irv Cottler (tracks 1, 2, 4, 6–8, 10 & 11), Shelly Manne (tracks 3, 5 & 9) - drums
