= Swingin' the '20s =

Studio album by Benny Carter Quartet
- Released: 1959
- Recorded: November 2, 1958
- Studio: Contemporary Records Studio, Los Angeles, California
- Genre: Jazz
- Length: 45:16
- Label: Contemporary
- Producer: Lester Koenig

Benny Carter chronology
Jazz Giant (1958)	Swingin' the '20s (1959)	Aspects (1959)

Swingin' the '20s is an album by saxophonist Benny Carter's Quartet with pianist Earl Hines, recorded in 1958 and released on the Contemporary label.

== Reception ==
Professional ratings
Review scores
Source	Rating
AllMusic	2/5 stars
The Penguin Guide to Jazz	3/4 stars

At AllMusic, Scott Yanow wrote that "the results of this 1958 session are relaxed rather than explosive. Carter and Hines explore a dozen tunes with respect and light swing, but one wishes that there were a bit more competitiveness to replace some of the mutual respect". The Penguin Guide to Jazz commented, "The rhythm section was one of the best money could buy at the time", but that the album was "generally pretty bland".

== Track listing ==
1. "Thou Swell" (Richard Rodgers, Lorenz Hart) - 2:50
2. "My Blue Heaven" (Walter Donaldson, George A. Whiting) - 3:18
3. "Just Imagine" (Buddy DeSylva, Lew Brown, Ray Henderson) - 2:31
4. "If I Could Be with You (One Hour Tonight)" (James P. Johnson, Henry Creamer) - 2:40
5. "Sweet Lorraine" (Cliff Burwell, Mitchell Parish) - 5:00
6. "Who's Sorry Now?" (Ted Snyder, Bert Kalmar, Harry Ruby) - 2:23
7. "Laugh, Clown, Laugh" (Sam M. Lewis, Ted Fio Rito, Joe Young) - 2:24
8. "All Alone" (Irving Berlin) - 3:20
9. "Mary Lou" (J. Russel Robinson, Abe Lyman, George Waggner) - 2:50
10. "In a Little Spanish Town" (Mabel Wayne, Lewis, Young) - 3:12
11. "Someone to Watch over Me" (George Gershwin, Ira Gershwin) - 3:08
12. "A Monday Date" (Earl Hines) - 3:08
13. "Who's Sorry Now?" [alternate take] (Snyder, Kalmar, Ruby) - 2:44 Bonus track on CD reissue
14. "Laugh, Clown, Laugh" [alternate take] (Lewis, Fio Rito, Young) - 2:38 Bonus track on CD reissue
15. "All Alone" [alternate take] (Berlin) - 3:10 Bonus track on CD reissue

== Personnel ==
- Benny Carter – alto saxophone, trumpet (4, 8, & 11)
- Earl Hines – piano
- Leroy Vinnegar – double bass
- Shelly Manne – drums
