= West Coast Sound =

West Coast sound may refer to:

- Yacht rock, music style popular in the 1970s to 1980s
- California sound, pop music genre originating in the late-1960s
- West coast country, sub-genre of music developed in the late-1950s
- The West Coast Sound, a 1956 album by Shelly Manne & His Men
