= Sonny Rollins and the Contemporary Leaders =

1959 studio album by Sonny Rollins

Studio album by Sonny Rollins
- Released: August 1959
- Recorded: October 20–22, 1958
- Studio: Contemporary Studio, Los Angeles, California
- Genre: Jazz; hard bop; post-bop
- Length: 59:33
- Label: Contemporary
- Producer: Lester Koenig

Sonny Rollins chronology
Sonny Rollins at Music Inn (1958)	Sonny Rollins and the Contemporary Leaders (1959)	The Bridge (1962)

Sonny Rollins and the Contemporary Leaders is a 1959 album by jazz saxophonist Sonny Rollins, recorded for the Contemporary label, featuring performances by Rollins with Hampton Hawes, Barney Kessel, Leroy Vinnegar, and Shelly Manne, with Victor Feldman added on one track. It was the last studio record Rollins made in the 1950s. Following the recording, Rollins toured Europe in the spring of 1959, then took a hiatus from recording and performing in public that ended in 1962 with his LP The Bridge.

== Reception ==
Professional ratings
Review scores
Source	Rating
AllMusic	3/5 stars
The Rolling Stone Jazz Record Guide	4/5 stars
The Penguin Guide to Jazz Recordings	3/4 stars

The AllMusic review by Scott Yanow states: "The last of the classic Sonny Rollins albums prior to his unexpected three-year retirement features the great tenor... on an unusual but inspired list of standards. Rollins creates explorative and often witty improvisations.... Great music."

== Track listing ==
1. "I've Told Ev'ry Little Star" (Oscar Hammerstein II, Jerome Kern) – 5:28
2. "Rock-A-Bye Your Baby with a Dixie Melody" (Sam M. Lewis, Jean Schwartz, Joe Young) – 4:55
3. "How High the Moon" (Nancy Hamilton, Morgan Lewis) – 7:45
4. "You" (Harold Adamson, Walter Donaldson) – 4:16
5. "I've Found a New Baby" (Jack Palmer, Spencer Williams) – 3:40
6. "I've Found a New Baby" (alternate take) (Palmer, Williams) – 4:25
7. "Alone Together" (Howard Dietz, Arthur Schwartz) – 6:01
8. "In the Chapel in the Moonlight" (Billy Hill) – 6:41
9. "The Song Is You" (Hammerstein, Kern) – 5:44
10. "The Song Is You" (alternate take) (Hammerstein, Kern) – 6:11

== Personnel ==
- Sonny Rollins – tenor saxophone
- Hampton Hawes – piano (except track 3)
- Barney Kessel – guitar
- Leroy Vinnegar – bass
- Shelly Manne – drums (except tracks 3, 8)
- Victor Feldman – vibraphone (track 4)
