= The Three & The Two =

Studio album by Shelly Manne
- Released: 1954
- Recorded: "The Three" September 10, 1954; "The Two" September 14, 1954; Los Angeles, California
- Genre: Jazz
- Length: 48:38
- Label: Contemporary M3584
- Producer: Lester Koenig

Shelly Manne chronology
The Three & The Two (1954)	The West Coast Sound (1953-55)

The Three and The Two is an album by drummer Shelly Manne, featuring multi-instrumentalist Jimmy Giuffre, pianist Russ Freeman, and trumpeter Shorty Rogers. It was recorded at two sessions in 1954, originally released on two 10-inch LPs, and re-released in 1960 on a 12-inch LP on the Contemporary label.

== Background ==
The first session (The Three) features Manne on drums, Rogers on trumpet, and Giuffre on clarinet, tenor and baritone sax. The second session (The Two) features Manne on drums and Russ Freeman on piano.

The musicians had long experience playing alongside each other, and when the album was recorded were performing together in the West Coast group Shorty Rogers and His Giants. During live appearances, they often performed free improvisations, or unusual renditions of popular songs, as a trio or as a duo.

The sessions forming this record follow the same experimental approach, combining some original compositions and some re-interpretations of jazz standards, exploring different musical forms (including some reminding of European classical music), pursuing interplay and counterpoint, and researching new sound textures, as was often the case in Manne's work.

== Reception ==
Professional ratings
Review scores
Source	Rating
AllMusic	4.5/5 stars
The Penguin Guide to Jazz Recordings	3.5/4 stars
DownBeat	4/5 stars

The AllMusic review by Scott Yanow states: "Although these selections were not influential, they rank second in chronological order (behind Lennie Tristano's performances of 1949) among free jazz records. [...] Overall, a very interesting reissue".

DownBeat reviewer Leonard Feather assigned 4 stars to the release for The Two and 2 stars for The Three. Feather wrote, "I find the first side (The Three) almost completely unsatisfactory. It’s not just a matter of adjusting your ear to the odd instrumentation, for basically it’s a bad one . . . The best way to listen to The Two side is to think of it as a series of unaccompanied piano solos to which Shelly added a skillful supplementary role . . . it’s less experimental than The Three venture but far more gratifying in over-all musical terms. Individually and collectively, Russ and Shelly are at their consistently swinging best".

== Track listing ==
The Three

1. "Flip" (Shelly Manne) - 2:56
2. "Autumn in New York" (Vernon Duke) - 4:30
3. "Pas De Trois" (Jimmy Giuffre) - 4:35
4. "Three On A Row" (Shorty Rogers) - 5:08
5. "Steeplechase" (Charlie Parker) - 3:16
6. "Abstract N°1" (Jimmy Giuffre / Shelly Manne / Shorty Rogers) - 3:34

The Two

7. "The Sound Effects Manne" (Russ Freeman) - 4:00
8. "Everything Happens To Me" (Tom Adair / Matt Dennis) - 4:15
9. "Billie's Bounce" (Charlie Parker) - 4:07
10. "With A Song In My Heart" (Lorenz Hart / Richard Rodgers) - 3:46
11. "A Slight Minority" (Russ Freeman) - 3:22
12. "Speak Easy" (Russ Freeman) - 4:20
- Recorded at Contemporary's studio in Los Angeles on September 10, 1954 (tracks 1–6), and September 14, 1954 (tracks 7–12).

== Personnel ==
- Shelly Manne - drums
- Jimmy Giuffre (tracks 1–6) - clarinet, tenor saxophone, baritone saxophone
- Shorty Rogers (tracks 1–6) - trumpet
- Russ Freeman (tracks 7–12) - piano
