= Junie Cobb =

American jazz musician

Junius C. "Junie" Cobb (December 31, 1896 – January 3, 1970) was an American jazz multi-instrumentalist and bandleader.

Born in Hot Springs, Arkansas, United States, Cobb was competent on tenor saxophone, clarinet, banjo, piano, violin, and drums. He played with Johnny Dunn as a teenager, and after moving to Chicago he led his own ensemble in 1920-21 at the Club Alvadere. In the 1920s he played with King Oliver (1924–27) on banjo and with Jimmie Noone (1928–29). Following this Cobb put together another band of his own, and recorded with this ensemble for Vocalion and Victor. He played in Paris briefly in the early 1930s, then returned to lead groups in Chicago.

In 1946, he accompanied Annabelle Calhoun as a pianist, and played a number of extended engagements as a solo pianist. He went into semi-retirement in 1955, but played with Red Saunders in 1961 and Jasper Taylor in 1962.

In addition to his performing and bandleading activities, Cobb also composed; among his tunes is "Once or Twice", written in 1929. His brother, Jimmy, was a trumpeter who played on a number of Junie's recordings.

== Discography ==
- New Hometown Band (Riverside Records 415)

With Barney Kessel

- Music to Listen to Barney Kessel By (Contemporary, 1957)
