= Saturday Night at the Village Vanguard =

1979 live album by Art Pepper

Live album by Art Pepper
- Released: 1979
- Recorded: July 30, 1977
- Venue: Village Vanguard in NYC
- Genre: Jazz
- Length: 50:32
- Label: Contemporary S 7646
- Producer: Lester Koenig

Art Pepper chronology
Friday Night at the Village Vanguard (1977)	Saturday Night at the Village Vanguard (1979)	More for Les at the Village Vanguard (1977)

Saturday Night at the Village Vanguard is a live album by saxophonist Art Pepper, recorded at the Village Vanguard jazz club in 1977 and released on the Contemporary label.

== Reception ==
Professional ratings
Review scores
Source	Rating
AllMusic	4.5/5 stars
The Penguin Guide to Jazz Recordings	3/4 stars

The AllMusic review by Scott Yanow states: "The altoist was entering his peak period."

== Track listing ==
All compositions by Art Pepper except as indicated

1. "You Go to My Head" (J. Fred Coots, Haven Gillespie) - 11:35
2. "The Trip" - 12:25
3. "Cherokee" (Ray Noble) - 15:57
4. "For Freddie" - 10:35 Bonus track on CD reissue

== Personnel ==
- Art Pepper - alto saxophone, (tenor saxophone on Cherokee)
- George Cables - piano
- George Mraz - bass
- Elvin Jones - drums
