= Some Like It Hot (Barney Kessel album) =

Studio album by Barney Kessel
- Released: 1959
- Recorded: March 30 & 31, and April 3, 1959
- Studios: Contemporary Records Studio, Los Angeles, California
- Genre: Jazz
- Length: 48:49
- Label: Contemporary M3563/S7563
- Producer: Lester Koenig

Barney Kessel chronology
| Carmen (1958) | Some Like It Hot (1959) | Poll Winners Three! (1959) |

Some Like It Hot (subtitled Modern Jazz Performances of Songs featured in the Motion Picture starring Marilyn Monroe, Tony Curtis & Jack Lemmon Produced and Directed by Billy Wilder) is an album by guitarist Barney Kessel performing adaptations music from Billy Wilder's 1959 film Some Like It Hot, recorded in 1959 and released on the Contemporary label.

== Reception ==
Professional ratings
Review scores
| Source | Rating |
|---|---|
| Allmusic | 4.5/5 stars |
| The Penguin Guide to Jazz Recordings | 3/4 stars |

The Allmusic review by Scott Yanow states: "Such tunes as 'I Wanna Be Loved by You,' 'Runnin' Wild,' 'Down Among the Sheltering Palms,' and 'By the Beautiful Sea' are given fairly modern arrangements but still retain the flavor of the 1920s, and it's particularly interesting to hear Gordon and Pepper soloing on these ancient songs".

== Track listing ==
1. "Some Like It Hot" (Matty Malneck, I. A. L. Diamond) - 4:15
2. "I Wanna Be Loved by You" (Harry Ruby, Herbert Stothart, Bert Kalmar) - 3:37
3. "Stairway to the Stars" (Malneck, Mitchell Parish, Frank Signorelli) - 3:16
4. "Sweet Sue" (Victor Young, Will J. Harris) - 4:42
5. "Sweet Sue" [alternate take] (Young, Harris) - 4:48 Bonus track on CD reissue
6. "Runnin' Wild" (Arthur Gibbs, Joe Grey, Leo Wood) - 3:19
7. "Runnin' Wild" [alternate take] (Gibbs, Grey, Wood) - 6:31 Bonus track on CD reissue
8. "Sweet Georgia Brown" (Ben Bernie, Maceo Pinkard, Kenneth Casey) - 3:39
9. "Down Among the Sheltering Palms" (Abe Olman, James Brockman) - 4:01
10. "Sugar Blues" (Clarence Williams, Lucy Fletcher, Edgar Sampson) - 3:24
11. "I'm Thru with Love" (Malneck, Fud Livingston, Gus Kahn) - 3:14
12. "By the Beautiful Sea" (Harry Carroll, Harold R. Atteridge) - 3:10

== Personnel ==
- Barney Kessel - guitar
- Joe Gordon - trumpet (tracks 1, 2, 4-10 & 12)
- Art Pepper - alto saxophone, tenor saxophone, clarinet (tracks 1, 2, 4-10 & 12)
- Jimmy Rowles - piano (tracks 1, 2, 4-10 & 12)
- Jack Marshall - guitar (tracks 1, 2, 4-10 & 12)
- Monty Budwig - bass
- Shelly Manne - drums (tracks 1, 2, 4-10 & 12)
