= Poll Winners Three! =

Studio album by Barney Kessel, Shelly Manne & Ray Brown
- Released: 1960
- Recorded: November 2, 1959
- Studio: Contemporary Records Studio, Los Angeles, California
- Genre: Jazz
- Length: 38:33
- Label: Contemporary C3576/S7576
- Producer: Lester Koenig

Barney Kessel chronology
Some Like It Hot (1959)	Poll Winners Three! (1960)	Barney Kessel's Swingin' Party (1960)

Poll Winners Three! is an album by guitarist Barney Kessel with drummer Shelly Manne and bassist Ray Brown, recorded in 1959 and released on the Contemporary label. The album was the third of five to be released by the group.

== Reception ==
Professional ratings
Review scores
Source	Rating
Allmusic	4/5 stars
The Penguin Guide to Jazz Recordings	3.5/4 stars

The Allmusic review by Scott Yanow called it a "fairly typical but swinging straightahead set".

== Track listing ==
1. "Soft Winds" (Benny Goodman) - 4:14
2. "Crisis" (Barney Kessel) - 3:49
3. "The Little Rhumba" (Shelly Manne) - 3:41
4. "Easy Living" (Ralph Rainger, Leo Robin) - 3:20
5. "It's All Right with Me" (Cole Porter) - 3:41
6. "Mack the Knife" (Kurt Weill, Bertolt Brecht) - 3:53
7. "Rain Check" (Billy Strayhorn) - 3:07
8. "Minor Mystery" (Ray Brown) - 5:50
9. "I'm Afraid the Masquerade Is Over" (Herb Magidson, Allie Wrubel) - 4:34
10. "I Hear Music" (Burton Lane, Frank Loesser) - 2:53

== Personnel ==
- Barney Kessel - guitar
- Ray Brown - bass
- Shelly Manne - drums
