= Let's Cook! =

Studio album by Barney Kessel
- Released: 1962
- Recorded: August 6 and November 11, 1957
- Studio: Contemporary Records Studio, Los Angeles, California
- Genre: Jazz
- Length: 39:50
- Label: Contemporary M3603/S7603
- Producer: Lester Koenig

Barney Kessel chronology
The Poll Winners (1957)	Let's Cook! (1962)	The Poll Winners Ride Again! (1958)

Let's Cook! is an album by guitarist Barney Kessel recorded at sessions in 1957 but not released on the Contemporary label until 1962.

== Reception ==
Professional ratings
Review scores
Source	Rating
Allmusic	4/5 stars
The Penguin Guide to Jazz Recordings	3/4 stars

The Allmusic review by Scott Yanow states: "Throughout, Kessel keeps with the other all-stars, swinging hard while paying tribute to the legacy of Charlie Christian".

== Track listing ==
1. "Let's Cook" (Barney Kessel) - 11:18
2. "Time Remembered" (Vernon Duke) - 4:15
3. "Just in Time" (Jule Styne, Betty Comden, Adolph Green) - 4:57
4. "Tiger Rag" (Original Dixieland Jazz Band) - 9:50
5. "Jersey Bounce" (Tiny Bradshaw, Eddie Johnson, Bobby Plater, Buddy Feyne) - 9:30
- Recorded at Contemporary's studio in Los Angeles on August 6, 1957 (tracks 4 & 5) and November 11, 1957 (tracks 1–3)

== Personnel ==
- Barney Kessel - guitar
- Frank Rosolino - trombone (tracks 4 & 5)
- Ben Webster - tenor saxophone (tracks 4 & 5)
- Victor Feldman - vibraphone (tracks 1–3)
- Hampton Hawes (tracks 1–3), Jimmy Rowles (tracks 4 & 5) - piano
- Leroy Vinnegar - bass
- Shelly Manne - drums
