= Bud Shank Quartet at Jazz Alley =

Live album by Bud Shank Quartet
- Released: 1986
- Recorded: October 16, 17 & 18, 1986
- Venue: Jazz Alley, Seattle, WA
- Genre: Jazz
- Label: Contemporary; C 14027
- Producer: Richard Bock

Bud Shank chronology
That Old Feeling (1986)	Bud Shank Quartet at Jazz Alley (1986)	Serious Swingers (1987)

Bud Shank Quartet at Jazz Alley is a live album by saxophonist Bud Shank recorded in 1986 and released on the Contemporary label.

== Reception ==
Professional ratings
Review scores
Source	Rating
AllMusic	4/5 stars

Scott Yanow, writing for AllMusic, commented: "Shank is in top form, really stretching himself on the frequently challenging material. A good example of Bud Shank's playing in the 1980s".

== Track listing ==
All compositions by Bud Shank, except as indicated

1. "A Nightingale Sang in Berkeley Square" (Eric Maschwitz, Manning Sherwin) - 6:33
2. "Seaflowers" - 5:53
3. "Too Long at the Fair" (Billy Barnes) - 7:56
4. "Arion" - 5:22
5. "Song for Lady Lynn" - 9:30
6. "I Loves You Porgy" (George Gershwin, Ira Gershwin) - 4:56
7. "Wales" (Dave Peck) - 7:58
8. "Bud's Theme" - 2:04

== Personnel ==
- Bud Shank - alto saxophone
- Dave Peck - piano
- Chuck Deardorf - bass
- Jeff Hamilton - drums
