= That Old Feeling (Bud Shank album) =

Studio album by Bud Shank Quartet
- Released: 1986
- Recorded: February 17–18, 1986; Berkeley, California
- Genre: Jazz
- Label: Contemporary; C 14031
- Producer: Richard Bock

Bud Shank chronology
California Concert (1986)	That Old Feeling (1986)	Bud Shank Quartet at Jazz Alley (1986)

That Old Feeling is an album by saxophonist Bud Shank recorded in 1986 and released on the Contemporary label.

== Reception ==
Professional ratings
Review scores
Source	Rating
AllMusic	4.5/5 stars

Scott Yanow of Allmusic said "This modern bop set with pianist George Cables, bassist John Heard and drummer Tootie Heath finds Shank at his most passionate and creative, stretching out on jazz standards and an eccentric blues".

== Track listing ==
1. "Whisper Not" (Benny Golson) - 5:16
2. "Dream Dancing" (Cole Porter) - 5:52
3. "Cabin in the Sky" (Vernon Duke, John La Touche) - 7:38
4. "El Wacko" (Bud Shank) - 4:10
5. "No Moe" (Sonny Rollins) - 5:27
6. "I've Told Ev'ry Little Star" (Jerome Kern, Oscar Hammerstein II) - 5:07
7. "As Time Goes By" (Herman Hupfeld) - 5:10
8. "That Old Feeling" (Sammy Fain, Lew Brown) - 5:47

== Personnel ==
- Bud Shank - alto saxophone
- George Cables - piano
- John Heard - bass
- Albert Heath - drums
