= California Concert =

Album by Bud Shank

Live album by Bud Shank and Shorty Rogers
- Released: 1985
- Recorded: May 19, 1985
- Venue: Orange Coast College, Costa Mesa, CA
- Genre: Jazz
- Length: 46:03
- Label: Contemporary; C 14012
- Producer: Richard Bock

Bud Shank chronology
This Bud's for You... (1985)	California Concert (1985)	That Old Feeling (1986)

Shorty Rogers chronology
Back Again (1984)	California Concert (1985)	America the Beautiful (1991)

California Concert is a live album by saxophonist Bud Shank and flugelhornist Shorty Rogers recorded in 1985 and released on the Contemporary label.

== Reception ==
Professional ratings
Review scores
Source	Rating
AllMusic	4/5 stars
The Penguin Guide to Jazz Recordings	3/4 stars

Scott Yanow wrote in a review for AllMusic: "While Shank had advanced as an improviser (developing a wider range of expression and playing with more intensity than previously), Rogers' cool-toned style was largely unchanged".

== Track listing ==
All compositions by Shorty Rogers, except where indicated.

1. "It's Sand, Man!" (Ed Lewis) - 5:15
2. "Makin' Whoopee" (Walter Donaldson, Gus Kahn) - 6:11
3. "Kansas City Tango" - 5:28
4. "Ah-Leu-Cha" (Charlie Parker) - 5:05
5. "Echoes of Harlem" (Duke Ellington) - 9:18
6. "Mia" - 4:56
7. "Aurex" - 9:50

== Personnel ==
- Bud Shank - alto saxophone
- Shorty Rogers - fluegelhorn, arranger
- George Cables - piano
- Monty Budwig - bass
- Sherman Ferguson - drums
