= Chuck Deardorf =

American musician (1954–2022)

Chuck Deardorf (April 3, 1954 – October 9, 2022) was an American musician. He was best known for playing double bass and bass guitar with the Deardorf Peterson Group. He also headed the jazz department at the Cornish College of the Arts.

== Early life ==
Deardorf was born on April 3, 1954, and grew up in the Dayton metropolitan area. He started playing the double bass when he was fifteen. During his senior year of high school, he relocated to the West Coast and attended Central Kitsap High School. He then studied at the Evergreen State College, before playing at Seattle jazz clubs such as Parnell's and Dimitriou's Jazz Alley. There, he served as a backing musician to Zoot Sims, Monty Alexander, and Kenny Barron, among others.

== Career ==
Deardorf first taught music at Western Washington University in 1978. He then joined the faculty at the Cornish College of the Arts a year later as a professor of jazz and instrumental music. He ultimately became the administrator of the school's jazz program, serving in that capacity from 1986 until 2000.

Outside of teaching, Deardorf continued to perform and record as a sideman for musicians such as Jovino Santos Neto, Bud Shank, Don Lanphere, Dave Peck, and Pete Christlieb. He also played together with Dave Peterson, a local guitarist and composer, on a frequent basis starting in the late 1970s. The duo eventually established the Deardorf Peterson Group in 2004. They released Portal, their first album as co-bandleaders, that same year. Deardorf also released two albums as leader – Transparence (2011) and Perception (2019). He joked that he "play[ed] both kinds of music: country and western".

== Personal life and death ==
Deardorf married Kelly Harland in 1987. She is a singer and author, and he had produced and featured on several of her albums. They remained married for 35 years until his death. Together, they had one son.

Deardorf suffered from hereditary kidney disease. To avoid dialysis, he underwent a kidney transplant from his brother in 2011. He died on October 9, 2022, aged 68, at the Virginia Mason Medical Center in Seattle during the COVID-19 pandemic in Washington. He had contracted COVID-19 two months before his death, leading to health complications.

== Discography ==
=== As leader ===
- 2004 Portal (co-leader with Dave Peterson as The Deardorf/Peterson Group)
- 2011 Transparence
- 2019 Perception

=== As sideman ===
With Don Lanphere

- 1984 Don Loves Midge
- 1986 Stop
- 1988 Jay Clayton & Don Lanphere: TheJazz Alley Tapes
- 1990 Don Lanphere & Larry Coryell
- 1995 Go...Again
- 1999 Year 'Round Christmas

With Bud Shank

- 1990 Tales of the Pilot: Bud Shank Plays the Music of David Peck
- 1986 Bud Shank Quartet at Jazz Alley (Contemporary)
- 1992 The Awakening
- 1995 Lost Cathedral

With Dave Peck

- 1996 Solo
- 1998 Trio
- 1999 3 and 1

With Jovino Santos Neto

- 1997 Caboclo
- 2000 Live in Olympia
- 2003 Canto do Rio
- 2011 Current

With Gunnar Bob Madsen

- 1998 Power of a Hat
- 1998 Spinning World: 13 Ways of Looking at a Waltz

With Jim Knapp

- 1995 On Going Home
- 1998 Things for Now

With others

- 1989 Breaking Through, Phil Sheeran
- 1990 Worth Waiting For, P.J. Perry
- 1991 Living Things, Michael Tomlinson
- 1991 Pacific Aire, Tom Collier
- 1998 Collection, Mike Strickland
- 1998 Photographs, Barney McClure
- 1998 Red Kelley's Heroes, Pete Christlieb
- 1999 Joy to the World, Gene Nery
- 1999 The Face of Love, Eugene Maslov
- 2002 Twelve Times Romance, Kelly Harland
- 2003 Convergence Zone, Phil Kelly & the NW Prevailing Winds
- 2003 Some Devil, Dave Matthews
- 2005 Carolyn Graye, Carolyn Graye
- 2006 Laid Back & Blues: Live at the Sky Church in Seattle, Larry Coryell
- 2007 Malibu Manouche, Neil Andersson
- 2007 Shade, Richie Cole
- 2008 From the Depths, Karen Emerson
- 2008 Long Ago and Far Away: Kelly Harland Sings Jerome Kern, Kelly Harland
- 2008 Words & Music, Paul West
- 2009 Across the Sound, Terry Lauber
- 2009 Alone Together With the Blues, Mia Vermillion
- 2010 As the Crow Flies, Neil Andersson/Malibu Manouche/Peter Pendras
- 2010 Inner Mission, Randy Brecker/Richard Cole
- 2010 Reunion, Hadley Caliman/Pete Christlieb
- 2011 Imaginary Sketches, Chad McCullough/Bram Weijters
- 2012 Double Exposure, Frank D'Rone
