= Thursday Night at the Village Vanguard =

Live album by Art Pepper
- Released: 1979
- Recorded: July 28, 1977
- Venue: Village Vanguard in NYC
- Genre: Jazz
- Length: 58:07
- Label: Contemporary S 7642
- Producer: Lester Koenig

Art Pepper chronology
No Limit (1977)	Thursday Night at the Village Vanguard (1979)	Friday Night at the Village Vanguard (1977)

Thursday Night at the Village Vanguard is a live album by saxophonist Art Pepper, recorded at the Village Vanguard in 1977 and released on the Contemporary label.

== Reception ==
Professional ratings
Review scores
Source	Rating
AllMusic	4.5/5 stars
The Penguin Guide to Jazz Recordings	3.5/4 stars

The AllMusic review by Scott Yanow states: "Art Pepper's appearances at the Village Vanguard in 1977 were a major success, making the brilliance of the West Coast-based altoist obvious to the New York critics... the music is consistently stimulating and emotional".

== Track listing ==
All compositions by Art Pepper except as indicated

1. "Valse Triste" - 11:15
2. "Goodbye" (Gordon Jenkins) - 11:49
3. "Blues for Les" - 11:45
4. "My Friend John" - 9:21
5. "Blues For Heard" - 12:03 - CD Bonus Track

== Personnel ==
- Art Pepper - alto saxophone
- George Cables - piano
- George Mraz - bass
- Elvin Jones - drums
