= Urbane Jazz =

Studio album by Roy Eldridge and Benny Carter
- Released: 1955
- Recorded: March 21 & 23, 1955
- Venues: Radio Recorders, Hollywood
- Genre: Jazz
- Length: 50:48
- Labels: Verve; MGV 8202
- Producer: Norman Granz

Roy Eldridge chronology
Roy and Diz (1954)	Urbane Jazz (1955)	Swing Goes Dixie (1956)

Benny Carter chronology
New Jazz Sounds (1954)	Urbane Jazz (1955)	Jazz Giant (1958)

Urbane Jazz is an album by American jazz trumpeter Roy Eldridge and saxophonist Benny Carter recorded in 1955 and released on the Verve label.

== Reception ==
Professional ratings
Review scores
Source	Rating
AllMusic	4.5/5 stars

AllMusic awarded the album 4½ stars, stating: "This release features the swing-inflected trumpet of Roy Eldridge combined with the always cosmopolitan-sounding alto sax of the venerable Benny Carter. This combination was quite fortuitous because Eldridge took his main inspiration not from Louis Armstrong, but from saxophonists Carter and Coleman Hawkins, transposing that rapid arpeggio style and rich tone to his horn. This gave the trumpet player a keen awareness of harmony and unparalleled dexterity, especially in his solos."

== Track listing ==
All compositions by Roy Eldridge except as indicated

1. "I Still Love Him So" (Benny Carter) - 5:47
2. "The Moon Is Low" (Arthur Freed, Nacio Herb Brown) – 6:07
3. "I Missed My Hat" - 5:19
4. "Ballad Medley: I Remember You/Chelsea Bridge/I've Got the World on a String" (Victor Schertzinger, Johnny Mercer/Billy Strayhorn/Harold Arlen, Ted Koehler) - 6:20
5. "Polite Blues" - 8:36
6. "Close Your Eyes" (Bernice Petkere) - 2:40
7. "Where's Art" - 4:07
8. "I Don't Know" - 4:37
9. "Striding" - 4:37
10. "Wailing" - 3:14

== Personnel ==
- Roy Eldridge – trumpet, piano
- Benny Carter – alto saxophone
- Bruce McDonald – piano
- John Simmons – double bass
- Alvin Stoller – drums
