= Serious Swingers =

Studio album by Bud Shank and Bill Perkins
- Released: 1987
- Recorded: December 2–4, 1986
- Studios: Berkeley, California
- Genre: Jazz
- Length: 58:17
- Labels: Contemporary; C 14031
- Producer: Richard Bock

Bud Shank chronology
Bud Shank Quartet at Jazz Alley (1986)	Serious Swingers (1987)	Quiet Fire (1987)

Bill Perkins chronology
Remembrance of Dino’s (1986)	Serious Swingers (1987)	Right Chemistry (1987)

Serious Swingers is an album by saxophonists Bud Shank and Bill Perkins recorded in 1986 and released on the Contemporary label.

== Reception ==
Professional ratings
Review scores
Source	Rating
AllMusic	4/5 stars

Scott Yanow, writing for AllMusic stated: "the co-leaders are in excellent form on six underplayed standards and three group originals. The music swings hard without being overly predictable".

== Track listing ==
1. "Nictation" (Alan Broadbent) - 4:47
2. "As Sure as You're Born" (Alan Bergman, Johnny Mandel) - 6:49
3. "Blue in Green" (Miles Davis) - 6:46
4. "Out of This World" (Harold Arlen, Johnny Mercer) - 7:47
5. "Blazing Paddles" (Bud Shank) - 4:20
6. "Nu Blues for B B" (Bill Perkins) - 4:02
7. "C.T.A." (Jimmy Heath) - 5:10
8. "Don't Explain" (Billie Holiday, Arthur Herzog, Jr.) - 5:02
9. "Remember" (Irving Berlin) - 5:21
10. "Brazil" (Ary Barroso) - 8:13 Bonus track on CD

== Personnel ==
- Bud Shank - alto saxophone
- Bill Perkins - tenor saxophone
- Alan Broadbent - piano
- John Heard - bass
- Sherman Ferguson - drums
