= Something for Lester =

Studio album by Ray Brown
- Released: 1978
- Recorded: June 22–24, 1977
- Studio: Contemporary's Studio in Los Angeles, California
- Genre: Jazz
- Length: 41:10
- Label: Contemporary; S 7640
- Producer: John Koenig and Lester Koenig

Ray Brown chronology
As Good as It Gets (1977)	Something for Lester (1978)	Quadrant (1977)

Something for Lester is an album by American jazz bassist Ray Brown recorded in 1977 and released on the Contemporary label.

== Reception ==
Allmusic awarded the album 3½ stars with Scott Yanow noting "This excellent trio session forms a sort of transition between bassist Ray Brown's work with the Oscar Peterson Trio and his own small-group sessions of the '80s and '90s".

DownBeat fave the album 5 stars. Zan Stewart called the release a "very tasteful and extremely listenable album".

Professional ratings
Review scores
Source	Rating
Allmusic	3.5/5 stars
The Penguin Guide to Jazz Recordings	3/4 stars
DownBeat	5/5 stars

== Track listing ==
1. "Ojos de Rojo" (Cedar Walton) - 5:16
2. "Slippery" - 7:27 (Ray Brown)
3. "Something in Common" (Walton) - 4:50
4. "Love Walked In" (George Gershwin, Ira Gershwin) - 5:25
5. "Georgia on My Mind" (Hoagy Carmichael, Stuart Gorrell) - 7:11
6. "Little Girl Blue" (Richard Rodgers, Lorenz Hart) - 6:17
7. "Sister Sadie" (Horace Silver) - 4:54

== Personnel ==
- Ray Brown - bass
- Cedar Walton - piano
- Elvin Jones - drums
