= The West Coast Sound =

Studio album by Shelly Manne & His Men
- Released: 1956
- Recorded: April 6 and July 20, 1953 and September 13, 1955
- Studio: Contemporary Records Studio, Los Angeles, California
- Genre: Jazz
- Length: 36:18
- Label: Contemporary C3507
- Producer: Lester Koenig

Shelly Manne chronology
The Three & The Two (1954)	The West Coast Sound (1956)	Swinging Sounds (1956)

The West Coast Sound (subtitled Volume 1) is an album by drummer Shelly Manne's group Shelly Manne & His Men, recorded at sessions in 1953 and 1955 and released on the Contemporary label. The album features Manne's first recordings for Contemporary from 1953—eight tracks originally released on a 10-inch album—along with an additional four tracks from 1955.

== Reception ==
Professional ratings
Review scores
Source	Rating
AllMusic	5/5 stars
The Penguin Guide to Jazz Recordings	3/4 stars

The AllMusic review by Scott Yanow states: "the music has plenty of variety yet defines the era... Highly recommended and proof (if any is really needed) that West Coast jazz was far from bloodless".

== Track listing ==
1. "Grasshopper" (Shelly Manne) - 2:52
2. "La Mucura" (Traditional) - 3:02
3. "Summer Night" (Harry Warren, Al Dubin) - 3:19
4. "Afrodesia" (Shorty Rogers) - 3:30
5. "You and the Night and the Music" (Arthur Schwartz, Howard Dietz) - 3:10
6. "Gazelle" (Bill Russo) - 3:01
7. "Sweets" (Russo) - 2:53
8. "Spring Is Here" (Richard Rodgers, Lorenz Hart) - 2:43
9. "Mallets" (Shorty Rogers) - 3:26
10. "You're Getting to Be a Habit with Me" (Warren, Dubin) - 3:14
11. "You're My Thrill" (Burton Lane, Ned Washington) - 3:05
12. "Fugue" (Jimmy Giuffre) - 2:47
- Recorded at Contemporary's studio in Los Angeles on April 6, 1953 (tracks 2, 5, 6 & 9), July 20, 1953 (tracks 4, 7, 11 & 12), and September 13, 1955 (tracks 1, 3, 8 & 10).

== Personnel ==
Shelly Manne & His Men

- Shelly Manne - drums
- Bob Enevoldsen - valve trombone
- Joe Maini (tracks 1, 3, 8 & 10), Art Pepper (tracks 2, 5, 6 & 9), Bud Shank (tracks 4, 7, 11 & 12) - alto saxophone
- Bob Cooper (tracks 2, 4–7, 9, 11 & 12), Bill Holman (tracks 1, 3, 8 & 10) - tenor saxophone
- Jimmy Giuffre - baritone saxophone
- Russ Freeman (tracks 1, 3, 8 & 10), Marty Paich (tracks 2, 4–7, 9, 11 & 12) - piano
- Curtis Counce (tracks 2, 5, 6 & 9), Joe Mondragon (tracks 4, 7, 11 & 12), Ralph Peña (tracks 1, 3, 8 & 10) - bass
- Arrangements by Bob Enevoldsen (track 10), Jimmy Giuffre (track 12), Bill Holman (tracks 1 & 8), Marty Paich (tracks 3 & 11), Shorty Rogers (tracks 2, 4 & 9) and Bill Russo (tracks 5–7)
