= Stu Williamson =

American jazz musician

Stu Williamson (May 14, 1933 – October 1, 1991) was an American jazz trumpeter and valve trombonist. Born in Brattleboro, Vermont, Williamson was the younger brother of jazz pianist Claude Williamson.

In 1949, he moved to Los Angeles, where he worked with Stan Kenton, Woody Herman, Billy May, Charlie Barnet, and Shelly Manne. He worked often as a session musician until his retirement in 1968. He battled drug addiction for much of his life and died in Studio City, California in 1991.

== Discography ==
=== As leader ===
- 1955.01 - Stu Williamson Plays (Bethlehem, 1956) Originally titled Sapphire. Reissued in cd in 2013 by Solid Records Jap.
- 1956.01 - Stu Williamson (Bethlehem, 1956) Originally titled Pee Jay - Reissued in cd in 2013 by Solid Records Jap., and Fresh sound Records as The Trumpet Artistry Of Stu Williamson
- 1957.07 - A Jazz Band Ball (Mode, 1957) - issued under Jack Sheldon's name - Originally titled Revel Without a Pause, Stu Williamson plays valve trombone.

=== As sideman or guest ===
With Pepper Adams

- Pepper Adams Quintet (Mode, 1956)

With Clifford Brown's All Stars

- Jazz Messages
- Jazz Immortal (Pacific Jazz, 1956)

With Benny Carter

- Aspects (United Artists, 1959)

With Terry Gibbs

- Dream Band recorded 1959 (Contemporary, 1986)
- The Dream Band, Vol. 2: The Sundown Sessions recorded 1959 (Contemporary, 1987)
- Dream Band, Vol. 3: Flying Home recorded 1959 (Contemporary, 1988)
- The Exciting Terry Gibbs Big Band (Verve, 1961); reissued as Dream Band, Vol. 4: Main Stem (Contemporary, 1990)

With Dizzy Gillespie

- The New Continent (Limelight, 1962)

With Elmo Hope

- The Elmo Hope Quintet featuring Harold Land (Pacific Jazz, 1957)

With Stan Kenton

- This Modern World (Capitol, 1953)
- Kenton Showcase (Capitol, 1954)
- The Kenton Era (Capitol, 1940–54, [1955])
- Contemporary Concepts (Capitol, 1955)
- The Innovations Orchestra (Capitol, 1950-51 [1997])

With Mark Murphy

- Playing the Field (Capitol, 1960)

With Shelly Manne

- Swinging Sounds (Contemporary, 1956)
- More Swinging Sounds (Contemporary, 1956)
- Concerto for Clarinet & Combo (Contemporary, 1957)
- The Gambit (Contemporary, 1958)
- Manne–That's Gershwin! (Capitol, 1965)

With Jack Montrose

- Arranged by Montrose (Pacific Jazz, 1954)

With Lennie Niehaus

- Volume 1: The Quintets (Contemporary, 1955)
- Volume 2: The Octet, No. 1 (Contemporary, 1955)
- Volume 3: The Octet, No. 2 (Contemporary, 1956)
- Volume 4: The Quintets and Strings (Contemporary, 1956)
- Volume 5: The Sextet (Contemporary, 1957)

With Shorty Rogers

- An Invisible Orchard (RCA Victor, 1961 [1997])

With Pete Rugolo

- The Music from Richard Diamond (EmArcy, 1959)

With Howard Rumsey's Lighthouse All Stars

- Lighthouse All Stars vol. 6 (Contemporary, 1955)
- In the Solo Spotlight (Contemporary, 1955)

With Bud Shank

- Strings & Trombones (Pacific Jazz, 1955)

With Zoot Sims

- Quintet (Prestige, 1955) reissue Good Old Zoot (Status, 1965) (Prestige, 1970)

With Duane Tatro

- Jazz for Moderns (Contemporary, 1956)
