= This Bud's for You... =

Studio album by Bud Shank
- Released: 1985
- Recorded: November 14, 1984
- Studio: Classic Sound Studio, New York City
- Genre: Jazz
- Length: 33:03
- Label: Muse; MR 5309
- Producer: Bob Golden

Bud Shank chronology
Back Again (1984)	This Bud's for You... (1985)	California Concert (1985)

This Bud's for You... is an album by saxophonist Bud Shank which was released on the Muse label.

== Reception ==
Professional ratings
Review scores
Source	Rating
AllMusic	4.5/5 stars

Scott Yanow, writing for AllMusic, stated: "Bud Shank's playing from this recording forward surprised many listeners. There was a forcefulness and a passion to his alto solos (he had given up the flute) that had not been heard that much from him previously".

== Track listing ==
1. "I'll Be Seeing You" (Sammy Fain, Irving Kahal) - 4:57
2. "Nica's Dream" (Horace Silver) - 5:04
3. "Never Never Land" (Betty Comden, Adolph Green, Jule Styne) - 5:38
4. "Spacemaker" (Walter Norris) - 3:30
5. "Visa" (Charlie Parker) - 5:28
6. "Cotton Blossom" (Bud Shank) - 4:44
7. "Bouncing with Bud" (Bud Powell) - 4:10

== Personnel ==
- Bud Shank - alto saxophone
- Kenny Barron - piano
- Ron Carter - bass
- Al Foster - drums
