= Nights at the Vanguard =

Live album by Tommy Flanagan
- Released: 1987
- Recorded: October 18–19, 1986
- Venue: Village Vanguard, New York City, U.S.
- Genre: Jazz
- Label: Uptown
- Producer: Rudy Van Gelder

Tommy Flanagan chronology
Blues in the Closet (1983)	Nights at the Vanguard (1987)	Jazz Poet (1989)

Professional ratings
Review scores
Source	Rating
AllMusic	4/5 stars
The Penguin Guide to Jazz Recordings	3/4 stars

Nights at the Vanguard is an album by jazz pianist Tommy Flanagan, with bassist George Mraz and drummer Al Foster.

== Recording and music ==
The album was recorded on October 18–19, 1986, in concert at the Village Vanguard in New York City. Most of the material is not widely recorded, but it includes "More than You Know" and "All God's Chillun Got Rhythm".

== Track listing ==
1. Introduction – 1:52
2. "San Francisco Holiday" (Thelonious Monk) – 5:54
3. "Goodbye Mr. Evans" (Phil Woods) – 6:36
4. "Mark One" (Will Davis) – 6:16
5. "More Than You Know" (Edward Eliscu, Billy Rose, Vincent Youmans) – 5:33
6. "Out of the Past" (Benny Golson) – 7:26
7. "A Biddy Ditty" (Thad Jones) – 8:46
8. "While You Are Gone" (Lucky Thompson) – 4:23
9. "All God's Chillun Got Rhythm" (Walter Jurmann, Gus Kahn, Bronislaw Kaper) – 4:34
10. "I'll Keep Loving You" (Bud Powell) – 4:52
11. "Like Old Times" (Jones) – 6:34

== Personnel ==
- Tommy Flanagan – piano
- George Mraz – bass
- Al Foster – drums
