= Feeling Free (Barney Kessell album) =

Studio album by Barney Kessel
- Released: 1969
- Recorded: February 13, 1969
- Studio: Contemporary Record's Studio in Los Angeles, California
- Genre: Jazz
- Length: 43:05
- Label: Contemporary M3618/S7618
- Producer: Lester Koenig

Barney Kessel chronology
| Hair Is Beautiful (1968) | Feeling Free (1969) | Guitarra (1969) |

Feeling Free is an album by guitarist Barney Kessel recorded in 1969 and released on the Contemporary label. The album marked a brief return to the label before Kessel embarked on an extended stay in Europe.

== Reception ==
Professional ratings
Review scores
| Source | Rating |
|---|---|
| Allmusic | 4.5/5 stars |
| The Penguin Guide to Jazz Recordings | 3.5/4 stars |

The Allmusic review by Scott Yanow states: "Although none of the musicians was associated exclusively with the avant-garde (Elvin Jones came the closest but never quite embraced free jazz), they show the influence of the explorations of the era, using aspects of the innovations as a logical way to stretch the jazz mainstream. Fascinating music".

== Track listing ==
All compositions by Barney Kessel except as indicated

1. "Moving Up" - 5:14
2. "Blue Grass" - 9:24
3. "This Guy's in Love with You" (Burt Bacharach, Hal David) - 5:14
4. "Blues up, Down and All Around" - 8:21
5. "The Sound of Silence" (Paul Simon) - 7:39
6. "Two Note Samba" - 4:55

== Personnel ==
- Barney Kessel - guitar
- Bobby Hutcherson - vibraphone
- Chuck Domanico - bass
- Elvin Jones - drums
