= More for Les at the Village Vanguard =

Live album by Art Pepper
- Released: 1985
- Recorded: July 28–30, 1977
- Venue: Village Vanguard in NYC
- Genre: Jazz
- Length: 55:29
- Label: Contemporary C 7650
- Producer: Lester Koenig

Art Pepper chronology
Saturday Night at the Village Vanguard (1977)	More for Les at the Village Vanguard (1985)	San Francisco Samba (1977)

More for Les at the Village Vanguard is live album by saxophonist Art Pepper, recorded at the Village Vanguard in 1977 and released on the Contemporary label as the Volume Four of Pepper's Vanguard recordings.

== Reception ==
Professional ratings
Review scores
Source	Rating
Allmusic	4.5/5 stars
The Penguin Guide to Jazz Recordings	3/4 stars

The AllMusic review by Scott Yanow states: "The great altoist was clearly excited to be playing at the famous New York club, and his rhythm section -- pianist George Cables, bassist George Mraz and drummer Elvin Jones -- consistently stimulates his imagination".

== Track listing ==
All compositions by Art Pepper except as indicated

1. Introduction - 0:52
2. "No Limit" - 12:46
3. "These Foolish Things" (Jack Strachey, Harry Link, Holt Marvell) - 8:03
4. Introduction - 0:33
5. "More for Les" - 15:17
6. "Over the Rainbow" (Harold Arlen, Yip Harburg) - 6:37
7. "Scrapple from the Apple" (Charlie Parker) - 11:21 Bonus track on CD reissue

== Personnel ==
- Art Pepper - alto saxophone, tenor saxophone on "These Foolish Things", clarinet on "More for Les"
- George Cables - piano
- George Mraz - bass
- Elvin Jones - drums
