= Max Gordon (Village Vanguard founder) =

American jazz promoter (1903–1989)

- Gordon in 1983
- Born: March 12, 1903; Svir, Belarus
- Died: May 11, 1989 (aged 86); New York City, New York, U.S.
- Education: Reed College
- Occupation: Jazz club owner
- Known for: Jazz promotion Village Vanguard
- Website: villagevanguard.com

Max Gordon (March 12, 1903 – May 11, 1989) was an American jazz promoter and founder of the Village Vanguard jazz club in New York City.

== Life and career ==
Born in Svir, Russian Empire (now in Belarus) to a Jewish family, Gordon emigrated to the United States in 1908 at age five. The family settled in Portland, Oregon, where he later attended Reed College. As a young man, he was interested in Russian and French novels and saw himself as a romantic type. Pursuing his parents' wish that he become a lawyer, he moved to New York in 1926 to attend Columbia Law School, but began working in nightclubs and dropped out: "I learned to take my education where I could find it."

In 1932 Gordon opened his first venue, Village Fair, in the tradition of Viennese coffee houses as a place for artists and writers. He relocated the venue once in 1934 and opened the Village Vanguard in 1935. The Vanguard initially offered poetry and was frequented by poets Maxwell Bodenheim and Harry Kemp. Over time, the club segued into cabaret acts, comedy, folk music and jazz before going exclusively jazz in 1957. The club hosted a who's who of jazz greats from the 1940s to the 1980s including John Coltrane, Sidney Bechet, Dinah Washington, Albert Ayler, Miles Davis, Wynton Marsalis, Henry Threadgill and Thelonious Monk (at the time an unknown, discovered by Gordon's wife Lorraine). The club's artistic direction was in part guided by Lorraine who had a keen interest in jazz. Over time the club became a popular recording spot and over 100 jazz albums have been recorded there.

Gordon sought new talent and gave younger performers a platform to showcase their work. In doing so he played a role in helping launch the careers of Judy Holliday, Betty Comden, Adolph Green, Barbra Streisand, Pearl Bailey, Woody Allen, Dick Gregory, Lenny Bruce, Irwin Corey, Woody Guthrie, and Lead Belly. He had a reputation for fairness and honesty among the performers.

In addition to the Village Vanguard, in 1943 Gordon opened the Blue Angel Supper Club in midtown Manhattan and was involved in its operation for fourteen years. He actively managed the Vanguard club well into his 80s. In 1982, he authored a memoir titled Live at the Village Vanguard, which chronicles the history of the club.

Gordon died on May 11, 1989, at age 86. Subsequently Lorraine Gordon continued the work and took an active role in managing the Vanguard club.

== Bibliography ==
- Max Gordon (1982). Live at the Village Vanguard. Da Capo Press. ISBN 9780306801600.
