= Lorraine Gordon =

American jazz music advocate

- Gordon at the Village Vanguard, c. 2004
- Born: Lorraine Stein; October 15, 1922; Newark, New Jersey, U.S.
- Died: June 9, 2018 (aged 95); New York City, New York
- Occupation: Jazz club owner
- Known for: Jazz advocacy Village Vanguard
- Notable credit: NEA Jazz Master
- Website: villagevanguard.com

Lorraine Gordon (née Stein; October 15, 1922 – June 9, 2018) was an American jazz music advocate, the owner of the Village Vanguard jazz club in Greenwich Village, New York City, and the author of a memoir on jazz music.

== Life and career ==
Gordon grew up in Newark, New Jersey in a Jewish family and attended Newark Arts High School before transferring to Weequahic High School, from which she graduated in 1940. As a teenager, she was an ardent fan of jazz music.

In 1942, she married Alfred Lion, co-founder of Blue Note Records. In the 1940s, Gordon and Lion recorded the works of jazz artists such as the clarinetist Sidney Bechet and pianist Thelonious Monk. In 1949, she married Max Gordon, owner of the Village Vanguard club in New York. Established in 1935, the club gained a reputation among jazz musicians in the late 1950s and became a popular place to record live performances. The club's artistic direction was in part guided by her. In the 1960s, as a member of the peace activist group Women Strike for Peace, Gordon rallied against nuclear weapons testing and the Vietnam War. In the 1980s, she worked at the Brooklyn Museum. After Max Gordon's death in 1989, she assumed ownership and management of the Vanguard club. She continued the club's dedication to jazz music and maintained its reputation as a premier jazz club.

Gordon's autobiographical memoir, Alive at the Village Vanguard: My Life In and Out of Jazz Time, was published in 2006, and chronicles her lifelong involvement with jazz music. In it she wrote, "I didn't arrive at the Village Vanguard from out of the blue. I stuck to what I loved. That was my art. I'm not a musician; I'm not a singer; I'm not a painter; I'm not an actress. I'm none of those things. But throughout my life I followed the course of the music that I loved." The book received the ASCAP Deems Taylor Award for excellence in music print publishing.

In 2013, Gordon's contribution to jazz music was recognized by the U.S. National Endowment for the Arts, and she received the NEA Jazz Master Award for jazz advocacy. She actively engaged in the management of Vanguard club until late 2012. She died on June 9, 2018, at age 95.
