= Barney Kessel =

American jazz guitarist (1923–2004)

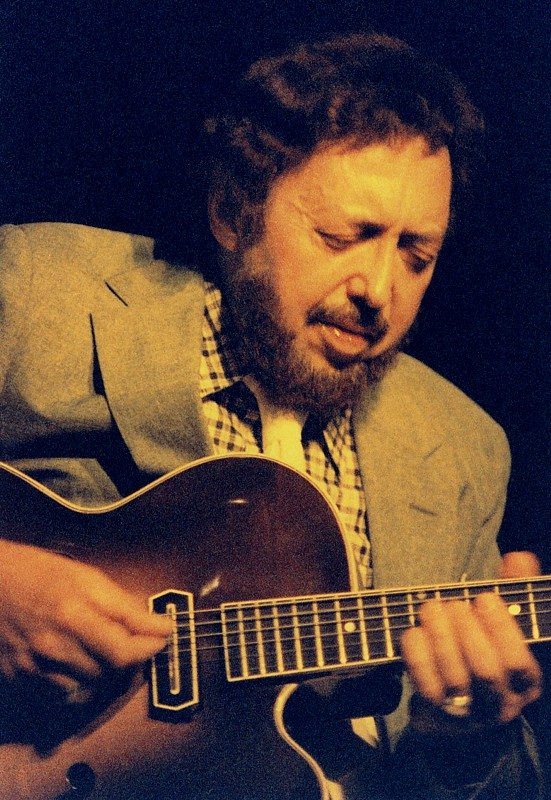

Background information
- Born: October 17, 1923; Muskogee, Oklahoma, U.S.
- Died: May 6, 2004 (aged 80) San Diego, California, U.S.
- Genres: Jazz, bebop, West coast jazz, cool jazz
- Occupations: Musician, composer
- Instrument: Guitar
- Years active: 1940s–1992
- Labels: Contemporary, Reprise, Black Lion, Concord Jazz, RCA Victor, Sonet, Savoy

Barney Kessel (October 17, 1923 – May 6, 2004) was an American jazz guitarist. Known in particular for his knowledge of chords and inversions and chord-based melodies, he was a member of many prominent jazz groups as well as a "first call" guitarist for studio, film, and television recording sessions. Kessel was a member of the group of session musicians informally known as the Wrecking Crew.

== Early life ==
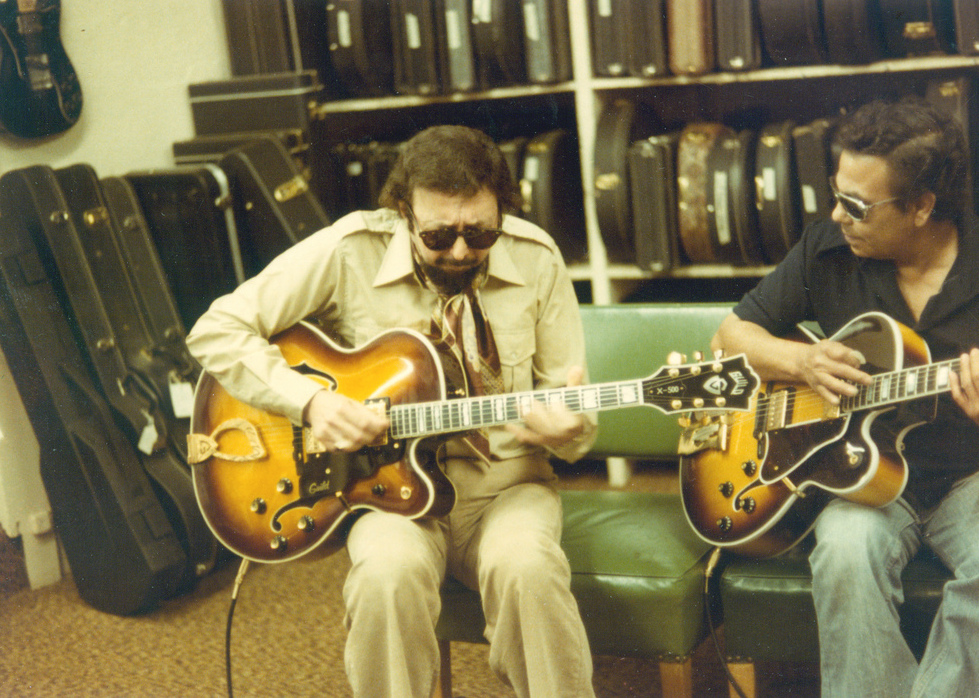

Kessel was born in Muskogee, Oklahoma in 1923 to a Jewish family. Kessel's father was an immigrant from Hungary who owned and operated a shoe shop. A self-taught guitarist, his only formal musical study was three months of guitar lessons at the age of 12.

== Career ==
He began his career as a teenager, touring with local swing bands. When he was 16, he started playing with the Oklahoma A&M band, Hal Price & the Varsitonians. The band members nicknamed him "Fruitcake" because he practiced in excess of 16 hours per day. Kessel gained recognition due in part to his youth, and in part to being the only white musician playing in all-African-American bands at black clubs.

In the early 1940s, he moved to Los Angeles, where for one year he was a member of the Chico Marx big band. Noticed by Norman Granz, he appeared in the 1944 film Jammin' the Blues, which featured Lester Young. Soon after, he played in the bands of Charlie Barnet and Artie Shaw. During the day, he worked as a studio musician and at night played bop-oriented jazz in clubs. In 1947, he recorded with Charlie Parker. He worked in Jazz at the Philharmonic and for one year in the early 1950s he was a member of the Oscar Peterson trio. After leaving the trio, he recorded several solo albums for Contemporary. He recorded a series of albums with Ray Brown and Shelly Manne as The Poll Winners because the three of them often won polls conducted by Metronome and DownBeat magazines. He was the guitarist on the album Julie Is Her Name (1955) by Julie London, which includes the standard "Cry Me a River", selling a million copies and demonstrated Kessel's chordal approach to guitar.

During the 1960s, Kessel worked for Columbia Pictures and was a member of a band of session musicians known as The Wrecking Crew. At one point, after a two and a half hour session to record a one-chord song, "The Beat Goes On," Kessel is reported to have stood up and proclaimed, "Never have so many played so little for so much." He recorded with pop acts such as The Monkees and The Beach Boys and with jazz musicians Sonny Rollins and Art Tatum. Kessel played the iconic opening notes of the acclaimed Beach Boys' Pet Sounds album, on the track "Wouldn't It Be Nice." He played a 12-string hybrid mando-guitar, plugged directly into the recording console, at Brian Wilson's request. Kessel eventually left studio work to concentrate on his jazz career both onstage and on records. Along with solo work, he formed the ensemble Great Guitars with Charlie Byrd and Herb Ellis.

Kessel was rated the No. 1 guitarist in Esquire, DownBeat, and Playboy magazine polls between 1947 and 1960.

From 1957 to 1958, Kay Musical Instrument Company manufactured the Kay Barney Kessel signature series guitars (models "Pro", "Artist" and "Jazz Special").

From 1961 to 1974, Gibson Guitars manufactured the Barney Kessel artist signature guitars in Standard and Custom models.

In 1986, Kessel (in partnership with Rumark Video Inc.) released the instructional series "Jazz Guitar Improvisation" on VHS. As of 2018, it has been made available by Rumark on YouTube for free.

== Artistry and equipment ==
Jazz music educator Wolf Marshall said the style that Barney Kessel employed in his music was "the natural outgrowth of the electric guitar tone fostered by Charlie Christian and embraced by virtually every exponent of the post-Christian school". Kessel's signature "warm, clean timbre" was created with hollow-body arch-top electric guitars with the neck pickup activated, played through a tube combo amp. The guitar stylings of Barney Kessel were rooted in 1930s and 1940s jazz, and were influenced by the swing and bebop styles of that time. Kessel was also influenced by post-bop modal jazz, hard bop, and free jazz. Specifically, he named Charlie Parker, Pat Martino, Oscar Peterson, Lester Young and Django Reinhardt as influences on his playing style. Additionally, Kessel's music had a strong blues influence "in both chord- and single-note form". Kessel was known for his chord stylings and single-note solos.

Throughout his career, Kessel's primary guitar was a sunburst Gibson ES-350P that was built in either 1947 or 1948, which the guitarist modified extensively. He replaced the original pickup with a "Charlie Christian" bar pickup, replaced the original volume and tone knobs with those taken off of a record player, omitted the pickguard, and installed dot inlays to replace the original fingerboard. Throughout his career, Kessel used various models of combo amplifiers made by Fender, Gibson and Univox. He used a heavy-gauge rounded pick and used medium-gauge Darco-wound polished guitar strings.

== Personal life ==
Kessel was married four times. His first marriage was to Gail Genovia Farmer during the 1950s and 1960s, with whom he had two sons, Dan and David Kessel. He was later married to singer and vocal contractor Betty Jane (BJ) Baker for 16 years, a union that ended in divorce in 1980. Following a ten-year marriage to Joanne “Jo” Kessel, he married his fourth wife, Phyllis Kessel, who remained with him for the final 12 years of his life.

His sons, Dan and David Kessel, became accomplished record producers and session musicians in their own right, working with prominent figures such as Phil Spector, John Lennon, and Leonard Cohen.

== Legacy and influence ==
Kessel is regarded as a pivotal figure in the evolution of jazz guitar, noted for his sophisticated chordal vocabulary and seamless integration of bebop language into the instrument's repertoire. His work with the "Poll Winners" trio and the Wrecking Crew solidified his reputation as one of the most versatile guitarists in American music history.

- In 1999, he was inducted into the Oklahoma Jazz Hall of Fame, recognizing his contributions to the genre.
- He consistently topped the DownBeat, Metronome, and Playboy jazz polls throughout the 1950s.
- His signature Gibson and Kay guitar models remain highly sought after by jazz guitarists and collectors for their unique tonal characteristics.

== Death ==
Kessel was in poor health after suffering a stroke in 1992, which effectively ended his career. 12 years later, he died from a brain tumor at his home in San Diego, California on May 6, 2004 at the age of 80.

== Discography ==
=== As leader ===
- Easy Like: Barney Kessel, volume 1 (Contemporary, 1954)
- Barney Kessel, volume 2 (Contemporary, 1954)
- To Swing or Not to Swing: Barney Kessel, volume 3 (Contemporary, 1955)
- Kessel Plays Standards (Contemporary, 1956)
- Easy Like (Contemporary, 1956)
- Music to Listen to Barney Kessel By (Contemporary, 1957)
- The Poll Winners with Shelly Manne, Ray Brown (Contemporary, 1957)
- The Poll Winners Ride Again! with Shelly Manne, Ray Brown (Contemporary, 1958)
- Modern Jazz Performances from Bizet's Opera Carmen (Contemporary, 1959)
- Some Like It Hot (Contemporary, 1959)
- Poll Winners Three! with Shelly Manne, Ray Brown (Contemporary, 1960)
- Exploring the Scene! with Shelly Manne, Ray Brown (Contemporary, 1960)
- Bossa Nova Plus Big Band (Reprise, 1961)
- El Tigre with Harold Land (Charlie Parker, 1962)
- Let's Cook! (Contemporary, 1962)
- Breakfast At Tiffany's (Reprise, 1962)
- Barney Kessel's Swingin' Party (Contemporary, 1963)
- Contemporary Latin Rhythms (Reprise, 1963)
- On Fire (Emerald, 1965)
- Kessel's Kit (RCA Victor, 1969)
- Reflections in Rome (RCA Victor, 1969)
- Hair Is Beautiful (Atlantic, 1969)
- Feeling Free (Contemporary, 1969)
- What's New... Barney Kessel? (Mercury, 1969)
- Guitarra (RCA Camden, 1970)
- Swinging Easy! (Black Lion, 1971)
- I Remember Django with Stephane Grappelli (Black Lion, 1971)
- Limehouse Blues with Stephane Grappelli (Freedom, 1972)
- Summertime in Montreux (Black Lion, 1973)
- Easy Moments with Carlo Pes (Gemelli, 1973)
- Two Way Conversation with Red Mitchell (Sonet, 1974)
- Barney (& Friends) Plays Kessel (Concord Jazz, 1975)
- Just Friends (Sonet, 1975)
- Blue Soul (Black Lion, 1975)
- Great Guitars with Charlie Byrd and Herb Ellis (Concord Jazz, 1975)
- The Poll Winners: Straight Ahead with Ray Brown, Shelly Manne (Contemporary, 1975)
- Poor Butterfly with Herb Ellis (Concord Jazz, 1977)
- Soaring (Concord Jazz, 1977)
- Live at Sometime (Trio, 1977)
- A Tribute to the Great Hollywood Stars with Junko Mine (Trio, 1977)
- By Myself (Victor, 1977)
- Great Guitars at the Winery with Charlie Byrd and Herb Ellis (Concord Jazz, 1980)
- Jellybeans with Bob Maize and Jimmie Smith (Concord Jazz, 1981)
- Solo (Concord Jazz, 1983)
- Great Guitars at Charlie's Georgetown (Concord Jazz, 1983)
- Spontaneous Combustion with Monty Alexander (Contemporary, 1987)
- Red Hot and Blues (Contemporary, 1988)
- Autumn Leaves (Black Lion, 1989)
- Great Guitars Live with Charlie Byrd and Herb Ellis (Concord 2001)
- Live at the Jazz Mill 1954 (Modern Harmonic, 2016)
- Live at the Jazz Mill 1954 Vol. 2 (Modern Harmonic, 2018)

=== As sideman ===
With The Beach Boys

- The Beach Boys Today! (Capitol Records, 1965)
- Pet Sounds (Capitol Records, 1966)

With Benny Carter

- Alone Together (Norgran, 1955)
- Cosmopolite (Norgran, 1956)
- Jazz Giant (Contemporary, 1958)
- Aspects (United Artists, 1959)

With The Coasters

- Riot in Cell Block Number 9 (Spark Records, 1954)
- One Kiss Led to Another (Atco, 1956)
- Down in Mexico (Atco, 1956)
- Young Blood (Atco, 1957)
- Searchin' (Atco, 1957)

With Sam Cooke

- Night Beat (RCA Victor, 1963)
- Ain't That Good News (RCA, 1964)

With Buddy DeFranco

- Generalissimo (Verve, 1959)
- Live Date (Verve, 1959)
- Bravura (Verve, 1959)
- Wailers (Verve, 1960)

With Harry Edison

- Sweets (Clef, 1956)
- Gee Baby, Ain't I Good to You (Verve, 1957)

With Billie Holiday

- Billie Holiday Sings (Clef, 1952)
- Billie Holiday (Clef, 1953)
- Billie Holiday (Clef, 1954)
- Billie Holiday at JATP (Clef, 1954)
- Music for Torching (Clef, 1956)
- Velvet Mood (Clef, 1956)
- Lady Sings the Blues (Clef, 1956)
- Body and Soul (Verve, 1957)
- Songs for Distingué Lovers (Verve, 1957)
- All or Nothing at All (Verve, 1958)

With Peggy Lee

- Things Are Swingin' (Capitol, 1958)
- I Like Men! (Capitol, 1959)
- Jump for Joy (Capitol, 1959)
- Then Was Then – Now Is Now! (Capitol, 1965)

With Dean Martin

- Dream with Dean (Reprise, 1964)

With Anita O'Day

- This Is Anita (Verve, 1956)
- Pick Yourself Up with Anita O'Day (Verve, 1957)
- Anita Sings the Winners (Verve, 1958)
- Anita O'Day Swings Cole Porter with Billy May (Verve, 1959)
- Trav'lin' Light (Verve, 1961)

With Oscar Peterson

- The Oscar Peterson Quartet (Verve, 1955)
- Romance: The Vocal Styling of Oscar Peterson (Verve, 1956)

With Lou Rawls

- Too Much! (Capitol, 1967)

With Shorty Rogers

- Martians Come Back! (Atlantic, 1956)
- Way Up There (Atlantic, 1957)
- Chances Are It Swings (RCA Victor, 1958)
- The Wizard of Oz and Other Harold Arlen Songs (RCA Victor, 1959)

With The Ronettes

- Presenting the Fabulous Ronettes (Philles, 1964)

With Pete Rugolo

- Out on a Limb (EmArcy, 1956)
- An Adventure in Sound: Reeds in Hi-Fi (Mercury, 1958)
- An Adventure in Sound: Brass in Hi-Fi (Mercury, 1958)

With Sonny & Cher

- Look at Us (Atco Records, 1965)
- In Case You're in Love (Atlantic Records, 1967)

With others

- Georgie Auld, In the Land of Hi-Fi with Georgie Auld and His Orchestra (EmArcy, 1955)
- Frankie Avalon, ...And Now About Mr. Avalon (Chancellor, 1961)
- Louis Bellson, Skin Deep (Norgran, 1953)
- Chet Baker, Albert's House (Beverly Hills, 1969)
- Johnny Burnette, Roses Are Red (Liberty, 1962)
- Cher, All I Really Want to Do (EMI Records, 1965)
- Roy Clark, Stringing Along with the Blues (Capitol, 1966)
- Buddy Collette, Man of Many Parts (Contemporary, 1956)
- Sonny Criss, Go Man (Imperial, 1956)
- Bobby Day, Rockin' With Robbin (Class, 1959)
- Sylvia Telles, Sylvia Telles U.S.A. (Philips, 1961)
- Dion DiMucci, Born to Be with You (Collectables, 1975)
- Roy Eldridge, Dale's Wail (Clef, 1953)
- Ella Fitzgerald, Ella Fitzgerald Sings the Cole Porter Songbook (Verve, 1956)
- Sam Fletcher, Sam Fletcher Sings "I Believe In You" (Vee-Jay, 1964)
- The Four Freshmen, The Four Freshmen and Five Guitars (Capitol, 1959)
- The Four Freshmen, More Four Freshmen and 5 Trombones (Capitol, 1964)
- Wardell Gray, Dexter Gordon, Sonny Criss, Jazz Concert West Coast (Savoy, 1956)
- Hampton Hawes, Four! (Contemporary, 1958)
- Woody Herman, Songs for Hip Lovers (Verve, 1957)
- Milt Jackson, Ballads & Blues (Atlantic, 1956)
- Gene Krupa and Buddy Rich, The Drum Battle (Verve, 1960)
- Julie London, Julie Is Her Name (Liberty, 1955)
- Oliver Nelson, Soulful Brass (Impulse!, 1968)
- Art Pepper and Zoot Sims, Art 'n' Zoot (Pablo, 1995)
- Jane Powell, Can't We Be Friends? (Verve, 1956)
- The Righteous Brothers, Back to Back (Philles, 1965)
- Sonny Rollins, Sonny Rollins and the Contemporary Leaders (Contemporary, 1958)
- Chan Romero, Hippy Hippy Shake (Del-Fi 45, 1959)
- Evie Sands, Any Way That You Want Me (Rev-Ola, 1970)
- Mel Tormé, Back in Town (Verve, 1959)
- Mel Tormé, That's All (Columbia, 1965)
- Mel Tormé, A Day in the Life of Bonnie and Clyde (Liberty, 1968)
- Ike & Tina Turner, River Deep – Mountain High (A&M, 1966)
- Joe Williams, With Love (Temponic, 1972)

== Bibliography ==
- Kessel, Barney; Almeida, Laurindo; Heitmeyer, Howard; Hendrickson, Al; Pitman, Bill; Bain, Bob; Marshall, Jack; Roberts, Howard (1961). West Coast Guitar: Eight Original Solos for Guitar. New York: Leeds Music Corporation. ASIN B0080YPG16. OCLC 79391800.
- Kessel, Barney (1992). The Jazz Guitar Artistry of Barney Kessel: Guitar Solo. Ashley Mark Publishing. ISBN 978-0793516438.
- Kessel, Barney (1997). The Jazz Guitar Artistry of Barney Kessel, Vol. 2. Ashley Mark Publishing. ISBN 978-0793587056.
- Kessel, Barney (2000). The Jazz Guitar Artistry of Barney Kessel, Vol. 3. Ashley Mark Publishing. ISBN 978-0634023231.
- Summerfield, Maurice J.; Kessel, Barney (2008). Barney Kessel: A Jazz Legend. Ashley Mark Publishing. ISBN 978-1872639697.
- Marshall, Wolf; Kessel, Barney (2009). Barney Kessel: A Step-by-Step Breakdown of His Guitar Styles and Techniques. Hal Leonard Corporation. ISBN 978-1423430476.
