= Village Vanguard =

Jazz club in New York City

Coordinates: 40°44′9.6″N 74°0′5.8″W

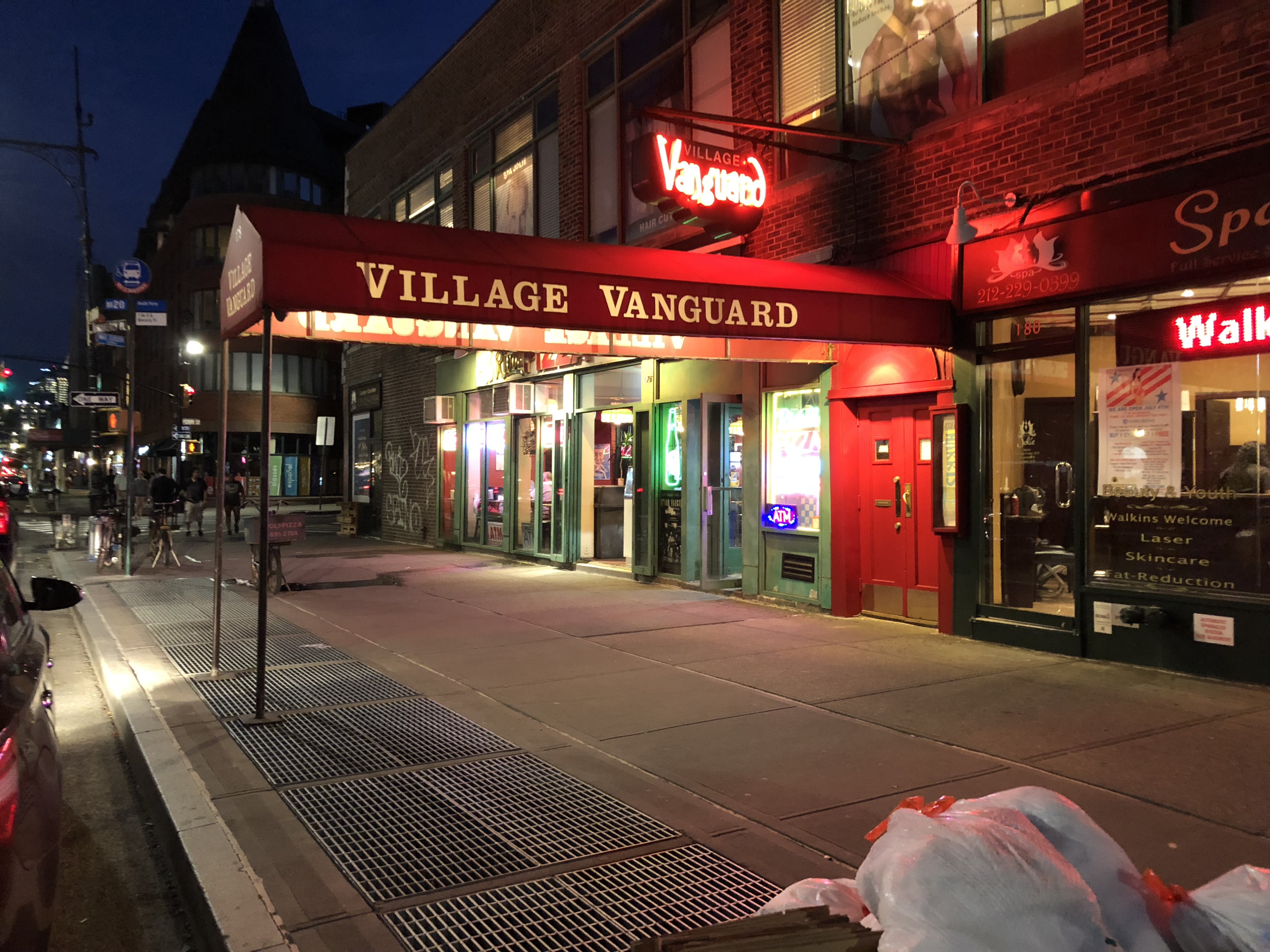
The Village Vanguard in New York City, 2018

The Village Vanguard is a jazz club at Seventh Avenue South in Greenwich Village, New York City. The club was opened on February 22, 1935, by Max Gordon. Originally, the club presented folk music and beat poetry, but it became primarily a jazz music venue in 1957. It has hosted many highly renowned jazz musicians since then, and today is the oldest operating jazz club in New York City.

== History ==
=== Early years ===
Max Gordon opened the Village Vanguard in 1934 on Charles Street and Greenwich Avenue in Manhattan, New York City. He intended it to be a forum for poets and artists as well as a site for musical performances. Due to insufficient facilities, Gordon was refused a cabaret license from the police department and was unable to create the club that he envisioned. In his autobiography he wrote: "I knew if I was ever to get anywhere in the nightclub business, I'd have to find another place with two johns, two exits, two hundred feet away from a church or synagogue or school, and with the rent under $100 a month." In 1934, he moved his business and purchased the Golden Triangle, a speakeasy at 178 Seventh Avenue South.

The Golden Triangle opened its doors in 1935. The Golden Triangle's basement facility structure resembled that of an isosceles triangle. After purchasing the property, Gordon changed the name of the club to the Village Vanguard.

Like its prototype on Charles Street, the Vanguard was dedicated to poetry readings and folk music. During the 1930s and 1940s, visitors to the club heard poetry read by Maxwell Bodenheim and Harry Kemp, blues and folk music by Lead Belly, and Caribbean calypso by the Duke of Iron. Painters discussed the Spanish Civil War between walls dotted with political posters. Comedians such as Phil Leeds performed stand-up routines.

=== Jazz ===
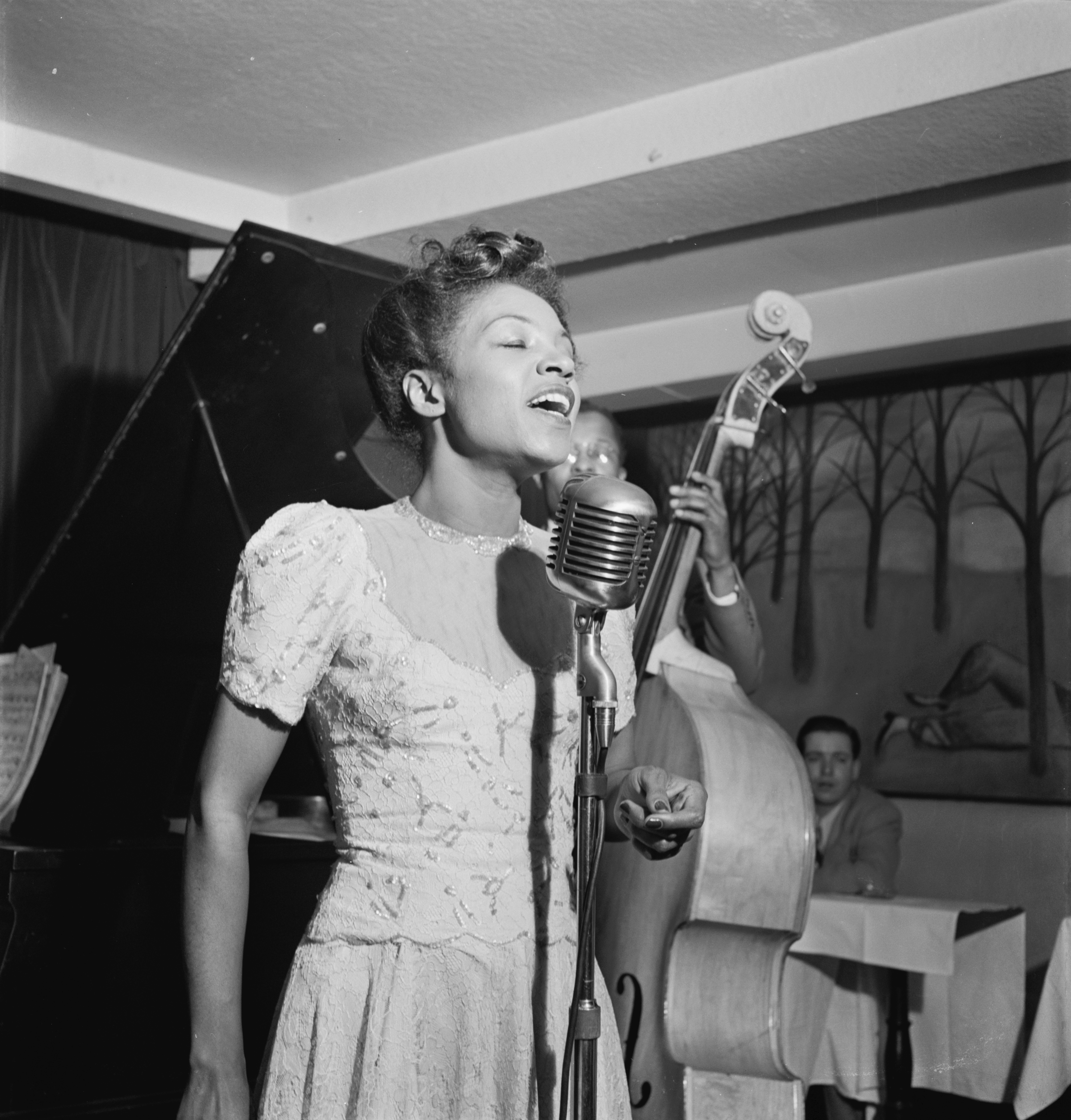
Maxine Sullivan, March 1947

Lorraine Gordon, Max Gordon's wife, wrote: "The biggest reason my pals and I went to the Vanguard, though, was because there were jazz jam sessions in the afternoons on Sundays. You could go hear Lester Young, Ben Webster, all the greatest jazz musicians for fifty cents at the door, or something like that." Although jazz was not yet the main attraction at the club, the Vanguard was a haven for small swing groups. In the 1930s and 1940s, Sidney Bechet, Una Mae Carlisle, Art Hodes, and Mary Lou Williams performed at the Vanguard. According to Lorraine Gordon, "in time, Max began to book acts, often three a night. Many proved to be high-caliber jazzmen." In 1940, Roy Eldridge performed at the Vanguard. His performance and his dedicated fans raised the possibility that jazz could be the main attraction. As bebop developed in the 1940s, small groups began to dominate the Vanguard. College students and artists in Greenwich Village took an interest in jazz. In 1940, a resident trio was formed by Eddie Heywood, Zutty Singleton, and Jimmy Hamilton.

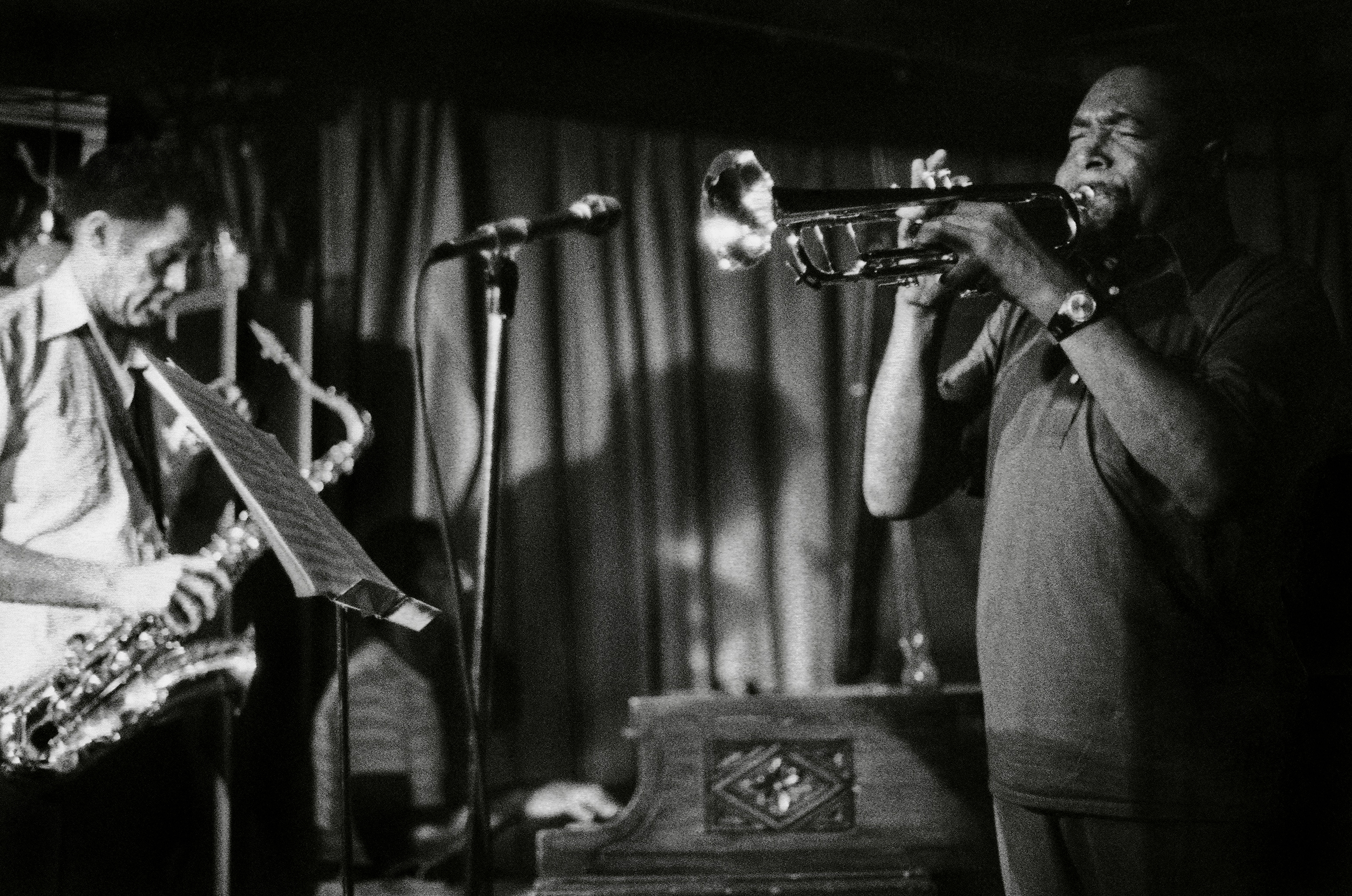
Dexter Gordon and Benny Bailey in 1977

By 1957, as one commentator writes, "Gordon reversed his policy, putting jazz at the top of the bill and letting the folknicks…and the comics…fill it out. Thus the Vanguard booked Miles Davis, Horace Silver, Thelonious Monk, Gerry Mulligan, the Modern Jazz Quartet, Jimmy Giuffre, Sonny Rollins, Anita O'Day, Charlie Mingus, Bill Evans (a regular), Stan Getz, Carmen McRae."

The booking of Monk demonstrated the Vanguard's ability to take a relatively unknown musician and help launch their career. The story began with the first ever encounter between Max and Lorraine, who met in the Bluebell Bakery, a "homey little Fire Island joint." After Lorraine walked in and spotted Max (whom she knew to be the Vanguard's owner), she proposed that he showcases Monk at the club for a week. Max agreed and on September 14, 1948, Monk opened at the Vanguard. The reception was not ideal. "[N]obody came. None of the so-called jazz critics. None of the so-called cognoscenti. Zilch." But Lorraine continued to sponsor Monk as a genius and, through her persistence, helped him grow into the pillar of jazz he became.

From the 1950s on, the Vanguard was the leading small venue for jazz, launching many celebrated careers and sustaining others that were already aloft. The Thad Jones–Mel Lewis Orchestra that eventually became the Vanguard Jazz Orchestra played on Monday nights between 1966 and 1990.

Max Gordon died on May 11, 1989. The day after, Lorraine closed the Vanguard; the following day, she reopened it and continued to run the place. On June 9, 2018, Lorraine Gordon died of a stroke at age 95.

== Recordings ==
The Vanguard helped start many careers and has hosted many recordings that are regarded as masterpieces in its basement, making it now a club of international renown. On 3 November 1957, during some of the first recording sessions at the club, Sonny Rollins, a tenor sax player, recorded three LPs. These recordings were at the forefront of the hard-bop movement. The LPs documented two different saxophone-bass-drums trios. Rollins had shown an interest in smaller ensembles as early as 1955; in Paradox, he exchanged four-measure phrases with drummer Max Roach, with no other instrument taking part. In the Vanguard recordings we hear similar styles in arrangements. In the song "Old Devil Moon", Rollins is accompanied only by a bassist and a drummer. Musically, this song set the standard for the piano-less trio. Following Rollins, recordings continued; The Gerry Mulligan Concert Jazz Band performed and recorded there in December 1960 after returning from a European Tour. Then there was John Coltrane's and Bill Evans's Vanguard titles, both from 1961 (Evans was extensively recorded at the Village Vanguard just three months before his death in 1980). Coltrane's album was five titles taken from 22 recorded songs over four nights at the Vanguard. In 1962 The Cannonball Adderley Sextet in New York was released. The Thad Jones/Mel Lewis Orchestra performed every Monday Night beginning in 1965, recording several times, and in 1976 hosted Dexter Gordon's "Homecoming" performance with Woody Shaw. Rahsaan Roland Kirk performed several shows at the Vanguard in May 1970 that were compiled for his album Rahsaan Rahsaan. During the same year and only four months apart, Pat Patrick and Thelonious Monk played together at the Village Vanguard.

Other recordings include Art Pepper's Thursday Night at the Village Vanguard (1977), Tommy Flanagan's Nights at the Vanguard (1986), Vincent Herring's Folklore: Live at the Village Vanguard (1993), and Wynton Marsalis's seven-disc Live at the Vanguard (1999). "The words 'Live at the Village Vanguard' do have a direct and positive influence on an album's sales", said Bruce Lundvall, president of Blue Note, a jazz label with more than a dozen "Live at the Vanguard" titles in its catalog. Joe Henderson's influential The State of the Tenor, Vols. 1 & 2 was recorded in the Vanguard in 1985.

In 2013, Ravi Coltrane, the son of John Coltrane, performed at the Village Vanguard.

Singer Cécile McLorin Salvant recorded many of the songs from her album Dreams and Daggers live at the Vanguard. The album won a Grammy Award for Best Jazz Vocal Album in 2018.

== See also ==
- Live at the Village Vanguard
- List of jazz clubs
