= Lester Koenig =

American screenwriter and music industry executive

- Born: December 3, 1917; New York City, New York, U.S.
- Died: November 21, 1977 (aged 59); Los Angeles, California, U.S.
- Education: B.A. Dartmouth College
- Spouse(s): Catharine Anliss Heerman (divorced); Joy Bryan
- Children: 4
- Parent(s): Minna Harlib Koenig; Morris Koenig
- Family: Julian Koenig (brother); John Koenig (son); Victoria Koenig (daughter); Pauline Koenig Porter (niece); John Koenig (nephew); Antonia Koenig (niece); Sarah Koenig (niece)

Lester Koenig (December 3, 1917 – November 21, 1977) was an American screenwriter, film producer, and founder of the jazz record label Contemporary Records.

== Biography ==
Koenig was born to a Jewish family in New York City, the son of Minna (Harlib) and Morris Koenig. His father was a judge; his brother was advertising executive Julian Koenig. As a child, he collected records and was introduced to the record producing business by John H. Hammond who served as his mentor. He attended Dartmouth College where he was friends with Budd Schulberg, son of B.P. Schulberg, the head of production at Paramount film studios. After Dartmouth, he attended Yale Law School but was forced to drop out after his father's death. In 1936, he then went to work for Martin Block on the Make Believe Ballroom radio show at Milton H. Biow's WNEW in New York City. In 1937, B.P. Schulberg offered him a job as a writer at Paramount Studios and he moved to Los Angeles. In Los Angeles, leveraging his experience with John Hammond, he was hired by David Stuart and his wife, Marili Morden – the owners of the Jazz Man Record Shop which was adjacent to Paramount Studios – to produce some records under Stuart's Jazz Man Records label. In 1941, Koenig recorded Lu Watters which he followed on with Bob Scobey and Turk Murphy. World War II interrupted his career and he served in a Signal Corps film unit of the United States Army Air Corps where he wrote the war documentary films, Memphis Belle: A Story of a Flying Fortress (1944) and Thunderbolt (1947), both directed by then-Major William Wyler. He continued to work with Wyler after the war, taking important production roles in The Best Years of Our Lives, The Heiress, Carrie, Detective Story, and Roman Holiday. In the early 1950s, Koenig was blacklisted by the House Un-American Activities Committee as a result of which some of his production credits were excised.

He decided to return to record producing with Jazz Man Records but when he returned to Los Angeles, he found that Stuart and Morden had divorced and she had since remarried to Nesuhi Ertegun, the founder of Crescent Records; instead Koenig founded his own label, Good Time Jazz Records. In 1952, Ertegun sold him the Jazz Man label (Crescent Records had been merged into Jazz Man) and then Ertegun went to work for Koenig at Good Time Jazz Records. In 1951, Koenig founded Contemporary Records, where he produced albums by such jazz figures as Sonny Rollins, Ornette Coleman, Art Pepper, Barney Kessel, Benny Carter, Phineas Newborn, Jr., Hampton Hawes, Harold Land, Woody Shaw, Shelly Manne, Ben Webster, Ray Brown, Andre Previn, Howard McGhee. Teddy Edwards, Red Mitchell, Victor Feldman, Helen Humes, The Curtis Counce Group Sonny Simmons, Art Farmer, Leroy Vinnegar, The Lighthouse All-Stars and others.

== Personal life ==
In 1948, he married artist Catharine Anliss Heerman, who was the daughter of Sarah Yeiser Mason and Victor Eugene Heerman. Koenig had two children with Heerman, John (born 1950) and Victoria (born 1951). The couple divorced in 1954. In 1961, he married jazz singer Joy Bryan. Koenig died of a heart attack on November 21, 1977.
