= CMT San Jose =

Performing arts organization based in San Jose, California

- Children's Musical Theater San Jose
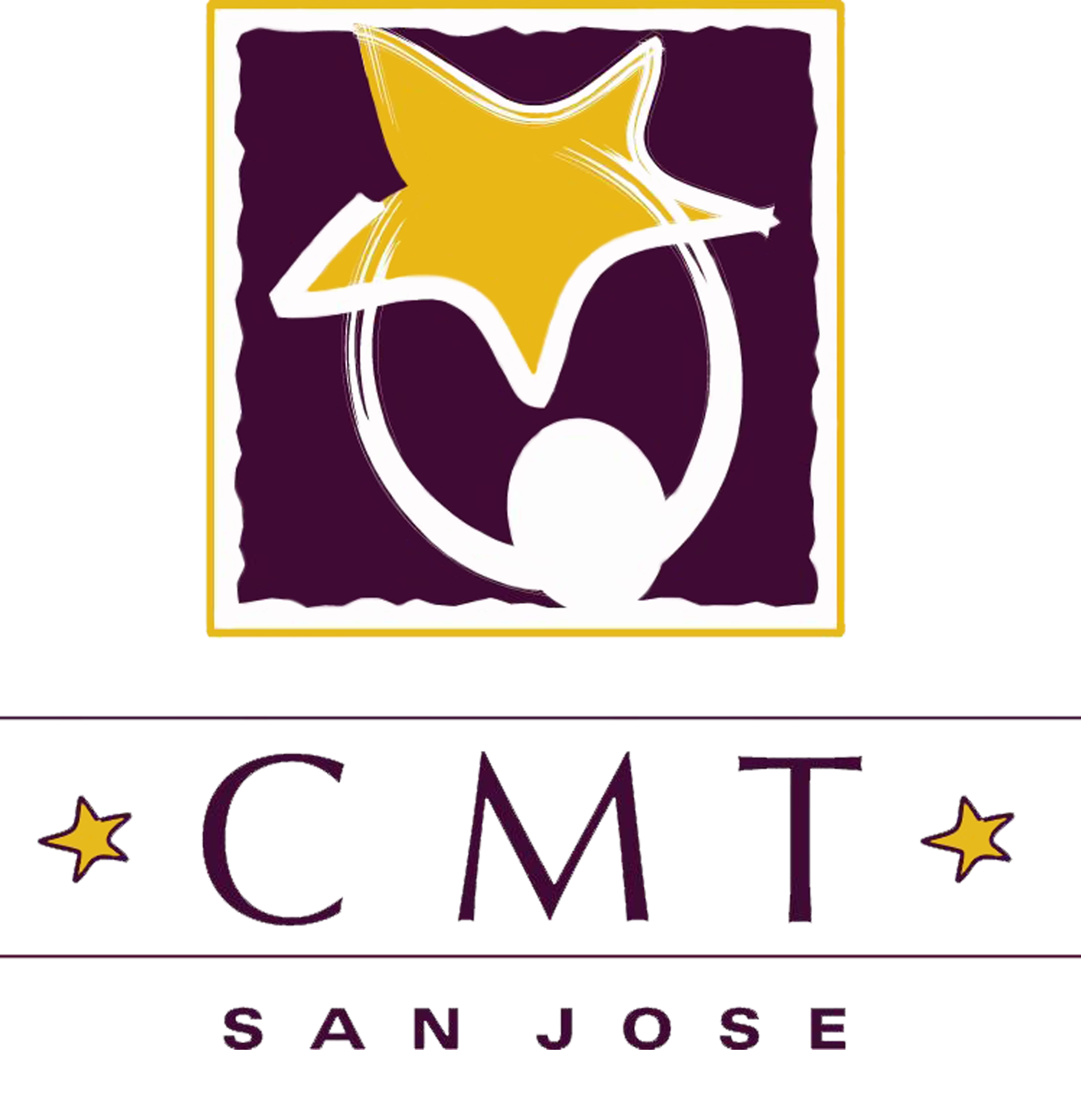
- Formation: 1968
- Founder: John P. Healy Jr.
- Type: Nonprofit
- Headquarters: CMT Creative Arts Center
- Location: San Jose, California, USA
- Artistic director: Kikau Alvaro
- Managing director: Dana Zell
- Students: 950 stage performers; 475 class participants; 745 camp participants; (2023)
- Award: 12 grants from the National Endowment for the Arts
- Website: www.cmtsj.org

CMT San Jose (Children's Musical Theater San Jose) is a non-profit performing arts organization, which produces and stages musical theatre at the Montgomery Theater in downtown San Jose.

One of the largest youth musical theater and training programs in the US, the organization produces eleven full-scale musicals per year in three different divisions of children between the ages of 7 and 20. Nine of the eleven productions cast every child who auditions. Two productions are showcases for more professional performers who donate their time and talent to benefit the organization. CMT also runs workshops, and summer camps for children as young as four.

CMT is a 501(c)(3) nonprofit and is the oldest performing arts organization in San Jose. It was the first non-professional company in the country to stage the musicals Aida and Miss Saigon, and the first to produce a number of others on the West Coast, including A Christmas Carol, Billy Elliot, Sister Act and American Idiot. The company has earned 12 grants from the National Endowment for the Arts and, as of 2024 has put on over 400 musical theater productions.

At least 14 CMT alumni have gone on to perform on Broadway or on Broadway tours.

== Early years ==
CMT’s origins trace to a musical touring troupe called the Entr'actes, founded in 1968 by 17-year-old John P. Healy, Jr. Healy, a musical performer and writer who aspired to build easy opportunities for young people to perform onstage, led a group of 15 young people who performed scenes from various musicals at local churches, rest homes and hospitals. They also performed operettas, including one based on Hansel & Gretel, produced and directed by Healy. Later, the group moved into the bingo hall at St. Francis Cabrini School and changed its name to the Cabrini Community Theater.

By 1972, the group had changed its name to San Jose Children’s Musical Theater (SJCMT) and moved into an old San Jose building that had previously housed the First Church of Christ, Scientist. The building, used primarily as a rehearsal space, later became known as the Palace of Performing Arts or P.O.P.A. Shows were performed at the Montgomery Theater in downtown San Jose and, for a few years in the mid-1980s, moved to the old Campbell High School's historic Heritage Theater.

SJCMT continued to grow, and by 1975 it reported that over 1,000 children were involved in a year.

Healy directed, choreographed, musically directed and designed most of the 150 shows produced by SJCMT by the time he left in 1982.

== CMT today ==
Following Healy’s departure in 1982, the organization was largely run by volunteer parents until 1996, when the organization hired its first full-time artistic director, Kevin Hauge.

Hauge had started working with CMT in 1982, directing several summer shows, starting with Bye Bye Birdie. After a few years he left for other opportunities, then returned to San Jose in 1996.

While working with CMT, he received the Lin Wright Special Recognition Award by the American Alliance for Theatre and Education. He was the guest speaker at the International Association of Theater Educators Conference in Washington D.C. and at the Education and Technology conference in New York City. In 2016, Hauge received an honorable mention from the Tony Awards for Excellence in Theater Education.

Because of its widening reach beyond its origins, in 2001 CMT changed its formal name to Children's Musical Theater San Jose, which emphasizes the group's name over its home location.

In 2004 CMT started its "Marquee" program, with one production per year. In 2011 they exchanged one of their Mainstage shows for Marquee, bringing Mainstage down to three a year and bumping Marquee up to two.

To keep children performing and maintain their sense of community during the COVID-19 pandemic in 2020, CMT Mainstage rehearsed and performed In the Heights remotely. This included 200 performers recorded from their homes, with the recording presented at a drive-in theater.

In 1991 CMT began an annual "Cabaret Night" as a fundraiser event.

To engage the theater community in emerging technologies, in 1998 CMT started the unique "Theater As Digital Activity" program, which lasted until 2003.

In 2021 the organization moved its headquarters to a new 25,000 sq ft building to be used for rehearsals, classes, prop/costume storage and office space. It also set up the side parking lot for its three outdoor summer productions while indoor productions were prohibited.

In 2022, CMT increased their total annual shows to 11 by adding a second Junior Talents show.

In 2024 it was announced that Kevin Hauge would retire from his position as artistic director at the close of CMT's 57th season in 2025. In March 2025, Kikau Alvaro was announced as Hauge's successor.

== Management ==
In 1993 Michael Mulcahy was brought on as CMT's first executive director. In 1996, he hired Kevin R. Hauge to be the company's first full-time artistic director. CMT leadership after 2001 included Jennifer Sandretto Hull from 2001 to 2006, Michael Miller from 2012 to 2016, and Dana Zell from 2016 to the present. In August 2025, Kikau Alvaro became the organization's new artistic director.

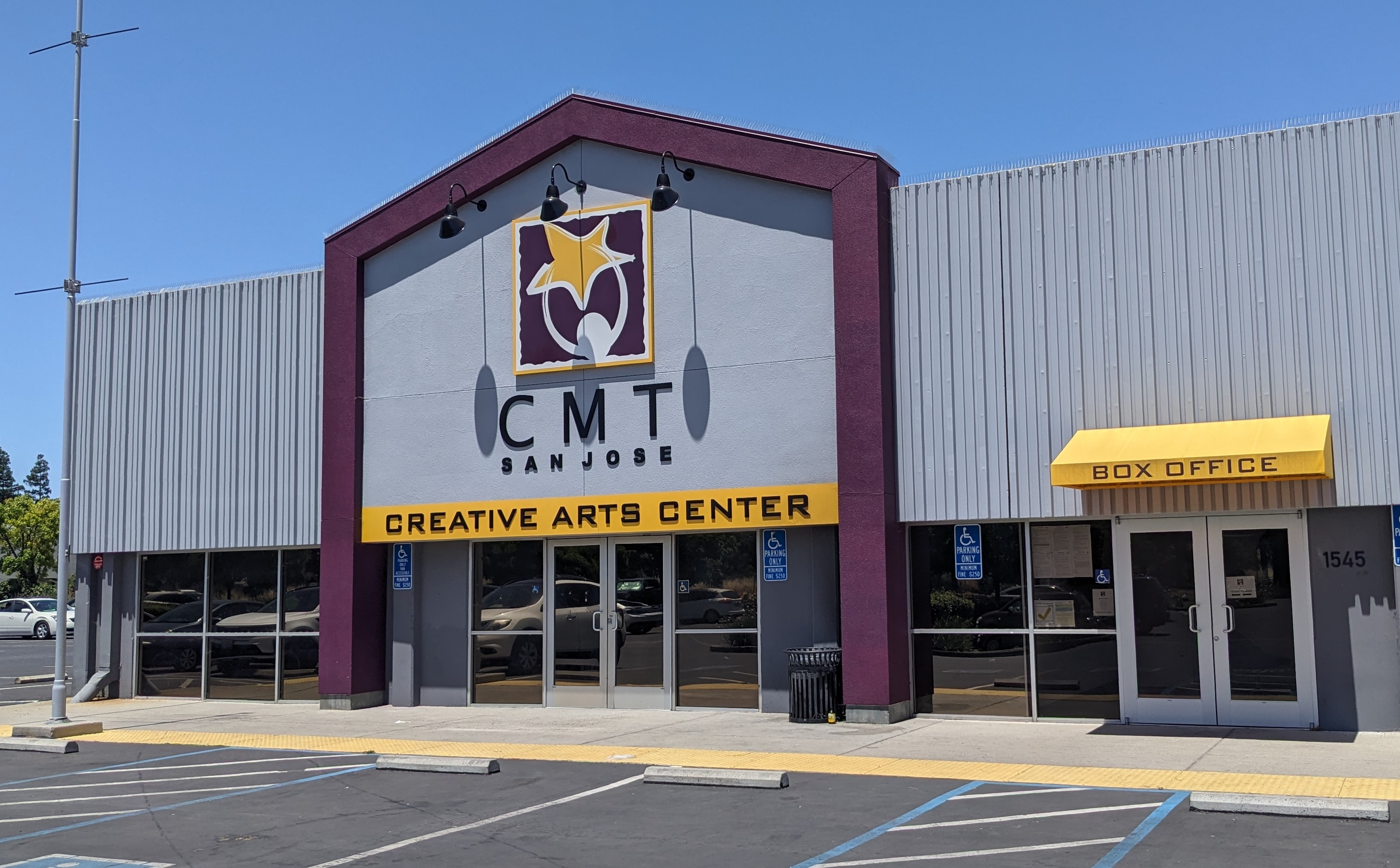
CMT Creative Arts Center, in use since 2021

== Performance venues ==
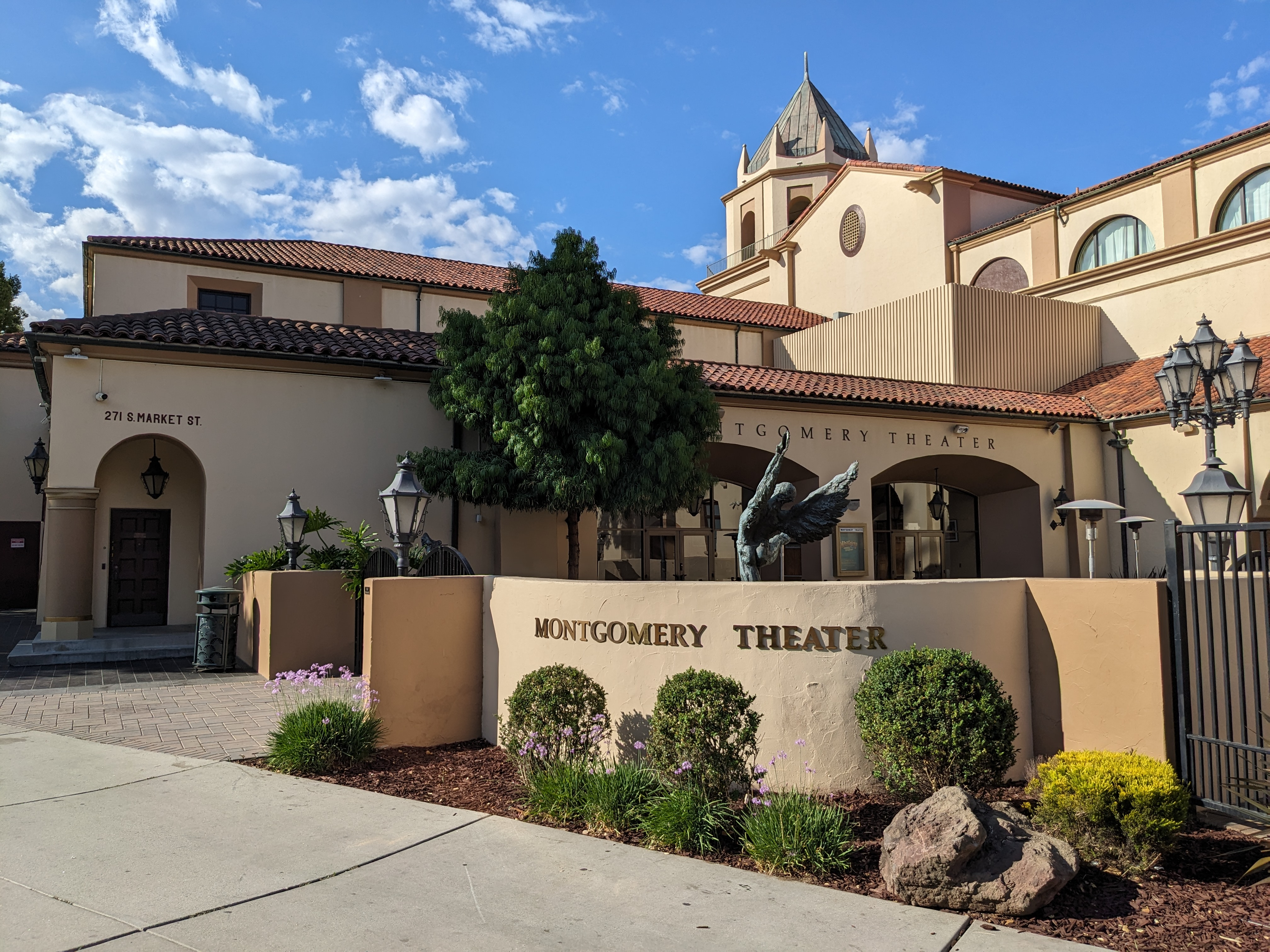
The Montgomery Theater in 2024

CMT's original performance venue was the St. Frances Cabrini Hall. Over the years the organization occasionally performed in a few other locations as well, including various high schools and the San Jose Center for the Performing Arts.

Since 1973, CMT's performances have almost exclusively occurred at the Montgomery Theater, which shares a building with the San Jose Civic.

== Performance divisions ==
CMT's annual musical productions are separated into four named categories, based on age ranges. Occasionally the age range may be adjusted for a given performance.

Junior Talents is the youngest age range (7–11). It currently puts on two performances every season, though not every season has included Junior Talents shows.

Rising Stars is for age range 8–14. It currently puts on four performances every season.

Mainstage is for age range 14–20. It currently puts on three performances per season (four performances before 2011). These high quality shows usually include a live orchestra.

Introduced in 2005, Marquee performances include children as well as adults from the Bay Area across all age ranges, including many CMT alumni. It has an equally high production value as Mainstage shows.

Unlike other performance groups, casting is not guaranteed for those who audition for Marquee shows. It puts on two performances every year (one before 2011).

== Programs ==
=== Theater As Digital Activity ===
In 1996, CMT started Theater As Digital Activity (TADA!), an online program to allow children from around the world to collaborate and fully create musicals to be produced by CMT and performed by their members. The program ended after its last production in 2003.

A website called ConvoNation, which was a communications platform for sick and disabled children created by Apple’s Worldwide Disabilities Solutions Group, collaborated with CMT to create TADA's first project, the original musical Pulse: The Rhythm of Life. It was released and performed in 1998, featuring Alex Brightman in a lead role. In 1999, PBS made a documentary about the development of Pulse, hosted by Annette Bening.

Other projects developed under the TADA program include Our Tree: The Family Chronicles, released in May 2000; 2101 in 2001; A Little Princess in 2002; and Persephone in 2003. Of these, three were written and composed in part by Richard Link.

=== Classes and workshops ===
CMT offers classes for recital, dance, acting, improv, vocal and auditions for ages ranging from 4 to 20. Occasionally, professional guest artists are brought in to teach classes. The following notable artists have taught or presented at CMT: Thomas Schumacher, theatrical producer; Anthony Rapp, Broadway and film actor; Jason Robert Brown and Drew Gasparini, Broadway composers; and Jacob Brent, actor and choreographer.

Some CMT alumni have also returned in a teaching capacity, including Alex Brightman, Aaron Albano and Matt Hill.

=== Student audience matinees ===
For each of its shows performed in a season, CMT offers special discounted matinée (morning) performances exclusively for schools and other local community groups. These include a Q & A session during intermission and a study guide for teachers to help their students and prepare them for their experience.

=== Touring groups ===
From its beginnings until 1999, CMT had one or more tour groups, in which members would perform at various community events as well as for private parties, organizations, hospitals and schools.

Originally starting out as the "Entr'Acts", additional groups added in the 1970s were known as the "Finales", the "Melodear" and the "Reprises". From the early 80s through the 90s there was a single touring group known as "The Neighborhood Kids".

== Events ==
CMT San Jose holds the following annual events:

Gala – Fundraising event early in the year during which alumni and current performers put on multiple show numbers during a brunch and dinner. Includes auctions and raffles. This event started in 1991 and was originally known as Cabaret Night.

Preview Night – Free outdoor potluck event in the summer that includes several live preview performances of musical numbers from the remainder of the season and the announcement of all of the musicals for the next season.

Honors Night – Free event in December with presentations and performances in which outstanding performers receive awards for various categories.

While not relating to CMT's own shows, the organization also hosts the Rita Moreno Awards (Rita Moreno California High School Musical Honors) – A competition in May co-hosted with Broadway San Jose to recognize outstanding achievements in high school musicals. The Lead Actor and Actress winners go on to the Jimmy Awards in New York City.

== List of productions ==
	Junior Talents	Rising Stars	Mainstage	Marquee
Season 59 2026 – 2027	How to Train Your Dragon Jr.; Alice in Wonderland Jr.; Dare to Dream Jr.	Matilda the Musical; Shrek the Musical; Oklahoma!; 42nd Street	Spring Awakening; Les Misérables; The Prom	Come From Away
Season 58 2025 – 2026	Diary of a Wimpy Kid; Pinocchio	Fiddler on the Roof; The Drowsy Chaperone; Godspell; Newsies	The 25th Annual Putnam County Spelling Bee; Chess; Legally Blonde	Finding Neverland; Dear Evan Hansen
Season 57 2024 – 2025	The Lion King Experience; James and the Giant Peach	A Christmas Carol; The Adventures of Tom Sawyer; Once Upon a Mattress; Guys and Dolls	Rock of Ages; Hadestown; Frozen	Beautiful: The Carole King Musical; Waitress
Season 56 2023 – 2024	Junie B. Jones; Madagascar Jr	Freaky Friday; Seussical; Honk!; Crazy for You	Mean Girls; Pippin; Rent	Charlie and the Chocolate Factory; School of Rock
Season 55 2022 – 2023	The Big One-Oh!; Finding Nemo Jr	The Wizard of Oz; The Sound of Music; Schoolhouse Rock Live!; 13	Head over Heels; Cinderella; The Hunchback of Notre Dame	Something Rotten!; Mary Poppins
Season 54 2021 – 2022	Frozen Jr; Moana Jr	The Lightning Thief; Joseph and the Amazing Technicolor Dreamcoat; Disney's Descendants; The Little Mermaid	Les Misérables; Urinetown; The SpongeBob Musical	White Christmas; Kinky Boots
Season 53 2020 – 2021	Snoopy! The Musical	Starlight Express	American Idiot	
Season 53 2020 – 2021	_{Due to the COVID-19 pandemic only 3 productions were produced this season. They were performed outdoors in the summer at CMT's Creative Arts Center.}			
Season 52 2019 – 2020		You're a Good Man, Charlie Brown; Into the Woods, Jr	Shrek the Musical; In the Heights	Matilda the Musical
Season 52 2019 – 2020	_{Due to the COVID-19 pandemic only 5 productions were produced this season. In the Heights was performed remotely.}			
Season 51 2018 – 2019	James and the Giant Peach	Elf; Aladdin; Anything Goes; The Adventures of Tom Sawyer	Chicago; Legally Blonde; A Gentleman's Guide to Love and Murder	Beauty and the Beast; Mamma Mia
Season 50 2017 – 2018	Robin Hood	Fiddler on the Roof; Once upon a Mattress; Seussical; The Wiz	The Who's Tommy; Avenue Q; West Side Story	Newsies; Guys and Dolls
Season 49 2016 – 2017	The Lion King Experience	A Christmas Carol; Willy Wonka; Once on This Island; 13	The 25th Annual Putnam County Spelling Bee; Evita; The Hunchback of Notre Dame	Hairspray; Sweeney Todd: The Demon Barber of Fleet Street
Season 48 2015 – 2016	101 Dalmatians	Joseph and the Amazing Technicolor Dreamcoat; Honk!; Alice in Wonderland; Crazy for You	Sister Act; Grease; Rent	The Little Mermaid; Billy Elliot
Season 47 2014 – 2015	Pinocchio	The Sound of Music; Schoolhouse Rock Live!; Thoroughly Modern Millie; Mulan	American Idiot; Into the Woods; Jekyll & Hyde	Ragtime; Mary Poppins
Season 46 2013 – 2014	The Jungle Book	The Wizard of Oz; The Pirates of Penzance; You're a Good Man, Charlie Brown; Oklahoma!	Shrek the Musical; Cats; Side Show	White Christmas; Spamalot
Season 45 2012 – 2013	Heidi	Barnum; Godspell; Aladdin; The Music Man	In The Heights; Phantom; Jesus Christ Superstar	Les Misérables; A Chorus Line
Season 44 2011 – 2012	Rapunzel	Seussical; Doctor Dolittle; The Adventures of Tom Sawyer; Bye Bye Birdie	Legally Blonde; Avenue Q; Xanadu	Tarzan; 9 to 5
Season 43 2010 – 2011	The Velveteen Rabbit	Cinderella; Guys and Dolls; Starmites; The Wiz	The Drowsy Chaperone; The Secret Garden; Aida	Hairspray; Chicago
Season 42 2009 – 2010	Rugrats: A Live Adventure	13; Once Upon a Mattress; Once on This Island; High School Musical 2	Oliver!; The 25th Annual Putnam County Spelling Bee; Little Shop of Horrors; Miss Saigon	Singin' in the Rain
Season 41 2008 – 2009	One Hundred and One Dalmatians	Disney's Alice in Wonderland; Joseph and the Amazing Technicolor Dreamcoat; Willy Wonka, Jr.; Honk!	Peter Pan; Rent; Candide; The Who's Tommy	Disney's When You Wish
Season 40 2007 – 2008		You're a Good Man, Charlie Brown; Schoolhouse Rock; Mulan Jr.; Babes in Arms; Pinocchio	Annie Warbucks; Jekyll & Hyde; Into the Woods; West Side Story	Ragtime
Season 39 2006 – 2007		The Jungle Book; The Wizard of Oz; Oklahoma!; High School Musical; Charlotte's Web	Beauty and the Beast; Cats; Evita; Leader of the Pack	Thoroughly Modern Millie
Season 38 2005 – 2006		Wind in the Willows; Aladdin; Godspell; Heidi	The King and I; Les Misérables; Phantom; Side Show	The Full Monty
Season 37 2004 – 2005		The Boy Friend; The Adventures of Tom Sawyer; Bye Bye Birdie; Sleeping Beauty	A Christmas Carol; Aida; Seussical; Jesus Christ Superstar	Chess
Season 36 2003 – 2004		Guys and Dolls; Cinderella; The Wiz; The Velveteen Rabbit	Fiddler on the Roof; Little Shop of Horrors; Once on This Island; Miss Saigon	

== Alumni ==
=== Broadway performers ===
- Aaron J. Albano – Newsies, Cats, Aladdin
- Alex Brightman – School of Rock, Beetlejuice
- Will Brill – Act One, Stereophonic
- Maya Drake - Hell's Kitchen
- Adrienne Eller – A Gentleman's Guide to Love and Murder
- Isabella Esler – Beetlejuice, Life After
- Megan Masako Haley – Wicked, Mean Girls
- Alia Hodge – Beautiful: The Carole King Musical
- Eric Michael Krop – Godspell
- Myha'la – The Book of Mormon
- Dennis O’Bannion – White Christmas
- Nick Spangler – Tootsie, The Book of Mormon
- Chelsea Morgan Stock – The Little Mermaid, Something Rotten!, Sister Act
- Ryan Vasquez – The Notebook, Hamilton

=== Other alumni ===
- Jennifer Cihi – singer, actress
- D. C. Douglas – actor, voice actor
- Teri Hatcher – actress, singer
- Jason Jurman – actor
- Neil Kaplan – voice actor
- Darren Korb – songwriter, composer, voice actor
- Anna Maria Perez de Tagle – actress
- Kate Walsh – actress, businesswoman
