= List of Schoolhouse Rock! episodes =

The following is a list of the 65 music videos of the Schoolhouse Rock! series.

== Series overview ==
Season	Title	Episodes	Originally released		
Season	Title	Episodes	First released	Last released	Network
1	Multiplication Rock	11	January 6, 1973	March 31, 1973	ABC
2	Grammar Rock	9	September 15, 1973	September 11, 1993	ABC
3	America Rock	12	September 20, 1975	August 27, 2002	ABC
4	Science Rock	9	September 16, 1978	July 14, 1979	ABC
5	Computer Rock	4	1982	1984	ABC
6	Money Rock	8	May 7, 1994	November 22, 1996	ABC
7	Earth Rock	12	March 31, 2009		Direct-to-video

== Music videos ==
=== Multiplication Rock, Season 1 (1973) ===
No. overall	No. in season	Title	Performed by	Written by	Original release date
1	1	"Three Is a Magic Number"	Bob Dorough	Bob Dorough	January 6, 1973
A magician shows how magic the multiplication of 3 really is, including a family of three and a football team whose uniforms are numbered in threes. "Three Is a Magic Number" was the pilot episode and had originally aired in full as part of Curiosity Shop on September 2, 1971 (two years before ABC aired the show). When aired on Multiplication Rock, a small portion was cut due to an error: Dorough had included a claim that there were exactly three multiples of three in every set of ten natural numbers, but this generalization fails when the first number in the set is a multiple of 30, in which case there are four multiples of three.
2	2	"My Hero, Zero"	Bob Dorough	Bob Dorough	January 13, 1973
A young boy portrayed as a superhero shows his skeptical older sister the importance of the digit 0 as well as multiplication by powers of 10.
3	3	"Elementary, My Dear"	Bob Dorough	Bob Dorough	January 27, 1973
In the days leading up to the Great Flood, Noah teaches his youngest son and the son's female companion the process of multiplication by 2, by counting the animals as they are loaded two-by-two into the ark. The table up to 2×35 is given (much higher than the rest of the series, which limits the tables to ×12), as well as the process of long multiplication for larger numbers. As the flood begins, the song segues into the spiritual "Didn't It Rain."
4	4	"The Four-Legged Zoo"	Bob Dorough w/kids chorus	Bob Dorough	February 10, 1973
A teacher (Miss Simpson) takes her class on a field trip to the zoo where they use the animals (Alpacas, Ibexes, Kudus, etc.) to learn the multiplication of 4.
5	5	"Ready or Not, Here I Come"	Bob Dorough	Bob Dorough, Maurice Irby Jr.	February 17, 1973
A boy (who is the oldest of a group of students) counts by fives during a game of hide and seek with his friends. (Irby's writing credit comes from the inclusion of some lyrics from his composition "Apples, Peaches, Pumpkin Pie," a hit song by Jay and the Techniques.)
6	6	"I Got Six"	Grady Tate	Bob Dorough	February 24, 1973
This is the first to feature an African-American child as the main character of the series. It teaches about the multiplication of 6 using a visit to the candy store, a game of jacks, a chicken laying eggs, working-class people vs. upper-class people going out to a restaurant, and an African prince with diamond rings, barrels of oil, and 12 wives. It also explores the commutative property in multiplication.
7	7	"Lucky Seven Sampson"	Bob Dorough	Bob Dorough	February 17, 1973
Lucky Seven Sampson is a happy-go-lucky but mischievous rabbit with the number 7 stamped on the bottom of his right foot and a black circle around his left eye. He teaches kids from Public School #7 about the multiplication of 7. It also explores the distributive property for multiplying 7 by numbers greater than 10.
8	8	"Figure Eight"	Blossom Dearie	Bob Dorough	February 24, 1973
In a rural one-room school on a cold winter's day, a young girl's thoughts about the multiplication of 8 revolve around winter games, particularly ice skating. The video briefly explores the distributive property of multiplication/addition for multiplying 8 by numbers higher than 10, along with an allusion to 8 being a power of 2 (mentioning 8×2 being the same as 4×4 and 2×8, without getting into the exponential, factorization or mean proportional mathematics involved) and closes by noting the numeral 8's resemblance to a sideways infinity symbol.
9	9	"Naughty Number Nine"	Grady Tate	Bob Dorough	March 17, 1973
A Minnesota Fats-like feline pool hustler plays a game of nine-ball, with a mouse as his usual target, in the process showing multiplication by 9. It also looks at the phenomenon that any multiple of nine will have its digits add up to nine (e.g. 3 x 9 = 27, and 2 + 7 = 9). This short came out two years after the Public Health Cigarette Smoking Act had prohibited cigarette advertising; it did not, however, prohibit the depiction of smoking in fiction, even in children's programming, so long as it was not a sponsored tie-in. In the short, Number Nine puffs a cigar throughout. ABC Broadcast Standards and Practices, after initially rejecting the short for this reason, relented and allowed the short to air when it accepted that the cat was a villain and would not encourage children to smoke. It remained in rotation through the rest of the series run.
10	10	"The Good Eleven"	Bob Dorough	Bob Dorough	March 24, 1973
Winged angels take us through the multiplication of 11 while continually bumping into the number 10. The distributive property of multiplication and addition, plus the commutative property of multiplication are also briefly explored.
11	11	"Little Twelvetoes"	Bob Dorough	Bob Dorough	March 31, 1973
In this space rock piece, a yokel (the slowpoke from "Ready or Not, Here I Come") encounters Little Twelvetoes, a peculiar, Cheshire/Hatter-like extraterrestrial lifeform in a flying saucer who has six fingers on each hand and six toes on each foot and counts using base-twelve (which is demonstrated with the Frank Emerson Andrews notation of χ and ↋ for the tenth and eleventh digits). Having only ten fingers and toes on each hand and foot, the yokel must learn multiplication by 12 "the hard way," and Little Twelvetoes obliges with a game of interplanetary pinball before disappearing into the night.

=== Grammar Rock, Season 2 (1973–74, 1977, 1993) ===
No. overall	No. in season	Title	Performed by	Written by	Original release date
12	1	"A Noun is a Person, Place or Thing"	Lynn Ahrens	Lynn Ahrens	September 15, 1973
A young white-haired girl (Ahrens in her series introduction) sings about the different people, places and things she encounters on her daily adventures, introducing the viewer to the grammatical construct of nouns.
13	2	"Verb: That's What's Happening"	Zachary Sanders	Bob Dorough	September 22, 1973
In an homage to blaxploitation films, a young black boy learns about verbs from a movie starring his favorite superhero, Verb.
14	3	"Conjunction Junction"	Jack Sheldon, Terry Morel & Mary Sue Berry	Bob Dorough	November 17, 1973
In a railyard, a train conductor (Sheldon in his series debut) shows the viewer how conjunctions work by hooking up boxcars representing words, phrases and clauses with one of three conjunction boxcars: AND (a red boxcar), BUT (a yellow tank car), and OR (a green hopper car).
15	4	"Interjections!"	Essra Mohawk	Lynn Ahrens	February 23, 1974
This song teaches about interjections through three stories: an ill child reacting to a shot of medication, a woman rejecting a suitor's advances, and a group of irate fans shouting non-obscene words in response to an interception at a football game. The song's chorus quotes the Hallelujah Chorus from Handel's Messiah. Producer Tom Yohe's daughter Lauren provides the closing line: "Darn! That's the end!"
16	5	"Unpack Your Adjectives"	Blossom Dearie	George Newall	March 2, 1974
A young girl and her turtle friend go camping in the forest, using adjectives to describe people, places and things they encounter.
17	6	"Lolly, Lolly, Lolly, Get Your Adverbs Here"	Bob Dorough	Bob Dorough	April 13, 1974
The Lolly family, owners of a store that sells adverbs, demonstrate their product. Bob Dorough provides the voices of all three generations of Lollys at various speeds.
18	7	"Rufus Xavier Sarsaparilla"	Jack Sheldon	Bob Dorough & Kathy Mandry	February 5, 1977
A trio with long names: Rufus Xavier Sarsaparilla, his sister Rafaella Gabriela Sarsaparilla and their friend (and narrator) Albert Andreas Armadillo, along with their pets consisting of a kangaroo, an aardvark and a rhinoceros, introduce the concept of pronouns as an alternative to using their long and unwieldy names.
19	8	"Busy Prepositions"	Bob Dorough & Jack Sheldon	Bob Dorough	September 11, 1993
A horde of working ants called "The Busy P's" teach about prepositions while on the job.
20	9	"The Tale of Mr. Morton"	Jack Sheldon	Lynn Ahrens	September 11, 1993
A single man named Mr. Morton is the subject of a series of sentences describing his life and courtship with a neighbor. The episode illustrates the grammatical constructs of subject and predicate.

=== America Rock, Season 3 (1975–76, 1979, 2002) ===
No. overall	No. in season	Title	Performed by	Written by	Original release date
21	1	"No More Kings"	Lynn Ahrens and Bob Dorough	Lynn Ahrens	September 20, 1975
An abridged history of the Thirteen Colonies is presented, beginning with the arrival of the Pilgrims and spanning through to just before the American Revolutionary War.
22	2	"The Shot Heard 'Round the World"	Bob Dorough	Bob Dorough	October 18, 1975
This song teaches about the American Revolution.
23	3	"The Preamble"	Lynn Ahrens	Lynn Ahrens	November 1, 1975
The events of the constitutional convention of 1787 and the Constitution of the United States that emerged from it are the topic of this song, with the lyrics of the chorus directly quoting the constitution's preamble and setting it to music. A small section of the preamble was cut to make the song scan better.
24	4	"Sufferin' till Suffrage"	Essra Mohawk	Bob Dorough & Tom Yohe	February 21, 1976
In this song, a star-spangled dressed woman teaches and sings about the steps women took to get their right to vote.
25	5	"I'm Just a Bill"	Jack Sheldon & John Sheldon	Dave Frishberg	March 27, 1976
A proposed transportation bill, depressed about the long and arduous legislative process and eager to be signed into law, sits on the steps to Capitol Hill and laments his plight to a young boy standing nearby, explaining the legislative process along the way. To his delight, the bill is signed into law at the end of the song.
26	6	"The Great American Melting Pot"	Lori Lieberman	Lynn Ahrens	May 1, 1976
This song teaches about immigration in America, using the extant analogy of a melting pot (stirred by the Statue of Liberty) to describe how multiples of cultures assimilated into each other over the course of American history.
27	7	"Elbow Room"	Sue Manchester	Lynn Ahrens	May 22, 1976
This song teaches about the Westward Expansion, or moving south and west from the 13 original colonies.
28	8	"Fireworks"	Grady Tate	Lynn Ahrens	July 3, 1976
As a paperboy announces a fireworks display in honor of the United States Bicentennial (the night after this episode's original airing), the lead singer sings a Dixieland jazz-inspired tune centered around the Declaration of Independence, touching on the Committee of Five (misidentifying Robert Livingston as his cousin Philip Livingston), Thomas Paine's Common Sense, and several quotations from the Declaration, along with the resulting escalation of the Revolutionary War that followed. A depiction of John Trumbull's famous Declaration painting is briefly seen.
29	9	"Mother Necessity"	Bob Dorough, Blossom Dearie, Essra Mohawk & Jack Sheldon	Bob Dorough	July 10, 1976
In a play on the adage "Necessity is the mother of invention," great inventions are set to a series of short, mostly unrelated songs tied together by the titular Mother Necessity (resembling Whistler's Mother), who keeps pictures of the inventions on her wall. In several of the songs, fictional accounts describe how struggles of the inventors' mothers supposedly inspired major inventions by Samuel Morse, Thomas Edison, Elias Howe and the Wright Brothers.
30	10	"Three-Ring Government"	Lynn Ahrens	Bob Dorough	March 13, 1979
Introduced during season 4. In this song, a boy introduces the branches of the United States Government and its concept of separation of powers, using a three-ring circus as a model.
31	11	"I'm Gonna Send Your Vote to College"	Jack Sheldon & Bob Dorough	Bob Dorough & George Newall	August 27, 2002
This song teaches about the electoral college. Created in response to the controversial 2000 Election; it was featured in the 30th anniversary special video as a bonus. This episode was first produced in the 21st century.
32	12	"Presidential Minute" "The Campaign Trail"	Jack Sheldon	George R. Newall & Tom Yohe Jr.	August 27, 2002
This song teaches about voting for president. The song was originally recorded in 1996 as "The Campaign Trail". Six years later, the animated episode was released to DVD in 2002 as "Presidential Minute".

=== Science Rock, Season 4 (1978–79) ===
No. overall	No. in season	Title	Performed by	Written by	Original release date
33	1	"A Victim of Gravity"	The Tokens	Lynn Ahrens	September 16, 1978
In the late 1950s, a greaser experiences misfortune due to things constantly falling as he courts his redheaded sweetheart, Mary Jean. The song superficially describes gravity and its necessity in keeping things attached to Earth and its orbit in outer space, also noting Isaac Newton and Galileo Galilei's contributions to modern understanding of the concept.
34	2	"Interplanet Janet"	Lynn Ahrens	Lynn Ahrens	November 18, 1978
An anthropomorphic comet with a rocket-tailed skirt, wings and her hair in curls, which done in a "cloud" style, and a humanoid head explores the Solar System, getting an autograph from the Sun (because it is, literally, a star) and visiting each planet. In bypassing Earth, she is mistaken for a UFO by the "weird" Earthlings. Near the end, it mentions the possible existence of exoplanets in other planetary systems (something that was eventually confirmed in 1992). "Interplanet Janet" became outdated within three months of its first airing, due to Pluto being mentioned as the ninth and farthest planet from the Sun; on February 7, 1979, Pluto's orbit came closer to the Sun than Neptune's, a situation that remained until Pluto moved further out on its elliptical orbit in 1999. Pluto was reclassified as a dwarf planet along with three other celestial bodies in 2006. It was always re-aired intact, but structured so that the Pluto section could be edited out without clear inconsistency.
35	3	"The Body Machine"	Bob Dorough & Jack Sheldon	Lynn Ahrens	January 6, 1979
This song teaches about our bodies' digestive process and nutritional needs. A young girl focuses on people going strong.
36	4	"Do the Circulation"	Joshie Armstead, Mary Sue Berry & Maeretha Stewart	Lynn Ahrens	March 20, 1979
This song teaches about our bodies' circulatory system, in the style of an exercise video.
37	5	"The Energy Blues"	Jack Sheldon	George Newall	March 27, 1979
The Earth, depicted with a human face, tells the history of energy production and consumption in the world and raises concerns about the environment and future energy crises.
38	6	"Them Not-So-Dry Bones"	Jack Sheldon	George Newall	May 5, 1979
This song teaches about the human skeleton; the song is based on the traditional song "Dem Bones", which a male quartet sings fragments of throughout.
39	7	"Electricity, Electricity"	Zachary Sanders	Bob Dorough	May 19, 1979
This song teaches about the use of electricity, its means of measurement, and the demonstration of an electric generator; the narrator remarks that electric generation is a fuel-intensive process since, unlike in the animation, there are no superheroes to hand-crank the generator. This short was later edited in 2019, which tones down the speed of the flickering effects in several sequences to avoid risk of inducing epileptic seizures in reviewers.
40	8	"Telegraph Line"	Jaime Aff & Christine Langner	Lynn Ahrens	June 30, 1979
The human nervous system is personified as a messenger delivering telegrams to and from the brain, passing along messages representing pain, heat and stage fright.
41	9	"The Greatest Show on Earth" "The Weather Show"	Bob Kaliban	Lynn Ahrens	July 14, 1979
This song teaches the three basic components of weather in the style of a vaudeville show. Some time after 1987, "The Greatest Show on Earth" was pulled from broadcast after Ringling Bros. and Barnum & Bailey Circus objected to the name, as the circus owned a trademark on the phrase. The short only aired on television a couple times during the 1990s revival, and it was not included on most VHS releases after that date. On the DVD release of the series, it is included as a separate lost episode, using the name "The Weather Show."

=== Computer Rock, Season 5 (1982–84) ===
No. overall	No. in season	Title	Performed by	Written by	Original release date
42	1	"Introduction"	Darrell Stern & Bob Kaliban	Bob Dorough, Lynn Ahrens & Tom Yohe	1982
This song teaches about the computer, introducing the recurring characters Scooter Computer and Mr. Chips. (This episode was left off of the DVD release, reportedly due to ABC having lost the master tape. Darrell Stern, the voice of Scooter Computer, preserved a copy on VHS and posted it to YouTube.)
43	2	"Hardware"	Darrell Stern & Bob Kaliban	Lynn Ahrens	1982
This song teaches about your computer's software and hardware.
44	3	"Software"	Darrell Stern & Bob Kaliban	Dave Frishberg	1983
Mr. Chips explains the basics of binary code and programming languages, and how those languages (mentioning the then-ubiquitous BASIC as an example) serve as an intermediary between the binary machine language the computer uses and the human English language.
45	4	"Number Cruncher"	Darrell Stern & Bob Kaliban	Dave Frishberg	1984
Scooter Computer has been assigned statistician duties for his baseball team, and, to solve his problem, Mr. Chips explains how computers make the job of calculating statistics easier and quicker.

=== Money Rock, Season 6 (1994–96) ===
In the 1990s, ABC produced more new episodes along with the last two of Grammar Rock.

No. overall	No. in season	Title	Performed by	Written by	Original release date
46	1	"Dollars and Sense"	Bob Dorough & Val Hawk	Dave Frishberg	May 7, 1994
Becky Sue, an aspiring country musician, consults a banker on how to raise enough money to buy the music equipment she needs to become a star; the banker introduces her to the banking system, suggesting a savings account that will earn interest, or a loan which she would have to then pay back with interest. The punchline is that when she does buy the equipment, her farm lacks the electricity to operate it, with the singer advising the listener to use "a little bit of common sense."
47	2	"Tax Man Max"	Patrick Quinn	Lynn Ahrens & Stephen Flaherty	June 26, 1995
A small, cute, sweet, and portly clown-like vaudeville star named Max and his five girlfriends, Tracy (dark skin), Annie (blonde hair), Kathi (tan skin), Joy (carrot top), and Natalie (red hair) explain how taxes are collected and how the revenue from those taxes is used, in a Broadway-style presentation.
48	3	"Where the Money Goes"	Jack Sheldon	Rich Mendoza	July 13, 1995
A tuba-playing boy who wants to go on his school band's trip to the Rose Bowl parade asks his father why they can't afford the trip, so the father teaches his son the expenses a family incurs, and how he can help save money so he can afford the trip.
49	4	"$7.50 Once a Week"	Dave Frishberg	Dave Frishberg	October 23, 1995
A kid with a $7.50 weekly allowance has spent all of it far quicker than he wanted to; the song explores the concept of budgeting, showing the several ways that the kid could have spent less money over the course of his week.
50	5	"Tyrannosaurus Debt"	Bob Dorough & Bob Kaliban	Tom Yohe	January 21, 1996
The song is a discussion of the continuous increases in the United States national debt, which is portrayed as an ever-growing Tyrannosaurus rex. Bill from "I'm Just a Bill" makes a cameo at the very end.
51	6	"This for That"	Bob Dorough	George Newall	May 6, 1996
This song teaches about the history of barter and trading as well as the evolution of the money supply throughout history, from prehistoric times to the modern age.
52	7	"Walkin' on Wall Street"	Dave Frishberg	Dave Frishberg	September 12, 1996
A pigeon, who lives on New York City's Wall Street, also happens to be a savvy investor in the listed company share market, introducing to the audience the basics of investing in stock.
53	8	"The Check's in the Mail"	Luther Rix & Bob Dorough	Bob Dorough	November 22, 1996
A kind, optimistic mailman teaches about the process a check goes through.

=== Earth Rock, Season 7 (2009) ===
Like the two newly-produced "America Rock" music video were released in 2002, none of the "Earth Rock" music videos were aired on television. This (last) season was released direct-to-video. Between songs 8 and 9, "The Energy Blues" is featured.

No. overall	No. in season	Title	Performed by	Written by	Original release date
54	1	"Report from the North Pole"	Bob Dorough, Jack Sheldon, Bob Kaliban & Barry Carl	Bob Dorough & George R. Newall	March 31, 2009
This song teaches about global warming.
55	2	"The Little Things We Do"	Lynn Ahrens, Jack Sheldon, Bob Dorough, Bob Kaliban, Val Hawk, Vicki Doney & Nancy Reed	Lynn Ahrens	March 31, 2009
This song teaches about energy conservation. This serves as a sequel to "The Tale of Mr. Morton" as the titular character, Pearl, and the cat (named Orton) return. The couple have a son named Norton.
56	3	"The Trash Can Band"	Lynn Ahrens, Luther Rix, Bob Dorough & Eric Weissberg	Lynn Ahrens	March 31, 2009
A box, a bottle, a can, and a carton named Dolly sing about recycling.
57	4	"You Oughta Be Savin' Water"	Barry Carl, Sean Altman & Elliott Kerman	Sean Altman, Barry Carl & George R. Newall	March 31, 2009
Dewey Drop and the Dips sing about water conservation.
58	5	"The Rainforest"	Tituss Burgess	Lynn Ahrens	March 31, 2009
This song is about rainforests.
59	6	"Save the Ocean"	Sean Altman, Inna Dukach, Jon Spurney, Patti Rothberg, Barry Carl & Eric Booker	Sean Altman	March 31, 2009
This song is about oceans.
60	7	"Fat Cat Blue: The Clean Rivers Song"	Jack Sheldon, Bob Kaliban, Val Hawk & Vicki Doney & Nancy Reed	Andy Brick	March 31, 2009
This song is about marine debris.
61	8	"A Tiny Urban Zoo"	Barrett Foa, Shoshana Bean & George Stiles	Anthony Drewe & George Stiles	March 31, 2009
This song is about gardens.
62	9	"Solar Power to the People"	Lynn Ahrens, Val Hawk, Vicki Doney & Nancy Reed	Lynn Ahrens	March 31, 2009
Interplanet Janet from the song of the same name returns in this song about solar energy.
63	10	"Windy and the Windmills"	Bob Dorough, Jack Sheldon, Val Hawk, Vicki Doney & Nancy Reed	Bob Dorough & George R. Newall	March 31, 2009
This song is about wind power.
64	11	"Don't Be a Carbon Sasquatch"	Bob Dorough	Bob Dorough	March 31, 2009
This song is about the carbon footprint.
65	12	"The 3 R's"	Mitchel Musso	Bob Dorough	March 31, 2009
This song teaches the three R's: Reduce, Reuse and Recycle.
