= Mr. Mistoffelees =

- Old Possum's Book of Practical Cats and Cats character
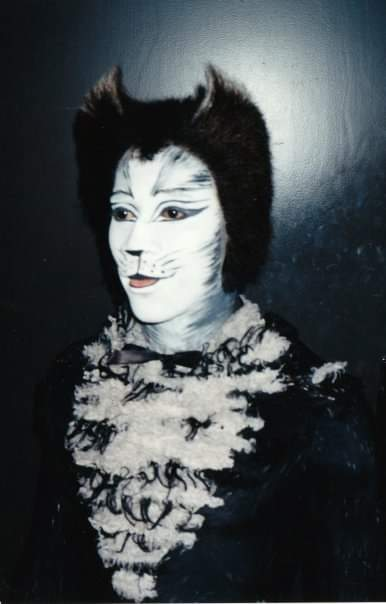
- Tim Hunter as Mr. Mistoffelees
- Created by: T. S. Eliot

In-universe information
- Alias: Quaxo
- Species: Cat

Mr. Mistoffelees is a character in T. S. Eliot's 1939 poetry book Old Possum's Book of Practical Cats and its 1981 musical adaptation, Andrew Lloyd Webber's Cats. Mistoffelees is a young black-and-white tuxedo cat with magical powers that he cannot yet fully control. He is a featured dancer and his signature move is the "Conjuring Turn", consisting of 24 consecutive fouettés en tournant. His chorus identity is sometimes named Quaxo.

The role of Mr. Mistoffelees was originated by Wayne Sleep in the West End in 1981, and by Timothy Scott on Broadway in 1982. Jacob Brent portrayed the character in the 1998 film, while Laurie Davidson portrayed him in the 2019 film.

== Poem ==
Mr. Mistoffelees (excerpt)

He is quiet and small, he is black
From his ears to the tip of his tail;
He can creep through the tiniest crack,
He can walk on the narrowest rail.
He can pick any card from a pack,
He is equally cunning with dice;
He is always deceiving you into believing
That he's only hunting for mice.
He can play any trick with a cork
Or a spoon and a bit of fish-paste;
If you look for a knife or a fork
And you think it is merely misplaced--
You have seen it one moment, and then it is gawn!
But you'll find it next week lying out on the lawn.

— T. S. Eliot, Old Possum's Book of Practical Cats

Mistoffelees' name derives from the demon Mephistopheles. However, the character is not sinister as the name implies, and instead is described by Eliot as being "the original conjuring cat", who is "always deceiving you into believing that he's only hunting for mice" – a mysterious, quiet and small black feline capable of performing feats of magic and sleight of hand. These traits are portrayed as amusing, not fearsome or particularly deadly.

Although originally published as part of a collection of poems, "Mr. Mistoffelees" was published as a standalone book by Faber and Faber in 2015.

== Cats ==
In Cats, Mistoffelees is a principal role and maintains most of the same attributes as Eliot's original character, although he is a much flashier showman. He is portrayed as a young Jellicle cat who is not yet able to fully control his magical powers. As the most prominent male dancer, he usually serves as a counterpart to the lead female dancer, Victoria. Mistoffelees has his own titular song in the second act of the show, during which he performs an extended dance solo; the song is usually sung by him and Rum Tum Tugger. Mistoffelees's dance solo consists of some of the most difficult choreography in the show, including his signature "Conjuring Turn" that comprises 24 consecutive fouettés en tournant.

In most productions, Mistoffelees also sings the "Invitation to the Jellicle Ball" in the first act. In the original West End production, Mistoffelees also sang "The Old Gumbie Cat"; and in the original Broadway production, he sang "Mungojerrie and Rumpleteazer", until the song was reworked to allow the two titular characters to sing it themselves. In some versions of the musical, his chorus identity is given a second name, "Quaxo".

The role is usually played by dancers with extensive ballet training. Because the role's technical demands necessarily trump the performer's vocal abilities, the show permits multiple vocal tracks for the character—thereby allowing some dancers to sing quite a bit, while others do no singing at all. In productions where Mistoffelees does sing, he is played by a high baritone.

In the 2019 film adaptation, however, the role has been significantly altered. Mistoffelees, depicted by Laurie Davidson, is more nervous and unsure of himself. He is shown to actually have magical powers, including being able to levitate objects and able to pull objects such as mice and flowers out of his hat. He saves Victoria from a dog when Mungojerrie and Rumpleteazer abandon her in a house and becomes her friend and confidant by the end of the film.

== Costume ==
Although Eliot's poem is specific about Mistoffelees's appearance being "black from the ears to the tip of his tail", the practicalities of stage costume mean he is usually portrayed as a black-and-white tuxedo cat, as a pure black costume would be completely lost under stage lighting. He wears two costumes, a basic black hatched leotard with white chest and fluffy warmers through the majority of the show, and, for his feature song, a more glamorous black velvet and rhinestone costume, with a black jacket fitted with electric flashing lights to make for a more spectacular entrance.

== Notable casting ==
The role of Mr. Mistoffelees was originated by Wayne Sleep in the West End in 1981, and by Timothy Scott on Broadway in 1982. Actors who have portrayed Mistoffelees onstage include Louie Spence, Gen Horiuchi and George de la Peña. In the 1998 DVD production of the show, Mistoffelees is portrayed by Jacob Brent, reprising his Broadway role. In the 2016 Broadway revival the part was played by Ricky Ubeda.

Laurie Davidson portrayed him in the 2019 film adaptation.

== In popular culture ==
In 1980 the British actor Paul Nicholas released the song Magical Mr Mistoffelees as a single.

When Neil Patrick Harris hosted Saturday Night Live in 2009, Bobby Moynihan played Mr. Mistoffelees in a "Save Broadway" sketch.

In The Adventure Zone Versus Dracula, Mr. Mistoffelees is a ghostly shopkeeper who resembles the musical character, selling monster hunting gear with his "shopkeeping turns".

In Team America World Police (2004), Mr. Mistoffelees is referenced in a traumatic memory by the character “Chris” near the end of the movie.
