= Schoolhouse Rock Live! =

1993 musical

- Promotional Poster
- Music: Various
- Lyrics: Various
- Book: George Keating; Scott Ferguson; Kyle Hall
- Basis: Schoolhouse Rock! by David McCall
- Premiere: August 26, 1993: Cabaret Voltaire, Chicago
- Productions: 1993 Chicago; 1995 Off-Broadway; 1996 Chicago; 1997 Toronto; 1997 National Tour; 1999 Second National Tour; 2000 Third National Tour

Schoolhouse Rock Live! is a musical with music and lyrics by various artists and a book by George Keating, Scott Ferguson, and Kyle Hall. It is based on the animated musical educational series of short videos titled Schoolhouse Rock! created by David McCall. The plot follows a teacher, Tom, who is nervous for his first day of teaching. When he turns on Schoolhouse Rock!, the characters come alive and help him prepare for his lesson. It features popular songs including "I'm Just a Bill," "Lolly, Lolly, Lolly," "Do the Circulation," "Rufus Xavier Sarsaparilla," "Conjunction Junction," and "The Great American Melting Pot." It premiered at Chicago's Cabaret Voltaire in 1993, directed by Scott Ferguson in a partnership with Theatrebam Chicago. It moved off-Broadway in 1995. Since then, it has been performed by various schools and community theaters.

The show is a jukebox musical of sorts because it re-uses songs originally written for Schoolhouse Rock! Songs are composed by Bob Dorough, Dave Frishberg, George Newall, Lynn Ahrens, Kathy Mandry, and Tom Yohe.

== Productions ==
=== Original Chicago production ===
Schoolhouse Rock Live! opened at the Cabaret Voltaire in Chicago on August 26, 1993. The production was directed by Scott Ferguson, who also co-wrote the book with Kyle Hall and George Keating and produced by Nina Lynn and assistant produced by Hilerre Kirsch. The choreography was by Kate Swan, Karyn Harrelson and Scott Ferguson. The set design was done by Michael Lapthorn, the costume design by Jennifer Smith, the lighting design by Kenneth Moore, and musical direction by Linda Madonia. It starred Joseph Beal, Dina Joy Byrd, Shulie Cowen, Dori Goldman, George Keating and Thomas Mizer. It ran for a record-breaking eight months. The production transferred to the Body Politic Theater in 1994. It won two After Dark Awards for Outstanding Production and Outstanding Ensemble.

After its off-Broadway run ended in 1996, the show moved back to Chicago and performed at the Victory Gardens Theatre and then at The Theatre Building. It finished its run on March 2, 1997. Since then, the show has continued day-time performances at schools and youth organizations in Chicago.

=== Off-Broadway production ===
In June 1995, the production moved to the off-Broadway Atlantic Theatre, and later Lamb's Theatre. It starred Thomas Mizer as Tom and featured George Keating, Dori Goldman, Joseph Beal, Melissa Hartman, Dina Joy Bird, and Amy L. Hansted. The production closed in 1996 after an eleven-month run.

=== National tours ===
After a successful production in Toronto, the show launched a national tour in Indianapolis in September 1997. Troupe America produced two more tours opening in 1999 and 2000.

== Plot ==
Tom, a young teacher, is preparing for his first day of teaching. As he nervously rehearses what he's going to say, he turns on Schoolhouse Rock! Soon, personifications of his emotions appear. There's George – the romantic facet, Dori – the goofy facet, Shulie – the sweet aspect, Joe – the cool facet, and Dina – the mature facet. They intend to teach him so he's ready for his job.

In their first lesson to him, they cover grammar ("Verb: That's What's Happening"). They tell him that they represent anywhere he has been, each person he has recognized and met ("A Noun Is A Person, Place Or Thing"). They help Tom realize that teaching is as easy as counting to three ("Three Is a Magic Number"). Tom thinks he is hallucinating and tries to get rid of them, but he realizes that he needs them ("Mother Necessity"). They encourage Tom to remember that he wants to be a teacher because both his grandmother and her mother were teachers. In their lifetimes, teaching was one of the few job opportunities open to women ("Sufferin' 'til Suffrage"). He also remembers working at his grandfather's hardware store as a child and sneaking away on Saturday mornings to watch Schoolhouse Rock!, which taught him about adverbs ("Lolly, Lolly, Lolly") and adjectives ("Unpack Your Adjectives"). But Tom has to teach more than that – math, science and social studies ("Just a Bill" / "The Preamble"). By revisiting these moments from his childhood and getting caught up in them, Tom remembers that learning can be fun ("Ready or Not, Here I Come").

When the gang becomes exhausted from all of the excitement, Tom encourages them to stay active ("Do the Circulation"). Joe is ready to do a song about pronouns, but he needs some help from the group ("Rufus Xavier Sarsaparilla"). Shulie plays Tom's guitar; the instrument is shaped like a figure eight, which inspires her to remember how Tom learned multiplication tables ("Figure Eight"). Next, George gives a physics lesson using rock and roll ("A Victim of Gravity"). Staying on the math and science track, George and Shulie introduce a hero who changed counting forever ("Zero, My Hero").

Although they have covered many parts of speech, Tom remembers one that they have left out, conjunctions ("Conjunction Junction"). Joe reminds Tom that school will be a very important transition to America for many of his students who are not native English speakers, just as America went through an important transition as it expanded ("Great American Melting Pot / Elbow Room"). Shulie teaches a lesson about space ("Interplanet Janet") and the thought of going to the Moon gets the whole group energized. They use words that properly express the energy they are feeling ("Interjections"). Tom thanks everyone for helping him. He has one last song for them about sentence structure ("The Tale of Mr. Morton"). As the song ends, all of the characters are gathered around Tom as if he were teaching. He asks if there are any questions, and a student's hand goes up.

== Original cast ==
- Tom – Tom Mizer
- George – George Keating
- Dori – Dori Goldman
- Joe – Joseph Beal
- Shulie – Shulie Cowen
- Dina – Dina Joy Byrd

== Musical numbers ==
- "Verb: That's What's Happening" – Company
- "A Noun Is a Person, Place or Thing" – Dori, company
- "Three Is a Magic Number" – George, company
- "Mother Necessity" – Company
- "Sufferin' Till Suffrage" – Dina, Shulie, Dori
- "Lolly, Lolly, Lolly" – Tom, Joe, George
- "Unpack Your Adjectives" – Shulie, company
- "Just a Bill" – George
- "The Preamble" – Dori, company
- "Ready or Not, Here I Come" – Joe, company
- "Do the Circulation"* – Company
- "Rufus Xavier Sarsaparilla" – Joe
- "Figure Eight" – Shulie
- "A Victim of Gravity" – George, company
- "Zero, My Hero" – George, Shulie
- "Conjunction Junction" – Joe, Dina, Dori, Shulie
- "The Great American Melting Pot" – Dina, Shulie, Dori
- "Elbow Room" – Dori, company
- "Interplanet Janet" – Shulie, company
- "Interjections" – Dina, company
- "The Tale of Mr. Morton" – Tom, company

*In the licensed version, there is an optional intermission after this song.

== Reception ==
Several news stations including CNN, Fox News, MTV News, Entertainment Tonight, and Good Morning America gave the show positive reviews, such as "Nostalgic blast from the past!", "A rollicking, robust stage show," and "People will love it!"

Lou Carlozo from The Chicago Tribune wrote "As a whole, the cast carries the 80-minute show with youthful exuberance and energy, though two standouts should be noted. The first is Keating, who captures the singsong spirit of these educational odes and amplifies it to hilarious heights. The second is Goldman, who shows much promise as a budding comic actress. Her confused facial expressions and snarly singing tone created the hilarious effect of 'I can't believe I'm singing this stuff."

=== Awards and nominations ===
| Year | Award Ceremony | Category | Recipient | Result |
|---|---|---|---|---|
| 1994 | After Dark Awards | Outstanding Production | | Won |
| 1994 | After Dark Awards | Outstanding Ensemble | | Won |

== Sequel ==
A sequel entitled Schoolhouse Rock Live, Too! was created by the same team. The plot follows Nina, the owner of the fading "Conjunction Junction Diner." She receives help from a friendly waitress, a "regular" at the diner, a chef, and Tom. The show features songs such as "The Rockin’ Medley," "Electricity," "Telegraph Line", "Lucky Seven Sampson", "Naughty Number Nine", "Dollars and Sense," and "Good Eleven," and uses "I'm Just a Bill", "Interjections," and "Conjunction Junction," from the first show. It is licensed through Music Theatre International.
