= Dare to Dream =

Dare to Dream may refer to:

== Film ==
- Dare to Dream: The Story of the U.S. Women's Soccer Team, a 2005 American film
- The Secret: Dare to Dream, a 2020 American film

== Music ==
- Dare to Dream (Yanni album), 1992
- Dare to Dream (Billy Gilman album), 2001
- Dare to Dream (Irish Stew of Sindidun album), 2008
- Dare to Dream (Troye Sivan EP), 2007
- "Dare to Dream" (Jo Dee Messina song), 2002
- Dare to Dream (Olympic theme song), performed by Olivia Newton-John and John Farnham during the opening ceremony of the 2000 Summer Olympics

== Theatre ==
- Dare to Dream Jr., a 2025 Disney revue

== Other uses ==
- Dare to Dream: A Study in the Imagination of a Ten-Year-Old Boy, a 1993 video game developed by Cliff Bleszinski and published by Epic Games
- Dare to Dream, the slogan of the Eurovision Song Contest 2019
