= Elbow Room =

Elbow Room may refer to:

== Literature ==
- Elbow Room (Dennett book), a 1984 book by Daniel Dennett
- Elbow Room (short story collection), a 1977 book by James Alan McPherson
- Elbow Room, an 1804 pamphlet by Thomas Gilliland
- Elbow Room, a 1939 poetry collection by Oliver St. John Gogarty

== Music ==
- Elbow Room, a 2005 album by Chris Murphy
- Elbow Room, a 2005 album by Vincent Gardner
- "Elbow Room", a song by John Abercrombie and Ralph Towner from Sargasso Sea

== Other uses ==
- "Elbow Room", an episode of Schoolhouse Rock!
- The Elbow Room, a nightclub in Birmingham, England
- Elbow Room (theatre company), an Australian theatre company that has collaborated with Eryn Jean Norvill

== See also ==
- Elbo Room, a bar in Fort Lauderdale, Florida, US
- Lebensraum, a German expansionary concept
