= Jennifer Cihi =

American actress (born 1966)

Jennifer Marie Cihi
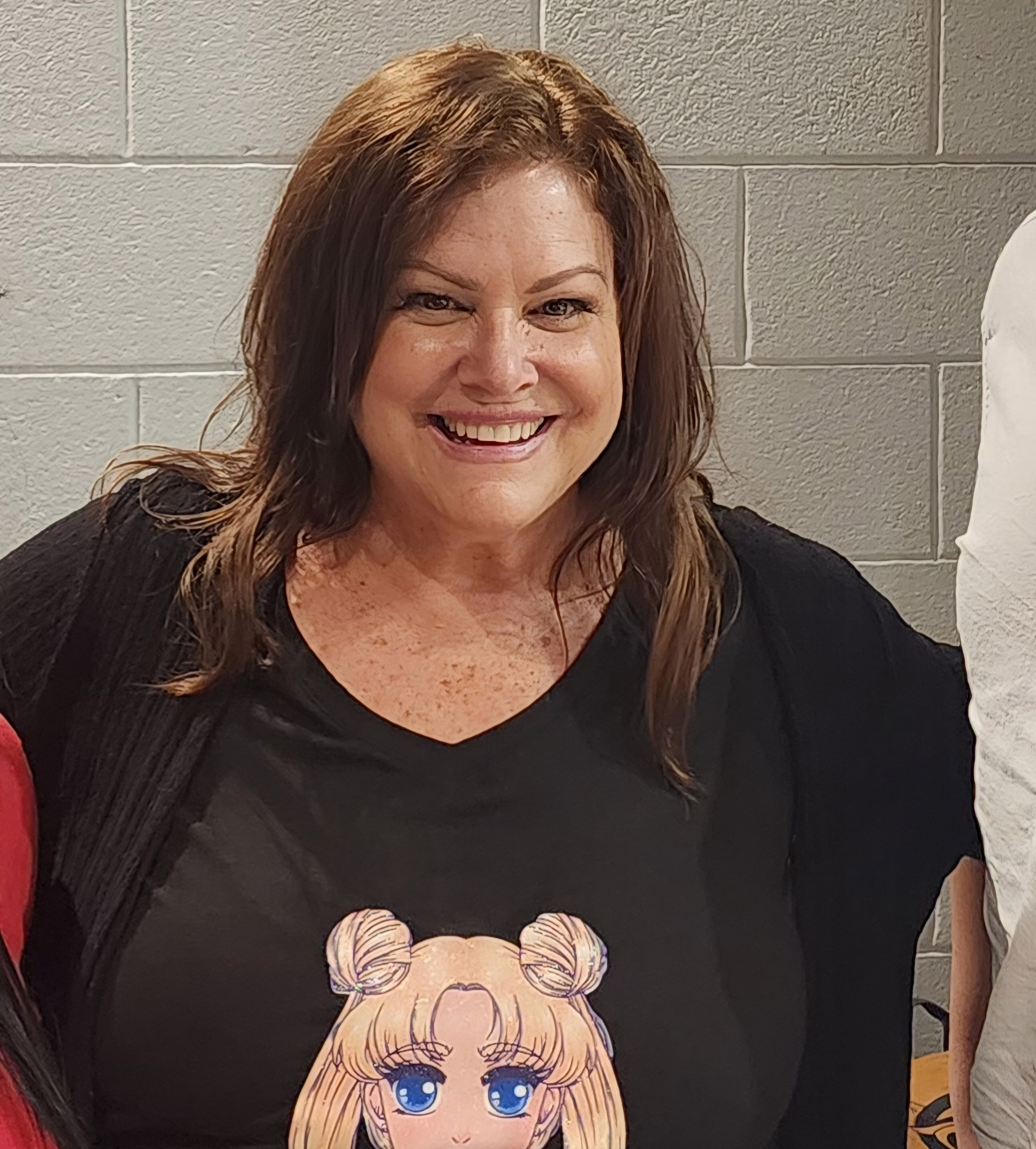
- Cihi at Etown Anime Fest 2024
- Born: April 2, 1966 (age 60); Ossining, New York
- Occupations: Singer, actress, voice artist
- Known for: Sailor Moon, Roundhouse, Broadway's Annie National Tour, Hot Pockets commercial jingle singer

Jennifer Cihi (born April 2, 1966) is an American singer/actress who performed on Broadway, television, commercial jingles and provided several songs for animated series and films. She is best known for being the original English dub singer of Sailor Moon, starring in Nickelodeon's Roundhouse, singing the Hot Pockets national jingle and performing in the Broadway National Tour of Annie.

== Early life ==
Cihi was born in Ossining, New York, but her family moved to the west coast when she was an infant. She grew up in San Jose, California where she performed on stage at Children's Musical Theater San Jose. She had leading roles in The Wizard of Oz and Bye Bye Birdie, along with being a featured performer in a series of productions. She spent a year of middle school on tour with Annie, where she schooled at the theatre between shows. She was an avid skier and swimmer and had a passion for poetry. Cihi graduated from Presentation High School in San Jose, California in 1984.

== Career ==
In 1978, at the age of 12, she was cast in the Broadway Second National Tour of Annie. She played the role of Pepper, the older orphan who bullies Annie, alongside a then unknown Molly Ringwald. The 2nd National Touring Company (sometimes referred to as the West Coast or Los Angeles Production) opened in San Francisco on June 22, 1978. Cihi held the role for a year, before being deemed too tall.

Shortly after high school, Cihi landed a job at Tokyo Disney, where she lived and performed for two years. At that time, she performed on the soundtrack of the anime City Hunter. After returning from Japan, she settled in Los Angeles, where she continued to perform in local theatre shows and sang in professional bands.

In 1993, she joined the cast of Nickelodeon's Roundhouse for season 3 where she sang the theme song, acted in various sketches and sang several solos. She played a variety of roles on the show, which showcased her talents as a comedic actress as well as a singer.

Cihi is probably best known for being the English dub singing voice of Sailor Moon on both the animated series and on the CD recording. She has performed the original Sailor Moon songs at some major comics and anime conventions, including MTAC in Nashville, Tennessee in the summer of 2013; Anime Expo in Los Angeles in July 2014; Malta Comics Expo, Europe's biggest comic con, in Malta in late October 2014; and Triad Anime Convention in North Carolina in March 2015. In July 2015, Cihi performed with iconiQ The Soundtrack Orchestra at the SERASYMPHONY: Sailor Moon Symphony concert in Los Angeles. On January 13 and 14, 2018, she was the main event guest/performer for The Asian Karaoke Idol Invitational's TAKII 24 ~The Power Of Love~ held at The Rotunda.

As of January 2023, Jennifer has appeared at over 80 conventions around the world.

Cihi also sang the original Hot Pockets jingle in a national commercial.

Cihi lives in Nashville, where she has performed with the Pat Patrick Band and Skyline Drive Band at corporate gigs and weddings.

She volunteers, works as a personal chef, and has created her own jewelry line.
