= Jacob Brent =

American actor

- Born: Jacob Brent Bayliff; August 14, 1973 (age 52); Graham, North Carolina, USA
- Occupations: Actor, dancer, director, choreographer.
- Years active: 1993–present

Jacob 'Jazzy' Brent (born August 14, 1973) is an American stage actor who is best known for his portrayal of Magical Mr. Mistoffelees in the video production of Cats which was filmed in 1998.

Brent graduated from the North Carolina School of the Arts in 1991. He holds a Masters of Fine Arts from San Diego State University. He worked with the ALICE workshop, a musical based on Alice in Wonderland, as well as his own showcase at the Sadlers Wells Theatre. In 2002, he worked on choreography for the Elan Awards and the Dance with Dancers Millennium Gala for the New York City Ballet. At Children's Musical Theater San Jose, he directed a 2008 production of Peter Pan as well as a 2009 Spring Production of Leonard Bernstein's Candide.

In 2016, he was appointed assistant professor of dance at Shenandoah University, where he taught until 2019. Brent then moved on to become the head of Musical Theatre at James Madison University until 2021, when he became interim Musical Theatre Head at The University of the Arts. Starting in 2024, he will be joining the faculty of Elon University.

== Career highlights ==
- Starlight Express Las Vegas (Turnov) 1993–94
- Broadway Cats production (Pouncival) 1994–1996
- Broadway Cats production (Mr. Mistoffelees) 1996–1999
- Cats and Making of Cats (Mr. Mistoffelees) 1998
- "The Radio City Music Hall Christmas Spectacular" cast member December 2000 and 2001
- London Cats production (Mr. Mistoffelees) April 2001 – October 2001
- Directed and choreographed Cats production at Finger Lakes Musical Theatre Festival (Auburn, N.Y.), August 21, 2013 – September 11, 2013
