= Schoolhouse Rock! =

American animated musical television series

- Created by: David McCall
- Composer: Bob Dorough
- Country of origin: United States
- Original language: English
- No. of seasons: 7
- No. of episodes: 65 (list of episodes)

Production
- Producers: George Newall; Radford Stone
- Running time: 3 minutes
- Production companies: Scholastic Rock, Inc. ABC

Original release
- Network: ABC (1973–1985, 1993–2000); Disney DVD (2009)
- Release: January 6, 1973 – March 31, 2009

Schoolhouse Rock! is an American interstitial programming series of animated musical educational short films (and later, music videos) which aired during the Saturday morning children's programming block on the US television network ABC. The themes covered included grammar, science, economics, history, mathematics, and civics. The series' original run lasted from 1973 to 1985; it was later revived from 1993 to 1996. Additional episodes were produced in 2009 for direct-to-video release.

== History ==
=== Idea and development ===
The series was the idea of David McCall, an advertising executive of McCaffrey & McCall, who noticed his young son was struggling with learning multiplication tables, despite being able to memorize the lyrics of many Rolling Stones songs. McCall hired musician Bob Dorough to write a song that would teach multiplication, which became "Three Is a Magic Number." Tom Yohe, an illustrator at McCaffrey & McCall, heard the song and created visuals to accompany it. Radford Stone, producer and writer at ABC, suggested they pitch it as a television series, which caught the attention of Michael Eisner, then the senior vice president in charge of programming and development at ABC, and cartoon director Chuck Jones. Production was handled by Scholastic Rock, Inc., a subsidiary of McCaffrey & McCall.

=== Original series ===
The first video of the series, "Three Is a Magic Number," originally premiered during the debut episode of Curiosity Shop on September 2, 1971. The Curiosity Shop version is an extended cut that includes an additional scene/verse of 15 seconds in length that explains the pattern of each set of ten containing three multiples of three, animated in the form of a carnival shooting game. This scene has never been rebroadcast on ABC, nor has it been included in any home media releases; the longer version is, however, available on the soundtrack album, as is an extended version of "My Hero Zero".

Schoolhouse Rock! debuted as a series in January 1973 with Multiplication Rock, a collection of animated music videos adapting the multiplication tables to songs written by Bob Dorough. Dorough also performed most of the songs, with Grady Tate performing two and Blossom Dearie performing one during this season. General Foods was the series' first sponsor; later sponsors of the Schoolhouse Rock! segments also included Nabisco, Kenner Toys, Kellogg's, and McDonald's. During the early 1970s, Schoolhouse Rock was one of several short-form animated educational shorts that aired on ABC's children's lineup; others included Time for Timer and The Bod Squad. Of the three, Schoolhouse Rock was the longest running.

George Newall and Tom Yohe were the executive producers and creative directors of every episode, along with Bob Dorough as musical director. This first season was followed in short order by a second season, run from 1973 to 1975, entitled Grammar Rock, which included nouns, verbs, adjectives, and other parts of speech (such as conjunctions, explained in "Conjunction Junction"). By this point, the seasons were collectively called Scholastic Rock in news articles. For this second season, the show added the services of Jack Sheldon, a member of The Merv Griffin Show house band, as well as Lynn Ahrens; both of them contributed to the series through the rest of its run. Blossom Dearie returned for a second episode, and Essra Mohawk joined the cast as a recurring singer. In contrast to the series name implying rock and roll, most of the artists and songs were performed by jazz musicians; Sheldon noted the irony of the arrangement and how "everybody loved it" anyway.

By 1974, the name Schoolhouse Rock! was used for the series as a whole. A third season, America Rock, began production at the same time as Grammar Rock. It aired in 1975 and 1976, timed to coincide with the United States Bicentennial, and had music videos covering the structure of the United States government (such as "I'm Just a Bill") along with important moments in American history (examples include "The Preamble" and "Mother Necessity").

A fourth series, titled "Science Rock," followed in 1978 and 1979, and included a broad range of science-related topics. The first video of this season, "A Victim of Gravity," parodied elements of the hit film Grease and featured a rare guest appearance from a pop band, with recently reunited doo-wop group the Tokens providing the vocals. In addition to episodes describing the human body's anatomical systems (the nervous, circulatory, skeletal and digestive systems each received a music video), episodes describing physical sciences such as astronomy, meteorology and electricity were also included, as was "The Energy Blues," an environmentalism-themed video.

A fifth follow-up series, titled "Scooter Computer and Mr. Chips," featuring the titular characters (the only music videos in the series to feature any recurring characters), premiered in the early 1980s and comprised just four segments about home computer technology, then just emerging onto the scene. ABC pulled Schoolhouse Rock! as a whole off the air in August 1985 in favor of fitness show ABC Funfit.

=== 1990s ===
The popularity of Schoolhouse Rock! led to an effort to get the show back on the air by student Jennifer Wood in 1991. This eventually happened in 1993 and it came with new content; the original team reunited to produce two more Grammar Rock segments ("Busy Prepositions" and "The Tale of Mr. Morton") for television with J. J. Sedelmaier Productions, Inc. This was followed in 1995 by a new series, "Money Rock," which discussed themes related to money management on both the personal and governmental scale. Episodes from the new series aired in rotation with the original segments from 1993 to 1996.

The Walt Disney Company acquired Schoolhouse Rock in 1996 along with its acquisition of ABC owner Capital Cities/ABC Inc.; Schoolhouse Rock was one of only two non-Disney children's shows (The Bugs Bunny and Tweety Show being the other) to continue airing (albeit in reruns) after the transition to One Saturday Morning. The series as a whole (after 27 years, shortly before the show's 30th anniversary) ceased airing on television in 2000, with newer episodes being released directly to home video. However, reruns occasionally aired on Toon Disney's Big Movie Show block in 2004, but were soon removed from the schedule.

=== 2000s ===
Starting in 2002, the team once again reunited to produce a new song, "I'm Gonna Send Your Vote to College," written by George Newall and performed by Bob Dorough and Jack Sheldon for the 30th Anniversary VHS and DVD releases. For the new song, Tom Yohe Jr. took over as lead designer for his father, Tom Yohe Sr., who had died in 2000. Another contemporary song, "Presidential Minute," also written by George Newall, which explains the process of electing the President of the United States in greater detail, was included on the 2008 DVD Schoolhouse Rock! Election Collection, which centers on songs relating to American history and government.

In 2009, in response to the threat of climate change, a new series of shorts was released directly to DVD, with the title Schoolhouse Rock! Earth. Animations were created by members of the original production team, and 11 environmentally themed songs were written and performed by a combination of veterans of the original series (including Bob Dorough, Jack Sheldon, and Lynn Ahrens) and newcomers such as composer George Stiles and performers Tituss Burgess, Barrett Foa, and Shoshana Bean, all of whom were veterans of Broadway theatre. In a first for the series, an additional 12th song, "The 3 R's," a reworked version of "Three Is a Magic Number" rethemed around the message "reduce, reuse, recycle," was included as a live action music video (starring singer Mitchel Musso) rather than as a new cartoon. Also unique to this iteration of the series was the inclusion of interstitial introductions featuring recurring animated characters created for the DVD, Jack, Bob, and Lou, a trio of Arctic polar bears.

On January 6, 2013, George Newall and Bob Dorough appeared at the Kennedy Center in Washington, D.C., as part of their ongoing series of free concerts on the Millennium Stage. It was deemed the largest attendance to date of the venue. Dorough played five songs, accompanying himself on the piano: "Three Is a Magic Number," "Figure Eight," "Conjunction Junction," "Preamble," and "I'm Just a Bill." (Dorough had only performed lead vocals on the original version of "Three Is a Magic Number"). He also performed "Interjections!" accompanied by DC-area kids' band Rocknoceros. Rocknoceros also performed "Electricity, Electricity," "Unpack Your Adjectives," "Energy Blues," and "Fireworks."

On March 20, 2019, it was announced that Schoolhouse Rock!: The Box Set (1996) was added to the Library of Congress National Recording Registry in its 2018 class.

== Music videos ==
=== Multiplication Rock ===
Episode title	Subject	Music by	Lyrics by	Performed by	Animation & design	First aired
"Three Is a Magic Number"	Multiplication by 3	Bob Dorough		Bob Dorough	Focus Design/Tom Yohe	January 6, 1973
"My Hero, Zero"	Powers of 10	Bob Dorough		Bob Dorough	Focus Design/Tom Yohe	January 13, 1973
"Elementary, My Dear"	Multiplication by 2	Bob Dorough		Bob Dorough	Phil Kimmelman & Associates/Jack Sidebotham	January 27, 1973
"The Four-Legged Zoo"	Multiplication by 4	Bob Dorough		Bob Dorough with kids chorus	Phil Kimmelman & Associates/Bob Eggers & Bill Peckmann	February 10, 1973
"Ready or Not, Here I Come"	Multiplication by 5	Bob Dorough		Bob Dorough	Phil Kimmelman & Associates/Tom Yohe	February 17, 1973
"I Got Six"	Multiplication by 6	Bob Dorough		Grady Tate	Phil Kimmelman & Associates/Tom Yohe	February 24, 1973
"Lucky Seven Sampson"	Multiplication by 7	Bob Dorough		Bob Dorough	Phil Kimmelman & Associates/Rowland B. Wilson	February 24, 1973
"Figure Eight"	Multiplication by 8	Bob Dorough		Blossom Dearie	Phil Kimmelman & Associates/Tom Yohe	February 24, 1973
"Naughty Number Nine"	Multiplication by 9	Bob Dorough		Grady Tate	Phil Kimmelman & Associates/Phil Kimmelman & Bill Peckmann	March 17, 1973
"The Good Eleven"	Multiplication by 11	Bob Dorough		Bob Dorough	Focus Design/Jack Sidebotham	March 24, 1973
"Little Twelvetoes"	Multiplication by 12, base 12	Bob Dorough		Bob Dorough	Phil Kimmelman & Associates/Rowland B. Wilson	March 31, 1973

- No shows were produced featuring the number 1 explicitly, though several of them, including "Elementary, My Dear," do include this number. "My Hero, Zero" introduced the subject of how to use zero for multiplying by 10, 100, and 1,000. "Little Twelvetoes" introduced the subject of how math arranged on base 12 rather than on base 10 would work, as well as covering multiplication by 12.
- In 1973, Capitol/EMI Records released a soundtrack album of Multiplication Rock (SJA-11174), featuring all 11 songs. Two tracks, "My Hero, Zero" and "Three Is a Magic Number," had been edited for TV to keep each video within three minutes. This LP features both songs in their full, uncut forms. Also, the album version of "The Four-Legged Zoo" has a slightly shorter ending compared with the television version. Released with the album was a single (Capitol/EMI 3693) with the two Grady Tate–sung tracks ("Naughty Number Nine" backed with "I Got Six"). This album was re-released on Record Store Day 2019 by UMe on red/blue-colored vinyl.

=== Grammar Rock ===
Episode title	Subject	Music by	Lyrics by	Performed by	Animation & design	First broadcast
"A Noun Is a Person, Place, or Thing"	noun	Lynn Ahrens			Phil Kimmelman & Associates/Jack Sidebotham	September 15, 1973
"Verb: That's What's Happening"	verb	Bob Dorough		Zachary Sanders	Phil Kimmelman & Associates/Tom Yohe & Bill Peckmann	September 22, 1973
"Conjunction Junction"	conjunction	Bob Dorough		Jack Sheldon, Terry Morel, and Mary Sue Berry	Phil Kimmelman & Associates/Tom Yohe & Bill Peckmann	November 17, 1973
"Interjections!"	interjection	Lynn Ahrens		Essra Mohawk	Phil Kimmelman & Associates/Tom Yohe	February 23, 1974
"Unpack Your Adjectives"	adjective	George R. Newall		Blossom Dearie feat. Bob Dorough	Phil Kimmelman & Associates/Tom Yohe	March 2, 1974
"Lolly, Lolly, Lolly, Get Your Adverbs Here"	adverb	Bob Dorough	Bob Dorough		Phil Kimmelman & Associates/Jack Sidebotham	April 13, 1974
"Rufus Xavier Sarsaparilla"	pronoun	Bob Dorough	Kathy Mandry	Jack Sheldon	Kim and Gifford Productions/Paul Kim & Lew Gifford	April 27, 1976
"Busy Prepositions"	preposition	Bob Dorough	Bob Dorough	Jack Sheldon and Bob Dorough	J. J. Sedelmaier Prod./Bill Peckmann	September 11, 1993
"The Tale of Mr. Morton"	subject and predicate	Lynn Ahrens		Jack Sheldon	J. J. Sedelmaier Prod./Tom Yohe Jr.	September 11, 1993

- This segment introduces Jack Sheldon and Lynn Ahrens as series regulars. "Conjunction Junction" and "A Noun Is a Person, Place, or Thing" were Sheldon and Ahrens' debuts on Schoolhouse Rock! respectively.
- "Busy Prepositions" (a.k.a. "Busy P's") and "The Tale of Mr. Morton" were produced for Schoolhouse Rock!'s return to ABC in 1993 with J.J. Sedelmaier Productions, Inc. producing the animation.

=== America Rock ===
Episode title	Subject	Music by	Lyrics by	Performed by	Animation & design	First broadcast
"No More Kings"	American Independence	Lynn Ahrens		Lynn Ahrens & Bob Dorough	Kim and Gifford Productions/Paul Kim & Lew Gifford	September 20, 1975
"The Shot Heard Round the World"	American Revolutionary War	Bob Dorough			Kim and Gifford Productions/Jack Sidebotham	October 11, 1975
"The Preamble"	United States Constitution	Lynn Ahrens			George Cannata/Tom Yohe & George Cannata	October 25, 1975
"Sufferin' 'til Suffrage"	Women's suffrage	Bob Dorough	Tom Yohe	Essra Mohawk	Kim and Gifford Productions/Paul Kim & Lew Gifford	February 21, 1976
"I'm Just a Bill"	Legislative process	Dave Frishberg		Jack Sheldon	Phil Kimmelman & Associates/Tom Yohe	March 13, 1976
"The Great American Melting Pot"	Immigration in America	Lynn Ahrens		Lori Lieberman	Kim and Gifford Productions/Tom Yohe	April 17, 1976
"Elbow Room"	Territorial evolution of the United States	Lynn Ahrens		Sue Manchester	Kim and Gifford Productions/Paul Kim & Lew Gifford	May 8, 1976
"Fireworks"	Declaration of Independence	Lynn Ahrens		Grady Tate	Phil Kimmelman & Associates/Tom Yohe	July 3, 1976
"Mother Necessity"	Invention, American Industrial Revolution	Bob Dorough		Bob Dorough, Blossom Dearie, Lynn Ahrens, Essra Mohawk, and Jack Sheldon	Kim and Gifford Productions/Jack Sidebotham	July 10, 1976
"Three-Ring Government"	Branches of government	Lynn Ahrens			Phil Kimmelman & Associates/Arnold Roth	March 6, 1979
"I'm Gonna Send Your Vote to College"	Electoral College	Bob Dorough		Jack Sheldon, Bob Dorough, Lisa Clark, Vicki McClure, and Sue Raney	Phil Kimmelman & Associates/Tom Yohe Jr.	August 27, 2002
"Presidential Minute (The Campaign Trail)"	Voting for the President	George Newall		Jack Sheldon		August 27, 2002

- "I'm Gonna Send Your Vote to College" and "Presidential Minute" were produced for DVD.

"Three Ring Government" had its airdate pushed back due to ABC fearing that the Federal Communications Commission, the US federal government, and Congress would object to having their functions and responsibilities being compared to a circus and threaten the network's broadcast license renewal.

=== Science Rock ===
Episode title	Subject	Music by	Lyrics by	Performed by	Animation & design	First aired
"A Victim of Gravity"	Gravity	Lynn Ahrens		The Tokens	Kim and Gifford Productions/Tom Yohe	September 16, 1978
"Interplanet Janet"	The Solar System	Lynn Ahrens		Lynn Ahrens	Kim and Gifford Productions/Jack Sidebotham	November 18, 1978
"The Body Machine"	Nutrition and digestion	Lynn Ahrens		Bob Dorough and Jack Sheldon	Phil Kimmelman & Associates/Tom Yohe	January 6, 1979
"Do the Circulation"	Circulatory system	Lynn Ahrens		Joshie Armstead, Mary Sue Berry, and Maeretha Stewart	Phil Kimmelman & Associates/Tom Yohe	March 10, 1979
"The Energy Blues"	Energy conservation	George Newall		Jack Sheldon	Kim and Gifford Productions/Tom Yohe	March 27, 1979
"Them Not-So-Dry Bones"	Skeletal system	George Newall		Jack Sheldon	Kim and Gifford Productions/Tom Yohe	May 5, 1979
"Electricity, Electricity"	Electricity	Bob Dorough		Zachary Sanders	Kim and Gifford Productions/Paul Kim & Lew Gifford	May 19, 1979
"Telegraph Line"	Nervous system	Lynn Ahrens		Jamie Aff and Christine Langner	Kim and Gifford Productions/Tom Yohe	June 30, 1979
"The Greatest Show on Earth (The Weather Show)"	Weather	Lynn Ahrens		Bob Kaliban	Gerry Ray/Tom Yohe	July 7, 1979

- In the Disney+ version of "Electricity, Electricity," the flashing light visuals for the "electricity" text are toned down to reduce the risk of anyone with photosensitive epilepsy.
- Sometime after its initial airing, "The Greatest Show on Earth," also known as "The Weather Show," was pulled from broadcast rotation because the Ringling Bros. and Barnum & Bailey Circus objected to its use of their trademark slogan (which was in the questioned title) and filed a lawsuit against the network for copyright infringement. As a result, after the 1987 release, it was not included on any other VHS release.

=== Computer Rock (Scooter Computer & Mr. Chips) ===
Episode title	Subject	Music by	Lyrics by	Performed by	Animation & design	First aired
"Introduction"	Uses of computer	Bob Dorough	Tom Yohe	Darrell Stern & Bob Kaliban	Kim and Gifford Productions/Tom Yohe	January 1, 1982
"Hardware"	Misconceptions around computers	Dave Frishberg	Dave Frishberg	Darrell Stern & Bob Kaliban	Kim and Gifford Productions/Paul Kim and Lew Gifford	January 1, 1982
"Software"	Binary code and Computer basic	Lynn Ahrens	Lynn Ahrens	Darrell Stern & Bob Kaliban	Kim and Gifford Productions/Tom Yohe	January 1, 1983
"Number Cruncher"	Computational mathematics	Dave Frishberg	Dave Frishberg	Darrell Stern & Bob Kaliban	Kim and Gifford Productions/Paul Kim and Lew Gifford	January 1, 1984

=== Money Rock ===
Episode title	Subject	Music by	Lyrics by	Performed by	Animation & design	First aired
"Dollars and Sense"	Interest and loans	Dave Frishberg	Dave Frishberg	Val Hawk and Bob Dorough	J. J. Sedelmaier Prod./Tom Yohe	September 10, 1994
"Tax Man Max"	Taxes	Stephen Flaherty	Lynn Ahrens	Patrick Quinn	Phil Kimmelman & Associates/Phil Kimmelman	June 26, 1995
"Where the Money Goes"	Family bills and expenses	Rich Mendoza	Rich Mendoza	Jack Sheldon	Phil Kimmelman & Associates/Bill Peckmann	July 13, 1995
"$7.50 Once a Week"	Personal budget	Dave Frishberg			Phil Kimmelman & Associates/Jack Sidebotham	October 23, 1995
"Tyrannosaurus Debt"	Budget deficit and United States national debt	Tom Yohe		Bob Dorough and Bob Kaliban	Phil Kimmelman & Associates/Tom Yohe	January 21, 1996
"This for That"	Barter and the history of currency	George Newall		Bob Dorough	Phil Kimmelman & Associates/Phil Kimmelman	May 6, 1996
"Walkin' on Wall Street"	Stock exchange	Dave Frishberg			Phil Kimmelman & Associates/Bill Peckmann	September 12, 1996
"The Check's in the Mail"	Using checks	Bob Dorough		Luther Rix and Bob Dorough	Phil Kimmelman & Associates/Bill Peckmann	November 22, 1996

=== Earth Rock ===
Episode title	Subject	Music by	Lyrics by	Performed by	Animation & design	First aired
"Report from the North Pole"	Climate change	Bob Dorough	George Newall	Bob Dorough, Jack Sheldon, Bob Kaliban and Barry Carl	Phil Kimmelman & Associates/Tom Yohe Jr.	March 31, 2009
"The Little Things We Do"	Energy conservation	Lynn Ahrens		Lynn Ahrens, Jack Sheldon, Bob Dorough, Bob Kaliban, Val Hawk, Vicki Doney and Nancy Reed	Phil Kimmelman & Associates/Tom Yohe Jr.	March 31, 2009
"The Trash Can Band"	Recycling	Lynn Ahrens		Lynn Ahrens, Luther Rix, Bob Dorough and Eric Weissberg	Phil Kimmelman & Associates/Tom Yohe Jr.	March 31, 2009
"You Oughta Be Savin' Water"	Water conservation	Sean Altman and Barry Carl	George Newall	Barry Carl, Sean Altman and Elliott Kerman	Phil Kimmelman & Associates/Phil Kimmelman & Matt Sheridan	March 31, 2009
"The Rainforest"	Rainforests	Lynn Ahrens		Tituss Burgess	Buzzco/Candy Kugel	March 31, 2009
"Save the Ocean"	Oceans	Sean Altman & Andy Brick	Sean Altman	Sean Altman, Inna Dukach, Jon Spurney, Patti Rothberg, Barry Carl, and Eric Booker	Phil Kimmelman & Associates/Tom Yohe Jr. & John Aoshima	March 31, 2009
"Fat Cat Blue: The Clean Rivers Song"	Marine debris	Andy Brick		Jack Sheldon, Bob Kaliban, Val Hawk & Vicki Doney and Nancy Reed	Phil Kimmelman & Associates/Bill Peckmann & John Aoshima	March 31, 2009
"A Tiny Urban Zoo"	Gardens	George Stiles	Anthony Drewe	Barrett Foa, Shoshana Bean, and George Stiles	Kurtz & Friends/Philip Pignotti, Bob Kurtz & Matt Sheridan	March 31, 2009
"Solar Power to the People"	Solar energy	Lynn Ahrens		Lynn Ahrens, Val Hawk, Vicki Doney, and Nancy Reed	Phil Kimmelman & Associates/Jack Sidebotham, Matt Sheridan	March 31, 2009
"Windy and the Windmills"	Wind power	Bob Dorough	George Newall	Bob Dorough, Jack Sheldon, Val Hawk, Vicki Doney, and Nancy Reed	W/M Animation/David Wachtenheim & Phil Kimmelman	March 31, 2009
"Don't Be a Carbon Sasquatch"	Carbon footprints	Bob Dorough	Bob Dorough		Michael Sporn Animation/Phil Kimmelman	March 31, 2009
"The 3 R's"	Reduce, Reuse, Recycle	Bob Dorough	Jack Johnson	Mitchel Musso	N/A	March 31, 2009

- These songs did not air on ABC. They premiered on a DVD released in 2009. They were also available for purchase on iTunes.

== Tie-ins ==
Several tie-ins were released in 1995:

- Schoolhouse Rock! Rocks, a tribute album featuring covers of Schoolhouse Rocks songs performed by popular music artists (see below).
- Schoolhouse Rock! The Official Guide (ISBN 0-7868-8170-4), written by Tom Yohe and George Newall, and including synopses, lyrics, and production notes about each of the shorts created to date, except "The Weather Show," which was the subject of pending litigation and so could not be included. "The Weather Show" was shown with all the other Science Rock episodes in 1979. The book was updated in 2023 to coincide with the 50th anniversary of the show, with songs added from Money Rock.
- The Schoolhouse Rock Songbook (Cherry Lane Music), containing sheet music for 10 songs.
- Schoolhouse Rock! Soundtrack The 4-CD release with bonus tracks on each CD was released on June 18, 1996, by Rhino Records.

The Best of Schoolhouse Rock (ISBN 1-56826-927-7) was released in 1998 jointly by American Broadcasting Companies, Inc. and Rhino Records.

=== Home video ===
A 1987 production of the series for VHS tapes released by Golden Book Video featured Cloris Leachman opening the collection and some songs with child dancers and singers. America Rock was called History Rock for this release; a 1988 review praised it for its handling of complicated events, though it noted that "Elbow Room" had "gushed" over westward expansion without mentioning that Indigenous Americans were displaced in the process. Three songs (namely "Three Ring Government," "The Good Eleven," and "Little Twelvetoes") were not included on the videos.

In 1994, ABC/King Features sold exclusive licensing rights for apparel to Coastal Concepts, Inc. of Vista California, the first company to produce Schoolhouse Rock! apparel. Tom Yohe worked with contemporary artist Skya Nelson to create over 50 new designs and update the Schoolhouse Rock! image for a new market, which sold $1.1 million in its first year and exploded selling over $12 million the next year. A variety of bands working with Rhino Records were furnished with newly minted Schoolhouse Rock! T-shirts for the music videos youth market. The licensing rights were expanded to include other manufacturers in 1996.

On August 8, 1995, Paramount Home Video re-released four segments of Schoolhouse Rock! on VHS with alternative covers and a revamped opening. That same year, ABC Video and Image Entertainment released two volumes of Schoolhouse Rock! on LaserDisc, Schoolhouse Rock! Volume 1: Multiplication Rock and Grammar Rock (ID3245CC), and Schoolhouse Rock! Volume 2: America Rock and Science Rock (ID3383CC). For both volumes, the first side was in the CLV Extended Play format and the second was in the frame-accessible CAV format, and both contained CX-encoded analog and digital audio soundtracks. The "Grammar Rock" volume included the 1993 shorts "Busy Prepositions" and "The Tale of Mr. Morton". The VHS Grammar Rock release was listed on Billboard's top video sales for the week ending December 16, 1995.

In 1997–1998, for the show's 25th anniversary, Walt Disney Home Video, which became a sister company to ABC after their purchase in 1996, released five segments on VHS, along with "Money Rock" being released in 1998. The other four releases in the 25th anniversary collection each ended with a Schoolhouse Rock! Rocks music video.

On August 27, 2002, Walt Disney Home Entertainment released a two-DVD set to coincide with the 30th anniversary of the show. The set features 52 of the 53 episodes that had been produced up to that point, including three of the lost "Computer Rock" segments, with the exception of "Introduction". "The Weather Show" and "Presidential Minute" are found on the bonus disc, the former in modified form with the problematic lyric removed, and the latter viewable only upon completing the "Earn Your Diploma" Trivia Game. An abbreviated VHS, featuring 25 episodes (ranked on the tape in order of popularity) and "I'm Gonna Send Your Vote to College", was released at the same time.

In 2008, DVDs of the individual Schoolhouse Rock! series were released for classroom use.

On September 23, 2008, Schoolhouse Rock! Election Collection was released, including 14 songs about American history and the government and a "new to DVD" song.

On March 31, 2009, Walt Disney Studios Home Entertainment released Schoolhouse Rock! Earth, including 11 newly written and animated songs, as well as "Energy Blues".

On June 5, 2020, a majority of the shorts were made available for streaming on Disney+, with a disclaimer stating the shorts contain "outdated cultural depictions."

DVD name	Ep #	Release date	Additional information
Schoolhouse Rock! Special 30th Anniversary Edition	52	August 27, 2002	All 46 original music videos; Audio Commentary; "I'm Gonna Send Your Vote to College" Making Of; "The Weather Show"; Top 10 Jukebox; Top 20 Countdown; "Earn Your Diploma" Trivia Game (plays "Presidential Minute" once you have earned your diploma); Arrange-a-Song Puzzle; 4 Music Videos by Contemporary Artists; Emmy Awards Featurette; "Three Is a Magic Number" Nike Commercial; "I'm Gonna Send Your Vote to College" in DTS 5.1 Surround; "Computer Rock" segments
Schoolhouse Rock! Election Collection	14	September 23, 2008	Includes all of the "America Rock" songs except "Elbow Room", plus "The Energy Blues" from Science Rock, and "Tax Man Max", "Walkin' on Wall Street" and "Tyrannosaurus Debt" from Money Rock; Bonus song: "Presidential Minute"; Map of the United States
Schoolhouse Rock! Earth	13	March 31, 2009	11 all-new songs about conservation; Bonus Song: "Energy Blues"; Music video: "The Three R's" by Mitchel Musso

=== Tribute albums ===
Schoolhouse Rocks the Vote! album cover

In 1996, the album Schoolhouse Rock! Rocks was released by Rhino Records, with fifteen covers of Schoolhouse Rock songs including the theme. Covers by notable artists included "Three is a Magic Number" by Blind Melon, "No More Kings" by Pavement, "The Shot Heard 'Round the World" by Ween, "My Hero, Zero" by The Lemonheads and "Verb: That's What's Happening" by Moby.

On August 18, 1998, Rhino also released Schoolhouse Rocks the Vote!: A Benefit for Rock the Vote, a tribute album containing covers and original songs in the style of Schoolhouse Rock!, all with an electoral theme. It was released as a fundraiser for Rock the Vote, an organization advocating for political awareness and voting among young people. Several well-known artists contributed tracks to the album, including Isaac Hayes, Joan Osborne, The Sugarhill Gang and The Roots, alongside original Schoolhouse Rock! performers Bob Dorough, Essra Mohawk and Grady Tate.

Schoolhouse Rocks the Vote! track listing
Track	Title	Artist	Type
1	"Rock the Vote"	The Virtuals	
2	"I'm Just a Bill"	Isaac Hayes, Joan Osborne	Cover
3	"Sufferin' Till Suffrage"	Etta James	Cover
4	"The Campaign Trail"	Bob Dorough	Cover
5	"The Preamble"	John Popper	Cover
6	"Do You Wanna Party?"	Essra Mohawk	Original
7	"Fireworks"	The Sugarhill Gang	Cover
8	"Three-Ring Government"	The Roots, Jazzyfatnastees	Cover
9	"Get to Know Your Electoral College"	Spicy T & Shihan	Original
10	"Messin' With My Bill of Rights!"	Grady Tate	Original

== Schoolhouse Rock Live! ==
A musical theatre adaptation of the show, titled Schoolhouse Rock Live!, premiered in 1993. It featured a collaboration between artists Scott Ferguson, Kyle Hall, George Keating, Lynn Ahrens, Bob Dorough, Dave Frishberg, and Kathy Mandry, utilizing some of the most famous songs of Newall and Yohe.

A follow-up production entitled Schoolhouse Rock Live, Too, written by the same team as Schoolhouse Rock Live!, premiered in Chicago in 2000.

== 50th Anniversary Singalong ==
A musical television special celebrating 50 years of Schoolhouse Rock! titled Schoolhouse Rock! 50th Anniversary Singalong aired on February 1, 2023.

== See also ==
- Look and Read (songs)
- The Metric Marvels
