= Thomas Yohe =

American animator (1937–2000)

Thomas George Yohe (1937–2000) was an American animator, known primarily as a co-creator of the educational animated television series Schoolhouse Rock!.

== Biography ==
Yohe was born in Queens, New York, and graduated from Syracuse University with a degree in fine arts. His career began as an art director at Young & Rubicam in 1961, and in 1964 he moved to McCaffrey & McCall. In 1984, Yohe joined Grey Global Group, where he worked until November 2000.

Yohe co-created Schoolhouse Rock!, an animated educational series developed to support ABC's children's programming efforts. The series debuted in 1973 with "Three Is a Magic Number," which featured Yohe's animation. The show gained widespread popularity and received an Emmy Award. Schoolhouse Rock! consisted of around 40 segments aired between 1973 and 1985, each approximately three minutes long, teaching grammar, mathematics, science, and American history. Notable segments included "Conjunction Junction," "Three Is a Magic Number," and "I'm Just a Bill." In the 1990s, Schoolhouse Rock experienced renewed interest among college audiences. Theaterbam Chicago created a live theatrical version titled Schoolhouse Rock Live!, which toured educational institutions and theaters. A follow-up production, Schoolhouse Rock Live Too!, was also staged.
