= Richard Link =

Canadian composer

Richard Link is a Canadian composer, musical director, teacher, and performer presently living in London, England. An accomplished pianist, he often music directs, conducts, and plays for his own productions.

== Personal history and education ==
Link was born in Medicine Hat, Alberta, Canada. After graduating from high school, he moved to Edmonton, Alberta, where he attended the University of Alberta and graduated with a bachelor of music degree. He worked professionally in Edmonton as a composer, musical director, and teacher until 1996 when he moved to San Francisco, California. He studied kinesiology and taught musical theatre at San Francisco State University.

He attended John F. Kennedy University where he completed a master's degree in Holistic Health Education. In his masters thesis Art as a Spiritual Practice, he developed a new methodology for teaching performing arts. His thesis asserts that honoring the individual—and focusing on the process, not the product—creates the best possible performance, and ironically, the best final product.

In 2006, Link moved to London, where he continues to compose, teach, music direct, and perform.

As a teacher of musical performance and composition, Richard has mentored students in Canada, the United States, and the UK, including:

Lecturer and Course Leader of the Actor Musician Program, London College of Music (2010–2021)

Guest Lecturer at Chichester University (2021)

== Compositions – Theatre ==
The majority of Link's compositions are musical theatre and choral works. He has also scored music for film, video, television, and dance.

His musical theatre works include over 15 one- and two-act musicals, plus music for plays and incidental music. Musicals include Wrenched, Popsicle Puppets are Essential Too, A Little Princess, Alberto the Dancing Alligator, Dream World, The Painter's Dream, and Watch Me Shine. Three of his musicals were written for Children's Musical Theater San Jose as part of their "Theater as Digital Activity (TADA)" program.

Link has written an extensive body of choral music, both secular and sacred. Secular works include three choral works, Songs for Us, Woven Together, and Four Seasons, all for SATB mixed chorus. He's also written song cycles and art songs, mostly for one or two voices and piano, and has set three of Vikram Seth's poems to music. His sacred music compositions include anthems and liturgical music.

Link has also crafted popular music. He teamed with Niall Vignoles, co-writing and playing on all songs on the full-length CD "Hard As Nails".

Heels of Glory had a three-week run at the Chelsea Theatre in London in June 2016 and was chosen by Live Theatre UK as one of the top 10 new musicals in June 2016.

Six Nights in Naples was performed at the London College of Music in November 2015 and at the Charing Cross Theatre in June 2016.

Gideon’s Dream was performed at the Theater Nestroyhof Hamakan in Vienna in 2008 and at the San Francisco Jewish Community Center in 2006.

Recent commissions include:

Lysistrata – London College of Music Nov 2018

Nell Gwynn – LCM March 2018

Twelfth Night – LCM Feb 2018

Doctor Faustus – Ridley College (Canada) March 2018

Vinegar Tom – Ridley College November 2017

Twelfth Night – University of British Columbia 2014

Caucasian Chalk Circle – University of British Columbia Sept 2013; subsequently performed at the University of Michigan Nov 2013 and Ridley College Feb 2016

The Book of Job – Engineered Theatre, Calgary Alberta Feb 2013

== Compositions – Film and Television ==
- Born at Home NFB documentary
- Blood Clan (1990)

== Musical direction ==
Link has directed over 100 shows, from well known shows by contemporary composers to obscure musical theatre pieces. His direction credits are fairly evenly distributed between professional theatre companies, high schools and colleges, fringe theatre, community theatre, and summer stock.

== Awards ==
Winner, 1994/1995 Elizabeth Sterling Haynes Award for outstanding fringe visual or sound design.

Winner, 1992/1993 Elizabeth Sterling Haynes Award for outstanding musical director.

Nominee, 1990/1991 Elizabeth Sterling Haynes Award for outstanding musical direction.

== Sources and external links ==
- Official site
- Children's Musical Theater San Jose
- Elizabeth Haynes Sterling Awards
