= High School Musical 2: On Stage! =

Disney's High School Musical 2: On Stage!
- Official logo
- Music: Antonina Armato; Andy Dodd; Matthew Gerrard; Faye Greenberg; Jamie Houston; Tim James; David Lawrence; Randy Petersen; Robbie Nevil; Kevin Quinn; Adam Watts; Bryan Louiselle
- Book: David Simpatico
- Basis: Based on the Disney Channel Original Movie, High School Musical 2 by Peter Barsocchini
- Productions: 2009 UK/Ireland Tour

Disney's High School Musical 2: On Stage! is the second adaptation of Disney's High School Musical franchise.

== Plot ==
=== Act I ===
It opens up with the Wildcats in Ms. Darbus's room on the eve of summer vacation. Everyone is anxious for the final school bell, except Ms. Darbus who is still teaching. Jason decides to ask Ms. Darbus about her favorite summer memory, much to the disgust of the rest of the class. Halfway through her speech, the final bell rings and the school goes chaotic ("Countdown / What Time Is It?"). Things have been smooth sailing for Troy and Gabriella since their star turn in Juliet and Romeo, but Sharpay vows to win Troy's heart this summer – by any means necessary. With all of the Wildcats desperate for cash, Troy gets a surprise phone call that work has arrived ("What Time Is It") (reprise).

At the Lava Springs Country Club, owned by the Evans family, Sharpay revels in her summer kingdom, surrounded by the club staff and her adoring "Sharpettes" ("Fabulous"). The celebration is cut short when not only Troy, but the entire Wildcats gang, shows up for duty. Mr. Fulton, the club manager, assigns them jobs, starting with cleaning up the kitchen ("Work This Out").

After the Wildcats impress Mr. Fulton with their cleaning ability, Troy and Gabriella go onto the golf course to enjoy a picnic lunch. In the dining room, Kelsi plays a song she wrote for Troy and Gabriella. Among the Wildcats now, Troy gets swept up into the excitement of the song and agrees to sing it with them for the employee number in the talent show ("You Are the Music in Me"). Fulton informs Troy that he's been promoted to assistant golf pro, which comes with honorary membership status and an extreme makeover ("Fabulous – Troy's Transformation").

Despite his previous commitment to Gabriella, Troy allows himself to be talked into singing with Sharpay at the Talent Show. In the midst of his new job and his practices with the college basketball team, Troy begins neglecting his friends. During rehearsal for Ryan and Sharpay's talent show number ("Humuhumunukunukuapua’a"), Sharpay replaces Ryan with Troy. Emotions explode, friendships disintegrate, numbers are pulled from the talent show, and the entire company is angry with Troy ("Act One Finale").

=== Act II ===
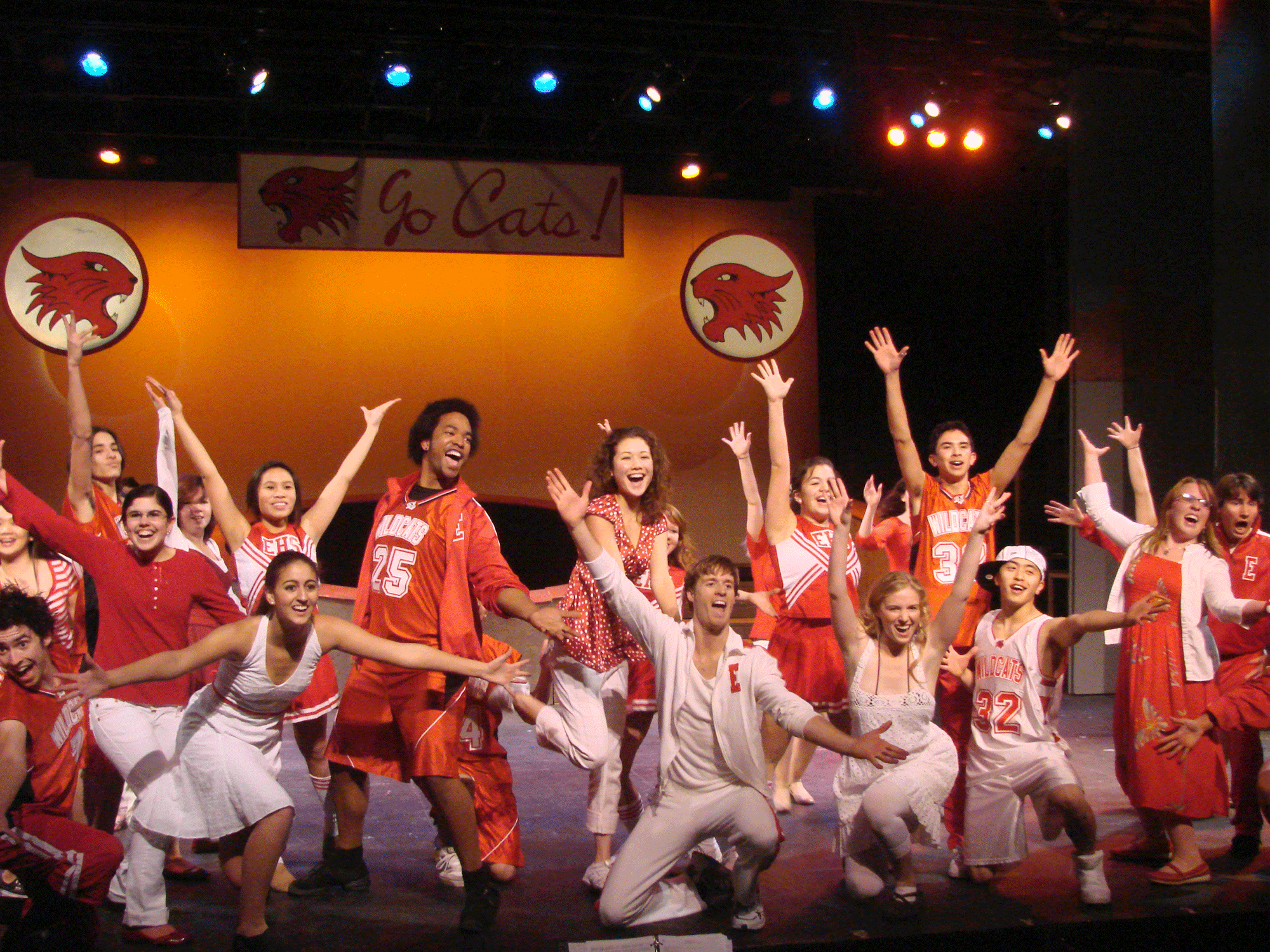
Finale from PacRep Theatre's School of Dramatic Arts production.

During the second week at Lava Springs, Troy rehearses Kelsi's revamped song with Sharpay and the Sharpettes ("You Are the Music in Me – Rock Version"). At the staff baseball game, the Wildcats are missing their team leader, but Gabriella recruits a new 9th man – Ryan. The dubious Chad challenges "dancer boy" Ryan, who not only gets Chad to dance, but helps the Wildcats win the game ("I Don't Dance"). Now officially part of the team, Ryan teaches the gang a new number for the talent show with Chad and Taylor ("Everyday – Rehearsal").

Sharpay, feeling her Star Dazzle Award under siege, directs Fulton to yank the employees from the talent show. This is the last straw for Gabriella, who confronts Sharpay, quits her job, and breaks up with Troy ("Gotta Go My Own Way"). Immediately, the confused and heartbroken Troy looks back at his decisions while the voices of his friends ring through his head ("Bet on It").

Backstage at the 4th of July Midsummer's Night Talent Show, Troy decides to set things straight. He gets his old job back from Fulton, tells Sharpay that as an employee he can't sing with her, and apologizes to the Wildcats. Troy reconciles with Chad and the Wildcats, and in response to a suggestion from Ryan, agrees to sing with Sharpay. After a heart to heart with Troy, Sharpay sees the error of her ways and arranges for Gabriella to come back and sing with Troy, and for Ryan to do his number with the Wildcats ("Every Day"), earning him the Star Dazzle Award. Now reconciled, the entire company celebrates the summer ("All for One").

== Characters ==
- Troy Bolton – good-looking teen dreamboat, star of the basketball team and school icon; loves to sing with Gabriella; obsessed with getting a summer job and nailing a full basketball scholarship; gets a job at the country club due to Sharpay's secret plot to steal him away from Gabriella.
- Gabriella Montez – the new girl in school; pretty, shy, and possesses a fantastic voice when she sings with Troy; she is also the smartest girl in the Southwest; gets a job as a lifeguard at the country club and expects to have the best summer of her life with her new friends; in for a rude awakening as Sharpay tries to steal Troy away from her.
- Sharpay Evans – beautiful and egocentric star of the school musicals; Ryan's older twin, she is the alpha dog of the two, and has a mad crush on Troy; she never met a mirror she didn't like; looking forward to a summer by the pool at her dad's country club, and to stealing Troy away from Gabriella; she will stop at nothing to get what she wants.
- Ryan Evans – Sharpay's fraternal twin brother, he is a star in the making; loves singing, dancing and lots of attention; follows Sharpay's orders, but wants to break free from her shadow; he and Sharpay have a falling-out, and he joins the Wildcats to try to beat his sister for the Star Dazzle Award.
- Chad Danforth – hot-wired jock, second in command to Troy; trying to save money to buy a car so he can take Taylor out to the drive-in movies; gets a job at the country club, but gets all the dirty jobs, while Troy is treated like royalty; sibling rivalry steams up between Troy and him.
- Taylor McKessie – head brainiac of the school, she is the president of the Science Club; Chad's girlfriend; gets hired as Fulton's assistant, and tries to warn Gabriella and Chad about Sharpay's plans to get Troy over to the dark side.
- Kelsi Nielsen – diminutive musical genius; wants to write the great American musical for Troy and Gabriella; gets hired to play the complete Muzak Elevator Songbook during meals at the country club; gets sucked into Sharpay's plans against her will.
- Jack Scott – the techno nerd school announcer; awkward and gawky when not making the announcements, but as soon as he gets behind a microphone, he turns into "The Velvet Fog of East High"; has a crush on Kelsi.
- Zeke Baylor – basketball jock who loves to cook top-notch cuisine; has a crush on Sharpay, who dumps him in the first scene; gets a job assisting the chef at the country club; vows to win back Sharpay by sending her pastries at the country club.
- Martha Cox – member of the Science Club; fun-loving side-kicky personality; loves hip-hop dancing; becomes adoring devotee of Gabriella; one of the gang; hired to cut onions at the country club.
- Violet, Blossom, and Peaches – the "Sharpettes" – three Sharpay-wannabes; teen socialites who provide both social and musical back-up to Sharpay.
- Oberon T. Fulton – the henpecked hatchet man for Sharpay; Assistant Manager at the country club, dreams of being the General Manager someday; a meticulous control freak who is never without his stopwatch and boatswain's whistle; actually a nice guy underneath the authoritarian surface; hates having to cater to Sharpay's demands, but he has a mortgage to pay.
- Ripper – An additional "skater" Wildcat.
- Ms. Darbus (voice-over) – Head of the East High Drama Department.
- Redhawks Player (voice-over)
- Makeover artists – Dermatologists, Tailors, Hairdressers, Valet
- Talent show contestants – Rowena Waggenheim, Billy Flatley, Rosette Shimshank, Theresa Templeton, Janey Fire
- Ensemble Other Wildcats, Lava Springs Pool Boys, Cheerleaders, Country Club Members

== Original Cast ==
Character	UK tour 2009-2010
Troy	Liam Doyle
Gabriella	Nikki Mae
Sharpay	Lauren Hall
Ryan	Matt Kennedy
Mr Fulton	Les Dennis

== Musical numbers ==
=== Act I ===
- Countdown – Company
- What Time Is It – Company
- Scene One (pt.1) – Jocks and Brainiacs
- What Time Is It (Reprise) – Company
- Fabulous – Sharpay, Sharpettes, Pool Boys, and Ryan
- What Time Is It (Exit) – Chad and Wildcats
- Work This Out – Wildcats
- Picnic – Gabriella and Troy
- You Are the Music in Me (Part 1) – Kelsi
- You Are the Music in Me (Part 2) – Kelsi
- You Are the Music in Me (Part 3) – Kelsi, Gabriella, Troy, and Wildcats
- Fabulous (Troy's Transformation) – Sharpay, Sharpettes, Fulton, Ryan, and Makeover Artists
- Humuhumunukunukapua'a (Part 1) – Kelsi, Sharpettes, and Pool Boys
- Humuhumunukunukapua'a (Part 2) – Kelsi, Sharpay, Sharpettes, Ryan, and Pool Boys
- Act One Finale – Company

=== Act II ===
- You Are the Music in Me (Rock Version) – Sharpay, Sharpettes, and Troy
- You Are the Music in Me (Tag) – Sharpay, Sharpettes, and Troy
- I Don't Dance – Ryan, Chad, and Wildcats
- "Every Day" Rehearsal (Part 1) – Wildcats
- "Every Day" Rehearsal (Part 2) – Wildcats
- "Every Day" Rehearsal (Part 3) – Wildcats
- Fabulous (Sharpay's Triumph) – Sharpay and Sharpettes
- Gotta Go My Own Way – Gabriella and Troy
- Bet on It – Troy and Voices in Troy's Head
- Every Day – Troy, Gabriella, Ryan, and Wildcats
- All For One (Finale) – Company
- Megamix (Bows) – Company

== Productions ==
Like the original High School Musical, the show has been adapted into 2 different productions: A one-act, 70-minute version and a 2-act full length production. This stage production includes the song "Humhumunukunukuapua'a" that was left out of the original release, but included on the DVD. Through Music Theatre International, Disney Theatrical began licensing the theatrical rights in October 2008. MTI had originally recruited 7 schools to serve as tests for the full-length adaptation, but due to complications with multiple drafts of both the script and the score, all but one school was forced to drop out of the pilot program.

In 2009 a full production launched as a UK tour starting from the New Wimbledon Theatre in London and running across the country. The tour ended earlier than planned, closing in February 2010, instead of May 2010. The cast included Liam Doyle as Troy, Nikki Mae as Gabriella Montez, Matt Kennedy as Ryan Evans, Lauren Hall as Sharpay Evans and Les Dennis as Mr Fulton.
