= Willy Wonka (musical) =

Musical by Leslie Bricusse, Anthony Newley, and Timothy Allen McDonald

Roald Dahl's Willy Wonka
- Music: Leslie Bricusse; Anthony Newley
- Lyrics: Leslie Bricusse; Anthony Newley
- Book: Leslie Bricusse; Timothy Allen McDonald
- Basis: Charlie and the Chocolate Factory by Roald Dahl

Roald Dahl's Willy Wonka, also known simply as Willy Wonka, is a musical with music and lyrics by Leslie Bricusse and Anthony Newley and a book by Bricusse and Timothy Allen McDonald. It is based on the 1964 novel Charlie and the Chocolate Factory by Roald Dahl. The musical was commissioned by Music Theatre International and is licensed for performance by amateur theatre groups.

== Development ==
After getting approval from the Dahl estate, McDonald and Bricusse worked together on the musical. McDonald said, "Our challenge was to create a live theatrical musical event that satisfied your expectations of the book and the film – but hopefully gave you another experience also." They used music that Bricusse and his former musical collaborator Newley, who had died in 1999, had created for the 1971 movie, and Bricusse also wrote new songs with a "retro-sounding" style that matched the earlier music.

== Plot ==
=== Act One ===
Willy Wonka introduces himself to the audience and summons his Oompa-Loompa workers, announcing that he is retiring and he must choose a new successor when he does ("Pure Imagination" / "The Golden Age of Chocolate"). Wonka, acting as narrator, introduces the impoverished Bucket family: Mr. and Mrs. Bucket, their young son Charlie, and Charlie's four bedridden grandparents, Grandpa George, Grandma Georgina, Grandpa Joe, and Grandma Josephine. Grandpa Joe assures Charlie that he is destined to work for Wonka making candy, just like he did when he was younger. However, Wonka fired all his workers years ago after one of his candy recipes had been stolen and sold to his competitors and locked the gates of his factory forever. Mysteriously, however, the factory has continued to produce candy. However, nobody ever goes in and nobody ever comes out.

A group of children gather outside Charlie's house, each clutching a nickel to buy a Wonka bar from the candy shop ("The Candy Man"). Charlie is the only child too poor to buy any candy, but the candy shop owner treats him to a lollipop and a copy of yesterday's newspaper. Charlie takes the paper home, and the Buckets learn from it that Wonka has announced a contest where five lucky children will go on a tour of his factory and get a lifetime supply of chocolate at the end if they find one of five Golden Tickets hidden in Wonka Bars.

The first ticket is found in Frankfurt, Germany by Augustus Gloop, an obese, gluttonous German boy ("I Eat More!"). The second ticket is found in São Paulo, Brazil, by an extremely spoiled girl named Veruca Salt. Her wealthy father, a macadamia nut magnate, had purchased hundreds of thousands of the candy bars and put his entire factory workforce to work searching for the ticket. As the search continues, Mr. Bucket loses his job at the toothpaste factory. Charlie encourages him not to give up hope ("Think Positive"). On Charlie's birthday, his family gives him a Wonka Bar for a present. Everyone manages to suppress their disappointment when Charlie unwraps the bar and finds no Golden Ticket.

The third ticket is found in Snellville, Georgia, by Violet Beauregarde, an abrasive girl who is constantly chewing gum. The fourth ticket is found in Television City, California, by Mike Teavee, a boy who seems more interested in television, video games, and cell phones than touring Wonka's factory ("I See it All on TV"). That night, before Charlie goes to bed, Grandpa Joe reveals that he has secretly purchased another Wonka Bar for Charlie. They open the bar together, but it contains only chocolate. The Buckets tell Charlie not to be discouraged ("Cheer Up, Charlie").

As winter approaches, the Buckets' situation is becoming increasingly desperate. Charlie is helping the candy shop owner pack his wares when he finds a silver dollar on the ground. He assumes that it must belong to the shop owner and tries to return it, but the owner tells Charlie to bring it home to his family. He also gives Charlie a Wonka Bar as a reward for his honesty. Charlie buys another Wonka Bar to share with his family. He unwraps the bar and finds the last ticket. He runs home to his family and reads the ticket aloud, saying that the tour is tomorrow and he can only bring one family member with him to the factory. Charlie chooses Grandpa Joe to accompany him on the factory tour, prompting Joe to get out of the bed for the first time in years. ("(I've) Got a Golden Ticket").

=== Act Two ===
The five winners and their chaperones are gathered at the factory gates where Wonka makes a spectacular entrance ("Pure Imagination" (reprise)). Wonka greets each child (apart from Charlie, each one is insufferable in his or her own way). Wonka forces everyone to sign an elaborate and cryptic contract before beginning the tour. The tour finally begins, and Wonka describes a dizzying array of fabulous chambers and exotic rooms, each devoted to the creation of various sweets and treats ("In This Room Here").

Wonka leads the tour group through a chamber in which the walls and ceiling appear to be closing in around them, and they appear in the Chocolate Room. Wonka introduces his workers, the Oompa-Loompas. Augustus sneezes into the chocolate river and is sucked into a large pipe. Wonka, with little apparent concern, directs the Oompa-Loompas to take Mrs. Gloop to the Strawberry-Dipping Room and retrieve Augustus. The Oompa-Loompas share a moral message about the dangers of gluttony ("Oompa-Loompa One").

Wonka and the remaining guests board a pink candy boat. Veruca Salt demands that her father buy her both the boat and one of the Oompa-Loompas. Salt attempts to buy them from Wonka, but Wonka is unimpressed. The boat ride then turns into a psychedelic nightmare as Wonka navigates them through what appears to be a tour of the darker aspects of human imagination, complete with frightening projected images ("There's No Knowing"). Wonka laughs maniacally and the others scream with horror until the boat abruptly vanishes and the party finds themselves in Wonka's Inventing Room.

In the Inventing Room, Wonka reveals one of his creations. A three-course meal in a piece of gum. Heedless of Wonka's half-hearted warnings that the gum is not yet perfected, Violet is unable to resist it ("Chew It") and blows up into a blueberry and is taken to the Juicing Room to be squeezed before she explodes. The Oompa-Loompas share a warning about the evils of excessive gum-chewing ("Oompa-Loompa Two").

Wonka and the remaining guests proceed to the Fizzy Lifting Drink Room, which is filled with bubbles. Wonka informs everyone that the drink will cause the imbiber to float, but forbids anyone to partake. Charlie and Grandpa Joe linger behind after the others leave, and the Oompa-Loompas tempt them to sample the drink. They do so, and immediately rise into the air ("Flying"). They soon find that they're in danger of being sucked into a giant fan on the roof of the room. However, they discover that burping reverses the effects of the drink, and, via a series of belches, they are able to descend back to the ground ("Burping Song").

Charlie and Grandpa Joe rejoin the others in the Nut Room, where a team of squirrels is busy sorting good nuts from bad nuts. Veruca immediately demands a squirrel, and launches into an extended spoiled tantrum ("I Want it Now"). She is deemed a "Bad Nut" and falls down one of the sorting shoots, pursued immediately by her father. The Oompa-Loompas share a moral about the ills of spoiling children ("Oompa-Loompa Three"). Wonka and the dwindling group proceed to the Choco-Vision Room where he is currently developing an experimental process for transmitting chocolate via television. He explains how to activate the experimental machinery but warns everyone not to do so. Mike immediately activates the equipment and transports himself via television signal. This results in his being shrunk to tiny size. Wonka directs that he be taken to the taffy-pulling machine and stretched out. The Oompa-Loompas warn of the perils of excessive television viewing ("Oompa-Loompa Four").

With only Charlie and Grandpa Joe remaining, Wonka abruptly announces that the tour is over. He pronounces that the day has been "a total waste of time and chocolate." Before going, Charlie confesses that he and Grandpa Joe tasted the Fizzy-Lifting Drinks, and states that he therefore does not deserve the lifetime supply of chocolate he was promised. He apologizes to Wonka and thanks him for the tour. Wonka stops Charlie from leaving and announces that the entire competition was devised with the goal of finding his successor, and that Charlie's behavior and performance prove that he should take over the factory. Wonka then takes them for a ride in the Great Glass Elevator ("Flying", reprise).

Augustus, Violet, Veruca and Mike appear, restored to their former selves, and join the Oompa-Loompas in praising the virtue of honesty ("Oompa-Loompa Five"). Wonka informs Charlie that his entire family is welcome to come and live at the factory. Charlie is delighted to take on his new role as Wonka's handpicked successor ("Finale").

== Musical numbers ==
Act I

- "Overture" - Orchestra
- "Pure Imagination" - Wonka † ‡‡
- "The Golden Age of Chocolate" - Wonka, Oompa-Loompas, and Ensemble
- "The Candy Man" - The Candy Man, Matilda, James, Charlie, and Ensemble †
- "I Eat More" - Augustus, Mrs. Gloop, Phineous Trout, and Ensemble ‡
- "Think Positive" - Charlie and Mr. Bucket ‡
- "I See it All on TV" - Mike and Mrs. Teavee ‡
- "Cheer Up, Charlie" - Grandpa Joe, Mr Bucket, Mrs Bucket and Family † ‡‡
- "Think Positive" (reprise) - Charlie ‡
- "(I've) Got a Golden Ticket" - Charlie, Grandpa Joe, Family, Wonka, Ticket Winners, and Ensemble †

Act II

- "Pure Imagination" (reprise) - Wonka
- "In This Room Here" - Wonka, Children, and Parents ‡
- "Oompa-Loompa 1"- Augustus and Oompa-Loompas †
- "There's No Knowing" - Wonka and Parents † ‡‡
- "Chew It" - Violet, Wonka, and Children ‡
- "Oompa-Loompa 2" - Violet and Oompa-Loompas †
- "Flying" - Charlie and Grandpa Joe ‡
- "Burping Song"- Charlie and Grandpa Joe
- "I Want It Now" - Veruca †
- "Oompa-Loompa 3" - Veruca and Oompa-Loompas †
- "Oompa-Loompa 4" - Mike and Oompa-Loompas †
- "Flying" (reprise)- Wonka, Grandpa Joe, and Charlie ‡
- "Oompa-Loompa 5"- Children and Oompa-Loompas
- Finale: "The Candy Man" - Wonka, Charlie, Grandpa Joe, and Company
- "Bows" - Orchestra ‡‡

† Featured in the 1971 film
‡‡ Removed for the KIDS version
Note
in the "Junior" version, "Pure Imagination (Reprise)" is replaced by "At The Gates".

== Alternate versions ==
As with many MTI licensed shows, shortened versions of the show are available to license for performing with or for younger age groups.

The "Theatre for Young Audiences" version is a one-act version intended for a smaller cast of adults to perform for younger audiences. It was made at the request of the Kennedy Center and premiered there in 2004. It has been described as a shorter, "bite-sized" version of the story.

The "Junior" version is also one act and runs approximately 60 minutes in performance. It was made with a different set of assumptions about the cast and resources directors would have at their disposal compared to the young audience version. Since school productions might use entire classes but have few financial resources, the "Junior" version was created for the needs of "an ever expandable and scalable show" that might have a budget that is "the equivalent of what a Broadway show would spend on the lead actor's shoes". The "Kids" version is similar to the Junior version, but is only 30 minutes long, and aimed at very young performers.
