= Timothy Scott (actor, born 1955) =

American actor and dancer (1955–1988)

Timothy Scott Schnell (September 15, 1955 – February 24, 1988), often credited as Timothy Scott, was an American Broadway actor and dancer. He was born in Morton Grove, Illinois, to parents Richard and Rosemary. He died of AIDS-related complications in Los Angeles at age 32.

He portrayed Mr. Mistoffelees in the original 1982 Broadway production of the musical, Cats "for about 18 months." He appeared in both the Broadway stage and the film versions of A Chorus Line. He also appeared in other theatre works, including Dancin' and King of Hearts. Other film and television productions included Baryshnikov in Hollywood, Captain EO, the 1980 Academy Awards and commercials.

Scott lived with his partner, film editor Norman Buckley.
