= I'm Just a Bill =

- Schoolhouse Rock! episode
- An anthropomorphic bill sings of his efforts to become a law to a young child.
- Episode no.: Season 3 Episode 5
- Directed by: Tom Yohe (design), Phil Kimmelman & Associates (animation)
- Written by: Dave Frishberg
- Narrated by: Jack Sheldon (singer)
- Original air date: March 27, 1976
- Running time: 3:16

Episode chronology
← Previous "Sufferin' Till Suffrage"	Next → "The Great American Melting Pot"

"I'm Just a Bill" is a 1976 Schoolhouse Rock! segment, featuring a song of the same title written by Dave Frishberg and performed by Jack Sheldon. The segment debuted as part of "America Rock", the third season of the Schoolhouse Rock! series.

First aired on March 27, 1976 on the US television network ABC, the segment covers the steps on how a bill in the United States Congress becomes a law through song. The song was voted as second best on the Schoolhouse Rock! Special 30th Anniversary Edition. TV Guide named the anthropomorphic character "Bill" as the 34th greatest cartoon character of all time.

== Overview ==
The song is sung by Jack Sheldon (the voice of the Bill), with dialogue by Sheldon's son John as the boy learning the process. It is about how a bill becomes a law by passing through both houses of Congress, and how it can be vetoed.

The bill proposed is for the law that school buses must stop at railroad crossings, likely a reference to the Gilchrest Road, New York crossing accident. In the song, the Bill becomes a law; in reality, such a bill has never been approved by the United States Congress, and indeed, such a bill would be of debatable constitutionality. An equivalent regulation, however, was codified by the United States Department of Transportation at 49 CFR 392.10.

== In popular culture ==
=== 1970s ===
At the end of another Schoolhouse Rock! song, "Tyrannosaurus Debt" (Money Rock), the Bill runs off after the tour guide saying, "Feeding time is ALL the time!" This made Bill one of the only characters to appear on more than one of the main Schoolhouse Rock! cartoons. (Mr. Morton and Interplanet Janet appeared in two direct-to-video episodes.)

=== 1980s ===
A Season 1 episode of the Knight Rider TV series, in which a senator requires protection after attempts on her life, is entitled Just My Bill.

=== 1990s ===
The hip hop group Groove B. Chill sang the tune with new lyrics: "We're Groove B. Chill/and we're sitting here on top of the hill" in its song "Top of the Hill", from the group's 1990 album Starting from Zero.

In one of the commercials made by the now-defunct retail store Mervyn's as part of its renowned "Open, Open, Open" campaign, a woman and the Bill are waiting outside at one of the store's locations. An employee walks to the front to open the automatic door, but opens a smaller version of it for the Bill to enter, much to the woman's chagrin. At the close of this commercial, the woman wakes up as if it is a dream, while her child watches the "I'm Just a Bill" video on the TV screen.

The song was covered by The Folk Implosion as "Deluxx Folk Implosion" for Schoolhouse Rock! Rocks in 1996.

The sketch was parodied in The Simpsons episode "The Day the Violence Died" (1996), in which Krusty the Clown presents "I'm an Amendment to Be", also performed by Jack Sheldon, depicting a Constitutional amendment's attempt to ban flag burning. The sketch was later briefly parodied in another Fox produced animated series, Family Guy. In the episode, "Mr. Griffin Goes to Washington" (2001), an anthropomorphic legal bill sings on the steps of the U.S. Capitol Building until he is stabbed and stuffed into a garbage bag by a sanitation engineer. Jack Sheldon provided the voice of the amendment in both parodies.

The video is referenced in the animated comedy series Johnny Bravo. In the episode, "Red Faced in the White House" (1997), when Johnny walks past the United States Capitol, he sees Bill sitting on the steps, just like in the Schoolhouse Rock! segment. In this case, however, it is announced that the Bill will not be made into law and a man comes out and destroys the Bill with a flamethrower. Dee Bradley Baker provided the voice of the Bill.

=== 2000s ===
The song was featured prominently in the Disney made-for-TV movie Mail to the Chief (2000) starring Randy Quaid.

A few lines from Deluxx Folk Implosion's cover of the song can be heard in the 2003 movie Legally Blonde 2: Red, White & Blonde, and is included in the film's official soundtrack.

The Board of Education character from the Drawn Together episode "Foxy vs. the Board of Education" is a parody of the Bill.

In the February 12, 2006, episode of Inside the Actors Studio, when James Lipton asked Dave Chappelle what he wanted to hear when he arrived in heaven, Chappelle answered, "Congratulations, Bill, you're a law."

In the January 16, 2011, issue of the comic strip Prickly City, Winslow, who is a long-time fan, discovers that the Bill (in this case an oversized piece of legislation) likes to smoke and drink, and proceeds to tell Winslow that if he wants to get an autograph that he'll need to pay $100 and has to be bribed with laundering money through political action committees. When Winslow reminds him of what the Bill represents in the song, the Bill responds, "I'm just a Bill! A thirsty Bill. Who's a guy gotta bribe to get a drink freshened up around here?"

=== 2010s ===
The song was parodied in the Mad segment "GleeVR", in which Garfield sings "I'm Just a Cat", which sounds similar to the song.

The Bill appears in the Robot Chicken episode "Robot Fight Accident" (2013), with a few other Schoolhouse Rock! characters (voiced by Seth Green).

The sketch was parodied in the opening sketch of Saturday Night Live on November 22, 2014, called "How a Bill Does Not Become a Law". The Bill, played by Kenan Thompson, is an immigration bill singing a slightly altered version of the song to the boy (Kyle Mooney). However, President Barack Obama (Jay Pharoah) pushes the bill down the Capitol Hill steps several times while explaining to the boy that it is far easier to utilize an executive order (Bobby Moynihan), as a critique on Obama's frequent usage of executive orders during his term. The executive order introduces itself by singing: "I'm an executive order, and I pretty much just happen."

Stephen Colbert parodied the opening of the song in a segment on The Late Show on March 27, 2017, in response to the withdrawal of the American Healthcare Act in the US House of Representatives the prior week.

The May 16, 2017, episode of Jimmy Kimmel Live! featured an animated parody of the segment, titled "I'm Just a Lie", satirizing the Trump administration's use of "alternative facts".

The fourth season premiere of Black-ish, ("Juneteenth"), which aired on October 3, 2017, included an animated parody titled "I'm Just a Slave", with the music performed by Aloe Blacc and The Roots.

In January 2018, the character Bill was used in an editorial cartoon by syndicated cartoonist Greg Kearney dealing with the issue of the Kansas state legislature's use of anonymous introduction of legislation.

In October 2019, Homsar, a character in Homestar Runner, dressed up as the Bill in the series' annual Halloween special.

=== 2020s ===
In the Animaniacs 2020 reboot, Dot Warner throws the Bill into a printing press while singing about the First Ladies, in this case Rosalynn Carter and Florence Harding.

In March 2021, Southern Ohio Medical Center parodied the song titled "Just a Vaccine", which traces the path of a vaccine from development to distribution. It highlights the extensive testing undergone by COVID vaccines to make sure they're safe and effective, as well as explaining how vaccines work.

In 2023, Funko released three Pop! Vinyl figurines of the Bill, Schoolhouse Rocky, and the Conductor from "Conjunction Junction" to coincide with the 50th anniversary of the ABC TV series Schoolhouse Rock! with a limited edition chase variant of the Bill as a law.

In May 2025, on The Late Show with Stephen Colbert (May 21, 2025), Colbert aired a parody of Schoolhouse Rock! called "Trump's Big Beautiful Bill Song". It featured a singing "Bill" on the Capitol steps with a boy, satirizing Trump's tax cuts and their impact on Medicare. The sketch turned darkly comedic, ending with the boy angrily rejecting Bill and setting him on fire.

In October 2025, an AI-generated parody of the song was created as part of Andrew Cuomo's 2025 mayoral campaign that acted as part of a smear campaign against the Democratic nominee Zohran Mamdani (who ended up winning the election). In it, the bill meets Mamdani and becomes shocked upon Mamdani's supposed underqualification to be the Mayor of New York City. The ad was harshly criticized for not being made with consent or permission from either Mamdani or The Walt Disney Company, as well as artifacts such as the AI making the bill appear pregnant.

=== Home video ===
"I'm Just a Bill" of the series for VHS tapes were released in 1987 by Golden Book Video which featured Cloris Leachman, where America Rock was called History Rock. On August 8, 1995, Paramount Home Video re-released four segments of Schoolhouse Rock! on VHS with alternative covers and a 1995 "I'm Just a Bill" VHS for the show's 25th anniversary, Walt Disney Home Video, which became a sister company to ABC after their VHS featured Bill with Sarah from "Sufferin' 'til Suffrage".

On August 27, 2002, Walt Disney Home Entertainment released a two-DVD set to coincide with the 30th anniversary of the show. The set features 52 of the 53 episodes that had been produced up to that point, featuring Bill with the Conductor from "Conjunction Junction" on the cover. In 2008, DVDs of the individual Schoolhouse Rock! series were released for classrooms of the "I'm Just a Bill" disc and Bill appears on the cover.

On June 5, 2020, a majority of the shorts were made available for streaming on Disney+ now ABC season 3 episode 5 "I'm Just a Bill".

== 2007 reference to the segment in the United States Senate ==
Criticizing a comprehensive immigration reform bill, Sen. Jeff Sessions (R-AL) critiqued the proposed legislation for three hours on May 21, 2007, in front of "a giant picture of a famous scene from Schoolhouse Rock's 'I'm just a bill' skit". The caption on the picture was "How a Senate Bill Becomes a Law". Sessions pointed out how the reform bill had proceeded through the Senate in contrast with what educational material like the cartoon had laid out, saying,

[Professor Hugh Hewitt has written that this is] not what we were taught in grade school, I assure you, and I couldn't agree more. This is not how the process is supposed to work. We should not be asked to trust our colleagues and vote to put a bill on the floor when we do not know that the bill text is even finalized, that the bill has not been drafted by legislative counsel, the bill has not been introduced or even given a bill number, the committee process was skipped and not followed, a Congressional Budget Office score may not have been requested.
