= Conjunction Junction =

- Schoolhouse Rock! episode
- Episode no.: Season 2 Episode 3
- Written by: Bob Dorough
- Original air date: November 17, 1973
- Running time: 4:13

Episode chronology
← Previous "Verb: That's What's Happening"	Next → "Interjections!"

"Conjunction Junction" is a song written by Bob Dorough as part of the Schoolhouse Rock! series of educational songs and videos. It aired on November 17, 1973, with vocals from the celebrated jazz artist Jack Sheldon, who also appears in I'm Just a Bill. It is "by far the most recognized Schoolhouse Rock tune" according to Bob Newall and Yohe.

The frequent refrain of the song is "Conjunction Junction, what's your function? Hookin' up words and phrases and clauses." Conjunction Junction was one of seven Grammar Rock episodes, which made up the second season of Schoolhouse Rock!. To teach conjunctions and their purpose of joining clauses with and, but, or, and nor, the song uses the metaphor of a railroad junction connecting freight cars.

== Episode ==
The main character is an unnamed train conductor with wire-framed glasses, blue overalls and a red bandana. He connects boxcars representing words, phrases, and clauses with the conjunction boxcars that read "AND", "BUT", and "OR", while two hobos fry fish, ride in a hot air balloon, and drink tea with the conductor. Also featured are the duck and the drake, a woman tied up onto the railroad tracks. At the very end, the conductor waves from the caboose.

The idea of a railyard where words and phrases get hooked together came from George Newall. Tom Yohe created the storyboard and sketched the conductor, while Bill Peckmann added several side characters.

"The whole idea is: What are you up to? What's your function? What are you seeking?"
– Bob Dorough, Conjunction Junction songwriter

== Production ==
Conjunction Junction was Jack Sheldon's Schoolhouse Rock! singing debut, and he went on to provide vocals for the classic, I'm Just a Bill, as well Sheldon was the well known television sidekick of Merv Griffin and a celebrated trumpet player. Sheldon played trumpet on the track, and credited the success of Schoolhouse Rock! to its deep roots in jazz: "When we made Conjunction Junction, it was me and Teddy Edwards and Nick Ceroli and Leroy Vinegar and Bob Dorough played the piano. That’s a jazz band…it was really nothing to do with rock. It was always jazz, but we said rock and roll, so everybody loved it for rock and roll." The group of celebrated jazz performers, which also included Dave Frishberg on piano and Stuard Scharf on guitar, recorded Conjunction Junction and I'm Just a Bill (which was released two years later) in Los Angeles on the same day. Bob Dorough asked Terry Morel, a jazz singer who was in town, to sing the chorus on the demo tape with Mary Sue Berry on harmony, and the recording ended up being the final cut.

== Legacy ==
Schoolhouse Rock! creators George Newall and Tom Yohe wrote more than twenty years after the song's release that "you can sit at your restaurant table, look up at your twenty- or thirty-something waiter or waitress, say "Conjunction Junction," and chances are you'll get the same enthusiastic reply every time: 'What's your function?'"

In live performances by songwriter Bob Dorough, Conjunction Junction was the crowd favorite along with I'm Just a Bill and The Preamble.

An undergraduate English student at the University of Connecticut organized a petition in 1991 to bring back Schoolhouse Rock!, which taught her conjunctions.

A parody of it called ‘Norfolk Southern! What’s your Function?’ is a parody of the song, for Class 1 railroad Norfolk Southern.

Conjunction Junction appeared in the 1994 film Reality Bites with Ben Stiller. In 2010, Conjunction Junction became the hold music for the United States Department of Education, replacing previous elevator music that the Deputy Chief of Staff Matthew Yale described as "awful, awful, just awful".

=== Better Than Ezra cover ===
On the 1990s-released album Schoolhouse Rock! Rocks, the song is covered by Better Than Ezra.

== See also ==
- Three Is a Magic Number
- I'm Just a Bill
