= Dare to Dream Jr. =

2025 musical revue

- The logo of the musical
- Music: Kristen Anderson-Lopez; Howard Ashman; Frank Churchill; Phil Collins; Mack David; Mikkel Eriksen; Sia Furler; Terry Gilkyson; Leigh Harline; Tor Hermansen; Al Hoffman; Elton John; Philip Lawrence; Jerry Livingston; Robert Lopez; Alan Menken; Lin-Manuel Miranda; Larry Morey; Davy Nathan; Randy Newman; Tim Rice; Stephen Schwartz; Richard M. Sherman; Robert B. Sherman; Glenn Slater; Ned Washington; David Zippel; Source:
- Book: Patrick Sulken
- Basis: Various

Dare to Dream Jr. is a 2025 musical revue published by Disney. The show includes 20, primarily Disney, songs from over 100 years.

== Creation ==
The music in Dare to Dream Jr. was arranged by Patrick Sulken and Britt Bonney. The revue's songs are mostly from Disney movies and musicals, but songs from Pinnochio and Snow White are licensed from Bourne Co. Dare to Dream Jr. was written to commemorate Disney's centennial. The show was written specifically for "today's young performers".

There is one act in the musical and no intermission. The show is written to last 60 minutes. There are no gendered pronouns in the show, and all characters are gender-flexible.

== Characters ==
There are no named characters in the show; instead, there are 15 numbered "players". There are two trainers leading the group, Players 1 and 2.

The trainees in Dare to Dream Jr. are referred to as "Junior Imagineers" or "Imagineers-in-Training", a nod to Disney's Imagineers.

== Plot ==
A group of Junior Imagineers arrive at Disney's Imagineering Studios for their training. The trainees are taught about the importance of dreams. Player 3 does not have a dream, and several other students try to help her. But, Player 5 can't wait for their dream to come true. The two trainers, emotional, dismiss the Junior Imagineers for a break.

The other trainees remain encouraging towards Player 3. The mentors return to find all the other students helping Player 3 find her dream. Player 11 sings about having multiple dreams, and pursuing them all intermittently. Then, Player 3 realizes that she doesn't have to commit to one dream in particular. In response to this, Player 5 is relieved that not all of their dreams have to come true immediately. Player 14 encourages fun and silliness in their song. Player 15 then sings about how dreams are often shared.

The Junior Imagineers have only one day of training; this is both their first and last. The new Imagineers reflect on the power of dreams for unity and morality.

== Musical numbers ==
There are 20 songs in the revue and 22 tracks:

Track number	Song title	Characters
01	Overture	-
02	A Dream is a Wish Your Heart Makes	Various
03	Be Our Guest	1, 2, ensemble
04	When You Wish Upon a Star/A Dream is a Wish (Reprise)	Various
05	How Far I'll Go/Part of Your World	6, 7, ensemble
06	Just Around the Riverbend/Out There	6, 7, 11, 12, 13
07	I Just Can't Wait to Be King	5, ensemble
08	Surface Pressure	3, various
09	Let It Go	10, ensemble
10	Friend Like Me	8, ensemble
11	You've Got a Friend in Me	8, 9, ensemble
12	Dig a Little Deeper	4, 10, 14, 15
13	Try Everything	11, ensemble
14	Go the Distance	3
15	When I Am Older	5
16	Hakuna Matata/The Bare Necessities	1, 2, ensemble
17	Nonsense Medley (Note: The component songs of the medley are, in order of appearance: Trashin' the Camp, Heigh-Ho, Bibbidi-Bobbidi-Boo, Higitus Figitus, Heffalumps and Woozles, and Supercalifragilisticexpialidocious.)	14, (4), ensemble
18	Remember Me	15, ensemble
19	I've Got a Dream	Various
20	Finale	Ensemble
21	Bows (You Are The Magic)	Ensemble
22	Exit music	-
