= André Previn discography =

André Previn (1929–2019) was a German-American pianist, conductor, and composer. Previn won four Academy Awards for his film work and ten Grammy Awards for his recordings (and one more for his Lifetime Achievement).

== Recordings ==
Previn's discography contains hundreds of recordings in film, jazz, classical music and contemporary classical music. Because of the huge number of recordings, the following lists are necessarily highly selective. A full discography (including LP/CD record codes) is available in Frédéric Döhl: André Previn. Musikalische Vielseitigkeit und ästhetische Erfahrung, Stuttgart 2012, pp. 295–319.

=== Film music ===
Most of the films which incorporate Previn's music are still available as videos/DVDs and/or as soundtrack records. Some of his soundtracks have been reissued in recent years, including those from Elmer Gantry, Four Horsemen of the Apocalypse, Inside Daisy Clover, and Dead Ringer.

=== Jazz recordings ===
Previn made dozens of jazz recordings as both a leader and sideman, primarily during two periods of his career: from 1945 to 1967, and then again from 1989 to 2001, with just a handful of recordings in between and afterward (while he focused his career on conducting/recording classical music, and later on composing contemporary art music). Previn also did several crossover recordings with classical singers like Eileen Farrell, Leontyne Price or Kiri Te Kanawa, too, as well as several Easy-Listening records with piano and orchestra in the 1960s (beginning with Like Young. Secret Songs for Young Lovers, 1959. with David Rose and His Orchestra).

Like Oscar Peterson, whom Previn admired a great deal, and Bill Evans, Previn worked a lot as a trio pianist (usually with bass and drums). Following his performance on Shelly Manne's recording Modern Jazz Performances of Songs from My Fair Lady in 1956, Previn released several albums of jazz interpretations of songs from broadway musicals as well as several solo piano recordings focussed on the songbooks of popular composers (André Previn Plays Songs by Vernon Duke, 1958; André Previn Plays Songs by Harold Arlen, 1960; Ballads. Solo Jazz Standards, 1996; Alone: Ballads for Solo Piano, 2007), the late recording of songs by Harold Arlen with singer Sylvia McNair and bass player David Finck (Come Rain or Shine. The Harold Arlen Songbook, 1996), and his TV shows with Oscar Peterson (1974) – which Marlon Brando simply called "one of the greatest hours I ever saw on television" – and Ella Fitzgerald (1979) respectively.

Jazz critic and historian Ted Gioia wrote in his book about West Coast jazz, the scene to which Previn belonged:

[His] projects varied greatly in terms of quality and jazz content, but at his best Previn could be a persuasive, moving jazz musician. [...] Despite his deep roots in symphonic music, Previn largely steered clear of Third Stream classicism in his jazz work, aiming more at an earthy, hard-swinging piano style at times reminiscent of Horace Silver. Long before his eventual retreat from his jazz work, Previn had become something of a popularizer of jazz rather than a serious practitioner of the music. At his best, however, his music reflected a strong indigenous feel for the jazz idiom.

Dizzy Gillespie stated,

He has the flow, you know, which a lot of guys don't have and won't ever get. Yeah. I heard him play and I knew. A lot of guys, they have the technique, the harmonic sense. They've got the perfect coordination. And, yeah, all that's necessary. But you need something more, you know? Even if you only make an oooooooo, like that, you got to have the flow.

==== Jazz recordings as leader/co-leader ====
- André Previn Plays Harry Warren (RCA Victor, 1952)
- Collaboration (RCA Victor, 1955) – with Shorty Rogers
- Let's Get Away from It All (Decca, 1955)
- Double Play! (Contemporary, 1957) with Russ Freeman
- André Previn Plays Fats Waller (Tops/Zenith, 1957)
- Pal Joey (Contemporary, 1957)
- Gigi (Contemporary, 1958)
- André Previn Plays Songs by Vernon Duke (Contemporary, 1958)
- Secret Songs For Young Lovers (MGM Records, 1958, with David Rose)
- King Size! (Contemporary, 1959)
- André Previn Plays Songs by Jerome Kern (Contemporary, 1959)
- West Side Story (Contemporary, 1959)
- Like Blue (MGM Records, 1960)
- The Subterraneans (Soundtrack) (MGM, 1960)
- Like Previn! (Contemporary, 1960)
- André Previn Plays Songs by Harold Arlen (Contemporary, 1960)
- A Touch of Elegance (Columbia, 1960)
- Music from Camelot (Columbia, 1960)
- Give My Regards to Broadway (Columbia 1960)
- Like Love (Columbia, 1960)
- Thinking of You (Columbia, 1961)
- The Previn Scene (MGM Records, 1961)
- Duet (Columbia, 1962, with Doris Day)
- André Previn and J. J. Johnson Play Kurt Weill's Mack The Knife & Bilbao-Song (Columbia, 1962, with J.J. Johnson)
- The Light Fantastic: A Tribute To Fred Astaire (Columbia, 1962)
- 4 to Go! (Columbia, 1963) with Herb Ellis, Ray Brown and Shelly Manne
- But Beautiful (Decca, 1963)
- Soft and Swinging the Music of Jimmy McHugh (Columbia, 1964)
- Sound Stage! (Columbia, 1964)
- Love Walked In (RCA Camden, 1964)
- The Popular Previn (Columbia, 1965)
- André Previn Plays Music of the Young Hollywood Composers (RCA Victor, 1965)
- Previn with Voices (RCA Victor, 1966)
- All Alone (RCA Victor, 1967)
- Right As the Rain (RCA Victor, 1967, with Leontyne Price)
- The Easy Winners (Angel Records, 1975, with Itzhak Perlman)
- A Different Kind of Blues (EMI/Angel, 1980, with Itzhak Perlman)
- It's a Breeze (EMI/Angel, 1981, with Itzhak Perlman)
- Nice Work if You Can Get It (1983, with Ella Fitzgerald and Niels-Henning Ørsted Pedersen)
- After Hours (Telarc, 1989, with Joe Pass and Ray Brown)
- Uptown (Telarc, 1990, with Mundell Lowe and Ray Brown)
- Old Friends (Telarc, 1992, with Mundell Lowe and Ray Brown)
- Kiri Sidetracks: The Jazz Album (1992, with Kiri Te Kanawa, Mundell Lowe and Ray Brown)
- What Headphones? (Angel, 1993)
- Sure Thing: The Jerome Kern Songbook (1994, with Sylvia McNair and David Finck)
- André Previn and Friends Play Show Boat (Deutsche Grammophon, 1995, with Mundell Lowe, Ray Brown and Grady Tate)
- Ballads: Solo Jazz Standards (Angel, 1996)
- Come Rain or Shine: The Harold Arlen Songbook (1996, with Sylvia McNair and David Finck)
- Jazz at the Musikverein (Verve, 1997, with Mundell Lowe and Ray Brown)
- We Got Rhythm: A Gershwin Songbook (Deutsche Grammophon, 1998, with David Finck)
- We Got It Good and That Ain't Bad: An Ellington Songbook (Deutsche Grammophon, 1999, with David Finck)
- Live at the Jazz Standard (Decca, 2001, with David Finck)
- Alone: Ballads for Solo Piano (Decca, 2007)

==== Jazz recordings as sideman/group member ====
With Buddy Bregman

- Swinging Kicks (Verve, 1957)

With Benny Carter

- Jazz Giant (Contemporary, 1958)

With Michael Feinstein

- Change of Heart: The Songs of Andre Previn (Telarc, 2013)

With Helen Humes

- Tain't Nobody's Biz-ness if I Do (Contemporary, 1959)
- Songs I Like to Sing! (Contemporary, 1960)

With Barney Kessel

- Music to Listen to Barney Kessel By (Contemporary, 1956)
- Carmen (Contemporary, 1959)

With Shelly Manne

- Shelly Manne & His Friends (Contemporary, 1956)
- My Fair Lady (Contemporary, 1956)
- Li'l Abner (Contemporary, 1957)
- Bells Are Ringing (Contemporary, 1959)

With The Mitchells: Red Mitchell, Whitey Mitchell and Blue Mitchell

- Get Those Elephants Out'a Here (MetroJazz, 1958)

With Lyle Murphy

- 12-Tone Compositions and Arrangements by Lyle Murphy (Contemporary, 1955)

With Pete Rugolo

- An Adventure in Sound: Reeds in Hi-Fi (Mercury, 1956 [1958])
- An Adventure in Sound: Brass in Hi-Fi (Mercury 1956 [1958])
- Percussion at Work (EmArcy, 1957)

=== Classical music (as conductor or pianist – selection) ===
==== Chamber music / solo piano music ====
As in Jazz, Previn, the classical pianist, worked most of the time as a trio pianist (with violin and cello) in classical chamber music. Accordingly, most of his recordings as pianist are in this genre.

- Samuel Barber: Four Excursions, Paul Hindemith: Piano Sonata No. 3, Frank Martin: Prelude No. 7 (1961)
- Gabriel Fauré: Piano Trio in D minor op. 120, Felix Mendelssohn: Piano Trio in D minor op. 49 (1964, with Nathan Roth and Joseph Schuster)
- Sergei Rachmaninoff: Music for Two Pianos. Suite Nr. 1 op. 5, Suite Nr. 2 op. 17, Symphonic Dances op. 45 (1974, with Vladimir Ashkenazy)
- Maurice Ravel: Piano Trio in A minor, Dmitri Shostakovich: Piano Trio No. 2 in E minor op. 67 (1974, with Kim Young Uck and Ralph Kirshbaum)
- Claude Debussy: Piano Trio in G major, Maurice Ravel: Piano Trio in A minor (1995, with Julie Rosenfeld and Gary Hoffmann)
- 'Ludwig van Beethoven: Piano Trio No. 7 in B-flat major op. 97, Johannes Brahms: Piano Trio in B major op. 8 (1995, with Viktoria Mullova and Heinrich Schiff)
- American Scenes. André Previn: Sonata for Violin and Piano "Vineyard", George Gershwin: Three Preludes, Aaron Copland: Sonata for Violin and Piano, Nocturne, Samuel Barber: Canzone (Elegy) op. 38a (1998, with Gil Shaham)

==== Orchestral music / concertos / ballets ====
Previn's recording repertoire as a conductor is focused on the standards of classical and romantic music, excepting opera in general, favoring the symphonic music of Hector Berlioz, Johannes Brahms and Richard Strauss and with a special emphasis on violin and piano concertos and ballets. Just a few of Previn's recordings deal with music before Joseph Haydn and Wolfgang Amadeus Mozart (both favourites of Previn's programmes) or contemporary avant-garde art music based on atonality, minimalism, serialism, stochastic music etc. Instead, in 20th-century music Previn's repertoire highlights specific composers of late romanticism and modernism like Samuel Barber, Benjamin Britten, George Gershwin, Erich Wolfgang Korngold, Sergei Prokofiev, Sergei Rachmaninoff, Maurice Ravel, Dmitri Shostakovich, Richard Strauss, Ralph Vaughan Williams, Harold Shapero and William Walton.

Previn recorded mostly for EMI, Telarc and Deutsche Grammophon.

=== Contemporary classical music (recordings of Previn's own compositions – selection) ===
- Guitar Concerto (1972, with John Williams and the London Symphony Orchestra)
- Every Good Boy Deserves Favour (1978, with the London Symphony Orchestra)
- Piano Concerto and Guitar Concerto (1990, with Vladimir Ashkenazy, Eduardo Fernandez and the Royal Philharmonic Orchestra)
- Honey and Rue (1995, with Kathleen Battle and the Orchestra of St. Luke's)
- "From Ordinary Things": Sonata for Cello and Piano; Four Songs for Soprano, Cello and Piano; Two Remembrances for Soprano, Alto Flute and Piano; Vocalise for Soprano, Cello and Piano (1997, with Sylvia McNair, Yo-Yo Ma and Sandra Church)
- Trio for Piano, Oboe and Bassoon (1997, with Cynthia Koledo de Almeida and Nancy Goeres)
- "Music of André Previn": Trio for Piano, Oboe and Bassoon, Peaches for Flute and Piano, Triolet for Brass, Variations on a Theme by Haydn for Piano, A Wedding Waltz for Two Oboes and Piano (1998, with the St. Luke's Chamber Ensemble)
- "American Scenes": Sonata for Violin and Piano "Vineyard" (1998, with Gil Shaham)
- A Streetcar Named Desire (1998; with Renée Fleming, Elizabeth Futral, Rodney Gilfry, Anthony Dean Griffey, San Francisco Opera Orchestra)
- "Diversions – Songs": Diversions; Sallie Chisum Remembers Billy the Kid; Vocalise; The Giraffes Go to Hamburg; Three Dickinson Songs (2001, with Renée Fleming, Barbara Bonney, Moray Welsh, Vienna Philharmonic, London Symphony Orchestra)
- Tango Song and Dance (2003, Anne-Sophie Mutter)
- Violin Concerto "Anne-Sophie" (2003, with Anne-Sophie Mutter and the Boston Symphony Orchestra)
- Double Concerto for Violin, Contrabass and Orchestra; Piano Concerto; Violin Concerto "Anne-Sophie"; Three Dickinson Songs; Diversions; "I Can Smell The Sea Air" from A Streetcar Named Desire (2009, with Renée Fleming, Anne-Sophie Mutter, Vladimir Ashkenazy, Roman Patkolo, Boston Symphony Orchestra, London Symphony Orchestra, Vienna Philharmonic, San Francisco Opera Orchestra)
- Brief Encounter (2011, with Elizabeth Futral, Nathan Gunn, Kim Josephson, Houston Grand Opera Orchestra, Patrick Summers)
