= Frank Capp =

American jazz drummer (1931–2017)

- Born: Francis Cappuccio; August 20, 1931; Worcester, Massachusetts, U.S.
- Died: September 12, 2017 (aged 86) Studio City, California, U.S.
- Genres: Jazz, rock
- Occupation: Musician
- Instruments: Drums, percussion, vibraphone
- Formerly of: The Wrecking Crew

Francis Cappuccio (August 20, 1931 – September 12, 2017), known professionally as Frank Capp, was an American jazz drummer. Capp also played on numerous rock and roll sessions and is considered to be a member of the Wrecking Crew.

== Biography ==
Capp was born Francis Cappuccio in Worcester, Massachusetts, United States. He began playing with Stan Kenton in early 1952 and remained with Kenton until the end of that year. He then joined Neal Hefti's group. He often accompanied Peggy Lee on her road dates and subsequently went to Los Angeles where he joined Billy May, and recorded with The Wrecking Crew. He played with Ella Fitzgerald, Harry James, Charlie Barnet, Stan Getz, Art Pepper, and Dave Pell. He recorded often with André Previn's trio (1957–1964), and also made records with Benny Goodman (1958), Terry Gibbs, and Turk Murphy.

Capp worked steadily on television shows and in the film studios in the 1960s. He spent more than 13 years as drummer for the David Rose Orchestra on The Red Skelton Show. Starting in the 1970s, he recorded extensively in a variety of settings for Concord. Together with Nat Pierce he founded the Capp-Pierce Juggernaut big band in 1975.

In his later years, he resided with his partner Lori Singman in Studio City, California, and performed every Tuesday at Las Hadas Restaurant in Northridge, California, accompanied by his fellow jazz colleagues. In 2016, Capp wrote and published his autobiography Drumming Up Business: My Life in Music.

Frank Capp died in September 2017 in Studio City, at the age of 86.

== Selected discography ==
=== As leader ===
With Nat Pierce

- Frank Capp & Nat Pierce: Juggernaut (Concord Jazz, 1976)
- The Capp-Pierce Juggernaut: Live at the Century Plaza with Joe Williams (Concord Jazz, 1978)
- The Frank Capp-Nat Pierce Orchestra: Juggernaut Strikes Again! with Ernie Andrews (Concord Jazz, 1982)
- The Capp-Pierce Juggernaut: Live at the Alley Cat with Ernestine Anderson (Concord Jazz, 1987)

With The Frank Capp Juggernaut

- In a Hefti Bag (Concord Jazz, 1995)
- Play It Again Sam (Concord Jazz, 1997)

=== As sideman ===
With The Beach Boys

- The Beach Boys' Christmas Album (Capitol, 1964)
- Summer Days (And Summer Nights!!) (Capitol, 1965)
- Pet Sounds (Capitol, 1966)
- Sunflower (Capitol, 1970)
- Surf's Up (Capitol, 1971)
- Carl and the Passions – "So Tough" (Capitol, 1972)

With Beaver & Krause

- All Good Men (Warner Bros., 1972)

With Michael Bublé

- Michael Bublé (Reprise, 2003)
- It's Time (Reprise, 2005)

With Cher

- All I Really Want to Do (Imperial, 1965)
- Chér (Imperial, 1966)

With Stan Kenton

- City of Glass (Capitol, 1951)
- Popular Favorites by Stan Kenton (Capitol, 1953)
- This Modern World (Capitol, 1953)

With André Previn

- King Size! (Contemporary, 1959)
- Dinah Sings, Previn Plays with Dinah Shore (Capitol, 1959)
- Like Previn! (Contemporary, 1960)
- André Previn and J. J. Johnson with J. J. Johnson (Columbia, 1961)
- Duet with Doris Day (Columbia, 1962)

With The Ronettes

- Presenting the Fabulous Ronettes (Philles, 1964)

With Bud Shank

- Girl in Love (World Pacific, 1966)
- Bud Shank Plays Music from Today's Movies (World Pacific, 1967)

With Frank Sinatra

- That's Life (Reprise, 1966)
- The World We Knew (Reprise, 1967)

With Sonny & Cher

- Look at Us (Atco, 1965)
- In Case You're in Love (Atlantic, 1967)

With others

- Chet Baker, Albert's House (Beverly Hills, 1969)
- Glen Campbell, I Remember Hank Williams (Capitol, 1973)
- The Crystals, Twist Uptown (Philles, 1962)
- John Denver, Earth Songs (Windstar, 1990)
- Jackie DeShannon, Jackie DeShannon (Liberty, 1963)
- Dion DiMucci, Born to Be with You (Phil Spector, 1975)
- The Everly Brothers, The Everly Brothers Sing (Warner Bros., 1967)
- George Gerdes, Obituary (United Artists, 1971)
- Herbie Harper Quintet, Five Brothers (Tampa, 1955)
- Nancy Honeytree, Melodies In Me (Myrrh, 1978)
- Lena Horne, Lena...Lovely and Alive (RCA Victor, 1962)
- Jack Jones, What I Did For Love (RCA Victor, 1975)
- John Lennon, Rock 'n' Roll (Apple, 1975)
- The Mitchells: Red Mitchell, Whitey Mitchell, Blue Mitchell and André Previn, Get Those Elephants Out'a Here (MetroJazz, 1958)
- The Monkees, More of the Monkees (Colgems, 1967)
- The Monkees, The Birds, the Bees & the Monkees (Colgems, 1968)
- Walter Murphy, Walter Murphy's Discosymphony (New York, 1979)
- Michael Nesmith, The Wichita Train Whistle Sings (Dot, 1968)
- Jack Nitzsche, Heart Beat (Soundtrack) (Capitol, 1980)
- Anita O'Day, In a Mellow Tone (Kayo, 1989)
- Renee Olstead, Skylark (Reprise, 2009)
- Joe Pass, A Sign of the Times (World Pacific, 1965)
- The Righteous Brothers, Back to Back (Philles, 1965)
- Shorty Rogers, Shorty Rogers Meets Tarzan (MGM, 1960)
- Nancy Sinatra, Boots (Reprise, 1966)
- Keely Smith, Keely Sings Sinatra (Concord, 2001)
- Captain & Tennille, Song of Joy (A&M, 1976)
- Ike & Tina Turner, River Deep – Mountain High (A&M, 1966)
- Ben Webster, The Warm Moods (Reprise, 1961)
- Joe Williams, Prez & Joe: In Celebration of Lester Young (GNP, 1979)
