= Nobody Else but Me =

1946 Broadway musical song

"Nobody Else but Me", sometimes called "Nobody Else but You", is a song composed by Jerome Kern with lyrics by Oscar Hammerstein II for the 1946 Broadway revival of the musical Show Boat when it was introduced by Jan Clayton as the character Magnolia. This was the last song written by Kern, who died November 11, 1945. The Show Boat revival opened January 5, 1946.

== Vocal recordings ==
- 1946 Jan Clayton in the Show Boat cast album.
- 1957 Barbara Lea – for her album Barbara Lea With the Johnny Windhurst Quartet.
- 1961 Ruth Price – for her album Ruth Price with Shelly Manne & His Men at the Manne-Hole.
- 1963 Sarah Vaughan – for her album The Explosive Side of Sarah Vaughan.
- 1964 Tony Bennett – included in his album When Lights Are Low.
- 1994 Sylvia McNair and André Previn for their album Sure Thing: The Jerome Kern Songbook
- 1995 Mel Tormé – for the album Velvet & Brass.
- 2001 Kristin Chenoweth – for her album Let Yourself Go.
- 2015 Tony Bennett – for the album The Silver Lining: The Songs of Jerome Kern.

== Instrumental recordings ==
- 1960 Kenny Dorham - included on his album Showboat.
- 1964 Stan Getz – included on his album Nobody Else but Me, first released in 1994.
- 1967 Joe Pass – included on his album Simplicity.
- 1976 Bill Evans – recorded during sessions for his album Quintessence, and first released as a bonus track on compact disc reissues of the album.
- 1977 Bill Evans – recorded for his album I Will Say Goodbye, which was first released in 1980.
- 1978 Bill Evans – recorded for his album New Conversations, this was the last recorded studio version of the song by Evans, but the first to be released.
- 1984 Ed Bickert – recorded for his album Bye Bye Baby.
- 1997 Brad Mehldau – recorded for his album The Art of the Trio Volume One.
- 2018 Walter Smith III – recorded for his album Twio.
