= André Previn Plays Songs by Vernon Duke =

Studio album by André Previn
- Released: 1958; July 1, 1991 (CD issue)
- Recorded: August 12–13, 20, 30, 1958
- Studio: Contemporary's Studio, Los Angeles
- Genre: Jazz
- Length: 42:21
- Label: Contemporary, C 3558, S 7558
- Producer: Lester Koenig

André Previn chronology
Gigi (1958)	André Previn Plays Songs by Vernon Duke (1958)	King Size! (1958)

Professional ratings
Review scores
Source	Rating
The Penguin Guide to Jazz	3/4 stars

André Previn Plays Songs by Vernon Duke is a piano solo, jazz album by André Previn. It was recorded in August 1958. It was intended as a homage to jazz composer Vernon Duke. It was released in 1958 by Contemporary Records as C 3558. It was Previn's second album dedicated in its entirety to a single composer. After its release, other two tribute albums followed: André Previn Plays Songs by Jerome Kern (1959) and André Previn Plays Songs by Harold Arlen (1960).

== Track listing ==
All pieces composed by Vernon Duke.

1. "Cabin in the Sky" - 4:05
2. "Autumn in New York" - 3:53
3. " The Love I Long For" - 3:59
4. "Ages Ago" - 3:50
5. "Taking a Chance on Love" - 5:17
6. "What Is There to Say" - 3:58
7. "I Can't Get Started" - 5:26
8. "I Like the Likes of You" - 3:46
9. "Round About" - 4:38
10. "April in Paris" - 3:43

== Personnel ==
- André Previn - piano
- Phil De Lancie - digital remastering
