= Li'l Abner (disambiguation) =

Li'l Abner, a satirical American comic strip

Li'l Abner may also refer to:

- Li'l Abner (1940 film), a 1940 film based on the comic strip
- Li'l Abner (musical), a 1956 stage musical
- Li'l Abner (1959 film), a 1959 film based on the 1956 stage musical
- Li'l Abner (album), a 1957 jazz album by Shelly Manne and His Friends
