= J. J.'s Broadway =

Studio album by J. J. Johnson
- Released: 1963
- Recorded: March 12 and April 6, 1963; New York City
- Genre: Jazz
- Length: 37:23
- Label: Verve; V/V6 8530
- Producer: Jim Davis

J. J. Johnson chronology
André Previn and J. J. Johnson (1962)	J. J.'s Broadway (1963)	Proof Positive (1964)

J. J.'s Broadway is an album by jazz trombonist and arranger J. J. Johnson recorded in 1963 for the Verve label.

== Reception ==
Professional ratings
Review scores
Source	Rating
Allmusic	3/5 stars
The Penguin Guide to Jazz Recordings	3/4 stars

The Allmusic review by Scott Yanow observed "This album has some good music, but it will be very difficult to find".

== Track listing ==
1. "Lovely" (Stephen Sondheim) - 3:56
2. "My Favorite Things" (Richard Rodgers, Oscar Hammerstein II) - 4:17
3. "Mira" (Bob Merrill) - 3:23
4. "Make Someone Happy" (Jule Styne, Betty Comden, Adolph Green) - 3:51
5. "Who Will Buy?" (Lionel Bart) - 3:54
6. "A Sleepin' Bee" (Harold Arlen, Truman Capote) - 3:54
7. "Put on a Happy Face" (Lee Adams, Charles Strouse) - 4:06
8. "Nobody's Heart" (Richard Rodgers, Lorenz Hart) - 3:39
9. "A Second Chance" (André Previn) - 2:55
10. "The Sweetest Sounds" (Rodgers) - 3:28
- Recorded in New York City on March 12, 1963 (tracks 1, 3, 5, 6, 8 & 10) and April 6, 1963 (tracks 2, 4, 7 & 9)

== Personnel ==
- J. J. Johnson - trombone, leader
- Paul Faulise, Urbie Green, Lou McGarity, Tom Mitchell - trombone (tracks 1, 3, 5, 6, 8 & 10)
- Hank Jones - piano (tracks 2 & 4–8)
- Richard Davis (tracks 2, 4, 7 & 9), Chuck Israels (tracks 1, 3, 5, 6, 8 & 10) - bass
- Walter Perkins - drums
