= My Fair Lady (Shelly Manne album) =

Studio album by Shelly Manne
- Released: 1956
- Recorded: August 17, 1956
- Studio: Contemporary Records (Los Angeles)
- Genre: Jazz
- Length: 35:56
- Label: Contemporary Records; C 3527
- Producer: Lester Koenig

Shelly Manne chronology
More Swinging Sounds (1956)	My Fair Lady (1956)	Li'l Abner (1957)

André Previn chronology
Collaboration (1955)	My Fair Lady (1956)	Double Play! (1957)

Professional ratings
Review scores
Source	Rating
AllMusic	5/5 stars
The Rolling Stone Jazz Record Guide	1/5 stars
The Penguin Guide to Jazz Recordings	3.5/4 stars

My Fair Lady, recorded by "Shelly Manne & His Friends" and released in 1956 by Contemporary Records, is the first album ever made consisting entirely of jazz versions of tunes from a single Broadway musical. It was an instant hit and became one of the best-selling jazz albums of its day.

== Origins ==
Shelly Manne & his Friends* (*André Previn and Leroy Vinnegar): modern jazz performances of songs from My Fair Lady, as the full name appeared on the 12-inch LP jacket (Contemporary Records C3527), was begun when drummer Shelly Manne, pianist André Previn, and bassist Leroy Vinnegar assembled on August 17, 1956, in the Contemporary studios in Los Angeles to produce an album of jazz versions of miscellaneous show tunes. (The three, having already recorded together as "Shelly Manne and His Friends", had some experience performing as a trio.)

Previn and Manne were exchanging ideas with producer Lester Koenig, who suggested they do some tunes from the current Broadway musical My Fair Lady. Manne and Previn were so impressed with the Lerner and Loewe songs for the show, that they decided to record more of them. They ended up filling the entire album with My Fair Lady tunes. Koenig brought in the complete score, and that evening Manne and Previn, between them, worked out the arrangements and recorded the entire album in one session, with Vinnegar providing the third "very important musical voice in the trio."

Lively and appealing, and clearly aimed at popular taste, the music also showed some daring, in the vein of the experimentation that was a factor in much West Coast jazz in the 1950s. Previn, with considerable musical training, and having composed several film scores himself, was able to suggest certain technical modifications to the harmony and other aspects of the music. Manne, as the date's leader, provided suggestions of his own, for example to treat what was a fast number in the show as a slow ballad instead. The final number, "I Could Have Danced All Night", was given a Latin touch, with Manne even adding the sound of a tambourine. "There was a total thing going back and forth," as Manne later put it.

The sound was recorded by Roy DuNann, later recognized as one of the great recording engineers.

== Legacy ==
The result of that session was an unexpectedly successful album, generally cited as the most successful jazz album up to that time, or at least one of them.

After that success, the combo, sometimes under Manne's name, other times under Previn's, as "André Previn and His Pals", recorded numerous other treatments of Broadway musicals in the next few years (the first with Vinnegar on bass, the rest with Red Mitchell, who took over the bass chair when Vinnegar left the group to pursue other musical opportunities), including Li'l Abner (1957), Pal Joey (1957), Gigi (1958), Bells Are Ringing (1958), and West Side Story (1959), all issued on the Contemporary label.

Shortly after the Manne hit with My Fair Lady had shown what could be done in this vein, that musical received whole-album treatment by other jazz artists. Billy Taylor and Quincy Jones brought out My Fair Lady Loves Jazz in 1957, and this was followed by albums of My Fair Lady music by Nat King Cole (Nat King Cole Sings My Fair Lady); Wild Bill Davis; Dick Hyman with Ruby Braff; Oscar Peterson (The Oscar Peterson Trio Plays "My Fair Lady"); and others.

Manne himself worked with arranger John Williams to present a different treatment of the musical in 1964, first issued as My Fair Lady with the Un-Original Cast, and later reissued as My Fair Lady Swings. This album was based on arrangements thoroughly worked out in advance, and some of the tunes were sung by Jack Sheldon and Irene Kral.

== Track listing ==
All tunes by Frederick Loewe. (Lyrics of the original songs were by Alan Jay Lerner.)

1. "Get Me to the Church on Time" - 4:11
2. "On the Street Where You Live" - 5:37
3. "I've Grown Accustomed to Her Face" - 3:21
4. "Wouldn't It Be Loverly" - 5:31
5. "Ascot Gavotte" - 4:17
6. "Show Me" - 3:40
7. "With a Little Bit of Luck" - 6:01
8. "I Could Have Danced All Night" - 3:00

== Personnel ==
Shelly Manne & His Friends

- Shelly Manne - drums, leader
- André Previn - piano
- Leroy Vinnegar - bass

Technical

- Lester Koenig - producer
- Roy DuNann - recording engineer
