= Virtuoso (Joe Pass album) =

Studio album by Joe Pass
- Released: December 1973
- Recorded: August 28, 1973
- Studio: MGM Recording Studios, Los Angeles
- Genre: Jazz
- Length: 51:51
- Label: Pablo
- Producer: Norman Granz

Joe Pass chronology
Intercontinental (1970)	Virtuoso (1973)	Live at Donte's (1974)

Professional ratings
Review scores
Source	Rating
All About Jazz	(favorable)
Allmusic	5/5 stars
The Rolling Stone Jazz Record Guide	5/5 stars
The Penguin Guide to Jazz Recordings	4/4 stars

Virtuoso is an album by jazz guitarist Joe Pass that was released in 1973. It consists of solo guitar performances of several popular standards, including one original composition ("Blues for Alican"). The album is widely considered to be Pass' best, as well as one of the best jazz guitar albums of all time. The remastered version used 20-bit K2 Super Coding System technology and included liner notes by Benny Green.

== Reception ==
Contemporaneous reviews were positive. For example, The Guardian commented on Pass' "staggering dexterity, [...] matched by his fluency of ideas and the originality of his voicing", and The Irish Times stated that, "Apart from a certain fallibility with regard to time, Pass is without significant fault, a fact borne out by the quite incredible performances here".

Looking back from 2005, All About Jazz described the album as "the recording to announce that Joe Pass had arrived", and said that he had "accomplished, using standard guitar performance techniques, to play lead melody lines, chords, and bass rhythm simultaneously and at tempo, giving the listener the impression that multiple guitars were being played". The Penguin Guide to Jazz Recordings listed the album as part of its suggested “core collection” of essential recordings.

== Track listing ==
1. "Night and Day" (Cole Porter) – 3:32
2. "Stella by Starlight" (Victor Young) – 5:10
3. "Here's That Rainy Day" (Jimmy Van Heusen) – 3:36
4. "My Old Flame" (Arthur Johnston) – 5:17
5. "How High the Moon" (Morgan Lewis) – 4:59
6. "Cherokee" (Ray Noble) – 3:37
7. "Sweet Lorraine" (Cliff Burwell) – 4:09
8. "Have You Met Miss Jones?" (Richard Rodgers) – 4:42
9. "'Round Midnight" (Thelonious Monk, Cootie Williams) – 3:38
10. "All the Things You Are" (Jerome Kern) – 4:01
11. "Blues for Alican" (Joe Pass) – 5:29
12. "The Song Is You" (Kern) – 4:34

== Personnel ==
- Joe Pass – guitar

== Sales and chart positions ==
Virtuoso outsold nearly every other release in the Pablo catalog and established Pass as the premier mainstream jazz guitarist of the time.

Year	Chart	Position
1974	Billboard Jazz Albums	16
