= A Sign of the Times (Joe Pass album) =

Studio album by Joe Pass
- Released: 1965
- Genre: Jazz
- Length: 28:53
- Label: World Pacific
- Producer: Richard Bock

Joe Pass chronology
For Django (1964)	A Sign of the Times (1965)	The Stones Jazz (1967)

A Sign of the Times is an album by American jazz guitarist Joe Pass that was released in 1965 by World Pacific Records. It includes orchestrated versions of pop hits. The title track was a hit for Petula Clark. The album was reissued on CD with Simplicity in 2002 by Euphoria.

== Reception ==
Professional ratings
Review scores
Source	Rating
Allmusic	2/5 stars

In his Allmusic review, Scott Yanow called it "A historical curiosity at best".

== Track listing ==
1. "A Sign of the Times" (Tony Hatch)
2. "Sensa Fine" (Gino Paoli, Alec Wilder)
3. "Nowhere Man" (John Lennon, Paul McCartney)
4. "Dindi" (Ray Gilbert, Antônio Carlos Jobim)
5. "A Summer Song" (Clive Metcalfe, Keith Noble, Chad Stuart)
6. "Moment to Moment" (Henry Mancini, Johnny Mercer)
7. "It Was a Very Good Year" (Ervin Drake)
8. "Are You There (With Another Girl)" (Burt Bacharach, Hal David)
9. "What Now My Love (Et Maintenant)" (Gilbert Bécaud, Pierre Delanoë, Carl Sigman)
10. "Softly as I Leave You" (Giorgio Calabrese, Antonio De Vita, Hal Shaper)
11. "Sweet September" (Bill McGuffie, Phyllis L. Kasha, Stanley Mills)

== Personnel ==
- Joe Pass – guitar
- Chet Baker – flugelhorn
- Frank Capp – drums
- Bob Florence – arranger, conductor
- Unidentified vocal group and orchestra
- Bruce Botnick – engineer
