= Simplicity (Joe Pass album) =

Studio album by Joe Pass
- Released: 1967
- Recorded: 1967
- Genre: Jazz
- Length: 34:09
- Label: Pacific Jazz
- Producer: Richard Bock

Joe Pass chronology
The Stones Jazz (1966)	Simplicity (1967)	Guitar Interludes (1969)

Simplicity is an album by jazz guitarist Joe Pass that was released in 1967. Simplicity was reissued with A Sign of the Times on CD by Euphoria Records in 2002.

== Reception ==
Professional ratings
Review scores
Source	Rating
AllMusic	3/5 stars
The Rolling Stone Jazz Record Guide	3/5 stars

Writing for AllMusic, music critic Ron Wynn wrote of the album: "smooth, fluent songs, crisp, polished solos, and sentimental material, and does everything with a modicum of effort and intensity".

== Track listing ==
1. "You and Me" (Vinicius de Moraes, Carlos Lyra)
2. "'Tis Autumn" (Henry Nemo)
3. "Luciana" (Antônio Carlos Jobim, de Moraes, Gene Lees)
4. "I Had the Craziest Dream" (Mack Gordon, Harry Warren)
5. "Nobody Else but Me" (Oscar Hammerstein II, Jerome Kern)
6. "Simplicity" (Joe Pass)
7. "The Sands of Time" (Timothy Barr, Jerry Leshay)
8. "Sometime Ago" (Sergio Mihanovich)
9. "The Gentle Rain" (Luiz Bonfá, Matt Dubey)
10. "Who Can I Turn To?" (Leslie Bricusse, Anthony Newley)
11. "Where Was I (Donde Estuve Yo)" (Tommye Karen, Allan Reuss, Rainey Robinson)

== Personnel ==
- Joe Pass – guitar
- Hagood Hardy – vibes
- Julian Lee – piano, organ
- Bob Whitlock – double bass
- Colin Bailey – drums
