= Ballads: Solo Jazz Standards =

Studio album by André Previn
- Released: 1996
- Genre: Jazz
- Label: Angel Records - CDC 555391
- Producer: Phil Ramone

André Previn chronology
Sure Thing: The Jerome Kern Songbook (1996)	Ballads: Solo Jazz Standards (1996)	Come Rain or Shine: The Harold Arlen Songbook (1996)

Ballads: Solo Jazz Standards is a 1996 album by André Previn.

== Reception ==
Professional ratings
Review scores
Source	Rating
Allmusic	4/5 stars

The album was reviewed by Ken Dryden at Allmusic who wrote that Previn "...chose songs simply by grabbing sheet music and trying out a few quick impressions before quickly deciding to record it or move on to the next number. While most of the selections will be very familiar, he also included less frequently heard works. ...This low-key but lovely CD is perfect for late-night listening with someone special".

== Track listing ==
1. "More Than You Know" (Edward Eliscu, Billy Rose, Vincent Youmans) – 4:08
2. "It Could Happen to You" (Johnny Burke, Jimmy Van Heusen) – 4:48
3. "My Funny Valentine" (Richard Rodgers, Lorenz Hart) – 3:03
4. "How Are Things in Glocca Morra?" (E.Y. "Yip" Harburg, Burton Lane) – 4:27
5. "Have You Met Miss Jones?" (Rodgers, Hart) – 4:22
6. "In Our Little Boat" (André Previn) – 2:58
7. "As Time Goes By" (Herman Hupfeld) – 2:59
8. "My Melancholy Baby" (Ernie Burnett, George A. Norton) – 4:47
9. "It Only Happens When I Dance with You" (Irving Berlin) – 4:17
10. "Angel Eyes" (Earl Brent, Matt Dennis) – 4:06
11. "In the Wee Small Hours of the Morning" (Bob Hilliard, David Mann) – 3:40
12. "It Might as Well Be Spring" (Oscar Hammerstein II, Rodgers) – 4:04
13. "The Second Time Around" (Sammy Cahn, Van Heusen) – 4:10
14. "Dance of Life" (Johnny Mercer, Previn) – 3:16

== Personnel ==
- André Previn – piano
