= Guitar Interludes =

Studio album by Joe Pass
- Released: 1977
- Recorded: August 20, 1969
- Studio: Amigo Studios, Los Angeles
- Genre: Jazz
- Label: Discovery
- Producer: Albert Marx

Joe Pass chronology
Simplicity (1967)	Guitar Interludes (1977)	Intercontinental (1970)

Guitar Interludes is an album by American jazz guitarist Joe Pass that was recorded in 1969 but not released until 1977.

== Reception ==
Professional ratings
Review scores
Source	Rating
AllMusic	1.5/5 stars
The Rolling Stone Jazz Record Guide	2/5 stars

Writing for AllMusic, music critic Scott Yanow said of the album: "This odd LP certainly stands out in his discography. The five brief 'Interludes,' along with 'Joey's Blues,' feature Pass playing unaccompanied for some of the first times on record, but with the exception of the 'Blues,' the music is quiet and uneventful. The remaining seven selections are quite a contrast, for they feature Pass and a funky rhythm section essentially accompanying seven singers on a variety of very dated pop songs; for his part, Pass sounds quite uncomfortable."

By contrast, contemporaneous reviewers appear to have been a bit more impressed. Billboard features Interludes in its "Top Album Picks" for December 17, 1977, while Cash Box's "Jazz Album Picks" for August 27 include it along with five other LPs—among them, Diz and Getz, Gene Harris's Tone Tantrum, and the Kenny Drew-Niels-Henning Ørsted Pedersen Duo Live in Concert—accompanied by a brief but glowing assessment.

Hearing Joe Pass away from the Pablo jam session is instructive. [...] The taste and inventiveness are all here, and if the results are as much pop as they are jazz, that is o.k. with Pass and with us. The music has strong MOR appeal.

== Track listing ==
All tracks composed by Joe Pass except where indicated

1. "Interlude #1 (Song for Alison)"
2. "Interlude #2 (For Bobbye)"
3. "Interlude #3 (Levanto Seventy)"
4. "Interlude #4 (Vesper Dreams)"
5. "Interlude #5 (Shasti)"
6. "Joey's Blues"
7. "The Maid with the Flaxen Hair" (Claude Debussy)
8. "A Time for Us" (Edwin Snyder, Larry Kusik, Nino Rota)
9. "Peter Peter" (Irwin Rosman)
10. "Go Back to Her" (Allen Rosman, Irwin Rosman)
11. "Don't Walk Away" (Irwin Rosman)
12. "Long Ago Yesterday" (Irwin Rosman)
13. "Blue Carousel" (Irwin Rosman)

== Personnel ==
- Joe Pass – guitar
- Mike Melvoin – keyboards
- Del Casher – guitar
- Vincent Terri – guitar
- Jesse Ehrlich – cello
- Monty Budwig – bass
- Jim Hughart – bass
- Colin Bailey – drums
- Frank Severino – drums
- Victor Feldman – percussion
- Bob Smale – arranger, conductor
