= Intercontinental (album) =

Studio album by Joe Pass
- Released: 1970
- Recorded: June 8–10, 1970
- Studio: Tonstudio, Villingen-Schwenningen, Germany
- Genre: Jazz
- Length: 47:17
- Label: MPS
- Producer: Hans Georg Brunner-Schwer

Joe Pass chronology
Guitar Interludes (1969)	Intercontinental (1970)	Virtuoso (1971)

Professional ratings
Review scores
Source	Rating
Allmusic	4/5 stars
The Rolling Stone Jazz Record Guide	3/5 stars

Intercontinental is an album by jazz guitarist Joe Pass that was released in 1970. The album is a collection of mainly swing and Latin jazz standards with the exception of the country/pop hit "Ode to Billie Joe". Supporting musicians are drummer Kenny Clare and bassist Eberhard Weber, and the album is a rare example of the latter playing straight-ahead jazz standards. A "DBX" encoded version of the album was released by Pausa Records in 1974.

== Track listing ==
1. "Chlo-e" (Gus Kahn, Neil Moret) – 5:24
2. "Meditation" (Antônio Carlos Jobim, Newton Mendonça, Norman Gimbel) – 5:25
3. "I Cover the Waterfront" (Johnny Green, Edward Heyman) – 4:15
4. "I Love You" (Cole Porter)
5. "Stompin' at the Savoy" (Benny Goodman, Andy Razaf, Edgar Sampson, Chick Webb) – 4:15
6. "Watch What Happens" (Michel Legrand) – 5:25
7. "Joe's Blues" (Joe Pass) – 6:00
8. "El Gento" (Willi Fruth) – 4:03
9. "Ode to Billie Joe" (Bobbie Gentry) – 3:30
10. "Lil' Darlin'" (Neal Hefti) – 3:45

== Personnel ==
- Joe Pass – guitar
- Eberhard Weber – bass
- Kenny Clare – drums
