= The Stones Jazz =

Studio album by Joe Pass
- Released: 1967
- Recorded: July 20, 1966
- Studio: Los Angeles
- Genre: Jazz
- Label: World Pacific
- Producer: Richard Bock

Joe Pass chronology
A Sign of the Times (1965)	The Stones Jazz (1967)	Simplicity (1967)

The Stones Jazz is an album by jazz guitarist Joe Pass that was released in 1967. Except for one song, all tracks are jazz covers of songs recorded by The Rolling Stones.

== Reception ==
Professional ratings
Review scores
Source	Rating
Allmusic	1.5/5 stars

Writing for Allmusic, music critic Ken Dryden wrote of the album "...this LP was clearly one for a paycheck when most jazz players were scratching for work... A very unlikely candidate for reissue on CD, this record will be sought by Joe Pass fanatics only."

== Track listing ==
All songs by Mick Jagger and Keith Richards unless otherwise noted.

1. "Play with Fire" (Nanker Phelge)
2. "19th Nervous Breakdown"
3. "I Am Waiting"
4. "Lady Jane"
5. "Not Fade Away" (Buddy Holly, Norman Petty)
6. "Mother's Little Helper"
7. "(I Can't Get No) Satisfaction"
8. "Paint It Black"
9. "What a Shame"
10. "As Tears Go By" (Jagger, Richards, Andrew Loog Oldham)
11. "Stone Jazz" (Joe Pass)

== Personnel ==
- Joe Pass – guitar
- Milt Bernhart – trombone
- Dick Hamilton – trombone
- Herbie Harper – trombone
- Gail Martin – trombone
- Bill Perkins – tenor saxophone
- Bob Florence – piano, arranger, conductor
- Dennis Budimir – guitar
- John Pisano – guitar
- Ray Brown – double bass
- John Guerin – drums
- Victor Feldman – percussion
- Bruce Botnick – engineer
