= Pal Joey (André Previn album) =

Studio album by André Previn & His Pals
- Released: 1957
- Recorded: October 28 & 29, 1957
- Studios: Contemporary Records, Los Angeles, California
- Genre: Jazz
- Length: 39:48
- Label: Contemporary C3543/S7543
- Producer: Lester Koenig

André Previn chronology
Double Play! (1957)	Pal Joey (1957)	Gigi (1958)

Pal Joey (full title Modern Jazz Performances of Songs from Pal Joey) is a jazz album by pianist André Previn & His Pals, bassist Red Mitchell and drummer Shelly Manne, recorded in 1957 and released on the Contemporary label. The album features Previn's jazz interpretations of songs from Richard Rodgers and Lorenz Hart's broadway musical, Pal Joey and followed the success of Manne's 1956 album, My Fair Lady. The album was recorded around the same time as the release of the motion picture.

== Reception ==
Professional ratings
Review scores
Source	Rating
AllMusic	4/5 stars
The Penguin Guide to Jazz Recordings	3/4 stars

The AllMusic review by Scott Yanow states: "Best known is 'I Could Write a Book,' which quickly became a standard, but the other, more obscure songs such as 'Take Him,' 'Zip' and 'Do It the Hard Way' are also generally good devices for jazz improvising. An enjoyable set of straight-ahead trio music". On All About Jazz Dave Rickerts states "Surprisingly Pal Joey seems like it would come later on in Previn's career when he might be scraping the bottom of the barrel for musicals to swing... It's clearly not a top shelf musical; only two songs from it became standards and it's rarely revived today. Still, there must have been something to grab Previn over other more worthy material, and the trio make a silk purse out a sow's ear by taking the mediocre and producing some wonderful improvisations".

== Track listing ==
All compositions music by Richard Rodgers and lyrics by Lorenz Hart.

1. "I Could Write a Book" - 4:52
2. "That Terrific Rainbow" - 6:04
3. "Bewitched, Bothered and Bewildered" - 5:37
4. "Take Him" - 3:35
5. "Zip" - 3:40
6. "It's a Great Big Town" - 3:34
7. "What Is a Man?" - 3:19
8. "I'm Talkin' with My Pal" - 5:02
9. "Do It the Hard Way" - 4:05

== Personnel ==
André Previn & His Pals

- André Previn - piano
- Red Mitchell - bass
- Shelly Manne - drums
