= All Alone (André Previn album) =

Studio album by André Previn
- Released: 1967
- Genre: Jazz
- Label: RCA Victor - LSP-3806
- Producer: Joe Reisman

André Previn chronology
Previn with Voices (1967)	All Alone (1967)	Right as the Rain (1967)

All Alone is a 1967 album by André Previn.

== Reception ==
The initial Billboard magazine review from May 1967 included the album as a 'Pop Special Merit' pick and wrote that "Previn plays the romantic standards simply and effectively. He doesn't showboat but stays pretty much with the melodies as they were written".

== Track listing ==
1. "More Than You Know" (Edward Eliscu, Billy Rose, Vincent Youmans) – 2:10
2. "I Got It Bad (and That Ain't Good)" (Duke Ellington, Paul Francis Webster) – 2:20
3. "Everything Happens to Me" (Matt Dennis, Tom Adair) – 2:37
4. "You Are Too Beautiful" (Richard Rodgers, Lorenz Hart) – 3:42
5. "How Deep Is the Ocean?" (Irving Berlin) – 3:14
6. "Angel Eyes" (Dennis, Earl Brent) – 2:57
7. "When Sunny Gets Blue" (Marvin Fisher, Jack Segal) – 2:42
8. "As Time Goes By" (Herman Hupfeld) – 2:33
9. "Remember Me?" (Harry Warren, Al Dubin) – 3:37
10. "Yesterdays" (Jerome Kern, Otto Harbach) – 3:34
11. "Dancing on the Ceiling" (Rodgers, Hart) – 2:52
12. "Here's That Rainy Day" (Jimmy Van Heusen, Johnny Burke) – 3:00

== Personnel ==
- André Previn – piano
- Hank Cicalo – engineer
- Leonard Feather – liner notes
- Joe Reisman – producer
