= The Subterraneans (film) =

1960 film by Ranald MacDougall

- Film poster by Joseph Smith
- Directed by: Ranald MacDougall
- Written by: Robert Thom
- Based on: novel by Jack Kerouac
- Produced by: Arthur Freed
- Starring: George Peppard; Leslie Caron; Roddy McDowall; Janice Rule
- Cinematography: Joseph Ruttenberg
- Edited by: Ben Lewis
- Music by: Andre Previn
- Distributed by: Metro-Goldwyn-Mayer
- Release date: 1960
- Running time: 89 minutes
- Country: United States
- Language: English
- Budget: $1.4 million
- Box office: $765,000

The Subterraneans is a 1960 American drama film directed by Ranald MacDougall based on the 1958 novel of the same name by Jack Kerouac.

== Plot ==
Leo is a 28-year-old novelist who still lives at home with his mother. One night he stumbles upon some beatniks at a coffee house. He falls in love with the beautiful but unstable Mardou Fox.

Roxanne warns Mardou away from Leo, who says his love for her is causing him writer's block. Mardou falls pregnant. She and Leo wind up together.

== Cast ==
- Leslie Caron as Mardou Fox
- George Peppard as Leo Percepied
- Janice Rule as Roxanne
- Roddy McDowall as Yuri Gligoric
- Anne Seymour as Charlotte Percepied
- Jim Hutton as Adam Moorad
- Scott Marlowe as Julien Alexander
- Arte Johnson as Arial Lavalerra
- Ruth Storey as Analyst
- Bert Freed as Bartender
- Gerry Mulligan as Reverend Joshua Hoskins
- Carmen McRae as herself
- Nanette Fabray as Society Woman (uncredited)

== Production ==
The novel was optioned by Arthur Freed of Metro-Goldwyn-Mayer as a possible follow up to Some Came Running. Like that film, it was originally intended to star Dean Martin. Nicole Maurey was announced to play the female lead.

In May 1959 it was announced Dennis and Terry Sanders were going to make the film.

Eventually George Peppard and Leslie Caron were signed. Roddy McDowall also joined the cast, his first film in nine years. Janice Rule was then married to Robert Thom, who wrote the script. Jim Hutton had just been put under contract to MGM.

This adaptation changed the African American character Mardou Fox, Kerouac's love interest, to a young French girl (played by Leslie Caron) to better pacify racists. While it was derided and vehemently criticized by Allen Ginsberg, among others, for its two-dimensional characters, it is an example of the way Hollywood attempted to exploit the emerging popularity of Beat culture as it grew in San Francisco and Greenwich Village, New York, without really understanding it.

A Greenwich Village beatnik bar setting had been used for scenes in Richard Quine's film Bell, Book and Candle (1958), but Ranald MacDougall's adaptation of Kerouac's novel, scripted by Robert Thom, was less successful.

The Subterraneans was one of the final films Arthur Freed produced for MGM and features a score by André Previn and brief appearances by jazz singer Carmen McRae singing "Coffee Time," and saxophonists Gerry Mulligan, as a street priest, and Art Pepper. Comedian Arte Johnson plays the Gore Vidal character, here named Arial Lavalerra.

According to film historian Hugh Fordin in his 1975 study of the Freed Unit, the version of the film that first previewed at the Encino Theater on January 20, 1960, was drastically different from the version that was later released by the studio, and one that "showed the confusion, the disorientation, and the frustration of the new breed of young people. Anyone with an open mind could understand what motivated them, what made them so alienated. But The Subterraneans was slashed to pieces and made totally incomprehensible. Although there was no problems with the censors, (MGM head editor) Margaret Booth proceeded to mutlitate the film beyond recognition, in an effort to protect the healthy roar of Leo the Lion, and to uphold the "American image."

== Reception ==
=== Box-office ===
According to MGM records, the film closed production on October 23, 1959 at a final cost of $931,724.93. It earned only $340,000 in the US and Canada and $425,000 elsewhere resulting, after other studio costs were included, in a loss of $1,311,000.

=== Critical ===
According to Filmink "I completely buy Peppard’s performance in this movie as a self-loathing, boozy aspiring writer, who gets consumed by his passions… after all, he was that in real life to a certain degree (he’s certainly better cast than Roddy McDowall and Jim Hutton as beatniks). But the film just feels silly."

== Musical score and soundtrack ==
The Subterraneans

Soundtrack album by André Previn
- Released: 1960
- Recorded: September 2, 1959, and January 11 & 12 and February 3, 1960; MGM Studios, Culver City, CA
- Genre: Film score
- Label: MGM; SE 3812 ST

André Previn chronology
West Side Story (1959)	The Subterraneans (1960)	Like Previn! (1960)

Professional ratings
Review scores
Source	Rating
Allmusic	3.5/5 stars

The film score was composed, arranged and conducted by André Previn, with the motion picture also featuring Previn's jazz trio. The soundtrack album was released on the MGM label in 1960.

AllMusic's Jason Ankeny observed: "André Previn had the good sense to recruit cool jazz giants including Gerry Mulligan, Russ Freeman, and Dave Bailey to perform his Subterraneans score: jazz not only fueled Kerouac's work, but his prose sought to evoke the rhythms and energy of bebop. Indeed, this music comes far closer to accurately capturing Kerouac's writing than any of the film's dialogue. Previn also deserves credit for articulating the sadness of the original novel, deftly combining horns and strings to create a score that is dark and emotive".

=== Track listing ===
All compositions by André Previn except as indicated

1. "Why Are We Afraid" (Previn, Dory Langan) – 1:57
2. "Guido's Blackhawk" – 3:05
3. "Two by Two" – 4:00
4. "Bread and Wine" – 4:12
5. "Coffee Time" (Harry Warren, Arthur Freed) – 2:43
6. "A Rose and the End" – 3:24
7. "Should I" (Nacio Herb Brown, Freed) – 2:28
8. "Look Ma, No Clothes" – 1:32
9. "Things are Looking Down" – 5:39
10. "Analyst" – 4:19
11. "Like Blue" – 1:58
12. "Raising Caen" – 3:02

=== Personnel ===
- André Previn – piano, arranger, conductor
- Gerry Mulligan – baritone saxophone (tracks 1, 3, 4, 6 and 8–10)
- Carmen McRae – vocals (track 5)
- Art Farmer (tracks 4 & 9), Jack Sheldon (1, 3, 6, 8 & 10 and 12) – trumpet
- Bob Enevoldsen – valve trombone (tracks 1, 3, 4, 6 and 9)
- Art Pepper – alto saxophone (tracks 1, 3, 4, 6 & 8–10 and 12)
- Bill Perkins – tenor saxophone (tracks 1, 3, 4, 6 and 9)
- Russ Freeman – piano (tracks 4, 9 and 12)
- Buddy Clark (tracks 4 & 9), Red Mitchell (tracks 1–3, 5–8, and 10–12) – bass
- Dave Bailey (tracks 4 & 9), Shelly Manne (tracks 1–3, 5–8, and 10–12) – drums
- Unidentified string section, clarinet and oboe (tracks 1, 3, 6, 8 and 10)

== See also ==
- List of American films of 1960
