= Come Rain or Shine: The Harold Arlen Songbook =

Studio album by André Previn and Sylvia McNair
- Released: 1996
- Recorded: August 1995
- Studio: Campion Center, Weston, Massachusetts
- Genre: Jazz
- Length: 1:09:11
- Label: Philips 446 818-2
- Producer: John Patterson

André Previn chronology
André Previn and Friends Play Show Boat (1995)	Come Rain or Shine: The Harold Arlen Songbook (1996)	Jazz at the Musikverein (1997)

Sylvia McNair chronology
Come Rain or Shine: The Harold Arlen Songbook (1996)

Come Rain or Shine: The Harold Arlen Songbook is a 1996 album by André Previn and Sylvia McNair of songs by the composer Harold Arlen.

The initial Billboard magazine review from June 8, 1996, commented that "McNair is best in cozy renditions of Arlen ballads, giving away a tad too-much of her concert hall skills on the rhythm numbers...the album has that wonderful, intimate air of a singer and musician who got together for what turned out to be a charming gathering 'round the keyboard".

Come Rain or Come Shine was also reviewed in BBC Music Magazine, San Diego Magazine and Gramophone.

== Track listing ==
- All music by Harold Arlen, lyricists indicated
1. "Over the Rainbow" (E.Y. "Yip" Harburg) – 3:52
2. "Stormy Weather" (Ted Koehler) – 4:20
3. "Between the Devil and the Deep Blue Sea" (Koehler) – 2:01
4. "It Was Written in the Stars" (Leo Robin) – 4:29
5. "As Long as I Live" (Koehler) – 4:03
6. "That Old Black Magic" (Johnny Mercer) – 3:02
7. "The Morning After" (Dory Previn) – 3:18
8. "A Sleepin' Bee" (Truman Capote) – 5:29
9. "Ac-Cent-Tchu-Ate the Positive" (Mercer) – 2:56
10. "Goose Never Be a Peacock" (Mercer) – 3:55
11. "I Wonder What Became of Me" (Mercer) – 3:23
12. "It's Only a Paper Moon" (Harburg, Billy Rose) – 2:41
13. "Two Ladies in de Shade of de Banana Tree" (Capote) – 2:13
14. "Cocoanut Sweet" (Harburg) – 5:30
15. "Right as the Rain" (Harburg) – 3:28
16. "I've Got the World on a String" (Koehler) – 3:43
17. "Come Rain or Come Shine" (Mercer) – 4:13
18. "This Time the Dream's on Me" (Mercer) – 3:34
19. "Let's Take a Walk Around the Block" (Ira Gershwin, Harburg) – 5:39
20. "Last Night When We Were Young" (Harburg) – 2:46

== Personnel ==
- André Previn – piano
- Sylvia McNair – vocals
- David Finck – double bass

=== Production ===
- John Newton – engineer
- John Patterson – producer
