= Jazz at the Musikverein =

Live album by André Previn
- Released: 19 August 1997
- Recorded: 24 June 1995
- Venue: Musikverein, Vienna
- Genre: Jazz
- Label: Verve – 537/7042

André Previn chronology
Come Rain or Shine: The Harold Arlen Songbook (1996)	Jazz at the Musikverein (1997)	We Got Rhythm: A Gershwin Songbook (1998)

Jazz at the Musikverein is a 1997 live album by André Previn with guitarist Mundell Lowe and bassist Ray Brown recorded at the Musikverein in Vienna.

== Reception ==
Professional ratings
Review scores
Source	Rating
Allmusic	4/5 stars
The Penguin Guide to Jazz Recordings	3.5/4 stars

The album was reviewed by Richard S. Ginell at Allmusic who described it as an "amiable collection of mostly vintage standards" that Previn, Brown and Lowe "probably know in their sleep. Previn is as fluid, witty and melodically inventive as ever in his bop-derived, light-fingered manner, with occasional side trips into stride and Brubeck-like chordal perorations...The lack of a drummer becomes an asset in this golden mellow hall; a drum kit would have upset the acoustical balance".

== Track listing ==
1. "Stompin' at the Savoy" (Benny Goodman, Andy Razaf, Edgar Sampson, Chick Webb) – 5:58
2. Introduction by André Previn – 1:52
3. "I Can't Get Started" (Vernon Duke, Ira Gershwin) – 4:53
4. "I'm Gonna Sit Right Down (And Write Myself a Letter)" (Fred E. Ahlert, Joe Young) – 5:56 5
5. Medley: "What'll I Do"/"Laura" (Irving Berlin)/(David Raksin, Johnny Mercer) – 6:56
6. "What Is This Thing Called Love?" (Cole Porter) – 5:27
7. "Captain Bill" (Monty Alexander, Ray Brown, Herb Ellis) – 4:24
8. "Satin Doll" (Duke Ellington, Mercer, Billy Strayhorn) – 7:17
9. "Hi Blondie" (André Previn) – 5:04
10. "This Time the Dream's on Me" (Harold Arlen, Mercer) – 4:49
11. "Medley: "Prelude to a Kiss"/"The Very Thought of You"/"Come Rain or Come Shine" (Ellington, Irving Gordon, Irving Mills)/(Ray Noble)/(Harold Arlen, Mercer) – 9:57
12. "Sweet Georgia Brown" (Ben Bernie, Kenneth Casey, Maceo Pinkard) – 6:24

== Personnel ==
- André Previn – piano
- Mundell Lowe – guitar
- Ray Brown – double bass

=== Production ===
- Giulio Turturro – art direction
- Andrew Wedman – balance engineer, editing
- Sheryl Lutz-Brown – design
- Reinhard Lagemann, Elizabeth Ostrow – engineer
- Alison Ames – executive producer
- Nate Herr – release coordinator
