= We Got Rhythm: A Gershwin Songbook =

Studio album by André Previn
- Released: 12 May 1998
- Recorded: August 1997
- Genre: Jazz
- Length: 1:11:59
- Label: Deutsche Grammophon - 453 492-2

André Previn chronology
Jazz at the Musikverein (1997)	We Got Rhythm: A Gershwin Songbook (1998)	We Got It Good and That Ain't Bad: An Ellington Songbook (1999)

Jazz at the Musikverein is a 1998 album by André Previn accompanied by bassist David Finck of the music of George Gershwin.

== Reception ==
Professional ratings
Review scores
Source	Rating
Allmusic	4/5 stars
The Penguin Guide to Jazz Recordings	3.5/4 stars

The album was reviewed by Ken Dryden at Allmusic who wrote that Previn "faces the same challenge every jazz musician must address: finding new paths through Gershwin's frequently recorded masterpieces". Dryden highlighted Previn's "train-like bassline substitution to open and close a rollicking take" of "They All Laughed" and his "laid-back" and "bluesy treatment" of "Oh, Lady Be Good".

== Track listing ==
- All music composed by George Gershwin with all lyrics written by Ira Gershwin
1. "They All Laughed" – 3:19
2. "Someone to Watch Over Me" – 5:03
3. "Oh, Lady Be Good" – 4:20
4. "A Foggy Day" – 5:51
5. "Soon"/"Do It Again!" – 5:37
6. "I Got Rhythm" – 5:14
7. "Embraceable You" – 4:56
8. "He Loves and She Loves"/"Love Is Here to Stay" – 6:54
9. "Fascinating Rhythm" – 3:35
10. "Isn't It a Pity?" – 4:44
11. "Boy! What Love Has Done To Me!"/"I've Got a Crush on You" – 4:32
12. "Love Walked In" – 6:05
13. "The Man I Love" – 5:27
14. "'S Wonderful" – 6:22

== Personnel ==
- André Previn – piano
- David Finck – double bass

=== Production ===
- Fred Munzmaier – art direction
- Philipp Nedel – assistant engineer
- John Newton – balance engineer
- Richard Evidon – booklet editor
- Al Hirschfeld – illustrations
- Edward Jablonski – liner notes
- Edward Steichen – photography
- Ellyn Kusmin – producer
