= We Got It Good and That Ain't Bad: An Ellington Songbook =

Studio album by André Previn
- Released: 1999
- Genre: Jazz
- Length: 1:12:32
- Label: Deutsche Grammophon - 289 463 456-2

André Previn chronology
We Got Rhythm: A Gershwin Songbook (1998)	We Got It Good and That Ain't Bad: An Ellington Songbook (1999)	Live at the Jazz Standard (2001)

We Got It Good and That Ain't Bad: An Ellington Songbook is a 1999 album by André Previn accompanied by bassist David Finck of the music of Duke Ellington.

== Reception ==
Professional ratings
Review scores
Source	Rating
Allmusic	4/5 stars
The Penguin Guide to Jazz Recordings	3/4 stars

The album was reviewed by Michael G. Nastos at Allmusic who wrote that "Previn's technical ability and heartfelt stretching of the original blueprints urge these well-worn tunes to carry new meaning and substance. If there are any stock treatments here, it's because the pianist tends to lay back and let the melodies come to him...Perhaps Previn's voracity is not well known, or as regarded in the modern jazz world as it should be, but on this recording it's clear how great he can be". Nastos concluded that the album was "a step up for the veteran pianist, and is perhaps his shining recorded hour".

Duncan Druce reviewed the album for Gramophone magazine and wrote that Previn and Finck "constantly take over each others' ideas in order to make something different out of them" and praised the "Brilliant, creative playing, then, and wonderful tunes - it's an impressive addition to Previn's enormous discography".

== Track listing ==
1. "Take the "A" Train" (Billy Strayhorn) – 5:32
2. "Isfahan" (Duke Ellington, Strayhorn) – 4:41
3. "I Got It Bad (And That Ain't Good)" (D. Ellington, Paul Francis Webster) – 3:46
4. "Do Nothin' Till You Hear From Me" (D. Ellington, Bob Russell) – 6:06
5. "Chelsea Bridge" (Strayhorn) – 6:24
6. "Things Ain't What They Used To Be" (Mercer Ellington, Ted Persons) – 6:46
7. "In a Sentimental Mood" (D. Ellington, Manny Kurtz, Irving Mills) – 5:16
8. "Squatty Roo" (Johnny Hodges) – 4:35
9. "Come Sunday" (D. Ellington) – 4:31
10. "Serenade to Sweden" (D. Ellington) – 6:32
11. "I Didn't Know About You" (D. Ellington, Russell) – 6:05
12. "In a Mellow Tone" (D. Ellington, Milt Gabler) – 7:44
13. "It Don't Mean a Thing (If It Ain't Got That Swing)" (D. Ellington, Mills) – 3:56

== Personnel ==
- André Previn – piano
- David Finck – double bass

=== Production ===
- Fred Munzmaier – art direction
- John Newton – engineer
- Al Hirschfeld – illustrations
- Gene Lees – liner notes
- Ellyn Kusmin – producer
