= What Headphones? =

Studio album by André Previn
- Released: 5 October 1993
- Genre: Jazz
- Length: 51:27
- Label: Angel Records – CDC 0777 7 54917 2 2

André Previn chronology
Kiri Sidetracks: The Jazz Album (1992)	What Headphones? (1993)	André Previn and Friends Play Show Boat (1995)

What Headphones? is a 1993 album by André Previn.

== Reception ==
Professional ratings
Review scores
Source	Rating
Allmusic	3/5 stars

The album was reviewed by Richard S. Ginell at Allmusic who wrote that it was Previn's "best album since his return to jazz at the close of the 1980s, and also the most surprising and unpredictable one of his entire jazz life". Ginell highlighted the title track, which he wrote was "almost avant-garde in its erudite looniness". Ginell praised Previn's playing as possessing "greater streaks of wit and a cannier use of space than ever before".

== Track listing ==
1. "What Headphones?" (André Previn) – 6:09
2. "You Are My All" (Myrna Summers) – 5:27
3. "Take the 'A' Train" (Billy Strayhorn) – 4:50
4. "Outside the Cafe" (A. Previn) – 3:10
5. "All Is Well" (Al Hobbs) – 4:42
6. "A Portrait of Bert Williams" (Duke Ellington) – 4:13
7. "Warm Valley" (Ellington, Bob Russell) – 5:30
8. "Holy Spirit in Me" (Jay Terrell) – 3:20
9. "I'm Beginning to See the Light" (Ellington, Don George, Johnny Hodges, Harry James) – 5:18
10. "You're Gonna Hear from Me" (A. Previn, Dory Previn) – 4:19
11. "You Never Gave Up on Me" (V. Michael McKay) – 4:32

== Personnel ==
- André Previn – piano, arranger, liner notes
- Ray Brown – double bass
- Warren Vaché – cornet
- Richard Todd – French horn
- Mundell Lowe – guitar
- Jim Pugh – trombone
- Grady Tate – drums
- Earl Brown Singers

=== Production ===
- Bob Abriola – art direction, director
- Roy Clark, Richard Clarke – assistant engineer
- Alice Butts – digital artwork, package design
- Qwendolyn Brown – director, musical direction
- Earle Brown – director
- Phil Ramone – engineer, producer
- John Patterson – engineer
- Will Friedwald, Gene Lees – liner notes
- Bernie Grundman, Allen Silverman – mastering
- Bryan Carrigan – mixing assistant
- Don Hahn – mixing
- Daniel Root – photography
- Anaida Garcia – production assistant
- Jill Dell'Abate – project coordinator
- Hugh Fordin – reissue producer
