= Sure Thing: The Jerome Kern Songbook =

Studio album by André Previn and Sylvia McNair
- Released: 1994
- Recorded: September 1993
- Studio: American Academy and Institute of Arts and Letters, New York City
- Genre: Jazz
- Length: 1:09:11
- Label: Philips 442 129-2
- Producer: Elizabeth Ostrow

André Previn chronology
What Headphones? (1993)	Sure Thing: The Jerome Kern Songbook (1994)	André Previn and Friends Play Show Boat (1995)

Sylvia McNair chronology
Sure Thing: The Jerome Kern Songbook (1994)

Sure Thing: The Jerome Kern Songbook is a 1994 album by André Previn and Sylvia McNair of songs by the composer Jerome Kern.

== Reception ==
Professional ratings
Review scores
Source	Rating
Allmusic	4.5/5 stars

The album was reviewed by Dave Nathan at Allmusic who wrote that aside from "There's no scatting or wordless singing and absolutely no risk-taking (except in the making of the album). Nevertheless, there are some very pleasant musical moments here, and on a couple of tunes McNair tries to inject some jazz feeling into her singing...Typically, Previn plays no-nonsense accompaniment for McNair, then takes a chorus or two in a jazz mode. There's no pretense here. McNair doesn't try to do jazz. Rather, she and her friends perform almost 70 minutes of very pleasant, straightforward music of one of the major contributors to the Great American Songbook ".

== Track listing ==
- All music by Jerome Kern, lyricists indicated
1. "Land Where the Good Songs Go" (PG Wodehouse) – 1:32
2. "I Won't Dance" (Dorothy Fields, Oscar Hammerstein II, Otto Harbach, Jimmy McHugh) – 3:09
3. "Nobody Else But Me" (Hammerstein) – 2:57
4. "The Folks Who Live On the Hill" (Hammerstein) – 5:57
5. "A Fine Romance" (Dorothy Fields) – 2:35
6. "Remind Me" (Fields) – 3:41
7. "You Couldn't Be Cuter" (Fields) – 2:53
8. "Why Was I Born?" (Hammerstein) – 3:59
9. "I'm Old Fashioned" (Johnny Mercer) – 3:40
10. "All The Things You Are" (Hammerstein) – 4:25
11. "Can't Help Singing"/"They Didn't Believe Me" (Yip Harburg)/(Herbert Reynolds) – 4:38
12. "Till The Clouds Roll By"/"Look for the Silver Lining" (Wodehouse)/(Buddy DeSylva) – 3:50
13. "Sure Thing"/"Long Ago (and Far Away)" (Ira Gershwin)/(Gershwin) – 5:32
14. "Can I Forget You"/"Smoke Gets In Your Eyes" (Hammerstein)/(Harbach) – 6:06
15. "Pick Yourself Up" (Fields) – 2:43
16. "The Song Is You" (Hammerstein) – 5:11
17. "Land Where The Good Songs Go (Reprise)" – 2:47
18. "Go Little Boat" (Wodehouse) – 3:36

== Personnel ==
- André Previn – piano
- Sylvia McNair – vocals
- David Finck – double bass

=== Production ===
- George Cramer, Anthony Freud – art direction
- John Newton – balance engineer
- Henk Kooistra – editing, engineer
- Max Harrison – liner notes
- Bill Winn – mixing assistant
- Christian Steiner – photography
- Phil Ramone – producer
