= King Size! =

Studio album by André Previn's Trio Jazz
- Released: 1959
- Recorded: November 26, 1958
- Studio: Contemporary Records Studio in Los Angeles, California
- Genre: Jazz
- Length: 45:38
- Label: Contemporary C3570/S7570
- Producer: Lester Koenig

André Previn chronology
André Previn Plays Songs by Vernon Duke (1958)	King Size! (1959)	André Previn Plays Songs by Jerome Kern (1959)

King Size! is a jazz album by pianist and composer André Previn recorded in 1958 and released on the Contemporary label.

== Reception ==
The AllMusic review by Scott Yanow states "This fine release gives one an excellent example of Previn's skills as a jazz pianist". On All About Jazz Dave Rickerts states "King Size is one of the few Previn albums not based around a musical or composer and thus lacks a little bit in focus. ...it takes confident and hardy souls to stretch tracks out to the nine minute mark in a trio setting as they do... Pleasant enough, but not as arresting as Previn's other work".

Professional ratings
Review scores
Source	Rating
AllMusic	4.5/5 stars
The Penguin Guide to Jazz Recordings	3/4 stars

== Track listing ==
All compositions by André Previn, except as indicated

1. "I'll Remember April" (Gene de Paul, Patricia Johnston, Don Raye) - 6:24
2. "Much Too Late" - 9:26
3. "You'd Be So Nice to Come Home To" (Cole Porter) - 6:59
4. "It Could Happen to You" (Jimmy Van Heusen, Johnny Burke) - 5:52
5. "Low and Inside" - 8:57
6. "I'm Beginning to See the Light" (Duke Ellington, Don George, Johnny Hodges, Harry James) - 8:00

== Personnel ==
André Previn's Trio Jazz

- André Previn - piano
- Red Mitchell - bass
- Frankie Capp - drums
