= A Different Kind of Blues =

Studio album by Itzhak Perlman and André Previn
- Released: 14 October 1980
- Venue: Heinz Hall, Pittsburgh
- Genre: Jazz, Jazz fusion
- Length: 36:31
- Label: Angel – DS-37780

Itzhak Perlman chronology
Itzhak Perlman & Pinchas Zukerman Play Music for Two Violins (1980)	A Different Kind of Blues (1980)	Itzhak Perlman Plays Fritz Kreisler Volume 3 (1980)

André Previn chronology
The Easy Winners (1975)	A Different Kind of Blues (1980)	Nice Work If You Can Get It (1983)

A Different Kind of Blues is a 1980 album by Itzhak Perlman and André Previn. It contains compositions by Previn.

== Reception ==
Professional ratings
Review scores
Source	Rating
Allmusic	4.5/5 stars

The album was reviewed by Richard S. Ginnel at Allmusic who wrote of Previn and Perlman that "the two classical partners actually made a really charming album the first time around" and compared Previn to "...the proverbial bicyclist who took a long sabbatical but never forgot how to ride", writing that he "still had plenty of keyboard invention in his fingers, and his tunes are consistently witty" and Perlman as "...not quite swinging but creating an alluring illusion of jazz feeling". Ginnel credits the album with anticipating "the rash of 'crossover' albums by classical artists that didn't take hold until late in the 1980s. And it remains more enjoyable than the vast majority of its successors".

== Track listing ==
- All music written by André Previn
1. "Look at Him Go" – 3:54
2. "Little Face" – 4:16
3. "Who Reads Reviews" – 4:15
4. "Night Thoughts" – 6:22
5. "A Different Kind of Blues" – 6:24
6. "Chocolate Apricot" – 5:04
7. "The Five of Us" – 2:55
8. "Make up Your Mind" – 3:51

== Personnel ==
- André Previn – piano
- Itzhak Perlman – violin
- Jim Hall – guitar
- Red Mitchell – double bass
- Shelly Manne – drums

=== Production ===
- Barry Golin – art direction
- Marvin Schwartz – cover design
- Rick Rankin – cover photo, photography
- Michael Sheady – engineer
- David Mermelstein – liner notes
- Don Hunstein – photography
- Suvi Raj Grubb – producer
