= Live at the Jazz Standard (André Previn album) =

Live album by André Previn
- Released: 27 March 2001
- Recorded: October 2000
- Venue: Jazz Standard, New York City
- Genre: Jazz
- Length: 1:01:09
- Label: Decca

André Previn chronology
We Got It Good and That Ain't Bad: An Ellington Songbook (1999)	Live at the Jazz Standard (2001)	Alone: Ballads for Solo Piano (2007)

Live at the Jazz Standard is a 2001 album by André Previn accompanied by bassist David Finck recorded live at the Jazz Standard club in New York City.

== Reception ==
Professional ratings
Review scores
Source	Rating
Allmusic	4/5 stars
The Penguin Guide to Jazz Recordings	3/4 stars

The album was reviewed by Jonathan Widran at AllMusic who wrote that "Previn draws from a wide range of classic tunes and throws in a few new compositions. He gives Gerry Mulligan's "Westwood Walk" an air of strutting confidence, an attitude he carries over to his own highly percussive piece "Hi Blondie." "My Funny Valentine" has been done perhaps a million times, but Previn and Finck bring out a quiet elegance that makes it sound as charming and fresh as ever. Seems like they're pretty intent on keeping the improvisations and energetic runs at the core because the minute they've lulled listeners into romantic complacency, they spruce up Cole Porter's "What Is This Thing Called Love" into what seems like a potent relay race".

== Track listing ==
1. "Westwood Walk" (Gerry Mulligan) – 4:13
2. "Hi Blondie" (André Previn) – 5:32
3. "My Funny Valentine" (Richard Rodgers, Lorenz Hart) – 4:44
4. "What Is This Thing Called Love?" (Cole Porter) – 4:26
5. "Come Sunday" (Duke Ellington) – 3:37
6. "Fungo" (Russ Freeman) – 6:24
7. "Chelsea Bridge" (Billy Strayhorn) – 4:54
8. "Bye Bye Sky" (Lukas Previn) – 3:00
9. "Batter Up" (Freeman) – 4:43 10
10. "Quiet Music"/"New Valley" (Alan and Marilyn Bergman)/(David Finck, A. Previn) – 6:25
11. "Oh, Lady Be Good" (George Gershwin, Ira Gershwin) – 5:08
12. "I Got Rhythm" (G. Gershwin, I. Gershwin) – 8:03

== Personnel ==
- André Previn – piano
- David Finck – double bass

=== Production ===
- Penny Bennett – art direction
- Lukas Previn – assistant producer
- Scott Townsend – design
- Tom Lazarus – engineer, mixing
- Scott Hull – mastering
- Jimmy Katz – photography
- Ellyn Kusmin – producer
