= Like Previn! =

Studio album by André Previn's Trio
- Released: 1960; October 21, 1994 (CD issue)
- Recorded: February 20 and March 1, 1960; Contemporary Records Studio, Los Angeles
- Genre: Jazz
- Length: 43:00
- Label: Contemporary; M 3575
- Producer: Lester Koenig

André Previn's Trio chronology
The Subterraneans (1960)	Like Previn! (1960)	André Previn Plays Songs by Harold Arlen (1960)

Like Previn! is the second jazz album by pianist André Previn and his trio. It was recorded on February 20 and March 1, 1960, at Contemporary Records' studio in Los Angeles. All eight compositions were written by Previn.

Despite being only his sophomore release with his own trio, Like Previn! was recorded when Previn was thirty-one years old and had already worked on music for over thirty motion pictures and came on the heels of two consecutive Academy Awards for his work on Gigi (1958) and Porgy & Bess (1959).

In his review, Scott Yanow states, "With fine assistance from bassist Red Mitchell and drummer Frankie Capp, Previn is in consistently swinging form on his originals and, even if none of the songs caught on, they make for a solid and varied set of bop-oriented music."

== Track listing ==
1. "Rosie Red" - 4:38
2. "If I Should Find You" - 4:23
3. "Sad Eyes" - 5:35
4. "Saturday" - 6:26
5. "Tricycle" - 6:05
6. "I'm Mina Mood" - 8:25
7. "No Words for Dory" - 3:29
8. "Three's Company" - 5:38

== Personnel ==
- André Previn - piano
- Frankie Capp - drums
- Red Mitchell - double-bass
- Roy DuNann & Howard Holzer - engineering
- Lester Koenig - producer
- Phil De Lancie - digital remastering (1994 re-release)

Professional ratings
Review scores
Source	Rating
AllMusic	4.5/5 stars
