= André Previn and J. J. Johnson =

Studio album by André Previn and J. J. Johnson
- Released: March 1962
- Recorded: December 31, 1961; Los Angeles, California
- Genre: Jazz
- Labels: Columbia; CL 1741/CS 8541
- Producer: Irving Townsend

J. J. Johnson chronology
A Touch of Satin (1961)	André Previn and J. J. Johnson (1962)	J.J.'s Broadway (1963)

André Previn chronology
André Previn Plays Songs by Harold Arlen (1960)	André Previn and J. J. Johnson (1961)	Duet (1962)

André Previn and J. J. Johnson (subtitled Play Kurt Weill's Mack the Knife & Bilbao-Song and Other Music from The Threepenny Opera, Happy End, Mahagonny) is an album by pianist André Previn and trombonist J. J. Johnson performing Kurt Weill's compositions which was released on the Columbia label.

== Reception ==
Professional ratings
Review scores
Source	Rating
AllMusic	3/5 stars

AllMusic awarded the album 3 stars.

== Track listing ==
All compositions by Kurt Weill.

1. "Bilbao Song" - 4:05 (from Happy End)
2. "Barbara Song" - 6:07 (from The Threepenny Opera)
3. "Overture" - 5:05 (from The Threepenny Opera)
4. "Seeräuberjenny" - 4:20 (from The Threepenny Opera)
5. "Mack the Knife (Moritat)" - 5:00
6. "Surabaya Johnny" - 4:15 (from Happy End)
7. "Wie man sich bettet" - 6:00 ("Meine Herren, meine Mutter prägte" from Rise and Fall of the City of Mahagonny)
8. "Unzulänglichkeit" - 4:55 (from The Threepenny Opera)

== Personnel ==
- André Previn – piano
- J. J. Johnson – trombone
- Red Mitchell – bass
- Frank Capp – drums
