= Li'l Abner (album) =

Studio album by Shelly Manne
- Released: 1957
- Recorded: February 6–7, 25, 1957
- Studio: Contemporary Records Studio, Los Angeles, California
- Genre: Jazz
- Length: 40:33
- Label: Contemporary; C 3533
- Producer: Lester Koenig

Shelly Manne chronology
My Fair Lady (1956)	Li'l Abner (1957)	Concerto for Clarinet & Combo (1955-57)

André Previn chronology
My Fair Lady (1956)	Li'l Abner (1957)	Double Play! (1957)

Li'l Abner is an album by Shelly Manne and His Friends, recorded in 1957 for Contemporary Records.

== Recording and music ==
The album was recorded at Contemporary's studio, Los Angeles, on February 6, 7, and 25, 1957. The musicians are drummer Shelly Manne, pianist André Previn, and bassist Leroy Vinnegar. The compositions were from the musical Li'l Abner.

== Release and reception ==
Professional ratings
Review scores
Source	Rating
AllMusic	3/5 stars
The Penguin Guide to Jazz	3/4 stars

Li'l Abner was released by Contemporary Records. The AllMusic review by Scott Yanow states: "The musicians are in fine form but the melodies are not too memorable". The All About Jazz reviewer also found the material limited. It was reissued in the Original Jazz Classics series.

== Track listing ==
All selections composed by Gene de Paul.

1. "Jubilation T. Cornpone" - 3:13
2. "The Country's in the Very Best of Hands" - 4:39
3. "If I Had My Druthers" - 2:46
4. "Unnecessary Town" - 5:04
5. "Matrimonial Stomp" - 4:35
6. "Progress Is the Root of All Evil" - 3:34
7. "Oh, Happy Day" - 4:28
8. "Namely You" - 5:49
9. "Past My Prime" - 7:25

== Personnel ==
- André Previn - piano
- Shelly Manne - drums
- Leroy Vinnegar - bass
