= Alone: Ballads for Solo Piano =

Studio album by André Previn
- Released: June 26, 2007
- Recorded: 2007
- Genre: Jazz
- Length: 45:38
- Label: EmArcy
- Producer: Robert Sadin, Chris Roberts

André Previn chronology
Live at the Jazz Standard (2001)	Alone: Ballads for Solo Piano (2007)

Alone: Ballads for Solo Piano is a 2007 studio album by the jazz pianist André Previn.

Alone peaked at number 8 on the Billboard Top Jazz Albums chart.

== Reception ==
Professional ratings
Review scores
Source	Rating
The Penguin Guide to Jazz Recordings	2.5/4 stars

The album was positively reviewed by Allmusic who wrote that "Don't hate him because he's popular...or because of his sundry talents. ...Previn's style is melodious and easygoing...but he can swing up a storm when he wants to." Allmusic described the mood of the album as "decidedly relaxed and touched with nostalgia as Previn embraces a set of emotionally charged standards." Harvey Siders reviewed Alone for the Jazz Times and wrote that "This collection of standards plus three originals reveals his prodigious technique along with other trademarks. Most notable is his ability to change keys in the most unexpected places." Siders particularly highlighted the key changes on "Skylark" and Previn's "gift for serious re-harmonization" on "It Might as Well Be Spring" and likened the bi-tonality of "My Ship" to the rose motif from Richard Strauss's Der Rosenkavalier.

== Track listing ==
1. "Angel Eyes" (Earl Brent, Matt Dennis) - 3:42
2. "The Second Time Around" (Sammy Cahn) - 3:19
3. "André's Blues" (André Previn) - 2:21
4. "Darkest Before the Dawn" (Johnny Mercer, A. Previn) - 2:06
5. "What Is This Thing Called Love?" (Cole Porter) - 2:14
6. "Night and Day" (Porter) - 3:54
7. "Bewitched, Bothered and Bewildered" (Lorenz Hart, Richard Rodgers) - 4:26
8. "I Can't Get Started" (Vernon Duke, Ira Gershwin) - 4:03
9. "My Ship" (Gershwin, Kurt Weill) - 2:53
10. "Skylark" (Hoagy Carmichael, Mercer) - 2:44
11. "I Didn't Know What Time It Was"/"A Ship Without a Sail" (Hart, Rodgers)/(Hart, Rodgers) - 5:45
12. "It Might as Well Be Spring" (Oscar Hammerstein II, Rodgers]) - 4:22
13. "You're Gonna Hear from Me" (A. Previn, Dory Previn) - 3:49

== Personnel ==
- André Previn – piano

Production

- Amy Merxbauer – a&r
- Pat Barry – art direction
- Anthony Ruotolo – assistant engineer, audio engineer
- Mark Wilder – audio consultant, mastering
- Dave Darlington – audio engineer, engineer
- Robert Sadin – audio production, producer
- Pawel Mielnik – design
- Chris Roberts – executive producer
- Tom Amdt – package coordinator
- Lillian Birnbaum – photography
- Gerhard Feldmann – preparation
- Rigdzin Collins – production assistant
- Evelyn Morgan – production coordination
