= André Previn and Friends Play Show Boat =

Studio album by André Previn
- Released: 1996
- Genre: Jazz
- Label: Deutsche Grammophon – 447 639-2
- Producer: Elizabeth Ostrow

André Previn chronology
Sure Thing: The Jerome Kern Songbook (1993)	André Previn and Friends Play Show Boat (1996)	Ballads: Solo Jazz Standards (1996)

André Previn and Friends Play Show Boat is a 1995 album by André Previn of songs from the 1927 musical Show Boat.

== Reception ==
Professional ratings
Review scores
Source	Rating
Allmusic	4/5 stars
The Penguin Guide to Jazz Recordings	3.5/4 stars

The album was reviewed by Scott Yanow at Allmusic who wrote that aside from "Make Believe", which was "unusually sweet" Previn's "interpretations of the other pieces are melodic, respectful and swinging". Ray Brown and Grady Tate were praised by Yanow as being "typically excellent in support".

== Track listing ==
1. "Make Believe" (Hammerstein, Kern) – 3:59
2. "Can't Help Lovin' Dat Man" (Hammerstein, Kern) – 5:02
3. "Ol' Man River" (Hammerstein, Kern) – 4:28
4. "Bill" (Hammerstein, Kern, PG Wodehouse) – 3:05
5. "Lickety Split" (André Previn) – 5:54
6. "White Wood" (Previn) – 6:57
7. "Dr. DJ" (Evelyn Hawkins)" (Previn) – 3:03
8. "Life upon the Wicked Stage" (Hammerstein, Kern) – 5:36
9. "Why Do I Love You?" (Hammerstein, Kern) – 3:18
10. "I Might Fall Back on You" (Hammerstein, Kern) – 3:03
11. "Nobody Else But Me" (Hammerstein, Kern) – 4:34

== Personnel ==
- André Previn – piano
- Mundell Lowe – guitar
- Ray Brown – double bass
- Grady Tate – drums

=== Production ===
- Elizabeth Ostrow – editing, producer
- Tom Lazarus – engineer
- Alison Ames – executive producer
- Miles Kreuger – illustrations
- Christian Steiner – photography
