= Gigi (André Previn album) =

Studio album by André Previn
- Released: 1958
- Recorded: April 7–8, 1958
- Studio: Contemporary's Studio, Los Angeles
- Genre: Jazz
- Length: 38:54
- Label: Contemporary
- Producer: Lester Koenig

André Previn chronology
Pal Joey (1957)	Gigi (1958)	André Previn Plays Songs by Vernon Duke (1958)

Gigi is a 1958 jazz album by André Previn, Shelly Manne and Red Mitchell. The full album name is Modern Jazz Performances of Songs from Gigi.

== Recording and music ==
The album was recorded in April 1958. The three musicians were pianist André Previn, bassist Red Mitchell, and drummer Shelly Manne. The material consists of eight songs from the musical Gigi.

== Reception ==
Professional ratings
Review scores
Source	Rating
AllMusic	4/5 stars
The Penguin Guide to Jazz	3/4 stars

The Penguin Guide to Jazz described the album in 1992 as having a "dated charm". The AllMusic reviewer Scott Yanow wrote: "Best known among the songs are 'I Remember It Well' and 'Thank Heaven for Little Girls', but the trio also uplifts and swings the other lesser-known tunes."

== Track listing ==
Original music by Frederick Loewe.

1. "The Parisians" – 4:35
2. "I Remember It Well" – 4:35
3. "A Toujours" – 5:49
4. "It's a Bore" – 4:18
5. "Aunt Alicia's March" – 5:15
6. "Thank Heaven for Little Girls" – 4:38
7. "Gigi" – 5:43
8. "She Is Not Thinking of Me" – 3:57

== Personnel ==
André Previn & His Pals

- André Previn – piano
- Red Mitchell – bass
- Shelly Manne – drums

Technical

- Phil De Lancie – digital remastering (1989 re-release)
