= André Previn Plays Songs by Jerome Kern =

Studio album by André Previn
- Released: 1959
- Recorded: February 26 and March 10, 1959
- Studio: Contemporary's Studio, Los Angeles
- Genre: Jazz
- Length: 43:10
- Label: Contemporary, M 3567, S 7567
- Producer: Lester Koenig

André Previn chronology
King Size! (1958)	André Previn Plays Songs by Jerome Kern (1959)	West Side Story (1959)

Professional ratings
Review scores
Source	Rating
DownBeat	3/5 stars
The Penguin Guide to Jazz	3/4 stars

André Previn Plays Songs by Jerome Kern is a solo jazz album by André Previn. It was intended as a homage to composer Jerome Kern. It was recorded in February and March 1959.

== Track listing ==
1. "Long Ago (And Far Away)" - 5:27
2. "Sure Thing" - 3:22
3. "A Fine Romance" - 2:38
4. "They Didn't Believe Me" - 5:39
5. "All the Things You Are" - 3:52
6. "Whip-Poor-Will" - 4:27
7. "Ol' Man River" - 6:01
8. "Why Do I Love You" - 4:07
9. "Go Little Boat" - 4:03
10. "Put Me to the Test" - 3:31

Tracks 1–5 recorded on February 26, 1959; tracks 6–10 on March 10, 1959

== Personnel ==
- André Previn - piano
- Howard Holzer - sound
- Phil De Lancie - digital remastering (1991 re-release)
