= Sylvia McNair =

American opera singer

- Born: June 23, 1956 (age 70); Mansfield, Ohio, US
- Education: Wheaton College (BMus); Indiana University School of Music (MMus)
- Genres: Classical, Broadway, and jazz
- Occupation: Opera singer
- Instruments: Vocals, violin

Sylvia McNair (born June 23, 1956) is an American opera singer and classical recitalist who has also achieved notable success in the Broadway and cabaret genres. McNair, a soprano, has made several critically acclaimed recordings and has won two Grammy Awards.

== Early life and musical training ==
Sylvia McNair was born in Mansfield, Ohio, the daughter of George and Marilou McNair. She attended and graduated from Lexington High School, just south of Mansfield. As a youth, she studied violin. She originally enrolled in the undergraduate music program at Wheaton College in Illinois as a violin major, but was encouraged by a violin instructor there to study voice as well. She commenced vocal studies at Wheaton with Margarita Evans, and finding herself more suited to singing, discontinued violin as her major. She earned a Bachelor of Music degree in 1978 from Wheaton and subsequently a Master of Music with Distinction in 1983 from Indiana University School of Music (now the Jacobs School of Music), where she studied voice with Virginia MacWatters, John Wustman, and Virginia Zeani.

== Career ==
McNair made her professional concert debut in 1980 with the Indianapolis Symphony Orchestra. Her operatic debut, in 1982, was as Sandrina in Haydn's L'infedeltà delusa with the Mostly Mozart Festival. She appeared regularly at the Vienna State Opera, the Salzburg Festival, Royal Opera House at Covent Garden, the Santa Fe Opera, the San Francisco Opera, and at the Metropolitan Opera, and has soloed with many major European and American orchestras.

Since the late 1990s, McNair has changed the focus of her singing career to Broadway and jazz styles. In these genres she has achieved considerable critical acclaim and commercial success.

From 2006 to 2017, McNair was part of the voice faculty of the Jacobs School of Music at Indiana University, her alma mater. At Indiana University, Sylvia was hired to teach English diction (IPA), and opera workshop. She also had a small studio and taught a few female singers (including soprano Paloma Friedhoff Bello) and one male student (Rafa Campos Salles).

From 2012 to 2017, McNair served as a judge and mentor for the Songbook Academy, a summer intensive for high school students operated by the Great American Songbook Foundation and founded by Michael Feinstein.

== Critical commentary ==
"Her phrasing is exemplary. Her modulations are inspired. Her time is enviable. . . . I could get used to this kind of ecstasy." —Rex Reed, 2005

== Personal ==
McNair married conductor Hal France in 1986. The couple are now divorced.

She was diagnosed with breast cancer in 2006. Her treatments have included mastectomy, chemotherapy and radiation therapy.

In December 2017, McNair came forward as one of several women accusing the famous conductor Charles Dutoit of sexual assault. McNair said that Dutoit "tried to have his way" with her after a March 1985 rehearsal with the Minnesota Orchestra.

== Recorded repertoire ==
Sylvia McNair has made more than 70 recordings, including many complete operas (among them Ilia in Mozart's Idomeneo, re di Creta, Poppea in Monteverdi's L'incoronazione di Poppea, both under the direction of Sir John Eliot Gardiner with the English Baroque Soloists for the ARCHIV label), and Samuel Barber's Knoxville: Summer of 1915. McNair has also recorded a number of recitals, ranging from "Mozart arias" with Sir Neville Marriner and the Academy of St Martin-in-the-Fields to CDs with André Previn of music by Jerome Kern and Harold Arlen (Sure Thing and Come Rain or Come Shine). The Previn collaboration also yielded a CD of Andre's works called From Ordinary Things, including: Four Songs and Two Remembrances with lyrics by Toni Morrison, Vocalise with cellist Yo Yo Ma, and well as the Cello Sonata, again with Yo Yo Ma and the composer at the piano throughout.

== Awards and honors ==
McNair's awards and honors include the following:

- National Metropolitan Opera Auditions, first place, 1982
- Marian Anderson Award, 1990
- Grammy Awards, 1993 and 1996
- Honorary Doctor of Music degrees from Westminster Choir College, 1997, and Indiana University, 1998
- Governor's Award for Outstanding Achievement in Arts and Entertainment from Ohio Governor Bob Taft, 1999
- Command recital performances for Justice Sandra Day O'Connor, Hillary Clinton, Pope John Paul II

== Discography ==
Solo albums

- Mozart: Exsultate Jubilate - Handel, Mozart / Mcnair, Gardiner (Philips, 1993)
- Love's Sweet Surrender (Philips, 1998)
- Rêveries (Philips, 2007)
- Sylvia Mcnair - The Echoing Air (Philips, 2008)
- Peace (2011)
- Romance: A Collection Of Latin Love Songs (Lumusic, 2012)
- Subject to Change! (Harbinger, 2016)

Appears on

- Mozart Great Mass in C minor (Decca, 1987)
- Mozart: Il Re Pastore (Philips, 1991)
- Beethoven: The Symphonies (Philips, 1993)
- Christmas in Leipzig (Dorian Recordings, 1988)
- Brahms: Symphonies Nos. 1-4, Overtures, Ein deutsches Requiem (Warner Classics)
- Berlioz: Béatrice et Bénédict (Erato, 1991)
- Orff: Carmina Burana (Rca, 1992)
- Handel: Messiah (Philips, 1992)
- Music of Samuel Barber (Telarc Digital, 1992)
- Rachmaninoff: Symphony No. 2 - Vocalise (Telarc Digital, 1992)
- Mahler: Symphony No. 4 (Decca, 1993)
- Handel: Semele (Deutsche Grammophon, 1993)
- Gluck: Orfeo ed Euridice (Vienna Version, 1762 - Sung in Italian) (Decca, 1993)
- Rossini: Il Viaggio a Reims (Sony Classical, 1993)
- Mahler: Symphony No. 2 (Decca, 1994)
- Fauré: Requiem (Philips, 1995)
- Purcell: The Fairy Queen (Teldec, 1995)
- Monteverdi: L'Incoronazione di Poppea (Complete) (Archiv Produktion, 1996)
- Britten: A Midsummer Night's Dream, Op. 64 (Philips, 1996)
- Stravinsky: The Rake's Progress (Philips, 1997)
- Ravel: Shéhérazade (Philips, 1998)
- The Faces of Love - The Songs of Jake Heggie (RCA, 1999)
- Tonight - Hits from the Musicals (Philips, 2000)
- The Land Where the Good Songs Go (Harbinger, 2001)
- Grieg: Peer Gynt - Incidental Music (EMI Classics, 2005)
- Haydn: The Creation (Archiv Produktion, 2007)
- Fauré: Requiem; Pavane (Decca, 2008)
- Mozart: Requiem (Decca, 2011)
- Mozart: Le Nozze di Figaro (Deutsche Grammophon, 2011)

With André Previn

- Sure Thing: The Jerome Kern Songbook (Philips, 1994)
- Come Rain or Shine: The Harold Arlen Songbook (Philips, 1996)
- From Ordinary Things; Cello Sonata, Four Songs, Two Remembrances, Vocalise (Sony Masterworks, 1997)
