= André Previn Plays Songs by Harold Arlen =

Studio album by André Previn
- Released: 1960
- Recorded: May 4–5, 1960
- Studio: Contemporary's Studio, Los Angeles
- Genre: Jazz
- Length: 44:41
- Label: Contemporary; M 3586, S 7586
- Producer: Lester Koenig

André Previn chronology
Like Previn! (1960)	André Previn Plays Songs by Harold Arlen (1960)	André Previn and J. J. Johnson (1961)

Professional ratings
Review scores
Source	Rating
The Penguin Guide to Jazz	3.5/4 stars

André Previn Plays Songs by Harold Arlen is a piano solo, jazz album by André Previn. It was intended as a homage to the composer Harold Arlen. It was recorded in May 1960. It was released in 1960 by Contemporary Records as M 3586.

== Track listing ==
All pieces composed by Harold Arlen.

1. "That Old Black Magic" - 4:35
2. "Come Rain or Come Shine" - 4:37
3. "My Shining Hour" - 3:42
4. "Happiness Is a Thing Called Joe" - 4:31
5. "A Sleepin' Bee" - 3:50
6. "Stormy Weather" - 4:59
7. "Over The Rainbow" - 4:23
8. "Let's Fall In Love" - 4:52
9. "For Every Man There's a Woman" - 5:26
10. "Cocoanut Sweet" - 3:40

== Personnel ==
- André Previn - piano
- Phil De Lancie - digital remastering (1991 re-release)
