= West Side Story (André Previn album) =

Studio album by André Previn
- Released: 1959
- Recorded: August 24–25, 1959; Contemporary's Studio, Los Angeles
- Genre: Jazz
- Length: 38:16
- Label: Contemporary; M 3572
- Producer: Lester Koenig

André Previn chronology
André Previn Plays Songs by Jerome Kern (1959)	West Side Story (1959)	The Subterraneans (1960)

Professional ratings
Review scores
Source	Rating
The Penguin Guide to Jazz Recordings	3/4 stars

West Side Story is a jazz album by pianist André Previn and his trio. Previn, along with drummer Shelly Manne and bassist Red Mitchell, chose eight compositions from the original score of the Leonard Bernstein musical West Side Story and re-arranged them in a jazz style.

== Track listing ==
Original music by Leonard Bernstein

1. "Something's Coming" - 2:37
2. "Jet Song" - 4:48
3. "Tonight" - 5:24
4. "I Feel Pretty" - 6:47
5. "Gee, Officer Krupke!" - 4:55
6. "Cool" - 3:21
7. "Maria" - 5:30
8. "America" - 4:51

== Personnel ==
André Previn & His Pals

- André Previn - piano
- Shelly Manne - drums
- Red Mitchell - double-bass
