= Double Play! =

Studio album by Russ Freeman and André Previn
- Released: 1957
- Recorded: April 30 and May 11, 1957
- Studio: Contemporary's Studio, Los Angeles
- Genre: Jazz
- Length: 41:50
- Label: Contemporary
- Producer: Lester Koenig

André Previn chronology
My Fair Lady (1956)	Double Play! (1957)	Pal Joey (1957)

Professional ratings
Review scores
Source	Rating
AllMusic	4/5 stars
The Penguin Guide to Jazz	3/4 stars

Double Play! is a 1957 jazz album featuring pianists Russ Freeman and André Previn.

It was recorded and released in 1957 on the Contemporary label, and re-released in 1993 in the Original Jazz Classics series.

Together with drummer Shelly Manne, the album, as its title suggests, includes eight baseball-themed original compositions by Freeman and Previn along with the standard "Take Me Out to the Ball Game". (The rather risque-by-1950s-standards album cover features a model wearing a Hollywood Stars cap.) The album was advertised at the time as the first time that two pianists recorded "modern jazz" together.

The Penguin Guide to Jazz suggested that the album was the best of Previn's early releases, being "the most uncomplicatedly jazz-driven".

== Track listing ==
1. "Take Me Out to the Ball Game" (Jack Norworth, Albert Von Tilzer)
2. "Who's on First?" (Previn) - 3:37
3. "Called on Account of Rain" (Previn) - 5:11
4. "In the Cellar Blues" (Previn, Freeman) - 5:01
5. "Batter Up" (Freeman) - 3:58
6. "Double Play" (Freeman) - 4:58
7. "Safe at Home" (Freeman) - 6:03
8. "Fungo" (Freeman) - 5:42
9. "Strike Out the Band" (Previn) - 4:12

Track 1–5 recorded on April 30, 1957; tracks 6–9 on May 11, 1957

== Personnel ==
- Russ Freeman - piano
- André Previn - piano
- Shelly Manne - drums
