= André Previn =

American musician (1929–2019)

André Previn KBE
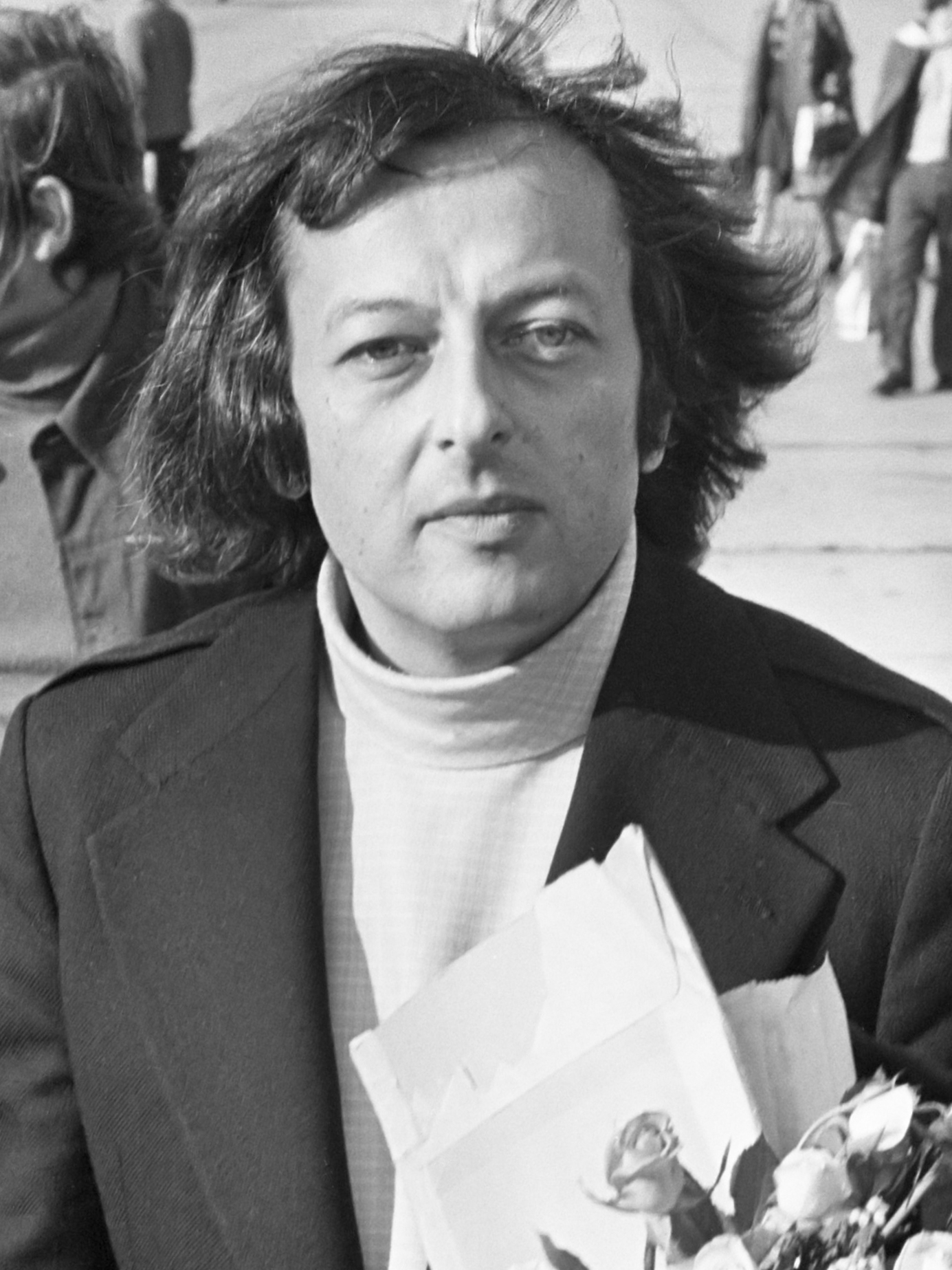
- Previn in 1973
- Born: Andreas Ludwig Priwin; April 6, 1929; Berlin, Germany
- Died: February 28, 2019 (aged 89); New York City, U.S.
- Occupations: Pianist; composer; conductor; arranger; music director
- Years active: 1943–2019
- Organizations: London Symphony Orchestra; Pittsburgh Symphony; Los Angeles Philharmonic; Royal Philharmonic; Oslo Philharmonic
- Spouses: Betty Bennett (m. 1952; div. 1957) Dory Langan (m. 1959; div. 1970) Mia Farrow (m. 1970; div. 1979) Heather Hales (m. 1982; div. 1999) Anne-Sophie Mutter (m. 2002; div. 2006)
- Children: 10, including Claudia, Alicia, & Soon-Yi (Note: 6 biological & 4 adopted)
- Musical career
- Labels: Contemporary; EMI; RCA; Decca; Philips; Deutsche Grammophon; Telarc

André George Previn (/ˈprɛvɪn/ PREH-vin; born Andreas Ludwig Priwin; April 6, 1929 – February 28, 2019) was a German and American conductor, composer, and pianist. His career had three facets: Hollywood films, jazz, and classical music. In each he achieved success, and the latter two were part of his life until the end. In movies, he arranged and composed music. In jazz, he was a celebrated pianist, accompanist to singers, and interpreter of songs from the "Great American Songbook". In classical music, he also performed as a pianist but gained television fame as a conductor, and during his last thirty years created his legacy as a composer.

Before the age of twenty, Previn began arranging and composing for Metro-Goldwyn-Mayer. He would go on to be involved in the music of more than fifty films and would win four Academy Awards. He won ten Grammy Awards, for recordings in all three areas of his career, and then one more, for lifetime achievement. He served as music director of the Houston Symphony Orchestra (1967–1969), principal conductor of the London Symphony Orchestra (1968–1979), music director of the Pittsburgh Symphony Orchestra (1976–1984), of the Los Angeles Philharmonic (1985–1989), chief conductor of the Royal Philharmonic (1985–1992), and, after a break from salaried posts, chief conductor of the Oslo Philharmonic (2002–2006). He also regularly conducted the Vienna Philharmonic.

== Early life ==
Previn was born in Berlin to a German-Jewish family, the second son and last of three children of Charlotte (née Epstein) and Jack Previn, who was a lawyer, judge, and music teacher born in Graudenz, then in Germany but now in Poland. The eldest son, Steve Previn, became a film director. The year of Previn's birth is disputed. Whereas most published reports give 1929, Previn himself stated that 1930 was his birth year. All three children received piano lessons and Previn was the one who enjoyed them from the start and displayed the most talent. At six, he enrolled at the Berlin Conservatory. In 1938, Previn's father was told that his son was no longer welcome at the conservatory, despite André receiving a full scholarship in recognition of his abilities, on the grounds that he was Jewish.

In 1938, the family had applied for American visas and during the nine-month wait to obtain them, left Berlin for Paris. Previn's father enrolled his son into the Conservatoire de Paris where André learned music theory. On October 20, 1938, the family left Paris and sailed to New York City. Their journey continued to Los Angeles, arriving on November 26. His father's second cousin Charles Previn was music director for Universal Studios. Previn became a naturalized US citizen in 1943. He learned English, which was his third language after German and French, through comic books and other reading materials with a dictionary, and watching films. In 1946 he graduated from Beverly Hills High School and performed with Richard M. Sherman at the ceremony; Previn played the piano, accompanying Sherman, who played the flute.

== In the film studios ==
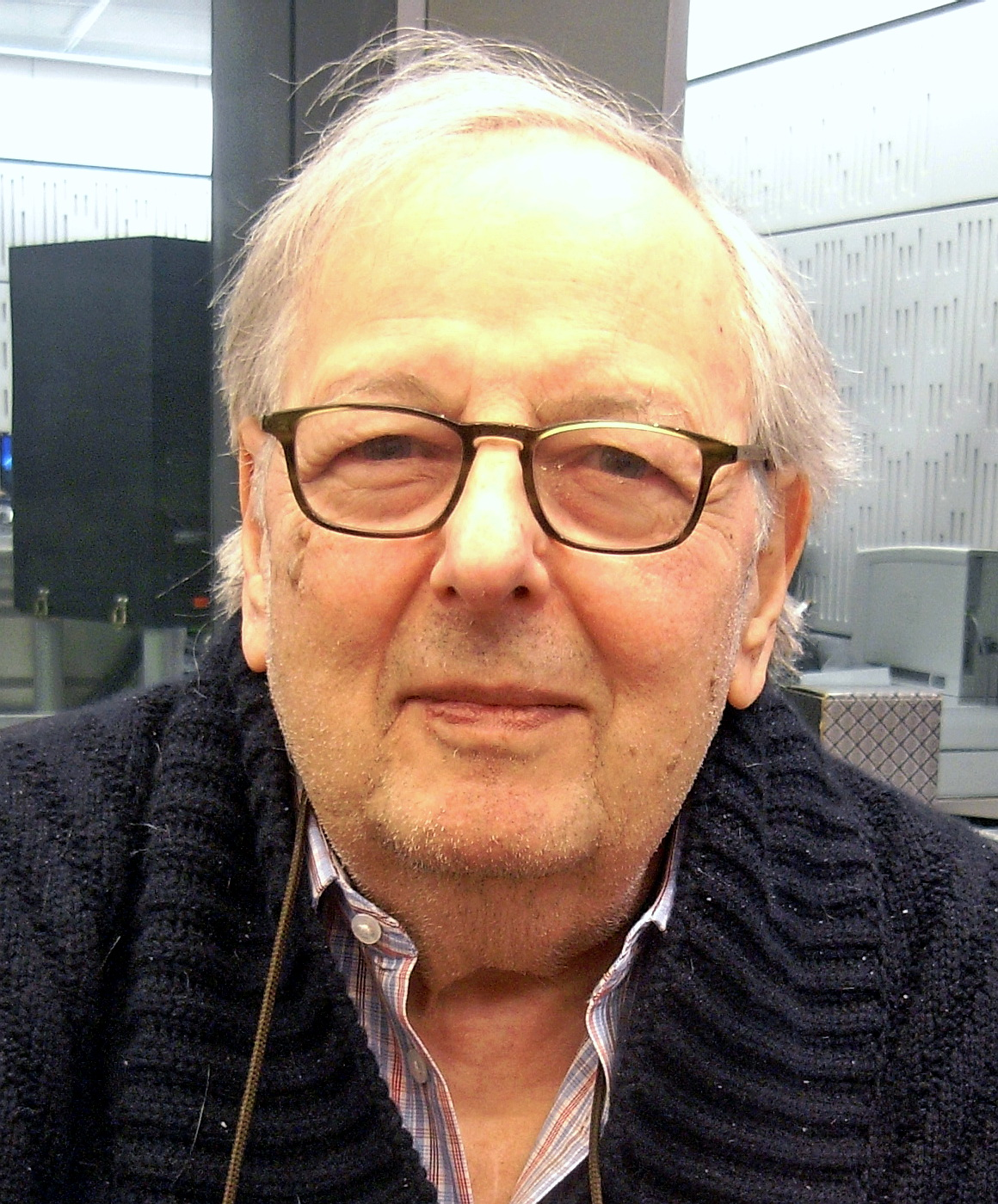
Previn in 2012

Previn was involved in creating the music for more than 50 films and won four Academy Awards for his work.

Previn's career as a composer, conductor, and arranger at Metro-Goldwyn-Mayer studios (MGM) began in 1946, while he was still in high school, after their music department noticed his work for a local radio program and hired him. Previn recalled that MGM was "looking for somebody who was talented, fast, and cheap and, because I was a kid, I was all three. So they hired me to do piecework and I evidently did it very well." His first official credit was for an entry in the Lassie series, The Sun Comes Up (1949), which much later he thought was "the most inept score you ever heard" after seeing a television rerun.

While a full-time employee at MGM in 1950, Previn was drafted into the military. Beginning in 1951, while stationed with the Sixth Army Band at the Presidio of San Francisco, Previn took private conducting lessons for two years from Pierre Monteux, then conductor of the San Francisco Symphony Orchestra, lessons which Previn valued highly. In 1953, Previn returned to Hollywood and focused his attention on film scores and jazz. Previn stayed at MGM for 16 years, but despite the secure job and good pay, he had come to feel increasingly confined, and consequently desired to pursue classical music outside of film scores. He resigned from MGM at 32, wanting "to gamble with whatever talent I might have had".

His break with the film world in the 1960s, however, was not as complete and thorough as he would later claim. During this period, Previn won a 1964 Academy Award for My Fair Lady. His film work continued until 1975's Rollerball. Over his multi-decade film career, Previn was involved in the music of more than 50 movies as composer, conductor, and/or performer.

== In jazz ==
Previn described himself as a musician who played jazz, rather than a jazz musician. Nevertheless, he proved to be a gifted jazz-piano interpreter and arranger of songs from the "Great American Songbook", winning the respect of prominent dedicated jazz artists. He separately worked as piano-accompanist to singers of jazz standards, from Ella Fitzgerald to Doris Day, recording prolifically. Like Oscar Peterson, whom he admired tremendously, and Bill Evans, he worked often as a trio pianist, usually with bass and drums, collaborating with dozens of famed jazz instrumentalists. Previn also memorably filmed TV shows with Peterson (1974) and Fitzgerald (1979). Jazz critic and historian Ted Gioia wrote in his book about West Coast jazz, the scene to which Previn belonged:

[His] projects varied greatly in terms of quality and jazz content, but at his best Previn could be a persuasive, moving jazz musician. [...] Despite his deep roots in symphonic music, Previn largely steered clear of Third Stream classicism in his jazz work, aiming more at an earthy, hard-swinging piano style at times reminiscent of Horace Silver. Long before his eventual retreat from his jazz work, Previn had become something of a popularizer of jazz rather than a serious practitioner of the music. At his best, however, his music reflected a strong indigenous feel for the jazz idiom.

Dizzy Gillespie on Previn, said:

He has the flow, you know, which a lot of guys don't have and won't ever get. Yeah. I heard him play and I knew. A lot of guys, they have the technique, the harmonic sense. They've got the perfect coordination. And, yeah, all that's necessary. But you need something more, you know? Even if you only make an oooooooo, like that, you got to have the flow.

== As a conductor and composer of classical music ==
=== As conductor ===
He was music director of the Houston Symphony Orchestra, the Pittsburgh Symphony Orchestra, the Los Angeles Philharmonic, and the Oslo Philharmonic, as well as the principal conductor of the London Symphony Orchestra and the Royal Philharmonic Orchestra.

In 1967, Previn succeeded Sir John Barbirolli as music director of the Houston Symphony Orchestra. In 1968, he began his tenure as principal conductor of the London Symphony Orchestra (LSO), serving in that post until 1979. During his LSO tenure, he and the LSO appeared on the BBC Television programme André Previn's Music Night. From 1975 to 1985, he was music director of the Pittsburgh Symphony Orchestra (PSO) and, in turn, had another television series with the PSO titled Previn and the Pittsburgh. He was then principal conductor of the Royal Philharmonic Orchestra from 1985 to 1991.

In 1985, he became music director of the Los Angeles Philharmonic. Although Previn's tenure with the orchestra was deemed satisfactory from a professional perspective, other conductors, including Kurt Sanderling, Simon Rattle, and Esa-Pekka Salonen, did a better job at selling out concerts. Previn clashed frequently with Ernest Fleischmann (the LAPO's executive VP and general manager), including the dispute when Fleischmann failed to consult Previn before naming Salonen as principal guest conductor of the orchestra, complete with a tour of Japan. As a result of Previn's objections, Salonen's title and Japanese tour were withdrawn; however, shortly thereafter, in April 1989, Previn resigned. Four months later, Salonen was named Music Director Designate of the Los Angeles Philharmonic, officially taking the post of music director in October 1992.

Previn was music director of the Oslo Philharmonic from 2002 to 2006, and in 2009 he was appointed principal guest conductor of Tokyo's NHK Symphony Orchestra.

=== As a composer ===
André Previn left two concert overtures, several tone poems, 14 concerti, a symphony for strings, incidental music to a British play; a varied body of chamber music (six violin sonatas, other scores for violin and piano; sonatas for bassoon, cello, clarinet, flute and oboe, each with piano; a waltz for two oboes and piano, three other trios, a string quartet with soprano, a clarinet quintet, a quintet for horn and strings, a nonet, an Octet for Eleven (for eleven players), and three works for brass ensemble); several works for solo piano; dozens of songs (in English and German); a monodrama for soprano, string quartet and piano (Penelope, completed just before he died); a musical each for New York and London (Coco and The Good Companions); and two successful operas.

== Television ==
In his capacity as conductor, mainly, Previn enjoyed a long relationship with the medium of television. He featured in Meet André Previn (1969) on London Weekend Television, in the Morecambe and Wise Christmas Show in 1971 and 1972 (BBC), André Previn's Music Night (with the London Symphony Orchestra; three programmes in 1973, others in 1975 and 1976), and television interviews with other musicians. He made appearances on Call My Bluff and participated in documentaries about popular music and jazz during the 1970s and 1980s. In the United Kingdom he worked on TV with the London Symphony Orchestra. In the U.S. the television program Previn and the Pittsburgh (1977) featured him in collaboration with the Pittsburgh Symphony Orchestra.

=== "Andrew Preview" ===
British TV audiences witnessed his comic acting skills when he was introduced as "Mr Andrew Preview" (or "Privet") on the Morecambe and Wise Christmas Show in 1971. This involved his conducting a performance of Edvard Grieg's Piano Concerto with Eric Morecambe as the inept soloist, having been tricked into doing it by being told that Yehudi Menuhin would be his solo violinist. Playing the comedy straight, the annoyed Previn then remarks: "I'll go get my baton. It's in Chicago." His comic timing made Morecambe immediately realise the sketch would be a success. Later in the sketch Previn accuses Morecambe of playing "all the wrong notes"; Morecambe grits his teeth, grabs Previn by the lapels, and retorts that he has been playing "all the right notes, but not necessarily in the right order".

Previn recalled in 2005 that people in Britain still remember the sketch years later: "Taxi drivers still call me Mr Preview". He later said he was happy that the sketch meant as much to everyone else as it did to him, and that several parts of it were (uncharacteristically for Morecambe and Wise) improvised.

Previn later appeared in the 1972 special as a bus conductor in a feature called "I worked with Morecambe and Wise and look what happened to me". He made a further appearance in their eighth series. In this sketch, he is tricked into visiting the pair again, and they suggest that if he works with them again, he could receive a knighthood; he conducts a 1920s-style dance band as the pair sing, then meets them on stage and, after a lady in the audience greets him as "Mr Preview", tells the pair: "That's not the Queen, that's Mrs Mills!" Finally, he joins the pair at the end of the episode in singing "Bring Me Sunshine".

=== Mozart on Tour ===
Previn was host and narrator of the 13-part 1991 documentary series Mozart on Tour, which focused on Wolfgang Amadeus Mozart's travels and how his music developed through them. He also performed and conducted Mozart's Piano Concerto No. 24 in C minor, K. 491, with the Royal Philharmonic Orchestra in one episode of the series, and in another episode conducted the Royal Philharmonic Orchestra in a performance by Aleksandar Madžar of Mozart's Piano Concerto No. 27 in B-flat major, K. 595.

=== The Kindness of Strangers ===
Previn was the subject of a two-hour film by Tony Palmer titled The Kindness of Strangers – after the closing words of his opera then in production, in 1998 – which followed Previn for a year at engagements around the world, and included interviews with Previn and rehearsals for the opera. The film was issued on DVD in 2009 by Voiceprint Records; an earlier issue had cut 30 minutes from it. In 2022, it was released on Youtube, on Palmer's official channel.

== Personal life ==
Previn was married five times. His first marriage, in 1952, was to jazz singer Betty Bennett, with whom he had two daughters, Claudia Previn Stasny and Alicia Previn. Previn divorced Bennett in 1957, a few months before she gave birth to Alicia.

In 1959, he married Dory Langan. A singer-songwriter, she became widely known as a lyricist with whom Previn collaborated on several Academy Award–nominated film scores during their marriage. They separated in 1968 once she found out about his affair with Mia Farrow, a family friend, which had resulted in a pregnancy. Distressed at his infidelity, Dory was hospitalized for a mental breakdown. Known professionally as Dory Previn, she resumed her career as a singer-songwriter. Her first album was On My Way to Where (1970), a critically acclaimed work whose confessional lyrics were described as "searingly honest"; it chronicled both her mental health struggles and the infidelity that she alleged had at once precipitated the end of her marriage to Previn and exacerbated her intermittent mental illness. In 2013, jazz singer Kate Dimbleby and pianist Naadia Sheriff revisited Dory Previn's musical reflections on her marriage to Previn in the London cabaret show Beware of Young Girls: The Dory Previn Story.

Previn's third marriage, in 1970, was to Mia Farrow. Previn and Farrow had three biological children together — fraternal twins Matthew and Sascha, born before Previn and Farrow were married, and Fletcher, born in 1974. They then adopted Vietnamese infants Lark Song and Summer "Daisy" Song (born October 6, 1974), followed by Soon-Yi Previn, a Korean child whose age a physician's bone scan placed between six and eight years old and whose unknown birth date her adoptive parents estimated as October 8, 1970. Previn and Farrow divorced in 1979. Lark died on Christmas Day 2008, aged 35; reports at the time suggested she had died of AIDS-related pneumonia. In the aftermath of the scandal involving Soon-Yi and Mia Farrow's partner Woody Allen, Previn said of Soon-Yi, "She does not exist."

Previn's longest marriage was his fourth. In January 1982, he married Heather Sneddon. They had a son, Lucas Alexander, and an adopted daughter, Li-An Mary. Previn wrote a brief memoir of his early years in Hollywood, No Minor Chords, which was published in 1991, edited by Jacqueline Kennedy Onassis and dedicated to Heather. This marriage ended in divorce after 17 years.

His fifth marriage, in 2002, was to the German violinist Anne-Sophie Mutter, for whom in the previous year he had composed his Violin Concerto. They announced their divorce in August 2006, but continued to work together in concerts afterwards.

== Honors and awards ==
Previn was nominated for 11 Academy Awards. He won four times, in 1958, 1959, 1963 and 1964. He is one of the few composers to have accomplished the feat of winning back-to-back Oscars, and one of only two to have done so on two occasions. Previn was the first person in the history of the Academy Awards to receive three nominations in one year (for the 1960 awards).

In 1970 he was nominated for a Tony Award as part of Coco's nomination for Best Musical. In 1974, he composed the musical score for The Good Companions starring John Mills in London. In 1977 he became an honorary member of the Royal Academy of Music. The 1977 television show Previn and the Pittsburgh was nominated for three Emmy awards.

Previn was appointed an honorary Knight Commander of the Order of the British Empire in 1996. (Not being a citizen of a Commonwealth realm, he was permitted to use the post-nominal letters KBE but was not styled "Sir André".) Previn received the Kennedy Center Honors in 1998 in recognition of his contributions to classical music and opera in the United States. In 2005 he was awarded the international Glenn Gould Prize and in 2008 won Gramophone magazine's Lifetime Achievement Award for his work in classical, film, and jazz music. In 2010, the Recording Academy honored Previn with a Lifetime Achievement Grammy.

== Death ==
Previn died on February 28, 2019, at home in Manhattan at the age of 89.

== Recordings ==
Previn's discography contains hundreds of recordings in film, jazz, classical music, theatre, and contemporary classical music. Because of the huge number of recordings, the following lists are necessarily highly selective. A full discography (including LP/CD record codes) is available in Frédéric Döhl: André Previn. Musikalische Vielseitigkeit und ästhetische Erfahrung, Stuttgart 2012, pp. 295–319.

=== Film music ===
Most of the films which incorporate Previn's music are still available as videos/DVDs and/or as soundtrack records. Some of his soundtracks have been reissued in recent years, including those from Elmer Gantry, Four Horsemen of the Apocalypse, Inside Daisy Clover, and Dead Ringer.

=== Jazz recordings ===
Previn made dozens of jazz recordings, as both leader and sideman, primarily during two periods: from 1945 to 1967, and from 1989 to 2001, with just a handful of recordings in between or afterward. He also did crossover recordings with such classical singers as Eileen Farrell, Leontyne Price and Kiri Te Kanawa, as well as several easy-listening records with piano and orchestra in the 1960s (beginning with Like Young: Secret Songs for Young Lovers, 1959, with David Rose and His Orchestra).

Following his performance on Shelly Manne's recording Modern Jazz Performances of Songs from My Fair Lady in 1956, Previn released several albums of jazz interpretations of songs from broadway musicals as well as several solo piano recordings focused on the songbooks of popular composers (André Previn Plays Songs by Vernon Duke, 1958; André Previn Plays Songs by Harold Arlen, 1960; Ballads. Solo Jazz Standards, 1996; Alone: Ballads for Solo Piano, 2007), the late recording of songs by Harold Arlen with singer Sylvia McNair and bass player David Finck (Come Rain or Shine: The Harold Arlen Songbook, 1996), and his TV shows with Oscar Peterson (1974) – which Marlon Brando called "one of the greatest hours I ever saw on television" – and Ella Fitzgerald (1979) respectively.

==== Jazz recordings as leader/co-leader ====
- André Previn Plays Harry Warren (RCA Victor, 1952)
- Collaboration (RCA Victor, 1955) – with Shorty Rogers
- Let's Get Away from It All (André Previn album)|Let's Get Away from It All (Decca, 1955)
- Double Play! (Contemporary, 1957) with Russ Freeman
- Pal Joey (Contemporary, 1957)
- Gigi (Contemporary, 1958)
- André Previn Plays Songs by Vernon Duke (Contemporary, 1958)
- Secret Songs For Young Lovers (MGM Records, 1958, with David Rose)
- King Size! (Contemporary, 1959)
- André Previn Plays Songs by Jerome Kern (Contemporary, 1959)
- Somebody Loves Me (Capitol, 1959)
- West Side Story (Contemporary, 1959)
- Like Blue (MGM Records, 1960)
- The Subterraneans (soundtrack) (MGM, 1960)
- Like Previn! (Contemporary, 1960)
- André Previn Plays Songs by Harold Arlen (Contemporary, 1960)
- A Touch of Elegance (Columbia, 1960)
- Like Love (Columbia, 1960)
- Dinah Sings, Previn Plays (Capitol, 1960)
- Diahann Carroll / The André Previn Trio (United Artists Records, 1960)
- Thinking of You (Columbia, 1961)
- The Previn Scene (MGM Records, 1961)
- Duet (Columbia, 1962, with Doris Day)
- André Previn and J. J. Johnson Play Kurt Weill's Mack The Knife & Bilbao-Song (Columbia, 1962, with J. J. Johnson)
- 4 to Go! (Columbia, 1963) with Herb Ellis, Ray Brown and Shelly Manne
- But Beautiful (André Previn album)|But Beautiful (Decca, 1963)
- Soft and Swinging the Music of Jimmy McHugh (Columbia, 1964)
- Sound Stage! (Columbia, 1964)
- Love Walked In (RCA Camden, 1964)
- The Popular Previn (Columbia, 1965)
- André Previn Plays Music of the Young Hollywood Composers (RCA Victor, 1965)
- Previn with Voices (RCA Victor, 1966)
- All Alone (RCA Victor, 1967)
- Right As the Rain (RCA Victor, 1967, with Leontyne Price)
- The Easy Winners (Angel Records, 1975, with Itzhak Perlman)
- A Different Kind of Blues (EMI/Angel, 1980, with Itzhak Perlman)
- It's a Breeze (EMI/Angel, 1981, with Itzhak Perlman)
- Nice Work if You Can Get It (1983, with Ella Fitzgerald and Niels-Henning Ørsted Pedersen)
- After Hours (Telarc, 1989, with Joe Pass and Ray Brown)
- Uptown (Telarc, 1990, with Mundell Lowe and Ray Brown)
- Old Friends (Telarc, 1992, with Mundell Lowe and Ray Brown)
- Kiri Sidetracks: The Jazz Album (1992, with Kiri Te Kanawa, Mundell Lowe and Ray Brown)
- What Headphones? (Angel, 1993)
- Sure Thing: The Jerome Kern Songbook (1994, with Sylvia McNair and David Finck)
- André Previn and Friends Play Show Boat (Deutsche Grammophon, 1995, with Mundell Lowe, Ray Brown and Grady Tate)
- Ballads: Solo Jazz Standards (Angel, 1996)
- Come Rain or Shine: The Harold Arlen Songbook (1996, with Sylvia McNair and David Finck)
- Jazz at the Musikverein (Verve, 1997, with Mundell Lowe and Ray Brown)
- We Got Rhythm: A Gershwin Songbook (Deutsche Grammophon, 1998, with David Finck)
- We Got It Good and That Ain't Bad: An Ellington Songbook (Deutsche Grammophon, 1999, with David Finck)
- Live at the Jazz Standard (Decca, 2001, with David Finck)
- Alone: Ballads for Solo Piano (Decca, 2007)

==== Jazz recordings as sideman/group member ====
with Buddy Bregman

- Swinging Kicks (Verve, 1957)

with Benny Carter

- Jazz Giant (Contemporary, 1958)

with Michael Feinstein

- Change of Heart: The Songs of Andre Previn (Telarc, 2013)

with Helen Humes

- Tain't Nobody's Biz-ness if I Do (Contemporary, 1959) OCLC 28100012
- Songs I Like to Sing! (Contemporary, 1960) OCLC 658586296

with Barney Kessel

- Music to Listen to Barney Kessel By (Contemporary, 1956)
- Carmen (Contemporary, 1959)

with Shelly Manne

- Shelly Manne & His Friends (Contemporary, 1956)
- My Fair Lady (Contemporary, 1956)
- Li'l Abner (Contemporary, 1957)
- Bells Are Ringing (Contemporary, 1959)

with The Mitchells: Red Mitchell, Whitey Mitchell and Blue Mitchell

- Get Those Elephants Out'a Here (MetroJazz, 1958)

with Lyle Murphy

- Twelve-Tone Compositions and Arrangements by Lyle Murphy (Contemporary, 1955)

with Pete Rugolo

- An Adventure in Sound: Reeds in Hi-Fi (Mercury, 1956 [1958]) OCLC 12855653
- An Adventure in Sound: Brass in Hi-Fi (Mercury 1956 [1958]) OCLC 793508083
- Percussion at Work (EmArcy, 1957) OCLC 48895568

=== Classical music ===
==== Orchestral music ====
Previn's recorded repertory as a conductor focused on standards of the Classical, Romantic and Modern eras. In opera, however, he recorded only Der Schauspieldirektor, Die Fledermaus, and Ravel's two short operas, as well as his own A Streetcar Named Desire.

He favored the symphonic music of Berlioz, Brahms and Strauss, and placed a special emphasis on violin and piano concertos and on ballets. Only a few of his recordings were of music before Haydn and Mozart (both favourites on his programmes) or of atonal or serial avant-garde pieces. In 20th-century music his repertory highlit specific composers of late Romanticism and Modernism: Barber, Britten, Gershwin, Korngold, Prokofiev, Rachmaninoff, Ravel, Shostakovich, Strauss, Vaughan Williams, Walton and Shapero. Previn recorded for RCA, EMI, Telarc and Deutsche Grammophon.

Noteworthy as interpretations, for various reasons, are his recordings of Shostakovich's Fifth Symphony (for RCA in 1965), Walton's First Symphony (1966), the Vaughan Williams symphonies (1967–72), Rachmaninoff's Second Symphony (for EMI in 1970), Rachmaninoff's piano concertos (for Decca in 1970–71, with Vladimir Ashkenazy), Walton's Belshazzar's Feast (EMI, 1972), Orff's Carmina Burana (1974) and Mendelssohn's A Midsummer Night's Dream (1976), all with the London Symphony Orchestra; and Strauss's horn concertos (for DG in 1996), with the Vienna Philharmonic.

==== Chamber music and solo piano ====
- Samuel Barber: Four Excursions, Paul Hindemith: Piano Sonata No. 3, Frank Martin: Prelude No. 7 (1961) OCLC 6051005, 6050975, 6050950
- Gabriel Fauré: Piano Trio in D minor op. 120, Felix Mendelssohn: Piano Trio in D minor op. 49 (1964, with Nathan Roth and Joseph Schuster) OCLC 42049799
- Sergei Rachmaninoff: Music for Two Pianos. Suite Nr. 1 op. 5, Suite Nr. 2 op. 17, Symphonic Dances op. 45 (1974, with Vladimir Ashkenazy) OCLC 34436597
- Maurice Ravel: Piano Trio in A minor, Dmitri Shostakovich: Piano Trio No. 2 in E minor op. 67 (1974, with Kim Young Uck and Ralph Kirshbaum) OCLC 956595804
- Claude Debussy: Piano Trio in G major, Maurice Ravel: Piano Trio in A minor (1995, with Julie Rosenfeld and Gary Hoffmann) OCLC 33353449
- Ludwig van Beethoven: Piano Trio No. 7 in B-flat major op. 97, Johannes Brahms: Piano Trio in B major op. 8 (1995, with Viktoria Mullova and Heinrich Schiff) OCLC 725305569, 760120895
- American Scenes. André Previn: Sonata for Violin and Piano "Vineyard", George Gershwin: Three Preludes, Aaron Copland: Sonata for Violin and Piano, Nocturne, Samuel Barber: Canzone (Elegy) op. 38a (1998, with Gil Shaham) OCLC 610630921

==== His own compositions ====
- Guitar Concerto (1972, with John Williams and the London Symphony Orchestra) OCLC 18200389
- Every Good Boy Deserves Favour (1978, with the London Symphony Orchestra) OCLC 1051570863
- Piano Concerto and Guitar Concerto (1990, with Vladimir Ashkenazy, Eduardo Fernandez and the Royal Philharmonic Orchestra) OCLC 25048167
- Honey and Rue (1995, with Kathleen Battle and the Orchestra of St. Luke's) OCLC 1015587270
- "From Ordinary Things": Sonata for Cello and Piano; Four Songs for Soprano, Cello and Piano; Two Remembrances for Soprano, Alto Flute and Piano; Vocalise for Soprano, Cello and Piano (1997, with Sylvia McNair, Yo-Yo Ma and Sandra Church) OCLC 664702000
- Trio for Piano, Oboe and Bassoon (1997, with Cynthia Koledo de Almeida and Nancy Goeres) OCLC 36578670
- "Music of André Previn": Trio for Piano, Oboe and Bassoon, Peaches for Flute and Piano, Triolet for Brass, Variations on a Theme by Haydn for Piano, A Wedding Waltz for Two Oboes and Piano (1998, with the St. Luke's Chamber Ensemble) OCLC 39802171
- "American Scenes": Sonata for Violin and Piano "Vineyard" (1998, with Gil Shaham) OCLC 610630921
- A Streetcar Named Desire (1998; with Renée Fleming, Elizabeth Futral, Rodney Gilfry, Anthony Dean Griffey, San Francisco Opera Orchestra) OCLC 40677304
- "Diversions – Songs": Diversions; Sallie Chisum Remembers Billy the Kid; Vocalise; The Giraffes Go to Hamburg; Three Dickinson Songs (2001, with Renée Fleming, Barbara Bonney, Moray Welsh, Vienna Philharmonic, London Symphony Orchestra) OCLC 883991342
- Tango Song and Dance (2003, Anne-Sophie Mutter) OCLC 658792388
- Violin Concerto "Anne-Sophie" (2003, with Anne-Sophie Mutter and the Boston Symphony Orchestra) OCLC 941807870
- Double Concerto for Violin, Contrabass and Orchestra; Piano Concerto; Violin Concerto "Anne-Sophie"; Three Dickinson Songs; Diversions; "I Can Smell The Sea Air" from A Streetcar Named Desire (2009, with Renée Fleming, Anne-Sophie Mutter, Vladimir Ashkenazy, Roman Patkolo, Boston Symphony Orchestra, London Symphony Orchestra, Vienna Philharmonic, San Francisco Opera Orchestra) OCLC 311799824
- Brief Encounter (2011, with Elizabeth Futral, Nathan Gunn, Kim Josephson, Houston Grand Opera Orchestra, Patrick Summers) OCLC 713210831

== List of awards ==
=== Academy Awards ===
Music (Scoring of a Musical Picture)

- 1958 Gigi (orig. music: Loewe)
- 1959 Porgy and Bess (orig. music: Gershwin)

Music (Scoring of Music--adaptation or treatment)

- 1963 Irma la Douce (orig. music: Monnot)
- 1964 My Fair Lady (orig. music: Loewe)

=== Grammy Awards ===
Previn received Grammy Awards and nominations:

Grammy Lifetime Achievement Award

- 2010 André Previn

Best Instrumental Soloist

- 2005 Previn: Violin Concerto; Bernstein: Serenade

Best Classical Crossover Album

- 2003 Korngold: The Sea Hawk, Captain Blood with the London Symphony Orchestra

Best Chamber Music Performance

- 1999 American Scenes: Copland, Previn, Barber, Gershwin

Best Choral Performance

- 1974 Walton: Belshazzar's Feast with the London Symphony Chorus & Orchestra
- 1977 Rachmaninoff: Kolokola with the London Symphony Chorus & Orchestra

Best Performance by an Orchestra

- 1960 Like Young with the David Rose Orchestra

Best Sound Track Album

- 1959 Gigi (orig. music: Loewe)
- 1960 Porgy and Bess (orig. music: Gershwin)

Best Jazz Performance – Soloist or Small Group

- 1961 West Side Story (orig. music: Bernstein)
- 1962 André Previn Plays Songs by Harold Arlen
