= Bud Shank discography =

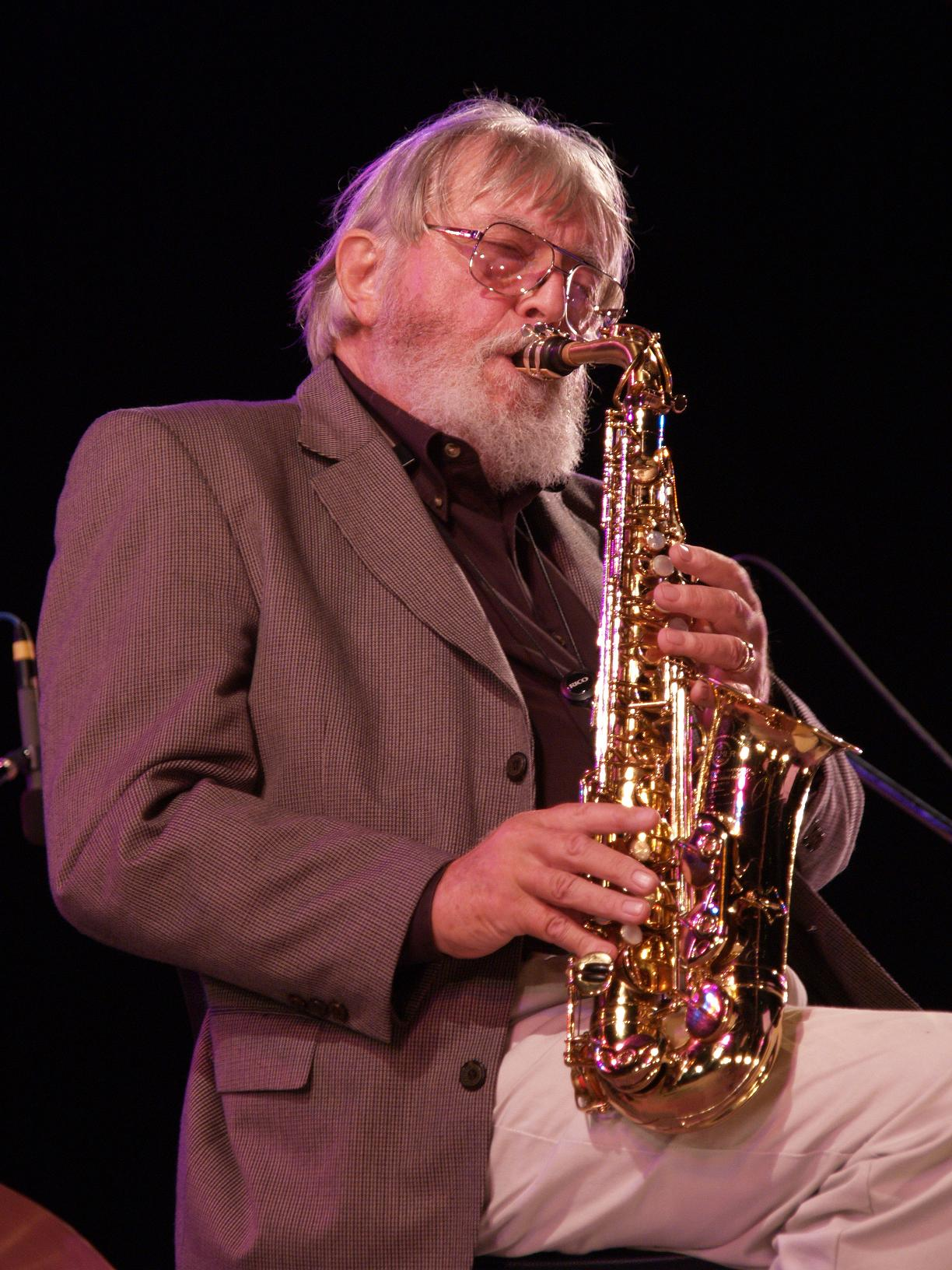
Bud Shank performing in 2006

Clifford Everett "Bud" Shank, Jr. (May 27, 1926 – April 2, 2009) was an American alto saxophonist and flautist. He had an extensive career, releasing albums in seven different decades.

== As leader ==
- 1954 Compositions of Shorty Rogers (Nocturne 2)
- 1954 Bud Shank and Three Trombones (Pacific Jazz 14)
- 1955 Bud Shank and Bob Brookmeyer (Pacific Jazz 20)
- 1955 Bud Shank – Shorty Rogers – Bill Perkins (Pacific Jazz 1205)
- 1956 Strings & Trombones (subtitled The Saxophone Artistry of Bud Shank) (Pacific Jazz 1213) reissue of Pacific Jazz 14 and Pacific Jazz 20
- 1956 The Bud Shank Quartet (Pacific Jazz 1215) – with Claude Williamson
- 1956 Jazz at Cal-Tech (Pacific Jazz 1219) – with Bob Cooper
- 1956 Flute 'n Oboe (Pacific Jazz 1226) – with Bob Cooper
- 1956 Bud Shank Quartet Featuring Claude Williamson (Pacific Jazz 1230)
- 1956 Live at the Haig (Choice/Bainbridge 6830; Candid) [released 1985]
- 1957 Theme Music from "The James Dean Story" (World Pacific 2005)
- 1958 Jazz Swings Broadway (World Pacific 404)
- 1958 The Swing's to TV (World Pacific 411) – with Bob Cooper
- 1958 Bud Shank in Africa (Pacific Jazz 5000)
- 1958 Misty Eyes (West Wind) reissue of Pacific Jazz 5000
- 1958 I'll Take Romance (World Pacific 1251)
- 1959 Holiday in Brazil (World Pacific 1259)
- 1959 Slippery When Wet (World Pacific 1265)
- 1959 Blowin' Country (World Pacific 1277) – with Bob Cooper
- 1959 Latin Contrasts (World Pacific 1281)
- 1960 Flute 'n Alto (World Pacific 1286)
- 1960 Koto & Flute (World Pacific 1299) – with Kimio Eto
- 1960 Bud Shank Plays Tenor (Pacific Jazz 4)
- 1961 New Groove (Pacific Jazz 21) – with Carmell Jones
- 1961 Barefoot Adventure (Pacific Jazz 35) – with Carmell Jones and Bob Cooper
- 1962 Swinging Soundtrack (Kimberly 2016) reissue of World Pacific 2005
- 1962 Improvisations (World Pacific 1416; Angel) – with Ravi Shankar
- 1962 Bossa Nova Jazz Samba (Pacific Jazz 58) – with Clare Fischer
- 1963 Brasamba! (Pacific Jazz 64) – with Clare Fischer and Joe Pass
- 1963 Swinging Broadway!! (Kimberly 2024) reissue of World Pacific 404
- 1963 The Talents of Bud Shank (Kimberly 2025) compilation of Nocturne 2 and Pacific Jazz 14
- 1965 Folk 'n Flute (World Pacific 1819)
- 1965 Bud Shank & His Brazilian Friends (Pacific Jazz 89)
- 1966 Bud Shank & the Sax Section (Pacific Jazz 10110)
- 1966 Flute, Oboe and Strings (World Pacific 1827) – with Bob Cooper
- 1966 Michelle (World Pacific 1840)
- 1966 California Dreamin' (World Pacific 1845)
- 1966 Girl in Love (World Pacific 1853)
- 1967 Brazil! Brazil! Brazil! (World Pacific 1855)
- 1967 Bud Shank Plays Music from Today's Movies (World Pacific 1864)
- 1967 A Spoonful of Jazz (World Pacific 1868)
- 1968 Magical Mystery (World Pacific 1873)
- 1969 Windmills of Your Mind (Pacific Jazz 20157)
- 1970 Let It Be (Pacific Jazz 20170)
- 1976 Sunshine Express (Concord Jazz 20)
- 1978 Heritage (Concord Jazz 58)
- 1979 Crystal Comments (Concord Jazz 126)
- 1980 Explorations (Concord Jazz 2002)
- 1983 Yesterday, Today and Forever (Concord Jazz 223) – with Shorty Rogers
- 1984 Back Again (Choice/Bainbridge 6829) – with Shorty Rogers
- 1984 This Bud's for You... (Muse 5309)
- 1985 California Concert (Contemporary 14012) – with Shorty Rogers
- 1986 That Old Feeling (Contemporary 14019)
- 1986 Bud Shank Quartet at Jazz Alley (Contemporary 14027)
- 1986 Serious Swingers (Contemporary 14031) – with Bill Perkins
- 1987 Quiet Fire (Contemporary 14064) – with Frank Morgan [released 1991]
- 1989 Tomorrow's Rainbow (Contemporary 14048)
- 1989 Tales of the Pilot: Bud Shank Plays the Music of David Peck (Capri 74025)
- 1990 Drifting Timelessly (Capri 75001)
- 1990 Lost in the Stars: Bud Shank and Lou Levy Play the Sinatra Songbook (Fresh Sound 183)
- 1991 America the Beautiful (Candid 79510) – with Shorty Rogers and the Lighthouse All Stars
- 1991 The Doctor Is In (Candid 79520)
- 1992 Eight Brothers (Candid 79521) – with Shorty Rogers and the Lighthouse All Stars
- 1992 I Told You So! (Recorded Live at Birdland, New York City) (Candid 79533)
- 1992 The Awakening (New Edition/Records Vertriebsges.mb 87065)
- 1993 New Gold! (Candid 79707) [released 1995]
- 1995 Lost Cathedral (ITM 970087)
- 1996 Plays the Music of Bill Evans (Fresh Sound 5012)
- 1996 Bud Shank Sextet Plays Harold Arlen (Jimco 9502)
- 1997 By Request: Bud Shank Meets the Rhythm Section (Milestone 9273)
- 1997 Jazz in Hollywood (Nocturne/Original Jazz Classics 1890) reissue of Nocturne 2; split/shared CD with Lou Levy Trio
- 1998 A Flower Is a Lovesome Thing (Koch Jazz 36912) – with Bob Cooper
- 1999 After You, Jeru: Bud Shank Celebrates the Music of Gerry Mulligan (Fresh Sound 5026)
- 2000 Silver Storm (Raw 201) – with Bill Perkins and Conte Candoli
- 2002 On the Trail (Raw 202)
- 2005 Bouncing With Bud & Phil – Live at Yoshi's (Capri 74071) – with Phil Woods
- 2006 Taking the Long Way Home (Jazzed Media 1015)
- 2007 Beyond the Red Door (Jazzed Media 1027) – with Bill Mays
- 2008 Against the Tide (Portrait of a Jazz Legend) (Jazzed Media 9003) documentary DVD with audio CD
- 2009 Fascinating Rhythms (Recorded Live at the Jazz Bakery, Culver City, California) (Jazzed Media 1045)
- 2009 In Good Company (Capri 74106) – with Jake Fryer [released 2011]

=== As sideman ===
With Laurindo Almeida

- Laurindo Almeida Quartet Featuring Bud Shank (Pacific Jazz, 1955) – re-released in 1961 as Brazilliance on World Pacific
- Holiday in Brasil with Bud Shank as labeled leader, arrangements by Laurindo Almeida (World Pacific, 1959) – re-released in 1962 as Brazilliance, Vol. 2, and in Europe as Jazz Goes Brazil on Fontana
- Latin Contrasts with Bud Shank as labeled leader, arrangements by Laurindo Almeida (World Pacific, 1959) – re-released in 1963 as Brazilliance, Vol. 3

With Chet Baker

- Witch Doctor (Recorded Live at the Lighthouse, Hermosa Beach, California) (Contemporary, 1953 [rel. 1985])
- The Trumpet Artistry of Chet Baker (Pacific Jazz, 1954)
- Chet Baker & Strings (Columbia, 1954)
- Chet Baker Sings and Plays (Pacific Jazz, 1955)
- Chet Baker Big Band (Pacific Jazz, 1956)
- Theme Music from "The James Dean Story" (World Pacific, 1957)

With Gene Clark

- Roadmaster (A&M/Ariola, 1972)
- Firebyrd (Takoma, 1984)

With Buddy Collette

- Buddy Collette's Swinging Shepherds (EmArcy, 1958)
- At the Cinema! (Mercury, 1959)

With Maynard Ferguson

- Maynard Ferguson's Hollywood Party (EmArcy, 1954)
- Dimensions (EmArcy, 1955)
- Around the Horn with Maynard Ferguson (EmArcy, 1956)

With Jimmy Giuffre

- Jimmy Giuffre (Capitol, 1955)
- The Jimmy Giuffre Clarinet (Atlantic, 1956)
- Herb Ellis Meets Jimmy Giuffre (Verve, 1959) – with Herb Ellis

With Stan Kenton

- Innovations in Modern Music (Capitol, 1950)
- Stan Kenton Presents (Capitol, 1950)
- Popular Favorites by Stan Kenton (Capitol, 1953)
- This Modern World (Capitol, 1953)
- The Kenton Era (Capitol, 1955) – rec. 1940–1954
- Lush Interlude (Capitol, 1958)
- Stan Kenton Conducts the Los Angeles Neophonic Orchestra (Capitol, 1965)
- Hair (Capitol, 1969)

With The L.A. 4

- The L.A. Four Scores! (Concord Jazz, 1975)
- The L.A. 4 (Concord Jazz, 1976)
- Pavane Pour Une Infante Défunte (East Wind, 1977)
- Going Home (East Wind, 1977)
- Watch What Happens (Concord Jazz, 1978)
- Just Friends (Concord Jazz, 1978)
- Live At Montreux (Concord Jazz, 1979)
- Zaca (Concord Jazz, 1980)
- Montage (Concord Jazz, 1981)
- Executive Suite (Concord Jazz, 1983)

With Howard Rumsey's Lighthouse All Stars

- Volume 3 (Contemporary, 1953)
- Volume 4 – Oboe/Flute (Contemporary, 1954)
- Volume 5 – In The Solo Spotlight (Contemporary, 1954)
- Volume 6 (Contemporary, 1955)
- Lighthouse At Laguna (Contemporary, 1955)

With Shelly Manne

- The West Coast Sound (Contemporary, 1955)
- Manne–That's Gershwin! (Capitol, 1965)
- Daktari (Atlantic, 1967)

With Gerry Mulligan

- I Want to Live (United Artists, 1958)
- Gene Norman Presents the Original Gerry Mulligan Tentet and Quartet (GNP Crescendo, 1997) – rec. 1953

With Shorty Rogers

- Cool and Crazy (RCA Victor, 1953)
- Shorty Rogers Courts the Count (RCA Victor, 1954)
- Collaboration (RCA Victor, 1954) – with André Previn
- Martians Come Back! (Atlantic, 1955 [rel. 1956])
- Way Up There (Atlantic, 1955 [rel. 1957])
- Afro-Cuban Influence (RCA Victor, 1958)
- Chances Are It Swings (RCA Victor, 1958)
- The Wizard of Oz and Other Harold Arlen Songs (RCA Victor, 1959)
- Shorty Rogers Meets Tarzan (MGM, 1960)
- The Swingin' Nutcracker (RCA Victor, 1960)
- An Invisible Orchard (RCA Victor, 1961 [rel. 1997])
- The Fourth Dimension in Sound (Warner Bros., 1961)
- Bossa Nova (Reprise, 1962)
- Jazz Waltz (Reprise, 1962)

With Pete Rugolo

- Introducing Pete Rugolo (Columbia, 1954)
- Adventures in Rhythm (Columbia, 1954)
- Rugolomania (Columbia, 1955)
- Out on a Limb (EmArcy, 1956)
- New Sounds by Pete Rugolo (Harmony, 1957) – rec. 1954–1955
- An Adventure in Sound: Reeds in Hi-Fi (Mercury, 1958) – rec. 1956
- Rugolo Plays Kenton (EmArcy, 1958)
- The Music from Richard Diamond (EmArcy, 1959)
- Behind Brigitte Bardot (Warner Bros., 1960)
- The Original Music of Thriller (Time, 1961)
- 10 Saxophones and 2 Basses (Mercury, 1961)

With Lalo Schifrin

- Music from Mission: Impossible (Dot, 1967)
- There's a Whole Lalo Schifrin Goin' On (Dot, 1968)
- More Mission: Impossible (Paramount, 1968)
- Mannix (Paramount, 1968)
- Bullitt (Warner Bros., 1968)
- Che! (Tetragrammaton, 1969)
- Kelly's Heroes (MGM, 1970)

With Gerald Wilson

- Moment of Truth (Pacific Jazz, 1962)
- Portraits (Pacific Jazz, 1964)
- On Stage (Pacific Jazz, 1965)

With others

- Elmer Bernstein, The Man with the Golden Arm (Decca, 1956)
- Buddy Bregman, Swinging Kicks (Verve, 1957)
- Charlie Byrd Trio, Brazilville (Concord Jazz, 1981)
- Nat King Cole, L-O-V-E (Capitol, 1965)
- Miles Davis, At Last! (Recorded Live at the Lighthouse, Hermosa Beach, California) (Contemporary, 1953 [rel. 1985])
- Ron Elliott, The Candlestickmaker (Warner Bros., 1970)
- Clare Fischer, Extension (Pacific Jazz, 1963)
- Herbie Harper, Herbie Harper Featuring Bud Shank and Bob Gordon (Liberty, 1956)
- Johnny Holiday, Johnny Holiday Sings (Pacifica, 1954)
- Richard "Groove" Holmes, Six Million Dollar Man, (Flying Dutchman, 1975)
- Barney Kessel, Easy Like (Contemporary, 1953)
- Julie London, All Through the Night: Julie London Sings the Choicest of Cole Porter (Liberty, 1965)
- The Mamas & the Papas, "California Dreamin'" (Dunhill, 1965)
- Sérgio Mendes, Brasil '65 (Capitol, 1965)
- Hugo Montenegro, Colours of Love (RCA Victor, 1970)
- Oliver Nelson, Skull Session (Flying Dutchman, 1975)
- Harry Nilsson, Duit on Mon Dei (RCA Victor, 1975)
- Jack Nitzsche, Heart Beat: Soundtrack (Capitol, 1980)
- Anita O'Day, Cool Heat (Verve, 1959)
- Patti Page, In the Land of Hi-Fi (EmArcy, 1956)
- Boz Scaggs, Silk Degrees (Columbia, 1976)
- Ravi Shankar, Improvisations (World Pacific, 1962)
- Gábor Szabó and Bob Thiele, Light My Fire (Impulse!, 1967)
- Kitty White, A Moment of Love (Pacifica, 1956)
