= Claude Williamson =

American jazz pianist (1926–2016)

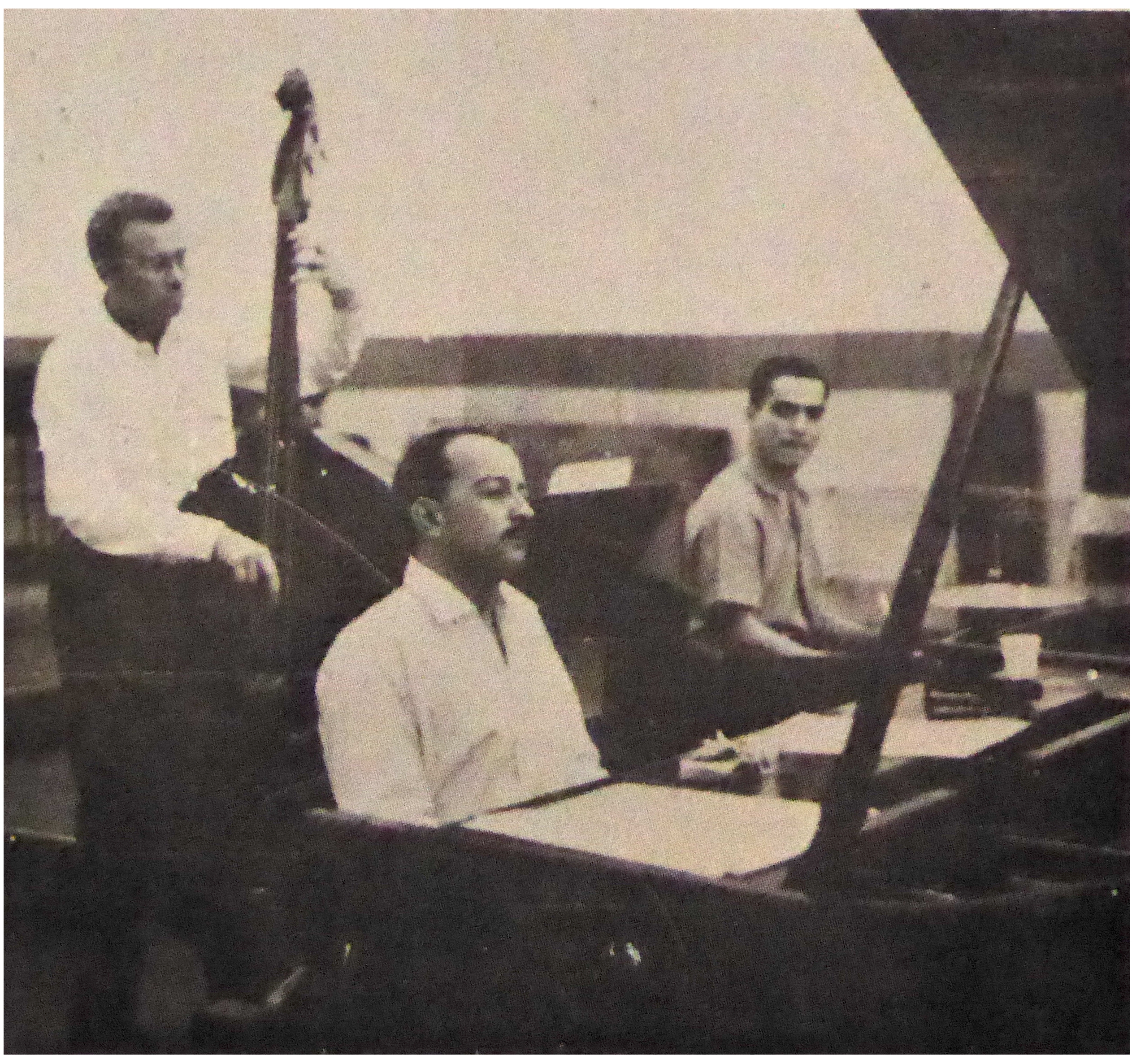
Piano: Claude Williamson Bass: Don Prell Drums: Chuck Flores

Claude Berkeley Williamson (November 18, 1926 – July 16, 2016) was an American jazz pianist.

Williamson was born in Brattleboro, Vermont, United States. He studied at the New England Conservatory of Music before moving to jazz, influenced mainly by Teddy Wilson, then by Al Haig and Bud Powell. In 1947, he moved to California, working first with Teddy Edwards, then with Red Norvo in San Francisco, with Charlie Barnet in 1949, and with June Christy for two years. Later he worked with Max Roach, Art Pepper and others. Williamson was a longtime member of the Lighthouse All-Stars (substituting for pianist Russ Freeman), performing with Bud Shank, Stan Levey, Bob Cooper, Conte Candoli and Howard Rumsey. In 1956, he became the piano player in the Bud Shank quartet. In 1968, he started working as a pianist for NBC, first on The Andy Williams Show, then for Sonny and Cher. In 1978, Williamson went back to the jazz world and released many albums, mainly for Japanese labels, often accompanied by Sam Jones and Roy Haynes. In 1995 he made a trio recording for Fresh Sound Records at the Jazz Bakery in Los Angeles.

His younger brother was trumpeter Stu Williamson (1933–1991).

He died on July 16, 2016, at the age of 89.

== Discography ==
- 195t Kenton Jazz Presents: Claude Williamson Trio - Key West
- 1956 'Round Midnight (Bethlehem)
- 1956 Claude Williamson (Bethlehem) (re-released under title Have Piano Can't Travel by Starday-King Records)
- 1956 Trio/Round Midnight (Bethlehem Jap) (two Lp's reissued in this CD in 2005)
- 1958 Claude Williamson Mulls the Mulligan Scene With His Twin Jazz Pianos And Trio (Criterion)
- 1958 In Italy (Broadway International)
- 1961 The Fabulous Claude Williamson Trio (Contract Recs)
- 1962 Theatre Party Attended By The C W Quartet (Contract Recs)
- 1977 Stella by Starlight (Interplay Jap)
- 1977 Holography (Interplay)
- 1978 Blues in Front (Storyville)
- 1979 La Fiesta
- 1978 New Departure (Interplay)
- 1981 Tribute to Bud (Eastworld)
- 1983 Claude Reigns (Interplay)
- 1987 Live! "The Sermon" (Fresh Sound)
- 1988 Standards (Interplay)
- 1990 Memories of West Coast (Interplay)
- 1990 Standards, Vol. 2 (Interplay)
- 1991 As Time Goes By (Interplay)
- 1992 South of the Border, West of the Sun (Venus)
- 1994 El Noche De Espana (Interplay)
- 1994 Live In Tokyo (Interplay)
- 1995 Autumn In New York (Interplay)
- 1995 Hallucinations (VSOP)
- 1995 Live at the Jazz Bakery (Fresh Sound)
- 2001 Collaboration 93 (Interplay)
- 2002 Song for My Father (Venus)
- 2006 Blue Minor (Pony Canyon)
- 2006 Claude Williamson Trio (EMI)
- 2008 Cleopatra's Dream (M&I)

With Chet Baker

- Witch Doctor (Contemporary, 1953 [1985])
- Theme Music from "The James Dean Story" (World Pacific, 1956)

With Maynard Ferguson

- Jam Session featuring Maynard Ferguson (EmArcy, 1954)

With Conte Candoli

- Sincerely Conti

(Bethlehem Records, 1956)

With Stan Kenton

- Stan Kenton Conducts the Los Angeles Neophonic Orchestra (Capitol, 1965)

With Barney Kessel

- Kessel Plays Standards (Contemporary, 1954)
- Music to Listen to Barney Kessel By (Contemporary, 1956)

With Spokes Mashiyane

- Kwela Claude (Trutone Records/Quality, 1958)

With Gerry Mulligan and Johnny Hodges

- Gerry Mulligan Meets Johnny Hodges (Verve, 1959)

With Art Pepper

- Surf Ride (Savoy, 1952–1954 [1956])

With Dizzy Reece and Ted Curson

- Blowin' Away (Interplay, 1978)

With Pete Rugolo

- Introducing Pete Rugolo (Columbia, 1954)
- Adventures in Rhythm (Columbia, 1954)
- Rugolomania (Columbia, 1955)
- New Sounds by Pete Rugolo (Harmony, 1954–55, [1957])
- An Adventure in Sound: Brass in Hi-Fi (Mercury, 1956 [1958])
- Rugolo Plays Kenton (EmArcy, 1958)
- 10 Trombones Like 2 Pianos (Mercury, 1960)

With Bud Shank

- Strings & Trombones (Pacific Jazz, 1954–55)
- Jazz at Cal-Tech (Pacific Jazz, 1956) with Bob Cooper
- The Bud Shank Quartet (Pacific Jazz, 1956)
- Bud Shank Quartet Featuring Claude Williamson (Pacific Jazz, 1956)
- Bud Shank Plays Tenor (Pacific Jazz, 1957 [1960])
- Blowin' Country (World Pacific, 1958)
- I'll Take Romance (World Pacific, 1958)
