= Irv Kluger =

American jazz musician

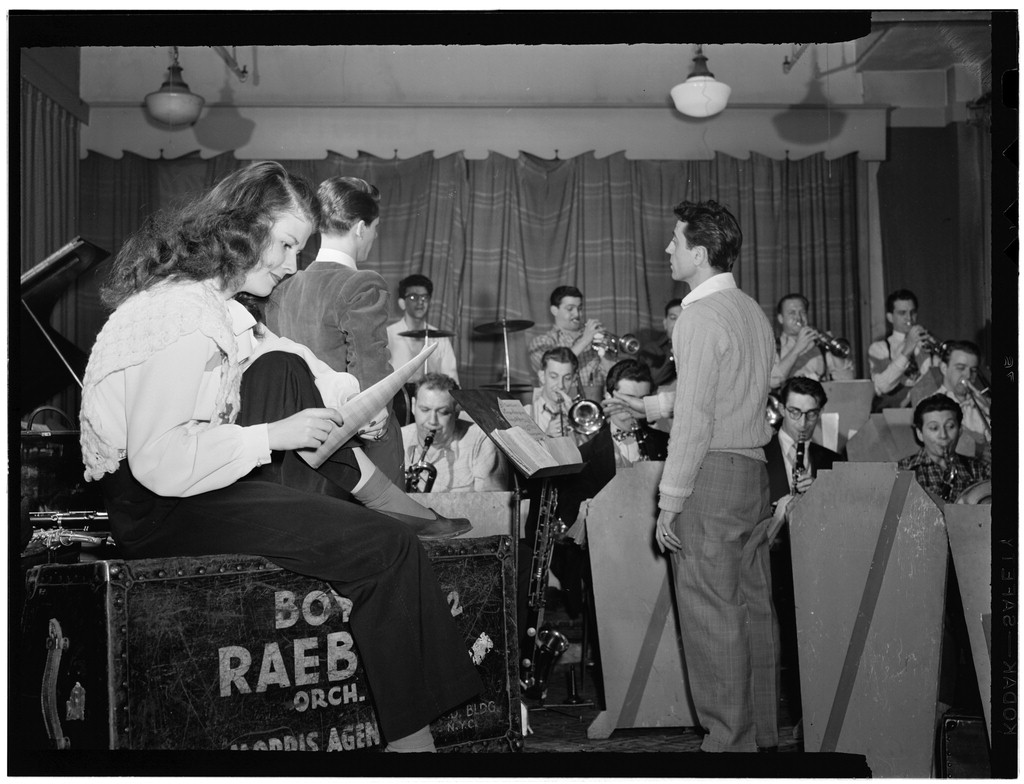
Portrait of Boyd Raeburn, Ginnie Powell, vocalist Johnson, Irv Kluger, Pete Candoli, Wes Hensel, Gordon Boswell, Hy Mandell, Randy Bellerjeau, Abe Markowitz, and Buddy De Franco, Nola's, New York

Irv Kluger (July 9, 1921 – February 28, 2006) was an American jazz drummer.

== Career ==
He was born in New York, United States. Kluger played violin early in life before settling on drums; his first professional gigs came at age 15. He played with Georgie Auld in 1942-43, then with Bob Chester, Freddie Slack, Dizzy Gillespie (1945), Boyd Raeburn (1945–47), Bobby Byrne and Herbie Fields (1947). Following this he played with Stan Kenton (1947–48), Artie Shaw (1949–50), then for a short time in 1950 with Tex Beneke.

He played less jazz after 1950, working in the pit orchestras of Broadway shows such as Guys and Dolls (1950–53). He returned to play with Artie Shaw again in 1953–54 as a member of the Gramercy Five. In the middle of the 1950s he moved to California and played at the Moulin Rouge in Hollywood as the house drummer. He played with Dave Pell in 1956, and with Benny Goodman and Woody Herman later in life, doing much freelance work through the 1960s and 1970s. As a studio musician he played with Johnny Cash. Kluger never led his own recording session.

== Discography ==
=== As sideman ===
- Georgie Auld, Handicap (Musicraft, 1990)
- Milt Bernhart, Modern Brass (RCA Victor, 1955)
- Stan Kenton, The Kenton Era (Capitol, 1955)
- Dave Pell, Love Story (Atlantic, 1956)
- Dave Pell, Campus Hop Jazz Goes Dancing (RCA Victor, 1958)
- Boyd Raeburn, On the Air Vol. 2 (Hep, 1974)
- Boyd Raeburn, Boyd Meets Stravinski (Savoy, 1955)
- Artie Shaw, 1949 Previously Unreleased (MusicMasters, 1990)
- Pete Rugolo, The Music from Richard Diamond (EmArcy, 1959)
- Lennie Tristano & Buddy DeFranco, Crosscurrents (Capitol, 1972)
