= Shorty Rogers Courts the Count =

Studio album by Shorty Rogers
- Released: 1954
- Recorded: February 2 & 9 and March 3, 1954; Los Angeles, CA
- Genre: Jazz
- Length: 39:25
- Label: RCA Victor; LJM 1004

Shorty Rogers chronology
Cool and Crazy (1953)	Shorty Rogers Courts the Count (1954)	Bud Shank – Shorty Rogers – Bill Perkins (1955)

Shorty Rogers Courts the Count is an album by American jazz trumpeter, composer and arranger Shorty Rogers, released on the RCA Victor label in 1954.

== Reception ==
Professional ratings
Review scores
Source	Rating
Allmusic	4/5 stars
The Penguin Guide to Jazz Recordings	4/4 stars

Allmusic noted "Having found his own voice through stints with Woody Herman and Stan Kenton, Rogers gets a chance to show his appreciation for one of his early influences, with charts that both reflect the supple bounce of Basie and the complexly cool sound the trumpeter had been forging since the late '40s".

== Track listing ==
All compositions by Shorty Rogers except where noted.

1. "Jump for Me" (Count Basie) - 4:00
2. "Topsy" (Edgar Battle, Eddie Durham) - 3:21
3. "It's Sand, Man" (Ed Lewis) - 3:00
4. "Basie Eyes" (Shorty Rogers) - 3:27
5. "Doggin' Around" (Battle, Herschel Evans) - 2:36
6. "Down for Double" (Freddie Green) - 2:57
7. "Over and Out" - 3:15
8. "H & J" (Harry Edison, Jo Jones) -3:02
9. "Taps Miller" (Basie) - 3:23
10. "Tickletoe" (Lester Young) - 2:40
11. "Swingin' the Blues" (Basie, Durham) - 4:29
12. "Walk, Don't Run" - 3:15
- Recorded in Los Angeles, CA on February 2, 1954 (tracks 2–5), February 9, 1954 (tracks 1, 6, 7 & 11) and March 3, 1954 (tracks 8–10 & 12)

== Personnel ==
- Shorty Rogers - trumpet, arranger
- Pete Candoli (tracks 1 & 6–12), Harry Edison, Maynard Ferguson, Conrad Gozzo, Clyde Reasinger (tracks 2–5), - trumpet
- Milt Bernhart, Harry Betts - trombone
- Bob Enevoldsen - valve trombone
- John Graas - French horn
- Paul Sarmento - tuba
- Jimmy Giuffre - clarinet, tenor saxophone
- Herb Geller, Bud Shank - alto saxophone
- Bob Cooper (tracks 2–5 & 8–12), Bill Holman (tracks 1, 6, 7 & 11), Zoot Sims (tracks 2–5, 8–10 & 12) - tenor saxophone
- Bob Gordon (tracks 1, 6, 7 & 11) - baritone saxophone
- Marty Paich - piano
- Curtis Counce - bass
- Shelly Manne - drums
