= Collaboration (Shorty Rogers and André Previn album) =

Studio album by Shorty Rogers and André Previn
- Released: 1955
- Recorded: March 30, June 14 and September 14, 1954
- Studio: RCA Victor Studios, Hollywood, CA
- Genre: Jazz
- Length: 34:54
- Label: RCA Victor

Shorty Rogers chronology
Bud Shank – Shorty Rogers – Bill Perkins (1955)	Collaboration (1955)	The Swinging Mr. Rogers (1955)

André Previn chronology
André Previn Plays Gershwin (1953)	Collaboration (1955)	Double Play! (1957)

Collaboration is an album by jazz trumpeter Shorty Rogers and pianist André Previn, released by RCA Victor in 1955.

== Reception ==
Professional ratings
Review scores
Source	Rating
AllMusic	3/5 stars
The Penguin Guide to Jazz Recordings	3/4 stars

Billboard in 1955 praised the sidemen and added: "The boys turn out some mighty listenable jazz and both Rogers and Previn wear their arranging laurels proudly." AllMusic reviewer Scott Yanow observed: "Shorty Rogers and Andre Previn split the arranging chores in a somewhat competitive fashion. Rogers arranges a standard and then that is followed by a Previn original based on the same chord structure. This procedure is followed until the halfway point of the date when they reverse roles. ...the result is a dead heat with some fine swinging solos".

== Track listing ==
All compositions by André Previn, except where indicated.

1. "It's De-Lovely" (Cole Porter) - 2:28
2. "Porterhouse" - 2:47
3. "Heat Wave" (Irving Berlin) - 2:38
4. "40 Degrees Below" - 2:42
5. "You Stepped Out of a Dream" (Nacio Herb Brown, Gus Kahn) - 2:27
6. "Claudia" - 3:25*
7. "You Do Something to Me" (Porter) - 3:07
8. "Call for Cole" (Shorty Rogers) - 2:18
9. "Everything I've Got (Belongs to You)" (Richard Rodgers, Lorenz Hart) - 3:37
10. "Some Antics" (Shorty Rogers) - 3:23
11. "It Only Happens When I Dance with You" (Berlin) - 3:02
12. "General Cluster" (Shorty Rogers) - 3:00
- Recorded at RCA Studios in Hollywood, CA on March 30, 1954 (tracks 3, 5, 9 & 11), June 14, 1954 (tracks 4, 6, 10 & 12) and September 14, 1954 (tracks 1, 2, 7 & 8)
- Written upon the birth of Previn's first child, daughter Claudia Previn, and dedicated "to Claudia"

== Personnel ==
- Shorty Rogers - trumpet, arranger
- André Previn - piano, arranger
- Milt Bernhart - trombone
- Bud Shank - alto saxophone, flute
- Bob Cooper - tenor saxophone
- Jimmy Giuffre - baritone saxophone
- Al Hendrickson (tracks 3–6 & 9–12), Jack Marshall (tracks 1, 2, 7 & 8) - guitar
- Curtis Counce (tracks 4, 6, 10 & 12), Joe Mondragon (tracks 1–3, 5, 7–9 & 11) - bass
- Shelly Manne - drums
