= 10 Trombones Like 2 Pianos =

Studio album by Pete Rugolo and Orchestra
- Released: 1960
- Recorded: May 10 & 12, 1960; United Recording Studios, Hollywood, CA
- Genre: Jazz
- Label: Mercury; PPS 2001/PPS 6001
- Producer: David Carroll

Pete Rugolo chronology
Behind Brigitte Bardot (1959)	10 Trombones Like 2 Pianos (1960)	The Original Music of Thriller (1961)

10 Trombones Like 2 Pianos is an album by composer, arranger and conductor Pete Rugolo featuring performances recorded in 1960 and first released on the Mercury label as part of its audiophile Perfect Presence Sound Series.

== Reception ==
Professional ratings
Review scores
Source	Rating
AllMusic	4/5 stars

The AllMusic review by arwulf arwulf noted:

Ten Trombones Like Two Pianos consists of 12 grooved up slip-horn routines delivered by eight tenor and two bass trombones with stylish rhythm accompaniment. ... delightfully suave, sophisticated and relaxing. ... will appeal directly to those who crave late-'50s mainstream jazz, Hollywood production and crisp, cool lounge music.

— arwulf, arwulf. Ten Trombones Like Two Pianos – Review at AllMusic. Retrieved October 6, 2016.

== Track listing ==
1. "Marie" (Irving Berlin) - 2:10
2. "Moonglow/'Theme from Picnic" (Will Hudson, Irving Mills, Eddie DeLange/George Duning, Steve Allen) - 2:38
3. "Let There Be Love" (Lionel Rand, Ian Grant) - 1:40
4. "Like Love" (André Previn, Dory Langdon) - 2:32
5. "Willow Weep for Me" (Ann Ronnell) - 3:14
6. "Intermission Riff" (Ray Wetzel) - 4:02
7. "Love Is Just Around the Corner" (Lewis E. Gensler, Leo Robin) - 3:12
8. "Angel Eyes" (Matt Dennis, Earl Brent) - 3:44
9. "Love Is Here to Stay" (George Gershwin, Ira Gershwin) - 3:12
10. "It's a Most Unusual Day" (Jimmy McHugh, Harold Adamson) - 2:08
11. "Basin Street East" (McHugh, Rugolo) - 2:10
12. "Ten Trombones Like" (Rugolo) - 3:17
- Recorded at United Recording Studios, Hollywood, CA on May 10, 1960 (tracks 2, 4, 6-8 & 11) and May 12, 1960 (tracks 1, 3, 5, 9, 10 & 12).

== Personnel ==
- Pete Rugolo - arranger, conductor
- Milt Bernhart, Harry Betts, Bob Fitzpatrick, Vern Friley, Herbie Harper (tracks 2, 4, 6-8 & 11), Francis “Joe” Howard (tracks 2, 4, 6-8 & 11), Dick Nash (tracks 1, 3, 5, 9, 10 & 12), Dick Noel (tracks 1, 3, 5, 9, 10 & 12), Bob Pring, Frank Rosolino - trombone
- Russell Brown, George Roberts (tracks 1, 3, 5, 9, 10 & 12), Ken Shroyer (tracks 2, 4, 6-8 & 11) - bass trombone
- Russ Freeman, John Williams (tracks 2, 4, 6-8 & 11), Claude Williamson (tracks 1, 3, 5, 9, 10 & 12) - piano
- Red Mitchell - bass
- Shelly Manne - drums
