= Witch Doctor (album) =

Live album by Chet Baker and the Lighthouse All Stars
- Released: 1985
- Recorded: September 13, 1953
- Venue: The Lighthouse, Hermosa Beach, California
- Genre: Jazz
- Length: 40:57
- Label: Contemporary; C 7649
- Producer: Lester Koenig

Chet Baker chronology
The Trumpet Artistry of Chet Baker (1953-54)	Witch Doctor (1985)	Chet Baker Sings (1954)

Witch Doctor is a live album by American jazz trumpeter Chet Baker which was recorded at The Lighthouse in Hermosa Beach in 1953 and released on the Contemporary label in 1985.

== Reception ==
Professional ratings
Review scores
Source	Rating
Allmusic	2.5/5 stars
The Penguin Guide to Jazz Recordings	3/4 stars

Rick Anderson of Allmusic states, "this disc finds Baker playing well, if not very consistently, and features a shifting group behind him... There are better introductions to the Lighthouse sound, but this album is sure to please Chet Baker fans".

== Track listing ==
1. "Loaded" (Bernard Miller) - 7:50
2. "I'll Remember April" (Gene de Paul, Patricia Johnston, Don Raye) - 11:51
3. "Winter Wonderland" (Felix Bernard, Richard B. Smith) - 4:20
4. "Pirouette" (Shorty Rogers) - 7:47
5. "Witch Doctor" (Bob Cooper) - 9:09

== Personnel ==
- Chet Baker - trumpet
- Rolf Ericson - trumpet (tracks 1, 2, 4 & 5)
- Bud Shank - alto saxophone, baritone saxophone (tracks 1, 2, 4 & 5)
- Jimmy Giuffre (tracks 1 & 2), Bob Cooper (tracks 4 & 5) - tenor saxophone
- Russ Freeman (tracks 1–3), Claude Williamson (tracks 4 & 5) - piano
- Howard Rumsey - bass
- Shelly Manne (tracks 4 & 5), Max Roach (tracks 1–3) - drums
