= Thriller (American TV series) =

American anthology television series (1960–1962)

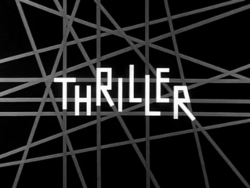
- Title card
- Genre: Anthology; Horror; Thriller
- Created by: Hubbell Robinson
- Directed by: John Brahm; Jules Bricken; Herschel Daugherty; Paul Henreid; Douglas Heyes; Arthur Hiller; Mitchell Leisen; Ida Lupino; Gerald Mayer; John Newland; Ted Post
- Presented by: Boris Karloff
- Starring: Various
- Theme music composer: Pete Rugolo
- Composers: Jerry Goldsmith; Stanley Wilson; Pete Rugolo; Morton Stevens
- Country of origin: United States
- Original language: English
- No. of seasons: 2
- No. of episodes: 67

Production
- Executive producer: Hubbell Robinson
- Producers: William Frye; Fletcher Markle; Maxwell Shane
- Running time: 49 min. (Season 1); 50 min. (Season 2)
- Production companies: Hubbell Robinson Productions; Revue Studios

Original release
- Network: NBC
- Release: September 13, 1960 – April 30, 1962

Thriller (also known as Boris Karloff's Thriller and Boris Karloff Presents) is an American anthology television series that aired during the 1960–61 and 1961–62 seasons on NBC. The show featured host Boris Karloff introducing a mix of macabre horror tales and suspense thrillers.

== Overview ==
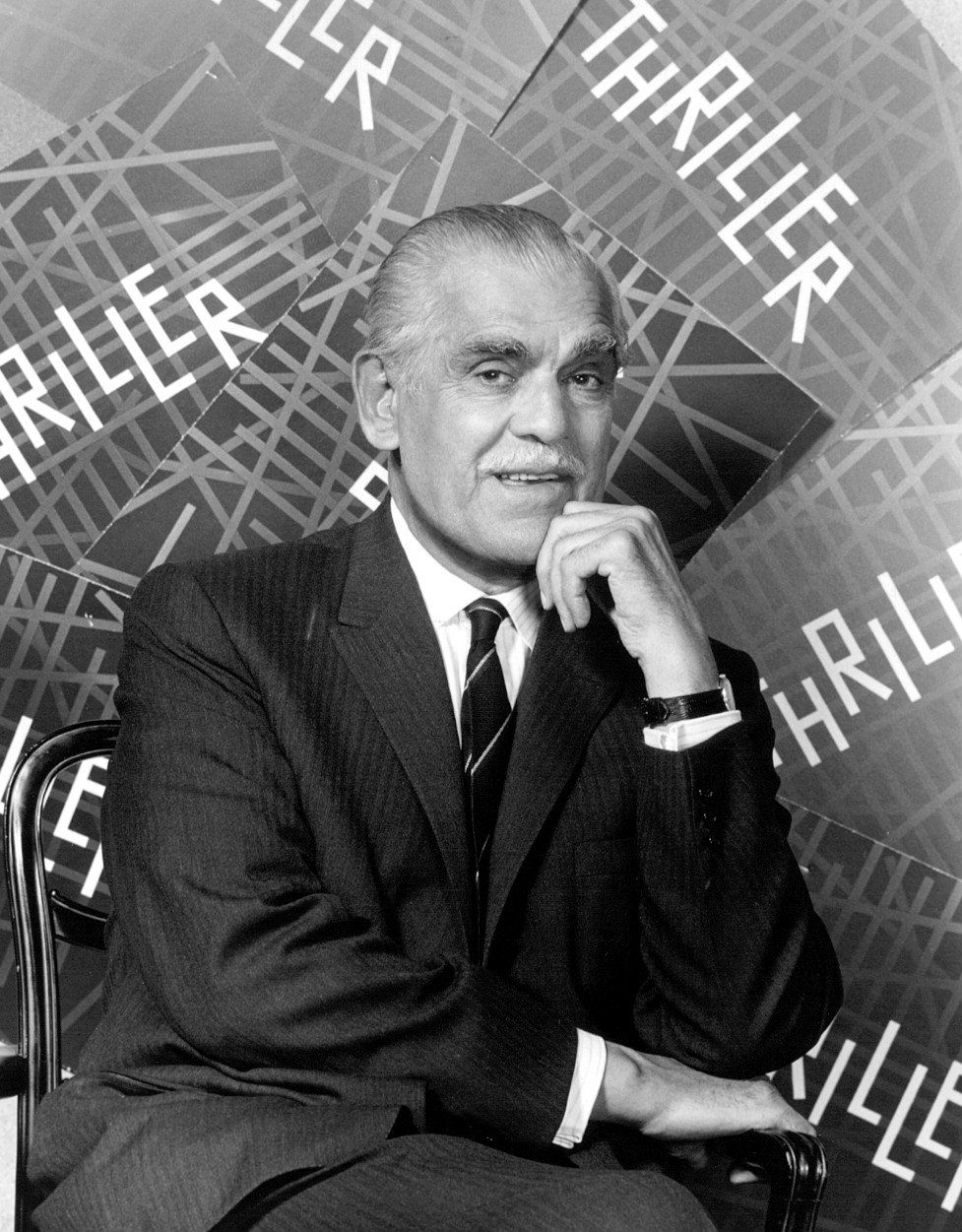
Boris Karloff in Thriller (1960)

Thriller was created by Hubbell Robinson for MCA's Revue Studios. Though remembered primarily as a series that emphasized gothic horror, under producer Fletcher Markle Thriller was initially a series oriented towards suspense and crime drama, in the manner of Alfred Hitchcock Presents. Markle was let go after having completed eight episodes, and replaced by Maxwell Shane. Shane continued in the crime drama mold, though he began to add trappings of gothic horror to a few stories, but he too was replaced after having completed a further nine episodes. The rest of the first season and all of the second was produced by William Frye, who firmly moved Thriller into the format for which it would be most well-remembered, although non-horror crime and mystery stories would still be featured from time to time throughout the show's run.

Among the many writers for the series were Donald S. Sanford, Robert Hardy Andrews, and Robert Bloch, who adapted a number of his own stories, notably "The Weird Tailor". Authors whose works were frequently adapted included August Derleth, Charlotte Armstrong and Cornell Woolrich.

In addition to serving as the host of the series, Karloff also starred in five episodes: "The Prediction", "The Premature Burial", "The Last of the Sommervilles", "Dialogues with Death", and "The Incredible Doctor Markesan".

Other actors included Leslie Nielsen in the show's first episode "The Twisted Image", William Shatner in two episodes, "The Hungry Glass" and "The Grim Reaper", Constance Ford in two episodes, Mary Tyler Moore in two episodes, Henry Daniell in five episodes, and Edward Andrews in three episodes. Child actress Beverly Washburn appeared in "Parasite Mansion"; Joan Tompkins appeared in "The Cheaters" and "Mr. George". Elizabeth Montgomery, Tom Poston, and John Carradine in "Masquerade". Carradine also starred in "The Remarkable Mrs. Hawk", co-starring Bruce Dern and Jo Van Fleet; Ed Nelson starred in four episodes: "The Fatal Impulse", "The Cheaters", "A Good Imagination", and "Dialogues with Death".

Other performers included: Rip Torn, George Grizzard, Natalie Trundy, Bethel Leslie, Patricia Medina, Patricia Barry, Richard Anderson, Richard Chamberlain, Elisha Cook, Conrad Nagel, Larry Pennell, Russell Johnson, Diana Millay, Philip Carey, Kathleen Crowley, Susan Oliver, Rodolfo Hoyos Jr., J. Pat O'Malley, Robert Vaughn, Marlo Thomas, John Ireland, Jeanette Nolan, Virginia Gregg, Hazel Scott, Lloyd Bochner, Scott Marlowe, Judson Pratt, Olive Sturgess, Mary Astor, Marion Ross, Hazel Court, MacDonald Carey, Donna Douglas, Natalie Schafer, Phyllis Thaxter, Estelle Winwood, Antoinette Bower, Jane Greer, Dick York, Jocelyn Brando, Richard Carlson, William Windom, George Kennedy, Cloris Leachman, Nancy Kelly, Patricia Breslin and Edward Binns.

In Danse Macabre, Stephen King's 1981 history and critique of horror fiction, King suggests that Thriller was the best series of its kind up to that point.

Alfred Hitchcock hastened the demise of the series after he came aboard on NBC with his half-hour anthology series, Alfred Hitchcock Presents after moving from CBS in 1960. Hitchcock apparently did not want two similar shows on at the same time.Thriller moved from Tuesdays to Mondays in the second season, which led to its eventual cancellation, but Hitchcock moved his series back to CBS the following season and expanded its format into The Alfred Hitchcock Hour.

In a review of the anthology's 2010 DVD release, The Hollywood Reporter said "Not all the episodes work, and the transfers can be a bit grainy. But when they do—the strong shadows living in the black and white, the awesomely overwrought score by composers Jerry Goldsmith and Morton Stevens (if only they had music like that again), the storytelling not using gore and cheap scares as crutches—the results are genuinely goosebump-inducing."

== Episodes ==
Due to a number of TV stations that pre-empted Thriller in favor of local programs, Thriller only ran for two seasons starting September 1960. A few minutes into each episode, Boris Karloff introduces the title of the episode, the "major players" (actors) in that episode, and states that "as sure as my name is Boris Karloff, this is a thriller!" Karloff also appeared as an actor in five episodes over the duration of the series.

=== Season 1 (1960–61) ===
The show premiered on September 13, 1960, with the episode "The Twisted Image". It had 37 episodes in the first season (in addition to serving as the host of the series, Karloff starred in one episode in the first season: "The Prediction").

No. overall	No. in season	Title	Directed by	Written by	Original release date
1	1	"The Twisted Image"	Arthur Hiller	Teleplay by : James P. Cavanagh; Based on a novel by : William O'Farrell	September 13, 1960
Alan Patterson (Leslie Nielsen) is a businessman who meets a couple of mentally disturbed people, Merle Jenkins (George Grizzard), and Lily Hanson (Natalie Trundy), whose envy of him and his life becomes obsessive. This, along with the next five episodes in broadcast order, was produced by Fletcher Markle. Also starring: Judy Patterson (Dianne Foster), Louise Jenkins (Constance Ford), Marge (Virginia Christine), Mrs. Rudley (Carol Kelly), Bill Purdy (Ray Montgomery), Burt (Mickey Simpson), Sue (Pamela Duncan), and Leticia Patterson (Judy Whitney).
2	2	"Child's Play"	Arthur Hiller	Robert Dozier	September 20, 1960
Hank Hattering (Tom Nolan) is a little boy who lives his life in the fantasy world of his daydreams, fighting a made-up enemy, while his parents, Bart (Frank Overton) and Gale (Bethel Leslie), argue over custody of him as they separate. With Parley Baer as a hunter Hank believes is “Black Bart”.
3	3	"Worse Than Murder"	Mitchell Leisen	Story by : Evelyn Berckman; Teleplay by : Mel Goldberg	September 27, 1960
Connie Walworth (Constance Ford) is a widow who is shocked to learn that her late husband's Uncle Archer did not leave a will, and thus left no inheritance for her. She learns from their family lawyer, Mr. Sinclair (Jay Jostyn) that her mother-in-law, Myra (Harriet MacGibbon) will receive everything by default. Connie blackmails Myra to ensure she gets a cut of the money. Also starring: Dr. Ralph Mitchell (John Baragrey), Anne Walworth (Christine White), Ray (Dan Tobin), Emma Snyder (Jocelyn Brando), Bessie (Erma Robinson), and Sarah Gedney (Mary Young).
4	4	"The Mark of the Hand"	Paul Henreid	Teleplay by : Eric Peters; Based on the novel by : Charlotte Armstrong	October 4, 1960
A little girl, Tessa Kilburn (Terry Burnham), apparently shoots a man, Charles Mowry (Charles Cooper), to death at her family's vacation house. Everyone runs in and tries to figure out why she did it, but she says that her muteness has a purpose. It turns out that her father Douglas (Shepperd Strudwick)'s fiancée, Sylvia Walsh (Mona Freeman), cooked up a scheme with Charles and his brother Paul (Berry Kroeger) to get Douglas' money. Charles threatens to expose them, and Sylvia shoots him, and frames Tessa for the murder. Also starring: Lt. Gordon (Judson Pratt), Betty Follett (Rachel Ames), Mrs. Kilburn (Jessie Royce Landis), and Dr. Emil Berland (Jon Lormer).
5	5	"Rose's Last Summer"	Arthur Hiller	Teleplay by : Marie Baumer; Based on the novel by : Margaret Millar.	October 11, 1960
An actress, Rose French (Mary Astor), gets thrown out of a bar and nearly hit by a car, and is arrested. Frank Clyde (Lin McCarthy) runs a rehabilitation center for alcoholics and helped Rose in the past. Frank and her landlady, Annie Cushman (Loie Bridge), are surprised to learn she is going to La Mesa, California, to take a job as a housekeeper. Shortly after, they learn that Rose was found dead in the garden of a stranger's home, and it turns out that the job was actually a very unusual acting gig. Also starring: Hailey Dolloway (Jack Livesay), Ethel (Dorothy Green), Willet Goodfield (Arbie Albright), Capt. Greer (Robert Osterloh), and Mrs. Horace Goodfield (Mary Astor).
6	6	"The Guilty Men"	Jules Bricken	John Vlahos	October 18, 1960
Three boys who grew up in a bad neighborhood try to become successful adults, but they get mixed up with the Mafia. Lou Adams (Everett Sloane) is a consigliere, Cesar Romano (Frank Silvera) is a crime syndicate boss, Tony Romano (John Marley) is a respected doctor. Also starring: Harry Gans (Jay C. Flippen), Martha Adams (Anne Barton), Anna Romano (Argentina Brunetti), Johhny Longo (Anthony Caruso), and Hymie (Ralph Neff).
7	7	"The Purple Room"	Douglas Heyes	Douglas Heyes	October 25, 1960
Duncan Corey (Rip Torn) is set to inherit his brother's valuable land and the house on the property, with the stipulation that he has to spend the night there and live there for one year. If he fails to follow those rules, the inheritance will go to his cousins, Rachel (Patricia Barry), and Oliver Judson (Richard Anderson). First episode, in broadcast order, produced by William Frye. Also starring: Mr. Ridgewater (Alan Napier), Sheriff Wiley (Ray Teal), and Caroline Van Ransom (Joanna Hayes).
8	8	"The Watcher"	John Brahm	Teleplay by : Donald S. Sanford; Based on the novel by : Dolores Hitchens	November 1, 1960
In a resort town being plagued by a serial murderer, Mr. Freitag (Martin Gabel), a lonely school teacher, sits in a boat, the "Suzie-Tee", and is struggling to drown a woman by pushing her head under water as she tries to fight to save herself. The incident is eventually classified as an accident, but there are skeptics who push to probe deeper. Produced by William Frye. Also starring: Beth Pettit (Olive Sturgess), Larry Carter (Richard Chamberlain), Uncle Florian (Stuart Erwin), Al Matthews (James Westerfield), Mrs. Edith Petit (Irene Harvey) Eunice Appleby (Claire Carleton), Vida Tomlinson (Gloria Clark), Sheriff Phil Archer (Alan Baxter).
9	9	"Girl with a Secret"	Mitchell Leisen	Teleplay by : Charles Beaumont; Based on the novel by : Charlotte Armstrong	November 15, 1960
Alice Page (Myrna Fahey) is a newlywed, going to meet her husband Anthony (Rhodes Reason)'s family for the first time. She learns several unsettling things about her new husband and family. Produced by Fletcher Markle. Geraldine Redfern (Fay Bainter), Uncle Gregory Stafford (Paul Hartman), Aunt Hortense Stafford (Anne Seymour), Beatrice Stafford (Cloris Leachman), Mrs. Peele (Ellen Corby), Ellen (Esther Dale), Herb Innes (James Seay), Bluecher (Rex Holman), and Carolik (Victor Buono).
10	10	"The Prediction"	John Brahm	Donald S. Sanford	November 22, 1960
Clayton Mace (Boris Karloff) is a fake mentalist who puts on shows where he claims to see the future from a disco ball inside of a crystal ball. One night, he predicts that a boxer, Tommy Tims, is going to die in a fight, which turns out to be true. He tried to leave to warn the manager and Tommy about what he saw to warn them, but he is restrained by a couple of men, and Roscoe Burton (Alan Caillou) says he will go warn them on his behalf. Roscoe lied and never went to warn them; instead, he makes a bet on the fight based on his knowing of the death, which causes outrage when everyone thinks Clayton orchestrated it. Produced by William Frye. Also starring: Norrine Burton (Audrey Dalton), Grant Dudely (Alexander Davion), Gus Kostopulos (Abraham Sofaer), Gunner Gogan (Murvyn Vye), Charlie (Richard Peel), Harcourt (Seymour Green) and Helen Tate (Iris Bristow).
11	11	"The Fatal Impulse"	Gerald Mayer	Teleplay by : Philip MacDonald; Based on the short story by : John D. MacDonald	November 29, 1960
Harry Elser (Elisha Cook Jr.) is a mentally disturbed man who plots an assassination of a candidate for Mayor, Walker Wylie (Conrad Nagel). Under the guise of being a maintenance man, Harry gets into Walker's office. Harry was placing a bomb in Walker's desk when he is busted but gets away before he can be stopped. He hides in a closet, and, when the coast is clear, he gets on a crowded elevator and puts the bomb in the purse of a woman, Jane Kimball (Whitney Blake). Harry is then hit by a truck but he tells the police about the bomb before he dies. The police race to get it before it detonates at 11pm. First episode, in broadcast order, produced by Maxwell Shane. Lieutenant Brian Rome (Robert Lansing), Sgt. George Dumont (Steve Brodie), Marjorie Dalquiss (Elaine Edwards), Robert Larrimore (Lance Fuller), Mr. Dalquiss (Harry Bartell), Carolyn (Alice Backes), Mary Snyder (Mary Tyler Moore), Brundage (Ed Nelson), Agnes Kimball (Ernestine Barrier), Martha Bailey (Ella Ethridge), and Sgt. Hannigan (Fred Graham).
12	12	"The Big Blackout"	Maurice Geraghty	Teleplay by : Oscar Millard; Based on the novel by : Don Tracy	December 6, 1960
A group of thugs are looking for Bill Logan, with orders to assassinate him when they find him. In a case of mistaken identity, they target a recovering alcoholic, Burt Lewis (Jack Carson), who fits the description of Bill Logan. As the story unravels, not all is what it seems, and Burt does not know whom to trust. Produced by Maxwell Shane. Also starring: Sheriff Cliff Wrights (Charles McGraw), Midge Lewis (Nan Leslie), Ethel Bankstrom (Jeanne Cooper), Doc Mulloy (George Mitchell), Paul Hawkins (Paul Newlan), Nurse Sue (Jean Engstrom), Deputy Broot (Don Wilbanks), Nick Fisher (Robert Carricart), Charlie Pringle (Chubby Johnson), Louie Ramirez (Raoul De Leon), Eddie (Gil Perkins), George Adams (Sol Gorss).
13	13	"Knock Three-One-Two"	Herman Hoffman	Teleplay by : John Kneubuhl; Based on the novel by : Fredric Brown	December 13, 1960
Ray Kenton (Joe Maross) is deep in gambling debt, and only has 24 hours to pay it off, or he will be killed. Ray's wife, Ruth (Beverly Garland) has a savings account, but refuses to give Ray the money, because she is tired of his gambling. Elsewhere, a serial murderer, dubbed the "Silk Stocking Strangler" (Meade Martin), has just left another victim, and later, Ray gets him to help get the money from Ruth by plotting her murder. Produced by Maxwell Shane. Also starring: George Mikos (Charles Aidman), Benny (Warren Oates), Joe Bedell (David Alpert), Charlie (Norman Leavitt), Lt. Tracy (Will White), and Police Captain (Clancy Cooper).
14	14	"Man in the Middle"	Fletcher Markle	Teleplay by : Howard Rodman; Based on a novel by : Charlotte Armstrong	December 20, 1960
Television writer Sam Lynch (Mort Sahl) overhears two men, Mr. Clark (Werner Klemperer) and 'Baby' Hoffman (Julian Burton), plotting the kidnapping and possibly the murder of a socialite, Kay Salisbury (Sue Randall), for a ransom demand of $100,000 from her father, Charles (Frank Albertson). Sam tries to mind his own business, as if he never heard anything, but it is too late — Mr. Clark already saw him, and he gets dragged into the plot. Final episode, in broadcast order, produced by Fletcher Markle. Also starring: Alan Dulaine (Fred Beir), Martha Salisbury (Grace Albertson), Eddie Cowan (Ashley Cowan) Buddy (Fred Sherman), and Alex (Anthony Jochim).
15	15	"The Cheaters"	John Brahm	Teleplay by : Donald S. Sanford; Based on a story by : Robert Bloch	December 27, 1960
Dirk Van Prinn (Henry Daniell) invents spectacles, emblazoned with the word "Veritas" (Latin for "truth"), and the glasses are meant to show the wearer the truth about themselves and others. Horrified at what he sees, Van Prin hangs himself. Years later, while conducting a salvage mission at Dirk's old house, a man finds the spectacles, and they cause death and destruction in his life. The spectacles continue to pass from person to person, a veritable curse in the eye of the beholder, until an afflicted person destroys them. Produced by William Frye. Also starring: Joe Henshaw (Paul Newlan), Maggie Newlan (Linda Watkins), Charlie (Ed Nelson), Miriam Olcott (Mildred Dunnock), Sebastian Grimm (Harry Townes), Ellen Grimm (Joan Tompkins), Edward Dean (Jack Weston), Olive Dean (Barbara Eiler), Clarence Kramer (Dayton Lummis), Mrs. Ames (Molly Glessing), Burgin (Alan Carney), Judge Pfluger (Grandon Rhodes), and Thorgenson (Ralph Clanton).
16	16	"The Hungry Glass"	Douglas Heyes	Teleplay by : Douglas Heyes; Based on the short story by : Robert Bloch	January 3, 1961
Gil Thrasher (William Shatner), and his wife, Marcia (Joanna Heyes), are escorted to their new home, a mansion in New England, by their realtor, Adam Talmadge (Russell Johnson), and his wife, Liz (Elizabeth Allen). The house was formerly occupied by an old woman, Laura Bellman (Ottola Nesmith), whose husband Jonah built the house for her in the 1860s. When she was young, Laura (Donna Douglas) became obsessed with admiring her reflection in a room in the attic that was full of mirrors, eventually falling through one to her death as an old woman. The Thrashers see Laura and other ghosts in the mirrors now, trying to lure them to similar fates. Produced by William Frye. Also starring: Obed (Clem Bevans), and Mr. Cabot (Pitt Herbert).
17	17	"The Poisoner"	Herschel Daugherty	Robert Hardy Andrews	January 10, 1961
Thomas Edward Griffith (Murray Matheson) lies his way into marrying way out of his league to a wealthy socialite, Frances Abercrombie (Sarah Marshall). Thomas later learns Frances lied too, and she married him for money, as well. To Thomas' dismay, his in-laws move in and he quickly stirs up a remedy to be rid of them all. Produced by William Frye. Also starring: Mrs. Abercrombie (Brenda Forbes), Helen Abercrombie (Jennifer Raine), Proctor (David Frankham), George Griffith (Maurice Dallimore), Charles Larimore (Sam Edwards), Sir John Herbert (Seymour Green), and Lord Danforth (Keith Hitchcock).
18	18	"Man in the Cage"	Gerald Mayer	Story by : John Holbrook Vance; Teleplay by : Maxwell Shane and Stuart Jerome	January 17, 1961
Noel Hudson (Guy Stockwell) becomes entangled in a Tangierian drug smuggling scheme and is forced at gunpoint by some evil men to smuggle heroin. Noel manages to take the heroin and make a break for it, but when he completely goes missing, his elder brother, Darryl (Philip Carey), begins a frantic search for him. Produced by Maxwell Shane. Also starring: Ellen McKinstry (Diana Millay), Slip-Slip (Barry Gordon), Inspector Le Boude (Eduardo Ciannelli), Allah El Kazim (Al Ruscio), Arthur Upshaw (Theodore Marcuse), Jean Duval (Than Wyenn), Duff McKinstry (Jonathan Kidd), Ali Atouf (Naji Gabbay), Mrs. Barrister (Lilyan Chauvin), Burdett (Russ Bender), Phil Barrister (Robert J. Stevenson), T-Bone (Arlette Clark), and Gilali (Pedro Regas).
19	19	"Choose a Victim"	Richard Carlson	George Bellak	January 24, 1961
Edith Landers (Susan Oliver) is a wealthy woman whose life is controlled by her domineering Uncle Phillip (Vaughn Taylor). Edith meets a charming con artist, Ralphie Teal (Larry Blyden). Ralphie falls in love with Edith, but soon finds the tables have turned, as a murder plot unfolds. Produced by Maxwell Shane. Also starring: Detective Hazlett (Guy Mitchell), Fay (Tracey Roberts), Detective Sid Benajain (Henry Corden), Sam (Billy Barty), and Larry Kirt (Henry Hunter).
20	20	"Hay-Fork and Bill-Hook"	Herschel Daugherty	Alan Caillou	February 7, 1961
A detective inspector, Harry Roberts (Kenneth Haigh), for the Scotland Yard is summoned to Dark Falls, Wales to investigate the murder of a man by a hay-fork and a bill-hook. When another murder occurs, superstitious locals shift their focus to Harry's wife, Nesta (Audrey Dalton), believing she is a witch. Produced by William Frye. Also starring: Constable Evans (Alan Napier), Sir Wilfred (Alan Caillou), Mother Evans (Doris Lloyd), Thomas Watson (Lumsden Hare), and Mr. Jonas (Ronald Long).
21	21	"The Merriweather File"	John Brahm	Teleplay by : John Kneubuhl; Based on the novel by : Lionel White	February 14, 1961
An intruder breaks into the home of Ann Merriweather (Bethel Leslie), and fails his attempt to kill her. She goes to her neighbor and attorney, Howard Yates (James Gregory) for help with the invasion, and so he can represent her husband, Charles (Ross Elliott), who is charged with murder when a dead body is found in the trunk of his car. Charles claims to know nothing about it. Produced by Maxwell Shane. Also Starring: Lt. Giddeon (Edward Binns), Virginia Grant (K.T. Stevens), and I.L. Gluckman (Bernard Fein).
22	22	"The Fingers of Fear"	Jules Bricken	Teleplay by : Robert Hardy Andrews; Based on the short story by : Philip MacDonald	February 21, 1961
Lt. Jim Wagner (Nehemiah Persoff) is investigating a series of child murders committed by a killer referred to in the press as the "Mad Dog". The likeness of the killer fits that of a local dishwasher, Ohrback (Robert Middleton), and they eventually find enough evidence and witnesses to arrest him. But the investigation shifts to a new suspect, Mr. Merriman (Thayer Roberts), when Ohrback's blood does not match a sample at the crime scene, and evidence of the broken leg of a rare Italian doll is found. Produced by William Frye. Also starring: Sid (H.M. Wynant), Sgt. Spivak (Kevin Hagen), Mr. Zimmer (Dick Wessel), Dr. Lascoe (Robert J. Stevenson), Officer Pat Dutton (Sam Gilman), Commissioner Putnam (Ted de Corsia), Mr. Carter (Richard Travis), Mary Wagner (Jan Brooks), Mr. Martinez (Rodolfo Hoyos Jr.), Mrs. Carlisle (Angela Greene), Mrs. Salerno (Nina Varela), Doris Carlisle (Morgan Brittany), and Joan Wilson (Terry Burnham).
23	23	"Well of Doom"	John Brahm	Teleplay by : Donald S. Sanford; Based on the short story by : John Clemons	February 28, 1961
Robert Penrose (Ronald Howard) is headed to the English countryside for his bachelor party with his butler, Jeremy Teal (Torin Thatcher). While en route, they are accosted by a fiendish pair, Master Styx (Richard Kiel) and Squire Moloch (Henry Daniell), at gunpoint, and Robert offers to sign over .5 million pounds to them. At an estate in the moors, Robert learns some disturbing information about his father. Produced by William Frye. Also starring: Cyril (Billy Beck), and Miss Price (Molly Glessing).
24	24	"The Ordeal of Dr. Cordell"	Laslo Benedek	Donald S. Sanford	March 7, 1961
Dr. Frank Cordell (Robert Vaughn) is conducting chemical experiments in his laboratory when he stumbles on to a strange gas that turns him into a violent homicidal maniac. The race is on to counteract the effects and keep him from killing again. Produced by Maxwell Shane. Also starring: Dr. Lois Walker (Kathleen Crowley), Dr. Brauner (Robert Ellenstein), Lt. Boutaric (Russ Conway), Susan Baker (Marlo Thomas), and Mrs. Heath (Helen Brown).
25	25	"Trio for Terror"	Ida Lupino	Teleplay by : Barré Lyndon after stories by : Nelson Bond, Wilkie Collins, August Derleth	March 14, 1961
The Extra Passenger: Simon (Richard Lupino) plots the death of his wealthy Uncle Julian (Terence de Marney), who unbeknownst to him is a warlock. A Terribly Strange Bed: Collins (Robin Hughes) wins big at the roulette table in a casino and he is convinced by The Hussar (Reginald Owen) to spend the night there, where he is nearly crushed by the canopy of the bed. The Mask of Medusa: The police are on a manhunt for the "Latent Strangler", Shanner (Michael Pate). He hides out in a wax museum, where he meets the owner, Kriss Milo (John Abbott), who shows him all around his exhibit of killers who turned into wax figures after looking at the Mask of Medusa. Also starring: Major Domo (Peter Brocco), Katie (Iris Bristol), and Ashton (Frances Bethencourt). Produced by William Frye.
26	26	"Papa Benjamin"	Ted Post	Teleplay by : John Kneubuhl; Based on a short story by : Cornell Woolrich	March 21, 1961
Bandleader Eddie Wilson (John Ireland) attempts to revive his career by using voodoo music, but after a boost, things take a turn for the worse. Final episode, in broadcast order, produced by Maxwell Shane. Also starring: Judy Wilson (Jeanne Bal), Jerry Roberts (Robert H. Harris), Tommy Statts (Henry Scott), Insp. Daniels (Peter Forster), and Papa Benjamin (Jester Hairston).
27	27	"Late Date"	Herschel Daugherty	Teleplay by : Donald S. Sanford; Based on a short story by : Cornell Woolrich	April 4, 1961
Larry Weeks (Larry Pennell) arrives home to a surprise visit from his brother, James (Edward Platt). James' cheating wife has been strangled to death. Larry helps James frame her lover, Sid (Steve Mitchell), for the murder. This episode was produced by William Frye, as are all Thriller episodes from this point forward. Also starring: Helen (Jody Fair), Gordon (Chris Seitz), Sgt. Crowell (Stuart Randall), Art Brinkenhoff (Stuffy Singer), and Judy Singer (Judy Crowder).
28	28	"Yours Truly, Jack the Ripper"	Ray Milland	Teleplay by : Barré Lyndon; Based on a short story by : Robert Bloch	April 11, 1961
In modern-day (1960s) New York, a series of murders have occurred that fit the M.O. of Jack the Ripper from 70 years prior. A Scotland Yard psychologist, Sir Guy (John Williams) is an expert on the Ripper, and believes the current murders were done by the original killer who he claims had received immortality through blood sacrifice. Capt. Pete Jago (Edmon Ryan) and police psychologist Dr. John Carmody (Donald Woods) are investigating and are skeptical of Guy's claims. Also starring: Rowena (Ottola Nesmith), Hymie Kralik (Adam Williams), and Arlene (Nancy Valentine).
29	29	"The Devil's Ticket"	Jules Bricken	Teleplay by : Robert Bloch; Based on his short story	April 18, 1961
Hector Vane (MacDonald Carey) is an artist who lives with his wife, Marie (Joan Tetzel) in a dump of an apartment. Low on funds, he goes to a pawnshop owned by a miser, Mr. Spengler (Robert Cornthwaite), but is now run by a mysterious pawnbroker (John Emery), who offers Hector three months of fame and fortune in exchange for his soul. If Hector paints a portrait of a human soul before the 90 days are up, he can reclaim his soul but trouble ensues. Also starring: Nadja (Patricia Medina), and Dr. Frank (Hayden Rorke).
30	30	"Parasite Mansion"	Herschel Daugherty	Teleplay by : Donald S. Sanford; Based on a short story by : Mary Elizabeth Counselman	April 25, 1961
On a stormy night in the South, Marcia Hunter (Pippa Scott) takes a detour when the road is closed, and crashes her car when she has a blowout and passes out. She wakes up in a bed in a mansion, rescued by Victor Harrod (James Griffith) and "Granny" (Jeanette Nolan), and is held captive their strange shut-in family with a disturbing secret. When she tries to leave, she is shot at by a young boy, Rennie (Tom Nolan). Lollie (Beverly Washburn), a young girl in the house, is afflicted with a family curse.
31	31	"A Good Imagination"	John Brahm	Teleplay by : Robert Bloch; Based on his short story	May 2, 1961
Frank Logan (Edward Andrews) is fed up with his wife Louise (Patricia Barry)'s numerous affairs, and plots to kill off all of her lovers one by one. Also starring: George Parker (Ed Nelson), Randy Hagen (William Allyn), Joe Thorp (Ken Lynch), Arnold Chase (Britt Lomond), and Celia Perry (Mary Grace Canfield).
32	32	"Mr. George"	Ida Lupino	Teleplay by : Donald S. Sanford; Based on a short story by : Stephen Grendon	May 9, 1961
A lonely child, Priscilla (Gina Gillespie), misses her guardian, Mr. George (Les Tremayne), who died. Mr. George remains present for her like a guardian angel. Priscilla has inherited property and a large sum of money that her three greedy Leggett cousins, Edna (Virginia Gregg), Jared (Howard Freeman), and Adelaide (Lillian Bronson), are after. The cousins plot an accidental death for Priscilla, but Mr. George's voice and guidance from beyond steers Priscilla away from peril. Also starring: Laura Craig (Joan Tompkins) and Mrs. Noonan (Ruth Perrott).
33	33	"The Terror in Teakwood"	Paul Henreid	Teleplay by : Alan Caillou; Based on a short story by : Harold Lawlor	May 16, 1961
A concert pianist, Vladimir Vicek (Guy Rolfe), obsessively covets the skills of a rival, Carnowitz. When Carnowitz dies, Vladimir and an associate, Gafke (Reggie Nalder), desecrate his grave to steal his large hands, in order to play a concerto specifically made for someone with large hands. Also starring: Leonie (Hazel Court), Jerry Welch (Charles Aidman), Papa Glockstein (Vladimir Sokoloff), and Sylvia Slattery (Linda Watkins).
34	34	"Prisoner in the Mirror"	Herschel Daugherty	Robert Arthur, Jr.	May 23, 1961
Professor Harry Langham (Lloyd Bochner) is writing his thesis on 18th-century magician/sorcerer, Count Cagliostro (Henry Daniell), and goes to France to buy a mirror the Cagliostro once owned that has its glass painted over. Cagliostro is supernaturally trapped in the mirror and wants to use Harry's body to live again. Also starring: Kay Forrest (Marion Ross), Fred Forrest (Jack Mullaney), Yvette Dulaine (Patricia Michon), Marquis Robert de Chanteney (David Frankham), Prof. Thibault (Peter Brocco), Laura (Pamela Curran), Police Sgt. Burke (Walter Reed), Marie Blanchard (Erika Peters), Monsieur Armand (Louis Mercier), and De Chanteney's mother (Frieda Inescort).
35	35	"Dark Legacy"	John Brahm	John Tomerlin	May 30, 1961
A magician, Mario Asparos (Harry Townes), uses a book he inherited from his dead uncle, Radan, to invoke a demon, despite his wife Monika (Ilka Windish) and his friend Toby Wolfe (Henry Silva) trying to stop him. Also starring: Pinchot (Alan Napier), Lars Eisenhart (Richard Hale), Mrs. Edith Pringle (Doris Lloyd), and Vince Fennaday (Ned Glass).
36	36	"Pigeons from Hell"	John Newland	Teleplay by : John Kneubuhl; Based on the short story by : Robert E. Howard	June 6, 1961
Brothers Timothy (Brandon deWilde) and Johnny Branner (David Whorf) break down in their car in the Deep South. As they go to look for help, Johnny is caught in a flock of pigeons. They stumble onto the Blassenville plantation, and decide to spend the night there. Johnny becomes entranced by an unseen force and he goes after Timothy with a hatchet. Timothy runs from the house and passes out, and is found by a hunter Jacob Blount (Ken Renard), who summons Sheriff Buckner (Crahan Denton). Timothy explains what he saw, saying he believes Johnny is dead. Buckner takes Timothy back to investigate the house and find a dark and supernatural family secret. Also starring: Howard (Guy Wilkerson) and Eula Lee Blassenville (Ottola Nesmith). This episode is the first-ever screen adaptation of a work by Robert E. Howard.
37	37	"The Grim Reaper"	Herschel Daugherty	Teleplay by : Robert Bloch; Based on a short story by : Harold Lawlor	June 13, 1961
Beatrice Graves (Natalie Schafer) causes concern for her nephew, Paul (William Shatner) when she buys an old painting of The Grim Reaper, thought to be connected to the mysterious deaths of its previous owners. Beatrice ignores this concern, but then sees evidence for herself that it may be true. Also starring: Pierre Radin (Henry Daniell), Dorothy Lyndon (Elizabeth Allen), Gerald Keller (Scott Merrill), Toinette (Fifi D'Orsay), Sgt. Bernstein (Paul Newlan), and Mr. Phillips (Robert Cornthwaite).

=== Season 2 (1961–62) ===
The second season of Thriller started on September 18, 1961, with the episode "What Beckoning Ghost?" and had 30 episodes in the season (in addition to serving as the host of the series, Karloff starred in four episodes in the 2nd season: "The Premature Burial," "The Last of the Sommervilles," "Dialogues With Death," and "The Incredible Doctor Markesan").

No. overall	No. in season	Title	Directed by	Written by	Original release date
38	1	"What Beckoning Ghost?"	Ida Lupino	Story and Teleplay : Donald S. Sanford; Based on the magazine story by : Harold Lawlor	September 18, 1961
A wealthy, aging, concert pianist, Mildred Adler Beaumont (Judith Evelyn) has a vision of herself in a coffin, with organ music in the background. She is unable to convince her husband, Eric (Tom Helmore), and her sister Lydia Adler (Adele Mara) of what she has seen, and uncovers a sinister plot against her. Also starring: The Detective (Frank Wilcox)
39	2	"Guillotine"	Ida Lupino	Teleplay by : Charles Beaumont; Based on the short story by : Cornell Woolrich	September 25, 1961
In 1875 France, Robert Lamont (Alejandro Rey) is convicted of murder and is set for execution by the guillotine, but he has discovered a loophole that could help him avoid death if his executioner, Monsieur de Paris (Robert Middleton), were to die before he can be executed. Robert comes up with a plan and enlists his wife, Babette (Danielle De Metz), as an accomplice. Also starring: Madame LeClerc (Janine Grandel) and Louis (Peter Camlin).
40	3	"The Premature Burial"	Douglas Heyes	Story by : Douglas Heyes, from the works of Edgar Allan Poe; Teleplay by : William D. Gordon	October 2, 1961
Edward Stapleton (Sidney Blackmer) is a cataleptic millionaire who survives having been buried alive. His loyal long time doctor, Dr. Thorne (Boris Karloff), helps him take precautions to avoid death again. Edward finds himself a scheming bride, Victorine Lafourcade (Patricia Medina), who plans to eliminate him for good so she can run off with his money, and her lover, Julian Boucher (Scott Marlowe). Also starring: Dr. March (William D. Gordon), Housekeeper (Lilian O'Malley), Butler (Pat O'Malley) and Friar (Richard Flato).
41	4	"The Weird Tailor"	Herschel Daugherty	Teleplay by : Robert Bloch; Based on his short story	October 16, 1961
Mr. Smith (George Macready) loses his son in a supernatural incident; he seeks out a copy of the evil book De Vermis Mysteriis (Mysteries of the Worm) and finds a way to bring him back -- but he needs the services of tailor Erik Borg (Henry Jones) to accomplish his goal. The first Cthulhu Mythos story on television: the demon Tsathoggua, from Clark Ashton Smith's stories, and De Vermis Mysteriis from Robert Bloch's Mythos tales are referenced in the episode.
42	5	"God Grante That She Lye Stille"	Herschel Daugherty	Teleplay by : Robert Hardy Andrews; Based on the short story by : Lady Cynthia Asquith	October 23, 1961
Cast: Boris Karloff, Ronald Howard, and Sarah Marshall
43	6	"Masquerade"	Herschel Daugherty	Teleplay by : Donald S. Sanford; Based on the short story by : Henry Kuttner	October 30, 1961
Cast: Boris Karloff, Elizabeth Montgomery, and Tom Poston
44	7	"The Last of the Sommervilles"	Ida Lupino	Ida Lupino & R.M.H. Lupino	November 6, 1961
Cast: Boris Karloff, Peter Walker, Chet Stratton, Phyllis Thaxter, and Martita Hunt
45	8	"Letter to a Lover"	Herschel Daugherty	Teleplay by : Donald S. Sanford; Based on the play by : Sheridan Gibney	November 13, 1961
Cast: Boris Karloff, Ann Todd and Murray Matheson
46	9	"A Third for Pinochle"	Herschel Daugherty	Mark Hanna and Boris Sobelman	November 20, 1961
Cast: Boris Karloff, Edward Andrews, and Doro Merande
47	10	"The Closed Cabinet"	Ida Lupino	Teleplay by : Kay Lenard & Jess Carneol	November 27, 1961
Cast: Boris Karloff, Olive Sturgess, and David Frankham
48	11	"Dialogues with Death"	Herschel Daugherty	Teleplay by : Robert Arthur, Jr.	December 4, 1961
Cast: Boris Karloff, Norma Crane, and Ed Nelson
49	12	"The Return of Andrew Bentley"	John Newland	Teleplay by : Richard Matheson; Based on the short story by : August Derleth and Mark Schorer	December 11, 1961
Cast: Boris Karloff, John Newland, Antoinette Bower, Terence De Marney
50	13	"The Remarkable Mrs. Hawk"	John Brahm	Television Story and Teleplay: Donald S. Sanford; Based on a short story by: Margaret St. Clair	December 18, 1961
Cast: Boris Karloff, Jo Van Fleet, and John Carradine
51	14	"Portrait Without a Face"	John Newland	Jason Wingreen	December 25, 1961
Cast: Boris Karloff, Jane Greer, and Robert Webber
52	15	"An Attractive Family"	John Brahm	Teleplay by : Robert Arthur, Jr. Based on his short story	January 1, 1962
Cast: Boris Karloff, Richard Long, and Leo G. Carroll
53	16	"Waxworks"	Herschel Daugherty	Teleplay by : Robert Bloch; Based on his short story	January 8, 1962
Cast: Boris Karloff, Oskar Homolka, and Martin Kosleck
54	17	"La Strega"	Ida Lupino	Alan Caillou	January 15, 1962
Cast: Boris Karloff, Ursula Andress, and Alejandro Rey
55	18	"The Storm"	Herschel Daugherty	Teleplay by : William D. Gordon; Based on the short story by : McKnight Malmar	January 22, 1962
Cast: Boris Karloff, Nancy Kelly, and David McLean
56	19	"A Wig for Miss Devore"	John Brahm	Television Story and Teleplay: Donald S. Sanford; Based on the short story by: August Derleth	January 29, 1962
Cast: Boris Karloff, Patricia Barry, and John Baragrey
57	20	"The Hollow Watcher"	William F. Claxton	Jay Simms	February 12, 1962
Cast: Boris Karloff, Audrey Dalton, Sean McClory and Warren Oates
58	21	"Cousin Tundifer"	John Brahm	Boris Sobelman	February 19, 1962
Cast: Boris Karloff, Edward Andrews, and Sue Ane Langdon
59	22	"The Incredible Doktor Markesan"	Robert Florey	Teleplay by : Donald S. Sanford; Based on the short story by : August Derleth and Mark Schorer	February 26, 1962
Cast: Boris Karloff, Dick York, and Carolyn Kearney
60	23	"Flowers of Evil"	John Brahm	Teleplay by : Barré Lyndon; Based on a short story by : Hugh Walpole	March 5, 1962
Cast: Boris Karloff, Luciana Paluzzi, and Kevin Hagen
61	24	"'Til Death Do Us Part"	Herschel Daugherty	Teleplay by : Robert Bloch; Based on his short story	March 12, 1962
Cast: Boris Karloff, Henry Jones (actor) and Jim Davis
62	25	"The Bride Who Died Twice"	Ida Lupino	Robert Hardy Andrews	March 19, 1962
Cast: Boris Karloff, Mala Powers, and Eduardo Ciannelli
63	26	"Kill My Love"	Herschel Daugherty	Teleplay by : Donald S. Sanford; Based on the novel by : Kyle Hunt	March 26, 1962
Cast: Boris Karloff, Richard Carlson, and Patricia Breslin
64	27	"Man of Mystery"	John Newland	Teleplay by : Robert Bloch	April 2, 1962
Cast: Boris Karloff, Mary Tyler Moore and John Van Dreelen
65	28	"The Innocent Bystanders"	John English	Robert Hardy Andrews	April 9, 1962
Cast: Boris Karloff, John Anderson, and George Kennedy
66	29	"The Lethal Ladies"	Ida Lupino	Teleplay by : Boris Sobelman; Based on short stories by : Joseph Payne Brennan	April 16, 1962
Cast: Boris Karloff, Howard Morris, and Rosemary Murphy
67	30	"The Specialists"	Ted Post	Teleplay by : John Kneubuhl; Based on a novel by : Gordon Ash	April 30, 1962
Cast: Boris Karloff, Lin McCarthy, and Robert Douglas

== Musical score ==
=== First soundtrack ===
The Original Music of Thriller

Soundtrack album by Pete Rugolo and His Orchestra
- Released: 1961
- Recorded: February 23 and 24, 1961; United Recording Studios, Hollywood, CA
- Genre: Jazz
- Labels: Time; 52034/S 2034
- Producer: Bob Shad

Pete Rugolo chronology
10 Trombones Like 2 Pianos (1960)	The Original Music of Thriller (1961)	Ten Trumpets and 2 Guitars (1960)

Each episode of the first season featured a specially composed score; the main theme and majority of writing was by Pete Rugolo, with additional compositions by Jerry Goldsmith and Morton Stevens. In 1961, The Original Music of Thriller, composed, arranged and conducted by Rugolo, was released on Bob Shad's Time label.

==== Track listing ====
All compositions by Pete Rugolo.

1. "Theme from "Thriller"" – 1:33
2. "The Hungry Glass" – 4:14
3. "Voodoo Man" – 2:55
4. "The Guilty Men" – 3:06
5. "Girl With a Secret" – 2:24
6. "The Purple Room" – 2:40
7. "Twisted Image" – 1:47
8. "Rose's Last Summer" – 2:42
9. "Worse Than Murder" – 2:04
10. "Child's Play" – 2:13
11. "Finger of Fear" – 3:31
12. "The Man in the Middle" – 2:55

==== Personnel ====
- Pete Rugolo – arranger, conductor
- Frank Beach, Don Fagerquist, Ollie Mitchell, Uan Rasey – trumpet
- Milt Bernhart, Dick Nash, Frank Rosolino – trombone
- George Roberts – bass trombone
- James Decker, Vincent DeRosa, Richard Perissi – French horn
- Gene Cipriano, Bob Cooper, Norman Herzberg, Harry Klee, Ronnie Lang, Bud Shank – piccolo, flute, bass flute, bass clarinet, alto saxophone, baritone saxophone, bassoon
- Red Callender – tuba
- Laurindo Almeida, Robert Bain – guitar
- Red Mitchell, Joe Mondragon – bass
- Caesar Giovannini, Jimmy Rowles – piano
- Jack Cookerly – organ
- Dorothy Remsen – harp
- Larry Bunker, Frank Flynn, Milt Holland, Louis Singer, Alvin Stoller – percussion, vibraphone, marimba, xylophone, timpani, congas, bongos, snare drum, bells, chimes, gong, triangle, temple blocks, jawbone, gourd, timbales, maracas
- Herman Clebanoff, Sam Freed, Benny Gill, Mort Herbert, Anatol Kaminsky, Nathan Kaproff, Lou Klass, Marvin Limonick, William Miller, Alexander Murray, Erno Neufeld, Irma Neumann, Jack Pepper, Lou Raderman, Ambrose Russo, Leon Trebacz – violin
- Justin Di Tullio, Armand Kaproff, Raphael Kramer, Edgar Lustgarten, Marie Manahan, Joseph Saxon, Harold Schneier, Eleanor Slatkin – cello

=== Second soundtrack ===
After a creative change during the first season, Rugolo was one of the crew to be removed (although his theme music was retained). Goldsmith and Stevens replaced him, scoring the rest of the run between them.

The British label Tadlow Music released two albums featuring several of Goldsmith's scores, re-recorded by City of Prague Philharmonic Orchestra and conducted by Nic Raine.

First Tadlow CD released in 2017:

1. The Grim Reaper – Prologue (1:49)
2. The Grim Reaper – Suite (7:22)
3. The Grim Reaper – End Titles (1:20)
4. Hay-Fork And Bill-Hook – Prologue (2:30)
5. Hay-Fork And Bill-Hook – Suite (6:15)
6. Hay-Fork And Bill-Hook – Finale (1:27)
7. Well Of Doom – Prologue (1:37)
8. Well Of Doom – Suite (8:42)
9. Well Of Doom – Reunited (0:55)
10. Mr. George – Prologue (1:29)
11. Mr. George – Suite (7:06)
12. Mr. George – The Swing (0:53)
13. The Poisoner – Prologue (1:06)
14. The Poisoner – Suite (8:22)
15. The Poisoner – End Titles (0:57)
16. Yours Truly, Jack The Ripper – Prologue (2:38)
17. Yours Truly, Jack The Ripper – Suite (6:51)
18. Yours Truly, Jack The Ripper – “Not John, Jack” (0:26)
19. End Titles – Suite (8:24)

Second Tadlow CD released in 2018:

1. GOD GRANTE THAT SHE LYE STILLE – Prologue / Roll Call (1:46)
2. GOD GRANTE THAT SHE LYE STILLE – Suite (13:53) Silly Dog / The Search / Apparition / Locked Doors / Historical Records / I’ve Won
3. THE BRIDE WHO DIED TWICE – Prologue / Roll Call (3:14)
4. THE BRIDE WHO DIED TWICE – Suite (6:46) Consuelo / Respect / Bad News / Wedding Guests / Shot
5. LATE DATE – Prologue / Roll Call (2:09)
6. LATE DATE – Suite (8:58) Aftermath / “It Was You” / The Plant / Confession
7. THE WEIRD TAILOR – Prologue / Roll Call (2:05)
8. THE WEIRD TAILOR – Suite (10:03) Finest Material / “Leave Me Alone” / Late Work / Delivery / The Freezer / “Not So Idle Hans”
9. MASQUERADE – Prologue / Roll Call (1:53)
10. MASQUERADE – Suite (10:38) Up the Stairs / Every Man for Himself / Spoil Sports! / Honeymooners / The Cellar / Escape / Coffin Made for Two
11. TERROR IN TEAKWOOD – Prologue / Roll Call (2:18)
12. TERROR IN TEAKWOOD – Suite (5:09) The Box / Ground Plaster Cast / Fist Fight
13. TERROR IN TEAKWOOD – Nocturne for Violin and Piano (4:30) Composed by Caesar Giovaninni Violin: Lucie Svehlova / Piano: Jaromir Klepac

== Award nominations ==
Year	Result	Award	Category	Recipient	Episode
1961	Nominated	Emmy Award	Outstanding Achievement in the Field of Music for Television	Pete Rugolo; Jerry Goldsmith	—
1962	Nominated	American Cinema Editors	Best Edited Television Program	Danny B. Landres	"Third for Pinochle"
1962	Nominated	Hugo Award	Best Dramatic Presentation	—	—

== Comic book ==
Gold Key Comics published a comic book version of Thriller, beginning in October 1962.

The title changed to Boris Karloff: Tales of Mystery after the TV series ended; the comic book series lasted until February 1980, long after the death of Karloff himself. George Wilson drew many of the covers for the comic book series. Dark Horse Comics published an archive reprint of the series beginning in 2009.

== Home media ==
On August 31, 2010, Image Entertainment released Thriller: The Complete Series on DVD in Region 1 and again in 2023 in Region 0, ie playable all around the world. The 14-disc set contains all 67 episodes, remastered and uncut, with new commentary tracks and separated music tracks.
