= Bud Shank Quartet Featuring Claude Williamson =

1957 jazz studio album

Studio album by Bud Shank Quartet Featuring Claude Williamson
- Released: 1957
- Recorded: November 7 & 8, 1956
- Studio: Capitol (Hollywood)
- Genre: Jazz
- Label: Pacific Jazz; PJ 1230
- Producer: Richard Bock

Bud Shank chronology
The Bud Shank Quartet (1956)	Bud Shank Quartet Featuring Claude Williamson (1957)	Theme Music from "The James Dean Story" (1956)

Professional ratings
Review scores
Source	Rating
Disc	3.5/5 stars

Bud Shank Quartet Featuring Claude Williamson is an album by Bud Shank recorded in November 1956 for the Pacific Jazz label.

== Track listing ==
1. "A Night in Tunisia" (Dizzy Gillespie, Frank Paparelli) - 4:01
2. "Tertia" (Claude Williamson) - 8:31
3. "All of You" (Cole Porter) - 6:02
4. "Theme" (Williamson) - 3:52
5. "Jive at Five" (Count Basie, Harry Edison) - 4:28
6. "Softly, as in a Morning Sunrise" (Oscar Hammerstein II, Sigmund Romberg) - 5:18
7. "Polka Dots and Moonbeams" (Jimmy Van Heusen, Johnny Burke) - 3:38
8. "The Lamp Is Low" (Peter DeRose, Bert Shefter, Mitchell Parish) - 6:09

== Personnel ==
- Bud Shank - alto saxophone, flute
- Claude Williamson - piano, celeste
- Don Prell - bass
- Chuck Flores - drums

== See also ==
- Cool jazz
