= Bud Shank – Shorty Rogers – Bill Perkins =

Studio album by Bud Shank with Shorty Rogers/Bill Perkins
- Released: 1955
- Recorded: March 25, 1954 and May 2, 1955
- Studio: United Western, Hollywood; Capitol Melrose Ave, Hollywood
- Genre: Jazz
- Label: Pacific Jazz; PJ 1205
- Producer: Richard Bock

Bud Shank chronology
Strings & Trombones (1955)	Bud Shank – Shorty Rogers – Bill Perkins (1955)	Jazz at Cal-Tech (1956)

Shorty Rogers chronology
Shorty Rogers Courts the Count (1954)	Bud Shank - Shorty Rogers - Bill Perkins (1955)	Collaboration (1954)

Bud Shank – Shorty Rogers – Bill Perkins is a Quintet album led by Bud Shank featuring Shorty Rogers or Bill Perkins which was recorded in 1954 and 1955 for the Pacific Jazz label.

== Reception ==
Professional ratings
Review scores
Source	Rating
AllMusic	3/5 stars

AllMusic rated the album with three stars.

== Track listing ==
All compositions by Shorty Rogers, except as indicated

1. "Shank's Pranks" - 3:12
2. "Casa de Luz" - 5:33
3. "Lotus Bud" - 3:21
4. "Left Bank" - 3:20
5. "Jasmine" - 4:08
6. "Just a Few" - 4:11
7. "Paradise" (Clifford Brown) - 3:03
8. "Fluted Columns" (Bud Shank) - 4:16
9. "I Hear Music" (Burton Lane, Frank Loesser) - 3:30
10. "Royal Garden Blues" (Clarence Williams, Spencer Williams) - 3:54
11. "A Sinner Kisses an Angel" (Mack David, Richard M. Jones, Ray Joseph) – 3:16
12. "It Had to Be You" (Isham Jones, Gus Kahn) - 3:13

== Personnel ==
- Bud Shank - alto saxophone, tenor saxophone, baritone saxophone, alto flute, flute
- Shorty Rogers - flugelhorn (tracks 1–6)
- Bill Perkins - alto saxophone, tenor saxophone, flute (tracks 7–12)
- Jimmy Rowles (tracks 1–6), Hampton Hawes (tracks 7–12) - piano
- Harry Babasin (tracks 1–6), Red Mitchell (tracks 7–12) - bass
- Roy Harte (tracks 1–6), Mel Lewis (tracks 7–12) - drums
