= Jazz at Cal-Tech =

Live album by Bud Shank Quartet with Bob Cooper
- Released: 1956
- Recorded: January 19, 1956; California Institute of Technology, Pasadena, CA
- Genre: Jazz
- Label: Pacific Jazz; PJ 1219
- Producer: Richard Bock

Bud Shank chronology
Bud Shank – Shorty Rogers – Bill Perkins (1954-55)	Jazz at Cal-Tech (1956)	The Bud Shank Quartet (1956)

Jazz at Cal-Tech is an album by saxophonist Bud Shank recorded in January 1956 for the Pacific Jazz label.

== Reception ==
Professional ratings
Review scores
Source	Rating
AllMusic	4/5 stars
Disc	3/5 stars

AllMusic's review by Jason Ankeney states: "The near-telepathic interplay that distinguishes all of Bud Shank's collaborations with reedist Bob Cooper reaches a dazzling peak with the live Jazz at Cal-Tech. A deceptively freewheeling set... it boasts a simmering intensity often missing from Shank and Cooper's subsequent studio sessions, channeling the energy of the audience to add a new edge to their creative give and take".

== Track listing ==
1. "When Lights are Low" (Benny Carter, Spencer Williams) – 7:30
2. "Old Devil Moon" (Burton Lane, Yip Harburg) - 6:38
3. "The Nearness of You" (Hoagy Carmichael, Ned Washington) - 4:07
4. "How Long Has This Been Going On?" (George Gershwin, Ira Gershwin) - 4:50
5. "Tea for Two" (Vincent Youmans, Irving Caesar) - 4:50
6. "Lullaby of Birdland" (George Shearing, George David Weiss) - 4:03
7. "Somebody Loves Me" (George Gershwin, Ballard MacDonald, Buddy DeSylva) - 5:38
8. "Moonlight in Vermont" (Karl Suessdorf, John Blackburn) - 6:20
9. "The King" (Count Basie) - 6:09

== Personnel ==
- Bud Shank - alto saxophone, flute
- Bob Cooper - tenor saxophone, oboe
- Claude Williamson - piano
- Don Prell - bass
- Chuck Flores - drums
