= Theme Music from "The James Dean Story" =

Soundtrack album by Chet Baker and Bud Shank
- Released: 1957
- Recorded: November 8, 1956; Radio Recorders, Hollywood, California
- Genre: Jazz
- Length: 42:12
- Label: World Pacific; P 2005
- Producer: Richard Bock

Chet Baker chronology
Quartet: Russ Freeman/Chet Baker (1956)	Theme Music from "The James Dean Story" (1957)	Reunion with Chet Baker (1957)

Bud Shank chronology
Bud Shank Quartet Featuring Claude Williamson (1956)	Theme Music from "The James Dean Story" (1956)	Flute 'n Oboe (1956)

Theme Music from "The James Dean Story" is a 1956 soundtrack album to the James Dean biopic, The James Dean Story composed by Leith Stevens and featuring trumpeter Chet Baker and saxophonist Bud Shank.

== Reception ==
Professional ratings
Review scores
Source	Rating
Allmusic	2.5/5 stars
The Penguin Guide to Jazz Recordings	3/4 stars

Lindsay Planer of Allmusic states, "the vast majority of the material is little more than ersatz-cool filler, bearing little distinction. From an historical perspective this seems almost criminal, especially in light of the inordinate talent corralled for the project".

== Track listing ==
All compositions by Leith Stevens except as indicated

1. "Jimmy's Theme" - 2:52
2. "The Search" - 4:43
3. "Lost Love" - 3:39
4. "People" - 3:35
5. "The Movie Star" - 3:36
6. "Fairmont, Indiana" - 4:34
7. "Rebel at Work" - 3:44
8. "Success and Then What" - 3:58
9. "Let Me Be Loved" (Ray Evans, Jay Livingston) - 4:11
10. "Hollywood" - 5:06
11. "Let Me Be Loved" [Vocal Version] (Evans, Livingston) - 2:14

== Personnel ==
- Chet Baker - trumpet, vocal (track 11)
- Bud Shank - alto saxophone, flute
- Don Fagerquist, Ray Linn - trumpet (tracks 1, 2, 4–6 & 8–11)
- Milt Bernhart - trombone (tracks 1, 2 & 4–11)
- Charlie Mariano, Richie Steward - alto saxophone (tracks 1, 2, 4–6 & 8–11)
- Bill Holman, Richie Kamuca - tenor saxophone (tracks 1, 2, 4–6 & 8–11)
- Pepper Adams - baritone saxophone (tracks 1, 2, 4–6 & 8–11)
- Claude Williamson - piano (tracks 1–6 & 8–11)
- Monty Budwig - bass (tracks 1–6 & 8–11)
- Mel Lewis - drums
- Mike Pacheco - bongos (tracks 1, 2, 4–6 & 8–11)
