= Rugolo Plays Kenton =

Studio album by Pete Rugolo and His Orchestra
- Released: 1958
- Recorded: October 25–26 and November 24, 1958; Los Angeles
- Genre: Jazz
- Label: EmArcy; MG 36143/SR 60205

Pete Rugolo chronology
Percussion at Work (1957)	Rugolo Plays Kenton (1958)	The Music from Richard Diamond (1959)

Rugolo Plays Kenton (subtitled The Pete Rugolo Orchestra Plays Compositions Introduced by Stan Kenton) is an album by composer, arranger and conductor Pete Rugolo featuring performances of tunes associated with Stan Kenton recorded in 1958 and first released on the Mercury label.

== Reception ==
Professional ratings
Review scores
Source	Rating
Allmusic	4/5 stars

The Allmusic review by Scott Yanow noted: "Since Pete Rugolo came to fame for his many arrangements for the Stan Kenton Orchestra and this was one of his last important jazz albums before he became largely a full-time writer for the studios, it seems only proper that the date finds Rugolo paying tribute to his former boss. ... Rugolo does not merely re-create the past but instead comes up with fresh variations".

== Track listing ==
All compositions by Stan Kenton except where noted.

1. "Eager Beaver" - 3:00
2. "Painted Rhythm" - 3:46
3. "Minor Riff" (Kenton, Rugolo) - 2:34
4. "Concerto for Doghouse" - 2:43
5. "Sunset Tower" - 2:27
6. "Concerto to End All Concertos" - 5:21
7. "Artistry in Rhythm" - 3:50
8. "Southern Scandal" - 3:22
9. "Opus in Pastels" - 3:02
10. "Theme to the West" (Kenton, Rugolo) - 2:54
11. "Artistry in Boogie" (Kenton, Rugolo) - 3:59
12. "Capitol Punishment" (Kenton, Rugolo) - 2:24
- Recorded in Los Angeles, CA on October 25, 1958 (tracks 1, 7 & 12), October 26, 1958 (tracks 2, 3, 6, 8 & 11), and November 24, 1958 (tracks 4, 5, 9 & 10).

== Personnel ==
- Pete Rugolo - arranger, conductor
- Buddy Childers, Don Fagerquist, Ollie Mitchell, Al Porcino - trumpet
- Milt Bernhart, Harry Betts (tracks 1, 7 & 12), Dick Nash (tracks 2–6 & 8–11), Frank Rosolino, Kenny Shroyer - trombone
- Red Callender - tuba
- Harry Klee, Bud Shank - alto saxophone, flute
- Bob Cooper - tenor saxophone, oboe
- Dave Pell - tenor saxophone, clarinet
- Chuck Gentry - baritone saxophone, bass clarinet
- Claude Williamson - piano
- Howard Roberts - guitar
- Don Bagley - bass
- Shelly Manne - drums
