= The Bud Shank Quartet =

Studio album by Bud Shank
- Released: 1956
- Recorded: January 25, 1956
- Studio: Capitol, Melrose Ave (Hollywood)
- Genre: Jazz
- Label: Pacific Jazz; PJ 1215
- Producer: Richard Bock

Bud Shank chronology
Jazz at Cal-Tech (1956)	The Bud Shank Quartet (1956)	Bud Shank Quartet Featuring Claude Williamson (1956)

The Bud Shank Quartet is an album by Bud Shank recorded in January 1956 for the Pacific Jazz label.

== Track listing ==
1. "Bag of Blues" (Bob Cooper) - 6:47
2. "Nature Boy" (eden ahbez) - 4:25
3. "All This and Heaven Too" (Block-Davis, Miller) - 4:50
4. "Jubilation" (Cooper) - 5:43
5. "Do Nothing till You Hear from Me" (Duke Ellington, Bob Russell) - 5:34
6. "Nocturne for Flute" (Claude Williamson) - 2:45
7. "Walkin'" (Richard Carpenter) - 9:35
8. "Carioca" (Vincent Youmans, Edward Eliscu and Gus Kahn) - 4:54

== Personnel ==
- Bud Shank - alto saxophone, flute
- Claude Williamson - piano
- Don Prell - bass
- Chuck Flores - drums
