= Mannix (album) =

Soundtrack album by Lalo Schifrin
- Released: 1969
- Recorded: October 1968; Los Angeles, California
- Genre: Jazz
- Length: 30:19
- Label: Paramount; PAS 5004
- Producer: Tom Mack

Lalo Schifrin chronology
More Mission: Impossible (1968)	Mannix (1969)	Bullitt (1968)

Mannix (subtitled Themes from the Original Score of the Paramount Television Show) is an album featuring music composed and conducted by Lalo Schifrin which was recorded in 1968 and released on the Paramount label. As with Music from Mission: Impossible (1967) and More Mission: Impossible the music on this album is rerecorded and extended scores that were originally commissioned for the TV series Mannix.

== Track listing ==
All compositions by Lalo Schifrin except as indicated

1. "Mannix" - 2:29
2. "The Edge of Night" - 2:53
3. "The Girl Who Came in with the Tide" - 2:26
4. "Beyond the Shadow of Today" (Schifrin, Herb Geller) - 2:57
5. "The Shadow" - 3:03
6. "Turn Every Stone" (Shorty Rogers) - 2:59
7. "Hunt Down" - 2:20
8. 'Warning: Live Blueberries" - 3:29
9. "Fear" - 2:39
10. "The End of the Rainbow" - 2:36
11. "Endgame" - 2:28
- Recorded in Los Angeles, California in October 1968

== Personnel ==
- Lalo Schifrin - arranger, conductor
- Conte Candoli, Graham Young, John Audino, Bobby Bryant - trumpet, flugelhorn
- Lloyd Ulyate, Dick Nash, Milt Bernhart, George Roberts - trombone
- Bud Shank, Ronny Lang, Plas Johnson, Jack Nimitz, Gene Cipriano - reeds
- Mike Melvoin - piano, electric piano, organ
- Tommy Tedesco, Howard Roberts - guitar
- Carol Kaye - guitar, electric bass
- Max Bennett - bass
- Larry Bunker, Ken Watson, Emil Richards, Francisco Aguabella, percussion
- Robert Helfer - orchestra manager
- Dick Hazard, Milt Rogers - arranger
