= The Music from Richard Diamond =

Studio album by Pete Rugolo and His Orchestra
- Released: 1959
- Recorded: March 10 & 31 and April 9, 1959
- Studio: United Recording Studios, Hollywood, CA
- Genre: Jazz
- Label: EmArcy; MG 36162/SR 80045

Pete Rugolo chronology
Rugolo Plays Kenton (1958)	The Music from Richard Diamond (1959)	Behind Brigitte Bardot (1959)

The Music from Richard Diamond is an album by composer, arranger and conductor Pete Rugolo featuring compositions written for Richard Diamond, Private Detective recorded in 1959 and first released on the EmArcy label.

Professional ratings
Review scores
Source	Rating
Allmusic	2/5 stars

== Track listing ==
All compositions by Pete Rugolo.

1. "Richard Diamond Theme" - 1:43
2. "Diamond On the Move"- 2:35
3. "Fancy Meeting Karen (Love Theme from Richard Diamond)" - 3:26
4. "I'm Always Chasing Butterflies" - 2:16
5. "Who's Sam?" - 2:25
6. "All Star" - 2:36
7. "The Teaser" - 1:30
8. "Ye Olde Curiosity Shape" - 3:29
9. "Teen Age Rock" - 2:07
10. "The Sleeve Job" - 2:10
11. "Does Mama Know You're Out?" - 2:10
12. "Richard Diamond's Blues" - 2:47
- Recorded at United Recording Studios in Hollywood, CA on March 10, 1959 (tracks 1, 3, 9 & 12), March 31, 1959 (tracks 5, 6, 8 & 10) and April 9, 1959 (tracks 2, 4, 7 & 11).

== Personnel ==
- Pete Rugolo - arranger, conductor
- Pete Candoli (tracks 1, 3, 5, 6, 9–10 & 12), Buddy Childers (tracks 2, 4–8, 10 & 11), Don Fagerquist (tracks 5, 6, 8 & 10), Ray Linn (tracks 2, 4, 7 & 11), Mickey Mangano (tracks 2, 4, 7 & 11), Ollie Mitchell (tracks 1, 3, 9 & 12), Jimmy Salko (tracks 2, 4, 7 & 11), Joe Triscari (tracks 1, 3, 5, 6, 9–10 & 12), Stu Williamson (tracks 1, 3, 9 & 12) - trumpet
- Milt Bernhart (tracks 1, 3, 5, 6, 9–10 & 12), Francis "Joe" Howard (tracks 1–4, 7, 9, 11 & 12), Frank Rosolino - trombone
- George Roberts - bass trombone
- Vincent DeRosa (tracks 5, 6, 8 & 10), Claude Sherry (tracks 2, 4, 7 & 11) - French horn
- Paul Horn, Bud Shank - piccolo, flute, alto saxophone
- Buddy Collette - tenor saxophone, clarinet, flute (tracks 2, 4, 7 & 11)
- Bob Cooper - tenor saxophone, bass clarinet, flute
- Chuck Gentry (tracks 1, 3, 9 & 12), Dale Issenhuth (tracks 2 4–8, 10 & 11) - baritone saxophone
- Larry Bunker - vibraphone, percussion, bongos, xylophone (tracks 2, 4–8, 10 & 11)
- Bernie Mattison - vibraphone, percussion (tracks 1, 3, 9 & 12)
- Jimmy Rowles - piano
- Al Viola - guitar
- Edgar Lustgarten - cello
- Rollie Bundock (tracks 2, 4, 7 & 11), Red Mitchell (tracks 1, 3, 5, 6, 9–10 & 12), Phil Stephens (tracks 2, 4–8, 10 & 11) - bass
- Irving Kluger (tracks 2, 4, 7 & 11), Shelly Manne (tracks 1, 3, 5, 6, 9–10 & 12), - drums
