= Lighthouse Café =

Hermosa Beach, California jazz nightclub since 1949

Coordinates: 33.850°N 118.420°W

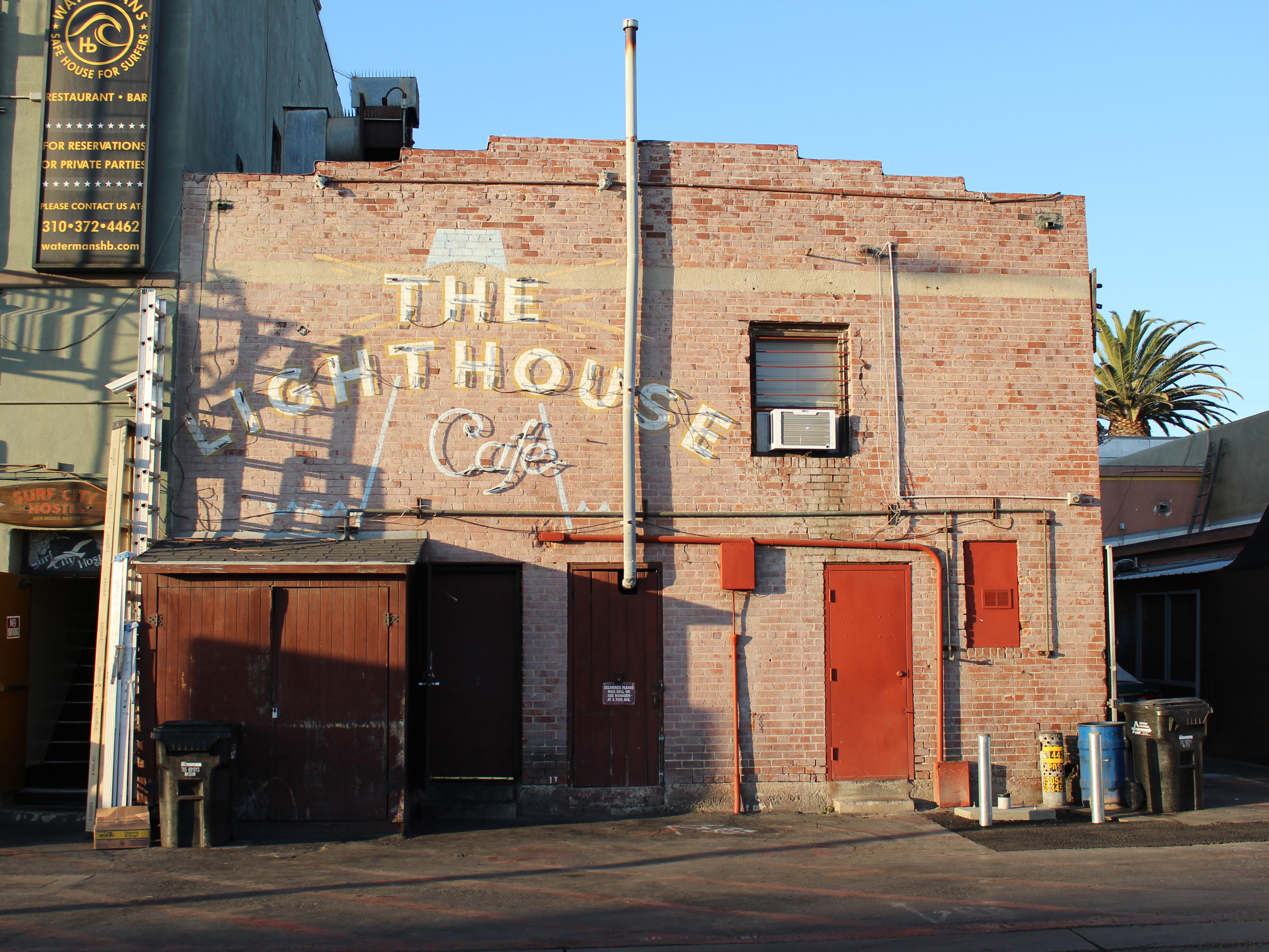
- Back of Lighthouse Café (featured in the film La La Land)
- Interactive map of Lighthouse Café
- Address: 30 Pier Ave; Hermosa Beach, California; United States

The Lighthouse Café is a nightclub located at 30 Pier Avenue in Hermosa Beach, California. It has been active as a jazz showcase since 1949 and, under the name "The Lighthouse", was one of the best known West Coast jazz clubs from the 1950s through the late 1970s. In addition to jazz, reggae to rock - among other genres of music - are performed at the venue, including bookings of local artists such as Jett Prescott and George Stanford.

== History ==
A restaurant called "Verpilate's" was built a short walk from the ocean at 30 Pier Avenue in 1934, and it was converted into "The Lighthouse", a bar, in 1940 ("Café" was added to the official name only when the business was sold in 1981). The club first began showcasing jazz music on May 29, 1949, when owner John Levine permitted bassist/band leader Howard Rumsey to start a recurring Sunday jam session on a trial basis. The experiment was a success. Rumsey became club manager soon after and put together a house band called the Lighthouse All-Stars.

While the club also hosted visiting groups, the Lighthouse All-Stars became an ensemble in its own right, which had among its guest musicians Chet Baker, Gerry Mulligan and Miles Davis. The longest-running members of the Lighthouse All-Stars were Bob Cooper (tenor saxophone), Conte Candoli (trumpet), and Stan Levey (drums).

West Coast jazz stalwarts Shorty Rogers, Richie Kamuca, Bill Holman, Bud Shank, Shelly Manne, and Jimmy Giuffre were also regulars in the early days. Max Roach was the regular drummer for a while in 1953. The club also became an important venue for recordings; Art Pepper, Lee Morgan, Cannonball Adderley, Mose Allison, Ramsey Lewis, Art Blakey, Charles Earland, Grant Green, Elvin Jones, Cal Tjader, the Modern Jazz Quartet, The Three Sounds, the Jazz Crusaders, and Joe Henderson all made recordings there.

"The Lighthouse" sponsored an inter-collegiate jazz festival in the late-1950s, and the competition's winners included Mike Melvoin and Les McCann.

John Levine died in 1970, and his family sold the club to Rudy Onderwyzer, manager and part-owner of Shelly Manne's club, "Shelly's Manne-Hole". Rumsey left "The Lighthouse" in 1971 to open the "Concerts By The Sea" jazz club in nearby Redondo Beach, and Onderwyzer sold the club again in 1981. The new owners remodeled it and mostly discontinued the jazz-music policy. From the mid-1990s, jazz slowly began to come back to the club, first on Sunday afternoons, then on a two-days-a-week schedule, with local artists such as Ray Pizzi, Michele Faber, and Edmond Allmond.

== Recordings made at the Lighthouse ==
- 1951: Art Pepper and Shorty Rogers – Popo (Xanadu, 1980)
- 1952: Art Pepper – Early Days, Vol. 1 (Vantage, 1991)
- 1953: Stan Getz – The Lighthouse Sessions, Vol. 1 (Norma/Vantage, 1991)
- 1953: Howard Rumsey's Lighthouse All-Stars – Sunday Jazz a la Lighthouse (Vol. 1 & Vol. 2) (Contemporary, 1953)
- 1953: Chet Baker and the Lighthouse All-Stars – Witch Doctor (Contemporary, 1985)
- 1953: Miles Davis and the Lighthouse All-Stars – At Last! (Contemporary, 1985) – recorded on the same day as Witch Doctor
- 1958–60: Joe Gordon and Scott LaFaro – West Coast Days (Fresh Sound, 1992)
- 1960: Cannonball Adderley – The Cannonball Adderley Quintet at the Lighthouse (Riverside, 1960)
- 1962: The Jazz Crusaders – The Jazz Crusaders at the Lighthouse (Pacific Jazz, 1962)
- 1962: Curtis Amy – Tippin' on Through (Pacific Jazz, 1962)
- 1964: Cannonball Adderley – Live Session! Cannonball Adderley with the New Exciting Voice of Ernie Andrews! with Ernie Andrews (Capitol, 1964)
- 1965: Ramsey Lewis Trio – Hang On Ramsey! (Cadet, 1965)
- 1965: Mose Allison – Mose Alive! (Atlantic, 1966)
- 1966: Art Blakey and the New Jazz Messengers – Buttercorn Lady (Limelight, 1966)
- 1966: The Jazz Crusaders – Live at the Lighthouse '66 (Pacific Jazz, 1966)
- 1967: The Modern Jazz Quartet – Live at the Lighthouse (Atlantic, 1967)
- 1967: The Three Sounds – Live at the Lighthouse (Blue Note, 1967)
- 1967: The Jazz Crusaders – Lighthouse '68 (Pacific Jazz, 1969) – reissued as Live Sides (Blue Note, 1980)
- 1969: Cal Tjader – Cal Tjader Plugs In (Skye, 1969)
- 1969: Richard "Groove" Holmes – X-77: Richard "Groove" Holmes Recorded Live at the Lighthouse (World Pacific, 1969)
- 1969: The Jazz Crusaders – Lighthouse '69 (Pacific Jazz, 1969)
- 1970: Lee Morgan – Live at the Lighthouse (Blue Note, 1971)
- 1970: Joe Henderson – If You're Not Part of the Solution, You're Part of the Problem (Milestone, 1970)
- 1972: Charles Earland – Live at the Lighthouse (Prestige, 1972)
- 1972: Grant Green – Live at the Lighthouse (Blue Note, 1973)
- 1972: Elvin Jones – Live at the Lighthouse (Blue Note, 1973)
- 1972: Ramsey Lewis – The Groover (Cadet)
- 1974: Ramsey Lewis – Solid Ivory (Cadet)
- 1979: Horace Tapscott Sextet – Lighthouse 79, Vol. 1 (Nimbus West)
- 1979: Horace Tapscott Sextet – Lighthouse 79, Vol. 2 (Nimbus West)
- 1981: Joe Farrell Quartet – Last of the Lighthouse (Unreleased)
- 1989: Howard Rumsey's Lighthouse All-Stars – Jazz Invention (40th Anniversary Reunion Concert) (Contemporary)
- 1999: Phil Norman Tentet – Live at the Lighthouse, Hermosa Beach, California (Sea Breeze)
- 2003: Sunday Afternoons at The Lighthouse Cafe: The Jack Nimitz Quintet (Woofy Productions)
- 2004: Sunday Afternoons at The Lighthouse Cafe: The Arno Marsh Quintet (Woofy Productions)
- 2004: Sunday Afternoons at The Lighthouse Cafe: The Bob Enevoldsen Quintet (Woofy Productions)
- 2004: Sunday Afternoons at The Lighthouse Cafe: The Med Flory Quintet (Woofy Productions)
- 2004: Sunday Afternoons at The Lighthouse Cafe: The Lennie Niehaus Octet (Woofy Productions)
- 2005: Sunday Afternoons at The Lighthouse Cafe: The Dave Pell Octet (Woofy Productions)
- 2005: Sunday Afternoons at The Lighthouse Cafe: The Jack Sheldon Quintet (Woofy Productions)
- 2007: Sunday Afternoons at The Lighthouse Cafe: Andy Martin/Scott Whitfield Quintet – A Tribute To Carl Fontana, Set 1 (Woofy Productions)
- 2007: Sunday Afternoons at The Lighthouse Cafe: Andy Martin/Scott Whitfield Quintet – A Tribute To Carl Fontana, Set 2 (Woofy Productions)

== Filming location ==
Film

- Sideout (1990)
- La La Land (2016)

== Filmography ==
- 2005: Jazz on the West Coast: The Lighthouse (RoseKing Productions, Kenneth Koenig) -DVD-

== See also ==
- List of jazz clubs
