= Slippery When Wet (Bud Shank album) =

Soundtrack album by Bud Shank
- Released: 1959
- Recorded: April 18, 1959; World Pacific Studios, Hollywood, CA
- Genre: Jazz
- Label: World Pacific; WP 1265
- Producer: Richard Bock

Bud Shank chronology
I'll Take Romance (1958)	Slippery When Wet (1959)	Koto & Flute (1960)

Slippery When Wet is a soundtrack album to Bruce Brown's 1959 surf film of the same name by saxophonist Bud Shank released on the World Pacific label.

== Reception ==
Professional ratings
Review scores
Source	Rating
AllMusic	3/5 stars

AllMusic rated the album with 3 stars.

== Track listing ==
All compositions by Bud Shank.

1. "Mook's Theme" - 4:32
2. "Surf Pipers" - 3:32
3. "The Surf and I" - 3:06
4. "Up in Velseyland" - 3:23
5. "Surf for Two" - 3:39
6. "Slippery When Wet" - 2:36
7. "Going My Wave" - 3:10
8. "Old King Nep's Tune" - 3:43
9. "Walkin' on the Water" - 4:42
10. "Soupsville" - 3:34

== Personnel ==
- Bud Shank - alto saxophone, flute
- Billy Bean - guitar
- Gary Peacock - bass
- Chuck Flores - drums
