= Bullitt (soundtrack) =

Soundtrack album by Lalo Schifrin
- Released: 1969
- Recorded: 1968 Hollywood, California
- Genres: Film score, jazz fusion
- Length: 32:51
- Label: Warner Bros. (WS 1777)
- Producer: Jimmy Hilliard

Lalo Schifrin chronology
Mannix (1968)	Bullitt (1969)	Che! (1969)

Professional ratings
Review scores
Source	Rating
Allmusic	4.5/5 stars
Uncut	2/5 stars

Bullitt is a soundtrack album to the motion picture Bullitt, by Argentine composer, pianist and conductor Lalo Schifrin, recorded in 1968 and released on the Warner Bros. label. The tracks released on the album are alternate versions of those heard in the film and were re-recorded at the film producers' insistence for a more "pop" oriented soundtrack.

== Reception ==
The Allmusic review states "Everything on the album is visually evocative the way good soundtrack music should be, yet the individual cuts are tight and melodic enough to hold up to repeated listens. The end result is a soundtrack that succeeds both as a film score and a stand-alone album. This unique combination makes Bullitt one of the finest achievements in the Lalo Schifrin catalog and one of the best action film scores ever written".

== Track listing ==
All compositions by Lalo Schifrin except as indicated

1. "Bullitt (Main Title)" (2:08)
2. "Room "26"" (2:23)
3. "Hotel Daniels" (2:53)
4. "The Aftermath of Love" (2:49)
5. "Music to Interrogate By" (2:50)
6. "On the Way to San Mateo" (2:31)
7. "Ice Pick Mike" (3:00)
8. "A Song for Cathy" (2:13)
9. "Shifting Gears" (3:17)
10. "Cantata for Combo" (3:05)
11. "The First Snowfall" (3:03) – Sonny Burke, Paul Francis Webster
12. "Bullitt (End Title)" (2:39)

== Recording ==
- Recorded in Hollywood, California on December 6 and 7, 1968.
- Personnel:
  - Lalo Schifrin – arranger, conductor
  - John Audino, Bud Brisbois, Tony Terran – trumpet, flugelhorn
  - Milt Bernhart, Dick Noel, Lloyd Ulyate, Lew McCreary – trombone
  - Bud Shank, Ronnie Lang, Gene Cipriano, Bill Perkins, Jack Nimitz – reeds
  - Mike Melvoin – piano, organ
  - Mike Deasy, Howard Roberts, Bob Bain – guitar
  - Ray Brown, Max Bennett – bass
  - Carol Kaye – electric bass
  - Stan Levey – drums
  - Larry Bunker – percussion
  - Unknown strings
  - Robert Helfer – orchestra manager
  - Dick Hazard, George Del Barrio – arranger

== Other versions ==
In 2000, the original movie arrangements were recreated by Schifrin in a recording session with the WDR Big Band in Cologne, Germany. This later version of the soundtrack also includes reconstructions of the 1968 soundtrack album arrangements for some tracks. The 2000 recreation can be identified from its track listing by the inclusion of the "Bullitt, Guitar Solo" track, a piece that does not appear in the film but which is inspired by the main Bullitt theme. The track listing of this release accidentally transposes "The Architect's Building" and "Song For Cathy".

The actual movie version of the music, from the recording sessions as heard in the film, was finally made available in 2009 by Film Score Monthly, which includes the 1968 soundtrack album version of the music.
