= I'll Take Romance =

Studio album by Bud Shank and the Len Mercer Strings
- Released: 1958
- Recorded: November 29, 1954 and April 4 & 5, 1958; Radio Recorders, Los Angeles, CA and Milan, Italy
- Genre: Jazz
- Label: World Pacific; WP 1251
- Producer: Richard Bock

Bud Shank chronology
Latin Contrasts (1958)	I'll Take Romance (1958)	Slippery When Wet (1959)

I'll Take Romance is an album by saxophonist Bud Shank released on the World Pacific label.

== Reception ==
Professional ratings
Review scores
Source	Rating
AllMusic	4/5 stars

In an AllMusic review by Jason Ankeney, he states: "Far removed from the sometimes bloodless sensibilities of the West Coast cool school, I'll Take Romance is as warm as its title portends. The string arrangements are sweet but never sentimental, boasting a sensitivity that colors but never overwhelms Shank's lyrical alto and flute".

== Track listing ==
1. "Smoke Gets in Your Eyes" (Jerome Kern, Otto Harbach) - 2:21
2. "Deep Purple" (Peter DeRose, Mitchell Parish) - 2:48
3. "Out of This World" (Harold Arlen, Johnny Mercer) - 2:03
4. "What a Difference a Day Made" (María Grever, Stanley Adams) - 2:54
5. "Embraceable You" (George Gershwin, Ira Gershwin) - 2:30
6. "I'll Take Romance" (Oscar Hammerstein II, Ben Oakland) - 1:56
7. "These Foolish Things" (Jack Strachey, Eric Maschwitz, Harry Link) - 2:31
8. "Someone to Watch Over Me" (George Gershwin, Ira Gershwin) - 3:43
9. "You Are Too Beautiful" (Richard Rodgers, Lorenz Hart) - 2:26
10. "How Deep Is the Ocean?" (Irving Berlin) - 4:30
11. "When Your Lover Has Gone" (Einar Aaron Swan) - 2:30

== Personnel ==
- Bud Shank - alto saxophone, flute
- Giulio Libano - trumpet (tracks 1, 2, 4-8 & 10)
- Bob Brookmeyer - valve trombone (tracks 3, 9 & 11)
- Appio Squajella - flute, French horn (tracks 1, 2, 4-8 & 10)
- Glauco Masetti - alto saxophone (tracks 1, 2, 4-8 & 10)
- Eraldo Volonte - tenor saxophone (tracks 1, 2, 4-8 & 10)
- Fausto Papetti - baritone saxophone (tracks 1, 2, 4-8 & 10)
- Claude Williamson - piano (tracks 3, 9 & 11)
- Bruno De Filippi - guitar (tracks 1, 2, 4-8 & 10)
- Don Prell (tracks 1, 2, 4-8 & 10), Joe Mondragon (tracks 3, 9 & 11) - bass
- Larry Bunker (tracks 3, 9 & 11), Jimmy Pratt (tracks 1, 2, 4-8 & 10) - drums (tracks 3, 9 & 11)
- Sam Cytron, Milton Feher, Tibor Zelig - violin (tracks 3, 9 & 11)
- Myron Sandler - viola (tracks 3, 9 & 11)
- Paul Bergstrom - cello (tracks 3, 9 & 11)
- Unidentified harp and strings arranged and conducted by Len Mercer (tracks 1, 2, 4-8 & 10)
