= Behind Brigitte Bardot =

Studio album by Pete Rugolo and His Orchestra
- Released: 1960
- Recorded: December 18 & 30, 1959; Los Angeles
- Genre: Jazz
- Label: Warner Bros. W/WS 1371

Pete Rugolo chronology
The Music from Richard Diamond (1959)	Behind Brigitte Bardot (1960)	10 Trombones Like 2 Pianos (1960)

Behind Brigitte Bardot (subtitled Cool Sounds from Her Hot Scenes) is an album by composer, arranger and conductor Pete Rugolo featuring performances of tunes associated with the films of Brigitte Bardot, and other French films, recorded in late 1959 and first released on the Warner Bros. label.

== Reception ==
Professional ratings
Review scores
Source	Rating
Allmusic	3.5/5 stars

The Allmusic review by Jason Ankeny noted: "the precise raison d'être behind the album is a mystery, but it's nevertheless a charmer, boasting some of Pete Rugolo's lushest and loveliest arrangements ... wry, cool-toned jazz melodies heavy on innuendo and late-night appeal. Whatever the notion behind the session, the execution's delightful".

== Track listing ==
1. "Jeff's Blues" (Jeff Davis) – 2:52
2. "Mambo Bardot" (Paul Misraki) – 4:03
3. "Tell Me Something Sweet" (Misraki, André Hornez, Judy Spencer) – 2:39
4. "Arsenic-Blues" (Marc Lanjean) – 3:16
5. "Paris B.B." (André Hodeir) – 2:17
6. "Manina Theme" (Jean Yatove) – 3:34
7. "A T'Aimer" (René Cloërec, Henri Contet) – 2:12
8. "L' Etang" (Misraki) – 2:52
9. "Ma Vie Est a Toi" (Bill Byers) – 3:03
10. "The Night Heaven Fell" (Burt Bacharach, Hal David) – 2:39
- Recorded in Los Angeles, CA on December 18, 1959 (tracks 1, 2, 4, 5 & 9) and December 30, 1959 (tracks 3, 6–8 & 10).

=== Related films ===
1. from L'Homme et l'Enfant (1956)
2. from And God Created Woman (1956)
3. from And God Created Woman (1956)
4. from La Peau de l'ours (1957)
5. from Une Parisienne (1957)
6. from The Girl in the Bikini (1952)
7. from Love Is My Profession (1958)
8. from Sans Famille (1958)
9. from Le Grand Bluff (1957)
10. from The Night Heaven Fell (1958)

== Personnel ==
- Pete Rugolo – arranger, conductor
- Pete Candoli, Ollie Mitchell, Jack Sheldon – trumpet
- Milt Bernhart, Frank Rosolino – trombone
- Ken Shroyer – bass trombone
- Vincent DeRosa, Richard Perissi – French horn
- Buddy Collette, Chuck Gentry, Paul Horn, Ted Nash, Bud Shank – reeds
- Larry Bunker (tracks 1, 2, 4, 5 & 9), Gene Estes (tracks 3, 6–8 & 10) – vibraphone, percussion
- Fred Katz – piano, cello
- Laurindo Almeida – guitar
- Phil Stephens – bass, tuba
- Buddy Clark (tracks 1, 2, 4, 5 & 9), Joe Mondragon (tracks 3, 6–8 & 10) – bass
- Mel Lewis – drums
- Gloria Wood – vocals
