= Milt Bernhart =

American jazz trombonist (1926–2004)

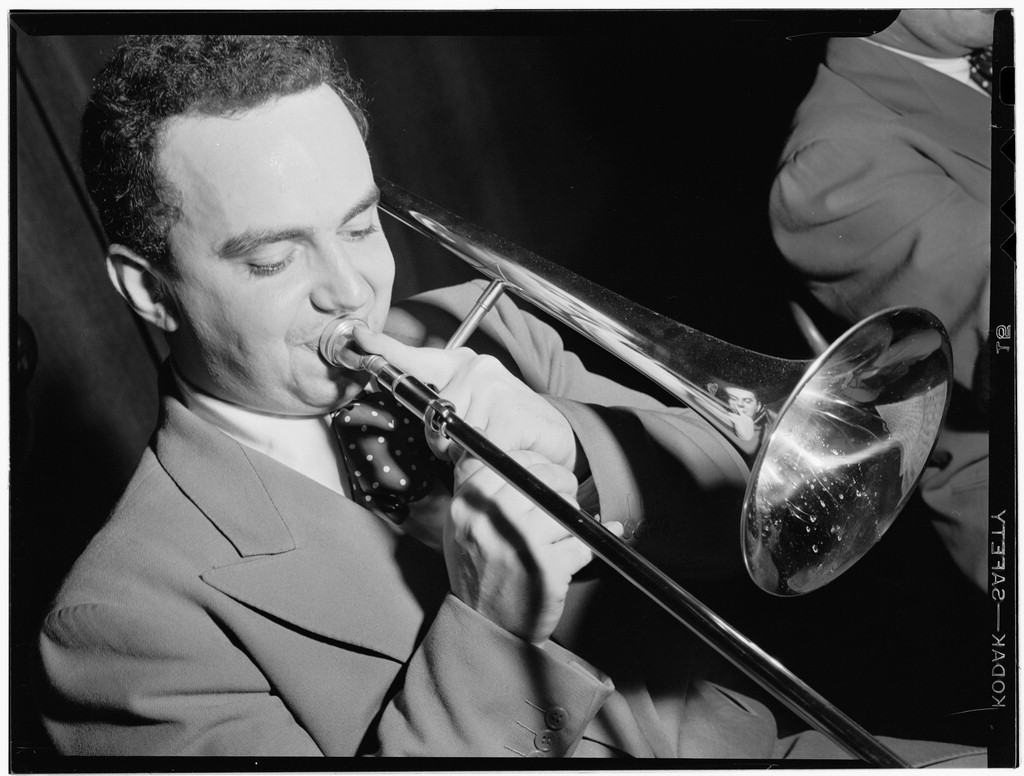

Background information
- Born: May 25, 1926; Valparaiso, Indiana, U.S.
- Died: January 22, 2004 (aged 77) Glendale, California, U.S.
- Genres: Jazz
- Occupation: Musician
- Instrument: Trombone

Milt Bernhart (May 25, 1926 – January 22, 2004) was a West Coast jazz trombonist who worked with Stan Kenton, Frank Sinatra, and others. He supplied the solo in the middle of Sinatra's 1956 recording of I've Got You Under My Skin conducted by Nelson Riddle.

== Biography ==
Bernhart (occasionally spelled Bernhardt) began on tuba, but switched to trombone in high school. At 16 he worked in Boyd Raeburn's band and later had some "gigs" with Teddy Powell. After time in the United States Army he worked, off and on, with Stan Kenton for the next ten years. He is perhaps most associated with Kenton, but in 1955 he had his first album as a leader. In 1986 he was elected President of the Big Band Academy of America.

Although known as "mild-mannered" or humorous, his brief period with Benny Goodman was one area that brought out his ire. He indicated working with Goodman was "the bottom", except for basic training in the Army, of his first 23 years of life. He called Goodman a "bore" and claimed he did nothing about the treatment Wardell Gray faced at a segregated club in Las Vegas. He even alleges that he quit because Goodman publicly humiliated Gray in front of an audience.

Bernhart died of congestive heart failure in Glendale, California at the age of 77 at Adventist Health Glendale.

== Discography ==
=== As leader ===
- Modern Brass (RCA Victor, 1955)
- The Sound of Bernhart (Decca, 1958)

=== As sideman ===
With Maynard Ferguson

- Jam Session featuring Maynard Ferguson (EmArcy, 1955)
- Maynard Ferguson Octet (EmArcy, 1955)
- Dimensions (EmArcy, 1956)
- Around the Horn with Maynard Ferguson (Emarcy, 1956)
- Stratospheric (Mercury, 1976)

With Stan Kenton

- Encores (Capitol, 1947)
- A Presentation of Progressive Jazz (Capitol, 1947)
- Innovations in Modern Music (Capitol, 1950)
- Stan Kenton's Milestones (Capitol, 1950)
- Stan Kenton Classics (Capitol, 1952)
- Popular Favorites by Stan Kenton (Capitol, 1953)
- Stan Kenton Presents (Capitol, 1955)
- The Kenton Era (Capitol, 1955)
- Kenton in Hi-Fi (Capitol, 1956)
- Lush Interlude (Capitol, 1959)
- Artistry in Voices and Brass (Capitol, 1963)
- The Innovations Orchestra (Capitol, 1997)

With Henri Rene

- RCA Victor Presents Eartha Kitt (RCA, 1953)
- That Bad Eartha (EP) (RCA, 1954)
- Down to Eartha (RCA, 1955)
- That Bad Eartha (LP) (RCA, 1956)
- Thursday's Child (RCA, 1957)

With Shorty Rogers

- Shorty Rogers and His Giants (RCA Victor, 1953)
- Collaboration (RCA Victor, 1955)
- The Big Shorty Rogers Express (RCA Victor, 1956)
- Shorty Rogers Plays Richard Rodgers (RCA Victor, 1957)
- Jazz Waltz (Reprise, 1962)

With Pete Rugolo

- Introducing Pete Rugolo (Columbia, 1954)
- Adventures in Rhythm (Columbia, 1954)
- Rugolomania (Columbia, 1955)
- New Sounds by Pete Rugolo (Harmony, 1957)
- Music for Hi-Fi Bugs (EmArcy, 1956)
- Out on a Limb (EmArcy, 1957)
- An Adventure in Sound: Brass in Hi-Fi (Mercury, 1957)
- Percussion at Work (EmArcy, 1958)
- Rugolo Plays Kenton (EmArcy, 1958)
- The Music from Richard Diamond (EmArcy, 1959)
- Behind Brigitte Bardot (Warner Bros., 1960)
- 10 Trombones Like 2 Pianos (Mercury, 1960)
- The Original Music of Thriller (Mercury, 1961)

With Howard Rumsey

- Sunday Jazz a La Lighthouse Vol. 1 (Contemporary, 1953)
- Sunday Jazz a La Lighthouse Vol. 2 (Contemporary, 1953)
- Jazz Rolls Royce (Lighthouse, 1958)

With Lalo Schifrin

- The Cincinnati Kid (MGM, 1965)
- More Mission: Impossible (Paramount, 1968)
- Mannix (Paramount, 1968)
- Bullitt (Warner Bros., 1968)
- Rock Requiem (Verve, 1971)

With others

- Van Alexander, The Home of Happy Feet (Capitol, 1959)
- Chet Baker and Bud Shank, Theme Music from "The James Dean Story" (World Pacific, 1957)
- Elmer Bernstein, The Man with the Golden Arm (Decca, 1956)
- Harry Betts, The Jazz Soul of Doctor Kildare (Choreo, 1962)
- Buddy Bregman, Swinging Kicks (Verve, 1957)
- Les Brown, Les Brown's in Town (Decca, 1965)
- Frank Capp, Percussion in a Tribute to Glenn Miller (Kimberly, 1963)
- June Christy, June Christy Recalls Those Kenton Days (Capitol, 1959)
- Rosemary Clooney, Clap Hands! Here Comes Rosie! (RCA Victor, 1960)
- Pete Candoli, Blues, When Your Lover Has Gone (Somerset/Stereo-Fidelity, 1961)
- Bing Crosby, Bing Sings Whilst Bregman Swings (Verve, 1956)
- Bobby Darin, From Hello Dolly to Goodbye Charlie (Capitol, 1964)
- Bobby Darin, Venice Blue (Capitol, 1965)
- Sammy Davis Jr., It's All Over but the Swingin' (Decca, 1957)
- Buddy DeFranco, Cross Country Suite (Dot, 1958)
- Dean Elliott, College Confidential (Chancellor, 1960)
- The Four Freshmen, Four Freshmen and 5 Trombones (Capitol, 1955)
- Gilbert & Sullivan, The Coolest Mikado (Andex, 1961)
- Astrud Gilberto, The Astrud Gilberto Album (Verve, 1965)
- Astrud Gilberto, Astrud Gilberto (Verve, 1987)
- Glen Gray, Solo Spotlight (Capitol, 1960)
- Glen Gray, Please, Mr. Gray... (Capitol, 1961)
- Carolyn Hester, Carolyn Hester (RCA, 1973)
- Al Hirt, Horn a-Plenty (RCA Victor, 1962)
- Jonah Jones/Glen Gray, Jonah Jones Quartet/Glen Gray Casa Loma Orchestra (Capitol, 1962)
- Bob Keene, Bob Keene & His Orchestra (GNP, 1954)
- Bob Keene, Solo for Seven (Andex, 1958)
- Carol Lawrence, This Heart of Mine (Choreo, 1962)
- Peggy Lee, In the Name of Love (Capitol, 1964)
- Nellie Lutcher with Russell Garcia, Our New Nellie (Liberty, 1956)
- Junior Mance, Get Ready, Set, Jump!!! (Capitol, 1964)
- Junior Mance, Straight Ahead! (Capitol, 1965)
- Henry Mancini The Music from Peter Gunn (RCA Victor, 1959)
- Johnny Mandel, I Want to Live (United Artists, 1958)
- Skip Martin, 8 Brass, 5 Sax, 4 Rhythm (MGM, 1959)
- Skip Martin, Scheherajazz (Pye, 1959)
- Billy May, Bill's Bag (Capitol, 1963)
- Billy May, Today! (Capitol, 1966)
- Lyle Murphy, New Orbits in Sound (GNP, 1958)
- Vido Musso, The Swingin'st (Modern, 1956)
- Anita O'Day, Anita (Verve, 1956)
- Ruth Olay, Olay! The New Sound of Ruth Olay (Mercury, 1959)
- Perez Prado, Havana, 3 A.M. (RCA/BMG 1990)
- Frankie Randall, Sings & Swings (RCA Victor, 1965)
- Buddy Rich, The Swinging Buddy Rich (Norgran, 1954)
- Johnny Richards, Something Else by Johnny Richards (Bethlehem, 1956)
- Tony Scott/Milt Bernhart, Untitled (RCA Victor, 1985)
- Tak Shindo, Brass and Bamboo (Capitol, 1960)
- Frank Sinatra, Forever Frank (Capitol, 1966)
- The Three Sounds, Three Moods (Limelight, 1965)
- Bobby Troup, Bobby Troup and His Stars of Jazz (RCA Victor, 1959)
- Walter Wanderley, The Return of the Original (Ancora, 1972)
- Stanley Wilson, The Music from M Squad (RCA Victor, 1959)
