= Howard Rumsey =

American jazz double-bassist

- Born: November 7, 1917; Brawley, California, U.S.
- Died: July 15, 2015 (aged 97) Newport Beach, California, U.S.
- Genres: Jazz
- Occupation: Musician
- Instrument: Double bass
- Label: Contemporary
- Formerly of: Lighthouse All-Stars

Howard Rumsey (November 7, 1917 – July 15, 2015) was an American jazz double-bassist known for his leadership of the Lighthouse All-Stars in the 1950s.

== Biography ==
Born in Brawley, California, United States, Rumsey first began playing the piano, followed by the drums and finally the bass. After jobs with Vido Musso and Johnnie Davis, Rumsey became part of Stan Kenton's first band. Rumsey soon left Kenton after an argument. He played with Charlie Barnet and Barney Bigard before taking a short hiatus from music. Following this absence, Rumsey returned to the Los Angeles jazz scene to form the group the Lighthouse All-Stars. For most of the 1950s this group played each Sunday at the Lighthouse Cafe in Hermosa Beach. During its lifetime, the Lighthouse All-Stars were one of the primary modern jazz institutions on the west coast, providing a home for many Los Angeles musicians.

== The Lighthouse All-Stars ==
In early 1949, Rumsey was in search of a playing job and came across the Lighthouse Club on Pier Avenue in Hermosa Beach, which he felt would be an ideal place to play music. The Lighthouse was built in 1934 as a restaurant named Verpilates. In 1940, the business changed hands, and under new ownership it was turned into a Polynesian-styled club named the Lighthouse, primarily serving merchant seamen. In 1948, the club was sold to John Levine. After convincing Levine to permit the playing of jazz in the club, Rumsey played his first show on Sunday 29 May 1949, to immediate success.

The first Lighthouse All-Stars was a group made up of Los Angeles musicians who had been a part of the Central Avenue scene in the 1940s, including Teddy Edwards, Sonny Criss, Hampton Hawes, Frank Patchen, Bobby White, and Keith Williams. This band lasted for a time before Rumsey changed personnel to feature a new wave of players. The second edition of the Lighthouse All-Stars featured Jimmy Giuffre, Shorty Rogers, and Shelly Manne. The success of this group soon landed them with a recording contract for Les Koenig's Contemporary Records. Not only were the Lighthouse All-Stars recording for Contemporary, but many of the members of the group were also leading sessions for this same label.

After Rogers, Giuffre and Manne left together in 1953 for a job at The Haig, Rumsey had to recreate his band yet again. This third edition featured Bud Shank, Bob Cooper, Rolf Ericson, and Max Roach. This band took part in a historic recording on 13 September 1953, Roach's first show with the group, which would feature both Chet Baker and Miles Davis, along with Russ Freeman and Lorraine Geller.

With the eventual breakup of this edition, the chairs were filled by various other notable musicians throughout the following years. In his book West Coast Jazz, author Ted Gioia claims to have listed over seventy-five musicians who were once members of the group. By the early 1960s interest in jazz in Los Angeles had greatly faded and the group came to its demise. From 1971 to 1985, Rumsey owned and operated Concerts By The Sea in Redondo Beach, California, a "distinctive club that provided an ideal tiered, concert-seating venue (seating 200) which offered the finest jazz in the Los Angeles area".

Rumsey died from complications of pneumonia in Newport Beach, California, at the age of 97.

== Discography ==
=== As leader (credited to Howard Rumsey's Lighthouse All Stars) ===
78rpm singles:

- "You Know I'm In Love With You" // "Desire" (Skylark SK537) [note: both songs feature Vivien Garry on vocals]
- "Big Boy (Part I)" // "Big Boy (Part II)" (Skylark SK538) [note: these four tracks are from the first Lighthouse All Stars recording session in 1952]
- "Big Boy - Part 1" // "Big Boy - Part 2" (Modern 875) [note: these two tracks are from a live concert performance by the LHAS during the summer of 1952; disc released under the name of Jim Giuffre & His Orchestra]
- "Out Of Somewhere" // "Viva Zapata!" (Lighthouse LH351)
- "Swing Shift" // "Big Girl" (Lighthouse LH352) [note: these 4 tracks are from the second LHAS recording session (1953); both LH351 and LH352 were later included on C2506]

10" LPs:

- Volume 2 - Sunday Jazz A La Lighthouse (Contemporary C2501) -CD issue: OJC/Fantasy 972-
- Volume 3 (Contemporary C2506) [note: UK version of C2506 is titled Howard Rumsey & His Lighthouse All Stars, Vol. 3]
- Volume 4 - Oboe/Flute (Contemporary C2510) [note: UK version of C2510 is titled Howard Rumsey & His Lighthouse All Stars, Vol. 1 - Bob Cooper, oboe & English horn; Bud Shank, flute & alto flute; Howard Rumsey, bass; Claude Williamson, piano; Max Roach, drums]
- Volume 5 - In The Solo Spotlight (Contemporary C2515) [note: UK version of C2515 is titled Howard Rumsey & His Lighthouse All Stars, Vol. 2 - In The Solo Spotlight]

12" LPs:

- Jazz Rolls Royce (Lighthouse CS-300).
- Volume 1 - Sunday Jazz A La Lighthouse (Lighthouse LP301 [original issue]; Contemporary C3501 [reissue]) -CD issue: OJC/Fantasy 151-
- Volume 6 (Contemporary C3504) -CD issue: OJC/Fantasy 386-
- Volume 3 (Contemporary C3508) [note: this is a reissue of C2506 with three tracks from 1955 added on] -CD issue: OJC/Fantasy 266-
- Lighthouse At Laguna (Contemporary C3509) [note: this is the seventh volume in the 'Lighthouse Series' on Contemporary) -CD issue: OJC/Fantasy 406-
- Volume 5 - In The Solo Spotlight! (Contemporary C3517) [note: this is a reissue of C2515 with three tracks from 1957 added on] -CD issue: OJC/Fantasy 451-
- Volume 4 - Oboe/Flute (Contemporary C3520) [note: this is a reissue of C2510 with four tracks from 1956 added on] -CD issue: OJC/Fantasy 154-
- Music For Lighthousekeeping (Contemporary C3528) [note: this is the eighth volume in the 'Lighthouse Series' on Contemporary) -CD issue: OJC/Fantasy 636-

=== As sideman ===
With Chet Baker

- Witch Doctor (Contemporary C7649, rec. 1953; rel. 1985) -CD issue: OJC/Fantasy 609-

With Miles Davis

- At Last! (Contemporary C7645, rec. 1953; rel. 1985) -CD issue: OJC/Fantasy 480-

With Stan Kenton

- The Kenton Era (Capitol WDX-569, rec. 1940-1954; rel. 1955)

With Art Pepper and Shorty Rogers

- Popo (Xanadu 148, rec. 1951; rel. 1978) -CD issue: Xanadu 1223; later reissued on Definitive/The Jazz Factory FCD 22836 (with two bonus tracks) and re-titled as Complete Lighthouse Sessions-

With Art Pepper

- Early Days, Vol. 1 (Norma/Vantage NLP-5001, rec. 1952; rel. 1991) -CD issue: Norma/Vantage NOCD 5630 (with five bonus tracks) and re-titled as Live At The Lighthouse '52-

With Stan Getz

- The Lighthouse Sessions, Vol. 1 (Norma/Vantage NLP-5003, rec. 1953; rel. 1991) -CD issue: Giant Steps GSCR 022 and re-titled as Stan Getz And The Lighthouse All-Stars Live-

== Filmography ==
- Jazz on the West Coast: The Lighthouse (RoseKing Productions, Kenneth Koenig, 2005) -DVD-
