= Something Cool =

Studio album by June Christy
- Released: August 2, 1954 Capitol H516; August 1, 1955 Capitol T516; October 15, 1960 Capitol ST516
- Recorded: 1953, 1954, 1955, 1960
- Genre: Vocal jazz
- Label: Capitol
- Producer: Lee Gillette

June Christy chronology
Something Cool (1954)	Duet (1955)

Stereo issue cover art

Professional ratings
Review scores
Source	Rating
Allmusic	5/5 stars
Penguin Guide to Jazz	👑

Something Cool is the debut solo album by June Christy, released on Capitol Records first as a 10-inch LP of seven selections in August of 1954, and then as a 12-inch LP of eleven selections the following August, both times in monophonic sound. The original seven selections for the 1954 release were recorded over seven sessions from August 1953 through March 1954, with the additional four for the 1955 issue from four additional sessions in December 1954 as well as May and June of 1955, with arrangements for all sessions written and conducted by Pete Rugolo. Her saxophonist husband, Bob Cooper, also played on many of these sessions. In April 1960, Christy and Rugolo re-recorded all 11 selections in stereophonic sound, so that a stereo version of Something Cool could be issued. For many years, this re-recorded version of the album was the only one commercially available.

== Background and reception ==
Christy had been associated with "cool" jazz since her vocal work with the Stan Kenton Orchestra in the 1940s and early 1950s. Hired by Kenton to replace departed singer Anita O'Day, Christy's tenure with Kenton included sessions for his Innovations Orchestra in 1950 and 1951. Arranger Rugolo worked for the Kenton big band in the late 1940s during Christy's tenure, and in addition to husband Cooper many of the players on sessions for this album were Kenton alumni — Milt Bernhart, Conte Candoli, Maynard Ferguson, John Graas, Skeets Herfurt, Shelly Manne, George Roberts, Shorty Rogers, Frank Rosolino, and Bud Shank. As well as launching her career as a solo artist, according to jazz writer John Bush Something Cool was responsible for launching the cool movement in jazz singing.

The original ten-inch mono album peaked at #8 on the Billboard Best-Selling Popular Albums chart published January 8, 1955, the precursor to the Billboard 200. It has been awarded a rare "crown" accolade by The Penguin Guide to Jazz Recordings. Will Friedwald placed the album on his desert island discs list in the 1996 republication of Jazz Singing, stating in his 2010 tome A Biographical Guide to the Great Jazz and Pop Singers that:

"...it's closer to being a perfect album, in every respect, than most of the albums made by superior jazz singers, like O'Day and Fitzgerald."

== Release history ==
Something Cool was released first as a ten-inch LP in 1954, and then upgraded to a twelve-inch LP in 1955 with four additional tracks for the expanding albums market. Notably, the 1955 edition was re-recorded for stereo by Christy and Rugolo, with variations in session musicians, in its entirety over three days, April 26–28, 1960, and released again under the same title in 1960. The 1960 stereo version had the same track listing in the same order as the 1955 mono version, but with a variant on the original cover art.

A compact disc reissue appeared in 1991 comprising the eleven tracks of the original 12-inch 1955 LP with an additional 13 tracks, all mono recordings from August 14, 1953, through July 28, 1955, with arrangements by Rugolo. Controversially, the songs were sequenced in the order they were recorded, meaning that this package did not duplicate the original running sequence of the album. Ten of the bonus tracks for this release had appeared as both sides of five singles; one track, "Until the Real Thing Comes Along," first appeared on the 1958 compilation This Is June Christy, while the two remaining tracks were first issued on this 1991 compact disc. Although the 24 tracks on this reissue are all mono recordings, the cover art for the stereo edition was used. No information is given as to what, if any, remastering techniques were used for analog to digital conversion.

In 2001 a further compact disc reissue appeared, 22 tracks with the entirety of both the 1955 mono and the 1960 stereo LPs in correct original running order. For this issue, recordings were remastered using 24-bit Super Bit Mapping, and the 1960 stereo recordings were remixed from the original three-track tapes. This edition garnered the crown status by the Penguin Guide to Jazz Recordings.

== Track listing ==
The original ten-inch LP comprised the first three songs on side one below, and the first four songs of side two below. Those running orders were duplicated with two tracks added to each side for the twelve-inch LP, as below. The 1960 twelve-inch stereo LP duplicated the running order of the 1955 mono twelve-inch LP, and the 2001 compact disc repeats the order in stereo after the mono.

=== Side one ===
No.	Title	Writer(s)	Length
1.	"Something Cool"	Billy Barnes	4:20
2.	"It Could Happen to You"	Jimmy Van Heusen, Johnny Burke	1:58
3.	"Lonely House"	Kurt Weill, Langston Hughes	3:59
4.	"This Time the Dream's on Me"	Harold Arlen, Johnny Mercer	1:32
5.	"The Night We Called It a Day"	Matt Dennis, Tom Adair	4:48

=== Side two ===
No.	Title	Writer(s)	Length
1.	"Midnight Sun"	Lionel Hampton, Sonny Burke, Johnny Mercer	3:16
2.	"I'll Take Romance"	Ben Oakland, Oscar Hammerstein II	2:21
3.	"A Stranger Called the Blues"	Mel Tormé, Robert Wells	3:59
4.	"I Should Care"	Paul Weston, Sammy Cahn, Axel Stordahl	2:11
5.	"Softly, as in a Morning Sunrise"	Sigmund Romberg, Oscar Hammerstein II	2:21
6.	"I'm Thrilled"	Sidney Lippman, Sylvia Dee	2:43

=== 1991 compact disc reissue ===
No.	Title	Writer(s)	Original issue	Length
1.	"Not I"	Sammy Gallop, Dick Manning	Capitol F2590
2.	"Whee Baby"	Peggy Lee, Alice Larson	Capitol F2590b
3.	"Why Do You Have to Go Home"	Larry Gilbert, Lee Tompkins	Capitol F2664b
4.	"You're Making Me Crazy"	Roy Alfred, Bill Darlel	Capitol F2664
5.	"Something Cool"	Billy Barnes	Something Cool Capitol H516
6.	"Magazines"	Dick Rogers, Jimmy Eaton, Larry Wagner	Capitol F2765b
7.	"Midnight Sun"	Lionel Hampton, Sonny Burke, Johnny Mercer	Something Cool Capitol H516
8.	"Lonely House"	Kurt Weill, Langston Hughes	Something Cool Capitol H516
9.	"I Should Care"	Paul Weston, Sammy Cahn, Axel Stordahl	Something Cool Capitol H516
10.	"It Could Happen to You"	Jimmy Van Heusen, Johnny Burke	Something Cool Capitol H516
11.	"The First Thing You Know, You're in Love"	Mel Tormé, Robert Wells	Capitol F2765
12.	"A Stranger Called the Blues"	Mel Tormé	Something Cool Capitol H516
13.	"I'll Take Romance"	Ben Oakland, Oscar Hammerstein II	Something Cool Capitol H516
14.	"Look Out Up There"	Milt Raskin, Pete Rugolo	Capitol F3375b
15.	"Softly, as in a Morning Sunrise"	Sigmund Romberg, Oscar Hammerstein II	Something Cool Capitol T516
16.	"Out of Somewhere"	Jimmy Giuffre	previously unreleased
17.	"Love Doesn't Live Here Anymore"	Frederick Martin Lehman	previously unreleased
18.	"I'm Thrilled"	Sidney Lippman, Sylvia Dee	Something Cool Capitol T516
19.	"This Time the Dream's on Me"	Harold Arlen, Johnny Mercer	Something Cool Capitol T516
20.	"The Night We Called It a Day"	Matt Dennis, Tom Adair	Something Cool Capitol T516
21.	"Kicks"	Michael Barr, Marvin Fisher	Capitol F3213
22.	"Pete Kelly's Blues"	Ray Heindorf, Sammy Cahn	Capitol F3213b
23.	"Until the Real Thing Comes Along"	Holiner, Nicholas, Chaplin, Cahn, Freedman	This Is June Christy Capitol T1006
24.	"I Never Want to Look into Those Eyes Again"	Milt Raskin, Johnny Mercer	Capitol F3375

== Collective personnel ==
- June Christy — vocals
- Pete Rugolo — arranger, conductor
- Frank Beach, Conte Candoli, Maynard Ferguson, Conrad Gozzo, Ray Linn, Ollie Mitchell, Uan Rasey, Shorty Rogers, Ray Triscari, Jimmy Zito — trumpets
- Harry Betts, Milt Bernhart, Nick Dimaio, Bob Fitzpatrick, Herbie Harper, Tommy Pederson, Dick Reynolds, Frank Rosolino — trombones
- Dick Noel, George Roberts — bass trombones
- Vincent DeRosa, John Graas — French horns
- Paul Sarmento, Phil Stephens — tuba
- Gus Bivona, Harry Klee, Bud Shank — flute, alto flute, alto saxophone
- Bob Cooper, Ted Nash — flute, tenor saxophone
- Skeets Herfurt, Willie Schwartz — alto saxophones
- Fred Falensby, Jimmy Giuffre — tenor saxophones
- Chuck Gentry, Bob Gordon, John Rotella — baritone saxophones
- Buddy Collette, Paul Horn — reeds
- Joe Castro, Geoff Clarkson, Russ Freeman, Paul Smith, Claude Williamson — piano
- Barney Kessel, Jack Marshall, Tony Rizzi, Howard Roberts — guitar
- Harry Babasin, Joe Comfort, Joe Mondragon — bass
- Larry Bunker, Frank Carlson, Shelly Manne, Alvin Stoller — drums

Production personnel

- Lee Gillette — original sessions producer
- Hitoshi Nakemata — 1991 reissue producer
- Michael Cuscuna — 2001 reissue producer
- Ron McMaster — 2001 remixing, mastering
- Will Friedwald — 2001 reissue liner notes
