= Gus Bivona =

American musician (1915–1996)

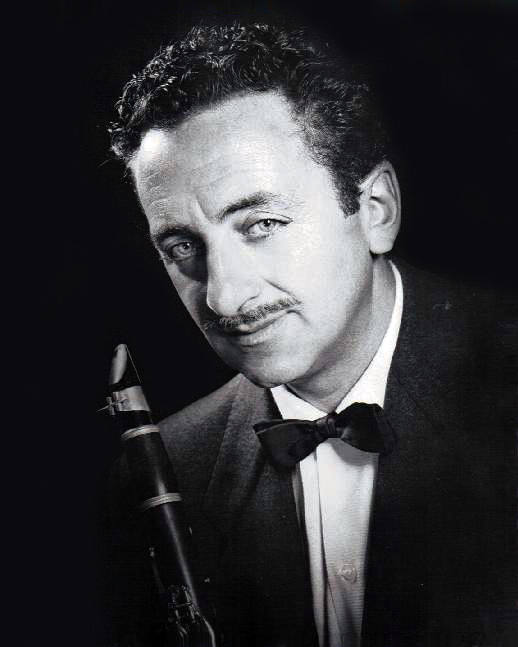

Background information
- Born: Gus Peter Bivona; November 25, 1915; New London, Connecticut, U.S.
- Died: January 5, 1996 (aged 80) Los Angeles, California, U.S.
- Genres: Big band, swing
- Occupation: Musician
- Instrument: Clarinet
- Years active: circa 1935–1995
- Labels: Mercury, Capitol, Warner Bros.

Gus Bivona (November 25, 1915 – January 5, 1996) was an American reed player — covering a range of clarinets, saxophones and flute — at the height of the big band era. Following World War II, he was a staff musician for the MGM Studio Orchestra, playing on countless soundtracks and sessions. He later became a well-known sidekick of pianist, composer, comedian, and television host Steve Allen. In the late 1950s and early 1960s, Bivona began leading his own band, releasing albums under his own name for labels such as Mercury and Warner Bros.

== The 1930s - music upbringing ==
Bivona got his musical start under the close eye of his parents, both of whom were also musicians. His mother was a pianist, and his father was a guitarist. Bivona's first instrument was violin, but he switched to a combination of alto saxophone and clarinet at the age of 16. His professional debut was in a band led by Spider Johnson, followed by dates all around New England in Leo Scalzi's Brunswick Orchestra. In 1935, Bivona began a lengthy stint with the Jimmy Monaco Orchestra, based out of New York City, and also worked with the Hudson-DeLange Orchestra, and spent several months with Bunny Berigan in 1938. Through the end of the 1930s, he also worked with bandleaders such as Will Hudson and Teddy Powell.

== The 1940s and '50s - big bands ==
The first of Bivona's bands under his own name showed up in 1940, but work as a sideman in more established bands seemed to be more what he was after. This included a period with Benny Goodman from the fall of 1940 through the spring of 1941, just in time to match wits with the sizzling electric guitar solos of Charlie Christian. Prior to joining the Naval Air Force Band, Bivona gigged with Jan Savitt and Les Brown & His Band of Renown. A series of high-profile gigs with Tommy Dorsey and Bob Crosby followed the end of the war, and in 1947 Bivona signed on with MGM. Many studio sessions and freelance recordings were the result, carrying on into the 1950s.

Gus Bivona and Steve Allen

== Steve Allen ==
Once he connected with Allen, the two would occasionally hit the concert trail, including a lengthy club residency at the Roundtable in New York City. Music for Swingers: Gus Bivona Plays the Music of Steve Allen is one delightful documentation of this relationship, originally released in 1958 on Mercury. The pair collaborated on many other West Coast jazz recordings, always in the company of many of the top studio players and arrangers, such as Skip Martin, Henry Mancini and Pete Rugolo.

== Family ==
Gus married singer Ruth Robin, sister of Leo Robin. Their son is Gary Bivona who is also a musician who raised a family of musicians as well. Gus is the paternal grandfather of Kevin, Justin and Jesse Bivona of The Interrupters

== Partial discography ==
Artist	Album	Personnel	Dates
Gus Bivona and his Orchestra	Hey! Dig That Crazy Band!		Recorded: February 1956 at Universal Recording Studios, Chicago, IL
Gus Bivona and his Orchestra	Blast Off!		1958
The Great New Gus Bivona Band	Ballads, Bounce, & Bivona	Gus Bivona (Leader, Clarinet); Russell Cheever, Jack DuMont, Morris Crawford, William Ulyate (Saxophones); Frank Beach, Virgil Evans (Trumpets); Joe Howard, Richard Nash, Lloyd Ulyate, George Roberts (Trombones); Bill Miller (Piano); Red Mitchell (Bass); Vince Terri (Guitar); Mel Lewis (Drums)	1959
Gus Bivona and his Orchestra	Bivona Deals In Millions		1960
Steve Allen and Gus Bivona and Hollywood's Greatest Musicians	Swingin' And Dancin' [Equivalent release to Music For Swingers (Mono)]	John Best, Pete Candoli, Conrad Gozzo, Manny Klein (trumpets); Joe Howard, Di Maio, George Roberts, Si Zentner (trombones); Gus Bivona (clarinet, alto sax); Mahlon Clark, Les Robinson (alto sax) Georgie Auld, Don Lodice (tenor sax); Pete Terry (bars); Jimmy Rowles (piano); Vince Terry (guitar); Joe Mondragon or Mike Rubin (bass); Alvin Stoller (drums); Steve Allen (composer); Hank Mancini, Skip Martin (arrangers)	Recorded: March 18–20, 1957, in Hollywood, CA
Steve Allen and Gus Bivona and Hollywoods Greatest Musicians	Music For Swingers [Equivalent release to Swingin' And Dancin' (Stereo)]	John Best, Pete Candoli, Conrad Gozzo, Manny Klein (trumpets); Joe Howard, Di Maio, George Roberts, Si Zentner (trombones); Gus Bivona (clarinet, alto sax); Mahlon Clark, Les Robinson (alto sax) Georgie Auld, Don Lodice (tenor sax); Pete Terry (bars); Jimmy Rowles (piano); Vince Terry (guitar); Joe Mondragon or Mike Rubin (bass); Alvin Stoller (drums); Steve Allen (composer); Hank Mancini, Skip Martin (arrangers)	Recorded: March 18–20, 1957, in Hollywood, CA
Terry Gibbs/Steve Allen/Gus Bivona	Allen's All Stars	Gus Bivona (clarinet); Terry Gibbs (vibes); Steve Allen (piano); George Barnes, Al Viola (guitar); Red Mitchell (bass); Frank DiVito (drums).	Recorded: March 24, 1958, at Joe Pasternak's home, Hollywood, CA
Steve Allen	At The Roundtable	Steve Allen (piano); Gus Bivona (clarinet); Mundell Lowe (guitar); Gary Peacock(bass); Gary Frommer (drums);Terry Gibbs (vibes); Doc Severinson (Trumpet).	1958
Frank Sinatra	Sings For Only The Lonely	Frank Sinatra (Vocals); Nelson Riddle (Arranger); Felix Slatkin (Conductor); Bill Miller (Piano); Gus Bivona (Alto Sax on Track 12: "One For My Baby"	Released: 1958, Recorded: May 25–September 11, 1958, Capitol Studio A, Hollywood
Various Jazz Artists	Session At Midnight	Gus Bivona (Clarinet); Benny Carter (alto sax, trumpet); Irv Cottler (drums); Harry "Sweets" Edison (trumpet); Al Hendrickson (guitar); Plas Johnson (Tenor Sax); Murray McEachern (trombone, alto sax); Jimmy Rowles (piano); Mike Rubin (bass); Babe Russin (tenor sax); Shorty Sherock (trumpet); Willie Smith (alto sax)	December 1955
Skip Martin	Scheherajazz	Gus Bivona, Ted Nash, Paul Horn, Jules Jacobs, Chuck Gentry (reeds); Conrad Gozzo, Pete Candoli, Don Fagerquist, Frank Beach, Joe Triscari (trumpet); Joe Howard, Milt Bernhart, Frank Rosolino, George Roberts (trombone); Vincent DeRosa, Jack Cave, Dick Perissi (French horn); Clarence Karella (tuba); Al Hendrickson (guitar); Jimmy Rowles (piano); Red Mitchell (bass); Larry Bunker, Irv Cottler, Lou Singer (drums); Eudice Shapiro (solo violin); Ed Lustgarten (first cello); and symphony orchestra.	1959
Ralph Marterie And The All Star Men	Big Band Man	Ralph Marterie, Pete Candoli, Conrad Gozzo, Don Fagerquist (trumpet); Frank Rosolino, Vern Friley, Al Hendricks (trombone); Buddy DeFranco, Bud Shank (clarinet, alto sax); Gus Bivona, Bob Cooper (tenor sax); Babe Russin (baritone sax); Jimmy Rowles (piano); Red Mitchell (bass); Jack Sperling (drums); Johnny Mandel, Morty Corb, Skippy Martin, Frank De Vol, Bill Holman (arrangers); Pete Rugolo (recording director).	Recorded: August 1959 at United Recording Studios, Los Angeles, CA.
Benny Goodman	The Best of Benny Goodman: The Capitol Years	Benny Goodman (clarinet); Heinie Beau, Gus Bivona, Hymie Schertzer, Jules Rubin, Benny Carter (alto saxophone); Stan Getz, Herbie Haymer, Bumps Myers, Art Rollini, Don Byas, Wardell Gray, Dave Cavanaugh (tenor saxophone); Billy Butterfield, Charlie Shavers, Fats Navarro, Mickey McMickle, John Best, George Seaburg, Frank Beach, Harry James, Ruby Braff, Irving Goodman (trumpet); Vernon Brown, Jack Satterfield (trombone); Red Norvo (vibraphone, xylophone); Lionel Hampton (vibraphone); Mel Powell, Teddy Wilson, Jess Stacy, Tommy Todd, Jimmy Rowles (piano); Allan Reuss, Irving Ashby (guitar); Sid Weiss, Harry Babasin, Red Callender (bass); Cozy Cole, Tommy Romersa, Lee Young (drums).	Recorded: June 12, 1944 – February 25, 1964.
Pete Rugolo and his Orchestra	10 Saxophones and 2 Basses	Russ Cheever (soprano sax, C melody sax); Skeets Herfurt, Bud Shank, Gus Bivona (alto sax); Bob Cooper, Plas Johnson, Gene Cipriano (tenor sax); Bill Perkins (tenor sax, bass sax); Chuck Gentry, Bill Hood (baritone sax, bass sax); Jimmy Rowles (piano); Howard Roberts (guitar, banjo); Red Mitchell, Joe Mondragon (bass); Shelly Manne (drums); Pete Rugolo (arranger, conductor).	Recorded: November 8–9, 1961, at United Recording Studios, Hollywood, CA.

== Pictures ==
Pictures of Gus Bivona

Gus Bivona

In a recording session.

Gus Bivona

The Will Hudson Orchestra

Promotional Picture

Gus Bivona

Promotional Picture

In a recording session.

The Bob Crosby Orchestra @ Paramount Theatre circa 1947

Gus Bivona

MGM's anniversary celebration of 1953
