= Al Hendrickson =

American jazz guitarist

- Born: Alton Reynolds Hendrickson; May 10, 1920; Eastland, Texas, U.S.
- Died: July 19, 2007 (aged 87) North Bend, Oregon, U.S.
- Genre: Jazz
- Occupation: Musician
- Instrument: Guitar

Alton Reynolds Hendrickson (May 10, 1920 – July 19, 2007) was an American jazz guitarist and occasional vocalist.

== Biography ==
When he was five years old, Hendrickson's family moved to California, where he grew up. He played early in his career with the Gramercy Five, Ray Linn, Artie Shaw, and Freddie Slack, then worked with Benny Goodman in both smaller and larger ensemble settings. He played with Woody Herman on several occasions in the late 1940s through the end of the 1950s, and also played with Neal Hefti, Bill Holman, Barney Kessel, Johnny Mandel, Billy May, Ray Noble, Andre Previn, Louis Prima, Boyd Raeburn, Shorty Rogers, and Bud Shank. In 1962, he appeared at the Monterey Jazz Festival alongside Louie Bellson and Dizzy Gillespie.

He also worked as an accompanist and session musician for many popular vocalists, such as Rosemary Clooney, Bing Crosby, Doris Day, Lee Hazlewood, Eartha Kitt, Frankie Laine, Ann-Margret, Dean Martin, Ella Mae Morse, Harry Nilsson, and Elvis Presley (Viva Las Vegas). He also worked with arrangers like Quincy Jones, Henry Mancini, Nelson Riddle, and Lalo Schifrin, and did sessions for television and film.

Hendrickson died of a heart attack at his home in North Bend, Oregon, at the age of 87.

== Discography ==
=== As sideman ===
With The Andrews Sisters

- Fresh and Frency Free (Capitol, 1957)

With Ray Conniff

- Friendly Persuasion (Columbia, 1964)
- Speak to Me of Love (CBS, 1964)
- You Make Me Feel So Young (Columbia, 1964)

With Earl Grant

- The End (Decca, 1958)
- Beyond the Reef and Other Instrumental Favorites (Decca, 1962)
- Winter Wonderland (Decca, 1972)

With Billy Eckstine

- The Modern Sound of Mr. B (Mercury, 1964)

With Dean Martin

- This Time I'm Swingin'! (Capitol, 1960)
- Dino: Italian Love Songs (Capitol, 1962)
- Cha Cha de Amor (Capitol, 1962)

With Frank Sinatra

- Come Fly with Me (Capitol, 1958)
- Come Dance with Me! (Capitol, 1959)
- All Alone (Reprise, 1962)
- September of My Years (Reprise, 1965)
- The World We Knew (Reprise, 1967)

With others

- Laurindo Almeida, Guitar from Ipanema (Capitol, 1964)
- Georgie Auld, In the Land of Hi-Fi (Mercury, 1956)
- Jesse Belvin, Mr. Easy (RCA, 1960)
- Johnny Best, Dixieland Left and Right (Mercury, 1961)
- Harry Betts, The Jazz Soul of Doctor Kildare (Choreo, 1962)
- Pat Boone, Great! Great! Great! (Dot, 1961)
- Pete Candoli, Blues When Your Lover Has Gone (Somerset, 1961)
- Frank Capp & Nat Pierce, Juggernaut (Concord Jazz, 1977)
- Benny Carter, Session at Midnight (EMI, 1972)
- Herman Clebanoff, Exciting Sounds (Mercury, 1961)
- Herman Clebanoff, Lush, Latin & Bossa Nova Too! (Mercury, 1963)
- Rosemary Clooney, Rosie Solves the Swingin' Riddle! (RCA Victor, 1961)
- Rosemary Clooney, Love (Reprise, 1963)
- Nat King Cole, Nat King Cole Sings/George Shearing Plays (Capitol, 1962)
- Peggy Connelly, Peggy Connelly (Bethlehem, 1956)
- Scatman Crothers, Rock 'N' Roll with Scat Man (Tops, 1956)
- Maxwell Davis, Compositions of Duke Ellington and Others (Crown, 1960)
- Bobby Darin, Love Swings (Atco, 1961)
- Percy Faith, Black Magic Woman (Columbia, 1971)
- Percy Faith, Bouquet of Love (Columbia, 1962)
- Frances Faye, I'm Wild Again (Bethlehem, 1955)
- Frances Faye, Swinging All the Way with Frances Faye (Verve, 1962)
- Victor Feldman, The Venezuela Joropo (Pacific Jazz, 1967)
- The Four Freshmen, The Four Freshmen and Five Guitars (Capitol, 1959)
- Ted Gärdestad, Blue Virgin Isles (Polar, 1978)
- Dizzy Gillespie, The New Continent (Limelight, 1965)
- Conrad Gozzo, Goz the Great! (RCA Victor, 1955)
- Lorne Greene, Lorne Greene's American West (RCA Victor, 1965)
- Richard Greene, Ramblin (Rounder, 1979)
- Guitars Unlimited, Quiet Nights and Brazilian Guitars (Capitol, 1966)
- Guitars Unlimited, Tender Is the Night (Capitol, 1969)
- Al Hirt, Horn a-Plenty (RCA Victor, 1962)
- Al Hirt & Ann-Margret, Beauty and the Beard (RCA Victor, 1964)
- Diana Hubbard, LifeTimes (Waterhouse, 1979)
- Gordon Jenkins, France 70 (Time, 1962)
- Beverly Mahr, Gordon Jenkins Presents My Wife The Blues Singer (Impulse, 1963)
- Gordon Jenkins, Paris I Wish You Love (Time, 1964)
- Barney Kessel, To Swing or Not to Swing (Contemporary, 1955)
- Barney Kessel, Contemporary Latin Rhythms (Reprise, 1963)
- Eartha Kitt, St Louis Blues (RCA Victor, 1958)
- Peggy Lee, Jump for Joy (Capitol, 1958)
- Peggy Lee, Pretty Eyes (Capitol, 1960)
- Peggy Lee, If You Go (Capitol, 1961)
- Peggy Lee, I'm a Woman (Capitol, 1963)
- Peggy Lee, Mink Jazz (Capitol, 1963)
- Peggy Lee, Guitars a là Lee (Capitol, 1966)
- Skip Martin, Scheherajazz (Golden Guinea, 1959)
- Skip Martin, Perspectives in Percussion (Somerset, 1961)
- Matty Matlock, Dixieland (Mayfair, 1957)
- Billy May, Billy May's Big Fat Brass (Capitol, 1958)
- Billy May, Sorta-May (Creative World, 1971)
- Lincoln Mayorga, Lincoln Mayorga & Distinguished Colleagues (Sheffield Lab, 1971)
- Eddie Miller, Frat Hop (Tops, 1957)
- The Monkees, The Birds, the Bees & the Monkees (Rhino, 1968)
- Mark Murphy, Playing the Field (Capitol, 1960)
- Ruth Olay, Soul in the Night (ABC, 1966)
- Dave Pell, Dave Pell's Prez Conference (GNP Crescendo, 1978)
- Dave Pell, In Celebration of Lester Young (GNP Crescendo, 1979)
- Andre Previn, Andre Previn Plays Gershwin (RCA Victor, 1955)
- Andre Previn, Let's Get Away from It All (Decca, 1955)
- Googie Rene, Romesville! (Class, 1959)
- Howard Roberts, Guilty!! (Capitol, 1967)
- Shorty Rogers & Andre Previn, Collaboration (RCA Victor, 1955)
- Lalo Schifrin, Che! (Tetragrammaton, 1969)
- Paul Smith, Latin Keyboard & Percussion (Verve, 1960)
- Joanie Sommers & Laurindo Almeida, Softly, the Brazilian Sound (Warner Bros., 1964)
- Jack Teagarden, Swing Low Sweet Spiritual (Capitol, 1957)
- Mel Tormé, I Dig the Duke! I Dig the Count! (Verve, 1962)
- Mel Tormé, Mel Tormé Sings Sunday in New York & Other Songs About New York (Atlantic, 1963)
- Joe Williams, Prez & Joe: In Celebration of Lester Young (GNP, 1979)
- Paul Williams, Here Comes Inspiration (A&M, 1974)
- Si Zentner, Rhythm Plus Blues (Liberty, 1963)

== Bibliography ==
- Hendrickson, Al; Almeida, Laurindo; Heitmeyer, Howard; Pitman, Bill; Kessel, Barney; Bain, Bob; Marshall, Jack; Roberts, Howard (1961). West Coast Guitar: Eight Original Solos for Guitar. New York: Leeds Music Corporation. ASIN B0080YPG16.
- Hendrickson, Al; Orzeck, Art (1974). Encyclopedia of Bass Chords, Arpeggios & Scales. Mel Bay Publications. ISBN 978-0871668233.
- Hendrickson, Al; Orzeck, Art (2010). Guitar Duets on Great Classic Themes. Mel Bay Publications. ISBN 978-0786631896.
