= Herbie Harper =

American jazz trombonist (1920–2012)

Herbert Harper (2 July 1920 — 21 January 2012) was an American jazz trombonist of the West Coast jazz school.

Born in Salina, Kansas, he played swing music with Benny Goodman and Charlie Spivak in the 1940s and 1950s. Working on the West Coast jazz scene, he performed with such musicians as Stan Kenton, Bill Perkins and Maynard Ferguson, among others.

In June 1949, he was a member of the band backing Billie Holiday on her Just Jazz radio broadcast for AFRS in Los Angeles. Other band members were Neal Hefti (trumpet), Herbie Steward (clarinet, tenor saxophone), Jimmy Rowles (piano), Robert "Iggy" Shevak (bass) and Roy "Blinky" Garner (drums).

In 1954, he recorded several sessions as a member of Steve White's Hollywood-based quartet.

== Discography ==
=== As leader ===
- Herbie Harper Quintet Featuring Bob Gordon: Jazz in Hollywood Series (Nocturne, 1954)
- Herbie Harper Quartet/Quintet (Nocturne, 1954)
- Herbie Harper (Bethlehem, 1955)
- Herbie Harper Quintet (Tampa, 1955)
- Herbie Harper Featuring Bud Shank and Bob Gordon (Liberty, 1956)
- Herbie Harper Sextet! (Mode, 1957)
- Herbie Harper Revisited (Sea Breeze, 1983)
- Two Brothers with Bill Perkins (V.S.O.P. 1992)

=== As sideman ===
With Benny Carter

- Aspects (United Artists, 1959)
- The Benny Carter Jazz Calendar (United Artists, 1959)
- Plays Cole Porter's Can-Can and Anything Goes (Lone Hill, 2009)

With Bob Florence

- Name Band: 1959 (Carlton 1959)
- Bongos/Reeds/Brass (HiFi, 1960)
- Here and Now!/Bold, Swinging Big Band Ideas (Liberty, 1964)
- Live at Concerts by the Sea (Trend, 1980)
- Westlake (Discovery, 1981)
- Soaring (Bosco, 1983)
- Magic Time (Trend, 1984)
- Trash Can City (Trend, 1987)
- State of the Art (USA, 1988)

With Stan Kenton

- By Request (Creative World, 1971)
- By Request Vol. II (Creative World, 1972)
- By Request Vol. III (Creative World, 1973)

With Pete Rugolo

- Adventures in Rhythm (Columbia, 1954)
- Introducing Pete Rugolo (Columbia, 1954)
- Rugolomania (Columbia, 1955)
- Music for Hi-Fi Bugs (EmArcy, 1956)
- New Sounds by Pete Rugolo (Harmony, 1957)
- Out on a Limb (EmArcy, 1957)
- Percussion at Work (EmArcy, 1958)
- An Adventure in Sound: Brass in Hi-Fi (Mercury 1958)
- 10 Trombones Like 2 Pianos (Mercury, 1961)

With others

- Louis Bellson, The Exciting Mr. Bellson and His Big Band (Norgran, 1954)
- Louis Bellson, Skin Deep (Norgran, 1955)
- June Christy, Something Cool (Capitol, 1955)
- Ray Brown, Bass Hit! (Verve, 1957)
- Vikki Carr, Live at the Greek Theatre (Columbia, 1973)
- Nat King Cole, Nat King Cole (Capitol, 1992)
- Teddy Edwards, Central Avenue Breakdown Vol. 1 (Onyx 1974)
- Salvador Camarata, Camarata Featuring Tutti's Trombones (Coliseum, 1966)
- Barbara Dane, Livin' with the Blues (Dot, 1959)
- Craig Doerge, Craig Doerge (Columbia, 1973)
- Frank Capp, In a Tribute to the Dorsey Brothers (Kimberly, 2010)
- Frances Faye, I'm Wild Again (Bethlehem, 1955)
- Michael Feinstein, The MGM Album (Elektra, 1989)
- Maynard Ferguson, Dimensions (EmArcy, 1955)
- Maynard Ferguson, Stratospheric (Mercury, 1976)
- Russell Garcia, Four Horns and a Lush Life (Bethlehem, 1956)
- Jimmy Giuffre, Jimmy Giuffre Trios Live 1957-1958 (Raretone, 1983)
- Benny Goodman, Bebop Spoken Here (Capitol, 1972)
- Conrad Gozzo, Goz the Great! (RCA Victor, 1955)
- Jerry Gray, The Uncollected 1949–50 (Hindsight, 1985)
- Harry James, Wild About Harry! (Capitol, 1957)
- Fred Katz, Zen: The Music of Fred Katz (Pacific Jazz, 1957)
- Gene Krupa & Harry James, The Complete Capitol Recordings of Gene Krupa & Harry James (Mosaic, 1999)
- Dodo Marmarosa & Lorraine Geller, West Coast Piano Touch (Vantage, 1992)
- Big Miller, Sings, Twists, Shouts and Preaches (Columbia, 1962)
- The Monkees, Listen to the Band (Rhino, 1991)
- Roger Neumann, Introducing Roger Neumann's Rather Large Band (Sea Breeze, 1983)
- Roger Neumann, Instant Heat! (Sea Breeze, 1994)
- Harry Nilsson, ...That's the Way It Is (RCA Victor, 1976)
- Marty Paich, The Picasso of Big Band Jazz (Discovery, 1982)
- Nicolas Peyrac, Elle Sortait D'Un Drole De Cafe (CBS, 1982)
- Dory Previn, Mythical Kings and Iguanas (United Artists, 1971)
- Shorty Rogers, The Shorty Rogers Big Band Live 1953 (Scarecrow, 1979)
- Charlie Spivak, The Uncollected Charlie Spivak and His Orchestra 1943–46 (Hindsight, 1977)
- Mel Tormé, et al., The Complete George Gershwin Porgy and Bess (Bethlehem, 1956 [1996])
- Steve White, Jazz in Hollywood Series (Nocturne/OJC, 1997)
- Jimmy Witherspoon, Spoon (Reprise, 1961; Collectables, 2006)
