= Uan Rasey =

American trumpeter (1921–2011)

- Born: August 22, 1921; Glasgow, Montana, U.S.
- Died: September 26, 2011 (aged 90) Los Angeles, California, U.S.
- Genres: Jazz; pop; classical
- Occupation: Musician
- Instrument: Trumpet

Uan Rasey (August 22, 1921 – September 26, 2011) was an American musician, best known for his studio work as a trumpet player.

== Biography ==
Rasey was born in Glasgow, Montana, on August 22, 1921. He taught himself to play the trumpet as a child. He moved with his family to Los Angeles in 1937, where he began playing professionally with such band leaders as Sonny Dunham, Ozzie Nelson and Alvino Rey.

He contracted polio as a child and spent his career playing trumpet while using crutches. Despite his condition, Rasey was a track and field fan, regularly attending events. He reportedly turned down MGM’s initial offer to join their film studio orchestra because he wanted his contract to stipulate that he would not be required to work Saturdays, when he attended track meets, and that he could go on leave during the 1952 Summer Olympics.

Rasey was a first-call trumpet player for MGM and other studio orchestras from 1949 until the early 1970s. He played trumpet for many film soundtracks, including An American in Paris, Ben-Hur, Bye Bye Birdie, Cleopatra, Gigi, How the West Was Won, My Fair Lady, Singin' in the Rain, Spartacus and West Side Story. One of his most memorable performances was in the film All the Fine Young Cannibals (1960) where he provided the music for Robert Wagner's trumpet-player character Chad Bixby. Rasey's other films included Taxi Driver, High Anxiety and Pennies From Heaven. Rasey is known for his solo in composer Jerry Goldsmith's Oscar-nominated score for Roman Polanski's 1974 film Chinatown. He also played on many scores for television and radio, and in live orchestras throughout Los Angeles.

Rasey was an active session musician and performed on many albums in the 1950s and 1960s, including those of Frank Sinatra, Nat King Cole, Mel Tormé, Doris Day, Frankie Laine, Judy Garland, and the Monkees.

He lived in Southern California, where he taught privately into his old age. His pupils included Arturo Sandoval and Jack Sheldon. He died in Los Angeles on September 26, 2011, at the Kaiser Permanente Woodland Hills Medical Center, from a heart disorder.

== Legacy ==
Rasey was widely considered one of the finest musicians in Hollywood history. In May 2009 he received the International Trumpet Guild's Honorary Award, their highest honor.

== Instrument ==
Rasey originally used an Olds Recording-model trumpet, made for him in 1949 shortly after he was hired by MGM. In an interview, he related how they made it using the Olds' Ambassador valve section, with the bell length the same as the Super, and the mouthpipe from the old Super Recording. In 1974 he also began playing a King Silver Flair trumpet, which he used for the Chinatown soundtrack, and alternated between the two.

== Selected discography ==
=== EP's ===
- Sammy Davis Jr., Bye Bye Blackbird (Reprise Holland, 1965)

=== Albums ===
- Frank Sinatra, with orchestra conducted by Constantin Bakaleinikoff, Higher and Higher (RKO, 1944)
- June Christy, Something Cool (Capitol, 1955)
- Pete Rugolo, Rugolomania (Columbia, 1955)
- Pete Rugolo, New Sounds by Pete Rugolo (Harmony, 1954–55, [1957])
- The Four Freshmen, 4 Freshmen and 5 Trumpets (Capitol, 1957)
- Pete Rugolo, Percussion at Work (EmArcy, 1957)
- Peggy Lee, Things Are Swingin' (Capitol, 1958)
- Benny Carter, Aspects (United Artists, 1959)
- Van Alexander and his orchestra, The Home Of Happy Feet (Capitol, 1959)
- Henry Mancini, Peter Gunn (RCA Victor, 1959)
- Judy Garland with John Ireland, The Letter (Capitol, 1959)
- Benny Carter and his orchestra, Aspects (United Artists, 1959)
- André Kostelanetz and his orchestra with André Previn, Gershwin – Rhapsody In Blue, Concerto In F (Columbia, 1960)
- Pete Rugolo - The Original Music of Thriller (Time, 1961)
- Louis Bellson his drums & orchestra, Around The World In Percussion (Roulette, 1961)
- Pete Rugolo - Ten Trumpets and 2 Guitars (Mercury, 1961)
- Glen Gray & the Casa Loma Orchestra, Please, Mr. Gray (Capitol, 1961)
- Louis Bellson, Big Band Jazz from the Summit (Roulette, 1962)
- Al Hirt with orchestra arranged and conducted By Billy May, Horn A-Plenty (RCA Victor, 1962)
