= George Roberts (trombonist) =

American trombonist

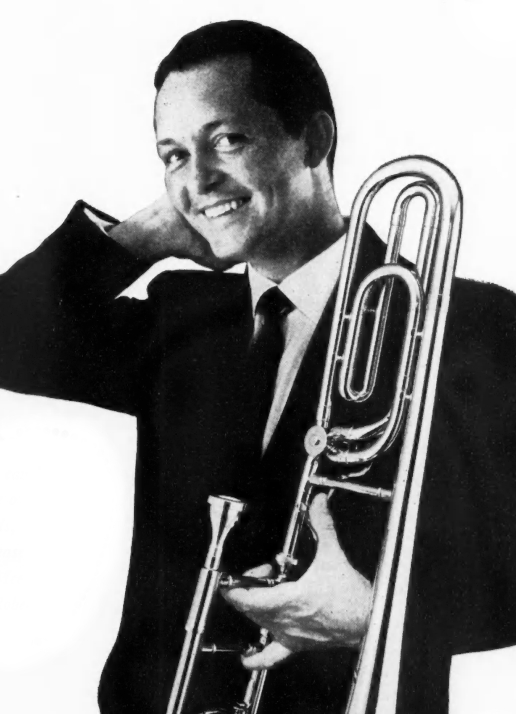
- Roberts in an advertisement

Background information
- Born: March 22, 1928; Des Moines, Iowa, U.S.
- Died: September 28, 2014 (aged 86) Fallbrook, California, U.S.
- Genres: Jazz
- Instruments: Trombone, bass trombone

George Mortimer Roberts (March 22, 1928 – September 28, 2014) was an American trombonist.

== Career ==
Born and raised in Des Moines, Iowa, Roberts began his career after service in the United States Navy.

Roberts was a member of the Ray Robbins band, then quit to join Gene Krupa in 1947 when he was in the same section with Urbie Green. It was Urbie's lyric tenor trombone playing that inspired George to be an "Urbie" one octave lower. After the Krupa band broke up in 1949, Roberts was a freelance musician in Reno, Nevada, for a year before being hired by Stan Kenton to replace Bart Varsalona, who had left the band during its 1949–1950 hiatus. Roberts opted to stay in Los Angeles rather than go with Kenton on his 1953 European tour.

Working freelance again, he was introduced to Nelson Riddle by Lee Gillette, one of the executives at Capitol Records who had produced Kenton's recordings. Roberts began recording with Riddle, Don Costa, Billy May, Axel Stordahl, Gordon Jenkins, and Henry Mancini in sessions with Frank Sinatra, Tony Bennett, Ella Fitzgerald, Judy Garland, Sarah Vaughan, and Nat King Cole. As a Hollywood studio musician, Roberts recorded film scores such as Jaws, King Kong, Close Encounters of the Third Kind and served on the staff orchestras of the radio and television networks. Before retiring, he had performed on over 6000 recordings.

== Personal life ==
Roberts died from pneumonia on September 28, 2014, at the age of 86 in Fallbrook, California. He also had multiple sclerosis.

== Discography ==
=== As leader ===
- Meet Mr. Roberts (Columbia, 1959)
- Bottoms Up (Columbia, 1960)
- Let George Do It (Regal, 1968)
- Practice Makes Perfect (DNE, 1969)

=== As sideman ===
With Stan Kenton

- A Presentation of Progressive Jazz (Capitol, 1948)
- New Concepts of Artistry in Rhythm (Capitol, 1953)
- Popular Favorites by Stan Kenton (Capitol, 1953)
- Sketches on Standards (Capitol, 1953)
- This Modern World (Capitol, 1953)
- Portraits on Standards (Capitol, 1953)
- Kenton Showcase (Capitol, 1954)
- The Kenton Era (Capitol, 1955)
- Kenton with Voices (Capitol, 1957)
- Hair (Capitol, 1969)

With Skip Martin

- Scheherajazz (Somerset, 1959)
- Swingin' with Prince Igor (Sonic Workshop, 1960)
- Perspectives in Percussion Volume 2 (Stereo-Fidelity, 1961)

With Shorty Rogers

- Shorty Rogers Plays Richard Rodgers (RCA Victor, 1957)
- Portrait of Shorty (RCA Victor, 1958)
- Afro-Cuban Influence (RCA Victor, 1958)
- The Swingin' Nutcracker (RCA Victor, 1960)
- An Invisible Orchard (RCA Victor, 1961 [1997])
- The Fourth Dimension in Sound (Warner Bros., 1962)
- Jazz Waltz (Reprise, 1962)

With Pete Rugolo

- Rugolomania (Columbia, 1955)
- Music for Hi-Fi Bugs (EmArcy, 1956)
- Out on a Limb (EmArcy, 1956)
- New Sounds by Pete Rugolo (Harmony, 1957)
- An Adventure in Sound: Brass in Hi-Fi (Mercury 1958)
- The Music from Richard Diamond (EmArcy, 1959)
- 10 Trombones Like 2 Pianos (Mercury, 1961)
- The Original Music of Thriller (Time, 1961)

With Lalo Schifrin

- Music from Mission: Impossible (Dot, 1967)
- More Mission: Impossible (Paramount, 1968)
- Mannix (Paramount, 1968)
- Kelly's Heroes (soundtrack) (MGM, 1970)
- Enter the Dragon (soundtrack) (Warner Bros., 1973)

With others

- Ray Anthony, Sound Spectacular (Capitol, 1959)
- Chet Baker, Blood, Chet and Tears (Verve, 1970)
- Gabe Baltazar, Stan Kenton Presents Gabe Baltazar (Creative World, 1979)
- Louie Bellson, Louis Bellson Swings Jule Styne (Verve, 1960)
- Elmer Bernstein, The Man with the Golden Arm (Decca, 1956)
- Buddy Bregman, Swingin' Standards (World Pacific, 1959)
- Frank Capp, Percussion in a Tribute to Henry Mancini (Kimberly, 1961)
- Ralph Carmichael, Hymns at Sunset (Capitol, 1962)
- Ralph Carmichael, Brass Choir (Light, 1971)
- Benny Carter, Aspects (United Artists, 1959)
- Benny Carter, The Benny Carter Jazz Calendar (United Artists, 1959)
- Nat King Cole, The Piano Style of Nat King Cole (Capitol, 1956)
- Frank Comstock, Frank Comstock and His Orchestra 1962 (1969)
- Bing Crosby and Buddy Bregman, Bing Sings Whilst Bregman Swings (Verve, 1956)
- Alexander Courage, Hot Rod Rumble (Liberty, 1957)
- Jackie Davis, Jackie Davis Meets the Trombones (Capitol, 1959)
- Sammy Davis Jr., It's All Over but the Swingin' (Decca, 1957)
- Neil Diamond, Tap Root Manuscript (UNI, 1970)
- Buddy Ebsen, Howdy Hillbillies (Valiant, 1970)
- Dennis Farnon, Caution! Men Swinging (ABC, 1957)
- Jerry Fielding, Magnificence in Brass (Time, 1961)
- Ella Fitzgerald, Sings the Jerome Kern Songbook (Verve, 1963)
- Pete Fountain, South Rampart Street Parade (Coral, 1963)
- Pete Fountain, Mr. New Orleans (MCA, 1973)
- Dominic Frontiere, Washington: Behind Closed Doors (ABC, 1977)
- The Four Freshmen, Four Freshmen and 5 Trombones (Capitol, 1955)
- Glen Gray, Please, Mr. Gray (Capitol, 1961)
- Neal Hefti, Jazz Pops (Reprise, 1962)
- Harry James, More Harry James in Hi-fi (Capitol, 1956)
- Harry James, More Harry James in Hi-Fi Part 3 (Capitol, 1956)
- Harry James, More Harry James in Hi-fi Part 4 (Capitol, 1956)
- Fred Katz, Folk Songs for Far Out Folk (Warner Bros., 1959)
- Junior Mance, Get Ready, Set, Jump!!! (Capitol, 1964)
- Junior Mance, Straight Ahead! (Capitol, 1965)
- Henry Mancini, Uniquely Mancini (ABC, 1963)
- Henry Mancini, Mancini '67 (ABC, 1967)
- Billy May, Billy May's Big Fat Brass (Capitol, 1958)
- Billy May, Verlye Mills, Harp with a Beat (HiFi, 1959)
- Billy May, Bill's Bag (Capitol, 1963)
- Hugo Montenegro, Process 70 (Time, 1962)
- Peter Nero, The Wiz (Crystal Clear, 1977)
- Anita O'Day, Pick Yourself Up (Verve, 1956)
- Ruth Olay, Olay! The New Sound of Ruth Olay (Mercury, 1959)
- Marty Paich, I Get a Boot Out of You (Warner Bros., 1959)
- Marty Paich, The Broadway Bit (Warner Bros., 1959)
- Tommy Pederson, All My Friends Are Trombone Players (Patrice 1964)
- Dave Pell, Dave Pell Plays Duke Ellington's Big Band Sounds (P.R.I. 1960)
- Billy Preston & Syreeta, Music from the Motion Picture Fast Break (Motown, 1979)
- Henri Rene, The Swinging '59 (Imperial, 1960)
- The Singers Unlimited, Friends (Pausa, 1977)
- Leith Stevens, Private Hell (Coral, 1956)
- Jack Teagarden, This Is Teagarden! (Capitol, 1956)
- Dan Terry, Lonely Place (P.R.I., 1969)
- Cal Tjader, West Side Story (Fantasy, 1960)
- Sarah Vaughan, Orchestra Arranged and Conducted by Michel Legrand (Mainstream, 1973)
- Joe Williams, With Love (Temponic, 1972)
- Stanley Wilson, The Music from "M Squad" (ABC, 1959)
