= Bivona (surname) =

Bivona is a surname. Notable people with the surname include:

- Gus Bivona (1915–1996), American reed player
- Kevin Bivona (born 1986), American musician and audio engineer
