= Ronnie Lang =

American saxophonist (b. 1927)

- Born: Ronald Langinger; July 24, 1927 (age 99); Chicago, Illinois; United States
- Genre: Jazz
- Occupation: Musician
- Instrument: Alto saxophone

Ronnie Lang (sometimes spelled Ronny; born July 24, 1927) is an American jazz alto saxophonist. His professional début was with Hoagy Carmichael's Teenagers. He also played with Earle Spencer (1946), Ike Carpenter, and Skinnay Ennis (1947). Lang gained attention during his two tenures with Les Brown's Orchestra (1949–50 and 1953–56). He recorded with the Dave Pell Octet in the mid-1950s. During this time he attended Los Angeles State College of Applied Arts and Sciences studying music and woodwinds. In 1958 he became a prolific studio musician in Los Angeles, often employed by Henry Mancini, and he played the iconic sax melodic line in Bernard Herrmann's score for the movie Taxi Driver (1976). Lang also recorded with Pete Rugolo (1956), Bob Thiele (1975), and Peggy Lee (1975).

== Partial discography ==
With Sammy Davis Jr

- It's All Over but the Swingin' (Decca, 1957)

With Ted Nash

- Peter Gunn (Crown, 1959)

With Pete Rugolo

- Music for Hi-Fi Bugs (EmArcy, 1956)
- Out on a Limb (EmArcy, 1956)
- The Original Music of Thriller (Time, 1961)

With His All Stars

- Modern Jazz (Tops, 1958)

== Television soundtracks ==
With the Vince Guaraldi Sextet

- It's the Great Pumpkin, Charlie Brown (1966)
- You're in Love, Charlie Brown (1967)
