= Fred Fox (musician) =

American musician (1914–2019)

- Born: July 14, 1914; Brooklyn, New York
- Died: May 21, 2019 (aged 104); California
- Occupation: French horn player
- Children: Alan C. Fox

Fred Fox (July 14, 1914 – May 21, 2019) was an American French horn player, brass instrument teacher, and former namesake of the University of Arizona Fred Fox School of Music.

== Musician ==
Fred Fox attended the Juilliard School in the early 1930s, where he also played with the New York Philharmonic, conducted by Arturo Toscanini, and performed as solo French horn player with the National Symphony Orchestra (1931–32). In 1934, Fox left Juilliard to play with the Minneapolis Symphony, and then at the age of 21, he moved to California to join the Los Angeles Philharmonic. Fox spent the rest of his career in Los Angeles, touring with Xavier Cugat (1954), Stan Kenton (1956), and the Roger Wagner Chorale (1965), and playing on the soundtracks of many motion picture films for both Paramount Pictures and RKO Pictures, including The Flight of the Phoenix and Patton. His Hollywood work was recently featured in the 2015 documentary 1M1: Hollywood Horns of the Golden Years. Fox has also played on albums for a variety of musicians, including Frank Sinatra and Tommy Sands.

== Teacher ==
Fox served on the faculties of California State University-Northridge, University of Southern California, Pepperdine College, and the Music Academy of the West. He was also professor of brass instruments at California State University-Los Angeles. His students include Henry Sigismonti, Hyman Markowitz, and Richard Linenhahn, University of Arizona professor Daniel Katzen, and Jim Thatcher. Fox has also authored several books, including Essentials of Brass Playing, published in 1974, which is still considered an important resource for brass musicians

== Honors and awards ==
In 2011, Fox was honored with the Punto Award at the International Horn Symposium in San Francisco, which is given to individuals who have made a major contribution at the regional or national level to the art of horn playing.

In 2012, the University of Arizona named their “Fred Fox Graduate Wind Quintet” after him, and in 2015, the university renamed its music school, The Fred Fox School of Music, when his son, Alan C. Fox, made a donation of $20 million to the school.

== Personal life ==
Fox was born in Brooklyn in 1914. He and his late wife Freida, a trumpet player, had two sons, David and Alan. At the age of 104, Fox was still active, teaching music, traveling, and engaging in the community. Fred Fox died in May 2019 at the age of 104.

== Discography ==
With Pete Rugolo

- Introducing Pete Rugolo (Columbia, 1954)
- Adventures in Rhythm (Columbia, 1954)
- New Sounds by Pete Rugolo (Harmony, 1954–55, [1957])
