= Adventures in Rhythm =

Studio album by Pete Rugolo and His Orchestra
- Released: 1954
- Recorded: April 28 & 29, May 10, June 21 and July 8, 1954
- Studio: Goldwyn Studios, Hollywood, CA
- Genre: Jazz
- Label: Columbia; CL 604
- Producer: Paul Weston

Pete Rugolo chronology
Introducing Pete Rugolo (1954)	Adventures in Rhythm (1954)	Rugolomania (1955)

Adventures in Rhythm is an album by bandleader, composer, arranger and conductor Pete Rugolo featuring performances recorded in 1954 and originally released on the Columbia label as a 12-inch LP.

== Reception ==
Professional ratings
Review scores
Source	Rating
Allmusic	4.5/5 stars

The Allmusic review by Scott Yanow noted: "Pete Rugolo's arrangements are full of surprises while leaving space for his sidemen's short solos. Well worth searching for".

== Track listing ==
All compositions by Pete Rugolo except where noted.

1. "Here's Pete" - 2:25
2. "My Funny Valentine" (Richard Rodgers, Lorenz Hart) - 2:51
3. "Mixin' the Blues" - 3:13
4. "Poinciana (Song of the Tree)" (Nat Simon, Buddy Bernier) - 3:20
5. "Rugolo Meets Shearing" (Herman Saunders, Lloyd Lunham, Rugolo) - 2:49
6. "Sambamba" (Les Baxter) - 2:24
7. "King Porter Stomp" (Jelly Roll Morton) - 2:49
8. "You Are Too Beautiful" (Rodgers, Hart) - 2:53
9. "Jingle Bells Mambo" - 2:52
10. "There Will Never Be Another You" (Harry Warren, Mack Gordon) - 2:22
11. "Conversation" (José Ferrer) - 3:52
12. "Good Evening Friends Boogie" - 3:22
- Recorded in Los Angeles, CA on April 28, 1954 (tracks 7 & 12), April 29, 1954 (tracks 2, 4 & 9), May 10, 1954 (tracks 3 & 5), June 21, 1954 (tracks 1, 8, 10 & 11) and July 8, 1954 (track 6).

== Personnel ==
- Pete Rugolo - arranger, conductor
- Pete Candoli, Maynard Ferguson, Conrad Gozzo, Shorty Rogers - trumpet
- Milt Bernhart, Harry Betts, John Haliburton, Herbie Harper - trombone
- Fred Fox, John Graas - French horn
- Paul Sarmento - tuba
- Harry Klee, Bud Shank - alto saxophone, flute
- Bob Cooper - tenor saxophone, oboe
- Jimmy Giuffre - tenor saxophone, baritone saxophone
- Bob Gordon - baritone saxophone
- Claude Williamson - piano
- Howard Roberts - guitar
- Harry Babasin - bass
- Shelly Manne - drums
- Bernie Mattison - percussion
