= Aspects (Benny Carter album) =

Studio album by Benny Carter Quartet
- Released: 1959
- Recorded: 1958
- Studio: Los Angeles, CA
- Genre: Jazz
- Length: 46:42
- Label: United Artists; UAL-4017/UAS-5017
- Producer: Benny Carter

Benny Carter chronology
Swingin' the '20s (1958)	Aspects (1959)	Sax ala Carter! (1960)

The Benny Carter Jazz Calendar cover

Aspects (also released as The Jazz Calendar of Benny Carter) is an album by saxophonist/composer Benny Carter recorded in late summer 1958 and originally released by the United Artists label the following year.

== Reception ==
Professional ratings
Review scores
Source	Rating
AllMusic	4/5 stars

AllMusic reviewer Scott Yanow stated: "Although originally associated with big bands, the set has what was Benny Carter's only big-band recording as a playing leader during 1947–86. While the song titles are a bit gimmicky, saluting the 12 months of the year, the music is solid, mainstream big-band swing. ... Two overlapping big bands were utilized, and the music alternates between being forceful and lyrical."

== Track listing ==
All compositions by Benny Carter, except where indicated.

1. "June in January" (Ralph Rainger, Leo Robin) – 3:12
2. "February Fiesta" (Hal Schaefer) – 1:54
3. "March Wind" – 3:16
4. "I'll Remember April" (Gene de Paul, Patricia Johnston, Don Raye) – 3:21
5. "One Morning in May" (Hoagy Carmichael, Mitchell Parish) – 2:49
6. "June Is Bustin' Out All Over" (Richard Rodgers, Oscar Hammerstein II) – 2:59
7. "Sleigh Ride in July" (Jimmy Van Heusen, Johnny Burke) – 2:50
8. "August Moon" – 3:39
9. "September Song" (Kurt Weill, Maxwell Anderson) – 2:39
10. "Something for October" – 2:52
11. "Swingin' in November" – 3:02
12. "Roses in December" (Ben Oakland, Herb Magidson, George Jessel) – 2:36
13. "February Fiesta" [mono take] (Schaefer) – 1:55 Additional track on CD reissue
14. "June Is Bustin' Out All Over" [mono take] (Rogers, Hammerstein) – 3:00 Additional track on CD reissue
15. "August Moon" [mono take] – 3:33 Additional track on CD reissue
16. "Swingin' in November" [mono take] – 3:05 Additional track on CD reissue

== Personnel ==
- Benny Carter – alto saxophone, arranger

Tracks 1, 2, 4, 5, 8, 9 & 13:

- Pete Candoli, Conrad Gozzo, Uan Rasey, Shorty Sherock – trumpet
- Herbie Harper, Tommy Pederson, George Roberts – trombone
- Buddy Collette, Chuck Gentry, Justin Gordon, Bill Green – saxophone
- Arnold Ross – piano
- Larry Bunker – vibraphone
- Bobby Gibbons – guitar
- Joe Comfort – bass
- Shelly Manne – drums

Tracks 3, 6, 7, 10–12 & 14–16:

- Joe Gordon, Al Porcino, Ray Triscari, Stu Williamson – trumpet
- Russ Brown, Tommy Pederson, Frank Rosolino – trombone
- Buddy Collette, Jewell Grant, Bill Green, Plas Johnson – saxophone
- Gerald Wiggins – piano
- Barney Kessel – guitar
- Joe Comfort – bass
- Shelly Manne – drums
