= Jack Costanzo =

American percussionist (1919–2018)

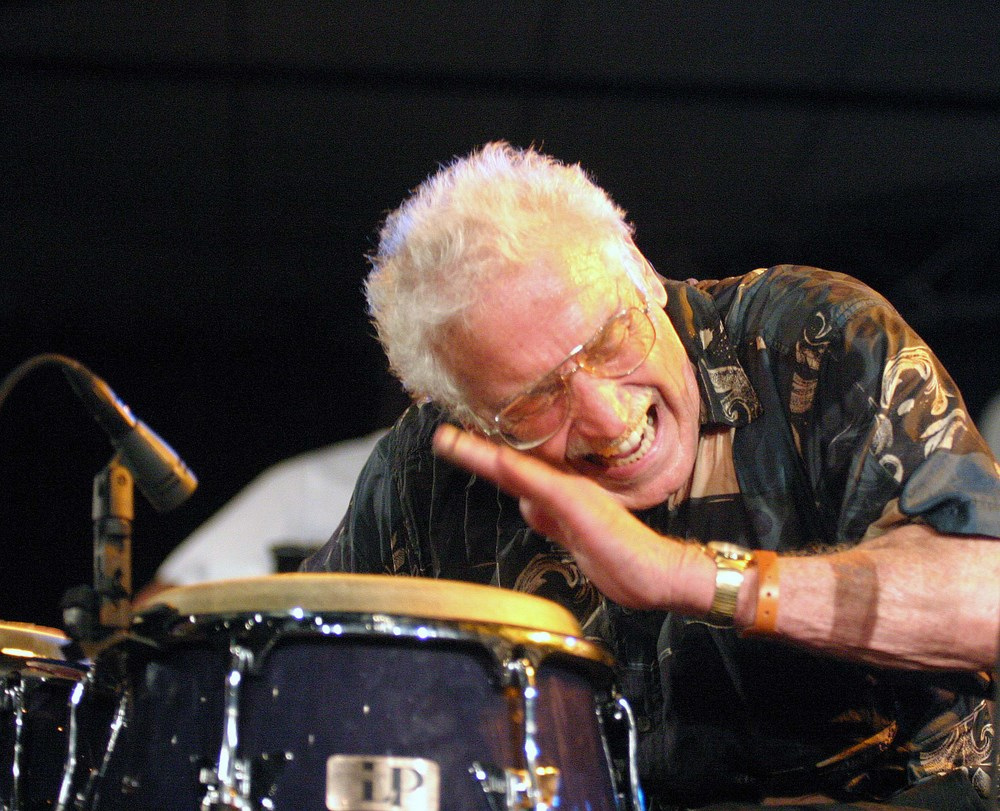
- Costanzo in a performance in 2003

Background information
- Born: September 24, 1919; Chicago, Illinois, US
- Died: August 18, 2018 (aged 98) Lakeside, California, U.S.
- Genres: Afro-Cuban
- Occupations: Musician, dancer, bandleader, composer
- Instruments: Bongos, conga
- Years active: 1947 - 2018

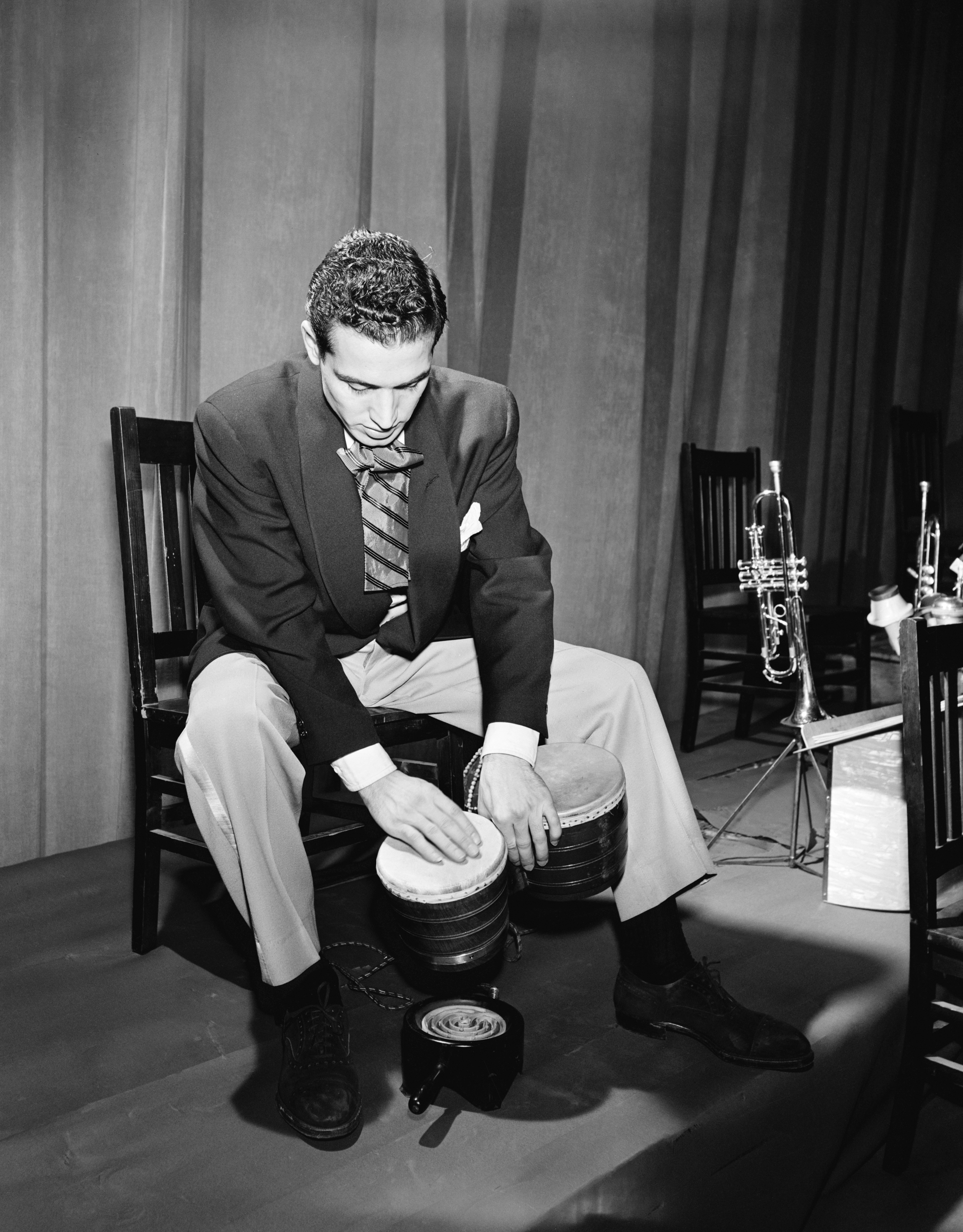
Costanzo in 1947-48

Jack James Costanzo (September 24, 1919 – August 18, 2018) was an American percussionist.

== Biography ==
Costanzo is of Italian descent, both his parents being from Italy. A composer and drummer, Costanzo is best known for having been a bongo player, and was nicknamed "Mr. Bongo". He visited Havana three times in the 1940s and learned to play Afro-Cuban rhythms on the bongos and congas.

Costanzo started as a dancer, touring as a team with his wife before World War II. After his discharge from the Navy, he worked as a dance instructor at the Beverly Hills Hotel, where Latin band leader Bobby Ramos heard Costanzo playing bongos in a jam session and offered him a job. Throughout the 1940s, Costanzo worked with several Latin bands, including a revived version of the Lecuona Cuban Boys, Desi Arnaz, and Rene Touzet.

Costanzo toured with Stan Kenton from 1947 to 1948 and occasionally in the 1950s, and played with Nat King Cole from 1949 to 1953. He also played with the Billy May Orchestra, Peggy Lee, Danny Kaye, Perez Prado, Charlie Barnet, Pete Rugolo, Betty Grable, Harry James, Judy Garland, Patti Page, Jane Powell, Ray Anthony, Martin & Lewis, Frances Faye, Dinah Shore, Xavier Cugat, Frank Sinatra, Tony Curtis, and Eddie Fisher.

Costanzo formed his own band in the 1950s which recorded and toured internationally. Many Hollywood stars studied bongos with him, including Marlon Brando, Rita Moreno, Carolyn Jones, Hugh O'Brian, Keenan Wynn, Van Johnson, Tony Curtis, Betty Grable, Vic Damone, James Dean, and Gary Cooper.

Costanzo was in retirement until 1998 when he decided to make a comeback and in 2001 recorded Back From Havana under the Ubiquity Records umbrella. This album featured the likes of Black Note's Gilbert Castellanos, Steve Firerobing and the Panamanian singer Marilu. In 2002 he released another album with the same cast called Scorching the Skins; this time he also added Quino from Big Mountain. Costanzo continued to tour and perform in California and abroad.

Costanzo died of complications from a ruptured abdominal aortic aneurysm at his home in Lakeside, California, on August 18, 2018, aged 98.

== Discography ==
Albums

- 1949: Nat King Cole & His Trio - The Forgotten 1949 Carnegie Hall Concert (Hep) 2010 CD
- 1954: Afro Cuban Jazz North-of-the-Border (Norgan)
- 1954: Afro-Cubano (Norgan)
- 1956: Mr. Bongo Has Brass (Zephyr) 12003
- 1956: Jack Costanzo and His Afro Cuban Band (GNP Crescendo) GNP-19
- 1956: Mr. Bongo Afro Cuban Band (Palladium) PLP 126
- 1957: King of the Bongos (Clarity)
- 1957: Mr. Bongo Plays Hi-Fi Cha Cha (Tops) 1564
- 1958: Latin Fever (Liberty) LRP-3093
- 1959: Bongo Fever (Sunset) SUS-5134
- 1960: Bongo Cha-Cha-Cha! (Golden Tone) C 4061
- 1960: Afro Can Can (Liberty) LRP-3137
- 1961: Learn–Play Bongos (Liberty) LRP-3177
- 1961: Naked City & Other Themes (Liberty) LST-7195
- 1968: Latin Percussion with Soul (Tico) SLP 1177 (with Gerry Woo)
- 1971: Viva Tirado (GNP Crescendo) GNPS 2057 (with Gerry Woo)
- 2001: Back from Havana (Cubop) CBLP 028
- 2002: Scorching the Skins (Ubiquity) CBCD 037
- 2005: Versatile Mr. Bongo Plays Jazz, Afro and Latin

Selected singles

- A: "Mambo Costanzo" B: "Mr. Bongo" 1954
- A: "Barracuda" B: "I Got A Bongo" 1959
- A: "Viva Tirado" B: "Guantanamera"

With Stan Kenton

- Stan Kenton's Milestones (Capitol, 1943–47 [1950])
- Stan Kenton Classics (Capitol, 1944–47 [1952])
- Encores (Capitol, 1947)
- A Presentation of Progressive Jazz (Capitol, 1947)
- The Kenton Era (Capitol, 1940–54 [1955])
- Kenton with Voices (Capitol, 1957)

With Art Pepper and Conte Candoli

- Mucho Calor (Andex, 1957)

With Pete Rugolo

- Rugolomania (Columbia, 1955)
- New Sounds by Pete Rugolo (Harmony, 1954–55 [1957])
- Percussion at Work (EmArcy, 1957)

== Filmography ==
- The Delicate Delinquent
- Man From the Diners Club
- Stool Pigeon Number 1
- The Ed Sullivan Show (TV), three appearances, as himself
- The Art Linkletter Show (TV), as himself
- The Edward R. Murrow Show (TV), as himself
- 1950: King Cole and His Trio with Benny Carter and His Orchestra, a Universal-International featurette, musician
- 1956: G.E. True Theater (TV series) - Judy Garland Musical Special, Musician
- 1956: Riddles in Rhythm (short), as himself
- 1957: The Nat King Cole Show (TV series), musician on song "Caravan"
- 1957: Bernardine, as himself
- 1957: The Dinah Shore Chevy Show (TV Series) - Episode No. 2.10, as himself
- 1959: The Danny Thomas Show (TV Series) - Terry Goes Bohemian
- 1959: Johnny Staccato (TV Series) - Nature of the Night, Musician
- 1960: Visit to a Small Planet, Percussionist
- 1965: Harum Scarum, Julna
- 1965: The Satan Bug, Musician
- 2006: American Masters (TV series documentary) - The World of Nat King Cole, as himself
