= New Sounds by Pete Rugolo =

Studio album by Pete Rugolo and His Orchestra
- Released: 1957
- Recorded: February 8 & 22, April 29, May 10, June 21, July 8, and October 11, 1954, and February 11, 1955; Los Angeles and New York City
- Genre: Jazz
- Labels: Harmony; HL 7003
- Producer: Paul Weston

Pete Rugolo chronology
Rugolomania (1955)	New Sounds by Pete Rugolo (1957)	Music for Hi-Fi Bugs (1956)

New Sounds by Pete Rugolo is an album by composer, arranger and conductor Pete Rugolo, of performances recorded in 1954 and 1955 for Columbia Records and first released on the budget Harmony label in 1957.

== Reception ==
Professional ratings
Review scores
Source	Rating
AllMusic	4/5 stars

Allmusic rated the album with 4 stars.

== Track listing ==
All compositions by Pete Rugolo, except where indicated.

1. "Shave and a Haircut" – 3:15
2. "Latin Nocturne" – 2:51
3. "The Shrike" (José Ferrer) – 3:50
4. "Poinciana (Song of the Tree)" (Nat Simon, Buddy Bernier) – 2:17
5. "Manhattan Mambo" (Al Frisch, Allan Roberts) – 2:58
6. "Quiet Village (Cha-Cha-Cha)" (Les Baxter) – 2:57
7. "When Your Lover Has Gone" (Einar Aaron Swan) – 3:51
8. "When You're Smiling (The Whole World Smiles With You)" (Mark Fisher, Joe Goodwin, Larry Shay) – 2:10
9. "Come Back Little Rocket" – 2:31
10. "You Stepped Out of a Dream" (Nacio Herb Brown, Gus Kahn) – 2:12
- Recorded in Los Angeles, CA on February 8, 1954 (track 9), February 24, 1954 (track 10), April 29, 1954 (track 4), May 10, 1954 (track 2), June 21, 1954 (tracks 1 & 3), July 8, 1954 (track 5), February 11, 1955 (tracks 6 & 8) and in New York City on October 11, 1954 (track 7).

== Personnel ==
- Pete Rugolo – arranger, conductor
- Pete Candoli (tracks 1–5, 9 & 10), Buddy Childers (tracks 4 & 6), Larry Fain (track 7), Maynard Ferguson (tracks 1–6, 9 & 10), Conrad Gozzo (tracks 2, 9 & 10) Mickey Mangano (track 5), Leon Meriam (track 7), Doug Mettome (tracks 7), Don Paladino (tracks 1 & 3), Uan Rasey (track 6), Shorty Rogers (tracks 1–6, 9 & 10), John Wilson (track 7) – trumpet
- Milt Bernhart (tracks 1–6 & 8–10), Eddie Bert (track 7), Harry Betts (tracks 4–6, 9 & 10), Bob Fitzpatrick (tracks 1 & 3–6), Milt Gold (track 7), John Halliburton (tracks 1–3, 9 & 10), Herbie Harper (tracks 1–3, 5, 6, 9 & 10), Frank Rehak (track 7), Kai Winding (track 7) – trombone
- George Roberts – bass trombone (tracks 2 & 4)
- John Cave (tracks 1–3), Vincent DeRosa (tracks 4 & 6), Joe Eager (track 10), Fred Fox (tracks 9 & 10), John Graas (tracks 5, 6, 8 & 9), Sinclair Lott (tracks 1–5), Stan Paley (track 7), Julius Watkins (track 7) – French horn
- Bill Barber (track 7), Paul Sarmento (tracks 1–6 & 8–10) – tuba
- Harry Klee (tracks 1–3, 6, 9 & 10), Ethmer Roten (tracks 4 & 5) – piccolo, alto saxophone
- Bud Shank – flute, alto saxophone (tracks 1–6 & 8–10)
- Herbie Mann – flute, piccolo, alto saxophone (track 7)
- Dave Schildkraut – alto saxophone, clarinet (track 7)
- Bob Cooper – tenor saxophone, oboe (tracks 1–6 & 8–10)
- Chase Dean, Joe Megro – tenor saxophone, clarinet (track 7)
- Jimmy Giuffre – tenor saxophone, baritone saxophone (tracks 1–6, 9 & 10)
- Bob Gordon (tracks 1–6, 9 & 10), Marty Flax (track 7) – baritone saxophone
- Gordon ell (track 7), Russ Freeman (track 6), Claude Williamson (tracks 1–5, 9 & 10) – piano
- Laurindo Almeida (tracks 1 & 3), Perry Lopez (track 7), Howard Roberts (tracks 2, 4, 5, 6 & 8–10) – guitar
- Harry Babasin (track 1–6 & 8–10), Whitey Mitchell (track 7) – double bass
- Shelly Manne (tracks 1–6 & 8–10), Jerry Segal (track 7) – drums
- Bernie Mattison – timpani, percussion (tracks 1–4, 6, 9 & 10)
- Jack Costanzo – bongos (track 6)
- Teddy Sommer – percussion (track 7)
- Ralph Hensel – xylophone (track 5)
- Frank Guerrero – timbales (track 5)
- Joe Guerrero – bongos, percussion (track 5)
- Lynn Franklyn – vocals (track 5)
