= Music for Hi-Fi Bugs =

Studio album by Pete Rugolo and His Orchestra
- Released: 1956
- Recorded: July 9, 10 & 11, 1956
- Studio: Capitol (Hollywood)
- Genre: Jazz
- Label: EmArcy; CL 604/MG36082

Pete Rugolo chronology
New Sounds by Pete Rugolo (1955)	Music for Hi-Fi Bugs (1956)	Out on a Limb (1956)

Music for Hi-Fi Bugs (also released as Music from Out of Space) is an album by composer, arranger and conductor Pete Rugolo featuring performances recorded in 1956 and originally released on the EmArcy label as a 12-inch LP. Tracks from this album were later released in stereo on Music from Out of Space and Rugolo Meets Rhythm.

== Reception ==
Professional ratings
Review scores
Source	Rating
AllMusic	4/5 stars

In its December 1, 1956, issue, Billboard magazine complimented the album, noting that Rugolo brought together:

. . . a big band composed of leading West Coast "modern" jazzmen and he puts them thru a number of highly original, and sometimes pungently dissonant, exercises. There is a variety of instrumentation and voicing that keeps the ear ever alert to the goings-on.

The AllMusic review by Jason Ankeny noted: "Rugolo's arrangements dazzle, boasting a rich palette of colors and tones that amplify the artistry of the individual performances".

== Track listing ==
All compositions by Pete Rugolo, except where indicated.

1. "For Hi-Fi Bugs" - 4:05
2. "Once in a While" (Michael Edwards, Bud Green) - 3:40
3. "Fawncy Meeting You" (Neal Hefti) - 4:40
4. "These Foolish Things" (Jack Strachey, Holt Marvell, Harry Link) - 4:44
5. "Later Team" - 2:52
6. "Oscar and Pete's Blues" (Oscar Peterson, Rugolo) - 8:12
7. "Dream of You" (Sy Oliver) - 5:04
8. "Snowfall" (Claude Thornhill) - 3:10
- Recorded in Los Angeles, CA on July 9, 1956 (tracks 2, 3, 5 & 7), July 10, 1956 (tracks 1 & 4) and July 11, 1956 (tracks 6 & 8).

== Personnel ==
- Pete Rugolo - arranger, conductor
- Pete Candoli, Buddy Childers (tracks 2, 3, 5 & 7), Don Fagerquist (tracks 6 & 8), Maynard Ferguson, Ray Linn (tracks 1, 4, 6 & 8), Don Paladino (tracks 1–5 & 7) - trumpet
- Milt Bernhart, Herbie Harper, Frank Rosolino - trombone
- George Roberts - bass trombone
- John Cave, Vincent DeRosa - French horn
- Clarence Karella - tuba
- Harry Klee - alto saxophone, alto flute, piccolo
- Ronny Lang - alto saxophone, flute
- Gene Cipriano, Dave Pell - tenor saxophone
- Chuck Gentry - baritone saxophone
- Russ Freeman - piano
- Howard Roberts - guitar
- Joe Mondragon - bass
- Shelly Manne - drums
- Larry Bunker - vibraphone, xylophone, percussion, timpani
