= Introducing Pete Rugolo =

Studio album by Pete Rugolo and His Orchestra
- Released: 1954
- Recorded: February 8 & 22, April 28 & 29 and July 8, 1954
- Studio: Goldwyn Studios, Hollywood, CA
- Genre: Jazz
- Label: Columbia; CL 6289 / CL 635
- Producer: Paul Weston

Pete Rugolo chronology
Introducing Pete Rugolo (1954)	Adventures in Rhythm (1955)

12 Inch LP Cover

Introducing Pete Rugolo is an album by bandleader, composer, arranger and conductor Pete Rugolo featuring performances recorded in 1954 and released on the Columbia label, initially as a 10-inch LP, then with an additional four tracks as a 12-inch LP in 1955.

== Reception ==
Professional ratings
Review scores
Source	Rating
AllMusic	4.5/5 stars

The AllMusic review by Scott Yanow commented: "This particular album finds him utilizing a big band filled with top studio and West Coast jazz players".

== Track listing ==
All compositions by Pete Rugolo, except where indicated.

1. "That Old Black Magic" (Harold Arlen, Johnny Mercer) - 2:53
2. "Early Stan" - 2:44
3. "Bazaar" (Aram Khachaturian) - 2:49
4. "California Melodies" (David Rose) - 2:44
5. "You Stepped Out of a Dream" (Nacio Herb Brown, Gus Kahn) - 2:16
6. "360 Special" - 3:02
7. "Laura" (David Raksin, Mercer) - 2:44
8. "Come Back Little Rocket" - 2:30
9. "In the Shade of the Old Apple Tree" (Egbert Van Alstyne, Harry Williams) - 2:24 Bonus track on 12 inch LP
10. "Sidewalks of New York Mambo" (Charles B. Lawlor, James W. Blake) - 3:01 Bonus track on 12 inch LP
11. "Theme from the Lombardo Ending" - 2:42 Bonus track on 12 inch LP
12. "Mañana" (Dave Barbour, Peggy Lee) - 2:26 Bonus track on 12 inch LP
- Recorded in Los Angeles, CA on February 8, 1954 (tracks 1, 2, 7 & 8), February 24, 1954 (tracks 3–6), April 28, 1954 (tracks 11 & 12), April 29, 1954 (track 9) and July 8, 1954 (track 10).

== Personnel ==
- Pete Rugolo - arranger, conductor
- Pete Candoli, Buddy Childers (track 9), Maynard Ferguson, Conrad Gozzo (tracks 1–8, 11 & 12), Mickey Mangano (track 10), Shorty Rogers - trumpet
- Milt Bernhart, Harry Betts, Bob Fitzpatrick (tracks 11 & 12), John Haliburton (tracks 1–8), Herbie Harper - trombone
- Vincent DeRosa (track 9), Joe Eager (tracks 3–6), Fred Fox (tracks 1–8, 11 & 12), John Graas (tracks 1, 2, 7, 8 & 10), Bill Hinshaw (track 11 & 12), Sinclair Lott (track 9 & 10) - French horn
- Paul Sarmento - tuba
- Harry Klee (tracks 1–8, 11 & 12), Ethmer Roten (tracks 9 & 10), Bud Shank - flute, alto saxophone
- Bob Cooper - tenor saxophone, oboe
- Jimmy Giuffre - tenor saxophone, baritone saxophone
- Bob Gordon - baritone saxophone
- Claude Williamson - piano
- Howard Roberts - guitar
- Harry Babasin - bass
- Shelly Manne - drums
- Bernie Mattison - timpani, percussion (tracks 1–9, 11 & 12)
