= TV's Top Themes =

Studio album by Pete Rugolo and His Orchestra
- Released: 1962
- Recorded: February 26, 27, 28, 1962
- Studio: United Recording Studios, Hollywood, California
- Genre: Jazz
- Label: Mercury; MG 20706/SR 60706

Pete Rugolo chronology
10 Saxophones and 2 Basses (1961)	TV's Top Themes (1962)	The Sweet Ride (1968)

TV's Top Themes is an album by composer, arranger, and conductor Pete Rugolo featuring performances of theme music from popular television programs recorded in 1962 and released on the Mercury label.

== Reception ==
Billboard Magazine, in its May 19, 1962, issue, gave TV's Top Themes its 4-star "Strong Sales Potential" rating with this review:

Pete Rugolo and his orchestra present a timely collection of TV themes wrapped in jazz-flavored treatment and utilizing the complete orchestra. Rugolo's arrangements provide the listener with a vivid and colorful picture of each show's subject matter. "Theme From Ben Casey," "Theme From Route 66," "Theme From Dr. Kildare" and "Naked CIty Theme" sound best. Dealers could do well to use packages as display items. Also good deejay material.

Cashbox Magazine was similarly upbeat in the review of the album that appeared in its May 26, 1962 issue:

Pete Rugolo’s latest outing for Mercury spotlights the themes from a host of video favorites presented in a highly listenable manner. The orkster uses very effective arrangements to indicate the mood and flavor of the shows they represent and proves that each theme has its own musical merit. . . . There’s enough listening enjoyment here to attract a wide variety of record buyers.

== Track listing ==
1. "Theme from Ben Casey" (David Raksin) – 2:07
2. "Medley: Theme from The Dick Van Dyke Show/Dobie" (Earle Hagen/Lionel Newman, Max Shulman) – 2:14
3. "General Electric Theatre Logo" (Stanley Wilson) – 1:57
4. "87th Precinct" (Morton Stevens) – 2:08
5. "Theme from Route 66" (Nelson Riddle) – 2:43
6. "Medley: Theme from Andy Griffith/My Three Sons" (Earle Hagen, Herbert W. Spencer/Frank De Vol) – 2:10
7. "Medley: The Case of the Dangerous Robin/Theme from The Barbara Stanwyck TV Show" (David Rose/Earle Hagen) – 2:43
8. "Bonanza" (Ray Evans, Jay Livingston) – 1:41
9. "Theme From Dr. Kildare" (Jerry Goldsmith) – 1:34
10. "Ichabod and Me Theme" (Pete Rugolo) – 1:37
11. "Naked City Theme" (Billy May) – 2:27
12. "Nervous (Theme from The Dick Powell Show)" (Richard Shores) – 2:54
- Recorded at United Recording Studios, Hollywood, CA on February 26, 1962 (tracks 1, 4, 10 & 11), February 27, 1962 (tracks 3, 5, 7 & 9), and February 28, 1962 (tracks 2, 5, 6 & 12).

== Personnel ==
- Pete Rugolo – arranger, conductor
- Bones Howe – Engineer
- Unidentified orchestra

== Reissue ==
The album's twelve tracks were included in a compact disc released in 2006 by Gambit Records, an imprint of Andorran label Disconforme SL, titled Pete Rugolo And His Orchestra -- TV Top Themes. The CD also included the ten tracks from Rugolo's 1959 album, Behind Brigitte Bardot.
