= Steve White (saxophonist) =

- Birth name: Stephen Gaylord Goorabian
- Born: November 20, 1925; Fresno, California, U.S.
- Died: December 21, 2005 (aged 80); Burbank, California, U.S.
- Genres: Jazz
- Occupation: Musician
- Instrument(s): Tenor saxophone, baritone saxophone, clarinet

Steve White (born Stephen Gaylord Goorabian, sometimes spelled "Gailord"; November 20, 1925 – December 21, 2005) was an American jazz saxophonist based in Los Angeles who recorded in the 1950s for Nocturne, Pacific Jazz, and Atlantic. He primarily played tenor saxophone, but he also played baritone and clarinet. Steve White was friends with jazz musicians Harry Babasin and Bob Enevoldsen. White's father was a saxophonist and member of the Jimmy Dorsey Band. His father was the first to use the pseudonym "White."

== Discography ==
- Jazz in Hollywood (Nocturne, 1954)
- Jazz Mad: The Unpredictable Steve White (Liberty)
