= The Sweet Ride =

1968 film by Harvey Hart

- Film poster
- Directed by: Harvey Hart
- Screenplay by: Tom Mankiewicz
- Based on: The Sweet Ride (1967 novel) by William Murray
- Produced by: Joe Pasternak
- Starring: Tony Franciosa; Michael Sarrazin; Jacqueline Bisset; Michele Carey; Bob Denver
- Cinematography: Robert B. Hauser
- Edited by: Philip W. Anderson
- Music by: Pete Rugolo
- Production company: 20th Century Fox
- Distributed by: 20th Century Fox
- Release dates: May 22, 1968 (San Francisco); June 12, 1968 (New York City)
- Running time: 110 minutes
- Country: United States
- Language: English
- Budget: $1,935,000
- Box office: $1.5 million (US/ Canada)

The Sweet Ride is a 1968 American drama film directed by Harvey Hart and starring Tony Franciosa, Michael Sarrazin, Jacqueline Bisset, and Bob Denver. The screenplay by Tom Mankiewicz is based on the 1967 novel by William Murray, about the lives of various offbeat characters (including a tennis bum, a surfer, a beatnik, an actress, and a biker) in Malibu, California. The musical score was composed by Pete Rugolo, and features Dusty Springfield and Moby Grape.

The film was released by 20th Century Fox on May 22, 1968. Sarrazin and Bisset were both received Golden Globe nominations for New Star of the Year, for their performances.

== Plot ==
A woman named Vicki Cartwright is found severely beaten along a Malibu highway. Police arrest her boyfriend, surfer Denny McGuire. An unfolding series of flashbacks reveals the nature of their relationship.

Denny lives in a Malibu beach house with Collie Ransom, a middle-aged tennis bum, and Choo-Choo Burns, a beatnik jazz pianist. Their carefree life as bachelors was interrupted by the sudden arrival of Vicki, an aspiring actress. Denny and Vicki began a relationship, but Vicki refused to marry him, being under the control of her possessive producer and lover Brady Caswell. Meanwhile, she took an interest in a outlaw biker nicknamed "Mr. Clean".

Eventually, Denny and Vicki bitterly breakup, and Vicki is found beaten two weeks later. After Denny and Collie are released, they learn that Vicki was savagely beaten by Caswell after she had masochistic sex with Mr. Clean. Denny assaults Caswell at his home, leaving him bleeding and unconscious. He resolves to leave Malibu, and relocates to Santa Monica.

== Cast ==
- Tony Franciosa as Collie Ransom
- Michael Sarrazin as Denny McGuire
- Jacqueline Bisset as Vickie Cartwright
- Bob Denver as Choo-Choo Burns
- Michael Wilding as Mr. Cartwright
- Michele Carey as Thumper Stevens
- Lara Lindsay as Martha
- Norma Crane as Mrs. Cartwright
- Percy Rodriguez as Lt. Harvey Atkins
- Warren Stevens as Brady Caswell
- Charles Dierkop as Mr. Clean
- Pat Buttram as Texan
- Michael Forest as Barry Green
- Lloyd Gough as Parker
- Stacy King as Big Jane
- Corinna Tsopei as Tennis Girl
- Arthur Franz as Psychiatrist
- Seymour Cassel as a surfer (uncredited)

== Production ==
Jacqueline Bisset was cast on the basis of her short appearance in Two for the Road starring Audrey Hepburn and Albert Finney. By the time The Sweet Ride was released, she had been cast in The Detective and Bullitt.

Principal photography began in Malibu on July 17, 1967. Other scenes were shot along the Sunset Strip in West Hollywood, including Gazzarri's.

Tom Mankiewicz also says producer Joe Pasternak had suffered a stroke shortly before filming which impacted his effectiveness.

Bisset said her nude scene in the ocean was 'miserable'.

== Reception ==
According to Fox records, the film required $3,950,000 in rentals to break even and by 11 December 1970 had made $2,600,000 so made a loss.

Tom Mankiewicz later said the problem with the film was "it tried to touch all the bases at once: drama, comedy, porn, dropouts, surfing, true love, a touch of perversion, and the general malaise of 1960s young people. Frankie and Annette it definitely wasn't."

Variety wrote of the film:

The Sweet Ride could sum up as Hell's Angels' Bikini Beach Party in Valley of the Dolls near Peyton Place. Though well-mounted and interesting in the spotlighting of Michael Sarrazin and Jacqueline Bisset, overall result is a flat programmer, with ragged scripting, papier mache characters and routine direction.

=== Accolades ===
Ceremony	Category	Nominee	Result	Ref.
26th Golden Globes	New Star of the Year – Actor	Michael Sarrazin	Nominated	
26th Golden Globes	New Star of the Year – Actress	Jacqueline Bisset	Nominated	

== Soundtrack ==
The Sweet Ride

Soundtrack album by Pete Rugolo
- Released: 1968
- Genre: Jazz
- Labels: 20th Century Fox; 3198/S 4198

Pete Rugolo chronology
TV's Top Themes (1962)	The Sweet Ride (1968)

The score was composed, arranged and conducted by Pete Rugolo except the main title written by Lee Hazlewood and performed by Dusty Springfield with the soundtrack album released on the 20th Century Fox label.

The San Francisco rock and roll band Moby Grape contributed to the soundtrack, and appeared, credited, in the film, performing the song "Never Again" in a Sunset Strip nightclub called the Tarantula.

=== Reception ===
Professional ratings
Review scores
Source	Rating
Allmusic	3/5 stars

The Allmusic review by Tony Wilds noted: "Rugolo hits many of the same areas that made several Lalo Schifrin soundtracks great, but unlike Schifrin, Rugolo lacks the killer pop instinct. It all sounds like soundtrack music (the average cut is only about two minutes long), and there's nothing here that hadn't been done better elsewhere, earlier.".

=== Track listing ===
All compositions by Pete Rugolo except where noted.

1. "Sweet Ride (Main Title)" (Lee Hazlewood) - - 2:02
2. "Vicky Meets Danny"- 2:30
3. "Collier's Riff" - 1:35
4. "Come Bossa With Me" - 1:53
5. "Thumper" - 1:20
6. "My Name Is Mr. Clean" - 2:09
7. "Lost Wages Brash" - 1:50
8. "Turn Me On" - 3:08
9. "Sock Me Choo Choo (Sweet Ride Theme)" (Lee Hazlewood) - 1:50
10. "Bedroom Time" - 3:08
11. "Where's The Melody" - 1:00
12. "Swing Me Lightly" - 2:31

=== Personnel ===
- Pete Rugolo - arranger, conductor
- Dusty Springfield - vocals (track 1)
