= Percussion at Work =

Studio album by Pete Rugolo and His Orchestra
- Released: 1958
- Recorded: November 5 & 15, 1957
- Studio: Capitol (Hollywood)
- Genre: Jazz
- Label: EmArcy; MG 36122

Pete Rugolo chronology
An Adventure in Sound: Brass in Hi-Fi (1956)	Percussion at Work (1958)	Rugolo Plays Kenton (1958)

Percussion at Work is an album by composer, arranger and conductor Pete Rugolo featuring performances recorded in 1957 and first released on the EmArcy label.

== Reception ==
Professional ratings
Review scores
Source	Rating
AllMusic	2.5/5 stars

The AllMusic review by Scott Yanow observed: "Some of arranger Pete Rugolo's Mercury and Emarcy recordings of the late 1950s seemed to concentrate more on getting effects than producing creative jazz. ... the album is primarily for hi-fi freaks and those who love percussion solos."

== Track listing ==
All compositions by Pete Rugolo, except where indicated.

1. "Artistry in Percussion" - 4:06
2. "Fugue for Rhythm Section" - 3:35
3. "1 + 4" - 4:30
4. "Chorale for Brass, Piano, and Bongo" (Rugolo, Stan Kenton) - 3:01
5. "Interplay for Drums, Brass" - 2:32
6. "Funky Drums (André Previn, Larry Bunker, Shelly Manne, Mel Lewis, Rugolo) - 4:05
7. "Drumerama" (Eddie Cano) - 2:59
8. "Bongo Riff" - 3:31
9. "Percussion at Work" - 4:54
- Recorded at Capitol Studios in Los Angeles, CA on November 5, 1957 (tracks 1, 3-5 & 8) and November 15, 1957 (tracks 2, 6, 7 & 9).

== Personnel ==
- Pete Rugolo - arranger, conductor
- Buddy Childers, Don Fagerquist, Ed Leddy, Uan Rasey - trumpet (tracks 1, 3-5 & 8)
- Milt Bernhart, Herbie Harper, Frank Rosolino - trombone (tracks 1, 3-5 & 8)
- Russell Brown - bass trombone (tracks 1, 3-5 & 8)
- John Graas - French horn (tracks 1, 3-5 & 8)
- Clarence Karella - tuba (tracks 1, 3-5 & 8)
- André Previn - piano
- Al Portch - guitar
- Joe Mondragon - bass
- Mel Lewis (tracks 2, 6, 7 & 9), Shelly Manne - drums
- Larry Bunker - vibraphone, xylophone, timpani, drums
- Jack Costanzo - bongos
