= Out on a Limb (album) =

Studio album by Pete Rugolo and His All-Stars
- Released: 1957
- Recorded: July 9, 10 & 11 and October 29, 1956
- Studio: Capitol (Hollywood)
- Genre: Jazz
- Label: EmArcy; MG 36115

Pete Rugolo chronology
Music for Hi-Fi Bugs (1956)	Out on a Limb (1957)	An Adventure in Sound: Reeds in Hi-Fi (1956)

Out on a Limb is an album by composer, arranger and conductor Pete Rugolo featuring performances recorded in 1956 and originally released on the EmArcy label as a 12-inch LP. Tracks from this album were later released in stereo on Music from Out of Space and Rugolo Meets Rhythm.

== Track listing ==
All compositions by Pete Rugolo, except where indicated.

1. "Don't Play the Melody" - 2:35
2. "In a Modal Tone" - 2:53
3. "Early Duke" - 4:12
4. "Nancy" (Jimmy Van Heusen, Phil Silvers) - 2:30
5. "Sunday, Monday or Always" (Van Heusen, Johnny Burke) - 3:30
6. "The Boy Next Door" (Ralph Blane, Hugh Martin) - 4:15
7. "Cha-Lito Linda" - 2:30
8. "Ballade for Drums" - 3:25
9. "Smoke Gets in Your Eyes" (Jerome Kern, Otto Harbach) - 4:07
10. "Repetitious Riff" - 2:38
- Recorded in Los Angeles, CA on July 9, 1956 (track 9), July 10, 1956 (tracks 1 & 6), July 11, 1956 (tracks 2, 3 & 7) and October 29, 1956 (tracks 4, 5, 8 & 10).

== Personnel ==
- Pete Rugolo - arranger, conductor
- Pete Candoli (tracks 1–8 & 10), Don Fagerquist (tracks 2–5, 7, 8 & 10), Maynard Ferguson (tracks 1–8 & 10), Ray Linn (tracks 1–8 & 10), Don Paladino (tracks 1 & 6) - trumpet
- Milt Bernhart, Herbie Harper, Frank Rosolino - trombone (tracks 1–8 & 10)
- George Roberts - bass trombone (tracks 1–8 & 10)
- John Cave, Vincent DeRosa - French horn (tracks 1–8 & 10)
- Clarence Karella (tracks 1–3, 6 & 7), Jay McAllister (tracks 4, 5, 8 & 10) - tuba
- Harry Klee - alto saxophone, alto flute, piccolo
- Ronny Lang (tracks 1–3, 6, 7 & 9) Bud Shank (tracks 4, 5, 8 & 10) - alto saxophone, flute
- Gene Cipriano (tracks 1–3, 6, 7 & 9), Bob Cooper (tracks 4, 5, 8 & 10), Dave Pell - tenor saxophone
- Chuck Gentry (tracks 1–3, 6, 7 & 9), Jimmy Giuffre (tracks 4, 5, 8 & 10) - baritone saxophone
- Russ Freeman - piano
- Barney Kessell (tracks 4, 5, 8 & 10), Howard Roberts (tracks 1–3, 6, 7 & 9) - guitar
- Joe Mondragon - bass
- Shelly Manne - drums
