= An Adventure in Sound: Brass in Hi-Fi =

Studio album by Pete Rugolo and His Orchestra
- Released: 1958
- Recorded: July 10, October 31 and November 21, 1956
- Studio: Capitol (Hollywood)
- Genre: Jazz
- Label: Mercury; MG 20261/SR 60044

Pete Rugolo chronology
An Adventure in Sound: Reeds in Hi-Fi (1956)	An Adventure in Sound: Brass in Hi-Fi (1958)	Percussion at Work (1957)

An Adventure in Sound: Brass in Hi-Fi (also released as An Adventure in Sound - Brass) is an album by composer, arranger and conductor Pete Rugolo featuring performances recorded in 1956 and first released on the Mercury label in 1958.

Professional ratings
Review scores
Source	Rating
AllMusic	2/5 stars

== Track listing ==
All compositions by Pete Rugolo, except where indicated.

1. "My Mother's Eyes" (Abel Baer, L. Wolfe Gilbert) - 4:24
2. "All the Things You Are" (Jerome Kern, Oscar Hammerstein II) - 3:07
3. "Can't We Talk It Over" (Victor Young, Ned Washington) - 4:55
4. "God Child" (George Wallington) - 3:12
5. "Brass at Work" - 3:26
6. "Temptation" (Nacio Herb Brown, Arthur Freed) - 3:05
7. "Song for Tuba" - 3:02
8. "A Rose for David" - 2:35
9. "Everything Happens to Me (Matt Dennis, Tom Adair) - 3:44
10. "Salute" - 3:31
- Recorded a Capitol Studios in Los Angeles, CA on July 10, 1956 (track 3), October 31, 1956 (tracks 1, 2, 4 & 5) and November 21, 1956 (tracks 6–10).

== Personnel ==
- Pete Rugolo - arranger, conductor
- Pete Candoli, Don Fagerquist (tracks 1, 2 & 4–10), Maynard Ferguson, Ray Linn, Don Paladino (track 3) - trumpet
- Milt Bernhart, Herbie Harper, Frank Rosolino - trombone (tracks 1, 2 & 4–10)
- George Roberts - bass trombone (tracks 1, 2 & 4–10)
- John Cave, Vincent DeRosa - French horn (tracks 1, 2 & 4–10)
- Clarence Karella - tuba (tracks 1, 2 & 4–10)
- Russ Freeman (track 3), André Previn (tracks 1, 2, 4 & 5), Claude Williamson (tracks 6–10) - piano
- Barney Kessel (tracks 1, 2 & 4–10), Howard Roberts (track 3) - guitar
- Joe Mondragon - bass
- Shelly Manne - drums
- Larry Bunker - vibraphone, percussion (tracks 1, 2 & 4–10)
