= Ben Oakland =

- Born: September 24, 1907; New York City, New York
- Died: August 26, 1979 (aged 71) Hollywood, California
- Occupation: songwriter

Ben Oakland (September 24, 1907 – August 26, 1979) was an American composer, lyricist, and pianist, most active from the 1920s through the 1940s. He composed mainly for Broadway and vaudeville, though he also worked on several Hollywood scores including the score for the film My Little Chickadee.

Oakland often composed music only, collaborating with lyricists including Oscar Hammerstein II, Bob Russell, Milton Drake, L. Wolfe Gilbert, and Artie Shaw. Notable compositions include "Java Jive", "I'll Take Romance", and "I'm A Hundred Percent For You".

The two songs that Oakland wrote with Oscar Hammerstein II are "I'll Take Romance" and "A Mist Over the Moon." The latter, which was written for a 1938 picture called The Lady Objects won Hammerstein and Oakland an Oscar nomination. The former, which was written for a 1937 film starring Grace Moore, won no awards but is frequently performed. June Christy sang it, to an arrangement by Pete Rugolo, on the 1954 album Something Cool. Another popular version at that time was sung by Eydie Gorme on her LP Sincerely Yours, to an arrangement by Sid Feller.

He collaborated with Artie Shaw and Milton Drake on the love song "If It's You" introduced by Tony Martin in the 1941 Marx Brothers' picture The Big Store.

"If I Love Again," which has a lyric by Jack Murray, was performed by Anita O'Day on the 1960 album Incomparable! and by Barbra Streisand in the 1975 film Funny Lady. It was written for the 1933 musical, Hold Your Horses.

The Songwriter's Hall of Fame lists Oakland on their notable (non-inducted) songwriters list, for contributions to the American popular song.

== Selected filmography ==
- Glamour for Sale (1940)
- The Big Store (1941)
