= An Adventure in Sound: Reeds in Hi-Fi =

Studio album by Pete Rugolo and His Orchestra
- Released: 1958
- Recorded: October 30 and November 1, 1956
- Studio: Capitol (Hollywood)
- Genre: Jazz
- Label: Mercury; MG 20260/SR 60039

Pete Rugolo chronology
| Out on a Limb (1956) | An Adventure in Sound: Reeds in Hi-Fi (1958) | An Adventure in Sound: Brass in Hi-Fi (1956) |

An Adventure in Sound: Reeds in Hi-Fi (also released as An Adventure in Sound - Reeds) is an album by composer, arranger and conductor Pete Rugolo featuring performances recorded in 1956 and first released on the Mercury label in 1958.

== Reception ==
Professional ratings
Review scores
| Source | Rating |
|---|---|
| AllMusic | 2/5 stars |

The AllMusic review by Scott Yanow stated: "Unfortunately, the novelty effects tend to overshadow the creative elements, and despite the complexity of some of the writing, the overall feel is quite lightweight. A bit of a disappointment considering the potential."

== Track listing ==
All compositions by Pete Rugolo, except where indicated.

1. "Igor Beaver" - 1:52
2. "If You Could See Me Now" (Tadd Dameron, Carl Sigman) - 2:11
3. "Yardbird Suite" (Charlie Parker) - 3:07
4. "Impressionism" - 3:11
5. "Walking Shoes" (Gerry Mulligan) - 2:56
6. "Theme for Alto" - 3:10
7. "Our Waltz" (David Rose) - 4:15
8. "Spring Is Here" (Richard Rodgers, Lorenz Hart) - 4:11
9. "Polytonal Blues" - 2:20
10. "Collaboration" (Rugolo, Stan Kenton) - 3:10
11. "Interlude" - 3:32
- Recorded in Los Angeles, CA on October 30, 1956 (tracks 2, 4, 6, 8, 10 & 11) and November 1, 1956 (tracks 1, 3, 5, 7 & 9).

== Personnel ==
- Pete Rugolo - arranger, conductor
- Harry Klee, Bud Shank - alto saxophone, flute
- Bob Cooper - tenor saxophone, oboe
- Dave Pell - tenor saxophone, bass clarinet, English horn
- Chuck Gentry - baritone saxophone
- André Previn - piano
- Barney Kessel - guitar
- Joe Mondragon - bass
- Shelly Manne - drums
- Babe Russin, Leonard Hartman (oboe), Lloyd Hildebrandt (bassoon), Alex Gershunoff (clarinet), Morris Bercov
