= 10 Saxophones and 2 Basses =

Studio album by Pete Rugolo and His Orchestra
- Released: 1962
- Recorded: November 8 & 9, 1961; United Recording Studios, Hollywood, CA
- Genre: Jazz
- Label: Mercury; PPS 2023/PPS 6023
- Producer: David Carroll

Pete Rugolo chronology
Ten Trumpets and 2 Guitars (1961)	10 Saxophones and 2 Basses (1962)	TV's Top Themes (1962)

10 Saxophones and 2 Basses is an album by composer, arranger and conductor Pete Rugolo featuring performances recorded in 1961 and first released on the Mercury label as part of its audiophile Perfect Presence Sound Series.

== Reception ==
Professional ratings
Review scores
Source	Rating
Allmusic	4.5/5 stars

The Allmusic review by arwulf arwulf noted:

... this sax ensemble with rhythm accompaniment comes across marvelously ... The repertoire used here is as wildly and refreshingly diverse as anything Rugolo ever dreamt up ...

— arwulf, arwulf. Ten Saxophones and Two Basses – Review at AllMusic. Retrieved October 6, 2016.

== Track listing ==
1. "Skyliner" (Charlie Barnet) - 3:15
2. "Sophisticated Lady" (Duke Ellington, Mitchell Parish, Irving Mills) - 4:33
3. "How High the Moon" (Morgan Lewis, Nancy Hamilton) - 1:44
4. "Saxophobia" (Rudy Wiedoeft) - 2:02
5. "Holiday for Strings" (David Rose) - 2:43
6. "Reed Rapture" (Stan Kenton) - 2:52
7. "Sometimes I'm Happy" (Vincent Youmans, Irving Caesar) - 3:08
8. "Contrasts" (Jimmy Dorsey) - 3:03
9. "Medley: Four Brothers/Early Autumn" (Jimmy Guiffre/Ralph Burns, Woody Herman, Johnny Mercer) - 3:32
10. "Come Back to Sorrento" (Ernesto De Curtis) - 3:02
11. "Guy Meets Freddie Meets Billy" (Pete Rugolo) - 2:06
12. "Funky Basses" (Rugolo) - 2:03
- Recorded at United Recording Studios, Hollywood, CA on November 8, 1961 (tracks 1–4, 6, 7, 9 & 11), and November 9, 1961 (tracks 5, 8, 10 & 12).

== Personnel ==
- Pete Rugolo - arranger, conductor
- Russ Cheever - soprano saxophone, C melody saxophone (tracks 1–11)
- Gus Bivona, Skeets Herfurt, Bud Shank - alto saxophone (tracks 1–11)
- Gene Cipriano, Bob Cooper, Plas Johnson - tenor saxophone (tracks 1–11)
- Bill Perkins - tenor saxophone, baritone saxophone (tracks 1–11)
- Chuck Gentry, Bill Hood - baritone saxophone, bass saxophone (tracks 1–11)
- Jimmy Rowles - piano
- Howard Roberts - guitar, banjo
- Red Mitchell, Joe Mondragon - bass
- Shelly Manne - drums
