= Alan C. Fox =

Alan Fox
- Born: June 30, 1944 (age 82)
- Occupations: Author, philanthropist, entrepreneur
- Website: www.peopletoolsbook.com

Alan C. Fox (born June 30, 1944) is a New York Times-bestselling author, and founder of the Rattle Poetry Journal. He is also president and founder of ACF Property Management, a commercial real estate company based in Studio City, California, and an active philanthropist.

== Writing ==
Fox has an MFA in professional writing from the University of Southern California and has written two books: People Tools: 54 Strategies for Building Relationships, Creating Joy, and Embracing Prosperity, which made both The New York Times Best Seller list and the Publishers Weekly Bestseller list in February, 2014. and the sequel, People Tools for Business: 50 Strategies for Building Success, Creating Wealth, and Finding Happiness, published in September 2014, made the Los Angeles Times Bestseller List.

Fox is also editor-in-chief of the Rattle Poetry Journal, a nationally recognized publication based in Los Angeles. Rattle has featured the work of Philip Levine, Jane Hirshfield, Billy Collins, Sharon Olds, Gregory Orr, Patricia Smith, Anis Mojgani, as well as many new and emerging poets, and hosts an annual poetry competition.

== Philanthropy ==
In 1999, Fox co-founded the Freida C. Fox Family Foundation, which provides grants, consulting, and project based technical assistance for youth and education focused initiatives. In 2011, Fox and the Foundation established the Youth Philanthropy Connect National Convention, which is held annually to encourage children and teenagers to become active in helping others. In 2015, Fox donated $20 million to the University of Arizona School of Music in honor of his father Fred Fox, a well-known French horn player. Fox also made a surprise $200,000 donation to the Steve and Marjorie Harvey Foundation, announced on-air during a January 16, 2015 appearance on The Steve Harvey Show.

Fox serves on the board of directors of a number of nonprofit organizations, including The Center for the Healing Arts, Bright Prospect, and The International Trauma Institute, and has also been a political fundraiser.
