= Rugolomania =

Studio album by Pete Rugolo and His Orchestra with the Rugolettes
- Released: 1955
- Recorded: May 10 and October 11, 1954 and February 11, 1955; Los Angeles, CA and New York City
- Genre: Jazz
- Label: Columbia; CL 689
- Producer: Paul Weston

Pete Rugolo chronology
Adventures in Rhythm (1955)	Rugolomania (1955)	New Sounds by Pete Rugolo (1955)

Rugolomania is an album by composer, arranger and conductor Pete Rugolo, featuring performances recorded in 1954 and 1955 and released on the Columbia label.

== Reception ==
Professional ratings
Review scores
Source	Rating
AllMusic	4.5/5 stars

The AllMusic review by Scott Yanow noted: "The third of three Pete Rugolo Columbia LPs has some of the finest and most interesting work of the arranger's career. ... Brilliant and highly original music."

== Track listing ==
All compositions by Pete Rugolo, except where indicated.

1. "Gone with the Wind" (Allie Wrubel, Herb Magidson) – 2:36
2. "In a Sentimental Mood" (Duke Ellington, Manny Kurtz, Irving Mills) – 3:28
3. "Bobbin' with Bob" – 2:53
4. "4:20 A. M." (David Rose) – 2:36
5. "Little White Lies" (Walter Donaldson) – 3:15
6. "Me Next!" – 3:00
7. "Bongo Dance" (Traditional) – 3:21
8. "Intermezzo (A Love Story)" (Heinz Provost) – 3:48
9. "Montevideo" (Hal Schaefer) – 2:58
10. "I've Had My Moments" (Donaldson, Gus Kahn) – 2:51
11. "Everything I Have Is Yours" (Burton Lane, Harold Adamson) – 3:07
12. "Hornorama" (Julius Watkins) – 3:25
- Recorded in Los Angeles, CA on May 10, 1954 (track 4), in New York City on November 11, 1955 (tracks 1, 11 & 12) and in Los Angeles, CA on February 11, 1955 (tracks 2, 3 & 5–10).

== Personnel ==
- Pete Rugolo – arranger, conductor
- Pete Candoli (track 4), Buddy Childers (tracks 3, 5 & 7), Larry Fain (tracks 1, 11 & 12), Maynard Ferguson (tracks 3–5 & 7), Conrad Gozzo (track 4) Leon Meriam (tracks 1, 11 & 12), Doug Mettome (tracks 1, 11 & 12), Uan Rasey (tracks 3, 5 & 7), Shorty Rogers (track 3–5 & 7), John Wilson (tracks 1, 11 & 12) – trumpet
- Milt Bernhart (tracks 2–10), Eddie Bert (tracks 1, 11 & 12), Harry Betts (tracks 3–5 & 7), Bob Fitzpatrick (tracks 3, 5 & 7), Milt Gold (tracks 1, 11 & 12), John Halliburton (track 4), Herbie Harper (tracks 3, 5 & 7), Frank Rehak (tracks 1, 11 & 12), Kai Winding (tracks 1, 11 & 12) – trombone
- George Roberts – bass trombone (track 4)
- John Cave (track 4), Vincent DeRosa (tracks 3, 5 & 7), John Graas (tracks 2–10), Sinclair Loot (track 4), Stan Paley (tracks 1, 11 & 12), Julius Watkins (tracks 1, 11 & 12) – French horn
- Bill Barber (tracks 1, 11 & 12), Paul Sarmento (tracks 2–10) – tuba
- Bud Shank – alto saxophone, alto flute (tracks 2–10)
- Chase Dean (tracks 1, 11 & 12), Harry Klee (tracks 3–5 & 7), Dave Schildkraut (tracks 1, 11 & 12) – alto saxophone
- Bob Cooper – tenor saxophone, oboe (tracks 2–10)
- Jimmy Giuffre (tracks 3–5 & 7), Joe Megro (tracks 1, 11 & 12) – tenor saxophone, baritone saxophone
- Herbie Mann (tracks 1, 11 & 12) – flute, tenor saxophone
- Bob Gordon (tracks 3–5 & 7), Marty Flax (tracks 1, 11 & 12) – baritone saxophone
- Gordon ell (tracks 1, 11 & 12), Russ Freeman (tracks 3, 5 & 7), Claude Williamson (track 4) – piano
- Perry Lopez (tracks 1, 11 & 12). Howard Roberts (tracks 2–10) – guitar
- Harry Babasin (track 2–10), Whitey Mitchell (tracks 1, 11 & 12) – bass
- Shelly Manne – drums (tracks 2–10)
- Jack Costanzo (track 7) – bongos
- Bernie Mattison (tracks 3–5 & 7), Teddy Sommer (tracks 1, 11 & 12), Jerry Segal (tracks 1, 11 & 12) – percussion
