= Don Fagerquist =

American jazz trumpeter

- Born: Donald Alton Fagerquist; February 6, 1927; Worcester, Massachusetts, U.S.
- Died: January 23, 1974 (aged 46) Canoga Park, California, U.S.
- Genres: Jazz
- Occupation: Musician
- Instrument: Trumpet
- Years active: 1940–1966

Donald Alton Fagerquist (February 6, 1927 – January 23, 1974) was a small group, big band, and studio jazz trumpet player from the West Coast of the United States.

== Career ==
Fagerquist was a featured soloist with several major bands, including Mal Hallett (1943), Gene Krupa (1944–50), Artie Shaw (1949–50), Artie Shaw's Gramercy Five (1949–50), Woody Herman (1951–52), Les Brown (1953), and the Dave Pell Octet (1953–59). He played on the Ella Fitzgerald Sings the Jerome Kern Songbook album (1963) under the baton of Nelson Riddle.

Despite high demand for his services as a lyrical soloist, he recorded only twice as a leader: a half-date for Capitol in 1955 (reissued as part of the Dave Pell Octet CD I Had the Craziest Dream) and a complete project for Mode in 1957 (Music to Fill a Void).

In 1956, Fagerquist signed on as a staff musician for Paramount Films, while still periodically recording with artists such as Shelly Manne, Mel Tormé, and Art Pepper. Throughout the early- to mid-1960s, Fagerquist's solos could be heard on the recordings of Pete Rugolo, Frank Comstock, Nelson Riddle, Billy May, Paul Weston, Si Zentner, Dean Martin and many others.

By 1966, health issues forced Fagerquist to withdraw from studio recording altogether. He died from kidney disease at his home in Canoga Park, California, at the age of 46.

== Selected discography ==
With Chet Baker and Bud Shank

- Theme Music from "The James Dean Story" (World Pacific, 1956)

With Louis Bellson

- Louis Bellson Swings Jule Styne (Verve, 1960)

With Hoagy Carmichael

- Hoagy Sings Carmichael (Pacific Jazz, 1956)

With Bob Cooper

- Coop! The Music of Bob Cooper (Contemporary, 1958)

With Fred Katz

- Folk Songs for Far Out Folk (Warner Bros., 1958)
- Fred Katz and his Jammers (Decca, 1959)

With Stan Kenton

- The Ballad Style of Stan Kenton (Capitol, 1958)

With Junior Mance

- Get Ready, Set, Jump!!! (Capitol, 1964)
- Straight Ahead! (Capitol, 1964)

With Dave Pell

- Dave Pell Octet Plays Irving Berlin (Kapp, 1954)
- Dave Pell Octet Plays Rodgers & Hart (Kapp, 1954)
- Jazz & Romantic Places (Atlantic, 1955)
- Jazz Goes Dancing (RCA, 1956)
- I Had the Craziest Dream (Capitol Records, 1957)

With Shorty Rogers

- Martians Come Back! (Atlantic, 1955 [1956])
- Way Up There (Atlantic, 1955 [1957])
- Portrait of Shorty (RCA Victor, 1957)
- Afro-Cuban Influence (RCA Victor, 1958)
- Chances Are It Swings (RCA Victor, 1958)
- The Wizard of Oz and Other Harold Arlen Songs (RCA Victor, 1959)
- Shorty Rogers Meets Tarzan (MGM, 1960)

With Pete Rugolo

- Music for Hi-Fi Bugs (EmArcy, 1956)
- Out on a Limb (EmArcy, 1956)
- An Adventure in Sound: Brass in Hi-Fi (Mercury 1956 [1958])
- Percussion at Work (EmArcy, 1957)
- Rugolo Plays Kenton (EmArcy, 1958)
- The Music from Richard Diamond (EmArcy, 1959)
- The Original Music of Thriller (Time, 1961)
- Ten Trumpets and 2 Guitars (Mercury, 1961)

With Mel Torme

- Mel Torme Sings Fred Astaire (Bethlehem, 1956)
- Mel Torme with the Marty Paich dek-tette (Bethlehem, 1956)
- California Suite (Bethlehem, 1957)

With the Benny Goodman Orchestra & Brussels World's Fair Orchestra

- Salute to Benny Goodman (Crown, 1958)

With Skip Martin's Scheherajazz

- A Symphony in Jazz by the Video All-Stars (Stereo-Fidelity, 1959)
