= Ray Linn =

American jazz musician

Ray Linn (October 20, 1920 in Chicago, Illinois – 4 November 1996 in Columbus, Ohio) was an American jazz trumpeter.

Linn's first major engagements came in the late 1930s, playing with Tommy Dorsey (1938–41) and Woody Herman (1941-42). He would return to play with Herman again several times, in 1945, 1947, and 1955–59. In the 1940s he spent time with Jimmy Dorsey (1942–45), Benny Goodman (1943, 1947), Artie Shaw (1944–46), and Boyd Raeburn (1946). He moved to Los Angeles in 1945, where he worked extensively as a studio musician, in addition to playing with Bob Crosby (1950–51) and his extended final tenure with Herman. He spent much of the 1960s playing music for television, including The Lawrence Welk Show.

Linn recorded eight tunes as a leader in 1946, and full-length albums in 1978 and 1980, the latter of which are Dixieland jazz efforts.

== Discography ==
=== As leader ===
- Chicago Jazz (Trend, 1978)
- Empty Suit Blues (Discovery, 1980)

=== As sideman ===
With Georgie Auld

- In the Land of Hi-Fi with Georgie Auld and His Orchestra (EmArcy, 1955)

With Chet Baker and Bud Shank

- Theme Music from "The James Dean Story" (World Pacific, 1956)

With Louis Bellson

- Skin Deep (Norgran, 1953)

With Elmer Bernstein

- "The Man with the Golden Arm" (Decca, 1956)

With Buddy Bregman

- Swinging Kicks (Verve, 1957)

With Hoagy Carmichael

- Hoagy Sings Carmichael (Pacific Jazz, 1956)

With Maynard Ferguson

- Around the Horn with Maynard Ferguson (EmArcy, 1956)

With Barney Kessel

- Carmen (Contemporary, 1959)

With Pete Rugolo

- Music for Hi-Fi Bugs (EmArcy, 1956)
- Out on a Limb (EmArcy, 1956)
- An Adventure in Sound: Brass in Hi-Fi (Mercury 1956 [1958])
- The Music from Richard Diamond (EmArcy, 1959)
