= Skip Martin =

American jazz saxophonist (1916–1976)

- Born: Lloyd Vernon Martin; May 14, 1916; Robinson, Illinois, U.S.
- Died: February 12, 1976 (aged 59) Los Angeles, California, U.S.
- Genres: Jazz; swing
- Occupations: Musician; arranger
- Instruments: Saxophone; clarinet
- Years active: 1930s–1960s

Lloyd Vernon "Skip" Martin (May 14, 1916 – February 12, 1976) was an American jazz saxophonist, clarinetist, and arranger.

== Biography ==
Born in Robinson, Illinois, in 1916, Martin was active principally as an arranger for some of the most popular swing jazz bands of the 1930s and 1940s. He worked with Count Basie, Charlie Barnet (1939–40), Benny Goodman (1941), and Glenn Miller (1941–42), doubling as a reedist with the last three. In the Goodman orchestra, he played alto saxophone alongside Gus Bivona and also recorded with the legendary trumpeter Cootie Williams in the early 1940s.

Later in the decade, he worked with Les Brown (memorably, the big-band chart "I've Got My Love to Keep Me Warm"), then moved to Los Angeles in the 1950s, where worked extensively as a staff and freelance orchestrator, studio conductor (e.g. Fred Astaire's Royal Wedding, 1951) and popular song arranger (often for Tony Martin, The Pied Pipers, the Andrews and De Castro sister groups, or Barbara Ruick).

Martin also recorded three albums as a leader and produced material for West Coast jazz and swing concept albums (such as 1959's Scheherajazz with Gus Bivona) for Somerset Records. In 1963, he joined Nelson Riddle on a dream team of arrangers working on the Frank Sinatra–Sonny Burke compilation albums for the ambitious Reprise Musical Repertory Theatre project, featuring the singing members of the Rat Pack, plus Bing Crosby, Rosemary Clooney, and Jo Stafford.

In Hollywood, Martin was one of the team of orchestrators contributing to Singin' in the Rain (1952) and Guys and Dolls (1955). He frequently shared arrangement credits with Conrad Salinger, such as on Summer Stock (1950), Kiss Me Kate (1953) and Funny Face (1957). He was the sole credited orchestrator for Judy Garland's comeback vehicle A Star Is Born (1954), which features many arrangements by him of Harold Arlen and Ira Gershwin ballads, principally "The Man That Got Away" and "It's a New World".

Martin died in Los Angeles, aged 59.
