= Harry Babasin =

American bassist (1921–1988)

Yervant Harry Babasin, Jr. (19 March 1921 – 21 May 1988) was an American jazz bassist. His nickname was "The Bear".

== Biography ==
Babasin was born in Dallas, Texas to an American mother and an Armenian father. He attended North Texas State University, one of many noted jazz alumni from the school. Among them were Jimmy Giuffre, with whom Babasin played in Bill Ware's orchestra around 1940, and Herb Ellis, who played with Babasin in the Charlie Fisk Orchestra starting in 1942. Fisk actually fired his rhythm section after hearing Ellis and Babasin play, and after he was admitted, Babasin quit school to go on tour with Fisk. He also toured in the 1940s with Jimmy Joy, Bob Strong, Billie Rogers, Gene Krupa, Charlie Barnet, Boyd Raeburn, Benny Goodman, Woody Herman, Frank DeVol, and Jerry Gray. He also appeared in A Song Is Born, one of many jazz stars to play roles in the film. On the set of the film, he met Brazilian guitarist Laurindo Almeida, and the two began jamming together; along with Roy Harte and Bud Shank, their quartet was an early experiment blending Brazilian music and jazz. Their 1954 10" discs are predecessors to the bossa nova explosion of the late 1950s and early 1960s. In 1947, he recorded the first cello solos known in jazz music, with the Dodo Marmarosa Trio. In order to do so, he tuned his strings in fourths. In later cello ensembles he added a bass player. He and Oscar Pettiford did a session together with two cellos. In the mid-1950s, he put together his own ensemble, Harry Babasin & the Jazzpickers, who played regularly at the Purple Onion in Hollywood; this ensemble released three albums. One recording of note was made in 1952 at the Tradewinds nightclub in Inglewood. It features Charlie Parker, Chet Baker, Sonny Criss, Al Haig, Larance Marable, and Harry, in one of Bird's few West Coast appearances.

His career cooled in the 1960s, returning to work with Charlie Barnet and supporting Bob Hope on USO tours. In the 1970s he and Harte initiated the Los Angeles Theaseum, a jazz archive and preservation society. Some of the recordings preserved through this effort were released on the Jazz Chronicles label.

Babasin's last tour was given in 1985 with John Banister on piano. Babasin died of emphysema in Los Angeles three years later, having participated in possibly as many as 1,500 recordings.

== Discography ==
- Jazz in Hollywood: Harry Babasin Quintet (Nocturne, 1954)
- Harry Babasin and the Jazz Pickers (Mode, 1957)
- Command Performance (EmArcy, 1957)
- The Jazzpickers (For Moderns Only) (EmArcy, 1957)

With Laurindo Almeida

- Laurindo Almeida Quartet Featuring Bud Shank (Pacific Jazz, 1953–54)

With Barney Kessel

- Easy Like (Contemporary, 1953)

With Charlie Parker and Chet Baker

- Inglewood Jam (Jazz Chronicles, Fresh Sound, 1952)

With Pete Rugolo

- Introducing Pete Rugolo (Columbia, 1954)
- Adventures in Rhythm (Columbia, 1954)
- Rugolomania (Columbia, 1955)
- New Sounds by Pete Rugolo (Harmony, 1954–55, [1957])

With Bud Shank

- Bud Shank - Shorty Rogers - Bill Perkins (Pacific Jazz, 1955)

== See also ==
- Nocturne Records, co-founded by Babasin in 1954
