= Ruth Olay =

American jazz singer (1924–2021)

Ruth Olay (July 1, 1924 – September 3, 2021) was an American jazz singer who was born in San Francisco, the daughter of a Rabbi and a professional chorister mother. Moving to Los Angeles while still an infant, Olay became a fixture in Hollywood's nightclub scene in the late 1940s and through the 1950s and early 1960s.

== Career ==
Ruth Lissauer was born in San Francisco, California to Herman And Nina Weiss Lissauer on July 1, 1924. Initially a piano prodigy, her interest in music developed from exposure to her mother's professional chorus singing work. At age 16 or 17, working as secretary at Twentieth Century Fox, Ruth undertook singing lessons with vocal coach Florence Russell (Dorothy Dandridge). While at work, she met one of Duke Ellington's vocalists, Ivie Anderson. Together they attended the venue where Ellington was playing and Ruth was persuaded to sing. In 1942, at her mother's remarriage party she sang and impressed a guest, the wife of songwriter Irving Gordon (Throw Mama From the Train, Unforgettable). Gordon in turn introduced Ruth to jazz musician Benny Carter who became her musical mentor.

She performed under the moniker Rachel Davis and, due to her dark complexion, passing as a black woman, with Carter in San Diego, and later with Jerry Fielding in Los Angeles and Beverly Hills clubs, all the while holding down a secretarial day job at Twentieth Century Fox, including work for celebrated screenwriter Preston Sturges. At the Cabaret Concert Theatre where she both waitressed and sang, she came to the attention of Bill Hitchcock of Zephyr Records. Ruth's first LP on Zephyr in 1956 was promoted as coming from "the blues shouting tradition", "pop style" and "swinging interpretation".

While gigging at the Little Club, Ruth was approached by Bill Burton, who managed, among others, Jimmy Dorsey and Dick Haymes, and soon got her big break when Burton booked her an emergency gig at the Avant Garde Club in replacement of Billie Holiday, who had fallen ill. This developed into a headline run, along with Shelley Berman, Matt Dennis Trio and Lenny Bruce. A regular at the club was arranger Pete Rugolo, who A&R'ed for Mercury Records.

Her first LP on Mercury OLAY! The New Sound of Ruth Olay in 1958 was followed by a guest vocalist spot on Jack Paar's Tonight Show. She became the "Singing Sensation of the Jack Paar Show" during Paar's stint, and also appeared later on Johnny Carson's watch, the latter time backed by Duke Ellington. Subsequent appearances included Jerry Fielding's TV show, and with Merv Griffin, Jackie Gleason and Steve Allen. In 1961, Olay found time to play the role of Julie in Lewis & Young's production of Show Boat.

For the second LP Easy Living on Mercury in 1959, Olay was set up with Jerry Fielding whose credits included arranging with big bands such as those of Kay Kyser, Claude Thornhill, Jimmie Lunceford, Tommy Dorsey, Charlie Barnet, and Les Brown. LP's followed on diverse labels after Olay's departure from Mercury and she continued nightclub appearances and TV shows well into the 1960s (e.g.: Sue Rainey on KTLA June 11, 1965). After spending some time performing in Europe where the popularity of American jazz persisted Olay returned to the US and gradually phased into retirement and withdrew from singing altogether.

Olay died on September 3, 2021, in Los Angeles, California, aged 97.

== Personal life ==
Olay's parents divorced when she was six, her father going on to become the Head of Research at Warner Bros. Ruth was married three times, firstly to Lionel Olay from 1947 to 1949, and whose name she adopted as her stage name. They had a daughter, Amy, born in 1949, and there is a son from a subsequent marriage. Her second divorce was in 1961. In 1963 she married her manager Lee Magid, and together they had a son, Adam.

== Recordings ==
- 1956 - It's About Time; Zephyr 12004 LP
- 1956 - "Good Love" / "Cotton Pickin' Moon"; Zephyr ZR 70002 single
- 1958 - OLAY! The New Sound of Ruth Olay; Mercury MG 36125 LP
- 1959 - Easy Living; Mercury MG 20390 LP
- 1959 - "I Wanna Be a Friend of Yours" / "On Behalf of the Visiting Firemen"; Mercury 71453 (78 rpm) 71432X45 (45 rpm) single
- 1959 - Never Do / I Wanna Be a Friend of Yours; Mercury DJ43 45 rpm single promo
- 1960 - In Person Recorded Live at Mr. Kelly's; United Artists UAL 3115(M) UAL 6115 (S) LP
- 1963 - OLAY! O.K.!!; Everest 5218 (M) 1218 (S) LP
- 1963 - Gonna Build a Mountain / Scarlet Bird; Everest 2037 45 rpm single
- 1966 - God Bless The Child / I Ain't Got Nothin' But The Blues; ABC 10870 45 rpm single
- 1966 - Soul In The Night; ABC 573 LP
- 1979 - Jazz at the Ojai Festivals Bowl - Ray Leatherwood (drums) Eddie Miller (sax) & Ruth Olay (vocals); Townhall Records 527
- 1982 - Ruth Olay Sings Jazz Today; Laurel Records LR-8501 LP
- 1982 - Watch What Happens - Ruth Olay & Her Friends; Laurel Records LR-8502 LP
