= Conrad Gozzo =

American trumpet player (1922–1964)

- Born: February 6, 1922; New Britain, Connecticut, U.S.
- Died: October 8, 1964 (aged 42) Burbank, California, U.S.
- Instrument: Trumpet
- Years active: 1938–1964

Conrad Joseph Gozzo (February 6, 1922 – October 8, 1964) was an American trumpet player. He was a member of the NBC Hollywood staff orchestra at the time of his death.

== Early life ==
Gozzo was born in New Britain, Connecticut on February 6, 1922, to Mildred Katz and Jimmy Gozzo. Son of Sicilian parents from Canicattini Bagni (SR). His father played trumpet, and Gozzo began learning the instrument around the age of 5. He played in his junior and senior high school bands, but left school in 1938 or 1939 (Note: Many sources state that Gozzo left in 1938, but Harold S. Kaye suggests February 1939, noting discrepancies such as a postcard from Gozzo marked for March 21 stating "it took several weeks for me to get settled" and The New Britain Herald's stating on March 11, 1939, that Gozzo "recently" joined Jones.) at the recommendation of Isham Jones to join bandleader and clarinetist Tommy Reynolds in Boston, Massachusetts.

== Career ==
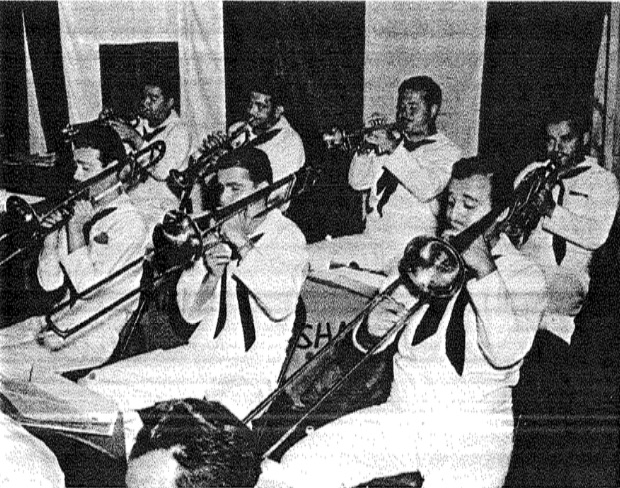
Shaw's band on January 30, 1943. Gozzo is the third trumpet from the left.

Gozzo was quickly noted for his exceptional technical ability and style. He played under Reynolds for nine months, leaving to play with Red Norvo in November 1939; he played under Norvo until February 1941, but with a brief interlude playing with trumpeter Johnnie Davis. He had a brief tenure with the orchestra of Bob Chester, with whom he first recorded; then performed and recorded with Claude Thornhill's band. There he met vocalist Betty Claire, who he married in late 1941. Thornhill's band dissolved in October 1942.

Gozzo briefly worked with Benny Goodman, then enlisted in the U.S. Navy in mid-November 1942, where clarinetist Artie Shaw had formed a band, the Rangers No. 501. They were first assigned to San Francisco and left for Hawaii in late December. They toured in the South Pacific, the U.K. and the mainland U.S. until being discharged in October 1945. Gozzo briefly rejoined Goodman along with fellow trumpet players from Shaw's band.

Gozzo, lead trumpeter on the Glen Gray, Stan Kenton, and Harry James "remakes", and in Dan Terry's 1954 Columbia sessions, recorded extensively with arrangers Van Alexander, Nelson Riddle, Billy May, Ray Conniff, Jerry Fielding and Shorty Rogers, and also with performers Dean Martin and Frank Sinatra. He played first trumpet on all of the recordings of composer Henry Mancini. He performed on many major live television shows broadcast on the NBC network, including the Dinah Shore Show (1955 through 1964). He also performed on motion picture soundtracks including The Glenn Miller Story, The Benny Goodman Story, Bye Bye Birdie, Call Me Madam, Ben-Hur and Cleopatra. He played on the Ella Fitzgerald two-record set on Verve, Ella Fitzgerald Sings the Harold Arlen Songbook.

Gozzo's nicknames were "Goz" and "Gopher", due to his resemblance to a gopher when viewed from the front while he was playing. He was considered by his colleagues as being an exceptionally strong trumpeter with a well-developed range and tonal quality. For most of his recording career, he played a Besson Meha trumpet with a custom Bert Herrick mouthpiece. Occasionally, he played a Chicago Benge or a LeBlanc Gozzo model trumpet.

In March 1955, Gozzo released his own album, Goz the Great!, signed with RCA Victor and played by "Conrad Gozzo and his Orchestra", directed by Billy May. Three of the twelve tracks were written together by Gozzo and May. The album was not particularly successful and was reviewed as mediocre.

== Death and legacy ==
Gozzo died on October 8, 1964, of liver disease at Providence Saint Joseph Medical Center in Burbank, California. On November 15, 1964, a fundraising concert for his widow was held at the Hollywood Palladium, featuring singers Frank Sinatra, Peggy Lee and Dinah Shore.

"A Trumpeter's Prayer" (1957) by Tutti Camarata originally featured Gozzo, and was performed on November 19, 1989, in New Britain for the 25th anniversary of his death. Jazz composer Sammy Nestico dedicated "Portrait of a Trumpet" to Gozzo.

== Discography ==
With Georgie Auld

- In the Land of Hi-Fi with Georgie Auld and His Orchestra (EmArcy, 1955)

With Louis Bellson

- Skin Deep (Norgran, 1953)

With Buddy Bregman

- Swinging Kicks (Verve, 1957)

With Ray Brown

- Bass Hit! (Verve, 1957)

With Hoagy Carmichael

- Hoagy Sings Carmichael (Pacific Jazz, 1956)

With Benny Carter

- Aspects (United Artists, 1959)

With Sammy Davis Jr

- It's All Over but the Swingin' (Decca, 1957)

With Henry Mancini

- The Music from Peter Gunn (RCA Victor, 1959)
- More Music from Peter Gunn (RCA Victor, 1959)
- The Blues and the Beat (RCA Victor, 1960)
- Music from Mr. Lucky (RCA Victor, 1960)
- Uniquely Mancini (RCA Victor, 1963)

With Shorty Rogers

- Cool and Crazy (RCA Victor, 1953)
- Shorty Rogers Courts the Count (RCA Victor, 1954)
- Portrait of Shorty (RCA Victor, 1957)

With Pete Rugolo

- Introducing Pete Rugolo (Columbia, 1954)
- Adventures in Rhythm (Columbia, 1954)
- Rugolomania (Columbia, 1955)
- New Sounds by Pete Rugolo (Harmony, 1954–55, [1957])

== Bibliography ==
- Kaye, Harold S. (Spring 1992a). "The Great 'Goz' – Part 1". IAJRC Journal. 25 (2): 1–5. ISSN 0098-9487.
- —— (Summer 1992b). "The Great 'Goz': The Conrad Gozzo Story – Part 2". IAJRC Journal. 25 (3): 14–20. ISSN 0098-9487.
- —— (Fall 1992c). "The Great 'Goz': The Conrad Gozzo Story – Part 3". IAJRC Journal. 25 (4): 16–23. ISSN 0098-9487.
- —— (Winter 1993a). "The Great 'Goz': The Conrad Gozzo Story – Part 4". IAJRC Journal. 26 (1): 29–36. ISSN 0098-9487.
- —— (Spring 1993b). "The Great 'Goz': The Conrad Gozzo Story – Part 5". IAJRC Journal. 26 (2): 54–62. ISSN 0098-9487.
