= Pete Rugolo =

American jazz composer, arranger, and record producer (1915–2011)

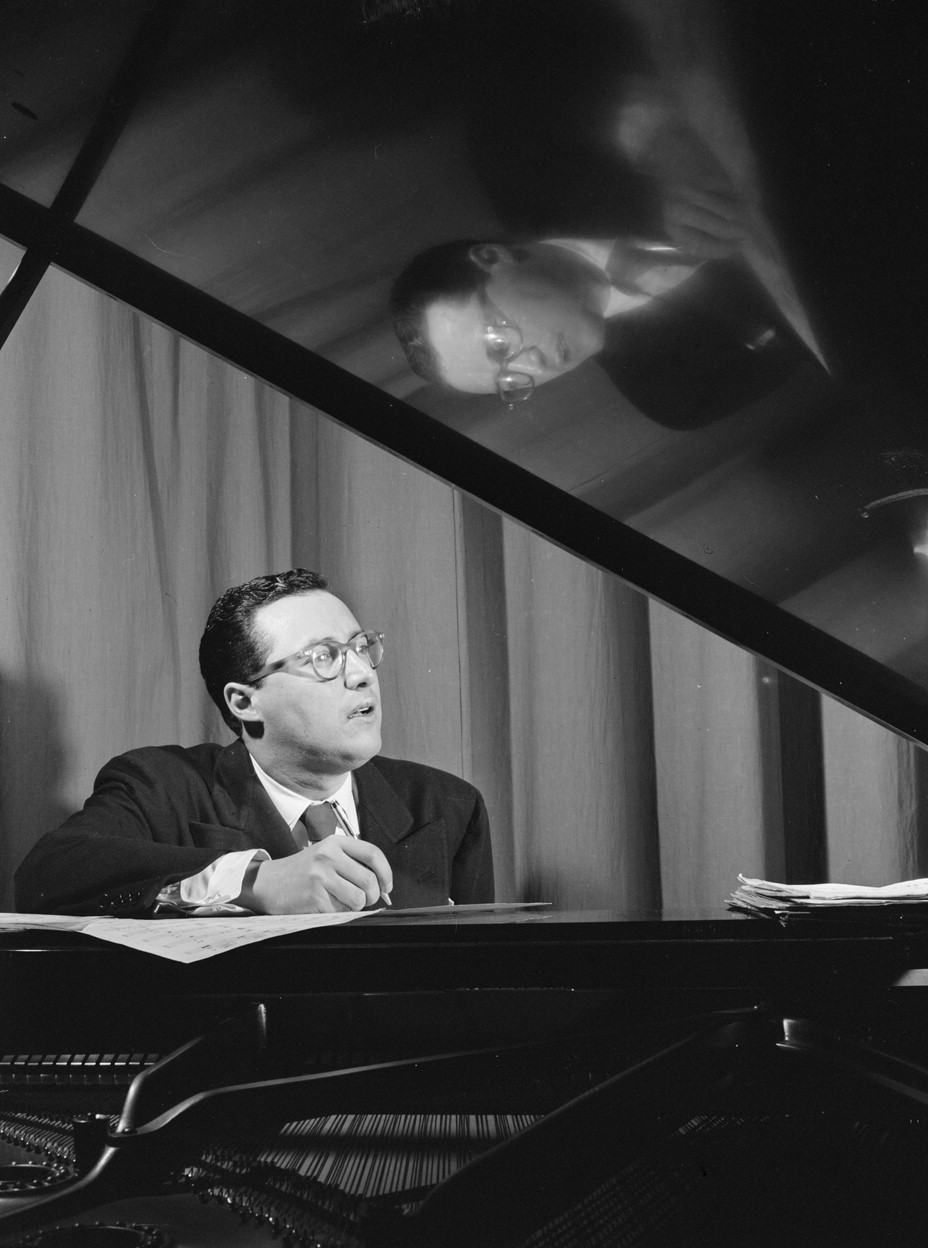
- Pete Rugolo, c. December 1946, photograph by William P. Gottlieb

Background information
- Born: Pietro Rugolo; December 25, 1915; San Piero Patti, Sicily, Kingdom of Italy
- Died: October 16, 2011 (aged 95) Los Angeles, California, U.S.
- Genres: Jazz, crime jazz
- Occupations: Composer; arranger; producer
- Years active: 1940s–1990s

Pietro Rugolo (December 25, 1915 – October 16, 2011), known professionally as Pete Rugolo, was an American jazz composer, arranger, and record producer.

== Early life and education ==
Rugolo was born in San Piero Patti, Sicily. His family emigrated to the United States in 1920; he grew up in Santa Rosa, California, where his father earned a living as a shoemaker. He began his career in music playing the baritone horn, like his father, but he quickly branched out into other instruments, notably the French horn and the piano. He received a bachelor's degree from San Francisco State College and then went on to study composition with Darius Milhaud at Mills College in Oakland, California, where he earned a master's degree.

After he graduated, Rugolo was hired as an arranger and composer by guitarist and bandleader Johnny Richards.

== 1940s and 1950s ==
Rugulo spent World War II playing with altoist Paul Desmond in an Army band (1942-1945). After the war, Rugolo worked for Stan Kenton. He and songwriter Joe Greene collaborated on songs that made Kenton's band one of America's most popular.

While Rugolo continued to work occasionally with Kenton in the 1950s, he spent more time creating arrangements for pop and jazz vocalists, most extensively with former Kenton singer June Christy on such albums as Something Cool, The Misty Miss Christy, Fair and Warmer!, Gone for the Day, The Song Is June!, Off-Beat and This Time of Year .

During this period, he worked on film musicals at Metro-Goldwyn-Mayer, and in the late 1950s he served as an A&R director for Capitol Records. Among his albums were Adventures in Rhythm, Introducing Pete Rugolo, Rugolomania, An Adventure in Sound: Reeds in Hi-Fi, and Music for Hi-Fi Bugs. Rugolo's arrangements for the album The Four Freshmen and Five Trombones propelled the group to recognition in jazz circles. It was their bestselling album.

== Television and film scoring ==
In the 1960s and 1970s, Rugolo did a great deal of work in television, contributing music to a number of series including Leave It to Beaver, Thriller, The Investigators, The Thin Man, Checkmate, The Fugitive, Run for Your Life, Felony Squad, The Bold Ones: The Lawyers, Alias Smith and Jones, and Family. For The Fugitive, he wrote 90 minutes of music - "every possible kind of suspense, ... a few love themes ... a lot of chases", Rugolo said.

He provided scores for a number of TV movies and a few theatrical films, such as Jack the Ripper (1959), The Sweet Ride (1968), Underground Aces (1981), and Chu Chu and the Philly Flash (1981).

In 1962, he released an album of themes from popular television series, TV's Top Themes, which included his composition for the 1961 CBS sitcom Ichabod and Me. Rugolo's small combo jazz music featured in a couple of numbers in the film Where the Boys Are (1960) under the guise of Frank Gorshin's "Dialectic Jazz Band".

== Death ==
Rugolo died at the age of 95 on October 16, 2011, in Sherman Oaks, California.

== Discography ==
- Introducing Pete Rugolo (Columbia, 1954)
- Adventures in Rhythm (Columbia, 1955)
- Rugolomania (Columbia, 1955)
- Music for Hi-Fi Bugs (EmArcy, 1956)
- Out on a Limb (EmArcy, 1956)
- New Sounds by Pete Rugolo (Harmony, 1957)
- An Adventure in Sound: Reeds in Hi-Fi (Mercury, 1958)
- An Adventure in Sound: Brass in Hi-Fi (Mercury, 1958)
- Percussion at Work (Mercury, 1958)
- Rugolo Plays Kenton (EmArcy, 1958)
- The Music from Richard Diamond (EmArcy, 1959)
- Behind Brigitte Bardot (Warner Bros., 1960)
- 10 Trombones Like 2 Pianos (Mercury, 1960)
- The Original Music of Thriller (Time, 1961)
- Ten Trumpets and 2 Guitars (Mercury, 1961)
- 10 Saxophones and 2 Basses (Mercury, 1961)
- TV's Top Themes (Mercury, 1962)

=== As conductor/arranger ===
With Nat King Cole

- "Lush Life" (Capitol, 1949)
- The Nat King Cole Trio Vol. 4 (Capitol, 1949)
- "Frosty the Snowman" (Capitol, 1950)
- 10th Anniversary Album (Capitol, 1948–1953 [1955])
- The Nat King Cole Story (Capitol, 1961)

With June Christy

- Something Cool (Capitol, 1955)
- The Misty Miss Christy (Capitol, 1956)
- Fair and Warmer! (Capitol, 1957)
- Gone for the Day (Capitol, 1957)
- This Is June Christy! (Capitol, 1958)
- The Song Is June! (Capitol, 1958)
- Recalls Those Kenton Days (Capitol, 1959)
- Off-Beat (Capitol, 1960)
- This Time of Year (Capitol, 1961)

With Robert Clary

- Gigi (Mercury, 1958)

With Buddy Collette

- Buddy Collette's Swinging Shepherds (EmArcy, 1958)
- At the Cinema! (Mercury, 1959)

With The Diamonds

- The Diamonds Meet Pete Rugolo (Mercury, 1958)

With Vernon Duke

- Time Remembered (Mercury, 1957)

With Billy Eckstein

- Billy Eckstine's Imagination (EmArcy, 1958)

With The Four Freshmen

- Four Freshmen and 5 Trombones (Capitol, 1955)
- Four Freshmen and Five Saxes (Capitol, 1957)
- Voices in Latin (Capitol, 1957)
- Voices and Brass (Capitol, 1960)
- More 4 Freshmen and 5 Trombones (Capitol, 1964)

With Paul Horn

- House of Horn (Dot, 1957)

With Stan Kenton

- Stan Kenton's Milestones (Capitol, 1943-47 [1950])
- Stan Kenton Classics (Capitol, 1944-47 [1952])
- Artistry in Rhythm (Capitol, 1946)
- Encores (Capitol, 1947)
- A Presentation of Progressive Jazz (Capitol, 1947)
- Popular Favorites by Stan Kenton (Capitol, 1953)
- Kenton in Hi-Fi (Capitol, 1956)
- Lush Interlude (Capitol, 1958)
- Artistry in Voices and Brass (Capitol, 1963)

With Ruth Olay

- Olay! The New Sound of Ruth Olay (Mercury, 1959)

With Patti Page

- In the Land of Hi-Fi (Mercury, 1956)
- The East Side (Mercury, 1957)
- The West Side (Mercury, 1959)

=== Film and television scores ===
- The Strip (1951)
- The Stranger (1954)
- The Thin Man (1958–59)
- Jack the Ripper (1959)
- Richard Diamond, Private Detective (1959)
- Private Property (1960)
- Where the Boys Are (1960)
- The Tab Hunter Show (1960–61)
- Thriller (1960–61)
- My Three Sons (1961)
- General Electric Theater (1961)
- Ichabod and Me (1961)
- The Investigators (1961)
- Checkmate (1961–62)
- The Untouchables (1962)
- 87th Precinct (1962)
- Leave It to Beaver (1962–63)
- The Alfred Hitchcock Hour (1962–63)
- Arrest and Trial (1963)
- The Virginian (1963)
- The Richard Boone Show (1963)
- The Fugitive (1963–67)
- A French Honeymoon (1964)
- Many Happy Returns (1964–65)
- Kraft Suspense Theatre (1964–65)
- Two's Company (1965)
- Run for Your Life (1965–68)
- Blue Light (1966)
- Horatio Alger Jones (1966)
- Felony Squad (1966–69)
- Off to See the Wizard (1967)
- Vacation Playhouse (1967)
- Lost in Space (1968)
- The Sweet Ride (1968)
- The Outsider (1968)
- The Sound of Anger (1968)
- The Whole World Is Watching (1969)
- The Lonely Profession (1969)
- The Bold Ones: The Lawyers (1969–72)
- The Young Country (1970)
- The Challengers (1970)
- Don Knotts' Nice Clean, Decent, Wholesome Hour (1970)
- Alias Smith and Jones (1971–72)
- How to Steal an Airplane (1971)
- The Death of Me Yet (1971)
- Who Killed the Mysterious Mr. Foster? (1971)
- Do You Take This Stranger? (1971)
- Sanford and Son (1972)
- Hawaii Five-O (1972)
- Cool Million (1972)
- The Rookies (1972 & 1974)
- Toma (1973)
- The Letters (1973)
- Set This Town on Fire (1973)
- Letters from Three Lovers (1973)
- Drive Hard, Drive Fast (1973)
- Movin' On (1974)
- Police Woman (1974)
- The Story of Pretty Boy Floyd (1974)
- Death Cruise (1974)
- Death Stalk (1975)
- Last Hours Before Morning (1975)
- The Blue Knight (1975)
- M*A*S*H (1975)
- The Invisible Man (1975)
- Foxtrot (1976)
- The Far Side of Paradise (1976)
- Jigsaw John (1976)
- Family (1976-1979)
- The San Pedro Bums (1977)
- Kingston: Confidential (1977)
- Carter Country (1977)
- The Jordan Chance (1978)
- The Last Convertible (1979)
- Underground Aces (1981)
- Revenge of the Gray Gang (1981)
- Chu Chu and the Philly Flash (1981)
- For Lovers Only (1981)
- O'Malley (1983)
- Fantasy Island (1983)
- Blue Thunder (1984)
- This World, Then the Fireworks (1997)

== See also ==
- List of jazz arrangers
