= Jonathan and Darlene's Greatest Hits: Volume 2 =

Compilation album by Jo Stafford and Paul Weston
- Released: February 22, 1994
- Genre: Traditional pop comedy
- Label: Corinthian Records

Jo Stafford and Paul Weston chronology
| Jonathan and Darlene's Greatest Hits | Jonathan and Darlene's Greatest Hits: Volume 2 |

Jonathan and Darlene's Greatest Hits: Volume 2 is a 1994 compilation album of songs by Paul Weston and Jo Stafford recorded in the guise of Jonathan and Darlene Edwards, a New Jersey lounge act who performed deliberately off-key, putting their own interpretation on popular songs. The album was released by Corinthian Records on February 22, 1994.

== Track listing ==
1. Cocktails for Two
2. Tiptoe Through the Tulips
3. Ain't Misbehavin'
4. The Object of My Affections
5. Five Foot Two, Eyes of Blue
6. Sophisiticated Lady
7. Play a Simple Melody
8. I'm Beginning to See the Light
9. For Me and My Gal
10. La Vie En Rose
11. Pretty Baby
12. Paris in the Spring
13. That Certain Party
14. It's Magic
