= Harry's Choice! =

Studio album by Harry James
- Released: 1958
- Recorded: Hollywood, June 1958
- Genre: Jazz, big band
- Label: Capitol

Harry's Choice! is a studio album by American trumpeter Harry James with The Harry James Orchestra. The album was recorded in Hollywood, California in June, 1958 and released by Capitol Records on stereo LP (ST-1093), mono LP (T-1093), and a series of three EPs (EAP 1-1093, EAP 2-1093 and EAP 3-1093).

After coasting through the mid-1950s, James made a complete reevaluation of where he was heading in his musical career. Count Basie provided the impetus by making a significant comeback with his newly formed "16 Men Swinging" band, and James wanted a band with a decided Basie flavor. This album is the third of several released on Capitol Records representative of the Basie style that James adopted during this period, with some of the arrangements provided by former Basie saxophonist and arranger Ernie Wilkins, whom James hired for his own band.

== Track listing ==
No.	Title	Writer(s)	Arranger(s)	Length
1.	"You're My Thrill"	Jay Gorney, Sidney Clare	J. Hill	4:03
2.	"Willow Weep for Me"	Ann Ronell	Ernie Wilkins	3:05
3.	"Blues for Sale"	Ernie Wilkins, Harry James	Ernie Wilkins	4:57
4.	"I Want a Little Girl"	Billy Moll, Murray Mencher	Ernie Wilkins	3:41
5.	"Moten Swing"	Benny Moten, Buster Moten	Ernie Wilkins	4:28
6.	"(Do You Know What It Means To Miss) New Orleans"	Eddie DeLange, Louis Alter	J. Hill	2:49
7.	"Just for Fun"	Ernie Wilkins	Ernie Wilkins	5:10
8.	"The New Two O'Clock Jump"	Benny Goodman, Count Basie, Harry James	Neal Hefti	6:15

== Personnel ==
- Harry James - leader, trumpet
- Willie Smith, Bob Poland, Ernie Small, Herb Lorden, Sam Firmature - saxophone
- Bob Wolfe, Nick Buono, Ollie Mitchell - trumpet
- Bob Edmondson, Ernie Tack, Ray Sims - trombone
- Jack Perciful - piano
- Dennis Budimir - guitar
- Russ Phillips - bass
- Jackie Mills - drums
