= Joe Frank and the Knights =

American garage rock band

- Origin: Leland, Mississippi, United States
- Genres: Garage rock; rock & roll
- Years active: 1959–1965
- Labels: Cent. Ltd; Rim; El-Jay; ABC
- Past members

Joe Frank and the Knights were an American garage rock band from Leland, Mississippi who were active between 1959 and 1965. They were led by Joe Frank Carollo. In the early-to-mid 1960s their popularity grew beyond the Mississippi Delta and Memphis areas as they became one of the most popular groups in various parts of the Southern United States. They had a regional hit with "Can't Find a Way", which attracted the attention of ABC Records who picked up the record and re-released it for national distribution. However, the band broke up shortly thereafter, and Carollo joined the T-Bones, who later evolved into the soft rock trio Hamilton, Joe Frank & Reynolds in the early 1970s.

== Background ==
Joe Frank and the Knights were formed in 1959 as a merger between two Leland, Mississippi, Mississippi bands: the Bobcats, who were headed by Joe Frank Carollo, and the Rollons. Another member, Nicky Griffiths, was added on guitar to the new unit. As the Knights, they became one of the most popular bands in the Mississippi Delta and Memphis areas and eventually by the early 1960s their popularity grew to envelop much of the South, where they travelled in their Volkswagen Microbus and were much in-demand for sock hops and frat parties. Another popular group, Tommy Burk and the Counts often competed with them in battles of the bands, which often drew large crowds. In the early years the band had a horn section, but eventually pared-down their lineup to achieve a tougher sound as Carollo was a blues enthusiast. A standout member in the group was their drummer Joe Carrero, who would amaze audiences with his intricate fills showmanship.

== Career ==
The group recorded their 1962 debut single, Chuck Berry's "Carol" b/w ""Be My Love", at Singing River Studios in Jackson, Mississippi. Both sides of the record were given a 3 star rating by Billboard Music Week.

In 1963 they went to Tim Whitsett's home studio in a garage to record a rendition of the Chuck Barris-penned "Palisades Park" which had been a hit for Freddie Cannon, which would serve as their next single released that year on Rim Records. During the recording, the producer and group enlisted some girls from a local high school as standers-by to clap and make background noise in what the label would advertise as a song "recorded live from the Delta".

In 1964 the group released a single for the El-Jay label, "Twistin' Mississippi" b/w "Five Elephants in a Volkswagon". The single was produced and engineered by J. Boyd Ingram and Lyle Mitchell. It was reviewed in the December 28 issue of Cash Box. The record was given a B rating. The reviewer said that the bluesy instrumental could be a noise maker. The year they recorded the song for which they are best known, "Can't Find a Way", which would be the A-side of the next single backed with "Won't You Come on Home", which originally appeared on Block Records. The song became a big regional hit and attracted the interest of ABC Records, who re-issued the single on their national label. Just as Joe Frank and the Knights were achieving growing success in late 1965, they broke up.

== Post Joe Frank and the Knights ==
Joe Frank Carollo went on to join the T-Bones, who had a hit with the instrumental "No Matter What Shape (Your Stomach's In), " in 1966 that reached #3 on the Billboard Hot 100. The T-Bones membership eventually morphed into the successful soft rock trio, Hamilton, Joe Frank & Reynolds, who recorded several albums and had major hits with "Don't Pull Your Love", which went to #4 on the Billboard charts in 1971 and "Fallin' in Love", which became a #1 smash hit in 1975.

== Legacy and later years ==
Joe Frank and the Knights' work has come to attention of garage rock collectors and enthusiasts. "Can't Find a Way" appears on the compilation, A history of garage and frat bands in Memphis, 1960-1975 Volume 1. It is also included on the Psychedelic States: Mississippi In The 60s CD compilation released in 2009 by Gear Fab Records.

== Membership 1957-1967 ==
- Joe Frank Carollo (vocals, bass)
- Charles Purvis (drums)
- Joe Carrero, Jr. (drums)
- John Dewitt (organ)
- Mark Tidwell (guitar)
- Walker Sory (organ)
- Nicky Griffith (guitar)
- DD Fericci (saxophone)
- Miro Fericci (saxophone)
- Don Skelton (trombone)

== Discography ==
- "Carol" b/w "Be My Love" (Cent. Ltd. 511, 1962)
- "Palisades Park" b/w "Please Come Back" (Rim 4111, 1963)
- "Twistin' Mississippi" b/w "Five Elephants in a Volkswagen" (El-Jay 100463, 1964)
- "Can't Find a Way" b/w "Won't You Come on Home" (Block 510, 1965) (ABC 10782, 1965)

== Bibliography ==
- Hall, Ron (2001). Playing for a Piece of the Door: A History of Garage & Frat Bands in Memphis 1960-1975 (1st ed.). Memphis: Sharngri-La Projects. ISBN 0-9668575-1-8.
- Markesich, Mike (2012). Teenbeat Mayhem (1st ed.). Branford, Connecticut: Priceless Info Press. ISBN 978-0-985-64825-1.
