= Jazz & Romantic Places =

Studio album by Dave Pell Octet
- Released: 1955
- Recorded: April 21, 23 & 26, 1955; Los Angeles, CA
- Genre: Jazz
- Label: Atlantic; LP 1216

Dave Pell chronology
The Dave Pell Octet Plays Rodgers & Hart (1954)	Jazz & Romantic Places (1955)	Love Story (1956)

Jazz & Romantic Places is an album by American jazz saxophonist and bandleader Dave Pell, released on the Atlantic label in 1955.

== Reception ==
Professional ratings
Review scores
Source	Rating
Allmusic	4/5 stars

Scott Yanow of Allmusic calls the album "a very enjoyable LP that has been out of print for decades and it may be somewhat challenging to locate".

== Track listing ==
1. "How Are Things in Glocca Morra? (Yip Harburg, Burton Lane) - 2:57
2. "On a Slow Boat to China" (Frank Loesser) - 3:54
3. "Memphis in June" (Hoagy Carmichael, Paul Francis Webster) - 2:55
4. "Paris in the Spring" (Mack Gordon, Harry Revel) - 2:54
5. "London in July" (Vernon Duke, Sammy Cahn) - 4:26
6. "Isle of Capri" (Wilhelm Grosz, Jimmy Kennedy) - 2:33
7. "The White Cliffs of Dover" (Nat Burton, Walter Kent) - 2:55
8. "Sunday in Savannah" (Hugh Mackay) - 3:20
9. "Deep in the Heart of Texas" (June Hershey, Don Swander) - 4:06
10. "Shuffle Off to Buffalo" (Al Dubin, Harry Warren) - 3:39
11. "New Orleans" (Hoagy Carmichael) - 3:25
12. "Flying Down to Rio" (Edward Eliscu, Gus Kahn, Vincent Youmans) - 2:47

== Personnel ==
- Dave Pell - tenor saxophone
- Don Fagerquist - trumpet
- Ray Sims - trombone
- Bob Gordon - baritone saxophone, bass clarinet
- Donn Trenner - piano, celeste
- Tony Rizzi - guitar
- Buddy Clark - bass
- Bill Richmond - drums
- Shorty Rogers - musical director
- John Palladino - recording engineer
