= The New James =

Studio album by Harry James
- Released: 1958
- Recorded: Hollywood, April 1–3, 1958
- Genre: Jazz, big band
- Label: Capitol Records

The New James is a studio album by American trumpeter Harry James with The Harry James Orchestra. The album was recorded April 1–3, 1958 and released by Capitol Records on stereo LP (ST-1037), mono LP (T-1037), and a series of three EPs (EAP 1-1037, EAP 2-1037 and EAP 3-1037).

After coasting through the mid-1950s, James made a complete reevaluation of where he was heading in his musical career. Count Basie provided the impetus by making a significant comeback with his newly formed "16 Men Swinging" band, and James wanted a band with a decided Basie flavor. This album is the second of several released on Capitol representative of the Basie style that James adopted during this period, with some of the arrangements provided by former Basie saxophonist and arranger Ernie Wilkins, whom James hired for his own band.

== Track listing ==
No.	Title	Writer(s)	Length
1.	"Fair and Warmer"	Ernie Wilkins	4:15
2.	"J Walkin'"	J. Hill	3:48
3.	"One On The House"	Ernie Wilkins	4:29
4.	"Just Lucky"	J. Hill	3:04
5.	"Bangtail"	Ernie Wilkins	4:38
6.	"Warm Blue Stream"	Sarah Cassey, arr. Ernie Wilkins	5:25
7.	"Here's One"	Bill Holman	3:27
8.	"Bells"	Neal Hefti	2:21
9.	"Walkin' On Air"	J. Hill	4:54

== Personnel ==
- Leader, Trumpet – Harry James
- Saxophone – Willie Smith, Ernest Small, Herb Lorden, Bob Poland, Sam Firmature
- Trumpet – Robert (Bob) Rolfe, Nick Buono, Ollie Mitchell
- Trombone – Robert (Bob) Edmondson, Ernie Tack, Ray Sims
- Piano – Jack Perciful
- Guitar – Dennis Budimir
- Bass – Russ Phillips
- Drums - Jackie Mills
