= Harry James and His Orchestra, 1948–49 =

Live album by Harry James
- Released: 1969
- Recorded: Radio Transcripts, 1948–1949
- Genres: Jazz, big band
- Label: Big Band Landmarks

Harry James and His Orchestra, 1948–49 is a double album by American trumpeter Harry James with The Harry James Orchestra. The album consists of live radio transcripts recorded during 1948 and 1949 and was released in 1969 by Big Band Landmarks (Volumes X–XI).

== Background ==
As bop surpassed swing by the late 1940s, James was surprisingly open to its influence. For the tracks on this album, James had dropped his string section and vocalists and employed a variety of modern arrangements by Neal Hefti, Frank Devenport, Johnny Richards and Jimmy Mundy, which often inspired his musicians.

Because of the musicians' strike that lasted for the duration of 1948, James recorded no new material for commercial release by his record label Columbia during this period, and outside of this period when he did record for Columbia, the label tended to focus more on James's pop releases. The combination of these two factors makes these tracks some of the few available that represent James's jazz style during this period. This is unfortunate because as music critic Marc Myers has stated, "[James's] band of the mid-1940s was more modern than most of the majors, and in 1949 he led one of the finest bands of the year."

The following is the promotional note from the Fresh Sound Records' CD reissue There They Go:

"[These tracks] come from airslots, complete with typical announcements by radio MCs of the era, and Harry James himself also says a few words here and there. The album gets off to a storming start with trumpeter Neal Hefti's "There They Go" and apart from one slow number, it's swinging big band music all the way, with a roaring brass section, a swinging sax section and a four-man rhythm section that drives the band along in fine style. Twelve of the twenty numbers come from the pen of Hefti, and they evince a definite Basie influence. The tireless Harry James is the principal soloist and plays everywhere with a lip-busting ferocity, and the biting well-drilled trumpet section provides him with a brilliant backing, especially on "Snooty Fruity" and "Rank Frank". "Forgotten", a very attractive romantic theme by Frank Davenport, is the longest track and the only slow ballad on the entire album, and features some very pretty playing from Willie Smith and Corky Corcoran, both of whom are in top form throughout the album. "Cotton Tail" is played by a small unit from within the band while "Kerina" has a Latin-American feel to it with some mariachi-type trumpet from Harry James, but space does not permit an appraisal of every track. It is enough to say that this is a big band album for pure enjoyment in which the spirited playing and contagious enthusiasm from the entire band is almost overwhelming. Exhilarating stuff."

== Track listing ==
Side one
No.	Title	Writer(s)	Length
1.	"There They Go"	Neal Hefti	2:36
2.	"'Cept February, Which Has 28"	Neal Hefti	2:21
3.	"You Turned the Tables on Me"	Louis Alter and Sidney D. Mitchell, arr. Neal Hefti	3:25
4.	"Snooty Fruity"	Jimmy Mundy	2:39
5.	"Things Ain't What They Used to Be"	Mercer Ellington and Ted Persons, arr. Frank Devenport	3:45
6.	"Lover"	Richard Rodgers and Lorenz Hart, arr. Johnny Richards	3:29

Side two
No.	Title	Writer(s)	Length
1.	"Or Words to That Effect"	Neal Hefti	2:43
2.	"Big Boy"	Jimmy Mundy	2:30
3.	"The Arrival"	Neal Hefti	2:45
4.	"Raffles"	Neal Hefti	2:32
5.	"Six, Two and Even"	Neal Hefti	3:51
6.	"Bells"	Neal Hefti	2:06

Side three
No.	Title	Writer(s)	Length
1.	"Shine"	Cecil Mack, Lew Brown and Ford Dabney, arr. Jack Mathias	2:58
2.	"Block Party"	Neal Hefti	2:11
3.	"Forgotten"	Frank Devenport	5:37
4.	"Cottontail"	Duke Ellington, arr. Frank Devenport	3:35
5.	"I May Be Wrong"	Henry Sullivan and Harry Ruskin, arr. Johnny Richards	3:27

Side four
No.	Title	Writer(s)	Length
1.	"Proclamation"	Neal Hefti	3:29
2.	"Slap Happy"	Frank Devenport	3:11
3.	"Kerina (Chiarina)"	Neal Hefti	2:32
4.	"Bluebeard's Blues"	Neal Hefti	2:38
5.	"Rank Frank"	Jimmy Mundy	2:10

Notes

- The tracks on disc 1 were released in Germany as a single album entitled Harry James and His Orchestra 1948–1949, Vol. 1 by the Solid Sender label (SOL 501).
- All but the last two songs were re-issued on a CD entitled Harry James and his Orchestra 1948–1949, There They Go (Arrangements by Neal Hefti) by Spain's Fresh Sound label (FSRCD 399).
- Eighteen of the songs were re-issued in 1994 on a CD entitled Things Ain't What They Used To Be by the Four Star label (FS-40053).

== Recording dates / locations ==
Selections on the album are from six sessions recorded from 1948 to 1950. The "Navy Show" numbers in parentheses below refer to the numbers of the original 16" transcriptions circulated only to radio stations for recruiting advertising.

CBS "Call for Music Show" – recorded February 20, 1948 in Hollywood, California: A4: Snooty Fruity

CBS "Call for Music Show" – recorded May 18, 1948 in Hollywood, California: A6: Lover

CBS "Call for Music Show" – recorded June 15, 1948 in Hollywood, California: A3: You Turned The Tables On Me

"U.S. Navy Presents" – recorded June 1949 in Hollywood, California: A1: There They Go (USN 106) / B4: Raffles (USN 105) / B5: Six, Two And Even (USN 105) / B6: Bells (USN 105) / C1: Shine (USN 107) / C2: Block Party (USN 108) / C3: Forgotten (USN 108) / C4: Cottontail (USN 113) / D1: Proclamation (USN 110) / D2: Slap Happy (USN 111)

"U.S. Navy Presents" – recorded July 1949 in Hollywood, California: A2: 'Cept February, Which Has 28 (USN 101) / A5: Things Ain't What They Used To Be (USN 114) / B1: Or Words To That Effect (USN 101) / B2: Big Boy (USN 102) / B3: The Arrival (USN 102) / D3: Kerina (USN 114)

"U.S. Navy Presents the Land's Best Bands" – recorded November, 1950 in Hollywood, California: C5: I May Be Wrong (USN 4A) / D4: Bluebeard's Blues (USN 4A) / D5: Rank Frank (USN 12A)

== Personnel ==
- Harry James – leader, trumpet
- Everett McDonald – trumpet (tracks: A2, A5, B1-B3, C5, D3-D5)
- Gene Komer – trumpet (tracks: A3, A4, A6)
- Neal Hefti – trumpet (tracks: A1, B4-B6, C1-C4, D1, D2)
- Nick Buono – trumpet
- Phil Cook - trumpet (tracks: C5, D4, D5)
- Pinky Savitt – trumpet (tracks: all except C5, D4, D5)
- Ralph Osborne – trumpet
- Willie Smith – alto saxophone
- Musky Ruffo – alto saxophone (tracks: C5, D4, D5)
- Al Pellegrini – alto saxophone, clarinet (tracks: A1, B4-B6, C1-C4, D1, D2)
- Eddie Rosa – alto saxophone, clarinet (tracks: A2-A6, B1-B3, D3)
- Corky Corcoran – tenor saxophone
- Jimmy Cook – tenor saxophone (tracks: A2, A5, B1-B3, D3)
- Sam Sachelle - tenor saxophone, baritone saxophone (tracks: A1, A3, A4, A6, B4-B6, C1-C4, D1, D2)
- Bob Poland – baritone saxophone
- Carl "Ziggy" Elmer – trombone
- Chuck Preble – trombone (tracks: A1, A3, A4, A6, B4-B6, C1-C4, D1, D2)
- Dave Robbins – trombone (tracks: A1, A2, A5, B1-B6, C1-C4, D1-D3)
- Jimmy Palmer - trombone (tracks: C5, D4, D5)
- Juan Tizol – trombone
- Lee O'Conner - trombone (tracks: A2, A5, B1-B3, C5, D3-D5)
- Victor Hamann – trombone (tracks: A3, A4, A6)
- Bruce MacDonald – piano
- Jack Marshall - guitar (tracks: C5, D4, D5)
- Tiny Timbrell – guitar (tracks: A1, A3, A4, A6, B4-B6, C1-C4, D1, D2)
- Tony Rizzi - guitar (tracks: A2, A5, B1-B3, D3)
- Abe Luboff - bass (tracks: C5, D4, D5)
- Artie Bernstein - bass (tracks: A2, A5, B1-B3, D3)
- Ed Mihelich - bass (tracks: A3, A4, A6)
- Joe Mondragon – bass (tracks: A1, A2, A5, B1-B6, C1-C4, D1-D3)
- Bob Neel - drums (tracks: C5, D4, D5)
- Buddy Combine - drums (tracks: A3, A4, A6)
- Don Lamond – drums (tracks: A2, A5, B1-B3, D3)
- Frank Bode – drums (tracks: A1, B4-B6, C1-C4, D1, D2)
- Louis Bellson – drums (tracks D4 and D5) (Note: The back cover credits drums to Louis Bellson on tracks D4 and D5, while The Jazz Discography does not, and The Jazz Discography adds additional credits missing from the back cover.)
