= Jonathan and Darlene's Greatest Hits =

Compilation album by Jo Stafford and Paul Weston
- Released: September 11, 1993
- Genre: Traditional pop comedy
- Label: Corinthian Records

Jo Stafford and Paul Weston chronology
Jonathan and Darlene's Greatest Hits	Jonathan and Darlene's Greatest Hits: Volume 2

Jonathan and Darlene's Greatest Hits is a 1993 compilation album of songs by Paul Weston and Jo Stafford recorded in the guise of Jonathan and Darlene Edwards, a New Jersey lounge act who performed deliberately off-key, putting their own interpretation on popular songs. The album was released by Corinthian Records on September 11, 1993.

== Track listing ==
1. I Love Paris
2. Dizzy Fingers
3. Take the "A" Train
4. You're Blase
5. Alabama Bound
6. Nola
7. I Am Woman
8. Don't Get Around Much Anymore
9. The Last Time I Saw Paris
10. Honeysuckle Rose
11. Autumn in New York
12. Be My Little Baby Bumble Bee
13. April in Paris
14. Stayin' Alive
