= You're Blasé =

Song
- Written: 1931
- Songwriters: Ord Hamilton; Bruce Sievier

"You're Blasé" is a jazz standard composed in 1931 by Ord Hamilton (1900–1955) with lyrics by Bruce Sievier (1894–1953) and introduced by Binnie Hale in John Murray Anderson's production of the London musical revue Bow Bells (1932). (Hamilton wrote the standard "My Sweet" (1932) and Sievier wrote the English version of "Parlez-moi d'amour" (1930) by Jean Lenoir.)

Early popular recordings of "You're Blasé" in 1932 were by Jack Hylton and His Orchestra (vocal by Pat O'Malley), and by Gus Arnheim and His Orchestra (vocal by Meri Bell).

== Cover versions ==
- Binnie Hale (1932) (Binnie Hale#Discography)
- Adelaide Hall, 1939, BBC Studios, London.
- Ella Fitzgerald - for her albums Like Someone in Love (1957) and Take Love Easy (1973).
- Sarah Vaughan recorded the song on her album How Long Has This Been Going On? (1978). Musicians on the recording were pianist Oscar Peterson, guitarist Joe Pass, bassist Ray Brown, and drummer Louis Bellson.
- Julie London recorded the song on her first album Bethlehem's Girlfriends (1955) for Bethlehem Records.
- Stan Getz recorded the ballad on his 1956 album The Steamer for Verve Records
- Peggy Lee - for her album Dream Street (1957)
- Jonathan and Darlene Edwards - included on the album The Piano Artistry of Jonathan Edwards (1957)
- Louis Armstrong - included in his album Louis Under the Stars (1958)
- Kate Ceberano recorded a version for her album Like Now (1990).
- Mark Murphy - Song for the Geese (1997)
- June Christy - Cool Christy (2002)
