= J. Hill =

American music arranger

J. Hill (born James Hill) is an American music arranger who worked extensively in his earlier years as a brass player in big bands, later on taking up music arranging. He has received three Emmy Awards. For Les Brown Orchestra, he composed many arrangements. He eventually spread out into freelance arranging, doing charts for Lawrence Welk, Harry James, Bob Hope, and others. He also became chief arranger for the first four years of the Dean Martin Show (which featured Bandleader "Les Brown and his Band of Renown"), producing orchestrations for Dean and his co-stars to sing behind. He was eventually replaced on the show by Van Alexander who did the remainder of the show's run.

== Discography ==
With Harry James

- Wild About Harry! (Capitol Records – ST 874, 1957)
- The New James (Capitol Records – ST 1037, 1958)
- Harry's Choice! (Capitol Records – ST 1093, 1958)
