= The Piano Artistry of Jonathan Edwards =

Studio album by Jo Stafford and Paul Weston (Gene Krupa, drums)
- Released: 1957
- Genre: Traditional pop Comedy
- Label: Columbia

Professional ratings
Review scores
| Source | Rating |
|---|---|
| Allmusic | 3/5 stars |

The Piano Artistry of Jonathan Edwards is a 1957 album of songs by the married couple Paul Weston and Jo Stafford in the guise of Jonathan and Darlene Edwards, a New Jersey lounge act. They are accompanied by Gene Krupa on drums. Weston deliberately plays the piano with wrong notes and other oddities, while Stafford sings off-key (mostly sharp), putting their own interpretation on popular songs. The album cover and liner notes play it straight, except that the photo of "Jonathan Edwards" shows two right hands playing the piano. Most of the tracks feature Weston's piano playing, although on four he is accompanied by "Darlene". The album was released by Columbia Records (Catalog No: CL 1024) in 1957. It was re-released in 1985 by Corinthian Records.

== Track listing ==
=== Side one ===
1. It Might As Well Be Spring
2. Poor Butterfly
3. Autumn in New York (v. Darlene Edwards)
4. Nola
5. Stardust
6. It's Magic (v. Darlene Edwards)

=== Side two ===
1. Sunday, Monday or Always
2. Jealousy
3. Cocktails for Two (v. Darlene Edwards)
4. Dizzy Fingers
5. Three Coins in the Fountain
6. You're Blasé (v. Darlene Edwards)
