= Wild About Harry! =

Studio album by Harry James
- Released: 1957
- Recorded: Hollywood, May 1957
- Genre: Jazz, big band
- Label: Capitol

Wild About Harry! is a studio album by the American trumpeter Harry James with The Harry James Orchestra. The album was recorded in May 1957 and released by Capitol Records on stereo LP (ST-874), mono LP (T-874), and a series of three EPs (EAP 1-874, EAP 2-874 and EAP 3-874).

After coasting through the mid-1950s, James made a complete re-evaluation of where he was heading in his musical career. Count Basie provided the impetus by making a significant comeback with his newly formed "16 Men Swinging" band, and James wanted a band with a decided Basie flavor. This album is the first of three released on Capitol Records representative of the Basie style that James adopted during this period, with some of the arrangements provided by the former Basie saxophonist and arranger Ernie Wilkins, whom James hired for his own band.

By the time of the scheduled recording of the album in May 1957, the drummer, Buddy Rich, had long since left James's band, but knowing Rich's admiration for Basie's music, James asked Rich to play on the album. Rich was billed as "Buddy Poor" since he was still under contract to Verve Records. James was so pleased by the results from the first day of recording that he wore the same black-and-white striped shirt on the other sessions for the album.

== Track listing ==
| No. | Title | Writer(s) | Length |
|---|---|---|---|
| 1. | "Kinda Like The Blues" | Ernie Wilkins | 4:14 |
| 2. | "Blues for Lovers Only" | Wilkins | 4:42 |
| 3. | "Countin'" | Harry James, Larry Kinnamon | 3:11 |
| 4. | "Cotton Pickin'" | James, James Hill | 3:26 |
| 5. | "Ring for Porter" | James (arr. Herb Lorden) | 3:42 |
| 6. | "Barn 12" | James (arr. Lorden) | 4:14 |
| 7. | "What Am I Here For" | Duke Ellington | 4:53 |
| 8. | "Blues for Harry's Sake" | Wilkins | 2:39 |
| 9. | "Bee Gee" | James (arr. Lorden) | 3:59 |
| 10. | "Blues On a Count" | James, Hill | 3:22 |

== Personnel ==
- Leader, trumpet, liner notes – Harry James
- Saxophone – Willie Smith, Corky Corcoran, Ernest Small, Francis Polifroni, Herb Lorden
- Trumpet – Robert Rolfe, Don Paladino, Nick Buono, Ray Linn
- Trombone – Robert Edmondson, Herb Harper, Robert Robinson
- Piano – Larry Kinnamon
- Guitar – Allan Reuss
- Double bass – Russ Phillips
- Drums - Buddy Poor (pseudonym for Buddy Rich)
