= Cocktails for Two =

Song by Carl Brisson
- Published: 1934
- Genre: Swing
- Songwriters: Arthur Johnston, Sam Coslow

"Cocktails for Two" is a song from the Big Band era, written by Arthur Johnston and Sam Coslow. The song debuted in the movie Murder at the Vanities (1934), where it was introduced by the Danish singer and actor Carl Brisson. Duke Ellington's version of the song was recorded in 1934 and was inducted into the Grammy Hall of Fame in 2007.

The song alludes to Repeal, the ending of Prohibition in the United States. The introduction begins with:

Oh what delight to
Be given the right to
Be carefree and gay once again.
No longer slinking,
Respectably drinking
Like civilized ladies and men.

The song was written in 1934, and the 21st Amendment, which ended Prohibition, was ratified in December of the previous year.

== Renditions ==
Spike Jones and His City Slickers: Cocktails for Two
16-second sample, as the musical mayhem begins

Ellington's recording in 1934 of "Cocktails for Two" was by far the most popular of the year, and his second biggest hit of the year behind "Solitude" later on. Other popular version were also made by the orchestras of Johnny Green and Will Osborne, for the ARC (Green on Brunswick; Osborne on Melotone--among other labels), but possibly its best known version is the comedic sound effects-laden version by Spike Jones and His City Slickers a decade later. The Slickers first recorded it in 1944 with Carl Grayson supplying the vocal. It was their biggest all-time hit, reaching number 4 on the charts, according to Joel Whitburn. Sam Coslow hated Jones' irreverent treatment. Even so, the recording's success earned him large royalties. In 2026, Jones' recording of the song was selected by the Library of Congress for preservation in the National Recording Registry for its "cultural, historical or aesthetic importance in the nation's recorded sound heritage."

Jonathan and Darlene Edwards (a comedy act by Paul Weston and Jo Stafford) also lampooned the song on their first LP, The Piano Artistry of Jonathan Edwards, released in 1957.

Bing Crosby recorded the song in 1955 for use on his radio show and it was subsequently included in the box set The Bing Crosby CBS Radio Recordings (1954-56) issued by Mosaic Records (catalog MD7-245) in 2009.

Other covers include Zarah Leander's Swedish version for Odeon in 1934, Tommy Dorsey's swing version for Victor (#26145) on October 31, 1938, Keely Smith's version on her album Politely! (1958), and Ray Charles and Betty Carter for their album Ray Charles and Betty Carter (1961).
