= Willie Smith (alto saxophonist) =

American jazz saxophonist (1910–1967)

- Smith, c. 1947; by William P. Gottlieb

Background information
- Born: William McLeish Smith; November 25, 1910; Charleston, South Carolina, U.S.
- Died: March 7, 1967 (aged 56) Los Angeles, California, U.S.
- Genre: Jazz
- Occupation: Musician
- Instruments: Alto saxophone; clarinet; vocals
- Years active: 1920s–1960s
- Formerly of: Jimmie Lunceford; Charlie Spivak; Harry James; Duke Ellington; Billy May; Gene Krupa
- Education: Fisk University

William McLeish Smith (November 25, 1910 – March 7, 1967) was an American jazz saxophonist and one of the major alto saxophone players of the swing era. He also played the clarinet and sang.

== Early life ==
Smith was born and raised in Charleston, South Carolina, and attended the Avery Institute. His first instrument was the clarinet and his education was in chemistry. He received his chemistry degree from Fisk University, an HBCU.

== Career ==
In 1929, Smith became an alto saxophonist for Jimmie Lunceford's band, becoming one of the main stars in the group. In 1940, he led his own quintet as a side project. His success with Lunceford had lost its charms by 1942, as he now wanted more pay and less travel. Smith moved to the Charlie Spivak orchestra for a year and was in the U.S. Navy for another year. He then switched to Harry James's orchestra, where he made more money, and stayed with him for seven years. After that, he worked with Duke Ellington and Billy May. He was also a member of the Gene Krupa Trio and can be heard on the 1952 Verve live album The Drum Battle, part of Norman Granz's Jazz at the Philharmonic series (the "battle" was between Krupa and Buddy Rich). In 1954, he returned to Harry James's band.

== Death ==
Smith died of cancer on March 7, 1967, in Los Angeles, California, at the age of 56.

== Style ==
The jazz critic John S. Wilson described Smith as "one of the triumvirate of great jazz alto saxophonists before Charlie Parker arrived. The other two were Johnny Hodges, who had a fat, luscious tone, and Benny Carter, a model of clean, pure-toned playing. Stylistically, Smith fell between Carter and Hodges for he combined some of Carter's clarity and singing directness with a variant of Hodges' gut sound."

== Discography ==
=== As sideman ===
With Louis Bellson

- Journey into Love (Norgran, 1954) – arrangements by Buddy Baker
- Skin Deep (Norgran, 1955)
- Drumorama! (Verve, 1957)
- Music, Romance and Especially Love (Verve, 1957)

With Nat King Cole

- After Midnight (Capitol, 1956)
- The Piano Style of Nat King Cole (Capitol, 1956)
- Nat King Cole and Lester Young (Crown, 1964)

With Harry James

- Harry James in Hi-fi (Capitol, 1955)
- Jazz Session (Columbia, 1955)
- Juke Box Jamboree (Columbia, 1955)
- More Harry James in Hi-fi (Capitol, 1956)
- Wild About Harry! (Capitol, 1957)
- The New James (Capitol, 1958)
- Harry's Choice! (Capitol, 1958)
- Harry James and His New Swingin' Band (MGM, 1959)
- Harry James... Today! (MGM, 1960)
- The Spectacular Sound of Harry James (MGM, 1961)
- Harry James Plays Neal Hefti (MGM, 1961)
- Requests On-the-Road (MGM, 1962)
- Double Dixie (MGM, 1963)
- Harry James and His Orchestra, 1948–49 (Big Band Landmarks, 1969)

With Gene Krupa

- The Exciting Gene Krupa (Clef, 1953)
- Drum Boogie (Clef, 1956)
- The Drum Battle (Verve, 1960) – with Buddy Rich

With others

- Charlie Barnet, Charlie Barnet Big Band – 1967 (Vault, 1966)
- Duke Ellington, Seattle Concert (RCA Victor, 1952)
- Stan Getz, Groovin' High (Modern, 1956)
- Dizzy Gillespie, Jazz Recital (Norgran, 1955)
- Lionel Hampton, With the Just Jazz All-Stars (GNP, 1955)
- Billie Holiday, Lady Sings the Blues (Clef, 1956)
- Barney Kessel, Modern Jazz Performances from Bizet's Opera Carmen (Contemporary, 1959)
- Jimmie Lunceford, Lunceford Special (Columbia, 1967)
- Jimmie Lunceford, Stomp It Off (GRP, 1992)
- Billy May, Today! (Capitol, 1966)
- Rose Murphy, Not Cha-Cha but Chi-Chi (Verve, 1957)
- Red Norvo, Red Plays the Blues (RCA Victor, 1958)
- André Previn, Previn at Sunset (Polydor, 1972)
- Googie René, Romesville (Class, 1959)
- Kay Starr, Portrait of a Starr (Sunset, 1966)
