= Lucy Ann Polk =

American singer

- Born: May 16, 1927; Sandpoint, Idaho, U.S.
- Died: October 10, 2011 (aged 84) Glendale, California
- Genres: Jazz
- Occupation: Singer
- Years active: 1940s–1960
- Label: Trend
- Formerly of: The Town Criers

Lucy Ann Polk (May 16, 1927 – October 10, 2011) was an American jazz singer who performed with Les Brown's orchestra in the 1950s.

She also sang and recorded with Bob Crosby, Kay Kyser, Tommy Dorsey, Jerry Fielding, and Dave Pell.

== Early years ==
Polk was born in Sandpoint, Idaho, and raised in Spokane. She began singing professionally on KHQ radio there at age 9.

== Career ==
Polk began her music career with her sister and brothers in a quartet named the Four Polks, which was eventually changed to the Town Criers. They performed with big bands led by Les Brown, Lionel Hampton, and Kay Kyser until they disbanded in 1948. Polk became the lead vocalist with the Les Brown Orchestra. From 1952 to 1954, she was named Best Girl Singer with Band by Down Beat magazine.

She began her solo career with the album Lucy Ann Polk with the Dave Pell Octet (Trend, 1954), followed by Lucky Lucy Ann (Mode, 1957; reissued by Interlude under the name Easy Livin in 1959). The latter album featured arrangements by Marty Paich. On both albums, she sang jazz and traditional pop songs by Duke Ellington, Billy Strayhorn, Hoagy Carmichael, Cole Porter, Sammy Cahn, Jule Styne, and Jimmy Van Heusen. She released no more albums and ended her career in 1960.

== Personal life ==
In 1946, Polk married Dick Noel, who played trombone with Les Brown's orchestra.

== Discography ==
- 1949-57 - Imagination (SSJ, 2013) (w Les Brown Orchestra)
- 1950-53 - With the Les Brown Orchestra 1950–1953 (Olfert Dappers, 1997)
- 1954 - With the Dave Pell Octet (Trend, 1954)
- 1956 - The Dave Pell Octet Plays Burke & Van Heusen (Kapp, 1956)
- 1957 - Lucky Lucy Ann (Mode, 1957)
