= Neal Hefti =

American jazz trumpeter, composer, and arranger (1922–2008)

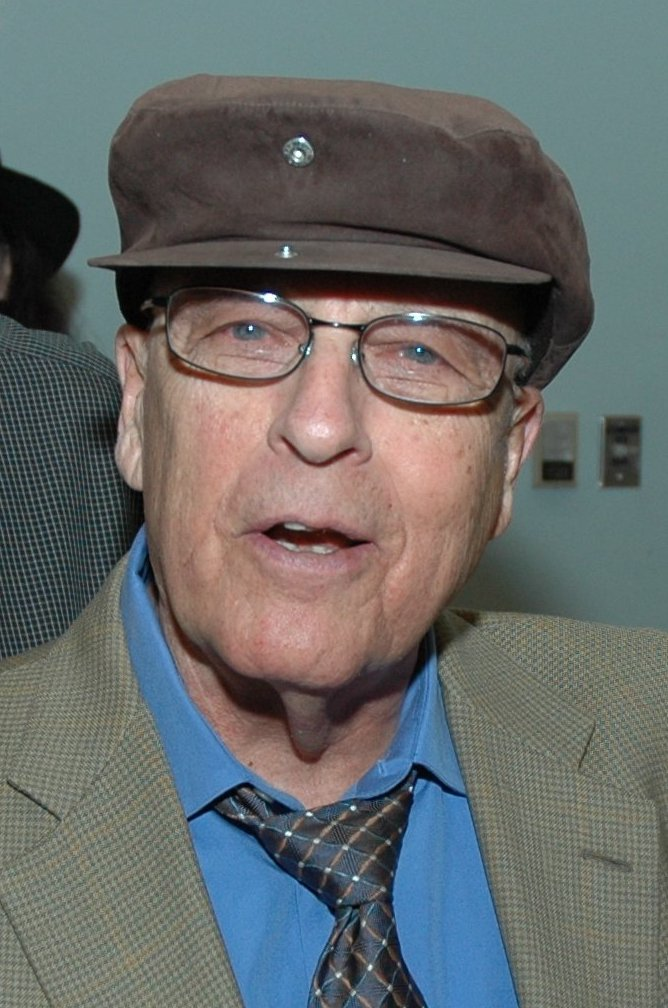

Background information
- Born: Neal Paul Hefti; October 29, 1922; Hastings, Nebraska, U.S.
- Died: October 11, 2008 (aged 85) Toluca Lake, California, U.S.
- Genres: Swing
- Occupations: Musician; composer; arranger
- Instrument: Trumpet
- Formerly of: Charlie Barnet; Count Basie

Neal Paul Hefti (October 29, 1922 – October 11, 2008) was an American jazz trumpeter, composer, and arranger. He wrote music for The Odd Couple movie and TV series and for the Batman TV series.

He began arranging professionally in his teens, when he wrote charts (musical arrangements) for Nat Towles. He composed and arranged while working as a trumpeter for Woody Herman providing the bandleader with versions of "Woodchopper's Ball" and "Blowin' Up a Storm" and composing "The Good Earth" and "Wild Root". He left Herman's band in 1946. Now concentrating on writing music only, he began an association with Count Basie in 1950. Hefti occasionally led his own bands.

== Beginnings ==
Neal Paul Hefti was born October 29, 1922, to an impoverished family in Hastings, Nebraska, United States. He later recalled his family relying on charity when he was a young child. He started playing the trumpet in school at the age of eleven, and by high school was spending his summer vacations playing in local territory bands to help his family make ends meet.

Growing up in, and near Omaha, Hefti was exposed to some of the great bands and trumpeters of the Southwest territory bands. He also was able to see some of the virtuoso jazz musicians from New York who came through Omaha on tour. His early influences all came from the North Omaha scene. He said,

We'd see Basie in town, and I was impressed by Harry Edison and Buck Clayton, being a trumpet player. And I would say I was impressed by Dizzy Gillespie when he was with Cab Calloway. I was impressed by those three trumpet players of the people I saw in person... I thought Harry Edison and Dizzy Gillespie were the most unique of the trumpet players I heard.

These experiences seeing Gillespie and Basie play in Omaha foreshadowed his period in New York watching Gillespie play and develop the music of bebop on 52nd Street and his later involvement with Count Basie's band.

In 1939, while still a junior at North High in Omaha, he got his start in the music industry by writing arrangements of vocal ballads for local bands, like the Nat Towles band. Harold Johnson recalled that Hefti's first scores for that band were "Swingin' On Lennox Avenue" and "More Than You Know," as well as a very popular arrangement of "Anchors Aweigh". Some material that he penned in high school also was used by the Earl Hines band.

Two days before his high school graduation ceremony in 1941, he got an offer to go on tour with the Dick Barry band, so he traveled with them to New Jersey. He quickly was fired from the band after two gigs because he could not sight-read music well enough. Stranded in New Jersey because he did not have enough money to get home to Nebraska, he finally joined Bob Astor's band. Shelly Manne, drummer with Bob Astor at the time, recalled that even then Hefti's writing skills were quite impressive:

We roomed together. And at night we didn't have nothing to do, and we were up at this place — Budd Lake. He said, "What are we going to do tonight?" I said, "Why don't you write a chart for tomorrow?" Neal was so great that he'd just take out the music paper, no score, [hums] — trumpet part, [hums] — trumpet part, [hums] — trombone part, [hums], and you'd play it the next day. It was the end. Cooking charts. I never forget, I couldn't believe it. I kept watching him. It was fantastic.

Hefti, who was classified 4-F (ineligible for military service) during World War II after being hit by a car in New York and breaking his pelvis, would not focus on arranging seriously for a few more years. As a member of Astor's band, he concentrated on playing trumpet.

After an injury forced him to leave Bob Astor, he stayed a while in New York. He played with Bobby Byrne in late 1942, then with Charlie Barnet for whom he wrote the classic arrangement of "Skyliner". During his time in New York, he hung around the clubs on 52nd Street, listening to bebop trumpet master Dizzy Gillespie and other musicians, and immersing himself in the new music. Since he didn't have the money to actually go into the clubs, he would sneak into the kitchen and hang out with the bands, and he got to know many of the great beboppers.

He finally left New York for a while to play with the Les Lieber rhumba band in Cuba. When he returned from Cuba in 1943, he joined the Charlie Spivak band, which led him out to California for the first time, to make a band picture. Hefti fell in love with California. After making the picture in Los Angeles, he dropped out of the Spivak band to stay in California.

== First Herd ==
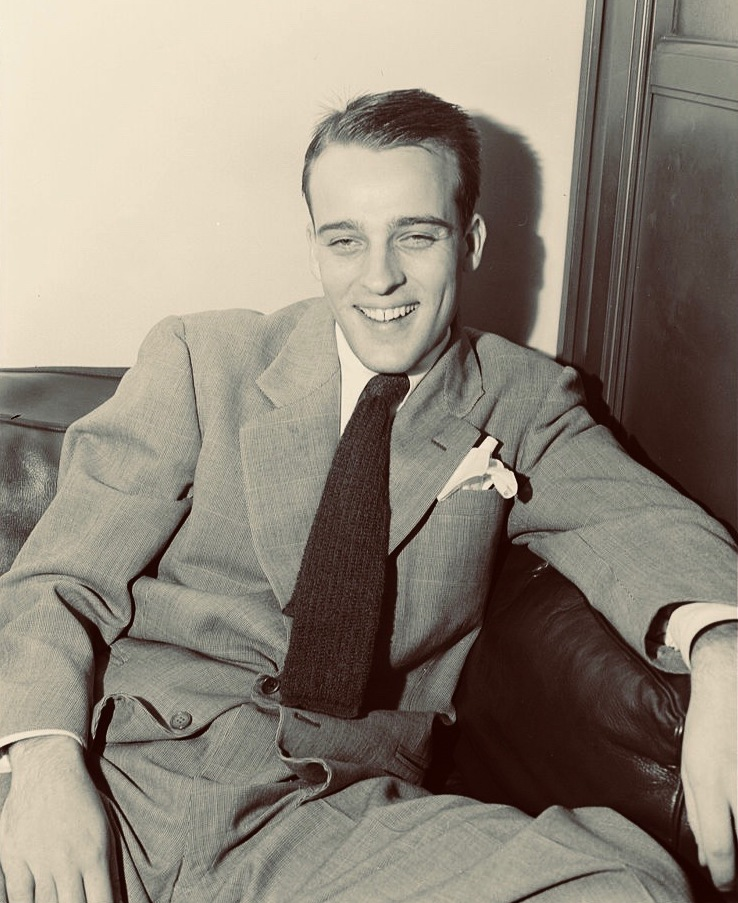
Hefti, New York, c. December 1946

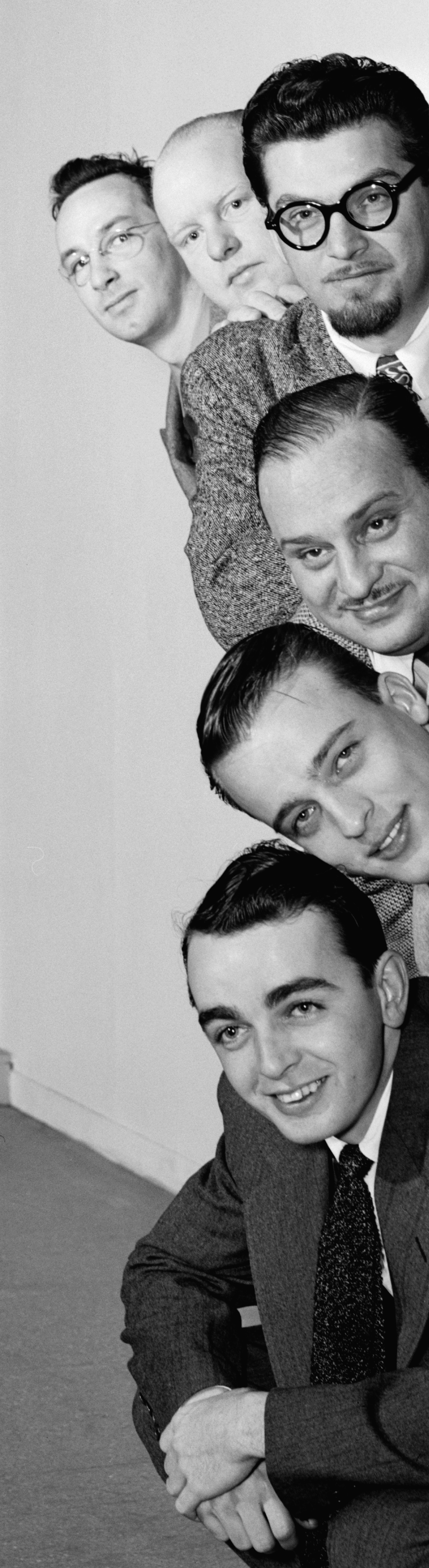
Clockwise from left: Eddie Sauter, Edwin Finckel, George Handy, Johnny Richards, Hefti, and Ralph Burns at the Museum of Modern Art, New York ca. 1947

After playing with Horace Heidt in Los Angeles for a few months in 1944, Hefti met up with Woody Herman who was out in California making a band picture. Hefti then joined Herman's progressive First Herd band as a trumpeter. The Herman band was different from any band that he had played with before. He referred to it as his first experience with a real jazz band. He said:

I would say that I got into jazz when I got into Woody Herman's band because that band was sorta jazz-oriented. They had records. It was the first band I ever joined where the musicians carried records on the road... Duke Ellington records... Woody Herman discs [and] Charlie Barnet V-Discs... That's the first time I sort of got into jazz. The first time I sort of felt that I was anything remotely connected with jazz.

Even though he had been playing with swing bands and other popular music bands for five years, this was the first time he had been immersed in the music of Duke Ellington, and this was the first music that really felt like jazz to him.

One of the first big bands to embrace bebop, First Herd incorporated many bebop ideas in their music. Hefti was instrumental in this development, drawing from his experiences in New York and his respect for Gillespie, who had his own bebop big band. Chubby Jackson, First Herd's bassist, said

Neal started to write some of his ensembles with some of the figures that come from that early bebop thing. We were really one of the first bands outside of Dizzy's big band that flavored bebop into the big band — different tonal quality and rhythms, and the drum feeling started changing, and that I think was really the beginning of it...

I fell in love with it, and I finally got into playing it with the big band because Neal had it down. Neal would write some unique things along those patterns.

During these years with Herman's band, as they started to turn more and more towards bop ideas, Hefti started to turn more of his attention and effort to writing, at which he quickly excelled. He composed and arranged some of First Herd's most popular recordings, including two of the band's finest instrumentals: "Wild Root" and "The Good Earth".

He contributed to the band a refinement of bop trumpet style that reflected his experience with Byrne, Barnet, and Spivak, as well as an unusually imaginative mind, essentially restless on the trumpet, but beautifully grounded on manuscript paper.

He also wrote band favorites such as "Apple Honey" and "Blowin' Up a Storm". His first hand experience in New York, hanging around 52nd Street and listening to the great Dizzy Gillespie, became an important resource to the whole band.

His bebop composition work also started to attract outside attention from other composers, including the interest of neo-classicist Igor Stravinsky, who later wrote "Ebony Concerto" for the band.

What first attracted Stravinsky to Herman was the five trumpet unison on "Caldonia," which mirrored the new music of Gillespie... First it had been [Neal Hefti's] solo on Herman's "Woodchopper's Ball", then it became the property of the whole section, and finally, in this set form, it was made part of [Hefti's] arrangement of "Caldonia."

Hefti's work successfully drew from many sources. As composer, arranger, and as a crucial part of the Herman ensemble, he provided the Herman band with a solid base which led to their popularity and mastery of the big band bebop style.

== Late 1940s ==
While playing with the First Herd, Neal married Herman's vocalist, Frances Wayne. Playing with the band was very enjoyable for Hefti, which made it doubly hard for him to leave when he wanted to pursue arranging and composing full-time. Talking about Herman's band, Hefti said,

The band was a lot of fun. I think there was great rapport between the people in it. And none of us wanted to leave. We were always getting sort of offers from other bands for much more money than we were making with Woody, and it was always like if you left, you were a rat. You were really letting down the team.

The Heftis finally left Woody Herman in late 1946, and Neal began freelance arranging. He wrote charts for Buddy Rich's band, and the ill-fated Billy Butterfield band. He wrote a few arrangements and compositions for George Auld's band, including the composition "Mo Mo." He joined the short-lived Charlie Ventura band as both sideman and arranger (arranging popular songs such as "How High the Moon"). He also arranged for Harry James's bands in the late 1940s.

One of the serendipitous highlights of his work in the late 1940s was the recording of his Cuban-influenced song "Repetition" using a big band and string orchestra, for an anthology collection called The Jazz Scene intended to showcase the best jazz artists around at that time. Hefti had written the piece with no soloist in mind, but Charlie Parker was in the studio while Hefti was recording, heard the arrangement, and asked to be included as soloist. In the liner notes to the original issue, producer Norman Granz wrote:

Parker actually plays on top of the original arrangement: that it gels as well as it does, is a tribute both to the flexible arrangement of Hefti and the inventive genius of Parker to adapt himself to any musical surrounding.

== The Basie years ==
In 1950, Hefti began to arrange for Count Basie and what became known as "The New Testament" band. According to Hefti in a Billboard interview, Basie wanted to develop a stage band that could appear on The Ed Sullivan Show. Although the New Testament band was never a show band, it was much more of an ensemble band than Basie's previous orchestras. Hefti's tight, well-crafted arrangements resulted in a new band identity that was maintained for more than twenty years. In his autobiography, Count Basie recalls their first meeting and the first compositions that Hefti provided the new band:

Neal came by, and we had a talk, and he said he'd just like to put something in the book. Then he came back with "Little Pony" and then "Sure Thing," "Why Not?" and "Fawncy Meeting You," and we ran them down, and that's how we got married.

Hefti's compositions and arrangements featured and recorded by the orchestra established the distinctive, tighter, modern sound of the later Basie. His work was welcomed by both the band and with audiences. Basie said: "There is something of his on each one of those first albums of that new band."

What has become known as The Atomic Mr. Basie was one of the Basie Orchestra's most successful recordings of the 1950s. Formally titled Basie and subtitled "E=MC²=Count Basie Orchestra+Neal Hefti Arrangements," the album features eleven songs composed and arranged by Hefti, including the ballad "Li'l Darlin" and "Splanky," now standards. Also on the album were "The Kid from Red Bank" featuring a gloriously sparse piano solo that was Basie's hallmark, and other songs that quickly became Basie favorites, such as "Flight of the Foo Birds" with Eddie Lockjaw Davis' flying tenor solo, "Fantail" with Frank Wess's soaring alto solo, and the masterpiece ensemble lines of "Teddy the Toad". These pieces are evidence of both Hefti's masterful hand, and the strong ensemble that Count Basie had put together.

During the 1950s, Hefti did not get as much respect as a musician and band leader as he did as composer and arranger. In a 1955 interview, Miles Davis said: "if it weren't for Neal Hefti, the Basie band wouldn't sound as good as it does. But Neal's band can't play those same arrangements nearly as well." This disparity is not so much a reflection of Hefti's ability (or lack thereof) as a musician, as it is a reflection of his focus as a writer. In the liner notes to Atomic Basie, critic Barry Ulanov says:

In a presentation of the Count Basie band notable of its justness, for its attention to all the rich instrumental talent and all the high good taste of this band — in this presentation, not the least of the achievements is the evenness of the manuscript. Neal Hefti has matched — figure for figure, note for note-blower — his talent to the Basie band's, and it comes out, as it should, Basie.

Much the same way that Duke Ellington matched his scores to the unique abilities of his performers, Hefti was able to take advantage of the same kind of 'fine-tuning' to bring out the best of the talents of the Basie band. Therefore, it should come as no surprise that when the same charts are played by a different band, even the composer's own, that the result is not as strong.

As composer, Hefti garnered many accolades. In addition to Ulanov's praise, Hefti won two Grammy awards for his composition work on Atomic Basie including "Li'l Darlin," "Splanky," and "Teddy the Toad." The reception this album gained had Basie and Hefti in the studio six months later making another album. Basie recalled:

That is the one that came out under the title of "Basie Plays Hefti". All the tunes were very musical. That's the way Neal's things were, and those guys in that band always had something to put with whatever you laid in front of them.

Hefti's influence on the Basie sound and his writing for the band was strong enough for Basie to use his talent for arranging even when recording standard jazz tunes with the likes of Frank Sinatra. Basie said,

So we went on out to Los Angeles and did ten tunes in two four-hour sessions [with Frank Sinatra]. All of those tunes were standards, which I'm pretty sure he had recorded before (and had hits on). But this time they had been arranged by Neal Hefti with our instrumentation and voicing in mind.

Again, by matching the individual parts of the arrangements to the abilities of Basie's band, Hefti was able to highlight the ensemble’s characteristic performance style.

Overall, Basie was very impressed with Hefti's charts, but was perhaps too proud to admit the extent of his influence:

I think Neal did a lot of marvelous things for us, because even though what he did was a different thing and not quite the style but sort of a different sound, I think it was quite musical.

== 1950s, 1960s and 1970s ==
Outside of his work for Basie, Hefti led a big band of his own during the 1950s. In 1951, one of these bands featured his wife Frances Wayne on vocals. They recorded and toured off and on with this and other incarnations of this band throughout the 1950s. Although his own band did not attain the same level of success as the bands he arranged for, he did receive a Grammy nomination for his own album Jazz Pops (1962), which included recordings of "Li'l Darlin," "Cute," and "Coral Reef".

Later in the 1950s he abandoned trumpet playing altogether to concentrate on scoring and conducting. He had steady work conducting big bands, backing singers in the studio during recording sessions, and appearing on the television shows of Arthur Godfrey, Kate Smith, and others. He worked with Della Reese to adapt and arrange 12 songs for her 1960 album Della, which was nominated for a Grammy Award.

Hefti moved back to Los Angeles in 1960. Around this time, he began working for the Hollywood film industry and he enjoyed tremendous popular success writing music for film and television. He wrote much background and theme music for motion pictures, including the films Sex and the Single Girl, How to Murder Your Wife (1965), Synanon, Boeing Boeing (1965), Lord Love a Duck (1966), Duel at Diablo (1966), Barefoot in the Park (1967), The Odd Couple (1968), and Harlow (1965), for which he received two Grammy nominations for the song "Girl Talk". While most of his compositions during this period were geared to the demands of the medium and the directors, there were many moments when he was able to infuse his work with echoes of his jazz heritage.

In 1961, Hefti became the chief artists and repertoire representative of Reprise Records. That year, he joined with Frank Sinatra on his Sinatra and Swingin' Brass album, where Hefti was credited as arranger and conductor of the album's 12 cuts.

Also in 1961, Hefti composed a big band arrangement of Sir Edward Elgar's Pomp and Circumstance for Don Everly, who released it under the pseudonym Adrian Kimberly on The Everly Brothers' Calliope Records label.

He also wrote background and theme music for television shows, including Batman and The Odd Couple. He received three Grammy nominations for his television work and received one award for his Batman television score. His Batman title theme, a simple cyclic twelve-bar blues-based theme, became a Top 10 single for The Marketts and later for Hefti himself. His theme for The Odd Couple movie was reprised as part of his score for the television series of the early 1970s, as well as in a more R&B urban style for the 1982 updated version, and a jazzier version for the 2015 updated version. He received two Grammy nominations for his work on The Odd Couple television series.

Following his wife's death in 1978, Hefti gradually withdrew from active music making. In later years, he concentrated on "taking care of my copyrights".

== Death ==
Hefti died of natural causes on October 11, 2008, at his home in Toluca Lake, California, at the age of 85.

== Awards ==
Grammy nominations

- Nomination for Jazz Pops (Li'l Darlin', Cute, Coral Reef) as artist.
- Two awards for Basie, aka Atomic Basie (Li'l Darlin', Splanky, Teddy the Toad) as composer.
- Three nominations (one award) for the Batman TV score.
- Two nominations for the Harlow movie score ("Girl Talk").
- Two nominations for The Odd Couple TV score.

Academy of Television Arts & Sciences

- Nomination for Outstanding Individual Achievement in Music - 1968 "The Fred Astaire Show" as conductor

American Society of Composers, Authors and Publishers

- Jazz Wall of Fame 2005

== Discography ==
=== Albums ===
- Swingin' on Coral Reef (Coral, 1953)
- Clifford Brown with Strings (Verve, 1955)
- Hefti, Hot and Hearty (Epic, 1955)
- Presenting Neal Hefti and His Orchestra (RCA, 1955)
- The Band with Young Ideas (Coral, 1956)
- Concert Miniatures (Vik, 1957)
- Pardon My Doo-Wah (Epic, 1958)
- Hollywood Songbook (Coral, 1958)
- Music USA (Coral, 1959)
- A Salute to the Instruments (Cora, 1960)
- Light and Right (Columbia, 1960)
- Jazz Pops (Reprise, 1962)
- Themes from TV's Top 12 (Reprise, 1962)
- The Leisurely Loveliness of Neal Hefti and His Orchestra / Li'l Darlin (Movietone, 1964) / (20th Century Fox, 1965)
- Sex and The Single Girl soundtrack (Warner Bros., 1964)
- How To Murder Your Wife soundtrack (United Artists, 1965)
- Harlow soundtrack (Columbia, 1965)
- Lord Love a Duck soundtrack (United Artists, 1966)
- Boeing Boeing soundtrack (RCA Victor, 1966)
- Lord Love a Duck soundtrack (United Artists, 1966)
- Duel at Diablo soundtrack (United Artists, 1966)
- Hefti in Gotham City (RCA Victor, 1966)
- Batman Theme & Other Bat Songs (RCA Victor, 1966)
- Batman soundtrack (1966)
- Definitely Hefti! (United Artists, 1967)
- Barefoot in The Park soundtrack (Dot, 1967)
- Oh Dad, Poor Dad, Mama's Hung You in the Closet and I'm Feelin' So Sad (RCA, 1967)
- The Odd Couple soundtrack (Dot, 1968)

As composer and arranger with Count Basie

- The Count! (Clef, 1952 [1955])
- Dance Session (Clef, 1953)
- Dance Session Album#2 (Clef, 1954)
- Basie (Clef, 1954)
- April in Paris (Verve, 1956)
- The Atomic Mr. Basie (Roulette, 1957) aka Basie and E=MC^{2}
- Basie Plays Hefti (Roulette, 1958)
- On My Way & Shoutin' Again! (Verve, 1962)

As composer and arranger with Harry James

- Harry James and His Orchestra 1948–49 (Big Band Landmarks – Vol. X & XI, 1969)
- The New James (Capitol, 1958)
- Harry's Choice (Capitol, 1958)
- Harry James Plays Neal Hefti (MGM, 1961)

=== Film scores ===
- 1964: Sex and the Single Girl
- 1965: Boeing Boeing
- 1965: How to Murder Your Wife
- 1965: Harlow
- 1965: Synanon
- 1966: Lord Love a Duck
- 1966: Duel at Diablo
- 1967: Oh Dad, Poor Dad, Mamma's Hung You in the Closet and I'm Feelin' So Sad
- 1967: Barefoot in the Park
- 1968: The Odd Couple
- 1968: P.J.
- 1971: A New Leaf
- 1972: Last of the Red Hot Lovers
- 1976: Won Ton Ton, the Dog Who Saved Hollywood

== See also ==
- List of jazz arrangers
- List of music arrangers
- Ralph Patt, jazz guitarist who toured with Hefti

== Sources ==
- Frank Alkyer, editor. Downbeat: 60 Years of Jazz. Hal Leonard Corporation, Milwaukee, 1995.
- Count Basie and Albert Murray. Good Morning Blues, the Autobiography of Count Basie. Donald Fine, Inc., New York, 1985.
- Stanley Dance. The World of Count Basie. Charles Scribner's Sons, New York, 1980.
- Ira Gitler. Jazz Masters of the 40s. Da Capo Press, New York, 1983.
- Ira Gitler. Swing to Bop. Oxford University Press, New York, 1985.
- Norman Granz. Album Liner Notes for The Jazz Scene. Verve Records, 1949.
- Kinkle, editor. Complete Encyclopedia of Popular Music and Jazz 1900–1950, volume 2. Arlington House Publishers, Westport, Connecticut, 1974.
- Colin Larkin, editor. Guinness Encyclopedia of Popular Music, volume 3. Guinness Publishing, Enfield, England, 1995.
- Albert McCarthy. Big Band Jazz. G.P. Putnam's Sons, New York, 1974.
- Barry Ulanov. Album Liner Notes for Atomic Basie. Roulette Jazz, 1957.
- Barry Ulanov. A History of Jazz in America. Da Capo Press, New York, 1972.
