= Joe Frank Carollo =

American musician (born 1939)

- Born: September 3, 1939 (age 86); Leland, Mississippi, US
- Instruments: Bass, vocals
- Years active: 1959–present
- Formerly of: Joe Frank and the Knights, The T-Bones, Hamilton, Joe Frank & Reynolds

Joe Frank Carollo (born September 3, 1939) is an American musician. He is best known for leading Joe Frank and the Knights in the 1960s and later on being a part of the collective Hamilton, Joe Frank & Reynolds.

== Biography ==
Carollo was born in Leland, Mississippi. He was the lead singer of The Bobcats in 1959 when he merged the band with another group, The Rollons, and became the rock group Joe Frank and the Knights. They soon became one of the most popular groups in Mississippi, and toured until late 1965 as according to Joe Frank they had "been together since the eighth or ninth grade" and were starting to get most of the band were married and wanted to do new things.

In 1966, The T-Bones, which was actually a collective of members from The Wrecking Crew, had a hit with "No Matter What Shape (Your Stomach's In)" but none of the Crew wanted to tour in the band, and a new lineup including Carollo was made to tour. The lineup included Carollo on bass, Dan Hamilton on guitar, and Tommy Reynolds on keys. The lineup did not play on the hit record and all but one studio album, as they were allowed to record their 1966 album Everyone's Gone To The Moon (And Other Trips).

After The T-Bones disbanded, Carollo teamed up with Hamilton and Reynolds and formed Hamilton, Joe Frank & Reynolds. The group had two hits in the US in the early 1970s, "Don't Pull Your Love" (US #4) and "Fallin' in Love" (US #1). They disbanded in 1976 and returned for a few years in the 1980s.

== Personal life ==
Carollo has been married four times and is now a grandfather. He is the father of composer Joey Newman. His cousin is Joe Correro Jr., a drummer who played with Carollo in Joe Frank and the Knights and later Paul Revere & the Raiders.

Carollo has lived in California since 1965, and currently lives in Agoura Hills with one of his sons.
