= Darlene Remembers Duke, Jonathan Plays Fats =

Studio album by Jo Stafford and Paul Weston
- Released: 1982
- Genre: Traditional pop comedy
- Label: Corinthian Records

Darlene Remembers Duke, Jonathan Plays Fats is a 1982 album by Jo Stafford and Paul Weston in which they perform in character as Jonathan and Darlene Edwards. The duo present their own unique interpretation of the music of Duke Ellington and Fats Waller, with Stafford singing deliberately off-key, and Weston deliberately fumbling his way through piano arrangements. It was issued by Corinthian Records (COR-117). When it was released, Billboard said of it: "The sounds they achieve may well lead to another Grammy for the duo next year." Stafford and Weston, in their Jonathan and Darlene Edwards personas, were interviewed by Los Angeles Magazine following the album's release.

== Track listing ==
Side 1

1. Ain't Misbehavin
2. Sophisticated Lady
3. Honeysuckle Rose
4. I'm Beginning to See the Light
5. I'm Gonna Sit Right Down and Write Myself a Letter
6. Take the "A" Train

Side 2

1. Keepin' Out of Mischief Now
2. Mood Indigo
3. Black and Blue
4. Don't Get Around Much Anymore
5. I've Got a Feeling I'm Falling
6. Do Nothin' til You Hear From Me
