= Bob Astor =

American jazz and dance bandleader and songwriter (born 1915)

Bob Astor (born Robert E. Dade, October 5, 1915, New Orleans) was an American jazz and dance bandleader and songwriter, principally active in the 1940s.

Astor led groups in New Orleans and east Texas before moving to the Los Angeles area at the end of the 1930s. He put together a new ensemble in 1940 in Hermosa Beach, which was, according to big band historian Leo Walker, "perhaps the first West Coast band to feature black musicians". The group toured nationwide and was perhaps more successful in the Eastern US; it also played on radio, including on the program The Fitch Bandwagon. Astor's sidemen included Shelly Manne, Zoot Sims, Les Elgart, Larry Elgart, Illinois Jacquet, Dave Pell, Marty Napoleon, Neal Hefti, Irv Levin, Irv Kluger, and others; Jo Napoleon was a vocalist. He also wrote songs, often as a team with his pianist, George Williams. Astor was in negotiations to record with Decca Records in 1942 when the AFM Musicians' Strike was called; as a result, he never cut any recordings. Astor left conducting soon after and pursued a career as a radio disc jockey in California. In the 1960s he worked as a talent agent for the Shaw Agency in New York, and was involved in the organization of the 1964 American tour of The Beatles.
