= Jonathan and Darlene Edwards in Paris =

Studio album by Jo Stafford and Paul Weston
- Released: 1960
- Genre: Traditional pop comedy
- Label: Columbia (1960); Corinthian Records (1999)

Jonathan and Darlene Edwards in Paris is a 1960 comedy album recorded by American singer Jo Stafford and her husband, pianist and bandleader Paul Weston. In character as Jonathan and Darlene Edwards, the pair put their own interpretation on popular songs including "I Love Paris" and "Paris in the Spring." The album followed a successful comedy act the couple would perform at parties during the 1950s, in which Weston would play an out of tune piano while Stafford would accompany him by singing in an off-key and high pitched voice. A joint winner of the 1961 Grammy Award for Best Comedy Album, the album garnered Stafford her only major award for her singing.

== Background ==
The concept of Jonathan and Darlene Edwards has its roots in an event which occurred at a Columbia Records sales convention where, in order to fill time, Weston put on an impression of a dreadful lounge pianist. His audience responded very positively, and continued to ask for more even after the convention was over. Throughout the 1950s, Stafford and Weston developed the act to entertain guests at parties. The couple would pretend to be a bad lounge act. Stafford would sing off-key in a high pitched voice, while Weston would play an untuned piano off key and with bizarre rhythms. Weston's pseudonym, the name of the Calvinist preacher, was chosen by George Avakian, an executive for Columbia Records, who wanted Weston to record his musical misadventures under that name. The more thought Weston gave to the request, the more unsure he was that he could fill an entire album as Jonathan Edwards alone. He enlisted Stafford, who became Jonathan's wife, Darlene, and the off-key vocalist of the duo.

Stafford made her first recording as Darlene Edwards in 1957 after finding herself with some spare time after a recording session, and those who heard bootlegs of this track gave it a positive reception. Stafford and Weston subsequently recorded an entire album of songs as the Edwardses later that year, entitling it Jo Stafford and Paul Weston Present: The Original Piano Artistry of Jonathan Edwards, Vocals by Darlene Edwards. By way of a publicity stunt, the Westons claimed they had no personal connection to Jonathan and Darlene and that they were a Trenton, New Jersey lounge act whom they had discovered and who happened to live with them. This led to much speculation throughout the United States as people tried to identify the act, with Time Magazine reporting that Margaret and Harry Truman were strong contenders, before identifying the couple in the article. The 1957 album was followed by an album of "pop standards" on which the pair put their own interpretation on popular songs. It proved to be a commercial and critical success, becoming the first commercially successful musical parody album. The Westons brought the Edwardses to television in 1958 for a Jack Benny Shower of Stars, and to The Garry Moore Show in 1960.

Jonathan and Darlene Edwards in Paris was recorded in 1960, and won an award for that year's Grammy Awards for Best Comedy Album. The album "tied" with Bob Newhart's "Spoken Word Comedy" because the Grammys took the unusual decision to issue two comedy awards for 1960. The 1961 award for Best Comedy Album was the only Grammy Stafford ever won.

== Track listing ==
This track listing is sourced from Corinthian Records.

1. "I Love Paris"
2. "Valentina"
3. "Boulevard of Broken Dreams"
4. "La Vie en Rose"
5. "The River Seine"
6. "April in Paris"
7. "The Poor People of Paris"
8. "The Last Time I Saw Paris"
9. "Autumn Leaves"
10. "Paris in the Spring"
11. "Mademoiselle de Paree"
12. "Darling, je vous aime Beaucoup"
