= Jack Perciful =

American jazz musician

Jack T. Perciful (November 26, 1925, Moscow, Idaho – March 13, 2008, Olympia, Washington) was an American jazz pianist.

Perciful learned piano from an early age; his mother was a pianist who played in silent movie houses. After enlisting in the United States Army, he was stationed in Japan, where he played in a military band during 1945-1946. Following his tour of duty, he enrolled at the University of Idaho, obtaining his bachelor's in 1951; following this he played with local ensembles in Los Angeles and Las Vegas. He is best known for his long-term association with Harry James, playing with James from 1957 to 1974 both on record and in tour and festival performances. Other associations include work with Charlie Barnet, Corky Corcoran, and Red Kelly.
