= Dave Pell =

American jazz saxophonist, bandleader, record producer (1925–2017)

David Pell
- Born: February 26, 1925; Brooklyn, New York, U.S.
- Died: May 7, 2017 (aged 92)
- Genres: Jazz
- Occupations: Musician, bandleader
- Instrument: Saxophone
- Years active: 1940s–2017
- Labels: Atlantic, Kapp, Coral, Capitol, RCA Victor, Liberty
- Formerly of: The Dave Pell Octet

David Pell (February 26, 1925 – May 7, 2017) was an American jazz saxophonist, bandleader and record producer. He was best known for leading a cool jazz octet in the 1950s.

== Biography ==
Pell played in his teens with the big bands of Tony Pastor, Bob Astor, and Bobby Sherwood. In the 1940s he moved to California, where he played on Bob Crosby's radio show in 1946 and became a member of Les Brown's band from 1947 to 1955.

In 1953, he began working with his own ensembles, mostly as an octet with Pell on tenor saxophone, another saxophone (either a baritone or an alto), trumpet, trombone, guitar, and a piano-bass-drums rhythm section). Among the octet players were Pepper Adams, Benny Carter, Mel Lewis, Red Mitchell, Marty Paich, Art Pepper and, early his career, John Williams. These ensembles recorded in the 1950s for Atlantic, Kapp, Coral, Capitol, and RCA Victor. Pell also worked as a sideman for Shorty Rogers, Pete Rugolo, Benny Goodman, and Gene Krupa. He produced music in the 1950s and 1960s for Tops, Uni and Liberty; among his credits were singles by Gary Lewis & the Playboys.

In 1961, Pell switched to alto saxophone and clarinet for a tribute album to John Kirby, who led a small group in the 1930s and 1940s.

Pell was the recording session leader for the 1965 hit song "No Matter What Shape (Your Stomach's In)", performed by a group of Los Angeles studio musicians known as The Wrecking Crew but attributed to The T-Bones.

In the 1970s, he assembled the group Prez Conference, a Lester Young tribute ensemble. In the 1980s, he returned to the octet format, and played on and off into the 1990s.

== Personal life ==
Pell had two daughters, Sandra and Suzanne. He died on May 7, 2017, at the age of 92.

== Discography ==
=== As leader ===
- Plays a Gallery of Seldom Heard Tunes by Irving Berlin (Trend, 1953)
- Plays a Folio of Seldom Heard Tunes by Rodgers & Hart (Trend, 1954)
- Rodgers and Hart (London, 1955)
- Jazz & Romantic Places (Atlantic, 1955)
- The Dave Pell Octet Plays Irving Berlin (Kapp, 1956)
- Love Story (Atlantic, 1956)
- Jazz Goes Dancing (RCA Victor, 1956)
- Plays Burke & Van Heusen with Lucy Ann Polk (Kapp, 1956)
- Swingin' in the Ol' Corral (RCA Victor, 1957)
- A Pell of a Time (RCA Victor, 1957)
- The Dave Pell Octet Plays Irving Berlin (Kapp, 1957)
- I Had the Craziest Dream (Capitol, 1957)
- Swingin' School Songs (Coral, 1958)
- Campus Hop Jazz Goes Dancing (RCA Victor, 1958)
- Plays Harry James' Big Band Sounds (PRI, 1960)
- Plays Perez Prado's Big Band Sounds (PRI, 1960)
- Dave Pell Plays Duke Ellington's Big Band Sounds (PRI, 1960)
- The Big Small Bands (Capitol, 1960)
- The Old South Wails (Capitol, 1961)
- Plays Lawrence Welk's Big Band Sounds (double LP) (PRI, 1960)
- I Remember John Kirby (Capitol, 1962)
- Plays Today's Hits in Jazz (Liberty, 1963)
- Jazz Voices In Video (Liberty, 1963)
- Mah-Na-Mah-Na (as "The Dave Pell Singers") (Liberty, 1969)
- Dave Pell's Prez Conference (GNP Crescendo, 1978)
- Dave Pell's Prez Conference in Celebration of Lester Young (Pye, 1980)
- The Dave Pell Octet Plays Again (Fresh Sound, 1984)
- Live at Alfonse's (Headfirst, 1988)
- Love Story (Atlantic, 1992)

=== As sideman ===
With Les Brown

- You're My Everything (Coral, 1951)
- Concert at the Palladium (Coral, 1953)
- Let's Dance (Coral, 1953)
- Invitation (Coral, 1954)
- At the Palladium (Coral, 1955)
- That Sound of Renown (Coral, 1956)
- The Uncollected Les Brown and His Orchestra 1949 Vol. 2 (Hindsight, 1978)

With John Graas

- Jazz Lab 1 (Decca, 1956)
- Jazz Lab 2 (Decca, 1957)
- Westcoast Workshop (Coral, 1975)

With Pete Rugolo

- Music for Hi-Fi Bugs (EmArcy, 1956)
- Out On a Limb (EmArcy, 1957)
- An Adventure in Sound: Reeds in Hi-Fi (Mercury, 1958)
- Rugolo Plays Kenton (Mercury, 1958)

With Mel Tormé

- A Day in the Life of Bonnie and Clyde (Liberty, 1968)
- Mel Tormé's California Suite (Avenue Jazz, 1999)
- Tormé (Verve, 2003)

With others

- Bob Crosby, Instrumentals Never Before On Record (Onward to Yesterday, 1975)
- Alexander Courage, Hot Rod Rumble (Liberty, 1957)
- Sammy Davis Jr., The Wham of Sam (Reprise, 1961)
- Don Fagerquist, Al Viola, Sessions Live (Calliope, 1976)
- The Four Freshmen, Four Freshmen and Five Saxes (Capitol, 1957)
- Jimmy Giuffre, The Jimmy Giuffre Clarinet (Atlantic, 1956)
- Jackie and Roy, Free and Easy! (ABC-Paramount, 1958)
- Ronnie Lang, Modern Jazz (Tops, 1957)
- Ronnie Lang, Ray Sims, Don Fagerquist, The Les Brown All Stars (Capitol, 1955)
- Henry Mancini, Touch of Evil (Challenge, 1988)
- Andy Martin, Live at Capozzoli's (Woofy, 2001)
- Gerry Mulligan, Jam Session! (Green Line, 1990)
- Nicolas Peyrac, Elle Sortait D'Un Drole De Cafe (CBS, 1982)
- Lucy Ann Polk, Lucy Ann Polk With the Dave Pell Octet (Trend, 1954)
- Leith Stevens, Johnny Mandel, Bill Holman, Jazz Themes from Private Hell (Coral, 1986)
- Lawrence Welk, A L'heure Du Champagne (La Nouvelle Génération, 1965)
