= The T-Bones =

American music group

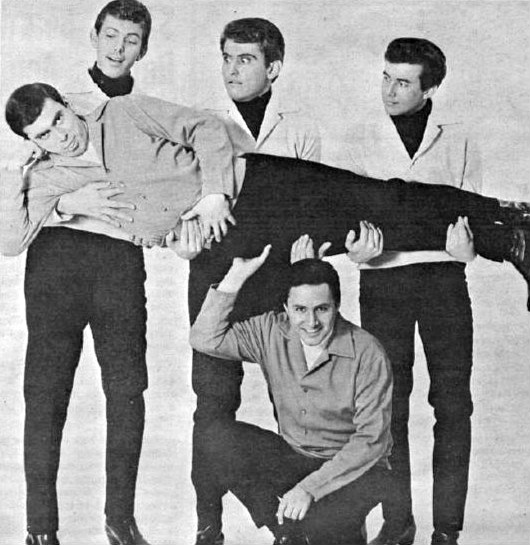
The "public" T-Bones in 1966.

The T-Bones were an American recording group on Liberty Records, existing from 1963 to 1966. The studio recordings of all of their albums except the last one were done by American session musicians, The Wrecking Crew.

They should not be confused with Gary Farr's British mid-1960s band of the same name. In Britain, the name "U.S. T-Bones" was used for the Liberty Records group.

When the T-Bones had a hit in 1966 with the single "No Matter What Shape (Your Stomach's In)", Liberty Records quickly recorded an album of the same name using session musicians from The Wrecking Crew, but those musicians were not willing to go on tour to promote the album as they were making sufficient money doing sessions in Los Angeles. So Liberty created a different "public" T-Bones group to appear on record covers, TV, and in concert. The "public" T-Bones were Judd Hamilton, Dan Hamilton, Joe Frank Carollo, Tommy Reynolds, and Gene Pello. None of them played on the hit record, nor did they play on the next album, Sippin' and Chippin'. However, the "public" T-Bones did record the T-Bones' final album, Everyone's Gone To The Moon (And Other Trips). Dan Hamilton, Joe Frank Carollo, and Tommy Reynolds later formed the 1970s soft rock trio Hamilton, Joe Frank & Reynolds.

"No Matter What Shape (Your Stomach's In)" was based on the melody from a commercial for Alka-Seltzer. The tune reached No. 3 on the Billboard Hot 100, and its follow-up, "Sippin N Chippin", peaked at No. 62; the accompanying album hit No. 75 on the Billboard 200.

== Members, December 26, 1963 ==
Tracks: "Draggin'", "Shut Down", "Boss Drag", "Revv' Buggy", "Hey Little Cobra", "Six Banger"

- Dave Pell - leader
- Steve Douglas - saxophone
- Ervan Coleman - guitar
- Tommy Tedesco - guitar
- Glen Campbell - guitar
- Lyle Ritz -
- M. Ray Pohlman -
- Plas Johnson - saxophone
- Hal Blaine - drums
- Perry Botkin, Jr. -
- Frank Capp -

== Members, December 9, 1965 ==
Tracks: "No Matter What Shape (Your Stomach's In)"; "Chiquita Banana"; "Fever"; "What's In the Bag, Goose"; "Let's Hang On"

- Dave Pell, leader
- Perry Botkin, Jr., OM, arranger
- Tommy Tedesco, guitar
- Victor Feldman
- Hal Blaine, drums
- Julius Wechter, percussion
- Ervan Coleman, guitar
- Buddy Clark
- Carol Kaye, electric bass guitar
- Lyle Ritz, upright bass
- Harold "Lanky" Lindstrot, engineer
- Evelyn Roberts,
- Martin Berman
- Roger Harris, copy
- Robert Ross, copy
- Joe Saraceno, producer

== Members, 1966 ==
- George Dee
- Danny Hamilton - Lead guitar
- Judd Hamilton - Rhythm guitar
- Gene Pello - Drums
- Richard Torres - Organ

Album: Everyone's Gone To The Moon (And Other Trips)

- Joe Frank Carollo — Bass
- Danny Hamilton — Guitar
- Judd Hamilton — Guitar
- Gene Pello — Drums
- Tommy Reynolds — Keyboards / vibraphone / percussion

== Albums ==
- Boss Drag (1964) - Liberty LRP-3346/LST-7346
- Boss Drag at the Beach (1964) - Liberty LRP-3363/LST-7363
- Doin' the Jerk (1965) - Liberty LRP-3404/LST-7404
- No Matter What Shape (Your Stomach's In) (1966) - Liberty LRP-3439/LST-7439
- Sippin' and Chippin' (1966) - Liberty LRP-3446/LST-7446
- Everyone's Gone To The Moon (And Other Trips) (1966) - Liberty LRP-3471/LST-7471
- Shapin' Things Up (1965) - Sunset SUM-1119/SUS-5119
