= Paris in the Spring =

1935 song by Harry Revel and Mack Gordon

Single by Ray Noble and His Orchestra, vocal Al Bowlly
- B-side: Bon Jour Mam'selle
- Released: June 14, 1935
- Recorded: May 10, 1935
- Studio: Victor Trinity Church Studio, Camden, NJ
- Genre: Popular Music, British dance band
- Length: 3:33
- Label: Victor 25040
- Composer(s): Harry Revel
- Lyricist(s): Mack Gordon

"Paris in the Spring" is a popular song composed in 1935, with lyrics by Mack Gordon and music by Harry Revel. It was first introduced by Mary Ellis in the film Paris in Spring. A version was also recorded by Ray Noble and His Orchestra (also in 1935). In 1960, Jo Stafford and her husband Paul Weston recorded a version for their comedy album Jonathan and Darlene Edwards in Paris in which they put their own unique interpretation on the song.

== Notable recordings ==
- Ray Noble (1935)
- Jo Stafford - Jonathan and Darlene Edwards in Paris (1960)
