= No Matter What Shape (Your Stomach's In) =

Single by The T-Bones

from the album No Matter What Shape (Your Stomach's In)
- B-side: Feelin' Fine
- Released: 1965
- Recorded: December 9, 1965
- Genre: Pop, instrumental rock
- Length: 2:15
- Label: Liberty
- Songwriter: Granville Sascha Burland
- Producer: Joe Saraceno

"No Matter What Shape (Your Stomach's In)" is an instrumental composition recorded in 1965 by The T-Bones and released as a single the same year.

== Composer ==
The record itself lists Granville Sascha Burland as the composer, but ASCAP says the composer is Lou Bideu, aka Lew Bedell.

== History ==
In 1965, Dave Pell wanted to record songs based on music from recent television commercials and release them on 45 RPM singles to see if he could get radio airplay and maybe a hit record. Previously, Liberty Records had used "The T-Bones" as a group name for instrumentals recorded by Los Angeles session musicians The Wrecking Crew, and Liberty told Pell to use it again for his project.

In 1965, Pell went into the studio with members of The Wrecking Crew and recorded "No Matter What Shape (Your Stomach's In)," a song based on music used in an Alka-Seltzer television commercial.

When the single became a hit, Liberty Records needed the T-Bones to go on the road to promote it, but the original session musicians were not willing to go. They were making a considerable amount of money doing sessions in Los Angeles. So Liberty created a different "public" T-Bones group to appear on record covers, television, and in concert. The "public" T-Bones were Judd Hamilton, Dan Hamilton, Joe Frank Carollo, Tommy Reynolds, and Gene Pello. None of them played on the hit record but later Dan Hamilton, Carollo and Reynolds would achieve fame as the soft rock trio Hamilton, Joe Frank & Reynolds.

== Chart performance ==
The single spent 13 weeks on the Billboard Hot 100, reaching No. 3, while reaching No. 1 on Canada's RPM Play Sheet. The album spent seven weeks on Billboard's chart of Top LPs, reaching No. 75.

== Personnel ==
- Dave Pell, leader
- Perry Botkin, Jr., OM, arranger
- Tommy Tedesco, guitar
- Victor Fledman [sic], presumably Victor Feldman
- Hal Blaine, drums
- Julius Wechter, percussion
- Ervan Coleman,
- Buddy Clark
- Carol Kaye, electric bass guitar
- Lyle Ritz, upright bass
- Harold "Lanky" Lindstrot, engineer
- Evelyn Roberts
- Martin Berman
- Roger Harris, copy
- Robert Ross, copy
- Joe Saraceno, producer
