= Ray Sims =

American jazz trombonist (1921–2000)

Ray C. Sims (January 18, 1921 – March 14, 2000) was an American jazz trombonist. He was the brother of saxophonist Zoot Sims.

Born in Wichita, Kansas, Sims played in territory bands in the early 1940s, then recorded with Anita O'Day and Benny Goodman shortly after the end of World War II. He worked with Les Brown (1947–1957) and Dave Pell (1953–1957), then with Harry James (1957–1969), and also worked as a sideman in the late 1950s with Charlie Barnet, Bill Holman, and Red Norvo. In the 1970s he played with James again and with Corky Corcoran; near the end of the decade he recorded with his brother, Zoot.
