= Jonathan and Darlene Edwards =

Musical comedy double act

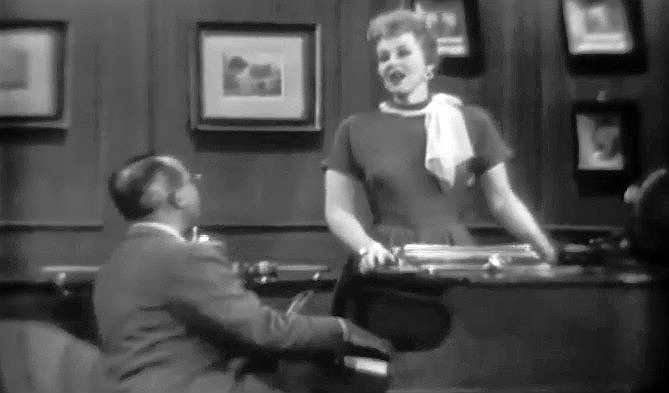
- Paul Weston and Jo Stafford performing as Jonathan and Darlene Edwards in 1958
- Notable work: Jonathan and Darlene Edwards in Paris

Comedy career
- Years active: 1957–1982
- Medium: Music, television
- Genres: Musical comedy, outsider music

Jonathan and Darlene Edwards were a musical comedy double act developed by American conductor and arranger Paul Weston ( March 12, 1912 – September 20, 1996), and his wife, singer Jo Stafford (November 12, 1917 – July 16, 2008). The routine was conceived in the 1950s, and involved Weston playing songs on the piano in unconventional rhythms, while Stafford sang off-key in a high pitched voice. The couple released five albums and one single as the Edwardses, and their 1960 album, Jonathan and Darlene Edwards in Paris won that year's Grammy Award for Best Comedy Album.

Weston first assumed the role of a bad lounge pianist in the mid-1950s, as a way of entertaining guests at Hollywood parties, but was urged to record an album of songs in the unconventional style after giving an impromptu performance in 1956. At the time, he was working for Columbia Records, and after hearing Weston's rendition of "Stardust" at a sales convention in Key West, Florida, Columbia executives George Avakian and Irving Townsend encouraged him to record an album of similar tracks. Avakian named Weston's character Jonathan Edwards after the 18th century Calvinist preacher of the same name and asked him to record under that alias, but fearing he would not have enough material to record a full album, Weston asked his wife to join the project. Stafford, a classically trained singer with the ability to sing both in and out of tune, readily agreed, and named her character Darlene Edwards.

Their first album, The Piano Artistry of Jonathan Edwards was released in 1957, but Weston and Stafford did not admit to being behind the act until Time magazine identified them in an article in September 1957. The Jonathan and Darlene Edwards act won the couple many fans, including some among their show business peers such as the pianist George Shearing, but their 1979 cover of the Bee Gees' "Stayin' Alive" was disliked by the band. Their final album, Darlene Remembers Duke, Jonathan Plays Fats was released in 1982.

== History ==
Paul Weston and Jo Stafford enjoyed successful careers as musicians from the 1930s; Weston as an arranger and conductor, and Stafford as a singer. She performed both as a member of the group The Pied Pipers and as a solo artist, with many of her solo hits backed by Weston's orchestra. Stafford was very comfortable working with Weston, and the couple became romantically involved in the mid 1940s. They married in 1952, and continued to collaborate on recordings.

Weston began his impression of an unskilled pianist in or around 1955, assuming the guise "when things got a little quiet, or when people began taking themselves too seriously at a Hollywood party." One person who particularly enjoyed the act on these occasions was Dean Martin's wife Jeanne, who would ask Weston to "do that silly thing you do". He put on an impromptu performance of the act the following year at a Columbia Records sales convention in Key West, Florida, after hearing a particularly bad hotel pianist. The audience was very appreciative of his rendition of "Stardust", particularly Columbia executives George Avakian and Irving Townsend, who encouraged Weston to make an album of such songs. Inspired by the pianist Roger Williams, who shared his name with the 17th century theologian from Rhode Island, Avakian suggested naming Weston's character after Jonathan Edwards, a Calvinist preacher from the 18th Century. Weston worried that he might not be able to find enough material for an entire album, and he asked his wife to join the project. Stafford—who had previously recorded comedy songs under the name Cinderella G. Stump—readily agreed, and named her off-key vocalist persona Darlene Edwards.

Stafford's creation of Darlene Edwards had its roots in the novelty songs that Mitch Miller, the head of Columbia's artists and repertoire department, had been selecting for her to sing. These included songs such as "Underneath the Overpass", which she felt obliged to record because Columbia was paying for her studio time. However, because she did not agree with Miller's music choices for her, Stafford and her studio musicians often recorded their own renditions of the music, performing the songs according to their feelings about them. Because she had some unused studio time at a 1957 recording session, as a joke Stafford recorded a track as Darlene Edwards. Those who heard bootlegs of the recording responded positively, and later that year, Stafford and Weston recorded an album of songs as Jonathan and Darlene, entitled The Piano Artistry of Jonathan Edwards. The couple had to replace the drummer for the album because the musician they had initially hired laughed until he cried, making it impossible to get a decent take.

When the album was released, former Pied Pipers member and Los Angeles-based radio personality Dick Whittinghill told his listeners that Darlene Edwards was the best female singer he'd ever heard, then played one of the tracks—"It's Magic". Afterwards, people contacted him to say "We have trusted you all these years, all our lives. This woman is terrible, how can we ever believe in you again?". Others said they had to stop driving because they were afraid to do so while she was singing. As a publicity stunt, Weston and Stafford claimed that Jonathan and Darlene Edwards were a New Jersey lounge act which they had discovered, and denied any personal connection. This ruse led to much speculation about the Edwards' identities. In an article titled Two Right Hands in September 1957, Time magazine reported that some people believed the performers were Harry and Margaret Truman, but the same piece identified Weston and Stafford as the Edwardses.

Even after Stafford and Weston were identified as the Edwardses, some people remained unaware of it. Paul Weston once played golf with the head of a major corporation; somehow the small talk during the game came around to an album the executive had purchased during a New York visit. The man said he had purchased Jonathan and Darlene Edwards in Paris and asked Weston if he had ever heard of the record. Weston thought it was a joke until the man said, "He's pretty good, but I don't think she's all that hot."

== Media appearances ==
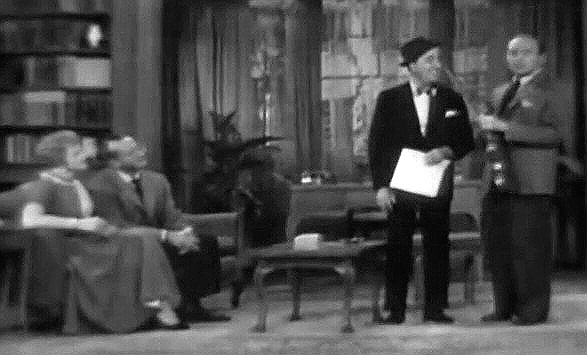
Jack Benny tries to pitch his song. Pictured here are the Westons, Ed Wynn and Benny

Weston and Stafford appeared on television twice as Jonathan and Darlene Edwards. In 1958, they were guests on Jack Benny's television program Shower of Stars, and in 1960 on The Garry Moore Show. Their appearance on Benny's show involved a sketch in which they played the roles of the Edwards to avoid recording a song Benny had written titled "When You Say I Beg Your Pardon, Then I'll Come Back To You". Their young son, Tim, was in the audience for the program, but as a fan of Benny's, he became very upset with his parents for playing what he perceived to be a trick on him. He refused to go home with his parents after the show, telling them, "Mr. Benny's a nice man and you played a terrible trick on him".

The Piano Artistry of Jonathan Edwards was followed up with an album of popular music standards, Jonathan and Darlene Edwards in Paris, which was released in 1960 and won that year's Grammy Award for Best Comedy Album. The Academy issued two awards for the category that year; Bob Newhart also received an award for "Spoken Word Comedy" for his album The Button-Down Mind Strikes Back! The Grammy was Stafford's only major award.

The couple continued to release comedy albums for several years, and in 1979 released a cover of the Bee Gees' "Stayin' Alive" as a single, with an Edwards interpretation of Helen Reddy's "I Am Woman" as its "B" side. The same year also saw a brief resurgence in the popularity of Jonathan and Darlene albums when their cover of "Carioca" was featured as the opening and closing theme to The Kentucky Fried Movie. Their last release, Darlene Remembers Duke, Jonathan Plays Fats, was issued in 1982. To mark the occasion, an interview with Stafford and Weston—in which they assumed the persona of the Edwards—appeared in the December 1982 edition of Los Angeles Magazine.

Weston and Stafford gave a second in-character interview in 1983 to Bob Claster, host of Bob Claster's Funny Stuff on Santa Monica's KCRW. In that program, Weston suggested a future project could involve an album of opera standards, while Stafford said she would like to record what she termed "art songs" like "Pale Hands I Loved" and "Indian Love Call".

== Characterization ==
Both Weston and Stafford went on to develop the characters of Jonathan and Darlene Edwards, until they almost took on a life of their own. In their autobiography, Stafford writes, "It's interesting to note that to Paul and me Jonathan and Darlene became third person people. I found myself referring to Darlene as being real, substantial, an alter ego." The couple also developed a back story for the Edwardses. "[We] got a kind of mental picture of Jonathan and Darlene and we even found out where they came from and where they lived. And I got the idea for the name Darlene, which I thought fit the character beautifully. This was fleshed out in the in-character interviews they gave in the 1980s. They told Bob Claster Jonathan and Darlene's first meeting had occurred in a cocktail bar in Trenton, New Jersey, where Jonathan was playing piano. Romance blossomed after Darlene came in with "a society crowd", and introduced herself. Darlene would sometimes sing at their bridge club before playing cards, occasionally accompanied by someone on piano, but more often a-cappella. She did not begin singing professionally until her children left home. As the Edwardses they claimed to have been the Westons' house guests for the past 25 years, but were overshadowed by the couple, who would send them off into the bedroom whenever people from the media called.

Jonathan said Darlene initially was against performing "Stayin' Alive" because the words were too fast, and that she was breathless many times in the studio. He was pleased that she had been able to complete the recording, "because a lot of young people now will know what the words are". Darlene declared the song really was not her style, but was happy with the result because Jonathan was. She admitted that the couple liked to stay on top of things and wanted to do something that was "now".

Darlene described Jonathan as rigid and the one who set the tempo for the couple's songs. She continued, "When he hits that tempo, you'd better just go along because that's the way it's going to be."

When Will Friedwald asked Paul Weston what Jonathan Edwards was really like, Weston's reply was, "He's a pain in the ass!" In character he claimed to be "very imaginative on all three elements of music—melody, harmony and rhythm", and that people had compared him to Liberace and Carmen Cavallaro. He said he studied music at Pittsfield High School in Massachusetts but was mainly self-taught. Edwards was an avid reader of Etude Magazine as a youngster; the piano lessons his mother arranged for him ended badly because the teacher did not like his adventurous nature.

Of her persona, Stafford wrote, "Darlene may not be a terrific singer, but she's certainly not a clown. She would have fairly good taste, maybe a little flamboyant, maybe a little Helen Hokinson, maybe some flowered voile, but she would never be ridiculous." Asked by Claster who had influenced her singing style, Darlene said she tried to stay as uninfluenced as possible, and did not listen to any other singers. She wished to be remembered as "a sophisticated songstress who really searched them out."

== Critical acclaim ==
In their guise of Jonathan and Darlene Edwards, Weston and Stafford earned admiration from their show business peers. The pianist George Shearing was a fan and would play "Autumn in New York" in the style of Jonathan Edwards if he knew the couple were in the audience. Ray Charles also enjoyed their performance. Art Carney—who played Ed Norton in the comedy series The Honeymooners—once wrote the Edwards a fan letter as Norton. In somewhat of a tongue-in-cheek review, the music journalist Leonard Feather gave The Piano Artistry of Jonathan Edwards a rating of 48 stars—one for each of the then 48 States of the Union. After hearing their recording of "Stayin' Alive", the disc jockey Dr. Demento played it alongside other disco tracks of the day on his show. Their final album, Darlene Remembers Duke, Jonathan Plays Fats received a positive review from Billboard upon its release in 1982, their reviewer saying, "the sounds they achieve may well lead to another Grammy for the duo next year." However, not everybody appreciated the Edwards' take on music. Mitch Miller blamed the couple's 1962 album Sing Along With Jonathan and Darlene Edwards for ending his sing-along albums and television show, while in 2003, Stafford told Michael Feinstein that the Bee Gees had disliked the Edwards' version of "Stayin' Alive".

== Discography ==
=== Albums ===
- The Piano Artistry of Jonathan Edwards (Columbia, 1957)
- Jonathan and Darlene Edwards in Paris (Columbia, 1960)
- Sing Along with Jonathan and Darlene Edwards (RCA Victor, 1962)
- Songs for Sheiks and Flappers (Dot, 1967)
- Darlene Remembers Duke, Jonathan Plays Fats (Corinthian, 1982)
- Jonathan and Darlene's Greatest Hits (Corinthian, 1993)

=== Singles ===
- "Nola"/"It's Magic" (1957)
- "Stayin' Alive"/"I Am Woman" (1979)
