= Corky Corcoran =

American jazz musician

- Born: Gene Patrick Corcoran; July 28, 1924; Tacoma, Washington, U.S.
- Died: October 3, 1979 (aged 55) Tacoma, Washington, U.S.
- Genres: Jazz
- Instruments: Tenor saxophone

Gene Patrick "Corky" Corcoran (July 28, 1924 – October 3, 1979) was an American jazz tenor saxophonist.

== Early life ==
Corcoran was born in Tacoma, Washington. Considered a child prodigy, he began performing in bands at the age of 16.

== Career ==
Corcoran first played professionally in 1940 with Sonny Dunham, then joined Harry James's ensemble for from 1941 to 1947. He left James for a short time, playing with his own ensemble and working briefly in Tommy Dorsey's band before rejoining James in 1949. He continued to work with James until 1957, and also played concurrently with his own ensembles. In 1962, he once again began working with James, an association that would continue almost to Corcoran's death.

== Personal life ==
Corcoran died in October 3, 1979 at St. Joseph's Hospital in Tacoma, Washington.
