= Harry James =

American trumpeter, big band leader (1916–1983)

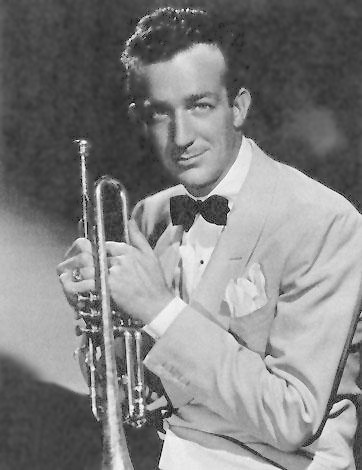
- James, c. 1942
- Born: Harry Haag James; March 15, 1916; Albany, Georgia, U.S.
- Died: July 5, 1983 (aged 67); Las Vegas, Nevada, U.S.
- Spouses: Louise Tobin (m. 1935; div. 1943) Betty Grable (m. 1943; div. 1965) Joan Boyd (m. 1967; div. 1970)
- Children: 5
- Musical career
- Genres: Jazz; big band; swing
- Occupations: Musician; bandleader; trumpeter
- Instrument: Trumpet
- Years active: 1933–1983
- Labels: Brunswick; Columbia; Capitol; MGM; Dot

Harry Haag James (March 15, 1916 – July 5, 1983) was an American musician who is best known as a trumpet-playing band leader who led a big band to great commercial success from 1939 to 1946. He broke up his band for a short period in 1947, but shortly after he reorganized and was active again with his band from then until his death in 1983. He was especially known among musicians for his technical proficiency as well as his tone, and was influential on new trumpet players from the late 1930s into the 1940s. He was also an actor in a number of films that usually featured his band.

== Early life ==
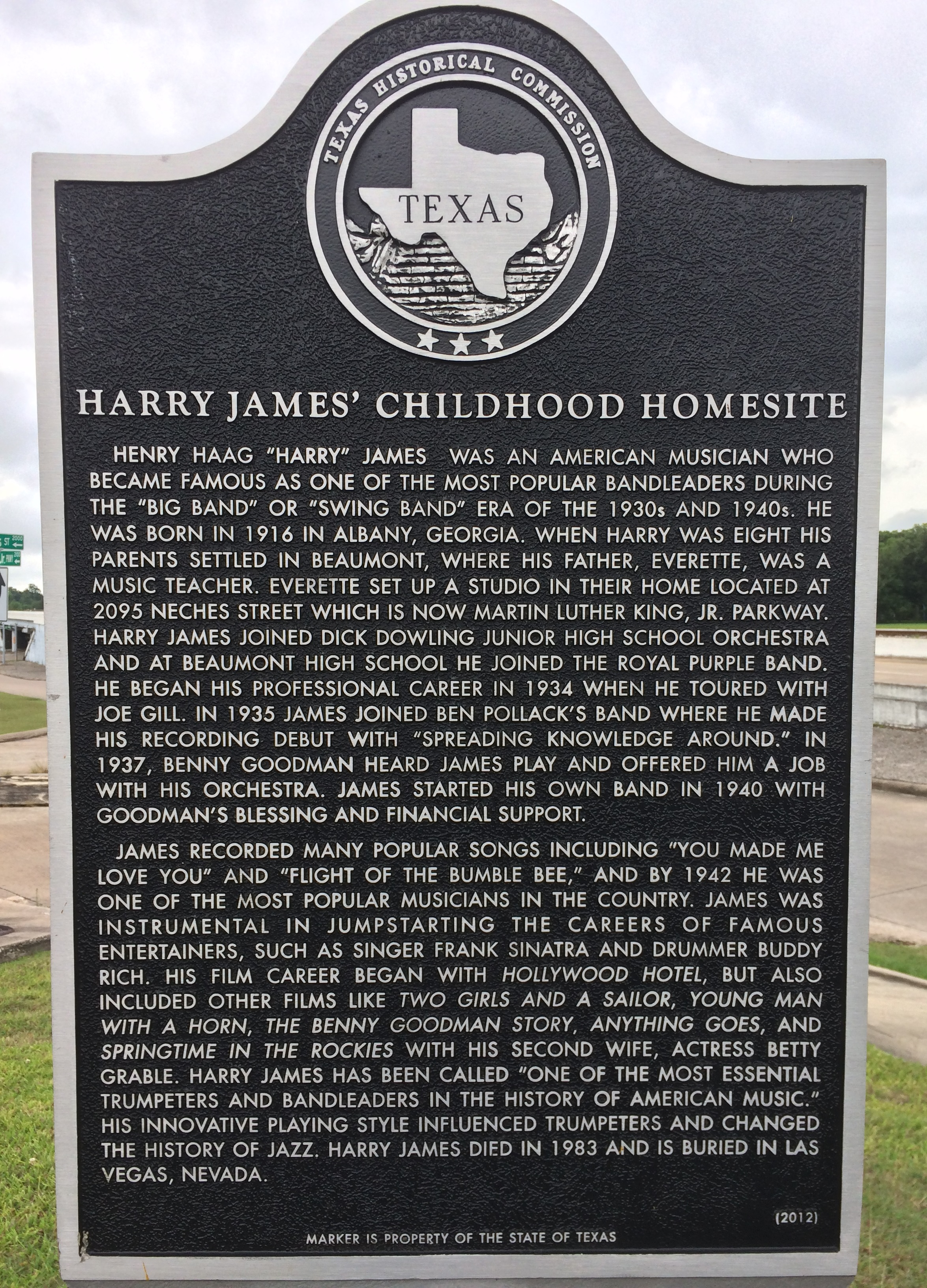
Texas Historical Commission's marker at the childhood homesite of Harry James in Beaumont, Texas.

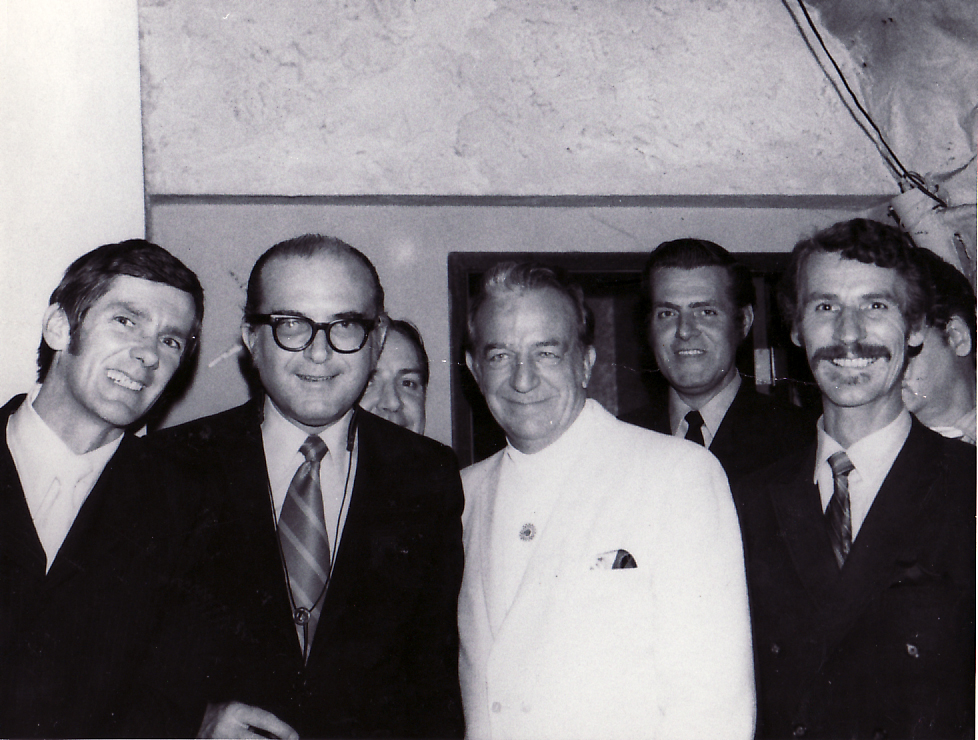
From left: Stan "Cuddles" Johnson, Fraser MacPherson, Bob Smith, Harry James, Al Johnson, Stew Barnett. (The Cave Supper Club, May 1970)

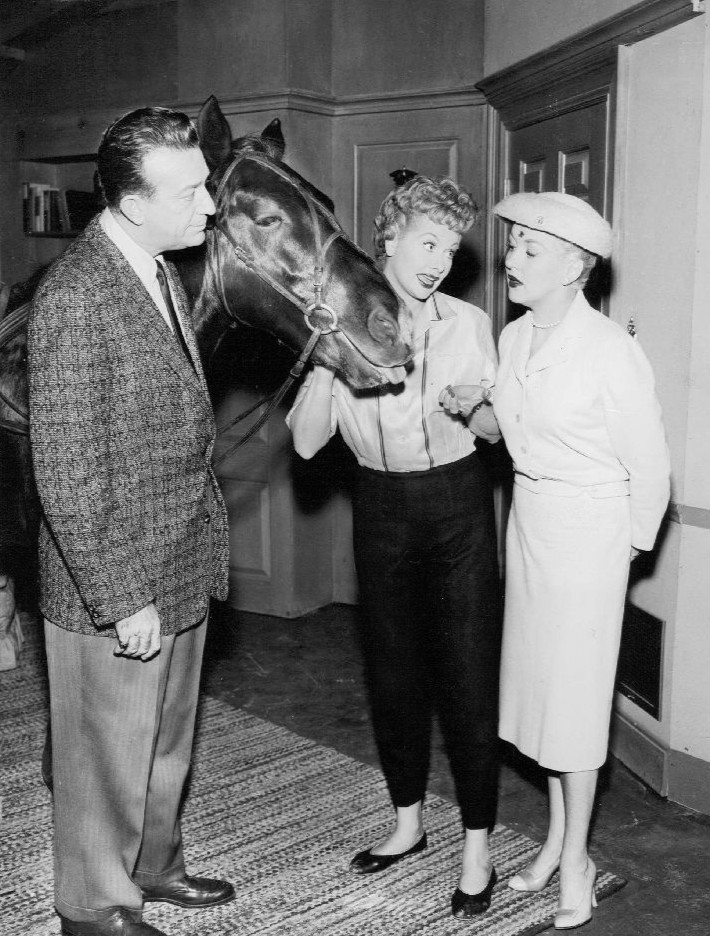
From left: Harry James, Lucille Ball, Betty Grable. (The Lucille Ball-Desi Arnaz Show, 1958)

James was born in Albany, Georgia, United States, the son of Everett Robert James, a bandleader in a traveling circus, the Mighty Haag Circus, and Myrtle Maybelle (Stewart), an acrobat and horseback rider. He started performing with the circus at an early age, first as a contortionist at the age of four, then playing the snare drum in the band from about the age of six. It was at this age that James was almost trampled by the circus trick horses after he wandered onto the circus track as they were performing their stunts, but he was protected by his mother's pet horse, who stood over him until the other horses rushed by.

James started taking trumpet lessons from his father at age eight, and by age twelve he was leading the second band in the Christy Brothers Circus, for which his family was then working. James's father placed him on a strict daily practice schedule. At each session he was given several pages to learn from the Arban's book and was not allowed to pursue any other pastime until he had learned them. In 1924, his family settled in Beaumont, Texas. It was here in the early 1930s that James began playing in local dance bands when he was 15 years of age. While still a student at Dick Dowling Junior High School, he participated as a regular member of Beaumont High School's Royal Purple Band, and in May 1931 he took first place as trumpet soloist at the Texas Band Teacher's Association's Annual Eastern Division contest held in Temple, Texas.

== Career ==
James's first job was playing at the Peabody Hotel in Memphis and he played regularly with Herman Waldman's band, and at one performance was noticed by nationally popular Ben Pollack. In 1935 he joined Pollack's band, but left at the start of 1937 to join Benny Goodman's orchestra, where he stayed through 1938. He was nicknamed "The Hawk" early in his career for his ability to sight-read. A common joke was that if a fly landed on his written music, Harry James would play it. His low range had a warmth associated with the cornet and even the flugelhorn, but this sound was underrecorded in favor of James' brilliant high register.

With financial backing from Goodman, James debuted his own big band in Philadelphia, Pennsylvania, in January 1939, but it didn't click until adding a string section in 1941. Subsequently, known as Harry James and His Music Makers, it produced the hit "You Made Me Love You", which peaked at no. 5 on Billboard's National Best Selling Retail Records chart for the week ending November 18, 1941. During its 18-week chart run, the single spent ten non-consecutive weeks in the Top Ten, from early November 1941 until late January 1942. He and his band appeared in four Hollywood films: Private Buckaroo and Springtime in the Rockies (both 1942), Two Girls and a Sailor (1944), and Best Foot Forward (1943). James toured with the band into the 1980s, and as of July 2018 the Harry James Orchestra, led by Fred Radke, was still very much in business.

=== Bandleader ===
James' band was the first high-profile orchestra to feature vocalist Frank Sinatra, who signed a one-year, $75 a week contract with it in 1939 ($1,589 a week in 2022). James wanted to change Sinatra's name to 'Frankie Satin', but the singer refused. Sinatra only worked seven months before leaving to join Tommy Dorsey's outfit. The James band's featured female vocalist was Helen Forrest, and his later band included drummer Buddy Rich and bassist Thurman Teague. Johnny MacAfee was featured on the sax and vocals, and Corky Corcoran was a youthful sax prodigy.

==== Radio ====
James' orchestra succeeded Glenn Miller's on a program sponsored by Chesterfield Cigarettes in 1942, when Miller disbanded his orchestra to enter the Army. In 1945, James and his orchestra had a summer replacement program for Danny Kaye's program on CBS. He also led the orchestra for Call for Music, which was broadcast on CBS February 13, 1948 – April 16, 1948, and on NBC April 20, 1948 – June 29, 1948.

==== Film ====
James recorded many popular records and appeared in many Hollywood movies. He featured in the 1942 musical short Trumpet Serenade. He played trumpet in the 1950 film Young Man with a Horn, dubbing Kirk Douglas. The album from the movie charted at #1, with James backing big band singer and actress Doris Day. James's recording of "I'm Beginning to See the Light" appears in the motion picture My Dog Skip (2000). His music is also featured in the Woody Allen film Hannah and Her Sisters. James's recording of "It's Been a Long, Long Time" is featured in Captain America: The Winter Soldier and in Marvel's Avengers: Endgame.

== Musical style and reception ==
=== Influences ===
With James's childhood spent as a musician in a traveling circus, he picked up a flamboyant style that utilized such techniques as heavy vibrato, half valve and lip glissandi, valve and lip trills, and valve tremolos. These techniques were popular at the time in what was known as "hot" jazz, epitomized by James's idol Louis Armstrong, but somewhat fell out of favor by the 1950s with the advent of "cool" jazz. James's rigorous regime of practice as a child resulted in an exceptional technical proficiency in the more classical techniques of range, fingering and tonguing. Growing up in the South, James was also exposed to blues music, which had an additional influence on his style. As James explained, "I was brought up in Texas with the blues – when I was eleven or twelve years old down in what they call 'barbecue row' I used to sit in with the guys that had the broken bottlenecks on their guitars, playing the blues; that's all we knew." After hearing James solo on several numbers at a Benny Goodman one-nighter, Armstrong enthused to his friend and Goodman vibraphonist Lionel Hampton, "That white boy – he plays like a jig!"

=== Move towards pop ===
After James left Benny Goodman's band in 1939 to form his own band, he soon found that leading a commercially viable musical group required a broader set of skills than those needed to be a gifted musician playing in someone else's band. The James band ran into financial trouble, and it became increasingly difficult for James to pay salaries and keep the band together. In 1940, James lost his contract with Columbia Records (he returned in 1941), and Frank Sinatra left the band that January. It was not long after this that James made a pivotal decision: he would adopt a "sweeter" style that added strings to the band, and the band would deliver tunes that were in more of a "pop" vein and less true to its jazz roots. From a commercial standpoint, the decision paid off, as James soon enjoyed a string of chart-topping hits that provided commercial success for him and his band. Indeed, a U.S. Treasury report released in 1945 listed Harry James and Betty Grable as the highest-paid couple in the nation.

While James remained commercially successful and personally committed to his music, some critics sought to find fault. In Peter Levinson's 1999 biography, Dan Morgenstern, the respected critic and Director of the Institute of Jazz Studies, called the 1941 release of the later Grammy Hall of Fame inducted "You Made Me Love You" "the record that the jazz critics never forgave Harry James for recording." With James continuing to employ his flamboyant style on pop hits through the 1940s, his playing was often labeled as "schmaltzy" and dismissed by the critics, although radio discs from this period reveal James's continued commitment to jazz. James's jazz releases during this period, while not as numerous, include a variety of modern arrangements from Neal Hefti, Frank Devenport, Johnny Richards and Jimmy Mundy that often inspired his musicians, and as bop surpassed swing by the late 1940s, James was surprisingly open to its influence.

=== Return to Big Band jazz ===
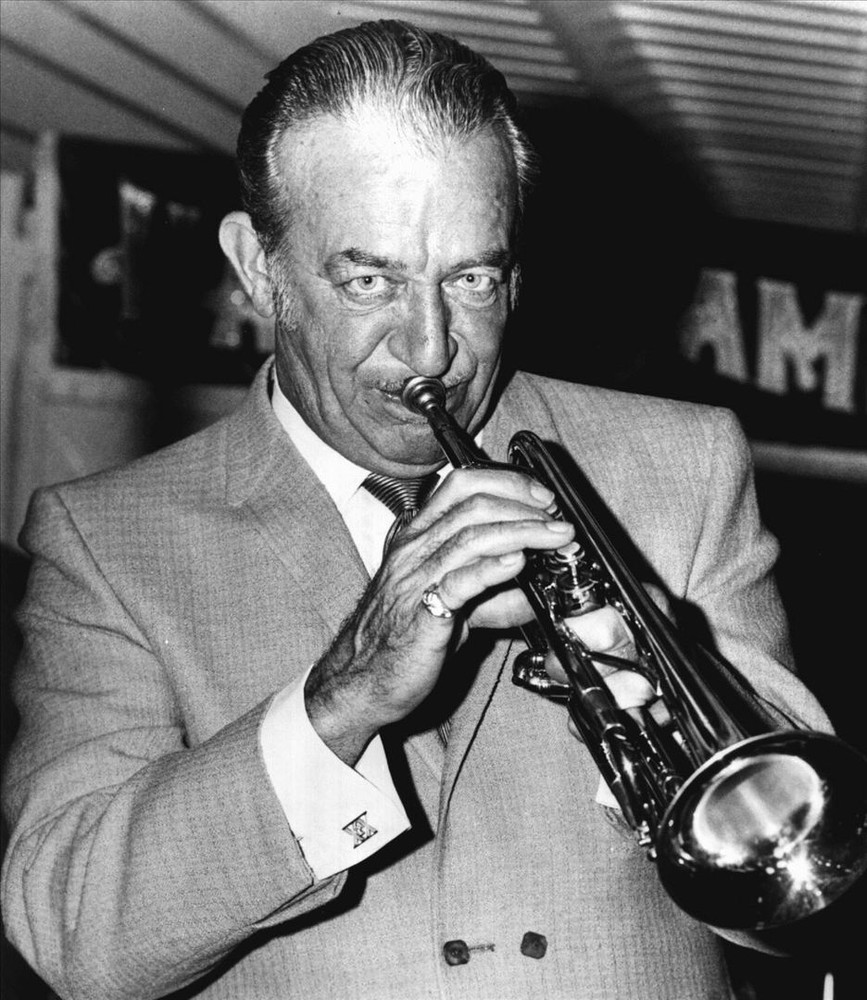
Publicity photo of James, photo by Richard C. Maher c. 1975

After coasting through the mid-1950s, James made a complete reevaluation of where he was heading in his musical career. Count Basie provided the impetus by making a significant comeback with his newly formed "16 Men Swinging" band, and James wanted a band with a decided Basie flavor. James signed with Capitol Records in 1955, and two years later, after releasing new studio versions of many of his previously released songs from Columbia Records, James recorded ten new tracks for an album entitled Wild About Harry!. This album was the first in a series released on Capitol, and continuing later on MGM, representative of the Basie style that James adopted during this period, with some of the arrangements provided by former Basie saxophonist and arranger Ernie Wilkins, whom James hired for his own band.

While James never completely regained favor with jazz critics during his lifetime in spite of his return to more jazz-oriented releases in the late 1950s and into the 1960s, contemporary opinion of his work has shifted. Recent reissues such as Capitol's 2012 7-disc set The Capitol Vaults Jazz Series: Gene Krupa and Harry James have prompted new, more favorable analyses. In 2014, Marc Myers of JazzWax commented, "[James's] band of the mid-1940s was more modern than most of the majors, and in 1949 he led one of the finest bands of the year." And on James's releases from 1958 to 1961, Myers noted, "The James band during this period has been eclipsed by bands led by Basie, Maynard Ferguson and Stan Kenton. While each served up its own brand of magnificence, James produced more consistently brilliant tracks than the others... virtually everything James recorded during this period was an uncompromising, swinging gem."

James felt strongly about the music he both played and recorded. In 1972 while in London, he did an interview with the English jazz critic Steve Voce, who asked if the biggest audience was for the commercial numbers he had recorded. James visibly bristled, replying, "That would depend on for whom you are playing. If you're playing for a jazz audience, I'm pretty sure that some of the jazz things we do would be a lot more popular than 'Sleepy Lagoon,' and if we're playing at a country club or playing Vegas, in which we have many, many types of people, then I'm sure that 'Sleepy Lagoon' would be more popular at that particular time. But I really get bugged about these people talking about commercial tunes, because to me, if you're gonna be commercial, you're gonna stand on your head and make funny noises and do idiotic things. I don't think we've ever recorded or played one tune that I didn't particularly love to play. Otherwise, I wouldn't play it."

== Personal life ==
James was married three times, first to singer Louise Tobin on May 4, 1935, with whom he had two sons, Harry Jeffrey James and Timothy Ray James. They divorced in 1943. Later that year he married actress Betty Grable. They had two daughters, Victoria Elizabeth and Jessica, before divorcing in 1965. In December 1967, James wed Las Vegas showgirl Joan Boyd. The couple had a son, Michael, before divorcing in 1970.

James owned several Thoroughbred racehorses that won races such as the California Breeders' Champion Stakes (1951) and the San Vicente Stakes (1954). He was also a founding investor in the Atlantic City Race Course. His knowledge of horse racing was demonstrated during a 1958 appearance on The Lucy–Desi Comedy Hour entitled "Lucy Wins A Racehorse".

== Death ==
James was a heavy smoker, drinker, and gambler. In 1983, he was diagnosed with lymphatic cancer, but he continued to work. He played his last professional job, with the Harry James Orchestra, on June 26, 1983, in Los Angeles, dying just nine days later in Las Vegas, Nevada, on July 5, 1983, at age 67. Frank Sinatra gave the eulogy at his funeral, held in Las Vegas.

== Filmography ==
- Hollywood Hotel (1937) (as himself, in Benny Goodman's band)
- Syncopation (1942) (as himself)
- Springtime in the Rockies (1942) (as himself)
- Private Buckaroo (1942) (as himself)
- Swing Fever (1943) (as himself)
- Best Foot Forward (1943) (as himself)
- Bathing Beauty (1944) (as himself)
- Two Girls and a Sailor (1944) (as himself)
- Do You Love Me (1946)
- If I'm Lucky (1946)
- Carnegie Hall (1947) (as himself)
- On Our Merry Way (1948) (as himself)
- I'll Get By (1950) (as himself)
- The Benny Goodman Story (1956) (as himself)
- The Opposite Sex (1956) (as himself)
- Outlaw Queen (1957)
- Riot in Rhythm (1957) (short subject; as himself)
- The Big Beat (1958)
- The Ladies Man (1961) (as himself)
- The Sting II (1983)

== Discography ==
The discography of Harry James includes 30 studio albums, 47 EPs, three soundtrack/stage and screen albums, and numerous live albums and compilation albums, along with contributions as sideman and appearances with other musicians. James released over 200 singles during his career, with nine songs reaching number one, 32 in the top ten, and 70 in the top 100 on the U.S. pop charts, as well as seven charting on the U.S. R&B chart. (Note: At the time of James's charts, Billboard magazine referred to the R&B chart as "The Harlem Hit Parade.")

=== Selected singles ===
- "Ain't She Sweet"
- "All or Nothing at All" (1939)
- "Back Beat Boogie" (1939) (Columbia 35456)
- "Blues in the Night" (1941) (Columbia 36500)
- "Boo-Woo" (1939) (Brunswick 8318/B24060, Columbia 35958/C44-1)
- "Cheek to Cheek"
- "Ciribiribin" (1939) – another million selling disc
- "Cry Me a River"
- "Don'cha Go 'Way Mad" (with the Skylarks)
- "Flight of the Bumblebee"
- "Hernando's Hideaway" (1955)
- "Honeysuckle Rose"
- "I Cried for You" (1942)
- "I Don't Want to Walk Without You" (1942)
- "I Had the Craziest Dream" – a million selling gold disc.
- "I'll Be Around"
- "I'll Get By (As Long as I Have You)" (1940)
- "I Need You Now"
- "It All Depends on You"
- "It's Been a Long, Long Time" (1945)
- "I've Heard That Song Before" (1942) – another million selling record.
- "Life Goes to a Party"
- "Manhattan"
- "The Mole"
- "My Buddy" (1939)
- "Oh My Pa-Pa (O Mein Papa)"
- "The Nearness of You"
- "One O'Clock Jump" (1938) – James' first million seller
- "Sing, Sing, Sing" (1937)
- "Sleepy Lagoon" (1942)
- "Somebody Loves Me"
- "That Old Feeling"
- "Too Marvelous for Words" (1943)
- "Truly" (with Gilda Maiken and The Skylarks)
- "Trumpet Blues and Cantabile"
- "(Up a) Lazy River"
- "Velvet Moon"
- "When Your Lover Has Gone" (1944)
- "Where or When"
- "Woo-Woo" (1939) (Brunswick 8318/B24061, Columbia 35958/C44-2)
- "You Made Me Love You" (1941) – a million selling gold disc.
- "You've Changed" (1941)

=== Selected albums ===
- Boogie Woogie (Columbia C44, 1941, compilation)
- Young Man with a Horn (Columbia CL 6106, 1950)
- Jazz Session (Columbia CL 669, 1955)
- Wild About Harry! (Capitol T/ST 874, 1957)
- The New James (Capitol T/ST 1037, 1958)
- Harry's Choice! (Capitol T/ST 1093, 1958)
- Trumpet Rhapsody And Other Great Instrumentals (Harmony HL 7162, 1959)
- Harry James and His New Swingin' Band (MGM E/SE 3778, 1959)
- Harry James...Today! (MGM E/SE 3848, 1960)
- The Spectacular Sound of Harry James (MGM E/SE 3897, 1961)
- Harry James Plays Neal Hefti (MGM E/SE 3972, 1961)
- Requests On-The-Road (MGM E/SE 4003, 1962)
- The King James Version (Sheffield Lab LAB-3, 1976)
- Comin' From A Good Place (Sheffield Lab LAB-6, 1977)
- Still Harry After All These Years (Sheffield Lab LAB-11, 1979)
- Snooty Fruity (Columbia CK 45447, 1990)
- Record Session '39–'42 (Hep CD1068 [Scotland], 1999)
- Feet Draggin' Blues '44–'47 (Hep CD62 [England], 1999)

== Awards ==
=== Grammy Hall of Fame ===
As of 2016, two recordings of Harry James had been inducted into the Grammy Hall of Fame, a special Grammy award established in 1973 to honor recordings that are at least 25 years old, and that have "qualitative or historical significance."

Harry James Grammy Hall of Fame Awards
Year recorded	Title	Genre	Label	Year inducted
1942	Trumpet Blues and Cantabile	Jazz (Album)	Columbia	1999
1941	You Made Me Love You (I Didn't Want to Do It)	Pop (Single)	Columbia	2010

=== Readers' polls ===
Metronome magazine conducted annual readers' polls ranking the top jazz musician on each instrument. The winners were invited to join an ensemble known as the Metronome All-Stars that was assembled for studio recordings. The studio sessions were held in the years 1939–42, 1946–53, and 1956, and typically resulted in two tracks which allowed each participant a one chorus solo. Harry James was chosen to play trumpet with the Metronome All-Stars in 1939, 1940 and 1941.

A similar annual readers' poll conducted by Downbeat magazine selected James as the best trumpet instrumentalist for the years 1937, 1938 and 1939, and as favorite soloist for 1942.

=== Honors and inductions ===
For his contribution to the motion picture industry James was awarded a star on the Hollywood Walk of Fame at 6683 Hollywood Boulevard on February 8, 1960.

He was inducted into the Big Band and Jazz Hall of Fame in 1983.

== Writings ==
- Harry James Studies & Improvisations for Trumpet, Harry James, ed. Elmer F. Gottschalk, New York: Robbins Music, 1939
- Harry James Trumpet Method, Harry James, Everette James, ed. Jay Arnold, New York: Robbins Music, 1941

== See also ==
- Al Lerner (composer)
- Dick Haymes
- Jack Gardner
