= Paul Weston =

American pianist, arranger, composer, and conductor (1912–1996)

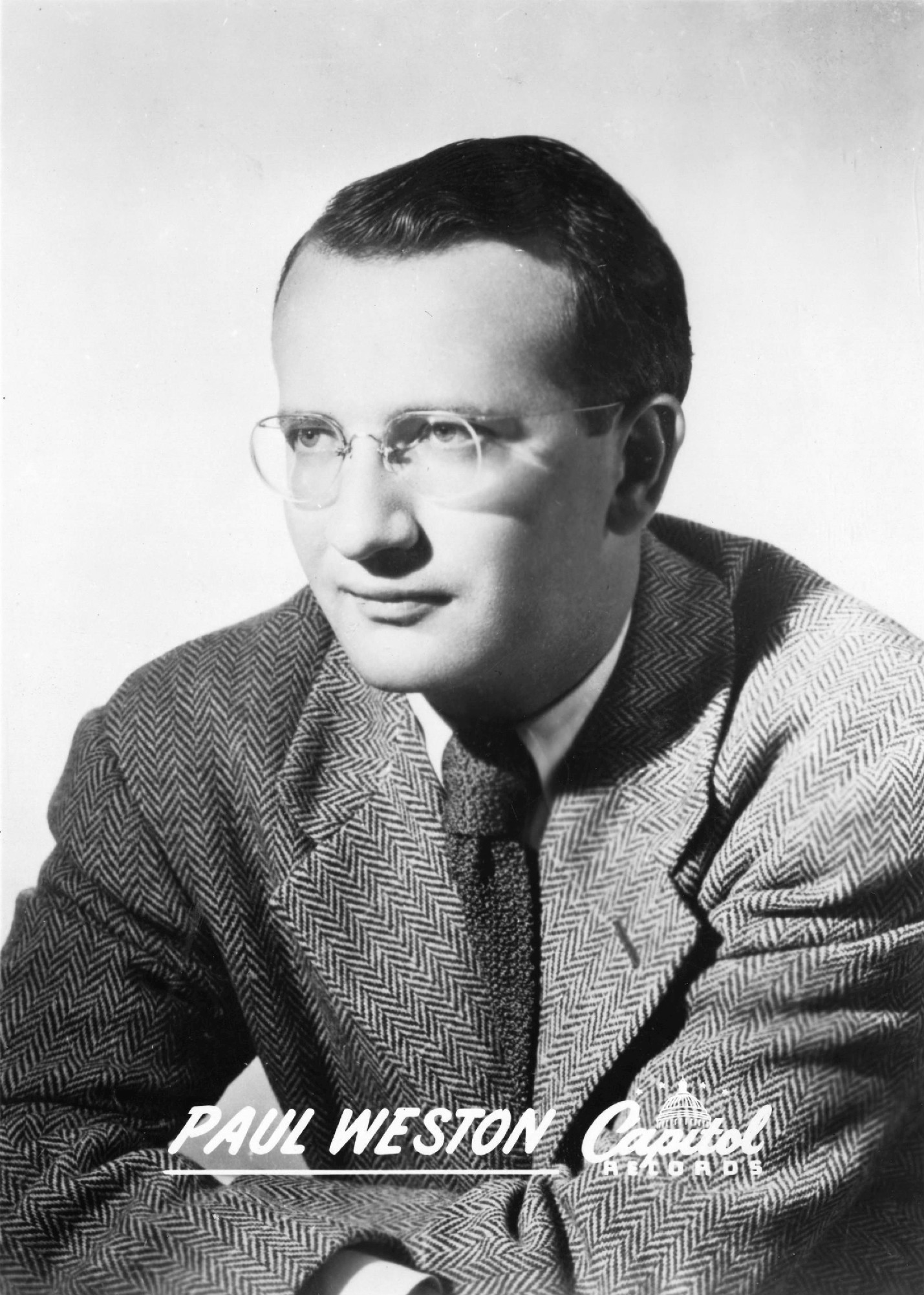
- Paul Weston at Capitol Records, 1940s

Background information
- Born: Paul Wetstein; March 12, 1912; Springfield, Massachusetts, U.S.
- Died: September 20, 1996 (aged 84) Santa Monica, California
- Genres: Jazz; easy listening; pop
- Occupations: Musician; composer; conductor; arranger; record label owner
- Instrument: Piano
- Years active: 1933–1970s
- Labels: Capitol; Columbia; Corinthian

Paul Weston (né Wetstein; March 12, 1912 – September 20, 1996) was an American pianist, arranger, composer, and conductor who worked in music and television from the 1930s to the 1970s, pioneering mood music and becoming known as "the Father of Mood Music". His compositions include popular music songs such as "I Should Care", "Day by Day", and "Shrimp Boats". He also wrote classical pieces, including "Crescent City Suite" and religious music, authoring several hymns and masses.

Born in Springfield, Massachusetts, Weston had a keen interest in music from an early age and learned to play the piano. He was educated at Springfield High School, then attended Dartmouth College and Columbia University.

At Dartmouth, Weston formed his own band and toured with the college band. He joined Columbia's dance band, The Blue Lions, but was temporarily unable to perform following a rail accident, and did some arrangements while he recovered. He sold his first arrangements to Joe Haymes in 1934. When Haymes requested more material, Weston's music was heard by Rudy Vallée, who offered him work on his radio show. Weston met Tommy Dorsey through Haymes and in 1936 became a member of Dorsey's orchestra. He persuaded Dorsey to hire The Pied Pipers after hearing them in 1938, and the group toured with the bandleader.

After leaving Dorsey in 1940, Weston worked with Dinah Shore and moved to Hollywood when he was offered film work. In California he met Johnny Mercer, who invited him to write for his new label, Capitol Records. Weston became music director there, where he worked with singer Jo Stafford and developed the mood music genre. Stafford moved with him to Columbia Records in 1950, and they were married in 1952.

Weston worked extensively in television from the 1950s to the 1970s. He helped start the Grammy Awards, which were first presented in 1959. He was honored with a Grammy Trustees Award in 1971 and spent three years as music director of Disney on Parade.

Weston and Stafford developed a comedy routine where they assumed the guise of a bad lounge act named Jonathan and Darlene Edwards. Their first album was released in 1957. In 1960, their album Jonathan and Darlene Edwards in Paris won the Grammy Award for Best Comedy Album. Weston's work in music is honored with a star on the Hollywood Walk of Fame.

== Early years and work ==
Weston was born Paul Wetstein in Springfield, Massachusetts, to Paul Wetstein, a teacher, and Anna "Annie" Grady. The family moved to Pittsfield when Weston was two, and he spent his formative years in the town. His parents were both interested in music, and when Paul Sr taught at a private girls' school, he was allowed to bring the school's gramophone home over the Christmas holidays. Weston remembered hearing "Whispering Hope" on it as a child.

At age eight, he started piano lessons. He was an economics major at Dartmouth College in New Hampshire, where he graduated cum laude and Phi Beta Kappa in 1933. During his college days, Weston had his own band called "the Green Serenaders"; this allowed him to pay his own college tuition. Weston also learned how to play the clarinet so he could travel with the college band. He went to graduate school at Columbia University and was active in the Blue Lions, Columbia's dance band. In January 1934, Weston was seriously injured in a train accident. While trying to catch a train, Weston grabbed a door handle as the train sped off. He was able to hold on to the handle and was dragged two and one half miles before losing his grip. Unable to be active in a band, he started doing music arranging as a way to keep some involvement with music while convalescing. When he returned to New York in the fall of 1934, he made his first sale of his work to Joe Haymes. Haymes liked Weston's work enough to ask him to do more arrangements for his band. His medley of Anything Goes songs was heard by Rudy Vallée, who contacted him and offered Weston a job as an arranger for his Fleischmann's Hour on radio. Weston was also doing arranging for Phil Harris.

He met Tommy Dorsey through his work with Joe Haymes. Following the Dorsey Brothers split in 1935, Tommy had yet to form an orchestra; he used the Joe Haymes Orchestra for his first engagement as a solo conductor. Weston joined Dorsey as chief arranger in 1936, holding the position until 1940. He became Dinah Shore's arranger/conductor and worked freelance for the Bob Crosby Orchestra. Weston also worked with Fibber McGee and Molly and Paul Whiteman. When Bob Crosby's band was hired for his brother Bing's film, Holiday Inn, this took him to Hollywood and into film work. He changed his name from Wetstein to Weston after his arrival in California. Weston was asked to do more work for Bing Crosby and Bob Hope, and also for Betty Hutton. Subsequent films as musical director include Belle of the Yukon (1944) and Road To Utopia (1945).

== Capitol and Columbia ==
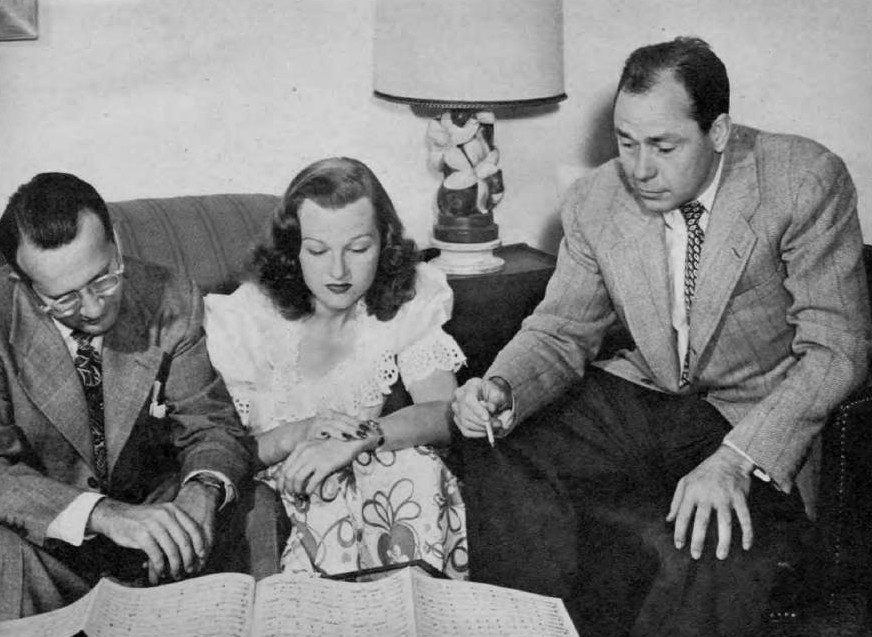
Paul Weston, Jo Stafford and Johnny Mercer going over new music arrangements for Jo Stafford. Mercer was the owner and founder of Capitol Records, Weston was employed there as both an artist and head of recording. Jo Stafford was an artist under contract to the company.

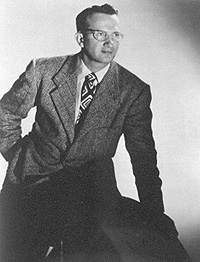
Paul Weston in 1949.

Weston met Johnny Mercer while working for Paramount in 1942; Mercer, who was preparing to start Capitol Records, wanted Weston to write for his new company. Paul wrote, arranged and directed Mercer's "Strip Polka"—the first arrangement written for the new label on April 6, 1942. On August first of that year, the 1942–44 musicians' strike began. No union musicians could record for any record company, but were able to play for live engagements and radio shows; the issue which prompted the strike was regarding record companies paying royalties to musicians. Many record companies had "stockpiled" recordings of their stars prior to the strike, planning to release them over a period of time. While the older, more established record labels were able to do this, the newly formed Capitol had no opportunity to do likewise. The strike brought the new company to a standstill until Johnny Mercer began his radio show, Johnny Mercer's Music Shop, in June 1943. The radio show was meant to be a venue for Capitol's talent during the Musicians' Strike. Mercer and Capitol recording artist Jo Stafford hosted the program, with Weston and his orchestra providing the music for it. Stafford and Weston had first met in 1938, when he was working as an arranger for Tommy Dorsey; Weston was responsible for getting Stafford's group, the Pied Pipers, an audition with Dorsey for his radio show. The recording ban was lifted for Capitol in October 1943 after an agreement was reached between the Musicians' Union and the record company; Weston was then able to return to the recording studio. In 1944, he became the company's music director. When appointed, Weston was the youngest musical director for any major record company.

Besides his work at Capitol, Weston did conducting for many radio shows during this time. He worked with Duffy's Tavern, the radio shows of Joan Davis, and Your Hit Parade. Jo Stafford, who became a regular host of the Chesterfield Supper Club in 1945, returned to California permanently in November 1946. Stafford later hosted the show from Hollywood, with Weston and his orchestra. It was around this time that Weston had a new idea for recorded music that would be similar to the soundtrack of a movie. It could be an enhancement to living but subtle enough not to stifle conversation. His album Music For Dreaming was the beginning of the "Mood Music" genre. (Note: Author Roland Gelatt says Weston's first mood music album was Music for Romancing in 1949.) In 1950, he left Capitol for a similar position at Columbia Records; Jo Stafford also signed with Columbia at the same time. He remained active in radio, with his own The Paul Weston Show, and also in acting roles on Dear John with Irene Rich, Valiant Lady, and Cavalcade of America.

In mid-1949, Capitol Records issued a promotional ten-inch vinylite record for disk jockeys only, entitled What Is This Thing Called Bop?. Containing orchestration from Weston's orchestra, the disc is a lecture narrated by Tom Reddy, tracing the history of jazz from the era of Lead Belly through various other jazz genres, such as swing, before arriving at bebop, accompanied throughout by musical examples. It was shipped to every major DJ in the United States, and was used by Dick Duncan of Clarksburg, West Virginia's WBLK station as "a primer of the progressive for his listeners." Around the same time, the musically schooled Jo Stafford developed a mathematical formula for her single "Jolly Jo (M + H + R x 3ee-oo / 4/4 aa3 x 32 = Bop)", in which she solos a bebop vocal with backing from Weston's instrumental group and vocal assistance from Dave Lambert.

Paul Weston and Jo Stafford were married on February 26, 1952; the couple had two children, Tim (born 1952), and Amy (born 1956). Both returned to Capitol in 1961, leaving the company for Dot Records in late 1965.

== Jonathan and Darlene Edwards ==
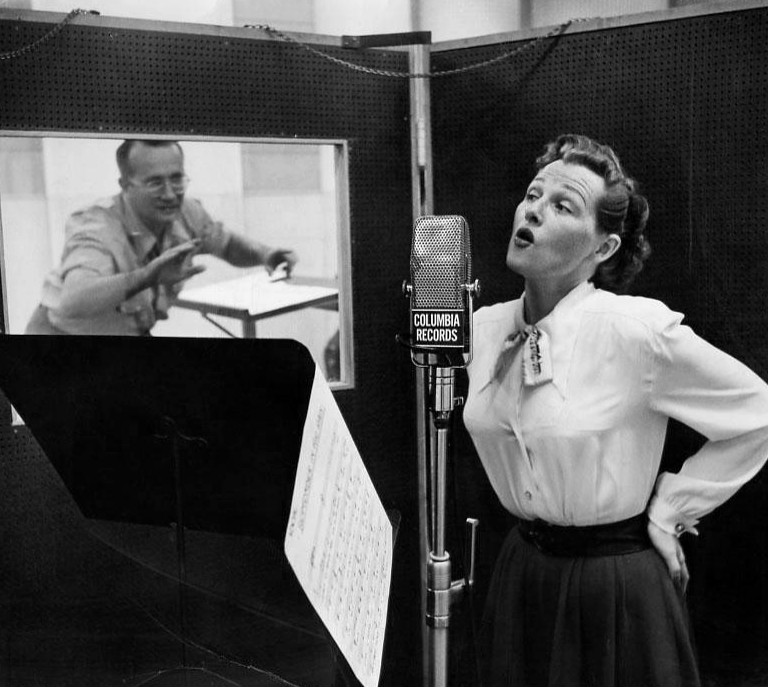
Weston and Stafford in the recording studio in 1952.

In 1957 Weston was named musical director for NBC-TV, a position he held for five years, a founding member and the first president of the National Academy of Recording Arts and Sciences, and half of a recording duo that the whole country was talking about. Paul and Jo did a skit at their parties where he would play the role of a simply horrible lounge pianist and she would vocalize in off-key melodies to the tunes he tried to play.

He went public with his portion of the act at a Columbia Records convention, where it was an instant hit; the couple agreed to do some recordings, calling themselves Jonathan and Darlene Edwards. George Avakian, a Columbia Records executive, chose the name of Jonathan Edwards for Weston's act in honor of the Calvinist preacher of the same name. Weston was concerned he might not be able to fill an album with the performances of Jonathan Edwards, so he asked Stafford to help. She became Darlene Edwards, the off-key singer. It was not immediately known to the public who had really made the records; there was much speculation as to what two famous people might be behind the music, before a 1957 Time article revealed their true identities.

In 1958, the fictional couple appeared on Jack Benny's Shower of Stars, and, in 1960, on The Garry Moore Show. The couple won a Grammy Award for Best Comedy Album of 1960 for their work as the imaginary pair. While Weston was the conductor for The Danny Kaye Show, his perpetual houseguest, Jonathan Edwards, made an appearance on the program without his singing wife, Darlene. The vocal for I Love a Piano was provided by Kaye as the pair started the television show on March 25, 1964.

They continued to release Jonathan and Darlene albums for several years, and, in 1979, released a cover of the Bee Gees' "Stayin' Alive", backed with "I Am Woman". As Jonathan and Darlene Edwards, the couple released a "sing along" album which Mitch Miller believed put an end to his television show and sing-along records. Their last release, Darlene Remembers Duke, Jonathan Plays Fats, was issued in 1982.

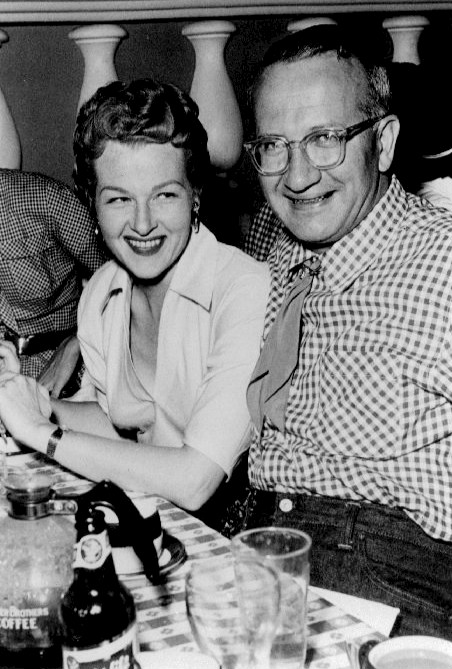
Stafford and Weston dining in 1954

== Grammys ==
The original idea of honoring those in the recording industry came from the Hollywood Chamber of Commerce in 1957. Their plan was to propose bronze sidewalk markers to be placed on Hollywood Boulevard (the beginning of the current Hollywood Walk of Fame). The Chamber approached local top recording company executives with the idea, asking for help with a list of those who deserved the honor. Weston was one of the men named to this committee by the Chamber. The committee executives decided all those who had sold a million records or a quarter million record albums during their careers would be candidates for the bronze star markers. As they continued their research, the men on the committee realized that many very important people in the recording industry would not qualify for this type of recognition. This realization prompted the founding of the National Academy of Recording Arts and Sciences, whose purpose was to create an award for recording artists. It became known as the Grammy, and the first awards were given in 1959. Paul Weston's dedication to music and recording was recognized with a Trustees' Award Grammy in 1971.

== Television and composing ==
Weston had a long career as a musical director for television, including The Danny Kaye Show, The Jonathan Winters Show, The Jim Nabors Show and for The Bob Newhart Show, a 1961 variety show. He was also the conductor and arranger for his wife's CBS television show from 1954 to 1955, The Jo Stafford Show. Although he did not provide the names of the programs, Weston once said conductors on live television shows, "should also receive a stuntman's check!" In 1959, Weston worked with Art Carney and Bil Baird's marionettes for an ABC television children's special, Art Carney Meets Peter and the Wolf, and was nominated for his musical contributions to the show.

Weston arranged Ella Fitzgerald's album Ella Fitzgerald Sings the Irving Berlin Song Book (1957), devoted to the music of Irving Berlin. Among songs he composed are "I Should Care" and "Day by Day", both of which were collaborations with Sammy Cahn and Axel Stordahl and were big hits for Frank Sinatra. He co-wrote "Shrimp Boats", published in 1951, which was popularized by Jo Stafford.

One of Weston's songs made the tiny town of Hana on the island of Maui a household word. While on a visit to the area, Weston needed to shop for gifts for his two children. He found himself at the Hasegawa General Store, about which he wrote "The Hasegawa General Store", based on his experiences there, which was recorded by Arthur Godfrey, Jim Nabors, and others.

Weston also wrote classical and religious music: one of his two symphonic suites, Crescent City Suite, has enjoyed many performances, in the "Crescent City", New Orleans, and elsewhere. It was composed in 1956 and performed in New Orleans at the Municipal Auditorium in 1957 with Weston conducting. There was enough interest in the composition for a version for school bands to be made available in 1959; a symphonic version was also issued. He was the author of many hymns and two Masses which were published by the Gregorian Institute of America. He founded Corinthian Records in the late 1970s, a company which started as a religious music label, but which later became the distributor for the couple's secular albums. His intention was to get the masters of both his and Stafford's recordings for later reproduction on compact disk. He spent three years as the musical director of Disney on Parade.

== Retirement and death ==
The couple retired from performing in the 1970s. Active for many years in charities helping the developmentally disabled, the Westons gave more of their time to these groups after their retirement. The AbilityFirst work center in Woodland Hills, California is named in Paul Weston's memory. Weston died on September 20, 1996, in Santa Monica, California, aged 84. He is buried in Holy Cross Cemetery, Culver City. In 2006, his widow, Jo Stafford donated her husband's library and her own to the University of Arizona. She died in 2008, aged 90.
