= 1960 in jazz =

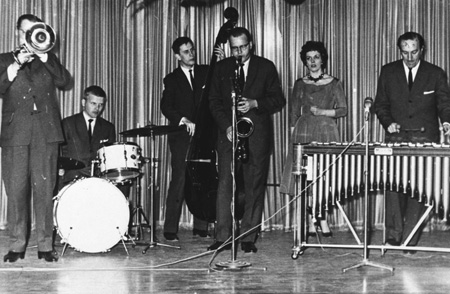
- Erik Lindström group
- Decade: 1960s in jazz
- Music: 1960 in music
- Standards: List of post-1950 jazz standards
- See also: 1959 in jazz – 1961 in jazz

This is a timeline documenting events of Jazz in the year 1960.

== Events ==
=== October ===
- 16 – The Cannonball Adderley Quintet records At the Lighthouse at the Lighthouse Café in Hermosa Beach, California.

=== June ===
- 30 – The 7th Newport Jazz Festival started in Newport, Rhode Island (June 30 – July 4).

== Album releases ==
- Art Blakey
  - The Big Beat
  - A Night in Tunisia
- Tina Brooks: True Blue
- Betty Carter: The Modern Sound
- June Christy
  - The Cool School
  - Off-Beat
- Ornette Coleman: Change of the Century
- John Coltrane: Giant Steps
- Eric Dolphy: Outward Bound
- Gil Evans: Out of the Cool
- Jimmy Giuffre: Piece for Clarinet and String Orchestra/Mobiles
- Joe Harriott: Southern Horizons
- the Jazztet
  - Big City Sounds
  - Meet the Jazztet
- Sam Jones: The Soul Society
- Duke Jordan: Flight to Jordan
- Stan Kenton: Road Show
- Herbie Mann: Flute, Brass, Vibes and Percussion
- Charles Mingus: Charles Mingus Presents Charles Mingus
- Hank Mobley: Soul Station
- Modern Jazz Quartet
  - Pyramid
  - European Concert
- Wes Montgomery
  - The Incredible Jazz Guitar
  - Movin' Along
- Oliver Nelson: Taking Care of Business
- David Newman & James Clay: The Sound of the Wide Open Spaces!!!!
- Art Pepper: Gettin' Together
- Max Roach: We Insist!
- Charlie Rouse: Takin' Care of Business
- George Russell
  - George Russell Sextet at the Five Spot
  - Jazz in the Space Age
  - Stratusphunk
- Gunther Schuller [John Lewis]: Jazz Abstractions
- Horace Silver: Horace-Scope
- Jimmy Smith: Back at the Chicken Shack
- Cecil Taylor: The World of Cecil Taylor
- Clark Terry: Color Changes
- Mel Tormé: Mel Tormé Swings Shubert Alley
- Lennie Tristano: The New Tristano
- Fats Waller: Handful of Keys (released posthumously)
- Randy Weston: Uhuru Afrika
- Phil Woods: Rights of Swing
- John Wright: South Side Soul

== Deaths ==
April

- 11 – Zilas Görling, Swedish saxophonist (born 1911).
- 13 – Beverly Kenney, American singer (born 1932).

June

- 12 – Isidore Barbarin, American cornet and alto horn player (born 1871).

July

- 3 – Lee Collins, American trumpeter (born 1901).
- 5 – Bill Johnson, American saxophonist, clarinetist, and arranger (born 1912).
- 30 – Arv Garrison, American guitarist (born 1922).

August

- Jimmy Bertrand, American drummer (born 1900).

September

- 8 – Oscar Pettiford, American upright bassist, cellist, and composer (born 1922).
- 24 – Mátyás Seiber, Hungarian-born composer (born 1905).

October

- 10 – June Cole, American bassist, tubist, and singer (born 1903).

November

- 24 – Edgar Meyer, American bassist, multi-instrumentalist, and composer.

Unknown date

- Lawrence Duhé, clarinetist, and bandleader (born 1887).

== Births ==
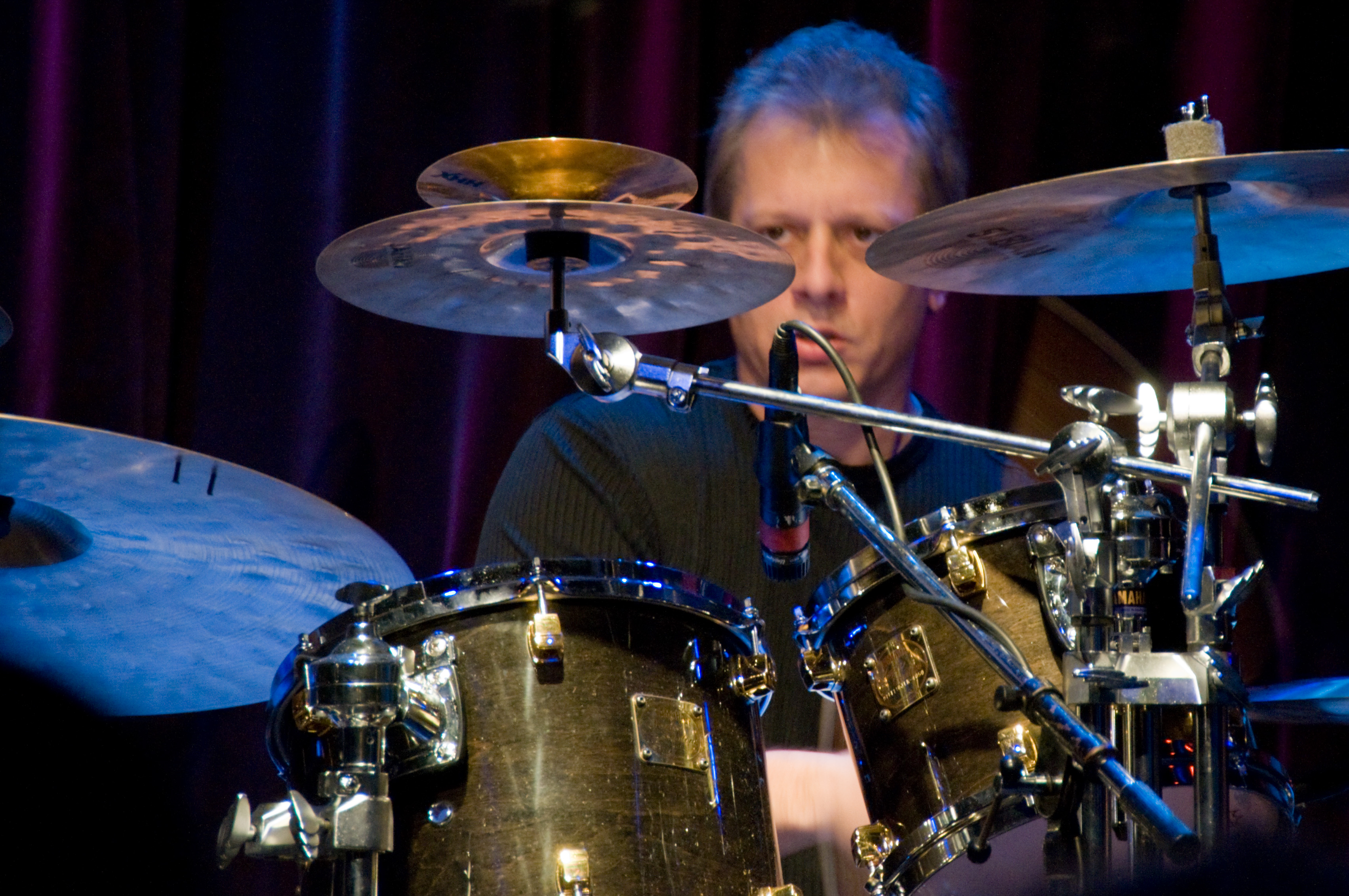
Dave Weckl in 2007.

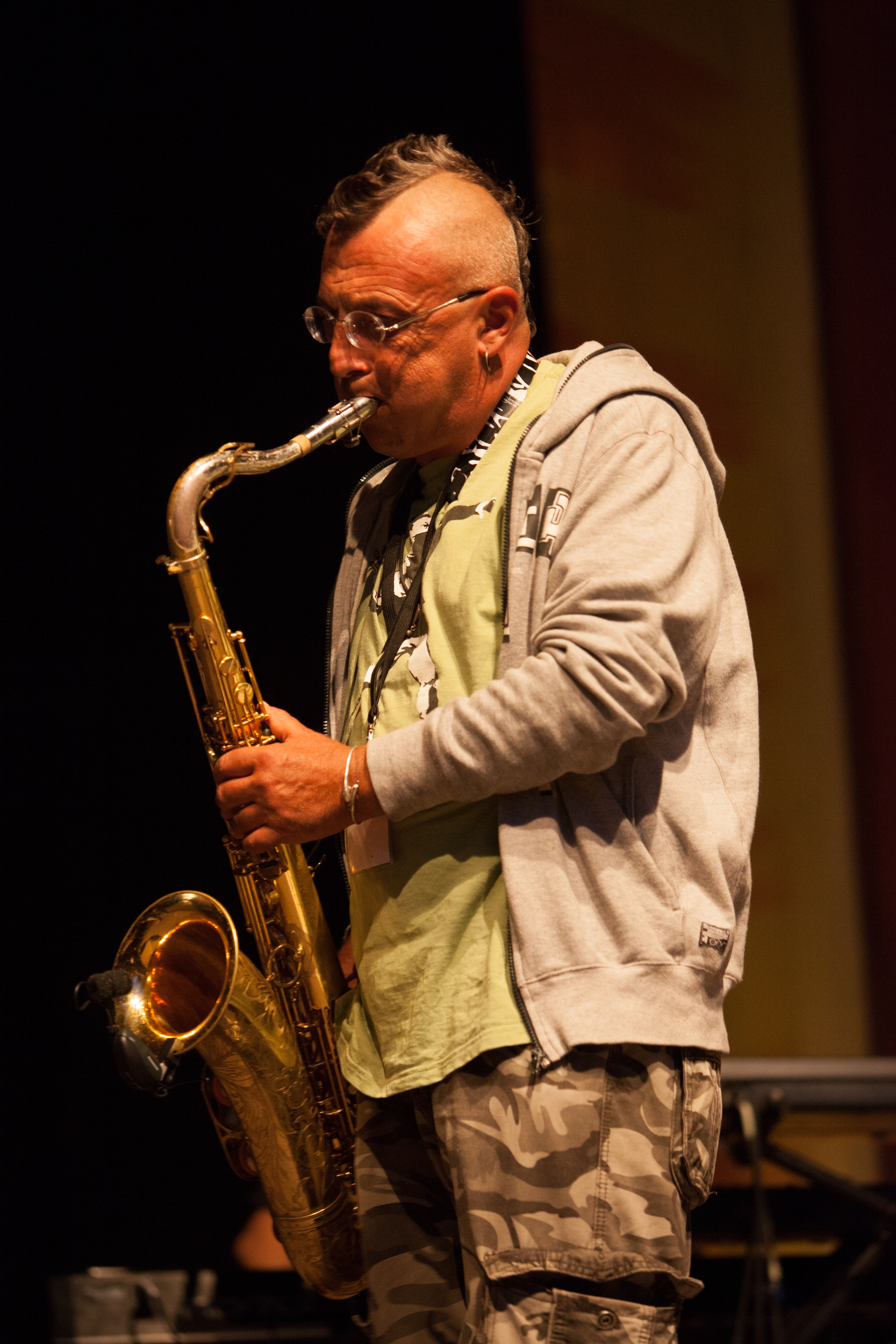
Daniele Sepe in 2013.

January

- 1 – Liu Yuan, Chinese saxophonist.
- 3 – Marla Glen, American singer.
- 8
  - Dave Weckl, American drummer.
  - Lee Tomboulian, American pianist.
- 16
  - Richard Elliot, Scottish-American saxophonist.
  - Wilhelm Schröter, Brazilian composer and pianist.
- 20 – Jeff "Tain" Watts, American drummer.
- 26 – María Rivas, Venezuelan singer.
- 29 – David Piltch, Canadian bassist and session musician.

February

- 3 – Craig Bailey, American saxophonist, flautist, and clarinetist.
- 11 – Russ Freeman, American guitarist.
- 29 – Khaled, Algerian singer, multti-instrumentalist, and songwriter.

March

- 2 – Lennart Ginman, Danish bassist, composer, and music producer.
- 19 – Eliane Elias, Brazilian pianist and vocalist.
- 21 – Dominic Miller, Argentinian guitarist and composer, Sting.
- 25 – Chad Wackerman, American drummer.
- 26 – Nelson Rangell, American saxophonist and composer.
- 27 – Victor Bailey, American bassist.
- 29 – Chano Domínguez, Spanish pianist.

April

- 1 – Banjo Mosele, Botswanan guitarist, singer and composer.
- 3 – Erik Truffaz, French trumpeter.
- 6 – John Pizzarelli, American guitarist, vocalist, and songwriter.
- 17 – Daniele Sepe, Italian saxophonist and flautist.
- 20 – John Altenburgh, American pianist, composer and arranger.
- 24 – Friðrik Karlsson, Icelandic guitarist and songwriter.
- 25 – Mário Laginha, Portuguese piano player and composer.
- 28 – Rolf Graf, Norwegian bassist (died 2013).
- 30
  - Paul Taylor, American saxophonist.
  - Rodney Kendrick, American pianist, bandleader, composer, and producer.

May

- 3 – Alan Thomson, Scottish bassist and vocalist.
- 12 – Lena Willemark, Swedish singer.
- 14 – Alec Dankworth, English bassist and composer.
- 20 – Tore Brunborg, Norwegian saxophonist.
- 24 – Ken Schaphorst, American composer, performer and educator.
- 25 – Wallace Roney, American trumpeter.

June

- 4 – Fred Thelonious Baker, English guitarist and bass guitarist.
- 8
  - Povl Erik Carstensen, Danish comedian, actor, and upright bassist.
  - Terje Gewelt, Norwegian upright bassist.
- 14 – Gary Husband, English drummer, pianist, and bandleader.
- 19 – Carmen Bradford, American singer, Count Basie Orchestra.
- 20 – Jeremy Monteiro, Singaporean pianist, singer, and composer.
- 22 – Arturo O'Farrill, Mexican pianist and composer.
- 23 – Donald Harrison, American saxophonist.
- 26 – Zachary Breaux, American guitarist (died 1997).

July

- 8 – Valarie Pettiford, American actress, dancer, and jazz singer.
- 14 – Angélique Kidjo, Beninese singer-songwriter and activist.
- 15 – Stig Hvalryg, Norwegian upright bassist.
- 20 – Ole Jacob Hystad, Norwegian tenor saxophonist and clarinetist.
- 27 – Jean Toussaint, American tenor and soprano saxophonist.

August

- 3 – Greg Osby, American saxophonist.
- 12 – Andy Quin, British composer and pianist.
- 14 – Lloyd Swanton, Australian upright bassist, bass guitarist, and composer.
- 17 – Maria Pia De Vito, Italian singer, composer and arranger.
- 21
  - Peter Apfelbaum, American pianist, tenor saxophonist, drummer and composer.
  - Tom Kennedy, American bassist.
- 26
  - Branford Marsalis, American saxophonist, composer, and bandleader.
  - Jim Beard, American keyboardist.
- 27 – Eldad Tarmu, American vibraphonist and composer.

September

- 4 – Lonnie Plaxico, African-American upright bassist.
- 8 – Steve Waterman, British trumpeter, composer, and educator.
- 16 – Graham Haynes, American cornetist, trumpeter and composer.
- 18 – Nils Petter Molvær, Norwegian trumpeter, composer, and producer, Masqualero.
- 21 – Mats Rondin, Swedish cellist and conductor (died 2014).

October

- 2 – Django Bates, British composer, pianist, multi-instrumentalist and band leader.
- 9 – Kenny Garrett, American saxophonist and flautist.
- 10 – John Beasley, American pianist.
- 13 – Orphy Robinson, British vibraphonist and multi-instrumentalist.
- 15 – Henrik Bolberg Pedersen, Danish trumpeter and flugelhorn player
- 16 – Leila Pinheiro, singer and pianist.
- 25 – Michel Massot, Belgian tubist and trombonist.
- 29 – Jens Winther, Danish trumpeter, composer, and bandleader (died 2011).

November

- 4 – Adrián Iaies, Argentine pianist and composer.
- 5 – Daryl Hayott, American drummer, bassist, percussionist, keyboardist, and trumpeter.
- 15 – Sergio Cammariere, Italian singer-songwriter.
- 23 – Jean-Paul Bourelly, American guitarist.
- 27 – Maria Schneider, American arranger, composer, and big-band leader.

December

- 1 – Chris Standring, British guitarist.
- 5 – Brian Bromberg, American bassist and producer.
- 7 – Matthew Shipp, American pianist, composer, and bandleader.
- 12 – Sebi Tramontana, Italian trombonist.
- 16 – Mike Fahn, American trombonist.
- 19 – Laurent de Wilde, French pianist, composer, and writer.
- 28 – Ted Nash, American saxophonist and composer.

Unknown date

- Lekan Babalola, Nigerian singer and percussionist.
- Mark Ledford, American trumpet player, vocalist and guitarist (died 2004).
- Muriel Anderson, American composer, guitarist, and harp-guitarist.
- Paul Taylor (saxophonist), American saxophonist.
- Pharez Whitted, American trumpeter.
- Tino di Geraldo, French-Spanish percussionist, tabla player, drummer, and producer.
- Umberto Petrin, Italian pianist, composer, and poet.

== See also ==
- 1960s in jazz
- List of years in jazz
- 1960 in music
