= June Christy Recalls Those Kenton Days =

Studio album by June Christy
- Released: 1959
- Recorded: January 15, 21, February 5, 1959
- Studio: Capitol (Hollywood)
- Genre: Vocal jazz
- Label: Capitol
- Producer: Bill Miller

June Christy chronology
The Song Is June! (1958)	June Christy Recalls Those Kenton Days (1959)	Ballads for Night People (1959)

June Christy Recalls Those Kenton Days is a 1959 album by June Christy.

== Music and recording ==
The album was recorded at the Capitol Studios in Hollywood, on January 15, 21, and February 5, 1959. The material is tunes Christy sang when she was with the Stan Kenton Orchestra. The arrangements were by Pete Rugolo, who also conducted the band, which contained many from Kenton's ensembles.

The original LP contained five songs per side. The liner notes present June Christy's reaction to the project, quoting her as saying, "This has been absorbing as well as sentimental for all concerned. The originals were, and still are, all top efforts, and it was a real challenge to try to re-do such well-established concepts. I think we succeeded in doing right by them."

== Release and reception ==
Professional ratings
Review scores
Source	Rating
AllMusic	4/5 stars

The album was released by Capitol Records. The AllMusic reviewer suggested that it would be attractive to Christy fans, but that her earlier Something Cool and The Misty Miss Christy were superior. June Christy Recalls Those Kenton Days was reissued in 2001 as a double-CD together with This Is June Christy.

== Track listing ==
1. “Just A-Sittin' and A-Rockin'” (Duke Ellington, Billy Strayhorn, Lee Gaines) - 2:53
2. “A Hundred Years from Today” (Victor Young, Joe Young, Ned Washington) - 4:13
3. “The Lonesome Road” (Nathaniel Shilkret, Gene Austin) - 3:50
4. “She's Funny That Way” (Neil Moret, Richard A. Whiting) - 3:41
5. “It's a Pity to Say Goodnight” (Billy Reid) - 1:57
6. “Willow Weep for Me” (Ann Ronell) - 3:14
7. “Easy Street” (Alan Rankin Jones) - 4:16
8. “Across the Alley from the Alamo” - (Joe Greene) - 2:15
9. “Come Rain or Come Shine” (Harold Arlen, Johnny Mercer) - 2:32
10. “How High the Moon” (Morgan Lewis, Nancy Hamilton) - 2:31

== Personnel ==
- June Christy - vocals

The LP/CD sleeve notes state the following were involved:

- Bob Cooper - tenor saxophone, arranger
- Paul Horn saxophone
- Chuck Gentry - baritone saxophone
- Bob Fitzpatrick - trombone
- Milt Bernhart - trombone
- Frank Rosolino - trombone
- Kenny Shroyer - bass trombone
- Buddy Childers - trumpet
- Ollie Mitchell - trumpet
- Don Fagerquist - trumpet
- Russ Freeman - piano
- Jim Hall - guitar
- Red Callender - bass
- Joe Mondragon - bass
- Shelly Manne - drums
- Pete Rugolo - arranger, conductor
