= The Song Is June! =

Studio album by June Christy
- Released: 1958
- Recorded: July–August 1958
- Studio: Capitol Studios, Hollywood
- Genre: Vocal jazz
- Length: 64:38
- Label: Capitol

June Christy chronology
June's Got Rhythm (1958)	The Song Is June! (1958)	June Christy Recalls Those Kenton Days (1959)

Professional ratings
Review scores
Source	Rating
The Penguin Guide to Jazz Recordings	4/4 stars

The Song Is June! is a 1958 album by June Christy recorded with Pete Rugolo's Orchestra. It was reissued in 1997 as a double CD with Off-Beat.

== Track listing ==
1. "Spring Can Really Hang You Up the Most" (Tommy Wolf, Fran Landesman) – 4:13
2. "The One I Love (Belongs to Somebody Else)" (Isham Jones, Gus Kahn) – 2:00
3. "Nobody's Heart" (Richard Rodgers, Lorenz Hart) – 4:07
4. "My Shining Hour" (Harold Arlen, Johnny Mercer) – 1:47
5. "I Remember You" (Victor Schertzinger, Johnny Mercer) – 2:55
6. "Night Time Was My Mother" (Connie Pearce, Arnold Miller) – 2:55
7. "I Wished on the Moon" (Ralph Rainger, Dorothy Parker) – 2:18
8. "The Song Is You" (Jerome Kern, Oscar Hammerstein II) – 4:20
9. "As Long as I Live" (Harold Arlen, Ted Koehler) – 2:00
10. "Saturday's Children" (André Previn, Bob Russell) – 2:56

== Personnel ==
Tracks 3, 6, and 10

- June Christy – vocals
- Bud Shank – alto saxophone
- Bob Cooper – tenor saxophone
- Marty Berman – baritone saxophone
- Vincent DeRosa – flugelhorn
- Red Mitchell bass
- Larry Bunker – vibraphone
- Tony Rizzi – guitar
- Shelly Manne – drums
- Dan Lube – violin
- Lou Raderman – violin
- David Frisina – violin
- Victor Arno – violin
- Erno Neufeld – violin
- Alfred Lustgarten – violin
- Lou Klass – violin
- Samuel Freed – violin
- Benny Gill – violin
- Virginia Majewski – viola
- Stanley Harris – viola
- Alex Neiman – viola
- Ed Lustgarten – cello
- Raphael Kramer – cello
- Kurt Reher – cello
- Kathryn Julye – harp
- Pete Rugolo – arranger, conductor

Tracks 2, 4, 7 and 9

- June Christy – vocals
- Pete Candoli – trumpet
- Buddy Childers – trumpet
- Ed Leddy – trumpet
- Al Porcino – trumpet
- Milt Bernhart – trombone
- Frank Rosolino- trombone
- Herb Harper- trombone
- George Roberts- bass trombone
- Vincent DeRosa – flugelhorn
- Jack Cave – flugelhorn
- Bud Shank – alto saxophone
- Paul Horn – alto saxophone, flute
- Bob Cooper – tenor saxophone
- Ronny Lang – tenor saxophone
- Chuck Gentry – baritone saxophone
- Russ Freeman- piano
- Howard Roberts – guitar
- Sam Rice – bass
- Red Mitchell bass
- Shelly Manne – drums
- Larry Bunker – vibraphone
- Pete Rugolo – arranger, conductor

Tracks 1, 5 and 8

- June Christy – vocals
- Vincent DeRosa – flugelhorn
- Jack Cave – flugelhorn
- Paul Horn – alto saxophone
- Bob Cooper – tenor saxophone
- Marty Berman – baritone saxophone
- Tony Rizzi -guitar
- Red Mitchell – bass
- Frank Flynn – drums
- Larry Bunker – vibraphone
- Kathryn Julye – harp
- Dan Lube – violin
- Lou Raderman – violin
- Erno Neufeld – violin
- Victor Lustgarten – violin
- Virginia Majewski – viola
- Alex Nieman – viola
- Stanley Harris – viola
- Ed Lustgarten – cello
- Ralph Kramer – cello
- Kurt Reher – cello
- Pete Rugolo – arranger, conductor
