= The Swing's to TV =

Studio album by Bud Shank and Bob Cooper
- Released: 1958
- Recorded: January 21 and February 18, 1958; Capitol Studios in Hollywood, CA
- Genre: Jazz
- Length: 37:52
- Label: World Pacific WPM-411/ST-1002
- Producer: Russ Freeman

Bob Cooper chronology
Coop! The Music of Bob Cooper (1958)	The Swing's to TV (1958)	Blowin' Country (1958)

Bud Shank chronology
Bud Shank Plays Tenor (1957)	The Swing's to TV (1958)	Blowin' Country (1958)

The Swing's to TV (subtitled Bud Shank and Bob Cooper Play Theme Songs from Television Shows) is an album by saxophonists Bud Shank and Bob Cooper released on the World Pacific label. The album features jazz interpretations of theme music from the TV shows Disneyland, The Frank Sinatra Show, The Bob Hope Show, The Rosemary Clooney Show, The Danny Thomas Show, The Dinah Shore Show, The Eddie Fisher Show, The Bob Cummings Show, The Steve Allen Show and The George Burns and Gracie Allen Show.

== Reception ==
Professional ratings
Review scores
Source	Rating
AllMusic	3.5/5 stars

The AllMusic review by Scott Yanow states: "the basic concept behind the session is the kind of populist nod one rarely associates with cool-school jazz. Thing is, The Swing's to TV is great stuff, a cerebral and atmospheric set of ballads performed with sincerity and affection -- Shank and Cooper always make for a compelling tandem, and songs like 'When You Wish Upon a Star' and 'Put Your Dreams Away' are well matched to their respective talents".

== Track listing ==
1. "When You Wish Upon a Star" (Leigh Harline, Ned Washington) - 4:21
2. "Put Your Dreams Away" (Ruth Lowe, Paul Mann, Stephen Weiss) - 3:09
3. "Thanks for the Memory" (Ralph Rainger, Leo Robin) - 4:32
4. "Tenderly" (Walter Gross, Jack Lawrence) - 2:56
5. "Danny Boy" (Traditional) - 4:39
6. "Dinah" (Harry Akst, Sam M. Lewis, Joe Young) - 3:22
7. "As Long As There's Music" (Jule Styne, Sammy Cahn) - 3:46
8. "A Romantic Guy, I" (Del Sharbutt) - 3:39
9. "Steve Allen Theme" (Steve Allen) - 4:13
10. "The Love Nest" (Louis Hirsch, Otto Harbach) - 3:15
- Recorded at Capitol Studios in Hollywood, CA on January 21, 1958 (tracks 1, 2, 4, & 5) and February 18, 1958 (tracks 3 & 6–10)

== Personnel ==
- Bud Shank - alto saxophone, flute
- Bob Cooper - tenor saxophone, oboe
- Claude Williamson - piano
- Don Prell - bass
- Chuck Flores - drums
- Jack Pepper, Eudice Shapiro, Bob Sushel - violin (tracks 1, 2, 4 & 5)
- Milt Thomas - viola (tracks 1, 2, 4 & 5)
- Ray Kramer - cello (tracks 1, 2, 4 & 5)
