= Gone for the Day =

Studio album by June Christy
- Released: 1957
- Recorded: June 18, July 2, 15, 1957
- Genre: Vocal jazz
- Label: Capitol

June Christy chronology
| Fair and Warmer! (1957) | Gone for the Day (1957) | This Is June Christy (1958) |

Professional ratings
Review scores
| Source | Rating |
|---|---|
| Allmusic | 3.5/5 stars |
| Disc | 4/5 stars |

Gone for the Day is a 1957 studio album by singer June Christy. The songs were all arranged by her longtime collaborator Pete Rugolo.

Gone for the Day was repackaged and released on August 25, 1998, as a part of a 2-albums-on-1-CD release along with Fair and Warmer!.

== Track listing ==
1. "It's So Peaceful in the Country" (Alec Wilder) – 4:19
2. "When the Sun Comes Out" (Harold Arlen, Ted Koehler) – 3:08
3. "It's a Most Unusual Day" (Jimmy McHugh, Harold Adamson) 2:21
4. "Interlude" (Pete Rugolo, Bob Russell) – 4:42
5. "Love Turns Winter to Spring" (Matt Dennis, Frank Kilduff) – 3:30
6. "When You Awake" (Harry Nemo) – 2:26
7. "Lazy Afternoon" (John LaTouche, Jerome Moross) – 3:15
8. "When the World Was Young" (Philippe-Gérard, Johnny Mercer) – 4:35
9. "Gone for the Day" (Bob Cooper, Bob Russell)
10. "Lost in a Summer Night" (Milton Raskin, André Previn)
11. "Give Me the Simple Life" (Rube Bloom, Harry Ruby)
12. "(Love's Got Me in a) Lazy Mood" (Eddie Miller, Johnny Mercer)

== Personnel ==
- June Christy – vocals
- Pete Rugolo – arranger, conductor
- Milt Bernhart – trombone (tracks 3, 5, 11, 12)
- Herbie Harper – trombone (tracks 3, 5, 11, 12)
- Tommy Pederson – trombone (tracks 3, 5, 11, 12)
- Frank Rosolino – trombone (tracks 3, 5, 11, 12)
- George Roberts – bass trombone (tracks 3, 5, 11, 12)
- John Cave – French horn (tracks 1, 4, 7, 10)
- Bud Shank – flute ( tracks 1, 2, 4, 6–10)
- Bob Cooper – oboe (tracks 2, 6, 8, 9)
- Marty Berman – bass clarinet (tracks 3, 5, 11, 12)
- Bernie Mattison – vibraharp (tracks 3, 5, 11, 12)
- Howard Roberts – guitar
- Benny Aronov – piano (tracks 2, 3, 5, 6, 8, 9, 11, 12)
- Red Callender – bass (tracks 1, 4, 7, 10)
- Red Mitchell – bass (tracks 2, 3, 5, 6, 8, 9, 11, 12)
- Irv Cottler – drums (tracks 1, 4, 7, 10)
- Alvin Stoller – drums (tracks 3, 5, 11, 12)
- Shelly Manne – drums (tracks 2, 6, 8, 9)

(Tracks 1, 4, 7, 10 add a large string section; tracks 2, 6, 8, 9 add a small string section and woodwind group.)
