= Ballads for Night People =

Studio album by June Christy
- Released: 1959
- Recorded: 1959
- Genre: Vocal jazz
- Label: Capitol
- Producer: Bill Miller

June Christy chronology
June Christy Recalls Those Kenton Days (1959)	Ballads for Night People (1959)	Road Show (1959)

Ballads for Night People is a 1959 album by jazz vocalist June Christy.

Professional ratings
Review scores
Source	Rating
AllMusic	4/5 stars

== Track listing ==
1. "Bewitched, Bothered and Bewildered" (Richard Rodgers, Lorenz Hart) – 4:56
2. "Night People" (Tommy Wolf, Fran Landesman) – 3:20
3. "Do Nothing till You Hear from Me" (Duke Ellington, Bob Russell) – 4:06
4. "I Had A Little Sorrow" (Bob Cooper, Edna St. Vincent Millay) – 3:50
5. "I'm In Love" (Norman Kaye, Richard Ferraris) – 2:45
6. "Shadow Woman" (Arthur Hamilton) – 3:13
7. "Kissing Bug" (Rex Stewart, Billy Strayhorn, Joya Sherrill) – 2:41
8. "My Ship" (Kurt Weill, Ira Gershwin) – 3:58
9. "Don't Get Around Much Anymore" (Duke Ellington, Bob Russell) – 2:58
10. "Make Love to Me" (Paul Mann, Stephan Weiss, Kim Gannon) – 3:08

== Personnel ==
- June Christy – vocals
- Bob Cooper – arranger, conductor, tenor saxophone
- Frank Rosolino – trombone
- Bud Shank – alto saxophone, flute
- Buddy Collette – clarinet
- Chuck Gentry – bass clarinet, contrabass clarinet
- Joe Castro – piano
- Red Callender – bass
- Mel Lewis – drums
- Stan Levey – drums
- Kathryn Julye – harp
- Jim Decker – French horn
- Norman Benno – English horn, bassoon

Recorded Los Angeles, 27 August and 10 September 1959.
