= Fair and Warmer! =

1957 studio album by June Christy

Studio album by June Christy
- Released: 1957
- Recorded: January 3, 15, 21, 1957
- Genre: Vocal jazz
- Label: Capitol

June Christy chronology
The Misty Miss Christy (1956)	Fair and Warmer! (1957)	Gone for the Day (1957)

Professional ratings
Review scores
Source	Rating
Allmusic	3/5 stars

Fair and Warmer! is a 1957 studio album by June Christy. The songs were arranged by Pete Rugolo, and players on the record include trumpeter Don Fagerquist, trombonist Frank Rosolino, altoist Bud Shank, and tenor saxophonist Bob Cooper (who was also Christy's husband); none of the notable musicians were credited in the album's brief liner notes. The record peaked at No. 16 on the Billboard Pop Music Charts.

Fair and Warmer! was repackaged on a 2-albums-on-1-CD release along with her record Gone for the Day.

== Track listing ==
1. "I Want to Be Happy" (Vincent Youmans, Irving Caesar) - 1:21
2. "Imagination" (Jimmy Van Heusen, Johnny Burke) - 3:14
3. "I've Never Been in Love Before" (Frank Loesser) - 1:51
4. "Irresistible You" (Don Raye, Gene De Paul) - 2:38
5. "No More" (Bob Russell, Toots Camarata) - 3:00
6. "Better Luck Next Time" (Irving Berlin) - 1:43
7. "Let There Be Love" (Lionel Rand, Ian Grant) - 1:54
8. "When Sunny Gets Blue" (Jack Segal, Marvin Fisher) - 2:56
9. "The Best Thing for You" (Berlin) - 2:14
10. "Beware My Heart" (Sam Coslow) 3:12
11. "I Know Why (And So Do You)" (Harry Warren, Mack Gordon) - 2:10
12. "It's Always You" (Van Heusen, Burke) - 2:52

== Personnel ==
- June Christy – vocals
- Pete Rugolo – arranger, conductor
- Don Fagerquist – trumpet
- Frank Rosolino – trombone
- Vincent DeRosa – French horn
- Clarence Karella – tuba
- Bud Shank – alto saxophone, flute
- Bob Cooper – tenor saxophone
- Dave Pell – baritone saxophone
- Larry Bunker – vibraphone
- Howard Roberts – guitar
- Benny Aronov – piano
- Red Mitchell – bass
- Shelly Manne – drums
