= Just A-Sittin' and A-Rockin' =

1941 song

"Just A-Sittin' and A-Rockin'" is a 1941 song written by Billy Strayhorn, Lee Gaines, and Duke Ellington.

== Notable recordings ==
- Johnny Dankworth - The Best of Johnny Dankworth (2008)
- June Christy - Recalls Those Kenton Days (1959), The Best Of The Capitol Years
- Ella Fitzgerald - Ella Fitzgerald Sings the Duke Ellington Songbook (1958)
- Stan Kenton - On AFRS: 1944-45 (2006) vocal by June Christy
- The Delta Rhythm Boys - release charted #17, "their first (and only) chart success" (December 1945)

== See also ==
- Duke Ellington
- Duke Ellington discography
