= Big Band Specials =

Studio album by June Christy
- Released: 1962
- Recorded: 1962
- Genre: Vocal jazz
- Label: Capitol
- Producer: Bill Miller

June Christy chronology
This Time of Year (1961)	Big Band Specials (1962)	Best of June Christy (1962)

Professional ratings
Review scores
Source	Rating
The Penguin Guide to Jazz Recordings	3.5/4 stars
New Record Mirror	4/5 stars

Big Band Specials is a 1962 album by June Christy, with tracks arranged by Bill Holman, Shorty Rogers and husband Bob Cooper.

== Track listing ==
1. “You Came a Long Way from St. Louis” (John Benson Brooks, Bob Russell) - 2:16
2. “Swingin’ On Nothin’” (Sy Oliver, Billy Moore) - 2:23
3. “Is You Is Or Is You Ain't My Baby” (Billy Austin, Louis Jordan) - 2:46
4. “Prelude to a Kiss” (Duke Ellington, Irving Mills, Irving Gordon) - 3:54
5. “Skyliner” (Charlie Barnet as Dale Bannett) - 3:01
6. “A Night in Tunisia” (Dizzy Gillespie, Jon Hendricks) - 2:50
7. “It Don’t Mean a Thing” (Duke Ellington, Irving Mills) - 1:43
8. “Frenesi” (Alberto Dominguez, Ray Charles, Bob Russell) - 2:20
9. “Stompin' at the Savoy” (Edgar Sampson, Chick Webb, Benny Goodman, Andy Razaf) - 2:30
10. “Goodbye” (Gordon Jenkins) - 3:04
11. “Time Was (Duerme)” (Miguel Prado, Gabriel Luna, Bob Russell) - 2:54
12. “Until (The Mole)” ( LeRoy Holmes, Harry James, Hal David) - 2:47

== Musicians ==
- June Christy - vocals
- Conte Candoli - trumpet
- Lee Katzman - trumpet
- Al Porcino - trumpet
- Ray Triscari - trumpet
- Vern Friley - trombone
- Lew McCreary - trombone
- Frank Rosolino - trombone
- John Halliburton - trombone
- Dick Nash - trombone
- Kenny Shroyer - bass trombone
- Joe Maini - also saxophone
- Bud Shank (as Bud Legge) - alto saxophone
- Charlie Kennedy - alto saxophone
- Bob Cooper - tenor saxophone
- Bill Perkins - tenor saxophone
- Jack Nimitz - baritone saxophone
- Jimmy Rowles - piano
- Joe Mondragon - bass guitar
- Mel Lewis - drums
- Bob Cooper - arranger (track 12)
- Shorty Rogers - arranger (tracks 1, 4 & 11)
- Bill Holman - arranger (all other tracks)

Tracks 3, 6, 7 Recorded Capitol Tower, Hollywood, 25 October 1962

Tracks 9, 10, 12 Recorded Capitol Tower, Hollywood, 5 November 1962

Tracks 1, 2, 4, 5, 8, 11 Recorded Capitol Tower, Hollywood, 19 November 1962
