= It's Always You =

Single by Bing Crosby
- B-side: "You Lucky People, You"; (Burke/Van Heusen)
- Released: 1941
- Recorded: 3 December 1940
- Genre: Pop
- Length: 3:14
- Label: Decca DLA2253-B
- Composer(s): Jimmy Van Heusen
- Lyricist(s): Johnny Burke

"It's Always You" is a song written by Jimmy Van Heusen (music) and Johnny Burke (lyrics) for the 1941 film Road to Zanzibar. In the film it was sung by Bing Crosby to Dorothy Lamour as they paddled a canoe up a jungle river. It was also used briefly in a comedy scene in the film as a quasi-requiem for Lamour's character, who was erroneously thought to have been killed by a leopard.

The song is notable as it was the first that Crosby recorded by the Burke and Van Heusen team. They subsequently produced many hits for Crosby over the following years including the Oscar winner "Swinging on a Star". Burke had been writing for Crosby with Jimmy Monaco and it was planned that they would write the songs for "Road to Zanzibar". However Monaco fell ill and Van Heusen replaced him. Crosby recorded the song for Decca Records for commercial release on December 3, 1940 with John Scott Trotter and his Orchestra. The success of the song was adversely affected by a strike of the broadcasting networks against ASCAP. Various recordings of the song were reissued in March 1943 when the dispute ended and the Famous Music Company, the publisher of the sheet music, launched a simultaneous drive.

The song was also recorded by Frank Sinatra with the Tommy Dorsey Band on January 15, 1941 and it charted in July 1943 when it was reissued reaching the No. 3 position. Glenn Miller, Chet Baker in 1956, and Vera Lynn made recordings of it too. June Christy included the song in her album Fair and Warmer! (1957) and Frank Sinatra recorded it again on May 3, 1961 and it was issued as a single by Reprise.
