= This Time of Year =

Studio album by June Christy
- Released: 1961
- Recorded: January 1961
- Studio: Capitol (Hollywood)
- Genre: Vocal jazz, Christmas music
- Label: Capitol
- Producer: Bill Miller

June Christy chronology
Do-Re-Mi (1961)	This Time of Year (1961)	Big Band Specials (1962)

Professional ratings
Review scores
Source	Rating
AllMusic	4/5 stars
The Encyclopedia of Popular Music	3/5 stars

This Time of Year is a 1961 Christmas album by American jazz vocalist June Christy, arranged and conducted by Pete Rugolo and released by Capitol Records.

Christy's only Christmas album, it consists entirely of original songs, unusual for its time. The recordings bear a similarity of having a melancholy tone to the album, all composed by the husband-and-wife songwriting team of Connie Pearce and Arnold Miller.

== Critical reception ==
AllMusic called the album "unjustly neglected," writing that it "is that rarest of things -- a winter concept album of all new material that can be listened to even when the holidays are over."

Record collector Tim Neely, author of several Goldmine record collector guides, said in 2023 it was a "largely ignored Christmas album until the 1990s, when [The Merriest] became something of a staple on both easy-listening and jazz-oriented CD compilations. Even with that exposure, it didn’t really catch on."

CDs includingThe Merriest include:

- ”Ultra Lounge: Christmas Cocktails Part 2” Capitol 1997
- "A Swingin' Christmas" EMI Capitol Music 1999
- "yule b' swingin' too" Hip-O 2000
- "A Capital Christmas" Capitol Records 2018

== Track listing ==
1. "Christmas Heart" – 2:57
2. "Ring a Merry Bell" – 3:05
3. "Hang Them on the Tree" – 2:21
4. "The Little Star" – 3:08
5. "The Merriest" – 2:09
6. "This Time of Year" – 3:34
7. "Seven Shades of Snow" – 3:32
8. "Sorry to See You Go" – 2:24
9. "The Magic Gift" – 3:26
10. "Winter's Got Spring Up Its Sleeve" – 2:36

All compositions by Connie Pearce and Arnold Miller.

== Personnel ==
- June Christy – vocals
- Frank Beach – trumpet
- Don Fagerquist – trumpet
- Dick Nash – trombone
- Kenny Shroyer – bass trombone
- Jim Decker – French horn
- Vincent DeRosa – French horn
- Richard Perissi – French horn
- Red Callender – tuba
- Sam Rice – tuba
- Bob Cooper – tenor saxophone, bass clarinet, oboe
- Bud Shank – alto saxophone, flute
- Paul Horn – flute
- Ted Nash – flute
- Victor Arno – violin
- Israel Baker – violin
- Robert Barene – violin
- Anatol Kaminsky – violin
- Dan Lube – violin
- Alfred Lustgarten – violin
- Lou Raderman – violin
- Albert Steinberg – violin
- Gerald Vinci – violin
- Virginia Majewski – viola
- Ray Mehennick – viola
- Stanley Harris – viola
- Edgar Lustgarten – cello
- Eleanor Slatkin – cello
- Catherine Gotthoffer – harp
- Russ Freeman – piano
- Al Viola – guitar
- Joe Mondragon – bass
- Red Mitchell – bass
- Gene Estes – drums, vibes, celeste, bell
- Shelly Manne – drums

Tracks 1, 4, 6 Recorded Capitol Tower, Hollywood, 12 January 1961

Tracks 7, 9, 10 Recorded Capitol Tower, Hollywood, 19 January 1961

Tracks 2, 3, 5, 8 Recorded Capitol Tower, Hollywood, 23 January 1961
