= Goodbye (Gordon Jenkins song) =

"Goodbye" (sometimes written "Good-Bye") is a song by American composer and arranger Gordon Jenkins, published in 1935. It became well known as the closing theme song of the Benny Goodman orchestra.

Jenkins had written the song when working with the Isham Jones orchestra, and Jones allegedly rejected it as it was "too sad". Music critic Alec Wilder described "Goodbye" as "as sad a song I know" and Leonard Feather called it among his "top ten songs it would be hardest to tire of hearing".

== Origin ==
Jenkins' son, the sportswriter Bruce Jenkins, wrote a biography of his father entitled Goodbye: In Search of Gordon Jenkins. While researching the biography, Jenkins interviewed the singer Martha Tilton, who had performed with the Benny Goodman orchestra. Tilton revealed that the song was written by Jenkins after the death of his first wife in childbirth.

== Recordings ==
The song was used as the closing theme for radio broadcasts by the Benny Goodman orchestra. They recorded it on September 27, 1935, and that was issued as Victor 25215 on January 8, 1936.

Upon Goodman's death in 1986, Richard Stoltzman commissioned an arrangement of "Goodbye" by Bill Jenkins for clarinet and strings. The resulting "Goodbye: In Memory of Benny" was recorded by Stoltzman and London Symphony Orchestra under the direction of Michael Tilson Thomas in 1992. Another arrangement in tribute to Benny Goodman has also been recorded by Sabine Meyer.

Goodbye was also recorded by Frank Sinatra for his 1958 album, Frank Sinatra Sings for Only the Lonely, and Ella Fitzgerald for her 1982 album The Best Is Yet to Come. Sinatra and Fitzgerald's versions were both arranged by Nelson Riddle.

- Frank Sinatra - Frank Sinatra Sings for Only the Lonely (1958)
- Julie London - Julie...At Home (1960)
- Julian "Cannonball" Adderley and Bill Evans - Know What I Mean? (Riverside, 1961)
- June Christy - Big Band Specials (1962)
- Clare Fischer - Easy Livin' (1963)
- Donna Hightower - I'm In Love with Love (recorded for Columbia in Spain, released also as "I'm in Love with You" and "The One I Cried") (1974)
- Ella Fitzgerald - The Best Is Yet to Come (Pablo, 1982)
- Linda Ronstadt with Nelson Riddle - What's New (1983)
- Richard Stoltzman - New York Counterpoint (RCA, 1987)
- Eddie Henderson - Flight of Mind (Steeplechase, 1991)
- Lizz Wright - Salt (Verve, 2003)
- Jesse Van Ruller - Live at Murphy's Law (55 Records, 2004)
- Charlie Haden Quartet West, with Diana Krall as a guest artist - Sophisticated Ladies (EmArcy, 2010)
- Keith Jarrett / Charlie Haden - Jasmine (album) (ECM, 2010)
