= Something Broadway, Something Latin =

Studio album by June Christy
- Released: 1965
- Genre: Vocal jazz
- Label: Capitol
- Producer: Bill Miller

June Christy chronology
The Intimate Miss Christy (1963)	Something Broadway, Something Latin (1965)	Impromptu (1977)

Something Broadway, Something Latin is an album by June Christy that was released in 1965 on Capitol as ST-2410. A bonus track was added to the CD. In 2009 the album was reissued as a double-CD with Jeri Southern's 1959 album Jeri Southern Meets Cole Porter.

== Track listing ==
1. "Do I Hear a Waltz?" (Richard Rodgers, Stephen Sondheim) - 2:18
2. "Long Ago" (David Heneker) - 2:23
3. "Come Back to Me" (Burton Lane, Alan Jay Lerner) - 2:00
4. "Here's That Rainy Day" (Jimmy Van Heusen, Johnny Burke) - 2:36
5. "He Touched Me" (Milton Schafer, Ira Levin) - 2:34
6. "The Shadow of Your Smile (Love Theme from The Sandpiper)" (Johnny Mandel, Paul Francis Webster) - 2:56
7. "Gimme Some" (Charles Strouse, Lee Adams) - 2:07
8. "What Did I Have That I Don't Have?" (Lane, Lerner)
9. "Run for Your Life!" (Van Heusen, Sammy Cahn)
10. "Tell Me More" (Morton Jacobs, Dok Stanford)
11. "Cast Your Fate to the Wind" (Vince Guaraldi, Carel Werber)

Bonus track

1. "One Note Samba (Samba de Uma Nota So)" (Antônio Carlos Jobim, Newton Mendonça)

== Personnel ==
- June Christy – vocals
- Ernie Freeman – piano, arranger, conductor

Tracks 1, 4, 7, 10

- Tom Shepard – trombone
- Lew McCreary – trombone
- Lou Blackburn – trombone
- Kenny Shroyer – bass trombone
- Wilbur Schwartz – reeds
- Bob Cooper – reeds
- William Green – reeds
- Ray Sherman – piano
- John Gray – guitar
- Al Viola – guitar
- Bill Pitman – guitar
- Red Callender – bass
- Hal Blaine – drums
- Emil Richards – percussion, vibraphone

Recorded Capitol Tower, Hollywood 20 May 1965

Tracks 3, 8, 9, 11

- Lew McCreary – trombone
- Bob Enevoldsen – trombone
- Dave Wells – trombone
- Kenny Shroyer – bass trombone
- Bud Shank – alto saxophone, flute
- Ronnie Lang – reeds
- Bob Cooper – reeds
- Gene Cipriano – reeds
- Gene Garf – piano
- Louis Morell – guitar
- John Gray – guitar
- Al McKibbon – bass
- Earl Palmer – drums
- Julius Wechter – mallets, bongo drums, tympani

Recorded Capitol Tower, Hollywood 31 August 1965

Tracks 2, 5, 6

- Bud Shank – alto saxophone, flute
- Gene Garf – piano
- Al Viola – guitar
- Louis Morell – guitar
- Red Callender – bass
- Hal Blaine – drums
- Emil Richards – percussion, vibraphone

Recorded Capitol Tower, Hollywood 3 September 1965

Track 12

- June Christy – vocal
- Bob Cooper's Orchestra
- Bob Cooper – arranger, conductor
- Dan Lube, Erno Neufeld, Lou Raderman, Sam Freed, Felix Slatkin, George Kast, Bob Barene, Nathan Kaproff – strings
- Ronnie Lang – flute
- Emil Richards – vibraphone
- Laurindo Almeida – guitar
- Joe Mondragon – bass
- Shelly Manne – drums
- Milt Holland – percussion

Recorded Capitol Tower, Hollywood, 4 October 1962
