= Duet (Stan Kenton and June Christy album) =

Studio album by June Christy and Stan Kenton
- Released: 1955
- Recorded: May 7, 9 & 19, 1955; Capitol Recording Studios, Melrose Avenue, Hollywood, CA
- Genre: Jazz
- Length: 40:11
- Label: Capitol T 656
- Producer: Bill Miller

Stan Kenton chronology
The Kenton Era (1955)	Duet (1955)	Contemporary Concepts (1955)

June Christy chronology
Something Cool (1955)	Duet (1955)	The Misty Miss Christy (1956)

Duet is an album by vocalist June Christy and pianist Stan Kenton with featuring performances of jazz standards recorded in 1955 and released on the Capitol label.

== Reception ==
Professional ratings
Review scores
Source	Rating
Allmusic	4/5 stars
The Penguin Guide to Jazz Recordings	3/4 stars

The Allmusic review by Stephen Cook noted "Kenton exercises unexpected restraint throughout, shading Christy's dramatically cool delivery with snatches of Ellington color and chamber music formality".

== Track listing ==
1. "Ev'ry Time We Say Goodbye" (Cole Porter) – 3:48
2. "Lonely Woman" (Benny Carter, Ray Sonin) – 5:54
3. "Just the Way I Am" (Bobby Troup) – 3:52
4. "You're Mine, You" (Johnny Green, Edward Heyman) – 3:10
5. "Angel Eyes" (Matt Dennis, Earl Brent) – 4:19
6. "Come to the Party" (Joe Greene) – 3:09
7. "Baby, Baby All the Time" (Troup) – 2:20
8. "We Kiss in a Shadow" (Richard Rodgers, Oscar Hammerstein II) – 1:54
9. "How Long Has This Been Going On?" (George Gershwin, Ira Gershwin) – 4:56
10. "Prelude to a Kiss" (Duke Ellington, Irving Gordon, Irving Mills) – 3:40 Bonus track on CD reissue
11. "Thanks for You" (Bernie Hanighen, Marvin Wright) – 3:09 Bonus track on CD reissue
- Recorded at Capitol Studios in Hollywood, CA on May 7, 1955 (track 8–10), May 9, 1955 (tracks 2, 3 and 5–7) and May 19, 1955 (tracks 1, 4 and 9)

== Personnel ==
- June Christy – vocals
- Stan Kenton – piano
