= Impromptu (June Christy album) =

Studio album by June Christy
- Released: 1977
- Recorded: June 7–9, 1977
- Genre: Vocal jazz
- Length: 41:26
- Label: Interplay
- Producer: Albert Marx

June Christy chronology
Something Broadway, Something Latin (1965)	Impromptu (1977)

Impromptu is the final album by June Christy, recorded in 1977 and featuring the Lou Levy Sextet.

== Track listing ==
1. "My Shining Hour" (Harold Arlen, Johnny Mercer) – 3:20
2. "Once Upon a Summertime" (Michel Legrand, Mercer) – 4:47
3. "Show Me" (Frederick Loewe, Alan Jay Lerner) – 2:23
4. "Everything Must Change" (Bernard Ighner) – 6:09
5. "Willow Weep for Me" (Ann Ronell) – 4:17
6. "I'll Remember April" (Gene de Paul, Patricia Johnston, Don Raye) – 3:48
7. "The Trouble With Hello is Goodbye" (Dave Grusin, Alan and Marilyn Bergman) – 3:56
8. "Autumn Serenade" (Peter DeRose, Sammy Gallop) – 3:57
9. "Sometime Ago" (Sergio Mihanovich) – 4:08
10. "Angel Eyes" (Matt Dennis, Earl Brent) – 4:41

== Personnel ==
- June Christy – vocals
- Lou Levy – piano
- Jack Sheldon – trumpet
- Frank Rosolino – trombone
- Bob Cooper – tenor saxophone, flute
- Bob Daugherty – bass
- Shelly Manne – drums

Recorded at United/Western Studios, Los Angeles, California 7, 8 & 9 June 1977
