= June's Got Rhythm =

Studio album by June Christy
- Released: 1958
- Studio: Capitol Studios, Los Angeles, California
- Genre: Jazz
- Length: 42:53
- Label: Capitol Records
- Producer: Bill Miller

June's Got Rhythm is a 1958 studio album by cool jazz singer June Christy, produced by Bill Miller and arranged and conducted by Bob Cooper, June's husband. It was released by Capitol Records on a vinyl LP record. It was recorded at Capitol Studios in Los Angeles, California.

== Track listing ==
1. "Rock Me to Sleep" (Benny Carter, Paul Vandervoort ll) - 2:23
2. "Gypsy in My Soul" (Clay Boland, Moe Jaffe) - 3:16
3. "I'm Glad There Is You (In This World of Ordinary People)" (Paul Maderia, Jimmy Dorsey) - 2:40
4. "They Can't Take That Away From Me" (George & Ira Gershwin) - 2:43
5. "It Don't Mean a Thing (If It Ain't Got That Swing)" (Duke Ellington, Irving Mills) - 1:54
6. "My One and Only Love" (Guy Wood, Robert Mellin) - 2:46
7. "When Lights Are Low" (Benny Carter, Spencer Williams) - 2:56
8. "I Can Make You Love Me (If You Let Me)" (Bob Russell, Peter de Rose) - 3:33
9. "Easy Living" (Leo Robin, Ralph Rainger) - 4:17
10. "Blue Moon" (Richard Rodgers, Lorenz Hart) - 3:14
11. "All God's Chillun Got Rhythm" (Bronislaw Kaper, Walter Jurmann, Gus Kahn) - 2:15
