= Do-Re-Mi (June Christy and Bob Cooper album) =

Studio album by June Christy and Bob Cooper
- Released: 1961
- Recorded: 6 February 1961
- Studio: Capitol (Hollywood)
- Genre: Jazz, Vocal jazz
- Length: 33:19
- Label: Capitol
- Producer: Bill Miller

June Christy chronology
Off-Beat (1960)	Do-Re-Mi (1961)	This Time of Year (1961)

Bob Cooper chronology
Blowin' Country (1959)	Do-Re-Mi (1961)	Tenor Sax Jazz Impressions (1979)

Professional ratings
Review scores
Source	Rating
Allmusic	4/5 stars

Do-Re-Mi is a 1961 jazz album by June Christy and Bob Cooper, consisting of selections from the Broadway musical Do Re Mi, written by Jule Styne, Betty Comden and Adolf Green. Half the tunes are sung by Christy, backed by Cooper and an instrumental group, the other half played by Cooper leading an instrumental group with mostly different personnel.

The album was re-issued on a double-CD in 2006, together with The Cool School.

== Track listing ==
1. "Cry Like the Wind"
2. "Adventure" (instrumental)
3. "Make Someone Happy"
4. "Ambition" (instrumental)
5. "All You Need Is a Quarter"
6. "All of My Life" (instrumental)
7. "I Know About Love"
8. "Fireworks" (instrumental)
9. "Asking for You"
10. "It’s Legitimate" (instrumental)

All vocal compositions by Jule Styne, Betty Comden and Adolf Green; all instrumental compositions by Jule Styne.

== Personnel ==
- June Christy - vocals (tracks 1, 3, 5, 7, 9)
- Conte Candoli - trumpet (tracks 2, 4, 6, 8, 10)
- Joe Gordon - trumpet (tracks 1, 3, 5, 7, 9)
- Frank Rosolino - trombone (tracks 2, 4, 6, 8, 10)
- Vincent DeRosa - French horn (tracks 1, 3, 5, 7, 9; also one or more of tracks 2, 4, 6, 8, 10)
- William Hinshaw - French horn (one or more of tracks 2, 4, 6, 8, 10)
- Norman Benno - oboe (tracks 1, 3, 5, 7, 9)
- Bob Cooper - tenor saxophone, oboe, arranger (all tracks)
- Buddy Collette - tenor saxophone, baritone saxophone, bass clarinet (tracks 1, 3, 5, 7, 9; also one or more of tracks 2, 4, 6, 8, 10)
- Jack Nimitz - baritone saxophone (one or more of tracks 2, 4, 6, 8, 10)
- Bud Shank - alto saxophone, flute (all tracks)
- Kathryn Julye - harp (tracks 1, 3, 5, 7, 9)
- Al Viola - guitar (all tracks)
- Pete Jolly - piano (tracks 2, 4, 6, 8, 10)
- Monty Budwig - bass (tracks 1, 3, 5, 7)
- Buddy Clark - bass (track 9; possibly replacing Monty Budwig on others)
- Joe Mondragon - bass (tracks 2, 4, 6, 8, 10)
- Mel Lewis - drums (tracks 2, 4, 6, 8, 10)
- Shelly Manne - drums (tracks 1, 3, 5, 7, 9)

Recorded Capitol Tower, Los Angeles, California, 6 February 1961. (The instrumentals and possibly one or more vocals were recorded on an unknown date, probably also in February 1961.)
