= The Misty Miss Christy =

1956 studio album by June Christy

Studio album by June Christy
- Released: July 30, 1956
- Recorded: July 26, 1955; January 9, 16, 23, 30, and May 23, 1956
- Genre: Vocal jazz
- Length: 37:55
- Label: Capitol

June Christy chronology
Duet (1955)	The Misty Miss Christy (1956)	Fair and Warmer! (1957)

Professional ratings
Review scores
Source	Rating
Allmusic	4.5/5 stars

The Misty Miss Christy is a 1956 studio album by June Christy. Christy sings several jazz standards, along with a few lesser-known tunes. Pete Rugolo arranged the songs and conducted the orchestra, which consisted of different combinations of musicians on different recording dates, with some overlap. The album was released on Capitol Records and reissued on Discovery Records. The CD was released on Blue Note Records.

== Track listing ==
1. "That's All" (Alan Brandt, Bob Haymes) – 3:25
2. "I Didn't Know About You" (Duke Ellington, Bob Russell) – 2:54
3. "Day Dream" (Ellington, Billy Strayhorn, John La Touche) – 2:59
4. "Sing Something Simple" (Herman Hupfeld) – 2:13
5. "Maybe You'll Be There" (Rube Bloom, Sammy Gallop) – 2:52
6. "Dearly Beloved" (Jerome Kern, Johnny Mercer) – 1:36
7. "'Round Midnight" (Thelonious Monk, Bernie Hanighen, Cootie Williams) – 4:58
8. "A Lovely Way to Spend an Evening" (Jimmy McHugh, Harold Adamson) – 2:22
9. "The Wind" (Russ Freeman, Jerry Gladstone) – 3:49
10. "This Year's Kisses" (Irving Berlin) – 2:01
11. "For All We Know" (J. Fred Coots, Sam M. Lewis) – 2:50
12. "There's No You" (Tom Adair, Harold Hopper) 2:12
13. "You Took Advantage of Me" (Richard Rodgers, Lorenz Hart) (bonus track on 1992 CD reissue only) – 2:29
14. "Intrigue" (Paul Durand, Ervin Drake) (bonus track on 1992 CD reissue only) – 2:19

== Personnel ==
- June Christy – vocals
- Pete Rugolo – arranger
- Pete Candoli – trumpet (tracks 2, 6, 8, 13, 14)
- Maynard Ferguson – trumpet (tracks 13, 14)
- Conrad Gozzo – trumpet (tracks 13, 14)
- John Graas – French horn (tracks 1, 3–5, 7, 9–12)
- Milt Bernhart – trombone (tracks 1, 3, 4, 7, 9, 13, 14)
- Harry Betts – trombone (tracks 2, 6, 8, 13, 14)
- Herbie Harper – trombone (tracks 2, 6, 8, 13, 14)
- Dick Noel – trombone (tracks 2, 6, 8)
- George Roberts – trombone (tracks 2, 6, 8, 13, 14)
- Frank Rosolino – trombone (tracks 1, 3, 7, 9, 12)
- Harry Klee – alto saxophone, flute (tracks 2, 6, 8, 13, 14)
- Bud Shank – alto saxophone, flute (tracks 1, 3–5, 7, 9–14)
- Bob Cooper – tenor saxophone (tracks 1, 3–5, 7, 9–14)
- Chuck Gentry – baritone saxophone (tracks 13, 14)
- Bob Gordon – baritone saxophone (tracks 6, 8)
- Corky Hale – harp (tracks 5, 10–12)
- Ann Mason Stockton – harp (tracks 1, 3, 7, 9)
- Bernie Mattison – vibraharp (tracks 1, 3–5, 7, 9–12)
- Laurindo Almeida – guitar (tracks 2, 6, 8)
- Howard Roberts – guitar (tracks 1, 3–5, 7, 9–14)
- Benny Aronov – piano (tracks 13, 14)
- Claude Williamson – piano (tracks 1–4, 6–9)
- Harry Babasin – bass (tracks 2, 6, 8)
- Joe Mondragon – bass (tracks 1, 3–5, 7, 9–14)
- Larry Bunker – drums, percussion (tracks 2, 6, 8, 13, 14)
- Shelly Manne – drums (tracks 1, 3–5, 7, 9–12)
- Alvin Stoller – drums (tracks 13, 14)
