= The Intimate Miss Christy =

Studio album by June Christy
- Released: 1963
- Recorded: September 16, 1960 – May, 1963
- Genre: Vocal jazz
- Length: 39:07
- Label: Capitol/EMI
- Producer: Bill Miller

June Christy chronology
Best of June Christy (1962)	The Intimate Miss Christy (1963)	Something Broadway, Something Latin (1965)

Professional ratings
Review scores
Source	Rating
Record Mirror	4/5 stars

The Intimate Miss Christy is a 1963 album by June Christy. It was remastered and reissued in 2006 with two bonus songs.

== Track listing ==
1. "Spring Is Here" (Richard Rodgers, Lorenz Hart) – 3:02
2. "Fly Me to the Moon" (Bart Howard) – 3:14
3. "I Fall in Love Too Easily" (Jule Styne, Sammy Cahn) – 2:29
4. "Time After Time" (Styne, Cahn) – 2:22
5. "The More I See You" (Harry Warren, Mack Gordon) – 3:03
6. "Don't Explain" (Billie Holiday, Arthur Herzog Jr.) – 2:37
7. "It Never Entered My Mind" (Rodgers, Hart) – 3:30
8. "You're Nearer" (Rodgers, Hart) – 2:54
9. "Misty" (Erroll Garner, Johnny Burke) – 3:05
10. "Suddenly It's Spring" (Jimmy Van Heusen, Burke) – 2:43
11. "I Get Along Without You Very Well" (Hoagy Carmichael) – 3:08
12. "Ev'ry Time" (Hugh Martin, Ralph Blane) – 3:21

Bonus Tracks (on the 2006 re-release)

1. "Sometimes I'm Happy" (Vincent Youmans, Irving Caesar) – 1:35
2. "Tommy, Tommy" (Jerry Bock, Sheldon Harnick) – 1:41

== Personnel ==
- June Christy – vocals
- Al Viola – guitar
- Don Bagley – bass
- Bud Shank – flute
- Jonah Jones – trumpet
- Teddy Brannon – piano
- George Foster – drums
