= Coop! The Music of Bob Cooper =

Studio album by Bob Cooper
- Released: 1958
- Recorded: August 26 & 27, 1957
- Studio: Contemporary Records Studio, Los Angeles, California
- Genre: Jazz
- Length: 44:45
- Label: Contemporary C3544/S7544
- Producer: Lester Koenig

Bob Cooper chronology
Flute 'n Oboe (1957)	Coop! The Music of Bob Cooper (1958)	The Swing's to TV (1958)

Coop! The Music of Bob Cooper is an album by saxophonist Bob Cooper recorded in 1957 and released on the Contemporary label.

== Reception ==
Professional ratings
Review scores
Source	Rating
Allmusic	4.5/5 stars

The Allmusic review by Scott Yanow states: "a near-classic and one of his finest recordings... This set is an underrated gem".

== Track listing ==
All compositions by Bob Cooper except as indicated

1. "Jazz Theme and Four Variations"
  1. "Main Theme: Sunday Mood" - 4:04
  2. "1st Variation: A Blue Period" - 4:09
  3. "2nd Variation: Happy Changes" - 4:03
  4. "3rd Variation: Night Stroll" - 6:38
  5. "4th Variation: Saturday Dance" - 4:42
2. "Confirmation" (Charlie Parker) - 4:18
3. "Easy Living" (Ralph Rainger, Leo Robin) - 4:19
4. "Frankie and Johnny" (Traditional) - 5:50
5. "Day Dream" (Duke Ellington, Billy Strayhorn) - 3:25
6. "Somebody Loves Me" (George Gershwin, Ballard MacDonald, Buddy DeSylva) - 3:19

== Personnel ==
- Bob Cooper - tenor saxophone
- Frank Rosolino - trombone
- Lou Levy - piano
- Max Bennett - bass
- Mel Lewis - drums
- Conte Candoli, Pete Candoli, Don Fagerquist - trumpet (track 1.1–1.4)
- Johnny Halliburton - trombone (track 1.1–1.4)
- Victor Feldman - vibraphone (tracks 2–6)
