= Blowin' Country =

Studio album by Bud Shank and Bob Cooper
- Released: 1958
- Recorded: November 29, 1956 and February 18, 1958; Capitol Studios in Hollywood, CA
- Genre: Jazz
- Length: 54:52
- Label: World Pacific WP-1277
- Producer: Russ Freeman

Bob Cooper chronology
The Swing's to TV (1958)	Blowin' Country (1958)	Do-Re-Mi (1961)

Bud Shank chronology
The Swing's to TV (1958)	Blowin' Country (1958)	Holiday in Brazil (1958)

Blowin' Country is an album by saxophonists Bud Shank and Bob Cooper released on the World Pacific label. The majority of the album's tracks were recorded in 1958, with one track from 1956 on the original album, and the CD reissue added five bonus tracks from the two sessions.

== Reception ==
Professional ratings
Review scores
Source	Rating
AllMusic	4.5/5 stars

The AllMusic review by Scott Yanow states: "Shank and Cooper display distinctive but complementary styles, and their tripling on woodwinds gives plenty of variety to the date. Cooper's oboe playing, which preceded Yusef Lateef's, in particular is a joy. Highly recommended". On the All About Jazz website, Jack Bowers observed "these two masters offer a comprehensive clinic in good old–fashioned swinging... Multi–instrumentalists Shank and Cooper let it all hang out, skipping comfortably through a colorful program that consists mostly of standards... Shank and Cooper know how to make every note count, and their solos, while perhaps briefer than one might wish, are always inspiring."

== Track listing ==
1. "Dinah" (Harry Akst, Sam M. Lewis, Joe Young) - 3:18
2. "Mutual Admiration Society" (Matt Dubey, Harry Karr) - 3:45
3. "Steve Allen Theme" (Steve Allen) - 4:08
4. "I've Grown Accustomed to Her Face" (Frederick Loewe, Alan Jay Lerner) - 2:42
5. "Blowin' Country" (Bud Shank) - 6:15
6. "Love Nest" (Louis Hirsch, Otto Harbach) - 3:13
7. "As Long as There's Music" (Jule Styne, Sammy Cahn) - 3:41
8. "Just in Time" (Styne, Betty Comden, Adolph Green) - 3:42
9. "Two Lost Souls" (Richard Adler, Jerry Ross) - 3:44
10. "Thanks for the Memory" (Ralph Rainger, Leo Robin) - 4:30 bonus track on CD reissue
11. "A Romantic Guy, I" (Del Sharbutt) - 3:34 bonus track on CD reissue
12. "Sweet Georgia Brown" (Kenneth Casey, Maceo Pinkard) - 3:41
13. "The Gypsy in My Soul" (Clay Boland, Moe Jaffe) - 3:23 bonus track on CD reissue
14. "I Want to Be Happy" (Vincent Youmans, Irving Caesar) - 2:31 bonus track on CD reissue
15. "What'll I Do?" (Irving Berlin) - 2:45 bonus track on CD reissue
- Recorded at Capitol Studios in Hollywood, CA on November 29, 1956 (tracks 12–15) and February 18, 1958 (tracks 1–11)

== Personnel ==
- Bud Shank - alto saxophone, flute
- Bob Cooper - tenor saxophone, oboe
- Howard Roberts - guitar (tracks 12–15)
- Claude Williamson - piano (tracks 1–11)
- Don Prell - bass
- Chuck Flores - drums
