= Bud Shank Plays Tenor =

Studio album by Bud Shank
- Released: 1960
- Recorded: November 29, 1957
- Studio: Capitol (Hollywood)
- Genre: Jazz
- Label: Pacific Jazz; PJ 4
- Producer: Richard Bock

Bud Shank chronology
Flute 'n Oboe (1956)	Bud Shank Plays Tenor (1960)	The Swing's to TV (1958)

Bud Shank Plays Tenor is an album by saxophonist Bud Shank recorded in late 1957 for the Pacific Jazz label.

== Reception ==
Professional ratings
Review scores
Source	Rating
AllMusic	3.5/5 stars

In a review for AllMusic, Jason Ankeney wrote: "the leap to tenor doesn't dramatically impact his overall sound and style, it does add soul and depth to his lyrical solos".

== Track listing ==
1. "Thou Swell" (Richard Rodgers, Lorenz Hart) - 6:40
2. "Tenderly" (Walter Gross, Jack Lawrence) - 7:50
3. "Over the Rainbow" (Harold Arlen, Yip Harburg) - 4:21
4. "Long Ago (and Far Away)" (Ralph Rainger, Leo Robin) - 4:51
5. "I Never Knew" (Ted Fio Rito, Sammy Kahn) - 6:31
6. "All the Things You Are" (Oscar Hammerstein II, Jerome Kern) - 4:52
7. "Body and Soul" (Johnny Green, Edward Heyman, Robert Sour, Frank Eyton) - 5:09
8. "Blue Lou" (Irving Mills, Edgar Sampson) - 5:45

== Personnel ==
- Bud Shank - tenor saxophone
- Claude Williamson - piano
- Don Prell - bass
- Chuck Flores - drums
