= Flute 'n Oboe =

Studio album by Bud Shank and Bob Cooper
- Released: 1957
- Recorded: November 29, 1956
- Studio: Capitol (Hollywood)
- Genre: Jazz
- Label: Pacific Jazz; PJ 1226
- Producer: Richard Bock

Bob Cooper chronology
Shifting Winds (1955)	Flute 'n Oboe (1957)	Coop! The Music of Bob Cooper (1957)

Bud Shank chronology
Theme Music from "The James Dean Story" (1956)	Flute 'n Oboe (1956)	Bud Shank Plays Tenor (1957)

Flute 'n Oboe (full title The Flute and the Oboe of Bud Shank and Bob Cooper) is an album by Bud Shank and Bob Cooper recorded in November 1956 for the Pacific Jazz label.

== Reception ==
Professional ratings
Review scores
Source	Rating
AllMusic	3/5 stars
Disc	1/5 stars

AllMusic rated the album with three stars.

== Track listing ==
All compositions by Bob Cooper, except as indicated.

1. "They Didn't Believe Me" (Jerome Kern, Herbert Reynolds) - 4:40
2. "Gypsy in My Soul" (Clay Boland, Moe Jaffe) - 3:23
3. "In the Blue of Evening" (Al D'Artega, Tom Adair) - 3:37
4. "I Want to Be Happy" (Vincent Youmans, Irving Caesar) - 2:32
5. "Tequila Time" - 4:18
6. "I Can't Get Started" (Vernon Duke, Ira Gershwin) - 4:20
7. "Blues for Delilah" - 7:00
8. "Sunset and Wine" - 4:11
9. "What'll I Do" (Irving Berlin) - 2:47

== Personnel ==
- Bud Shank - flute
- Bob Cooper - oboe, arranger, conductor
- Howard Roberts - guitar
- Don Prell - bass
- Chuck Flores - drums
- Eudice Shapiro, Ben Gill - violin (tracks 1, 3 & 5–8)
- Milt Thomas - viola (tracks 1, 3 & 5–8)
- Ray Kramer - cello (tracks 1, 3 & 5–8)
