= Off-Beat =

Studio album by June Christy
- Released: 1960
- Recorded: August 1960
- Studio: Capitol (Hollywood)
- Genre: Vocal jazz
- Label: Capitol
- Producer: Bill Miller

June Christy chronology
The Cool School (1960)	Off-Beat (1960)	Do-Re-Mi (1961)

Professional ratings
Review scores
Source	Rating
AllMusic	4/5 stars
The Encyclopedia of Popular Music	3/5 stars

Off-Beat is a 1960 album by American jazz vocalist June Christy, arranged and conducted by Pete Rugolo.

The tracks on the album were included on a 1997 double-CD re-issue under the title The Song Is June!

== Critical reception ==
AllMusic wrote that "Pete Rugolo's typically unusual and surprising arrangements inspire the singer and make this a fairly memorable (if not famous) outing." Jazz Times, in a review of the album's reissue, wrote that "despite their vocal limitations, these performances are hauntingly expressive mementos of an artist who never gave less than her all, and is fondly remembered by a host of devotees."

== Track listing ==
1. “Remind Me” (Jerome Kern, Dorothy Fields)
2. “Out of This World” (Harold Arlen, Johnny Mercer)
3. “You Wear Love So Well” (George Handy, Jack Segal)
4. “Off Beat” (Leon Pober)
5. “The Bad and the Beautiful” (David Raksin, Dory Langdon)
6. “Who Cares About April?” (Ken Hanna, Hank Levy)
7. “You Say You Care” (Jule Styne, Leo Robin)
8. “Out of the Shadows” (Pete Rugolo, Bobby Troup)
9. “A Sleepin' Bee” (Harold Arlen, Truman Capote)
10. “Somewhere (If Not in Heaven)” (Kenny Burrell)

== Personnel ==
Tracks 3, 5, 6, 8 and 10

- June Christy - vocals
- woodwinds including Bud Shank - also saxophone, flute
- Bob Cooper - tenor saxophone, oboe
- Larry Bunker - vibraphone
- Pete Rugolo - arranger, conductor
- string quartet

Recorded Capitol Tower, Hollywood, California, August 8, 1960

Tracks 1, 2, 4, 7 and 9

- June Christy - vocals
- trumpets including Don Fagerquist
- trombones including Frank Rosolino
- French horns
- woodwinds including Bud Shank - alto saxophone, flute
- Bob Cooper - tenor saxophone, oboe
- Joe Castro - piano
- Pete Rugolo - arranger, conductor

Recorded Capitol Tower, Hollywood, California, 19 August 1960
