= Anime Candide =

Studio album by Daniele Sepe
- Released: September 30, 2003
- Recorded: October 1999–November 2002
- Genre: World
- Length: 57:13
- Label: Dunya
- Producer: Daniele Sepe

Daniele Sepe chronology
Senza Filtro (2002)	Anime Candide (2003)

Professional ratings
Review scores
Source	Rating
Allmusic	3/5 stars

Anime Candide is a 2003 album by Daniele Sepe.

== Track listing ==
All songs by Sepe unless noted

1. "'Ndunielle"
2. "Il Lupo E l'Agnelle"
3. "Anime Candide" (Lacobeli, Sepe)
4. "Ce Me Pe Ti Zog?"
5. "Valse Pour Marlene"
6. "Sammuchella" (Ririani)
7. "Amuri"
8. "Valse Bomba"
9. "Preludio" (Ricci)
10. "Canson d'Amour" (Iacobelli, Sepe)
11. "L' Uccello de Fuocco"
12. "Asi Como Matan los Negros" (Neruda, Ortega)
13. "Ronda da Marraficas" (Afonso)
14. "Menina Estas a Janela" (Vitorino)
15. "Happy End"
