= Chuck Flores =

American jazz drummer (1935–2016)

Charles Walter "Chuck" Flores (January 5, 1935 – November 24, 2016) was an American jazz drummer. One of the relatively small number of musicians associated with West Coast jazz who were actually from the West Coast, Flores was born in Orange, California, and grew up in Santa Ana. He is best known for the work he did with saxophonist Bud Shank in the 1950s, and for his two-year stint with Woody Herman, from 1954 to 1955, but also performed and recorded with such musicians as Carmen McRae, Art Pepper, Maynard Ferguson, Al Cohn, and Shelly Manne, who had been his drum teacher. Manne and others considered Flores an underrated drummer.

In later years, Flores became a highly sought after and renowned educator whose students included Danny Seraphine, Chad Wackerman, John Wackerman, Brooks Wackerman, Ray Mehlbaum, Pete Parada, Jamie Wollam, Jose Ruiz, and Zack Stewart. Flores was a longtime faculty member at Musicians Institute in Los Angeles.

== Discography ==
=== As leader ===
- Flores Azules (Dobre, 1976)
- Drum Flower (Concord Jazz, 1977)

=== As sideman ===
With Laurindo Almeida

- Latin Guitar (Dobre, 1976)
- New Directions (Crystal Clear, 1979)
- Virtuoso Guitar (Crystal Clear, 1977)

With Woody Herman

- The Woody Herman Band! Part 1 (Capitol, 1954)
- The Woody Herman Band! Part 2 (Capitol, 1954)
- The Woody Herman Band! Part 3 (Capitol, 1954)
- The Woody Herman Band! (Capitol, 1955)
- Road Band! (Capitol, 1955)
- Blues Groove (Capitol, 1956)
- Jackpot! (Capitol, 1956)
- Hey! Heard the Herd? (Verve, 1963)
- The Third Herd Vol. 2 (Discovery, 1982)

With Art Pepper

- Modern Art (Intro, 1957)
- The Art of Pepper (Omegatape, 1957)
- The Art of Pepper Vol. II (Omegatape, 1958)
- Omega Alpha (Blue Note, 1981)

With Bud Shank

- The Bud Shank Quartet (Pacific Jazz, 1956)
- Jazz at Cal-Tech (Pacific Jazz, 1956)
- Bud Shank Quartet Featuring Claude Williamson (Pacific Jazz, 1957)
- Flute 'n Oboe (Pacific Jazz, 1957)
- The Swing's to TV (World Pacific, 1958)
- Holiday in Brazil (Vogue, 1959)
- Latin Contrasts (World Pacific, 1959)
- Slippery When Wet (World Pacific, 1959)
- Blowin' Country (World Pacific, 1959)
- Bud Shank Plays Tenor (Record Society, 1962)
- Brasamba! (Pacific Jazz, 1963)
- Live at the Haig (Choice, 1985)

With others

- Toshiko Akiyoshi Lew Tabackin Big Band, Long Yellow Road (RCA 1975)
- Conte Candoli, Russ Freeman, Art Pepper, Mucho Calor (Andex, 1958)
- Neshama Carlebach, Soul (Sameach Music, 1996)
- Al Cohn, Bill Perkins, Richie Kamuca, Three of a Kind (RCA 1956)
- Al Cohn, Bill Perkins, Richie Kamuca, The Brothers! (RCA Victor, 1956)
- Dick Collins, Horn of Plenty (RCA, 1955)
- Dick Collins, King Richard the Swing Hearted (RCA Victor, 1955)
- Gil Fuller, Night Flight (Pacific Jazz, 1966)
- Floyd Huddleston, Happy Birthday, Jesus (Dobre, 1977)
- Shelly Manne, The Manne We Love (Eastworld, 1979)
- Dodo Marmarosa & Lorraine Geller, West Coast Piano Touch (Vantage, 1992)
- Carmen McRae, The Great American Songbook (Atlantic, 1972)
- Shorty Rogers, A Live Jam Session Recorded at the Rendezvous Ballroom (Jam Session 1979)
- Cy Touff, His Octet & Quintet (Pacific Jazz, 1956)
- Cy Touff, Keester Parade (Pacific Jazz, 1962)
