= Lou Levy =

Lou Levy may refer to:

- Lou Levy (publisher) (1912–1995), American music publisher who played a key role in the careers of some of the most famous songwriters
- Lou Levy (pianist) (1928–2001), American jazz pianist and session man, best known for his bebop and cool-jazz-based playing style
- Louis Levy (1894–1957), English composer and musical director of Gaumont-British studios
