= Wilhelm Schröter =

- Born: January 16, 1960 (age 66)
- Origin: Rio de Janeiro, Brazil
- Genre: Classical
- Occupations: Composer and pianist
- Instrument: Piano

Wilhelm Schröter is a composer and pianist. Schröter was born in Rio de Janeiro, Brazil, January 16, 1960.

== Biography ==
Schröter was born into a family of musicians. His father, Harry, was a violinist and his mother, Maria Helena Didier Moniz de Aragão do Rego Maciel Schröter, was a pianist and piano teacher. When he was just nine years old Wilhelm started to accompany his aunt Maria Schroeter, a soprano, on piano performing pieces by Franz Schubert and Robert Schumann. He wrote his first composition at age 12.

Schröter began his career in 1975 performing piano recitals at age 15 in Brazil. He graduated with a degree in music in 1988. Schröter no longer tours and now concentrates on composing. He mainly composes classical music, but sometimes experiments with other music genres such as jazz with classical elements, pop, voice and movie themes. He also writes music electronically. He has written approximately 300 works.

He is the cousin of Olga Maria Schröter, a soprano, who is also related to composers Johann Samuel Schröter, his sister Corona Schröter, Leonhart Schröte and Christoph Gottlieb Schröter.

== Awards ==
Schröter received his first award at 16 years of age. His first solo performer with orchestra award came at age 25 (Piano Concerto No. 1 (Chopin)). Schröter participated in many piano competitions to boost his career. He has traveled to the U.S. including Seattle, WA during concert tours. Schröter also visited pianist Sebastian Benda.

- Best Interpretation of Villa-Lobos, Brasília/DF – Brazil – 1976 (16 years old)
- Composition award in São Paulo/SP, 1984
- Winner of the orchestra soloist competition - OSPA/Porto Alegre/RS, 1985
- Semifinals in Internacional Piano Competition in Montevideo - Uruguay, 1985
- 3o. Prize in Chopin national competition in Curitiba/PR - Brazil, 1986
- Masterworks prize (vol. 12 and 13)- With concerto Op.180 No. 3 and Op.209 No. 4.
- Canzonneta for wind quintet op.163 and Nocturne for piano no.12 Selected by Oregon Literary Review, 2006.
- In 1993–1994 he traveled to Germany Master Class with Ceslaw Kacinsky, Jorg Demus, and Peter Rosel
- In 2000–2001 he traveled to the U.S. to perform in recitals
- In Pop Scenario, Schroeter also is receiving recognition for his work. His song "Heaven on Earth", for example, got some awards and nominations in USA and Europe.

== Catalogue ==
- 29 Preludes for Piano op.1
- Sonata for Violin and Piano op.2 no.1
- Infant Suite for Piano op.3 no.1
- Sonatine for Piano op.4
- 6 Ideas for Piano op.5
- Suite for Flute and Piano op.6 no.1
- Sonata for Violin and Piano op.7 no.2
- Impromptu for Piano op.8
- Fantasy for Guitar and Piano op.9
- Fantasy for Cello and Piano op.10
- Music for Violin and Piano op.11
- Fantasy for Clarinet and Piano op.12 No.1
- Fantasy for Piano op.13 no.1
- Brasiliana for Piano op.14
- 3 Themes for Piano op.15
- Poetic Prelude for Piano op.16 no.1
- Fantasy for Flute and Piano op.17 no.1
- Scherzo for Bassoon and Piano op.18
- Poetic Prelude for Piano op.19 no.2
- Suite Infantil for Piano op.20 no.2
- Prelude and Fuga for Piano op.21
- Fantasy for Violin and Piano op.22
- Fantasy for Piano op.23 no.2
- Sonata for Cello and Piano op.24
- Two part Invention for Piano op.25
- Music for Violin Viola and Piano op.26
- Fantasy for Piano op.27 no.3
- Fantasy for Piano op.28 no.4
- Music for Piano op.29
- Ballade for Piano op.30
- "I Love You" for Singer 2 Fl. and Piano op.31
- Suite for Flute and Piano op.32 no.2
- Fantasy for Flute and Piano op.33 no.2
- Theme and 7 variations for Piano op.34
- Sonata for Viola and Piano op.35
- Etude for Piano op.36 no.1
- Etude for Piano op.37 no.2
- Fantasy for Flute Clarinet Bass.and P.op.38
- Etude for Piano op.39 no.3
- Etude for Piano op.40 no.4
- Nocturne for Piano op.41 no.1
- Nocturne for Piano op.42 no.2
- Nocturne for Piano op.43 no.3
- Nocturne for Piano op.44 no.4
- Nocturne for Piano op.45 no.5
- "Rio" for Singer and Piano op.46
- Nocturne for Piano op.47 no.6
- Sonata for Bassoon and Piano op.48 no.1
- Fantasy for Oboe and Piano op.49
- Sonata for Violin and Piano op.50 no.3
- Sonata for Violin and Piano op.51 no.4
- Nocturne for Piano op.52 no.7 for Piano
- Fantasy for Trio and Piano Op.53
- Conc.for Piano and Orchestra op.54 no.1
- "Mar" for Singer and Piano op.55
- Poetic Prelude for Piano op.56 no.3
- Symphonic Overture for Orchestra op.57
- Symphonic Moment for Orchestra op.58
- "Feeling" for Piano op.59
- Serenade for Violin and Cordas op.60
- 3 Poemas for Piano op.61
- 4 Fant.em Jazz for Violin and Piano op.62
- 5 Fantasies em Jazz for Piano op.63
- "Walk in the Street" for Piano op.64
- "Landscape" for Piano op.65
- "The River" for Piano op.66
- "My Son Playing" for Piano op.67
- "The Cloud" for Piano op.68
- "The Stars" for Piano op.69
- "Mortality of the Insects" for P.op.70
- "Happy Hour" for Piano op.71
- "Sad Waltz" for Piano op.72
- Nocturne for Piano op.73 no.8
- "Mrs. Evie drink the tea" for Piano op.74
- "Mr.Alfred drink the coffee" for Piano op.75
- Nocturne for Piano op.76 no.9
- Serenade for Trump.Sax 2 Tromb.T.and P.op.77
- "The Toy" for Piano op.78
- "Planets" for Flute and Piano op.79
- 28 Romantic Themes for Piano op.80
- Nocturne for Piano op.81 no.10
- Nocturne for Piano op.82 no.11
- "...for the sick children" for Piano op.83
- Fantasy for Piano op.84 no.5
- Waltz for Piano for two hands Op.85
- Concerto for Piano and Orchestra op.86 no.2
- Suite for Piano op.87 no.3
- Scherzo for Piano op.88
- Toccata for Piano op.89
- Sonata for Piano op.90 no.2
- Nocturne for Piano op.91 no.12
- Christmas Rhapsody for piano op.92 no.1
- Christmas Rhapsody for piano op.93 no.2
- Etude for piano op.94 no.5
- Canzonetta for 4 Cellos op.95
- Rhapsody (R) for Piano op.96
- Rhapsody (PL) for Piano op.97
- Rhapsody (HB) for Piano op.98
- Hungarian Dance for 2 Pianos op.99
- Polonaise for Piano op.100
- Polonaise for Piano op.101
- Chopin Concerto op.102
- Fantasy in jazz No.1 for Trombone and Piano Op.103
- Fantasy in jazz No.2 for Trombone and Piano Op.104
- Fantasy in jazz No.3 for Trombone and Piano Op.105
- Fantasy in jazz No.4 for Trombone and Piano Op.106
- Etude for Guitar op.107
- Nocturne for Guitar op.108
- Theme for Sibelius op.109 no.1
- Ritwav for G., Bass, E.P.and Strings op.110 no.1
- Ritwav for Organ and Violin op.111 no.2
- Ritwav for Trumpet Piano Bass and Drums op.112 no.3
- Woman Dancing in the Desert for Orchestra op.113
- Movie Theme for Orchestra op.114 no.29
- God Save the Queen Rhapsody for Piano op.115
- One Kiss in Albeniz for Piano op.116
- One Kiss in Tchaikowsky for Piano op.117
- Movie Theme for Orchestra Op.118 no.01
- Minute Bach for Str, 2 P, Organ and Bass Guitar Op.119
- Movie Theme for Piano and Orchestra Op.120 no.02
- Movie Theme for Orchestra Op.121 no.03
- Movie Theme for Vibraphone and Orchestra Op.122 no.04
- Movie Theme for Wood. P. and Orchestra Op.123 no.05
- Movie Theme for Piano and Orchestra Op.124 no.06
- Movie Theme for Oboe P. Cel.and Orchestra Op.125 no.07
- Ritwav for Bass Trumpet Organ Guitar and Drums Op.126 no.4
- Ritwav for Guitar Bass and Drums Op.127 no.5
- Ritwav for Organ Bass and Drums Op.128 no.6
- Ritwav for 2 Organs Strings, Bass and Drums Op.129 no.7
- Movie Theme for Piano and Orchestra Op.130 no.08
- Ritwav for Trumpets Organ Guitar and Drums Op.131 no.8
- Ritwav for Organ, Bass Guitar and Drums Op.132 no.9
- Ritwav for 2 Trumpet Horn 2 Organs Bass Drums and Strings Op.133 no.10
- Ritwav for 2 Organs Bass and Drums Op.134 no.11
- Ritwav for 2 Organs Bass and Drums Op.135 no.12
- Movie Theme No.9 for Piano and Orchestra Op.136 no.09
- Movie Theme No.10 for Piano and Orchestra Op.137 no.10
- Song for Naira for Singer and Piano Op.138
- Song for Weber No.3 for Piano Op.139
- Sorcere's Apprendice (adaptation) Op.140
- Sonata for Violin and Piano Op.141
- Musica - I Feel Affliction for Violin and Piano Op.142
- Scherzo for Violin and Piano Op.143
- Theme for Sibelius Op.144 no.2
- Movie Theme No.11 for 2 Guitars and Orchestra Op.145
- Etude No.6 "Katrina" for Piano Op.146
- Movie Theme No.12 for Piano and Orchestra Op.147
- Movie Theme No.13 for Bass and Orchestra Op.148
- Movie Theme No.14 for Bass and Orchestra Op.149
- Movie Theme No.15 for Piano and Orchestra Op.150
- Movie Theme No.16 for Piano and Orchestra Op.151
- Movie Theme No.17 for Trumpet and Orchestra Op.152
- Movie Theme No.18 for Piano and Orchestra Op.153
- Movie Theme No.19 for Flute and Orchestra Op.154
- Movie Theme No.20 for Piano Orchestra Op.155
- Movie Theme No.21 for Harmonica Orchestra Op.156
- Movie Theme No.22 for Piano and Orchestra Op.157
- Canzonetta for Flute, Oboe and Cello Op.158
- Canzonetta for 4 Clarinets Op.159
- Fantasy for Clarinet and Piano Op.160 No.2
- Sonata No.1 for Flute and Piano Op.161
- Sonata No.1 for Clarinet (Bb) and Piano Op.162
- Canzonetta for Flute Oboe Clarinet (Bb) Bassoon and French Horn Op.163
- Canzonetta for String Quartet Op.164
- Symphonic Suite No.1 op.165
- Movie Theme No.23 for Piano and Orchestra Op.166
- Movie Theme No.24 for Piano and Orchestra Op.167
- Movie Theme No.25 for Piano and Orchestra Op.168
- Movie Theme No.26 for Flute and Orchestra Op.169
- Happy Moment in C for Vibraphone and Strings Op.170
- Movie theme No.27 for Piano Op.171
- Movie Theme No.28 for Piano and Orchestra Op.172
- Movie Theme No.30 for Vibraphone and Orchestra Op.173
- Movie Theme No.31 for Piano and Orchestra Op.174
- Movie Theme No.32 for Orchestra Op.175
- Movie Theme No.33 for Piano and Orchestra Op.176
- Movie Theme No.34 for Trumpet, Piano and Orchestra Op.177
- Song for Weber No.1 for Piano Op.178
- Movie Theme No.39 for Orchestra Op.179
- Piano Concerto Op.180 No.3 Op.180
- Movie Theme No.35 for Piano Op.181
- Movie Theme No.36 for Piano and Orchestra Op.182
- Movie Theme No.37 for Piano and Orchestra Op.183
- Movie Theme No.38 for Flute and Orchestra Op.184
- Sonata for Clarinet (Bb) and Piano Op.185 No.2
- Sonata for Cello and Piano Op.186 No.2
- Sonata for Viola and Piano Op.187 No.2
- Fantasy for Bassoon and Piano Op.189
- Scherzo for Oboe and Piano Op.190
- Sonata No.1 for Oboe and Piano Op.191
- Fantasy No.2 for Trio (Strings) and Piano Op.192
- Sonata No.3 for Cello and Piano Op.193
- Serenade Classica for Brass Quartet and Strings Op.194
- Musica for Violin Cello and Piano Op.195
- Serenade Classica for Woodinds and Strings Op.196
- Musica for Flute and Clarinet Op.197
- Sonata Basson Op.198 no.02
- Fantasy for Brass and Piano Op.199
- Song for Weber No.2 for Piano Op.200
- Come Back to Me for Voice Piano and orchestra Op.201
- Musica for String Quartet Op.202
- Sonata for Bassoon and Piano Op.203 no.2
- Musica for Trombone and Piano Op.204
- Musica for Contrabass and Piano Op.205
- Sonata for Cello and Piano Op.206 no.4
- Musica for Flute Clarinet and Piano Op.207
- Serenade for Clarinet and Strings Op.208
- Piano Concerto Op.209 No.4
- Waltz for Piano Op.210 no.2
- Nocturne for Piano Op.211 No.13
- Nocturne Op.212 No.14
- Young Composers Theme Op.213
- Nocturne Op.214 No.15
- Concerto Op.215 No.5
- Nocturne Op.216 No.16
- Canzonetta for Wind Quartet Op.217
- Canzonetta for String orchestra Op.218
