= Penthouse Party =

- Genre: Variety
- Created by: Lester Lewis
- Presented by: Betty Furness (host); Anita Ellis; Don Cherry; Buddy Weed Trio
- Country of origin: United States
- Original language: English
- No. of seasons: 1
- No. of episodes: 39

Production
- Running time: 30 minutes

Original release
- Network: ABC Television
- Release: September 15, 1950 – June 8, 1951

Penthouse Party is an American television variety series that aired on ABC from September 15, 1950, until June 8, 1951.

== Format ==
Penthouse Party was hosted by Betty Furness and was set in her penthouse. Pianist Buddy Weed and singer Don Cherry were regulas on the program. Each episode began with Furness inviting viewers to "Come on inside and meet all the folks." Most celebrity guests were active in music or theater in New York, and they often demonstrated talents not associated with their public images.

Guests who appeared on the program included Joan Blondell.

== Production ==
The 30-minute show was produced by Lester Lewis, and ran for 39 episodes. From September to December 1950, the show aired Fridays from 10 to 10:30 p.m. Eastern Time. From January 5, 1951, to June 1951, the show aired Fridays from 8:30 to 9 p.m. E T. Sponsors included Best Foods.

The show was replaced by The Jerry Colonna Show.

== Critical response ==
A review in the trade publication Variety described the premiere episode as "marked by an easy, informal atmosphere" It commended Furness's "effortless intros and general poise".

== See also ==
- 1950-51 United States network television schedule
