= Daniele Sepe =

Italian musician

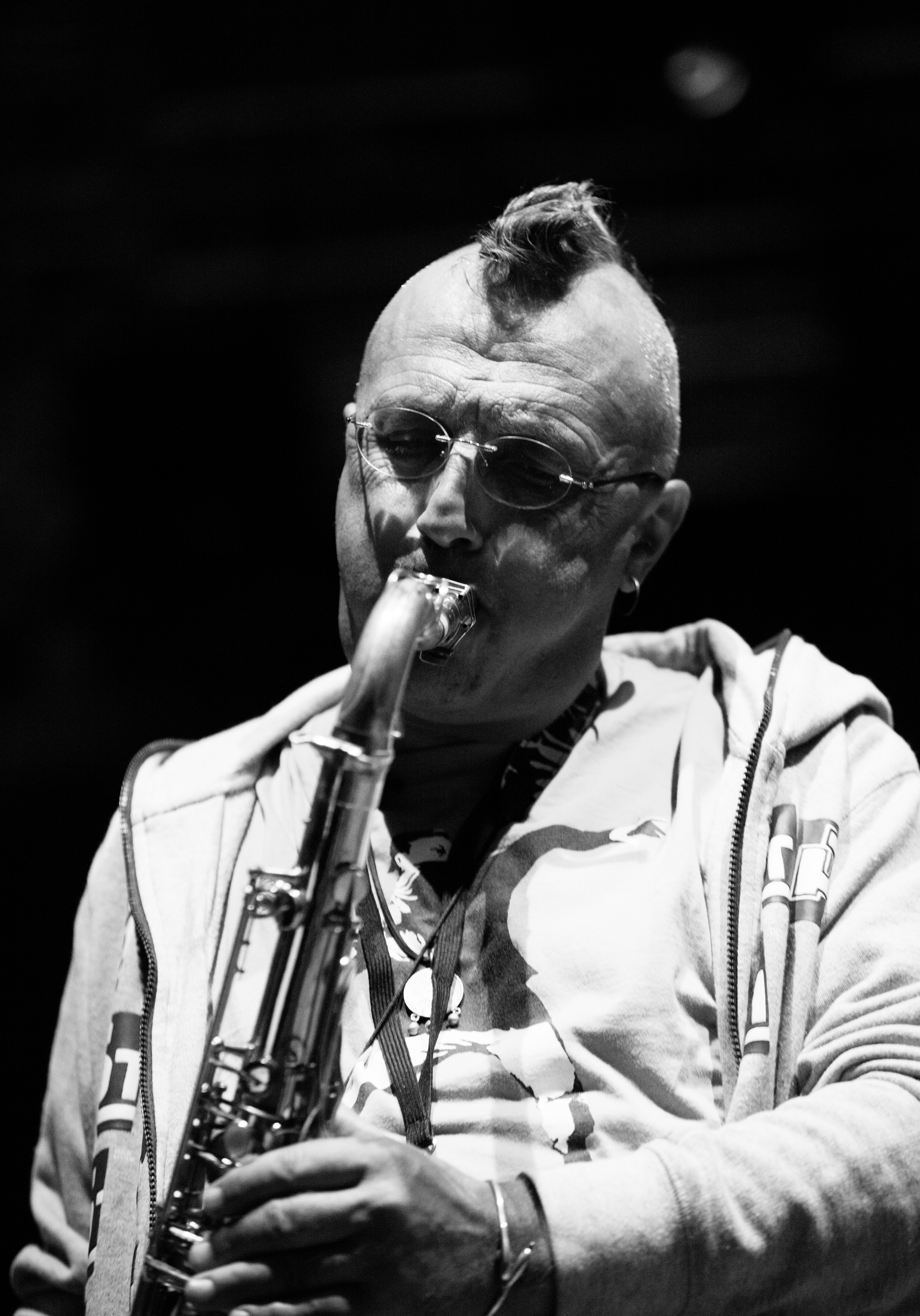
Daniele Sepe at the TFF Rudolstadt 2013

Daniele Sepe (born 17 April 1960 in Naples) is an Italian musician, known internationally for interpreting protest songs from around the world.

His first instrument was the flute, which he played at the San Pietro a Majella conservatoire. After graduating, he began performing with the Gruppo operaio 'E Zezi di Pomigliano d'Arco, playing at numerous festivals and recording a few albums.

Sepe soon, however, became more interested in jazz and learned to play the saxophone. He continued recording and began performing with many prominent musicians, like Nino D'Angelo, Gino Paoli, Eduardo de Crescenzo, Mia Martini, Teresa de Sio, Roberto de Simone, Peppino Gagliardi, Nino Bonocore and Roberto Murolo. His band, which played under several names, varied widely, from purely wind instruments to big bands. He also composed music for the theatre, cinema and ballet.

In 1994, Sepe recorded Vite Perdite, which was much more successful than any of his previous niche recordings. It was dubbed album of year by Rockerilla, one of the one hundred greatest albums of the 1990s by Rockstar, and received a rave review from Folk-Roots, an English magazine.

== Discography ==
Year	Title	Label
1989	Malamusica	Polo sud
1992	L'uscita dei gladiatori	Stile Libero/Virgin
1993	Play Standard and More	Officina
1994	Vite perdite	Polo Sud-Piranha
1995	Spiritus Mundi	Polo sud
1996	Viaggi fuori dai paraggi (compilation)	Il Manifesto
1996	Trasmigrazioni	Il Manifesto
1997	Vite Perdite	Pirhana
1997	L'uscita dei gladiatori - rivisto e corretto	Il Manifesto
1998	Lavore stanca	CNI
1999	Toto sketches	Polo Sud
2000	Conosci Víctor Jara?	Il Manifesto
2000	Viaggi Fuori Dai Paraggi	Robi Droli/Newtone
2004	Truffe & Other Sturiellett' Vol. 1	Polo Sud
2002	Senza Filtro	Dunya
2003	Anime Candide	Dunya
2004	Truffe & other sturiellett' Vol 2	Polo Sud
2004	Nia Maro	Il Manifesto
2005	Lesamore (con A.Kokko)	Materiali Sonori
2005	Una Bandi di Pezzenti	RaiTrade
2006	Suonarne 1 per educarne 100	
2007	Kronomakia	
2008	Nostra patria è il mondo intero con la Brigada Internazionale	
2010	Fessbuk	
