= Craig Bailey =

Scottish footballer

Personal information
- Full name: William Craig Bailey
- Date of birth: 6 July 1944 (age 82)
- Place of birth: Airdrie, Scotland
- Position: Forward

Senior career*
Years	Team	Apps	(Gls)
19??–1961	Kirkintilloch Rob Roy		
1961–1963	Brighton & Hove Albion	4	(1)
1963–1964	Cambridge United		
1964–1965	Motherwell	6	(3)
1965	Distillery		
1965–1966	Brechin City	2	(0)
1966–19??	Distillery		
- * Club domestic league appearances and goals

William Craig Bailey (born 6 July 1944), sometimes erroneously written Baillie, is a Scottish former professional footballer who played as a forward in the English Football League for Brighton & Hove Albion, in the Scottish League for Motherwell and Brechin City, in the Irish League for Distillery and in the English Southern League for Cambridge United.
