= Erik Lindström =

Swedish ski jumper

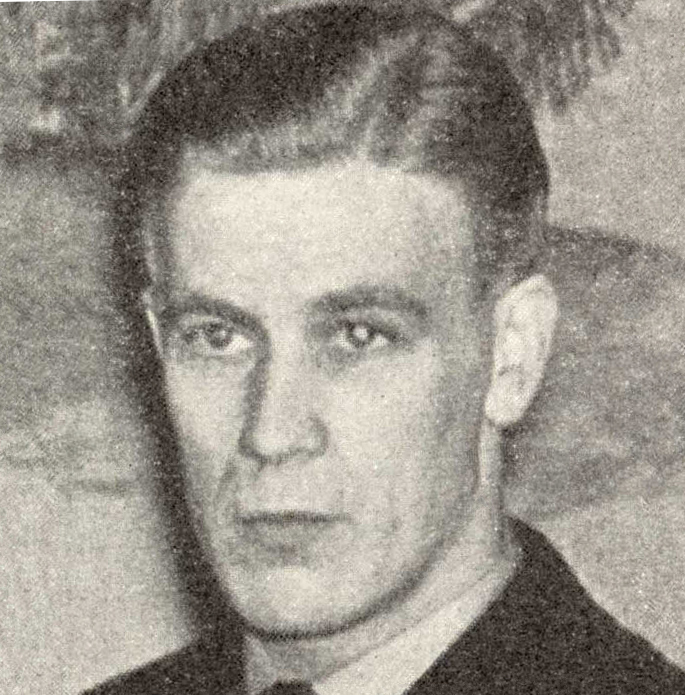

Personal information
- Born: 2 January 1918 Örnsköldsvik, Sweden
- Died: 2 September 1955 (aged 37) Örnsköldsvik, Sweden

Sport
- Sport: Ski jumping
- Club: IF Friska Viljor, Örnsköldsvik

Erik Valter Lindström (2 January 1918 – 2 September 1955) was a Swedish ski jumper. He competed in the normal hill event at the 1948 Winter Olympics and served as the Swedish flag bearer at those games.
