= Eldad Tarmu =

American jazz musician

Eldad Tarmu is an American vibraphonist, composer, and music educator. Between 2005 and 2009 he was a professor of Jazz Studies at the Richard Oschanitzky Jazz and Pop School of Tibiscus University in Timișoara, Romania, where he led the Jazz Department. In 2006, he established a partnership with the American Cultural Center in Bucharest, aiming to strengthen cultural ties between Romania and the US and promote jazz as an American art form. He resides in the New York area, where he performs regularly on the jazz and contemporary classical scene.

== Early life ==
Eldad Tarmu was born in Los Angeles, California, shortly after his parents, Yehuda Tarmu and Galya Pillin-Tarmu, graphic artists initially based in Israel, moved to the US. Yehuda Tarmu was a painter and documentary film director of Polish-Jewish origin, while Chicago-born Galya, sister of poet William Pillin, was a painter of Ukrainian-Jewish descent.

== Career ==
After a few years of touring with local bands as a rock drummer, he pursued undergraduate studies at Tel Aviv University in Israel. Upon returning to the US, he started working on his first original jazz records and doing international tours. In 2002, he enrolled in graduate studies, and in 2005 he received a master’s degree in Afro-Latin Music from California State University Los Angeles. Tarmu also holds a Master of Arts in Classical Composition and a doctorate in Jazz Performance from Stony Brook University in New York.

Tarmu has worked with Ron Affif, Ray Anderson, Mike Clark, Billy Higgins, Freddie Hubbard, Taj Mahal, Frank Morgan, Poncho Sanchez, Cybill Shepherd, and Ernie Watts. He has performed in over twenty-five countries in various festivals and concert tours.

His album Get Up Close was number 20 on the U.S. Jazz radio charts for four weeks. His first chamber music album, Songs for the Queen of Bohemia, released in 2007, while jazz-oriented, features a string quartet from the Timișoara Philharmonic, Romanian bassist Johnny Bota, and British-Israeli drummer Yoni Halevy. The eclectic project crosses jazz and Middle Eastern with chamber ensemble arrangements

In 2017 he released a second chamber music record, under 4-Tay Records, in the contemporary classical genre, called Stained Glass Stories. A new album of jazz originals, called Tarmu Jazz Quartet, was released in March 2023. His most recent project, titled Silver on Aluminum is a tribute to Horace Silver, recorded in a trio formula and released in January 2025.

== Discography ==
- Aluminum Forest (Chartmaker Records, 1998)
- Get Up Close (Rhombus Records, 2001)
- Visits (Fever Pitch, 2003)
- Exotic Tales (Verytall Records, 2005)
- Songs for the Queen of Bohemia (Queen of Bohemia Productions, 2009)
- Farewell, St. George (Queen of Bohemia Productions, 2008)
- Stained Glass Stories (Queen of Bohemia Productions, 2017)
- Tarmu Jazz Quartet (Queen of Bohemia Productions, 2023)
