= Marla Glen =

American singer (born 1960)

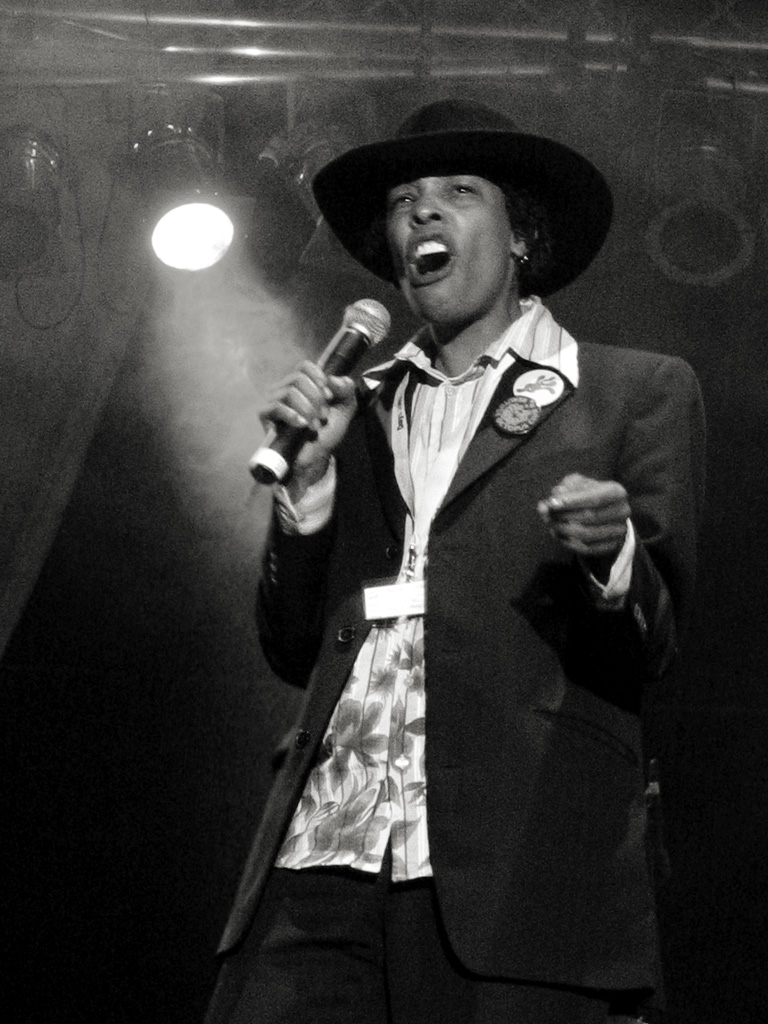
Marla Glen in concert in Germany, 2003.

Marla Glen (born January 3, 1960) is an American singer from Chicago who has been based in Germany since 1998.

== Career ==
Marla Glen was born to Mexican-American and Jamaican-American parents and grew up on the South Side of Chicago. Glen received a toy harmonica from Muddy Waters when he was five, which started his fascination with music. When he was 11 years old, he wrote his first song, "Repertoire", which later appeared on his album Love and Respect.

Glen won first prize performing at a local open mic contest in New Orleans and was rewarded with a trip to France, where he first performed in front of a European audience and after a few years signed with Vogue Records. He formed the Marla Glen Band in Niort, France. He was once a bodyguard for Nina Simone, and was mentored by and lived with both Simone and Bo Diddley during his early career.

He released his debut album entitled This Is Marla Glen in 1993 followed by Love and Respect in 1995. These albums have received platinum and gold awards.

He released the book The Cost of Freedom, a memoir co-authored with Stacey McClain in 2023.

== Personal life ==
Glen moved to Germany in 1998. On July 2, 2004, he entered into a civil union with Sabrina Conley, but they later got divorced. Glen came out as a trans man in 2023 and kept the same name.

== Discography ==
- 1993: This is Marla Glen (Disques Vogue)
- 1995: Love and Respect (Disques Vogue)
- 1997: Our World (Ariola)
- 1998: The Best of Marla Glen
- 2003: Friends
- 2005: Greatest Hits Live
- 2006: Dangerous
- 2011: Humanology
- 2020: Unexpected
