= The Cool School (album) =

Studio album by June Christy
- Released: 1960
- Recorded: Hollywood, California, September 1959
- Genre: Vocal jazz, Children's music
- Label: Capitol
- Producer: Bill Miller

June Christy chronology
Road Show (1959)	The Cool School (1960)	Off-Beat (1960)

Professional ratings
Review scores
Source	Rating
Allmusic	4/5 stars

The Cool School is a 1960 album by June Christy of songs sung by children the world over accompanied by the Joe Castro Quartet. June’s daughter Shay (then aged 5) was pictured on the LP/CD cover wearing a blue smock.

The album was re-issued in 2006 as a double-CD together with Do-Re-Mi.

== Track listing ==
1. “Give a Little Whistle” (Leigh Harline, Ned Washington)
2. “Magic Window” (Jimmy Van Heusen, Johnny Burke)
3. “Baby’s Birthday Party” (Ann Ronell)
4. “When You Wish upon a Star” (Leigh Harline, Ned Washington)
5. “Baubles, Bangles, & Beads” (Robert Wright, Chet Forrest)
6. “Aren't You Glad You're You?” (Jimmy Van Heusen, Johnny Burke)
7. “Kee-mo, ky-mo” (Bob Hilliard, Roy Alfred)
8. “Scarlet Ribbons (For Her Hair)” (Evelyn Danzig, Jack Segal)
9. “Looking for a Boy” (George Gershwin, Ira Gershwin)
10. “Small Fry” (Hoagy Carmichael, Frank Loesser)
11. “Ding-Dong! The Witch Is Dead” (Harold Arlen, Yip Harburg)
12. “Swinging on a Star” (Jimmy Van Heusen, Johnny Burke)

== Personnel ==
- June Christy - vocals

The Joe Castro Quartet

- Joe Castro - piano
- Howard Roberts - guitar
- Leroy Vinnegar - bass
- Larry Bunker - drums
