= June Christy =

American singer (1925–1990)

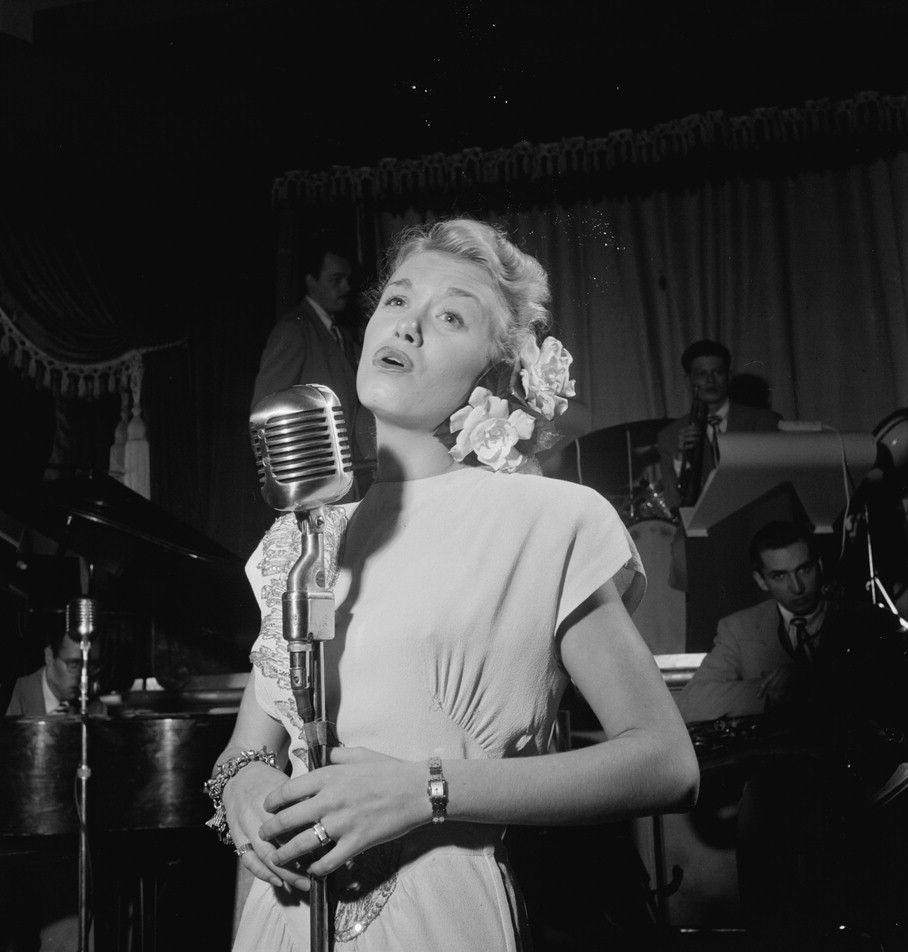
- Christy at the Club Troubador, New York, c. 1947

Background information
- Also known as: Sharon Leslie
- Born: Shirley Luster; November 20, 1925; Springfield, Illinois, U.S.
- Died: June 21, 1990 (aged 64) Sherman Oaks, California, U.S.
- Genres: Pop, jazz, cool jazz
- Occupation: Singer
- Years active: 1938–1988
- Label: Capitol

June Christy (born Shirley Luster; November 20, 1925 – June 21, 1990) was an American singer, known for her work in the cool jazz genre and for her silky smooth vocals. Her success as a singer began with The Stan Kenton Orchestra. She pursued a solo career from 1954 and is best known for her debut album Something Cool. After her death, she was hailed as "one of the finest and most neglected singers of her time."

== Biography ==
=== Early life ===
Shirley Luster was born in Springfield, Illinois, United States. She moved with her parents Steve and Marie (née Crain) Luster to Decatur, Illinois, when she was three years old. She began to sing with the Decatur-based Bill Oetzel Orchestra at thirteen. While attending Decatur High School she appeared with Oetzel and his society band, the Ben Bradley Band, and Bill Madden's Band.

Her first work outside of Decatur was with the Dick Cisne Orchestra of nearby Champaign, Illinois, performing as far away as Texas and Louisiana. After high school she moved to Chicago, changed her name to Sharon Leslie, and sang with a group led by Boyd Raeburn. Later she joined Benny Strong's band. In 1944, Strong's band moved to New York City at the same time Christy was quarantined in Chicago with scarlet fever.

=== Work with Stan Kenton's Orchestra ===
In 1945, after hearing that Anita O'Day had left Stan Kenton's Orchestra, she auditioned and was chosen for the role as a vocalist. During this time, she changed her name once again, becoming June Christy.

Her voice produced hits such as "Shoo Fly Pie and Apple Pan Dowdy", the million-selling "Tampico" in 1945, and "How High the Moon". "Tampico" was Kenton's biggest-selling record. When the Kenton orchestra temporarily disbanded in 1948, she sang in nightclubs for a short time, and reunited with the band two years later. Christy appeared as guest vocalist on the Kenton albums: Artistry in Rhythm (Capitol BD-39, 1946 [1947]), A Presentation of Progressive Jazz (Capitol CD-79, 1947 [1948]), Encores (Capitol CC-113, 1945–47 [1949]), Innovations in Modern Music (Capitol P-189, 1950), Stan Kenton Presents (Capitol L/P-248, 1950), Stan Kenton Classics (Capitol H/T-358, 1944–47 [1952]), and The Kenton Era (Capitol WDX-569, 1940–54, [1955]).

Beginning on September 28, 1959, Christy began a five-week road tour of 38 performances called Road Show. The all-star billing: Stan Kenton and his Orchestra, June Christy, and The Four Freshmen. Capitol recorded highlights on October 10 at Purdue University in Lafayette, Indiana, for a two-disc LP, reissued on CD in 1988.

=== Solo career ===
From 1947, she started to work on her own records, primarily with arranger and bandleader Pete Rugolo. In 1954, she released a 10-inch LP entitled Something Cool, recorded with Rugolo and his orchestra, a gathering of notable Los Angeles jazz musicians that included alto saxophonist Bud Shank and Christy's husband, multi-instrumentalist Bob Cooper. Something Cool was re-released as a 12-inch LP in 1955 with additional selections, and then entirely rerecorded in stereo in 1960 with somewhat different personnel. Christy would later say the album was "the only thing I've recorded that I'm not unhappy with". Something Cool was also important in launching the vocal cool movement of the 1950s, and it hit the Top 20 Charts, as did her third album, The Misty Miss Christy (1956).

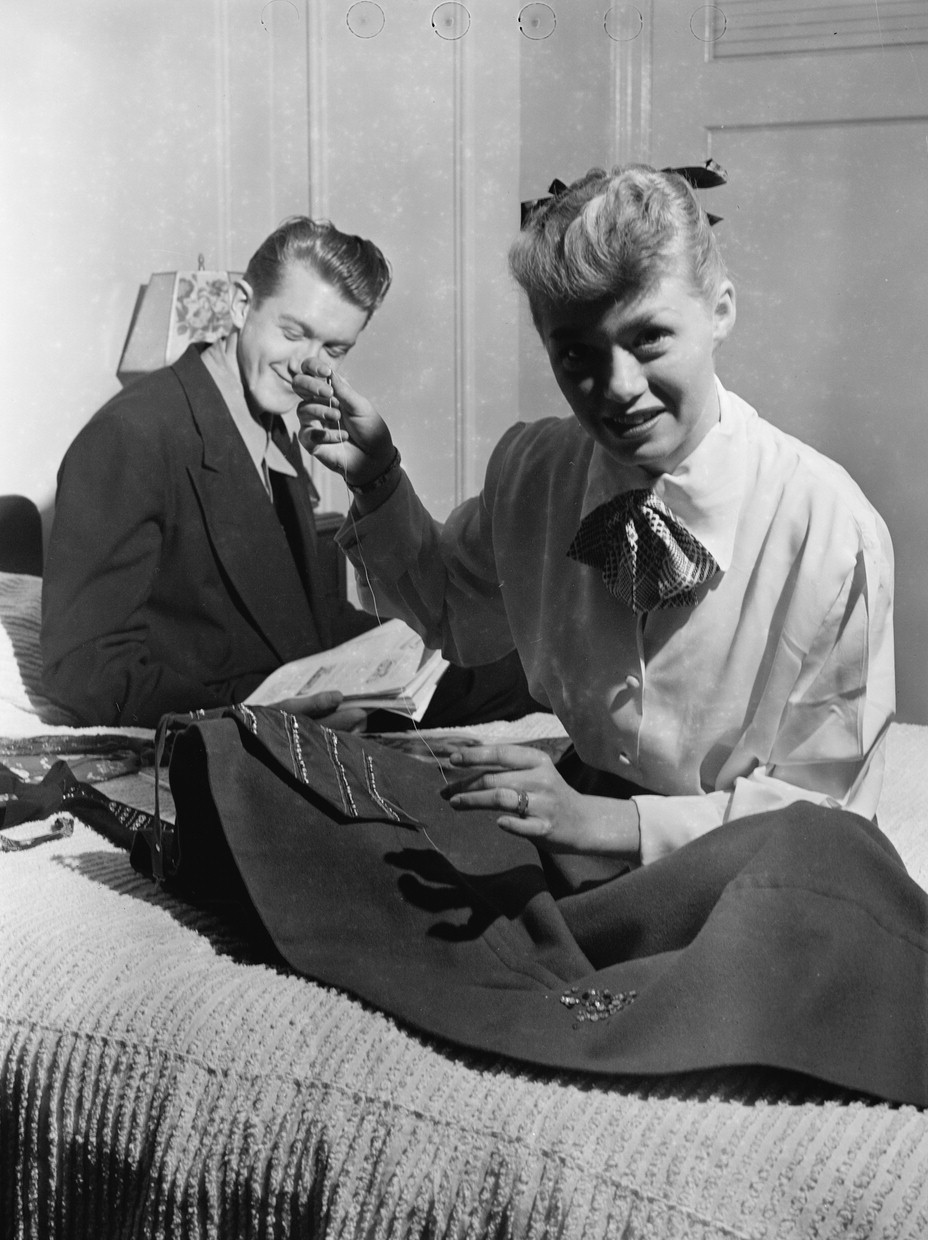
Bob Cooper and Christy c. 1947

In the 1950s and 1960s, Christy appeared on a number of television programs, including the short-lived CBS show Adventures in Jazz (1949), Eddie Condon's Floor Show (1949), The Jackie Gleason Show (1953), The Tonight Show (1955), The Nat King Cole Show (1957), Stars of Jazz (1958), The Steve Allen Show (1959), The Lively Ones (1963), Not Only But Also (UK 1965), and The Joey Bishop Show (1967). She also appeared on the first sponsored jazz concert on television, The Timex All-Star Jazz Show I (December 30, 1957), which also featured Louis Armstrong, Carmen McRae, Duke Ellington, and Gene Krupa.

Christy played in Europe, South Africa, Australia, and Japan, but the extensive touring eventually began taking a toll on her marriage, and she pulled back from touring by the 1960s.

Richard Cook and Brian Morton, writers of The Penguin Guide to Jazz Recordings, appreciated the singer's body of work: "Christy's wholesome but particularly sensuous voice is less an improviser's vehicle than an instrument for long, controlled lines and the shading of a fine vibrato. Her greatest moments – the heartbreaking 'Something Cool' itself, 'Midnight Sun', 'I Should Care' – are as close to creating definitive interpretations as any singer can come."

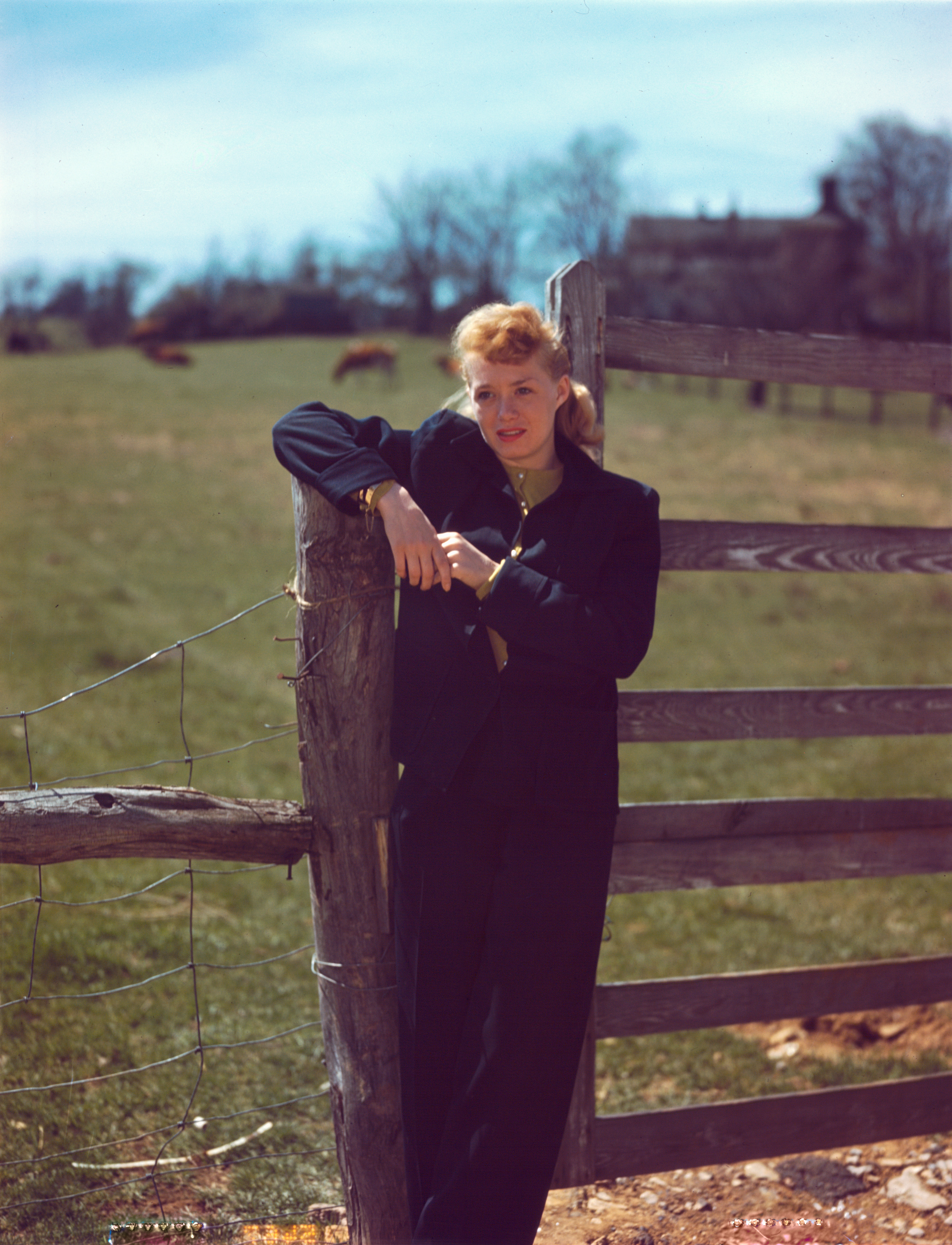
Christy c. 1947

=== Personal life ===
Christy was married to Bob Cooper in 1947. In 1954, she gave birth to a daughter, Shay Christy Cooper (September 1, 1954 – February 21, 2014). She also had an older brother, Jack A. Luster (1920 – 2013).

=== Later years and death ===
Christy semi-retired from the music business in 1969, in part because of alcoholism.

In 1972, she sang at the Newport Jazz Festival in New York City, where she was reunited with the Kenton Orchestra. She also performed at a handful of jazz festivals during the late 1970s and 1980s, playing with a band of all-star West Coast jazz musicians led by Shorty Rogers, as well as taking part in a number of world tours.

Christy returned to the recording studio in 1977 to record her final solo LP, Impromptu. She recorded an interview in 1987 for a Paul Cacia produced album called The Alumni Tribute to Stan Kenton on the Happy Hour label. A number of other Kenton alumni (Shorty Rogers, Lee Konitz, Jack Sheldon, among them) interspersed their tunes with reminiscences of the man and the years on the road.

Christy toured one final time in 1985, again with Shorty Rogers. In her final performance, she shared the bill with Chet Baker.

Christy died at her home in Sherman Oaks, California, of kidney failure on June 21, 1990, at the age of 64.

== Discography ==
=== Albums ===
Year	Album	Label
1953	Get Happy (vinyl)	Capitol Records
1954	Something Cool	Capitol Records
1955	Duet	Capitol Records
1955	Something Cool (4 additional songs; reissue)	Capitol Records
1956	The Misty Miss Christy	Capitol Records
1957	Fair and Warmer!	Capitol Records
1957	Gone for the Day	Capitol Records
1958	This Is June Christy! (compilation album)	Capitol Records
1958	June's Got Rhythm	Capitol Records
1958	The Song Is June!	Capitol Records
1959	June Christy Recalls Those Kenton Days	Capitol Records
1959	Ballads for Night People	Capitol Records
1959	Road Show	Capitol Records
1960	The Cool School	Capitol Records
1960	Something Cool (stereo version)	Capitol Records
1960	Off-Beat	Capitol Records
1961	Do-Re-Mi (A Modern Interpretation of the Hit Broadway Musical)	Capitol Records
1961	This Time of Year	Capitol Records
1962	The Best of June Christy (compilation album)	Capitol Records
1962	Big Band Specials	Capitol Records
1963	The Intimate Miss Christy	Capitol Records
1963	The Swinging Chicks	Camay Records
1965	Something Broadway, Something Latin	Capitol Records
1977	Impromptu	Interplay Records, Discovery Records (reissue)
1986	A Lovely Way to Spend an Evening	Jasmine Records
1986	The Uncollected June Christy with The Kentones	Hindsight Records
1987	The Uncollected June Christy, Vol. II	Hindsight Records

=== Compilation CDs ===
Release date	Album	Label
1994	June Christy and the Stan Kenton Orchestra	Collectors' Choice Music
1995	Day Dreams (1947–1955)	Capitol Records
1995	Through the Years (1946/1957/1965)	Hindsight Records
1995	Spotlight On...June Christy	Capitol Records
1997	The Best of June Christy: The Jazz Sessions	Capitol Records
1998	A Friendly Session, Vol. 1	Jasmine Records
1999	A Friendly Session, Vol. 2	Jasmine Records
1999	Live at the Newport Jazz Festival, July 1972	Jazz Band
2000	The Ballad Collection	Capitol Records
2000	A Friendly Session, Vol. 3	Jasmine Records
2002	Cool Christy (1945–1951)	Proper Records
2012	101 Essential June Christy: Something Cool	AP Music Ltd.
2019	The June Christy/Stan Kenton Collection 1945–1955	Acrobat

== Television appearances ==
Date	Series	Songs
1949	Adventures in Jazz	Unknown
1949	Art Ford Show	Unknown
1949	Eddie Condon's Floor Show	Unknown
1950	The Alan Young Show	Unknown
1950	Jack Carter Show	Unknown
September 29, 1950	Penthouse Party	Unknown
December 1, 1951	Penthouse Party	Unknown
July 3, 1953	The Jackie Gleason Show	Unknown
1955	The Tonight Show with Steve Allen	Unknown
March 9, 1956	Stars of Jazz	Unknown
September 7, 1957	Nat King Cole Show	I Want to Be Happy; How High the Moon
December 30, 1957	Timex All Star Jazz	I Want to be Happy
March 3, 1958	Stars of Jazz	Get Happy; That's All
February 6, 1958	Stars of Jazz	I Want to Be Happy; That's All
January 10, 1959	Playboy's Penthouse	How High the Moon; I Want to Be Happy; Something Cool
November 23, 1959	The Steve Allen Plymouth Show	Midnight Sun; Medley with Steve and Mel
October 9, 1962	The Steve Allen Playhouse	Midnight Sun; Willow Weep for Me
November 2, 1963	One O'Clock Show	Unknown
August 8, 1963	The Lively Ones	I'll Take Romance; Midnight Sun
October 1, 1964	On Stage	Unknown
February 24, 1965	The Mike Douglas Show	Unknown
February 6, 1965	Not Only But Also	You Came a Long Way From St. Louis; Just in Time; Remind Me; My Shining Hour
December 8, 1965	Mike Douglas Show	Unknown
August 11, 1967	The Joey Bishop Show	Unknown
February 20, 1968	Woody Woodbury Show	A Lovely Way to Spend an Evening; My Shining Hour; Midnight Sun (with Stan Kenton)
June 30, 1972	The Dick Cavett Show	A Lovely Way to Spend an Evening; Remind Me; My Shining Hour
1972	Words & Music by Bobby Troup (with Stan Kenton)	The Meaning of the Blues; Hey Daddy; Lonely Girl
February 6, 1975	New Morning	Unknown
