= Bob Cooper (musician) =

American jazz saxophonist and oboist (1925–1993)

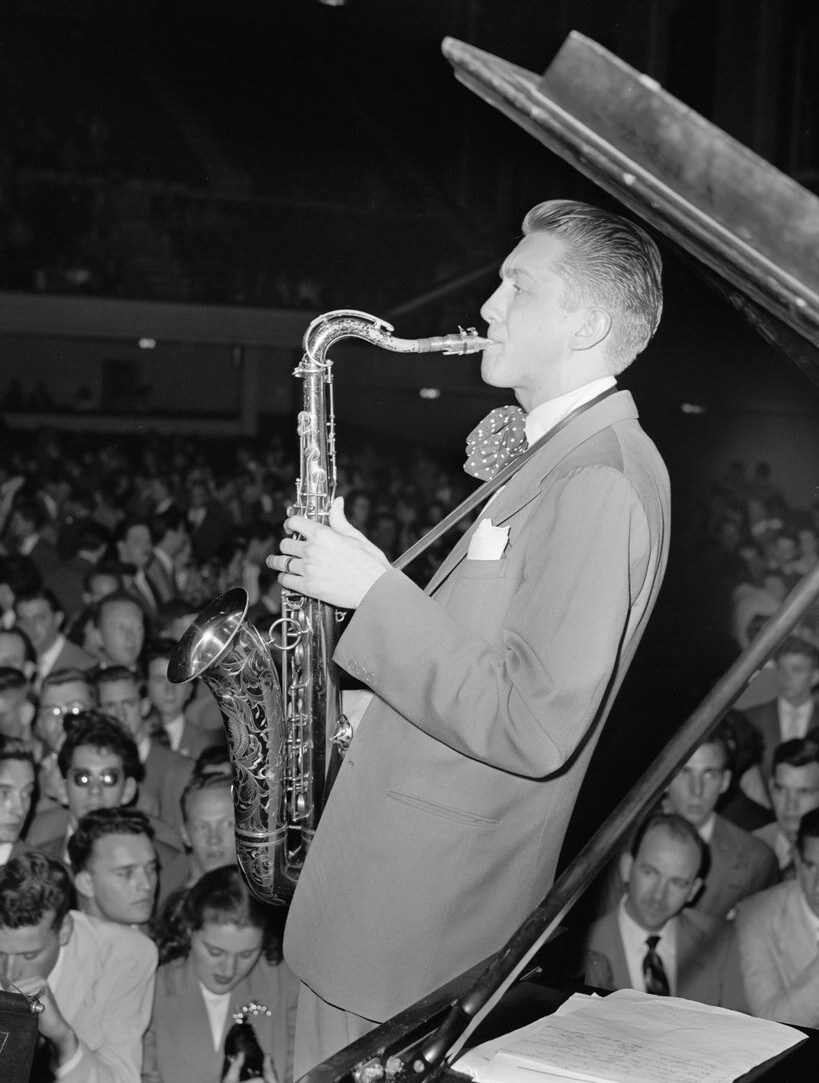
- Cooper, c. 1947; by William P. Gottlieb

Background information
- Born: December 6, 1925; Pittsburgh, Pennsylvania, U.S.
- Died: August 5, 1993 (aged 67) Los Angeles, California, U.S.
- Genres: Jazz; West Coast jazz
- Occupation: Musician
- Instruments: Saxophone; oboe; English horn
- Years active: 1940s–1993
- Labels: Capitol; Pacific Jazz; Music; Contemporary; World Pacific; Trend; Discovery; Woofy Productions
- Formerly of: Stan Kenton Herd
- Spouse: June Christy (m. 1947–1990)

Bob Cooper (December 6, 1925 – August 5, 1993) was a West Coast jazz musician known primarily for playing tenor saxophone, but also for being one of the first to play jazz solos on the oboe.

== Career ==
Cooper worked in Stan Kenton's band starting in 1945 and married the band's singer, June Christy, two years later. Their union produced a daughter, Shay Christy Cooper (September 1, 1954 – February 21, 2014), with the marriage lasting 44 years until Christy's death in 1990. He later left the Kenton band in 1951 and joined Howard Rumsey's Lighthouse All-Stars with his friend and bandmate Bud Shank. The two would go on to form a wind partnership, with Cooper on oboe and Shank on flute, that was a novel frontline combination for jazz.

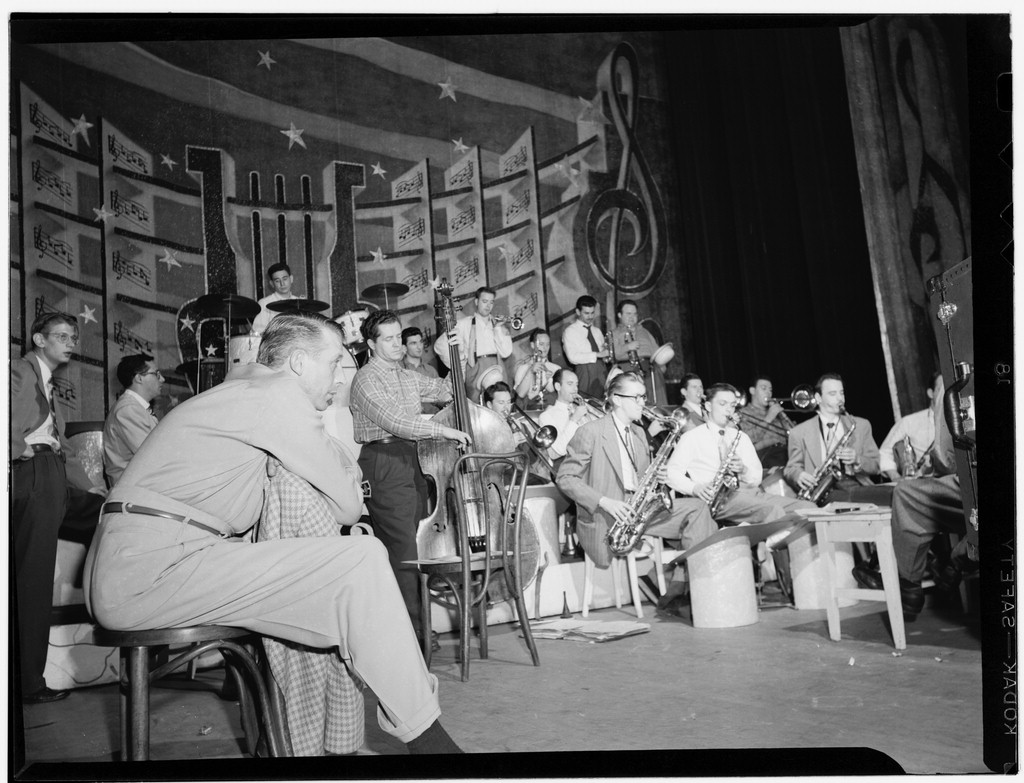
Cooper (furthest left on saxophone) with the Stan Kenton band, Richmond, Virginia, c. 1947; by William P. Gottlieb

He worked in Pete Rugolo's orchestra from the mid-1950s through 1960s as well as in the later bands of Stan Kenton. From the 1960s, he became mainly a sideman and studio musician, often arranging music for his wife, June Christy.

His last studio recording was on Karrin Allyson's album Sweet Home Cookin' (1994), on which he played tenor saxophone.

Cooper died of a heart attack in Los Angeles, California, at the age of 67. He was found in his car, which had pulled over to the side of the road.

== Selected discography ==
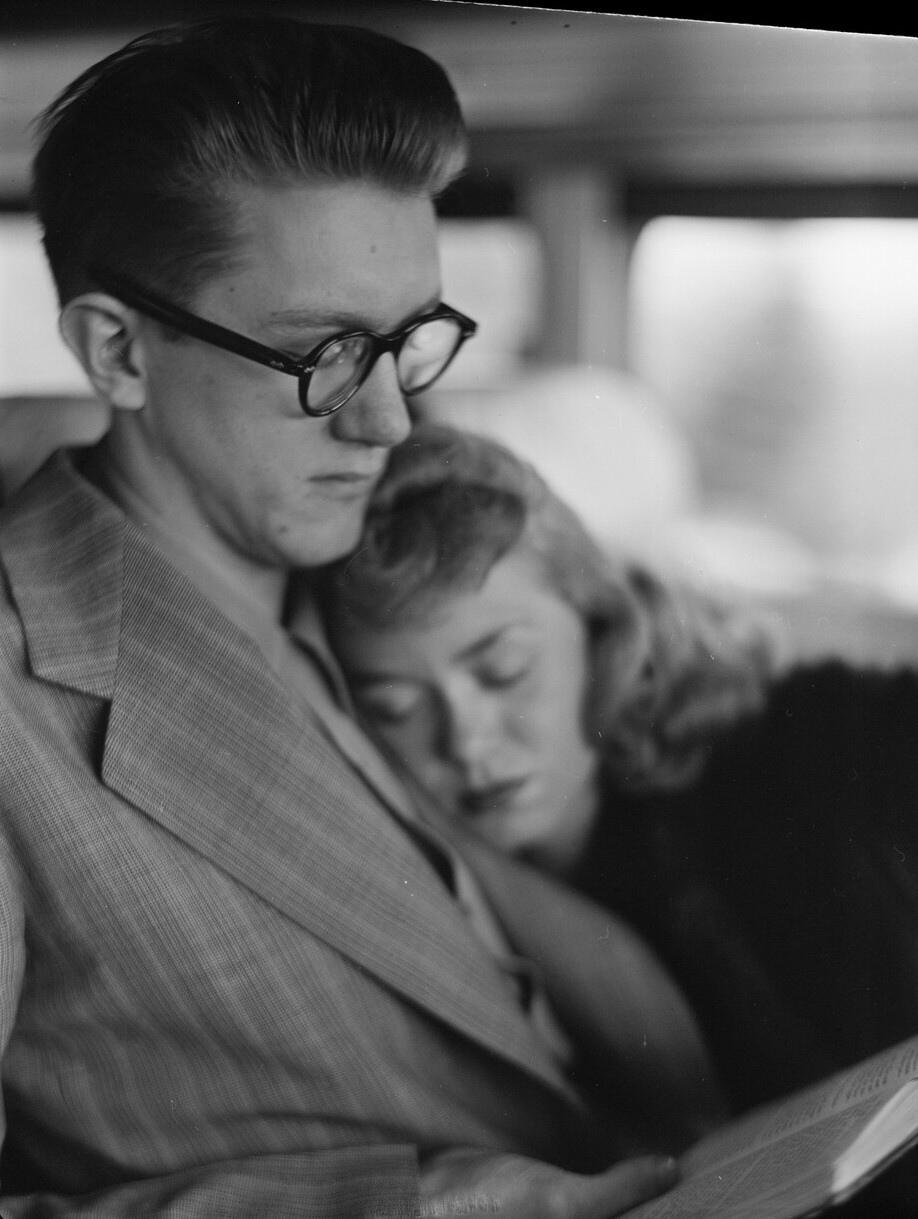
Cooper and June Christy, c. 1947; by William P. Gottlieb

=== As leader ===
- The Bob Cooper Sextet (Capitol, 1954)
- Shifting Winds (Capitol, 1955)
- Flute 'n Oboe (Pacific Jazz, 1957) – with Bud Shank
- Milano Blues (Music, 1957)
- Coop! The Music of Bob Cooper (Contemporary, 1958)
- The Swing's to TV (World Pacific, 1958) – with Bud Shank
- Blowin' Country (World Pacific, 1959) – with Bud Shank
- Tenor Sax Jazz Impressions (Trend, 1979)
- The Music of Michel Legrand (Discovery, 1980) – with Mike Wofford, Tom Azarello, and Jim Plank
- In a Mellotone (Contemporary, 1985) – with the Snooky Young Sextet featuring Ernie Andrews
- At the Royal Palms Inn (Woofy Productions, 1993) – with Carl Fontana
- For All We Know (Fresh Sounds, 2000) -with Lou Levy

=== As sideman ===
With Karrin Allyson

- Sweet Home Cookin' (Concord Jazz, 1994)

With Chet Baker

- Witch Doctor (Contemporary, 1953 [1985])

With Elmer Bernstein

- The Man with the Golden Arm (Decca, 1956)

With Buddy Bregman

- Swinging Kicks (Verve, 1957)

With June Christy

- June's Got Rhythm (Capitol, 1958)
- Do-Re-Mi (Capitol, 1961)
- Impromptu (Interplay, 1977)

With Maynard Ferguson

- Maynard Ferguson's Hollywood Party (EmArcy, 1954)
- Jam Session featuring Maynard Ferguson (EmArcy, 1954)
- Dimensions (EmArcy, 1955)

With Jimmy Giuffre

- The Jimmy Giuffre Clarinet (Atlantic, 1956)

With The Gene Harris All Star Big Band

- Tribute to Count Basie (Concord Jazz, 1988)

With Stan Kenton

- Stan Kenton's Milestones (Capitol, 1943–47 [1950])
- Stan Kenton Classics (Capitol, 1944–47 [1952])
- Artistry in Rhythm (Capitol, 1946)
- Encores (Capitol, 1947)
- A Presentation of Progressive Jazz (Capitol, 1947)
- Innovations in Modern Music (Capitol, 1950)
- Stan Kenton Presents (Capitol, 1950)
- City of Glass (Capitol, 1951)
- Popular Favorites by Stan Kenton (Capitol, 1953)
- This Modern World (Capitol, 1953)
- The Kenton Era (Capitol, 1940–54, [1955])
- The Innovations Orchestra (Capitol, 1950–51 [1997])
- Stan Kenton Conducts the Los Angeles Neophonic Orchestra (Capitol, 1965)
- Hair (Capitol, 1969)

With Barney Kessel

- Kessel Plays Standards (Contemporary, 1954–55)

With Shelly Manne

- The West Coast Sound (Contemporary, 1955)

With Jack Nitzsche

- Heart Beat (Capitol, 1980) – film soundtrack

With Art Pepper

- Showcase for Modern Jazz (Brunswick, 1958)

With Shorty Rogers

- Cool and Crazy (RCA Victor, 1953)
- Shorty Rogers Courts the Count (RCA Victor, 1954)
- Collaboration (RCA Victor, 1954) – with André Previn
- Afro-Cuban Influence (RCA Victor, 1958)
- Shorty Rogers Meets Tarzan (MGM, 1960) – film soundtrack

With Pete Rugolo

- Introducing Pete Rugolo (Columbia, 1954)
- Adventures in Rhythm (Columbia, 1954)
- Rugolomania (Columbia, 1955)
- New Sounds by Pete Rugolo (Harmony, 1954–55, [1957])
- Out on a Limb (EmArcy, 1956)
- An Adventure in Sound: Reeds in Hi-Fi (Mercury, 1956 [1958])
- Rugolo Plays Kenton (EmArcy, 1958)
- The Music from Richard Diamond (EmArcy, 1959)
- The Original Music of Thriller (Time, 1961)
- 10 Saxophones and 2 Basses (Mercury, 1961)

With Bud Shank

- Jazz at Cal-Tech (Pacific Jazz, 1956)
- Barefoot Adventure (Pacific Jazz, 1961)
- Bud Shank & the Sax Section (Pacific Jazz, 1966)
