= Shelly Manne discography =

This is the discography for American jazz drummer Shelly Manne.

== As leader ==
- Here's that Manne (Dee Gee, 1952)
- Shelly Manne Vol. 2 (Contemporary, 1954)
- The West Coast Sound (Contemporary, 1955) – rec. 1953–1955. Re-release of the first Shelly Manne & His Men 10-inch LP with additional material.
- Swinging Sounds (Contemporary, 1956)
- More Swinging Sounds (Contemporary, 1956)
- Shelly Manne & His Friends (Contemporary, 1956)
- My Fair Lady (Contemporary, 1956)
- Li'l Abner (Contemporary, 1957)
- Concerto for Clarinet & Combo (Contemporary, 1957) – rec. 1955-1957
- The Gambit (Contemporary, 1958) – rec. 1957-1958
- Bells Are Ringing (Contemporary, 1958)
- Shelly Manne & His Men Play Peter Gunn (Contemporary, 1959)
- Son of Gunn!! (Contemporary, 1959)
- At the Black Hawk 1 (Contemporary, 1959)
- At the Black Hawk 2 (Contemporary, 1959)
- At the Black Hawk 3 (Contemporary, 1959)
- At the Black Hawk 4 (Contemporary, 1959)
- "The Three" & "The Two" (Contemporary, 1960) – rec. 1954. Compilation of previously issued 10-inch LPs.
- The Proper Time (Contemporary, 1960) – Motion Picture Soundtrack
- Ruth Price with Shelly Manne & His Men at the Manne-Hole (Contemporary, 1961) – with Ruth Price
- Live! Shelly Manne & His Men at the Manne-Hole (Contemporary, 1961) – Double LP, reissued on 2 separate CDs
- Shelly Manne & His Men Play Checkmate (Contemporary, 1961)
- Sounds Unheard Of! (with Jack Marshall, Contemporary, 1962) – stereo demonstration record
- 2-3-4 (with Coleman Hawkins, Impulse!, 1962)
- Empathy (with Bill Evans, Verve, 1962)
- My Son the Jazz Drummer! (Contemporary, 1962) – reissued as Steps to the Desert in 2004
- My Fair Lady with the Un-original Cast (arranged and conducted by Johnny Williams with Jack Sheldon and Irene Kral; Capitol, 1964)
- Manne–That's Gershwin! (arranged and directed by John Williams; Capitol, 1965)
- Sounds! (with Jack Marshall, Capitol, 1966)
- Boss Sounds! (Atlantic, 1966)
- Jazz Gunn (Atlantic, 1967)
- Daktari (Atlantic, 1967)
- Young Billy Young (United Artists, 1969) – Motion Picture Soundtrack
- Outside (Contemporary, 1970) – rec. 1969
- Alive in London (Contemporary, 1970)
- Mannekind (Mainstream, 1972)
- Hot Coles (Flying Dutchman, 1975)
- The Drum Session with Louie Bellson, Willie Bobo and Paul Humphrey (Philips, 1975)
- Perk Up (Concord, 1976) – rec. 1967
- Rex: Shelly Manne Plays Richard Rogers (Discovery, 1976)
- Essence (Galaxy, 1977)
- French Concert (with Lee Konitz, Galaxy, 1979) – rec. 1977
- Double Piano Jazz Quartet — In Concert at Carmelo's (Trend, 1980)
- Hollywood Jam (Atlas, 1981)
- Fingering (with Monty Alexander and Ray Brown, Atlas, 1981)
- One on One (with Russ Freeman, Atlas, 1982)
- The Shelly Manne Trio in Zurich (Contemporary, 1984)
- At the Black Hawk 5 (Contemporary, 1991) – rec. 1959
- Jazz From the Pacific Northwest (Reel to Real, 2024) - rec. 1958 and 1966

== As sideman ==
With Chet Baker

- Chet Baker & Strings (Columbia, 1954)
- The Trumpet Artistry of Chet Baker (Pacific Jazz, 1955) – compilation
- Quartet: Russ Freeman/Chet Baker (Pacific Jazz, 1956)
- Pretty/Groovy (World Pacific, 1958) – rec. 1953-1954
- Witch Doctor (Contemporary, 1985) – rec. 1953
- Grey December (Pacific Jazz, 1992) – rec. 1953
- West Coast Live – with Stan Getz (Pacific Jazz, 1997) – live rec. 1954

With Elmer Bernstein

- The Man with the Golden Arm (Decca, 1956)
- Sweet Smell of Success (Decca, 1957)

With Benny Carter

- Jazz Giant (Contemporary, 1958)
- Swingin' the '20s (with Earl Hines, Contemporary, 1958)
- Aspects (United Artists, 1959)

With Teddy Charles

- Collaboration West (Prestige, 1953)
- Evolution (Prestige, 1957) – rec. 1953

With Nat King Cole

- Nat King Cole Sings/George Shearing Plays (Capitol, 1962)

With Buddy Collette

- Nice Day with Buddy Collette (Contemporary, 1957)
- At the Cinema! (Mercury, 1959)

With Maynard Ferguson

- Maynard Ferguson's Hollywood Party (EmArcy, 1954)
- Dimensions (EmArcy, 1955)
- Maynard Ferguson Octet (EmArcy, 1955)

With Stan Getz

- West Coast Jazz (Norgran, 1955)
- Hamp and Getz (with Lionel Hampton, Norgran, 1955)
- Stan Getz and the Cool Sounds (Verve, 1957) – rec. 1953-1955

With Jimmy Giuffre

- Jimmy Giuffre (Capitol, 1955)
- The Jimmy Giuffre Clarinet (Atlantic, 1956)

With Hampton Hawes

- Four! (Contemporary, 1958)
- Hampton Hawes at the Piano (Contemporary, 1978) – rec. 1976

With Lena Horne

- Stormy Weather (RCA Victor, 1957)
- Lena...Lovely and Alive (RCA Victor, 1962)

With Quincy Jones

- Go West, Man! (ABC Paramount, 1957)
- Roots (A&M, 1977)

With Stan Kenton

- Stan Kenton's Milestones (Capitol, 1950) – rec. 1943-1947
- Stan Kenton Classics (Capitol, 1952) – rec. 1944-1947
- Artistry in Rhythm (Capitol, 1946)
- Encores (Capitol, 1947)
- A Presentation of Progressive Jazz (Capitol, 1947)
- Innovations in Modern Music (Capitol, 1950)
- Stan Kenton Presents (Capitol, 1950)
- City of Glass (Capitol, 1951)
- Popular Favorites by Stan Kenton (Capitol, 1953)
- This Modern World (Capitol, 1953)
- The Kenton Era (Capitol, 1955) – rec. 1940–1954
- Kenton with Voices (Capitol, 1957)
- Lush Interlude (Capitol, 1958)
- The Innovations Orchestra (Capitol, 1997) – rec. 1950-1951

With Barney Kessel

- Kessel Plays Standards (Contemporary, 1954)
- To Swing or Not to Swing (Contemporary, 1955)
- Easy Like (Contemporary, 1956) – rec. 1953–1956
- Music to Listen to Barney Kessel By (Contemporary, 1956)
- The Poll Winners with Ray Brown (Contemporary, 1957)
- The Poll Winners Ride Again! with Ray Brown (Contemporary, 1958)
- Carmen (Contemporary, 1959)
- Some Like It Hot (Contemporary, 1959)
- Poll Winners Three! (Contemporary, 1959)
- Exploring the Scene! (Contemporary, 1960)
- Let's Cook! (Contemporary, 1962) – rec. 1957

With Peggy Lee

- Things Are Swingin' (Capitol, 1958)
- I Like Men! (Capitol, 1959)
- If You Go (Capitol, 1961)

With Junior Mance

- Get Ready, Set, Jump!!! (Capitol, 1964)
- Straight Ahead! (Capitol, 1964)

With Henry Mancini

- More Music from Peter Gunn (RCA Victor, 1959)
- The Mancini Touch (RCA Victor, 1960)
- Combo! (RCA Victor, 1961)

With Jack Montrose

- Arranged by Montrose (Pacific Jazz, 1954)
- Arranged/Played/Composed by Jack Montrose (Atlantic, 1955)
- Jack Montrose Sextet (Pacific Jazz, 1955)
- Blues and Vanilla (RCA Victor, 1956)

With Mark Murphy

- Playing the Field (Capitol, 1960)

With Oliver Nelson

- Sound Pieces (Impulse!, 1966)
- Skull Session (Flying Dutchman, 1975)
- Stolen Moments (East Wind, 1975)

With Art Pepper

- The Return of Art Pepper (Jazz: West, 1956)
- Living Legend (Contemporary, 1975)
- Popo with Shorty Rogers (Xanadu, 1980) – rec. 1951

With André Previn

- Pal Joey (Contemporary, 1957)
- West Side Story (Contemporary, 1959)
- The Subterraneans: Soundtrack (MGM, 1960)
- A Different Kind of Blues (with Itzhak Perlman, Angel, 1980)

With Shorty Rogers

- Modern Sounds (Capitol, 1951)
- Shorty Rogers and His Giants (RCA Victor, 1953)
- Cool and Crazy (RCA Victor, 1953)
- Shorty Rogers Courts the Count (RCA Victor, 1954)
- Collaboration with André Previn (RCA Victor, 1954)
- The Swinging Mr. Rogers (Atlantic, 1955)
- Martians Come Back! (Atlantic, 1956) – rec. 1955
- Way Up There (Atlantic, 1957) – rec. 1955
- Afro-Cuban Influence (RCA Victor, 1958)
- The Fourth Dimension in Sound (Warner Bros., 1961)
- Bossa Nova (Reprise, 1962)
- Martians Stay Home (Atlantic, 1980) – rec. 1955

With Sonny Rollins

- Way Out West (Contemporary, 1957)
- Sonny Rollins and the Contemporary Leaders (Contemporary, 1958)

With Pete Rugolo

- Introducing Pete Rugolo (Columbia, 1954)
- Adventures in Rhythm (Columbia, 1954)
- Rugolomania (Columbia, 1955)
- New Sounds by Pete Rugolo (Harmony, 1957) – rec. 1954–1955
- Music for Hi-Fi Bugs (EmArcy, 1956)
- Out on a Limb (EmArcy, 1956)
- Percussion at Work (EmArcy, 1957)
- An Adventure in Sound: Reeds in Hi-Fi (Mercury, 1958) – rec. 1956
- Rugolo Plays Kenton (EmArcy, 1958)
- The Music from Richard Diamond (EmArcy, 1959)
- 10 Trombones Like 2 Pianos (Mercury, 1960)
- Ten Trumpets and 2 Guitars (Mercury, 1961)
- 10 Saxophones and 2 Basses (Mercury, 1961)

With Lalo Schifrin

- Gone with the Wave (Colpix, 1964)
- Music from Mission: Impossible (Dot, 1967)
- There's a Whole Lalo Schifrin Goin' On (Dot, 1968)

With Bud Shank

- Strings & Trombones (Pacific Jazz, 1955)
- Barefoot Adventure (Pacific Jazz, 1961)
- Windmills of Your Mind (Pacific Jazz, 1969)

With Frank Sinatra

- Come Dance with Me! (Capitol, 1959)

With Tom Waits

- Small Change (Asylum, 1976)
- Foreign Affairs (Asylum, 1977)

With others

- Elek Bacsik, Bird and Dizzy – a musical tribute (Flying Dutchman, 1975)
- Don Bagley, Basically Bagley (Dot, 1953)
- Brass Fever, Brass Fever (Impulse!, 1975)
- Teresa Brewer, A Sophisticated Lady (Columbia, 1981)
- Kenny Burrell, Heritage (AudioSource, 1980)
- Betty Carter, 'Round Midnight (Atco, 1963)
- June Christy, The Song Is June! (Capitol, 1958)
- Ornette Coleman, Tomorrow Is the Question! (Contemporary, 1959)
- Sonny Criss, I'll Catch the Sun! (Prestige, 1969)
- Duane Eddy, Because They're Young (Jaime, 1960)
- Bill Evans, A Simple Matter of Conviction (Verve, 1966)
- Art Farmer, On the Road (Contemporary, 1976)
- Ella Fitzgerald, Whisper Not (Verve, 1967)
- The Four Freshmen, Voices In Latin (Capitol, 1958)
- The Four Freshmen, The Four Freshmen and Five Guitars (Capitol, 1959)
- The Four Freshmen, First Affair (Capitol, 1960)
- The Four Freshmen, More Four Freshmen and 5 Trombones (Capitol, 1964)
- Dizzy Gillespie, The Complete RCA Victor Recordings (Bluebird, 1995) – rec. 1937–1949
- Johnny Hartman, I Love Everybody (ABC, 1967)
- Richard "Groove" Holmes, Six Million Dollar Man, (RCA, 1975)
- Paul Horn, Plenty of Horn (Dot, 1958)
- Joni James, After Hours (MGM, 1963)
- The Jazz Afro-Cuban Beat, Hot Skins (Interlude, 1959)
- Hank Jones, Just for Fun (Galaxy, 1977)
- John Klemmer, Constant Throb (Impulse!, 1971)
- Jimmy Knepper, Jimmy Knepper in L.A. (Discomate, 1978) – rec. 1977
- Andy LaVerne, Captain Video (Atlas, 1981)
- John Lewis, Kansas City Breaks (Finesse, 1982)
- Johnny Mandel, I Want to Live (United Artists, 1958)
- Barry Manilow, 2:00 AM Paradise Cafe (Arista, 1984)
- Warne Marsh, Live in Hollywood (Xanadu, 1979) – rec. 1952
- Bill Mays, Tha's Delights (Trend, 1983)
- Howard McGhee, Maggie's Back in Town!! (Contemporary, 1961)
- Bette Midler, Broken Blossom (Atlantic, 1977)
- Gerry Mulligan, I Want to Live (United Artists, 1958)
- Jack Nitzsche, Heart Beat: Soundtrack (Capitol, 1980)
- Linda Perhacs, Parallelograms (Kapp, 1970)
- Red Rodney, Superbop (Muse, 1974)
- Joe Sample and Ray Brown, The Three (East Wind, 1975)
- George Shearing, Out of the Woods (Capitol, 1965) – rec. 1964
- Zoot Sims, The Swinger (Pablo, 1979)
- Sonny Stitt, Dumpy Mama (Flying Dutchman, 1975)
- Dan Terry, The Complete Vita Recordings of Dan Terry (Vita, 1952)
- Captain & Tennille, Dream (A&M, 1978)
- Cal Tjader, Breathe Easy (Galaxy, 1978) – rec. 1977
- Mel Tormé, Tormé (Verve, 1958)
- Mel Tormé, I Dig the Duke! I Dig the Count! (Verve, 1962)
- Mel Tormé, Mel Tormé Sings Sunday in New York & Other Songs About New York (Atlantic, 1963)
- Joe Williams, With Love (Temponic, 1972)
- Nancy Wilson, The Sound of Nancy Wilson (Capitol, 1968)
- Frank Zappa, Lumpy Gravy (Verve, 1968)
