= Jazz Erotica =

Studio album by Richie Kamuca and Bill Holman
- Released: November 1957
- Recorded: May 26–27, 1957
- Genre: Jazz
- Length: 40:57
- Label: HIFI Records

Professional ratings
Review scores
Source	Rating
AllMusic	4/5 stars
Five Cents Please	3/5 stars
The Penguin Guide to Jazz Recordings	3/4 stars

Jazz Erotica is a 1957 jazz album by American tenor saxophone player Richie Kamuca and baritone saxophone player Bill Holman. It was rereleased in 1959, without the "quite revealing painting of a nude woman on the cover", under the "more conventional title" West Coast Jazz in Hifi.

AllMusic critic Ken Dryden commented that one should expect to pay "a premium price" for it. Tim Neely's Goldmine Jazz Album Price Guide (2011) suggests $200 for a near-mint copy.

== Track listing ==
Side One
No.	Title	Writer(s)	Length
1.	"'Way Down Under"	Bill Holman	3:32
2.	"Blue Jazz"	Richie Kamuca	4:20
3.	"Angel Eyes"	Matt Dennis; Earl Brunt	3:55
4.	"Stella By Starlight"	Victor Young; Ned Washington	3:19
5.	"Star Eyes"	Don Raye; Gene de Paul	4:34

Side Two
No.	Title	Writer(s)	Length
6.	"I Hadn't Anyone Till You"	Ray Noble	4:23
7.	"Linger Awhile"	Vincent Rose; Harry Owens	3:42
8.	"The Things We Did Last Summer"	Jule Styne; Sammy Cahn	4:37
9.	"If You Were No One"	Bill Holman	4:02
10.	"Indiana"	James F. Hanley; Ballard MacDonald	4:33
Total length:			40:57

== Personnel ==
- Richie Kamuca – tenor saxophone
- Bill Holman – baritone saxophone
- Frank Rosolino – trombone
- Conte Candoli – trumpet
- Ed Leddy – trumpet
- Vince Guaraldi – piano
- Monty Budwig – bass
- Stan Levey – drums
