= At the Black Hawk 1 =

Live album by Shelly Manne & His Men
- Released: 1960
- Recorded: September 22–24, 1959
- Venue: The Black Hawk in San Francisco, California
- Genre: Jazz
- Length: 41:53
- Label: Contemporary M3577/S7577
- Producer: Lester Koenig

Shelly Manne chronology
Son of Gunn!! (1959)	At the Black Hawk 1 (1960)	At the Black Hawk 2 (1959)

At the Black Hawk 1 is a live album by drummer Shelly Manne's group Shelly Manne & His Men, recorded at the Black Hawk in San Francisco, California, in 1959 and released on the Contemporary label. The album was the first volume of four originally released in 1960. In 1991, the albums were re-released on CD with bonus tracks along with a fifth volume of unreleased recordings, and a Complete Live at the Black Hawk box set was released in 2010.

== Reception ==
Professional ratings
Review scores
Source	Rating
AllMusic	3/5 stars
The Rolling Stone Jazz Record Guide	5/5 stars
Penguin Guide to Jazz	👑

The AllMusic review by Scott Yanow states: "The extended performances are easily recommended to straight-ahead jazz fans".

== Track listing ==
1. "Summertime" (George Gershwin, DuBose Heyward) – 12:01
2. "Our Delight" (Tadd Dameron) – 12:03
3. "Poinciana" (Nat Simon, Buddy Bernier) – 13:17
4. "Blue Daniel" (Frank Rosolino) – 8:43
5. "Blue Daniel" [alternate take] (Rosolino) – 8:15 Bonus track on CD reissue
6. "Theme: A Gem from Tiffany" (Bill Holman) – 0:49
- Recorded at the Black Hawk, San Francisco on September 22 (tracks 1–3), September 23 (track 5) and September 24 (tracks 4 & 6), 1959.

== Personnel ==
- Shelly Manne – drums
- Joe Gordon – trumpet
- Richie Kamuca – tenor saxophone
- Victor Feldman – piano
- Monty Budwig – bass
