= The Proper Time =

- Theatrical release poster
- Directed by: Tom Laughlin
- Written by: Tom Laughlin
- Produced by: Tom Laughlin
- Starring: Tom Laughlin; Nira Monsour; Norma Quine; Richard Shannon; Dennis O'Flaherty; Kip King; Ray Loza; Connie Davis; Al Randall; Roger Rollie
- Cinematography: James Crabe
- Music by: Shelly Manne
- Distributed by: Lopert Films
- Release date: October 2, 1962 (US)
- Running time: 77 minutes
- Country: United States
- Language: English

The Proper Time is a 1961 film starring Tom Laughlin. Shot for roughly $28,000 in 1958, it was Laughlin's directorial and screenwriting debut.

== Plot ==
Laughlin stars as Mickey Henderson, a student at UCLA with a speech impediment that goes away when he is in contact with girls. He starts a friendship with Sue (Norma Quine), but is seduced by her roommate Doreen (Nira Monsour). He and Doreen soon get engaged, but when he finds she has been cheating on him, he breaks up with her. Sue convinces him to go to a clinic for help with his speech problem.

== Cast and crew ==
- Tom Laughlin... Mickey Henderson
- Nira Monsour... Doreen
- Norma Quine... Sue Dawson
- Richard Shannon... Dr. Polery
- Alexandre Randal... Mr. Henderson
- Constance Davis... Mrs. Henderson

== Soundtrack ==
The Proper Time

Soundtrack album by Shelly Manne & His Men
- Released: 1961
- Recorded: December 7–14, 1959 & January 28, 1960; Contemporary Records Studio, Los Angeles, California
- Genre: Jazz
- Length: 46:31
- Labels: Contemporary; M3587/S7587
- Producer: Lester Koenig

Shelly Manne chronology
| At the Black Hawk 5 (1959) | The Proper Time (1961) | Ruth Price with Shelly Manne & His Men at the Manne-Hole (1961) |

The jazz score of The Proper Time was composed by Shelly Manne, recorded by his group Shelly Manne & His Men in late 1959 and early 1960, and released on the Contemporary label.

=== Reception ===
Professional ratings
Review scores
| Source | Rating |
|---|---|
| Allmusic | 3/5 stars |

The Allmusic site rated the album with 3 stars.

=== Track listing ===
All compositions by Shelly Manne

1. "Drum Solo" - 7:20
2. "Blue Stutter" - 4:03
3. "The Proper Time" - 4:01
4. "Happy Pool" - 4:03
5. "The Proper Time" - 2:09
6. "Doreen's Blues" - 1:29
7. "Exotic Moods" - 2:15
8. "Warm Water" - 4:16
9. "Doreen's Blues" - 3:16
10. "The Proper Time - 1:12
11. "Drum Solo" - 0:50
12. "Panic" - 1:44
13. "Fraternizing" - 1:45
14. "Doreen's Blues" - 1:43
15. "Fast Blues" - 0:42
16. "Piano Trio" - 1:46
17. "Doreen's Blues" - 2:15
18. "The Proper Time" - 1:20

=== Personnel ===
- Shelly Manne - drums
- Joe Gordon - trumpet
- Richie Kamuca - tenor saxophone
- Victor Feldman - piano
- Monty Budwig - bass

== See also ==
- List of American films of 1970
- List of American films of 1960
