= Richie Kamuca =

American jazz saxophonist (1930–1977)

Background information
- Born: Richard Kamuca; July 23, 1930; Philadelphia, Pennsylvania, U.S.
- Died: July 22, 1977 (aged 46) Los Angeles, California, U.S.
- Genres: Jazz, West Coast jazz
- Occupation: Musician
- Instrument: Tenor saxophone
- Years active: 1950s–1970s
- Labels: Atlantic, Impulse!, Contemporary, Pacific Jazz
- Formerly of: Bill Perkins, Art Pepper, Bill Holman, Conte Candoli, Shelly Manne

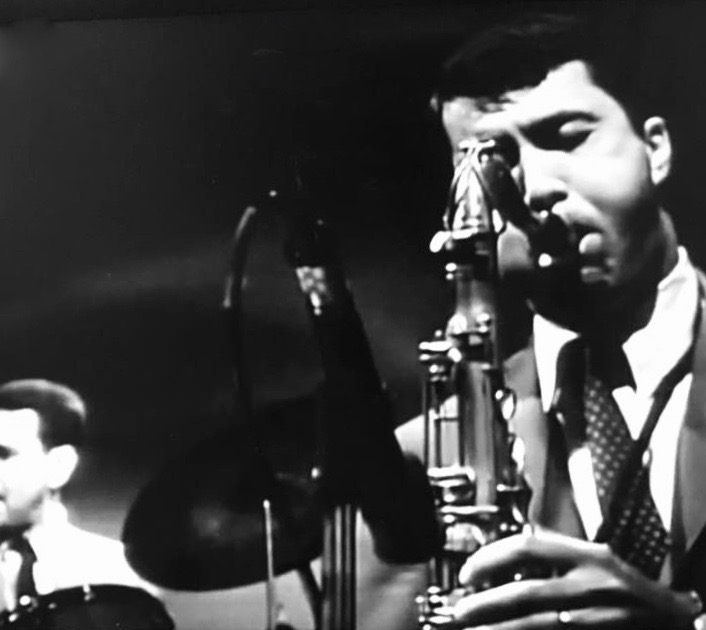
Ritchie Kamuca with Shelly Manne

Richard "Richie" Kamuca (July 23, 1930 – July 22, 1977) was an American jazz tenor saxophonist.

== Musical career ==
Kamuca was born in Philadelphia, Pennsylvania, United States, and, like many players associated with West Coast jazz, grew up in the East before moving West around the time that bebop changed the prevailing style of jazz. His early playing, in what is generally considered the Lester Young style, was done on tour with the big bands of Stan Kenton and Woody Herman, where he became a member of the later line-ups of Herman's Four Brothers saxophone section with Al Cohn and Bill Perkins.

Kamuca stayed on the West Coast, playing with the smaller groups of Chet Baker, Maynard Ferguson, Shorty Rogers, and others. He was one of the Lighthouse All-Stars in 1957 and 1958, and recorded with Perkins, Art Pepper, Jimmy Rowles, Cy Touff and many others in those years, as well as leading recording sessions in his own right.

Kamuca was a member of the group Shelly Manne and His Men from 1959 through 1962, when he returned East and settled in New York. Here he worked with Gerry Mulligan, Gary McFarland, and Roy Eldridge, before returning to the West Coast in 1972, where he recorded in the studios and performed with local groups.

Less well known to the general public than saxophonists like Stan Getz, who played in a similar Lester Young-derived style, Kamuca died of cancer, in Los Angeles, California, just before his 47th birthday.

== Selected discography ==
=== As leader/co-leader ===
Year recorded	Title	Label	Year released	Personnel/Notes
1955	The Brothers! – with Al Cohn, Bill Perkins	RCA Victor	1956	Septet, with Al Cohn, Kamuca, Bill Perkins (tenor sax), Hank Jones (piano), Barry Galbraith (guitar), John Beal (bass), Chuck Flores (drums)
1956	Tenors Head-On – with Bill Perkins	Liberty	1957	Quintet, with Kamuca, Bill Perkins (tenor sax), Pete Jolly (piano), Red Mitchell (bass), Stan Levey (drums)
1956	Just Friends – with Art Pepper, Bill Perkins	Pacific Jazz	1957	Five tracks; quintet, with Kamuca (tenor sax), Bill Perkins (tenor sax, bass clarinet, flute), Hampton Hawes (piano), Red Mitchell (bass), Mel Lewis (drums)
1957	Richie Kamuca Quartet	Mode	1957	Quartet, with Kamuca (tenor sax), Carl Perkins (piano), Leroy Vinnegar (bass), Stan Levey (drums)
1957	Jazz Erotica – with Bill Holman	HiFi	1957	Octet, with Kamuca (tenor sax), Holman (baritone sax), Frank Rosolino (trombone), Conte Candoli, Ed Leddy (trumpet), Vince Guaraldi (piano), Monty Budwig (bass), Stan Levey (drums); reissued as West Coast Jazz in Hifi (Contemporary, 1959)
1957–58	Kamuca/Feldman/Tjader Featuring Scott LaFaro – with Victor Feldman, Cal Tjader	Vantage	1991	Six tracks; three quartet tracks, with Kamuca (tenor sax), Carl Perkins (piano), Leroy Vinnegar (bass), Tony Bazley (drums); three quintet tracks, with Kamuca (tenor sax), Frank Rosolino (trombone), Perkins (piano), Scott LaFaro (bass), Stan Levey (drums)
1965–66	Comin' Home Baby – with Roy Eldridge	Pumpkin Productions	1978	Quintet, with Kamuca (tenor sax), Eldridge (trumpet), Dick Katz (piano), Don Moore/Tommy Potter (bass), Eddie Locke (drums)
1970	Back to the Ballroom: Live at Donte's – 1970 – with Buddy Tate	SS Jazz	2009	Quintet, with Kamuca, Tate (tenor sax), Mundell Lowe (guitar), Monty Budwig (bass), Chuck Flores (drums)
1974	Live at Donte's – with Lee Konitz	Cellar Door	2010	Quintet, with Kamuca (tenor sax), Konitz (alto sax), Dolo Coker (piano), Leroy Vinnegar (bass), Jake Hanna (drums)
1976	Richard Kamuca Quartet 1976	Jazzz	1976	Quartet, with Kamuca (tenor sax, vocal), Mundell Lowe (guitar), Monty Budwig (bass), Nick Ceroli (drums); reissued as Richie (Concord Jazz, 1977)
1977	Drop Me Off in Harlem	Concord Jazz	1977	Duo, with Kamuca (tenor sax, vocal), Dave Frishberg (piano); trio, with Kamuca (tenor sax), Herb Ellis (guitar), Ray Brown (bass)
1977	Richie Kamuca's Charlie	Concord Jazz	1979	Quintet, with Kamuca (tenor sax), Blue Mitchell (trumpet), Jimmy Rowles (piano), Ray Brown (bass), Donald Bailey (drums)

=== As sideman ===
With Manny Albam

- The Jazz Greats of Our Time, Vol. 2 (Coral 1957)

With Chet Baker and Bud Shank

- Theme Music from "The James Dean Story" (Pacific Jazz, 1956)

With Chet Baker and Art Pepper

- The Route (Pacific Jazz 1956)

With Herb Ellis and Jimmy Giuffre

- Herb Ellis Meets Jimmy Giuffre (Verve, 1959)

With Maynard Ferguson

- Live at Peacock Lane 1956–1957 (Live in Los Angeles, with Kamuca in the band; Fresh Sound CD apparently unreleased on LP in lieu of Birdland recordings of 1957.)

With Terry Gibbs

- The Exciting Terry Gibbs Big Band – reissued as Dream Band, Vol. 4: Main Stem (Contemporary, 1961)
- Explosion! (Verve 1961, Contemporary, 1987 as Dream Band vol 5)

With Woody Herman

- Big New Herd At The Monterey Jazz Festival (Atlantic, 1959)

With Stan Kenton

- Popular Favorites by Stan Kenton (Capitol, 1953)
- Sketches on Standards (Capitol, 1953)
- The Kenton Era (Capitol, 1940–54, [1955])
- Kenton with Voices (Capitol, 1957)
- Back to Balboa (Capitol, 1958)
- The Ballad Style of Stan Kenton (Capitol, 1958)
- Kenton Live from the Las Vegas Tropicana (Capitol, 1959 [1961])

With Gary McFarland

- Point of Departure (Impulse!, 1963)

With Herbie Mann

- My Kinda Groove (Atlantic, 1964)
- Our Mann Flute (Atlantic, 1966)

With Shelly Manne

- Son of Gunn!! (Contemporary, 1959)
- At the Black Hawk 1 (Contemporary, 1959)
- At the Black Hawk 2 (Contemporary, 1959)
- At the Black Hawk 3 (Contemporary, 1959)
- At the Black Hawk 4 (Contemporary, 1959)
- At the Black Hawk 5 (Contemporary, 1959 [1991])
- Ruth Price with Shelly Manne & His Men at the Manne-Hole (Contemporary, 1961) with Ruth Price
- Live! Shelly Manne & His Men at the Manne-Hole (Contemporary, 1961)
- Shelly Manne & His Men Play Checkmate (Contemporary, 1961)

With the Modern Jazz Quartet

- Jazz Dialogue (Atlantic, 1965)

With Mark Murphy

- This Could Be the Start of Something (Capitol, 1958)

With Anita O'Day

- Cool Heat (Verve, 1959)

With Johnny Richards

- Something Else By Johnny Richards (Bethlehem, 1956)

With Shorty Rogers

- Portrait of Shorty (RCA Victor, 1957)
- Chances Are It Swings (RCA Victor, 1958)
- The Swingin' Nutcracker (RCA Victor, 1960; with Holman, Perkins and Art Pepper, Kamuca was part of the saxophone section on Rogers' big-band jazz version of Tchaikovsky's Nutcracker Suite.)

With Frank Rosolino

- Frank Rosolino Quintet (Mode 1957)

With Zoot Sims

- Hawthorne Nights (Pablo, 1977)

With Cy Touff

- His Octet & Quintet (Pacific Jazz, 1956)

== Filmography ==
- Kings Go Forth (1958) - Jazz Musician: Tenor Sax (uncredited)
- Adventures in Paradise (1961, TV Series) - Moody Simmons (final appearance)
