= Bells Are Ringing =

Bells Are Ringing may refer to:

- Bells Are Ringing (musical), a 1956 Broadway musical, or the title song
- Bells Are Ringing (album), a 1959 jazz album by Shelly Manne featuring compositions from the above musical
- Bells Are Ringing (film), a 1960 film based on the stage musical
- "Bells Are Ringing", a Russian song with lyrics by Stepan Skitalets
- "The Bells Are Ringing", a song from a They Might Be Giants album, Factory Showroom
