= West Coast Wailers =

Studio album by Conte Candoli & Lou Levy
- Released: February 1958
- Recorded: August 16 & 17, 1955; Los Angeles, CA
- Genre: Jazz
- Label: Atlantic; LP 1268
- Producer: Ahmet Ertegun

Conte Candoli chronology
Powerhouse Trumpet (1955)	West Coast Wailers (1958)	Conte Candoli Quartet (1957)

West Coast Wailers is an album by American jazz trumpeter Conte Candoli and pianist Lou Levy released on the Atlantic label in 1958.

== Reception ==
Professional ratings
Review scores
Source	Rating
Allmusic	4/5 stars

Allmusic noted "no matter whose name is in large print on the cover, it's the group that's performing ...Levy and Candoli got to make their statements up front, of course, but this was really a five-headed beast ...one that should have been given more of a hearing than just one album".

== Track listing ==
1. "Lover, Come Back to Me" (Sigmund Romberg, Oscar Hammerstein II) - 8:15
2. "Comes Love" (Sam H. Stept, Lew Brown, Charles Tobias) - 4:15
3. "Lover Man" (Jimmy Davis, Ram Ramirez, James Sherman) - 3:36
4. "Pete's Alibi" (Pete Candoli) - 3:26
5. "Cheremoya" (Bill Holman) - 5:50
6. "Jordu" (Duke Jordan) - 4:56
7. "Flamingo" (Ted Grouya, Edmund Anderson) - 5:23
8. "Marcia Lee" (Conte Candoli) - 4:51

== Personnel ==
- Conte Candoli - trumpet
- Lou Levy - piano
- Bill Holman - tenor saxophone
- Leroy Vinnegar - bass
- Lawrence Marable - drums
