= Breathe Easy (album) =

Studio album by Cal Tjader
- Released: 1978
- Recorded: September 14 and 15, 1977
- Studio: Fantasy Studios, Berkeley, CA
- Genre: Jazz
- Label: Galaxy; GXY-5107
- Producer: Jim Stern, Cal Tjader

Cal Tjader chronology
Cuban Fantasy (1977)	Breathe Easy (1978)	Huracán (1978)

Breathe Easy is an album by vibraphonist Cal Tjader which was recorded in 1977 and released on the Galaxy label in the following year.

== Reception ==
Professional ratings
Review scores
Source	Rating
AllMusic	3/5 stars

The AllMusic review by Scott Yanow stated "Vibraphonist Cal Tjader had a chance to display his jazz roots on this straightahead quintet set. Tjader stretches out in conventional fashion on six familiar standards ... The interpretations overall are relaxed, tasteful and swinging but somewhat uneventful and without any real surprises".

== Track listing ==
1. "Tangerine" (Victor Schertzinger, Johnny Mercer) – 8:59
2. "If You Could See Me Now" (Tadd Dameron) – 8:44
3. "The Way You Look Tonight" (Jerome Kern, Dorothy Fields) – 7:09
4. "When Lights Are Low" (Benny Carter, Spencer Williams) – 8:45
5. "Just Friends" (John Klenner, Sam M. Lewis) – 6:48
6. "Goodbye" (Gordon Jenkins) – 6:52

== Personnel ==
- Cal Tjader – vibraphone
- Allen Smith – trumpet
- Hank Jones – piano, electric piano
- Monty Budwig – bass
- Shelly Manne – drums
