= My Son the Jazz Drummer! =

Studio album by Shelly Manne
- Released: 1963
- Recorded: December 17, 18 & 20, 1962; Contemporary Records Studio, Los Angeles, California
- Genre: Jazz
- Label: Contemporary M3609/S7609
- Producer: Lester Koenig

Shelly Manne chronology
Empathy (1962)	My Son the Jazz Drummer! (1963)	My Fair Lady with the Un-original Cast (1964)

My Son the Jazz Drummer! (subtitled Modern Jazz Versions of Jewish and Israeli Songs) is an album by drummer Shelly Manne performing jazz adaptations of traditional and contemporary Jewish music, recorded in 1962 and released on the Contemporary label. The album was re-released on CD in 2004 as Steps to the Desert.

== Reception ==
Professional ratings
Review scores
Source	Rating
AllMusic	3/5 stars
New Record Mirror	3/5 stars

The Allmusic review by Scott Yanow states: "The arrangements by Rogers, Feldman, Edwards and Lennie Niehaus turn the music into modern mainstream jazz circa 1962, looking toward hard bop and the funky soul jazz that was popular during the era. ... more successful than one might expect".

== Track listing ==
1. "Hava Nagila" (Traditional) - 3:04
2. "Bei Mir Bistu Shein" (Sholom Secunda, Jacob Jacobs) - 4:10
3. "Yussel! Yussel!" (Nellie Cassman, Samuel Steinberg) - 3:47
4. "Zamar Nodad" (Traditional) - 3:43
5. "Bokrei Lachish" (Regev, Admon) - 5:33
6. "Tzena" (Issacher Miron) - 3:32
7. "Exodus" (Ernest Gold) - 4:35
8. "Di Grine Kuzine" (Abe Schwartz, Hyman Prizant) - 4:25
9. "My Yiddishe Momme" (Jack Yellen, Lew Pollack) - 3:39
10. "Orchah Bamidbar" (Zahavi, Karni) - 4:14

== Personnel ==
- Shelly Manne - drums
- Shorty Rogers - trumpet, flugelhorn, arranger
- Teddy Edwards - tenor saxophone, arranger
- Victor Feldman - vibraphone, piano, arranger
- Al Viola - guitar
- Monty Budwig - bass
- Lennie Niehaus - arranger
