= Shorty Rogers Plays Richard Rodgers =

Studio album by Shorty Rogers and His Giants
- Released: 1957
- Recorded: January 30, February 1 & 4 and April 3, 1957; Los Angeles, CA
- Genre: Jazz
- Length: 42:39
- Label: RCA Victor; LPM 1428

Shorty Rogers chronology
Wherever the Five Winds Blow (1956)	Shorty Rogers Plays Richard Rodgers (1957)	Portrait of Shorty (1957)

Shorty Rogers Plays Richard Rodgers is an album by American jazz trumpeter and arranger Shorty Rogers performing songs composed by Richard Rodgers, issued by RCA Victor in 1957.

== Reception ==
Professional ratings
Review scores
Source	Rating
Allmusic	4/5 stars
Disc	3/5 stars

Allmusic awarded the album 4 stars.

== Track listing ==
All compositions by Richard Rodgers and Lorenz Hart.

1. "I've Got Five Dollars" - 3:44
2. "Ten Cents a Dance" - 5:17
3. "Mountain Greenery" - 6:13
4. "A Ship Without a Sail" - 3:28
5. "Mimi" - 3:11
6. "It's Got to Be Love" - 3:58
7. "I Could Write a Book" - 4:17
8. "The Girl Friend" - 3:49
9. "On a Desert Island with Thee" - 5:23
10. "Thou Swell" - 3:19
- Recorded in Los Angeles, CA on January 30, 1957 (tracks 3 & 9), February 1, 1957 (tracks 1 & 7), February 4, 1957 (tracks 4, 8 & 10) and April 3, 1957 (tracks 2, 5 & 6)

== Personnel ==
- Shorty Rogers - trumpet, arranger
- Conte Candoli, Pete Candoli (tracks 1, 3, 7 & 9), Harry Edison (tracks 1, 3, 7 & 9), Maynard Ferguson (tracks 1, 3, 7 & 9), Al Porcino (tracks 1, 3, 7 & 9) - trumpet
- Milt Bernhardt (tracks 1, 3, 7 & 9), Bob Burgess (tracks 1, 3, 7 & 9), John Halliburton (tracks 3 & 9), George Roberts (tracks 1 & 7), Frank Rosolino (tracks 1, 3, 7 & 9) - trombone
- Sam Rice - tuba (tracks 1, 3, 7 & 9)
- Herb Geller - alto saxophone
- Bill Holman, Jack Montrose (tracks 1, 3, 7 & 9), Bill Perkins (tracks 1, 3, 7 & 9) - tenor saxophone
- Pepper Adams (tracks 1, 3, 4 & 7–10), Jimmy Giuffre (tracks 2, 5 & 6) - baritone saxophone
- Pete Jolly - piano
- Red Mitchell - bass
- Stan Levey - drums
