= Empathy (Bill Evans and Shelly Manne album) =

Studio album by Bill Evans and Shelly Manne
- Released: November 1962
- Recorded: August 14, 1962
- Studio: Van Gelder Studio, Englewood Cliffs, NJ
- Genre: Jazz
- Length: 34:54
- Label: Verve; V6-8497
- Producer: Creed Taylor

Bill Evans chronology
Interplay (1962)	Empathy (1962)	Loose Blues (1962)

Shelly Manne chronology
2-3-4 (1962)	Empathy (1962)	My Son the Jazz Drummer! (1962)

Professional ratings
Review scores
Source	Rating
DownBeat	4.5/5 stars
AllMusic	4/5 stars

Empathy is a 1962 album by jazz musicians Bill Evans and Shelly Manne. It was recorded and released by Verve Records, the label Evans joined a year after the recording session. The album came about when Manne and Evans were sharing a bill at New York's Village Vanguard nightclub and Verve producer Creed Taylor proposed a studio collaboration for the two bandleaders. Riverside Records, Evans' label during 1962, allowed Evans to participate, and the trio was completed by Manne's bass player of the time, Monty Budwig. The album features some classic jazz standards and two songs by Irving Berlin from the 1962 musical Mr. President. The sculpture on the album cover was by Sheldon Machlin.

== Reception ==
Leonard Feather had this to say about the album in his April 11, 1963, review in DownBeat magazine: "Essentially the focus is on Evans, as it should be; yet because of the skill with which he and Manne cooperated, one is often conscious that an important interplay is involved, one that lifts the results far out of the normal piano-with-rhythm class."

Reviewing the album for AllMusic, David Nathan wrote: "[Evans'] playing seemed lighter, freer, and more relaxed than it had for a while. ... Listening to these three [Evans, Manne, Budwig], it's clear that everyone was having a good time and simply enjoying being relieved of their duties with their regular combos, even if for just one day."

== Track listing ==
1. "The Washington Twist" (Irving Berlin) – 6:26
2. "Danny Boy" (Frederic Weatherly) - 3:42
3. "Let's Go Back to the Waltz" (Irving Berlin) – 4:30
4. "With a Song in My Heart" (Richard Rodgers, Lorenz Hart) - 9:12
5. "Goodbye" (Gordon Jenkins) - 5:12
6. "I Believe in You" (Frank Loesser) - 5:52

== Personnel ==
- Bill Evans - piano
- Monty Budwig - bass
- Shelly Manne - drums
