= Son of Gunn!! =

Studio album by Shelly Manne & His Men
- Released: 1959
- Recorded: January 19 & 20, 1959; Contemporary Records Studio, Los Angeles, California
- Genre: Jazz
- Length: 41:42
- Label: Contemporary M3566/S7566
- Producer: Lester Koenig

Shelly Manne chronology
| Shelly Manne & His Men Play Peter Gunn (1959) | Son of Gunn!! (1959) | At the Black Hawk 1 (1959) |

Son of Gunn!! (subtitled Shelly Manne & His Men Play More Music from Peter Gunn) is an album by Shelly Manne & His Men, the second featuring compositions from Henry Mancini's score from the TV show Peter Gunn, which was recorded in 1959 and released on the Contemporary label.

== Reception ==
Professional ratings
Review scores
| Source | Rating |
|---|---|
| AllMusic | 2.5/5 stars |
| The Penguin Guide to Jazz Recordings | 3/4 stars |

The AllMusic review by Scott Yanow states: "Recorded only five months after the release of Shelly Manne & His Men Play Peter Gunn, Son of Gunn!! sounds exactly like what it is: jazz musicians taking ostensibly generic background music for a television show and trying to make something more out of it. Apparently, even Mancini was aware of the challenge these musicians were facing, and encouraged them to apply free interpretations on these ten cuts and not to worry about maintaining a 'Mancini feeling.' ... In retrospect, this isn't a horrible set, just one that should have focused less on concept and more on vision".

== Track listing ==
All compositions by Henry Mancini

1. "Odd Ball" - 3:32
2. "Blue Steel" - 4:57
3. "Spook!" - 5:19
4. "Joanna" - 4:08
5. "Goofin' at the Coffee House" - 3:47
6. "Walkin' Bass" - 4:23
7. "My Manne Shelly" - 3:37
8. "Blues for Mother's" - 4:23
9. "A Quiet Gass" - 4:33
10. "Lightly" - 3:34

== Personnel ==
- Shelly Manne - drums
- Joe Gordon - trumpet
- Richie Kamuca - alto saxophone
- Victor Feldman - vibraphone, marimba
- Russ Freeman - piano
- Monty Budwig - bass
- Henry Mancini - arranger
