= Ruth Price with Shelly Manne & His Men at the Manne-Hole =

Live album by Ruth Price with Shelly Manne & His Men
- Released: 1961
- Recorded: March 3, 4 & 5, 1961; Shelly's Manne-Hole in Hollywood, California
- Genre: Jazz
- Length: 41:20
- Label: Contemporary M 3590/S7590
- Producer: Lester Koenig

Shelly Manne chronology
The Proper Time (1960)	Ruth Price with Shelly Manne & His Men at the Manne-Hole (1961)	Live! Shelly Manne & His Men at the Manne-Hole (1961)

Ruth Price chronology
The Party's Over (1957)	Ruth Price with Shelly Manne & His Men at the Manne-Hole (1961)	Live and Beautiful (1963)

Ruth Price with Shelly Manne & His Men at the Manne-Hole is a live album by vocalist Ruth Price with drummer Shelly Manne's group Shelly Manne & His Men, recorded at Shelly's Manne-Hole in Hollywood, California, in 1961 and released on the Contemporary label.

== Reception ==
Professional ratings
Review scores
Source	Rating
AllMusic	4.5/5 stars
The Penguin Guide to Jazz Recordings	3/4 stars

The AllMusic review by Scott Yanow states: "Singer Ruth Price on this early set falls somewhere between swinging jazz, middle-of-the-road pop, and cabaret. She does not improvise much, but her strong and very appealing voice uplifts the diverse material that she interprets".

== Track listing ==
1. "I Love You" (Cole Porter) – 2:47
2. "They Say It's Spring" (Marty Clark, Bob Haymes) – 3:35
3. "Listen Little Girl" (Fran Landesman, Tommy Wolf) – 4:41
4. "Dearly Beloved" (Jerome Kern, Johnny Mercer) – 2:38
5. "I Know Why" (Harry Warren, Mack Gordon) – 3:57
6. "Shadrack" (Robert MacGimsey) – 3:31
7. "Crazy He Calls Me" (Carl Sigman, Bob Russell) – 4:29
8. "Nobody Else but Me" (Kern, Oscar Hammerstein II) – 2:55
9. "Nobody's Heart" (Richard Rodgers, Lorenz Hart) – 4:32
10. "All I Do Is Dream of You" (Nacio Herb Brown, Arthur Freed) – 2:06
11. "Who Am I" (Leonard Bernstein) – 4:19
12. "Till the Clouds Roll By/Look for the Silver Lining" (Kern, P. G. Wodehouse/Kern, Buddy DeSylva) – 3:30

== Personnel ==
- Ruth Price – vocals
- Shelly Manne – drums
- Conte Candoli – trumpet
- Richie Kamuca – tenor saxophone
- Russ Freeman – piano
- Chuck Berghofer – bass
