= Swinging Kicks =

Studio album by Buddy Bregman
- Released: 1957
- Recorded: December 18 and 20, 1956
- Studio: Capitol (Hollywood)
- Genre: Jazz
- Length: 38:45
- Label: Verve MGV 2042

Professional ratings
Review scores
Source	Rating
AllMusic	4.5/5 stars

Swinging Kicks is a 1957 album by the jazz arranger Buddy Bregman. The album was released as I Love Listening to Buddy Bregman by His Master's Voice in the United Kingdom.

== Reception ==
Scott Yanow reviewed the album for AllMusic and wrote that it was "Because many of the selections are brief (seven are under two minutes) and due to the intriguing titles, this seems a bit like a soundtrack to a film that was never made. However, few of the tracks seem truncated and there are some excellent solos along the way, particularly from Ben Webster, Conte Candoli, Herb Geller, Bud Shank, and Paul Smith. ...Bregman uses some of the top West Coast jazz players and various musicians who were on Verve at the time, with Stan Getz making a guest appearance on "Honey Chile". Recommended".

== Track listing ==
1. "Wild Party" – 3:22
2. "Melody Room" – 1:24
3. "Bada Blues" – 2:56
4. "Kicks Swings" – 2:11
5. "Melody Lane" – 1:51
6. "Lost Keys" – 1:51
7. "Go Kicks" – 1:25
8. "Gage Flips" – 2:13
9. "Derek's Blues" – 2:49
10. "Mulliganville" – 1:35
11. "Terror Ride" – 2:15
12. "The Flight" – 3:46
13. "Tom's Idea" – 2:02
14. "Melodyville" – 1:56
15. "Honey Chile" – 2:33
16. "End of Party" – 1:18
17. "Kicks Is In Love" – 3:18

== Personnel ==
- Buddy Bregman – arranger, conductor
- Bud Shank, Herb Geller – alto saxophone
- Jimmy Giuffre – baritone saxophone
- Al Hendrickson – guitar
- Ben Webster, Bob Cooper, Georgie Auld, Stan Getz – tenor saxophone
- Frank Rosolino, George Roberts, Lloyd Ulyate, Milt Bernhart – trombone
- Conrad Gozzo, Conte Candoli, Maynard Ferguson, Pete Candoli, Ray Linn – trumpet
- André Previn, Paul Smith – piano
- Joe Mondragon – double bass
- Alvin Stoller, Stan Levey – drums
