= At the Black Hawk 2 =

Live album by Shelly Manne & His Men
- Released: 1960
- Recorded: September 22–24, 1959
- Venue: The Black Hawk in San Francisco, California
- Genre: Jazz
- Length: 41:53
- Label: Contemporary M3578/S7578
- Producer: Lester Koenig

Shelly Manne chronology
At the Black Hawk 1 (1959)	At the Black Hawk 2 (1960)	At the Black Hawk 3 (1959)

At the Black Hawk 2 is a live album by drummer Shelly Manne's group Shelly Manne & His Men, recorded at the Black Hawk in San Francisco, California, in 1959 and released on the Contemporary label. The album was the second volume of four originally released in 1960. In 1991, the albums were re-released on CD with bonus tracks along with a fifth volume of unreleased recordings, and a Complete Live at the Black Hawk box set was released in 2010.

== Reception ==
Professional ratings
Review scores
Source	Rating
AllMusic	4/5 stars
The Rolling Stone Jazz Record Guide	3/5 stars

The AllMusic review by Scott Yanow states: "These lengthy performances ("Vamp's Blues" is over 19 minutes long) give trumpeter Joe Gordon, the cool-toned tenor-saxophonist Richie Kamuca, pianist Victor Feldman, bassist Monty Budwig and the leader/drummer a chance to really stretch out. Fine 1950s bebop".

== Track listing ==
1. "Step Lightly" (Benny Golson) - 12:59
2. "What's New?" (Bob Haggart, Johnny Burke) - 13:28
3. "Vamp's Blues" (Charlie Mariano) - 20:14
4. "Step Lightly" [alternate take] (Golson) - 14:18 Bonus track on CD reissue
5. "Theme: A Gem from Tiffany" (Bill Holman) - 0:42
- Recorded at the Black Hawk, San Francisco on September 22 (track 4) and September 24 (tracks 1–3 & 5), 1959.

== Personnel ==
- Shelly Manne - drums
- Joe Gordon - trumpet
- Richie Kamuca - tenor saxophone
- Victor Feldman - piano
- Monty Budwig - bass
