= Conte Candoli Quartet =

Studio album by Conte Candoli
- Released: October 1957
- Recorded: June 1957
- Studio: Radio Recorders, Hollywood, California
- Genre: Jazz
- Length: 31:23
- Label: Mode; MOD-LP 109
- Producer: Red Clyde

Conte Candoli chronology
| West Coast Wailers (1955) | Conte Candoli Quartet (1957) | Mucho Calor (1957) |

Conte Candoli Quartet is an album by trumpeter Conte Candoli recorded in 1957 and originally released on the Mode label.

== Reception ==
Professional ratings
Review scores
| Source | Rating |
|---|---|
| AllMusic | 4.5/5 stars |

The AllMusic review by Scott Yanow noted: " In addition to the joy of hearing Candoli so well-showcased, this set is recommended because of the interesting repertoire".

== Track listing ==
1. "Something for Liza" (Al Cohn) - 4:04
2. "Walkie Talkie" (Pete Candoli) - 4:26
3. "Flamingo" (Ted Grouya, Edmund Anderson) - 3:13
4. "Mediolistic" (Osie Johnson) - 4:21
5. "Tara Ferma" (Pete Candoli) - 5:11
6. "Diane" (Lew Pollack, Ernö Rapée) - 3:43
7. "No Moon at All" (Redd Evans, Dave Mann) - 2:37
8. "Mambo Blues" (Conte Candoli) - 3:48

== Personnel ==
- Conte Candoli - trumpet
- Vince Guaraldi - piano
- Monty Budwig - bass
- Stan Levey - drums
