= Jazz Gunn =

Album by Shelly Manne

Studio album by Shelly Manne
- Released: 1967
- Recorded: June 19 & 20, 1967; Annex Recording Studios, Hollywood, CA
- Genre: Jazz
- Length: 38:36
- Label: Atlantic SD 1487
- Producer: Nesuhi Ertegun

Shelly Manne chronology
Boss Sounds! (1966)	Jazz Gunn (1967)	Perk Up (1967)

Jazz Gunn (subtitled Shelly Manne & His Men Play Henry Mancini's music for the Film "Gunn") is an album by drummer Shelly Manne recorded in 1967, featuring music by Henry Mancini written for the motion picture Gunn, and released on the Atlantic label.

== Reception ==
Professional ratings
Review scores
Source	Rating
AllMusic	2/5 stars

The AllMusic site rated the album 2 stars.

== Track listing ==
All compositions by Henry Mancini

1. "A Bluish Bag" - 7:18
2. "Silver Tears" - 5:20
3. "Sweet" - 6:49
4. "Theme for Sam" - 4:38
5. "A Quiet Happening" - 5:39
6. "Night Owl" - 4:55
7. "Peter Gunn" - 3:41

== Personnel ==
- Shelly Manne - drums
- Conte Candoli - trumpet, flugelhorn
- Frank Strozier - alto saxophone, flute
- Mike Wofford - piano
- Monty Budwig - bass
