= Boss Sounds! =

Live album by Shelly Manne
- Released: 1966
- Recorded: June 20, 1966; Shelly's Manne-Hole in Hollywood, CA
- Genre: Jazz
- Length: 43:36
- Label: Atlantic SD 1469
- Producer: Nesuhi Ertegun

Shelly Manne chronology
Sounds! (1966)	Boss Sounds! (1966)	Jazz Gunn (1967)

Boss Sounds! (subtitled Shelly Manne & His Men at Shelly's Manne-Hole) is a live album by drummer Shelly Manne recorded in 1966 and released on the Atlantic label.

== Reception ==
Professional ratings
Review scores
Source	Rating
AllMusic	3/5 stars
The Penguin Guide to Jazz Recordings	3/4 stars

The AllMusic review called it "Fine hard bop music".

== Track listing ==
1. "Margie" (Con Conrad, J. Russel Robinson, Benny Davis) - 7:31
2. "Idle One" (Frank Strozier) - 7:20
3. "The Breeze and I" (Ernesto Lecuona, Al Stillman) - 6:51
4. "Frank's Tune" (Strozier) - 9:25
5. "Wandering" (Don Specht) - 6:17
6. "You Name It" (Russ Freeman) - 6:19

== Personnel ==
- Shelly Manne - drums
- Conte Candoli - trumpet, flugelhorn
- Frank Strozier - alto saxophone
- Russ Freeman - piano
- Monty Budwig - bass
