= Perk Up =

Studio album by Shelly Manne
- Released: 1976
- Recorded: June 21 & 22, 1967; Annex Recording Studios, Hollywood, CA
- Genre: Jazz
- Length: 44:09
- Label: Concord Jazz CJ 21
- Producer: Shelly Manne

Shelly Manne chronology
Jazz Gunn (1967)	Perk Up (1976)	Daktari (1967)

Perk Up is an album by the drummer Shelly Manne recorded in 1967, but not released until an issue on the Concord Jazz label in 1976.

== Reception ==
Professional ratings
Review scores
Source	Rating
AllMusic	4/5 stars
The Rolling Stone Jazz Record Guide	3/5 stars
Tom Hull – on the Web	B+
The Virgin Encyclopedia of Jazz	3/5 stars

The AllMusic site review by Scott Yanow stated, "Although the musicians are all associated with the West Coast hard bop tradition, there are plenty of moments during this stimulating set when they make it obvious that they had been listening with some interest to some of the avant-garde players, allowing the new innovations to open up their styles a bit".

== Track listing ==
1. "Perk Up" (Jimmy Rowles) - 5:39
2. "I Married an Angel" (Richard Rodgers, Lorenz Hart) - 4:49
3. "Seer" (Frank Strozier) - 5:47
4. "Come Back" (Strozier) - 4:48
5. "Yesterdays" (Jerome Kern, Otto Harbach) - 5:12
6. "Drinkin' and Drivin'" (Rowles) - 6:39
7. "Bleep" (Mike Wofford) - 6:25
8. "Bird of Paradise" (Wofford) - 4:38

== Personnel ==
- Shelly Manne - drums
- Conte Candoli - trumpet
- Frank Strozier - alto saxophone, flute
- Mike Wofford - piano
- Monty Budwig - double bass
