= The Gambit (album) =

Studio album by Shelly Manne & His Men
- Released: 1958
- Recorded: January 4, July 17 & 25, 1957 and February 24, 1958; Contemporary Records Studio, Los Angeles, California
- Genre: Jazz
- Length: 39:09
- Label: Contemporary C3557/S7557
- Producer: Lester Koenig

Shelly Manne chronology
Concerto for Clarinet & Combo (1957)	The Gambit (1958)	Bells Are Ringing (1958)

The Gambit is an album by drummer Shelly Manne's group Shelly Manne & His Men, recorded at sessions in 1957 and 1958 and released on the Contemporary label.

== Reception ==
Professional ratings
Review scores
Source	Rating
Allmusic	3/5 stars
The Penguin Guide to Jazz Recordings	3.5/4 stars

The Allmusic site rated the album 3 stars.

== Track listing ==
All compositions by Charlie Mariano except as indicated

1. "The Gambit: Queen's Pawn" - 4:41
2. "The Gambit: En Passant" - 3:25
3. "The Gambit: Castling" - 4:25
4. "The Gambit: Checkmate" - 7:15
5. "Blue Gnu" - 6:42
6. "Tom Brown's Buddy" (Jim Hall) - 5:53
7. "Hugo Hurwhey" (Russ Freeman) - 6:32
- Recorded at Contemporary's studio in Los Angeles on January 4, 1957 (track 1), July 17, 1957 (track 2), July 25, 1957 (tracks 3 & 4) and February 24, 1958 (tracks 5–7).

== Personnel ==
- Shelly Manne - drums
- Stu Williamson - trumpet, valve trombone
- Charlie Mariano - alto saxophone
- Russ Freeman - piano
- Monty Budwig - bass
