= Sounds! =

Studio album by Jack Marshall and Shelly Manne
- Released: 1966
- Recorded: 1966
- Studio: Capitol (Hollywood)
- Genre: Jazz
- Length: 33:25
- Label: Capitol T/ST 2610
- Producer: Dave Cavanaugh

Shelly Manne chronology
Manne–That's Gershwin! (1965)	Sounds! (1966)	Boss Sounds! (1966)

Sounds! (subtitled The Sensitive Guitar and Exciting Percussion of Jack Marshall and Shelly Manne) is an album by drummer Shelly Manne and guitarist Jack Marshall released in early 1966 on the Capitol label. The album follows Sounds Unheard Of!, the duo's 1962 stereo test and demonstration record released on Contemporary.

== Reception ==
Professional ratings
Review scores
Source	Rating
AllMusic	3/5 stars

Allmusic rated the album with 3 stars. On Audiophilia.com, Roy Harris wrote: "While the goal of the producer probably was the maximization of sound quality, it may have led to an unintended consequence, namely the subservience of the music to the sound. While the cause may have been percussion 'pyrotechnics', I found the novel and unusual arrangements of familiar melodies interesting, and not indicative of a devaluation of the musical content".

== Track listing ==
1. "Theme from "Lawrence of Arabia"" (Maurice Jarre) - 2:15
2. "Sweet Sue, Just You" (Victor Young, Will J. Harris) - 2:25
3. "All the Things You Are" (Jerome Kern, Oscar Hammerstein II) - 3:10
4. "Choros" (Heitor Villa-Lobos) - 2:02
5. "Am I Blue?" (Harry Akst, Grant Clarke) - 3:15
6. "The Rain in Spain" (Frederick Loewe, Alan Jay Lerner) - 2:48
7. "Spanish Dance No. 5" (Enrique Granados) - 3:20
8. "S'posin'" (Paul Denniker, Andy Razaf) - 2:07
9. "Yesterdays" (Jerome Kern, Otto Harbach) - 2:54
10. "The Girls of Sao Paulo" (Shelly Manne, Jack Marshall) - 1:51
11. "A Day in Brazil Medley: Carnival/Sweet Happy Life" (Luiz Bonfá) - 4:18

== Personnel ==
- Shelly Manne - percussion
- Jack Marshall - classical guitar
