= Concerto for Clarinet & Combo =

Studio album by Shelly Manne & His Men
- Released: 1957
- Recorded: December 6, 1955 and July 24 & 25, 1957; Contemporary Records Studio, Los Angeles, California
- Genre: Jazz
- Label: Contemporary C3536
- Producer: Lester Koenig

Shelly Manne chronology
| Li'l Abner (1957) | Concerto for Clarinet & Combo (1957) | The Gambit (1958) |

Concerto for Clarinet & Combo (full title Premiere Recording of Concerto for Clarinet & Combo by Bill Smith, with the Composer on Clarinet, & Bags' Groove, Sophisticated Rabbit, My Old Flame) is an album by drummer Shelly Manne's group Shelly Manne & His Men recorded at sessions in 1955 and 1957 and released on the Contemporary label.

== Reception ==
Professional ratings
Review scores
| Source | Rating |
|---|---|
| AllMusic | 4/5 stars |

The AllMusic review by Scott Yanow states: "All in all, this is a well-balanced and continually interesting set that deserves to be reissued".

== Track listing ==
1. "Concerto For Clarinet & Combo: First Movement" (Bill Smith) - 5:14
2. "Concerto For Clarinet & Combo: Second Movement" (Smith) - 8:27
3. "Concerto For Clarinet & Combo: Third Movement" (Smith) - 6:39
4. "Sophisticated Rabbit" (Shelly Manne) - 3:22
5. "My Old Flame" (Arthur Johnston, Sam Coslow) - 5:54
6. "Bags' Groove" (Milt Jackson) - 10:52
- Recorded at Contemporary's studio in Los Angeles on December 6, 1955 (tracks 5 & 6), July 24 1957 (tracks 1–3), and July 25, 1957 (track 4).

== Personnel ==
- Shelly Manne - drums
- Stu Williamson - trumpet, valve trombone
- Bob Enevoldsen - valve trombone (tracks 1–3)
- Vincent DeRosa - French horn (tracks 1–3)
- Bill Smith - clarinet (tracks 1–3)
- Charlie Mariano - alto saxophone (tracks 1–4)
- Bill Holman - tenor saxophone, baritone saxophone (tracks 1–3, 5 & 6)
- Jack Montrose - tenor saxophone (tracks 1–3)
- Russ Freeman - piano
- Leroy Vinnegar (tracks 5 & 6), Monty Budwig (tracks 1–4) - bass
