= 2-3-4 =

Studio album by Shelly Manne
- Released: 1962
- Recorded: February 5 & 8, 1962
- Genre: Jazz
- Length: 41:38
- Label: Impulse!
- Producer: Bob Thiele

Shelly Manne chronology
Sounds Unheard Of! (1962)	2-3-4 (1962)	Empathy (1962)

Professional ratings
Review scores
Source	Rating
DownBeat	5/5 stars
AllMusic	4/5 stars
The Guardian	3/4 stars

2-3-4 is an album by American jazz drummer Shelly Manne featuring performances recorded in 1962 for the Impulse! label.

== Background ==
2-3-4 was not a typical album for Manne. Primarily associated with West Coast jazz, he flew from Los Angeles to New York City on February 5, 1962, by arrangement with producer Bob Thiele, to be reunited with pioneering tenor saxophonist Coleman Hawkins and pianist Hank Jones, with both of whom he had recorded at different times in the 1940s. In an unusual session lasting through the wee hours of the morning, he ended by recording one tune as a duet with Hawkins, who for the first time in his career was recorded also playing the piano.

The album includes a second recording session at the same studio a few days later. Bassist George Duvivier stayed on with Manne, and they were joined by Eddie Costa for two trio tracks. "The Sicks of Us" has Costa on vibes for "a largely spontaneous trio number"; on "Lean on Me", Costa switches to piano.

The name of the album is derived from its inclusion of a duet ("2"), two trio performances ("3"), and three tunes played by a quartet ("4"). Unusually, the standards "Take the "A" Train" and "Cherokee" were played in two tempos simultaneously, with Manne playing in double time consistently throughout "Cherokee".

A fourth tune recorded by the quartet at the first session, "Avalon", was released at first only in the Impulse! collection The Definitive Jazz Scene, Volume 1. Some thirty years later, it was included on the first CD reissue of 2-3-4 as a bonus track.

== Reception ==
The AllMusic review by Scott Yanow described the album as "a very interesting set with more than its share of surprises".

== Track listing ==
No.	Title	Writer(s)	Length
1.	"Take the "A" Train"	Billy Strayhorn	7:34
2.	"The Sicks of Us"	Eddie Costa, George Duvivier, Shelly Manne	6:00
3.	"Slowly"	Kermit Goell, David Raksin	5:34
4.	"Lean on Me"	Allan Greene, Edwin Waldman	6:28
5.	"Cherokee"	Ray Noble	3:29
6.	"Me and Some Drums"	Coleman Hawkins, Manne	5:59
7.	"Lean on Me" (Alternate take; Bonus track on CD reissue)	Greene, Waldman	6:24
8.	"Avalon" (Bonus track on CD reissue)	Al Jolson, Buddy DeSylva, Vincent Rose	6:34

- Recorded by George Piros at Fine Recording Ballroom Studio A in New York City on February 5 (tracks 1, 3, 5, 6 & 8), and February 8 (tracks 2, 4 & 7), 1962

Note that tracks 7 & 8 do not appear on the same CD reissues.

== Personnel ==
- Coleman Hawkins – tenor saxophone (tracks 1, 3, 5, 6 & 8), piano (track 6)
- Hank Jones – piano (tracks 1, 3, 5 & 8)
- Eddie Costa – piano, vibes (tracks 2, 4 & 7)
- George Duvivier – bass (tracks 1–5, 7 & 8)
- Shelly Manne – drums
