= Shelly Manne & His Men Play Checkmate =

Studio album by Shelly Manne & His Men
- Released: 1962
- Recorded: October 17 & 24, 1961
- Studio: Contemporary Records Studio (Los Angeles, California)
- Genre: Jazz
- Length: 43:49
- Label: Contemporary M3599/S7599
- Producer: Lester Koenig

Shelly Manne chronology
Live! Shelly Manne & His Men at the Manne-Hole (1961)	Shelly Manne & His Men Play Checkmate (1962)	Sounds Unheard Of! (1962)

Shelly Manne & His Men Play Checkmate (full title Shelly Manne & His Men Play the Music of John Williams from the TV Series Checkmate) is an album by drummer Shelly Manne's group Shelly Manne & His Men performing John Williams' score from the TV show Checkmate, recorded in 1961 and released on the Contemporary label.

== Reception ==
Professional ratings
Review scores
Source	Rating
AllMusic	3/5 stars
The Rolling Stone Jazz Record Guide	2/5 stars
The Penguin Guide to Jazz	3/4 stars

The AllMusic review by Scott Yanow states: "None of the melodies caught on but at least they gave these fine musicians some fresh material to improvise on. However, this album is not essential despite some strong solos". The Penguin Guide to Jazz called it "nothing too memorable; just a very competent and thoroughly enjoyable jazz disc."

== Track listing ==
All compositions by John Williams

1. "Checkmate" - 8:04
2. "The Isolated Pawn" - 6:10
3. "Cyanide Touch" - 7:46
4. "The King Swings" - 5:34
5. "En Passant" - 5:46
6. "Fireside Eyes" - 3:52
7. "The Black Knight" - 6:37

== Personnel ==
- Shelly Manne - drums
- Conte Candoli - trumpet
- Richie Kamuca - tenor saxophone
- Russ Freeman - piano
- Chuck Berghofer - bass
