= Shelly Manne & His Men Play Peter Gunn =

Studio album by Shelly Manne & His Men
- Released: 1959
- Recorded: January 19 & 20, 1959
- Studio: Contemporary Records Studio, Los Angeles, California
- Genre: Jazz
- Length: 41:42
- Label: Contemporary; M3560/S7560
- Producer: Lester Koenig

Shelly Manne chronology
Bells Are Ringing (1958)	Shelly Manne & His Men Play Peter Gunn (1959)	Son of Gunn!! (1959)

Shelly Manne & His Men Play Peter Gunn is an album by drummer Shelly Manne's group Shelly Manne & His Men performing Henry Mancini's score from the TV show Peter Gunn. It was recorded in 1959 and released on the Contemporary label.

== Reception ==
Professional ratings
Review scores
Source	Rating
AllMusic	2.5/5 stars
The Penguin Guide to Jazz Recordings	3/4 stars

The AllMusic review by Scott Yanow states: "Mancini encouraged Manne to use the songs as vehicles for extended solos, and the results are swinging, standing apart from the show. Candoli and particularly Geller are in top form on this fairly memorable effort".

== Track listing ==
All compositions by Henry Mancini

1. "Peter Gunn" - 2:12
2. "The Floater" - 4:29
3. "Sorta Blue" - 4:10
4. "The Brothers" - 4:24
5. "Soft Sounds" - 4:16
6. "Fallout" - 4:34
7. "Slow and Easy" - 5:56
8. "Brief and Breezy" - 4:03
9. "Dreamsville" - 3:50
10. "A Profound Gass" - 3:48

== Personnel ==
- Shelly Manne - drums
- Conte Candoli - trumpet
- Herb Geller - alto saxophone
- Victor Feldman - vibraphone, marimba
- Russ Freeman - piano
- Monty Budwig - bass
- Henry Mancini - arranger
