= Hawthorne Nights =

Studio album by Zoot Sims
- Released: 1977
- Recorded: September 20 & 21, 1976
- Studio: RCA, Los Angeles, CA
- Genre: Jazz
- Length: 41:10
- Label: Pablo; 2310 783
- Producer: Norman Granz

Zoot Sims chronology
Soprano Sax (1976)	Hawthorne Nights (1977)	If I'm Lucky (1977)

Hawthorne Nights is an album by saxophonist Zoot Sims, recorded in 1976 and released by the Pablo label the following year.

== Reception ==
Professional ratings
Review scores
Source	Rating
AllMusic	4/5 stars
The Penguin Guide to Jazz Recordings	2.5/4 stars

AllMusic reviewer Scott Yanow stated that "not a quartet outing but an opportunity for his tenor to be showcased while joined by a nine-piece group that includes six horns (three reeds among them). Bill Holman's inventive arrangements are a large part as to why the date is successful but Sims's playing on the five standards, two Holman pieces and his own 'Dark Cloud' should not be overlooked. Fortunately there is also some solo space saved for the talented sidemen... A well-rounded set of swinging jazz".

== Track listing ==
1. "Hawthorne Nights" (Bill Holman) – 4:39
2. "Main Stem" (Duke Ellington) – 5:00
3. "More Than You Know" (Vincent Youmans, Billy Rose, Edward Eliscu) – 5:57
4. "Only a Rose" (Rudolf Friml, Brian Hooker) – 5:06
5. "The Girl from Ipanema" (Antônio Carlos Jobim, Vinicius de Moraes, Norman Gimbel) – 4:10
6. "I Got It Bad and That Ain't Good" (Ellington, Paul Francis Webster) – 6:15
7. "Fillings" (Holman) – 5:22
8. "Dark Cloud" (Zoot Sims, Jon Hendricks) – 4:21

== Personnel ==
- Zoot Sims – tenor saxophone
- Oscar Brashear – trumpet
- Snooky Young – trumpet, flugelhorn
- Frank Rosolino – trombone
- Richie Kamuca – clarinet, tenor saxophone
- Jerome Richardson – clarinet, tenor saxophone, soprano saxophone, alto saxophone
- Bill Hood – baritone saxophone, bass clarinet, flute
- Ross Tompkins – piano
- Monty Budwig – bass
- Nick Ceroli – drums
- Bill Holman – arranger, conductor
