= Portrait of Shorty =

Studio album by Shorty Rogers and His Giants
- Released: 1958
- Recorded: July 15 and August 11, 1957; Los Angeles, CA
- Genre: Jazz
- Length: 41:07
- Label: RCA Victor; LPM 1561

Shorty Rogers chronology
Shorty Rogers Plays Richard Rodgers (1957)	Portrait of Shorty (1958)	St. Louis Blues (1958)

Portrait of Shorty is an album by American jazz trumpeter composer and arranger Shorty Rogers which was released on the RCA Victor label in 1958.

== Reception ==
Professional ratings
Review scores
Source	Rating
Allmusic	3/5 stars
The Penguin Guide to Jazz Recordings	3/4 stars

Allmusic awarded the album 3 stars. On All About Jazz Jack Bowers stated "there’s plenty of cleverly contoured music to appreciate. And it must be said that no other trumpeter ever sounded exactly like Shorty, who had a lively and swinging language all his own. His voicings for the trumpet section were similarly unexampled, and made any Rogers arrangement almost immediately identifiable. ...everything works, thanks to Shorty’s remarkable charts and the uncanny ability of his colleagues to speak volumes in only a few phrases".

The tune "Play, Boy" was written especially for and first appeared on a two-record (LP) set issued in 1957 by Playboy Magazine honoring the winners of the magazine's first Jazz Poll. Shorty Rogers had placed fourth in the trumpet voting.

== Track listing ==
All compositions by Shorty Rogers.

1. "Saturnian Sleigh Ride" - 3:48
2. "Martians Lullaby" - 7:13
3. "The Line Backer" - 4:11
4. "Grand Slam" - 4:57
5. "Play! Boy" - 5:43
6. "A Geophysical Ear" - 3:46
7. "Red Dog Play" - 4:49
8. "Bluezies" - 6:40
- Recorded in Los Angeles, CA on July 15, 1957, (tracks 1, 3, 5 & 6) and August 11, 1957 (tracks 2, 4, 7 & 8)

== Personnel ==
- Shorty Rogers - trumpet, flugelhorn, arranger
- Conte Candoli, Pete Candoli, Don Fagerquist, Conrad Gozzo, Al Porcino - trumpet
- Harry Betts, Frank Rosolino - trombone
- Bob Enevoldsen - valve trombone
- George Roberts - bass trombone
- Herb Geller - alto saxophone, tenor saxophone
- Bill Holman, Richie Kamuca, Jack Montrose - tenor saxophone
- Pepper Adams - baritone saxophone
- Lou Levy - piano
- Monty Budwig - bass
- Stan Levey - drums
