= Monty Budwig =

American jazz double bassist (1929–1992)

- Born: Monte Rex Budwig; December 26, 1929; Pender, Nebraska, United States
- Died: March 9, 1992 (aged 62) Eagle Rock, Los Angeles, California
- Genres: Jazz
- Occupation: Musician
- Instrument: Double bass

Monte Rex Budwig (December 26, 1929 – March 9, 1992) was a West Coast jazz double bassist, professionally known as Monty Budwig.

== Early life ==
Monte Rex Budwig was born in Pender, Nebraska, on December 26, 1929. His parents were musical. He began playing bass during high school, and continued in military bands while he was enlisted in the Air Force for three years.

== Later life and career ==
In 1954, Budwig moved to Los Angeles and performed and recorded under the name Monty Budwig with jazz musicians including Carmen McRae, Barney Kessel, Woody Herman, Red Norvo, and Shelly Manne. Budwig played with pianist Vince Guaraldi in the 1960s, including on the pianist's album Jazz Impressions of Black Orpheus. Budwig was part of Benny Goodman's band for performances in New York, and a tour of Japan in 1964. He also began his career as a studio musician in the 1960s, which encompassed film and television shows, with Steve Allen, Johnny Carson, Merv Griffin and Judy Garland. Budwig taught jazz bassist Scott Colley, then a teenager.

Budwig toured Australia with Goodman in 1973. He made another international tour in 1974, this time to South America with Carmen McRae. His one recording as a leader was Dig, for Concord Records.

== Death ==
Budwig died of liver cancer at home in Eagle Rock, Los Angeles, on March 9, 1992. He had a son, Darin, with his first wife. He married his second wife, Arlette McCoy, in 1977. His stepson, Dean McCoy, is a teacher and drummer. Arlette McCoy Budwig, a jazz pianist and teacher, died in 2013.

== Discography ==
=== As leader ===
- Dig (Dobre Records DR1057, 1978)

=== As sideman ===
With Toshiko Akiyoshi

- Finesse (Concord, 1978)

With Chet Baker and Bud Shank

- Theme Music from "The James Dean Story" (World Pacific, 1956)

With Gary Burton

- 3 in Jazz (RCA, 1963)

With Herb Alpert

- Midnight Sun (A&M 1992)

With Frank Butler

- The Stepper (Xanadu, 1977)
- Wheelin' and Dealin' (Xanadu, 1978)

With Conte Candoli

- Conte Candoli Quartet (Mode, 1957)
- Sweet Simon (Best Recordings 1992)

With Betty Carter

- 'Round Midnight (Atco, 1963)

With June Christy

- Do-Re-Mi (Capitol, 1961) – with Bob Cooper

With Rosemary Clooney

- Everything's Coming Up Rosie (Concord, 1977)
- Rosie Sings Bing (Concord, 1978)
- Here's to My Lady (Concord, 1978)

With Bob Cooper (musician)

- For All We Know (Fresh Sound 1991)

With Sonny Criss

- I'll Catch the Sun! (Prestige, 1969)

With Herb Ellis

- Soft & Mellow (Concord, 1979)

With Bill Evans

- Empathy (Verve, 1962) – with Shelly Manne

With Stan Getz

- The Dolphin (Concord Jazz, 1981)
- Spring Is Here (Concord Jazz, 1981 [1992])

With Vince Guaraldi

- Jazz Impressions of Black Orpheus (Fantasy, 1962)
- Jazz Impressions of A Boy Named Charlie Brown (Fantasy, 1964)
- From All Sides (Fantasy, 1964) – with Bola Sete
- A Charlie Brown Christmas (Fantasy, 1965)
- It's the Great Pumpkin, Charlie Brown (Craft Recordings, 1966)
- It Was a Short Summer, Charlie Brown (Lee Mendelson Film Productions, 1969)

With Richie Kamuca and Bill Holman

- Jazz Erotica (West Coast Jazz in Hifi) (Fantasy 1959)

With Stan Kenton

- Stan Kenton Plays for Today (Capitol, 1966)
- The World We Know (Capitol, 1967)

With Barney Kessel

- Kessel Plays Standards (Contemporary, 1954)
- Some Like It Hot (Contemporary, 1959)

With Jimmy Knepper

- Jimmy Knepper in L.A. (Discomate, 1977)

With Stan Levey

- Stan Levey Quintet (Vap 1957)

With Julie London

- All Through the Night: Julie London Sings the Choicest of Cole Porter (Liberty, 1965)

With Junior Mance

- Straight Ahead! (Capitol, 1964)

With Shelly Manne

- Concerto for Clarinet & Combo (Contemporary, 1957)
- The Gambit (Contemporary, 1958)
- Shelly Manne & His Men Play Peter Gunn (Contemporary, 1959)
- Son of Gunn!! (Contemporary, 1959)
- At the Black Hawk 1 (Contemporary, 1959)
- At the Black Hawk 2 (Contemporary, 1959)
- At the Black Hawk 3 (Contemporary, 1959)
- At the Black Hawk 4 (Contemporary, 1959)
- At the Black Hawk 5 (Contemporary, 1959 [1991])
- My Son the Jazz Drummer! (Contemporary, 1962)
- My Fair Lady with the Un-original Cast (Capitol, 1964)
- Manne–That's Gershwin! (Capitol, 1965)
- Boss Sounds! (Atlantic, 1966)
- Jazz Gunn (Atlantic, 1967)
- Perk Up (Concord Jazz, 1967 [1976])

With Charles McPherson

- Free Bop! (Xanadu, 1978)

With Lennie Niehaus

- The Octet # 2 Vol. 3 (Contemporary 1991)

With Joe Pass

- Live at Yoshi's (Pablo, 1992)
- Nuages (Live at Yoshi's, vol. 2) (Pablo, 1997)

With Art Pepper

- Surf Ride (Savoy, 1952-1954 [1956])

With Spike Robinson

- Reminiscin (Dedicated to Monty Budwig) (Capri 1992)

With Spike Robinson and Harry "Sweets" Edison

- Jusa Bit 'O' Blues (Capri 1989)
- Jusa Bit 'O' Blues Vol. 2 (Capri 1990)

With Shorty Rogers

- Portrait of Shorty (RCA Victor, 1957)

With Bola Sete

- The Incomparable Bola Sete (Fantasy, 1964)

With Bud Shank

- California Concert (Contemporary, 1985) with Shorty Rogers

With Zoot Sims

- Hawthorne Nights (Pablo, 1977)
- On The Korner (Pablo 1994)

With Ira Sullivan

- Multimedia (Galaxy Music, 1978 [1982])

With Supersax

- Supersax & L.A. Voices - The Complete Edition (CBS 1990)

With Cal Tjader

- Breathe Easy (Galaxy, 1977)

With Sarah Vaughan

- Sarah Vaughan with the Jimmy Rowles Quintet (Mainstream, 1974)
