= Daktari (album) =

Studio album by Shelly Manne
- Released: 1967
- Recorded: November 30 and December 4 & 5, 1967
- Studio: Annex Recording Studios, Hollywood, CA
- Genre: Jazz
- Length: 32:03
- Label: Atlantic SD 8157
- Producer: Nesuhi Ertegun

Shelly Manne chronology
Perk Up (1967)	Daktari (1967)	Young Billy Young (1967)

Daktari (subtitled Shelly Manne Performs & Conducts His Original Music for the Hit TV Show) is an album by drummer Shelly Manne recorded in 1967 featuring music from Daktari and released on the Atlantic label. On the album, Mike Wofford plays a tack piano to evoke an African sound, and Manne is joined by percussionists Emil Richards, Larry Bunker, Frank Carlson, and Victor Feldman. According to the liner notes, Manne and fellow percussionists play ankle and wrist jingles, Thai mouth organs, angklungs, ocarinas, vibraphones, tympani, and different kinds of marimbas.

== Reception ==
Professional ratings
Review scores
Source	Rating
AllMusic	2/5 stars
The Penguin Guide to Jazz Recordings	3/4 stars

Steely Dan guitarist Walter Becker was a fan of the album's "vaguely African" music, sounding like it came from "Hollywood session players" rather than actual Africans. In the late 1990s, Becker modeled a percussion sequence after this style on the song "Two Against Nature" released on the Steely Dan album of the same name.

== Track listing ==
All compositions by Shelly Manne

1. "Daktari" - 2:14
2. "Out on a Limb" - 3:04
3. "Clarence" - 2:18
4. "Africa" - 3:10
5. "Stay With Me" - 2:46
6. "Elephantime" - 2:21
7. "Wameru" - 2:56
8. "Toto" - 2:44
9. "Galloping Giraffes" - 3:11
10. "Judy Judy" - 2:37
11. "Ivan" - 2:27
12. "Rhino Trot" - 1:51

== Personnel ==
- Shelly Manne – drums, percussion
- Justin Gordon, Bud Shank, Arthur C. Smith, Frank Strozier – woodwinds
- Mike Wofford – piano
- Bob Bain – guitar
- Bill Pitman – bass
- Larry Bunker, Frank Carlsson, Victor Feldman, Emil Richards – percussion
- Richard Hazard – arranger
