= Supersax =

American jazz band

- Genre: Jazz
- Years active: 1972–1988
- Labels: Capitol, MPS, Columbia
- Past members: Fred Atwood; Mike Barone; Ronnell Bright; Monty Budwig; Conte Candoli; Buddy Clark; John Dentz; Med Flory; Jake Hanna; Bill Hood (baritone sax and arranger); Lou Levy; Charles Loper; Joe Lopes; Lawrence Marable; Warne Marsh; Larry McGuire; Don Menza; Jay Migliori; Blue Mitchell; Lanny Morgan; Jack Nimitz; Ralph Osborne; Ray Reed; Frank Rosolino; Ernie Tack; Ray Triscari; Gene Merlino (L.A. Voices); Sue Raney (L.A. Voices)

Supersax was an American jazz group, created in 1972 by saxophonist Med Flory and bassist Buddy Clark as a tribute to saxophonist Charlie Parker. The group's music consisted of harmonized arrangements of Parker's improvisations played by a saxophone section (two altos, two tenors, and a baritone), rhythm section (bass, piano, drums), and a brass instrument (trombone or trumpet).

== History ==
Notable brass soloists that recorded with the group included Conte Candoli (trumpet), Frank Rosolino (trombone) and Carl Fontana (trombone). On the group's recordings their music was tightly orchestrated, with arrangements by Flory that contained little or no calls for improvisation (although members of the band would often solo at live performances).

Saxophonist Warne Marsh was a member in the first edition of the group, and although he was never given freedom to solo on any officially released materials, Lee Konitz has stated that there are bootleg tapes of the group where Warne played a solo.

They won the Grammy Award for Best Jazz Performance by a Group in 1974. They were also part of the Grammy-nominated 1983 recording Supersax & L.A. Voices, Volume 1, in which the L.A. Voices were nominated for Best Jazz Vocal Performance - Duo Or Group. Med Flory also wrote the vocal arrangements for the L.A. Voices recordings, as well as sang bass.

== Discography ==
- Supersax Plays Bird (Capitol, 1973)
- Salt Peanuts: Supersax Plays Bird Vol. 2 (Capitol, 1974)
- Supersax Plays Bird with Strings (Capitol, 1975)
- Chasin' the Bird (MPS, 1977)
- Dynamite!! (MPS, 1979)
- Supersax & L.A. Voices: L.A. (Columbia, 1983)
- Supersax & L.A. Voices Vol. 2 (CBS, 1984)
- Supersax & L.A. Voices Vol. 3: Straighten Up and Fly Right (CBS, 1986)
- Stone Bird (Columbia, 1988)
- Live in '75: The Japanese Tour (Hindsight, 1998)
- Live in '75: The Japanese Tour Vol. 2 (Hindsight, 1999)
