= Manne–That's Gershwin! =

Studio album by Shelly Manne Quintet and Big Band
- Released: 1965
- Recorded: February 24, 25 & 26, 1965
- Studio: Capitol (Hollywood)
- Genre: Jazz
- Length: 43:36
- Label: Capitol T/ST 2313
- Producer: Dave Cavanaugh

Shelly Manne chronology
My Fair Lady with the Un-original Cast (1964)	Manne–That's Gershwin! (1965)	Sounds! (1966)

Manne–That's Gershwin! is an album by drummer Shelly Manne featuring music by George Gershwin, recorded in 1965 and released on the Capitol label.

== Reception ==
Professional ratings
Review scores
Source	Rating
AllMusic	2.5/5 stars
Record Mirror	3/5 stars

The AllMusic reviewer Scott Yanow stated: "Although not all that memorable, this music generally swings, leaves space for concise solos and is fairly fresh".

== Track listing ==
All compositions by George and Ira Gershwin, except as indicated

1. "By Strauss" - 2:53
2. "My Man's Gone Now" (George Gershwin, DuBose Heyward) - 3:30
3. "Mine" - 3:55
4. "Love Is Here to Stay" - 2:31
5. "Summertime" (Gershwin, Heyward) - 3:55
6. "The Real American Folk Song (is a Rag)" - 2:45
7. "The Man I Love" - 5:23
8. "Prelude #2" (George Gershwin) - 2:37
9. "How Long Has This Been Going On?" - 2:33
10. "Theme from Concerto in F" (George Gershwin) - 2:55

== Personnel ==
- Shelly Manne - drums
- Conte Candoli, Lee Katzman, Larry McGuire, Al Porcino, Ray Triscari, Stu Williamson, Jimmy Zito - trumpet
- Bob Edmondson, Frank Rosolino, Mike Barone - trombone
- Richard Perissi, Vincent DeRosa - French horn
- John Bambridge - tuba
- Frank Strozier - alto saxophone
- Jack Nimitz, Justin Gordon, Bud Shank - woodwinds
- Russ Freeman - piano
- Monty Budwig - bass
- John Williams - musical director
