= Bells Are Ringing (album) =

Studio album by Shelly Manne, André Previn and Red Mitchell
- Released: 1959
- Recorded: April 15 and July 26, 1958; Contemporary Records Studio, Los Angeles, California
- Genre: Jazz
- Length: 43:27
- Label: Contemporary M3559/S7559
- Producer: Lester Koenig

Shelly Manne chronology
The Gambit (1958)	Bells Are Ringing (1959)	Shelly Manne & His Men Play Peter Gunn (1959)

Bells Are Ringing (full title Modern Jazz Performances of Songs from Bells Are Ringing) is an album by drummer Shelly Manne's group Shelly Manne & His Friends, with pianist André Previn and bassist Red Mitchell. It was recorded in 1958 and released on the Contemporary label. The album features Manne's jazz interpretations of songs from Jule Styne, Betty Comden, and Adolph Green's broadway musical, Bells Are Ringing and followed the success of Manne's 1956 album, My Fair Lady. The album appeared a year prior to the release of the motion picture.

== Reception ==
Professional ratings
Review scores
Source	Rating
AllMusic	3/5 stars
The Penguin Guide to Jazz Recordings	3/4 stars

The AllMusic review by Scott Yanow states: "As is always the case with this group, Previn's piano is the lead voice and his virtuosity, good taste, melodic improvising, and solid sense of swing are chiefly responsible for the music's success".

== Track listing ==
All compositions by Jule Styne, Betty Comden and Adolph Green

1. "I Met a Girl" - 3:20
2. "Just in Time" - 3:36
3. "The Party's Over" [Ballad Version] - 5:15
4. "It's a Perfect Relationship" - 5:48
5. "Is It a Crime?" - 3:46
6. "I Better Think of Her" - 3:08
7. "Independent (On My Own)" - 5:58
8. "Muchacha" - 4:26
9. "Long Before I Knew You" - 4:11
10. "The Party's Over" [Up Tempo Version] - 3:59

== Personnel ==
- Shelly Manne - drums
- André Previn - piano
- Red Mitchell - bass
