= Jack Marshall (composer) =

American jazz guitarist (1921–1973)

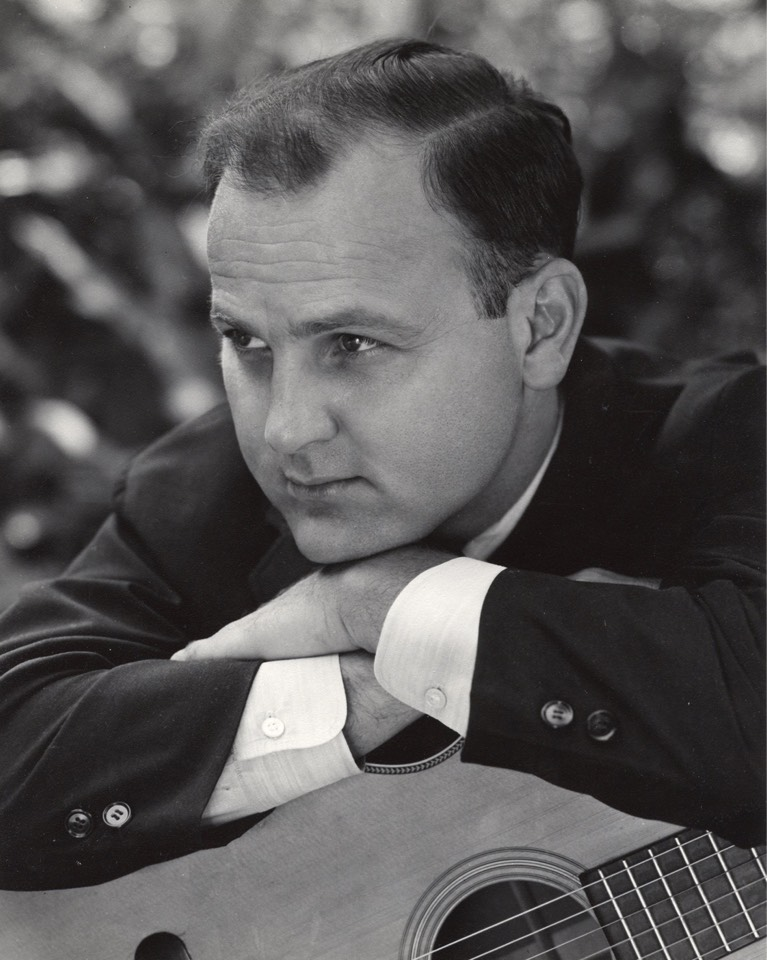

Background information
- Born: Jack Wilton Marshall; November 23, 1921; El Dorado, Kansas, U.S.
- Died: September 20, 1973 (aged 51) Newport Beach, California, U.S.
- Genres: Jazz
- Occupations: Musician, composer, record producer
- Instrument: Guitar
- Labels: Capitol

Jack Wilton Marshall (November 23, 1921 – September 20, 1973) was an American jazz guitarist, composer, arranger, and record producer. He was married to Eva Katherine Pellegrini, and the father to four children: three sons, producer/director Frank Marshall, composer/arranger Phil Marshall, bassist Matt Marshall, and a daughter, Sally Marshall. Jack is also the cousin of classical guitarist Christopher Parkening.

== Biography ==
Born in El Dorado, Kansas, Marshall was one of Capitol Records' top producers in the late 1950s and 1960s. He had a varied career as a jazz, rock and classical guitarist and also as a composer, arranger and record producer. He released two solo albums with drummer Shelly Manne that featured his fingerstyle jazz guitar playing. He was a friend of Howard Roberts and Jack Sheldon and produced several of their albums for Capitol. He wrote his own arrangements, many with a big-band sound to them. He was credited with the arrangement for Peggy Lee's "Fever", with Joe Mondragon on bass, Shelly Manne on drums, and Howard Roberts adding the iconic finger snaps. Marshall composed the theme and incidental music for the 1960s TV series The Munsters and the 1966 tie-in film Munster, Go Home! (the theme music was nominated for a Grammy Award in 1965). He also composed music for the movies The Missouri Traveler (1958), Thunder Road (1958), The Giant Gila Monster (1959) and Kona Coast (1968), as well as The Deputy, a 1959–1961 western television series starring Henry Fonda, and the television series The Investigators (1961), Don't Call Me Charlie! (1962–1963), and The Debbie Reynolds Show (1969–1970).

== Discography ==
=== Albums ===
- 18th Century Jazz (Capitol, 1959)
- Soundsville (Capitol, 1959)
- The Marshall Swings!!! (Capitol, 1960)
- Sounds Unheard Of! with Shelly Manne (Contemporary, 1962)
- My Son the Surf Nut (Capitol, 1963)
- Tuff Jack (Capitol, 1963)
- Happy, Youthful Sounds of The Guitar Ramblers (Columbia, 1963)
- At Home with The Munsters (Golden Records, 1964)
- Sounds! with Shelly Manne (Capitol, 1966)
- Quiet Nights & Brazilian Nights (Capitol, 1966)
- Freaky Friday: The Jazz Opera (Butterfly, 2006)
- Thunder Road: The Film Music of Jack Marshall (La-La Land, 2017)
- Munster, Go Home (Original Motion Picture Soundtrack) (La-La Land, 2020)
- The Munsters / Television Music Of Jack Marshall: With The Deputy, Wagon Train, The Virginian (La-La Land, 2023)

=== As arranger, conductor ===
- Peggy Lee Things Are Swingin' (Capitol, 1959)
- Peggy Lee I Like Men! (Capitol, 1959)
- The Four Freshmen The Four Freshmen and Five Guitars (Capitol, 1959)
- Peggy Lee Latin ala Lee (Capitol, 1960)
- Judy Garland That's Entertainment! (Capitol, 1960)
- Jack Sheldon Out! (Capitol, 1962)
- Howard Roberts H.R. is A Dirty Guitar Player (Capitol, 1963)
- Blossom Dearie May I Come In? (Capitol, 1964)
- Wanda De Sah Softly (Capitol, 1965)
- Howard Roberts Somethings Cookin' (Capitol, 1965)
- Howard Roberts Guilty!! (Capitol, 1967)

=== As sideman (guitar) ===
- MGM Studio Orchestra, An American in Paris, MGM Jubilee Overture, High Society, Raintree County (MGM, 1951–1957)
- Benny Carter, The Urbane Mr. Carter (Norgran, 1954)
- Harry James, Soft Lights Sweet Trumpet (Columbia, 1954)
- Milt Bernhart, Modern Brass (RCA Victor, 1955)
- Dominic Frontiere, Dom Frontiere Sextet (Liberty, 1955)
- Shorty Rogers, Andre Previn, Collaboration (RCA Victor, 1955)
- Jack Teagarden, This Is Teagarden! (Capitol, 1956)
- Dominic Frontiere, Fabulous (Liberty, 1956)
- Louis Prima, The Call of the Wildest (Capitol, 1957)
- The Four Freshmen, 4 Freshmen and 5 Trumpets (Capitol, 1957)
- Rusty Bryant, Rusty Bryant Plays Jazz (Dot, 1958)
- Glen Gray, Sounds of the Great Bands (Capitol, 1958)
- Barney Kessel, Some Like It Hot (Contemporary, 1959)
- Verlye Mills, Billy May, Harp with a Beat (HiFi, 1959)
- Nancy Wilson, Something Wonderful (Capitol, 1960)
- Glen Gray, Please Mr. Gray (Capitol, 1961)
- Marian Montgomery, Let There Be Love, Let There Be Swing, Let There Be (Capitol, 1961)
- Jack Sheldon, Out! (Capitol, 1962)
- Jonah Jones, Glen Gray, Jonah Jones Quartet/Glen Gray Casa Loma Orchestra (Capitol, 1962)
- Judy Henske, High Flying Bird (Elektra, 1963)
- Jody Miller, Wednesday's Child Is Full of Woe (Capitol, 1963)
- Laurindo Almeida, Girl from Ipanema (Capitol, 1964)
- Howard Roberts, Guilty!! (Capitol, 1967)
- Chet Baker, Jack Sheldon, In Perfect Harmony: The Lost Album (Jazz Detective, 2024)

== Bibliography ==
- Marshall, Jack; Almeida, Laurindo; Heitmeyer, Howard; Hendrickson, Al; Kessel, Barney; Pitman, Bill; Bain, Bob; Roberts, Howard (1961). West Coast Guitar: Eight Original Solos for Guitar. New York: Leeds Music Corporation. ASIN B0080YPG16.
- Marshall, Jack (1985). Authentic Brazilian Bossa Nova Guitar Arrangements. Hal Leonard Corporation. ISBN 978-0793505142.
