= Sounds Unheard Of! =

Studio album by Shelly Manne and Jack Marshall
- Released: 1962
- Recorded: Early 1962
- Studio: Contemporary Records Studio, Los Angeles, California
- Genre: Jazz
- Label: Contemporary M5006/S6006
- Producer: Lester Koenig

Shelly Manne chronology
Shelly Manne & His Men Play Checkmate (1961)	Sounds Unheard Of! (1962)	2-3-4 (1962)

Sounds Unheard Of! (subtitled Percussion & Guitar!! Shelly Manne!! and Jack Marshall!!! In a Spectacular Demonstration of Musical Daring and Brilliant New Stereo!!) is an album by drummer Shelly Manne and guitarist Jack Marshall recorded in early 1962 and released on the Contemporary label. The album was produced as a stereo test and demonstration record to be used by hi-fi enthusiasts to test the performance of their audio systems. The two men followed this with another release in 1966 on the Capitol label titled Sounds!.

== Reception ==
Professional ratings
Review scores
Source	Rating
AllMusic	1.5/5 stars

The AllMusic review by Scott Yanow states: "On a dozen standards, Marshall's playing serves as interludes between the percussion displays of Manne; the liners give a full description of every device he hits. The music is fairly routine even if the sound is excellent for the period".

== Track listing ==
1. "Poinciana" (Nat Simon, Buddy Bernier) - 3:10
2. "My Funny Valentine" (Richard Rodgers, Lorenz Hart) - 3:05
3. "The Continental" (Con Conrad, Herb Magidson) - 3:26
4. "By Myself" (Arthur Schwartz, Howard Dietz) - 2:19
5. "Stormy Weather" (Harold Arlen, Ted Koehler) - 2:54
6. "Begin the Beguine" (Cole Porter) - 3:35
7. "Night and Day" (Porter) - 3:09
8. "Makin' Whoopee" (Walter Donaldson, Gus Kahn) - 2:39
9. "The Piccolino" (Irving Berlin) - 3:11
10. "I'll Remember April" (Gene de Paul, Patricia Johnston, Don Raye) - 3:17
11. "The Boy Next Door" (Hugh Martin, Ralph Blane) - 2:42
12. "Temptation" (Nacio Herb Brown, Arthur Freed) - 3:12

== Personnel ==
- Shelly Manne - percussion
- Jack Marshall - classical guitar
