= Live! Shelly Manne & His Men at the Manne-Hole =

Live album by Shelly Manne & His Men
- Released: 1961
- Recorded: March 3, 4 & 5, 1961; Shelly's Manne-Hole in Hollywood, California
- Genre: Jazz
- Length: 77:13
- Label: Contemporary M 3593-4/S7593-4
- Producer: Lester Koenig

Shelly Manne chronology
Ruth Price with Shelly Manne & His Men at the Manne-Hole (1961)	Live! Shelly Manne & His Men at the Manne-Hole (1961)	Shelly Manne & His Men Play Checkmate (1961)

Live! Shelly Manne & His Men at the Manne-Hole is a live double-album by drummer Shelly Manne's group Shelly Manne & His Men, recorded at Shelly's Manne-Hole in Hollywood, California, in 1961 and released on the Contemporary label. The album was re-released on two separate CDs in 1991 as Volume 1 and Volume 2.

== Reception ==
Professional ratings
Review scores
Source	Rating
AllMusic	Vol. 1
AllMusic	Vol. 2
The Penguin Guide to Jazz Recordings	Vol. 1
The Penguin Guide to Jazz Recordings	Vol. 2

The AllMusic review by Scott Yanow states: "Shelly Manne & His Men are heard in prime form performing live at their home base, Shelly's Manne-Hole. Trumpeter Conte Candoli was in particularly strong form throughout the stint, showing self-restraint yet playing with power. ... This classic music falls between cool jazz and hard bop".

== Track listing ==
Volume 1

1. "Love for Sale" (Cole Porter) – 10:29
2. "How Could It Happen to a Dream?" (Duke Ellington, Johnny Hodges, Don George) – 6:50
3. "Softly, as in a Morning Sunrise" (Sigmund Romberg, Oscar Hammerstein II) – 8:59
4. "The Champ" (Dizzy Gillespie) – 10:55

Volume 2

1. "On Green Dolphin Street" (Bronisław Kaper, Ned Washington) – 13:00
2. "What's New?" (Bob Haggart, Johnny Burke) – 6:47
3. "If I Were a Bell" (Frank Loesser) – 12:17
4. "Ev'ry Time We Say Goodbye" (Porter) – 4:25
5. "A Gem from Tiffany" (Bill Holman) – 2:35

== Personnel ==
- Shelly Manne – drums
- Conte Candoli – trumpet
- Richie Kamuca – tenor saxophone
- Russ Freeman – piano
- Chuck Berghofer – bass
