= Conte Candoli =

American jazz trumpeter (1927–2001)

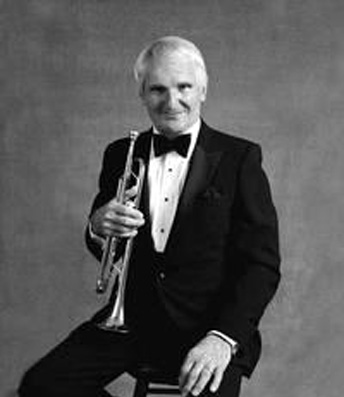

Background information
- Born: Secondo Candoli; July 12, 1927; Mishawaka, Indiana, U.S.
- Died: December 14, 2001 (aged 74) Palm Desert, California
- Genres: Jazz
- Occupation: Musician
- Instrument: Trumpet
- Years active: 1943–2001
- Formerly of: Candoli Brothers; The Tonight Show Band
- Website: www.candoli.com

Secondo "Conte" Candoli (July 12, 1927 – December 14, 2001) was an American jazz trumpeter based on the West Coast. He played in the big bands of Woody Herman, Stan Kenton, Benny Goodman, and Dizzy Gillespie, and in Doc Severinsen's NBC Orchestra on The Tonight Show Starring Johnny Carson. He played with Gerry Mulligan, and on Frank Sinatra's TV specials. He also recorded with Supersax, a Charlie Parker tribute band that consisted of a saxophone quintet, the rhythm section, and either a trumpet or trombone.

== Music career ==
Conte was the younger brother of trumpeter Pete Candoli. He was born in Mishawaka, Indiana, United States. During the summer of 1943, while at Mishawaka High School, Secondo "Conte" Candoli sat in with Woody Herman's First Herd.

After graduating in 1945, he joined the band full-time, where he sat side by side with his brother Pete in the trumpet section. Conte immediately went on the road, where he stayed for the next ten years, with Herman, Stan Kenton, Benny Goodman, and Dizzy Gillespie.

In 1954, after leaving Stan Kenton, Candoli formed his own group with sidemen Chubby Jackson, Frank Rosolino, and Lou Levy. He soon moved to Los Angeles to join the Lighthouse All-Stars with Shorty Rogers, Bud Shank, and Bob Cooper, and was with them for four years.

Candoli's long relationship with The Tonight Show began in 1967 and he became a permanent fixture in the orchestra's trumpet section, when Johnny Carson moved the show to Burbank, California in 1972. For many years he preferred to stay in California where he could do The Tonight Show, take all the studio work he wanted, and do occasional concerts and clinics. He ventured to Kansas in 1986 as a WJF All-Star with Jerome Richardson, Barney Kessel and Monty Alexander at the 1986 Wichita Jazz Festival. After Carson's retirement in 1992, he traveled occasionally with Doc Severinsen, but still enjoyed his solo playing.

His playing brought him performing and recording opportunities with top names in show business, such as Gerry Mulligan, Shelly Manne, Terry Gibbs, Teddy Edwards, Bing Crosby, Sammy Davis Jr., and Sarah Vaughan. He has appeared in many motion pictures with various orchestras and worked in all of Frank Sinatra's TV specials.

Candoli was inducted into The International Jazz Hall of Fame in 1997. He died of cancer at the age of 74, in Palm Desert, California,

== Band memberships ==
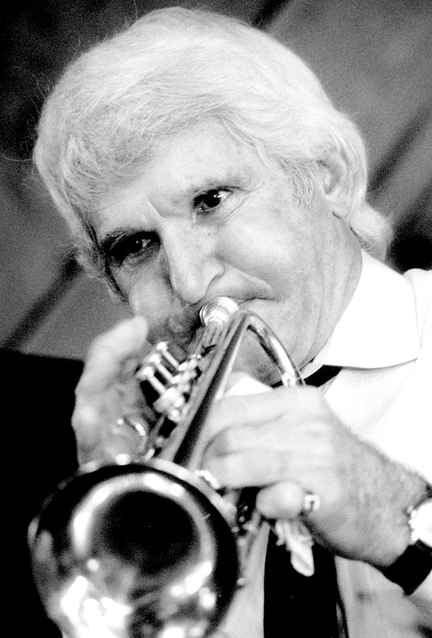
Candoli at Bach Dancing & Dynamite Society, Half Moon Bay, California, 1988

Band	Years
Woody Herman's First Herd	1943 Summer; 1945–
Chubby Jackson's Fifth Dimensional Jazz Group	
Stan Kenton	1948
Charlie Ventura's "Bop for the People"	1949
Stan Kenton	1951–1954
Terry Gibbs Dream Band	–
Gerry Mulligan's Concert Jazz Band	1960–1961
Howard Rumsey's Lighthouse All-Stars	1956–1960
Supersax	
The Tonight Show	1967–1972 Guest; 1972–1992 Regular
Candoli Brothers	1957–1962

== Discography ==
Album	Release
Sincerely, Conte Candoli	1954
Groovin' High: Conte Candoli, Vol. 2	1955
Toots Sweet and West Coast Wailers	1955
Groovin' Higher: Conte Candoli Quintet	1955
Cool Gabriels – Conte Candoli et alia	1956 (Groove LG-1033)
Conte Candoli Quartet	1957
Mucho Calor	1957
Little Band Big Jazz	1960
Conversation	1973
Candoli Brothers	1970s
Old Acquaintance	1985
Sweet Simon	1992
Meets the Joe Haider Trio	1994
Portrait of a Count	1966
Candoli Live	2002
The Complete Phoenix Recordings, Vol. 1	2002
Fine and Dandy	

=== As sideman ===
With Manny Albam and Ernie Wilkins

- The Drum Suite (RCA Victor, 1956)

With Chet Baker

- Chet Baker Big Band (Pacific Jazz, 1956)

With Louis Bellson

- Big Band Jazz from the Summit (Roulette, 1962)

With Elmer Bernstein

- The Man with the Golden Arm (Decca, 1956)

With Buddy Bregman

- Swinging Kicks (Verve, 1957)

With Bob Cooper

- Coop! The Music of Bob Cooper (Contemporary, 1958)

With Sonny Criss

- Sonny's Dream (Prestige, 1968)

With Teddy Edwards

- Feelin's (Muse, 1974)

with Victor Feldman

- Latinsville! (Contemporary, 1960)

With Maynard Ferguson

- Dimensions (EmArcy, 1955)
- Maynard Ferguson Octet (EmArcy, 1955)

With Clare Fischer

- Manteca! (Pacific Jazz, 1965)
- Thesaurus (Atlantic, 1969)

With Gil Fuller

- Night Flight (Pacific Jazz, 1965)

With Stan Getz

- West Coast Jazz (Norgran, 1955)

With Stan Levey

- This Time The Drum's On Me (Bethlehem, 1955)

With Dizzy Gillespie

- The New Continent (Limelight, 1962)

With Stan Kenton

- Popular Favorites by Stan Kenton (Capitol, 1953)
- Sketches on Standards (Capitol, 1953)
- This Modern World (Capitol, 1953)
- Portraits on Standards (Capitol, 1953)
- The Kenton Era (Capitol, 1940–54, [1955])
- Kenton / Wagner (Capitol, 1964)
- The Innovations Orchestra (Capitol, 1950–51 [1997])

With Shelly Manne

- Shelly Manne & His Men Play Peter Gunn (Contemporary, 1959)
- Ruth Price with Shelly Manne & His Men at the Manne-Hole (Contemporary, 1961) with Ruth Price
- Live! Shelly Manne & His Men at the Manne-Hole (Contemporary, 1961)
- Shelly Manne & His Men Play Checkmate (Contemporary, 1961)
- My Fair Lady with the Un-original Cast (Capitol, 1964)
- Manne–That's Gershwin! (Capitol, 1965)
- Boss Sounds! (Atlantic, 1966)
- Jazz Gunn (Atlantic, 1967)
- Perk Up (Concord Jazz, 1967 [1976])

With Jack Montrose

- Jack Montrose Sextet (Pacific Jazz, 1955)

With Mark Murphy

- This Could Be the Start of Something (Capitol, 1958)
- Mark Murphy's Hip Parade (Capitol 1959)
- Playing the Field (Capitol, 1960)

With Frank Morgan

- Frank Morgan (Gene Norman Presents, 1955)

With Gerry Mulligan

- The Concert Jazz Band (Verve, 1960)
- Gerry Mulligan and the Concert Jazz Band on Tour (Verve, 1960 [1962])

With Joe Newman

- Salute to Satch (RCA Victor, 1956)

With Jack Nitzsche

- Heart Beat (Soundtrack) (Capitol, 1980)

With Anita O'Day

- Cool Heat (Verve, 1959)

With Art Pepper

- Gettin' Together (Contemporary 1958)

With Betty Roché

- Take the "A" Train (Bethlehem, 1956)

With Shorty Rogers

- Martians Come Back! (Atlantic, 1955 [1956])
- Way Up There (Atlantic, 1955 [1957])
- Shorty Rogers Plays Richard Rodgers (RCA Victor, 1957)
- Portrait of Shorty (RCA Victor, 1957)
- Chances Are It Swings (RCA Victor, 1958)
- The Swingin' Nutcracker (RCA Victor, 1960)
- An Invisible Orchard (RCA Victor, 1961 [1997])

With Pete Rugolo

- Ten Trumpets and 2 Guitars (Mercury, 1961)

With Bud Shank

- Windmills of Your Mind (Pacific Jazz, 1969)

With Lalo Schifrin

- Jazz Suite on the Mass Texts (RCA Victor, 1965) with Paul Horn
- More Mission: Impossible (Paramount, 1968)
- Mannix (Paramount, 1968)

With Gerald Wilson

- The Golden Sword (Pacific Jazz, 1966)

With Pete Candoli

- The Candoli Brothers (Dobre Records DR1050, 1978)

With The Gene Harris All Star Big Band

- Tribute to Count Basie (Concord Jazz, 1988)
