= Frank Rosolino =

American jazz trombonist (1926–1978)

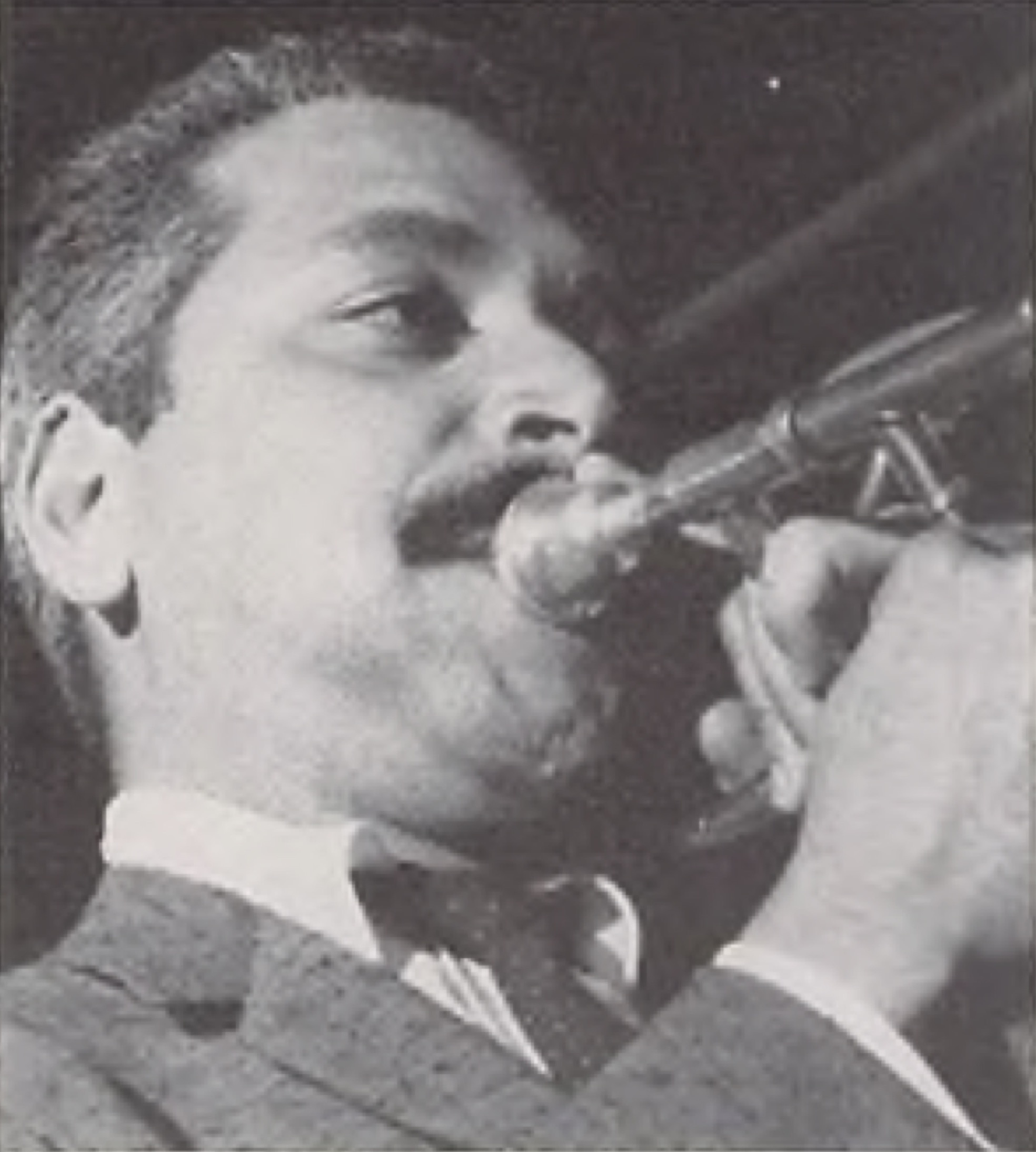
- Rosolino circa 1963

Background information
- Born: August 20, 1926; Detroit, Michigan, U.S.
- Died: November 26, 1978 (aged 52) Van Nuys, California, U.S.
- Genre: Jazz
- Occupation: Musician
- Instrument: Trombone
- Years active: 1945–1978

Frank Rosolino (August 20, 1926 – November 26, 1978) was an American jazz trombonist.

== Biography ==
Rosolino was born in Detroit, Michigan, on August 20, 1926. He learned to play the guitar at age nine from his musically inclined father, but switched to the trombone at age fourteen. He performed with the big bands of Bob Chester, Glen Gray, Tony Pastor, Herbie Fields, Gene Krupa, and Stan Kenton. After a period with Kenton, he settled in Los Angeles, where he performed with Howard Rumsey's Lighthouse All-Stars (1954–1960) in Hermosa Beach. His composition "Blue Daniel" was first recorded by Shelly Manne & His Men in 1959 and later became a jazz standard, with notable versions by The Cannonball Adderley Quintet and Ben Sidran, who wrote lyrics for the song in 1979.

Throughout the 1960s and 1970s, between nightclub engagements, Rosolino was active in Los Angeles recording studios, performing with such notables as Frank Sinatra, Billy Eckstine, Sarah Vaughan, Tony Bennett, Peggy Lee, Mel Tormé, Michel Legrand, and Quincy Jones. In the mid-to-late 1960s, he and fellow trombonist Mike Barone, billed as "Trombones Unlimited," recorded several albums for Liberty Records featuring pop-style arrangements of current hits, including the 1968 album Grazing in the Grass. He can also be seen performing with Shelly Manne's group in the films I Want to Live! (1958), starring Susan Hayward, and Sweet Smell of Success (1957), with Burt Lancaster and Tony Curtis. He was a regular on The Steve Allen Show and appeared as a guest on The Tonight Show and The Merv Griffin Show. Rosolino was also a talented vocalist, renowned for his exuberant style of scat singing, notably on Gene Krupa's hit recording "Lemon Drop."

During the 1970s, Rosolino performed and toured with Quincy Jones and the Grammy Award–winning group Supersax.

=== Death ===
Rosolino's private life was deeply troubled. On November 26, 1978, he shot both of his sons—11-year-old Justin and 7-year-old Jason—as they slept. Justin died instantly; Jason survived but was blinded. Rosolino then fatally shot himself.

== Discography ==
=== As leader ===
- Frank Rosolino (Capitol, 1954)
- Frankly Speaking (Capitol, 1955)
- I Play Trombone (Bethlehem, 1956)
- Frank Rosolino Quintet (Mode, 1957)
- Turn Me Loose! (Reprise, 1961)
- Jazz a Confronto 4 (Horo, 1973)
- Conversation with Conte Candoli (RCA Victor, 1976)
- Just Friends with Conte Candoli (MPS, 1977)
- Thinking About You (Sackville, 1984) – rec. 1976
- Free for All (Speciality, 1986) – rec. 1958
- The Last Recording (Sea Breeze, 2006) – rec. 1978

=== As sideman ===
With Georgie Auld

- In the Land of Hi-Fi with Georgie Auld and His Orchestra (EmArcy/Mercury, 1956)
- The Georgie Auld Quintet Plays the Winners (Philips, 1963)

With Max Bennett

- Max Bennett (Bethlehem, 1955)
- Max Bennett Plays (Bethlehem, 1956)

With Francy Boland

- Blue Flame (MPS/BASF 1976)
- Red Hot (MPS, 1977)
- White Heat (MPS, 1978)

With Buddy Bregman

- Swinging Kicks (Verve, 1957)
- Swingin' Standards (World Pacific, 1959)

With Benny Carter

- Jazz Giant (Contemporary, 1958)
- Aspects (United Artists, 1959)

With June Christy

- Fair and Warmer! (Capitol, 1957)
- June's Got Rhythm (Capitol, 1958)
- June Christy Recalls Those Kenton Days (Capitol, 1959)
- Do-Re-Mi (Capitol, 1961)
- Big Band Specials (Capitol, 1962)
- Impromptu (Interplay, 1977)

With Victor Feldman

- Vic Feldman on Vibes (Mode, 1957)
- Latinsville! (Contemporary, 1964)

With Terry Gibbs

- Launching a New Band (Mercury, 1959)
- The Exciting Terry Gibbs Big Band (Verve, 1961)
- Explosion! (Mercury, 1962)

With Vince Guaraldi

- You're in Love, Charlie Brown (Lee Mendelson Film Productions, 1967)
- It Was a Short Summer, Charlie Brown (Lee Mendelson Film Productions, 1969)

With Bill Holman

- In a Jazz Orbit (Andex, 1958)
- Bill Holman's Great Big Band (Capitol, 1960)

With Quincy Jones

- The Hot Rock OST (Prophesy, 1972)
- Body Heat (A&M, 1974)
- Mellow Madness (A&M, 1975)
- I Heard That!! (A&M, 1976)

With Stan Kenton

- New Concepts of Artistry in Rhythm (Capitol, 1953)
- Popular Favorites by Stan Kenton (Capitol, 1953)
- Sketches on Standards (Capitol, 1953)
- This Modern World (Capitol, 1953)
- Portraits on Standards (Capitol, 1953)
- Kenton Showcase (Capitol, 1954)
- The Kenton Era (Capitol, 1955)

With Gene Krupa

- Drummin' Man (Columbia, 1963)
- 1949 (Alamac, 1974)

With Stan Levey

- This Time the Drum's On Me (Bethlehem, 1956)
- Grand Stan (Bethlehem, 1957)

With Shelly Manne

- My Fair Lady with the Un-original Cast (Capitol, 1964)
- Manne–That's Gershwin! (Capitol, 1965)

With Charlie Mariano

- Mariano (Bethlehem, 1955)
- Charlie Mariano Plays (Bethlehem, 1956)

With Skip Martin

- Scheherajazz (Pye/Golden Guinea 1959)
- Songs and Sounds from the Era of the Untouchables (Somerset 1960)
- Perspectives in Percussion Vol. 1 (Somerset/Stereo-Fidelity, 1961)
- Perspectives in Percussion Vol. 2 (Somerset/Stereo-Fidelity, 1961)

With Gerry Mulligan

- The Jazz Combo from I Want to Live! (United Artists, 1958)
- Nightwatch (United Artists, 1961)

With Anita O'Day

- Cool Heat (Verve, 1959)
- Trav'lin' Light (Verve, 1961)

With Shorty Rogers

- Shorty Rogers Plays Richard Rodgers (RCA Victor, 1957)
- Portrait of Shorty (RCA Victor, 1958)
- Afro-Cuban Influence (RCA Victor, 1958)
- The Wizard of Oz and Other Harold Arlen Songs (RCA Victor, 1959)
- Shorty Rogers Meets Tarzan (MGM, 1960)
- The Swingin' Nutcracker (RCA Victor, 1960)
- An Invisible Orchard (RCA Victor, 1997)

With Pete Rugolo

- Music for Hi-Fi Bugs (EmArcy, 1956)
- Out on a Limb (EmArcy, 1957)
- An Adventure in Sound: Brass in Hi-Fi (Mercury, 1958)
- Percussion at Work (EmArcy, 1958)
- Rugolo Plays Kenton (EmArcy, 1958)
- The Music from Richard Diamond (EmArcy, 1959)
- Behind Brigitte Bardot (Warner Bros., 1960)
- 10 Trombones Like 2 Pianos (Mercury, 1961)
- The Original Music of Thriller (Time, 1961)

With Howard Rumsey's Lighthouse All-Stars

- Vol. 6 (Contemporary, 1955)
- Lighthouse at Laguna (Contemporary, 1956)
- Volume Three (Contemporary, 1956)
- Music for Lighthousekeeping (Contemporary, 1957)
- Double or Nothin' (Liberty, 1957)
- In the Solo Spotlight! (Contemporary, 1957)
- Jazz Rolls Royce (Lighthouse, 1958)
- Jazz Structures (Philips, 1961)

With Lalo Schifrin

- Gone with the Wave (Colpix, 1965)
- Jazz Suite on the Mass Texts (RCA Victor, 1965)

With Horace Silver

- Silver 'n Brass (Blue Note, 1975)
- Silver 'n Wood (Blue Note, 1976)

With Zoot Sims

- Zoot Sims (Vogue, 1973)
- Hawthorne Nights (Pablo, 1977)

With Joanie Sommers

- For Those Who Think Young (Warner Bros., 1962)
- The Voice of the Sixties! (Warner Bros., 1961)

With Sonny Stitt

- Sonny Stitt Plays Jimmy Giuffre Arrangements (Verve, 1959)
- I Remember Bird (Catalyst, 1977)

With Frank Strazzeri

- Taurus (Revelation, 1973)
- Frames (Glendale, 1975)

With Supersax

- Supersax Plays Bird with Strings (Capitol, 1975)
- Chasin' the Bird (MPS, 1977)
- Dynamite!! (MPS, 1979)

With Mel Torme

- Swings Shubert Alley (Verve, 1960)
- I Dig the Duke/I Dig the Count (Verve, 1962)
- A Day in the Life of Bonnie and Clyde (Liberty, 1968)

With others

- Steve Allen, Steve Allen Plays Bossa Nova Jazz (Dot, 1963)
- Chet Baker, Chet Baker Big Band (Pacific Jazz, 1957)
- Jesse Belvin, Mr. Easy (RCA, 1960)
- Louie Bellson, Louie Rides Again! (Percussion Power 1974)
- Betty Bennett, Nobody Else But Me (Atlantic, 1955)
- Elmer Bernstein, The Man with the Golden Arm OST (Decca, 1956)
- Harry Betts, The Jazz Soul of Doctor Kildare (Choreo, 1962)
- Brass Fever, Brass Fever (Impulse!, 1975)
- Les Brown, Jazz Song Book (Coral, 1960)
- Salvador Camarata, Camarata Featuring Tutti's Trombones (Coliseum, 1966)
- Frank Capp, Percussion in a Tribute to Henry Mancini (Kimberly, 1961)
- Keith Carradine, I'm Easy (Asylum, 1976)
- Ray Charles, At the Club (Philips, 1966)
- Buddy Collette, Jazz Loves Paris (Specialty, 1960)
- Bob Cooper, Coop! The Music of Bob Cooper (Contemporary, 1958)
- Alexander Courage, Hot Rod Rumble (Liberty, 1957)
- Paulinho da Costa, Agora (Pablo, 1977)
- Jackie Davis, Jackie Davis Meets the Trombones (Capitol, 1959)
- Frances Faye, Frances Faye in Frenzy (Verve, 1961)
- The Four Freshmen, Four Freshmen and 5 Trombones (Capitol, 1955)
- Gerald Fried, Dino (Epic, 1957)
- Curtis Fuller, J. J. Johnson, Frank Wess, The Trombone Album (Savoy, 1980)
- Russell Garcia, Four Horns and a Lush Life (Bethlehem, 1956)
- Dizzy Gillespie, The New Continent (Limelight, 1965)
- Benny Golson, Killer Joe (Columbia, 1977)
- Chico Hamilton, Sweet Smell of Success (MCA, 1973)
- Richard Harris, The Yard Went On Forever (Dunhill, 1968)
- Paul Horn, Jazz Suite On the Mass Texts (RCA Victor, 1965)
- Helen Humes, Helen Humes (Contemporary, 1960)
- Jackie and Roy, Free and Easy! (ABC-Paramount, 1958)
- Richie Kamuca & Bill Holman, Jazz Erotica (HiFi, 1957)
- Barney Kessel, Let's Cook! (Contemporary, 1962)
- Peggy Lee, Let's Love (Atlantic, 1974)
- Johnny Mandel, I Want to Live (United Artists, 1958)
- Harvey Mason, Marching in the Street (Arista, 1975)
- Sergio Mendes, Homecooking (Elektra, 1976)
- Don Menza, First Flight (Catalyst, 1977)
- Mark Murphy, Playing the Field (Capitol, 1960)
- Tommy Newsom, Live from Beautiful Downtown Burbank (Direct-Disk, 1978)
- Lennie Niehaus, Zounds! (Contemporary, 1958)
- Tom Ranier, Ranier (Warner Bros., 1976)
- Buddy Rich, This One's for Basie (Norgran, 1956)
- Johnny Richards, Something Else by Johnny Richards (Bethlehem, 1956)
- Lee Ritenour, First Course (Epic, 1976)
- Max Roach and Stan Levey, Drummin' the Blues (Liberty, 1958)
- Howard Roberts, Something's Cookin' (Capitol, 1965)
- Moacir Santos, Maestro (Blue Note, 1972)
- Bud Shank, Girl in Love (World Pacific, 1966)
- Cybill Shepherd, Mad About the Boy (Inner City, 1980)
- Ben Sidran, Puttin' in Time On Planet Earth (Blue Thumb, 1973)
- Frank Sinatra, Ring-a-Ding Ding! (Reprise, 1961)
- Cal Tjader, Huracan (Crystal Clear, 1978)
- Tower of Power, Back to Oakland (Warner Bros., 1974)
- Bobby Troup, Bobby Troup and His Stars of Jazz (RCA Victor, 1959)
- Sarah Vaughan, Orchestra Arranged and Conducted by Michel Legrand (Mainstream, 1973)
- Tommy Vig, Encounter with Time (Discovery, 1977)
- Joe Williams, With Love (Temponic, 1972)
