= Ruth Price =

American singer

- Born: April 27, 1938 (age 88); Phoenixville, Pennsylvania, U.S.
- Genres: Jazz, vocal jazz
- Occupation: Singer

Ruth Price (born April 27, 1938) is an American jazz singer and Artistic Director of the Jazz Bakery in Los Angeles, California. Price attended ballet school in 1952. In 1954, she sang with Charlie Ventura and later worked as a singer and dancer in Philadelphia and New York City. She moved to Hollywood in 1957 and toured with Harry James from 1964 to 1965. In the 1960s and 1970s, she had several TV appearances both as herself in musical specials and as an actress in popular TV shows of the time.

Price's repertoire includes many obscure, lesser-known gems from the Great American Songbook. She has worked as an adjunct assistant professor at the UCLA Department of Ethnomusicology.

== Discography ==
Recorded	Album Title	Label	Catalogue No.	Release
1955	My Name Is Ruth Price....I Sing!	Kapp	KL-1006	LP/CD
1956	Ruth Price Sings with the Johnny Smith Quartet	(Roost	RLP 2217	LP/CD
1957	The Party's Over	Kapp Records	KL-1054	LP
1961	Ruth Price with Shelly Manne & His Men at the Manne-Hole	Contemporary	S7590	LP/CD
1963	Live And Beautiful	Ava	A-54	LP
1983	Lucky To Be Me	ITI		LP
2014	Dearly Beloved	Blue Playa Records		CD/Digital Compilation Album
