= Shelly Manne =

American jazz drummer (1920–1984)

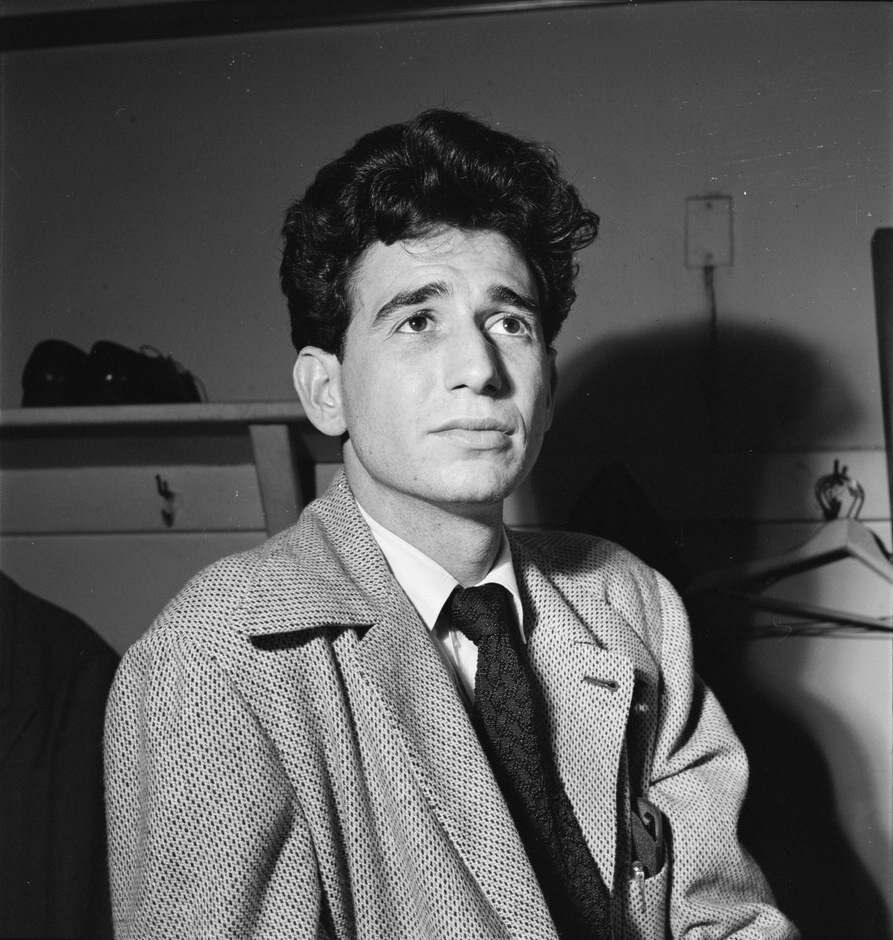
- Shelly Manne, December 1946

Background information
- Born: Sheldon Manne; June 11, 1920; New York City, New York, U.S.
- Died: September 26, 1984 (aged 64) Los Angeles, California, U.S.
- Genres: Jazz; cool jazz; third stream
- Occupations: Drummer; percussionist; composer; bandleader
- Instruments: Drums; percussion
- Years active: 1939–1984

Sheldon "Shelly" Manne (June 11, 1920 – September 26, 1984) was an American jazz drummer. Most frequently associated with West Coast jazz, he was known for his versatility and also played in a number of other styles, including Dixieland, swing, bebop, avant-garde jazz, and later fusion. He also contributed to the musical background of hundreds of Hollywood films and television programs.

== Family and origins ==
Sheldon "Shelly" Manne was born June 11, 1920, in Manhattan, New York City, New York. Manne's father Max Manne and uncles were drummers. In his youth he admired many of the leading swing drummers of the day, especially Jo Jones and Dave Tough. Billy Gladstone, a colleague of Manne's father and the most admired percussionist on the New York theatrical scene, offered the teenage Shelly tips and encouragement.

From that time, Manne rapidly developed his style in the clubs of 52nd Street in New York in the late 1930s and 1940s. His first professional job with a known big band was with the Bobby Byrne Orchestra in 1940. In those years, as he became known, he recorded with jazz stars like Coleman Hawkins, Charlie Shavers, and Don Byas. He also worked with a number of musicians mainly associated with Duke Ellington, like Johnny Hodges, Harry Carney, Lawrence Brown, and Rex Stewart.

In 1942, during World War II, Manne joined the Coast Guard and served until 1945.

In 1943, Manne married a Rockette named Florence Butterfield (known affectionately to family and friends as "Flip"), a marriage that would last 41 years, until his death.

When the bebop movement began to change jazz in the 1940s, Manne loved it and adapted to the style rapidly, performing with Dizzy Gillespie and Charlie Parker. Around this time he also worked with rising stars like Flip Phillips, Charlie Ventura, Lennie Tristano, and Lee Konitz.

Manne rose to stardom when he became part of the working bands of Woody Herman and, especially, Stan Kenton in the late 1940s and early 1950s, winning awards and developing a following at a time when jazz was the most popular music in the United States. Joining the hard-swinging Herman outfit allowed Manne to play the bebop he loved. The controversial Kenton band, on the other hand, with its "progressive jazz", presented obstacles, and many of the complex, overwrought arrangements made it harder to swing. But Manne appreciated the musical freedom that Kenton gave him and saw it as an opportunity to experiment along with what was still a highly innovative band. He rose to the challenge, finding new colors and rhythms, and developing his ability to provide support in a variety of musical situations.

== In California ==
In the early 1950s, Manne left New York and settled permanently on a ranch in an outlying part of Los Angeles, where he and his wife raised horses. From this point on, he played an important role in the West Coast school of jazz, performing on the Los Angeles jazz scene with Shorty Rogers, Hampton Hawes, Red Mitchell, Art Pepper, Russ Freeman, Frank Rosolino, Chet Baker, Leroy Vinnegar, Pete Jolly, Howard McGhee, Bob Gordon, Conte Candoli, Sonny Criss, and numerous others. Many of his recordings around this time were for Lester Koenig's Contemporary Records, where for a period Manne had a contract as an "exclusive" artist (that is, he needed permission to record for other labels).

Manne led a number of small groups that recorded under his name and leadership. One consisting of Manne on drums, trumpeter Joe Gordon, saxophonist Richie Kamuca, bassist Monty Budwig, and pianist Victor Feldman performed for three days in 1959 at the Black Hawk club in San Francisco. Their music was recorded on the spot, and four LPs were issued. Highly regarded as an innovative example of a "live" jazz recording, the Black Hawk sessions were reissued on CD in augmented form years later.

== West Coast jazz ==
Manne is often associated with the once frequently criticized West Coast school of jazz. He has been considered "the quintessential" drummer in what was seen as a West Coast movement, though Manne himself did not care to be so pigeonholed. In the 1950s, much of what he did could be seen as in the West Coast style: performing in tightly arranged compositions in what was a cool style, as in his 1953 album named The West Coast Sound, for which he commissioned several original compositions. Some West Coast jazz was experimental, avant-garde music several years before the avant-garde playing of Cecil Taylor and Ornette Coleman became mainstream (Manne also recorded with Coleman in 1959); a good deal of Manne's work with Jimmy Giuffre was of this kind. Critics would condemn much of this music as overly cerebral.

Another side of West Coast jazz that also came under critical fire was music in a lighter style, intended for popular consumption. Manne made contributions here too. Best known is the series of albums he recorded with pianist André Previn and with members of his groups, based on music from popular Broadway shows, movies, and television programs. (The first and most successful of these was the My Fair Lady album based on songs from the musical, recorded by Previn, Manne, and bassist Leroy Vinnegar in 1956.) The recordings for the Contemporary label, with each album devoted to a single musical, are in a light, immediately appealing style aimed at popular taste. This did not always go over well with aficionados of "serious" jazz, which may be one reason why Manne has been frequently overlooked in accounts of major jazz drummers of the 20th century.

Much of the music produced on the West Coast in those years, as Robert Gordon concedes, was in fact imitative and "lacked the fire and intensity associated with the best jazz performances". But Gordon also points out that there is a level of musical sophistication, as well as an intensity and "swing", in the music recorded by Manne with Previn and Vinnegar (and later Red Mitchell) that is missing in the many lackluster albums of this type produced by others in that period.

West Coast jazz, however, represented only a small part of Manne's playing. In Los Angeles, and occasionally returning to New York and elsewhere, Manne recorded with musicians of all schools and styles, ranging from those of the swing era through bebop to later developments in modern jazz, including hard bop, usually seen as the antithesis of the cool jazz frequently associated with West Coast playing.

== Collaborations ==
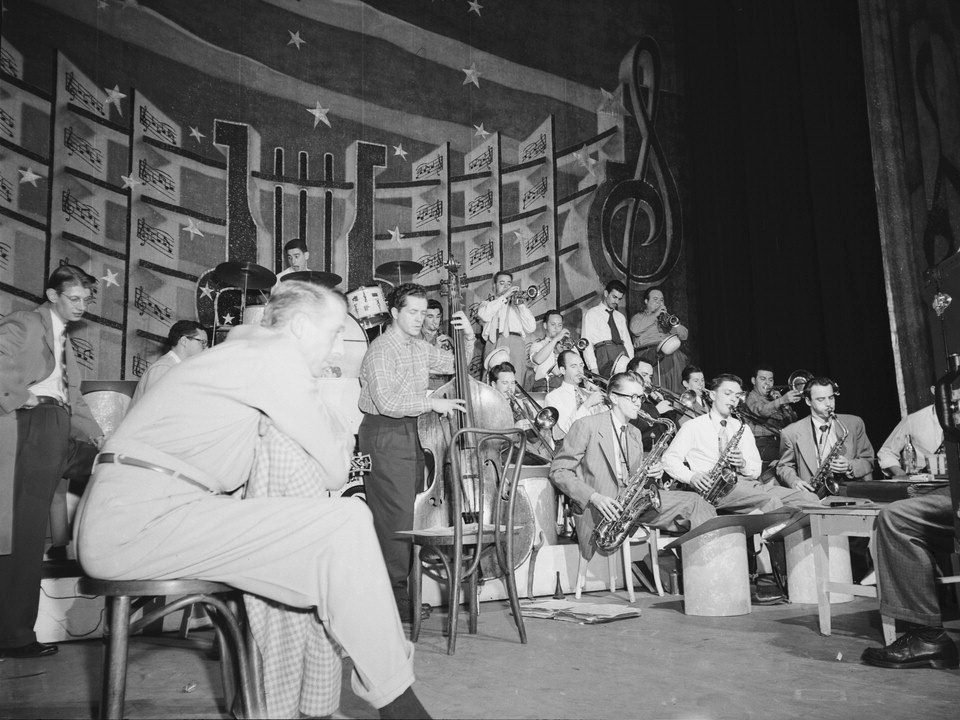
Stan Kenton, Eddie Safranski, Shelly Manne, Chico Alvarez, Ray Wetzel, Harry Betts, Bob Cooper, and Art Pepper, 1947 or 1948

From the 78-rpm recordings of the 1940s to the LPs of the 1950s and later, to the hundreds of film soundtracks he appeared on, Manne's recorded output was enormous and often hard to pin down. According to the jazz writer Leonard Feather, Manne's drumming had been heard on well "over a thousand LPs"—a statement that Feather made in 1960, when Manne had not reached even the midpoint of his 45-year-long career.

An extremely selective list of those with whom Manne performed includes Benny Carter, Earl Hines, Clifford Brown, Zoot Sims, Ben Webster, Maynard Ferguson, Wardell Gray, Lionel Hampton, Junior Mance, Jimmy Giuffre, and Stan Getz. In the 1950s, he recorded two solid albums with Sonny Rollins—Way Out West (Contemporary, 1957) received particular acclaim and helped dispel the notion that West Coast jazz was always different from jazz made on the East Coast—and, in the 1960s, two with Bill Evans. Around the same time in 1959, Manne recorded with the traditional Benny Goodman and the iconoclastic Ornette Coleman, a striking example of his versatility.

One of Manne's most adventurous 1960s collaborations was with Jack Marshall, the guitarist and arranger celebrated for composing the theme and incidental music for The Munsters TV show in that period. Two duet albums (Sounds Unheard Of!, 1962, and Sounds!, 1966) feature Marshall on guitar, accompanied by Manne playing drums and a wide variety of percussion instruments unusual in jazz, from "Hawaiian slit bamboo sticks", to a Chinese gong, to castanets, to piccolo Boo-Bam.

Another example of Manne's ability to transcend the narrow borders of any particular school is the series of trio albums he recorded with guitarist Barney Kessel and bassist Ray Brown as "The Poll Winners". (They had all won numerous polls conducted by the popular publications of the day; the polls are now forgotten, but the albums endure, now reissued on CD.) Manne even dabbled in Dixieland and fusion, as well as "Third Stream" music. He participated in the revival of that jazz precursor ragtime (he appears on several albums devoted to the music of Scott Joplin), and sometimes recorded with musicians best associated with European classical music. He always, however, returned to the straight-ahead jazz he loved best.

== Style and influences ==
In addition to Dave Tough and Jo Jones, Manne admired and learned from contemporaries like Max Roach and Kenny Clarke, and later from younger drummers like Elvin Jones and Tony Williams. Consciously or unconsciously, he borrowed a little from all of them, always searching to extend his playing into new territory.

Despite these and numerous other influences, however, Shelly Manne's style of drumming was always his own—personal, precise, clear, and at the same time multilayered, using a very broad range of colors. Manne was often experimental, and had participated in such musically exploratory groups of the early 1950s as those of Jimmy Giuffre and Teddy Charles. Yet his playing never became overly cerebral, and he never neglected that element usually considered fundamental to all jazz: time.

Whether playing Dixieland, bebop, or avant-garde jazz, in big bands or in small groups, Manne emphasized that his main objective was to make the music swing. His fellow musicians attested to his listening appreciatively to those around him and being ultra-sensitive to the needs and the nuances of the music played by the others in the band, his goal being to make them—and the music as a whole—sound better, rather than calling attention to himself with overbearing solos.

Manne refused to play in a powerhouse style, but his understated drumming was appreciated for its own strengths. In 1957, critic Nat Hentoff called Manne one of the most "musical" and "illuminatively imaginative" drummers. Composer and multi-instrumentalist Bob Cooper called him "the most imaginative drummer I've worked with". In later years this kind of appreciation for what Manne could do was echoed by jazz notables like Louie Bellson, John Lewis, Ray Brown, Harry "Sweets" Edison, and numerous others who had worked with him at various times. Composer, arranger, bandleader, and multi-instrumentalist Benny Carter was "a great admirer of his work". "He could read anything, get any sort of effect", said Carter, who worked closely with Manne over many decades.

Though he always insisted on the importance of time and "swing", Manne's concept of his own drumming style typically pointed to his melody-based approach. He contrasted his style with that of Max Roach: "Max plays melodically from the rhythms he plays. I play rhythms from thinking melodically".

Manne had strong preferences in his choice of drum set. Those preferences, however, changed several times over his career. He began with Gretsch drums. In 1957, intrigued by the sound of a kind of drum made by Leedy (then owned by Slingerland), he had a line made for him that also became popular with other drummers. In the 1970s, after trying and abandoning many others for reasons of sound or maintainability, he settled on the Japanese-made Pearl Drums.

== Singers ==
Manne was also acclaimed by singers. Jackie Cain, of the vocal team of Jackie and Roy ("Roy" being Roy Kral), claimed that she had "never heard a drummer play so beautifully behind a singer". Jackie and Roy were only two of the many singers he played behind, recording several albums with that husband-and-wife team, with their contemporary June Christy, and with Helen Humes, originally made famous by her singing with the Count Basie orchestra.

Over decades, Manne recorded additional albums, or sometimes just sat in on drums here and there, with renowned vocalists like Ella Fitzgerald, Mel Tormé, Peggy Lee, Frank Sinatra, Ernestine Anderson, Sarah Vaughan, Lena Horne, Blossom Dearie, and Nancy Wilson. Not all the singers Manne accompanied were even primarily jazz artists. Performers as diverse as Teresa Brewer, Leontyne Price, Tom Waits, and Barry Manilow included Manne in their recording sessions.

== Film and television ==
At first, jazz was heard in film soundtracks only when a jazz-band performance was an element of the story. Early in his career, Manne was occasionally seen and heard in the movies, for example in the 1942 film Seven Days Leave, as the drummer in the highly popular Les Brown orchestra (soon to be known as "Les Brown and His Band of Renown").

In the 1950s, however, jazz began to be used for all or parts of film soundtracks, and Manne pioneered in these efforts, beginning with The Wild One (1953). As jazz quickly assumed a major role in the musical background of films, so did Manne assume a major role as a drummer and percussionist on those soundtracks. A notable early example was 1955's The Man with the Golden Arm; Manne not only played drums throughout but functioned as a personal assistant to director Otto Preminger and tutored star Frank Sinatra. The Decca soundtrack LP credits him prominently for the "Drumming Sequences".

From then on, as jazz became more prominent in the movies, Manne became the go-to percussion man in the film industry; he even appeared on screen in some minor roles. A major example is Johnny Mandel's jazz score for I Want to Live! in 1958.

Soon, Manne began to contribute to film music in a broader way, often combining jazz, pop, and classical music. Henry Mancini in particular found plenty of work for him; the two shared an interest in experimenting with tone colors, and Mancini came to rely on Manne to shape the percussive effects in his music. Breakfast at Tiffany's (1961), Hatari! (1962) and The Pink Panther (1963) are only a few of Mancini's films where Manne's drums and special percussive effects could be heard.

Manne frequently collaborated with Mancini in television as well, such as in the series Peter Gunn (1958–1961) and Mr. Lucky (1959–1960). Although Mancini developed such a close partnership with Manne that he was using him for practically all his scores and other music at this time, the drummer still found time to perform on movie soundtracks and in TV shows with music by others, including the series Richard Diamond (music by Pete Rugolo, 1959–1960), and Checkmate (music by John Williams, 1959–1962), and the film version of Leonard Bernstein's West Side Story (1961).

In the late 1950s, Manne began to compose his own film scores, such as that for The Proper Time (1959), with the music also played by his own group, Shelly Manne and His Men, and issued on a Contemporary LP. In later years, Manne divided his time playing the drums on, adding special percussive effects to, and sometimes writing complete scores for both film and television. He even provided a musical setting for a recording of the Dr. Seuss children's classic Green Eggs and Ham (1960) and later performed in and sometimes wrote music for the backgrounds of numerous animated cartoons. For example, he joined other notable jazz musicians (including Ray Brown and Jimmy Rowles) in playing Doug Goodwin's music for the cartoon series The Ant and the Aardvark (1969–1971). Notable examples of later scores that Manne wrote himself and also performed in are, for the movies, Young Billy Young (1969) and Trader Horn (1973), and, for television, Daktari, 1966–1969. With these and other contributions to cartoons, children's stories, movies, television programs (and even commercials), Manne's drumming became woven into the popular culture of several decades.

== Shelly's Manne-Hole ==
Manne was part-owner of the Los Angeles nightclub Shelly's Manne-Hole, located at 1608 North Cahuenga Boulevard from 1960 to 1972, then at a second location at Tetou's restaurant on Wilshire Boulevard until it closed in 1973. The house band at the nightclub was Shelly Manne and His Men, which featured some of Manne's favorite sidemen, such as Russ Freeman, Monty Budwig, Richie Kamuca, Conte Candoli, and later Frank Strozier, John Morell, and Mike Wofford, among many other notable West Coast jazz musicians. Also appearing at the club was a roster of jazz stars from different eras and all regions, including Ben Webster, Rahsaan Roland Kirk, John Coltrane, Sonny Stitt, Thelonious Monk, Michel Legrand, Carmen McRae, Milt Jackson, Teddy Edwards, Monty Alexander, Lenny Breau and Miles Davis. A substantial number of live albums were recorded there, including Live! Shelly Manne & His Men at the Manne-Hole (1961), Bill Evans's At Shelly's Manne-Hole (1963), Cannonball Adderley's Cannonball Adderley Live! (1964), Les McCann's Live at Shelly's Manne-Hole (1965) and Keith Jarrett's Somewhere Before (1969).

Late in 1973, Manne was forced to close the club for financial reasons. Stan Getz was the last artist to be featured there, at the briefly-occupied second location.

== Later career ==
After the close of Shelly's Manne-Hole, Manne refocused his attention on his own drumming. It might be argued that he never played with more taste, refinement, and soulful swing than in the 1970s, when he recorded numerous albums with musicians like trumpeter Red Rodney, pianist Hank Jones, saxophonists Art Pepper and Lew Tabackin, and composer-arranger-saxophonist Oliver Nelson.

From 1974 to 1977 he joined guitarist Laurindo Almeida, saxophonist and flutist Bud Shank, and bassist Ray Brown to perform as the group The L.A. Four, which recorded four albums before Manne left the ensemble.

In the 1980s, Manne recorded with such stars as trumpeter Harry "Sweets" Edison, saxophonist Zoot Sims, guitarists Joe Pass and Herb Ellis, and pianist John Lewis (famous as the musical director of the Modern Jazz Quartet).

Meanwhile, he continued to record with various small groups of his own. Just one representative example of his work in this period is a live concert recorded at the Los Angeles club "Carmelo's" in 1980 with pianists Bill Mays and Alan Broadbent and bassist Chuck Domanico. With their enthusiasm and spontaneity, and the sense that the audience in the intimate ambience of the club is participating in the music, these performances share the characteristics that had been celebrated more than two decades before in the better-known Black Hawk performances. Although this phase of his career has frequently been overlooked, Manne, by this time, had greatly refined his ability to back other musicians sympathetically, yet make his own musical thoughts clearly heard.

Manne's heavy load of Hollywood studio work sometimes shifted his attention from his mainstream jazz playing. Even in lackluster films, however, he nevertheless often succeeded in making art of what might be called hackwork. Still, for all his tireless work in the studios, Manne's labor of love was his contribution to jazz as an American art form, to which he had dedicated himself since his youth and continued to work at almost to the last day of his life.

Manne died somewhat before the popular revival of interest in jazz had gained momentum. But in his last few years, his immense contribution to the music regained at least some local recognition, and the role Manne had played in the culture of his adopted city began to draw public appreciation. Two weeks before his sudden death of a heart attack, he was honored by the City of Los Angeles in conjunction with the Hollywood Arts Council when September 9, 1984, was declared "Shelly Manne Day".
