= 1958 in jazz =

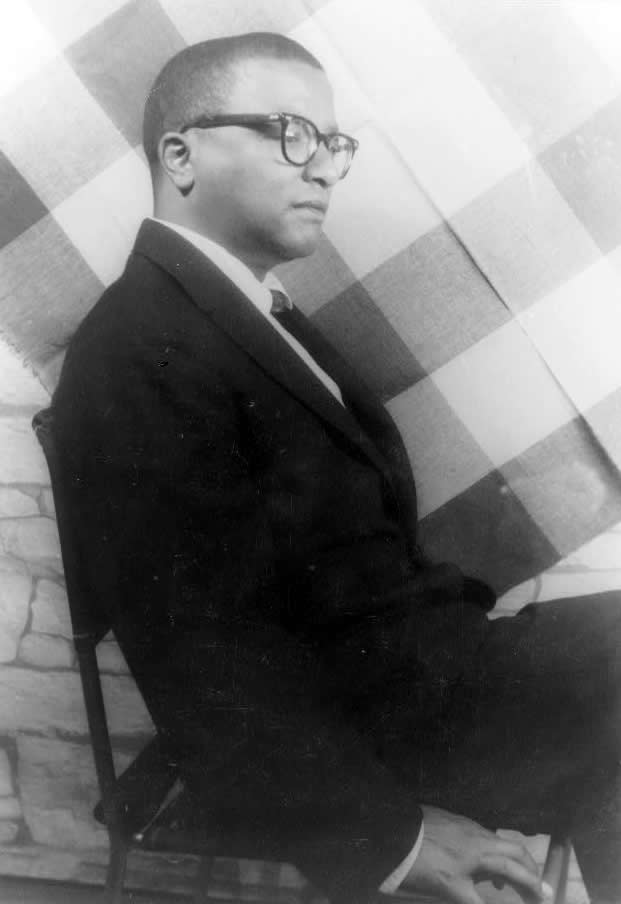
- Jazz pianist Billy Strayhorn in 1958
- Decade: 1950s in jazz
- Music: 1958 in music
- Standards: List of post-1950 jazz standards
- See also: 1957 in jazz – 1959 in jazz

This is a timeline documenting events of Jazz in the year 1958.

== Events ==
=== July ===
- 3 – The 5th Newport Jazz Festival started in Newport, Rhode Island (July 3 – 6).

=== August ===
- 12 – A Great Day in Harlem, a black and white group photograph of 57 notable jazz musicians, is taken in front of a brownstone building in Harlem, New York City.

== Album releases ==
- Cannonball Adderley: Somethin' Else
- Chet Baker: Everything Happens to Me
- Art Blakey: Moanin' (recorded, released 1959)
- Red Garland: "Manteca (album)"
- Stan Getz and the Oscar Peterson Trio: Stan Getz and the Oscar Peterson Trio
- Jimmy Giuffre
  - Western Suite (recorded, released 1960)
  - The Four Brothers Sound
- Chico Hamilton: "South Pacific in Hi-Fi"
- Stan Kenton: Back to Balboa
- Blue Mitchell: Big 6
- Hank Mobley: Peckin' Time
- Thelonious Monk: Misterioso
- Max Roach: Deeds, Not Words
- Sonny Rollins: Freedom Suite
- Mongo Santamaria: Yambu
- John Serry Sr.: Chicago Musette – John Serry and His Accordion
- Cecil Taylor: Looking Ahead!
- Clark Terry: In Orbit
- Toots Thielemans: Man Bites Harmonica!
- Cal Tjader: Latin Concert
- Monica Zetterlund: Swedish Sensation

== Deaths ==
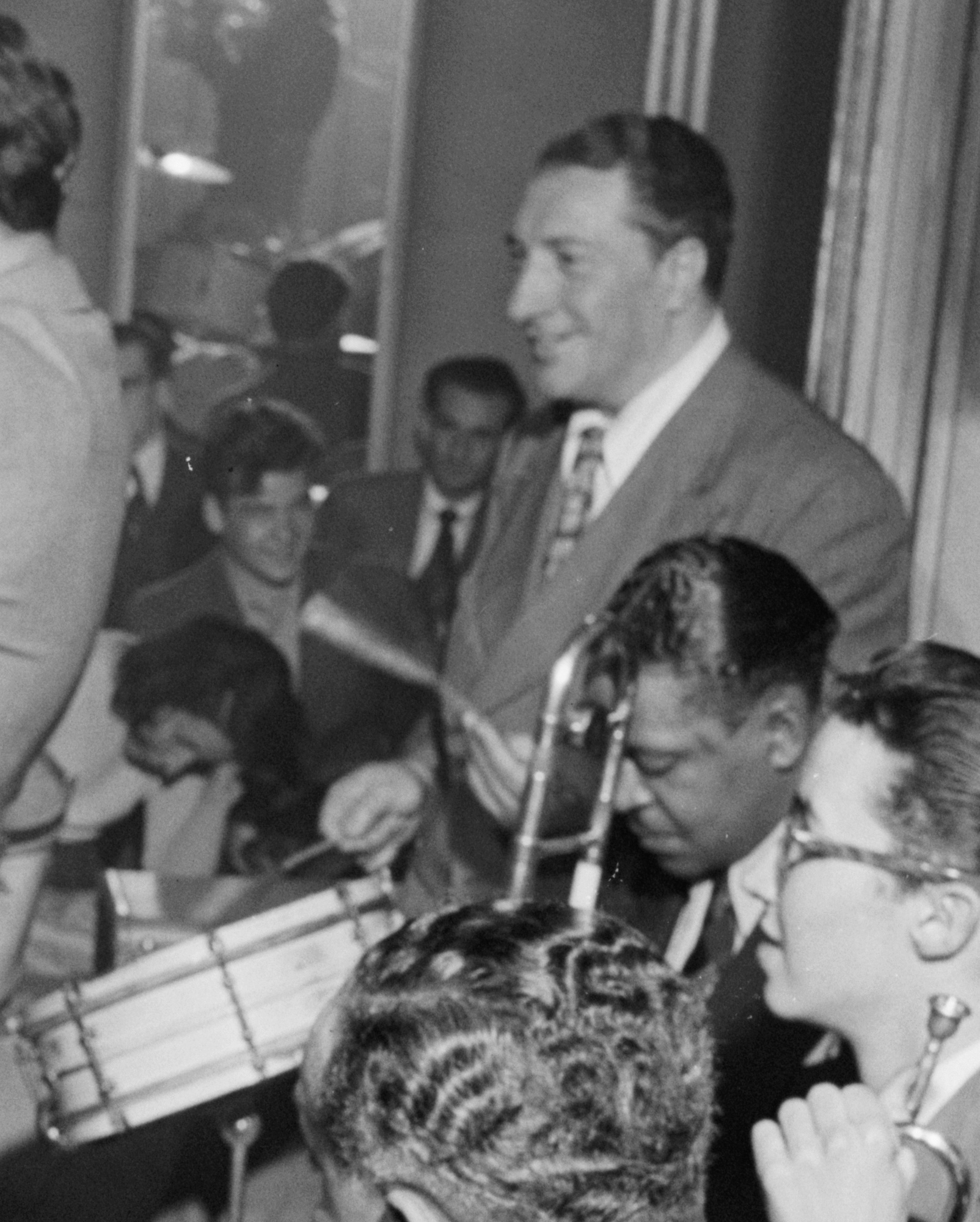
Danny Alvin, Webster Hall, New York, N.Y., May 9, 1947

January

- 1 – Fulton McGrath, American pianist and songwriter (born 1907).

March

- 17 – Carl Perkins, American pianist (born 1928).
- 25 – Tom Brown, New Orleans trombonist (born 1888).
- 28 – W. C. Handy, African-American blues composer and musician (born 1873).

May

- 8 – Ted Donnelly, American trombonist (born 1912).

June

- Sterling Bose, American trumpeter and cornetist (born 1906).

July

- 2 – Martha Boswell, American singer and pianist (born 1905).

September

- 13 – Lorraine Geller, American pianist (born 1928).
- 17 – Herbie Fields, American saxophonist and clarinetist, bandleader (born 1919).

October

- 2 – George E. Lee, American bandleader (born 1896).

November

- 7 – Joe Morris, American trumpeter and bandleader (born 1922).
- 11 – Olivia Plunket Greene, English musician, Bright Young Things (born 1907).
- 26 – Tiny Bradshaw, American bandleader, singer, composer, pianist, and drummer (born 1907).
- 30 – Shifty Henry, American bassist and songwriter (born 1921).

December

- 6 – Danny Alvin, American drummer and bandleader (born 1902).
- 25 – Doc Cook, American bandleader and arranger (born 1891).

== Births ==
January

- 26 – Anita Baker, American singer-songwriter
- 30 – Bjørn Klakegg, Norwegian guitarist.
- 31 – Tom Schuman, American keyboardist.

February

- 3 – Bob Holz, American drummer and composer.
- 7 – Frans Bak, Danish composer, choral conductor, saxophonist, and pianist.
- 8 – Bill Evans, American saxophonist.
- 10 – Michael Weiss, American pianist and composer.
- 18 – Gar Samuelson, American drummer (died 1999).
- 20 – Leroy Jones, American trumpeter.
- 23 – Carles Cases, Spanish-Catalonian pianist and cellist.
- 24 – Jerry Zigmont, American trombonist

March

- 5 – Ronan Guilfoyle, Irish acoustic bass guitarist.
- 10 – Jeanie Bryson, American singer.
- 12 – Leon Lee Dorsey, American bassist.
- 15 – Gerald L. Cannon, American upright bassist and visual artist.
- 19 – Anne-Marie Giørtz, Norwegian singer.
- 31 – Bajone, Serbian singer.

April

- 16 – Ulf Wakenius, Swedish guitarist.
- 17 – Chieli Minucci, American guitarist, composer, and producer.
- 30 – Ronaldo Folegatti, Brazilian composer, guitarist, and record producer (died 2007).

May

- 7 – Michael Formanek, American upright bassist.
- 10 – Claude Deppa, South African trumpeter.
- 17 – Carlos del Junco, Cuban-Canadian harmonica player.
- 29
  - Jim Snidero, American saxophonist.
  - Kenny Washington, American drummer.

June

- 6 – Wolfgang Mitterer, Austrian composer, organist, and keyboardist.
- 7
  - Jonas Hellborg, Swedish bass guitarist.
  - Prince Rogers Nelson, American singer-songwriter, multi-instrumentalist, and record producer (died 2016).
- 8 – Jakko Jakszyk, English guitarist and singer-songwriter.
- 14 – Kenny Drew, Jr., American pianist (died 2014).

July

- 8 – Jim Campilongo, American guitarist and composer.
- 10 – Béla Fleck, American banjo player.
- 11 – Kirk Whalum, American saxophonist and songwriter.
- 18 – Gabriel Fliflet, Norwegian accordionist and singer.
- 26 – Deirdre Cartwright, British guitarist and composer.
- 30 – Kevin Mahogany, American vocalist (died 2017).

August

- 26
  - Andrew Lamb, American saxophonist and flautist.
  - David Finck, American bassist.
- 29 – Jesse McGuire, American trumpeter.

September

- 3 – Lakki Patey, Norwegian guitarist and inventor.
- 5 – Lars Danielsson, Swedish upright bassist, composer, and record producer.
- 7 – Bruce Barth, American pianist.
- 8 – Stevie Vallance, Canadian singer.
- 16 – Rodney Franklin, American pianist and composer.
- 25 – Greg Boyer, American trombonist.
- 27
  - Paul Grabowsky, American pianist and composer.

October

- 1 – Ana Caram, Brazilian singer, guitarist, and flutist.
- 6 – Roberto Gatto, Italian drummer.
- 9 – Satoko Fujii, Japanese pianist, accordionist and composer.
- 13 – Jair-Rôhm Parker Wells, American bassist.
- 14 – Tomas Franck, Swedish tenor saxophonist.
- 17 – Howard Alden, American guitarist.
- 22 – Jan Gunnar Hoff, Norwegian pianist and composer.
- 27 – David Hazeltine, American pianist.
- 30 – Olav Dale, Norwegian saxophonist, composer and orchestra leader (died 2014).

November

- 1 – Joe DeRenzo, American drummer, composer, and producer.
- 8 – Don Byron, American composer, clarinetist, and multi-instrumentalist.
- 13 – Tony Lakatos, Hungarian saxophonist.

December

- 9 – George Koller, Canadian bassist and multi-instrumentalist.
- 10 – John Goldsby, American upright bassist, bandleader, and composer.
- 15 – Don Laka, South African pianist, songwriter, and producer.
- 16 – Erna Yuzbashyan, Armenian singer.
- 28 – David Berkman, American pianist, composer, and arranger.
- 29 – George Schuller, American drummer.
- 30
  - Ellen Sandweiss, American singer and actress.
  - Lewis Nash, American drummer.

Unknown date

- Carol Chaikin, American saxophonist, flautist, and composer.
- David Newton, Scottish pianist and composer.
- Nancy Zeltsman, American marimba soloist.

== See also ==
- 1950s in jazz
- List of years in jazz
- 1958 in music

== Bibliography ==
- The New Real Book, Volume I. Sher Music. 1988. ISBN 0-9614701-4-3.
- The New Real Book, Volume II. Sher Music. 1991. ISBN 0-9614701-7-8.
- The New Real Book, Volume III. Sher Music. 1995. ISBN 1-883217-30-X.
- The Real Book, Volume I (6th ed.). Hal Leonard. 2004. ISBN 0-634-06038-4.
- The Real Book, Volume II (2nd ed.). Hal Leonard. 2007. ISBN 978-1-4234-2452-9.
- The Real Book, Volume III (2nd ed.). Hal Leonard. 2006. ISBN 0-634-06136-4.
- The Real Jazz Book. Warner Bros. ISBN 978-91-85041-36-7.
- The Real Vocal Book, Volume I. Hal Leonard. 2006. ISBN 0-634-06080-5.
