= Fusion (Jimmy Giuffre 3 album) =

Studio album by Jimmy Giuffre
- Released: 1961
- Recorded: March 3, 1961
- Studio: Olmstead Studios, New York City
- Genre: Jazz, West Coast jazz, cool jazz, third stream, chamber jazz
- Label: Verve, reissued by ECM, 1992
- Producer: Creed Taylor

Jimmy Giuffre chronology
The Jimmy Giuffre Quartet in Person (1960)	Fusion (1961)	Thesis (1961)

Fusion is a 1961 album by the Jimmy Giuffre 3.

The trio on the recording was Giuffre's second drummerless group. He said at the time that the trio was “searching for a free sense of tonality and form”. The album title comes from Giuffre's sense that a meeting (fusion) of minds of the musicians was required in the free improvisation sections of the performances.

It was remastered, remixed and (partially) re-released by ECM in 1992 as a double-album with the trio's other 1961-Verve recording, Thesis (with three previously unissued tracks from the August sessions), substituting an alternate take of "Trudgin'" and omitting "Used To Be."

== Reception ==
Professional ratings
Review scores
Source	Rating
AllMusic	4/5 stars
DownBeat	3/5 stars

The contemporaneous DownBeat reviewer commented that the recording was dominated by Bley, not Giuffre, and concluded that it was "off the beaten track in exploring possibilities for this type of guided democracy in jazz". AllMusic awarded the album 4 stars stating "The debut recording by Jimmy Giuffre's new trio was as startling a new development in Giuffre's music as it was in jazz... The elegance and grace of this album didn't set the American jazz world on fire as Free Fall would the next year, but it did set up further textural and architectural possibilities for the trio's next album, Thesis".

== Track listing ==
1. "Scootin' About – 3:39
2. "Jesus Maria" (Carla Bley) – 6:17
3. "Emphasis" – 4:18
4. "In the Mornings Out There" (Carla Bley) – 6:54
5. "Cry, Want" – 5:13
6. "Trudgin'" – 4:02
7. "Used to Be'" – 3:58
8. "Brief Hesitation" – 4:19
9. "Venture" – 4:00

The original Verve mono LP included the complete take of "Used to Be," while the Verve stereo LP included a version that fades out at approximately 3:40.

Additional tracks on 1992 ECM reissue, in lieu of "Trudgin'" (original take) and "Used to Be" found on original release:

1. "Trudgin'" (alternate take) - 4:33
2. "Afternoon" – 5:15

Tracks released on 2016 Emanem Records CD release "Bremen & Stuttgart 1961":

1. "Trudgin'" (originally issued take) – 4:02
2. "Used to Be'" (stereo take edited to mono conclusion) – 3:58

All compositions by Jimmy Giuffre except as indicated.

== Personnel ==
- Jimmy Giuffre - clarinet
- Paul Bley - piano
- Steve Swallow - bass
