= 2010 Kobalt Tools 500 =

2010 Kobalt Tools 500 may refer to:

- 2010 Kobalt Tools 500 (Atlanta), held at Atlanta Motor Speedway in March 2010
- 2010 Kobalt Tools 500 (Phoenix), held at Phoenix International Raceway in November 2010
