= The Music Man (album) =

Studio album by Jimmy Giuffre
- Released: February 1958
- Recorded: December 31, 1957 and January 2, 3 & 6, 1958; Coastal Recording Studios, NYC
- Genre: Jazz
- Label: Atlantic; LP 1276
- Producer: Nesuhi Ertegun

Jimmy Giuffre chronology
The Jimmy Giuffre 3 (1956)	The Music Man (1958)	Trav'lin' Light (1958)

The Music Man (full title Jimmy Giuffre and his Music Men Play The Music Man) is an album by American jazz composer and arranger Jimmy Giuffre featuring tunes from Meredith Willson's 1957 Broadway musical, The Music Man which was released on the Atlantic label in February 1958.

== Reception ==
Professional ratings
Review scores
Source	Rating
Allmusic	4/5 stars

Scott Yanow of Allmusic states: "this particular set finds Giuffre (tripling as usual on clarinet, tenor and baritone) leading a somewhat conventional band, a seven-horn pianoless nonet. ...The arrangements (all by Giuffre) swing, the beauty and joy of the melodies are brought out, and the leader is in top form. A true rarity".

== Track listing ==
All compositions by Meredith Willson

1. "Iowa Stubborn" – 3:57
2. "Goodnight My Someone" – 2:45
3. "Seventy-Six Trombones" – 3:06
4. "Marian the Librarian" – 2:40
5. "My White Knight" – 3:31
6. "The Wells Fargo Wagon" – 4:02
7. "It's You" – 3:34
8. "Shipoopi" – 2:51
9. "Lida Rose (Will I Ever Tell You)" – 3:32
10. "Gary, Indiana" – 2:56
11. "Till There Was You" – 3:27
- Recorded at Coastal Recording Studios in New York City on December 31, 1957 (tracks 3 & 4), January 2, 1958 (tracks 2, 5 & 11), January 3, 1958 (tracks 6–8) and January 6, 1958 (tracks 1, 9 & 10)

== Personnel ==
- Jimmy Giuffre – clarinet, tenor saxophone, baritone saxophone
- Art Farmer, Bernie Glow, Phil Sunkel, Joe Wilder – trumpet
- Al Cohn, Eddie Wasserman – tenor saxophone
- Sol Schlinger – baritone saxophone
- Wendell Marshall – bass
- Ed Shaughnessy – drums
