= Dragonfly (Jimmy Giuffre album) =

Studio album by The Jimmy Giuffre 4
- Released: 1983
- Recorded: January 14 & 15, 1983; RBY Recording Studio, Southbury, CT
- Genre: Jazz
- Length: 38:06
- Label: Soul Note; SN 1058
- Producer: Giovanni Bonandrini

Jimmy Giuffre chronology
IAI Festival (1978)	Dragonfly (1983)	Quasar (1985)

Dragonfly is an album by American jazz composer and arranger Jimmy Giuffre which was released on the Italian Soul Note label in 1983.

== Reception ==
Professional ratings
Review scores
Source	Rating
Allmusic	3/5 stars

Ron Wynn of Allmusic states: "Giuffre enters the 80s with a bang".

== Track listing ==
All compositions by Jimmy Giuffre except as indicated

1. "Dragonfly" - 5:05
2. "Cool" - 5:45
3. "In Between" - 4:37
4. "Moonlight" - 4:40
5. "J to J" - 4:02
6. "Sad Truth" - 3:10
7. "Stella by Starlight" (Victor Young, Ned Washington) - 5:27
8. "Squirrels" - 5:20

== Personnel ==
- Jimmy Giuffre - soprano saxophone, tenor saxophone, clarinet, flute, bass flute
- Pete Levin - Rhodes electric piano, Oberheim synthesizer, Moog synthesizer
- Bob Nieske - electric bass
- Randy Kaye - percussion, marimba
