= IAI Festival =

Live album by Jimmy Giuffre/Lee Konitz/Bill Connors/Paul Bley
- Released: 1978
- Recorded: May 19, 1978; Great American Music Hall, San Francisco, CA
- Genre: Jazz
- Length: 36:03
- Label: Improvising Artists IAI 37.38.59
- Producer: Paul Bley

Jimmy Giuffre chronology
River Chant (1975)	IAI Festival (1978)	Dragonfly (1983)

IAI Festival (full title IAI Festival/Great American Music Hall/San Francisco) is a live album by multi-instrumentalist Jimmy Giuffre, saxophonist Lee Konitz, guitarist Bill Connors and pianist Paul Bley recorded in 1978 which was the final release on Bley's own Improvising Artists label.

== Reception ==
Professional ratings
Review scores
Source	Rating
AllMusic	4/5 stars

AllMusic awarded the album 4 stars noting it is "just 37 minutes of music, but it is definitely worth hearing".

== Track listing ==
No.	Title	Length
1.	"Blues in the Closet" (Oscar Pettiford)	5:12
2.	"The Sad Time" (Jimmy Giuffre, Lee Konitz)	2:34
3.	"Spanish Flames" (Giuffre, Bill Connors)	11:26
4.	"Enter, Ivory" (Giuffre, Paul Bley)	11:07
5.	"From Then to Then" (Giuffre, Konitz)	5:44

== Personnel ==
- Jimmy Giuffre – tenor saxophone (tracks 1 & 5), bass flute (track 2), clarinet (track 3), soprano saxophone (track 4), flute (track 4)
- Lee Konitz – alto saxophone (tracks 1, 2 & 5)
- Bill Connors – guitar (track 3)
- Paul Bley – piano (track 4)
