= The Jimmy Giuffre Clarinet =

Studio album by Jimmy Giuffre
- Released: 1956
- Recorded: March 21 & 22, 1956; Capitol Studios, Los Angeles, CA
- Genre: Jazz
- Length: 37:01
- Label: Atlantic; LP 1238
- Producer: Nesuhi Ertegun

Jimmy Giuffre chronology
| Tangents in Jazz (1955) | The Jimmy Giuffre Clarinet (1956) | The Jimmy Giuffre 3 (1957) |

The Jimmy Giuffre Clarinet is an album by American jazz composer and arranger Jimmy Giuffre featuring him exclusively on clarinet which was released on the Atlantic label in 1956.

== Reception ==
Professional ratings
Review scores
| Source | Rating |
|---|---|
| Allmusic | 3/5 stars |
| The Penguin Guide to Jazz Recordings | 4/4 stars |

Scott Yanow of Allmusic states: "This continually interesting set finds Jimmy Giuffre sticking exclusively to his cool-toned clarinet, mostly playing in the lower register, in several settings. The thought-provoking and generally relaxed works feature a wide variety of instrumentation".

== Track listing ==
All compositions by Jimmy Giuffre except as indicated

1. "So Low" - 2:48
2. "Deep Purple" (Peter DeRose, Mitchell Parish) - 4:38
3. "The Side Pipers" - 5:07
4. "My Funny Valentine" (Richard Rodgers, Lorenz Hart) - 5:03
5. "Quiet Cook" - 4:18
6. "The Sheepherder" - 5:23
7. "Fascinating Rhythm" (George Gershwin, Ira Gershwin) - 4:04
8. "Down Home" - 5:40
- Recorded at Capitol Studios in Los Angeles, CA on March 21, 1956 (tracks 1, 4, 5 & 8) and March 22, 1956 (tracks 2, 3, 6 & 7)

== Personnel ==
- Jimmy Giuffre - clarinet
- Bud Shank - alto flute (track 3)
- Buddy Collette - alto clarinet, flute (tracks 3 & 6)
- Harry Klee - bass clarinet, bass flute (tracks 3 & 6)
- Harry Edison, Shorty Rogers, Jack Sheldon - trumpet (track 8)
- Bob Cooper - tenor saxophone, oboe (tracks 4 & 8)
- Dave Pell - tenor saxophone, English horn (tracks 4 & 8)
- Marty Berman - baritone saxophone, bassoon (tracks 4 & 8)
- Jimmy Rowles - piano, celeste (tracks 2 & 7)
- Ralph Peña - bass (tracks 4, 5 & 8)
- Stan Levey (tracks 5 & 8), Shelly Manne (tracks 3 & 7) - drums
