= Thesis (Jimmy Giuffre 3 album) =

Studio album by Jimmy Giuffre
- Released: 1961
- Recorded: August 4, 1961
- Genre: Jazz, West Coast jazz, cool jazz, third stream, chamber jazz
- Length: 34:31
- Label: Verve
- Producer: Creed Taylor, reissue: Manfred Eicher and Jean-Philippe Allard

Jimmy Giuffre chronology
Fusion (1961)	Thesis (1961)	Emphasis, Stuttgart 1961 (1961)

Professional ratings
Review scores
Source	Rating
Allmusic	4/5 stars
Down Beat	4/5 stars

Thesis is a 1961 album by the Jimmy Giuffre 3.

The trio on the recording was Giuffre's second drummerless group. He said at the time that the trio was "searching for a free sense of tonality and form".

It was remastered, remixed and re-released by ECM in 1992 as a double-album with the trio's other 1961 Verve recording, Fusion (with three previously unissued tracks from the August sessions).

== Track listing ==
1. "Ictus" (Carla Bley) - 2:44
2. "That's True, That's True" - 4:41
3. "Sonic" - 4:44
4. "Whirrrr" - 4:54
5. "Carla" (Paul Bley) - 4:35
6. "Goodbye" (Gordon Jenkins) - 4:56
7. "Flight" - 3:21
8. "The Gamut" - 4:37

Additional tracks on 1992 ECM reissue:

1. "Me Too" - 5:03
2. "Temporarily" (Carla Bley) - 6:09
3. "Herb & Ictus" - 0:44

All compositions by Jimmy Giuffre, except as otherwise noted.

== Personnel ==
- Jimmy Giuffre - clarinet
- Paul Bley - piano
- Steve Swallow - bass
