= 7 Pieces =

Studio album by The Jimmy Giuffre 3
- Released: 1959
- Recorded: February 23 & 25 and March 2, 1959; Los Angeles, CA
- Genre: Jazz
- Label: Verve; MGV 8307

Jimmy Giuffre chronology
Ad Lib (1959)	7 Pieces (1959)	Herb Ellis Meets Jimmy Giuffre (1959)

7 Pieces is an album by American jazz composer and arranger Jimmy Giuffre which was released on the Verve label in 1959.

== Reception ==
Professional ratings
Review scores
Source	Rating
AllMusic	3/5 stars

Ken Dryden of Allmusic states:

Giuffre switches off between clarinet, tenor sax, and baritone sax between pieces, all of which are spacious while never venturing so far out as to lose the listener's attention... any fan of Jimmy Giuffre's unique blend of cool jazz should snap up this record without hesitation the moment it is found.

— Dryden, Ken. Seven Pieces – Review at AllMusic. Retrieved July 6, 2015.

== Track listing ==
All compositions by Jimmy Giuffre

1. "Happy Man" - 7:12
2. "Lovely Willow" - 9:19
3. "Song of the Wind" - 5:52
4. "Princess" - 4:17
5. "The Story" - 7:04
6. "The Little Melody" - 7:28
7. "Time Machine" - 4:38

== Personnel ==
- Jimmy Giuffre - clarinet, tenor saxophone, baritone saxophone
- Jim Hall - guitar
- Red Mitchell - bass
