= Piece for Clarinet and String Orchestra/Mobiles =

Studio album by Jimmy Giuffre
- Released: 1960
- Recorded: March 1960; Baden-Baden, West Germany
- Genre: Jazz, Classical music
- Label: Verve; MGV 8395

Jimmy Giuffre chronology
The Easy Way (1959)	Piece for Clarinet and String Orchestra/Mobiles (1960)	The Jimmy Giuffre Quartet in Person (1960)

Piece for Clarinet and String Orchestra/Mobiles is an album by American jazz composer and arranger Jimmy Giuffre which was released on the Verve label in 1960.

== Critical reception ==
Professional ratings
Review scores
Source	Rating
Allmusic	3/5 stars

Allmusic awarded the album 3 stars.

== Track listing ==
All compositions by Jimmy Giuffre.

1. "Piece for Clarinet and String Orchestra"
  1. "Movement 1" - 6:22
  2. "Movement 2" - 4:05
  3. "Movement 3" - 2:40
  4. "Movement 4" - 2:35
  5. "Movement 5" - 2:05
2. "Mobiles"
  1. "Movement 1" - 1:00
  2. "Movement 2" - 1:32
  3. "Movement 3" - 0:45
  4. "Movement 4" - 1:28
  5. "Movement 5" - 2:08
  6. "Movement 6" - 0:50
  7. "Movement 7" - 2:17
  8. "Movement 8" - 0:23
  9. "Movement 9" - 1:58
  10. "Movement 10" - 0:38
  11. "Movement 11" - 0:51
  12. "Movement 12" - 0:32
  13. "Movement 13" - 1:47
  14. "Movement 14" - 1:03
  15. "Movement 15" - 1:14
  16. "Movement 16" - 0:58

== Personnel ==
- Jimmy Giuffre - clarinet
- The Südwestfunk Orchestra of Baden-Baden conducted by Wolfram Röhrig
