= Ad Lib (album) =

Studio album by The Jimmy Giuffre 4
- Released: 1960
- Recorded: January 1959; Los Angeles, CA
- Genre: Jazz
- Label: Verve; MGV 8361

Jimmy Giuffre chronology
| Western Suite (1958) | Ad Lib (1960) | 7 Pieces (1959) |

Ad Lib is an album by American jazz composer and arranger Jimmy Giuffre which was released on the Verve label in 1960.

== Reception ==
Professional ratings
Review scores
| Source | Rating |
|---|---|
| Allmusic | 3/5 stars |

Allmusic awarded the album 3 stars.

== Track listing ==
All compositions by Jimmy Giuffre except as indicated

1. "I Got Those Blues" – 9:02
2. "I'm Old Fashioned" (Jerome Kern, Johnny Mercer) – 8:36
3. "I Hear Red" – 8:18
4. "The Boy Next Door" (Ralph Blane, Hugh Martin) – 7:32
5. "Stella by Starlight" (Victor Young, Ned Washington) – 8:54
6. "Problems" – 8:11

== Personnel ==
- Jimmy Giuffre – clarinet, tenor saxophone, baritone saxophone
- Jimmy Rowles – piano
- Red Mitchell – bass
- Lawrence Marable – drums
