= Jimmy Giuffre (album) =

Studio album by Jimmy Giuffre
- Released: 1955
- Recorded: February 19, 1954, April 15, 1954 and January 31, 1955; Capitol Studios, Los Angeles, CA
- Genre: Jazz
- Label: Capitol; T 549

Jimmy Giuffre chronology
Jimmy Giuffre (1955)	Tangents in Jazz (1955)

Jimmy Giuffre (also released as Four Brothers) is the debut album by American jazz clarinet and saxophone player, composer and arranger Jimmy Giuffre. It was released on the Capitol label initially in 10-inch LP format in 1954 with seven tracks, and an expanded 12-inch LP version with 10 tracks was released in 1955.

== Reception ==
Professional ratings
Review scores
Source	Rating
Allmusic	3/5 stars
The Penguin Guide to Jazz Recordings	3/4 stars

Scott Yanow of Allmusic stated, "The leader wrote eight of the ten songs (including a remake of his biggest hit 'Four Brothers'), several of which show off his growing interest in both folk and classical musics. Fine performances, but this album will be difficult to find".

== Track listing ==
All compositions by Jimmy Giuffre except as indicated

1. "Four Brothers" - 3:12
2. "Someone to Watch Over Me" (George Gershwin, Ira Gershwin) - 3:07
3. "Sultana" - 2:50
4. "A Ring-Tail Monkey" - 2:32
5. "Nutty Pine" - 3:10
6. "Wrought of Iron" - 2:47
7. "Do It" - 3:14
8. "All for You" - 2:46
9. "Iranic" - 4:46
10. "I Only Have Eyes for You" (Harry Warren, Al Dubin) - 6:13
- Recorded at Capitol Studios in Los Angeles, CA on February 19, 1954 (tracks 7, 8 & 10), April 15, 1954 (tracks 1, 3, 5 & 6) and January 31, 1955 (tracks 2, 4 & 9)

== Personnel ==
- Jimmy Giuffre - clarinet, tenor saxophone, baritone saxophone
- Bud Shank - alto saxophone (tracks 1, 3, 5 & 6)
- Jack Sheldon - trumpet
- Shorty Rogers - flugelhorn (tracks 1, 3, 5 & 6)
- Bob Enevoldsen - valve trombone, bass (tracks 1, 3, 5 & 6)
- Russ Freeman - piano (tracks 7, 8 & 10)
- Curtis Counce (tracks 7, 8 & 10), Ralph Peña (tracks 1–6 & 9) - bass
- Artie Anton (tracks 2, 4 & 9), Shelly Manne (tracks 1, 3, 5–8 & 10) - drums
