= River Chant =

Studio album by Jimmy Giuffre Three
- Released: 1975
- Recorded: April 25, 1975
- Studio: Macdonald Studio, Sea Cliff, NY
- Genre: Jazz
- Length: 43:02
- Label: Choice; CRS 1011
- Producer: Gerry Macdonald

Jimmy Giuffre chronology
Music for People, Birds, Butterflies and Mosquitoes (1972)	River Chant (1975)	IAI Festival (1978)

River Chant is an album by American jazz composer and arranger Jimmy Giuffre which was released on the Choice label in 1975.

== Reception ==
Professional ratings
Review scores
Source	Rating
Allmusic	2/5 stars

Allmusic awarded the album 2 stars.

== Track listing ==
All compositions by Jimmy Giuffre

1. "Tree People" - 5:53
2. "Elephant" - 5:45
3. "Tibetan Sun" - 4:12
4. "The Train and the River" - 5:40
5. "The Tide Is In" - 3:45
6. "River Chant" - 4:03
7. "Om" - 4:40
8. "The Listening" - 4:35
9. "Celebration" - 4:33

== Personnel ==
- Jimmy Giuffre - tenor saxophone, clarinet, flute, bass flute
- Kiyoshi Tokunaga - bass
- Randy Kaye - percussion
