= Tangents in Jazz =

Studio album by Jimmy Giuffre
- Released: 1956
- Recorded: June 6, 7 & 10, 1955; Capitol Studios, Los Angeles, CA
- Genre: Jazz
- Label: Capitol; T 634

Jimmy Giuffre chronology
Jimmy Giuffre (1955)	Tangents in Jazz (1956)	The Jimmy Giuffre Clarinet (1956)

Tangents in Jazz is the second album by American jazz clarinet and saxophone player, composer and arranger Jimmy Giuffre which was released on the Capitol label in 1956.

== Reception ==
Professional ratings
Review scores
Source	Rating
Allmusic	3/5 stars
The Penguin Guide to Jazz Recordings	3/4 stars

Scott Yanow of Allmusic stated, "The music (all but one of the ten numbers are by Giuffre) puts an emphasis on cool tones and relaxed improvising, hinting at folk themes but sounding quite modern for the time".

== Track listing ==
All compositions by Jimmy Giuffre except as indicated

1. "Scintilla I" - 0:53
2. "Finger Snapper" - 2:34
3. "Lazy Tones" - 4:10
4. "Scintilla II" - 2:27
5. "Chirpin' Time" - 5:47
6. "This Is My Beloved" (Vernon Duke) - 3:30 (Vernon Duke)
7. "The Leprechaun" - 6:34
8. "Scintilla III" - 1:37
9. "Rhetoric" - 3:24
10. "Scintilla IV" - 2:52
- Recorded at Capitol Studios in Los Angeles, CA on June 6, 1955 (tracks 4–6), June 7, 1955 (tracks 1, 3 & 10) and June 10, 1955 (tracks 2 & 7–9)

== Personnel ==
- Jimmy Giuffre - clarinet, tenor saxophone, baritone saxophone
- Jack Sheldon - trumpet
- Ralph Peña - bass
- Artie Anton - drums
