= Quasar (album) =

Studio album by The Jimmy Giuffre 4
- Released: 1985
- Recorded: May 3 & 5, 1985; RBY Recording Studio, Southbury, CT
- Genre: Jazz
- Length: 39:11
- Label: Soul Note; SN 1108
- Producer: Giovanni Bonandrini

Jimmy Giuffre chronology
Dragonfly (1983)	Quasar (1985)	Eiffel: Live in Paris (1985)

Quasar is an album by American jazz composer and arranger Jimmy Giuffre which was released on the Italian Soul Note label in 1985.

== Reception ==
Professional ratings
Review scores
Source	Rating
Allmusic	3/5 stars
The Penguin Guide to Jazz Recordings	3/4 stars

Scott Yanow of Allmusic states: "Giuffre is heard on clarinet, tenor, soprano, flute and bass flute on eight obscure pieces, including four of his originals. Although often electronic, the music has the typical thoughtfulness of Giuffre's relaxed approach and some picturesque moments".

== Track listing ==
All compositions by Jimmy Giuffre except as indicated

1. "Quasar" (Juanita Odjenar Giuffre) – 5:22
2. "Frog Legs" – 5:14
3. "Phantom" – 4:58
4. "Spirits" – 3:22
5. "Wolf Soup" (Bob Nieske) – 4:09
6. "Shadows" – 3:38
7. "2nd Step" (Juanita Odjenar Giuffre) – 5:42
8. "Night Ride" (Pete Levin) – 6:46

== Personnel ==
- Jimmy Giuffre – soprano saxophone, tenor saxophone, clarinet, flute, bass flute
- Pete Levin – keyboards
- Bob Nieske – bass
- Randy Kaye – drums
