= 2010 Kobalt Tools 500 (Phoenix) =

Race details
- Race 35 of 36 in the 2010 NASCAR Sprint Cup Series
- Date: November 14, 2010
- Location: Phoenix International Raceway in Avondale, Arizona, US
- Course: Permanent racing facility
- Course length: 1 miles (1.6 km)
- Distance: 312 laps, 312 mi (502 km)
- Weather: Sunny with a high around 72; wind out of the NNE at 6 mph.
- Average speed: 116 miles per hour (187 km/h)

Pole position
Driver	Carl Edwards	Roush Fenway Racing
- Time: 26.395

Most laps led
Driver	Denny Hamlin	Joe Gibbs Racing
- Laps: 190

Winner
No. 99	Carl Edwards	Roush Fenway Racing

Television in the United States
- Network: ESPN
- Announcers: Marty Reid, Dale Jarrett and Andy Petree

The 2010 Kobalt Tools 500 was a NASCAR Sprint Cup Series race that was held on November 14, 2010, at Phoenix International Raceway in Avondale, Arizona, United States. Contested over 312 laps, it was the thirty-fifth, and the ninth race in the Chase for the Sprint Cup during the 2010 NASCAR Sprint Cup Series season. The race was won by Carl Edwards, for the Roush Fenway Racing team. Ryan Newman finished second, and Joey Logano clinched third.

Pole position driver Edwards maintained his lead on the first lap to begin the race, as Newman, who started in the second position on the grid, remained behind him. On the seventh lap, Kurt Busch became the leader of the race. Hamlin, the points leader before the race, led the most laps with a total of 190. On lap 298, Hamlin made a pit stop and became a lap behind. He didn't return to the first ten positions afterward. Edwards maintained the lead to win the race.

There were five cautions and 14 lead changes among six different drivers throughout the course of the race. It was Edwards' first win in the 2010 season, and the 18th of his career. The result kept Edwards in fourth in the Drivers' Championship, 264 points behind Denny Hamlin and 47 ahead of Matt Kenseth. Chevrolet maintained its lead in the Manufacturers' Championship, 42 points ahead of Toyota and 88 ahead of Ford, with one race remaining in the season. A total of 75,000 people attended the race, while 4.201 million watched it on television.

== Report ==
=== Background ===
Phoenix International Raceway, the race track where the race was held

Phoenix International Raceway is one of five short tracks to hold NASCAR races. The standard track at Phoenix International Raceway is a four-turn short track oval that is 1 mile (1.6 km) long. The track's turns were banked at 11 degrees, while the front stretch, the location of the finish line, was banked at three degrees. The back stretch, which has a dogleg shape instead of a straight, has 9 degrees of banking. The racetrack has seats for 76,800 spectators.

Before the race, Denny Hamlin led the Drivers' Championship with 6,325 points, and Jimmie Johnson stood in second with 6,292 points. Kevin Harvick followed in third with 6,266 points, 258 ahead of Carl Edwards and 266 ahead of Matt Kenseth in fourth and fifth. Jeff Gordon with 5,994 was eight points ahead of Kyle Busch, as Tony Stewart with 5,962 points, was nine ahead of Greg Biffle, and thirty-four in front of Clint Bowyer. Kurt Busch and Jeff Burton were eleventh and twelfth with 5,890 and 5,852 points. In the Manufacturers' Championship, Chevrolet was leading with 249 points, forty points ahead of their rival Toyota. Ford, with 158 points, was twenty-six points ahead of Dodge in the battle for third. Johnson was the race's defending champion.

=== Practice and qualifying ===
Three practice sessions were held before the Sunday race — one on Friday, and two on Saturday. The first session lasted 90 minutes, while the second session lasted 45 minutes. The third and final practice session lasted 60 minutes. During the first practice session, Edwards, for the Roush Fenway Racing team, was quickest ahead of Regan Smith in second and Stewart in the third position. Kyle Busch was scored fourth, and Brad Keselowski managed fifth. Juan Pablo Montoya, Kurt Busch, A. J. Allmendinger, Ryan Newman, and Harvick rounded out the top ten quickest drivers in the session.

Afterward, during qualifying, forty-six cars were entered, but only forty-three were able to race because of NASCAR's qualifying procedure. Edwards clinched his seventh pole position during his career, with a time of 26.395, which made a new track record. He was joined on the front row of the grid by Allmendinger. Kurt Busch qualified third, Biffle took fourth, and Jamie McMurray started fifth. Hamlin, one of the drivers in the Chase for the Sprint Cup, qualified seventeenth, while Johnson was scored twenty-first. The three drivers that failed to qualify for the race were Joe Nemechek, Michael McDowell, and Jason Leffler. Once the qualifying session completed, Edwards commented, "The first thing that we’re going to have an advantage Sunday is with our pit stall, that’s going to help us a lot. I think we have an advantage because [the title rivals] have to be a little bit conservative. Guys like myself we’re really battling for fourth in points and battling for wins. We can go out and be a little more aggressive and maybe take advantage of that."

On the next evening, Edwards remained quickest, ahead of Kurt Busch and Gordon in second and third. Kenseth was fourth quickest, and Burton took fifth. Montoya, Dale Earnhardt Jr., Joey Logano, Biffle, and Harvick followed in the top-ten. Other drivers in the chase, such as Hamlin, was fifteenth, and Johnson, who was seventeenth. During the third, and final practice session, Edwards, with a fastest time of 27.202, was quickest. Earnhardt Jr. and Gordon followed in second and third with times of 27.328 and 27.337 seconds. Hamlin managed to be fourth fastest, ahead of Harvick and Logano. Johnson was scored seventh, Mark Martin took eighth, David Reutimann was ninth, and Biffle took tenth.

=== Race ===
The race, the thirty-fifth out of a total of thirty-six in the season, began at 3:00 p.m. EST and was televised live in the United States on ESPN. Prior to the race, weather conditions were dry with the air temperature around 63 °F (17 °C). Ken Bowers, chaplain of the race track, began pre-race ceremonies with the invocation. Dr. Jesse McGuire performed the national anthem on his trumpet, and Steve Schultz, regional vice-president of Lowe's, gave the command for drivers to start their engines.

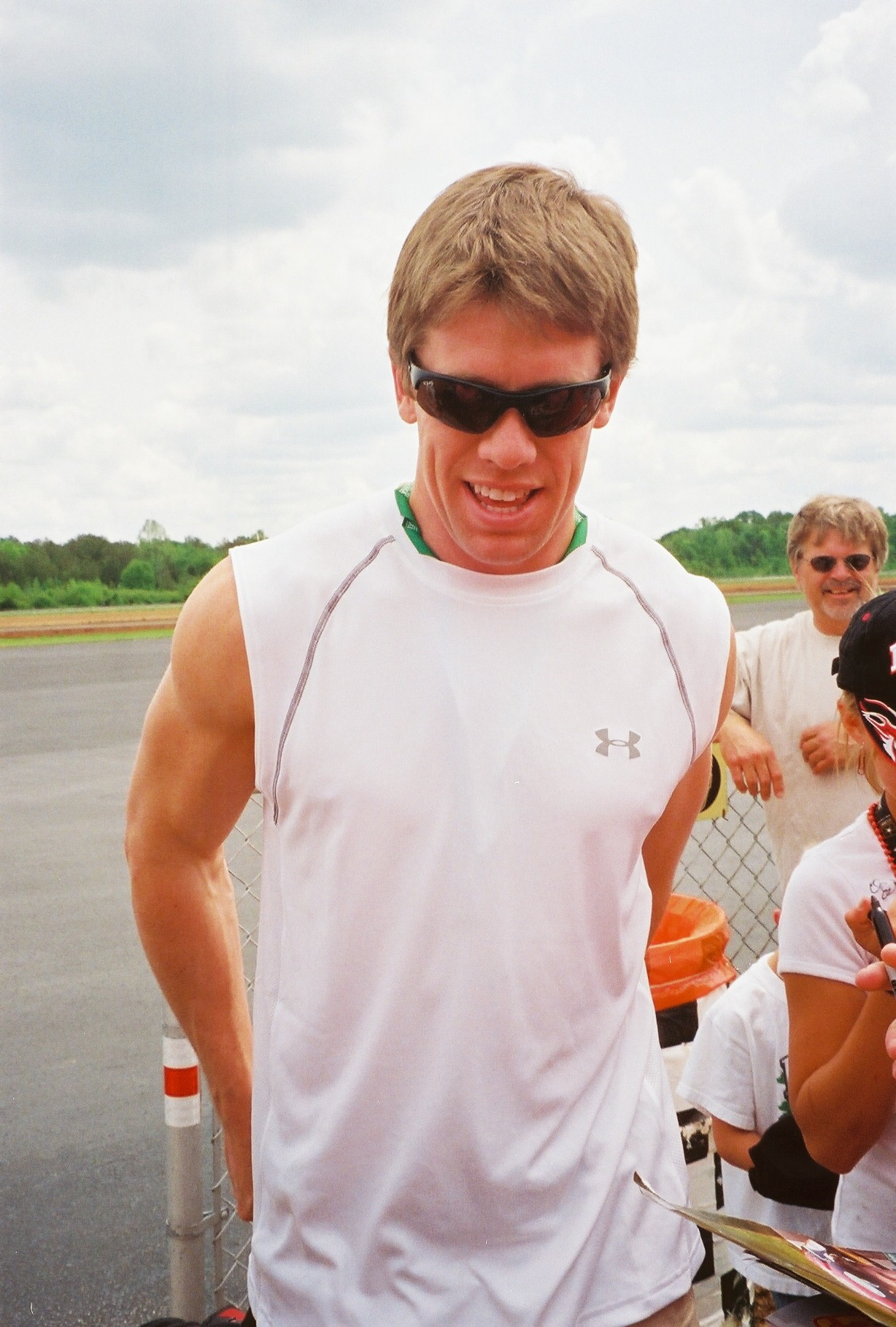
Carl Edwards won the pole position and the race.

Edwards retained the lead from the pole position throughout the beginning lap. On the second lap, Brendan Gaughan collided into the wall, prompting the first caution to be given. On the lap six restart, Edwards remained the leader. On the following lap, Kurt Busch passed Edwards to become the leader. On lap 7, Biffle had fallen two positions as David Reutimann overtook him. Three laps later, Johnson moved up to the 13th position. By the fourteenth lap, Harvick had moved up eight positions since the beginning of the race. Harvick continued to move forward while Busch maintained the lead. On lap 28, Edwards claimed the first position from Busch. By the 30th lap, Hamlin moved up to fifth on the grid after passing Reutimann. The next lap, Kyle Busch, Kurt's younger brother, hit the wall, but sustained minor damages. On lap 41, Hamlin moved up to third as Edwards maintained a 1.5-second lead. Three laps later, Hamlin passed Kurt Busch to claim second.

Kyle Busch moved up to fourth after passing Allmendinger on lap 54. After 55 laps, Stewart had moved up to eighth while Johnson had moved up to 12th. Three laps later, the second caution was given, after Keselowski developed a flat tire and crashed into the wall. All the front-runners made pit stops during the caution, with most asking for tires and adjustments. At the lap 65 restart, Edwards remained the leader before Hamlin moved past him on the following lap. On the 67th lap, Kurt Busch passed Edwards, moving him down to third. During lap 69, Kenseth passed Busch to move to fifth. Two laps later, Johnson was scored ninth, while Harvick was 12th. Afterward, Kyle Busch fell to the eighth position by the 73rd lap. Stewart moved up to the eighth position three laps later while Hamlin had a lead of 1.3 seconds.

On lap 80, McMurray scraped the wall, sustaining damage to the rear spoiler, which came loose from the rest of the car. Two laps later, McMurray's teammate Montoya moved up to the 14th position after starting 35th. On the 86th lap, Johnson passed Kenseth to move up to the eighth position. Kenseth fell two positions after being passed by Allmendinger and Harvick. By lap 90, Hamlin extended his lead to 2.3 seconds ahead of Kurt Busch. One lap later, Gordon passed Kenseth to move to the 12th position. During the 96th lap, Stewart moved up to fourth after passing Martin Truex Jr. Montoya moved up to 13th on the following lap after passing Biffle. On lap 101, the third caution was given for debris. One lap later, the front runners made pit stops, giving the lead to Bobby Labonte, who didn't come in until the next lap. At the lap 105 restart, Edwards was the leader before Hamlin reclaimed the first position a lap later.

During the 117th lap, Biffle moved up to the eighth position, two laps before Johnson moved up to fifth after overtaking Newman. By lap 123, Hamlin's lead was around eight-tenths of a second ahead of Edwards. Six laps later, Stewart passed his teammate Newman for the sixth position. On the following lap, Hamlin had over a one-second lead over second-placed Edwards. On the 131st lap, Kyle Busch passed his brother Kurt for the second position. Harvick passed Biffle to take over the eighth position six laps later. On lap 140, Kurt Busch fell down to fifth after Johnson passed him. Three laps later, Kurt fell one more position to sixth once Newman overtook him. During lap 147, Truex. passed Biffle for the ninth position. Kenseth passed Biffle four laps later to claim the tenth position.

On lap 156, Truex moved into eighth, after overtaking Kurt Busch. By lap 159, Hamlin had a 2.5-second lead over Edwards in the second position. Three laps later, Kenseth moved up to ninth while Kyle Busch moved to second after passing Edwards. On lap 166, green flag pit stops began as Paul Menard made a pit stop. On the following lap, Elliott Sadler made a pit stop, four laps earlier than Hamlin. During the pit stops, three drivers were able to lead the race, Hamlin, Kyle Busch, and Kenseth. Once the pit stops concluded, Hamlin was scored the leader. On lap 180, Kyle Busch moved up to the second position after passing Edwards. Six laps later, Mark Martin passed Kurt Busch to move into 13th. By lap 192, Hamlin had a 1.5 second lead over his teammate Kyle Busch. Six laps later, Harvick overtook Johnson to claim the fourth position. At lap 210, Stewart passed Johnson for the fifth position as Jeff Burton moved up to the seventh.

Afterward, Stewart passed Harvick for the fourth position on the 219th lap. Three laps later, Robby Gordon spun sideways, prompting the fourth caution to be given. All the front runners made pit stops during the caution, and Kyle Busch became the leader. At the lap 228 restart, Kyle Busch was first ahead of Hamlin, Edwards, Johnson, and Burton. On the following lap, Hamlin passed Busch for the first position. During the 231st lap, Edwards passed Busch to take over the second position, making Busch fall to third after two laps. Two laps later, the fifth caution was given because Travis Kvapil spun sideways. During the caution, the first eight cars did not pit, while the others did. Hamlin led on the restart ahead of Carl Edwards in second. At lap 242, Kurt Busch moved up to ninth, after passing Stewart. Three laps later, Stewart fell to 12th, after being passed by Martin and Logano. By lap 249, Hamlin had a 0.75 second lead over second. On lap 252, Jeff Burton moved up to the seventh position.

Fourteen laps later, Edwards reclaimed the lead from Hamlin. On lap 268, Montoya moved up to fourth after passing Johnson. By lap 274, Edwards had a one-second lead over Hamlin in second. On the following lap, Newman passed Johnson for fifth as Harvick moved to twelfth. Edwards continued to expand his lead to two seconds on lap 287. At the 292nd lap, Johnson fell to sixth after being passed by Burton. Six laps later, Hamlin made a pit stop for fuel and two new tires, which caused him to fall to nineteenth. On lap 301, Hamlin moved back on the lead lap, after passing Edwards. Logano passed Johnson for fourth as Burton made a pit stop on lap 303. With six laps remaining, Johnson fell to sixth as Harvick moved to seventh. Edwards maintained the lead to win his first race of the 2010 season. Newman finished second, ahead of Logano in third and Biffle in fourth. Johnson clinched the fifth position, after starting twenty-first.

=== Post-race ===
Race winner Carl Edwards appeared in victory lane after his victory lap to start celebrating his first win of the season, in front of a crowd of 75,000 people. After winning the race, he described his happiness saying, "A win is very important to us. It's a very big accomplishment for us." He continued, "I think it's something that we needed for our confidence. We needed it as a payoff for all the hard work the guys have put in at the shop, the engine department."

Hamlin, who led the most laps, described his frustration: "The strategy and what-not at the end just didn't work our way. That's all I can ask for, is to have the better car than those two guys – and we did. But, unfortunately, the strategy bit us. We're just going to have to go there and do it the old-fashioned way next week and try to beat them on the race track." Afterward, Newman, who finished second, commented, "We were saving fuel the whole time. Made more sense to save fuel. We were two laps short. We just did what I thought we needed to do. If Carl made it, Carl made it." Fifth place finisher Johnson described his happiness by saying: "We're going to go home and we're going to make sure we have the best engines, go through our simulation stuff, make sure our car is as fast as it can be and then race. We were in a good situation and could take the risk, take the chance. It worked out for us.

In the Drivers' Championship, Hamlin remained first with 6,462 points, 15 ahead of Johnson in second. Harvick followed in third with 6,416 points. Edwards and Kenseth rounded out the first five positions with 6,198 and 6,151. In the Manufacturers' Championship, Chevrolet maintained first place with 255 points, 42 ahead of Toyota and 88 ahead of Ford. Dodge remained fourth with 135 points. 4.201 million people watched the race on television. The race took two hours, forty-nine minutes and one second to complete, and the margin of victory was 4.770 seconds.

== Results ==
=== Qualifying ===
Grid	Car	Driver	Team	Manufacturer	Time	Speed
1	99	Carl Edwards	Roush Fenway Racing	Ford	26.395	136.389
2	43	A. J. Allmendinger	Richard Petty Motorsports	Ford	26.422	136.250
3	2	Kurt Busch	Penske Racing	Dodge	26.424	136.240
4	16	Greg Biffle	Roush Fenway Racing	Ford	26.521	135.742
5	1	Jamie McMurray	Earnhardt Ganassi Racing	Chevrolet	26.536	135.665
6	00	David Reutimann	Michael Waltrip Racing	Toyota	26.559	135.547
7	18	Kyle Busch	Joe Gibbs Racing	Toyota	26.563	135.527
8	78	Regan Smith	Furniture Row Racing	Chevrolet	26.607	135.303
9	9	Aric Almirola	Richard Petty Motorsports	Ford	26.622	135.227
10	20	Joey Logano	Joe Gibbs Racing	Toyota	26.626	135.206
11	56	Martin Truex Jr.	Michael Waltrip Racing	Toyota	26.626	135.206
12	6	David Ragan	Roush Fenway Racing	Ford	26.632	135.176
13	47	Marcos Ambrose	JTG Daugherty Racing	Toyota	26.637	135.150
14	33	Clint Bowyer	Richard Childress Racing	Chevrolet	26.649	135.089
15	17	Matt Kenseth	Roush Fenway Racing	Ford	26.650	135.084
16	77	Sam Hornish Jr.	Penske Racing	Dodge	26.659	135.039
17	11	Denny Hamlin	Joe Gibbs Racing	Toyota	26.679	134.938
18	98	Paul Menard	Richard Petty Motorsports	Ford	26.683	134.917
19	39	Ryan Newman	Stewart–Haas Racing	Chevrolet	26.683	134.917
20	14	Tony Stewart	Stewart–Haas Racing	Chevrolet	26.702	134.821
21	48	Jimmie Johnson	Hendrick Motorsports	Chevrolet	26.703	134.816
22	24	Jeff Gordon	Hendrick Motorsports	Chevrolet	26.706	134.801
23	19	Elliott Sadler	Richard Petty Motorsports	Ford	26.706	134.801
24	13	Casey Mears	Germain Racing	Toyota	26.713	134.766
25	83	Kasey Kahne	Red Bull Racing Team	Toyota	26.715	134.756
26	09	Bobby Labonte	Phoenix Racing	Chevrolet	26.767	134.494
27	82	Scott Speed	Red Bull Racing Team	Toyota	26.780	134.429
28	5	Mark Martin	Hendrick Motorsports	Chevrolet	26.787	134.393
29	29	Kevin Harvick	Richard Childress Racing	Chevrolet	26.795	134.353
30	12	Brad Keselowski	Penske Racing	Dodge	26.811	134.273
31	88	Dale Earnhardt Jr.	Hendrick Motorsports	Chevrolet	26.833	134.163
32	36	Dave Blaney	Tommy Baldwin Racing	Chevrolet	26.863	134.013
33	26	J. J. Yeley	Latitude 43 Motorsports	Ford	26.877	133.943
34	7	Robby Gordon	Robby Gordon Motorsports	Toyota	26.936	133.650
35	42	Juan Pablo Montoya	Earnhardt Ganassi Racing	Chevrolet	26.941	133.625
36	55	Mike Bliss	Prism Motorsports	Toyota	26.944	133.611
37	37	David Gilliland	Front Row Motorsports	Ford	26.968	133.492
38	38	Travis Kvapil	Front Row Motorsports	Ford	26.990	133.383
39	64	Landon Cassill	Max Q Motorsports	Toyota	26.998	133.343
40	31	Jeff Burton	Richard Childress Racing	Chevrolet	27.003	133.318
41	71	Brendan Gaughan	TRG Motorsports	Chevrolet	27.232	132.197
42	34	Tony Raines	Front Row Motorsports	Ford	27.494	130.938
43	81	Terry Labonte	Whitney Motorsports	Dodge	Champions' Provisional	
Failed to Qualify
44	66	Jason Leffler	Prism Motorsports	Toyota	27.008	133.294
45	87	Joe Nemechek	NEMCO Motorsports	Toyota	27.022	133.225
46	46	Michael McDowell	Whitney Motorsports	Chevrolet	27.046	133.107

=== Race results ===
Pos	Car	Driver	Team	Manufacturer	Laps run	Points
1	99	Carl Edwards	Roush Fenway Racing	Ford	312	190^{1}
2	39	Ryan Newman	Stewart–Haas Racing	Chevrolet	312	170
3	20	Joey Logano	Joe Gibbs Racing	Toyota	312	165
4	16	Greg Biffle	Roush Fenway Racing	Ford	312	160
5	48	Jimmie Johnson	Hendrick Motorsports	Chevrolet	312	155
6	29	Kevin Harvick	Richard Childress Racing	Chevrolet	312	150
7	17	Matt Kenseth	Roush Fenway Racing	Ford	312	151^{1}
8	5	Mark Martin	Hendrick Motorsports	Chevrolet	312	142
9	2	Kurt Busch	Penske Racing	Dodge	312	143^{1}
10	1	Jamie McMurray	Earnhardt Ganassi Racing	Chevrolet	312	134
11	24	Jeff Gordon	Hendrick Motorsports	Chevrolet	312	130
12	11	Denny Hamlin	Joe Gibbs Racing	Toyota	312	137^{2}
13	18	Kyle Busch	Joe Gibbs Racing	Toyota	312	129^{1}
14	88	Dale Earnhardt Jr.	Hendrick Motorsports	Chevrolet	312	121
15	56	Martin Truex Jr.	Michael Waltrip Racing	Toyota	312	118
16	42	Juan Pablo Montoya	Earnhardt Ganassi Racing	Chevrolet	312	115
17	14	Tony Stewart	Stewart–Haas Racing	Chevrolet	312	112
18	43	A. J. Allmendinger	Richard Petty Motorsports	Ford	312	109
19	31	Jeff Burton	Richard Childress Racing	Chevrolet	312	106
20	09	Bobby Labonte	Phoenix Racing	Chevrolet	311	108^{1}
21	33	Clint Bowyer	Richard Childress Racing	Chevrolet	311	100
22	47	Marcos Ambrose	JTG Daugherty Racing	Toyota	311	97
23	78	Regan Smith	Furniture Row Racing	Chevrolet	311	94
24	13	Casey Mears	Germain Racing	Toyota	311	91
25	6	David Ragan	Roush Fenway Racing	Ford	310	88
26	00	David Reutimann	Michael Waltrip Racing	Toyota	310	85
27	9	Aric Almirola	Richard Petty Motorsports	Ford	310	82
28	19	Elliott Sadler	Richard Petty Motorsports	Ford	310	79
29	98	Paul Menard	Richard Petty Motorsports	Ford	310	76
30	83	Kasey Kahne	Red Bull Racing Team	Toyota	310	73
31	26	J. J. Yeley	Latitude 43 Motorsports	Ford	309	70
32	77	Sam Hornish Jr.	Penske Racing	Dodge	309	67
33	7	Robby Gordon	Robby Gordon Motorsports	Toyota	308	64
34	38	Travis Kvapil	Front Row Motorsports	Ford	308	61
35	82	Scott Speed	Red Bull Racing Team	Toyota	307	58
36	34	Tony Raines	Front Row Motorsports	Ford	306	55
37	36	Dave Blaney	Tommy Baldwin Racing	Chevrolet	306	52
38	37	David Gilliland	Front Row Motorsports	Ford	274	49
39	55	Mike Bliss	Prism Motorsports	Toyota	193	46
40	64	Landon Cassill	Max Q Motorsports	Toyota	191	43
41	81	Terry Labonte	Whitney Motorsports	Dodge	190	40
42	12	Brad Keselowski	Penske Racing	Dodge	58	37
43	71	Brendan Gaughan	TRG Motorsports	Chevrolet	1	34
^{1} Includes five bonus points for leading a lap
^{2} Includes ten bonus points for leading the most laps

== Standings after the race ==
Drivers' Championship standings

Pos	Driver	Points
1	Denny Hamlin	6462
2	Jimmie Johnson	6447
3	Kevin Harvick	6416
4	Carl Edwards	6198
5	Matt Kenseth	6151
6	Jeff Gordon	6124
7	Kyle Busch	6115
8	Greg Biffle	6113
9	Tony Stewart	6074
10	Kurt Busch	6033
11	Clint Bowyer	6028
12	Jeff Burton	5958

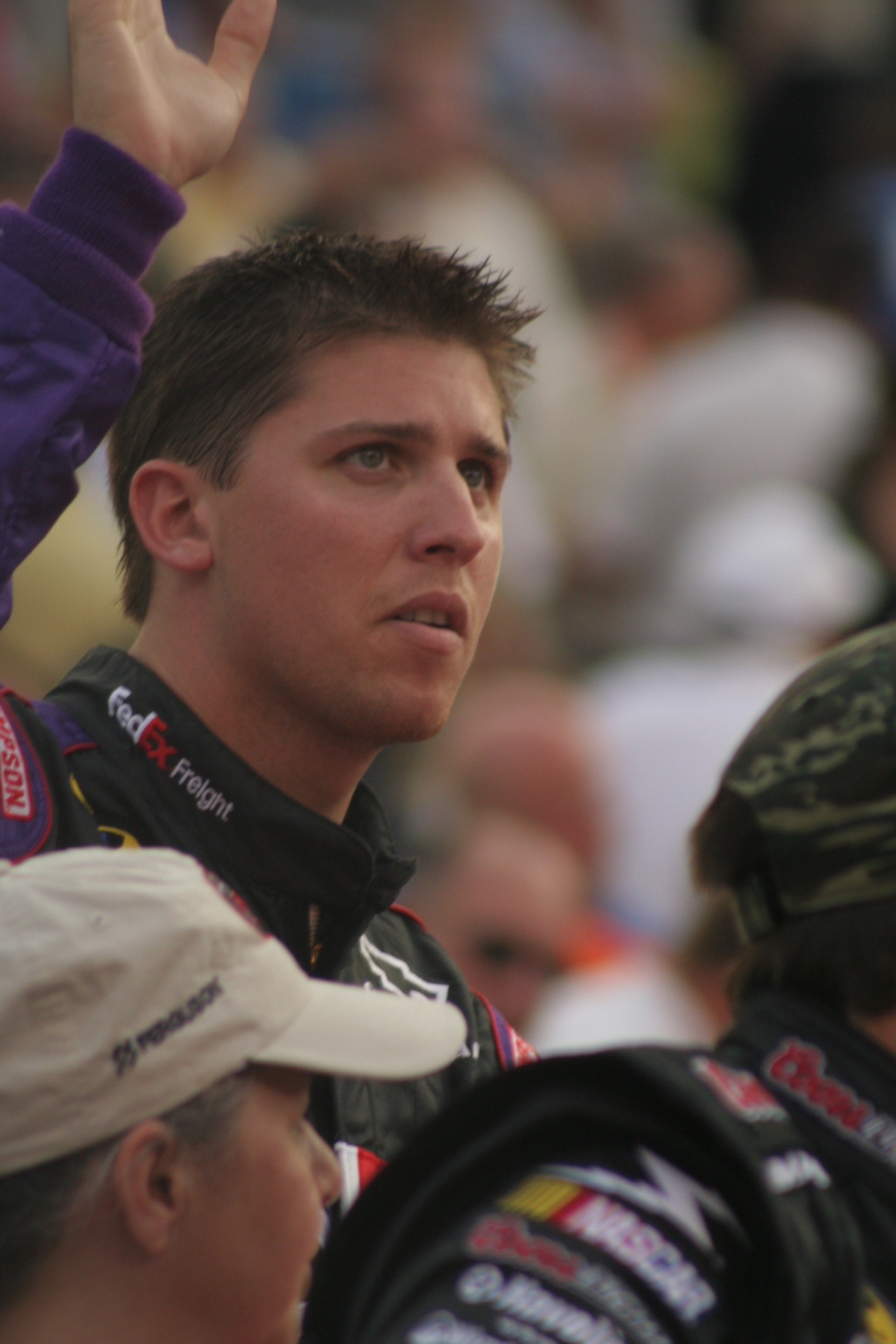
Denny Hamlin remained as the point leader after nine races completed.

Manufacturers' Championship standings

Pos	Manufacturer	Points
1	Chevrolet	255
2	Toyota	213
3	Ford	167
4	Dodge	135

- Note: Only the top twelve positions are included for the driver standings. These drivers qualified for the Chase for the Sprint Cup.

Previous race: 2010 AAA Texas 500	Sprint Cup Series; 2010 season	Next race: 2010 Ford 400
