= The Jimmy Giuffre Quartet in Person =

Live album by The Jimmy Giuffre Quartet
- Released: 1960
- Recorded: July 19, 1960; Five Spot Café, NYC
- Genre: Jazz
- Label: Verve; MGV 8387

Jimmy Giuffre chronology
| Piece for Clarinet and String Orchestra/Mobiles (1960) | The Jimmy Giuffre Quartet in Person (1960) | Fusion (1961) |

The Jimmy Giuffre Quartet in Person is a live album by American jazz composer and arranger Jimmy Giuffre which was released on the Verve label in 1959.

== Reception ==
Professional ratings
Review scores
| Source | Rating |
|---|---|
| Allmusic | 3/5 stars |

Allmusic awarded the album 3 stars.

== Track listing ==
All compositions by Jimmy Giuffre except as indicated

1. "The Quiet Time" - 9:30
2. "The Crab" - 8:27
3. "My Funny Valentine" (Richard Rodgers, Lorenz Hart) - 8:00
4. "Wee See" (Thelonious Monk) - 9:22
5. "What's New?" (Bob Haggart, Johnny Burke) - 6:30
6. "Two for Timbuctu" - 6:57

== Personnel ==
- Jimmy Giuffre - clarinet, tenor saxophone
- Jim Hall - guitar
- Buell Neidlinger - bass
- Billy Osborne - drums
