= Momentum, Willisau 1988 =

Live album by Jimmy Giuffre and André Jaume
- Released: 1997
- Recorded: September 3, 1988
- Venue: Jazz Festival Willisau, Willisau, Switzerland
- Genre: Jazz
- Length: 46:15
- Label: HatOLOGY; 508
- Producer: Pia & Werner X. Uehlinger

Jimmy Giuffre chronology
Eiffel: Live in Paris, 1987 (1987)	Momentum, Willisau 1988 (1997)	Liquid Dancers (1989)

Momentum, Willisau 1988 is a live album by saxophonists Jimmy Giuffre and André Jaume which was released on the Swiss HatOLOGY label in 1997.

== Reception ==
Professional ratings
Review scores
Source	Rating
Allmusic	4/5 stars
The Penguin Guide to Jazz Recordings	3/4 stars

Allmusic said "Veteran Jimmy Giuffre (heard here on clarinet and soprano) and André Jaume (doubling on tenor and bass clarinet) perform obscure and mostly spontaneous originals. The fairly basic themes contrast sound and silence, and the thoughtful renditions contain subtle surprises and fine interplay. A sleeper that is well worth picking up". Duck Baker in JazzTimes stated "There are moments of real beauty on the best duets, but the cumulative effect of the set is even more rewarding, perhaps because everything that happens is unforced. Good duo work is rare because it’s difficult; Giuffre and Jaume make it sound effortles".

== Track listing ==
All compositions by Jimmy Giuffre except where noted.

1. "Eiffel" – 4:23
2. "Momentum" – 2:48
3. "I'll Be There" (Giuffre, André Jaume) – 4:00
4. "Standpoint" (Jaume) – 3:13
5. "Sequence" (Giuffre, Jaume) – 4:15
6. "Once" – 2:35
7. "Dialogue" – 3:54
8. "Dotted Line" (Jaume) – 3:25
9. "Mirecourt" (Jaume) – 3:52
10. "Dinky Toys II" (Jaume) – 4:53
11. "Moonlight" – 4:22
12. "Encore"(Giuffre, Jaume) – 4:36

== Personnel ==
- Jimmy Giuffre – soprano saxophone, clarinet
- André Jaume – tenor saxophone, bass clarinet
