= Trav'lin' Light (Jimmy Giuffre 3 album) =

Studio album by Jimmy Giuffre
- Released: 1958
- Genre: Jazz
- Label: Atlantic

Jimmy Giuffre chronology
Jimmy Giuffre 3 (1957)	Trav'lin' Light (1958)	The Four Brothers Sound (1958)

Professional ratings
Review scores
Source	Rating
AllMusic	4/5 stars

Trav'lin' Light is a 1958 album by the Jimmy Giuffre 3.

Nat Hentoff writes about novelty of the release in its liner notes: "The incorporation of Bob Brookmeyer into the Jimmy Giuffre 3 makes this unit even more intriguing, both in its present capacity to work tri-linear subtle sorcery on the listener and in its indications for the future to other jazz players.

There is, for example, no bass, drums and piano in this ensemble — to the initial shock of a number of musicians who had become accustomed to pianoless and even drumless combos but began to mumble, Saroyan-fashion, "There's no foundation all along the line" when informed of the new instrumentation of the Jimmy Giuffre 3. Those who heard the group's debut, however, at New York's Village Vanguard soon forgot the absence of the traditional rhythm section because the group swung more fully than it ever had before. Even some musicians don't wholly remember that the ability to swing must first reside in the musician. If he depends on a rhythm section, no matter how infectious that section may be, to swing him, then he is in the position of the rejected suitor who cannot understand that one must be able to give love to receive it."

== Early version ==
Giuffre recorded the eight songs on "Trav'lin' Light" in December of 1957 in a trio with Jim Hall on guitar and bassist Jim Atlas on December 2, 1957, in New York City. The arrangements recorded in the initial session were adapted for the later group that replaced the acoustic bass with the valve trombone. This earlier session was eventually released on the Gambit Records CD release "Jimmy Giuffre/Jim Hall Trio: Complete Studio Recordings" (Gambit 6900, 2008). Two of the tracks were also released on the 1988 CD release of The Jimmy Giuffre 3.

== Track listing ==
1. Trav'lin' Light - (Johnny Mercer, Jimmy Mundy, Trummy Young)
2. The Swamp People - (Giuffre)
3. The Green Country (New England Mood) - (Giuffre)
4. 42nd Street (song) - (Al Dubin, Harry Warren)
5. Pickin' 'Em Up and Layin' 'Em Down - (Giuffre)
6. The Lonely Time - (Giuffre)
7. Show Me the Way to Go Home - (Jimmy Campbell and Reg Connelly)
8. California, Here I Come - (Buddy DeSylva, Al Jolson, Joseph Meyer)

== Personnel ==
- Jimmy Giuffre - clarinet, tenor, baritone
- Bob Brookmeyer - valve trombone
- Jim Hall - guitar

Recorded January 20–23, 1958, in New York City.
