= 2010 Ford 400 =

Race details
- Race 36 of 36 in the 2010 NASCAR Sprint Cup Series
- Homestead-Miami Speedway
- Date: November 21, 2010
- Location: Homestead, Florida, US
- Course: Permanent racing facility
- Course length: 1.5 miles (2.4 km)
- Distance: 267 laps, 400.5 mi (644.542 km)
- Weather: Partly cloudy with a high around 80; wind out of the ESE at 12 mph.
- Average speed: 126.58 miles per hour (203.71 km/h)

Pole position
Driver	Kasey Kahne	Red Bull Racing Team
- Time: 30.525

Most laps led
Driver	Carl Edwards	Roush Fenway Racing
- Laps: 192

Winner
No. 99	Carl Edwards	Roush Fenway Racing

Television in the United States
- Network: ESPN
- Announcers: Marty Reid, Dale Jarrett and Andy Petree

The 2010 Ford 400 was a NASCAR Sprint Cup Series race that was held on November 21, 2010, at Homestead–Miami Speedway in Homestead, Florida, United States. The 267 lap race was the thirty-sixth in the 2010 NASCAR Sprint Cup Series, as well as the final race in the ten-race Chase for the Sprint Cup, which ends the season. The race was won by Carl Edwards for the Roush Fenway Racing team. Jimmie Johnson finished second, and Kevin Harvick clinched third.

Pole position driver Kasey Kahne maintained his lead on the first lap of the race. Edwards started in the second position on the grid, and became the leader of the race on the fourth lap. Shortly after a restart on lap 22, championship leader Denny Hamlin spun sideways, resulting with damage to his splitter. Martin Truex Jr. took the lead on lap 73, but after the final pit stops Edwards was first. He maintained the lead to win the race, having led it for 192 laps.

A total of 67,000 people attended the race, while 5.605 million watched it on television. There were ten cautions in the race, as well as twenty-five lead changes among nine different drivers. Edwards' victory was his second win in the 2010 season, with the first coming the previous week at the Kobalt Tools 500. Jimmie Johnson won the Drivers' Championship, 39 points ahead of Denny Hamlin. Johnson's team owner Rick Hendrick won the Owners' Championship. Chevrolet won the Manufacturer Championship with 261 points, 44 points ahead of Toyota.

== Report ==
=== Background ===
Homestead–Miami Speedway, the race track where the race was held

Homestead–Miami Speedway is one of ten intermediate tracks to hold NASCAR races; the others are Atlanta Motor Speedway, Kansas Speedway, Chicagoland Speedway, Darlington Raceway, Texas Motor Speedway, New Hampshire Motor Speedway, Kentucky Speedway, Las Vegas Motor Speedway, and Charlotte Motor Speedway. The race was held on the standard track at Homestead Miami Speedway; a four-turn oval track that is 1.5 miles (2.4 km) long. The track's turns are banked from 18 to 20 degrees, while the front stretch, the location of the finish line, is banked at three degrees. The back stretch, opposite of the front, also has a three degree banking. The racetrack has seats for 65,000 spectators.

Heading into the final race of the season, Toyota driver Denny Hamlin was leading the Drivers' Championship with 6,462 points; Chevrolet driver Jimmie Johnson was second with 6,447 points, 15 points behind Hamlin. A maximum of 195 points were available for the final race. Behind Hamlin and Johnson in the Drivers' Championship, Kevin Harvick was third with 6,416 points in a Chevrolet, and Carl Edwards was fourth with 6,198 points. Chevrolet had already secured the Manufacturer's Championship, and entered the race on 255 points, 42 points ahead of Toyota on 213 points, with a maximum of nine points available at the Ford 400. Hamlin was the race's defending winner, after his victory at the 2009 race.

=== Practice and qualifying ===
Three practice sessions were held before the race; the first on Friday, which lasted 90 minutes. The second and third were both on Saturday afternoon. The first Saturday practice lasted 45 minutes, while the second lasted 60. Edwards was quickest with a time of 30.710 seconds in the first session, 0.134 seconds faster than Kyle Busch. Johnson was just off Busch's pace, followed by Matt Kenseth, Jamie McMurray, and Jeff Gordon. Kasey Kahne was seventh, still within a second of Edwards's time.

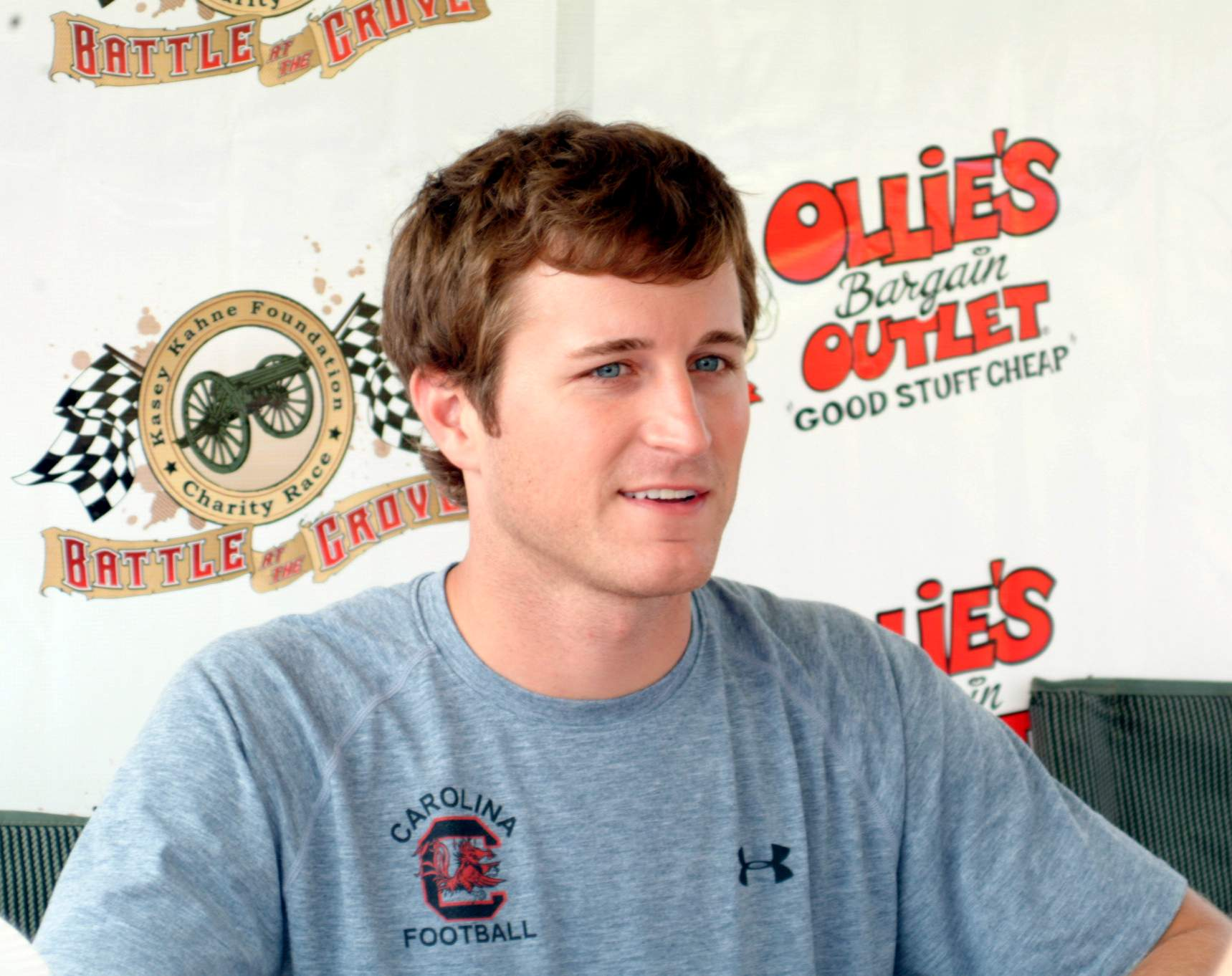
Kasey Kahne qualified on the pole position for Red Bull Racing Team

Forty-five cars were entered for qualifying, but only forty-three could qualify for the race because of NASCAR's qualifying procedure. Kahne clinched the 20th pole position of his career, with a time of 30.525 seconds. He was joined on the front row of the grid by Edwards. McMurray qualified third, Bill Elliott took fourth, and A. J. Allmendinger started fifth. Johnson, David Reutimann, Mark Martin, David Ragan and Regan Smith rounded out the top ten. Hamlin only managed 37th, having getting close to the wall. The two drivers that failed to qualify for the race were Patrick Carpentier, and Michael McDowell. Once the qualifying session completed, Kahne commented, "That was the best qualifying run by far since I joined Red Bull. I look forward to Sunday’s race. It’s going to be exciting being up front now, being in the mix with Denny [Hamlin], Kevin [Harvick] and Jimmie [Johnson]. They’re all going to be fast throughout the race. I’m just glad we are so far. Hopefully we can stick with it tomorrow, have a good practice and be competitive in the mix on Sunday."

In the second practice session, Busch was fastest with a time of 31.425 seconds, less than five-hundredths of a second quicker than second-placed Jeff Burton. Gordon took third place, ahead of Greg Biffle, Martin and Hamlin. Johnson only managed 11th place.

"I think for all these teams, the bigger goal is win it for the organization. That's why you probably see the crew swaps and stuff. They're doing what's best to win for their organization because they know if one of those teams wins that championship, it's going to benefit all of them. There's a bigger picture than each individual driver winning a championship."

— Denny Hamlin, following the third practice session.

Harvick was only quick enough for 19th position. In the third and final practice, Burton was quickest with a time of 31.850 seconds. Kahne followed in second, ahead of Martin Truex Jr. and Hamlin. Jamie McMurray was fifth quickest, with a time of 31.916 seconds. Edwards, Gordon, Ragan, Biffle, and Aric Almirola rounded out the first ten positions. Johnson, who was eleventh in the second session, could only manage 22nd. Following the third practice session, Harvick stated, "We didn't put up a fast lap but it never slows down. I'm really excited." Afterward, Johnson commented "We struggled a little bit maybe in the first practice. But I found a good direction and started making some good gains there at the end. I feel really good about our car. It's very comfortable. I can run the top, run the bottom. I think we're in good shape." "I think we've got the balance real close," Johnson continued. "My motor's running great. Maybe some overall grip but I think there I'm one of 43 guys that are saying that. This hot sun out here [is making] the track awful slick."

=== Race ===
The race, the last in the season, began at 1:00 p.m. EST and was televised live in the United States on ESPN. The conditions on the grid were dry before the race, the air temperature at 80 °F (27 °C); overcast skies were expected. Tim Griffin began pre-race ceremonies, by giving the invocation. Next, Bret Michaels along with Miami native Nanette Melina, performed the national anthem, and gave the command for drivers to start their engines. During the pace laps, Sam Hornish Jr. had to move to the rear of the grid because of changing to his backup car.

Kasey Kahne retained his pole position lead into the first corner, followed by Carl Edwards, who started second. On the following two laps, Jimmie Johnson took over the fourth position. On the fourth lap, Edwards passed Kahne for the first position. After starting from 37th, Denny Hamlin had moved to 27th by lap six. Eleventh-placed qualifier Jeff Gordon joined teammate Johnson in the top ten four laps later. Johnson passed A. J. Allmendinger on lap 12 to claim the third position, as David Reutimann and Kurt Busch collided into the wall. Five laps later, the first caution was given after Reutimann collided into the wall again. Most of the front runners made pit stops, except for J. J. Yeley, who didn't pit until the following lap. At the lap 22 restart, Edwards was first, ahead of Kahne, Allmendinger, and Johnson. On lap 24, Hamlin collided with Greg Biffle coming out of turn 2 and spun sideways through the grass on the backstretch, prompting the second caution of the day. Hamlin sustained minor damage to his splitter as a result of the contact with Biffle, but when interviewed post-race, Hamlin stated the car was not the same after the incident. Edwards remained the leader during the restart, while Allmendinger took over second from Kahne.

After starting 28th, Kevin Harvick had advanced to the tenth position by lap 28. Two laps later, Greg Biffle said on his team radio that he could smell smoke in his race car, which his team responded that it was probably a tire rubbing against the car. During lap 34, Martin Truex Jr. moved to seventh, having started 25th on the grid. Four laps later, Hamlin had moved to the 22nd position after his earlier accident. On the 41st lap, Truex Jr. moved past Johnson to claim the fourth position, while Hamlin continued to move toward the front runners. Edwards had over a one-second lead over the second position by lap 46. On the following lap, Hamlin took over the 18th position. After 50 laps, only 38 cars remained on the same lap as the leader. Edwards continued to expand his lead from 1.33 to 1.6 seconds in only five laps. On lap 54, Edwards was the leader, ahead of Allmendinger, Kahne, Truex, and Johnson.

Matt Kenseth took over the tenth position on lap 58. On lap 66, Hamlin made a pit stop, and Allmendinger did likewise two laps later. Juan Pablo Montoya and Kahne made their pit stops during the 69th lap. Edwards made a pit stop the following lap, giving the first position to Johnson. In turn, he made a pit stop on lap 71, handing the lead to Truex Jr. On the following lap, Harvick moved to ninth, as Hamlin took over 16th. By lap 77, Truex Jr. had a 1.2 second lead over Kahne. Seven laps later, Aric Almirola moved into the fifth position, Harvick was moving toward Johnson in seventh. By the 93rd lap, Truex Jr. increased his lead to 1.5 seconds. Five laps later, the third caution was given because of debris. Most of the front runners made pit stops during the caution, as Hamlin's team worked to repair his splitter. At the lap 102 restart, Truex Jr. was first, ahead of Edwards and Kahne in second and third. During the pit stops Johnson fell to 10th.

With assistance from Kyle Busch, Harvick took over fifth place on the following lap. Afterward, Edwards became the leader, after passing Truex Jr. On lap 105, Jamie McMurray passed Truex Jr. to move into second. David Ragan passed Kahne for the tenth position eleven laps later. Having led 86 of the first 124 laps, Edwards was finally passed on lap 125. Truex Jr. moved into first position, and by the same lap Almirola had slipped to tenth. Marcos Ambrose spun sideways on lap 135, causing the fourth caution of the race. The front runners subsequently made pit stops. At the lap 139 restart, Truex Jr. was the leader, ahead of Edwards, Harvick, and Johnson. One lap later, Montoya and Joey Logano collided, which resulted in Logano spinning sideways and sustaining major damage. At the lap 143 restart, Edwards was leader, after passing Truex Jr. before the previous caution. On the following lap, Johnson fell to fifth, as Harvick moved to third. During lap 145, Kyle Busch took third away from Harvick. Two laps later, Truex Jr. reclaimed the lead from Edwards.

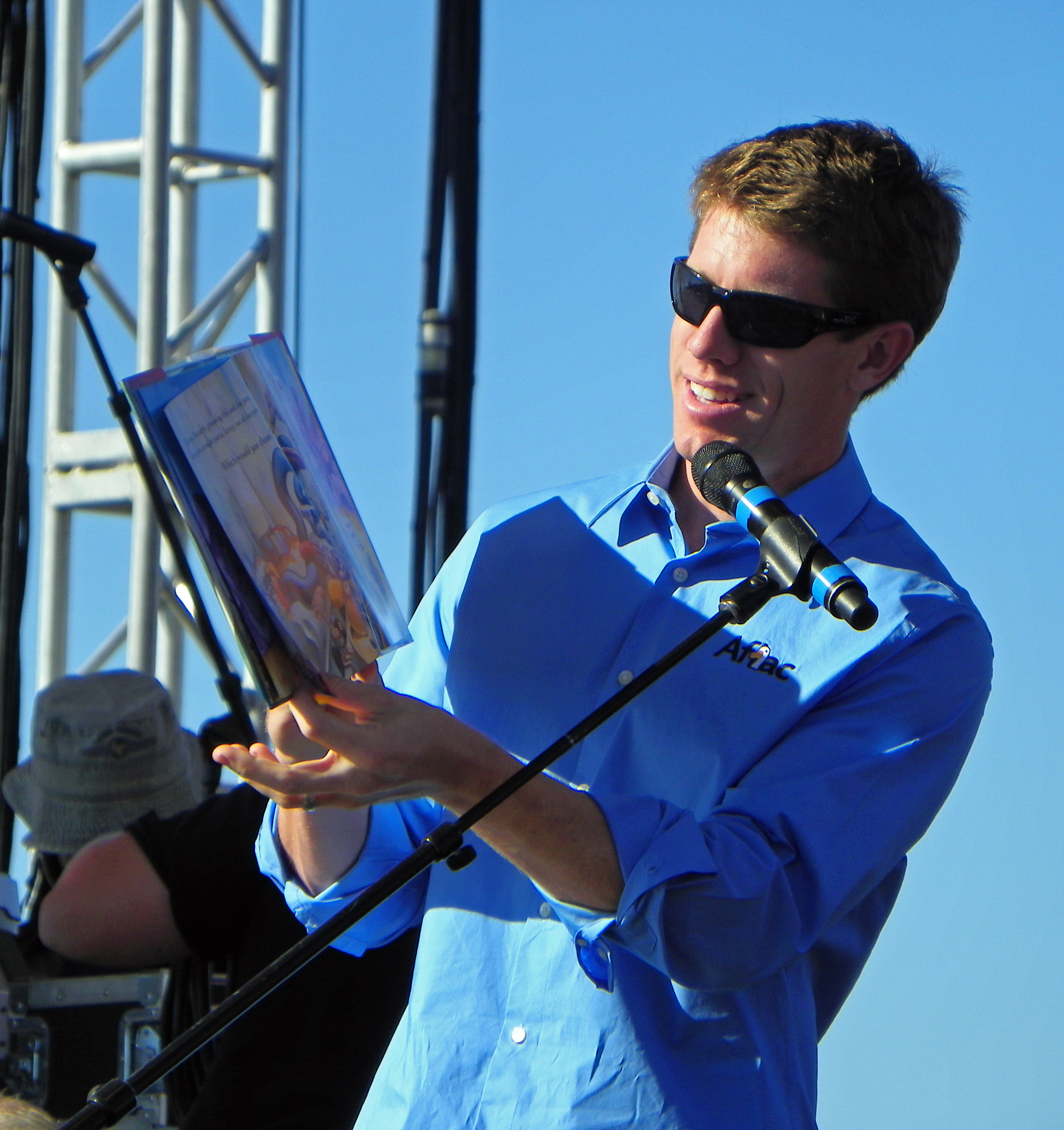
Carl Edwards, after leading the most laps, won the race.

On lap 152, Johnson fell to seventh, after McMurray passed him. On the following lap, Ryan Newman moved to the sixth position, as McMurray moved to fifth. By the 158th lap, Truex Jr. had a 1.2 second lead over Edwards. Six laps later, Kevin Conway spun sideways, prompting the sixth caution to be given. Most of the front runners made pit stop during the caution. At the lap 168 restart, Edwards was first, ahead of Kyle Busch, Harvick, and Truex Jr. Two laps later, Hamlin moved to ninth, after passing Almirola. On lap 175, Tony Stewart moved to sixth, after starting the race in 31st. Five laps later, Harvick moved into the third position, as Truex Jr. was moving toward Edwards. During the 183rd lap, Jeff Burton collided into the wall. On the following lap, Hamlin moved into sixth. On lap 186, the seventh caution was given because of debris. Most of the front runners made pit stops during the caution. Harvick became the leader under the caution, but was given a pit road speeding penalty, resulting in him starting in the rear of the grid. Truex Jr. led to the restart, as Edwards was second. The eighth caution was given two laps later because Dave Blaney collided into the wall. Harvick made pit stops during the caution, while the front runners stayed on the track. On lap 198, Edwards was first, ahead of Kenseth, Truex Jr. and Stewart.

Gordon's engine blew up on the 200th lap, prompting the ninth caution of the race. Edwards remained the leader on the restart, ahead of Kenseth, Kyle Busch, and Stewart. Harvick passed Hamlin for ninth place on lap 207, as Johnson and Kyle Busch were competing for the third position. Five laps later, Kyle Busch claimed third, as Johnson remained behind him. Johnson re-took the position on lap 213, after getting assistance from Stewart. Ten laps after the restart, Edwards had increased his lead to 1.29 seconds over second, as Brad Keselowski took the eighth position from Hamlin. During the 219th lap, Johnson moved into second, 2.58 seconds behind Edwards. Two laps later, Almirola and Biffle passed Hamlin, as Harvick moved to sixth. By the 230th lap, Edwards had over a two-second lead over Johnson. Nine laps later, Hamlin, Harvick, and Johnson made pit stops. During lap 240, Martin became the leader. On the following lap, Martin made a pit stop, giving the lead to Kahne.

The tenth caution was given on lap 243 when Harvick and Kyle Busch collided, resulting in Busch spinning sideways and colliding into the wall. His car was engulfed in flames, but he was pulled from the car by NASCAR personnel. At the lap 250 restart, Edwards was the leader, ahead of Johnson, Kenseth, and Harvick. On the following lap, Harvick passed Kenseth for third, as Hamlin fell to 21st. By lap 254, Edwards had less than a one-second lead over Johnson, while Harvick was 2.59 seconds behind. Edwards continued to increase his lead, as Hamlin passed Martin for 15th. With seven laps remaining, Edwards had a 1.67 second lead over Johnson. As Edwards crossed the finish line to win the race, Johnson won his fifth consecutive championship. Harvick finished third, ahead of Almirola and Allmendinger in fourth and fifth. Kahne, Newman, Stewart, Kenseth and Biffle rounded out the top ten finishers in the race.

=== Post-race ===
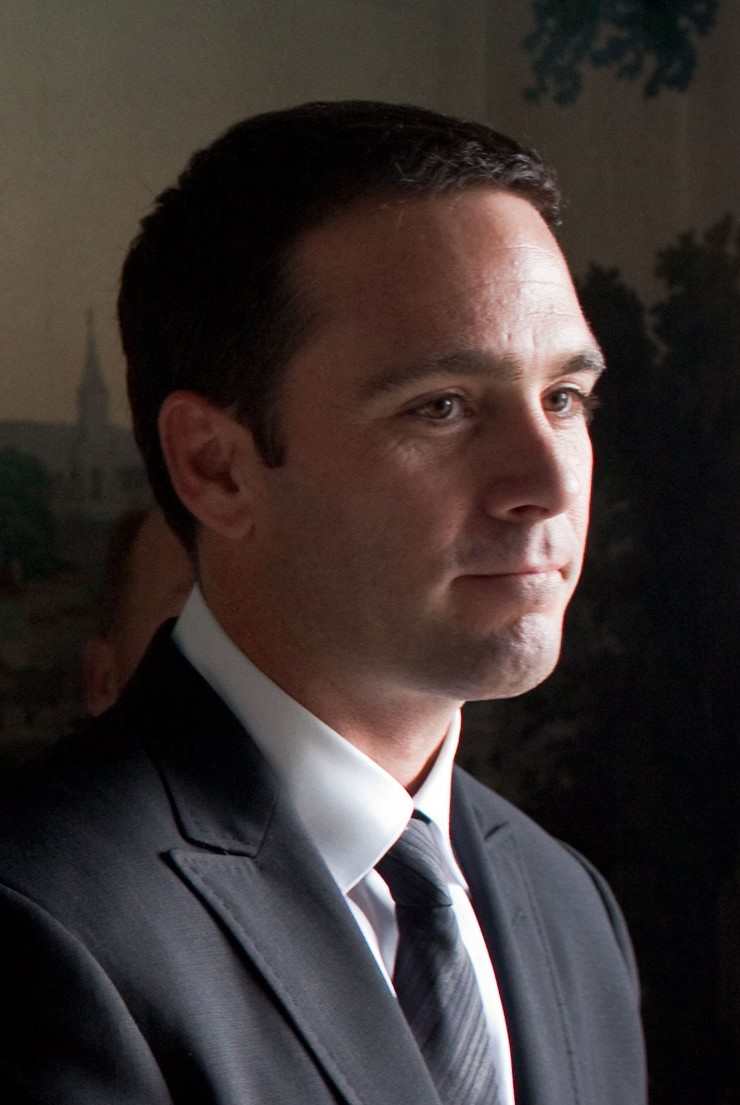
Jimmie Johnson won the championship, after finishing second in the race

"I can't believe this. It's unbelievable. You guys are the best. I can't thank you enough."

— Jimmie Johnson, speaking on his team radio after winning the championship.

Race winner Carl Edwards appeared in victory lane after his victory lap. He celebrated his second consecutive win, in front of a crowd of 67,000 people. After winning the race, he said "Why didn't you set the cars up like this before, Bob [Osbourne]? That was the best performance down the straightaway I've had in a long time."

Afterward, Johnson began celebrating his fifth consecutive Sprint Cup Series championship. During the celebration, Johnson's crew chief, Chad Knaus commented, "I think finally, finally after pulling this off Jimmie will get the respect that he deserves. Knowing what we had to do — come down here and beat them — and we beat them." Hamlin, the points leader before the race, described his disappointment by saying, "I’m disappointed. Our car was lightning fast until that last wreck. When we hit the 16 (Biffle) that knocked the toe-in out. It wasn’t as fast after that. It’s just circumstances but we had a great year. We won the most races (8) and we contended like we have never contended before but circumstances took us out of this one. I don’t think the 48 (Johnson) showed the strength this year like they did in the past and that opened the door for the rest of us." Harvick, who finished third in points, stated:

"We went down swinging and that is what we came here to do. Those guys outran us on that last restart there. All in all I’m proud of all my guys. We did everything we wanted to do today but win the race. This is a great spot to start building for consistent championship runs next year. We had a top three car but they got by us on the restarts. All in all, it was a good day. What can you do?"

During the post-race press conference, Harvick and Busch commented on their accident during the race. "Harvick pulled a slide job on my earlier in the day, I crossed over and passed him clean. My guys worked way too hard to be in this position to have a wrecked race car at the end of the year. It means so much to me to finish the year strong. I talked to him in the driver’s meeting but Kevin is such a two-faced guy it doesn’t really matter," Busch said. Afterward, Harvick said "Kyle raced me like a clown all day."

In the Drivers' Championship, Johnson finished first with 6,622 points, 39 ahead of Hamlin in second. Harvick followed in third with 6,581 points. Edwards and Kenseth rounded out the first five positions with 6,393 and 6,294. In the Manufacturers' Championship, Chevrolet won with 261 points, 44 ahead of Toyota and 85 ahead of Ford. Dodge finished fourth with 138 points. 5.605 million people watched the race on television. The race took three hours, nine minutes and fifty seconds to complete, and the margin of victory was 1.608 seconds.

== Results ==
=== Qualifying ===
Grid	Car	Driver	Team	Manufacturer	Time	Speed
1	83	Kasey Kahne	Red Bull Racing Team	Toyota	30.525	176.904
2	99	Carl Edwards	Roush Fenway Racing	Ford	30.556	176.725
3	1	Jamie McMurray	Earnhardt Ganassi Racing	Chevrolet	30.558	176.713
4	21	Bill Elliott	Wood Brothers Racing	Ford	30.580	176.586
5	43	A. J. Allmendinger	Richard Petty Motorsports	Ford	30.583	176.569
6	48	Jimmie Johnson	Hendrick Motorsports	Chevrolet	30.598	176.482
7	00	David Reutimann	Michael Waltrip Racing	Toyota	30.603	176.453
8	5	Mark Martin	Hendrick Motorsports	Chevrolet	30.605	176.442
9	6	David Ragan	Roush Fenway Racing	Ford	30.626	176.321
10	78	Regan Smith	Furniture Row Racing	Chevrolet	30.644	176.217
11	24	Jeff Gordon	Hendrick Motorsports	Chevrolet	30.648	176.194
12	19	Elliott Sadler	Richard Petty Motorsports	Ford	30.651	176.177
13	17	Matt Kenseth	Roush Fenway Racing	Ford	30.662	176.114
14	31	Jeff Burton	Richard Childress Racing	Chevrolet	30.672	176.056
15	2	Kurt Busch	Penske Racing	Dodge	30.695	175.924
16	98	Paul Menard	Richard Petty Motorsports	Ford	30.721	175.775
17	33	Clint Bowyer	Richard Childress Racing	Chevrolet	30.723	175.764
18	12	Brad Keselowski	Penske Racing	Dodge	30.734	175.701
19	20	Joey Logano	Joe Gibbs Racing	Toyota	30.742	175.656
20	47	Marcos Ambrose	JTG Daugherty Racing	Toyota	30.747	175.627
21	36	J. J. Yeley	Tommy Baldwin Racing	Chevrolet	30.761	175.547
22	88	Dale Earnhardt Jr.	Hendrick Motorsports	Chevrolet	30.796	175.347
23	39	Ryan Newman	Stewart Haas Racing	Chevrolet	30.813	175.251
24	9	Aric Almirola	Richard Petty Motorsports	Ford	30.826	175.177
25	56	Martin Truex Jr.	Michael Waltrip Racing	Toyota	30.830	175.154
26	77	Sam Hornish Jr.	Penske Racing	Dodge	30.838	175.109
27	16	Greg Biffle	Roush Fenway Racing	Ford	30.852	175.029
28	29	Kevin Harvick	Richard Childress Racing	Chevrolet	30.870	174.927
29	87	Joe Nemechek	NEMCO Motorsports	Toyota	30.876	174.893
30	66	Mike Bliss	Prism Motorsports	Toyota	30.887	174.831
31	14	Tony Stewart	Stewart Haas Racing	Chevrolet	30.889	174.820
32	09	Bobby Labonte	Phoenix Racing	Chevrolet	30.889	174.820
33	18	Kyle Busch	Joe Gibbs Racing	Toyota	30.937	174.548
34	13	Casey Mears	Germain Racing	Toyota	30.948	174.486
35	71	Andy Lally	TRG Motorsports	Chevrolet	30.951	174.469
36	38	Dave Blaney	Front Row Motorsports	Ford	30.954	174.452
37	11	Denny Hamlin	Joe Gibbs Racing	Toyota	30.962	174.407
38	37	David Gilliland	Front Row Motorsports	Ford	31.049	173.919
39	34	Travis Kvapil	Front Row Motorsports	Ford	31.055	173.885
40	42	Juan Pablo Montoya	Earnhardt Ganassi Racing	Chevrolet	31.212	173.010
41	82	Scott Speed	Red Bull Racing Team	Toyota	31.216	172.988
42	7	Kevin Conway	Robby Gordon Motorsports	Toyota	31.629	170.729
43	64	Landon Cassill	Gunselman Motorsports	Toyota	30.954	174.452
Failed to qualify
44	46	Michael McDowell	Whitney Motorsports	Chevrolet	30.962	174.407
45	26	Patrick Carpentier	Latitude 43 Motorsports	Ford	31.320	172.414

=== Race results ===
Pos.	Grid	Car	Driver	Team	Manufacturer	Laps	Pts
1	2	99	Carl Edwards	Roush Fenway Racing	Ford	267	195^{2}
2	6	48	Jimmie Johnson	Hendrick Motorsports	Chevrolet	267	175^{1}
3	28	29	Kevin Harvick	Richard Childress Racing	Chevrolet	267	165
4	24	9	Aric Almirola	Richard Petty Motorsports	Ford	267	160
5	5	43	A. J. Allmendinger	Richard Petty Motorsports	Ford	267	155
6	1	83	Kasey Kahne	Red Bull Racing Team	Toyota	267	155^{1}
7	23	39	Ryan Newman	Stewart Haas Racing	Chevrolet	267	146
8	31	14	Tony Stewart	Stewart Haas Racing	Chevrolet	267	147^{1}
9	13	17	Matt Kenseth	Roush Fenway Racing	Ford	267	143^{1}
10	27	16	Greg Biffle	Roush Fenway Racing	Ford	267	134
11	25	56	Martin Truex Jr.	Michael Waltrip Racing	Toyota	267	135^{1}
12	17	33	Clint Bowyer	Richard Childress Racing	Chevrolet	267	127
13	18	12	Brad Keselowski	Penske Racing	Dodge	267	124
14	37	11	Denny Hamlin	Joe Gibbs Racing	Toyota	267	121
15	4	21	Bill Elliott	Wood Brothers Racing	Ford	267	118
16	8	5	Mark Martin	Hendrick Motorsports	Chevrolet	267	115
17	10	78	Regan Smith	Furniture Row Racing	Chevrolet	267	112
18	15	2	Kurt Busch	Penske Racing	Dodge	267	109
19	16	98	Paul Menard	Richard Petty Motorsports	Ford	267	106
20	9	6	David Ragan	Roush Fenway Racing	Ford	267	103
21	3	1	Jamie McMurray	Earnhardt Ganassi Racing	Chevrolet	267	100
22	32	09	Bobby Labonte	Phoenix Racing	Chevrolet	267	97
23	41	82	Scott Speed	Red Bull Racing Team	Toyota	267	94
24	26	77	Sam Hornish Jr.	Penske Racing	Dodge	267	91
25	38	37	David Gilliland	Front Row Motorsports	Ford	267	88
26	20	47	Marcos Ambrose	JTG Daugherty Racing	Toyota	267	85
27	22	88	Dale Earnhardt Jr.	Hendrick Motorsports	Chevrolet	267	82
28	12	19	Elliott Sadler	Richard Petty Motorsports	Ford	267	79
29	35	71	Andy Lally	TRG Motorsports	Chevrolet	266	76
30	42	7	Kevin Conway	Robby Gordon Motorsports	Toyota	263	73
31	14	31	Jeff Burton	Richard Childress Racing	Chevrolet	253	75^{1}
32	33	18	Kyle Busch	Joe Gibbs Racing	Toyota	242	67
33	34	13	Casey Mears	Germain Racing	Toyota	233	64
34	39	34	Travis Kvapil	Front Row Motorsports	Ford	231	61
35	40	42	Juan Pablo Montoya	Earnhardt Ganassi Racing	Chevrolet	231	58
36	36	38	Dave Blaney	Front Row Motorsports	Ford	203	55
37	11	24	Jeff Gordon	Hendrick Motorsports	Chevrolet	199	52
38	7	00	David Reutimann	Michael Waltrip Racing	Toyota	185	49
39	19	20	Joey Logano	Joe Gibbs Racing	Toyota	166	46
40	43	64	Landon Cassill	Gunselman Motorsports	Toyota	35	43
41	29	87	Joe Nemechek	NEMCO Motorsports	Toyota	29	40
42	21	36	J. J. Yeley	Tommy Baldwin Racing	Chevrolet	25	42^{1}
43	30	66	Mike Bliss	Prism Motorsports	Toyota	10	34
^{1} Includes five bonus points for leading a lap
^{2} Includes ten bonus points for leading the most laps

== Standings after the race ==
Drivers' Championship standings
Rank	Driver	Points
1	Jimmie Johnson	6,622
2	Denny Hamlin	6,583
3	Kevin Harvick	6,581
4	Carl Edwards	6,393
5	Matt Kenseth	6,294
6	Greg Biffle	6,247
7	Tony Stewart	6,221
8	Kyle Busch	6,182
9	Jeff Gordon	6,176
10	Clint Bowyer	6,155
11	Kurt Busch	6,142
12	Jeff Burton	6,033

Manufacturers' Championship standings
Rank	Manufacturer	Points
1	Chevrolet	261
2	Toyota	217
3	Ford	176
4	Dodge	138

- Note: Only the top twelve positions are included for the driver standings. Those drivers qualified for the Chase for the Sprint Cup.

Previous race: 2010 Kobalt Tools 500	Sprint Cup Series; 2010 season	Next race: 2011 Daytona 500
