= Liquid Dancers =

Studio album by The Jimmy Giuffre 4
- Released: 1991
- Recorded: April 24, 1989
- Studio: RBY Recording Studio, Southbury, CT
- Genre: Jazz
- Length: 40:03
- Label: Soul Note; SN 0158
- Producer: Giovanni Bonandrini

Jimmy Giuffre chronology
Momentum, Willisau 1988 (1988)	Liquid Dancers (1991)	The Life of a Trio: Saturday (1989)

Liquid Dancers is an album by the Jimmy Giuffre 4, saxophonist Jimmy Giuffre, keyboardist Pete Levin, bassist Bob Nieske and drummer Randy Kaye, which was released on the Italian Soul Note label in 1991.

Professional ratings
Review scores
Source	Rating
Allmusic	3/5 stars
The Penguin Guide to Jazz Recordings	3/4 stars

== Track listing ==
All compositions by Jimmy Giuffre

1. "Liquid Dancers" – 4:30
2. "Koko-Nut" – 4:47
3. "Runnin' from the Rain" – 4:20
4. "I Would" – 3:49
5. "Move with the Times" – 3:55
6. "Subway" – 6:25
7. "Vision" – 3:35
8. "The Teacher" – 4:12
9. "If I Was" – 4:40

== Personnel ==
- Jimmy Giuffre – tenor saxophone, soprano saxophone, clarinet, bass flute
- Pete Levin – keyboards
- Bob Nieske – electric bass
- Randy Kaye – drums
