= New York Concerts: The Jimmy Giuffre 3 & 4 =

Live album by Jimmy Giuffre
- Released: 2014
- Recorded: May 19, 1965 and September 3rd, 1965

New York Concerts: The Jimmy Giuffre 3 & 4 is a 2014 live album by saxophonist and clarinetist Jimmy Giuffre, recorded on May 19 and September 3, 1965 and released in 2014 on Elemental Music. The recordings took place during a decade-long period where Giuffre recorded no albums.

Producer Zev Feldman discovered the recordings in 2012, in the archives of Resonance Records founder George Klabin, who recorded the concerts as a student at Columbia University. The 2xCD release includes an informative booklet containing rare photographs and essays by Feldman, Giuffre's widow Juanita, the engineer George Klabin, guitarist Jim Hall, pianist Paul Bley and writers Phillip Carles and Bob Blumenthal.

Giuffre alternates between tenor sax and clarinet, with Joe Chambers on drums and Richard Davis on bass on the September trio recordings, and bassist Barre Phillips, pianist Don Friedman, and Chambers on the May quartet recordings.

All About Jazz writer Hrayr Attarian wrote:

Elegant emotion and stimulating eruditeness coexist throughout both albums. The bluesy "Cry, Want" opens with Giuffre's moaning clarinet that builds intricately woven captivating adlib lines around the main theme. His elegiac and dramatic dialogue with Friedman evolves over bassist Barre Phillips echoing reverberations and Chambers shuffling brushes. Dark and mystical conversations fade in out as do Friedman's atonal and intriguing soliloquy and Giuffre's melancholic, longing song. Phillips' plucked strings and Chambers rebounding strikes with carefully and ominously placed silent pauses usher in the soulful coda. A wrongfully under-recognized genius Giuffre still sounds vibrant and relevant even over the span of a half-century. These newly discovered gems will hopefully help music lovers rediscover his compelling and singular oeuvre.

== Track listing ==
Disc 1

1. Syncopate
2. Intro
3. Crossroads
4. Drive
5. Quadrangle
6. Angles

Disc 2

1. Syncopate
2. Quadrangle
3. Three Bars In One
4. Cry, Want
5. Angles
6. Drive

== Personnel ==
- Jimmy Giuffre: tenor sax, clarinet
- Joe Chambers: drums
- Richard Davis: bass (Disc 1)
- Barre Philips: bass (Disc 2)
- Don Friedman: piano (Disc 2)
