= The Easy Way (Jimmy Giuffre album) =

Studio album by The Jimmy Giuffre 3
- Released: 1959
- Recorded: August 6 & 7, 1959
- Studio: Universal Recording, Chicago, IL
- Genre: Jazz
- Length: 40:14
- Label: Verve; MGV 8337
- Producer: Ken Drunker

Jimmy Giuffre chronology
Lee Konitz Meets Jimmy Giuffre (1959)	The Easy Way (1959)	Piece for Clarinet and String Orchestra/Mobiles (1960)

The Easy Way is an album by American jazz composer and arranger Jimmy Giuffre which was released on the Verve label in 1959.

== Critical reception ==
Professional ratings
Review scores
Source	Rating
Allmusic	4/5 stars
DownBeat	2/5 stars

Ken Dryden of Allmusic states: "Jimmy Giuffre's small-group recordings of the late '50s and early '60s are renowned for his lyrical tone and intimate chamber jazz settings". On All About Jazz Joshua Weiner wrote "The almost psychic interplay here between Giuffre and Hall is typical of the 3, but Brown is a real surprise. He sounds glad to be liberated from the relative stricture of Oscar Peterson's trio, fitting seamlessly into Giuffre's conception while still providing a strong, swinging pulse".

== Track listing ==
All compositions by Jimmy Giuffre unless noted.

1. "The Easy Way" – 5:56
2. "Mack the Knife" (Kurt Weill, Bertolt Brecht) – 4:54
3. "Come Rain or Come Shine" (Harold Arlen, Johnny Mercer) – 4:32
4. "Careful" (Jim Hall) – 6:30
5. "Ray's Time" – 7:00
6. "A Dream" – 2:09
7. "Off Center" – 4:41
8. "Montage" – 1:51
9. "Time Enough" – 2:41

== Personnel ==
- Jimmy Giuffre – clarinet, tenor saxophone, baritone saxophone
- Jim Hall – guitar
- Ray Brown – bass
