= Music for People, Birds, Butterflies and Mosquitoes =

Studio album by The Jimmy Giuffre 3
- Released: 1973
- Recorded: December 1972; Macdonald Studio, Sea Cliff, NY
- Genre: Jazz
- Label: Choice; S-1001
- Producer: Gerry Macdonald

Jimmy Giuffre chronology
Free Fall (1962)	Music for People, Birds, Butterflies and Mosquitoes (1973)	River Chant (1975)

Music for People, Birds, Butterflies and Mosquitoes is an album by American jazz composer and arranger Jimmy Giuffre which was released on the Choice label in 1973.

== Reception ==
Professional ratings
Review scores
Source	Rating
Allmusic	2/5 stars

Scott Yanow of Allmusic states: "The music is moody, fairly spontaneous, and melodic, but often wandering and rather insubstantial... None of the songs clock in over 5:37, and although they form a sort of suite, the overall results are not too memorable".

== Track listing ==
All compositions by Jimmy Giuffre

1. "Mosquito Dance" - 5:37
2. "Night Dance" - 4:11
3. "Flute Song" - 2:37
4. "Eternal Chant" - 2:58
5. "The Bird" - 2:44
6. "The Waiting" - 3:25
7. "The Butterfly" - 2:26
8. "The Chanting" - 4:42
9. "Moonlight" - 3:39
10. "Dervish" - 3:31
11. "Phoenix" - 5:04
12. "Feast Dance" - 3:23

== Personnel ==
- Jimmy Giuffre - tenor saxophone, clarinet, flute, bass flute
- Kiyoshi Tokunaga - bass
- Randy Kaye - percussion
