= Free Fall (Jimmy Giuffre album) =

Studio album by Jimmy Giuffre as Jimmy Giuffre 3
- Released: March 1963
- Recorded: July 9 – November 1, 1962
- Studio: Columbia Studio, NYC
- Genre: Avant-garde jazz, cool jazz, free jazz
- Length: 56:57
- Label: Columbia
- Producer: Michael Cuscuna, Teo Macero

Jimmy Giuffre as Jimmy Giuffre 3 chronology
Flight, Bremen 1961 (1961)	Free Fall (1963)	Music for People, Birds, Butterflies and Mosquitoes (1972)

Professional ratings
Review scores
Source	Rating
Allmusic	4.5/5 stars
Penguin Guide to Jazz	👑

Free Fall is a studio album by Jimmy Giuffre, released in 1963. Allmusic considers it "one of the most revolutionary recordings to come out of the 1960s," and the Penguin Guide to Jazz awards it a "crown" and includes it in its "Core Collection" list.

== Track listing ==
All tracks written by Jimmy Giuffre

Side A

1. Propulsion - 1:44
2. Threewe - 4:11
3. Ornothoids - 2:42
4. Dichotomy - 3:57
5. Man Alone - 2:16
6. Spasmodic - 3:22

Side B

1. Yggdrasill - 2:33
2. Divided Man - 1:52
3. Primordial Call - 2:17
4. The Five Ways - 10:20

1999 CD reissue bonus tracks

1. Present Notion - 3:41
2. Motion Suspended - 3:15
3. Future Plans - 3:55
4. Past Mistakes - 2:05
5. Time Will Tell - 3:49
6. Let's See - 3:25

== Personnel ==
- Jimmy Giuffre - clarinet
- Paul Bley - piano (tracks: 2, 6, 10, 12)
- Steve Swallow - double bass (tracks: 2, 4, 6, 8, 10, 12)
