= The Jimmy Giuffre 3 =

Jimmy Giuffre 3

Studio album by Jimmy Giuffre
- Released: 1957
- Genre: Jazz
- Label: Atlantic

Jimmy Giuffre chronology
The Jimmy Giuffre Clarinet (1956)	Jimmy Giuffre 3 (1957)	The Music Man (1958)

Professional ratings
Review scores
Source	Rating
Allmusic	3/5 stars
Encyclopedia of Popular Music	5/5 stars
The Penguin Guide to Jazz Recordings	3.5/4 stars

Jimmy Giuffre 3 is the 1957 debut album by the Jimmy Giuffre 3.

== Track listing ==
1. "Gotta Dance" - 2:29
2. "Two Kinds of Blues" - 5:10
3. "The Song Is You" (Oscar Hammerstein II, Jerome Kern) - 3:52
4. "Crazy She Calls Me" (Bob Russell, Carl Sigman) - 5:14
5. "Voodoo" - 2:48
6. "My All" (Giuffre, Russell) - 4:09
7. "That's the Way It Is" - 3:45
8. "Crawdad Suite" - 7:10
9. "The Train and the River" - 3:31

All songs written by Jimmy Giuffre unless otherwise noted.

== Personnel ==
- Jimmy Giuffre - clarinet, tenor saxophone, baritone saxophone
- Ralph Peña - bass
- Jim Hall - guitar
