= Jerry Zigmont =

American jazz trombonist

Background information
- Born: Gerald George Zigmont; February 24, 1958 (age 67); Bridgeport, Connecticut, U.S.
- Genres: jazz
- Occupation: trombonist
- Instrument: Trombone
- Years active: 1980–present
- Labels: Sony
- Member of: Woody Allen & His New Orleans Jazz Band
- Website: www.JerryZigmont.com

Jerry Zigmont (born Gerald George Zigmont on February 24, 1958) is a New Orleans-style jazz trombonist. While growing up in Connecticut, Jerry began his musical studies at the age of 12. He performed in a variety of marching bands, drum corps, jazz bands, brass quintets, classical orchestras, and later earned degrees in Performance and Music Education at the University of Connecticut.

Beginning in the early 1980s, Zigmont "cut his teeth" playing club dates and concerts in regional jazz groups throughout New England. In 1987 he began an association with the celebrated British clarinetist, Sammy Rimington which resulted in a series of recordings and tours. Jerry's rousing style has been featured with many noted New Orleans jazz musicians including Doc Cheatham, Percy Humphrey and Arvell Shaw.

Jerry Zigmont is a regular member of Woody Allen and his New Orleans Jazz Band which plays every Monday evening at Manhattan's Carlyle Hotel. His trombone playing is steeped in the classic New Orleans tradition, with its trademark raw power and "straight from the heart" approach. He appears on the soundtrack of the documentary film Wild Man Blues (directed by Barbara Kopple) which documents a 1996 European tour by Allen and his band. Zigmont has performed extensively with the group in Europe, South America, Turkey and Greece.

== Gallery ==
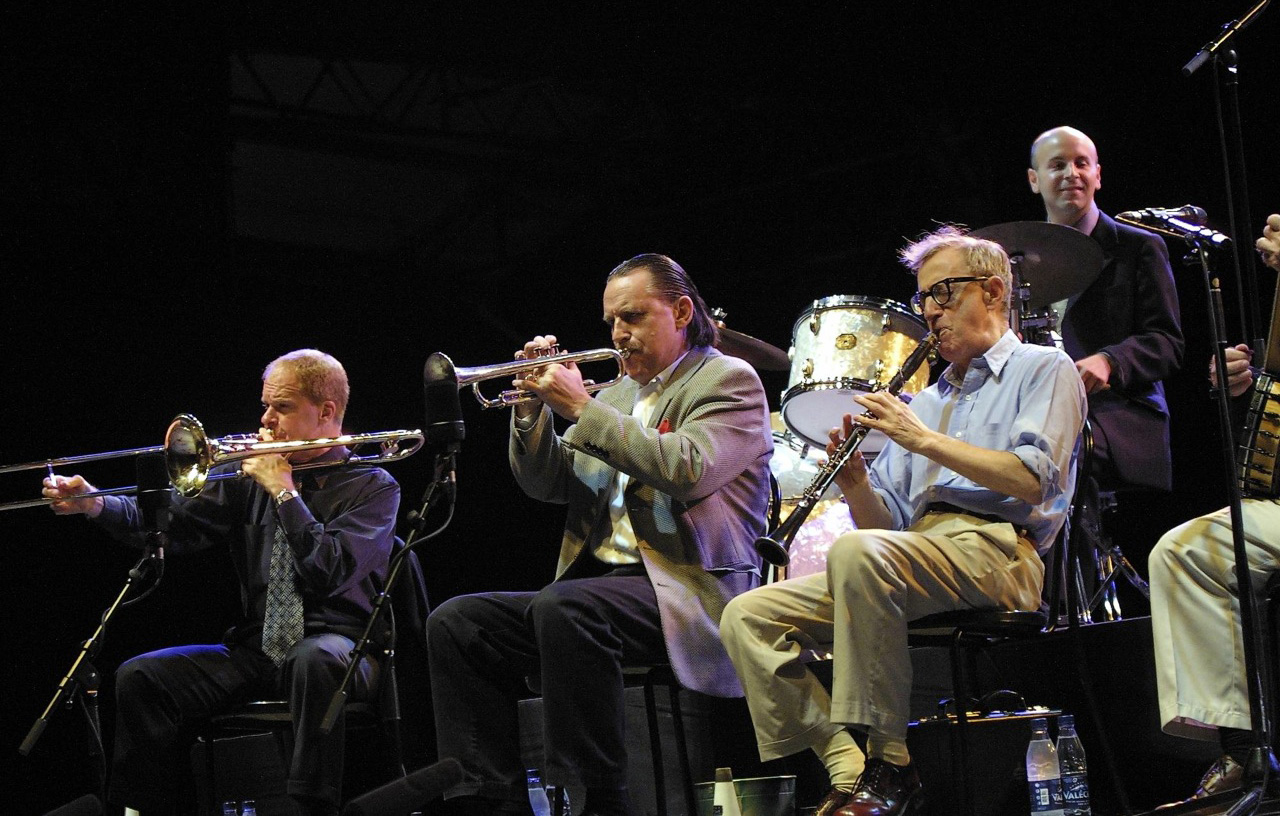
Woody Allen with Jerry Zigmont and Simon Wettenhall performing at Vienne Jazz Festival, Vienne, France.
