= Carol Chaikin =

- Born: Los Angeles, California, U.S.
- Genres: Jazz
- Occupations: Musician, composer
- Instruments: Alto saxophone, flute
- Years active: 1990s–2000s
- Labels: Gold Castle
- Website: carolchaikin.com

Carol Chaikin is an American jazz instrumentalist and composer. She attended Berklee College of Music. Her eponymous first album was released in 1990 by Gold Castle Records.

== Early life and education ==
Chaikin was born in Los Angeles. She attended Berklee College of Music, studying flute and alto saxophone under Joe Viola, graduating in 1980. She lived and worked in New York City for sixteen years. She performs with the York Quartet and as a freelance musician in Los Angeles.

== Discography ==
- Carol Chaikin (Gold Castle, 1990)
- Lucy's Day Off (1998)
