= Erna Yuzbashyan =

- Born: December 16, 1958 (age 67); Yerevan, Armenia, USSR
- Genres: Pop, Jazz
- Years active: 1980–present

Erna Yuzbashyan (Armenian: Էռնա Յուզբաշյան) (born, December 16, 1958) is an Armenian pop and jazz singer and an honorary artist of Armenia.

== Early life ==
Yuzbashyan was born in 1958 in Yerevan, Armenia. She first appeared on stage at age 16 as a soloist of state jazz quartet "Gaya". She lived in Baku until she reached 20.

In 1979 she graduated from state musical college in Baku. After receiving her higher education she returned to Yerevan.

== Career ==
In 1980 she performed with the "Serpantin" vocal-instrumental ensemble in Ukraine and Moldova. She collaborated with Armenian composer Robert Amirkhanyan and participated in many competitions and festivals. In 1982 she performed at the Armenian State Musical Orchestra led by Konstantin Orbelyan.

In 1984 she began to perform as a solo singer. In 1988 she was invited to teach vocals at Yerevan State Jazz College. In 1991 she was invited to work at State Song Theater of Armenia led by National Artist of Armenia Arthur Grigoryan.

In 1994 she relocated to Los Angeles, California, for permanent residence. She continued to work as a singer and to actively participate in cultural life of the Armenian and Russian diaspora while collaborating with Armenian composers and singers.

In 2010 she performed at concerts in Yerevan (Opera and Ballet National Academic Theater after Alexander Spendiaryan) with the slogan "Only For You" and in Gyumri. In 2013 she had a solo concert entitled "The One" and represented the day of Pop songs during "Music Week In Yerevan" held by Emil Karat. In 2015 she celebrated 35 years on stage with a solo concert in Gyumri, Stepanakert, as well as releasing her album The Best.

== Musical awards ==
- 1981 - First prize winner at the All-Union Contest of Young Performers of Soviet Song, Dnepropetrovsk.
- 1981 - Laureate, second prize at the international competition "Red Carnation", Sochi.
- 1981 - Laureate of the All-Union Television Song Festival "Song 81"
- 1985 - Laureate of the All-Union Television Song Festival "Song 85"
- 1987 - Laureate, third prize at the Intervision contest in Belgrade "Places 87"
- 1989 - Lenin Komsomoluh of Armenia for the Soviet Socialist Republic
- 2015 - Honorary artist of Armenia.

== Musical film ==
- Songs of Love. Studio for TV films "Yerevan", 1983.

== Discography ==
=== Singles ===
- 1982 «Red carnation-81»

«Вставайте» ("Get up"). Firm "Melody". Vinyl record.

- 1981 "The horizon". No. 10. «Улыбнись» ("Smile").
- 1982 Erna Yuzbashyan.

«Вставайте» ("Get up"), «Улыбнись» ("Smile"). Firm "Melody". Mignon flexible.

- 1982 "The horizon" N5 (8). Ensemble "Krunk" (Armenia).

"Maral. Dream "(folk songs)

- 1983 "STATE ARTISTIC ARTS ORCHESTRA OF ARMENIA" (artistic director K.Orbelian). Firm "Melody". Phonograph.

«Улыбнись» ("Smile"), «Сто часов счастья» ("Hundred Hours of Happiness")

- 2004 Konstantin Orbelian "MY PEOPLE"

«Уезжают друзья и любимые» ("Friends and loved ones are leaving"), «Я собрала твою любовь» ("I collected your love"), «Вокализ» ("Vocalise")

=== Albums ===
Year	Title
2011	Love night
2015	The Best

=== Music videos ===
Release Year	Song Title	Director
1983	«Մեղեդի» ("Melody)	USSR
1988	Vanir Indz	Hrant Movsisyan
2005	«Ինչպես մի աստղ» ("Like a star")	Hrant Vardanyan
2005	«Մեղեդի» ("Melody")	Hrach Keshishyan
2007	«Սիրո գիշեր» ("Love night")	Arman Aghajanyan
2008	"Уезжают друзья и любимые"	
2008	"Я собрала твою любовь"	
2009	«Գիտեմ» ("I know")	Arman Aghajanyan
2009	«Այն չեմ»	Arman Aghajanyan
2010	«Երանում եմ»	Hrant Movsisyan
