= The Four Brothers Sound =

Studio album by Jimmy Giuffre
- Released: 1959
- Recorded: June 23 & 25 and September 1, 1958; Atlantic Studios, NYC and Lenox, MA
- Genre: Jazz
- Label: Atlantic; LP 1295
- Producer: Nesuhi Ertegun

Jimmy Giuffre chronology
Trav'lin' Light (1958)	The Four Brothers Sound (1959)	Western Suite (1958)

The Four Brothers Sound is an album by American jazz composer and arranger Jimmy Giuffre, released on the Atlantic label in 1959. The album features Giuffre's tenor saxophone overdubbed four times to recreate the distinctive sound of Woody Herman's "Four Brothers" band.

== Reception ==
Professional ratings
Review scores
Source	Rating
Allmusic	4/5 stars

Brandon Burke of Allmusic writes: "The effect of this overdubbing process is, while sonically challenging, unlikely to alienate listeners who are not fully immersed in experimental jazz... ''Four Brothers Sound is proof that the term avant-garde needn't always be associated with harsh dissonance. This is a very enjoyable set".

== Track listing ==
All compositions by Jimmy Giuffre except as indicated

1. "Four Brothers" - 3:23
2. "Ode to Switzerland" - 4:44
3. "Blues in the Barn" - 4:46
4. "Space" - 3:31
5. "I Gotta Right to Sing the Blues" (Harold Arlen, Ted Koehler) - 3:26
6. "Come Rain or Come Shine" (Arlen, Johnny Mercer) - 2:07
7. "Memphis in June" (Hoagy Carmichael, Paul Francis Webster) - 3:31
8. "Cabin in the Sky" (Vernon Duke, John La Touche) - 2:57
9. "Old Folks" (Dedette Lee Hill, Willard Robison) - 2:22
- Recorded at Atlantic Studios, NYC on June 23, 1958 (track 6), June 25, 1958 (track 2) and Lenox, MA on September 1, 1958 (tracks 1, 3–5 & 7–9)

== Personnel ==
- Jimmy Giuffre - tenor saxophone
- Jim Hall - guitar (tracks 1, 3–5 & 7–9)
- Bob Brookmeyer - piano (tracks 1, 3–5 & 7–9)
