= Jimmy Giuffre =

American jazz clarinetist, saxophonist, composer, and arranger (1921–2008)

Background information
- Born: James Peter Giuffre; April 26, 1921; Dallas, Texas, U.S.
- Died: April 24, 2008 (aged 86) Pittsfield, Massachusetts, U.S.
- Genres: Jazz; free jazz; West Coast jazz; cool jazz; folk jazz; chamber jazz; third stream
- Occupations: Musician; composer; arranger
- Instruments: Clarinet; tenor saxophone; baritone saxophone
- Years active: 1940s–1990s
- Labels: Capitol; Atlantic; Verve; Choice; Soul Note; CELP

James Peter Giuffre (/ˈdʒuːfreɪ/ JOO-fray, Italian: [dʒufˈfrɛ]; April 26, 1921 – April 24, 2008) was an American jazz clarinetist, saxophonist, composer, and arranger. He is known for developing forms of jazz which allowed for free interplay between the musicians, anticipating forms of free improvisation.

== Biography ==
Jimmy Giuffre was born in Dallas, Texas, the son of Joseph Francis Giuffre (an Italian immigrant from Termini Imerese, Palermo, Sicily) and Everet McDaniel Giuffre. Giuffre was a graduate of Dallas Technical High School and North Texas State Teachers College (University of North Texas College of Music). He first became known as an arranger for Woody Herman's big band, for which he wrote "Four Brothers" (1947). He would continue to write creative, unusual arrangements throughout his career. He was a central figure in West Coast jazz and cool jazz. He became a member of Howard Rumsey's Lighthouse All Stars in 1951 as a full-time All Star, along with Shorty Rogers and Shelly Manne. The Lighthouse in Hermosa Beach, California became the focal point of West Coast jazz in the 1952–53 period. During this time, he collaborated with Rogers on many of the charts written for the All Stars. The first recording released by the Lighthouse All Stars was a not so West Coast jazz chart named "Big Boy", which he and Rogers had put together. It was an instant hit in Los Angeles. He left the band in September 1953 and became a member of Shorty Rogers and His Giants before going solo. At this point in his career, Giuffre predominantly played tenor and baritone saxophone.

His first trio consisted of Giuffre, guitarist Jim Hall and double bassist Ralph Peña (later replaced by Jim Atlas). They had a minor hit in 1957 when Giuffre's "The Train and the River" was featured on the television special The Sound of Jazz. This trio explored what Giuffre dubbed "blues-based folk jazz". This same special matched Giuffre with fellow clarinetist Pee Wee Russell for a leisurely jam session simply titled "Blues".

When Atlas left the trio, Giuffre replaced him with valve trombonist Bob Brookmeyer. This unusual instrumentation was partly inspired by Aaron Copland. The group can be seen performing "The Train and the River" in the film Jazz on a Summer's Day filmed at the 1958 Newport Jazz Festival.

In 1959, Giuffre led a trio featuring Hall and bassist Buddy Clark on a concert in Rome, Italy, sharing the bill with Gerry Mulligan's band.

In 1961, Giuffre formed a new trio with pianist Paul Bley and Steve Swallow on double bass, and began to focus his attention largely on the clarinet. This group received little attention while active, but were later cited by some critics and musicians as among the most important groups in jazz history. They explored free jazz not in the aggressive mode of Albert Ayler or Archie Shepp, but with a hushed, quiet focus closer to chamber music. The trio's explorations of melody, harmony and rhythm are still as striking and radical as any in jazz. Thom Jurek has written that this trio's recordings are "one of the most essential documents regarding the other side of early-'60s jazz."

Giuffre, Bley and Swallow eventually explored wholly improvised music, several years ahead of the free improvisation boom in Europe. Jurek writes that Free Fall, their final record, "was such radical music, no one, literally no one, was ready for it and the group disbanded shortly thereafter on a night when they made only 35 cents apiece for a set."

In the early 1970s, Giuffre formed a new trio with bassist Kiyoshi Tokunaga and drummer Randy Kaye. Giuffre added instruments including bass flute and soprano saxophone to his arsenal. A later group included Pete Levin playing synthesizer and replaced Tokunaga with electric bassist Bob Nieske. This group recorded three albums for the Italian Soul Note label.

During the 1970s, Giuffre was hired by New York University to head its jazz ensemble, and to teach private lessons in saxophone and music composition. He also taught jazz improvisation at Manhattanville College.

Into the 1990s, Giuffre continued teaching and performing. He recorded with Joe McPhee, and revived the trio with Bley and Swallow (though Swallow had switched to bass guitar, giving the group a different sound). Through the mid-1990s, Giuffre taught at the New England Conservatory of Music. He suffered from Parkinson's disease and in his last years he no longer performed. Giuffre died of pneumonia in Pittsfield, Massachusetts, on April 24, 2008, two days short of his 87th birthday.

== Discography ==
=== As leader/co-leader ===
- 1955: Jimmy Giuffre (Capitol)
- 1955: Tangents in Jazz (Capitol)
- 1956: The Jimmy Giuffre Clarinet (Atlantic)
- 1956: The Jimmy Giuffre 3 (Atlantic)
- 1958: The Music Man (Atlantic)
- 1958: Trav'lin' Light (Atlantic)
- 1958: The Four Brothers Sound (Atlantic)
- 1958: Western Suite (Atlantic)
- 1959: Ad Lib (Verve)
- 1959: 7 Pieces (Verve)
- 1959: Herb Ellis Meets Jimmy Giuffre (Verve) with Herb Ellis
- 1959: Lee Konitz Meets Jimmy Giuffre (Verve) with Lee Konitz
- 1959: The Easy Way (Verve)
- 1959: Piece for Clarinet and String Orchestra/Mobiles (Verve) with the Sudwestfunk Orchestra of Baden Baden
- 1959: Princess (Fini Jazz) Italian release – recorded at Adriano Theatre, Rome, Italy, June 19, 1959
- 1960: The Jimmy Giuffre Quartet in Person (Verve)
- 1961: Fusion (Verve)
- 1961: Thesis (Verve), re-released with Fusion and three additional tracks as 1961 (ECM, 1992)
- 1961: Emphasis, Stuttgart 1961 (hatArt, 1993), with Steve Swallow, Paul Bley
- 1961: Flight, Bremen 1961 (hatArt, 1993) re-issued with Emphasis... as Emphasis & Flight (hatOLOGY, 2003)
- 1961: Graz Live 1961 (Hathut / ezz-thetics 2019) with Steve Swallow, Paul Bley
- 1963: Free Fall (Columbia)
- 1965: New York Concerts: The Jimmy Giuffre 3 & 4 (2014)
- 1973: Music for People, Birds, Butterflies and Mosquitoes (Choice) also released as Mosquito Dance (DJM) and Night Dance (Candid)
- 1975: River Chant (Choice) also released as Mosquito Dance (DJM) and The Train and the River (Candid)
- 1978: IAI Festival (Improvising Artists), with Lee Konitz, Bill Connors and Paul Bley
- 1983: Dragonfly (Soul Note)
- 1985: Quasar (Soul Note)
- 1988: Eiffel: Live in Paris (CELP), with André Jaume
- 1988: Momentum, Willisau 1988 (hatOLOGY, 1997), with André Jaume
- 1989: Liquid Dancers (Soul Note)
- 1990: The Life of a Trio: Saturday (Owl), with Steve Swallow, Paul Bley
- 1990: The Life of a Trio: Sunday (Owl), with Steve Swallow, Paul Bley
- 1991: River Station (CELP), with André Jaume and Joe McPhee
- 1992: Talks & Plays (CELP, 2000), CD with interview and a second CD with André Jaume
- 1992: Fly Away Little Bird (Owl), with Steve Swallow, Paul Bley
- 1996: Conversations with a Goose (Soul Note), with Steve Swallow, Paul Bley

=== As sideman, arranger and/or composer ===
- Chet Baker and the Lighthouse All-Stars – Witch Doctor (Contemporary, 1953 [1985])
- Chet Baker – Pretty/Groovy (World Pacific, 1954 [1958])
- Elmer Bernstein – The Man with the Golden Arm (Decca, 1956)
- Paul Bley – Quiet Song (Improvising Artists, 1975)
- Buddy Bregman – Swinging Kicks (Verve, 1956)
- Bob Brookmeyer – Traditionalism Revisited (World Pacific, 1957)
- Ray Brown – Bass Hit! (Verve, 1956)
- Teddy Charles – The Teddy Charles Tentet (Atlantic, 1956)
- Teddy Charles / Shorty Rogers / Shelly Manne / Jimmy Giuffre – Collaboration West (Prestige, 1953 [1956]) Evolution (Prestige, 1953 [1957])
- Peggy Connelly – That Old Black Magic (Bethlehem, 1956)
- Buddy DeFranco – The Progressive Mr. DeFranco (Norgran, 1953 [1954], reissued as Odalisque - The Music Of Buddy DeFranco, Norgran, 1956 & Verve, 1961)
- Herb Ellis – Ellis in Wonderland (Verve, 1956)
- Stan Kenton – Popular Favorites by Stan Kenton (Capitol, 1953)
- Lee Konitz – You and Lee, Arranged and conducted by Jimmy Giuffre (Verve, 1959), Giuffre does not play
- John Lewis – The Wonderful World of Jazz (Atlantic, 1960), credited as "James Rivers", Essence (Atlantic, 1962)
- Shelly Manne & His Men – The West Coast Sound (Contemporary, 1953), Giuffre plays baritone saxophone and arranges one tune
- Shelly Manne – The Three & The Two (Contemporary, 1954)
- Helen Merrill – The Artistry of Helen Merrill (Mainstream, 1965)
- Modern Jazz Quartet – The Modern Jazz Quartet at Music Inn (Atlantic, 1956)
- Lennie Niehaus – Lennie Niehaus, Vol. 3 - The Octet, #2 (Contemporary, 1955), with Niehaus Giuffre plays baritone saxophone
- Lennie Niehaus – Lennie Niehaus, Vol. 5 - The Sextet (Contemporary, 1955)
- Anita O'Day – Pick Yourself Up (Verve, 1958)
- Anita O'Day – Cool Heat, Arrangements by Jimmy Giuffre (Verve, 1959)
- Shorty Rogers – Modern Sounds (Capitol, 1951)
- Shorty Rogers – Shorty Rogers and His Giants (RCA Victor, 1953)
- Shorty Rogers – Cool and Crazy (RCA Victor, 1953) also released as The Big Shorty Rogers Express
- Shorty Rogers – Shorty Rogers Courts the Count (RCA Victor, 1954)
- Shorty Rogers and André Previn – Collaboration (RCA Victor, 1954)
- Shorty Rogers – The Swinging Mr. Rogers (Atlantic, 1955)
- Shorty Rogers – Martians Stay Home (Atlantic, 1955 [1980])
- Shorty Rogers – Martians Come Back! (Atlantic, 1955 [1956])
- Shorty Rogers – Way Up There (Atlantic, 1955 [1957])
- Shorty Rogers – Wherever the Five Winds Blow (RCA Victor, 1956 [1957])
- Shorty Rogers – Shorty Rogers Plays Richard Rodgers (RCA Victor, 1957)
- Shorty Rogers – The Wizard of Oz and Other Harold Arlen Songs (RCA Victor, 1959)
- Shorty Rogers – The Swingin' Nutcracker (RCA Victor, 1960)
- Pete Rugolo – Introducing Pete Rugolo (Columbia, 1954)
- Pete Rugolo – Adventures in Rhythm (Columbia, 1954)
- Pete Rugolo – Rugolomania (Columbia, 1955)
- Pete Rugolo – New Sounds by Pete Rugolo (Harmony, 1954–55, [1957])
- Pete Rugolo – Out on a Limb (EmArcy, 1956)
- Bill Russo / Shorty Rogers / Shelly Manne / Jimmy Giuffre – Jazz Composers Workshop (Savoy, 1952)
- Howard Rumsey's Lighthouse All-Stars, Vol. 3 (Contemporary, 1952), in this band Giuffre plays tenor saxophone
- Howard Rumsey's Lighthouse All-Stars – Sunday Jazz à la Lighthouse, Vol. 1 & 2 (Contemporary, 1953)
- Sonny Stitt – Sonny Stitt Plays Jimmy Giuffre Arrangements (Verve, 1959)
- Duane Tatro – Jazz for Moderns (Contemporary, 1954–55), Giuffre plays baritone saxophone

== See also ==
- List of jazz arrangers
