= Ronaldo Folegatti =

Brazilian musician

Ronaldo Folegatti (April 30, 1958, Rio de Janeiro – August 1, 2007, Teresópolis) was a Brazilian composer, guitarist, and record producer.

Folegatti started playing the guitar at age 10. He studied mathematics and received a master's degree in science.

When he was twenty-two, he moved to Germany and started a career in music. He released his first album, Sound of Watercolors, in Germany in 1990. He recorded his second album, Lust, Comics & Some Other Dreams, with Till Brönner and Ronnie Stevenson. The album crossed several genres: jazz, big band, free jazz, and Brazilian. In 1995 he moved to Brazil. Five years later two more albums came out, Mazy Tales and Anjos & Estrellas.

In 2005 he released Jamming!, with guest appearances by Randy Brecker, Will Lee, Joel Rosenblatt Zé Canuto, Teo Lima, Marcelo Martins, and Ada Rovatti. During the next two years he was treated for cancer. He died in 2007, leaving four albums unfinished and unreleased.

== Discography ==
- Sounds of Watercolors (Blue Orchid, 1991)
- Lust, Comics & Some Other Dreams (Blue Orchid, 1992)
- Mazy Tales (Folegatti, 2000)
- Anjos & Estrellas (Folegatti, 2000)
- Histórias de Beijos (Folegatti, 2002)
- Jamming! (Apria, 2005)
