= Western Suite =

Studio album by Jimmy Giuffre
- Released: Late June/early July 1960
- Recorded: December 3, 1958; Atlantic Studios, NYC and Lenox, MA
- Genre: Jazz
- Label: Atlantic; LP 1330
- Producer: Nesuhi Ertegun

Jimmy Giuffre chronology
The Four Brothers Sound (1958)	Western Suite (1960)	Ad Lib (1959)

Western Suite is an album by American jazz composer and arranger Jimmy Giuffre which was released on the Atlantic label in 1960.

Featuring an unusual trio of clarinet, guitar and valve trombone, the first half of Western Suite is devoted to Giuffre's country music/folk-inspired suite, while the second half features a lengthy and abstract version of the big band standard "Topsy" and a Thelonious Monk song.

== Reception ==
Professional ratings
Review scores
Source	Rating
Allmusic	4/5 stars
DownBeat	4/5 stars
The Penguin Guide to Jazz Recordings	4/4 stars

Thom Jurek of Allmusic states: "Giuffre, ever the storyteller, advanced the improvisation angle and wrote his score so that each player had to stand on his own as part of the group; there were no comfort zones. Without a rhythm section, notions of interval, extensions, interludes, and so on were out the window. He himself played some of his most retrained yet adventurous solos in the confines of this trio and within the form of this suite. It swung like West Coast jazz, but felt as ambitious as Copland's Billy the Kid".

In his 1961 review for DownBeat, Ira Gitler says, "The interaction among the three is remarkable" and concludes: "What is found in this set are lyricism and depth of emotion."

== Track listing ==
All compositions by Jimmy Giuffre except as indicated

1. "Western Suite"
  1. "First Movement: Pony Express" - 5:56
  2. "Second Movement: Apaches" - 4:18
  3. "Third Movement: Saturday Night Dance" - 2:56
  4. "Fourth Movement: Big Pow Wow" - 4:28
2. "Topsy" (Edgar Battle, Eddie Durham) - 11:28
3. "Blue Monk" (Thelonious Monk) - 8:16

== Personnel ==
- Jimmy Giuffre - clarinet (1-3, 2, 3), tenor saxophone (1-1, 1-4), baritone saxophone (1-2)
- Jim Hall - guitar
- Bob Brookmeyer - valve trombone
