= Jesse McGuire =

American musician

Jesse McGuire (born August 29, 1958) is an American trumpeter from Phoenix, Arizona, famous for his execution of the Star Spangled Banner, which he has performed for three U.S. presidents, and at many major sporting events, most notably the 2000 Daytona 500, Duralube 500 at Phoenix International Raceway 2001, game 7 of the 2001 World Series, the 2010 NBA Playoffs game between the Los Angeles Lakers and the Phoenix Suns, a January 30, 2012 game between the Dallas Mavericks and the Phoenix Suns, the 2014 NFL Playoff game between the Panthers and the 49ers, and the 2018 Philadelphia Eagles Super Bowl Parade. On September 21, 2026, McGuire's trumpet malfunctioned while performing before the Arizona Diamondbacks vs. New York Yankees baseball game. Immediately following the malfunction, he continued to sing the remainder of the Star Spangled Banner, impressing the audience with quick thinking and his singing ability.

McGuire was lead trumpeter for the Lincoln Center Jazz Orchestra of New York City and for the band Tower of Power. He toured worldwide with many acts including Tower of Power and Wynton Marsalis.
