= Big Band Jazz from the Summit =

Live album by Louis Bellson
- Released: 1962
- Recorded: January 22, 23 & 24, 1962
- Venue: The Summit, Los Angeles, CA
- Genre: Jazz
- Label: Roulette; SR 52087
- Producer: Teddy Reig

Louis Bellson chronology
Louis Bellson Swings Jule Styne (1960)	Big Band Jazz from the Summit (1962)	Happy Sounds (1962)

Big Band Jazz from the Summit is a live album by American jazz drummer Louis Bellson featuring performances recorded in Los Angeles in 1962 for the Roulette label.

== Reception ==
Professional ratings
Review scores
Source	Rating
AllMusic	3/5 stars

AllMusic awarded the album 3 stars.

== Track listing ==
All compositions by Benny Carter except as indicated

1. "Who's Who" - 2:24
2. "Cool" (Leonard Bernstein) - 4:46
3. "Amoroso" - 3:29
4. "Prelude" (George Williams) - 3:22
5. "Gumshoe" - 4:05
6. "Blitzen" (Leonard Feather) - 3:04
7. "St. Louie" (Marty Paich) - 2:29
8. "The Moon Is Low" (Arthur Freed, Nacio Herb Brown) – 3:24
9. "Doozy" - 3:04
10. "Lou’s Blues" - 3:40
11. "With Bells On" (Shorty Rogers) - 3:22
12. "The Diplomat Speaks" (Louis Bellson) - 4:35
- Recorded live at The Summit, 6507 Sunset Blvd. Hollywood, CA on January 22 (tracks 1, 3, 4, 8 & 12), January 23 (tracks 5, 6 & 9) and January 24 (tracks 2, 7, 10 & 11), 1962

== Personnel ==
- Louis Bellson – drums
- John Audino, Conte Candoli, Frank Huggins, Al Porcino (tracks 2, 7, 10 & 11), Uan Rasey (tracks 5, 6 & 9), Ray Triscari (tracks 1, 3, 4 & 8), Jimmy Zito - trumpet
- Arthur Maebe - French horn
- Nick Di Maio, Mike Barone - trombones
- Ernie Tack - bass trombone
- Red Callender - tuba
- Joe Maini, Willie Green - alto saxophone
- Bill Perkins, Carrington Visor - tenor saxophone
- Teddy Lee - baritone saxophone
- Gene Estes - vibraphone, boobam
- Tony Rizzi - guitar
- Lou Levy - piano
- Jimmy Bond - bass
- Benny Carter (tracks 1, 3, 5, 6, 8, 9 & 10), Bob Florence (track 12), Marty Paich (tracks 2 & 7), Shorty Rogers (track 11) and George Williams (track 4) - arranger
