= Gigi in Jazz =

Studio album by Shorty Rogers and His Giants
- Released: 1958
- Recorded: January 27 & 30, 1958; Los Angeles, CA
- Genre: Jazz
- Length: 36:47
- Label: RCA Victor

Shorty Rogers chronology
St. Louis Blues (1958)	Gigi in Jazz (1958)	Afro-Cuban Influence (1958)

Gigi in Jazz is an album by American jazz trumpeter and arranger Shorty Rogers performing jazz adaptations of songs composed by Frederick Loewe and Alan Jay Lerner for the film Gigi which was released by RCA Victor in 1958.

== Reception ==
Professional ratings
Review scores
Source	Rating
Allmusic	4/5 stars
The Penguin Guide to Jazz Recordings	3/4 stars

Allmusic awarded the album 4 stars.

== Track listing ==
All compositions by Frederick Loewe and Alan Jay Lerner.

1. "The Night They Invented Champagne" - 4:04
2. "I Remember It Well" - 5:00
3. "I'm Glad I'm Not Young Anymore" - 3:32
4. "She's Not Thinking of Me" - 6:05
5. "Say a Prayer for Me Tonight" - 4:50
6. "It's a Bore" - 4:54
7. "Thank Heaven for Little Girls" - 3:49
8. "Gigi" - 4:33
- Recorded in Los Angeles, CA on January 27, 1958 (tracks 2, 3, 5 & 7) and January 30, 1958 (tracks 1, 4, 6 & 8)

== Personnel ==
- Shorty Rogers - trumpet, flugelhorn, arranger
- Bill Holman - tenor saxophone
- Pete Jolly - piano
- Larry Bunker - vibraphone
- Buddy Clark (tracks 1, 4, 6 & 8), Ralph Peña (tracks 2, 3, 5 & 7) - bass
- Mel Lewis - drums
