= Gigi (1958 film) =

1958 film by Vincente Minnelli

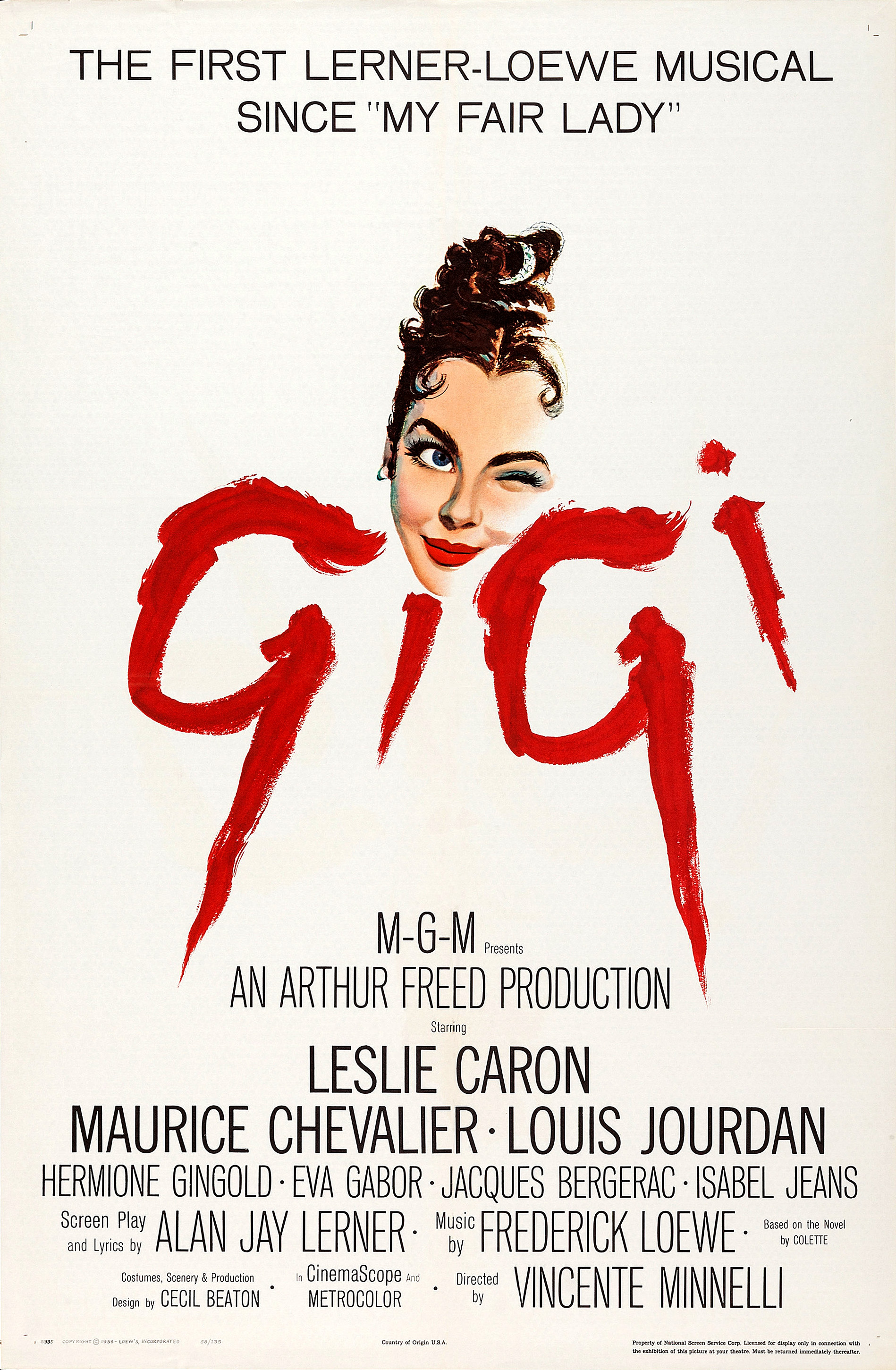
- Theatrical release poster
- Directed by: Vincente Minnelli
- Screenplay by: Alan Jay Lerner
- Based on: Gigi; 1944 novella by Colette
- Produced by: Arthur Freed
- Starring: Leslie Caron; Maurice Chevalier; Louis Jourdan; Hermione Gingold; Eva Gabor; Jacques Bergerac; Isabel Jeans
- Cinematography: Joseph Ruttenberg
- Edited by: Adrienne Fazan
- Music by: Frederick Loewe; Music adapted and conducted by André Previn
- Distributed by: Metro-Goldwyn-Mayer
- Release date: May 15, 1958
- Running time: 115 minutes
- Country: United States
- Language: English
- Budget: $3.3 million
- Box office: $13.2 million

Gigi (French pronunciation: [ʒiʒi]) is a 1958 American musical romantic comedy film directed by Vincente Minnelli and processed using Metro-Goldwyn-Mayer's Eastmancolor film process Metrocolor. The screenplay by Alan Jay Lerner is based on the 1944 novella by Colette. The film features songs with lyrics by Lerner and music by Frederick Loewe, arranged and conducted by André Previn. Costume design was done by Cecil Beaton (hats by Madame Paulette).

At the 31st Academy Awards, the film won all nine of its nominations, including Best Picture and Best Director for Minnelli. It held the record for the highest clean sweep of nominations (later shared with The Last Emperor) until The Lord of the Rings: The Return of the King won all eleven of its nominations at the 76th Academy Awards in 2004.

In 1991, Gigi was selected for preservation in the United States National Film Registry by the Library of Congress as being "culturally, historically, or aesthetically significant". The American Film Institute ranked it number 35 in AFI's 100 Years...100 Passions. The film is considered the last great Metro-Goldwyn-Mayer musical and the final great achievement of the Freed Unit, headed by producer Arthur Freed.

== Plot ==
The film is set in the year 1900, during the Belle Époque at the turn of the 20th century. While in the Bois de Boulogne, Honoré Lachaille remarks that in Paris, marriage is not the sole option for wealthy young bon vivants like his nephew Gaston, who is bored with life. Gaston does enjoy spending time with Madame Alvarez and her granddaughter, precocious, carefree Gilberte, affectionately known as Gigi. Gigi's mother (a singer who is heard but never seen onscreen) leaves her care mostly to Madame Alvarez.

Following the "family tradition", Madame Alvarez regularly sends Gigi to her sister and Gigi's great-aunt, Alicia, to be groomed as a courtesan, a kept mistress of wealthy men. Gigi learns proper etiquette and charm but disdains the trivial love between a man and his mistress. She prefers to have fun with Gaston, whom she regards as an older brother or a young uncle.

Like his uncle, Gaston is a known wealthy womanizer in Parisian high society. When his latest mistress has an affair with her ice-skating instructor, Gaston publicly humiliates her, resulting in her fake attempted suicide. Gaston plans to retreat to the country, but his uncle insists that he remain in Paris and attend even more parties.

While playing cards with Gaston, Gigi wagers that if he loses, he must take her and her grandmother to the seaside for the weekend. Gaston loses the bet, and the three travel to Trouville. While Gaston and Gigi have fun together, Honoré and Madame Alvarez unexpectedly reunite and reminisce about their once-passionate affair.

When Gaston goes to Monte Carlo, Great-Aunt Alicia and Madame Alvarez scheme to turn Gigi into Gaston's mistress. Though initially dubious, Madame Alvarez agrees to Gigi being intensively trained before Gaston's return. Gigi accepts this as pre-destined.

When Gaston returns, he is discomfited when Gigi shows off her new womanly gown. Gaston insults the dress, preferring her juvenile outfits; Gigi mocks his taste in clothes. Offended, Gaston storms out, then realizes his folly and returns to apologize. He offers to take Gigi to tea at the Reservoir, but Madame Alvarez tells him that an unchaperoned Gigi being seen in public with him could damage her reputation.

Angered, Gaston storms out again. He reflects on Gigi, realizing he has developed a romantic desire for her. Although hesitant due to her young age, Gaston realizes that he loves Gigi. He proposes a generous "business arrangement" to Madame Alvarez and Aunt Alicia for Gigi to become his mistress. Gigi refuses, telling Gaston she does not seek celebrity status, only to eventually be abandoned by him and become another man's mistress. She wants their relationship to remain platonic, but when Gaston reveals that he is in love with her, Gigi is horrified. She calls Gaston a wicked man for claiming to love her while still proposing this arrangement before fleeing the room in tears. Gaston chastises Madame Alvarez for exposing Gigi to the sordid details of his lifestyle, then leaves. Gigi later sends for Gaston and tells him that she would rather be miserable with him than without him, agreeing to the arrangement.

The couple go to Maxim's restaurant. Gigi performs perfectly as his courtesan, which upsets Gaston. He is disturbed by Gigi's knowledge of society gossip. After presenting her with an expensive emerald bracelet, he grows increasingly uncomfortable with the unrelenting scrutiny being heaped on them. Honoré congratulates Gaston on his new courtesan and remarks that Gigi is so delightful that she will likely keep him amused for months.

Gaston is so disgusted by his uncle's remark, he drags Gigi from the restaurant all the way back home without saying a word while she cries and protests, not understanding what is wrong. After returning Gigi home in tears, he wanders the dark streets of Paris in silence, only to finally return and asks Madame Alvarez for Gigi's hand in marriage.

The final sequence returns to Honoré Lachaille, who proudly points out Gaston and Gigi getting into a carriage in the Bois de Boulogne: elegant, beautiful, and happily married.

== Cast ==
- Leslie Caron (singing voice dubbed by Betty Wand) as Gilberte "Gigi"
- Maurice Chevalier as Honoré Lachaille
- Louis Jourdan as Gaston Lachaille
- Hermione Gingold as Madame Alvarez ("Mamita")
- Eva Gabor as Liane d'Exelmans
- Jacques Bergerac as Sandomir
- Isabel Jeans as Aunt Alicia
- John Abbott as Manuel
- Marie-Hélène Arnaud as a Maxim's girl

Leslie Caron as Gigi

== Production ==
=== Development ===
Hollywood producer Arthur Freed first proposed a musicalization of the Colette novella to Alan Jay Lerner during the Philadelphia tryout of My Fair Lady in 1956. When Lerner arrived in Hollywood two years later, Freed was battling the Hays Code to bring his tale of a courtesan-in-training to the screen. Another roadblock to the project was the fact Colette's widower had sold the rights to her novella to Gilbert Miller, who planned to produce a film version of the 1954 stage adaptation by Anita Loos. It cost Freed more than $87,000 to purchase the rights from Miller and Loos.

Lerner's songwriting partner Frederick Loewe had expressed no interest in working in Hollywood, so Lerner agreed to write the screenplay only. He and Freed discussed casting; Lerner favored Audrey Hepburn, who had starred in the Broadway production written by Loos, but Freed preferred MGM contract star Leslie Caron, who had co-starred in An American in Paris for him. Both agreed Maurice Chevalier would be ideal for aging boulevardier Honoré Lachaille, and Lerner proposed Dirk Bogarde for Gaston. Lerner agreed to write the lyrics if Freed could convince Bogarde and designer Cecil Beaton to join the project. He decided to approach Loewe once again, and when he suggested they compose the score in Paris, Loewe agreed.

In March 1957, the duo began working in Paris. When Chevalier, who already had agreed to appear in the film, first heard "Thank Heaven for Little Girls", he was delighted. When he discussed his waning interest in wine and women in favor of performing for an audience in cabarets, Chevalier inadvertently inspired the creation of another tune for his character, "I'm Glad I'm Not Young Anymore". The lyrics for another of his songs, the duet "I Remember It Well", performed with Hermione Gingold as his former love Madame Alvarez, were adapted from words Lerner had written for Love Life, a 1948 collaboration with Kurt Weill. "Say a Prayer for Me Tonight", a solo performed by Gigi, had been written for Eliza Doolittle in My Fair Lady but was removed during the pre-Broadway run. Lerner disliked the melody, but Loewe, Freed, and Minnelli voted to include it in the film.

=== Casting ===
Leslie Caron and Louis Jourdan

Lerner recalls that for the film Gigi, "The casting was so haphazard, I don't know how they ever got it on." He wrote the part of Honoré Lachaille for Chevalier, but the rest of the casting was still undecided. Having second thoughts about Audrey Hepburn, Freed asked Lerner to meet with her in Paris, but she declined the role. The producer then asked him to fly to London to speak to Leslie Caron, who was living there with her husband Peter Hall. Lerner was surprised to discover the star had become anglicized to the point of losing her French accent. She had recently starred in an unsuccessful stage production of Gigi, but when she heard Lerner's interpretation of the story greatly differed from that of the play, she accepted his offer. Her singing voice was dubbed by Betty Wand, though Caron filmed mainly to her own tracks (a brief clip of Caron's voice is heard in the DVD extras). Dirk Bogarde expressed interest, as well, but ultimately was unable to free himself from his contract with J. Arthur Rank. Recalling Louis Jourdan from his performance in the 1954 film Three Coins in the Fountain, Freed offered him the role of Gaston.

=== Filming ===
In late April, Freed and Minnelli and their entourages arrived in Paris. The weather had become unseasonably hot, and working in hotel rooms without air-conditioning was uncomfortable. Minnelli began scouting locations while Freed and Lerner discussed the still-incomplete script. Lerner had taken liberties with Colette's novella; the character of Honoré, nonexistent in the original book and very minor in the Loos play, was now a major figure. Gigi's mother, originally a significant character, was reduced to a few lines of dialogue delivered off-screen. Lerner also expanded the focus on Gigi's relationship with her grandmother.

A signature scene was filmed on location at Maxim's, the famous Belle Epoque restaurant with its ornate Art Nouveau mirrored walls. Shooting at the restaurant was a logistical nightmare, as the mirrors reflected lighting equipment, the camera, and other undesirable behind-the-scenes artifacts. Minelli and cinematographer Joseph Ruttenberg worked together to come up with careful camera placements and a low-light visual scheme so that the location could be used without covering up the iconic mirrors. Ruttenberg even managed to cut down on the need for lighting stands and securing lights in corners by attaching lights with suction cups.

By mid-July, the composers had completed most of the score, but still were missing the title tune. Loewe was at the piano while Lerner was indisposed in the bathroom, and when the former began playing a melody the latter liked, he later recalled he jumped up, "[his] trousers still clinging to [his] ankles, and made his way to the living room. 'Play that again,' he said. And that melody ended up being the title song for Gigi."

In September, the cast and crew flew to California, where several interior scenes were filmed, among them a scene in Maxim's, which included a musical number by Jourdan. Lerner was unhappy with the look of the scene as it had been shot by Minnelli, so, at considerable expense, the restaurant was recreated on a soundstage and the scene was reshot by director Charles Walters, since Minnelli was overseas working on a new project.

The film title design uses the artwork of Sem's work from the Belle Époque.

=== Musical numbers ===
1. Overture – Played by MGM Studio Orchestra
2. "Honoré's Soliloquy" – Sung by Maurice Chevalier
3. "Thank Heaven for Little Girls" – Sung by Maurice Chevalier
4. "It's a Bore" – Sung by Maurice Chevalier, Louis Jourdan and John Abbott
5. "The Parisians" – Sung by Betty Wand
6. "The Gossips" – Sung by Maurice Chevalier and MGM Studio Chorus
7. "She is Not Thinking of Me" – Sung by Louis Jourdan
8. "The Night They Invented Champagne" – Sung by Betty Wand, Hermione Gingold and Louis Jourdan
9. "I Remember It Well" – Sung by Maurice Chevalier and Hermione Gingold
10. "Gaston's Soliloquy" – Sung by Louis Jourdan
11. "Gigi" – Sung by Louis Jourdan
12. "I'm Glad I'm Not Young Anymore" – Sung by Maurice Chevalier
13. "Say a Prayer for Me Tonight" – Sung by Betty Wand
14. "Thank Heaven for Little Girls (Reprise)" – Sung by Maurice Chevalier and MGM Studio Chorus

The principal credited orchestrator was Conrad Salinger with vocal arrangements supervised by Robert Tucker. The conductor and general music supervisor was André Previn.

== Release ==
Following completion of the film, it was previewed in Santa Barbara. Audience reaction was overwhelmingly favorable, but Lerner and Loewe were dissatisfied with the result. Lerner felt it was twenty minutes too long and most of the action too slow. The changes he proposed would cost an additional $300,000, money Freed was loath to spend. The songwriting team offered to buy 10% of the film for $300,000, then offered $3 million for the print. Impressed with their belief in the film, MGM executives agreed to the changes, which included eleven days of considerable reshooting, putting the project at $400,000 over budget. At a preview in Encino, audience reaction changed from "appreciation to affection", and Lerner felt the film finally was ready for release. It premiered at the Royale Theatre, a legitimate theatrical venue in New York City, on May 15, 1958.

The film had 10 reserved seat engagements in the United States before opening in selected cities on a continuous run basis from October 2, 1958. The film entered saturation release in the United States with 450 prints on April 1, 1959.

== Reception ==
=== Box office ===
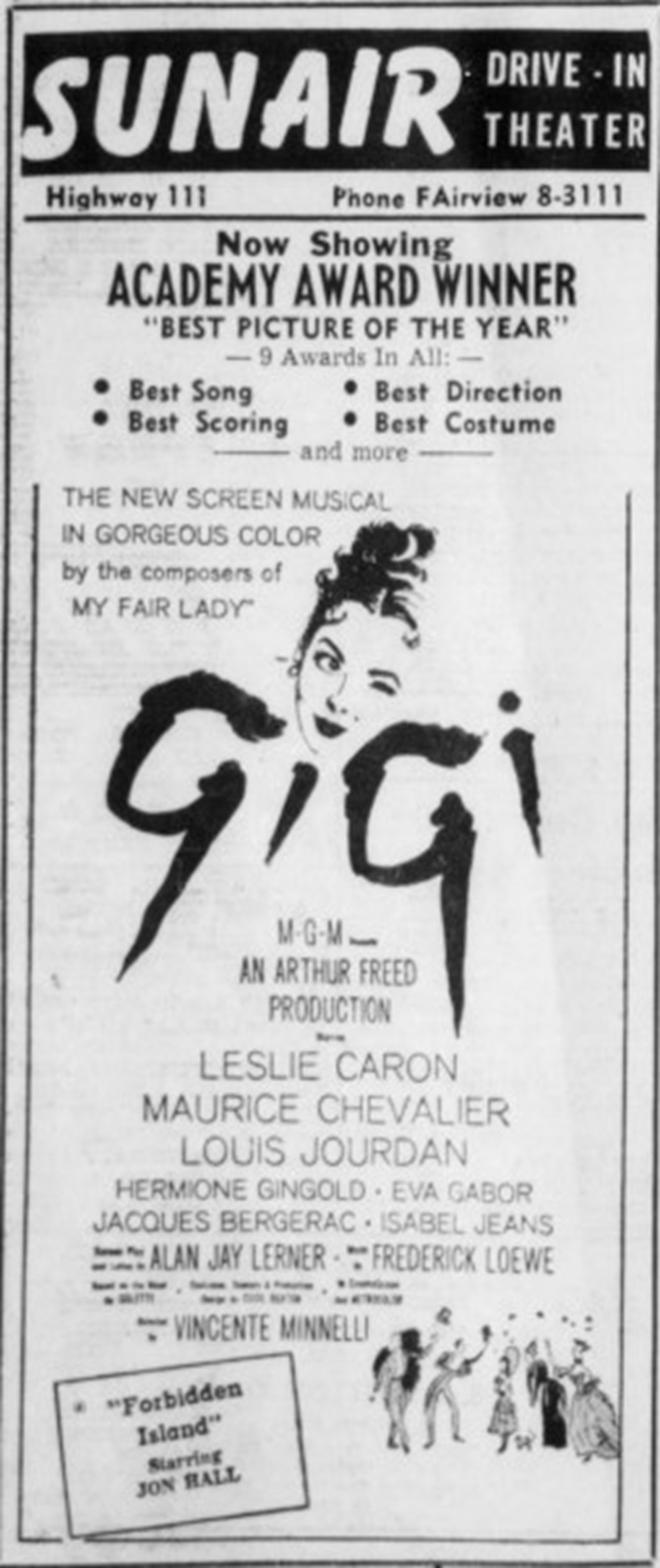
Drive-in advertisement from 1959

According to MGM records, the film earned $6.5 million in the US and Canada and $3.2 million elsewhere during its initial theatrical release, resulting in a profit of $1,983,000. It was Freed's last and largest grossing success.

In total, the film grossed $13,208,725 in its initial release and later 1966 re-release.

=== Critical reception ===
In the 1959 review for Sight & Sound, David Vaughan calls Gigi "an elegant film" with a "cultivated visual taste [which] is everywhere apparent". He summarizes that "while Gigi does not represent a revival of the MGM musical in its heyday, it is a welcome extension of latter-day musical style in its adult subject-matter and its avoidance of spectacle made vulgar by emphasis on size." He praises Minnelli's talent for "the delicious amorality of the anecdote, but also the honesty and irony of its telling [which] have become foreign to the American cinema." Vaughan points out "Chevalier's practiced but irresistible charm [as] one of the film's greatest assets" as well as "the brilliant high-comedy playing of Isabel Jeans, who as Aunt Alicia consummately portrays the distinction and beauty of a retired aristocrat of the demimonde."

Bosley Crowther of The New York Times called it "a musical film that bears such a basic resemblance to My Fair Lady that the authors may want to sue themselves". He added, "But don't think this point of resemblance is made in criticism of the film, for Gigi is a charming entertainment that can stand on its own two legs. It is not only a charming comprehension of the spicy confection of Colette, but it is also a lovely and lyrical enlargement upon that story's flavored mood and atmosphere ... Vincente Minnelli has marshaled a cast to give a set of performances that, for quality and harmony, are superb."

Abel Green of Variety called the film "100% escapist fare" and predicted it "is destined for a global box-office mop-up". He added, "Alan Jay Lerner's libretto is tailor-made for an inspired casting job for all principals, and Fritz Loewe's tunes (to Lerner's lyrics) already vie with and suggest their memorable My Fair Lady score... Miss Caron is completely captivating and convincing in the title role... Skillful casting, performance and presentation have endowed realism to the sum total... Director Minnelli's good taste in keeping it in bounds and the general sound judgment of all concerned...distinguishes this Arthur Freed independent production. The Metrocolor rates recognition for its soft pastels under Joseph Ruttenberg's lensing; the Beaton costumes, sets and general production design are vivid physical assets at first sight. The skillful integration of words-and-music with the plot motivation makes this Gigi a very fair lady indeed as a boxoffice entry."

Time Out New York said, "The dominating creative contribution comes from Minnelli and Cecil Beaton ... The combination of these two visual elitists is really too much—it's like a meal consisting of cheesecake, and one quickly longs for something solid and vulgar to weigh things down. No doubt inspired by the finicky, claustrophobic sets and bric-à-brac, the cast tries (with unfortunate success) to be more French than the French, especially Chevalier. The exception is Gingold, who inhabits, as always, a world of her own."

TV Guide rated the film 3½ out of five stars, calling it "Overbaked but enjoyable, and a banquet for the eyes, thanks to the visual wonder of the Minnelli-Beaton teaming... Caron...leads the cast in a contest to see who can be the most French. The winner is Chevalier, in a performance that makes one feel as if you're gagging on pastry... Perhaps if the sweetness of Gigi was contrasted with elements of honest vulgarity, the picture could balance itself out... Ten minutes into the movie, you've resolved the plot and are left to wallow in lovely frou-frou. [The film] makes wonderful use of the usual Parisian landmarks, and benefits from extraordinary period costumes and sets."

Some contemporary reviewers have criticized the film for its subject matter. In 2019, BuzzFeed News reporter Kate Aurthur ranked Gigi worst out of all Best Picture winners, calling it "the most creepy, pedophiliac movie to ever win Best Picture". Filmmaker magazine managing editor Vadim Rizov referred to the film as "incredibly sexist and kind of hateful".

On review aggregator Rotten Tomatoes, the film holds a score of 90% from 77 reviews, with an average rating of 7.6/10. The website's critics consensus reads, "It may not be one of Vincente Minnelli's best, but the charming and flawlessly acted Gigi still offers enough visual and musical treats to satisfy." On Metacritic, the film has a weighted average score of 82 out of 100 based on 13 critics, indicating "universal acclaim".

=== Accolades ===
With all 9 nominations, Gigi won a record-breaking nine Academy Awards (at the 1959 Oscars ceremony); however, this record only lasted for one year, as Ben-Hur broke this record the following year with 11 Oscars. In tribute to Gigi's domination of the Oscars, the MGM switchboard answered calls the following day with "M-Gigi-M". The success of Gigi also prompted the presentation of an Academy Honorary Award to Chevalier in 1959 "for his contributions to the world of entertainment for more than half a century."

Gigi, eventually along with 1987's The Last Emperor, held the record as the film(s) with the most Academy Award wins in every category in which it was nominated, until 2003's The Lord of the Rings: The Return of the King broke the record at the 2004 Oscars ceremony with 11 Oscar nominations and 11 Oscar wins.

Award	Category	Nominee(s)	Result	Ref.
Academy Awards	Best Motion Picture	Arthur Freed	Won	
Academy Awards	Best Director	Vincente Minnelli	Won	
Academy Awards	Best Screenplay – Based on Material from Another Medium	Alan Jay Lerner	Won	
Academy Awards	Best Art Direction	Art Direction: William A. Horning and E. Preston Ames; Set Decoration: Henry Grace and F. Keogh Gleason	Won	
Academy Awards	Best Cinematography – Color	Joseph Ruttenberg	Won	
Academy Awards	Best Costume Design	Cecil Beaton	Won	
Academy Awards	Best Film Editing	Adrienne Fazan	Won	
Academy Awards	Best Scoring of a Musical Picture	André Previn	Won	
Academy Awards	Best Song	"Gigi"; Music by Frederick Loewe; Lyrics by Alan Jay Lerner	Won	
British Academy Film Awards	Best Film from any Source		Nominated	
David di Donatello Awards	Best Foreign Language Film	Metro-Goldwyn-Mayer	Won	
Directors Guild of America Awards	Outstanding Directorial Achievement in Motion Pictures	Vincente Minnelli	Won	
Golden Globe Awards	Best Motion Picture – Musical		Won	
Golden Globe Awards	Best Actor in a Motion Picture – Musical or Comedy	Maurice Chevalier	Nominated	
Golden Globe Awards	Best Actor in a Motion Picture – Musical or Comedy	Louis Jourdan	Nominated	
Golden Globe Awards	Best Actress in a Motion Picture – Musical or Comedy	Leslie Caron	Nominated	
Golden Globe Awards	Best Supporting Actress – Motion Picture	Hermione Gingold	Won	
Golden Globe Awards	Best Director	Vincente Minnelli	Won	
Grammy Awards	Best Sound Track Album, Dramatic Picture Score or Original Cast	André Previn	Won	
Laurel Awards	Top Musical		Won	
Laurel Awards	Top Male Musical Performance	Maurice Chevalier	Nominated	
Laurel Awards	Top Male Musical Performance	Louis Jourdan	Nominated	
Laurel Awards	Top Female Musical Performance	Leslie Caron	Won	
Laurel Awards	Top Female Musical Performance	Hermione Gingold	Nominated	
Laurel Awards	Top Cinematography – Color	Joseph Ruttenberg	Nominated	
Laurel Awards	Best Song	"Gigi"; Music by Frederick Loewe; Lyrics by Alan Jay Lerner	Nominated	
National Board of Review Awards	Top Ten Films		10th Place	
National Film Preservation Board	National Film Registry		Inducted	
Photoplay Awards	Gold Medal		Won	
Writers Guild of America Awards	Best Written Musical	Alan Jay Lerner	Won	

==== American Film Institute ====
- AFI's 100 Years...100 Passions -#35
- AFI's 100 Years...100 Songs
  - Thank Heaven for Little Girls -#56

== Popular culture ==
- Jazz trumpeter, bandleader, and arranger Shorty Rogers released an album of Lerner and Loewe's music, Gigi in Jazz, in 1958.
- The soundtrack album cover appears on the cover for Pink Floyd's Ummagumma (1969) album, designed by Storm Thorgerson. For the US/Canada and Australian releases the cover was airbrushed out because of fears of copyright infringement. The artwork was restored in the later CD releases in all territories.
- Edith Bouvier Beale (best known as "Little Edie") mentioned several times in the Maysles brothers 1975 documentary Grey Gardens that Gigi was "absolutely marvelous".
- In the book series, The Mother Daughter Book Club by Heather Vogel Frederick, the character Gigi gets her nickname from her love of the musical.

== See also ==
- List of American films of 1958
