= Candoli =

Candoli is a surname. Notable people with the surname include:

- Conte Candoli (1927–2001), American jazz trumpeter, brother of Pete
- Pete Candoli (1923–2008), American jazz trumpeter
