= Don Sleet =

- Born: Donald Clayborn Sleet; November 27, 1938; Fort Wayne, Indiana, United States
- Died: December 31, 1986 (aged 48) Hollywood, California, United States
- Genres: Jazz, hard bop
- Occupations: Musician, bandleader
- Instrument: Trumpet
- Years active: c. 1954–1964
- Labels: Pacific Jazz, Riverside

Donald Clayborn Sleet (November 27, 1938 – December 31, 1986) was an American jazz trumpeter. He was a member of Howard Rumsey's Lighthouse All-Stars and Lenny McBrowne and the Four Souls. Widely considered a gifted musician, compared to the likes of Art Farmer and Kenny Dorham, Sleet had a short career as a result of his drug abuse, recording only one album as a leader.

== Life and career ==
=== Early years ===
Sleet was born in Fort Wayne, Indiana, on November 27, 1938. His father was a music teacher at school from whom he began to take lessons at age nine. His family moved to San Diego, California, when he was ten years old. There he took piano lessons for four years before taking up the trumpet. Buddy Childers was his mentor for a year in Hollywood, before studying with Daniel Lewis in San Diego, where he was part of the San Diego State College Jazz Band. In addition, he studied with Shorty Rogers in Los Angeles, where he became a member of Terry Gibbs's big band. He also studied classical music, playing for the San Diego Symphony for three years.

Sleet fronted a small jazz combo in the mid-1950s, winning the Easter Week Jazz Festival at the Lighthouse Café in Hermosa Beach in 1956 and 1957. In 1959, he joined Lenny McBrowne and the Four Souls, with whom he recorded an album in early 1960. In the summer of 1960 he became a member of Howard Rumsey's Lighthouse All-Stars. In October 1960, Sleet went to New York with The Four Souls to record their second and final album, Eastern Lights, supervised by Ornette Coleman.

=== All Members ===
Sleet's only session as a leader took place on March 16, 1961. Recorded in New York under the supervision of Orrin Keepnews, All Members also featured the musicians Jimmy Heath (tenor saxophone), Wynton Kelly (piano), Ron Carter (double bass) and Jimmy Cobb (drums). The album was released by the Jazzland label (a subsidiary of Riverside) and was described as "outstanding" by Down Beat. AllMusic's Alex Henderson described the album as a "fine hard bop date" where Sleet "shows himself to be a captivating soloist". The album was reissued in 2001 as part of Fantasy Records' Original Jazz Classics series.

=== Later years and death ===
After the release of his album, Sleet began to abuse recreational drugs, which forced him to quit playing. In the summer of 1964, Sleet played in Shelly Manne's My Fair Lady with the Un-original Cast, his last session. He would subsequently join the Synanon drug rehabilitation program, but for the rest of his career he would only sporadically play gigs. He died on December 31, 1986, at his home in Hollywood due to a lymphoma that he had been battling for three years.

== Style ==
An "expressive, swinging player", Sleet was influenced by Chet Baker, Miles Davis and Kenny Dorham amongst others. He has also been compared to Art Farmer due to his "smooth tone".

== Family ==
Sleet got married in the 1970s but never had children. His younger brother David was a professional drummer in the 1960s and a member of the National Association of Rudimental Drummers.

== Discography ==
=== As leader ===
- 1961: All Members (Jazzland)

=== As sideman ===
With Lenny McBrowne and the Four Souls

- Lenny McBrowne and the 4 Souls (Pacific Jazz, 1960)
- Eastern Lights (Riverside, 1960)

With Shelly Manne

- My Fair Lady with the Un-original Cast (Capitol, 1964)
