= Way Up There =

Studio album by Shorty Rogers and His Giants
- Released: 1957
- Recorded: March 3, October 26, and December 6, 9 & 16, 1955; Los Angeles, CA
- Genre: Jazz
- Label: Atlantic; LP 1270
- Producer: Nesuhi Ertegun

Shorty Rogers chronology
Martians Come Back! (1955)	Way Up There (1957)	Wherever the Five Winds Blow (1957)

Way Up There is an album by American jazz trumpeter, composer and arranger Shorty Rogers, released on the Atlantic label in 1957.

== Reception ==
Professional ratings
Review scores
Source	Rating
Allmusic	4/5 stars

Jim Todd on Allmusic calls the album "a good overview of Rogers' work in the company of a who's who of West Coast jazz, playing arrangements for trumpet section and rhythm, quintet, and brass and winds with rhythm."

== Track listing ==
All compositions by Shorty Rogers except where noted.

1. "Blues Way Up There" - 5:21
2. "Moten Swing" (Benny Moten, Buster Moten) - 5:59
3. "Blues Way Down There" - 4:15
4. "Solarization" - 4:26
5. "Pixieland" - 4:26
6. "Wail of Two Cities" - 5:46
7. "Baklava Bridge" - 5:27
8. "March of the Martians" - 4:33
- Recorded in Los Angeles, CA on March 3 (track 4), October 26 (track 8), December 6 (track 5), December 9 (tracks 6 & 7) and December 16 (tracks 1–3), 1955

== Personnel ==
- Shorty Rogers - trumpet, flugelhorn
- Conte Candoli, Pete Candoli, Harry Edison, Don Fagerquist - trumpet (track 5)
- Bob Enevoldsen - valve trombone (tracks 6 & 7)
- John Graas - French horn (tracks 6 & 7)
- Paul Sarmento - tuba (tracks 6 & 7)
- Jimmy Giuffre - clarinet (tracks 4 & 8)
- Bud Shank - alto saxophone (tracks 1–3, 6 & 7)
- Barney Kessel - guitar (tracks 1–3)
- Pete Jolly (tracks 1–4), Lou Levy (tracks 5–8) - piano
- Curtis Counce (track 4), Ralph Peña (tracks 5–8), Leroy Vinnegar (tracks 1–3) - bass
- Shelly Manne - drums
