= Feelin' Kinda Blues =

Studio album by Gerald Wilson Orchestra
- Released: 1965
- Recorded: November 30 and December 2, 1965; United Recorders, Los Angeles, CA
- Genre: Jazz
- Label: Pacific Jazz; PJ 10099
- Producer: Richard Bock

Gerald Wilson chronology
On Stage (1965)	Feelin' Kinda Blues (1965)	The Golden Sword (1966)

Feelin' Kinda Blues is an album by the Gerald Wilson Orchestra recorded in 1965 and released on the Pacific Jazz label.

== Reception ==
Professional ratings
Review scores
Source	Rating
Down Beat (Original Lp release)	4/5 stars
AllMusic	4/5 stars

AllMusic rated the album with 4 stars; in his review, Scott Yanow said: "Surprisingly Wilson did not contribute any of the ten songs but his arrangements make all of the pieces sound fresh and swinging".

== Track listing ==
1. "When I'm Feeling Kinda Blue" (Gerald Wilson) - 3:40
2. "Freddie Freeloader" (Miles Davis) - 4:12
3. "Do Anything You Wanna" (Harold Betters, Carl Ramsey) - 2:21
4. "Yesterday" (John Lennon, Paul McCartney) - 2:22
5. "Watermelon Man" (Herbie Hancock) - 4:33
6. "Yeh Yeh" (Rodgers Grant, Pat Patrick, Jon Hendricks) - 2:35
7. "One On the House" (Harry James, Ernie Wilkins) - 4:36
8. "I Got You (I Feel Good)" (James Brown) - 2:46
9. "I Concentrate on You" (Cole Porter) - 4:58
10. "Well Son Shuffle" (Mike Barone) - 2:53
- Recorded at United Recorders in Los Angeles, CA on November 30, 1965 (tracks 4, 8 & 9) and December 2, 1965 (tracks 1–3 & 5–7)

== Personnel ==
- Gerald Wilson - arranger, conductor
- Bobby Bryant, Jules Chaikin, Freddie Hill, Nat Meeks, Melvin Moore, Al Porcino - trumpet
- Bob Edmondson, John Ewing, Lester Robertson - trombone
- Fred Murell - bass trombone
- Curtis Amy - soprano saxophone
- Anthony Ortega - alto saxophone, flute, piccolo
- Teddy Edwards, Harold Land - tenor saxophone
- Jack Nimitz - baritone saxophone
- Phil Moore III - piano
- Don Randi - organ
- Dennis Budimir - guitar
- Buddy Woodson - bass
- Victor Feldman - vibraphone
- Mel Lee - drums
- Modesto Duran, Bones Howe, Adolfo Valdes - percussion
