= Ollie Mitchell =

Musical artist (1927–2013)

- Birth name: Oliver Edward Mitchell
- Born: April 8, 1927 Los Angeles, California, U.S.
- Died: May 11, 2013 (aged 86) Puako, Hawaii, U.S.
- Genres: Big band
- Occupation(s): Musician, bandleader
- Instrument: Trumpet
- Years active: 1944–2013

Oliver Edward Mitchell (April 8, 1927 – May 11, 2013) was an American musician and bandleader. He was the son of Harold Mitchell, lead trumpeter for MGM Studios, who taught Ollie to play the trumpet.

== Career ==
Mitchell would go on to play in big bands for Harry James, Buddy Rich and Pérez Prado, among others, as well as the NBC Symphony Orchestra. In the 1960s, Mitchell joined The Wrecking Crew, a group of studio and session musicians who played anonymously on many records for popular singers of the time, as well as television theme songs, film scores, and advertising jingles. Mitchell was also an original member of Herb Alpert's Tijuana Brass. He would go on to have his own bands—Ollie Mitchell's Sunday Band, and the Olliephonic Horns.

== Personal life ==
In 1995, Mitchell and his wife Nancy moved from Los Angeles to Puako, Hawaii, where he founded the Horns. In 2010, Mitchell published his memoir, Lost, But Making Good Time: A View from the Back Row of the Band. According to his wife, he stopped playing the trumpet toward the end of his life, due to macular degeneration and hand problems from an automobile accident. Mitchell also suffered from cancer and died on May 11, 2013. He was survived by his wife and four children.

== Discography ==
With Chet Baker

- Blood, Chet and Tears (Verve, 1970)

With Harry James

- The New James (Capitol Records – ST 1037, 1958)
- Harry's Choice (Capitol Records – ST 1093, 1958)

With Stan Kenton

- Stan Kenton Conducts the Los Angeles Neophonic Orchestra (Capitol, 1965)
- Hair (Capitol, 1969)

With Irene Kral

- Wonderful Life (Mainstream, 1965)

With Shorty Rogers

- Chances Are It Swings (RCA Victor, 1958)
- The Wizard of Oz and Other Harold Arlen Songs (RCA Victor, 1959)
- Shorty Rogers Meets Tarzan (MGM, 1960)
- An Invisible Orchard (RCA Victor, 1961 [1997])
- Bossa Nova (Reprise, 1962)
- Jazz Waltz (Reprise, 1962)

With Pete Rugolo

- Rugolo Plays Kenton (EmArcy, 1958)
- The Music from Richard Diamond (EmArcy, 1959)
- Behind Brigitte Bardot (Warner Bros., 1960)
- The Original Music of Thriller (Time, 1961)
- Ten Trumpets and 2 Guitars (Mercury, 1961)

With Steely Dan

- Pretzel Logic (ABC Records, 1974)

With Dan Terry

- The Complete Vita Recordings of Dan Terry (Vita Records, 1952)

With Gerald Wilson

- California Soul (Pacific Jazz, 1968)

== Bibliography ==
- Mitchell, Ollie (2010). Lost, But Making Good Time: A View from the Back Row of the Band. CreateSpace Independent Publishing Platform. ISBN 978-1453773413.

== See also ==
- List of trumpeters
