= Martians Come Back! =

Studio album by Shorty Rogers and His Giants
- Released: August 1956
- Recorded: October 26, November 3 and December 6, 9 & 16, 1955; Los Angeles, CA
- Genre: Jazz
- Length: 46:07
- Label: Atlantic; LP 1232
- Producer: Nesuhi Ertegun

Shorty Rogers chronology
| Martians Stay Home (1955) | Martians Come Back! (1956) | Way Up There (1956) |

Martians Come Back! is an album by American jazz trumpeter, composer and arranger Shorty Rogers, released on the Atlantic label in August 1956.

== Reception ==
Professional ratings
Review scores
| Source | Rating |
|---|---|
| Allmusic | 4/5 stars |

Jim Todd, writing for Allmusic, described the album as "a good overview of Rogers' work in the company of a who's who of West Coast jazz, playing arrangements for trumpet section and rhythm, quintet, and brass and winds with rhythm."

== Track listing ==
All compositions by Shorty Rogers except where noted.

1. "Martians Come Back" - 6:13
2. "Astral Alley" - 4:35
3. "Lotus Bud" - 4:56
4. "Dickie's Dream" (Count Basie, Lester Young) - 5:33
5. "Papouche" - 4:16
6. "Serenade in Sweets" - 6:35
7. "Planetarium" - 3:37
8. "Chant of the Cosmos" - 6:15
- Recorded in Los Angeles, CA on October 26 (tracks 1 & 7), November 3 (tracks 3 & 5), December 6 (tracks 2 & 6), December 9 (track 8) and December 16 (track 4), 1955

== Personnel ==
- Shorty Rogers - trumpet, flugelhorn
- Conte Candoli, Pete Candoli, Harry Edison, Don Fagerquist - trumpet (tracks 2 & 6)
- Bob Enevoldsen - valve trombone (track 8)
- John Graas - French horn (track 8)
- Paul Sarmento - tuba (track 8)
- Jimmy Giuffre - clarinet (tracks 1, 3, 5, 7 & 8)
- Bud Shank - alto saxophone (tracks 4 & 8)
- Barney Kessel - guitar (track 4)
- Pete Jolly (track 4), Lou Levy (tracks 1–3 & 5–8) - piano
- Ralph Peña (tracks 1–3 & 5–8), Leroy Vinnegar (track 4) - bass
- Shelly Manne - drums
