= Peter Gunn (disambiguation) =

Peter Gunn is an American TV series.

Peter Gunn may also refer to:

- Peter Gunn (actor) (born 1963), English actor
- Peter Gunn (politician) (1864–1927), politician from Alberta, Canada
- "Peter Gunn" (song), the theme music composed by Henry Mancini for the television show of the same name
- Peter Gunn (film), a 1989 television film by Blake Edwards
- Peter Gunn (album), a 1959 album by Ted Nash
