= Al Porcino =

American musician (1923–2013)

Al Porcino (May 14, 1925 – December 31, 2013) was an American lead trumpeter.

He was born in New York, United States. Porcino began playing professionally in 1943, and played in many of the big bands of the 1940s and 1950s, including those of Georgie Auld, Louis Prima, Jerry Wald, Tommy Dorsey, Gene Krupa, and Chubby Jackson. He played with Woody Herman in 1946, 1949–1950, 1954, and 1972. He also did two stints with Stan Kenton, in 1947–48 and 1954–55. In the 1950s, he played with Pete Rugolo, Count Basie, Elliot Lawrence, and Charlie Barnet.

In 1957, he moved to Los Angeles, where he worked as a studio musician. While there he played in the Terry Gibbs Dream band from 1959 to 1962. In the 1960s, he often played in orchestras backing vocalists, and also played with Buddy Rich in 1968, Thad Jones and Mel Lewis in 1969–70. In the 1970s, he formed his own big band, who recorded behind Mel Torme, in addition to their own work.

In the 1970s, Porcino moved to Germany, leading big bands there for two decades. His ensemble played on one of Al Cohn's final recordings in 1987.

He died after suffering a fall in Munich on December 31, 2013.

== Discography ==
With Mose Allison

- Your Mind Is on Vacation (Atlantic, 1976)

With Louis Bellson

- Big Band Jazz from the Summit (Roulette, 1962)

With Benny Carter

- Aspects (United Artists, 1959)

With Gil Fuller

- Night Flight (Pacific Jazz, 1965)

With Dizzy Gillespie

- One Night in Washington (Elektra/Musician, 1955 [1983])
- The New Continent (Limelight, 1962)

With Stan Kenton

- Stan Kenton's Milestones (Capitol, 1943–47 [1950])
- Stan Kenton Classics (Capitol, 1944–47 [1952])
- Encores (Capitol, 1947)
- A Presentation of Progressive Jazz (Capitol, 1947)
- Popular Favorites by Stan Kenton (Capitol, 1953)
- The Kenton Era (Capitol, 1940–54, [1955])
- Contemporary Concepts (Capitol, 1955)
- Two Much! (Capitol, 1960) with Ann Richards

With Junior Mance

- Get Ready, Set, Jump!!! (Capitol, 1964)
- Straight Ahead! (Capitol, 1964)

With Johnny Mandel

- I Want to Live (United Artists, 1958)

With Shelly Manne

- My Fair Lady with the Un-original Cast (Capitol, 1964)
- Manne–That's Gershwin! (Capitol, 1965)

With Mark Murphy

- Playing the Field (Capitol, 1960)

With Charlie Parker

- Big Band (Clef, 1954)

With Buddy Rich

- Mercy, Mercy (Pacific Jazz, 1968)

with Shorty Rogers

- Shorty Rogers Plays Richard Rodgers (RCA Victor, 1957)
- Portrait of Shorty (RCA Victor, 1957)
- Afro-Cuban Influence (RCA Victor, 1958)
- Chances Are It Swings (RCA Victor, 1958)
- The Wizard of Oz and Other Harold Arlen Songs (RCA Victor, 1959)
- Shorty Rogers Meets Tarzan (MGM, 1960)
- An Invisible Orchard (RCA Victor, 1961 [1997])
- Jazz Waltz (Reprise, 1962)

With Pete Rugolo

- Rugolo Plays Kenton (EmArcy, 1958)

With Lalo Schifrin

- Jazz Suite on the Mass Texts (RCA Victor, 1965) with Paul Horn
- The Cincinnati Kid (soundtrack) (MGM, 1965)
- Music from Mission: Impossible (Dot, 1967)

With Mel Tormé

- Mel Tormé live at the Maisonette (Atlantic, 1975)

With Gerald Wilson

- You Better Believe It! (Pacific Jazz, 1961)
- Moment of Truth (Pacific Jazz, 1962)
- Portraits (Pacific Jazz, 1964)
- On Stage (Pacific Jazz, 1965)
- Feelin' Kinda Blues (Pacific Jazz, 1965)
- The Golden Sword (Pacific Jazz, 1966)
- Live and Swinging (Pacific Jazz, 1967)
