= Tarzan, the Ape Man (1959 film) =

1959 film by Joseph M. Newman

- Theatrical poster
- Directed by: Joseph M. Newman
- Screenplay by: Robert Hill
- Based on: Tarzan of the Apes; 1912 magazine by Edgar Rice Burroughs
- Produced by: Al Zimbalist
- Starring: Denny Miller; Cesare Danova; Joanna Barnes; Robert Douglas
- Narrated by: Robert Douglas
- Cinematography: Paul C. Vogel
- Edited by: Gene Ruggiero
- Music by: Shorty Rogers
- Color process: Technicolor
- Distributed by: Metro-Goldwyn-Mayer
- Release date: October 1959
- Running time: 82 minutes
- Country: United States
- Language: English
- Budget: $689,000
- Box office: $1,710,000

Tarzan, the Ape Man is a 1959 American action adventure film released by Metro-Goldwyn-Mayer starring Denny Miller as Tarzan, Joanna Barnes as Jane, Cesare Danova, and Robert Douglas. The film is loosely based on Edgar Rice Burroughs' novel Tarzan of the Apes, and is a remake of the classic 1932 film of the same name. The film was directed by Joseph M. Newman, and the score was composed by jazz musician Shorty Rogers. MGM would release another remake of the film in 1981.

MGM reused a fair amount of footage from their 1932 version rather than reshooting, including scenes of Tarzan swinging on vines and the elephants' destruction of a pygmy village. A scene of Tarzan fighting a crocodile was reused from Tarzan and His Mate, the sequel to the 1932 film. Other footage was reused from King Solomon's Mines. Tarzan's distinctive call was also taken from the original version. The "African" elephants in some scenes are clearly Indian ones with some sort of canvas "ears" added, and with the characteristic double humps on the forehead all too obvious.

The "jungle" vegetation, from three different continents, an extremely phoney looking rubber mask used for close ups of a roaring leopard and the clumsy back-projection in the "underwater" scenes make it a treat for lovers of the ludicrous.

== Plot ==
The plot of the film reprises that of the 1932 version, with James Parker (Robert Douglas), Harry Holt (Cesare Danova) and Parker's daughter Jane (Joanna Barnes) on an expedition in Africa in which they encounter Tarzan (Denny Miller), a wild man raised by apes. Various adventures ensue.

== Cast ==
- Denny Miller as Tarzan
- Cesare Danova as Harry Holt
- Joanna Barnes as Jane Parker
- Robert Douglas as Colonel James Parker
- Thomas Yangha as Riano (uncredited)

== Production ==
The film was made at the same time as another Tarzan film, Tarzan's Greatest Adventure produced by Sy Weintraub. MGM had kept the remake rights to the 1932 Tarzan the Ape Man, enabling them to make this film. The rights to the bulk of the Tarzan stories were owned by Weintraub.

== Box office ==
According to MGM records the film earned $660,000 in the US and Canada and $1,050,000 elsewhere resulting in a profit of $92,000.

== Musical score and soundtrack ==
Shorty Rogers Meets Tarzan

Soundtrack album by Shorty Rogers
- Released: 1960
- Recorded: November 1959; Hollywood, California
- Genre: Film score
- Label: MGM Records
- Producer: Jesse Kaye

Shorty Rogers chronology
The Wizard of Oz and Other Harold Arlen Songs (1959)	Shorty Rogers Meets Tarzan (1960)	The Swingin' Nutcracker (1960)

The film score was composed, arranged and conducted by Shorty Rogers and the soundtrack album was released on the MGM label in 1960 as Shorty Rogers Meets Tarzan.

=== Reception ===
Professional ratings
Review scores
Source	Rating
AllMusic	4/5 stars

The AllMusic review by Scott Yanow says "Although there are many short solos, the emphasis is on the dense and frequently exciting ensembles. The music, which is heard here in full-length form (unlike in the movie, where it is often buried behind the action), sounds quite self-sufficient apart from the action".

=== Track listing ===
All compositions by Shorty Rogers

1. "The Elephant Walk" – 3:25
2. "Les Barbaros" – 1:40
3. "Paradise Found" – 3:05
4. "Trapped" – 1:55
5. "Los Primitivos" – 2:14
6. "Oomgawa" – 3:15
7. "Tarzanic Suite" – 17:34

=== Personnel ===
- Shorty Rogers – flugelhorn, arranger, conductor
- Buddy Childers, Don Fagerquist, Ollie Mitchell, Al Porcino – trumpet
- Harry Betts, Frank Rosolino – trombone
- Bob Enevoldsen – valve trombone
- Marshall Cram – bass trombone
- Bud Shank – flute, alto saxophone
- Bill Perkins – flute, tenor saxophone
- Bob Cooper – oboe, tenor saxophone
- Bill Holman – tenor saxophone
- Bill Hood – tenor saxophone, baritone saxophone
- Chuck Gentry – baritone saxophone
- Pete Jolly – piano
- Buddy Clark, Joe Mondragon – bass
- Frank Capp – drums
- Frank Guerrero – timbales
- Modesto Durán, Rafael Rosario – congas
- Chacho González – bongos
