= The Golden Sword (album) =

Studio album by Gerald Wilson Orchestra
- Released: 1966
- Recorded: June 21, July 8 and August 19, 1966; TTG Sound Studios, Hollywood, CA
- Genre: Jazz
- Label: Pacific Jazz; PJ 10111
- Producer: Albert Marx and Richard Bock

Gerald Wilson chronology
Feelin' Kinda Blues (1965)	The Golden Sword (1966)	Live and Swinging (1967)

The Golden Sword (subtitled Torero Impressions in Jazz) is an album by the Gerald Wilson Orchestra recorded in 1966 and released on the Pacific Jazz label.

== Music ==
The ten tracks "pay tribute to aspects of Mexico". "Carlos" is a tribute to bullfighter Carlos Arruza.

== Release and reception ==
Professional ratings
Review scores
Source	Rating
AllMusic	4.5/5 stars

The Golden Sword was released by Pacific Jazz Records. AllMusic rated the album with 4½ stars; in his review, Scott Yanow called it "One of Gerald Wilson's most memorable albums". An All About Jazz reviewer described it as "one of the best Wilson albums of the entire Pacific Jazz lot".

== Track listing ==
All compositions by Gerald Wilson except as indicated

1. "The Golden Sword" - 3:11
2. "Man of La Mancha" (Joe Darion, Mitch Leigh) - 2:16
3. "The Breeze and I" (Ernesto Lecuona) - 5:23
4. "Carlos" - 5:23
5. "Chanson du Feu Follet (Song of Mad Fire)" (Manuel de Falla) - 4:07
6. "Mi Corazon (My Heart)" - 2:58
7. "Blues Latinese" - 5:35
8. "The Feather (From "Teatihuacan Suite")" - 4:15
9. "La Mentira (The Lie)" (Álvaro Carrillo) - 2:05
10. "The Serpent (From "Teatihuacan Suite")" - 4:05
- Recorded at TTG Sound Studios in Hollywood, CA on June 21, 1966 (tracks 4, 8 & 10) July 8, 1966 (tracks 1, 5 & 7) and August 19, 1966 (tracks 2, 3, 6, 8 & 9).

== Personnel ==
- Gerald Wilson - arranger, conductor, maracas
- Conte Candoli (tracks 3, 6, 8 & 9), Jules Chaikin, Freddie Hill, Nat Meeks (tracks 1, 5 & 7), Mel Moore, Jimmy Owens (tracks 4, 8 & 10), Al Porcino - trumpet
- Mike Barone, John Ewing, Lester Robertson - trombone
- Ernie Tack - bass trombone
- William Green - flute, piccolo
- Jimmy Woods - soprano saxophone, alto saxophone (tracks 1, 4, 5, 7, 8 & 10)
- Anthony Ortega - alto saxophone, flute
- Teddy Edwards, Harold Land - tenor saxophone
- Jack Nimitz - baritone saxophone
- Roy Ayers (tracks 1, 4, 5, 7, 8 & 10), Victor Feldman (tracks 2, 3, 6, 8 & 9) - vibraphone
- Jack Wilson - piano
- Laurindo Almeida - guitar (tracks 2, 3, 6, 8 & 9)
- Buddy Woodson - double bass
- Mel Lee - drums
- Max Garduno congas
