= Gospel Mission =

Album by Shorty Rogers

Studio album by Shorty Rogers
- Released: 1963
- Recorded: June 23, 1963; Los Angeles, CA
- Genre: Jazz
- Length: 39:53
- Label: Capitol; T/ST 1960
- Producer: Nick Venet

Shorty Rogers chronology
Mavis Meets Shorty (1963)	Gospel Mission (1963)	Re-Entry (1983)

Gospel Mission is an album by American jazz trumpeter, composer and arranger Shorty Rogers, issued by Capitol Records in 1963. It would be the last album released under Roger's leadership for two decades when he focussed on arrangements for film and TV.

== Reception ==
Professional ratings
Review scores
Source	Rating
Allmusic	3/5 stars

Allmusic awarded the album 3 stars.

== Track listing ==
All compositions by Shorty Rogers.

1. "Gospel Mission"
2. "Gonna Shout - All The Way to Heaven"
3. "Wake Up and Shout"
4. "Sit Down Shorty"
5. "Freedom's Coming"
6. "Swinging Gold Chariots"
7. "Preacherman Gonna Stop By Here"
8. "Great Days Ahead"
9. "Climbing to Heaven"
10. "Joshua's Saxes"
11. "We´re On Our Way Shout"
12. "Talk About Rain"

== Personnel ==
- Shorty Rogers - flugelhorn, arranger, conductor
- Unidentified orchestra featuring:
  - Plas Johnson - tenor saxophone
