= Modern Sounds =

Studio album by Shorty Rogers
- Released: 1952
- Recorded: October 8, 1951; Los Angeles, CA
- Genre: Jazz
- Label: Capitol
- Producer: Gene Norman

Shorty Rogers chronology
Modern Sounds (1952)	Popo (1952)

12 Inch LP Reissue Cover

Modern Sounds is the debut album by trumpeter and bandleader Shorty Rogers, featuring performances recorded in late 1951 and originally released in 1952 as a 10-inch LP on the Capitol label. The tracks were also released in 1956 on a 12-inch LP split album under the same title with additional recordings by Gerry Mulligan.

== Reception ==
Professional ratings
Review scores
Source	Rating
AllMusic	4/5 stars

The AllMusic review by Stephen Cook observed: "Rogers' outfit includes then future West Coast stars like alto saxophonist Art Pepper, tenor saxophonist Jimmy Giuffre, pianist Hampton Hawes, and drummer Shelley Manne, among others. Each soloist gets plenty of room to stretch out on a set including four Rogers originals".

== Track listing ==
All compositions by Shorty Rogers except where noted.

1. "Popo" - 2:59
2. "Over the Rainbow" (Harold Arlen, Yip Harburg) - 2:59
3. "Four Mothers" (Jimmy Giuffre) - 2:46
4. "Didi" - 2:24
5. "Sam and the Lady" - 3:05
6. "Apropos" - 2:36

== Personnel ==
- Shorty Rogers - trumpet, arranger
- John Graas - French horn
- Gene Englund - tuba
- Art Pepper - alto saxophone
- Jimmy Giuffre - tenor saxophone, arranger
- Hampton Hawes - piano
- Don Bagley - bass
- Shelly Manne - drums
