= Pete Candoli =

American jazz trumpeter (1923–2008)

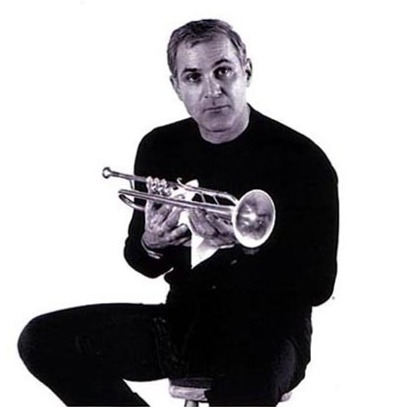
- Candoli in the 1950s

Background information
- Born: Walter Joseph Candoli; June 28, 1923; Mishawaka, Indiana, U.S.
- Died: January 11, 2008 (aged 84) Studio City, California, U.S.
- Genres: Jazz
- Occupation: Musician
- Instrument: Trumpet
- Years active: 1936–2008
- Labels: Kapp, Decca
- Formerly of: Conte Candoli
- Spouse(s): Edie Adams; Betty Hutton

Walter Joseph "Pete" Candoli (June 28, 1923 – January 11, 2008) was an American jazz trumpeter. He played with the big bands of Woody Herman and Stan Kenton and worked in the studios of the recording and television industries.

== Career ==
A native of Mishawaka, Indiana, Candoli was the older brother of Conte Candoli.

During the 1940s he performed with a number of big bands, including those led by Sonny Dunham, Will Bradley, Ray McKinley, Tommy Dorsey, Teddy Powell, Woody Herman, Boyd Raeburn, Tex Beneke, and Jerry Gray. Known for his ability to play in the upper register of the trumpet, he was nicknamed "Superman". While performing with Woody Herman's First Herd, he occasionally wore a Superman costume during solos. In the 1950s he joined the bands of Stan Kenton and Les Brown and later moved to Los Angeles, where he worked extensively as a studio musician. His studio work included contributions to film and television soundtracks such as Bell, Book and Candle, The Man with the Golden Arm, and Peter Gunn. He also made occasional on-screen appearances in television series and films during this period.

Candoli frequently collaborated with his brother Conte Candoli; the two led a joint band in the late 1950s and early 1960s, and reunited for performances intermittently from the 1970s to the 1990s. In the early 1970s he also performed in nightclubs with his second wife, singer Edie Adams. Health issues temporarily interrupted his career in the late 1970s, but he later returned to performing at festivals and appeared with Lionel Hampton. He also rejoined the Woody Herman orchestra for its anniversary concerts.

Candoli was featured as a performer on the soundtrack of the animated series The Ant and the Aardvark, which incorporated jazz elements.

Candoli died on January 11, 2008, at the age of 84, from complications of prostate cancer.

== Awards and honors ==
- International Jazz Hall of Fame, 1997
- Big Band Hall of Fame, 2003
- Look magazine named him one of the seven all-time outstanding jazz trumpet players.

== Discography ==
=== As leader ===
- For Peter's Sake (Kapp, 1960)
- Blues, When Your Lover Has Gone (Somerset/Stereo-Fidelity, 1961)
- Moscow Mule and Many More Kicks (Decca, 1966)
- From the Top (Dobre, 1978)
- Live at the Royal Palms Inn Vol. 9 with Bill Perkins, Carl Fontana (Woofy, 1994)

With Conte Candoli

- The Brothers Candoli (Dot, 1957)
- Bell, Book, and Candoli (Dot, 1959)
- 2 for the Money (Mercury, 1959)
- There Is Nothing Like a Dame (Warner Bros., 1962)
- Candoli Brothers (Dobre, 1978)
- Two Brothers (Hindsight 1999)

=== As sideman ===
With Glen Gray

- Sounds of the Great Bands! (Capitol 1958)
- Sounds of the Great Bands Volume 2 (Capitol, 1959)
- Solo Spotlight (Capitol, 1960)
- Please Mr. Gray (Capitol, 1961)
- Themes of the Great Bands (Capitol, 1963)

With Woody Herman

- Woody Herman and the Herd at Carnegie Hall (Lion, 1958)
- The Thundering Herds (Columbia, 1961)
- The First Herd at Carnegie Hall (VSP, 1966)
- Live at Carnegie Hall (VSP, 1966)
- The Turning Point 1943–1944 (Coral, 1969)

With Stan Kenton

- Popular Favorites by Stan Kenton (Capitol, 1953)
- This Modern World (Capitol, 1953)
- Kenton in Hi-Fi (Capitol, 1956)
- By Request (Creative World, 1971)
- By Request Volume II (Creative World, 1972)

With Peggy Lee

- Black Coffee (Decca, 1956)
- Things Are Swingin' (Capitol, 1958)
- Blues Cross Country (Capitol, 1962)

With Henry Mancini

- The Music from Peter Gunn (RCA, 1959)
- More Music from Peter Gunn (RCA Victor, 1959)
- The Blues and the Beat (RCA Victor, 1960)
- Combo! (RCA Victor, 1961)
- Uniquely Mancini (RCA Victor, 1963)
- The Concert Sound of Henry Mancini (RCA Victor, 1964)
- Henry Mancini's Golden Album (RCA Victor, 1966)
- Gunn...Number One!: Music from the Film Score (RCA Victor, 1967)
- Mancini '67 (RCA Victor, 1967)
- Mancini Concert (RCA Victor, 1971)

With Skip Martin

- The Music from Mickey Spillane's Mike Hammer (RCA Victor, 1959)
- 8 Brass, 5 Sax, 4 Rhythm (MGM, 1959)
- Scheherajazz (Somerset, 1959)
- Swingin' with Prince Igor (Sonic Workshop, 1960)
- Songs and Sounds from the Era of the Untouchables (Somerset, 1960)
- Perspectives in Percussion: Volume 2 (Somerset/Stereo-Fidelity, 1961)
- Swingin' Things from Can-Can (Somerset, 1961)

With Mark Murphy

- This Could Be the Start of Something (Capitol, 1958)
- Mark Murphy's Hip Parade (Capitol, 1959)

With Ted Nash

- Peter Gunn (Crown, 1959)

With Shorty Rogers

- Cool and Crazy (RCA Victor, 1953)
- Shorty Rogers Courts the Count (RCA Victor, 1954)
- The Big Shorty Rogers Express (RCA Victor, 1956)
- Martians Come Back! (Atlantic, 1956)
- Way Up There (Atlantic, 1957)
- Shorty Rogers Plays Richard Rodgers (RCA Victor, 1957)
- Portrait of Shorty (RCA Victor, 1958)
- Chances Are It Swings (RCA Victor, 1959)
- The Wizard of Oz and Other Harold Arlen Songs (RCA Victor, 1959)

With Pete Rugolo

- Introducing Pete Rugolo (Columbia, 1954)
- Adventures in Rhythm (Columbia, 1954)
- Rugolomania (Columbia, 1955)
- Music for Hi-Fi Bugs (EmArcy, 1956)
- New Sounds by Pete Rugolo (Harmony, 1957)
- Out on a Limb (EmArcy, 1957)
- An Adventure in Sound: Brass in Hi-Fi (Mercury, 1957)
- The Music from Richard Diamond (EmArcy, 1959)
- Behind Brigitte Bardot (Warner Bros., 1960)
- Ten Trumpets and 2 Guitars (Mercury, 1961)

With others

- Ray Anthony, Ray Anthony Plays Steve Allen (Capitol, 1958)
- Charlie Barnet, Big Band 1967 Mobile Fidelity (Creative World, 1986)
- Count Basie, Compositions of Count Basie and Others (Crown, 1959)
- Louie Bellson, Their Time Was the Greatest! (Concord Jazz, 1996)
- Irving Berlin, The Complete Irving Berlin Songbooks (Verve, 1997)
- Milt Bernhart, Modern Brass (RCA Victor, 1955)
- Milt Bernhart, The Sound of Bernhart (Decca, 1958)
- Elmer Bernstein, The Man with the Golden Arm (Decca, 1956)
- Elmer Bernstein, Sweet Smell of Success (Decca, 1957)
- Buddy Bregman, Swinging Kicks (Verve, 1957)
- Ray Brown, Bass Hit! (Verve, 1957)
- Sonny Burke, The Uncollected Sonny Burke and His Orchestra 1951 (Hindsight, 1981)
- Benny Carter, Aspects (United Artists, 1959)
- Benny Carter, The Benny Carter Jazz Calendar (United Artists, 1959)
- Rosemary Clooney, Clap Hands! Here Comes Rosie! (RCA Victor, 1960)
- Albert Collins, There's Gotta Be a Change (Tumbleweed, 1971)
- Bob Cooper, Coop! (Contemporary, 1958)
- Alexander Courage, Hot Rod Rumble (Liberty, 1957)
- Peggy Connelly, Peggy Connelly (Bethlehem, 1956)
- João Donato, A Bad Donato (Blue Thumb, 1970)
- The Doobie Brothers, I Cheat the Hangman (Warner Bros., 1975)
- The Doobie Brothers, Stampede (Warner Bros., 1975)
- Tommy Dorsey, One Night Stand (Sandy Hook, 1976)
- George Duning, Bell, Book and Candle (Colpix, 1958)
- Billy Eckstine, Billy Eckstine's Imagination (Mercury, 1959)
- Dennis Farnon, Caution! Men Swinging (RCA Victor, 1957)
- Ella Fitzgerald, Ella Fitzgerald Sings the Cole Porter Song Book (Verve, 1956)
- Ella Fitzgerald, Ella Fitzgerald Sings the Rodgers and Hart Song Book (Verve, 1956)
- Dominic Frontiere, On Any Sunday (Bell, 1971)
- Russell Garcia, Wigville (Bethlehem, 1955)
- Mitzi Gaynor, Sings the Lyrics of Ira Gershwin (LPTime, 2009)
- John Graas, John Graas! (Mercury, 1958)
- Jerry Gray, The Uncollected 1949–50 (Hindsight, 1985)
- Lionel Hampton, Aurex Jazz Festival '81 (EastWorld, 1981)
- Lionel Hampton, Ambassador at Large (Glad-Hamp, 1990)
- Al Hibbler, Sings the Blues Monday Every Day (Reprise, 1961)
- Lena Horne, Lovely and Alive (Fresh Sound/RCA Victor, 1985)
- Neal Hefti, Jazz Pops (Reprise, 1962)
- Quincy Jones, Go West Man! (ABC-Paramount, 1957)
- Fred Katz, Folk Songs for Far Out Folk (Warner Bros., 1959)
- Fred Katz, Fred Katz and his Jammers (Decca, 1960)
- Frankie Laine, Rockin' (Columbia, 1957)
- Vicky Lane, I Swing for You (LPTime, 2010)
- Jimmie Lunceford, Swing Goes On! Vol.7 (EMI/Electrola, 1978)
- Billy May, Billy May's Big Fat Brass (Capitol, 1958)
- Billy May, The Girls and Boys On Broadway (Capitol, 1983)
- Junior Mance, Get Ready, Set, Jump!!! (Capitol, 1964)
- Junior Mance, Straight Ahead! (Capitol, 1965)
- Gerry Mulligan, Walking Shoes (Capitol, 1972)
- Gerry Mulligan, Gene Norman Presents the Original Gerry Mulligan Tentet and Quartet (GNP, 1997)
- Mark Murphy, Mark Murphy's Hip Parade (Capitol, 1960)
- Ted Nash, Peter Gunn (Crown, 1959)
- Anita O'Day, Pick Yourself Up with Anita O'Day (Verve, 1990)
- Anita O'Day and Billy May, Swing Rodgers and Hart (Verve, 2004)
- Patti Page, In the Land of Hi-Fi (Mercury, 1959)
- Marty Paich, The Picasso of Big Band Jazz (Discovery, 1982)
- Art Pepper, Art Pepper + Eleven (Contemporary, 1959)
- Jane Powell, Can't We Be Friends? (LPTime, 2009)
- Frankie Randall, Sings & Swings (RCA Victor, 1965)
- Buddy Rich, This One's for Basie (Norgran, 1956)
- Johnny Richards, Something Else by Johnny Richards (Bethlehem, 1956)
- Nelson Riddle, (Contemporary, Sound of Nelson Riddle (United Artists, 1968)
- Annie Ross and Buddy Bregman, Gypsy (Pacific Jazz, 1995)
- Jimmy Rowles, Let's Get Acquainted with Jazz ...for People Who Hate Jazz! (Tampa, 1959)
- Howard Rumsey, Jazz Rolls Royce (Lighthouse, 1958)
- Tak Shindo, Brass and Bamboo (Capitol, 1960)
- Bobby Short, Bobby Short (Atlantic, 1956)
- Dan Terry, The Complete Vita Recordings of Dan Terry
- Mel Tormé, Mel Tormé Sings Fred Astaire (Bethlehem, 1956)
- Mel Tormé, Mel Tormé with the Marty Paich Dek-Tette (Bethlehem, 1956)
- Mel Tormé, Mel Tormé's California Suite (Avenue Jazz, 1999)
- Bobby Troup, Bobby Troup and His Stars of Jazz (RCA Victor, 1959)
- Franz Waxman, Crime in the Streets (Decca, 1956)
- Stanley Wilson, The Music from M Squad (RCA Victor, 1959)
