= The Wizard of Oz and Other Harold Arlen Songs =

Studio album by Shorty Rogers and His Orchestra Featuring The Giants
- Released: 1959
- Recorded: February 3, 5 & 10, 1959; Los Angeles, CA
- Genre: Jazz
- Length: 41:01
- Label: RCA Victor

Shorty Rogers chronology
Chances Are It Swings (1958)	The Wizard of Oz and Other Harold Arlen Songs (1959)	Shorty Rogers Meets Tarzan (1960)

The Wizard of Oz and Other Harold Arlen Songs is an album by American jazz trumpeter and arranger Shorty Rogers performing songs composed by Harold Arlen including several from The Wizard of Oz. The album was issued by RCA Victor in 1959.

== Reception ==
Professional ratings
Review scores
Source	Rating
Allmusic	4/5 stars
The Penguin Guide to Jazz Recordings	3/4 stars

Allmusic awarded the album 4 stars calling it "Wonderful music".

== Track listing ==
All compositions by Harold Arlen and E. Y. "Yip" Harburg except where noted.

1. "We're Off to See the Wizard" - 1:20
2. "Over the Rainbow" - 3:01
3. "The Jitterbug" - 3:17
4. "The Merry Old Land of Oz" - 5:35
5. "If I Only Had a Brain" - 3:28
6. "Ding-Dong! The Witch Is Dead" - 3:31
7. "My Shining Hour" - 3:36
8. "Get Happy" (Arlen, Ted Koehler) - 2:44
9. "Blues in the Night" (Arlen, Johnny Mercer) - 5:47
10. "Let's Fall in Love" (Arlen, Koehler) - 3:17
11. "That Old Black Magic" (Arlen, Mercer) - 5:25
- Recorded in Los Angeles, CA on February 3, 1959 (tracks 4, 5 & 7), February 5, 1959 (tracks 3, 6, 8 & 10) and February 10, 1959 (tracks 1, 2, 9 & 11)

== Personnel ==
- Shorty Rogers - trumpet, flugelhorn, arranger
- Pete Candoli, Buddy Childers, Don Fagerquist, Ollie Mitchell, Al Porcino, Ray Triscari - trumpet
- Harry Betts, Marshall Cram, Frank Rosolino - trombone
- Bob Enevoldsen - valve trombone
- Jimmy Giuffre - clarinet
- Herb Geller - alto saxophone, tenor saxophone
- Bud Shank - alto saxophone
- Bill Holman - tenor saxophone
- Chuck Gentry - baritone saxophone
- Larry Bunker - vibraphone
- Barney Kessel - guitar
- Pete Jolly - piano
- Joe Mondragon - bass
- Mel Lewis - drums
