= Bossa Nova (Shorty Rogers album) =

Studio album by Shorty Rogers and His Giants
- Released: 1962
- Recorded: June 12–14, 1962
- Studios: United Recording, Los Angeles, CA
- Genre: Jazz
- Length: 32:32
- Labels: Reprise; R 6050
- Producer: Chuck Sagle

Shorty Rogers chronology
The Fourth Dimension in Sound (1961)	Bossa Nova (1962)	Jazz Waltz (1963)

Bossa Nova (also released as Return to Rio) is an album by American jazz trumpeter, composer and arranger Shorty Rogers, released on the Reprise label in 1962.

== Reception ==
Professional ratings
Review scores
Source	Rating
Allmusic	2/5 stars

On All About Jazz Dave Rickert said: "Bossa Nova must have appeared fresh at the time—it was recorded in 1962, a year before the Brazilian music craze—but now seems buried in a pack of like-minded albums. Rogers did have the presence of mind to recruit a guitarist and a few percussionists to give the music an authentic flavor, and the music is earnestly played. However, bossa nova works best with a less rambunctious approach. Rogers never seemed capable of approaching anything delicately, and he overwhelms the melodies with brassy riffs. Not bad, but when you’re tempted to reach for a big band or a bossa nova record, Bossa Nova won’t come to mind in either case". On Allmusic, Scott Yanow noted: "The emphasis is on ensembles with occasional statements from Rogers but surprisingly little happens. The overall results are pleasant but a bit of a disappointment".

== Track listing ==
All compositions by Shorty Rogers except where noted.

1. "Samba do Lorinho (Lorito's Samba)" - 2:07
2. "Chega de Saudade (No More Sadness)" (Antônio Carlos Jobim, Vinícius de Moraes) - 2:17
3. "Samba Triste (Melancholy Samba)" (Billy Blanco, Baden Powell) - 2:55
4. "Samba de Uma Nota So (One Note Samba)" (Jobim, Newton Mendonça) - 2:55
5. "Pao de Assucar (Sugar Loaf)" - 5:03
6. "Samba do Empashgi (Empashgi's Samba)" - 4:05
7. "O Amor E a Rosa (Love Is a Rose)" (João Pernambuco, Antônio Maria) - 3:04
8. "So Voce (Only You)" (Laurindo Almeida, Shorty Rogers) - 2:31
9. "Chora Tua Tristeza (Cry Your Sadness)" (Oscar Castro-Neves) - 3:23
10. "So Um Amor (Only One Love)" (Almeida, Rogers) - 1:47
11. "O Menino Desce O Morro (Little Brown Boy)" (Vera Brazil) - 2:25

== Personnel ==
- Shorty Rogers - flugelhorn, arranger, conductor
- Joe Burnett, Ollie Mitchell - trumpet
- Paul Horn, Bud Shank - alto saxophone, flute
- Richard Leith, Kenneth Shroyer - trombone
- Pete Jolly - piano
- Joe Mondragon - bass
- Laurindo Almeida - guitar
- Larry Bunker - vibraphone
- Milt Holland, Shelly Manne - drums
- Emil Richards, Chico Guerrero - percussion
