= The Fourth Dimension in Sound =

Studio album by Shorty Rogers
- Released: 1962
- Recorded: November 10, 22 & 24, 1961; Hollywood, California
- Genre: Jazz
- Length: 37:17
- Label: Warner Bros. BS 1443/WS 8102
- Producer: Shorty Rogers

Shorty Rogers chronology
An Invisible Orchard (1961)	The Fourth Dimension in Sound (1962)	Bossa Nova (1962)

The Fourth Dimension in Sound (subtitled A Musical Experiment in the Adaptation of Instruments to Modern Electronics) is an album by bandleader and arranger Shorty Rogers recorded in late 1961 and released on the Warner Bros. label. The album was produced principally as a stereo test and demonstration record to be used by hi-fi enthusiasts to test the performance of their audio systems.

== Reception ==
Professional ratings
Review scores
Source	Rating
Allmusic	2.5/5 stars
The Penguin Guide to Jazz Recordings	3/4 stars
New Record Mirror	4/5 stars

The Allmusic review by Scott Yanow states: "As was true of many records from the early 1960s, the emphasis on this out-of-print Lp (especially in the lengthy liner notes) is on the stereophonic sound rather than the music. ... The music is better than the liner notes (which spend most of their time describing the sound) lets on but is not all that significant, emphasizing swing standards along with an occasional Latin novelty."

== Track listing ==
1. "One O'Clock Jump" (Count Basie) - 3:40
2. "Speak Low" (Kurt Weill, Ogden Nash) - 3:34
3. "Tonight" (Leonard Bernstein, Stephen Sondheim) - 2:56
4. "Lover" (Richard Rodgers, Lorenz Hart) - 4:49
5. "Marie" (Irving Berlin) - 4:06
6. "Kook-a-Ra-Cha Waltz" (Traditional) - 2:51
7. "You're Just in Love" (Berlin) - 3:15
8. "I'm Getting Sentimental Over You" (George Bassman, Ned Washington) - 2:42
9. "Stompin' at the Savoy" (Edgar Sampson, Benny Goodman, Chick Webb, Andy Razaf) - 3:03
10. "Baubles, Bangles and Beads" (Robert Wright and George Forrest) - 3:07
11. "Taboo" (Margarita Lecuona, Bob Russell) - 3:14
- Recorded in Hollywood, CA on November 10, 1961 (tracks 2, 4 & 9), November 22, 1961 (tracks 1, 3, 6 & 10) and November 24, 1961 (tracks 5, 7, 8 & 11)

== Personnel ==
- Shorty Rogers - flugelhorn, arranger, conductor
- George Roberts (tracks 1, 3, 6 & 10), Ken Shroyer (tracks 2, 5, 7-9 & 11) - trombone
- Buddy Collette (tracks 2, 5, 7-9 & 11), Bill Hood, Paul Horn (tracks 1–4, 6 & 10), Bud Shank - reeds
- Pete Jolly - piano
- Emil Richards - vibraphone
- Red Mitchell (tracks 2, 4, 5, 7-9 & 11), Joe Mondragon (tracks 1, 3, 6 & 10) - bass
- Shelly Manne - drums
