= Jazz Waltz (Shorty Rogers album) =

Studio album by Shorty Rogers and His Giants
- Released: 1963
- Recorded: December 1962
- Studio: United Recording, Los Angeles, CA
- Genre: Jazz
- Length: 39:53
- Label: Reprise; R 6060
- Producer: Chuck Sagle

Shorty Rogers chronology
Bossa Nova (1962)	Jazz Waltz (1963)	Mavis Meets Shorty (1963)

Jazz Waltz is an album by American jazz trumpeter, composer and arranger Shorty Rogers, released on the Reprise label in 1963.

== Reception ==
Professional ratings
Review scores
Source	Rating
Allmusic	4/5 stars

On All About Jazz Dave Rickert said "the novelty of ¾ time in music is still fresh even today and Joe Mondragon and Mel Lewis create a seemingly infinite variety of ways to swing in waltz time. Rogers contributes a few catchy melodies (in particular the title track) and creates lovely charts". Allmusic noted "Shorty Rogers' Jazz Waltz is exactly that, an exploration of ten compositions played in waltz settings. Only these big-band charts are hardly the waltzes heard on Lawrence Welk's long-running television series".

== Track listing ==
All compositions by Shorty Rogers except where noted.

1. "I'm Gonna Go Fishin'" (Duke Ellington, Peggy Lee) - 4:31
2. "Greensleeves" (Traditional) - 5:26
3. "Walk on the Wild Side" (Elmer Bernstein) - 4:15
4. "Witchcraft" (Cy Coleman, Carolyn Leigh) - 2:55
5. "Be as Children" - 3:33
6. "Jazz Waltz" - 4:05
7. "Echoes of Harlem" (Ellington) - 4:39
8. "A Taste of Honey" (Ric Marlowe, Bobby Scott) - 2:51
9. "Terrence's Farewell" - 3:32
10. "The Streets of Laredo" - 4:06

== Personnel ==
- Shorty Rogers - flugelhorn, arranger, conductor
- Joe Burnett, Ollie Mitchell - trumpet, flugelhorn
- Al Porcino, Ray Triscari - trumpet (tracks 1, 3, 5 & 6)
- Milt Bernhardt, Harry Betts - trombone (tracks 1, 3, 5 & 6)
- George Roberts (tracks 1, 3, 5 & 6), Kenneth Shroyer - bass trombone
- Paul Horn, Bud Shank - alto saxophone, flute
- Joe Manis - alto saxophone (tracks 1, 3, 5 & 6)
- Bill Perkins - tenor saxophone (tracks 1, 3, 5 & 6)
- Bill Hood - baritone saxophone (tracks 1, 3, 5 & 6)
- Pete Jolly - piano
- Joe Mondragon - bass
- Larry Bunker (tracks 1, 3, 5 & 6), Emil Richards (tracks 2, 4 & 7–10) - vibraphone
- Mel Lewis - drums
