= Mavis Meets Shorty =

Studio album by Mavis Rivers and Shorty Rogers
- Released: 1963
- Recorded: 1962
- Genre: Jazz
- Labels: Reprise; R 6074
- Producer: Chuck Sagle

Shorty Rogers chronology
Jazz Waltz (1963)	Mavis Meets Shorty (1963)	Gospel Mission (1963)

Mavis Meets Shorty is an album by vocalist Mavis Rivers and trumpeter Shorty Rogers, released on the Reprise label in 1963.

== Reception ==
Professional ratings
Review scores
Source	Rating
Allmusic	3/5 stars

Allmusic awarded the album 3 stars.

== Track listing ==
1. "I Remember You" (Victor Schertzinger, Johnny Mercer) – 2:07
2. "You Brought a New Kind of Love to Me" (Sammy Fain, Irving Kahal, Pierre Norman) – 2:59
3. "When Sunny Gets Blue" (Jack Segal, Marvin Fischer) – 2:23
4. "Nothing But the Best" (Johnny Rotella) – 2:43
5. "I Feel So Smoochie" (Phil Moore) – 2:34
6. "Im Gonna Live Till I Die" (Al Hoffman, Walter Kent, Manny Curtis) – 3:07
7. "The Best Is Yet to Come" (Cy Coleman, Carolyn Leigh) – 2:33
8. "I've Got You Under My Skin" (Cole Porter) – 3:02
9. "Slightly Out of Tune (Desafinado)" (Antônio Carlos Jobim, Newton Mendonça, Jon Hendricks, Jessie Cavanaugh) – 2:14
10. "My Shining Hour" (Harold Arlen, Johnny Mercer) – 1:48
11. "By Myself" (Arthur Schwartz, Howard Dietz) – 1:56
12. "Get Out of Town" (Porter) – 2:08

== Personnel ==
- Mavis Rivers – vocals
- Shorty Rogers – trumpet
- Unidentified orchestra and string section arranged and conducted by Chuck Sagle including:
  - Red Callender – tuba
  - Richard Grove – piano
