= Gary Barone (musician) =

American jazz trumpeter and flugelhornist (1941–2019)

- Born: December 12, 1941; Detroit, Michigan, U.S.
- Died: December 24, 2019 (aged 78); Freiburg, Germany
- Education: Michigan State University (BA); Portland State University (MA)
- Occupation: Musician
- Relatives: Mike Barone (brother)

Gary Barone (December 12, 1941- December 24, 2019) was an American jazz trumpeter and flugelhornist.

== Early life and education ==
Barone was born in Detroit. He father was trumpeter Joe Barone, who taught him to play from an early age. His brother, Mike Barone, was a jazz trombonist. Gary earned a bachelor's degree from Michigan State University in 1965 and did graduate work at San Fernando Valley State College from 1965 to 1967.

== Career ==
In the late-1960s, Barone worked with Stan Kenton, Gerald Wilson, and Bud Shank, as well as Mike Barone's ensemble. He began working with Shelly Manne in 1969, remaining with him until 1973; during this time he also began doing more work as a session musician for film and television soundtracks (including for Dave Grusin, Lalo Schifrin, and Tom Scott). In the 1970s, he also worked with Frank Zappa, Willie Bobo, and Frank Strazzeri.

Barone continued his musical studies in the 1980s with Dick Grove, and in 1991, graduated from Portland State University with a Master of Arts degree in economics. He also worked with David Friesen in the early 1990s. In 1995 he moved to Freiburg im Bresgau, in Germany, where he played with Jiggs Whigham, Waldi Heidepriem, Christof Lauer, Tony Lakatos and Albert Mangelsdorff. He taught at the Hochschule für Kunst, Design und Populäre Musik Freiburg.
