= My Fair Lady with the Un-original Cast =

Studio album by Shelly Manne
- Released: 1964
- Recorded: July 28, and August 3, 4 & 6, 1964
- Studio: Capitol (Hollywood)
- Genre: Jazz
- Length: 39:26
- Label: Capitol T/ST 2173
- Producer: Dave Cavanaugh

Shelly Manne chronology
My Son the Jazz Drummer! (1962)	My Fair Lady with the Un-original Cast (1964)	Manne–That's Gershwin! (1966)

My Fair Lady with the Un-original Cast is an album by drummer Shelly Manne with Jack Sheldon and Irene Kral and musical direction by Johnny Williams, recorded in 1964 and released on the Capitol label. The album, featuring Alan Jay Lerner and Frederick Loewe's music from the Broadway musical My Fair Lady, sought to capitalize on Manne's previously successful My Fair Lady album and the contemporaneous film adaptation.

== Reception ==
Professional ratings
Review scores
Source	Rating
AllMusic	3/5 stars

The AllMusic review stated: "An interesting but not essential release".

== Track listing ==
All compositions by Alan Jay Lerner and Frederick Loewe

1. "Overture/Why Can't the English" – 3:45
2. "Wouldn't It Be Loverly" – 3:00
3. "With a Little Bit of Luck" – 3:15
4. "I'm an Ordinary Man" – 3:38
5. "The Rain in Spain" – 4:38
6. "I Could Have Danced All Night" – 2:38
7. "Ascot Gavotte" – 2:29
8. "On the Street Where You Live" – 3:20
9. "You Did It" – 2:16
10. "Show Me" – 2:57
11. "Get Me to the Church on Time" – 3:30
12. "I've Grown Accustomed to Her Face" – 4:00

== Personnel ==
- Shelly Manne – drums
- Irene Kral (tracks 2, 5 & 10), Jack Sheldon (tracks 1, 4, 5 & 9)- vocals
- Conte Candoli, Al Porcino, Don Sleet, Ray Triscari, Jimmy Zito – trumpet
- Bob Edmondson, Frank Rosolino, Mike Barone – trombone
- Richard Perissi, James Decker – French horn
- John Bambridge – tuba
- Charlie Kennedy – alto saxophone
- Jack Nimitz, Justin Gordon, Paul Horn – woodwinds
- Russ Freeman – piano
- Monty Budwig – bass
- John Williams – arranger, musical director
- Unidentified string section
