= Afro-Cuban Influence =

Studio album by Shorty Rogers
- Released: 1958
- Recorded: June 19 & 26, 1958
- Studio: Radio Recorders, Los Angeles
- Genre: Jazz
- Length: 42:34
- Label: RCA Victor
- Producer: Dick Pierce

Shorty Rogers chronology
Gigi in Jazz (1958)	Afro-Cuban Influence (1958)	Chances Are It Swings (1958)

Afro-Cuban Influence is an album by American jazz trumpeter and arranger Shorty Rogers which was released by RCA Victor in 1958.

== Reception ==
Professional ratings
Review scores
Source	Rating
Allmusic	4.5/5 stars

Allmusic called it a "highly recommended LP".

== Track listing ==
1. "Wuayacañanga Suite" (Carlos Vidal, Modesto Duran, Shorty Rogers) – 21:58
2. "Manteca" (Chano Pozo, Dizzy Gillespie, Gil Fuller) – 9:02
3. "Moon Over Cuba" (Duke Ellington, Juan Tizol) – 4:12
4. "Viva Puente" (Shorty Rogers) – 3:39
5. "Un Poco Loco" (Bud Powell) – 3:36

== Personnel ==
- Shorty Rogers – flugelhorn, arranger
- Buddy Childers, Don Fagerquist, Ed Leddy, Al Porcino, Ray Triscari – trumpet
- Bob Enevoldsen – valve trombone
- Harry Betts, George Roberts, Frank Rosolino, Ken Shroyer – trombone
- Bud Shank – flute, alto saxophone
- Herb Geller – alto saxophone
- Bob Cooper, Bill Holman – tenor saxophone
- Bill Hood – tenor saxophone, baritone saxophone
- Chuck Gentry – baritone saxophone
- Joe Mondragon – bass
- Shelly Manne – drums
- Carlos Vidal, Frank Guerrero, Juan Cheda, Luis Miranda, Manuel Ochoa, Mike Pacheco, Modesto Duran, Sirelda Gonzalez – percussion, vocals
