= Chances Are It Swings =

Studio album by Shorty Rogers and His Orchestra Featuring the Giants
- Released: 1959
- Recorded: December 9, 12 & 20, 1958; Los Angeles, CA
- Genre: Jazz
- Length: 36:47
- Label: RCA Victor
- Producer: Dick Peirce

Shorty Rogers chronology
Afro-Cuban Influence (1958)	Chances Are It Swings (1959)	The Wizard of Oz and Other Harold Arlen Songs (1959)

Chances Are It Swings is an album by American jazz trumpeter and arranger Shorty Rogers performing compositions by Robert Allen which was released on the RCA Victor label in 1959.

== Reception ==
Professional ratings
Review scores
Source	Rating
Allmusic	4/5 stars
The Penguin Guide to Jazz Recordings	3/4 stars

Allmusic awarded the album 4 stars.

== Track listing ==
All compositions by Robert Allen and Al Stillman except where noted.

1. "Chances Are" - 3:19
2. "No Such Luck" - 2:19
3. "It's Not For Me To Say" - 4:38
4. "Lilac Chiffon" (Robert Allen, Peter Lind Hayes) - 4:01
5. "I Just Don't Know" (Robert Allen, Joe Stone) - 4:27
6. "Who Needs You?" - 2:58
7. "Everybody Loves a Lover" (Robert Allen, Richard Adler) - 3:50
8. "Come to Me" (Allen, Hayes) - 2:48
9. "My Very Good Friend in the Looking Glass" - 3:33
10. "You Know How It Is" - 3:22
11. "A Very Special Love" (Allen) - 2:00
12. "Teacher, Teacher" - 2:37

== Personnel ==
- Shorty Rogers - trumpet, flugelhorn, arranger
- Conte Candoli, Pete Candoli, Don Fagerquist, Ollie Mitchell, Al Porcino, Ray Triscari - trumpet
- Harry Betts, Dick Nash, Ken Shroyer - trombone
- Bob Enevoldsen - valve trombone
- Paul Horn, Bud Shank - clarinet, flute, alto saxophone
- Bill Holman, Richie Kamuca - tenor saxophone
- Chuck Gentry - baritone saxophone
- Gene Estes - vibraphone
- Barney Kessel, Howard Roberts - guitar
- Pete Jolly - piano
- Joe Mondragon - bass
- Mel Lewis - drums
