= Martians Stay Home =

1980 studio album by Shorty Rogers and His Giants

Studio album by Shorty Rogers and His Giants
- Released: 1980
- Recorded: March 1, October 21 and November 3, 1955
- Studio: Capitol Studios in Hollywood, CA
- Genre: Jazz
- Length: 46:07
- Label: Atlantic; K 50714
- Producer: Nesuhi Ertegun

Shorty Rogers chronology
The Swinging Mr. Rogers (1955)	Martians Stay Home (1980)	Martians Come Back! (1955)

Martians Stay Home is an album by American jazz trumpeter, composer and arranger Shorty Rogers, featuring previously unreleased recordings from the 1955 sessions which produced The Swinging Mr. Rogers and Martians Come Back!, and first released on the Atlantic label in 1980.

== Reception ==
Professional ratings
Review scores
Source	Rating
Allmusic	4/5 stars

Michael G. Nastos on Allmusic wrote: "These are nice groups with Rogers's sensitive trumpet leading in a non-threatening, mainstream groove."

== Track listing ==
All compositions by Shorty Rogers except where noted.

1. "Loaded" (Bernie Miller) - 6:40
2. "Martians Stay Home" - 6:33
3. "The Lady in Red" (Allie Wrubel, Mort Dixon) - 6:01
4. "Amber Leaves" - 4:13
5. "Bill" - 3:04
6. "Barbaro" - 4:35
7. "Peals" - 5:09
8. "12th Street Rag" (Euday L. Bowman, Andy Razaf) - 4:46
9. "Easy" - 4:24
- Recorded at Capitol Studios in Hollywood, CA on March 1, 1955 (tracks 1, 3, 5 & 8), October 21, 1955 (track 6) and November 3, 1955 (tracks 2, 4, 7 & 9)

== Personnel ==
- Shorty Rogers - trumpet, flugelhorn
- Jimmy Giuffre - clarinet, tenor saxophone, baritone saxophone
- Pete Jolly (tracks 1, 3, 5 & 8), Lou Levy (tracks 2, 4, 6, 7 & 9) - piano
- Curtis Counce (tracks 1, 3, 5 & 8), Ralph Pena (tracks 2, 4, 6, 7 & 9) - bass
- Shelly Manne - drums
