= Pete Jolly =

American jazz pianist and accordionist (1932–2004)

- Born: Peter A. Ceragioli Jr. June 5, 1932; New Haven, Connecticut, United States
- Died: November 6, 2004 (aged 72) Pasadena, California, United States
- Genres: Jazz
- Occupations: Musician, composer
- Instruments: Piano, accordion
- Years active: 1947–2004

Pete Jolly (born Peter A. Ceragioli Jr., June 5, 1932 – November 6, 2004) was a two-time Grammy-nominated American West Coast jazz pianist and accordionist. He is known for his performance of television themes and movie soundtracks.

== Biography ==
Jolly began playing the accordion at age three and appeared on the radio program Hobby Lobby at the age of seven. He was raised in Phoenix, Arizona, a hotbed of jazz at the time. One of his best friends and collaborators in Phoenix was guitarist Howard Roberts, whom he met at the age of 13. Following Roberts to Los Angeles in 1952, he immediately began working with the best players on the West Coast jazz scene, including Shorty Rogers. He moved easily into studio and session work. Besides his performances as a pianist, he also played the accordion, often ranking among the top three in the Down Beat reader's polls during the mid to late 1950s.

His composition "Little Bird" (a minor hit on Fred Astaire's Ava Records) was nominated for a Grammy Award in 1963, and he formed the Pete Jolly Trio in 1964. With the Trio and as a solo artist, he recorded several albums, including earning a Grammy nomination for Best Instrumental Jazz Performance – Small Group or Soloist with Small Group. One of the last albums was a collaboration—aptly entitled Collaboration—with Jan Lundgren, Chuck Berghofer, and Joe LaBarbera in 2000. His final album, It's a Cool Heat, was recorded in Phoenix in May 2004 shortly before his death. He worked with Buddy DeFranco, Art Pepper, and Red Norvo, and for many years with music arranger and director Ray Conniff and Herb Alpert, recording on Alpert's record label, A&M as both sideman and leader.

Jolly's music can be heard on television programs such as Get Smart, The Love Boat, I Spy, Mannix, M*A*S*H and Dallas, as well as hundreds of movie soundtracks. He recreated some of Bud Powell's playing with Charlie Parker for Clint Eastwood's biographical movie about Parker, Bird. By day, Jolly worked in the studios; by night, with his trio. He continued to perform with his trio in Los Angeles jazz clubs until shortly before being hospitalized in August 2004. His final public performance with his trio was in Reno, Nevada. Jolly died at the age of 72 in November 2004 in Pasadena, California, from complications of multiple myeloma. He is buried at San Gabriel Cemetery in San Gabriel, California.

== Reception ==
The Pete Jolly Trio had only one bassist, Chuck Berghofer, and one drummer, Nick Martinis. Berghofer later said, "In all that time, Pete never once told me how to play or what to play."

== Discography ==
=== As leader/co-leader ===
Year recorded	Title	Label	Notes
1955	Jolly Jumps In	RCA Victor	With Shorty Rogers (trumpet), Jimmy Giuffre (tenor sax, baritone sax), Howard Roberts (guitar), Curtis Counce (bass), Shelly Manne (drums)
1955?	Duo, Trio, Quartet	RCA Victor	
1956?	When Lights Are Low	RCA Victor	
1959?	Impossible	MetroJazz	
1960	The Duo	VSOP	Duo, with Ralph Peña (bass)
1962?	5 O'Clock Shadows	MGM	
	Continental Jazz	Stereo Fidelity	
1963?	The Sensational Pete Jolly Gasses Everybody	Charlie Parker	
1963	Little Bird	Äva	Some tracks trio, with Chuck Berghofer (bass), Larry Bunker (drums); some tracks with Howard Roberts (guitar), Kenny Hume (percussion) added
1963	Sweet September	Äva	Most tracks trio, with Chuck Berghofer (bass), Larry Bunker (drums); some tracks quartet, with Howard Roberts (guitar), Berghofer (bass), Nick Martinis (drums); Nominated for a Grammy for Best Instrumental Jazz Performance – Small Group or Soloist with Small Group
1964	Hello, Jolly!	Äva	Two tracks trio, with Chuck Berghofer (bass), Howard Roberts (guitar), and Nick Martinez (drums); all others with orchestra arranged and conducted by either Dick Hazard or Dick Grove.
1960–65?	Live in L.A.: Red Chimney and Sherry's Bar	VSOP	Most tracks with Chuck Berghofer and Ralph Peña (bass; separately), Nick Martinis (drums); in concert; released 1994
1965?	Too Much, Baby	Columbia	Trio, with Chuck Berghofer (bass), Nick Martinis (drums)
1968?	Herb Alpert Presents Pete Jolly	A&M	With John Pisano (guitar), Chuck Berghofer (bass), Earl Palmer (drums), orchestra
1969	Timeless	VSOP	With Chuck Berghofer (bass), Nick Ceroli (drums)
1970?	Give a Damn	A&M	With Chuck Berghofer (bass), Nick Ceroli (drums), brass; in concert
1970?	Seasons	A&M	With Chuck Berghofer (bass), Paul Humphrey (drums), John Pisano (guitar), Milt Holland and Emil Richards (percussion), brass
1980?	Strike Up the Band	Atlas	
1993?	Yours Truly	Bainbridge	Trio, with Chuck Berghofer (bass), Nick Martinis (drums)
	Gems	Holt	
1995	Yeah!	VSOP	With Chuck Berghofer (bass), Nick Martinis (drums)
2001	Collaboration	Fresh Sound	With Jan Lundgren (piano), Chuck Berghofer (bass), Joe LaBarbera (drums)

Compilations

- Quartet, Quintet & Sextet (Fresh Sound, 1955–56)
- Pete Jolly and Friends (VSOP, 1962–64)

=== As sideman ===
With Elmer Bernstein

- The Man with the Golden Arm (Decca, 1956)

With Kenny Burrell

- Heritage (AudioSource, 1980)

With The Carnival

- The Carnival (World Pacific, 1969)

With Buddy Collette

- Porgy & Bess (Interlude 1957 [1959])

With Jerry Donato

- It's a Cool Heat (Tempest, 2005)

With Joni James

- After Hours (MGM, 1962)

With J. J. Johnson

- Concepts in Blue (Pablo Today, 1981)

With Quincy Jones

- Roots (A&M, 1977)

With Johnny Mandel

- I Want to Live (United Artists, 1958)

With Gerry Mulligan

- I Want to Live (United Artists, 1958)
- If You Can't Beat 'Em, Join 'Em! (Limelight, 1965)

With Jack Nitzsche

- Heart Beat (Soundtrack) (Capitol, 1980)

With Shorty Rogers

- Shorty Rogers and His Giants (RCA Victor, 1954 [1956])
- The Swinging Mr. Rogers (Atlantic, 1955)
- Martians Stay Home (Atlantic, 1955 [1980])
- Martians Come Back! (Atlantic, 1955 [1956])
- Way Up There (Atlantic, 1955 [1957])
- Shorty Rogers Plays Richard Rodgers (RCA Victor, 1957)
- Gigi in Jazz (RCA Victor, 1958)
- Chances Are It Swings (RCA Victor, 1958)
- The Wizard of Oz and Other Harold Arlen Songs (RCA Victor, 1959)
- Shorty Rogers Meets Tarzan (MGM, 1960)
- The Swingin' Nutcracker (RCA Victor, 1960)
- The Music From An Invisible Orchard (RCA Victor, 1961 [1997])
- The Fourth Dimension in Sound (Warner Bros., 1961)
- Bossa Nova (Reprise, 1962)
- Jazz Waltz (Reprise, 1962)

With Tom Waits

- One from the Heart (film) soundtrack (CBS, 1982)
