= Shorty Rogers and His Giants =

Studio album by Shorty Rogers and His Giants
- Released: 1953
- Recorded: January 12 & 15, 1953 and October 10, 1954
- Studio: RCA Studios, Hollywood, CA
- Genre: Jazz
- Length: 35:46
- Label: RCA Victor; LPM 3137/LPM 1195
- Producer: Jack Lewis

Shorty Rogers chronology
Popo (1951)	Shorty Rogers and His Giants (1953)	Cool and Crazy (1953)

10 inch LP cover

Shorty Rogers and His Giants is an album by American jazz trumpeter, composer and arranger Shorty Rogers originally released by RCA Victor in 1953 as a 10-inch LP and reissued in 1956 in the 12 inch format with four additional tracks.

The nonet's pieces are kept in the cool jazz idiom, much like the similar in style but largely more successful Birth of the Cool, which was recorded 3 years earlier but appeared 4 years later. Also, the orchestration is comparable, featuring more unusual voices like the French horn and the tuba.

== Reception ==
Professional ratings
Review scores
Source	Rating
Allmusic	3/5 stars
The Penguin Guide to Jazz Recordings	3.5/4 stars

Allmusic awarded the album 3 stars.

== Track listing ==
All compositions by Shorty Rogers except where noted.

1. "Morpo" – 3:27
2. "Bunny" – 3:25
3. "Powder Puff" – 2:49
4. "Mambo del Crow" – 3:02
5. "Joycycle" – 2:39 Bonus track on 12 inch LP
6. "The Lady Is a Tramp" (Richard Rodgers, Lorenz Hart) – 2:17 Bonus track on 12 inch LP
7. "The Pesky Serpent" (Jimmy Giuffre) – 2:38
8. "Diablo's Dance" – 3:17
9. "Pirouette" – 3:10
10. "Indian Club" (Giuffre) – 2:35
11. "The Goof and I" (Al Cohn) – 2:53 Bonus track on 12 inch LP
12. "My Little Suede Shoes" (Charlie Parker) – 2:46 Bonus track on 12 inch LP
- Recorded at RCA Studios in Hollywood, CA on January 12, 1953 (tracks 2, 3, 7 & 9), January 15, 1953 (tracks 1, 4, 8 & 10) and October 10, 1954 (tracks 5, 6, 11 & 12)

== Personnel ==
- Shorty Rogers – trumpet, arranger
- Milt Bernhart – trombone (tracks 1–4 & 7–10)
- John Graas – French horn (tracks 1–4 & 7–10)
- Gene Englund – tuba (tracks 1–4 & 7–10)
- Art Pepper – alto saxophone (tracks 1–4 & 7–10)
- Jimmy Giuffre – tenor saxophone
- Hampton Hawes (tracks 1–4 & 7–10), Pete Jolly (tracks 5, 6, 11 & 12) – piano
- Curtis Counce (tracks 1–4 & 7–10), Joe Mondragon (tracks 5, 6, 11 & 12) – bass
- Shelly Manne – drums
