= The Swinging Mr. Rogers =

Studio album by Shorty Rogers and His Giants
- Released: 1955
- Recorded: March 1 & 3, 1955; Los Angeles, CA
- Genre: Jazz
- Length: 45:30
- Label: Atlantic; LP 1212
- Producer: Nesuhi Ertegun

Shorty Rogers chronology
Collaboration (1954)	The Swinging Mr. Rogers (1955)	Martians Stay Home (1955)

The Swinging Mr. Rogers is an album by American jazz trumpeter, composer and arranger Shorty Rogers, released on the Atlantic label in 1955.

== Reception ==
Professional ratings
Review scores
Source	Rating
Allmusic	4.5/5 stars
The Penguin Guide to Jazz Recordings	3.5/4 stars

Scott Yanow of Allmusic calls the album "one of trumpeter Shorty Rogers' finest small group sessions of the 1950s".

== Track listing ==
All compositions by Shorty Rogers except where noted.

1. "Isn't It Romantic?" (Richard Rodgers, Lorenz Hart) – 5:44
2. "Trickley Didlier" – 4:41
3. "Oh Play That Thing" – 6:31
4. "Not Really the Blues" (Johnny Mandel) – 4:58
5. "Martians Go Home" – 7:56
6. "My Heart Stood Still" (Rodgers, Hart) – 6:12
7. "Michele's Meditation" – 3:55
8. "That's What I'm Talkin' 'Bout" – 5:33

== Personnel ==
- Shorty Rogers – trumpet
- Jimmy Giuffre – clarinet, tenor saxophone, baritone saxophone
- Pete Jolly – piano
- Curtis Counce – bass
- Shelly Manne – drums
