= Wherever the Five Winds Blow =

Studio album by Shorty Rogers Quintet
- Released: 1957
- Recorded: July 2, 1956; Los Angeles, CA
- Genre: Jazz
- Length: 38:59
- Label: RCA Victor; LPM 1326

Shorty Rogers chronology
Way Up There (1955)	Wherever the Five Winds Blow (1957)	Shorty Rogers Plays Richard Rodgers (1957)

Wherever the Five Winds Blow is an album by American jazz trumpeter, composer and arranger Shorty Rogers, released by RCA Victor in 1957.

== Reception ==
Professional ratings
Review scores
Source	Rating
Allmusic	3/5 stars
The Penguin Guide to Jazz Recordings	3.5/4 stars

Allmusic awarded the album 3 stars.

== Track listing ==
All compositions by Shorty Rogers

1. "Hurricane Carol" - 5:59
2. "Breezin' Along in the Trades" - 9:14
3. "Marooned in a Monsoon" - 4:52
4. "The Chinook That Melted My Heart" - 10:18
5. "Prevailing on the Westerlies" - 8:36

== Personnel ==
- Shorty Rogers - trumpet
- Jimmy Giuffre - clarinet, saxophone
- Lou Levy - piano
- Ralph Pena - bass
- Larry Bunker - drums
