= An Invisible Orchard =

Studio album by Shorty Rogers and His Orchestra featuring The Giants
- Released: 1997
- Recorded: February 28 and April 18 & 26, 1961
- Studios: RCA Victor's Music Center of the World, Hollywood, CA
- Genre: Jazz
- Length: 43:51
- Labels: RCA Victor; 74321495602
- Producer: Dick Peirce

Shorty Rogers chronology
The Swingin' Nutcracker (1960)	An Invisible Orchard (1997)	The Fourth Dimension in Sound (1961)

An Invisible Orchard is an album by American jazz trumpeter, composer and arranger Shorty Rogers which was recorded for RCA Victor in 1961 but remained unreleased by the label until 1997.

== Track listing ==
All compositions by Shorty Rogers.

1. "Inner Space" - 4:42
2. "Saturnian Sunrise" - 4:03
3. "Light Years" - 4:39
4. "Like Space" - 4:12
5. "La Valse" - 5:32
6. "Lunar Montunar" - 5:14
7. "El Rojo Bajo" - 5:54
8. "An Invisible Orchard" - 9:35
- Recorded at RCA Victor's Music Center of the World, Hollywood, CA on February 28, 1961 (tracks 3–5), April 18, 1961 (tracks 1 & 8) and April 26, 1961 (tracks 2, 6 & 7)

== Personnel ==
- Shorty Rogers - flugelhorn, conductor, arranger
- Conte Candoli (tracks 3–5), Ollie Mitchell, Al Porcino (tracks 1, 2 & 6–8), Ray Triscari, Stu Williamson - trumpet
- Harry Betts, Frank Rosolino - trombone
- Marshall Cram (tracks 1 & 8), George Roberts (tracks 2–7), Kenneth Shroyer - bass trombone
- Paul Horn, Bud Shank - flute, alto saxophone
- Harold Land, Bill Perkins - tenor saxophone
- Chuck Gentry (tracks 3–5), Bill Hood (tracks 1, 2 & 6–8) - baritone saxophone
- Pete Jolly - piano
- Emil Richards - vibraphone
- Red Mitchell - bass
- Mel Lewis - drums
