= Popo (album) =

Studio album by Shorty Rogers and Art Pepper
- Released: 1980 (Remastered CD: 1994)
- Recorded: December 27, 1951 in Los Angeles
- Genre: Jazz, West Coast jazz, bebop, cool jazz
- Label: Xanadu # 148
- Producer: Don Schlitten and Bob Andrews

Shorty Rogers chronology
Modern Sounds (1951)	Popo (1980)	Shorty Rogers and His Giants (1953)

Popo is a West Coast jazz album with a previously unreleased 1951 recording session by trumpeter Shorty Rogers and his quintet. It was first released on LP in 1980 by Don Schlitten on his Xanadu label. Due to his prominence, the album cover gives credit to alto saxophonist Art Pepper as co-leader alongside Rogers who actually led the studio session on December 27 that also featured pianist Frank Patchen, Howard Rumsey on bass, and Shelly Manne on drums. At the time the musicians also played together at the Lighthouse club in Hermosa Beach as Howard Rumsey's Lighthouse All-Stars. Shortly after Art Pepper would lead his first quartet (with Hampton Hawes).

== Track listing ==
1. "Popo" (Shorty Rogers) – 4:19
2. "What's New?" (Bob Haggart, Johnny Burke) – 2:17
3. "Lullaby in Rhythm" (Clarence Profit, Edgar Sampson, Benny Goodman) - 5:22
4. "All the Things You Are" (Jerome Kern, Oscar Hammerstein II) - 2:58
5. "Robbins Nest" (Illinois Jacquet) - 4:49
6. "Scrapple from the Apple" (Charlie Parker) - 6:19
7. "Body and Soul" (Johnny Green, Edward Heyman, Robert Sour) - 3:20
8. "Jive at Five" (Harry Edison) - 5:27
9. "Tin Tin Deo" (Gil Fuller, Chano Pozo) - 4:06
10. "Cherokee" (Ray Noble) - 6:36

== Personnel ==
- Shorty Rogers - trumpet
- Art Pepper - alto saxophone
- Frank Patchen - piano
- Howard Rumsey - bass
- Shelly Manne - drums
