= The Swingin' Nutcracker =

Studio album by Shorty Rogers
- Released: 1960
- Recorded: May 3, 17 & 26, 1960
- Studio: RCA Victor's Music Center of the World, Hollywood, CA
- Genre: Jazz, Christmas
- Length: 52:56
- Label: RCA Victor
- Producer: Lee Schapiro

Shorty Rogers chronology
Shorty Rogers Meets Tarzan (1960)	The Swingin' Nutcracker (1960)	An Invisible Orchard (1961)

The Swingin' Nutcracker is a 1960 RCA Victor album by American jazz trumpeter and arranger Shorty Rogers performing compositions adapted from The Nutcracker by Pyotr Ilyich Tchaikovsky.

== Reception ==
Professional ratings
Review scores
Source	Rating
Allmusic	3/5 stars

Allmusic awarded the album 3 stars.

== Track listing ==
All compositions adapted from The Nutcracker Suite by Tchaikovsky and arranged by Shorty Rogers.

1. "Like Nutty Overture (Finale)" - 5:23
2. "A Nutty Marche (Marche)" - 3:28
3. " Blue Reeds (Reed Flute Blues)" - 5:27
4. "The Swingin' Plum Fairy (Dance of the Sugar Plum Fairy)" - 2:58
5. "Snowball (Waltz of the Snowflakes)" - 3:03
6. "Six Pak (Trépak)" - 2:44
7. "Flowers of the Cats (Waltz of the Flowers)" - 3:28
8. "Dance Expresso (Coffee)" - 2:55
9. "Pass the Duke (Pas de Deux)" - 2:51
10. "China Where? (Tea Dance)" - 2:09
11. "Overture for Shorty (Overture in Miniature)" - 4:01

== Personnel ==
- Shorty Rogers - conductor, arranger
- Johnny Audino, Conte Candoli, Ray Triscari, Jimmy Zito - trumpet
- Harry Betts, Frank Rosolino, Kenneth Shroyer - trombone
- George Roberts - bass trombone
- Bud Shank - flute, alto saxophone
- Art Pepper - alto saxophone
- Jimmy Guiffre - clarinet
- Bill Holman, Richie Kamuca, Bill Perkins - tenor saxophone
- Chuck Gentry - baritone saxophone
- Pete Jolly, Lou Levy - piano
- Joe Mondragon - bass
- Mel Lewis - drums
