= Cool and Crazy =

Studio album by Shorty Rogers and His Orchestra featuring the Giants
- Released: 1953
- Recorded: March 26 and April 2, 1953
- Studio: RCA Victor Studios, Hollywood, CA
- Genre: Jazz
- Length: 26:25
- Label: RCA Victor; LPM 3138
- Producer: Jack Lewis

Shorty Rogers chronology
Shorty Rogers and His Giants (1953)	Cool and Crazy (1953)	Shorty Rogers Courts the Count (1954)

Cool and Crazy is an album by American jazz trumpeter, composer and arranger Shorty Rogers originally released by RCA Victor in 1953 as a 10-inch LP.

== Reception ==
Professional ratings
Review scores
Source	Rating
Allmusic	4/5 stars

Allmusic noted "Rogers shows a deft hand throughout, managing to make his complex and varied material sound seamless and eminently swinging. ...A classic from the '50s big-band era".

== Track listing ==
All compositions by Shorty Rogers.

1. "Coop de Graas" - 2:58
2. "Infinity Promenade" - 3:36
3. "Short Stop" - 3:18
4. "Boar-Jibu" - 3:37
5. "Contours" - 3:21
6. "Tale of an African Lobster" - 3:26
7. "Chiquito Loco" - 3:28
8. "The Sweetheart of Sigmund Freud" - 2:41
- Recorded at RCA Studios in Hollywood, CA on March 26, 1953 (tracks 1–4) and April 2, 1953 (tracks 5–8)

== Personnel ==
- Shorty Rogers - trumpet, arranger
- Pete Candoli, Maynard Ferguson, Conrad Gozzo, John Howell - trumpet
- Milt Bernhart, Harry Betts, John Halliburton - trombone
- John Graas - French horn
- Gene Englund - tuba
- Art Pepper - alto saxophone, tenor saxophone, baritone saxophone
- Bud Shank - alto saxophone, baritone saxophone
- Bob Cooper, Jimmy Giuffre - tenor saxophone, baritone saxophone
- Marty Paich - piano
- Curtis Counce - bass
- Shelly Manne - drums
