= The New Continent =

Studio album by Dizzy Gillespie
- Released: 1965
- Recorded: September 1962
- Studio: United Recording Studios, Los Angeles, California
- Genre: Jazz
- Length: 76:39
- Label: Limelight LS/LM 86022

Dizzy Gillespie chronology
New Wave! (1962)	The New Continent (1965)	Something Old, Something New (1963)

Professional ratings
Review scores
Source	Rating
Allmusic	3/5 stars
Record Mirror	3/5 stars

The New Continent is an album by trumpeter Dizzy Gillespie's Big Band featuring performances arranged and composed by Lalo Schifrin and conducted by Benny Carter. It was produced by Quincy Jones in 1962 and released on the Limelight label.

== Release history ==
The CD reissue also included An Electrifying Evening with the Dizzy Gillespie Quintet (Verve, 1961).

== Track listing ==
All compositions by Lalo Schifrin except as indicated

1. "The Empire" - 5:48
2. "The Conquerors" - 7:32
3. "The Legend of Atlantis" - 7:43
4. "The Chains" - 9:10
5. "The Swords" - 4:06
6. "Chorale" - 5:48
7. "Kush" (Dizzy Gillespie) – 11:01 Bonus track on CD reissue
8. "Salt Peanuts" (Kenny Clarke, Gillespie) – 7:08 Bonus track on CD reissue
9. "A Night in Tunisia" (Gillespie, Frank Paparelli) – 6:46 Bonus track on CD reissue
10. "The Mooche" (Duke Ellington, Irving Mills) – 11:43 Bonus track on CD reissue
- Recorded at United Recording Studios in Los Angeles, California in September, 1962 (tracks 1–6) and at The Museum Of Modern Art in New York City on February 9, 1961 (tracks 7–10)

== Personnel ==
- Dizzy Gillespie - trumpet
- Conte Candoli, Al Porcino, Ray Triscari, Stu Williamson - trumpet (tracks 1–6)
- Mike Barone, Bob Edmonson, Frank Rosolino, Kenny Shroyer - trombone (tracks 1–6)
- Luis Kant, Stewart Rensey, Ches Thompson - French horn (tracks 1–6)
- Red Callender - tuba (tracks 1–6)
- Charlie Kennedy, Phil Woods - alto saxophone (tracks 1–6)
- Leo Wright - alto saxophone, flute (tracks 7–10)
- James Moody, Bill Perkins - tenor saxophone (tracks 1–6)
- Bill Hood - baritone saxophone (tracks 1–6)
- Lalo Schifrin - piano, arranger
- Al Hendrickson - guitar (tracks 1–6)
- Buddy Clark (tracks 1–6), Bob Cunningham (tracks 7–10), Chris White (tracks 1–6) - double bass
- Rudy Collins (tracks 1–6), Chuck Lampkin (tracks 7–10), Mel Lewis (tracks 1–6) - drums
- Candido Camero - conga (tracks 7–10)
- Francisco Aguabella, Larry Bunker, Emil Richards - percussion (tracks 1–6)
- Benny Carter - conductor (tracks 1–6)
