= Peter Gunn (album) =

Studio album by Ted Nash All Stars
- Released: 1959
- Recorded: 1959
- Studio: Radio Recorders, Los Angeles, California
- Genre: Jazz
- Length: 31:38
- Label: Crown; CLP 5101/CST 138
- Producer: Maxwell Davis

Ted Nash chronology
Star Eyes: The Artistry of Ted Nash (1957)	Peter Gunn (1959)

Peter Gunn is an album by saxophonist/conductor Ted Nash, led by Nash and arranged and produced by Maxwell Davis that was recorded in 1959 and released on the Crown label. The album is not Henry Mancini's popular score of the TV series Peter Gunn, which featured Nash playing "Dreamsville" on the original soundtrack, but a reinterpretation of the compositions issued to take advantage of the popularity of the series and theme.

== Reception ==
Professional ratings
Review scores
Source	Rating
AllMusic	4.5/5 stars

The AllMusic review by Stephan Cook noted it: "features some of the best Los Angeles session players of the time ... with brass-heavy, crime jazz tunes like "Fallout!" ... The bulk of the material, though, is in a cool, West Coast jazz vein ... Also included are the kind of sleepy-eyed lounge cuts Mancini excelled at, like "Dreamsville," "A Quiet Gass," and "Soft Sounds." This is an excellent collection and one that ranks with Mancini's other fine film and TV work from the '50s and '60s".

== Track listing ==
All compositions by Henry Mancini

1. "Peter Gunn" – 2:03
2. "Sorta Blue" – 2:54
3. "The Brothers Go to Mothers" – 2:42
4. "Dreamsville" – 3:38
5. "Soft Sounds" – 3:34
6. "Fallout !" – 3:10
7. "The Floater" – 3:15
8. "Session at Pete's Pad" – 3:47
9. "A Profound Gass" – 3:08
10. "Brief and Breezy" – 3:27

== Personnel ==
- Ted Nash – alto saxophone, flute, conductor
- Pete Candoli – trumpet (tracks 1, 2, 4, 5 & 8)
- Dick Nash – trombone (tracks 1–5 & 8)
- Ronnie Lang – baritone saxophone (tracks 1, 2, 4, 5 & 8)
- John T. Williams (tracks 1–5 & 8), Russ Freeman (tracks 6, 7, 9 & 10) – piano
- Larry Bunker – vibraphone
- Tony Rizzi – guitar (tracks 6, 7, 9 & 10)
- Cliff Hils (tracks 6, 7, 9 & 10), Rolly Bundock (tracks 1–5 & 8) – bass
- Alvin Stoller – drums
- Joe Triscari, Larry Sullivan, Uan Rasey – trumpet (tracks 1, 4, 5 & 8)
- David Wells, Jimmy Priddy, Karl de Karske – trombone (tracks 1, 4, 5 & 8)
- Art Maebe Jr., George Hyde, Jim Decker, Bill Hinshaw – French horn (tracks 1, 4, 5 & 8)
- Maxwell Davis – arranger
