= Thank Heaven for Little Girls =

Song by Maurice Chevalier

Song
- Written: Alan Jay Lerner; Frederick Loewe
- Released: 1957
- Genre: Jazz

"Thank Heaven for Little Girls" is a 1957 song written by Alan Jay Lerner and Frederick Loewe and associated with Maurice Chevalier, its original performer. It opened and closed the 1958 film Gigi. Alfred Drake performed the song in the 1973 Broadway stage production of Gigi, and in the 2015 revival, it was sung as a duet between Victoria Clark and Dee Hoty.

The Chevalier version is often regarded as the definitive version of the song; he recorded it in 1958. In 2004, it finished at #56 on AFI's 100 Years...100 Songs survey of top tunes in American cinema.

Bing Crosby recorded the song for his radio show in 1960 and it subsequently was released on the CD Songs I Wish I Had Sung the First Time Around... (2014). It has been performed by Rosemary Clooney, Perry Como, Gérard Depardieu, Merle Haggard, Hugh Hefner, The King Brothers, Ed McMahon, Andy Griffith, Chet Baker, Vera Lynn, Les Brown, and in his faux French accent, Peter Sellers. In the Happy Days season five episode "Be My Valentine" (1978), Scott Baio sang it as part of a series of musical numbers commemorating Valentine's Day. In the Punky Brewster season one episode "Miss Adorable" (1984), Andy Gibb performs it when introducing contestants of a beauty pageant. In the 1997 film Wag the Dog, the song performed by Chevalier is used as backdrop for an election campaign ad.

In the mid-1990s, a contemporary take on the song was recorded by the Seattle-based alternative band Ruby for a Mountain Dew commercial in the United States. This recording was later used by PepsiCo for its Pepsi Max brand in the United Kingdom.
