= Mike Barone =

- Born: Michael Barone; December 27, 1936 (age 88); Detroit, Michigan, U.S.
- Origin: Cleveland, Ohio, U.S.
- Genres: Jazz
- Instruments: Trombone https://mikebaronemusic.com/

Mike Barone (born December 27, 1936) is an American jazz trombonist, composer, arranger and big band leader. Mike was born in Detroit and raised in Cleveland. His brother, Gary Barone, was a trumpeter.

== Discography ==
=== As leader ===
- 1981 Blues & Other Happy Moments, Barone Brothers (Palo Alto Jazz)
- 1998 Live at Donte's 1968, Mike Barone Big Band (VSOP)
- 2005 Live 2005!, Mike Barone Big Band (Rhubarb)
- 2006 Metropole, Mike Barone Big Band (Rhubarb)

=== As sideman ===
- Dizzy Gillespie, The New Continent (Limelight, 1962)
- Shelly Manne, My Fair Lady with the Un-original Cast (Capitol, 1964)
- Pete Jolly, Pete Jolly and Friends (Äva, 1964)
- Oliver Nelson, Sound Pieces (Impulse!, 1966)
- Gerald Wilson Orchestra, The Golden Sword (Pacific Jazz, 1966)
- Johnny Hartman, I Love Everybody (ABC, 1967)
- Harvey Mandel, Righteous (Philips, 1969)
- Supersax, Supersax Plays Bird (Capitol, 1973)
- Keith Carradine, I'm Easy (Asylum, 1976)
