= Ralph Pena (musician) =

American jazz musician (1927–69)

- Born: February 24, 1927; Jarbidge, Nevada
- Died: May 20, 1969 (aged 42) Mexico City, Mexico
- Genres: Jazz
- Occupation: Musician
- Instruments: Bass; baritone horn; tuba
- Years active: 1942–1969

Ralph Raymond Pena (February 24, 1927 – May 20, 1969) was an American jazz double bassist and composer.

== Biography ==
Pena learned to play baritone horn and tuba as a child before becoming known as a jazz double bassist. He began his professional career in 1942 with Jerry Austin.

In the early 1950s he worked with Charlie Barnet, Stan Getz, Barney Kessel, Billy May, Jack Montrose, Vido Musso, Art Pepper, Duane Tatro, and Cal Tjader. He recorded with Shorty Rogers from 1955 to 1958, appearing with Rogers in the 1955 film The Man with the Golden Arm and also played with Jimmy Giuffre in 1955 and 1956 and Buddy DeFranco in the late 1950s. He played in a duo with Pete Jolly from 1958 to 1962 and occasionally recorded with Jolly, Giuffre, and Rogers together. In the early 1960s he worked with Ben Webster, Frank Sinatra, George Shearing, Joe Pass, Bud Shank, Dick Grove, Anita O'Day, Ella Fitzgerald, and Nancy Wilson. Late in the 1960s he worked on film soundtracks.

== Death ==
In May 1969, three months past his 42nd birthday, while Pena was in Mexico City, working on a film score, he was crossing the street and suffered fatal injuries upon being struck by an automobile.
