= Shorty Rogers =

American jazz trumpeter (1924–1994)

Background information
- Born: Milton Rajonsky; April 14, 1924; Great Barrington, Massachusetts, U.S.
- Died: November 7, 1994 (aged 70) Van Nuys, California, U.S.
- Genres: Jazz; cool jazz
- Occupations: Musician; composer; arranger
- Instruments: Trumpet; flugelhorn
- Years active: 1944–1994
- Labels: RCA Victor; Atlantic; Reprise

Milton "Shorty" Rogers (born Milton Rajonsky; April 14, 1924 – November 7, 1994) was an American jazz musician, one of the principal creators of West Coast jazz. He played trumpet and flugelhorn and was in demand for his skills as an arranger.

== Biography ==
Rogers was born as Milton Rajonsky in Great Barrington, Massachusetts, United States. He worked first as a professional musician with Will Bradley and Red Norvo. From 1947 to 1949, he worked extensively with Woody Herman and in 1950 and 1951 he played with Stan Kenton.

On June 7, 1953, Rogers and his orchestra, including Johnny "Guitar" Watson, performed for the famed ninth Cavalcade of Jazz concert at Wrigley Field in Los Angeles, produced by Leon Hefflin, Sr. Also featured that day were Roy Brown and his Orchestra, Don Tosti and His Mexican Jazzmen, Earl Bostic, Nat "King" Cole, and Louis Armstrong and his All Stars with Velma Middleton.

From 1953 through 1962, Rogers recorded a series of albums for RCA Victor (later reissued on RCA's Bluebird label) including Shorty Courts the Count (Shorty Rogers and His Orchestra, 1954), as well as a series of albums for Atlantic Records with his own group, Shorty Rogers and His Giants, including The Swinging Mr. Rogers (1955), and Martians Come Back (1955), the album title alluding to the tune "Martians Go Home" which Rogers had composed and performed on The Swinging Mr. Rogers earlier the same year. These albums incorporated some of his more avant-garde music. To some extent they could be classified as "cool" jazz; but they also looked back to the "hot" style of Count Basie, whom Rogers always credited as a major inspiration. In 1957, Rogers composed the music for the Friz Freleng cartoon Three Little Bops, notably the first Warner Bros. cartoon short in decades not to have music by either Carl W. Stalling or Milt Franklyn, and scored the music for the MGM film Tarzan, the Ape Man two years later. His other film work included the scores to Fools (1970), The Teacher (1974), The Specialist (1975), Dr. Minx (1975) and The Return of the Mod Squad (1979).

Rogers died of melanoma on November 7, 1994, in Van Nuys, California, at the age of 70.

== Discography ==
=== As leader ===
- Modern Sounds (Capitol, 1951 [1955])
- Popo (Xanadu, 1951 [1980])
- Shorty Rogers and His Giants (RCA Victor, 1953)
- Cool and Crazy (RCA Victor, 1953)
- The Wild One [4-song 45 rpm 7-inch vinyl EP] (RCA Victor EPA-535, 1953)
- Shorty Rogers Courts the Count (RCA Victor, 1954)
- Bud Shank – Shorty Rogers – Bill Perkins (Pacific Jazz, 1955)
- Collaboration (RCA Victor, 1955)
- The Swinging Mr. Rogers (Atlantic, 1955)
- Martians Stay Home (Atlantic, 1955 [1980])
- Martians Come Back! (Atlantic, 1955)
- Way Up There (Atlantic, 1955 [1957])
- Clickin' with Clax (Atlantic, 1956 [1978])
- Wherever the Five Winds Blow (RCA Victor, 1956)
- The Big Shorty Rogers Express (RCA Victor, 1956) – reissue of Cool And Crazy with 4 tracks added on
- Shorty Rogers Plays Richard Rodgers (RCA Victor, 1957)
- Portrait of Shorty (RCA Victor, 1957)
- Gigi in Jazz (RCA Victor, 1958)
- Afro-Cuban Influence (RCA Victor, 1958)
- Chances Are It Swings (RCA Victor, 1958)
- The Wizard of Oz and Other Harold Arlen Songs (RCA Victor, 1959)
- Shorty Rogers Meets Tarzan (MGM, 1960)
- The Swingin' Nutcracker (RCA Victor, 1960)
- An Invisible Orchard (RCA Victor, 1961 [1997])
- The Fourth Dimension in Sound (Warner Bros., 1962)
- Bossa Nova (Reprise, 1962)
- Jazz Waltz (Reprise, 1962)
- Mavis Meets Shorty (Reprise, 1962)
- Gospel Mission (Capitol, 1963)
- Re-Entry (Atlas, 1983)
- Yesterday, Today and Forever (Concord Jazz, 1983)
- Back Again (Choice, 1984)
- California Concert (Contemporary, 1985)
- America the Beautiful (Candid, 1991)
- Eight Brothers (Candid, 1992)

=== As sideman ===
With Elmer Bernstein

- The Man with the Golden Arm (Decca, 1956)

With Teddy Charles

- Collaboration West (Prestige, 1953)
- Evolution (Prestige, 1957)

With Jimmy Giuffre

- Jimmy Giuffre (Capitol, 1955)
- The Jimmy Giuffre Clarinet (Atlantic, 1956)

With Stan Kenton

- Innovations in Modern Music (Capitol, 1950)
- Stan Kenton Presents (Capitol, 1950)
- Popular Favorites by Stan Kenton (Capitol, 1953)
- The Kenton Era (Capitol, 1940–1954 [1955])
- The Innovations Orchestra (Capitol, 1950–1951 [1997])

With Eartha Kitt

- St. Louis Blues (RCA Victor, 1958)

With Perez Prado

- Voodoo Suite (RCA Victor, 1955)

With Pete Rugolo

- Introducing Pete Rugolo (Columbia, 1954)
- Adventures in Rhythm (Columbia, 1954)
- Rugolomania (Columbia, 1955)
- New Sounds by Pete Rugolo (Harmony, 1954–1955 [1957])

=== As arranger ===
With Herb Alpert & the Tijuana Brass

- Christmas Album (A&M, 1968)
- Warm (A&M, 1969)

With Ernie Andrews

- Soul Proprietor (Dot, 1968)

With Chet Baker

- Chet Baker & Strings (Columbia, 1954)

With Elmer Bernstein

- Baby the Rain Must Fall (Mainstream, 1965)

With Les Brown and His Band of Renown

- The Young Beat (Capitol, 1963)

With Bobby Bryant

- The Jazz Excursion Into "Hair" (Pacific Jazz, 1969)

With Bobby Darin

- You're the Reason I'm Living (Capitol, 1963)
- Bobby Darin Sings The Shadow of Your Smile (Atlantic, 1966)

With Frances Faye

- You Gotta Go! Go! Go! (Regina, 1964)

With Bobbie Gentry

- Ode to Billie Joe (Capitol, 1967)
- Local Gentry (Capitol, 1968)
- The Delta Sweete (Capitol, 1968)

With Terry Gibbs

- Reza (Dot, 1966)

With Jerry Goldsmith

- Stagecoach (Mainstream, 1966)

With Vince Guaraldi

- Alma-Ville (Warner Bros.-Seven Arts, 1969)

With Lena Horne

- Lena Like Latin (CRC Charter, 1963)

With Helen Humes

- Midsummer Night's Songs (RCA, 1974) with Red Norvo and His Orchestra

With Dean Jones

- Introducing Dean Jones (Valiant, 1963)

with Frankie Laine

- You Gave Me a Mountain (ABC, 1969)

With Peggy Lee

- In Love Again! (Capitol, 1964)
- Pass Me By (Capitol, 1965)

With Harvey Mandel

- Righteous (Philips, 1969)
- Baby Batter (Janus, 1971)

With Shelly Manne

- The West Coast Sound (Contemporary, 1955)
- My Son the Jazz Drummer! (Contemporary, 1962)

With Carmen McRae

- The Sound of Silence (Atlantic, 1968)
- Portrait of Carmen (Atlantic, 1968)

With The Monkees

- "Daydream Believer"/"Goin' Down" (Colgems, 1967)
- "D. W. Washburn"/"It's Nice to Be with You" (Colgems, 1968)
- The Birds, The Bees & The Monkees (Colgems, 1968)
- The Monkees Present (Colgems, 1969)

With Michael Nesmith

- The Wichita Train Whistle Sings (Dot, 1968)

With Jack Nitzsche

- Heart Beat (Soundtrack) (Capitol, 1980)

With Buddy Rich

- Big Swing Face, Pacific Jazz, 1967)
- Buddy & Soul (World Pacific, 1969)

With Bud Shank

- A Spoonful of Jazz (World Pacific, 1967)

With Mel Tormé

- Comin' Home Baby! (Atlantic, 1962)

== See also ==
- List of jazz arrangers
