= Bill Holman (musician) =

American composer, conductor and saxophonist (1927–2024)

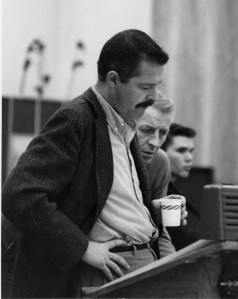
- Holman with Stan Kenton in 1961

Background information
- Born: Willis Leonard Holman; May 21, 1927; Olive, California, U.S.
- Died: May 6, 2024 (aged 96) Los Angeles, California, U.S.
- Genres: Traditional pop, jazz, big band
- Occupations: Composer, orchestrator, arranger, bandleader
- Instrument: Saxophone
- Years active: 1951–2024
- Labels: Capitol, Coral, Andex, HiFi, JVC
- Spouse: Jeri Southern (divorced)
- Military service
- Allegiance: United States
- Branch: United States Navy
- Service years: 1944–1946

Willis Leonard Holman (May 21, 1927 – May 6, 2024) was an American composer, arranger, conductor, saxophonist, and songwriter working in jazz and traditional pop. His career spanned over seven decades, starting with the Charlie Barnet orchestra in 1950.

== Early life ==
Bill Holman was born in Olive, California, United States on May 21, 1927. His family moved to Orange, east of Anaheim, then Santa Ana. He started playing the clarinet in junior high school. While attending Orange High School he played the tenor saxophone and formed a band. Although his family had no musical background, Holman was influenced by Count Basie and Duke Ellington while constantly listening to the radio. He was drafted at the later end of World War II and served in the U.S. Navy from 1944 to 1946. Through the Navy, he studied mechanical engineering at the University of Colorado and then studied at UCLA.

In the late 1940s, he started to concentrate on music instead of engineering. He enrolled at the Westlake College of Music, and studied with Dave Robertson and Alfred Sendrey. He studied privately with composer and arranger Russ Garcia and Lloyd Reese on the saxophone. He was influenced by the African-American jazz musicians on Central Avenue in Los Angeles. He heard live music while living nearby and attending Westlake College. He got his first professional start with Ike Carpenter's dance band, and then with the Charlie Barnet Orchestra in 1950 as a tenor saxophonist. He continued with that band for about three years. Early commercial work as an arranger came in 1951–52 when he wrote charts for band leader and producer Bob Keane for the album, Dancing on the Ceiling.

== The Stan Kenton Orchestra ==
Through his acquaintance with Gene Roland, Holman was auditioned by Stan Kenton and hired as a tenor saxophone player for two years in March 1952 (replacing Bob Cooper). After working with the band as an instrumentalist, Holman submitted writing to Kenton for the group. His first writing was not an immediate success with Kenton, until he was given an assignment to write "Invention for Guitar and Trumpet" for Sal Salvador and Maynard Ferguson. The chart was to become one of the recognized works for the Kenton orchestra from the album New Concepts of Artistry in Rhythm. It was used in the 1955 movie, Blackboard Jungle.

Kenton was attracted to Holman's ability to integrate counterpoint and dissonance in subtle yet distinctive ways, and for his knack for making the Kenton band "swing". Holman became one of Kenton's primary arrangers, creating a signature for the band. His association with the Kenton orchestra lasted nearly 27 years; he contributed to Kenton's albums New Concepts of Artistry in Rhythm, Contemporary Concepts and the Grammy Award-winning Adventures in Jazz. Kenton featured Holman as a composer and arranger with Bill Russo on the 1954 album Kenton Showcase.

In the course of some intense hanging out (with Gene Roland), I had played a recording of a 12-tone blues that I'd written (doesn't everybody?) while studying at the Westlake College of Music in Hollywood. According to Gene Roland, who had been writing for Kenton for some time, Stan had been talking about a more contrapuntal, linear type of music, and Gene felt that my piece lay in the direction that Stan was considering. While I was away on a short trip with Charlie Barnet, Gene took the recording to Kenton, and when I returned, Stan called. We met, talked, and he asked me to write a couple of pieces for the band. Being young and ambitious, I reached too far in the writing and exceeded my limits - the charts were disasters and never heard of again - but Stan gamely suggested that I do another. By this time I'd heard some of the things that Gerry Mulligan was bringing in, and with a slightly better idea of what was going on, managed to come back down to earth and brought in a better effort, though it, too, was never heard of again.

Holman's comments about being most influenced by the writing of Gerry Mulligan as the template for what was correct for the band:

Gerry wrote eight to ten scores for the band (early 1952, just before he formed the famous quartet) and, while Young Blood, the most linear of these, was the only one to really thrill Stan, the players (by this time I was playing tenor in the band) loved to play and hear all of them. For me particularly, being only about ten charts out of music school and with no real jazz conception of my own, Gerry's music played a great part in my finding my own voice.

Classical influences from Béla Bartók were also used during this time. Two of the most important arrangements are on the Kenton album, Contemporary Concepts (1955). Holman talked about his arrangements of "What's New?" and "I've Got You Under My Skin":

The idea for these two tunes was to write long charts, based on standard tunes, but to make them like an original piece. Just use the changes or a (melodic) fragment to tie it together; in other words, make them like an original – although you don't get royalties for it! But they were double the length of the usual chart. You could stretch out and do what you want. I remember the day we were all in New York, as part of the '54 All Star Concert Tour with the Kenton guys plus Shorty Rogers and his Quintet. They were going to continue on but I was going to stay there. I remember Shorty, Jack Montrose and I were walking down 48th Street where all the music stores were. We started looking through some scores and I found Bartok's Third and Fourth Quartets. I remember after the band left and I finally got down to writing these charts I was looking through the Bartok things and I got an idea for "What's New". Sometimes looking at something like that can give you an idea – not necessarily something that's specifically in there – but just puts something you can use into your head. Just an approach. Stan said to make 'em long and not worry bout keeping the melody going all the time. The standard changes are there so you can follow them if you're used to listening to jazz that way.

Zoot Sims joined the group as the solo tenor saxophonist; Kenton asked Holman to write for Sims. Later Holman left the band after an intense discussion about the band's shortcomings; this did not endanger Holman's reputation as a composer and arranger for Kenton. By the mid-1950s, while Holman was in his late 20s, Kenton was commissioning Holman to write as much as he could. He was writing sometimes two charts every week that included concert works, dance charts, originals, and vocals. During the 1952-55 period the two primary composers/arrangers who shaped the signature sound of the Kenton orchestra for years to come, were Holman and Bill Russo (who was a year younger than Holman). Almost two-thirds of the music recorded by Kenton during this period were from these two writers. Two of the original works of Holman's created for the band during that time include "Hav-a-Havana". The other work which has become the quintessential "Holman signature sound" of contrapuntal composition is "The Opener". Though Kenton's taste would evolve and Holman was not functioning as chief arranger by the end of the 1950s, he continued to make key contributions to the Kenton repertoire to 1977 before Kenton's demise in 1979.

"In sum, it was a pretty high level for an 'earn-as-you-learn' case such as mine, but, ill-equipped as I was, Stan's patience and encouragement and the help of a lot of great players enabled me to make a start in a long and rewarding career. I'll always be grateful (to Stan) for this, but, what the hell, we both got something out of it." Holman also become a participant and clinician of the Stan Kenton Band Clinics as an educational component of the orchestra.

== Big band writing ==
Holman wrote for other big bands. Examples of Holman's work for Woody Herman are "Mulligan Tawny" and "Blame Boehm" that were recorded for Columbia in 1954. Probably the most well known arrangement for the Herman band is Holman's up tempo chart on "After You've Gone" from the Grammy nominated album Woody Herman '64. The band used three tenor saxes and a baritone sax (no alto saxes). The association and the writing for the Woody Herman continued off and on up through the 1980s; this included four Grammy nominated albums Holman's work is recorded on.

In 1965, drummer Buddy Rich started a touring big band. Rich's familiarity with Holman's writing came through playing on Harry James' group from earlier in the decade. Holman was one of the first writers to write for Rich's big band book; Rich was looking for updated material of contemporary pop hits that also featured himself (Rich) on drums. Holman became the primary 'go to' composer and arranger helping to create an appeal Rich was to have with much younger audiences at a time, when big bands had fallen out of fashion. Drum features and pop/rock tunes Holman wrote greatly helped Rich to achieve a new sound, that aided the band to gain a younger listening audience. Holman's writing is featured on several Buddy Rich big band albums from 1966 through 1985 to include Grammy nominated LPs Big Swing Face and Buddy & Soul. Holman's arrangement of the Beatles "Norwegian Wood" was a commercial success, and prominently featured on numerous live television performances, creating a high profile early on for Rich's band. His composition "Ruth" is a good example of contemporary big band writing during that time of the late 1960s.

One of the most notable jazz albums Holman wrote was I Told You So, commissioned by the Count Basie Orchestra and recorded at RCA studios, New York City in January 1976 (for Norman Granz and Pablo Records). Other important groups and big bands he has written and recorded for include names such as Louie Bellson, Maynard Ferguson, Gerry Mulligan's Concert Jazz Band, Harry James, Terry Gibbs, The Airmen of Note and Chicago Jazz Orchestra.

== West Coast work ==
Holman became an important figure in what was to become the West Coast jazz scene, starting in the 1950s. Through Holman's associations to personnel from Central Avenue, Stan Kenton, and Woody Herman he assembled small jazz groups and participated in those of others. These include Carmen McRae, Bob Cooper, Shorty Rogers, Sarah Vaughan, Ella Fitzgerald, The Tonight Show Band, Manhattan Transfer, Diane Schuur, J.J. Johnson, Jack Sheldon, Charlie Shoemake, Howard Roberts, Ann Richards, Anita O'Day, Lighthouse All-Stars, June Christy, Mel Torme, Chet Baker, Art Pepper, Lennie Niehaus, Conte Candoli, Dave Pell, Shelly Manne and Terry Gibbs. He recorded for several labels and performed often at The Lighthouse, Basin Street West, and Donte's.

Holman worked with The Wrecking Crew, The 5th Dimension, The Association, The Sandpipers, and The Monkees. Each of these four pop groups had award-winning hits and platinum selling records containing Holman's work as an arranger. This roster includes Burt Bacharach, Pearl Bailey, Tony Bennett, Les Brown, Michael Bublé, Bobby Darin, Johnny Desmond, The Four Freshmen, Jackie & Roy, Eartha Kitt, Mario Lanza, Steve Lawrence, Peggy Lee, Seals & Crofts, Bobby Sherman, Tak Shindo, The Turtles, Randy VanWarmer and Si Zentner.

Holman's television credits include Academy Awards, Tonight Show Starring Johnny Carson, The Dick Cavett Show, The Bing Crosby Show, The Mike Douglas Show, The Merv Griffin Show, The Hollywood Palace, The Ed Sullivan Show. He wrote film scores for Swamp Women (1956), Get Out of Town (1959), and Three on a Couch (1966), Glengarry Glen Ross, The Wrecking Crew, Luv, Harper, The Marrying Man and Sharky's Machine.

== Bill Holman Big Band ==
He formed a big band in the 1950s which recorded several albums in the late 1950s and early 1960s. These albums included In a Jazz Orbit (1958), The Fabulous Bill Holman (1958) and Bill Holman's Great Big Band (1961). The group also recorded several albums under Holman's name backing Jackie & Roy, Mark Murphy and David Allen. The most notable album of these was with singer Anita O'Day in 1960/61 entitled Incomparable! for Verve Records. By the late 1960s Holman had de-emphasized the group due to his busy schedule, the commercial viability of a big band, and partly because of the departure of drummer Mel Lewis moving back to New York City.

Starting in 1975, nearly 13 years after his last big band recording, Holman began rehearsing, writing and recording with his own big band again, which were winners of two Grammys. His first recording with the new group in 1988 was Bill Holman Band: World Class Music (JVC). Pulling in Los Angeles studio musicians who admired and appreciated his work, Holman was able to release a list of acclaimed CDs, including Brilliant Corners, which featured arrangements of tunes written by Thelonious Monk, that won a Grammy in 1997. Holman's band is one of the few regularly rehearsing big bands that meets on a weekly basis. The group featured at numerous jazz venues and festivals over the last 30 years, that included The Jazz Bakery, the Reno Jazz Festival, Elmhurst Jazz festival, Monterey Jazz Festival and many times at the Los Angeles Jazz Institute's Big Band Bash that happens every May.

== Work with European musicians ==
Holman's writing for large jazz ensemble had a tremendous impact outside of the United States. He conducted and recorded with well-known jazz orchestras such as the WDR Big Band in Cologne, the BBC Big Band in London, SWR Big Band in Stuttgart, Germany, the hr-Bigband in Frankfurt, Germany, RIAS Big Band Berlin, the Klaus Weiss Big Band, Vic Lewis, the Norwegian Radio Big Band, BuJazzO, and the Netherlands Metropole Orchestra in Amsterdam. Musical scores and recording for Bill Holman are archived in over 20 major countries' national libraries around the world.

== Awards and honors ==
Holman was the arranger and orchestrator on numerous albums that garnered Grammy nominations; he personally had 16 nominations in total and won three times. Holman's first nomination came in 1960 for Best Arrangement for Peggy Lee's hit single "I'm Gonna Go Fishin' ". He was the main contributor as an arranger (three tracks) to the 1963 Best Jazz Performance - Large Group (Instrumental) category winning Stan Kenton album Adventures In Jazz. Holman was a contributing arranger for the 1970 Grammy Record of the Year, The Age of Aquarius by The 5th Dimension. His first Grammy Award win came in 1988 for Best Instrumental Arrangement (with Doc Severinsen and the Tonight Show Orchestra).

He was an important contributing orchestrator/arranger of Natalie Cole's 1992 multiple Grammy winning album Unforgettable... with Love, and her follow up Grammy winning CD's Take a Look and Still Unforgettable. In 1996, Holman received his second Grammy Award for Best Instrumental Composition, "A View from the Side", recorded by his Bill Holman Band on the JVC label. His third Grammy came in 1997, for the recording Brilliant Corners/The Music of Thelonious Monk, it won the Grammy Award in 1998 for Best Instrumental Arrangement for Holman's arrangement of "Straight, No Chaser". He was repeatedly selected as one of the leading names in the DownBeat magazine poll for "Jazz Arranger/Orchestrator".

In May 2000, the Bill Holman Collection of scores and memorabilia was established at the Smithsonian Institution in Washington, D.C. On January 12, 2010, the National Endowment for the Arts bestowed the 2010 NEA Jazz Masters Award on Bill Holman, the nation's highest honor for jazz and American Music. Holman was a recipient of the American Society of Music Arrangers and Composers Golden Score Award in 2008. He later received an honorary doctorate from Elmhurst College in Illinois.

=== Grammy Awards ===
Year	Nominee / work	Award	Result
1960	"I'm Gonna Go Fishin'", arranged by Holman	Best Arrangement	Nominated
1967	"Norwegian Wood (This Bird Has Flown)", arranged by Holman - instrumental	Best Arrangement	Nominated
1967	"Windy", arranged by Holman - instrumental for backing vocal	Best Arrangement	Nominated
1969	"Aquarius/Let the Sunshine In", arranged by Holman	Best Arrangement for Vocalist(s) or Instrumental(s)	Nominated
1973	"The Daily Dance", composed by Holman	Best Instrumental Arrangement	Nominated
1987	"Take the "A" Train", arranged by Holman	Best Arrangement on an Instrumental	Won
1988	Bill Holman Band	Best Jazz Instrumental Performance, Big Band	Nominated
1996	"A View from the Side", composed by Holman	Best Instrumental Composition	Won
1996	A View from the Side	Best Large Jazz Ensemble Performance	Nominated
1998	"Brilliant Corners"	Best Large Jazz Ensemble Performance	Nominated
1998	"Straight, No Chaser", arranged by Holman	Best Instrumental Arrangement	Won
1999	"The Moon of Manakoora", arranged by Holman	Best Instrumental Arrangement	Nominated
1999	Further Adventures	Best Large Jazz Ensemble Performance	Nominated
2005	Bill Holman Band: Live	Best Large Jazz Ensemble Album	Nominated
2007	Hommage	Best Large Jazz Ensemble Album	Nominated
2012	"Without a Paddle", composed by Holman	Best Instrumental Composition	Nominated

Grammy Award-winning singles or albums contributed to as composer or arranger

Year	Grammy category (*won)	Album or single	Primary artist	Label	Role as composer or arranger	Content composed or arranged
1963	*Best Jazz Performance – Large Group (Instrumental)	Adventures in Jazz	Stan Kenton	Capitol	arranger	"Limehouse Blues" "Stairway to the Stars" "Malagueña"
1969	*Record of the Year	"Aquarius/Let the Sunshine In"	The 5th Dimension	Soul City	arranger (for instrumental background)	"Aquarius/Let the Sunshine In"
1992	*Album of the Year	Unforgettable... with Love	Natalie Cole	Elektra	arranger (for big band)	"Avalon" "Almost Like Being in Love" "Thou Swell " "L-O-V-E" "Don't Get Around Much Anymore" "This Can't Be Love"
1994	*Best Jazz Vocal Album	Take a Look	Natalie Cole	Elektra	arranger (for big band)	"Swingin' Shepherd Blues" "Undecided" "All About Love"
1996	*Best Traditional Pop Vocal Performance	Here's to the Ladies	Tony Bennett	Columbia	arranger (for big band)	"People" "Over the Rainbow" "Down in the Depths" "Tangerine"
2008	*Best Traditional Pop Vocal Album	Call Me Irresponsible	Michael Bublé	Reprise	arranger (for big band)	"Call Me Irresponsible"
2011	*Best Traditional Pop Vocal Album	Crazy Love	Michael Bublé	Reprise	orchestrator	"All I Do Is Dream of You"

Grammy Award nominated singles or albums contributed to as composer or arranger

Year	Grammy category (*nominated)	Album or single	Primary artist	Label	Role as composer or arranger	Content composed or arranged
1961	*Best Solo Vocal Performance - Female	Basin Street East Proudly Presents Miss Peggy Lee	Peggy Lee	Capitol	composer and arranger	*Bows music* Other arrangements
1964	*Best Instrumental Jazz Performance - Large Group or Soloist with Large Group	Woody Herman '64	Woody Herman	Philips	composer and arranger	"After You've Gone" "Jazz Hoot"
1967	*Best Instrumental Jazz Performance - Large Group or Soloist with Large Group	Woody Live–East and West	Woody Herman	Columbia	composer	"Waltz for a Hung-Up Ballet Mistress"
1967	*Best Instrumental Jazz Performance - Large Group or Soloist with Large Group	Big Swing Face	Buddy Rich	Pacific	arranger	"Norwegian Wood" "Monitor Theme" "Wack Wack"
1968	*Best Instrumental Jazz Performance - Large Group or Soloist with Large Group	Concerto for Herd: Live at the Monterey Jazz Festival 1981	Woody Herman	Verve	composer	"Concerto for Herd" "The Horn of the Fish"
1969	*Best Instrumental Jazz Performance - Large Group or Soloist with Large Group	Buddy & Soul	Buddy Rich	Pacific	arranger	"Ruth" "Hello, I Love You"
1969	*Album of the Year	The Age of Aquarius	The 5th Dimension	Soul City	arranger	*whole album
1982	*Best Instrumental Performance – Big Band	Live at the Concord Jazz Festival 1981	Woody Herman	Concord	composer	"Midnight Run"
1985	*Best Instrumental Performance – Big Band	Don't Stop Now!	Louis Bellson	Bosco	arranger	"Lover Man"
1991	*Best Traditional Pop Performance	Pure Schuur	Diane Schuur	GRP	arranger	"Deed I Do"
2002	*Best Large Ensemble Jazz Album	Can I Persuade You?	Vanguard Jazz Orchestra	Planet Arts	arranger	"Just Friends"
2009	*Best Traditional Pop Album	A Swingin' Christmas	Tony Bennett	Columbia	arranger	"I'll Be Home for Christmas" "My Favourite Things" "Winter Wonderland" "Santa Claus Is Coming To Town"

Academy Award nominated songs or soundtracks contributed to as composer or arranger

Year	Academy Award category (*nominated)	song or soundtrack	Film	Performing artist	Role as composer or arranger
1970	*Best Original Song	"Come Saturday Morning"	The Sterile Cuckoo	The Sandpipers	arranger

== Discography ==
=== As leader ===
- Bill Holman (Capitol, 1954) Stan Kenton Presents Series
- West Coast Jazz in Hi-Fi with Richie Kamuca (HiFi, 1957) reissued as "Jazz Erotica"
- The Fabulous Bill Holman (Coral, 1958)
- In a Jazz Orbit (Andex, 1958)
- Jive for Five with Mel Lewis (Andex, 1959)
- Bill Holman's Great Big Band (Capitol, 1960)
- The Bill Holman Band (JVC, 1987)
- Live at the Royal Palms Inn Vol. 7 with Conte Candoli (Woofy, 1994)
- A View from the Side (JVC, 1995)
- Brilliant Corners: The Music of Thelonious Monk (JVC, 1997)
- Further Adventures with Netherlands Metropole Orchestra (Koch Jazz, 1998)

=== As sideman ===
With Terry Gibbs

- Launching a New Band (Mercury, 1959)
- More Vibes On Velvet (Mercury, 1959)
- Dream Band (Contemporary, 1986)
- One More Time Vol. 6 (Contemporary, 2002)

With Shorty Rogers

- Shorty Rogers Courts the Count (RCA Victor, 1954)
- The Big Shorty Rogers Express (RCA Victor, 1956)
- Shorty Rogers Plays Richard Rodgers (RCA Victor, 1957)
- Gigi in Jazz (RCA 1958)
- Manteca (RCA Victor, 1958)
- Portrait of Shorty (RCA Victor, 1958)
- Shorty Rogers Meets Tarzan (MGM, 1959)
- Chances Are It Swings (RCA Victor, 1959)
- The Wizard of Oz and Other Harold Arlen Songs (RCA Victor, 1959)
- The Swingin' Nutcracker (RCA Victor, 1960)
- Clickin' with Clax (Atlantic, 1978)

With others

- Manny Albam, The Jazz Greats of Our Time Vol. 2 (Coral, 1958)
- Chet Baker & Bud Shank, Theme Music from "The James Dean Story" (World Pacific, 1957)
- Elmer Bernstein, The Man with the Golden Arm (Decca, 1956)
- Buddy Bregman, Swingin' Standards (World Pacific, 1959)
- Ray Brown, Bass Hit! (Verve, 1957)
- Conte Candoli, Conte Candoli (Bethlehem, 1955)
- Conte Candoli, West Coast Wailers (Atlantic, 1955)
- Peggy Connelly, Peggy Connelly (Bethlehem, 1956)
- Maynard Ferguson, Around the Horn with Maynard Ferguson (Emarcy, 1956)
- Maynard Ferguson, Stratospheric (Mercury, 1976)
- Ella Fitzgerald, Ella Swings Lightly (Verve, 1958)
- Med Flory, Jazz Wave (Jubilee, 1958)
- Stan Kenton, New Concepts of Artistry in Rhythm (Capitol, 1953)
- Bob Keene, Dancing On the Ceiling (Whippet, 1957)
- Mel Lewis, Mel Lewis Sextet (Mode, 1957)
- Johnny Mandel, I Want to Live (United Artists, 1958)
- Shelly Manne, The West Coast Sound (Contemporary, 1956)
- Shelly Manne, Concerto for Clarinet & Combo (Contemporary, 1957)
- Mark Murphy, Mark Murphy's Hip Parade (Capitol, 1960)
- Mark Murphy, Playing the Field (Capitol, 1960)
- Lennie Niehaus, Vol. 3: The Octet No. 2 (Contemporary, 1955)
- Dave Pell, I Had the Craziest Dream (Capitol, 1957)
- Art Pepper, The Artistry of Pepper (Pacific Jazz, 1962)
- Art Pepper, Art Pepper Plays Shorty Rogers & Others (Pacific Jazz, 1978)
- Johnny Richards, Something Else by Johnny Richards (Bethlehem, 1956)
- Howard Roberts, Good Pickin's (Verve, 1959)
- Howard Roberts, The Movin' Man (VSP, 1966)
- Jimmy Rowles, Weather in a Jazz Vane (Andex, 1959)
- The Sandpipers, Come Saturday Morning (A&M, 1970)
- Mel Torme, George Gershwin's Porgy & Bess (Bethlehem, 1956)
- Cy Touff & Richie Kamuca & Harry Edison, Havin' a Ball (World Pacific, 1958)
- Bobby Troup, Bobby Troup and His Stars of Jazz (RCA Victor, 1959)
- Randy VanWarmer, The Vital Spark (Alias, 1994)
- Stu Williamson, Stu Williamson (Bethlehem, 1956)

=== As composer and arranger ===
With Count Basie

- I Told You So (Pablo, 1976)

With Gabe Baltazar

- Stan Kenton Presents Gabe Baltazar (Creative World, 1979)

With Charlie Barnet

- Cherokee (Everest, 1958)
- More (Everest, 1959)
- Big Band 1967 (Creative World, 1967)

With Louie Bellson

- The Louis Bellson Explosion (Pablo, 1975)
- Sunshine Swing (Pablo, 1978)
- Don't Stop Now (Bosco, 1984)
- The Art of the Chart (Concord, 1998)

With Tony Bennett

- Here's to the Ladies (Columbia, 1995)
- A Swingin' Christmas (Columbia, 2008)

With Michael Bublé

- Come Fly with Me (Reprise, 2004)
- It's Time (Reprise, 2005)
- Caught in the Act (Reprise, 2005)
- Crazy Love (Reprise, 2009)
- Special Delivery (Reprise, 2010)

With June Christy

- Big Band Specials (Capitol, 1962)

With Natalie Cole

- Unforgettable... with Love (Elektra, 1991)
- Take a Look (Elektra, 1993)
- Still Unforgettable (DMI/Atco, 2008)

With Maynard Ferguson

- Dimensions (EmArcy, 1955)
- Maynard Ferguson Octet (EmArcy, 1955)
- Around the Horn with Maynard Ferguson (EmArcy, 1956)
- Birdland Dream Band Volume 2 (Vik, 1956)
- Boy With Lots of Brass (EmArcy, 1957)
- Swingin' My Way Through College (Roulette, 1959)
- Come Blow Your Horn (Cameo, 1963)
- Trumpet Rhapsody (MPS, 1968)

With Jerry Fielding And His Orchestra

- Near East Brass (Command, 1967)

With Terry Gibbs

- Launching a New Band, aka Launching a New Sound in Music (Mercury, 1959)
- Dream Band (Contemporary, 1959)
- The Dream Band, Vol. 2: The Sundown Sessions (Contemporary, 1959)
- Dream Band, Vol. 3: Flying Home (Contemporary, 1959)
- Dream Band, Vol. 6: One More Time (Contemporary, 1959)
- Swing Is Here! (second original Dream Band release) (Verve, 1960)
- The Exciting Terry Gibbs Big Band (Verve, 1961) – reissued as Dream Band, Vol. 4: Main Stem
- Explosion! (Mercury, 1961) – reissued as Dream Band, Vol. 5: The Big Cat

With Benny Goodman

- Hello Benny! (Capitol, 1964)

With Woody Herman

- The 3 Herds (Columbia, 1954)
- Woody Herman:1964 (Philips, 1964)
- My Kind of Broadway (Columbia, 1965)
- The Jazz Swinger (Columbia, 1966)
- Concerto for Herd – At the Monterey Jazz Festival (Atlantic, 1968)
- Woody Herman Live at the Concord Jazz Festival (Concord, 1981)

With Jackie and Roy

- Bits and Pieces (ABC-Paramount, 1957)
- Free And Easy! (ABC-Paramount, 1958)

With Harry James

- The New James (Capitol, 1958)

With Bob Keane

- Dancing on the Ceiling (Whippet, 1952)

With Stan Kenton

- New Concepts of Artistry in Rhythm (Capitol, 1953)
- Kenton Showcase (Capitol, 1954)
- The Kenton Era (Capitol, 1955)
- Contemporary Concepts (Capitol, 1955)
- Back to Balboa (Capitol, 1958)
- Road Show (Capitol, 1960)
- Two Much! (Capitol, 1960)
- Adventures in Jazz (Capitol, 1962)
- Stan Kenton / Jean Turner (Capitol, 1963)
- Live at Redlands University (Creative World/GNP Crescendo, 1970)
- Live At Brigham Young University (Creative World/GNP Crescendo, 1971)
- Birthday in Britain (Creative World/GNP Crescendo, 1973)
- Kenton '76 (Creative World/GNP Crescendo, 1976)

With Peggy Lee

- Basin Street East Proudly Presents Miss Peggy Lee (Capitol, 1961)
- In Love Again! (Capitol, 1964)
- Big $pender (Capitol, 1966)
- Extra Special! (Capitol, 1967)
- 2 Shows Nightly (Capitol, 1968) - also 2009 compilation with unissued material

With Carmen McRae

- IN SESSION: SARAH & CARMEN (T.V Program, 1977)
- Blue Note Meets The L.A. Philharmonic (Blue Note, 1978)

With Gerry Mulligan

- The Gerry Mulligan Songbook (World Pacific, 1957)
- The Concert Jazz Band (Verve, 1960)
- The Concert Jazz Band At Newport (Solar, 1960)
- The Concert Jazz Band – December 1960 (Musidisc, 1960)
- Gerry Mulligan and the Concert Jazz Band – Zurich 1960 (TCB, 1960)
- Gerry Mulligan and the Concert Jazz Band – Olympia, 19 Novembre, 1960 (Europe 1, 1960)
- Gerry Mulligan and the Concert Jazz Band on Tour (Verve, 1960 [rel. 1962])

With Mark Murphy

- This Could Be The Start Of Something (Capitol, 1958)
- Mark Murphy's Hip Parade (Capitol, 1960)
- Playing the Field (Capitol, 1960)

With Anita O'Day

- Incomparable! (Verve, 1961)

With Art Pepper

- Winter Moon (Galaxy, 1980)

With Art Pepper and Conte Candoli

- Mucho Calor (Andex, 1957)

With Buddy Rich

- Swingin' New Big Band (Pacific Jazz, 1966)
- Big Swing Face (Pacific Jazz, 1967)
- The New One! (Pacific Jazz, 1968)
- Buddy & Soul (Pacific Jazz, 1969)
- Keep The Customer Satisfied (Pacific Jazz, 1970)
- Rich In London (Live At Ronnie Scott's) (RCA, 1971)
- Winning the West (United Artists, 1972)
- Mr. Drums (Mobile Fidelity, 1985)

With Ann Richards

- The Many Moods of Ann Richards (Capitol, 1960)
- Two Much! (Capitol, 1960) - with Stan Kenton

With Frank Rosolino

- Kenton Presents (Capitol, 1954)
- Kenton Presents: Frankly Speaking (Capitol, 1955)
- The Legend Of Frank Rosolino (Interlude, 1959)

With Diane Schuur

- Pure Schuur (GRP, 1991)

With Charlie Shoemake

- Collaboration (Pausa, 1985)
- Strollin' (Chase, 1991)

With Zoot Sims

- Hawthorne Nights (Pablo, 1977)

With The Tonight Show Band with Doc Severinsen

- The Tonight Show Band with Doc Severinsen (Amherst, 1986)
- The Tonight Show Band • Vol. II with Doc Severinsen (Amherst, 1987)
- Once More... With Feeling! (Amherst, 1991)

With Sarah Vaughan

- Sarah Vaughan Sings the Mancini Songbook (Mercury, 1965)

With Jiggs Whigham and the WDR Big Band

- The Third Stone (Koala, 1989)

With Si Zentner

- From Russia With Love (Liberty, 1964)
- Plays The Big Band-Hits (Liberty, 1964)

== Personal life and death ==
Holman's marriage to jazz singer and pianist Jeri Southern ended in divorce. They had one daughter. He died in Los Angeles on May 6, 2024, at the age of 96.

== See also ==
- List of jazz arrangers
- Stan Kenton
- West Coast jazz

== Bibliography ==
- Arganian, Lillian. Stan Kenton: the Man and his Music Artistry Press, 1989
- Clarke, Donald. The Penguin Encyclopedia of Popular Music Penguin Books, 1998
- Holman, Bill/Dobbins, Bill. Conversations With Bill Holman: Thoughts and Recollections of a Jazz Master. Advance Music, 2017, ISBN 3954810379
- Kernfeld, Barry Dean Kernfeld. The New Grove Dictionary of Jazz Macmillan, 2002
- Sparke, Michael. Stan Kenton: This Is an Orchestra. University of North Texas Press. 2010
