= Winter in Madrid (song) =

Song for jazz orchestra by Jacques Cascales and Gene Roland

Single by Stan Kenton with Ann Richards

from the album Ann, Mann!
- B-side: "Baa-Too-Kee"
- Published: August, 31 1955
- Released: 1956
- Recorded: 1955
- Genre: Jazz
- Length: 2:21
- Label: Capitol
- Songwriters: Jacques Cascales; Gene Roland

"Winter in Madrid" is a song for jazz orchestra written by Jacques Cascales (words) and Gene Roland (music and orchestration). It was copyrighted 31 August 1955 and published by Benton Publications, Inc., Hollywood, California. The music was first performed and recorded by Stan Kenton (with Ann Richards. It was also recorded and performed by Toots Thielemans, Ran Blake, Fats Waller and was used in the score for the 1960 French-Italian-Brazilian film Os Bandeirantes. Jacques Cascales a pseudonym for Johnny Richards, who was the brother of big band leader Chuck Cabot and the brother of bass player Jack Adolph Cascales (né Juan Adolph Cascales; 1918–1975).
