= Calo Scott =

Cuban-American jazz cellist (1920–1998)

- Born: March 11, 1920; Camaguey, Cuba
- Died: May 9, 1998 (aged 78) Middlesex, VT
- Genres: Jazz
- Instrument: Cello
- Years active: 1957-1974

Calo Scott (March 11, 1920 - August 9, 1998) was a Cuban-American jazz cellist. He is one of the earliest known jazz cellists. He established himself in the 1950s through working with the saxophonist Gerry Mulligan when "having a cello player as an improvising member of a jazz group was then virtually unheard of." Scott also worked with Ahmed Abdul-Malik, Gato Barbieri, Marc Levin, and John Handy. He was also active on Manhattan's Lower East Side intermedia-arts scene, working with artists such as dancer-choreographer Mary McKay, artist Aldo Tambellini, and filmmaker Cassandra Einstein (then known as Cassandra Gerstein).

== Early life and career ==
Calo Scott was born in Camaguey, Cuba, and moved to the US when he was two years old. He began studies on piano, chose to focus his studies on the saxophone in his teens, and started working as a professional musician with a US Army band in the 1949. In the early 1950s he was diagnosed with a rheumatic heart condition and subsequently switched to the cello. His peers and critics later commented that his early work with the saxophone heavily informed his signature phrasings on the cello.

He studied at the Third Street Settlement House, a community school founded in 1894 on the Lower East Side, which offered classes in contemporary music and dance.

He began working as a freelance musician in New York City in the mid-1950s, where he frequently performed at Five Spot, Dom, and Village Gate, as well as at Carnegie Hall. Between 1957 and 1974, he participated in 23 recording sessions. His most acclaimed recordings include his solos on the track "Don't Blame Me" on The Music of Ahmed Abdul-Malik, and his contributions to Gato Barbieri Quartet's In Search of the Mystery.

Scott was known for his unique habit of playing the cello while standing, which one can see in performance photos (such as those taken during Aldo Tambellini's "Black Zero"); portraits of the artist suggest that he supported the cello's weight with the assistance of a saxophone-neck strap.

Steve Lacy described Scott in an interview as "A very good cellist. He was a great cellist and he used to pluck the cello [pizzicato] like a bass. He sounded like Jimmy Blanton really. It was amazing. He died young. This was the first guy I ever heard playing the cello like that. It was for dancing."

Lorenzo Thomas said about Scott, "The day John Handy III came to town, he was featured on television. But if you were down you had a chance to meet him at the Dom on St. Marks Place, the truly happening place those days on the Lower East Side. Everyone was excited by the advance word; and, when it hit, the new LP from Columbia Records delivered a knockout punch. It was Sunday afternoon and in the Dom's cool, dark basement lounge Handy and cellist Calo Scott sat up on the bar and played some thoughtful, beautiful music. Intricate and soulful. These were artists with total mastery of their instruments… They stopped just in time for everybody in the place, a couple dozen folk, to help John watch himself on TV. It was a family affair."

Norris Jones, aka Sirone, said, "Calo was an incredible cellist. I did not know this until later but I heard that he had played saxophone and had some health problems—I don't know how true it is—and this is why he switched over to cello. But the concept of the way he would go with cello, it was like he was playing a horn. His phrasing was completely taken in a different direction from the cello. […] For two string players, we were very much accompanying one another. We were never in each other's way. And when we made the individual contribution, the contribution was made towards the whole."

Scott frequently collaborated with his partner, dancer-choreographer Mary McKay. He also collaborated with the performance artist Aldo Tambellini, including in two performances of Tambellini's performance "Moondial" in 1966 (at The Bridge Theater and at the University of Ontario, and in May 1967 (at the McCarter Theater). Scott also performed independently with Tambellini to create sound for "Black Zero" in 1968. Scott also collaborated with the filmmaker Cassandra Gerstein; he provided the soundtrack for her film Kali and was featured in the portrait film Undine.

== Later life ==
Around 1973, after suffering a stroke, Scott retired from performing and recording, and moved with his partner Mary McKay to Middlesex, Vermont, where they both lived out the rest of their lives.

== Discography ==
- 1957 Vinnie Burke's String Jazz Quartet (ABC-Paramount) – with Bobby Grillo, Dick Wetmore, Vinnie Burke
- 1958 The Gerry Mulligan Songbook (World Pacific)
- 1958 Mal/3: Sounds (Prestige)
- 1961 Ahmed Abdul-Malik – The Music of Ahmed Abdul-Malik (New Jazz)
- 1962 Ahmed Abdul-Malik – Sounds of Africa (New Jazz)
- 1967 Gato Barbieri Quartet – In Search of the Mystery (ESP Disk) — with Norris Jones, Bobby Kapp, Gato Barbieri
- 1968 Marc Levin – The Dragon Suite (Savoy Records) — with Cecil McBee, Frank Clayton, Marc Levin, and Jonas Gwangwa
- 1971 Archie Shepp – Things Have Got to Change (Impulse!)
- 1971 Carla Bley, Paul Haines – Escalator over the Hill (JCOA)
- 1972 Various – Irrepressible Impulses (Impulse!) – with Archie Shepp among others
- 1972 Archie Shepp – Attica Blues (Impulse!)
- 1973 Marc Levin Ensemble – Songs Dances And Prayers (Sweet Dragon) – with Frank Clayton, Tom Moore, Marc Levin, Billy Hart, Brian Ross, Bala Krishna, Jay Clayton
- 1974 Charles Rouse – Two Is One (Strata-East)
- 1994 Various – Soul Jazz Love Strata-East (Soul Jazz Records) – with Charles Rouse
- 2006 Archie Shepp – The Impulse Story (Impulse!)
- 2009 John Handy – Mosaic Select (Mosaic Records)
- 2013 Mal Waldron – Seven Classic Albums (Real Gone Jazz) – remaster of Mal/3: Sounds
- 2015 Archie Shepp – Things Have Got To Change / The Cry Of My People (Impulse!) – remaster of 1971 release
