= I'm Shooting High =

I'm Shooting High may refer to:

- I'm Shooting High (Gildo Mahones album), 1964
- I'm Shooting High (Ann Richards album), 1958
