= Bob Carter (musician) =

American musician

Robert Kahakalau, known professionally as Bob Carter (February 11, 1922 – August 1, 1993) was an American jazz bassist and arranger.

Born in New Haven, Connecticut in 1922, Carter learned bass and guitar from his father, a vaudeville performer of Hawaiian heritage. He played in local orchestras from 1937 to 1940, toured from 1940 to 1942, and led a trio in Boston in 1944. In 1944–45 he worked in groups on 52nd Street in New York City with Tony Scott, Dizzy Gillespie, Charlie Parker, Stuff Smith, and Charlie Shavers. After playing bebop with Allen Eager and Max Roach in 1946, he worked with Charlie Ventura from 1947 to 1949 and again in 1953–54. In the interim he played with Benny Goodman in 1949–50.

In 1953 he worked with jazz guitarist Johnny Smith and appeared on Smith's albums Jazz at NBC and The Johnny Smith Quintet Featuring Stan Getz.

After his second stint with Ventura, he studied composition with Wesley LaViolette. Later that decade his arrangements were used by Red Norvo, Bob Harrington, and Shelly Manne. He spent 1957–58 in Hawaii, then returned to New York in 1959, where he played with Bobby Hackett. In the early 1960s, he worked in Germany in the orchestra of Kurt Edelhagen. He did little playing after the end of the 1960s. Carter died in Honolulu, Hawaii in 1993 at the age of 71.

== Discography ==
=== As sideman ===
- Will Bradley & Johnny Guarnieri, Live Echoes of the Best in Big Band Boogie (RCA Victor, 1960)
- Stan Getz, The Complete Roost Recordings (Blue Note, 1997)
- Bobby Hackett, The Bobby Hackett Quartet (Capitol, 1959)
- Bobby Hackett, Hawaii Swings (Capitol, 1960)
- Bob Harrington, Vibraphone Fantasy in Jazz with Bob Harrington (Imperial, 1957)
- Miriam Klein, Oscar Klein, Blues and Boogie (Europa, 1969)
- Al Klink/Bob Alexander, Progressive Jazz (Grand Award, 1956)
- Mary Ann McCall and Charlie Ventura, An Evening with Mary Ann McCall and Charlie Ventura (Norgran, 1955)
- Mary Ann McCall and Charlie Ventura, Another Evening with Charlie Ventura and Mary Ann McCall (Norgran, 1954)
- Marian McPartland, On 52nd Street (Savoy, 2000)
- Red Norvo, Hi-Five (RCA Victor, 1957)
- Red Norvo, Red Plays the Blues (RCA Victor, 1958)
- Lucy Reed, The Singing Reed (Fantasy, 1956)
- Johnny Smith, Moonlight in Vermont (Roost, 1956)
- Lou Stein, The Lou Stein Three, Four and Five (Epic, 1955)
- Charlie Ventura, In Chicago 1947 (Zim, 1976)
