= Bob Harrington =

American jazz musician

Robert Maxon Harrington (January 30, 1912, in Marshfield, Wisconsin – August 20, 1983, in Kona, Hawaii) was an American jazz vibraphonist.

Harrington was also adept at drums and piano in addition to vibraphone. He played with Charlie Barnet in the early 1950s on piano, and worked with both Red Nichols and Bud Freeman that decade as a drummer. On vibraphone, he played with Georgie Auld, Buddy DeFranco, Vido Musso, Ben Webster, Ann Richards, and Harry Babasin's Jazzpickers. He released one solo album, Vibraphone Fantasy in Jazz, on Imperial Records in 1957, which is now a collector's item.

== Discography ==
=== As leader ===
- For Moderns Only with the Jazzpickers (Mercury/EmArcy, 1957)
- Vibraphone Fantasy in Jazz with Bob Harrington (Imperial, 1957)
- Jazz a La Carte (Crown, 1963)
- Leachery without Treachery with the Dirty Old Men (Nocturne, 1969)

=== As sideman ===
- Buddy Childers, Sam Songs (Liberty, 1956)
- Bob Keene, Bob Keene and His Orchestra (Fresh Sound 1988)
- Jackie Kelso & Bill Hood, Dirty Old Men (Jazz Chronicles, 1970)
- Ann Richards, Two Much! (Capitol, 1960)
- Steve White, Jazz Mad: The Unpredictable Steve White (Liberty, 1955)
