= Keep the Customer Satisfied =

Keep the Customer Satisfied can refer to:

- Keep the Customer Satisfied (album), a 1970 big band album by jazz drummer Buddy Rich
- "Keep the Customer Satisfied", a song from the Simon & Garfunkel album Bridge over Troubled Water
