= Mal/3: Sounds =

Studio album by Mal Waldron
- Released: 1958
- Recorded: January 31, 1958
- Genre: Jazz
- Length: 43:52
- Label: New Jazz

Mal Waldron chronology
The Dealers (1957)	Mal/3: Sounds (1958)	Mal/4: Trio (1958)

Mal/3: Sounds is an album by American jazz pianist Mal Waldron recorded in 1958 and released on the New Jazz label.

== Reception ==
The Allmusic review by Scott Yanow awarded the album 3 stars stating "The music is not essential but holds one's interest throughout".

Professional ratings
Review scores
Source	Rating
Allmusic	3/5 stars
Penguin Guide to Jazz	3/4 stars

== Track listing ==
All compositions by Mal Waldron except as indicated

1. "Tension" – 6:37
2. "Ollie's Caravan" – 8:39
3. "The Cattin' Toddler" – 6:58
4. "Portrait of a Young Mother" – 8:58
5. "For Every Man There's a Woman" (Harold Arlen, Leo Robin) – 11:40

- Recorded at Van Gelder Studio in Hackensack, New Jersey on January 31, 1958.

== Personnel ==
- Mal Waldron – piano
- Art Farmer – trumpet
- Eric Dixon – flute
- Calo Scott – cello
- Julian Euell – bass
- Elvin Jones – drums
- Elaine Waldron – vocals (tracks 4 & 5)
