= East Meets West (Ahmed Abdul-Malik album) =

Studio album by Ahmed Abdul-Malik

Studio album by Ahmed Abdul-Malik
- Released: 1960
- Recorded: March 16, 1959 & March 31, 1959
- Studio: Webster Hall, New York City
- Genre: Jazz, Arabic music
- Length: 34:12
- Label: RCA Victor; LPM/LSP 2015
- Producer: Lee Schapiro

Ahmed Abdul-Malik chronology
Jazz Sahara (1958)	East Meets West (1960)	The Music of Ahmed Abdul-Malik (1961)

East Meets West (subtitled Musique of Ahmed Abdul-Malik) is the second album by American double bassist Ahmed Abdul-Malik featuring performances recorded in 1959 and originally released on the RCA Victor label the following year.

== Reception ==
Professional ratings
Review scores
Source	Rating
Allmusic	3/5 stars
DownBeat	3/5 stars

Ken Dryden of Allmusic says, "Not a release of interest to everyone but, for the most part, this fusion of vastly different styles of music is quite enjoyable; it's obvious from the start that the musicians were enjoying themselves as it was recorded".

== Track listing ==
All compositions by Ahmed Abdul-Malik

1. "E-Lail (The Night)" – 4:22
2. "La Ilbky (Don't Cry)" – 4:59
3. "Takseem (Solo)" – 5:14
4. "Searchin'" – 4:06
5. "Isma'a (Listen)" – 4:20
6. "Rooh (The Soul)" – 3:46
7. "Mahawara" – 4:18
8. "El Ghada" – 3:07

== Personnel ==
- Ahmed Abdul-Malik – surbahar, oud
- Lee Morgan – trumpet (tracks 1, 2 & 5)
- Curtis Fuller – trombone (tracks 4 & 6–8)
- Jerome Richardson – flute (tracks 4 & 6–8)
- Benny Golson – tenor saxophone
- Johnny Griffin – tenor saxophone (tracks 1, 2 & 5)
- Naim Karacand – violin (tracks 1–3 & 5)
- Ahmed Yetman – kanoon (tracks 1–3 & 5)
- Al Harewood – drums (tracks 1, 2 & 4–8)
- Bilal Abdurraham, Mike Hemway – darabeka (tracks 1, 2 & 5)
- Jakarawan Nasseur – vocals (track 3)
