= Spellbound (Ahmed Abdul-Malik album) =

Studio album by Ahmed Abdul-Malik with Ray Nance and Seldon Powell
- Released: 1964
- Recorded: March 12, 1964
- Studio: Van Gelder Studio, Englewood Cliffs, New Jersey
- Genre: Jazz
- Length: 32:41
- Label: Status; ST 8303
- Producer: Don Schlitten

Ahmed Abdul-Malik chronology
| The Eastern Moods of Ahmed Abdul-Malik (1963) | Spellbound (1964) |

Spellbound is the sixth and final album by double bassist Ahmed Abdul-Malik featuring performances recorded in 1964 and originally released on the Status label.

== Reception ==
Professional ratings
Review scores
| Source | Rating |
|---|---|
| Allmusic | 4/5 stars |

Thom Jurek of Allmusic says, "Spellbound isn't as groundbreaking as some of Abdul-Malik's earlier work, but it doesn't need to be: by this point, he had successfully melded jazz with Middle Eastern sounds into a seamless – if somewhat exotically textural – whole. The band fires on all cylinders under his inspired direction, making this a fitting sendoff to him as a bandleader. Musically, he saved one of his best for last.".

== Track listing ==
1. "Spellbound" (Miklós Rózsa) – 4:57
2. "Never On Sunday" (Manos Hatzidakis) – 5:13
3. "Body and Soul" (Johnny Green, Edward Heyman, Robert Sour, Frank Eyton) – 7:14
4. "Song of Delilah" (Victor Young, Ray Evans) – 7:02
5. "Cinema Blues" (Ahmed Abdul-Malik) – 8:15

== Personnel ==
- Ahmed Abdul-Malik – bass
- Ray Nance – cornet, violin
- Seldon Powell – tenor saxophone, flute
- Paul Neves – piano
- Hamza Aldeen – oud
- Walter Perkins – drums
