= The Gerry Mulligan Songbook =

Studio album by Gerry Mulligan
- Released: 1958
- Recorded: December 4–5, 1957
- Studio: Coastal Studios, New York City
- Genre: Jazz
- Length: 59:24
- Label: World Pacific WP 1237
- Producer: Richard Bock

Gerry Mulligan chronology
| Jazz Concerto Grosso (1957) | The Gerry Mulligan Songbook (1958) | Reunion with Chet Baker (1957) |

The Gerry Mulligan Songbook (subtitled Volume 1) is an album by American jazz saxophonist Gerry Mulligan featuring performances recorded in late 1957 and released on the World Pacific label.

== Holman arrangements ==
This album features many arrangements by the composer/arrange Bill Holman. Gerry Mulligan kept the original parts and scores from this album which can be found in his special collection housed at the Library of Congress. Viewing the original scores housed at the Library of Congress, you will find that Holman had labeled the sax parts with the players he may have intended to perform this music. The sax parts are listed as follows: (Names listed on score do not have last names. Names in parentheses were added here for clarity.)

- 4 & 1 Moore: (Spelling taken from original score. dated 11/57)
  - Art (Pepper) - Alto 1
  - Lee (Konitz) - Alto 2
  - (Bob) Cooper - Tenor 1
  - Gerry (Mulligan) - Baritone 1
  - Willis (Bill Holman) - Baritone 2
- Turnstile: (dated 11/57)
  - Art (Pepper) - Alto 1
  - Lee (Konitz) - Alto 2
  - (Bob) Cooper - Tenor 1
  - Gerry (Mulligan) - Baritone 1
  - Willis (Bill Holman) - Baritone 2
- Sextet: (dated 11/57)
  - Art (Pepper) - Alto 1
  - Lee (Konitz) - Alto 2
  - (Bob) Cooper - Tenor 1
  - Willis (Bill Holman) - Tenor 2
  - Gerry (Mulligan) - Baritone
- D. J. Jump (Spelling taken from original score. Disc Jockey Jump dated 11/57)
  - Art (Pepper) - Alto 1
  - Lee (Konitz) - Alto 2
  - (Bob) Cooper - Tenor 1
  - Willis (Bill Holman) - Tenor 2
  - Gerry (Mulligan) - Baritone
- Venus De Milo: (dated 11/57)
  - Lee (Konitz) - Alto 1
  - Art (Pepper) - Alto 2
  - (Bob) Cooper - Tenor 1
  - Willis (Bill Holman) - Tenor 2
  - Gerry (Mulligan) - Baritone
- Revelation: (dated 11/57)
  - Art (Pepper) - Alto 1
  - Lee (Konitz) - Alto 2
  - Willis (Bill Holman) - Tenor 1
  - (Bob) Cooper - Tenor 2
  - Gerry (Mulligan) - Baritone

After speaking with Bill Holman, he recalls that Richard Bock had come up with the idea for the album, but after Holman had finished the arrangements, Gerry Mulligan was not available in LA to record them. The music was recorded in New York in December 1957 with alternate players. The arrangement for Crazy Day, was not found in the collection with the other 6 arrangements. The finders guide for the Library of Congress lists Crazy Day in the collection, but has no score, only parts. The arrangements in this collection are pencil drawn in Bill Holman's handwriting. The parts were done by a copyist, unnamed, and are not in Mulligan or Holman's handwriting.

== Critical reception ==
Professional ratings
Review scores
| Source | Rating |
|---|---|
| Allmusic | 4.5/5 stars |
| The Penguin Guide to Jazz Recordings | 3.5/4 stars |

The Allmusic review by Scott Yanow stated "this was one of the rarer Gerry Mulligan albums. The original program consisted of seven Mulligan compositions played by a five-sax octet (including the leader on baritone, altoist Lee Konitz, Allen Eager and Zoot Sims doubling on tenor and alto, Al Cohn on tenor and baritone and a rhythm section consisting of guitarist Freddie Green, bassist Henry Grimes, and drummer Dave Bailey). The session has a few surprise touches, giving listeners the rare opportunity to hear Eager and Sims soloing on alto and Cohn doubling on baritone... Highly recommended for Gerry Mulligan fans".

== Track listing ==
All compositions by Gerry Mulligan except as indicated

1. "Four and One Moore" – 4:23
2. "Crazy Day" – 7:05
3. "Turnstile" – 7:53
4. "Sextet" – 4:18
5. "Disc Jockey Jump" – 4:35
6. "Venus de Milo" – 5:08
7. "Revelation" – 5:01
8. "Mayreh" (Horace Silver) – 6:02 Bonus track on CD reissue
9. "The Preacher" (Silver) – 6:25 Bonus track on CD reissue
10. "Good Bait" (Count Basie, Tadd Dameron) – 4:39 Bonus track on CD reissue
11. "Bags' Groove" (Milt Jackson) – 3:55 Bonus track on CD reissue

== Personnel ==
- Gerry Mulligan – baritone saxophone
- Lee Konitz – alto saxophone (tracks 1–7)
- Allen Eager, Zoot Sims – alto saxophone, tenor saxophone (tracks 1–7)
- Al Cohn – tenor saxophone, baritone saxophone (tracks 1–7)
- Freddie Green (tracks 1–7), Paul Palmieri (tracks 8–11) – guitar
- Dick Wetmore – violin (tracks 8–11)
- Calo Scott – cello (tracks 8–11)
- Vinnie Burke (tracks 8–11), Henry Grimes (tracks 1–7) – bass
- Dave Bailey – drums
- Bill Holman – arranger (tracks 1–7)
