= Jazz Sahara =

Studio album by Ahmed Abdul-Malik
- Released: 1958
- Recorded: October 1958; Reeves Sound Studio, New York City
- Genre: Jazz
- Length: 38:47
- Label: Riverside; RLP 12-287
- Producer: Bill Grauer

Ahmed Abdul-Malik chronology
Jazz Sahara (1958)	East Meets West (1960)

Jazz Sahara is the debut album by double bassist and oud player Ahmed Abdul-Malik featuring performances recorded in late 1958 and originally released on the Riverside label.

== Reception ==
Professional ratings
Review scores
Source	Rating
Allmusic	4/5 stars

Scott Yanow of Allmusic says, "an early example of fusing jazz with world music... The music is a qualified success, essentially Middle Eastern folk music with Griffin added in. This set is interesting and, in its own way, innovative but not essential".

== Track listing ==
All compositions by Ahmed Abdul-Malik

1. "Ya Annas" - 11:10
2. "Isma'a" - 9:10
3. "El Haris" - 11:28
4. "Farah 'Alaiyna" - 6:59

== Personnel ==
- Ahmed Abdul-Malik - bass, oud
- Johnny Griffin - tenor saxophone
- Naim Karacand - violin
- Al Harewood - drums
- Bilal Abdurrahman - tambourine
- Jack Ghanaim - kanoon
- Mike Hemway - darabeka
