= The Many Moods of Ann Richards =

Studio album by Ann Richards
- Released: 1960 (Capitol T-1406, stereo)
- Recorded: 1959
- Studio: Capitol Studios, Hollywood, CA
- Genre: Jazz; Traditional pop
- Label: Capitol
- Producer: Ed Yellin

Ann Richards chronology
I'm Shooting High (1958)	The Many Moods of Ann Richards (1960)	Two Much! (1961)

The Many Moods of Ann Richards is the 1960 solo album recorded by Ann Richards and her second release for Capitol Records (Capitol T-T-1406, stereo). The arrangers for the sessions are Ralph Carmichael, Bill Holman, and Tak Shindo.

Jason Ankeny writes in AllMusic, "The Many Moods of Ann Richards captures the singer in a series of different contexts and styles, precisely the kind of project that could amount to little more than a patchwork mess in the hands of a lesser talent. But arrangers Ralph Carmichael, Bill Holman, and Tak Shindo all prove sympathetic collaborators, spotlighting Richards' smoldering vocals in milieus that perfectly complement her lusty vibrato." The review praises the blend of Holman's jazz and Shindo's Eastern exotica influences with Richards demonstrating confident versatile performances with both.

== Track listing ==
1. "By Myself" (Howard Dietz, Arthur Schwartz)
2. "Be Easy, Be Tender" (Joe Greene)
3. "Where Did You Go? (Jordu)" (Duke Jordan, Ernie Williams)
4. "I'm Gonna Laugh You Right Out of My Life" (Cy Coleman, Joseph McCarthy)
5. "I Gotta Have You" (Arnold Horwitt, Richard Lewine)
6. "Lazy Afternoon" (John Latouche, Jerome Moross)
7. "Something's Coming" (Leonard Bernstein, Stephen Sondheim)
8. "Everytime" (Ralph Blane, Hugh Martin)
9. "Poor Little Extra Girl" (Mel Tormé)
10. "Absence Makes the Heart Grow Fonder"
11. "Seasons Reasons" (Joe Greene)
12. "I'm Late" (Tom Adair, Bob Hilliard)

== Reception ==
Professional ratings
Review scores
Source	Rating
Billboard	3/4 stars
Down Beat	4/5 stars

"Thrush Ann Richards as strongly jazz-oriented. She seems to sense the mood of a song well and she good use of an improvisational technique in her phrases. Here, her moods range widely from the happy side ("Im' Gonna Laugh") to a soft offbeat mood ("Lazy Afternoon")."

Billboard Magazine, July 11, 1960
