= Sounds of Africa =

Studio album by Ahmed Abdul-Malik
- Released: 1962
- Recorded: May 23, 1961 and August 22, 1962
- Studio: Van Gelder Studio, Englewood Cliffs, New Jersey
- Genre: Jazz
- Length: 35:17
- Label: New Jazz; NJLP 8282
- Producer: Esmond Edwards

Ahmed Abdul-Malik chronology
The Music of Ahmed Abdul-Malik (1961)	Sounds of Africa (1962)	The Eastern Moods of Ahmed Abdul-Malik (1963)

Sounds of Africa is the fourth album by double bassist and oud player Ahmed Abdul-Malik featuring performances recorded in 1962 (with one track from 1961) and originally released on the New Jazz label.

== Reception ==
Professional ratings
Review scores
Source	Rating
Allmusic	4/5 stars

Rob Ferrier of Allmusic says, "Soaked with sounds that wouldn't become fashionable in jazz for nearly another decade, this is a very interesting statement by an overlooked musician... For those looking for something new, or perhaps in search of a missing musical link, this disc will reward repeated listens".

== Track listing ==
All compositions by Ahmed Abdul-Malik except as indicated

1. "Wakida Hena" - 3:53
2. "African Bossa Nova" - 6:00
3. "Nadusilma" - 4:00
4. "Out of Nowhere" (Johnny Green, Edward Heyman) - 5:00
5. "Communication" - 9:46
6. "Suffering" - 5:13
- Recorded at Van Gelder Studio on May 23, 1961 (track 4) and August 22, 1962 (tracks 1–3, 5 & 6)

== Personnel ==
- Ahmed Abdul-Malik - bass, oud
- Tommy Turrentine (track 4), Richard Williams (tracks 1–3, 5 & 6) - trumpet
- Rupert Alleyne - flute (tracks 1–3, 5 & 6)
- Bilal Abdurrahman - clarinet, percussion
- Edwin Steede - alto saxophone (tracks 1–3, 5 & 6)
- Taft Chandler (tracks 1–3, 5 & 6), Eric Dixon (track 4) - tenor saxophone
- Calo Scott - cello, violin
- Rudy Collins (tracks 1–3, 5 & 6), Andrew Cyrille (track 4) - drums
- Chief Bey - African drums (tracks 1–3, 5 & 6)
- Montego Joe - congas, bongos (tracks 1–3, 5 & 6)
