= Wesley LaViolette =

American musician

Wallace Wesley LaViolette (4 Jan 1894 Saint James, Minnesota - 29 Jul 1978 Escondido, California) was an American musician who composed, conducted, lectured, and wrote about music. He was also a poet and music theorist. As an educator, he mentored Shorty Rogers, Jimmy Giuffre, John Graas, George Perle, Florence Price, Bob Carter, Bob Florence and Robert Erickson and writer William Irwin Thompson. Laviolette was an important figure on the West coast jazz scene of the 1950s.

== Career ==
LaViolette received his undergraduate degree in music from Northwestern University in 1917. He earned three graduate degrees. From 1923 to 1933, LaViolette was dean of the Chicago Musical College. He served as director for DePaul University School of Music from 1933 until 1938. In 1930 he received the David Bispham Medal Award for his opera Falstaff (or possibly Shylock.)

In the 1950s LaViolette was the teacher for many writers and players associated with the West Coast jazz scene. LaViolette supported their work, calling them "America's musical contribution to tomorrow ... I don't always LIKE what they do - but I respect it."

== Selected compositions ==
- Largo Lyrico, string quartet (1941)
- Prelude and Aria, symphonic work (1941); premiered by the Cincinnati Symphony Orchestra November 14 and 15, 1941
- Autumn, from Songs of love, a song cycle based on Chopin compositions, for high voice, piano, and orchestra; music: Alexander Laszlo, words: Wesley LaViolette (1954)
- Irridescence, from Songs of love, a song cycle based on Chopin compositions, for high voice, piano, and orchestra; music: Alexander Laszlo, words: Wesley LaViolette (1954)
- Lilac time, from Songs of love, a song cycle based on Chopin compositions, for high voice, piano, and orchestra; music: Alexander Laszlo, words: Wesley LaViolette (1954)
- Love laughed, from Songs of love, a song cycle based on Chopin compositions, for high voice, piano, and orchestra; music: Alexander Laszlo, words: Wesley LaViolette (1954)
- The Wayfarer: An Interpretation of the Dhammapada, published by DeVores & Co. (1956)
- Charade, for four flutes (1946)
- Sonata, for flute and piano (1946)

== Collections ==
- The LaViolette Collection — which included his own recordings, books, scores, photographs and personal papers — is archived at The Los Angeles Jazz Institute, California State University, Long Beach.
- The original manuscript of LaViolette's First Symphony (1935) is housed at the Library of Congress, Washington, D.C.

== Career positions ==
- Professor of Music Composition, DePaul University, Chicago
- Professor of Music Composition, American Conservatory of Music, Chicago
- Professor of Music Composition, Thornton School of Music, University of Southern California, Los Angeles
