= Two Much! =

Studio album by Ann Richards and the Stan Kenton Orchestra
- Released: 1961
- Recorded: July 20–22, 1960
- Studio: Capitol (Hollywood)
- Genre: Jazz
- Label: Capitol T/ST 1495
- Producer: Ed Yelin

Stan Kenton chronology
| Road Show (1959) | Two Much! (1961) | The Romantic Approach (1961) |

Ann Richards chronology
| The Many Moods of Ann Richards (1959) | Two Much! (1960) | Ann, Man! (1961) |

Two Much! is an album by vocalist Ann Richards and the Stan Kenton Orchestra recorded in 1960 and released by Capitol Records, and later on Kenton's own Creative World label.

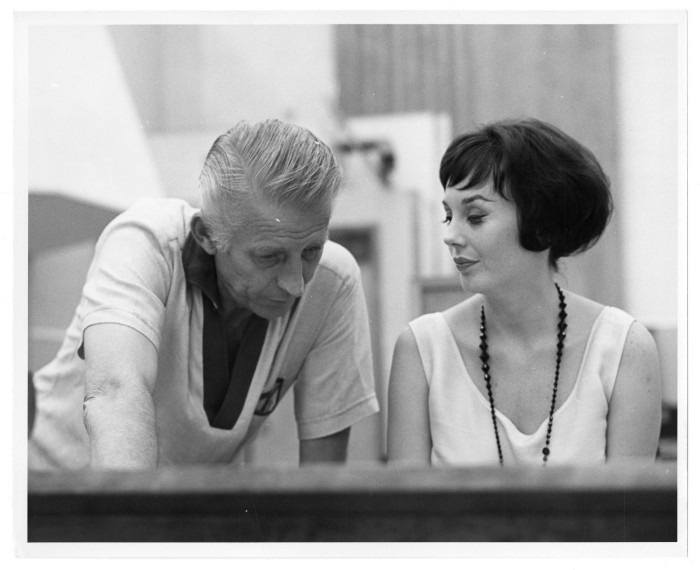
Ann Richards and Stan Kenton at Capitol Studios in Hollywood during the July 1960 recording sessions for Two Much!

It was her third and last solo release for Capitol Records.

== Reception ==
Professional ratings
Review scores
| Source | Rating |
|---|---|
| AllMusic | 4/5 stars |
| Billboard | Spotlight Winner |

The AllMusic review by Dave Nathan noted "With a slim discography, this album is an important contribution to the legacy of a good singer whose career was far too short".

== Track listing ==
1. "It's a Wonderful World" (Jan Savitt, Johnny Watson, Harold Adamson) – 3:54
2. "The Morning After (The Night Before)" (Hal Winn, Ethel Gould) – 4:03
3. "I Was the Last One to Know" (Hub Atwood, Ruth Bourne) – 3:54
4. "My Kinda Love" (Louis Alter, Jo Trent) – 4:36
5. "I Got Rhythm" (George Gershwin, Ira Gershwin) – 4:05
6. "No Moon at All" (David Mann, Redd Evans) – 4:36
7. "Don't Be That Way" (Edgar Sampson, Benny Goodman, Mitchell Parish) – 3:50
8. "Suddenly I'm Sad" (Bill Cody, Karen O'Hara) – 4:08
9. "Nobody Like My Baby (Gene Roland) – 3:12
10. "All Or Nothing At All" (Arthur Altman, Jack Lawrence) – 3:54
- Recorded at Capitol Studios in Hollywood, CA on July 20, 1960 (tracks 2 & 5–7), July 21, 1960 (tracks 4 & 8) and July 22, 1960 (tracks 1, 3, 9 & 10).

== Personnel ==
- Ann Richards – vocals
- Stan Kenton – conductor
- John Anderson, Bud Brisbois, Steve Hufsteter, Al Porcino, Bob Rolfe – trumpet (tracks 1, 2 & 4–10)
- Bob Fitzpatrick, Dick Hyde, David Sanchez – trombone
- Jim Amlotte, Bob Knight – bass trombone
- Gabe Baltazar – alto saxophone
- Modesto Briseno, Paul Renzi – tenor saxophone
- Marvin Holladay, Wayne Dunstan – baritone saxophone
- Bob Harrington – piano
- Don Bagley – bass
- Art Anton – drums
- Mike Pacheco – percussion (tracks 1 & 10)
- Wayne Dunstan (track 1), Bill Holman (tracks 2, 5 & 7), Stan Kenton (tracks 3 & 9), Johnny Richards (tracks 4, 8 & 10), Gene Roland (track 6) – arranger
