= The Eastern Moods of Ahmed Abdul-Malik =

Studio album by Ahmed Abdul-Malik
- Released: November 1963
- Recorded: June 13, 1963
- Studio: Van Gelder Studio, Englewood Cliffs, New Jersey
- Genre: Jazz
- Length: 37:57
- Label: Prestige; PR 160003
- Producer: Ozzie Cadena

Ahmed Abdul-Malik chronology
Sounds of Africa (1962)	The Eastern Moods of Ahmed Abdul-Malik (1963)	Spellbound (1964)

The Eastern Moods of Ahmed Abdul-Malik is an album by the double bassist and oud player Ahmed Abdul-Malik that was released through Prestige Records label in November 1963.

== Track listing ==
All compositions by Ahmed Abdul-Malik except where noted

1. "Summertime" (George Gershwin, Ira Gershwin, DuBose Heyward) - 10:19
2. "Ancient Scene" - 7:16
3. "Magrebi" - 5:18
4. "Sa-Ra-Ga' Ya-Hindi" - 9:47
5. "Shoof Habebe" - 5:17

== Personnel ==
- Ahmed Abdul-Malik - bass, oud
- Bilal Abdurrahman - alto saxophone, clarinet, Korean reed flute, percussion
- William Henry Allen - bass, percussion
