= Buddy & Soul =

Live album by Buddy Rich
- Released: 1969
- Recorded: January 3–22, 1969
- Venue: Whisky a Go Go, West Hollywood, California
- Genre: Jazz
- Length: 40:12 (LP) 73:17 (CD)
- Label: World Pacific Jazz
- Producer: Richard Bock

Buddy Rich chronology
Mercy, Mercy (1968)	Buddy & Soul (1969)	Keep the Customer Satisfied (1970)

Professional ratings
Review scores
Source	Rating
Allmusic	3/5 stars
The Penguin Guide to Jazz Recordings	3/4 stars

Buddy & Soul is a 1969 live album by the Buddy Rich Big Band, recorded at the Whisky a Go Go club in West Hollywood, California.

== Track listing ==
LP side A

1. "Soul Lady" (Don Sebesky) – 4:55
2. "St. Petersburg Race" (Mike Mainieri) – 2:43
3. "Soul Kitchen" (Jim Morrison, Robby Krieger, Ray Manzarek, John Densmore) – 3:57
4. "Wonderbag" (Kim Richmond) – 4:51
5. "Ruth" (Bill Holman) – 4:12

LP side B

1. "Love and Peace" (Arthur Adams) – 3:38
2. "Hello, I Love You" (Morrison, Krieger, Manzarek, Densmore) – 4:17
3. "Comin' Home Baby" (Bob Dorough, Ben Tucker) – 3:17
4. "The Meaning of the Blues" (Bobby Troup, Leah Worth) – 3:44
5. "Greensleeves" (Traditional) – 4:38

Bonus tracks on 2000 CD reissue

11. "Mexicali Nose" (Harry Betts) – 3:36
12. "Buddy Buddy" (Allyn Ferguson) – 3:48
13. "Acid Truth" (Don Menza) – 5:08
14. "Parthenia" (Shelly Manne) – 5:03
15. "Street Kiddie" (Holman) – 3:40
16. "The Word" (Don Piestrup) – 5:51
17. "It's Crazy" (Holman) – 5:59

== Personnel ==
The Buddy Rich big band

- Buddy Rich - drums
- Richie Cole - alto saxophone
- Joe Romano - clarinet, flute, alto saxophone
- Ernie Watts – clarinet, flute, alto saxophone
- Pat La Barbera - clarinet, flute, tenor saxophone
- Don Menza - flute, soprano saxophone, tenor saxophone
- Joe Calo - baritone saxophone
- Dave Culp - trumpet
- Sal Marquez - trumpet
- Nat Pavone - trumpet
- Michael Price - trumpet
- Bob Yance - trumpet
- Vince Diaz - trombone
- Rick Stepton - trombone
- Don Switzer - trombone, bass trombone
- Herb Ellis - guitar
- David Lahm - organ, piano
- Bob Magnusson - double bass, bass guitar, fender jazz bass
- Larry Bunker - percussion
- Victor Feldman - percussion
- Arranged by: Dick Clements, Bill Holman, Mike Mainieri, Don Piestrup. Kim Richmond, Shorty Rogers, Joe Sample & Don Sebesky

Production

- Ron Wolin - art direction, design
- Lee Hershberg - engineer
- Lanky Linstrot
- Dean Pratt - producer, liner notes
- Bob Belden - producer, remixing
- Richard Bock - producer
- Patrick Roques - reissue design
- Joel Moss - remixing
