= The Music of Ahmed Abdul-Malik =

Studio album by Ahmed Abdul-Malik
- Released: 1961
- Recorded: May 23, 1961
- Studio: Van Gelder Studio, Englewood Cliffs, New Jersey
- Genre: Jazz
- Length: 34:26
- Label: New Jazz; NJLP 8266
- Producer: Esmond Edwards

Ahmed Abdul-Malik chronology
East Meets West (1960)	The Music of Ahmed Abdul-Malik (1961)	Sounds of Africa (1962)

The Music of Ahmed Abdul-Malik is the third album by double bassist and oud player Ahmed Abdul-Malik featuring performances recorded in 1961 and originally released on the New Jazz label.

== Reception ==
Professional ratings
Review scores
Source	Rating
Allmusic	4.5/5 stars

Eugene Chadbourne of Allmusic says "This jazz musician of Sudanese descent [sic] shows up here and there on recording sessions from the '60s, including a stint as a member of Thelonious Monk's combo. He also played oud and took part in a variety of attempts to blend his roots music with jazz, out of which this is one of the most successful". (Abdul-Malik was actually of Caribbean descent.)

== Track listing ==
All compositions by Ahmed Abdul-Malik except as indicated

1. "Nights on Saturn" - 7:25
2. "The Hustlers" - 5:25
3. "Oud Blues" - 4:03
4. "La Ikbey" - 5:44
5. "Don't Blame Me" (Jimmy McHugh, Dorothy Fields) - 7:14
6. "Hannibal's Carnivals" - 4:35

== Personnel ==
- Ahmed Abdul-Malik - bass, oud
- Tommy Turrentine - trumpet
- Bilal Abdurrahman - clarinet, percussion
- Eric Dixon - tenor saxophone
- Calo Scott - cello
- Andrew Cyrille - drums
