= In Search of the Mystery =

Studio album by Gato Barbieri
- Released: 1967
- Recorded: March 15, 1967
- Studio: New York City
- Genre: Free jazz
- Length: 39:29
- Label: ESP-Disk; ESP 1049

Gato Barbieri chronology
In Search of the Mystery (1967)	Confluence (1968)

In Search of the Mystery is the debut album by saxophonist Gato Barbieri. It was recorded in New York City on March 15, 1967, and was released later that year by ESP-Disk. On the album, Barbieri is joined by cellist Calo Scott, bassist Norris Jones, and drummer Bobby Kapp.

== Reception ==
Professional ratings
Review scores
Source	Rating
AllMusic	3.5/5 stars
All About Jazz	4.5/5 stars
The Guardian	3/5 stars
The Penguin Guide to Jazz	3/4 stars
The Free Jazz Collective	4/5 stars

In a review for AllMusic, Michael G. Nastos wrote: "While the string players swim around the rhythms of Kapp, Barbieri dives right in with no fear of the outcome, allowing the others to stretch into harmonic and sonic arenas of their own choosing. This democratic approach enhances the music without need for time signatures... this unique recording... must be considered one of [Barbieri's] prime -- if not primal -- early works."

The authors of The Penguin Guide to Jazz Recordings stated: "To anyone who only knows the Latin Barbieri... this early disc... will come as a complete shock... the... album is howlingly intense and unremitting."

Raul d'Gama Rose of All About Jazz commented: "Gato Barbieri winds up and uncorks a meandering apocalyptic shout that begins with a growling, sinewy tenor and often returns there via a continuous spiral of bell-like primal screeches. He is probing, poking the tones of the tenor and searching madly for a timbral key to unlock a hidden route to harmonic peace."

The Guardian's John Fordham called the album "a unique document," and stated that it finds Barbieri "unleashing fearsome multiphonic tenor-sax blasts... It's pretty full-on."

A reviewer for The Free Jazz Collective remarked: "this quartet does what it should do: play the bejesus out of their instruments. Barbieri plays like we know him from his collaborations with Carla Bley and Don Cherry: screaming, overblowing, full blast and full energy, but full of a natural melodicism and fully supported by this band."

== Track listing ==
All compositions by Gato Barbieri. Track timings not provided.

1. "In Search of the Mystery"
2. "Michelle"
3. "Obsession No. 2"
4. "Cinemateque"

== Personnel ==
- Gato Barbieri – saxophone
- Calo Scott – cello
- Norris Jones – bass
- Bobby Kapp – drums
