= Charlie Shoemake =

American jazz vibraphonist (born 1937)

- Born: Charles Edward Shoemake; July 27, 1937 (age 88); Houston, Texas, U.S.
- Genres: Jazz
- Occupations: Musician, educator
- Instrument: Vibraphone
- Years active: 1960s–present
- Labels: Muse, Chase
- Website: www.talsanmusic.com

Charlie Shoemake (born July 27, 1937) is an American jazz vibraphonist. He played in George Shearing's Quintet for seven years, starting in 1967. He also played vibes on the soundtrack of the Clint Eastwood film Bird. He is the director of the Central Coast Jazz Institute in Cambria, California.

His wife, Sandi Shoemake, is a jazz singer and sings on many of his albums.
