= Dick Wetmore =

American jazz musician

Dick Wetmore (January 13, 1927 – January 4, 2007) was an American jazz and bebop violinist. He played several musical instruments including the cornet, trumpet and string bass. Wetmore worked primarily as a sideman, but also led his own jazz ensembles.

== Biography ==
Born Richard Byron Wetmore in Glens Falls, New York, he played the violin before entering the Army, but wished to join the Army Band and taught himself to play the cornet. He had formal musical training at the New England Conservatory of Music, but credited his improvisational skills to his period in the army.

Wetmore was a sideman in groups led by Gerry Mulligan, Charlie Parker, Billie Holiday, Sarah Vaughan and Dizzy Gillespie. His discography includes The Gerry Mulligan Songbook, in which he is part of a jazz string quartet. He also led, and recorded, with his own combos. In 1996, Wetmore performed as a jazz soloist with the Cape Cod Symphony Orchestra, where he improvised songs by George Gershwin and Jerome Kern.

Jack Chambers, a University of Toronto professor who writes about jazz, called Wetmore "a jazz chameleon with professional skills on both trumpet and violin, and equally at home playing Dixieland or bebop or cool jazz." Chambers subsequently stated about the mid-1950s album, Wetmore Plays Zieff, as "beautifully crafted, and it stands as one of the most obscure great records in modern jazz." A track from his album, Dick Wetmore (1952), was included in the Smithsonian Institution's collection of greatest jazz recordings. All songs would later be recorded by Chet Baker with the short-lived pianist Richard Twardzik.

Wetmore performed into the 21st century, until shortly before his death, at the age of 79, from emphysema in Indianapolis, Indiana.

== Discography ==
=== As leader ===
- Dick Wetmore (Bethlehem, 1955)

=== As sideman ===
- Vinnie Burke, Vinnie Burke's String Jazz Quartet (ABC-Paramount, 1957)
- Gerry Mulligan, The Gerry Mulligan Songbook (Pacific Jazz 1995)
- Tony Ortega, Jazz for Young Moderns (And Old Buzzards, Too) (Bethlehem, 1959)
- Nat Pierce, Chamber Music for Moderns (Coral, 1957)
