= Chuck Cabot =

American saxophonist and big band leader (1915–2007)

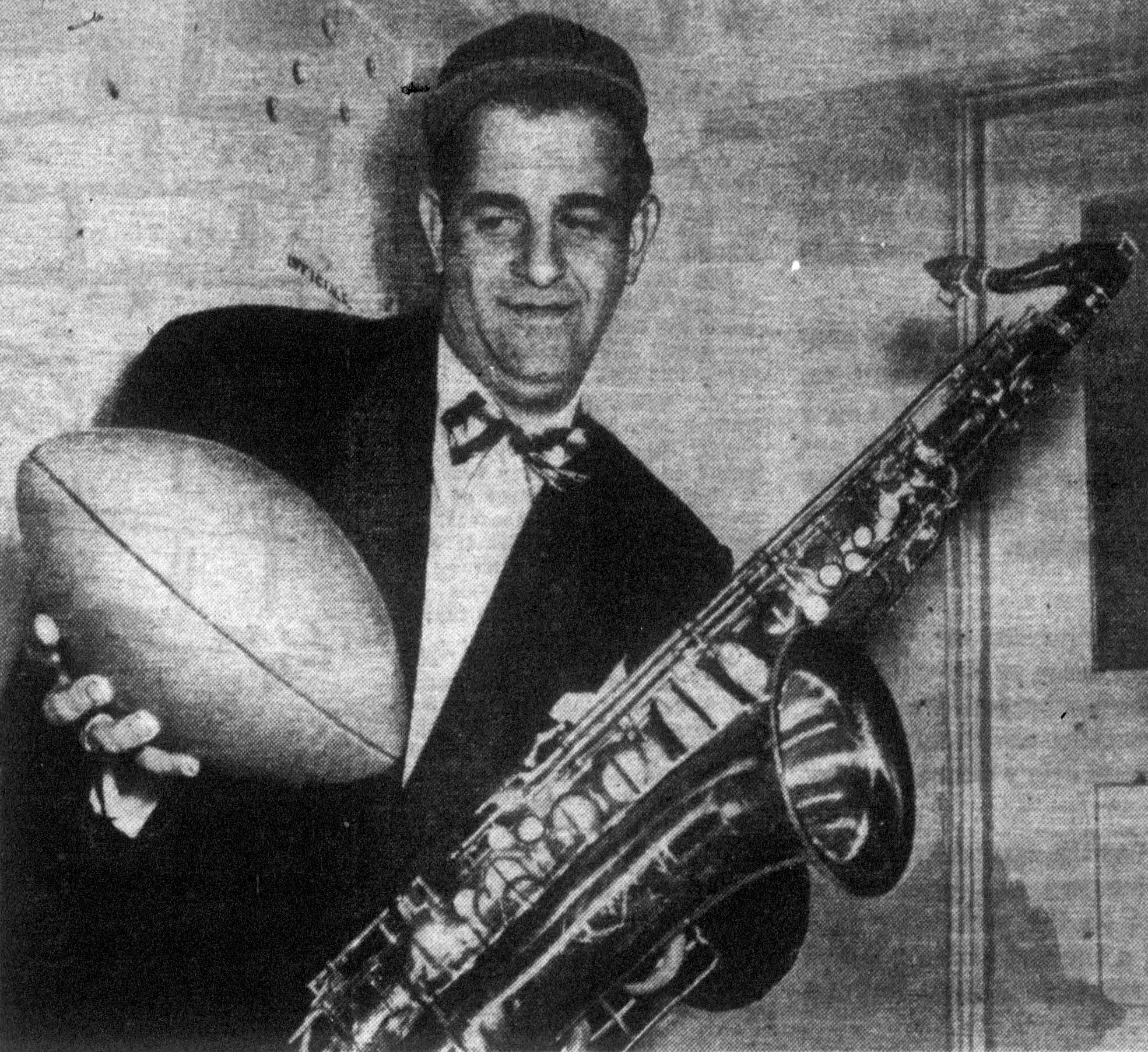
- Cabot, circa 1949

Background information
- Born: Carlos Guillermo Cascales; 16 May 1915; Querétaro, Querétaro, Mexico
- Died: 27 December 2007 (aged 92)
- Genres: Jazz, big band
- Occupations: Saxophonist, bandleader, talent agent
- Instrument: Saxophone
- Years active: 1937–2007
- Label: Atomic Records

Chuck Cabot (né Carlos Guillermo Cascales; 16 May 1915 Querétaro, Mexico – 27 December 2007) was an American saxophonist and big band leader. The Chuck Cabot Orchestra launched in 1937 while Cabot (Cascales) was a student at the University of Southern California. He later transferred to the University of California at Los Angeles where he became a member of the legendary UCLA 1939 football team along with Jackie Robinson, Kenny Washington, and Woody Strode. In the early 1940 he was athletic coach at El Monte, Jefferson, and Hamilton High Schools.

His orchestra played to capacity crowds in the 1940s and 1950s in ballrooms such as Roseland in New York, the Palladium in Hollywood, and the Catalina Island Casino.

He co-partnered with Arthur Benson in the forming of Hollywood International Talents. He was instrumental in discovering and securing recording contracts for 'Los Nomadas,' the first inter-racial rock and roll band. He recognized the individual talents of the band's lead guitarist Bill Aken. (Adopted son of Cabot's friends Francisco & Lupe Mayorga) Changing Aken's name to 'Zane Ashton,' he was instrumental in launching the young singer/guitarist's solo career. He lived long enough to see his young protege inducted into the Musician's Hall of Fame as a member of 'The Wrecking Crew' in November, 2007.

Beginning in the 1960s until shortly before his death, Cascales booked performances for The Coasters, The Drifters, and The Shirelles. He also organized the Rolling Stones' first West Coast concert tour.

Cabot and His Orchestra recorded on the Atomic label in Hollywood in the 1940s.

His brothers, Johnny Richards, Jose Luis Cascales (Joe), and Juan Adolfo Cascales (Jack) were also professional musicians.

== Selected discography ==
Chuck Cabot and His Orchestra
Atomic Records (78 rpm)

- A-1001 Psychopathic Sally from the San Fernando Valley OCLC 84483297
- B-1001 Swan Lake OCLC 84483752
- A–1002 Part time Sweetheart
- B–1002 Bewitched
- A–1003 I Used to Call Her Baby
- B–1003 Ruth
- A–1004 In San Francisco (Long Ago)
- B–1004 Wedding Waltz
- A–1005 Come into My Arms
- B–1005 Down the Lane
