= I'm Shooting High (Ann Richards album) =

Studio album by Ann Richards
- Released: November 3, 1958 (Capitol T-1087, stereo)
- Recorded: 1958
- Studio: Capitol Studios, Hollywood, CA
- Genre: Jazz; Traditional pop
- Label: Capitol
- Producer: Lee Gillette

Ann Richards chronology
Kenton with Voices (1957)	I'm Shooting High (1958)	The Many Moods of Ann Richards (1960)

I'm Shooting High is the first solo album recorded by Ann Richards released for Capitol Records in November 1958 (Capitol T-1087, stereo). The arranger for the session was Warren Barker and all selections for the album were conducted by Brian Farnon.

Will Friedwald writes in his A Biographical Guide to the Great Jazz and Pop Singers: "After four years of just being Mrs. Stan Kenton, Richards recorded her first solo album, I'm Shooting High, for which arranger and saxophonist Warren Barker supplied Kenton-Rugolo-style charts."

== Track listing ==
1. "I'm Shooting High" (Jimmy McHugh, Ted Koehler)
2. "Moanin' Low" (Howard Dietz, Ralph Rainger)
3. "Nightingale" (Fred Wise, George Rosner, Xavier Cugat)
4. "Blues In My Heart" (Benny Carter, Irving Mills)
5. "I've Got To Pass Your House To Get To My House" (Lew Brown)
6. "Deep Night" (Charles Henderson, Rudy Vallee)
7. "Poor Little Rich Girl" (Noël Coward)
8. "Should I" (Arthur Freed, Nacio Herb Brown)
9. "I'm In The Market For You" (James F. Hanley, Joseph McCarthy)
10. "Absence Makes The Heart Grow Fonder (For Somebody Else)" (Harry Warren, Joe Young, Sam Lewis)
11. "Lullaby Of Broadway" (Al Dubin, Harry Warren)
12. "Will You Still Be Mine?" (Matt Dennis, Tom Adair)

All selections arranged by Warren Barker

== Reception ==
Professional ratings
Review scores
Source	Rating
Allmusic	4/5 stars

"...she's pleasing to the ear on the exotic Nightingale and on the swinging Will You Still Be Mine..."

Will Friedwald, A Biographical Guide to the Great Jazz and Pop Singers

"...Richards displays an appealing voice and a swinging style. She was best at this point on upbeat material, so the highlights include I'm Shooting High, Poor Little Rich Girl and Will You Still Be Mine."

Scott Yanow, Allmusic Guide
