= Keep the Customer Satisfied (album) =

Live album by Buddy Rich
- Released: 1970
- Recorded: March 30–April 1, 1970
- Venue: Tropicana Resort & Casino, Las Vegas
- Genre: Jazz
- Length: 43:36 (LP) 71:30 (CD)
- Label: Liberty Records
- Producer: Richard Bock

Buddy Rich chronology
Buddy & Soul (1969)	Keep the Customer Satisfied (1970)	Are You Ready for This? (1971)

Professional ratings
Review scores
Source	Rating
Allmusic	4/5 stars
DownBeat	4/5 stars

Keep the Customer Satisfied is a 1970 live album by the Buddy Rich Big Band, recorded at the Tropicana Resort & Casino in Las Vegas.

== Track listing ==
LP side A

1. "Keep the Customer Satisfied" (Paul Simon) – 6:40
2. "Long Day's Journey" (Don Piestrup) – 4:42
3. Midnight Cowboy Medley: "He Quit Me Man"/"Everybody's Talkin'"/"Tears and Joys" Jeffrey Comanor) – 11:12

LP side B

1. "Celebration" (Don Piestrup) – 3:35
2. "Groovin' Hard" (Don Menza) – 5:25
3. "The Juicer Is Wild" (Neil, Roger Neuman) – 4:32
4. "Winning the West" (Bill Holman) – 7:30

Bonus tracks on CD re-issues:

8. "Body and Soul" (Frank Eyton, Johnny Green, Edward Heyman, Robert Sour) – 4:54
9. "Happy Time" (Mike Hughes) – 3:57
10. "The Nitty Gritty" (Lincoln Chase) – 4:07
11. "Straight and Narrow" (Don Piestrup) – 4:17
12. "Groovin' Hard" (Don Menza) – 5:54
13. "Cornerstone" (Ted Pease) – 4:45

== Personnel ==
The Buddy Rich big band

- Buddy Rich - drums
- Bob Suchoski - baritone saxophone
- Rick Laird - double bass
- Richie Cole - flute, alto saxophone
- Jimmy Mosher - alto saxophone
- Pat LaBarbera - tenor saxophone
- Don Englert - flute, soprano saxophone, tenor saxophone
- Tony Lada - secord trombone
- Rick Stepton - first trombone
- John Madrid - trumpet
- Joe Giorgiani
- Mike Price - lead trumpet
- George Zonce - second trumpet
- Meredith "Mick" McClain - piano
- Roger Neuman - arranger
- Bill Holman - arranger
- Michael Hughes
- Don Menza
- Ted Pease
- Don Piestrup - arranger
- Joe Sample

Production

- Ron Wolin - cover design
- Reice Hamel - engineer
- Paul Wertheimer - liner notes
- Joel Moss - mixing
- Ron Waller - photography
- Richard Bock - producer
- Bob Belden - reissue producer, mixing
- Dean Pratt - reissue producer
