= Ahmed Abdul-Malik =

American jazz musician

- Born: Jonathan Tim, Jr. January 30, 1927; Brooklyn, New York, US
- Died: October 2, 1993 (aged 66) Long Branch, New Jersey, US
- Genre: Jazz
- Occupation: Musician
- Instruments: Double bass Oud
- Label: Prestige

Ahmed Abdul-Malik (born Jonathan Tim Jr.; January 30, 1927 – October 2, 1993) was an American jazz double bassist and oud player.

Abdul-Malik is remembered for integrating Middle Eastern and North African music styles in his jazz music. He was a bass player for Art Blakey, Earl Hines, Randy Weston, and Thelonious Monk, among others. Abdul-Malik recorded six albums as a leader between 1958 and 1964 before moving into jazz education.

== Early life ==
Abdul-Malik claimed that his father was from Sudan and moved to the United States. Research by historian Robin Kelley, however, indicates that Abdul-Malik was born to Caribbean immigrants and changed his birth name:

Ahmed Abdul-Malik was born Jonathan Tim Jr., (sometimes spelled "Timm") on January 30, 1927, to Matilda and Jonathan Tim Sr. – both of whom had immigrated from St. Vincent in the British West Indies three years earlier. They also had a daughter, Caroline, born a little more than a year after Jonathan Jr. Jonathan Tim Sr.'s death certificate not only confirms his birth in St. Vincent, it indicates that his father – Abdul-Malik's grandfather – James Tim, and his mother, Mary Daniels, were both from the Caribbean. City directories for Brooklyn, as well as the American Federation of Musicians Union Local 802 directory, confirm the bassist's birth name as Jonathan Tim Jr.

Jonathan Jr. was born in Brooklyn. The family lived at 545 Hopkinson Avenue in Brownsville, Brooklyn, but moved to 1984 Atlantic Avenue in nearby Crown Heights, Brooklyn before their son began school. Jonathan Jr. had violin lessons from his father, who was a plasterer and general laborer. Aged seven, Jonathan Jr. attended the Vardi School of Music and Art, "to continue his violin training, and over time took up piano, cello, bass, and tuba." His parents divorced in the late 1930s, and he lived with his father and new wife, at 2117 Dean Street, but his father died on February 9, 1941, from a bleeding gastric ulcer. Jonathan Jr. continued studying, including having lessons with local bassist Franklin Skeete, before joining The High School of Music & Art in Harlem. There, "his skills on violin and viola earned him a spot in the All-City Orchestra."

In 1944, Abdul-Malik started his career as a professional bass player during the midst of New York's be-bop scene. During this time, Abdul-Malik started to experiment with instruments such as the oud and zither-like kanoon. While studying at the New York High School of Music & Art, he immersed himself in Syrian, West African, and Lebanese music. While taking music lessons from members of these cultures, he converted to Islam and adopted the name Ahmed Abdul-Malik.

When Abdul-Malik changed his name, some black musicians were trying to separate themselves from the popular big bands and chose to do this in part through joining the Ahmadiyya movement, where musicians were urged to stop using drugs and alcohol, and perceive themselves as members of a broader Islamic world. By the mid-1950s, Abdul-Malik had worked with prominent jazz musicians such as Art Blakey, Coleman Hawkins, Don Byas, and Randy Weston. During this time, he continued his goals of fusing jazz with music from the Arab world, but at the time there was little commercial interest in this music, giving Abdul-Malik few opportunities to perform this fledgling hybrid of music.

== Later life and career ==
In 1957, while a member of Thelonious Monk's quartet, Monk and John Coltrane encouraged Abdul-Malik to start his own ensemble, which was formed in late 1957. This group featured Abdul-Malik playing both bass and oud, as well as violinist Naim Karakand, Jack Ghanaim on qanun, Mike Hemway playing the darbuka, and Bilal Abdurahman on reed instruments.

In the summer of 1958, his playing on the Monk album Misterioso got Abdul-Malik more attention and allowed him to start his own recording career, releasing six albums from 1958 to 1964. His debut album as a leader, Jazz Sahara, contained four songs, each signifying a different maqam or Arabic mode. In the song "'Ya Annas", Abdul-Malik started the song in 3/4 rhythm but shifted to 4/4 after around seven minutes. This first album can be viewed as a predecessor to the Indo-jazz playing of Joe Harriott and John Mayer around a decade later.

Abdul-Malik's next album was East Meets West in 1959. Daniel Spicer, a writer for The Quietus, describes a solo from Jakarawan Nasseur as a "seductive exhortation as she [slid] around the notes with loose, microtonal languor, creating a thick fog that’s intoxicating and startling in equal measure". During this time he was also described as "a hard bop bassist of some distinction". As an oud player he did a tour of South America for the United States Department of State and performed at an African jazz festival in Morocco.

With the advent of free jazz in the 1960s, Abdul-Malik transitioned from Arabic-inspired music to predominantly jazz ballads and the blues and recorded his album The Music of Ahmed Abdul-Malik. His instruments on this album included the Korean piri. In 1961, Abdul-Malik sat in with John Coltrane; his playing of the tambura on "India" was released on Coltrane's The Complete 1961 Village Vanguard Recordings decades later.

Abdul-Malik visited Nigeria late in 1961 and developed a better foundation of its music and culture. This influenced his album Sounds of Africa the following year, which included trumpet, saxophones, and percussionists. In 1963, Abdul-Malik returned to his original recording style with his recording of The Eastern Moods of Ahmed Abdul-Malik. His trio recorded music that was influenced by sounds from the Middle East, North Africa, and India. His final album as a leader, Spellbound, was recorded in 1964. Rather than focusing on Middle Eastern and African music, Abdul-Malik recorded a more traditional album with a focus on the oud, showing that the oud could be used in American jazz.

After his last two albums failed to achieve monetary success, Abdul-Malik switched to focusing on teaching the next generation of jazz musicians in his local community and later at New York University. In 1984, he received BMI's Pioneer in Jazz Award for introducing Middle Eastern music into jazz. After having a stroke in the 1980s, he stopped working at New York University and returned to studying, including under oud player Simon Shaheen, until Abdul-Malik died as the result of another stroke in Long Branch, New Jersey in 1993.

== Discography ==
=== As leader ===
- 1958: Jazz Sahara (Riverside) with Johnny Griffin
- 1959: East Meets West (RCA Victor)
- 1961: The Music of Ahmed Abdul-Malik (New Jazz)
- 1962: Sounds of Africa (New Jazz)
- 1963: The Eastern Moods of Ahmed Abdul-Malik (Prestige)
- 1964: Spellbound (Status) with Ray Nance and Seldon Powell

=== As sideman ===
With Walt Dickerson

- Relativity (New Jazz, 1962)
- Jazz Impressions of Lawrence of Arabia (Dauntless, 1963)

With Earl Hines

- 'Fatha': The New Earl Hines Trio (1964 [1965])
- The Real Earl Hines (1964 [1965])

With Odetta

- Sometimes I Feel Like Cryin' (RCA Victor, 1962)
- Odetta and the Blues (Riverside, 1962)
- Odetta Sings the Blues (Riverside, 1968)

With Herbie Mann

- Herbie Mann at the Village Gate (Atlantic, 1961)
- Herbie Mann Returns to the Village Gate (Atlantic, 1961 [1963])

With Thelonious Monk

- Misterioso (Riverside, 1958)
- Thelonious in Action (Riverside, 1958)
- Live at the Five Spot: Discovery! (Blue Note, 1958 [1993])
- Thelonious Monk Quartet with John Coltrane at Carnegie Hall (Blue Note, 1957 [2005])

With Randy Weston

- With These Hands... (Riverside, 1956)
- Jazz à la Bohemia (Riverside, 1956)
- The Modern Art of Jazz by Randy Weston (Dawn, 1956 [1957])
- Tanjah (Polydor, 1973 [1974])

With others

- Art Blakey: The African Beat (Blue Note, 1962)
- John Coltrane: The Complete 1961 Village Vanguard Recordings (Impulse!, 1961 [1997])
- Jutta Hipp: Jutta Hipp with Zoot Sims (1956 [1957])
- Ken McIntyre: Year of the Iron Sheep (United Artists, 1962)
- Dave Pike: Limbo Carnival (New Jazz, 1962 [1963])
