= Ann Richards (singer) =

American pop and jazz singer (1935–1982)

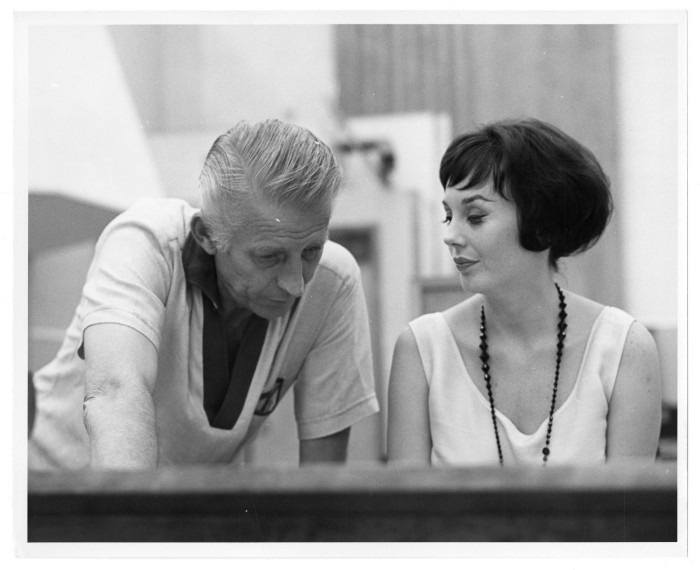
- Ann Richards with Stan Kenton at Capitol Studios in Hollywood, 1960

Background information
- Born: Margaret Ann Borden; October 1, 1935; San Diego, California, U.S.
- Died: April 1, 1982 (aged 46) Los Angeles, California, U.S.
- Genres: Jazz; traditional pop
- Occupation: Singer
- Instrument: Vocals
- Years active: 1954–1982
- Labels: Capitol; Atco; Vee-Jay

Ann Richards (née Margaret Ann Borden, October 1, 1935 – April 1, 1982) was an American pop and jazz singer. She was the second wife of bandleader Stan Kenton. She had a short career in the late 1950s and early 1960s.

== Early life, musical education and influences ==
Ann Richards was born Margaret Ann Borden on October 1, 1935, in San Diego, California, but raised to the north in Albany, California. Her father William left the family after Ann's mother had an affair and child with one of her students. By 1940, her mother Bernice was divorced and Ann's mother's maiden name of Richards was adopted. Her mother taught school and also wanted her daughter to become a teacher. Richards' mother gave Ann piano lessons and discovered Ann could sing at the age of 15. In nearby Oakland, Richards babysat for Judy Davis, who was the later vocal coach of Judy Garland, Barbra Streisand and Frank Sinatra. She tended after Davis's children in exchange for vocal lessons. Unbeknownst to her mother, Richards would go out late at night to sing in clubs, getting experience in the bay area as a jazz and pop singer.

== Tour with Charlie Barnet and Hollywood ==
Early in 1954, Richards moved into a young women's residence in San Francisco and studied for three months at San Francisco State University to be a teacher. That same year, band leader Charlie Barnet heard Richards at the El Patio Ballroom in San Francisco and hired her for a five-month tour as his band's primary female singer. Shortly after the tour with Barnett, she moved to Hollywood.

On Thanksgiving of 1954, Richards sang at the La Madelon restaurant on the Sunset Strip. Notable songwriters Joe Greene and Eddie Beal were in attendance that evening and were so impressed with Richards' performance that they booked her to record a demo. Shortly after, Greene and Beal played the finished demo for Stan Kenton, with whom they'd had numerous successful collaborations, as well as for Pete Rugolo. Kenton contacted Richards and hired her as his new singer the day they met in his office on Robertson Blvd. Ann Richards recalled, "He (Stan) asked me one question: What do you want to do with your career? I said, 'Mr. Kenton, if I had a choice of singing with Guy Lombardo and making lots of money or making sixty bucks a week singing jazz, I'd rather spend the rest of my life singing jazz.' He said, 'Okay, you're hired.'" Much like when June Christy had begun working with Kenton 10 years earlier at 19 years of age, Richards was starting at this age with the Kenton organization in 1955, coming in after singer Chris Connor, who left the band in 1953. Richards had long aspired to be a part of the Kenton musical legacy and fame.

== Stan Kenton and Capitol Records ==
Very shortly after joining the Kenton organization, Richards would record her first tracks with the orchestra on January 25, March 30 and May 15, 1955, at Capitol Studios in Hollywood. The sessions were scheduled to highlight her, with several pop singles produced from those dates, including "A-Ting-A-Ling", "Freddy"/"Winter In Madrid" and "The Handwriting's on the Wall". Her initial recordings never produced the hits Kenton was looking for at the time.

The most notable and mature of these initial 1955 singles with Kenton come from a July 22, 1955, session: Richards sings two Bill Holman arrangements of the standards "Black Coffee" and "The Thrill Is Gone", recorded at Universal Studios in Chicago. During that first summer with the Kenton organization, she would make a notable July 26 appearance on the CBS summer television broadcast Music '55. Burt Korall of Metronome magazine heard the Stan Kenton Orchestra at Birdland in New York City and praised Richards as the band's new "big commercial asset", noting her jazz feeling, intonation and star quality. By October 1955, Down Beat magazine named her the "best female band singer of the year."

Initially, most of the romantic time Richards spent with Kenton was while they were touring, and not always to the approval of the band. Kenton took Richards out on a first date to Glenn Wallichs' house in Beverly Hills to view a television pilot of Music '55, which sparked the romance between Richards and Kenton. Richards married Kenton shortly thereafter, on October 18, 1955, in Detroit. Ironically, the two newlyweds would buy Wallichs' home at the time of their marriage to raise a family. Richards' appearances on Kenton's LP releases for Capitol Records began with Kenton with Voices (1957), where she is a featured soloist on three tracks, including vocalese scatting on Gene Roland's Opus in Chartreuse.

I really think that he wanted a brood mare. He wanted a new life again, with children and all that. And I was young, and I wanted children. So I sorta lit that spark for him. A rebirth kinda thing. And really, it worked that way for a while.

— Ann Richards

In the late 1950s, shortly after the birth of the couple's two children, Richards was again regularly touring with the Kenton orchestra. (She had flown back to the U.S. in the middle of the UK tour, due to stress during pregnancy). From February 7 to April 19, 1958, she performed on weekends with Kenton at Balboa. During that time, Kenton helped her secure a recording contract with Capitol. The record label supported her exclusively, featuring Richards on two high exposure releases backed by full studio orchestra. She was paired with conductor Brian Farnon and arranger Warren Barker for her debut album, I'm Shooting High (1958). The Many Moods of Ann Richards was then recorded with Capitol and released in 1960, with music arranged by Bill Holman, Ralph Carmichael and Tak Shindo. Shindo's Japanese folk style arrangement of Jerome Moross's "Lazy Afternoon" is especially notable for Richards, which, according to James Gavin of Jazz Times, featured her "vocal beauty and dramatic flair." In 1960, Richards was featured at Carnegie Hall with the Kenton orchestra and also appeared on Steve Allen’s NBC-TV show.

Recorded at Capitol in July 1960, Two Much! was released in 1961, featuring Ann Richards with the Stan Kenton orchestra. Noted as the highlight of her recording career, she is backed by arrangements from Bill Holman, Johnny Richards and Gene Roland. In a glowing review of Two Much!, Billboard Music Week magazine predicted Richards would take her place amongst past Kenton singing stars such as Anita O'Day, June Christy, and Chris Connor.

By August 1961, Richards' personal and professional relationship with Kenton came to a quick end after she posed for Playboy magazine and concurrently signed a contract with Atco Records without Kenton's knowledge. The cover of her 1961 Atco release Ann, Man! was taken from her June 1961 Playboy photo shoot.

== 1962–1982 ==
By 1962, Richards was in demand at jazz clubs all over the country, including Playboy Clubs, due to her pictorial in the magazine. Her Atco release, Ann, Man!, was an album of bluesy, sexual songs, backed by trumpeter Jack Sheldon and guitarist Barney Kessel.

In 1963, Richards continued to have professional success, opening for George Shearing on a tour of Japan. In June 1963, she appeared on the syndicated Ray Anthony Show as a featured artist. That same year, she obtained a regular singing engagement at the Losers jazz club in Hollywood. Her next release was a live album recorded for Vee-Jay Records, Live...at "The Losers". It sold disappointingly. As rock & roll grew in popularity, singers like Richards were becoming passé. In March 1964, Richards appeared as a musical guest on The New Steve Allen Show. In 1965, she had a brief cameo as a bar patron in Angel's Flight, a lesser known B-movie for which she also sang the title song. After this time, her singing career never regained the traction she enjoyed in the late 1950s and early 1960s.

By the mid-'70s, Richards had become the resident singer in the lounge of the upscale Hotel Bel-Air in Los Angeles, backed by pianist Bud Herrmann. Film critic Rex Reed said that "She performed half a set seated at my table, with a mic in one hand and a scotch in the other", adding that she "sang like a dream." Her last major singing tour was in Japan in December 1981. She had lost her regular singing engagement at the Hotel Bel-Air after coming home from Japan and was in serious financial straits due to her second husband's financial dealings.

== Personal life ==
On October 18, 1955, Richards married Stan Kenton. Soon after, they had two children: Dana Lynn and Lance. Richards was only 20 years of age at the time and 23 years Kenton's junior. In 1961, after six years of marriage, they separated and eventually divorced.

In 1961, Richards posed for a nude layout in Playboy magazine's June 1961 issue. She signed a contract to record with Atco without her husband's knowledge. The Playboy shoot was also done without Kenton's knowledge; he found out about it while playing at the Aragon Ballroom in Chicago when handed the magazine by Charles Suber, who was the publisher of Down Beat magazine at the time. Kenton then filed for divorce from Richards in August 1961. Kenton won custody of their two children and Richards agreed to a settlement of $50,000 and declined alimony. Her divorce money bought her a small house in the Hollywood Hills. Eventually she took a secretarial job to augment her singing income in the mid-1960s. According to Kenton's third wife, Jo Ann Hill, he was secretly sending Richards checks in order to help with her living expenses.

In late 1978, she married her second husband, Bill Botts (Frederick William Botts Jr.). She had been introduced to him through her pianist, Bill Marx. By 1980, the two were separated. Richards struggled with drug and alcohol problems until her death in April 1982.

In 1980, her son, Lance Kenton, was sentenced to a year in jail and three years' probation in a high-profile case in Los Angeles for helping to put a rattlesnake in the mailbox of lawyer Paul Morantz. Morantz had handled a successful civil suit against the controversial drug rehabilitation organization Synanon. Kenton was a member of the Imperial Marines, Synanon's internal security force.

== Death and controversy ==
Richards was found dead on April 1, 1982, at her home in the Hollywood Hills, her death ruled a suicide by the Los Angeles Police Department. Her estranged husband during that time, Bill Botts, found the body.

Richards' death is still considered controversial. There was a bullet wound in Richards' right temple with a rifle lying close by in the room. A letter was also there, seemingly written by Richards, which discussed the singer's depression. The police read it as a suicide note, although according to her daughter, Dana Kenton, it voiced no clear motive for the death.

When visiting the house after the body had been removed, Kenton found cocaine and marijuana that had been planted in the house, which were later revealed to be fake. Both Dana and Lance Kenton pushed for a further investigation with the LAPD, but were unsuccessful. Due to connections with insurance policies on Richards' life, Botts has been suspected to be involved, though this claim is unsubstantiated.

Later, Richards' close friend Ted Sitterley requested the police report but was turned down. The LAPD currently lists the police report as unavailable and perhaps destroyed. Botts later appeared to claim his share of Richards' estate; she had left no will. "We argued all the way down to a vacuum cleaner," Dana Kenton said. "He took my mom for every penny she had."

In 1982 her friend Donna Shore organized a memorial for Richards at Carmelo's Jazz Club in Sherman Oaks, California. Albert Marx, Jack Sheldon, Lou Levy, and Bill Henderson paid tribute.

== Discography ==
- Kenton with Voices with Stan Kenton (Capitol, 1957)
- I'm Shooting High (Capitol, 1958)
- The Many Moods of Ann Richards (Capitol, 1960)
- Two Much! (Capitol, 1961)
- Ann, Man! (Atco, 1961)
- Live...at "The Losers" (Vee-Jay, 1963)
- I Hear Music (Total Recording, 1993)

== Film and television ==
- Music 55 (1955)
- Hideout in the Sun (1960)
- The Ray Anthony Show (1963)
- The New Steve Allen Show (1964)
- Angel's Flight (1965)
