= Bob Keene =

American football player (1919–2010)

Profile
- Position: Back

Personal information
- Born: August 26, 1919; Detroit
- Died: March 20, 2010 (aged 90)
- Listed height: 5 ft 10 in (1.78 m)
- Listed weight: 185 lb (84 kg)

Career information
- High school: Mackenzie (Detroit, Michigan)
- College: Detroit

Career history
- Detroit Lions (1943–1945)

Career statistics
- Games: 16
- Stats at Pro Football Reference

Robert Keene (August 26, 1919 – March 20, 2010) was an American football player.

A native of Detroit, Keene attended Mackenzie High School and played college football at the University of Detroit.

He played professional football in the National Football League (NFL) for the Detroit Lions during the 1943, 1944, and 1945 seasons. He appeared in 16 NFL games, three as a starter, and totaled 29 rushing yards and 118 receiving yards.
