= Johnny Richards =

American jazz arranger and composer (1911–1968)

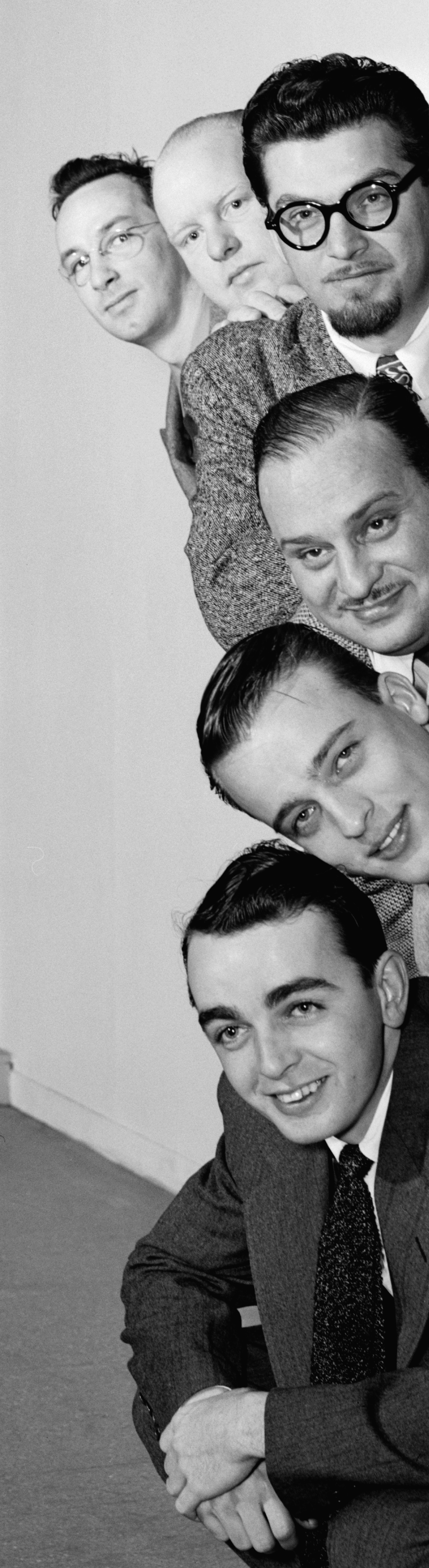
- Clockwise from left: Eddie Sauter, Edwin Finckel, George Handy, Richards, Neal Hefti, and Ralph Burns at the Museum of Modern Art, New York, c. 1947

Background information
- Born: Juan Manuel Cascales; November 2, 1911; Querétaro, Mexico
- Died: October 7, 1968 (aged 56) New York City, U.S.
- Genres: Jazz
- Occupations: Composer, arranger

Johnny Richards (born Juan Manuel Cascales, November 2, 1911 – October 7, 1968) was an American jazz arranger and composer scoring numerous sound tracks for television and film. He was a pivotal composer/arranger for cutting edge, adventurous performances and recording sessions by Stan Kenton's big band in the 1950s and early 1960s; such as Cuban Fire!, Kenton's West Side Story and Adventures in Time.

== Biography ==
Richards was born in Toluca, Mexico, to a Spanish father (Juan Cascales y Valero) and a Mexican mother (Maria Celia Arrue aka Marie Cascales), whose parents were Spanish immigrants to Mexico. He entered the United States on August 4, 1919 at Laredo, Texas, along with his mother, three brothers (also professional musicians) and sister:

Siblings:

- Jose Luis Cascales (Joe)
- Carlos Guillermo Cascales (known in the music world as Chuck Cabot)
- Maria de los Angeles Cascales (Angeles/Anne Beaufait)
- Juan Adolfo Cascales (Jack; 1918–1975), played double bass

Richards' father, Juan Cascales y Valero, immigrated earlier, crossing the border at Laredo, Texas, on June 4, 1919. The family lived first in Los Angeles, California and later in San Fernando, California, where Joe, Johnny, and Chuck attended and graduated from San Fernando High School. In 1930, Richards was living in Fullerton, California, and attending Fullerton College.

Richards worked in Los Angeles, California, from the late 1930s to 1952. In 1952, he moved to New York City. He had been arranging for Stan Kenton since 1950 and continued to do so through the mid-1960s. He also led his own bands throughout his career. In addition, he wrote the music for the popular song "Young at Heart" (1953), made famous by Frank Sinatra and others.

Richards died October 7, 1968, in New York City, of a brain tumor. Reviewers have deemed his style as being influenced by Duke Ellington and Pete Rugolo.

== Discography ==
=== As leader ===
- Annotations of the Muses (Légende, 1955)
- Something Else by Johnny Richards (Bethlehem, 1956)
- Wide Range (Capitol, 1957)
- Experiments in Sound (Capitol, 1958)
- The Rites of Diablo (Roulette, 1958)
- Walk Softly/Run Wild! (Coral, 1959)
- My Fair Lady – My Way (Roulette, 1964)
- Aqui Se Habla Español (Roulette, 1967)
- Mosaic Select 17 (Mosaic, 2005)

=== As sideman/arranger ===
With Charlie Barnet

- The Capitol Big Band Sessions (Capitol, 1948–1950)

With Harry James

- Harry James and His Orchestra 1948–49 (Big Band Landmarks – Vol. X & XI, 1969)

With Stan Kenton

- Cuban Fire! (Capitol, 1956)
- Back to Balboa (Capitol, 1958)
- Two Much! (Capitol, 1960) with Ann Richards
- Kenton's West Side Story (Capitol, 1961)
- Adventures in Time (Capitol, 1962) as composer arranger and conductor

With Hugo Loewenstern

- Who Said Good Music Is Dead? (Jazz Art Spectacular LP 1103, 1965)

== See also ==
- List of jazz arrangers
