= Tak Shindo =

American musician, composer, arranger, and bandleader (1922–2002)

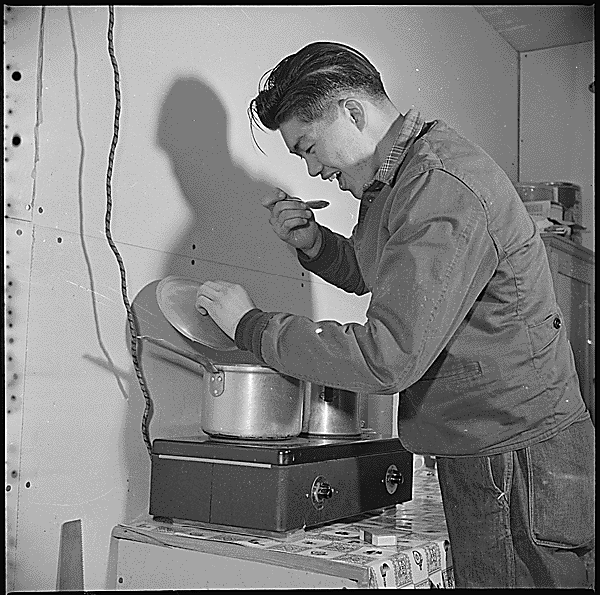
- Shindo at the Manzanar Relocation Center, c. 1943

Background information
- Born: November 11, 1922; Sacramento, California
- Died: April 17, 2002 (aged 79) San Dimas, California
- Genres: Exotica, space age pop, lounge music, Japanese music
- Occupations: Musician, composer, arranger
- Instruments: Clarinet, koto
- Years active: 1957–1967
- Labels: Capitol, Mercury, Edison International, Imperial, Nippon Victor

Takeshi "Tak" Shindo (Japanese: 進藤 武, November 11, 1922 – April 17, 2002) was an American musician, composer and arranger. He was one of the prominent artists in the exotica music genre during the late 1950s and early 1960s. Shindo also founded a dance band in 1947 and was a frequent lecturer and writer on Japanese music. He first gained prominence for his work on the 1957 motion picture Sayonara, served as the musical director for the television series Gunsmoke, and composed theme music for The Ed Sullivan Show and Wagon Train. He is most remembered for the exotica albums he released from 1958 to 1962, including Mganga! The Primitive Sounds of Tak Shindo (1958), Brass and Bamboo (1959) and Accent on Bamboo (1960). He also released several albums in Japan during the mid-1960s that blended American and Japanese musical traditions. During the 1950s and 1960s, Shindo was a columnist for the Rafu Shimpo covering classical and popular music. In 1980, Shindo made a documentary film, Encounter with the Past, about the Manzanar relocation camp where he was relocated in 1942 as part of the Japanese American internment policy.

== Early years and television work ==
Shindo was born in 1922 in Sacramento, California. He moved with his family to Los Angeles in 1927. He enrolled at Los Angeles State College in 1941, but he was relocated to the Manzanar Relocation Center in early 1942 as part of the Japanese American internment policy that was adopted after the outbreak of war between the United States and Japan. Shindo spent more than two years at Manzanar. While at Manzanar, he worked as a reporter for the Manzanar Free Press and developed his interest in music. Music professor W. Anthony Sheppard, who published an article on Shindo and his music in 2005, concluded that, had it not been for his internment at Manzanar, Shindo would most likely have become an electrical engineer. Sheppard observed:

While he had some musical experience, he had just begun college before Pearl Harbor and had no thoughts of pursuing music as a career. ... Shindo performed in one of the camp orchestras and took advantage of the camp's musical education program. Most significantly for his later career, he also took correspondence courses in orchestration.

Shindo enlisted in the U.S. Army in 1944 and served as a Japanese language instructor in the Military Intelligence Service at Fort Snelling, Minnesota. While at Fort Snelling, he also continued his correspondence courses in music and became an arranger for the Nisei Eager Beavers band.

Following the war, Shindo studied music at Los Angeles State College and studied jazz composition at the American Operatic Laboratory school. He also formed a dance band in 1947, which he continued to operate for more than 25 years. In a 1947 interview, Shindo discussed the multi-ethnic composition of his band: "As long as a player can produce good music, that's all I'm interested in. My band is supposed to be Japanese-American. But besides the four Nisei on it, I have Jewish, Negro, Russian, Irish, and Mexican-American boys on it. And we have a swell time together."

Shindo received his bachelor's degree in 1951 from Los Angeles City College and subsequently studied under film composer Miklós Rózsa at the University of Southern California. Early in his career, Shindo worked on several television series, including service as the musical director for Gunsmoke and Suspense. He also composed theme music for The Ed Sullivan Show, Wagon Train, and Adventure.

== Japanese music ==
Shindo also collected Japanese instruments and wrote and lectured on Japanese music. In the late 1950s and 1960s, Shindo was frequently called on by Hollywood film and television productions to serve as a technical consultant on projects incorporating Japanese music and themes. In his article on Shindo, Professor Sheppard noted: "Shindo suddenly found the mainstream spotlight shining on him in the late 1950s as the representative of Japanese musical culture in Hollywood film and television." He first gained general notoriety for his work as technical adviser for the music in the 1957 motion picture, Sayonara. Shindo was charged with blending Japanese and western musical influences, using Japanese instruments and a mixed choral group of 38 voices of which 16 were female Japanese and four were male Japanese. Ron Burton, in an article distributed by the United Press, wrote of Shindo's work on the film: "The movie is being regarded as a vehicle that will create a demand for Japanese music in this country and do much to give the Western world a better understanding of Japanese culture." Shindo added, "An important part of what this picture is doing for an understanding of Japanese culture comes from the music. We have, of course, adapted it for the occidental ear."

Shindo later recalled that his work on Sayonara opened up numerous opportunities for him. He noted that "the whole thing just lined up one after the other ... it just rode and rode to the point I couldn't keep up with it anymore." Other projects in which Shindo was asked to consult (or compose) include Cinerama Seven Wonders of the World (1955), Stopover Tokyo (1957), Escapade in Japan (1957), Gunsmoke (1957), Wagon Train (1958, composer for episode titled "The Sakae Ito Story"), Studio One (1958, composer/director of "The Kurushiki Incident"), Cry for Happy (1961), and A Majority of One (1962).

== Recording artist ==
Album cover for Shindo's 1958 debut

Shindo is most remembered for the albums he recorded featuring a mix of eastern and western musical styles and instrumentation. Jazz composer and critic Leonard Feather named Shindo as a "Giant of Jazz" in the fifteenth article in Feather's series on the "giants of jazz." His albums won favor with listeners of music in the exotica genre that also included artists Martin Denny, Les Baxter, Arthur Lyman and Chaino. The popularity of exotica peaked in 1959 as Denny's album "Exotica" spent five weeks at No. 1 on the Billboard album chart and was the No. 3 album of the year according to Billboard. Shindo later recalled what attracted him to the style: "Everyone is looking for a style. So in my case, I decided being Oriental, I had something I should draw upon and so I decided to go 'exotic sound.'"

=== Mganga! The Primitive Sounds of Tak Shindo ===
Shindo's 1958 debut album, Mganga! The Primitive Sounds of Tak Shindo, was his first foray into the exotica genre. The album explores the primal rhythms of African music with influences from Afro-Cuban jazz. It also features animal sounds and chants to create an exotic, fantasy feel. Music critic Jason Ankeny described Mganga! as "vibrant and intoxicating, with a rhythmic intensity quite uncommon for its era. For an artificial experience, it packs a genuine wallop." Mganga! has been called "Shindo's orchestral fantasy of Africa" and is probably the best known of his albums in the exotica genre.

=== Brass and Bamboo ===
In late 1959, Shindo's album Brass and Bamboo was released by Capitol Records. The album featured 10 standards and two original compositions by Shindo, combining the sounds of traditional Japanese instruments, including koto, shamisen, and bamboo flutes, with Western brass with "orchestration in tempos and moods that range from ballads to swing." The fanfare drums used in the recording were borrowed from the Tenrikyo Church in Los Angeles, and musicians from the Los Angeles Philharmonic Orchestra contributed a Chinese gong acquired on a trip to Hong Kong. At the time of the album's release, Shindo said: "It . . . introduces a foreign sound to the American ear. Oriental instruments have been used for solo passages in record before, but as far as I know this is the first time they have ever been an integral part of the arrangements." One reviewer rated it as the "Album of the Month" for April 1960, calling it a "sparkling debut" with "a new, refreshing blend of music of the East and West, big band dance arrangements spiced with exotic instrumental sounds of the orient." Esquire magazine in 1960 wrote: "Tak mixes ancient Eastern and modern Western instruments in a steamy dance sukiyaki." Another reviewer wrote that "the music is neither Oriental nor jazz, but a delightful, different sound" providing "nothing but fun for stereo fanciers." Writing for allmusic.com, Richard Pierson wrote that Shindo's "skillful arrangements of big band chestnuts and Hollywood theme tunes achieved a blend that was witty, cosmopolitan, and almost immediately outmoded as the ascendancy of rock and its youth market turned American pop music into an arena of generational identity politics."

=== Rod McKuen's "Yellow Unicorn" ===
Shindo also gained positive reviews for his instrumental work on Rod McKuen's 1960 album, Yellow Unicorn. One reviewer wrote: "Also on this record is some exciting music by Tak Shindo: Behind this music's fragility there is great emotional power. It's Japanese in antecedent one supposes. If you're too young to have this record stir memories, perhaps it will stimulate you into washing out your gym clothes and going out to look the world over."

=== Accent on Bamboo ===
"Accent on Bamboo" album cover

In his 1960 album, Accent on Bamboo, Shindo minimized the Japanese musical elements in favor of "largely straightforward big-band arrangements." The album's liner notes observe that "this well-arranged meeting of East and West is a swinging thing, and Oriental too – but scrutable."

Shindo's albums drew attention for their cover art as well as the music. Music professor W. Anthony Sheppard has written that the covers of Brass and Bamboo and Accent on Bamboo are both divided "into two utterly different racial/musical realms." One half of the covers features a Caucasian woman "presented as sexually sophisticated and modern as she appears caressing and surrounded by phallic instruments," while the other half features a Japanese woman dressed in a kimono "demurely holding their instruments and representing an alternative form of sensuality."

Accent on Bamboo was requested by Capitol Records as a follow-up to the success of Brass and Bamboo and Shindo was asked to complete the follow-up album within 30 days. Accent on Bamboo did not achieve the same level of commercial success as its predecessor, and Capitol informed Shindo in March 1961 that it would not renew his contract.

=== Far East Goes Western ===
Shindo's 1962 album, Far East Goes Western, was produced by Quincy Jones. The album "use[d] oriental instruments to show how universal such American songs as "Wagon Wheels" and "San Antonio Rose" can be."

=== Sea of Spring and Nippon Victor recordings ===
Shindo's Sea of Spring, released in 1966, was one of several recorded in Japan for the Nippon Victor label in Japan in 1966. The album features traditional Japanese folk melodies with eastern and western instrumentation. In his review for allmusic.com, Jason Ankeny calls it "clearly the most appealing and imaginative album of the bunch ... A beautiful, thoughtful album, free of kitsch and irony." His other albums for the Nippon Victor label included "Mood in Japan" (1964) and "Midnight in San Francisco" (1966).

== Later years ==
Shindo joined the faculty at California State University, Los Angeles in the mid-1960s. His work, "Impressions for Piano and Strings," premiered at Cal State Los Angeles in 1967. In 1970, Shindo received a master's degree in Asian Studies from the University of Southern California. He was the arranger and director for the grand opening of the Japanese Pavilion at EPCOT Disney in 1979, the same year that he retired from Cal State LA. In 1980, he released a documentary film, "Encounter with the Past," about the Manzanar relocation camp.

Shindo's albums received renewed attention in the 1990s with the revival of interest in exotica and ultra lounge music. Shindo died in 2002 at San Dimas, California at age 79.

== Discography ==
Original LPs

- Martin Denny, "Primitiva" (1958, Liberty LRP-3087) – Shindo played koto on Denny's album
- Tak Shindo, "Mganga! Primitive Sounds" (1958, Edison International 100)
- Tak Shindo, "Brass and Bamboo" (1959, Capitol ST-1345)
- Rod McKuen, "The Yellow Unicorn" (1960, Imperial LP 12036)
- Paul Mark and His Orchestra, "East to West" (1961, Imperial LP 9120/LP 12057)
- Paul Mark and His Orchestra and Voices, "Golden Melodies from Japan: (1961, Imperial LP 9161/LP 12075)
- Tak Shindo, "Accent on Bamboo" (1961, Capitol T-1433)
- Tak Shindo, "Far East Goes Western" (1962, Mercury PPS 2031)
- Hiroshi Watanabe's Star Dust Orchestra, "Mood in Japan" (1964, Nippon Victor) - Arranger
- Tak Shindo, "Midnight in San Francisco" (1966, Nippon Victor)
- Tak Shindo, "Sea of Spring" (1966, Nippon Victor)

== Film and television credits ==
- "Tokyo Joe," (1949, Columbia Pictures) – uncredited assistant composer
- "Cinerama Seven Wonders of the World" (1955, Warner-Adventure) – composer
- "Sayonara" (1957, Warner Bros.) – technical supervisor music (uncredited assistant composer)
- "Stopover Tokyo" (1957) – music supervisor, Japanese music
- "Escapade in Japan" (1957, RKO Pictures) – uncredited assistant composer
- "Gunsmoke" (1957, CBS television) – music supervisor for several episodes
- "Wagon Train" (1958, NBC television) – composer for episode titled The Sakae Ito Story
- Studio One (1958, CBS television) – composer/director of "The Kurushiki Incident"
- "Cry for Happy" (1961, Columbia Pictures) – arranger and uncredited assistant composer
- "A Majority of One" (1962, Warner Bros.) – uncredited assistant composer
- "Geisha Fantasy" (1962) – arranger for show at Las Vegas Desert Inn
- "Japan: A New Dawn Over Asia – Japan in the 20th Century" (1965, TV documentary) – composer
- "Encounter with the Past" (documentary, 1980)
- "Siegfried and Roy Superstar" (1983) – composer for show at Las Vegas Stardust Hotel

== See also ==
- Exotica
- Lounge music
