= A Presentation of Progressive Jazz =

Studio album by Stan Kenton and His Orchestra
- Released: 1948
- Recorded: June 7, 1946 – March 20, 1951
- Studio: Radio Recorders, Hollywood, CA and RKO-Pathé Studios, NYC
- Genre: Jazz
- Label: Capitol CD 79
- Producer: Lee Gillette

Stan Kenton chronology
Encores (1947)	A Presentation of Progressive Jazz (1948)	Innovations in Modern Music (1950)

A Presentation of Progressive Jazz is a 1948 jazz album by pianist and bandleader Stan Kenton.

== Background ==
The album features performances recorded in 1947 and originally released on the Capitol label as four 78 rpm discs, reissued as a 10-inch LP in 1953 as A Concert in Progressive Jazz, and then as a 12-inch LP in 1955 with additional tracks.

== Track listing ==
All compositions by Pete Rugolo and Stan Kenton except where noted.

1. "Cuban Carnival" (Pete Rugolo) – 2:44
2. "Monotony" – 3:04
3. "Lonely Woman" (Benny Carter, Ray Sonin) – 3:25
4. "Lament" (Rugolo) – 3:03
5. "Thermopolae" (Robert Graettinger) – 2:50 Additional track on 12-inch LP
6. "Theme for Alto" (Rugolo) – 2:35 Additional track on 12-inch LP
7. "Impressionism" (Rugolo) – 3:01
8. "Elegy for Alto" – 3:10
9. "This Is My Theme" (Rugolo, Kenton, Audrey Lacey) – 3:16
10. "Fugue for Rhythm Section" (Rugolo) – 2:57
11. "Introduction to a Latin Rhythm" – 2:41 Additional track on 12-inch LP
12. "Come Rain or Come Shine" (Harold Arlen, Johnny Mercer) – 3:15 Additional track on 12-inch LP

Note

- Recorded at Radio Recorders in Hollywood, CA on June 7, 1946 (track 12), September 24, 1947 (track 8), September 25, 1947 (track 10), October 20, 1947 (track 2), October 22, 1947 (tracks 4 & 7) and March 20, 1951 (track 6) and at RKO-Pathé Studios in New York City on December 6, 1947 (tracks 1, 3 & 5), December 21, 1947 (track 11) and December 22, 1947 (track 9)

== Personnel ==
- Stan Kenton – piano, conductor
- Alfred "Chico" Alvarez, John Anderson (track 12), Buddy Childers (tracks 1–5 & 7–12), Maynard Ferguson (track 6), Ken Hanna (tracks 1–5 & 7–12), John Howell (track 6), Al Porcino (tracks 1–5 & 7–12), Shorty Rogers (track 6), Ray Wetzel – trumpet
- Milt Bernhart (tracks 1–11), Eddie Bert (tracks 1–5 & 7–11), Harry Betts (tracks 1–11), Bob Fitzpatrick (track 6), Harry Forbes (tracks 1–5 & 7–11), Milt Kabak (track 12), Dick Kenney (track 6), Miff Sines (track 12), Kai Winding (track 12) – trombone
- John Halliburton (track 6), Bart Varsalona (tracks 1–5 & 7–12) – bass trombone
- Al Anthony (track 12), Boots Mussulli (track 12), Frank Pappalardo (tracks 2, 8 & 10), Art Pepper (tracks 1, 3–7, 9 & 11), Bud Shank (track 6), George Weidler (tracks 1–5 & 7–11) – alto saxophone
- Bart Caldarell (track 6), Bob Cooper, Vido Musso (track 12), Warner Weidler (tracks 1–5 & 7–11) – tenor saxophone
- Bob Gioga – baritone saxophone
- Pete Rugolo – piano (track 12)
- Laurindo Almeida (tracks 1–5 & 7–11) – guitar
- Don Bagley (track 6), Eddie Safranski (tracks 1–5 & 7–12) – bass
- Shelly Manne – drums
- Jack Costanzo – bongos (tracks 1–5 & 7–11)
- Carlos Vidal – congas (tracks 1 & 11)
- José Mangual – timbales, cowbell (track 1)
- Salvador Armenta (track 2), Machito (tracks 1 & 11), Rene Touzet (track 4) – maracas
- June Christy – vocals (tracks 3, 9 & 12)
- Robert Graettinger (track 5), Pete Rugolo (tracks 1–4 & 6–12) – arranger
