= Stan Kenton Classics =

Compilation album by Stan Kenton and His Orchestra
- Released: 1952
- Recorded: May 20, 1944 – December 22, 1947; Hollywood, California, Chicago, Illinois and New York City
- Genre: Jazz
- Label: Capitol H/T 248

Stan Kenton chronology
Stan Kenton's Milestones (1943–47)	Stan Kenton Classics (1952)	Artistry in Rhythm (1946)

Stan Kenton Classics is an album by pianist and bandleader Stan Kenton compiling performances recorded between 1945 and 1947 and originally collected on the Capitol label as a 10-inch LP in 1950 then reissued as a 12-inch LP with additional tracks in 1955.

== Reception ==
Professional ratings
Review scores
Source	Rating
Allmusic	4.5/5 stars

The Allmusic site awarded the album 4 1/2 stars.

== Track listing ==
All compositions by Stan Kenton except where noted.

1. "Tampico" (Allan Roberts, Doris Fisher) – 2:37
2. "Artistry in Boogie" (Pete Rugolo, Stan Kenton) – 3:00
3. "Southern Scandal" – 3:07
4. "Machito" (Rugolo) – 2:27
5. "After You" (Seger Ellis) – 3:01 Additional track on 12-inch LP
6. "Harlem Holiday" – 2:34 Additional track on 12-inch LP
7. "And Her Tears Flowed Like Wine" (Kenton, Charles Lawrence, Joe Greene) – 3:08
8. "Minor Riff" (Rugolo, Kenton) – 3:07
9. "Across the Alley from the Alamo" (Greene) – 2:38
10. "Unison Riff" (Rugolo) – 3:12
11. "There Is No Greater Love" (Isham Jones, Marty Symes) – 3:04 Additional track on 12-inch LP
12. "How High The Moon" (Morgan Lewis, Nancy Hamilton) – 2:30 Additional track on 12-inch LP
- Recorded at C.P. MacGregor Studios in Hollywood, California on May 20, 1944 (track 7), Universal Recording Studios, Chicago, Illinois on May 4, 1945 (tracks 1 & 3), at Radio Recorders in Hollywood, California on June 4, 1946 (track 2), February 13, 1947 (track 4) February 28, 1947 (tracks 9 & 11) March 31, 1947 (track 8) and October 22, 1947 (track 10), at RKO-Pathé Studios, New York City on January 2, 1947 (track 5), December 21, 1947 (track 12) and December 22, 1947 (track 6).

== Personnel ==
- Stan Kenton – piano, conductor
- Alfred "Chico" Alvarez (tracks 2, 4–6 & 8–12), John Anderson (tracks 1–5, 8, 9 & 11), John Carroll (tracks 1, 3 & 7), Buddy Childers, Karl George (track 7), Mel Green (tracks 1 & 3), Ken Hanna (tracks 2, 4–6 & 8–12), Dick Morse (track 7), Al Porcino (tracks 6, 10 & 12), Gene Roland (tracks 1 & 3), Ray Wetzel (tracks 2, 4–6 & 8–12) – trumpet
- Bill Atkinson (track 7), Milt Bernhart (tracks 4–6 & 8–12), Eddie Bert (tracks 6, 10 & 12), Harry Betts (tracks 6, 10 & 12), George Faye (track 7), Harry Forbes (tracks 4–12), Milt Kabak (tracks 1–3), Skip Layton (tracks 4, 5, 8, 9 & 11), Marshall Ocker (tracks 1 & 3), Miff Sines (track 2), Kai Winding (tracks 2–5, 8, 9 & 11), Freddie Zito (tracks 1 & 3) – trombone
- Bart Varsalona – bass trombone
- Al Anthony (track 2), Chester Ball (track 7), Eddie Meyers (tracks 4, 5, 7–9 & 11), Bob Lively (tracks 1 & 3), Boots Mussulli (tracks 1–5, 8, 9 & 11), Art Pepper (tracks 6 & 10), George Weidler (tracks 6 & 10) – alto saxophone
- Bob Cooper (tracks 2, 4–6 & 8–12), Red Dorris (track 5), Stan Getz (track 7), Dave Madden (tracks 1 & 3), Joe Magro (tracks 1 & 3), Dave Matthews (track 7), Vido Musso (tracks 2, 4, 8, 9 & 11), Warner Weidler (tracks 6, 10 & 12) – tenor saxophone
- Maurice Beeson (track 7), Bob Gioga (tracks 1–6 & 8–12) – baritone saxophone
- Bob Ahern (tracks 1–5, 7–9 & 11), Laurindo Almeida (tracks 6, 10 & 12) – guitar
- Pete Rugolo – piano (track 2)
- Gene Englund (track 7), Eddie Safranski (tracks 2, 4–6 & 8–12), Max Wayne (tracks 1 & 3) – bass
- Shelly Manne (tracks 2, 4–6 & 8–12), Jesse Price (track 7), Bob Varney (tracks 1 & 3) – drums
- Jack Costanzo – bongos (tracks 6, 10 & 12)
- June Christy (tracks 1, 9 & 12), Anita O'Day (track 7) – vocals
- The Pastels – vocal group (tracks 5 & 11)
  - Margaret Dale
  - Dave Lambert
  - Wayne Howard
  - Jerry Packer
  - Jerry Duane
- Buddy Baker (track 7), Stan Kenton (tracks 3, 6), Gene Roland (track 1), Pete Rugolo (tracks 2, 4, 5, 8–12) – arranger
