= Kenton in Hi-Fi =

Kenton in H-Fi

Studio album by Stan Kenton
- Released: 1956
- Recorded: February 11 & 12, 1956
- Studio: Goldwyn Studios, Hollywood, CA
- Genre: Jazz
- Label: Capitol W/SW 724
- Producer: Lee Gillette

Stan Kenton chronology
Contemporary Concepts (1955)	Kenton in H-Fi (1956)	Cuban Fire! (1956)

Kenton in Hi-Fi is an album by bandleader and pianist Stan Kenton featuring performances of Kenton's signature compositions from the 1940s recorded in 1956 and released on the Capitol label. This album was re-released as 'Kenton in Stereo' in 1959. A 7-1/2 i.p.s.stereo reel tape - Catalog no. ZDS -10 - was recorded by Capitol and released in 1956. Apparently the stereo mix for the reel tape is unique, but the same stereo master tape was probably used for the stereo vinyl LP record.

== Reception ==
Professional ratings
Review scores
Source	Rating
Allmusic	4/5 stars
The Penguin Guide to Jazz Recordings	3.5/4 stars

The Allmusic review by Stephen Cook noted "Thanks to a seamless mix of dazzling charts and liberal doses of Lunceford and Ellington-inspired swing, the marriage certainly works on Kenton in Hi-Fi. Old hits like "Eager Beaver" and "Artistry In Boogie" sparkle in the warm glow of '50s stereo technology, while fiery renditions of "Lover" and "The Peanut Vendor" show the famous muscle of the Kenton band. ...one can see why this album was not only one of Kenton's most popular releases, but a critical success as well".

== Track listing ==
All compositions by Stan Kenton except where noted.

1. "Artistry Jumps" - 2:38
2. "Interlude" (Pete Rugolo) - 3:06
3. "Intermission Riff" (Ray Wetzel) - 4:15
4. "Minor Riff" (Rugolo, Kenton) - 3:03
5. "Collaboration" (Rugolo, Kenton) - 2:40
6. "Painted Rhythm" - 3:04
7. "Southern Scandal" - 3:06
8. "The Peanut Vendor" (Moises Simons) - 4:36
9. "Eager Beaver" - 3:24
10. "Concerto to End All Concertos" - 7:04
11. "Artistry in Boogie" (Rugolo, Kenton) - 2:38
12. "Lover" (Richard Rodgers, Lorenz Hart) - 2:33
13. "Unison Riff" (Rugolo) - 3:11

== Personnel ==
- Stan Kenton - piano, conductor
- Pete Candoli, Maynard Ferguson, Ed Leddy, Sam Noto, Don Paladino - trumpet (tracks 1 & 3–13)
- Milt Bernhart, Bob Fitzpatrick, Carl Fontana, Kent Larsen - trombone
- Don Kelly - bass trombone
- Skeets Herfurt, Lennie Niehaus - alto saxophone (tracks 1 & 3–13)
- Vido Musso, Bill Perkins, Spencer Sinatra - tenor saxophone (tracks 1 & 3–13)
- Jack Nimitz - baritone saxophone (tracks 1 & 3–13)
- Ralph Blaze - guitar
- Don Bagley - bass
- Mel Lewis - drums
- Frank “Chico” Guerrero - timbales, bongos (tracks 8 & 13)
- John Palladino - recording engineer
- Stan Kenton (tracks 1 & 6–9), Pete Rugolo (tracks 2, 4, 5 & 10–13), Ray Wetzel (track 3) - arranger
