= Contemporary Concepts =

Studio album by Stan Kenton
- Released: 1955
- Recorded: July 20 & 22, 1955
- Studio: Universal Studios, Chicago, IL
- Genre: Jazz
- Label: Capitol T 666
- Producer: Bob Martin, Bill Putnam

Stan Kenton chronology
Duet (1955)	Contemporary Concepts (1955)	Kenton in Hi-Fi (1956)

Contemporary Concepts is an album by pianist and bandleader Stan Kenton with featuring performances of jazz standards recorded in 1955 and released on the Capitol label.

== Reception ==
Professional ratings
Review scores
Source	Rating
Allmusic	3/5 stars

The Allmusic review by Scott Yanow noted "The music swings well (with drummer Mel Lewis pushing the rhythm section) and such talented soloists as altoists Charlie Mariano and Lennie Niehaus, tenor-saxophonist Bill Perkins, trombonist Carl Fontana, and trumpeters Sam Noto and Stu Williamson are well-featured. Nothing all that innovative occurs but this accessible set should be of interest to fans of bop".

== Track listing ==
1. "What's New?" (Bob Haggart, Johnny Burke) - 5:43
2. "Stella by Starlight" (Victor Young, Ned Washington) - 5:11
3. "I've Got You Under My Skin" (Cole Porter) - 5:30
4. "Cherokee" (Ray Noble) - 3:06
5. "Stompin' at the Savoy" (Benny Goodman, Chick Webb, Edgar Sampson, Andy Razaf) - 4:36
6. "Yesterdays" (Jerome Kern, Otto Harbach) - 5:37
7. "Limelight" (Gerry Mulligan) - 3:08
8. "Sunset Tower" (Stan Kenton) - 3:11 *bonus track on CD
9. "Opus in Chartreuse" (Gene Roland) - 2:33 *bonus track on CD
10. "Opus in Turquoise" (Gene Roland) - 2:54 *bonus track on CD
11. "Opus in Beige" (Gene Roland) - 2:26 *bonus track on CD

== Personnel ==
- Stan Kenton - piano, conductor
- Bobby Clark, Ed Leddy, Sam Noto, Al Porcino, Stu Williamson - trumpet
- Gus Chappell, Bob Fitzpatrick, Carl Fontana, Kent Larsen - trombone
- Don Kelly - bass trombone
- Charlie Mariano, Lennie Niehaus - alto saxophone
- Bill Perkins, David van Kriedt - tenor saxophone
- Don Davidson - baritone saxophone
- Ralph Blaze - guitar
- Max Bennett - bass
- Mel Lewis - drums
- Bill Holman (tracks 1–6), Gerry Mulligan (track 7) - arranger
