= Ray Wetzel =

American jazz trumpeter (1924–1951)

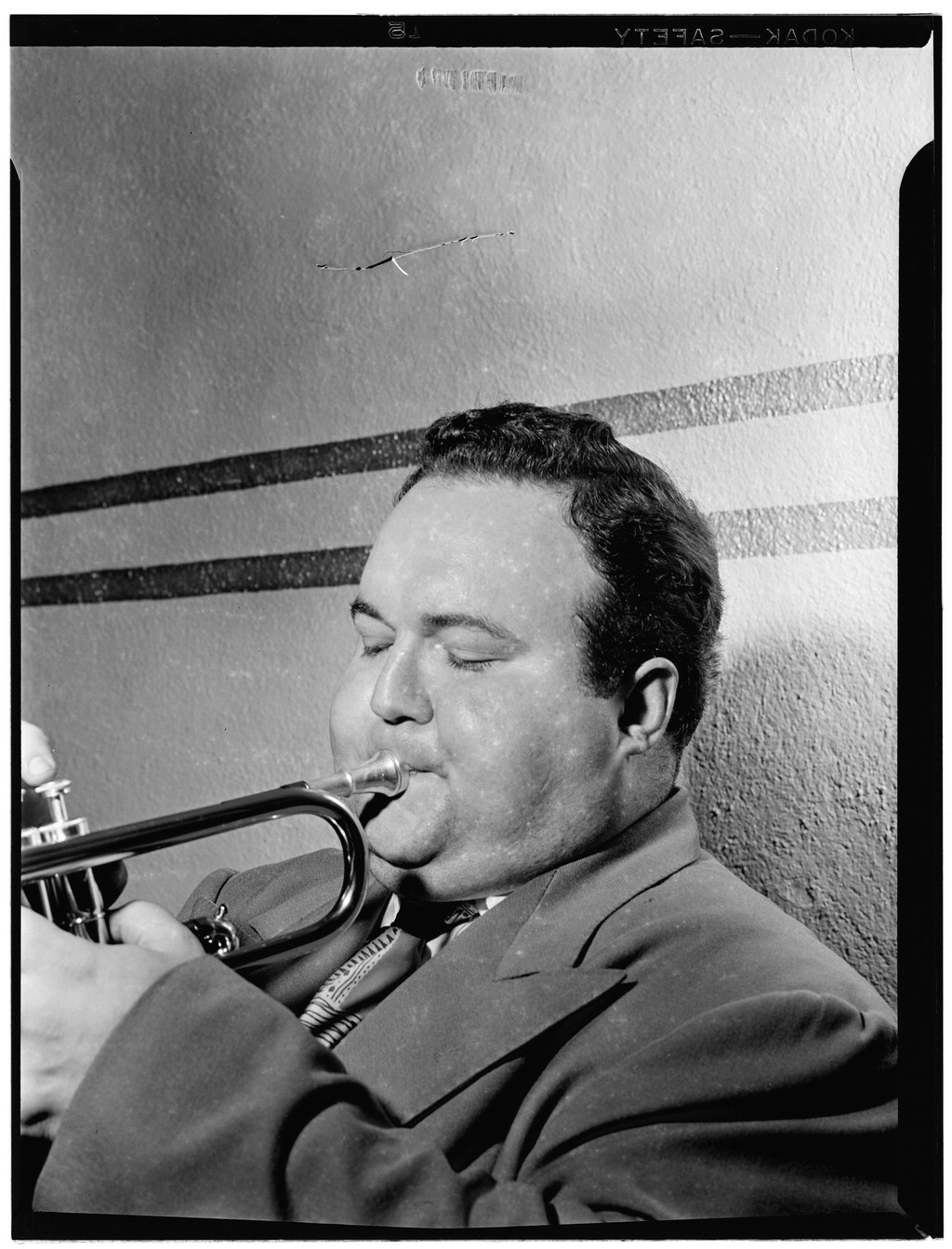

Background information
- Born: September 22, 1924
- Died: August 17, 1951 (aged 26)
- Genre: Jazz
- Occupation: Musician
- Instrument: Trumpet
- Years active: 1943–1951

Ray Wetzel (September 22, 1924 – August 17, 1951) was an American jazz trumpeter. Critic Scott Yanow described him as "greatly admired by his fellow trumpeters".

== Career ==
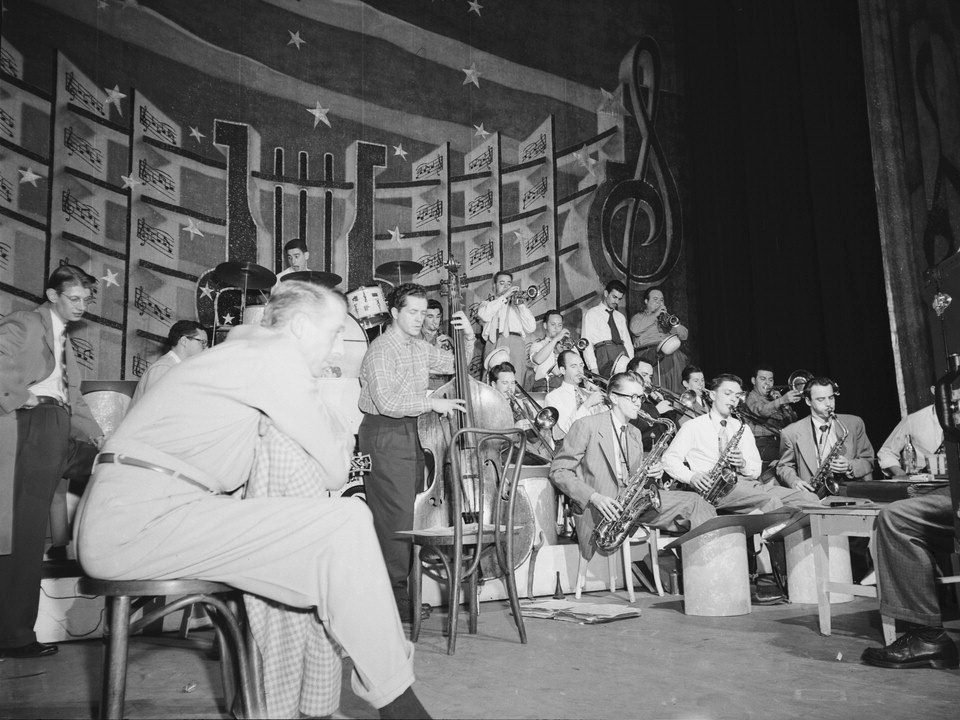
Stan Kenton, Eddie Safranski, Shelly Manne, Chico Alvarez, Buddy Childers, Ray Wetzel, Harry Betts, Bob Cooper, and Art Pepper, 1947 or 1948

Wetzel played lead trumpet for Woody Herman from 1943 to 1945 and for Stan Kenton from 1945 to 1948. He recorded in 1947 with the Metronome All-Stars, Vido Musso, and Neal Hefti, and married bass player Bonnie Addleman in 1949. While with the Charlie Barnet Orchestra in 1949, he played trumpet alongside Maynard Ferguson, Doc Severinsen, and Rolf Ericson. He played with his wife in Tommy Dorsey's ensemble in 1950 and with Kenton again in 1951.

While touring with Dorsey in 1951, he was killed in a car crash at the age of 26. He never recorded as a leader. He is credited with composing the Stan Kenton tune 'Intermission Riff'.

== Discography ==
With Stan Kenton

- Artistry in Rhythm (Capitol, 1946)
- Encores (Capitol, 1947)
- A Presentation of Progressive Jazz (Capitol, 1947)
- Stan Kenton's Milestones (Capitol, 1950)
- Stan Kenton Classics (Capitol, 1952)
- Popular Favorites by Stan Kenton (Capitol, 1953)
- The Kenton Era (Capitol, 1955)
