= Cuban Fire! =

Studio album by Stan Kenton
- Released: Cuban Fire! -1956 original LP -1991 re-issue CD
- Recorded: May 22–24, 1956 in New York City (original LP); September 19–21, 1960 in Los Angeles (extra re-issued material on CD)
- Genre: Jazz, big band, Latin jazz, Afro-Cuban music
- Length: 54:00
- Label: Capitol
- Producer: Lee Gillette (LP); Ted Daryll (CD reissue)

Stan Kenton chronology
Kenton in Hi-Fi (1956)	Cuban Fire! (1956)	Kenton with Voices (1957)

Cuban Fire! is an album by Stan Kenton and his orchestra released in 1956 by Capitol Records. This was Stan Kenton's big band's first full-length recording of Afro-Cuban-styled music. The LP charted for four weeks in Billboard starting on September 15, 1956, peaking at #17. The concept of the original 1956 recording centers on the Cuban Fire! suite Kenton had commissioned from composer Johnny Richards. The 1991 CD re-issue is augmented with one extra track from the 1956 sessions and five cuts recorded four years later by the first of Kenton's mellophonium orchestras.

== Background and composition ==
Though Stan Kenton had recorded earlier hits such as The Peanut Vendor in 1947 with Latin percussionist Machito, as well as many other Latin flavored singles, the Cuban Fire! suite and LP stands as a watershed set of compositions for Johnny Richards' career and an outstanding commercial/artistic achievement for the Kenton orchestra, and a singular landmark in large ensemble Latin jazz recordings. "The reason we (i.e Kenton) made CUBAN FIRE! is interesting. We had recorded a lot of Afro-Cuban music, and a lot of the Latin guys around New York complained: 'It's wrong, you're not writing the music correctly.'" Stan Kenton then asked composer Johnny Richards (long time staff arranger for Kenton) to write an authentic Latin “suite” that would abide by all the rules many Afro-Cuban musicians had complained about.

Of all the writers in the Kenton stable of names, Richards was the best suited for the task of creating such music for the Kenton orchestra. Richards was bilingual (Spanish/English) and was born in Toluca, Mexico as Juan Manuel Cascales; his parents were Spanish immigrants to Mexico. Richards was to hang around with the Cuban-Hispanic musicians of New York for months before starting the suite. This was a much more personal endeavor for Richards than it was for any of the possible Kenton writers. “CUBAN FIRE is completely authentic, the way it combines big-band jazz with genuine Latin-American rhythms.”" The recording is a musical triumph for both Kenton and Richards; it comes at a time when big bands and jazz were slowly eclipsed by the pop music of Elvis Presley and emerging rock n' roll. The success of the Cuban Fire! album can be gauged in part by the immediate ascent of Johnny Richards' star after its release; he was suddenly offered a contract by Bethlehem Records to record what would be the first of several recordings with his own groups.

== Recording ==
The original LP and recording sessions were completed on a highly compressed timeline. Before the first notes of Recuerdos and Fuego Cubano where recorded on May 22, 1956, Kenton and his orchestra had been on a two-month tour of Europe (set sail back from Cherbourg, France to New York on May 10) with only having looked at "El Congo Valiente" beforehand. The band had less than a week to prepare while in New York. While the great majority of the personnel for the LP was on tour, Richards had taken great care to meticulously rehearse the suite with the Latin percussionists who would be added for three days of recording.

Though the listing for the liner notes contains six trumpets, only five are called for in Richards' scores. Due to the 'heavy lifting' the music required for the brass section, a rotation of trumpet players was utilized on the sessions. A discarded part of the suite entitled "Alma Pecadora" (Soul of a Sinner) with the heading "Cuban Fire Suite" had been rejected due to quality issues as compared to the other movements. "Tres Corazones" (three hearts) is recorded on May 24 as the last of the three days but never makes it on the Cuban Fire! LP pressing; it does appear on a later Kenton LP release for Capitol Records in 1965. (disputed as to this cut being a part of the suite).

=== Soloists ===
Soloists are abundant on the original recording of the Cuban Fire! suite; the most interesting of them being the tenor saxophonist Lucky Thompson. The Thompson tenor solos on the second half of "Fuego Cubano" and the up tempo "Quien Sabe" are a new addition and contrast to the normal style and harmonic/melodic practices of known Kenton tenor sidemen Bill Perkins, Zoot Sims, and later Bill Trujillo. Along with the addition of Thompson, jazz musicians including Carl Fontana, Lennie Niehaus, Sam Noto, and Mel Lewis are prominent in solo spots adding to the status of the dates. Thompson and Curtis Counce (bass) on the Cuban Fire! sessions (and previous tour) serve as positive credits in the dispelling of myth about Kenton having racist tendencies towards the hiring of sidemen.

== CD reissue ==
The tracks on the Cuban Fire! CD numbered 8–12 are an interesting set of recordings from a time of change for the Kenton orchestra beginning in 1960. These, along with two other recorded tracks, were intended to comprise an entirely fresh Stan Kenton LP release for Capitol Records later that year from the newly formed mellophonium orchestra. While the mellophoniums helped to bridge the sonic gap in the middle range between trombones and trumpet, they were volatile in terms of tuning and reliability (even with the best players). Both Johnny Richards and long time Kenton staff composer Gene Roland are the primary writers and conductors for these later recording dates (Kenton himself writes "Midnight Tales" for the project, which was never released); neither staff writer made musical accommodations when writing for the new instrument. The whole project was ditched after 11 frustrating hours of recording, only producing 26 minutes of usable music.

Oddly, Johnny Richards' Wagon (On The Wagon) is one of the most interesting tracks on the 1991 re-issue and was originally issued on a Kenton compilation LP from the 1970s by Capitol Records years after the band had gone with Creative World Records (Kenton's own label). Kenton was greatly criticized over the years for having bands that did not swing like the bands of Woody Herman, Count Basie, or Duke Ellington. This one track composed by Richards (one of only two swing, non-Afro Latin cuts from the CD) proves wrong any doubts about the Kenton band being able to compete against the aforementioned bands. The alto saxophone solo by Gabe Baltazar on Wagon is formidable and a real highlight of his tenure with Kenton; easily comparable to solos of earlier alto players with the band such as Lee Konitz, Lennie Niehaus, or Charlie Mariano. Ironically, the once maligned fledgling mellophonium band (and poor tuning) is later praised for its 'imposing testimony' on Richards' first scores for the group.

In 1960 Kenton also has the instrumentation of the sax section changed to alto/tenor/tenor/baritone/baritone or bass saxophone creating a much more robust lower end to the band. The sax section make-up would stay the same until the band disbanded after Kenton's passing in the late 1970s (mellophoniums were discarded by the middle 1960s). The trombone section is also transformed to have tuba anchoring the brass. The first Kenton mellophonium band was a far more symphonic sounding group than earlier versions or periods of the Kenton orchestra. The initial September 1960 sessions function to work through the orchestration and sonic problems presented by such a wide variety and number of instruments being recorded live in the studio.

== Release and reception ==
Professional ratings
Review scores
Source	Rating
Billboard	positive
The Penguin Guide to Jazz	3/4 stars
Down Beat	3.5/5 stars
Allmusic	4.5/5 stars
Chicago Tribune	negative

The Billboard Magazine sales tracking reported considerable commercial success during the period of release of the original LP issue. Critical reception was also positive, as evidenced by reviews from Down Beat and other music periodicals during 1956. AllMusic's Scott Yanow described the album as "one of Stan Kenton's more memorable concept albums of the 1950s". Stuart Broomer described the album as "admirable" and highlighted the "excellent solo contributions" and the "extraordinary precision and energy" by the musicians. In contrast, Jack Fuller writing for the Chicago Tribune considered the album "bombastic and tame", comparing the music to that of popular bandleader Xavier Cugat. Upon hearing the album for the first time, bandleader and timbalero Tito Puente described it as "strong and brash", noting its progressive style.

== Track listing ==
All tracks are written by Johnny Richards (original LP) and all others except Gene Roland for track #10 and Stan Kenton for #12.

No.	Title	Length
1.	"Fuego Cubano (Cuban Fire)"	6:02
2.	"El Congo Valiente (Valiant Congo)"	5:53
3.	"Recuerdos (Reminiscences)"	5:01
4.	"Quien Sabe (Who Knows)"	4:49
5.	"La Guera Baila (The Fair One Dances)"	5:09
6.	"La Suerte de los Tontos (Fortune of Fools or Fools Luck)"	4:20
7.	"Tres Corazones (Three Hearts)"	2:59
8.	"Malibu Moonlight (Sonatine)"	3:51
9.	"El Panzon"	4:34
10.	"Carnival (Carnival Square)"	5:21
11.	"Wagon (original score entitled "On The Wagon")"	3:05
12.	"Early Hours (Lady Luck)"	2:56
Total length:		54:00

- Tracks 1–6 comprised the original Capitol T-731, Cuban Fire! LP (1956)
- Track 7 is first issued on Capitol T-20244 (UK), Fabulous Alumni of Stan Kenton LP (1963)
- Track 8 & 9 are first issued on Creative World ST-1066, Kenton By Request Vol. 5 LP (1972)
- Track 10 is first issued on Creative World ST-1040, Kenton By Request Vol. 2 LP (1966)
- Track 11 is first issued on Capitol, M-11027, Capitol Jazz Classics Vol. 2: Stan Kenton LP (1972)
- Track 12 is first issued on Creative World ST-1069, Kenton By Request Vol. 6 LP (1990)

== Recording sessions ==
- May 22–24, 1956 in New York City at the Riverside Plaza Hotel

Tracks 1–7 (in mono)

These were recorded in the three days of sessions in New York but "Tres Corazones" was not included as part of the suite on the original Cuban Fire! LP at the behest of Johnny Richards.

- September 19–21, 1960 in Hollywood CA at Capitol Tower Studios

Tracks 8–12 (in stereo)

Gene Roland's "Ten Bars Ago" was recorded on Sept. 21 and has been re-issued on the 4 CD set Stan Kenton Retrospective - The Capitol Years (1992, Blue Note Records, ASN B000ULGNUU)

Stan Kenton's "Midnight Tales" was also recorded on Sept. 21 but has never been issued.

== Personnel ==
=== Musicians ===
==== May 22–24, 1956 ====
- Piano, Conductor – Stan Kenton
- Alto saxophone – Lennie Niehaus
- Tenor saxophone – Bill Perkins, Lucky Thompson
- Baritone saxophone – Bill Root
- Trumpet – Al Mattaliano, Ed Leddy, Lee Katzman, Phil Gilbert, Sam Noto, Vinnie Tanno
- French Horn – Irving Rosenthal, Julius Watkins
- Trombone – Bob Fitzpatrick, Carl Fontana, Don Kelly, Kent Larsen
- Tuba – Jay McAllister
- Guitar – Ralph Blaze
- Bass – Curtis Counce
- Drums – Mel Lewis
- Timpani – George Gaber, Saul Gubin
- Maracas – Mario Alvarez
- Bongos – Willie Rodriguez
- Claves – Roger Mozian
- Timbales – George Laguna
- Congas – Tommy Lopez

==== September 19–21, 1960 ====
- Piano, Conductor – Stan Kenton
- Conductors – Johnny Richards, Gene Roland
- Alto saxophone – Gabe Baltazar
- Tenor saxophone – San Donahue, Paul Renzi
- Baritone saxophone – Marvin Holladay
- Baritone saxophone, bass saxophone– Wayne Dustan
- Trumpet – Bud Brisbois, Dalton Smith, Sam Noto, Bob Rolfe, Steve Huffsteter, Johnny Audino (Audino first two days only, cuts 8–11)
- Mellophonium – Dwight Carver, Joe Burnett, Bill Horan, Tom Wirtel - and Gene Roland (Roland solos only on Early Hours)
- Trombone – Dick Hyde, Ray Sikora
- Bass trombone – Jim Amlotte, Bob Knight
- Tuba – Albert Pollan
- Bass – Pete Chivily
- Drums – Art Anton
- Bongos/congas – George Acevedo

=== Technical ===
- Producer: Lee Gillette
- Re-issue (CD) producer: Ted Daryl
- Digital transfers (CD): Jay Ranellucci and Joe Brescio
- Design (CD): Franko Caligiuri/Ink Well, Inc.
- Liner notes (CD): Ted Daryl
