= Encores (Stan Kenton album) =

Studio album by Stan Kenton and His Orchestra
- Released: 1949
- Recorded: October 30, 1945 – December 22, 1947
- Studio: Radio Recorders, Hollywood, CA and RKO-Pathé Studios, NYC
- Genre: Jazz
- Label: Capitol CC 113
- Producer: Lee Gillette

Stan Kenton chronology
Artistry in Rhythm (1946)	Encores (1949)	A Presentation of Progressive Jazz (1947)

Encores is an album by pianist and bandleader Stan Kenton featuring performances recorded in 1945–47 and originally released on the Capitol label as three 78 rpm discs in 1949, reissued as a 10-inch LP in 1950, and then as a 12-inch LP in 1955 with additional tracks.

== Reception ==
Professional ratings
Review scores
Source	Rating
Allmusic	3/5 stars

The Allmusic review by Scott Yanow observed "None of the selections are considered classics but most (particularly "Painted Rhythm," "Capitol Punishment" and "Abstraction") should delight Kenton collectors".

== Track listing ==
All compositions by Pete Rugolo and Stan Kenton except where noted.

1. "Peg o' My Heart" (Alfred Bryan, Fred Fisher) – 3:36
2. "He's Funny That Way" (Neil Moret, Richard A. Whiting) – 3:14
3. "Capitol Punishment" – 4:32
4. "Painted Rhythm" (Kenton) – 2:55 Additional track on 10-inch LP
5. "Journey to Brazil" – 3:01 Additional track on 12-inch LP
6. "Lover" (Richard Rodgers, Lorenz Hart) – 2:44 Additional track on 10-inch LP
7. "Somnambulism" (Ken Hanna) – 3:09
8. "Abstraction" – 3:08
9. "Chorale for Brass, Piano and Bongo" – 3:05
10. "Please Be Kind" (Saul Chaplin, Sammy Cahn) – 2:59 Additional track on 12-inch LP
11. "Ecuador" (Gene Roland) – 2:42 Additional track on 12-inch LP

Note

- Recorded at Radio Recorders in Hollywood, CA on October 30, 1945 (track 4), June 7, 1946 (tracks 1 & 2), July 18, 1946 (track 11), February 27, 1947 (track 3), March 31, 1947 (track 6), April 1, 1947 (track 10), September 24, 1947 (track 9), September 25, 1947 (track 8) and at RKO-Pathé Studios in New York City, NY on December 21, 1947 (track 5), December 22, 1947 (track 7)

== Personnel ==
- Stan Kenton – piano, arranger
- Alfred "Chico" Alvarez (tracks 1–3 & 5–11), John Anderson (tracks 1–4, 6, 10 & 11), Russ Burgher (track 4), Buddy Childers, Ken Hanna (tracks 1–3 & 5–11), Bob Lymperis (track 4) Al Porcino (tracks 5 & 7–9), Ray Wetzel – trumpet
- Milt Bernhart (tracks 3 & 5–10), Eddie Bert (tracks 5 & 7–9), Harry Betts (tracks 5 & 7–9), Harry Forbes (tracks 3 & 5–10), Skip Layton (tracks 3, 6 & 10), Milt Kabak (tracks 1, 2, 4 & 11), Jimmy Simms (track 4), Miff Sines (tracks 1, 2, 4 & 11), Kai Winding (tracks 1–3, 6 10 & 11), Freddie Zito (track 4) – trombone
- Bart Varsalona – bass trombone
- Al Anthony (tracks 1, 2, 4 & 11), Boots Mussulli (tracks 1–4, 6, 10 & 11), Eddie Meyers (tracks 3, 6 & 10), Frank Pappalardo (tracks 8 & 9), Art Pepper (tracks 5 & 7), George Weidler (tracks 5 & 7–9) – alto saxophone
- Bob Cooper, Vido Musso (tracks 1–4 & 6, 10 & 11), Warner Weidler (tracks 5 & 7–9) – tenor saxophone
- Bob Gioga – baritone saxophone
- Pete Rugolo – piano (track 2)
- Bob Ahern (tracks 1–4, 6, 10 & 11), Laurindo Almeida (tracks 5 & 7–9) – guitar
- Eddie Safranski – bass
- Ralph Collier (track 4), Shelly Manne (tracks 1–3 & 5–11) – drums
- Jack Costanzo – bongos (tracks 5 & 7–9)
- Carlos Vidal – congas (track 5)
- Frank "Machito" Grillo – maracas (track 5)
- June Christy – vocals (tracks 2 & 10)
- Ken Hanna (track 7), Stan Kenton (track 4), Gene Roland (track 11), Pete Rugolo (tracks 1–3, 5, 6 & 8–10) – arranger
