= Stan Kenton's Milestones =

Compilation album by Stan Kenton and His Orchestra
- Released: 1950
- Recorded: 19 November 1943 – December 22, 1947
- Studio: C.P. MacGregor Studios (Hollywood, CA); Radio Recorders (Hollywood); RKO-Pathé Studios (NYC)
- Genre: Jazz
- Label: Capitol H/T 190
- Producer: Dave Dexter and Lee Gillette

Stan Kenton chronology
Stan Kenton's Milestones (1950)	Artistry in Rhythm (1947)

Stan Kenton's Milestones is an album by pianist and bandleader Stan Kenton compiling performances recorded between 1943 and 1947 and originally collected on the Capitol label as a 10-inch LP in 1950 then reissued as a 12-inch LP with additional tracks in 1955.

== Reception ==
Professional ratings
Review scores
Source	Rating
Allmusic	4/5 stars

The Allmusic review by Scott Yanow said "This music is essential in one form or another" and noted "These performances are still exciting a half-century later".

== Track listing ==
All compositions by Stan Kenton except where noted.

1. "Artistry in Rhythm" – 3:20
2. "Eager Beaver" – 3:11
3. "Collaboration" (Pete Rugolo, Stan Kenton) – 2:41
4. "The Peanut Vendor" (Moisés Simons) – 2:45
5. "Interlude" (Rugolo) – 3:09 Additional track on 12 inch LP
6. "Bongo Riff" (Rugolo) – 2:08 Additional track on 12 inch LP
7. "Intermission Riff" (Ray Wetzel) – 3:18
8. "Concerto to End All Concertos" – 6:19
9. "Artistry Jumps" – 2:40
10. "Theme to the West" (Rugolo, Kenton) – 3:12 Additional track on 12 inch LP
11. "How Am I to Know" (Jack King, Dorothy Parker) – 2:47 Additional track on 12 inch LP
- Recorded at C.P. MacGregor Studios in Hollywood, CA on November 19, 1943 (tracks 1 & 2), at Radio Recorders in Hollywood, CA on October 30, 1945 (track 9), January 14, 1946 (track 7), July 26, 1946 (track 8), February 28, 1947 (tracks 3 & 11) and September 25, 1947 (track 10) and at RKO–Pathé Studios, NYC on December 6, 1947 (track 4), December 22, 1947 (track 5 & 6)

== Personnel ==
- Stan Kenton – piano, conductor
- Alfred "Chico" Alvarez (tracks 3, 4, 6, 8, 10 & 11), John Anderson (tracks 3, 7–9 & 11), Ray Borden (tracks 1 & 2), Russ Burgher (tracks 7 & 9), John Carroll (tracks 1 & 2), Buddy Childers (tracks 1–4 & 6–11), Karl George (tracks 1 & 2), Ken Hanna (tracks 3, 4, 6, 8, 10 & 11), Bob Lymperis (tracks 7 & 9), Dick Morse (tracks 1 & 2), Al Porcino (tracks 4, 6 & 10), Ray Wetzel (tracks 3, 4 & 6–11) – trumpet
- Milt Bernhart (tracks 3–6, 10 & 11), Eddie Bert (tracks 4–6 & 10), Harry Betts (tracks 4–6 & 10), George Faye (tracks 1 & 2), Harry Forbes (tracks 1–6, 8, 10 & 11), Milt Kabak (tracks 7 & 9), Ray Klein (track 7), Skip Layton (tracks 3 & 11), Jimmy Simms (track 9), Miff Sines (track 8), Kai Winding (tracks 3, 8 & 11), Freddie Zito (tracks 7 & 9) – trombone
- Bart Varsalona – bass trombone
- Al Anthony (tracks 7–9), Eddie Meyers (tracks 1–3 & 11), Boots Mussulli (tracks 3, 7–9 & 11), Frank Pappalardo (track 10), Art Pepper (tracks 1, 2, 4 & 6), George Weidler (tracks 4, 6 & 10) – alto saxophone
- Maurice Beeson (tracks 1 & 2), Bob Cooper (tracks 3, 4 & 6–11), Red Dorris (tracks 1 & 2), Vido Musso (tracks 3, 7–9 & 11), Warner Weidler (tracks 4 6 & 10) – tenor saxophone
- Bob Gioga – baritone saxophone (tracks 1–4 & 6–11)
- Bob Ahern (tracks 1–3, 7–9 & 11), Laurindo Almeida (tracks 4–6 & 10) – guitar
- Eddie Safranski (tracks 3–11), Clyde Singleton (tracks 1 & 2) – bass
- Shelly Manne (tracks 3–11), Joe Vernon (tracks 1 & 2) – drums
- Jack Costanzo – bongos (tracks 4–6 & 10)
- René Touzet – maracas (track 4)
- Stan Kenton (tracks 1, 2, 8 & 9), Ken Hanna (track 11), Pete Rugolo (tracks 3, 5, 6 & 10) – arranger
