= Ken Hanna =

American jazz musician

Ken Hanna was the first guy I ever met, even before Rugolo, who had the same feeling as me. Ken came to a rehearsal and we hadn’t played more than 16 bars when I realized he wrote exactly as I did, and I couldn’t believe it.

— Stan Kenton, Steven D. Harris "The Kenton Chronicles" p. 233.

Kenneth Lucien Hanna (July 8, 1921 - December 10, 1982) was an American jazz trumpeter, arranger, composer, and bandleader, best known for his work with Stan Kenton. Hired in 1942 by Kenton to add commercial arrangements to the library, he also played trumpet in the band before taking a break for military service. He returned to the trumpet section after the war and continued to contribute compositions and arrangements until 1951. He wrote almost 40 forward thinking compositions and arrangements between 1942 and 1951. He returned to the Kenton writing staff in the late 1960s, contributing over 70 more titles between 1968 and 1977.

Hanna was born in Baltimore. He married Margaret Lee Voorhess (1919–1968), with whom he had a son, Donald Voorhess Hanna (1942–2019), and Stephen Charles Hanna (1947–2020), in 1942.

== Discography ==
=== As leader ===
- 1955 Jazz for Dancers

=== As sideman ===
With Stan Kenton

- Stan Kenton's Milestones (Capitol, 1943–47 [1950])
- Stan Kenton Classics (Capitol, 1944–47 [1952])
- Artistry in Rhythm (Capitol, 1946)
- Encores (Capitol, 1947)
- A Presentation of Progressive Jazz (Capitol, 1947)
- The Kenton Era (Capitol, 1940–54, [1955])
- Uncollected Stan Kenton & His Orchestra, Vol. 5 (1945–1947) (1994)
- City of Glass: Stan Kenton Plays Bob Graettinger (1995)

With others

- 2001 1947–1949, Nat King Cole
- 2002 Cool Christy, June Christy
- 2002 Those Kenton Days, Art Pepper
- 2003 Summit Meetings 1939–50, The Metronome All-Stars
- 2003 Young Art, Art Pepper
- 2008 Nellie's Nightmare, Buddy Rich

== Arrangements & compositions created for Kenton ==
+ indicates original composition

=== Early years: 1942-1951 ===
- April In Paris (1947) The Pastels vocal arranged by Dave Lambert
- Atlanta G.A. (1946) June Christy vocal
- Begin the Beguine (1944)
- Black and Blue (1950) Jay Johnson vocal
- Build It Up, Paint It Nice, Tear It Down (1944) Anita O’Day vocal
- Dancing in The Dark (1951)
- The Day Isn’t Long Enough (1951) Jay Johnson vocal
- Deep Purple (1951)
- Don’t Blame Me (1951) Jay Johnson vocal
- Durango + (1950)
- Gone With The Wind (1950) Jay Johnson vocal
- He’s My Guy (1942) Eve Knight vocal
- How Am I To Know? (1947)
- I Don’t Want to Cry Anymore (1951) Jay Johnson vocal
- I Have Faith, So Have You (1943) vocal
- I Left My Heart at The Stage Door Canteen (1942) Red Dorris vocal
- I Only Have Eyes for You (1951)
- I’d Be Lost Without You (1946) June Christy vocal
- I’m Through with Love (194?) vocal
- In the Still of The Night (1951)
- It Ain’t Necessarily So (1944) Anita O’Day vocal
- The Night We Called It A Day (1946) vocal
- Now We Know (1943) vocal
- One Dozen Roses (1942) Red Dorris vocal
- On the Sunny Side Of The Street (1944) Anita O’Day vocal
- September In the Rain (1947) The Pastels vocal arranged by Dave Lambert
- Somnambulism + (1947)
- Summertime (1945) Gene Howard vocal (long and short versions)
- Sunday, Monday Or Always (1943) Dolly Mitchell vocal
- Then I’ll Be Tired of You (1947) June Christy vocal
- This Is Romance (1946) June Christy vocal
- Tiare + (1948)
- Where or When (1951) Jay Johnson vocal
- You May Not Love Me (1946) Gene Howard vocal
- You’re Not the Kind (1948) June Christy vocal

=== Later years: 1968-1977 ===
- Angel Eyes (1977)
- Autumn In New York (197?)
- Beeline East + (1972)
- Bogota + (1970) (originally composed 1955)
- Bon Homme Richard + (1970) featuring Dick Shearer
- Bora Bora + (1974) SK band and symphony orchestra
- The Breeze and I (1970) trumpet feature
- The Breeze and I (1975)
- Broadside + (1972)
- Close To You (1971)
- Concerto To End All Concertos (1970)
- Finlandia (1976) Masonic music
- For All We Know (1971)
- Fragments of A Portrait + (1972)
- Frangipani + (1970)
- Hagan’s Alley + (1976) featuring Tim Hagans
- Hindarabi + (1970)
- Invitation (1976)
- It’s Not Easy Bein’ Green (1973) Band vocal
- Last Tango In Paris (1974)
- La Vos Del Viento + (1973) featuring Dick Shearer
- Lazy Tiger + (1973)
- Lonely Windrose + (1970)
- Lonely Windrose + (197?) brass choir & rhythm
- Lonely Windrose + (1974) SK band + symphony orchestra
- Look Who’s Mine (1974)
- The Lord’s Prayer (1976) Masonic music
- Lunada + (1970)
- Lunada + (revised 1972)
- Lunada + (revised 1973)
- Macumba Suite + (in 4 Movements) (1971)
- Mantilla + (1976)
- Medianoche + (re-working of Vax-Elation, co-composed by Hanna & Hank Levy) (1973)
- Montage + (1973)
- Montage + (1973) revised shorter version
- Montiya + (197?)
- Moorea + (1974) SK band + symphony orchestra
- Moorea + (1976)
- My Way (1971)
- Naima + (1974)
- No Media Noche + (197?)
- Querida * (1973) featuring Stan Kenton
- Reflections _ (1972)
- Reynolds-Rap + (1973) featuring Roy Reynolds
- Send in The Clowns (1974)
- Sensitivo + (1975)
- September Morn + (1976)
- Serapo + (197?)
- Similau + (1970)
- Sirocco + (1971) featuring Mike Jamieson
- Six Adagios (1976) Masonic music
- Snowfall (1977)
- The Song Is You (1974)
- Stars and Stripes Forever (1976) Masonic music
- Strangers (1971)
- The Summer Knows (1972)
- Summer Me, Winter Me (1970)
- Theme for Autumn + (1972)
- This Is All I Ask (1977) featuring Dick Shearer
- Tiare + (1968) Neophonic
- Tiare + (1970)
- Tiare + (1974) SK band and symphony orchestra
- A Time for Love (1974)
- Turido + (197?)
- Vax + (Vax-Elation) (1972) co-composed by Hanna & Hank Levy, featuring Mike Vax
- Wave (1975)
- Westwind + (1976)
- What Are You Doing the Rest Of Your Life? (1970)
- What’s New (1977)
- You Are the Sunshine of My Life (1974)
- You Go to My Head (1976)
- You Must Believe In Spring (1977)
