= Sam Noto =

American jazz trumpeter (1930–2026)

- Born: April 17, 1930; Buffalo, New York, U.S.
- Died: October 16, 2026 (aged 96)
- Genre: Jazz
- Occupation: Musician
- Instrument: Trumpet

Salvatore Michael Noto (April 17, 1930 – October 16, 2026) was an American jazz trumpeter born in Buffalo, New York, perhaps best known for his work with Stan Kenton during the 1950s.

Noto died on October 16, 2026, at the age of 96.

== Select discography ==
- 1975 Entrance! (Xanadu)
- 1975 Act One (Xanadu)
- 1977 Notes to You (Xanadu)
- 1978 Noto-Riety (Xanadu)
- 1987 2-4-5 (Unisson)
- 1999 Now Hear This (Supermono)

With Count Basie

- Pop Goes the Basie (Reprise, 1965)
- The Happiest Millionaire (Coliseum, 1967)
- Half a Sixpence (Dot, 1967)

With Al Cohn and Dexter Gordon

- Silver Blue (1976; Xanadu)
- True Blue (1976; Xanadu)

With Stan Kenton

- Kenton Showcase (Capitol, 1954)
- Contemporary Concepts (Capitol, 1955)
- Kenton in Hi-Fi (Capitol, 1956)
- Cuban Fire! (Capitol, 1956)
- Rendezvous with Kenton (Capitol, 1957)
- Back to Balboa (Capitol, 1958)

With Rob McConnell

- The Jazz Album (1976; Sea Breeze)
- Live in Digital (1980; Sea Breeze)
- Night Flight (1993; Sea Breeze)

With Frank Rosolino

- Frank Rosolino - Kenton Presents Jazz (Capitol; 1954, 1956 LP)

With Red Rodney

- Superbop (Muse, 1974)

With Kenny Drew

- For Sure! (1978; Xanadu)
