= Skeets Herfurt =

American jazz saxophonist and clarinetist

Arthur Relsmond "Skeets" Herfurt (28 May 1911 – 17 April 1992) was an American jazz saxophonist and clarinetist.

== Career highlights ==
Herfurt was born in Cincinnati and raised in Denver and played in bands while attending the University of Colorado. He performed with Smith Ballew (1934), Jimmy and Tommy Dorsey (together 1934–1935, Jimmy 1935–1937, and Tommy 1937–1939), and Ray Noble. After moving to California, he worked with Alvino Rey, then served in the Army from 1944 to 1945. After the war, he flourished as a studio musician in Hollywood, led his own band, and performed with Benny Goodman from 1946 to 1947 and Earle Spencer in 1946.

His studio credits, into the 1960s, include sessions with Nelson Riddle on many Frank Sinatra recordings, Billy May, Louis Armstrong, Georgie Auld, Jack Teagarden, and Stan Kenton. He worked with Goodman again in 1961 and 1964. End of the 1960s he joined the Ray Conniff orchestra for several tours (a. o. Japan and Germany) and recording sessions during the 1970s. Herfurt was a member of Lawrence Welk's orchestra and weekly television show from 1979 to 1982, performing on lead alto saxophone.

He died in New Orleans at the age of 80.

== Filmography ==
Herfurt appeared as a saxophonist in the 1956 film The Nightmare, and plays clarinet on the soundtrack. He also performed on the soundtrack to the 1974 film The Fortune.

== Discography ==
With Glen Gray

- Casa Loma in Hi-Fi (Capitol, 1956)
- Sounds of the Great Bands! (Capitol, 1958)
- Solo Spotlight (Capitol, 1960)
- Please Mr. Gray... (Capitol, 1961)

With Billy May

- A Band Is Born (Capitol, 1952)
- Sorta-May (Capitol, 1955)
- The Girls and Boys On Broadway (Capitol, 1960)

With others

- Ray Anthony, Ray Anthony Plays Steve Allen (Capitol, 1958)
- Georgie Auld, In the Land of Hi-Fi with Georgie Auld and His Orchestra (EmArcy/Mercury, 1956)
- Joe "Fingers" Carr, The Riotous, Raucous, Red-Hot 20's! (Warner Bros., 1961)
- Frankie Carle, Era: The 30' Music of the Great Bands (Dot, 1968)
- Larry Clinton, The Uncollected Larry Clinton and His Orchestra 1937-1938 (Hindsight, 1977)
- Ray Conniff, Turn Around Look at Me (CBS, 1968)
- Ray Conniff, Concert in Stereo (Columbia, 1970)
- Bob Eberly & Helen O'Connell, Recapturing the Excitement of the Jimmy Dorsey Era (Warner Bros., 1961)
- Benny Goodman, Hello Benny! (Capitol, 1964)
- The Four Freshmen, Four Freshmen and Five Saxes (Capitol, 1957)
- Bob Keene, Bob Keene & His Orchestra (Fresh Sound, 1954)
- Stan Kenton, Kenton in Hi-Fi (Capitol, 1956)
- Pete Rugolo, 10 Saxophones and 2 Basses (Mercury, 1961)
- Jack Teagarden, This Is Teagarden! (Capitol, 1956)
