= Vido Musso =

American jazz saxophonist (1913–1982)

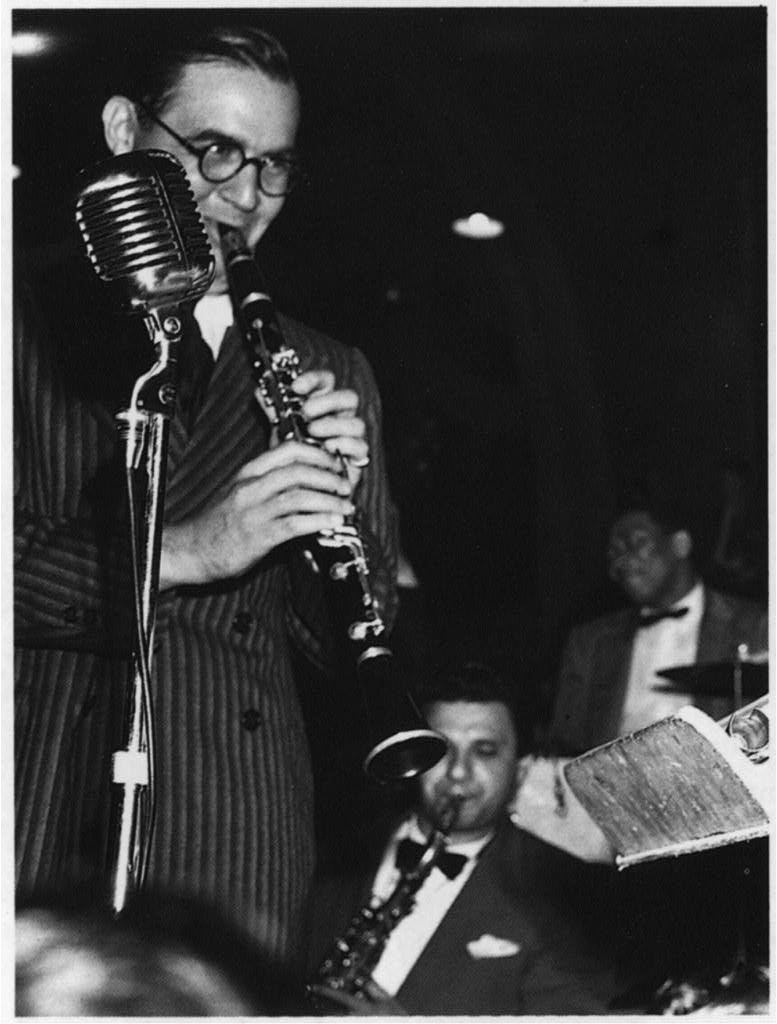
- Musso (middle) performs with Benny Goodman (left) and Sid Catlett (right) in the 1940s.

Background information
- Birth name: Vito Gugliermo Musso
- Born: January 16, 1913; Carini, Palermo, Sicily
- Died: January 9, 1982 (aged 68); Rancho Mirage, California, U.S.
- Genres: Jazz
- Occupation: Musician
- Instrument: Saxophone
- Years active: 1930–1975

Vido William Musso (January 16, 1913 – January 9, 1982) was an American jazz saxophonist.

== Biography ==
Musso is a fairly obscure figure in the history of jazz and big band music. He relocated with his family from Carini, Sicily to the U.S. in July 1920, arriving at the Port of New York aboard the Italian steamship Patria. His parents are Francesco Musso and Maria Lentini. They settled in Detroit, where Musso began learning to play the clarinet. Ten years later, he moved to Los Angeles and co-founded a big band with Stan Kenton in 1935. Musso left the band the following year to collaborate with Gus Arnheim, Benny Goodman, and Gene Krupa. He accompanied Billie Holiday and pianist Teddy Wilson on recordings in the late 1930s. Later, he took over leadership of his own band from Bunny Berigan but struggled to establish himself as a successful big band leader during the 1930s and 1940s. However, he spent most of his career as a sideman. After returning to Goodman, he was a member of big bands led by Harry James, Woody Herman, and Tommy Dorsey. He returned to perform with Kenton in the mid-1940s before retiring around 1975 after relocating to California.

As a leader, Musso recorded for Savoy (1946), Trilon (1947), Arco, Fantasy (1952), RPM, Crown, and Modern.

The Santa Monica Daily Press, (25th. March, 2016), mentioned that Shecky Greene married Musso's daughter, Marie Musso, in 1985.

== Discography ==
=== As leader ===
Singles

- "Jig-a-Jive" // "I've Been a Fool" with Betty Van (Davis & Schwegler, 1938)
- "Moose on a Loose" // "Vido in a Jam" (Savoy, 1946) with Kai Winding, Gene Roland, Boots Mussulli
- "Spellbound" // "Lem Me Go" (Savoy, 1946) with the Eddie Safranski All Stars (including Lem Davis)
- "My Jo-Ann" // "Big Deal" (B-side by Charlie Ventura) (Savoy, 1946)
- "On the Mercury" with the Raye Sisters // "Vido's Bop" (Trilon, 1947)
- "Vido in a Mist"// "Gone with Vido" (Trilon, 1947)
- "Trees" with Ray Wetzel // "The Unfinished Boogie" (Trilon, 1947)
- "The Day I Left Alsace-Lorraine" with the Honeydreamers // "Checkerboard" (Trilon, 1947)
- "Santa Lucia" // "Pagliacci" with Stan Kenton and his Orchestra (Capitol, 1950)
- "Blue Night" // "Vido's Boogie" (RPM, 1953)
- "Vido's Drive" // "Frosty" (RPM, 1954)
- "Blues for Two" // "Speak Easy" (RPM, 1957)
- "Lullaby" // "Roseland Boogie" (Crown, 1953)
- "Musso's Boogie" // "Sing, Sing, Sing" (Crown, 1954)
- "Flat Top Boogie" // "Power House Boogie" (Crown, 1954)

Albums

- Loaded (Savoy MG-12074, 1956) with Kai Winding, Gene Roland, Boots Mussulli, Eddie Safranski, Denzil Best.
- The Swingin'st (Modern LMP-1207, 1956) with Maynard Ferguson, Milt Bernhart. Re-released in US in 1957 on Crown Records (CLP-5007). Released in UK in 1961 on Eros Records (ERL-50030).
- Teenage Dance Party (Crown Records CLP-5029, 1957) (with Doug McClure on front sleeve). Released on Eros Records in UK in 1961, with different front sleeve.
- Thanks for the Thrill (Sounds of Yesteryear, 2015).

=== As sideman ===
With Wardell Gray

- Way Out Wardell (Modern, 1956)

With Stan Kenton

- Artistry in Rhythm (Capitol, 1950)
- Encores (Capitol, 1950)
- Stan Kenton's Milestones (Capitol, 1950)
- Stan Kenton Classics (Capitol, 1952)
- The Kenton Era (Capitol, 1955)
- Kenton in Hi-Fi (Capitol, 1956)

With Jess Stacy

- Tribute to Benny Goodman (Atlantic, 1954)
