= Artistry in Rhythm =

Studio album by Stan Kenton and His Orchestra
- Released: 1946
- Recorded: June 4, 1946, July 12 & 26, 1946, August 2, 1946
- Studios: Radio Recorders, Hollywood, CA
- Genre: Jazz
- Length: 24:09; 36:16 (1955 re-issue)
- Label: Capitol BD 39
- Producer: Lee Gillette

Stan Kenton chronology
Artistry in Rhythm (1946)	Encores (1947)

Artistry in Rhythm is an album by pianist and bandleader Stan Kenton featuring performances recorded in 1946 and originally released on the Capitol label as four 78 rpm discs, reissued as a 10-inch (25 cm) LP in 1953, and then as a 12-inch (30 cm) LP in 1955 with additional tracks.

== Reception ==
Professional ratings
Review scores
Source	Rating
Allmusic	4.5/5 stars

The Allmusic review by Scott Yanow observed: "It's a fine sampling of Stan Kenton's mid-'40s orchestra."

== Track listing ==
All tracks were composed by Stan Kenton except where noted:

1. "Come Back to Sorrento" (Ernesto De Curtis) – 3:07
2. "Just A-Sittin' and A-Rockin'" (Duke Ellington, Billy Strayhorn, Lee Gaines) – 2:46 Additional track on 12-inch LP
3. "Fantasy" – 2:46
4. "Opus in Pastels" – 2:45
5. "Soothe Me" (Joe Greene) – 3:08 Additional track on 12-inch LP
6. "Cocktails for Two" (Arthur Johnston, Sam Coslow) – 2:59 Additional track on 12-inch LP
7. "Artistry in Bolero" (Milt Raskin, Pete Rugolo) – 3:00
8. "Ain't No Misery in Me" (Gene Roland) – 2:59
9. "Safranski (Artistry in Bass)" (Rugolo) – 3:09
10. "Santa Lucia" (Teodoro Cottrau) – 3:14 Additional track on 12-inch LP
11. "Willow Weep for Me" (Ann Ronell) – 3:14
12. "Artistry in Percussion" (Rugolo) – 3:09

All tracks were recorded at Radio Recorders in Hollywood, California, United States, North America over a five-year period on the following dates:

- October 30, 1945 (track 2)
- June 4, 1946 (track 1)
- July 12, 1946 (track 7–9 & 12)
- July 19, 1946 (track 6)
- July 25, 1946 (track 11)
- July 26, 1946 (track 3)
- August 2, 1946 (track 4)
- September 24, 1947 (track 5)
- September 14, 1950 (track 10)

== Personnel ==
The musicians recorded for the album included:

- Stan Kenton – piano, conductor, arranger
- Alfred "Chico" Alvarez (tracks 1 & 3–12), John Anderson (tracks 1–4, 6–9, 11 & 12), Russ Burgher (track 2), Buddy Childers (tracks 1–9, 11 & 12), Maynard Ferguson (track 10), Ken Hanna (tracks 1, 3–9, 11 & 12), John Howell (track 10), Bob Lymperis (track 2) Al Porcino (tracks 5 & 10), Shorty Rogers (track 10), Ray Wetzel (tracks 1–9, 11 & 12) – trumpet
- Milt Bernhart (tracks 5 & 10), Eddie Bert (tracks 5 & 10), Harry Betts (tracks 5 & 10), Bob Fitzpatrick (track 10), Harry Forbes (tracks 3–5 & 11), Milt Kabak (tracks 1, 2, 6–9 & 12), Jimmy Simms (track 2), Miff Sines (tracks 1, 3, 4, 6–9, 11 & 12), Kai Winding (tracks 1, 3, 4, 6–9, 11 & 12) Freddie Zito (track 2) – trombone
- Bart Varsalona – bass trombone
- Al Anthony (tracks 1–4, 6–9, 11 & 12), Boots Mussulli (tracks 1–4, 6–9, 11 & 12), Frank Pappalardo (track 5), Art Pepper (track 10), Bud Shank (track 10), George Weidler (track 5) – alto saxophone
- Bart Caldarell (track 10), Bob Cooper, Vido Musso (tracks 1–4 & 6–12), Warner Weidler (track 5) – tenor saxophone
- Bob Gioga – baritone saxophone
- Pete Rugolo – piano (track 1)
- Bob Ahern (tracks 1–4, 6–9, 11 & 12), Laurindo Almeida (tracks 5 & 10) – guitar
- Don Bagley (track 10), Eddie Safranski (tracks 1–9, 11 &7 12) – bass
- Ralph Collier (track 2), Shelly Manne (tracks 1 & 3–12) – drums
- Jack Costanzo – bongos (track 5)
- Miguel Rivera – congas (track 10)
- June Christy – vocals (tracks 2, 5, 8 & 11)
- Stan Kenton (tracks 3 & 4), Gene Roland (tracks 2 & 8), Pete Rugolo (tracks 1, 5–7 & 9–12) – arranger

== See also ==
- Stan Kenton
