= Boots Mussulli =

American jazz saxophonist

Henry "Boots" Mussulli (November 18, 1915 in Milford, Massachusetts – September 23, 1967 in Norfolk, Massachusetts) was an American jazz saxophonist, based chiefly out of Boston.

According to the Social Security files, he was born in 1915, not in 1917 as previously stated.

Mussulli's first instrument was clarinet, which he first played at age 12. He played with Mal Hallett in Massachusetts around 1940, and joined Teddy Powell's group in 1943-44. He played with Stan Kenton from 1944 to 1947 and returned to play with Kenton again on tour in 1952 and 1954. He also played with Vido Musso, Gene Krupa (1948), Charlie Ventura (1949), Serge Chaloff, Toshiko Akiyoshi (1955), and Herb Pomeroy and Ron Julian (alto saxophone).

In 1949, Mussulli opened a jazz club in his hometown, called "The Crystal Room". From the mid-1950s, he concentrated more on music education, leading a local youth orchestra, the Milford Youth Band, at the Newport Jazz Festival in 1967. He died of cancer shortly thereafter.

== Discography ==
=== As leader ===
- The Fable of Mabel (Storyville, 1954) - with Serge Chaloff, Russ Freeman
- Kenton Presents Jazz: Boots Mussulli Quartet (Capitol, 1954)

=== As sideman ===
With Stan Kenton

- Artistry in Rhythm (Capitol, 1946–47 [rel. 1950])
- Encores (Capitol, 1946–47 [rel. 1950])
- Stan Kenton's Milestones (Capitol, 1943–47 [rel. 1950])
- Stan Kenton Classics (Capitol, 1944–47 [rel. 1952])
- The Kenton Era (Capitol, 1940–54, [rel. 1955])

With Herb Pomeroy

- Life Is a Many Splendored Gig (Roulette, 1957)
