= Carl Fontana =

American jazz trombonist

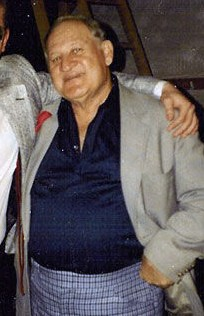
- Fontana at Ball State University, 1989

Background information
- Born: Carl Charles Fontana; July 18, 1928; Monroe, Louisiana, U.S.
- Died: October 9, 2003 (aged 75) Las Vegas, Nevada, U.S.
- Genres: Jazz
- Occupation: Musician
- Instrument: Trombone
- Years active: 1940–2000
- Formerly of: Supersax

Carl Charles Fontana (July 18, 1928 – October 9, 2003) was an American jazz trombonist. After working in the big bands of Woody Herman, Lionel Hampton, and Stan Kenton, he devoted most of his career to playing music in Las Vegas.

== Career ==
Fontana was born in Monroe, Louisiana, United States. His first break into the professional jazz scene came in 1952, when he was hired to stand in for one of Woody Herman's regular trombonists, Urbie Green. When Green returned, Herman kept Fontana on as a permanent member of the band.

After three years with Herman, Fontana joined Lionel Hampton's big band in 1954. In early 1955, he played briefly with Hal McIntyre and Chicago pianist and Playboy executive, Sam Distefano at Sam's Miami nightclub, The Stut 'n' Tut. He later joined Stan Kenton's big band. Fontana recorded three albums with Kenton and worked with trombonist Kai Winding during this period.

After 1958, Fontana rarely toured, but undertook a 1966 tour of Africa with Herman's band sponsored by the U.S. State Department. He primarily performed with house orchestras in Las Vegas during the 1960s, particularly Paul Anka's band (with Frank Rosolino). He also performed in bands backing Sammy Davis Jr., Tony Bennett, Wayne Newton, and the Benny Goodman orchestra.

In the 1970s, he continued performing in house orchestras and lounges in Las Vegas. He also recorded with Louie Bellson, Bill Watrous, and Supersax. It was not until 1975 that Fontana recorded an album as an ensemble co-leader. He shared the billing for this record, The Hanna-Fontana Band: Live at Concord (Concord Jazz) with drummer Jake Hanna. Fontana toured in Japan with this ensemble. In 1978, he was featured on the jazz trombone recording Bobby Knight's Great American Trombone Company, with Charles Loper, Lew McCreary, Frank Rosolino, Phil Teele, and Bobby Knight.

In the 1980s, he appeared regularly on National Public Radio's Monday Night Jazz program. His first album as a headliner was The Great Fontana (Uptown Jazz, 1985).

In 2001, he joined The West Coast All Stars and played a concert in Stuttgart, Germany. He was joined by Conte Candoli, Teddy Edwards, Pete Jolly, Chuck Berghofer, and Joe LaBarbera. He was featured on the song "If I Only Had a Brain", from the movie The Wizard of Oz.

Fontana died October 9, 2003, in Las Vegas, Nevada, aged 75 after suffering from Alzheimer's disease.
