= Eddie Safranski =

American jazz double bassist, composer and arranger (1918–1974)

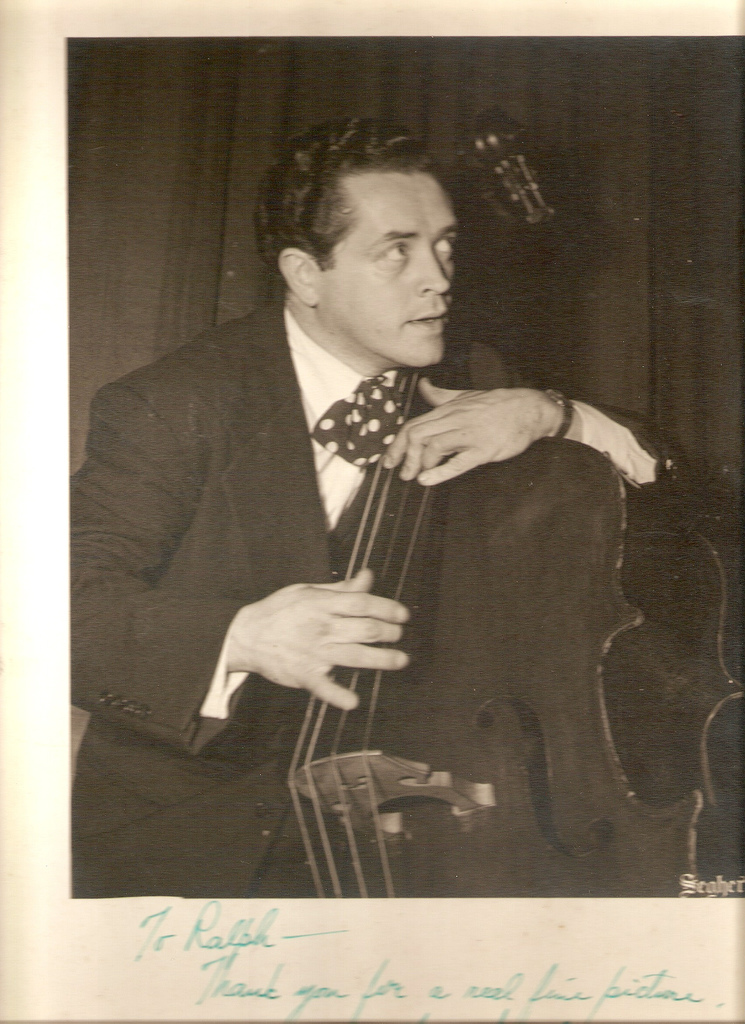

Background information
- Born: Eric Edward Safranski; December 25, 1918; Pittsburgh, Pennsylvania, U.S.
- Died: January 10, 1974 (aged 55) Los Angeles, California, U.S.
- Genres: Jazz
- Occupation: Musician
- Instrument: Double bass
- Years active: 1940s–1970s

Eddie Safranski (December 25, 1918 – January 10, 1974) was an American jazz double bassist, composer and arranger who worked with Stan Kenton. He also worked with Tony Bennett, Charlie Barnet, Benny Goodman and Bobby Darin. From 1946 to 1953 he won the Down Beat Readers' Poll for bassist.

== Biography ==
A native of Pittsburgh, Pennsylvania, United States, Safranski took violin lessons as a child. In high school he began playing double bass.

His career began in 1941 with Hal McIntyre. Safranski played bass and wrote arrangements for McIntyre until 1945. He then worked with Miff Mole, Stan Kenton, and Charlie Barnet.

After moving to New York City, he was hired by NBC as a studio musician. During the 1950s, he played with Benny Goodman and Marian McPartland. In the 1960s, he taught classes and workshops as the representative of a bass company.

At the end of his career, he lived in Los Angeles and played in bands there.

== Personal ==
He was born Eric Edward Szafranski to Bronislaw and Wladyslawa. He was married to Irene Kovach and had one daughter, Erica. He died in Los Angeles, California, in January 1974, at the age of 55.

== Discography ==
=== As sideman ===
- Tony Bennett, The Beat of My Heart (Columbia, 1957)
- Tony Bennett, Just One of Those Things (Harmony, 1969)
- Sonny Berman, Beautiful Jewish Music (Onyx, 1973)
- Barney Bigard, Clarinet Gumbo (RCA, 1976)
- John Cacavas, Sound Spectrum for Orchestra (Murbo, 1963)
- Bobby Darin, That's All (Atco, 1959)
- Don Elliott & Rusty Dedrick, Counterpoint for Six Valves (Riverside, 1959)
- Stan Getz, The Complete Roost Recordings (Blue Note, 1997)
- Dizzy Gillespie, The Complete RCA Victor Recordings (Bluebird, 1995)
- Sammy Herman, Something Old...and Something New (Everest, 1959)
- Dick Hyman, Gigi (MGM, 1958)
- J. J. Johnson & Kai Winding, Jay and Kai (Savoy 1955)
- Stan Kenton, The Uncollected 1945–1947 Vol. 5 (Hindsight, 1980)
- Hal McIntyre, The Uncollected Hal McIntyre and His Orchestra 1943–1946 (Hindsight, 1981)
- Billy Maxted, Plays Hi Fi Keyboards (Cadence, 1955)
- Anthony Perkins, On a Rainy Afternoon (RCA Victor, 1958)
- Andre Previn, Previn at Sunset (Polydor, 1972)
- Hymie Shertzer, All the King's Saxes (Disneyland, 1958)
- Johnny Smith, Moonlight in Vermont ( (Roost, 1956)
- Joe Venuti, Joe Venuti and the Blue Five (From the Jazz Vault, 1979)
- Cootie Williams, Cootie Williams in Hi-Fi (RCA Victor, 1958)
