= Cool Christy =

Compilation album by June Christy
- Released: 2002
- Genre: Jazz
- Label: Proper Records Ltd

June Christy chronology
Live at the Newport Jazz Festival with Stan Kenton (1999)	Cool Christy (2002)	Something Cool - 101 Essential June Christy (2012)

Cool Christy is a 2002 double-CD compilation of recordings by jazz vocalist June Christy from 1945 to 1951. It features her collaborations with multiple bands, including Bob Cooper, Art Pepper, and Shorty Rogers.

== Disc one ==
1. "Tampico" (Gene Roland)
2. "It's Been a Long, Long Time" (Jule Styne, Sammy Cahn)
3. "It Ain't Necessarily So" (George Gershwin, Ira Gershwin)
4. "How High the Moon" (Nancy Hamilton, Morgan Lewis)
5. "Wrap Your Troubles in Dreams" (Harry Barris, Ted Koehler, Billy Moll)
6. "I Can't Believe That You're in Love with Me" (Jimmy McHugh, Clarence Gaskill)
7. "Hay Lawdy Papa" (Gene Roland)
8. "Stompin' at the Savoy" (Edgar Sampson, Andy Razaf, Benny Goodman, Chick Webb)
9. "Get Happy" (Harold Arlen, Ted Koehler)
10. "Can't Help Lovin' Dat Man" (Jerome Kern, Oscar Hammerstein II)
11. "Don't Worry 'bout Me" (Rube Bloom, Ted Koehler)
12. "Mean to Me" (Roy Turk, Fred E. Ahlert)
13. "Lover Man" (Jimmy Davis, Ram Ramirez, James Sherman)
14. "September in the Rain" (Harry Warren, Al Dubin)
15. "Sweet Lorraine" (Cliff Burwell, Mitchell Parish)
16. "Make Love to Me" (Paul Mann, Stephen Weiss, Kim Gannon)
17. "Supper Time" (Irving Berlin)
18. "What's New?" (Bob Haggart, Johnny Burke)
19. "I've Got a Guy" (Marion Sunshine)
20. "I Can't Give You Anything but Love, Baby" (Jimmy McHugh, Dorothy Fields)
21. "This Is Romance" (Vernon Duke, Edward Heyman)
22. "Prelude to a Kiss" (Duke Ellington, Irving Gordon, Irving Mills)
23. "I'm Thrilled" (Sidney Lippman, Sylvia Dee)
24. "You're Blasé" (Ord Hamilton, Bruce Siever)
25. "Lullaby in Rhythm" (Walter Hirsh, Benny Goodman)

=== Personnel ===
Track 1 - recorded Chicago, 4 May 1945

- June Christy - vocals
- Stan Kenton and his Orchestra
- John Carroll - trumpet
- Buddy Childers - trumpet
- John Anderson - trumpet
- Gene Roland - trumpet, arranger
- Mel Green - trumpet
- Freddie Zito - trombone
- Milt Kabak - trombone
- Marshall Ocker - trombone
- Bart Varsalona - bass trombone
- Bob Lively - alto saxophone
- Boots Mussulli - alto saxophone
- Joe Magro - tenor saxophone
- Dave Madden - tenor saxophone
- Bob Gioga - baritone saxophone
- Stan Kenton - piano
- Bob Ahern - guitar
- Max Wayne - bass
- Bob Varney - drums

Track 2 - recorded New York, 30 July 1945

- June Christy - vocals
- Stan Kenton and his Orchestra
- Buddy Childers - trumpet
- Ray Wetzel - trumpet
- John Anderson - trumpet
- Russ Burgher - trumpet
- Bob Lymperis - trumpet
- Freddie Zito - trombone
- Milt Kabak - trombone
- Jimmy Simms - trombone
- Bart Varsalona - bass trombone
- Al Anthony - alto saxophone
- Boots Mussulli - alto saxophone
- Bob Cooper - tenor saxophone
- Bill McDougald - tenor saxophone
- Bob Gioga - baritone saxophone
- Stan Kenton - piano
- Bob Ahern - guitar
- Eddie Safranski - bass
- Bob Varney - drums

Track 3 - recorded Hollywood, 20 December 1945

- June Christy - vocals
- Stan Kenton and his Orchestra
- Buddy Childers - trumpet
- Ray Wetzel - trumpet
- John Anderson - trumpet
- Russ Burgher - trumpet
- Bob Lymperis - trumpet
- Freddie Zito - trombone
- Milt Kabak - trombone
- Jimmy Simms - trombone
- Ray Klein - trombone
- Al Anthony - alto saxophone
- Boots Mussulli - alto saxophone
- Bob Cooper - tenor saxophone
- Bob Gioga - baritone saxophone
- Stan Kenton - piano
- Bob Ahern - guitar
- Boots Mussulli - alto saxophone
- Bob Cooper - tenor saxophone

Tracks 4–17 - recorded Los Angeles, December 1945

- June Christy - vocals
- Ray Wetzel - trumpet
- Gene Roland - valve trombone
- Boots Mussulli - alto saxophone
- Bob Cooper - tenor saxophone
- Pete Rugolo - piano
- Dave Barbour - guitar
- Boots Mussulli - alto saxophone
- Bob Cooper - tenor saxophone

Tracks 18–25 - recorded Los Angeles, January 1946

- June Christy - vocals
- Ray Wetzel - trumpet
- Kai Winding - trombone
- Boots Mussulli - alto saxophone
- Bob Cooper - tenor saxophone
- Buddy Cole - piano
- Eddie Safranski - bass
- Jimmy Pratt - drums

== Disc two ==
1. "The One I Love" (Isham Jones, Gus Kahn)
2. "Moonglow" (Will Hudson, Eddie DeLange)
3. "How Long Has This Been Going On? (George Gershwin, Ira Gershwin)
4. "Rika Jika Jack" (Eric Dawson, Maxine Sullivan, Walter Hagen)
5. "I'd Be Lost Without You" (Sunny Skylar)
6. "It's a Pity to Say Goodnight" (Billy Reid, Mack Gordon)
7. "His Feet Too Big for the Bed" (Hernan Brana, Dick Sanford, Sammy Mysels)
8. "Don't Want That Man Around" (Joe Rizzo, Sam Braude, Sam Volk)
9. "Across the Alley from the Alamo" (Joe Greene)
10. "If I Should Lose You" (Ralph Rainger, Leo Robin)
11. "Skip Rope" (Sidney Lippman, Sylvia Dee)
12. "Please Be Kind" (Saul Chaplin, Sammy Cahn)
13. "I Got It Bad (and That Ain't Good)" (Duke Ellington, Paul Francis Webster)
14. "Curiosity" (Alex Kramer, Joan Whitney, Sam Ward)
15. "He Was a Good Man as Good Men Go" (Teddy Powell)
16. "Lonely Woman" (Benny Carter, Zola Sonin)
17. "The Way You Look Tonight" (Jerome Kern, Dorothy Fields)
18. "Everything Happens to Me" (Matt Dennis, Tom Adair)
19. "I'll Remember April" (Gene de Paul, Patricia Johnston, Don Raye)
20. "Get Happy" (Harold Arlen, Ted Koehler)
21. "A Mile Down the Highway (There's a Toll Bridge)" (David Mann, Bob Hilliard)
22. "Do It Again" (George Gershwin, Buddy DeSylva)
23. "He Can Come Back Anytime He Wants To" (Johnny Lehman)
24. "Easy Street" (Alan Rankin Jones)

=== Personnel ===
Tracks 1–3 - recorded Los Angeles, January 1946

- June Christy - vocals
- Ray Wetzel - trumpet
- Kai Winding - trombone
- Boots Mussulli - alto saxophone
- Bob Cooper - tenor saxophone
- Buddy Cole - piano
- Eddie Safranski - bass
- Jimmy Pratt - drums

Track 4 - recorded Hollywood, 4 June 1946

- June Christy - vocals
- Stan Kenton and his Orchestra
- Buddy Childers - trumpet
- Ray Wetzel - trumpet
- Chico Alvarez - trumpet
- John Anderson - trumpet
- Ken Hanna - trumpet
- Kai Winding - trombone
- Miff Sines - trombone
- Milt Kabak - trombone
- Bart Varsalona - bass trombone
- Al Anthony - alto saxophone
- Boots Mussulli - alto saxophone
- Vido Musso - tenor saxophone
- Bob Cooper - tenor saxophone
- Bob Gioga - baritone saxophone
- Stan Kenton - piano
- Bob Ahern - guitar
- Eddie Safranski - bass
- Shelly Manne - drums

Track 5 - recorded Hollywood, 19 July 1946

- June Christy - vocals
- Stan Kenton and his Orchestra
- same personnel as Track 4

Track 6 - recorded Hollywood, 25 July 1946

- June Christy - vocals
- Stan Kenton and his Orchestra
- same personnel as Track 4, but Harry Forbes (trombone) replaces Milt Kabak

Track 8 - recorded Hollywood, 13 February 1947

- June Christy - vocals
- Stan Kenton and his Orchestra
- Buddy Childers - trumpet
- Ray Wetzel - trumpet
- Chico Alvarez - trumpet
- John Anderson - trumpet
- Ken Hanna - trumpet
- Kai Winding - trombone
- Skip Layton - trombone
- Milt Bernhart - trombone
- Harry Forbes - trombone
- Bart Varsalona - bass trombone
- Eddie Meyers - also saxophone
- Boots Mussulli - alto saxophone
- Vido Musso - tenor saxophone
- Bob Cooper - tenor saxophone
- Bob Gioga - baritone saxophone
- Stan Kenton - piano
- Bob Ahern - guitar
- Eddie Safranski - bass
- Shelly Manne - drums

Track 7 - recorded New York, 2 January 1947

- June Christy - vocals
- Stan Kenton and his Orchestra
- Buddy Childers - trumpet
- Ray Wetzel - trumpet
- Chico Alvarez - trumpet
- John Anderson - trumpet
- Ken Hanna - trumpet
- Kai Winding - trombone
- Skip Layton - trombone
- Harry Forbes - trombone
- Bart Varsalona - bass trombone
- Eddie Meyers - also saxophone
- Boots Mussulli - alto saxophone
- Red Dorris - tenor saxophone
- Bob Cooper - tenor saxophone
- Bob Gioga - baritone saxophone
- Stan Kenton - piano
- Bob Ahern - guitar
- Eddie Safranski - bass
- Shelly Manne - drums
- José Mangual - bongos
- Pedro Allendo - maracas
- The Pastels * Margaret Dale * Dave Lambert * Wayne Howard * Jerry Packer * Jerry Duane

Track 9 - recorded Hollywood, 28 February 1947

- June Christy - vocals
- Stan Kenton and his Orchestra
- same personnel as Track 7, but The Pastels out.

Track 10 - recorded Los Angeles, 3 March 1947

- June Christy - vocals
- Frank De Vol’s Orchestra
- Ray Linn - trumpet
- Juan Tizol - valve trombone
- Richard Perissi - French horn
- Vincent DeRosa - French horn
- Evan Vail - French horn
- Vincent De Robertis - French horn
- Skeets Herfurt - reeds
- Jules Kinsler - reeds
- Ted Romersa - reeds
- Jerome Kasper - reeds
- Ronald Pirozzi - reeds
- Felix Slatkin - violin
- Joseph Quadri - violin
- Marshall Sosson - violin
- Joachim Chassman - violin
- Buddy Cole - piano
- Al Hendrickson - guitar
- Eddie Safranski - bass
- Shelly Manne - drums
- Frank De Vol - arranger, conductor

Track 11 - recorded Los Angeles, 31 March 1947

- June Christy - vocals
- Frank De Vol's Orchestra
- Neal Hefti - trumpet
- Zeke Zarchy - trumpet
- Dick Cathcart - trumpet
- Ray Linn - trumpet
- Juan Tizol - valve trombone
- Skeets Herfurt - reeds
- Jules Kinjsler - reeds
- Tede Romersa - reeds
- Jerome Kasper - reeds
- Ronald Pirozzi - reeds
- Buddy Cole piano
- Barney Kessel -guitar
- Eddie Safranski - bass
- Shelly Manne - drums
- Frank De Vol - arranger, conductor

Tracks 12, 13 - recorded Hollywood, 1 April 1947

- June Christy - vocals
- Stan Kenton and his Orchestra
- same personnel as Track 8.

Track 14 - recorded Hollywood, 25 September 1947

- June Christy - vocals
- Stan Kenton and his Orchestra
- Buddy Childers - trumpet
- Ray Wetzel - trumpet
- Al Porcino - trumpet
- Chico Alvarez - trumpet
- Ken Hanna - trumpet
- Milt Bernhart - trombone
- Eddie Burt - trombone
- Harry Betts - trombone
- Harry Forbes - trombone
- Bart Varsalona - bass trombone
- George Weidler - alto saxophone
- Frank Pappalardo - alto saxophone
- Bob Cooper - tenor saxophone
- Warner Weidler - tenor saxophone
- Bob Gioga - baritone saxophone
- Stan Kenton - piano
- Laurindo Almeida - guitar
- Eddie Safranski - bass
- Shelly Manne - drums
- Jack Costanzo - bongos

Track 15 - recorded Hollywood, 22 October 1947

- June Christy - vocals
- Stan Kenton and his Orchestra
- same personnel as Track 14, but Art Pepper replaces Frank Pappalardo

Track 16 - recorded Hollywood, 6 December 1947

- June Christy - vocals
- Stan Kenton and his Orchestra
- same personnel as Track 15

Tracks 17, 18 - recorded Los Angeles, 28 March 1949

- June Christy - vocals
- Bob Cooper's Orchestra
- Buddy Childers - trumpet
- Johnny Mandel - bass trumpet
- Billy Byers - trombone
- Art Pepper - alto saxophone
- Bob Cooper - tenor saxophone
- Irv Roth baritone saxophone
- Hal Schaefer - piano
- Joe Mondragon bass
- Don Lamond - drums
- Luis Miranda - congas (track 17)
- Jasper Hornyak - violin (track 17)
- Cesare Pascarello cello (track 18)
- John Lewis - arranger (track 17)
- Bob Graettinger - arranger (track 18)

Tracks 19, 20 - recorded Los Angeles, 29 September 1949

- June Christy - vocals
- Pete Rugolo's Orchestra
- Alex Gershunoff - flute
- Pete Rugolo piano, arranger
- Laurindo Almeida -guitar
- Don Whittaker - bass
- Jackie Mills drums
- Harry Bluestone - violin
- Dave Klein - violin
- Mishe Russell - violin
- Stan Harris - viola
- Cy Benard - viola

Tracks 21–23 - recorded Los Angeles, 11 September 1950

- June Christy - vocals
- Shorty Rogers and his Giants
- John Graas - French horn
- Gene England - tuba
- Art Pepper - also saxophone
- Bud Shank - tenor saxophone
- Bob Cooper - tenor saxophone
- Bob Gioga - baritone saxophone
- Claude Williamson - piano
- Don Bagley - bass
- Shelly Manne - drums
- Shorty Rogers - conductor, arranger

Track 24 - recorded Hollywood, 20 September 1951

- June Christy - vocals
- Stan Kenton and his Orchestra
- John Howell - trumpet
- Maynard Ferguson - trumpet
- Conte Candoli - trumpet
- Stu Williamson - trumpet
- John Copolla - trumpet
- Dick Kenney - trombone
- Harry Betts - trombone
- Bob Fitzpatrick - trombone
- Bill Russo
- George Roberts - bass trombone
- Bud Shank - alto saxophone
- Art Pepper - alto saxophone
- Bob Cooper - tenor saxophone
- Bart Caldarell - tenor saxophone
- Bob Gioga - saxophone
- Stan Kenton - piano
- Ralph Blaze - guitar
- Don Bagley - bass
- Shelly Manne - drums
