= City of Glass (Stan Kenton album) =

Studio album by Stan Kenton
- Released: 1951 (original LP); 1995 (re-issue CD)
- Recorded: 1947–1953 (1951 original 10" LP) other tracks 1947–1953 in Hollywood, CA, or New York City
- Studio: Capitol (Hollywood)
- Genre: Avant garde jazz; third stream; big band
- Length: 16:29 (1951 LP); 63:15 (1995 CD)
- Label: Capitol Records
- Producer: Pete Rugolo; Jim Conkling; Lee Gillette; Michael Cuscuna (CD)

Stan Kenton chronology
Stan Kenton Presents (1950)	City of Glass (1951)	New Concepts of Artistry in Rhythm (1952)
- cat # Capitol H353 (10" LP); Capitol Jazz 7243 8 32084 2 5 (CD)

City of Glass, an album originally issued as a 10-inch LP by Stan Kenton, consists entirely of the music of Bob Graettinger. The original album has been reconstituted in different LP re-issues, and the entire set of Kenton/Graettinger Capitol Records sessions is on the digital CD City of Glass.

== Background ==
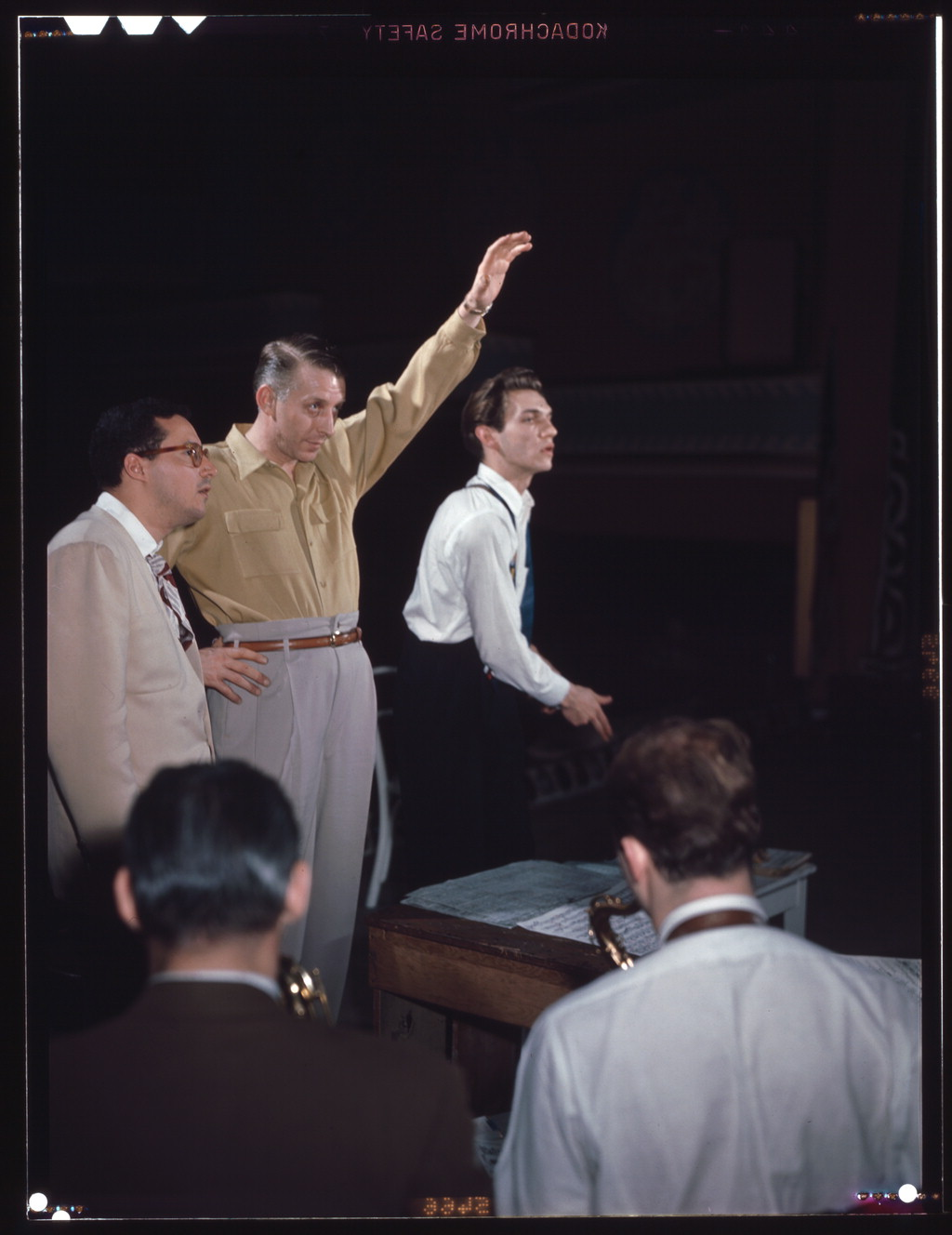
(From left:) Pete Rugolo, Stan Kenton, and Bob Graettinger. Photograph by William P. Gottlieb.

City of Glass and the whole body of work from the Stan Kenton orchestra and Robert Graettinger (1947–1953) is a direct product of the experimental American music scene of the post World War II era. Though overshadowed historically by other compositional endeavours in jazz at the time attributed to George Russell, Neal Hefti or Lennie Tristano, Graettinger and City of Glass is important in the progress that was to be part of third stream jazz.

This overall period of the Kenton orchestra (1947–1953) was the most innovative and fertile in terms of purely artistic output. Stan Kenton had reformed his orchestra in September 1947 with the avowed intention of playing "progressive" jazz designed specifically for the concert hall. Graettinger's music (as well as Pete Rugolo, Manny Albam, William Russo, Franklyn Marks, and Shorty Rogers) involves a great artistic departure for Kenton so to produce a New American music. City of Glass and those Capitol Records recording sessions become a logical step starting with band leaders such as James Reese Europe, Paul Whiteman, and others earlier attempting to elevate the art form of jazz beyond just "hot jazz" and jam session playing. There is a very clear connection to be made in the progress and innovation of large ensemble music (in both classical and jazz) that Graettinger's opus's fit into and would not just 'appear out of nowhere.' Contemporaries of the Kenton/Graettinger collaboration during that time such as Ralph Burns with Woody Herman, Boyd Raeburn (w/Eddie Finckel and George Handy) and Claude Thornhill (w/Gil Evans) help to clarify the important place where City of Glass sits in jazz history, though Graettinger's output and fame was affected by the AF of M recording ban (as compared to those other writers). The City of Glass sessions are part of a bigger portrait making Graettinger an important figure in the painting. Better than any other writer, Robert Graettinger fulfilled Kenton's aspirations to establish a New American Music.

== Graettinger's music and the recordings of Stan Kenton ==
=== "Thermopolae": Bob Graettinger's first recording with Kenton ===
Robert Graettinger's "Thermopolae" (from the City of Glass CD) is the first Graettinger work recorded by the Kenton Orchestra (December 1947); the title referring to the famous Battle of Thermopylae fought in 480 BC between the Greeks and Persians. Venudor's and Cox's comparison to Alexander Mosolov's Iron Foundry is not too far off but "Thermopolae" can better be compared to Italian Futurism music as well as larger more involved movements of Duke Ellington and Billy Strayhorn's suites of the time (George Antheil's music would be another). Graettinger's treatment of the sax section juxtaposed against the straight 8th note pulse with Weidler's muscular "Hodgesesque" lead alto playing places the work firmly in the camp of Ellington's "Jungle Music"; the influence of Benny Carter's playing and writing is clearly evident also.

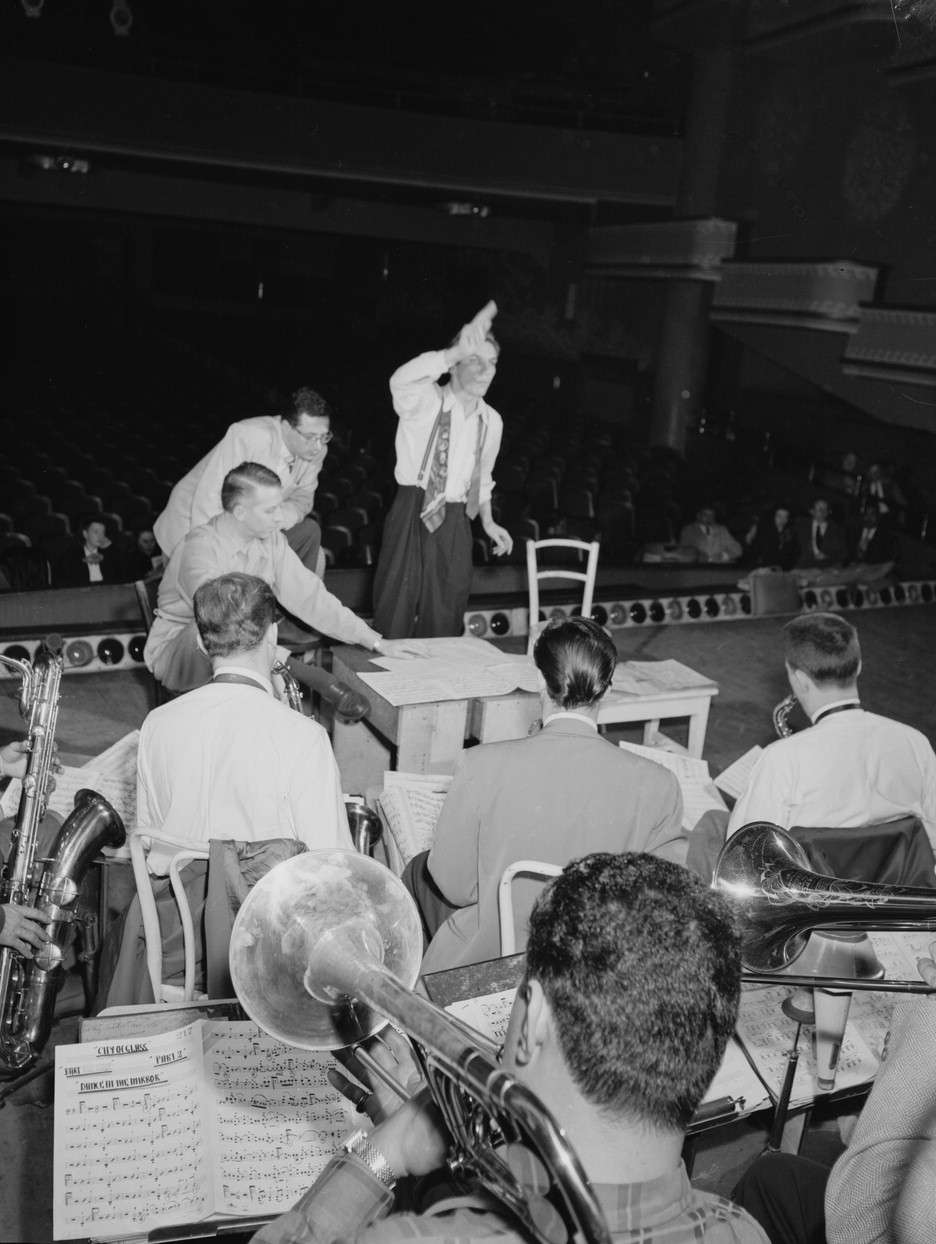
Bob Graettinger conducting while Stan Kenton and Pete Rugolo look on, late 1947

Graettinger's intention is far closer to jazz than to the modernism of Russians or any classical music of the time; this makes it no less innovative but merely assigns the lineage to a more accurate place. Second alto saxophonist/clarinetist Art Pepper sums up the comparison to Ellington this way, "... Graettinger didn't just write for a band, or for sections; he wrote for each individual person, more or less as Ellington did. It was so difficult to play because you were independent of the guy next to you."

=== Graettinger's vocal arranging and June Christy ===
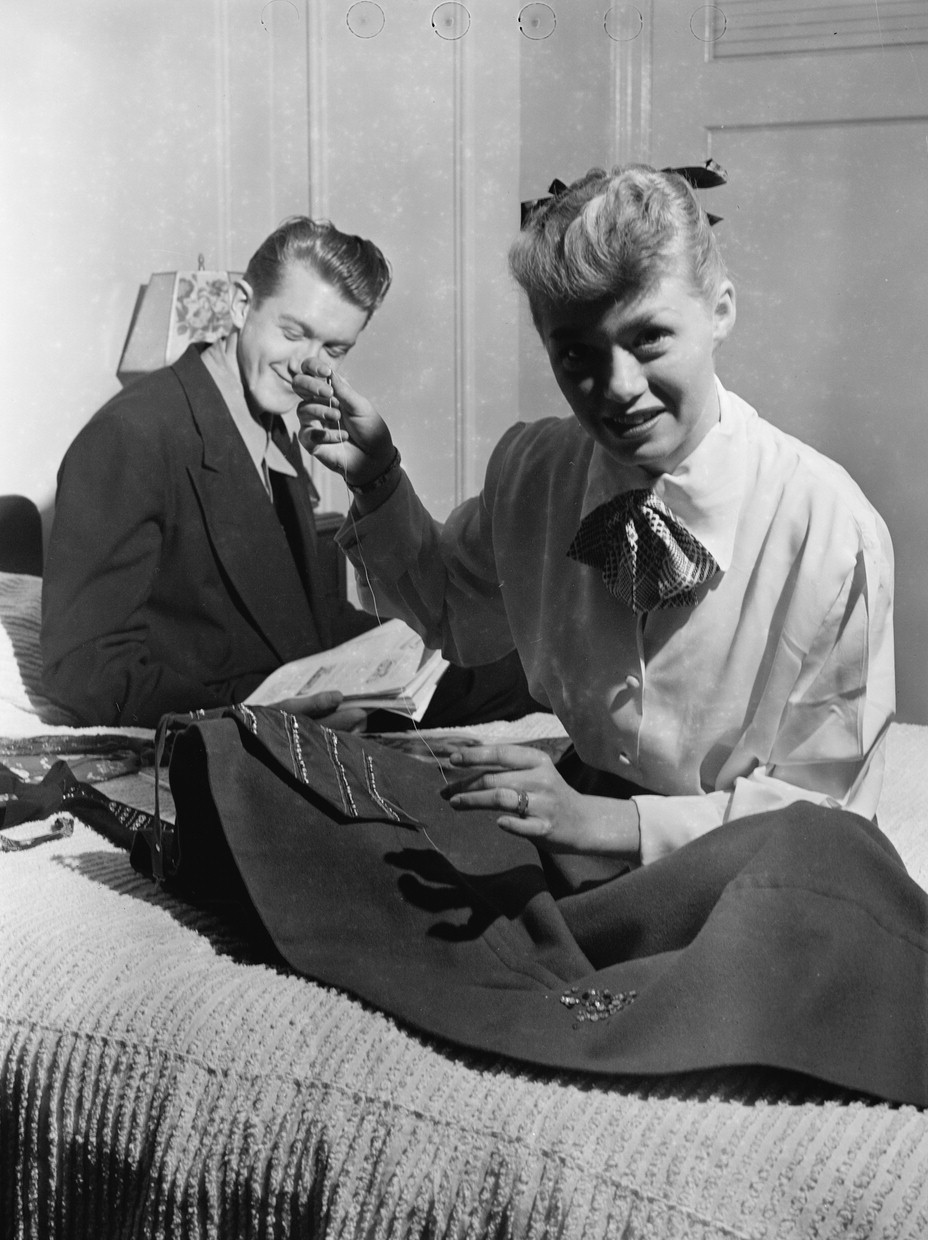
June Christy with Bob Cooper circa 1948

The arrangement of Matt Dennis's "Everything Happens to Me" (June Christy, vocal) was not done under Kenton's aegis but with Christy's later to be husband Bob Cooper as the leader just after the second AFM recording ban. This is added to the CD and shows the continuity of Graettinger's writing and recorded works for Capitol; the chart had originally been done for the full Kenton instrumentation but was never recorded. The small 11 piece group (to include violin and cello) provides some real insight to the inner workings of Graettinger's writing. The austere nature of his arrangement and use of pantonality (one might call it atonality in spots) makes one wonder how June Christy is able to pick off the 9th of the F minor chord at the top of the tune; there is basically no clue given by Graettinger as to what pitch is coming for the singer (the glue that holds this together is the Bb pedal point at the bottom). After first stating the entire tune there is a tutti ensemble section that gives way to the 'last 'A' of the form'. Also, his harmonic transitions between sections are key in their departure from the tune compared to the established harmony while June Christy sings.

=== Kenton's Innovation Orchestra and Graettinger's music ===
Of the works recorded by Capitol Records, "Incident in Jazz" is probably the most compositionally unified of Graettinger's and shows his full capabilities as an orchestral writer in progressive jazz or as a Third stream music composer (the work was originally entitled "Incident in Sound"). This is part of the new "Innovations" orchestra that Stan Kenton had marshalled into the studio to record these groundbreaking sides. Kenton comments on the unprecedented conditions this orchestra operated under, "The Capitol people were with me all the way. There were tremendous sums of money involved in recording this orchestra and selling the music that was of such an unusual nature. I remember hour upon hour in the studio while we were recording, and there was no thought of how much it would cost: the thought was only to make the finest recordings that we knew how." The largesse of Capitol Records and Kenton himself would only last (roughly) six months until a more conventional, financially solvent Kenton 'dance' orchestra would be reformed to cut sides with the popular Capitol artist Nat King Cole. Graettinger's "House of Strings" (Aug 24, 1950) is recorded on a split session with popular Les Baxter sides; the Kenton 'Innovations Orchestra' as a regular touring and studio unit had come and gone quickly due to financial failure.

The work itself spurns a sense of symmetry and order that the other composers on the Innovations in Modern Music release adhere to. Graettinger's lack of sequential pattern and deliberative asymmetry is never frivolous due to the atonal orchestration. The work ends on a tranquil note like many other of his works. "Incident in Jazz" commented Holleck, "is modern music, heart deep."

=== City of Glass ===
Original 10" cover for City of Glass

After a year's hiatus from the recording of Graettinger's works, both producer Lee Gillette and Stan Kenton were able to cajole a reluctant Capitol Records management into assembling a 1951 version of the 'Innovations Orchestra' to record. The group's studio time on December 5 and 7 was entirely devoted to Graettinger's music; primarily the four movement City of Glass suite (add "A HORN" from This Modern World). This was the rewritten version of a composition first scored for Kenton's Progressive Jazz Orchestra in 1948. It was premiered, and received its sole performances, at the Civic Opera House in Chicago on April 20 and 21, 1948, with the composer conducting (the reception of the premiere by public was quite indifferent). Olivier Messiaen's "Mode de Valeurs et Dintensites" (1949) comes to mind with the first opening music of Graettinger's Entrance Into The City (in two parts). The 'jagged edges' (akin to Anton Webern) and use of free dissonance by each composer while (simultaneously) writing across the Atlantic from one another are notable. In essence, the same effect was being achieved with little to no knowledge of one another's work. The second movement (The Structures) is quite effective to the level of Incident in Jazz recorded almost two years before. Both are well balanced works successfully set in jazz 'grooves' juxtaposed to tonal dissonance like George Russell's groundbreaking 1949 "A Bird in Igor's Yard" (also recorded by Capitol during that time). The third and last movement is much more romantic in approach; almost to the point of imagining it being a set of opera scenes from Richard Strauss's Elektra or Alban Berg's Wozzeck (Graettinger was long a fan of opera and ballet). There is some notable lyrical playing by members of the Kenton orchestra in this final movement.

=== This Modern World ===
The remaining works on the CD primarily comprise the later released This Modern World. After City of Glass Stan Kenton would add in an odd Graettinger composition during recording sessions until there was enough to press a second 10-inch LP of new material. This Modern World is varied in scope but lacks greatly what would be real jazz sensibilities; the feature written for Maynard Ferguson entitled A Trumpet (Stan Kenton himself gave it that name) is the only exception on this recording.

Graettinger's trombone feature on the standard "You Go To My Head" is included here and was aimed at the first release of "New Concepts of Artistry in Rhythm." Each piece stands on its own and do not really comprise a unified theme or 'set' of concert works. Some of the works ("A Thought", "Some Saxophones") were not even supervised in the recording process by Stan Kenton himself in that he was out on tour with the orchestra. This would be Graettinger's last tenure with the Stan Kenton recordings in the studio as composer, conductor, or supervisor. After this recording Graettinger's output dwindled and only one other piece is known of ("Suite for String Trio and Wind Quartet") and was still unfinished at the time of his death in 1957.

=== Graettinger's legacy and the Stan Kenton Orchestra ===
Bob Graettinger died an untimely death of lung cancer in 1957 at the age of 33; he lived a great deal of his personal life enigmatic and as a loner. By that time he was a forgotten figure and the only musical colleagues to attend his funeral were Stan Kenton and Pete Rugolo. Graettinger's life had been in constant turmoil. Bud Shank is quoted, "Most of us who knew [Bob] figured he died of a broken heart. He lived entirely in his own little world. He could never find anybody to understand him."

Graettinger is quoted, "I've never had a technique to execute my ideas. I work from the idea, and have acquainted myself with the physical laws of sound. I use a different technique for each idea." He elaborates further, "The way I hear music is a series of constantly changing tensions. What I hear isn't individual melodies or harmonies, but something more like abstract shapes in motion."

While audiences simply reacted with their feet to his music, a kind of romanticism grew up around Graettinger that had protected him from the criticism of his peers. His total lack of interest in material possessions leading to very primitive living conditions, his method of writing music colors to illustrate the different instruments (much like Duke Ellington), and his total dedication to his music above all else, ensured the admiration of other musicians.

There is never complete agreement about music as controversial as City of Glass, only a consensus on either side. Asked by English record aficionado Colin Goodall, trumpeter Buddy Childers was explicit: "Either you do have the intellectual capacity to appreciate the music, or it is bullshit,"... so Childers was asked his opinion, "It's bullshit." Stan Kenton adamantly defended Graettinger's music but later had his doubts. Stan Kenton, "Well, I tell ya, it was either the greatest music the band ever presented, or the biggest pile of crap we ever played, and I still do not know which."

== Reception ==
Professional ratings
Review scores
Source	Rating
AllMusic	4.5/5 stars
Billboard; Nov. 1, 1952	#9 sales for Capitol Records
Billboard; Nov. 22, 1952	#6 sales for Capitol Records
Down Beat; Jan. 28, 1953	performance recording
The Penguin Guide to Jazz	4/4 stars

The album has been critically well received and many reviews in books written about jazz and classical music place City of Glass as a breakthrough and milestone in American music. The Penguin Guide to Jazz numbers it among the "core collection" which jazz fans should possess. Scott Yanow's AllMusic review states "The 16 pieces arranged by Bob Graettinger which make up this CD number among the most exacting works Kenton was ever responsible for. Graettinger's two major pieces, "City of Glass" and "This Modern World" are extraordinary works".

== Track listing ==
All tracks are written by Robert Graettinger except where noted. All tracks arranged by Graettinger.

No.	Title	Writer(s)	Length
1.	"Thermopolae"		2:53
2.	"Everything Happens to Me"	Tom Adair; Matt Dennis	2:59
3.	"Incident in Jazz"		3:26
4.	"House of Strings"		4:15
5.	"A Horn"		4:04
6.	"City of Glass (1st Movement-Part 1): Entrance into the City"		4:30
7.	"City of Glass (1st Movement-Part 2): The Structures"		3:46
8.	"City of Glass (2nd Movement): Dance Before the Mirror"		4:22
9.	"City of Glass (3rd Movement): Reflections"		3:53
10.	"Modern Opus"		3:14
11.	"A Cello"		4:59
12.	"You Go to My Head"	J. Fred Coots; Haven Gillespie	3:20
13.	"A Trumpet"		4:46
14.	"An Orchestra"		4:03
15.	"A Thought"		4:52
16.	"Some Saxophones"		3:13
Total length:			1:03:15

- Track 1 was first issued on Capitol T-172, A Presentation of Progressive Jazz! LP (1950)
- Track 2 was never issued
- Track 3 was first issued on Capitol T-189, Innovations In Modern Music LP (1950)
- Track 4 was first issued on Capitol T-248, Stan Kenton Presents LP (1951)
- Track 5, 11, 13–16 were first issued on Capitol H-460, This Modern World 10-inch LP (1953)
- Track 6–9 were first issued on Capitol H-353, City of Glass 10-inch LP (1952)
- Track 10 and 12 were first issued on Capitol T-569, The Kenton Era LP set (1954)

== Recording sessions ==
- Dec. 6, 1947 in New York City at RKO-Pathe Studios :Track 1
- March 28, 1949, in Hollywood, CA. at Capitol Studios :Track 2
- February 4, 1950, in Hollywood, CA. at Capitol Studios :Track 3
- Aug. 24, 1950 in Hollywood, CA. at Capitol Studios :Track 4
- Dec. 5 and 7, 1951 in Hollywood, CA. at Capitol Studios :Tracks 5–9
- March 19 and 20, 1952 in Hollywood, CA. at Capitol Studios : Track 10–11
- September 15, 1952, in Chicago, Ill. at Universal Studios :Track 12
- February 11, 1953, in Hollywood, CA. at Capitol Studios :Tracks 13–14
- May 28, 1953, in Hollywood, CA. at Capitol Studios :Tracks 15–16

== Personnel ==
=== Musicians ===
==== Dec. 6, 1947 ====
- Conductor – Stan Kenton
- Alto saxophone – George Weidler, Art Pepper
- Tenor saxophone – Bob Cooper, Warner Weidler
- Baritone saxophone – Bob Gioga
- Trumpet – Buddy Childers, Al Porcino, Harry Betts, Chico Alvarez, Ken Hanna
- Trombone – Milt Bernhart, Eddie Bert, Harry Betts, Harry Forbes, Bart Varsalona (bass)
- Guitar – Laurindo Almeida
- Bass – Eddie Safranski
- Drums – Shelly Manne
- Bongos – Jack Costanza

==== March 28, 1949 ====
- Vocal – June Christy
- Violin – Jasper Hornyack
- Alto saxophone – Art Pepper
- Tenor saxophone – Bob Cooper
- Baritone saxophone – Irv Roth
- Trumpet – Buddy Childers
- Bass Trumpet – Johnny Mandel
- Trombone – Billy Byers
- Cello – Cesare Pascarella
- Piano – Hal Schaeffer
- Bass – Joe Mondragon
- Drums – Don Lamond

==== February 4, 1950 ====
- Conductor – Stan Kenton
- Alto saxophone – George Weidler, Art Pepper
- Tenor saxophone – Bob Cooper, Warner Weidler
- Baritone saxophone – Bob Gioga
- Trumpet – Buddy Childers, Maynard Ferguson, Shorty Rogers, Chico Alvarez, Don Palandino
- Trombone – Milt Bernhart, Eddie Bert, Harry Betts, Harry Forbes, Bart Varsalona (bass)
- Guitar – Laurindo Almeida
- Bass – Eddie Safranski
- Drums – Shelly Manne

==== Aug. 24, 1950 ====
- Violin – George Kast, Lew Elias, Jim Cathcart, Earl Cornwell, Anthony Doria, Jim Holmes, Alex Law, Herbert Offner, Carl Ottobrino, Dave Schakne
- Viola – Stan Harris, Leonard Selic, Sam Singer
- Cello – Gregory Bemko, Zachary Bock, Jack Wulfe
- Alto saxophone, flute – Bud Shank
- Alto saxophone, clarinet – Art Pepper
- Tenor saxophone, oboe, English horn – Bob Cooper
- Tenor saxophone, bassoon – Bart Cardarell
- Baritone saxophone, bass clarinet – Bob Gioga
- Trumpet – Buddy Childers, Maynard Ferguson, Shorty Rogers, Chico Alvarez, John Copolla
- Horn – John Graas, Lloyd Otto
- Trombone – Milt Berhart, Harry Betts, Bob Fitzpatrick, Bill Russo, Bart Varsalona (bass)
- Tuba – Gene Englund
- Guitar – Laurindo Almeida
- Piano – Stan Kenton
- Bass – Don Bagley
- Drums – Shelly Manne
- Congas – Carlos Vidal

==== Dec. 5 and 7, 1951 ====
- Violin – Alex Law, Earl Cornwell, Phil Davidson, Barton Gray, Maurice Koukel, Seb Mercurio, Danny Napolitano, Dwight Muma, Charlie Scarle, Ben Zimberoff
- Viola – Paul Israel, Aaron Shapiro, Dave Smiley
- Cello – Gregory Bemko, Zachary Bock, Gabe Jellen
- Double Bass – Abe Luboff
- Alto saxophone, flute – Bud Shank
- Alto saxophone, clarinet – Art Pepper
- Tenor saxophone, oboe, English horn – Bob Cooper
- Tenor saxophone, bassoon – Bart Cardarell
- Baritone saxophone, bass clarinet – Bob Gioga
- Trumpet – John Howell, Maynard Ferguson, Conte Candoli, Stu Williamson, John Copolla
- Horn – John Graas, Lloyd Otto, George Price
- Trombone – Harry Betts, Bob Fitzpatrick, Bill Russo, Dick Kenney, George Roberts (bass)
- Tuba – Stan Fletcher
- Guitar – Sal Salvador
- Piano – Stan Kenton
- Bass – Don Bagley
- Drums – Stan Levey

==== March 19, 1952 ====
- Alto saxophone – Dick Meldonian, Lennie Niehaus
- Tenor saxophone – Bill Holman, Lee Elliot
- Baritone saxophone – Bob Gioga
- Trumpet – Buddy Childers, Clyde Reasinger, Conte Candoli, Don Dennis, Ruben McFall
- Horn – John Graas, Lloyd Otto
- Trombone – Bob Fitzpatrick, Bill Russo, John Halliburton, Gerald Finch, George Roberts (bass)
- Guitar – Ralph Blaze
- Conductor – Stan Kenton
- Bass – Don Bagley
- Drums – Frank Capp

==== March 20, 1952 ====
- Cello – Gregory Bemko
- Alto saxophone, clarinet – Dick Meldonian
- Alto saxophone, oboe – Lennie Niehaus
- Tenor saxophone, English horn – Bob Cooper
- Tenor saxophone, bassoon – Bart Cardarell
- Baritone saxophone, bass clarinet – Bob Gioga
- Horn – John Graas, Lloyd Otto, Fred Fox
- Bass – Don Bagley
- Drums, tympani – Frank Capp

==== September 15, 1952 ====
- Conductor – Stan Kenton
- Alto saxophone – Vinnie Dean, Lee Konitz
- Tenor saxophone – Bill Holman, Richie Kamuca
- Baritone saxophone – Bob Gioga
- Trumpet – Buddy Childers, Maynard Ferguson, Conte Candoli, Don Dennis, Ruben McFall, Pete Candoli
- Trombone – Bob Burgess, Frank Rosolino, Bill Russo, Keith Moon, George Roberts (bass)
- Guitar – Sal Salvador
- Piano – Stan Kenton
- Bass – Don Bagley
- Drums – Stan Levey

==== February 11, 1953 ====
Same as September 15, 1952 but add Pete Candoli to trumpets.

==== May 28, 1953 ====
- Conductor – Robert Graettinger
- Alto saxophone, flute – Bud Shank
- Alto saxophone – Herb Geller
- Tenor saxophone, oboe, English horn – Bob Cooper
- Tenor saxophone, clarinet, bassoon – Bart Calderell
- Baritone saxophone – John Rotella
- Horn – John Graas (on 15 only)

=== Production ===
- Producer: (1,3,4) Jim Conkling, (2) Bob Cooper, (5–16) Lee Gillette
- Re-issue producer (CD): Michael Cuscuna
- Digital transfers and mastering (CD): Malcolm Addey
- CD design: Patrick Roques and Lisa Cuscuna
- Liner notes: Max Harrison and Gunther Schuller

== See also ==
- Stan Kenton
- Robert Graettinger
- Third stream jazz
