= The Innovations Orchestra =

Compilation album by Stan Kenton and the Innovations Orchestra
- Released: 1997
- Recorded: February 3, 5 & 5, May 18, June 5 and August 21 & 24, September 12, 1950, and September 19 and October 12, 1951
- Studio: Capitol Recording Studios, Melrose Avenue, Hollywood, CA and Cornell University, Ithaca, New York
- Genre: Jazz
- Length: 120:26
- Label: Capitol CDP 7243
- Producer: Jim Conkling

The Innovations Orchestra is a compilation album by pianist and bandleader Stan Kenton's "Innovations" Orchestra featuring performances recorded in 1950 and 1951. The CD includes the albums Innovations in Modern Music and Stan Kenton Presents and was released by Capitol in 1997.

== Reception ==
Professional ratings
Review scores
Source	Rating
Allmusic	5/5 stars
The Penguin Guide to Jazz Recordings	4/4 stars

The Allmusic review by Scott Yanow observed, "The music was quite uncommercial, complex, and advanced with the emphasis on the arrangements rather than the soloists". In All About Jazz William Grim wrote, "The Innovations Orchestra was quite capable of swinging and it did much of the time. But it was also capable of producing music of an extraordinarily high quality that makes one think in addition to making one's toes tap".

== Track listing ==
Disc one

1. "Mirage" (Pete Rugolo) – 4:59
2. "Conflict" (Rugolo) – 4:27
3. "Solitaire" (Bill Russo) – 4:17
4. "Soliloquy" (Johnny Richards) – 4:33
5. "Theme for Sunday" (Stan Kenton) – 5:04
6. "Amazonia" (Laurindo Almeida) – 4:39
7. "The Lonesome Road" (Nathaniel Shilkret, Gene Austin) – 4:30
8. "Trajectories" (Franklyn Marks) – 3:34
9. "Incident in Jazz" (Robert Graettinger) – 3:31
10. "Cuban Episode" (Chico O'Farrill) – 4:46
11. "Evening in Pakistan" (Franklyn Marks) – 3:44
12. "Salute" (Rugolo) – 3:35
13. "Mardi Gras" (Almeida, Marion Sunshine") – 3:07
14. "In Veradero" (Neal Hefti) – 4:18
15. "Jolly Rogers" (Shorty Rogers) – 2:40
16. "Blues in Riff" (Rugolo) – 2:53

Disc two

1. "Cello-logy" (Almeida) – 4:35
2. "Art Pepper" (Rogers) – 5:19
3. "Halls of Brass" (Russo) – 5:01
4. "Maynard Ferguson" (Rogers) – 4:18
5. "Shelly Manne" (Kenton) – 4:30
6. "June Christy" (Kenton) – 4:08
7. "House of Strings" (Robert Graettinger) – 4:18
8. "Round Robin" (Rogers) – 2:41
9. "Coop's Solo" (Rogers) – 3:15
10. "Sambo" (Rogers) – 2:38
11. "Ennui" (Russo) [live version] – 3:39
12. "Samana" (Manny Albam) [live version] – 3:51
13. "Coop's Solo" (Rogers) [live version] – 3:41
14. "Salute" (Rugolo) [live version] – 4:04

Recorded at Capitol Recording Studios in Hollywood, CA on February 3, 1950 (Disc One: tracks 1–6), February 4, 1950 (Disc One tracks 7–11), February 5, 1950 (Disc One: tracks 12–16), May 18, 1950 (Disc Two: tracks 1–3), June 5, 1950 (Disc Two: tracks 4 & 5) August 21, 1950 (Disc Two: track 6), August 24, 1950 (Disc Two: track 7), September 12, 1950 (Disc Two: track 8), and September 19, 1951 (Disc Two: tracks 9 & 10); and at Cornell University, Ithaca, New York on October 14, 1951 (Disc Two: tracks 11–14)

== Personnel ==
- Stan Kenton – piano, arranger
- Alfred "Chico" Alvarez (tracks: 1–1 to 1–5, 1–7 to 1–16, 2–2, 2–4, 2–5, 2–8), Buddy Childers (tracks: 1–1 to 1–5, 1–7 to 1–16, 2–2, 2–4, 2–5), Conte Candoli (tracks 2–9 to 2–14), John Coppola (tracks 2–9 to 2–14), Maynard Ferguson (tracks: 1–1 to 1–5, 1–7 to 1–16, 2–2, 2–4, 2–5, 2–8 to 2–14), John Howell (tracks 2–8 to 2–14), Don Paladino (tracks 1–1 to 1–5, 1–7 to 1–16, 2–2, 2–4, 2–5), Shorty Rogers (tracks: 1–1 to 1–5, 1–7 to 1–16, 2–2, 2–4, 2–5, 2–8), Stu Williamson (tracks 2–9 to 2–14) – trumpet
- Milt Bernhart (tracks: 1–1 to 1–5, 1–7 to 1–16, 2–2, 2–4, 2–5, 2–8), Harry Betts (tracks 1–1 to 1–5, 1–7 to 1–16, 2–2, 2–4, 2–5, 2–8 to 2–14), Bob Fitzpatrick (tracks 1–1 to 1–5, 1–7 to 1–16, 2–2, 2–4, 2–5, 2–8 to 2–14), Dick Kenney (tracks 2–9 to 2–14), Bill Russo (tracks 1–1 to 1–5, 1–7 to 1–16, 2–2, 2–4, 2–5, 2–8 to 2–14) – trombone (tracks 1–4, 7 & 8)
- Clyde Brown (tracks 2-2, 2–4, 2–5), George Roberts (tracks 2–9 to 2–14), Bart Varsalona (tracks 1–1 to 1–5, 1–7 to 1–16, 2–8) – bass trombone
- Stan Fischer – tuba (tracks 2–11 to 2–14)
- Bud Shank - alto saxophone, flute (tracks 1–1 to 1–5, 1–7 to 1–16, 2–2, 2–4, 2–5, 2–8 to 2–14)
- Art Pepper – alto saxophone, clarinet (tracks 1–1 to 1–5, 1–7 to 1–16, 2–2, 2–4, 2–5, 2–8 to 2–14)
- Bob Cooper – tenor saxophone, oboe, English horn (tracks 1–1 to 1–5, 1–7 to 1–16, 2–2, 2–4, 2–5, 2–8 to 2–14)
- Bart Caldarell – tenor saxophone, bassoon (tracks 1–1 to 1–5, 1–7 to 1–16, 2–2, 2–4, 2–5, 2–8 to 2–14)
- Bob Gioga – baritone saxophone, bass clarinet (tracks 1–1 to 1–5, 1–7 to 1–16, 2–2, 2–4, 2–5, 2–11 to 2–14)
- Jim Cathcart (tracks 1–1 to 2–2, 2–7), Earl Cornwell (tracks 1–1 to 2–2, 2–7, 2–11 to 2–14), Phil Davidson (tracks 2–11 to 2–14), Lew Elias (tracks 1–1 to 2–2, 2–7), Barton Gray (tracks 2–11 to 2–14), Jim Holmes (tracks 1–1 to 2–2, 2–7), Seb Mercurio (tracks 2–11 to 2–14), George Kast (tracks 1–1 to 2–2, 2–7), Maurice Koukel (tracks 2–11 to 2–14), Alex Law (tracks 1–1 to 2–2, 2–7, 2–11 to 2–14), Dwight Muma (tracks 2–11 to 2–14), Danny Napolitano (tracks 2–11 to 2–14), Herbert Offner (tracks 1–1 to 2–2, 2–7), Carl Ottobrino (tracks 1–1 to 2–2, 2–7), Charlie Scarle (tracks 2–11 to 2–14), Dave Schackne (tracks 1–1 to 2–2, 2–7), Ben Zimberoff (tracks: 2–11 to 2–14) – violin
- Stan Harris (tracks 1–1 to 2–2, 2–7), Paul Israel (tracks 2–11 to 2–14), Leonard Selic (tracks 1–1 to 2–2, 2–7), Aaron Shapiro (tracks 2–11 to 2–14), Sam Singer (tracks 1–1 to 2–2, 2–7), Dave Smiley (tracks 2–11 to 2–14) – viola
- Gregory Bemko (tracks 1–1 to 2–2, 2–7, 2–11 to 2–14), Zachary Bock (tracks 1–1 to 2–2, 2–7, 2–11 to 2–14), Gabe Jellen (tracks 2–11 to 2–14), Jack Wolfe (tracks 1–1 to 2–2, 2–7) – cello (tracks 1–4 & 6–8)
- Laurindo Almeida (tracks 1–1 to 2–2, 2–4 to 2–6), Ralph Blaze (tracks 2–8 to 2–14) – guitar
- Don Bagley (tracks 1–1 to 2–2, 2–4 to 2–6, 2–8 to 2–14), Abe Luboff (tracks 2–11 to 2–14) – bass
- Shelly Manne – drums, tympani (tracks 1–1 to 2–6, 2–8 to 2–14)
- Carlos Vidal – congas (tracks 1–1 to 2–2)
- Nestor Amaral, Ivan Lopez, José Olivera, Stenio Ozorio – percussion, vocals (tracks 1–13, 1–14)
- June Christy – vocals (tracks 1–2, 1–7 & 2–6)
