= Popular Favorites by Stan Kenton =

Compilation album by Stan Kenton
- Released: 1953
- Recorded: September 12, 1950 – January 22, 1953
- Studio: Capitol, Hollywood
- Genre: Jazz
- Label: Capitol T 421
- Producer: Lee Gillette

Stan Kenton chronology
New Concepts of Artistry in Rhythm (1952)	Popular Favorites by Stan Kenton (1953)	Sketches on Standards (1953)

Popular Favorites by Stan Kenton is a compilation album by pianist and bandleader Stan Kenton featuring performances recorded between 1951 and 1953 and originally released as a 10-inch LP and 45 rpm EP on Capitol before being reissued as a 12-inch LP with additional tracks in 1955.

== Critical reception ==
Professional ratings
Review scores
Source	Rating
Allmusic	4/5 stars

The Allmusic review by Richard S. Ginell said "This early-LP collection partially documents a period of retrenching after Kenton's Innovations in Modern Music Orchestra took a financial bath. While the album concentrates upon pop standards and an occasional cover of a then-current hit, Capitol also adds some originals from the artist's book, and thus the record becomes a tasty cross-section of the Kenton bands of the early '50s".

== Track listing ==
1. "September Song" (Kurt Weill, Maxwell Anderson) – 3:21
2. "Delicado" (Valdir Azevedo, Jack Lawrence) – 2:26
3. "Dynaflow" (Art Pepper, Stan Kenton) – 3:08
4. "Love for Sale" (Cole Porter) – 3:13
5. "Beehive" (Gene Roland) – 3:06
6. "Francesca" (Sherm Feller) – 2:45
7. "Tenderly" (Walter Gross, Jack Lawrence) – 3:19
8. "Jump for Joe" (Roland) – 3:04
9. "Harlem Nocturne" (Earle Hagen) – 3:08
10. "Taboo" (Margarita Lecuona) – 3:21
11. "Laura" (David Raksin, Johnny Mercer) – 3:20
12. "Stardust" (Hoagy Carmichael, Mitchell Parish) – 3:00
- Recorded at Capitol Recording Studios in Hollywood, CA on September 12, 1950 (track 4), March 20, 1951 (track 1), March 28, 1951 (track 3), May 28, 1951 (track 11), May 31, 1951 (track 8), June 28, 1951 (track 6), January 21, 1952 (track 7), March 18, 1952 (track 12), March 20, 1952 (tracks 2 & 5), September 11, 1952 (track 10) and January 22, 1953 (track 9)

== Personnel ==
- Stan Kenton – piano, conductor
- Alfred "Chico" Alvarez, (tracks 1, 3, 4, 6, 8 & 11), Conte Candoli (tracks 2, 5, 7, 9, 10 & 12), Pete Candoli (track 7), Buddy Childers (tracks 2, 5, 6, 9, 10 & 12), Don Dennis (tracks 2, 5, 9, 10 & 12), Maynard Ferguson (tracks 1, 3, 4 & 6- 11), John Howell (tracks 1, 3, 4, 6, 8 & 11), Ruben McFall (tracks 2, 5, 9, 10 & 12), Jerry Munson (track 7), Al Porcino (track 4), Clyde Raesinger (tracks 2, 5, 7 & 12), Shorty Rogers (tracks 1, 3, 4, 6, 8 & 11), Jimmy Salko (tracks 8 & 11), Ray Wetzel (tracks 1 & 3) – trumpet
- Milt Bernhart (tracks 1, 3, 4, 6, 8 & 11), Eddie Bert (track 4), Harry Betts (tracks 1, 3, 4, 6–8 & 11), Harold Branch (tracks 2 & 5), Bob Burgess (tracks 9 & 10), Gerald Finch (tracks 2, 5, 7 & 12), Bob Fitzpatrick (tracks 1–8, 11 & 12), Dick Kenney (tracks 1, 3, 6–8 & 11), Keith Moon (tracks 9 & 10), Frank Rosolino (tracks 9 & 10), Bill Russo (tracks 2 5, 9, 10 & 12) – trombone
- John Halliburton – trombone, bass trombone (tracks 1, 3, 6 & 12)
- George Roberts (tracks 2, 5, 7, 9, 10 & 12), Bart Varsalona (track 4), Paul Weigand (tracks 8 & 11) – bass trombone
- John Graas – French horn (track 7)
- Vinnie Dean (tracks 9 & 10), Lee Konitz (tracks 9 & 10), Dick Meldonian (track 2, 5, 7 & 12), Lennie Niehaus (tracks 2, 5 & 12), Art Pepper (tracks 1, 3, 4, 6, 8 & 11), Bud Shank (tracks 1, 3, 4, 6, 8 & 11), Herbie Steward (track 7) – alto saxophone
- Bob Cooper (tracks 1, 3, 4, 6 & 7), Bart Caldarell (tracks 1, 3, 4, 6–8 & 11), Lee Elliot (tracks 2, 5 & 12), Jimmy Giuffre (track 8 & 11), Bill Holman (tracks 2, 5, 9, 10 & 12), Richie Kamuca (tracks 9 & 10) – tenor saxophone
- Bob Gioga – baritone saxophone
- Ralph Blaze (tracks 1–8, 11 & 12), Sal Salvador (tracks 9 & 10) – guitar
- Laurindo Almeida – guitar, cabasa (track 2)
- Don Bagley – bass
- Frank Capp (tracks 2, 5 & 12), Stan Levey (tracks 9 & 10), Shelly Manne (tracks 1, 3, 4, 6–8 & 11) – drums
- Ramon Rivera – congas (track 4)
- Ken Walton – bongos (track 10)
- Vocals by band (tracks 1, 7 & 11)
- Stan Kenton (tracks 1, 3, 7 & 11), Gene Roland (tracks 5, 8 & 10), Pete Rugolo (track 2, 4, 6, & 12), Bill Russo (track 9) – arranger
