= The Fantastic Plastic Machine =

1969 film

- Lobby poster for the film Fantastic Plastic Machine
- Directed by: Eric Blum; Lowell Blum
- Release date: 1969

The Fantastic Plastic Machine is a 1969 documentary film following a group of California surfers as they journey to an Australian surfing competition. The film is narrated by Jay North. It was directed by Eric and Lowell Blum, and was filmed in California, Hawaii, Australia, New Zealand and Fiji. The music soundtrack was composed by Harry Betts, and released as an album on Epic Records.

== Cast ==
(In alphabetical order)

- Steve Bigler
- Alan Byrne
- Midget Farrelly
- Ed Farwell
- Skip Frye
- Margo Godfrey
- George Greenough
- Joey Hamasaki
- Russell Hughes
- Peter Johnson
- Robert Lindkvist
- Bob McTavish
- Ken Morrow
- Mickey Munoz
- Jay North
- Mike Purpus
- Ted Spencer
- John Witzig
- Nat Young

== See also ==
- List of American films of 1969
- The Fantastic Plastic Machine – soundtrack to the film, by Harry Betts
