= New Concepts of Artistry in Rhythm =

Studio album by Stan Kenton
- Released: 1953
- Recorded: September 8–16, 1952
- Genre: Jazz
- Length: 47:36
- Label: Capitol
- Producer: ?

Stan Kenton chronology
City of Glass (1952)	New Concepts of Artistry in Rhythm (1953)	Popular Favorites by Stan Kenton (1953)

Professional ratings
Review scores
Source	Rating
AllMusic	4.5/5 stars
The Penguin Guide to Jazz Recordings	3.5/4 stars

New Concepts of Artistry in Rhythm is an album by Stan Kenton. "Invention for Guitar and Trumpet" features guitarist Sal Salvador. A New York Times writer commented in 2003 that composer Bill Russo's "Improvisation" piece was "among the highest achievements in orchestral jazz".

== Track listing ==
=== Original 1953 LP ===
Side A

1. "23°N — 82°W" (Bill Russo)
2. "Portrait of a Count" (Russo)
3. "Invention for Guitar and Trumpet" (Bill Holman)
4. "My Lady" (Russo)
5. "Young Blood" (Gerry Mulligan)
6. "Frank Speaking" (Russo)

Side B

1. "Prologue (This Is an Orchestra!)" (Credited to Stan Kenton, Johnny Richards)
2. "Improvisation" (Russo)

=== 1989 CD reissue ===
1. "Prologue (This Is an Orchestra!)" (Credited to Bill Russo) - 9:57
2. "Portrait of a Count" (Russo) -
3. "Young Blood" (Gerry Mulligan)
4. "Frank Speaking" (Russo)
5. "23°N — 82°W" (Russo)
6. "Taboo"* (Margarita Lecuona, S.K. Russell)
7. "Lonesome Train"* (Gene Roland)
8. "Invention for Guitar and Trumpet" (Bill Holman)
9. "My Lady" (Russo)
10. "Swing House"* (Mulligan)
11. "Improvisation" (Russo)
12. "You Go to My Head"* (J. Fred Coots, Haven Gillespie)

* Tracks 6, 7, 10 and 12 on CD were not part of the original LP but were recorded at the same sessions

== Personnel ==
- Stan Kenton – piano
- Conte Candoli – trumpet
- Buddy Childers – trumpet
- Maynard Ferguson – trumpet
- Don Dennis – trumpet
- Ruben McFall – trumpet
- Bob Fitzpatrick – trombone
- Keith Moon – trombone
- Frank Rosolino – trombone
- Bill Russo – trombone
- George Roberts – bass trombone
- Lee Konitz – alto saxophone
- Vinnie Dean – alto saxophone
- Richie Kamuca – tenor saxophone
- Bill Holman – tenor saxophone
- Bob Gioga – baritone saxophone
- Sal Salvador – guitar
- Don Bagley - bass
- Stan Levey – drums
- Derek Walton – conga
- Kay Brown – vocals on "Lonesome Train"
