= Portraits on Standards =

Studio album by Stan Kenton
- Released: 1953
- Recorded: July 8, 1953
- Studio: Capitol Recording Studios, Melrose Avenue, Hollywood, CA
- Genre: Jazz
- Label: Capitol H 462
- Producer: Sid Feller

Stan Kenton chronology
This Modern World (1953)	Portraits on Standards (1953)	Kenton Showcase (1954)

Portraits on Standards is an album by pianist and bandleader Stan Kenton with featuring performances of jazz standards recorded in 1953 and originally released on the Capitol label as a 10-inch LP.

== Critical reception ==
Professional ratings
Review scores
Source	Rating
Allmusic	3/5 stars

The Allmusic review by Scott Yanow noted "While most of Stan Kenton's recordings in the 1950s tend to be complex and sometimes bombastic, his versions of standards could often be sentimental and very melodic" and said the music "alternates between ballads and boppish romps, mostly featuring the 1953–1954 orchestra, a band that could often swing hard".

== Track listing ==
1. "You and the Night and the Music" (Arthur Schwartz, Howard Dietz) – 2:43
2. "Reverie" (Claude Debussy) – 2:56
3. "I've Got You Under My Skin" (Cole Porter) – 2:53
4. "Autumn in New York" (Vernon Duke) – 2:41
5. "April in Paris" (Duke, Yip Harburg) – 2:53
6. "How High the Moon" (Morgan Lewis, Nancy Hamilton) – 2:22
7. "Crazy Rhythm" (Irving Caesar, Joseph Meyer, Roger Wolfe Kahn) – 3:02
8. "I Got It Bad (and That Ain't Good)" (Duke Ellington, Paul Francis Webster) – 3:02

== Personnel ==
- Stan Kenton – piano, conductor
- Conte Candoli, Buddy Childers, Don Dennis, Ernie Royal, Don Smith – trumpet
- Bob Burgess, Keith Moon, Frank Rosolino, Tommy Shepard – trombone
- George Roberts – bass trombone
- Don Carone, Lee Konitz – alto saxophone
- Zoot Sims, Ed Wasserman – tenor saxophone
- Tony Ferina – baritone saxophone
- Sal Salvador – guitar
- Don Bagley – bass
- Stan Levey – drums
- Bill Russo – arranger
