= Carlos Vidal Bolado =

Cuban musician (1914–1996)

Carlos Vidal Bolando
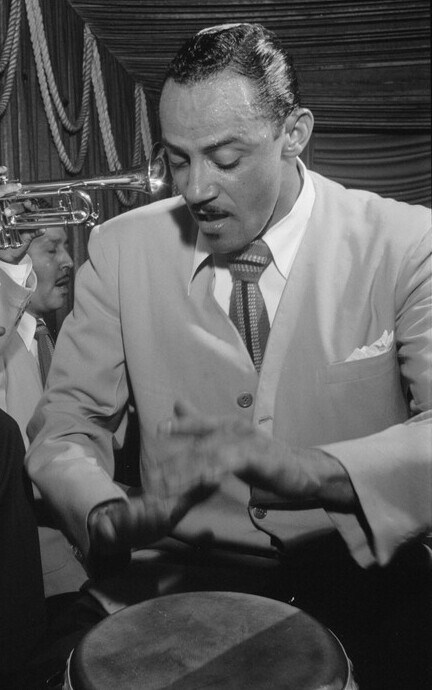
- Vidal on conga at the Glen Island Casino, New York, 1947

Background information
- Born: January 12, 1914; Matanzas, Cuba
- Died: August 24, 1996 Los Angeles, California, U.S.
- Genres: Afro-Cuban jazz; salsa; son cubano; pachanga
- Occupation: Musician
- Instrument: Conga
- Years active: 1930–1970

Carlos Vidal Bolado (1914–1996), also known as "Vidal Bolado", was a Cuban conga drummer and an original member of Machito and his Afro-Cubans. Vidal holds the double distinction of being the first to record authentic folkloric Cuban rumba and the first to play congas in Latin jazz (with Machito and his Afro-Cubans).

== Early career ==
In the 1930s Vidal began performing with the Afro-Cuban Ensemble of Santos Ramírez and with the Casino de la Playa orchestra in and Havana, Cuba.

== Later career ==
In the 1940s and 1950s, Carlos Vidal became one of a handful of Cuban congueros to emigrate to the United States and settled in New York. Other notable congueros who came to the U.S. during that time include Mongo Santamaria, Armando Peraza, Chano Pozo, Francisco Aguabella, Julito Collazo and Cándido Camero. Vidal arrived in the U.S. in 1943, before any of the other previously mentioned musicians.

=== New York ===
In 1943 he is first reported to have performed at the Havana-Madrid Club located on Broadway and 51st Street, with Lilón y Pablito in the group The Four Cuban Diamonds, as a tumbador, dancer and singer. Thereafter he was asked by José Curbelo to play and record with his orchestra, which at that time included Puerto Rican artists Tito Puente and Tito Rodríguez, with whom he recorded songs considered among the first manifestations of mambo in New York.

In 1947 Vidal recorded what are considered the first commercial recordings of rumbas, cumbias, guaguancós and abakuá in the album Afrocubano Rhythm 1, 2, 3 and 4. Produced by Gabriel Oller for the Spanish Music Center (SMC) label the recordings featured Vidal, along with Chano Pozo, Arsenio Rodríguez as well as Miguelito Valdés, Kiki Rodríguez (brother of Arsenio), and Puerto Rican bongero José Mangual Sr.

In 1948, Vidal led an unsuccessful revolt in Machito's Afro-Cubans. However, he failed to convince anyone except Andino to leave the Machito orchestra for better-paying job in Los Angeles. Vidal and Andino joined the Miguelito Valdés orchestra and traveled to Los Angeles, where Andino found that jobs were not all that plentiful.

=== California ===
After his tenure with Machito, in 1948 he joined Stan Kenton's Los Angeles based Progressive Jazz Orchestra with which he recorded anthological songs such as "Cuban Episode" as well as "Incident in Sound" where Vidal shines both in percussion and vocals.

His residency in Los Angeles lead him to play and record with musicians such as Dámaso Pérez Prado, Xavier Cugat, René Touzet, Chico O'Farrill, Anselmo Sacasas, Eartha Kitt, Nat King Cole, Shorty Rogers, Francisco Aguabella, The Four Freshmen, Harry Belafonte, Shorty Rogers, Tadd Dammeron's Big Ten, Miles Davis, Charlie "Bird" Parker, Fats Navarro, pianist Al Haig, and saxophonist Stan Getz, Dexter Gordon, Max Roach and Curly Russell.

In the 1960s he recorded and performed with The Jazz Crusaders, the Estrada Brothers, Poncho Sánchez, Willie Bobo, Vince Guaraldi. He also recorded the classics Yambú and Afroroots phonograms with lead musician Mongo Santamaría along with Armando Peraza, Modesto Durán, Luis Miranda, Francisco Aguabella.

== Selected discography ==
=== As leader ===
- Voodoo Drums (SMC, 1948)
- Congo Drums (Tampa Records, 1956)

=== As sideman ===
With Les Baxter

- Les Baxter's African Jazz (Capitol, 1959)

With Nat King Cole

- Cole Español (Capitol, 1958)
- Nat King Cole Sings/George Shearing Plays (Capitol, 1962)

With The Jazz Crusaders

- Chile Con Soul (Pacific Jazz, 1965)

With Bobby Darin

- Winners (Atco, 1964)
- From Hello Dolly to Goodbye Charlie (Capitol, 1964)

With Stan Kenton

- A Presentation of Progressive Jazz (Capitol, 1948)
- Encores (Capitol, 1949)
- Innovations in Modern Music (Capitol, 1950)
- City of Glass (Capitol, 1951)
- The Kenton Era (Capitol, 1955)

With Charlie Parker and Dizzy Gillespie

- Bird and Diz (Clef, 1952)

With Shorty Rogers

- Afro-Cuban Influence featuring Carlos Vidal & Modesto Duran (RCA Victor, 1958)

With Kitty White

- Sweet Talk (Roulette, 1959)

With Clare Fischer

- Manteca! (Pacific Jazz, 1965)

== Filmography ==
- Cha-Cha-Cha Boom! (1957)

== See also ==
- Afro-Cuban jazz
- Salsa
- Charanga (Cuba)
