= Kenton Showcase =

Studio album by Stan Kenton
- Released: 1954
- Recorded: March 1, 2 & 3, 1954
- Studios: Capitol Recording Studios, Melrose Avenue, Hollywood, CA
- Genre: Jazz
- Label: Capitol H 525/526
- Producer: Lee Gillette

Stan Kenton chronology
Portraits on Standards (1953)	Kenton Showcase (1954)	The Kenton Era (1955)

The Music of Bill Russo Cover

The Music of Bill Holman Cover

Kenton Showcase refers to two 10-inch LPs by bandleader Stan Kenton recorded in early 1954 on Capitol, one each featuring compositions by Bill Holman and Bill Russo. These albums were combined as a 12-inch LP in 1955.

== Critical reception ==
Professional ratings
Review scores
Source	Rating
Allmusic	3/5 stars

The Allmusic review by Scott Yanow states "It's a fine showcase for the two talented writers".

== Track listing ==
All compositions by Bill Russo (tracks 1–8) or Bill Holman (tracks 9–17 & 20) unless noted.

1. "A Theme of Four Values" - 2:51
2. "A Study for Bass" - 3:34
3. "Blues Before and After" - 2:01
4. "Bacante" - 4:20
5. "Thisbe" - 2:49
6. "Egdon Heath" - 3:09
7. "Sweets" - 2:35
8. "Dusk" - 3:21
9. "Bags" - 3:05
10. "Hav-a-Havana" - 2:52
11. "Solo for Buddy" - 2:50
12. "The Opener" - 3:02
13. "Fearless Finlay" - 3:05
14. "Theme and Variations" - 2:45
15. "Kingfish" - 3:08
16. "In Lighter Vein" - 2:42
17. "Of All Things" - 3:18 Bonus track on CD reissue
18. "Lover Man" (Jimmy Davis, Ram Ramirez, Jimmy Sherman) - 4:21 Bonus track on CD reissue
19. "My Funny Valentine" (Richard Rodgers, Lorenz Hart) - 3:17 Bonus track on CD reissue
20. "Bags" [alternate take] - 2:32 Bonus track on CD reissue
- Recorded at Capitol Recording Studios in Hollywood, CA on March 1, 1954 (tracks 14 & 16–19), March 2, 1954 (tracks 1, 4, 8, 10–13 & 15) and March 3, 1954 (tracks 2, 3, 5–7, 9 & 20).

== Personnel ==
- Stan Kenton - piano, conductor
- Buddy Childers - trumpet
- Vic Minichiello - trumpet
- Sam Noto - trumpet
- Don Smith - trumpet
- Stu Williamson - trumpet
- Joe Giavardone - trombone
- Milt Gold - trombone
- Bob Fitzpatrick, Frank Rosolino - trombone
- George Roberts - bass trombone
- Charlie Mariano - alto saxophone
- Dave Schildkraut - alto saxophone
- Mike Cicchetti - tenor saxophone
- Bill Perkins - tenor saxophone
- Tony Ferina - baritone saxophone
- Bob Lesher - guitar
- Don Bagley - bass
- Stan Levey - drums
- Candido Camero - bongos, congas (tracks 4 & 10)
