= The Fantastic Plastic Machine (soundtrack) =

Fantastic Plastic Machine

Soundtrack album by Harry Betts
- Released: 1969
- Recorded: 1969
- Genre: Surf rock
- Length: 30:45
- Label: Epic (U.S.)

Harry Betts chronology
| The Big Mouth (1967) | Fantastic Plastic Machine (1969) | A Time for Dying (1970) |

Professional ratings
Review scores
| Source | Rating |
|---|---|
| Reverb Central | link |

The Fantastic Plastic Machine is the soundtrack to the movie of the same name. It is an album composed and conducted by jazz saxophonist and film scorer Harry Betts. A surf rock album, it is considered a departure from his usual style.

Out of print for decades, the album is considered a collector's item. The album also inspired Japanese recording artist Tomoyuki Tanaka to take the stage name Fantastic Plastic Machine.

== Track listing ==
1. "Theme from 'The Fantastic Plastic Machine'"
2. "Night Flight"
3. "Green-O"
4. "Day Groovin'"
5. "Straight Ahead"
6. "Rock Slide"
7. "McTavish"
8. "Nat's Theme"
9. "Outta Sight"
10. "Green Grotto"
11. "Long Reef"
