= John Graas =

American jazz French horn player and composer

- Born: March 14, 1917; Dubuque, Iowa, U.S.
- Died: April 13, 1962 (aged 45) Los Angeles, California
- Genres: Jazz, third stream
- Occupations: Musician; Composer; Arranger
- Instrument: French horn
- Years active: 1941–1962
- Labels: Trend, Decca, VSOP

John Graas (March 14, 1917 – April 13, 1962) was an American jazz French horn player, composer, and arranger from the 1940s through 1962. He had a short but busy career on the West Coast, and became known as a pioneer of the French horn in jazz.

== Music career ==
Graas was born in Dubuque, Iowa, on March 14, 1917. He was educated in classical music and attended Tanglewood Music Center, where he performed under the tutelage of Serge Koussevitsky. He soon became interested in jazz and studied ways to bring jazz and classical music together, an early effort at what would later be called Third Stream music. Following the path of his dual interests, he was a member of the Indianapolis Symphony Orchestra (1941), the Claude Thornhill Orchestra (1942), the Army Air Corps band during World War II (1942–1945), the Cleveland Orchestra (1945–1946), the Tex Beneke Orchestra (1946–1949), and the Stan Kenton Orchestra (1950–1953).

The 1950s were a period of intense activity by Graas, as performer, composer, and arranger. Besides groups under his own name, he appeared in the musical aggregations of Shorty Rogers, Stan Kenton, Maynard Ferguson, Billy May, Pete Rugolo, Mel Lewis, and others. The 1960s began with equal intensity, including recordings with Henry Mancini, Bobby Darin, Heinie Beau, and others, until his career was cut short by his death of a heart attack, at age 45, in the Van Nuys section of Los Angeles.

== Discography ==
=== As leader ===
- John Graas (Trend, 1953)
- Jazz Studio 2 (Decca, 1954)
- French Horn Jazz (Trend, 1954)
- Jazz Studio 3 (Decca, 1955)
- Jazz Lab 1 (Decca, 1956)
- Jazz Lab 2 (Decca, 1957)
- French Horn Jazz (Kapp, 1957)
- Jazzmantics (Lone Hill, 1958)
- John Graas! (Mercury, 1958)
- International Premiere in Jazz (VSOP, 1958)
- Coup de Graas (1959)

=== As sideman ===
With Benny Carter

- Cosmopolite (Norgran, 1954)

With Stan Kenton

- Innovations in Modern Music (Capitol, 1950)
- Stan Kenton Presents (Capitol, 1950)
- Popular Favorites by Stan Kenton (Capitol, 1953)
- This Modern World (Capitol, 1953)
- The Kenton Era (Capitol, 1940–54, [1955])

With Gerry Mulligan

- Gene Norman Presents the Original Gerry Mulligan Tentet and Quartet (GNP, 1953 [1997])

With Shorty Rogers

- Modern Sounds (Capitol, 1951)
- Shorty Rogers and His Giants (RCA Victor, 1953)
- Cool and Crazy (RCA Victor, 1953)
- Shorty Rogers Courts the Count (RCA Victor, 1954)
- Martians Come Back! (Atlantic, 1955 [1956])
- Way Up There (Atlantic, 1955 [1957])

With Pete Rugolo

- Introducing Pete Rugolo (Columbia, 1954)
- Adventures in Rhythm (Columbia, 1954)
- Rugolomania (Columbia, 1955)
- New Sounds by Pete Rugolo (Harmony, 1954–55, [1957])
- Percussion at Work (EmArcy, 1957)
