= Stan Kenton Presents =

Studio album by Stan Kenton and His Orchestra
- Released: 1950
- Recorded: February 3–4, May 18, June 5 and August 21 & 24, 1950
- Studio: Capitol Recording Studios, Melrose Avenue, Hollywood, CA
- Genre: Jazz
- Label: Capitol L 248
- Producer: Jim Conkling

Stan Kenton chronology
Innovations in Modern Music (1950)	Stan Kenton Presents (1950)	City of Glass (1951)

Stan Kenton Presents is an album by pianist and bandleader Stan Kenton with his "Innovations" Orchestra featuring performances recorded in 1950 and originally released as 78 RPM records and a 10-inch LP on Capitol before being reissued in 12-inch LP format in 1955.

== Reception ==
Professional ratings
Review scores
Source	Rating
Allmusic	4.5/5 stars

The Allmusic review by Scott Yanow observed "The soloists (which also include trombonist Milt Bernhart) are very impressive but it is the writing (by Shorty Rogers, Bill Russo, Frank Marks, Johnny Richards and Kenton himself) that is most startling, combining together aspects of modern classical music with the most advanced forms of jazz".

== Track listing ==
All compositions by Stan Kenton except where noted.

1. "Art Pepper" (Shorty Rogers) – 5:19
2. "Maynard Ferguson" (Rogers) – 4:18
3. "Halls of Brass" (Bill Russo) – 5:01
4. "Evening in Pakistan" (Franklyn Marks) – 3:44 Bonus track on 12-inch LP
5. "June Christy" – 4:08
6. "House of Strings" (Robert Graettinger) – 4:18
7. "Shelly Manne" – 4:30
8. "Soliloquy" (Johnny Richards) – 4:33 Bonus track on 12-inch LP
- Recorded at Capitol Recording Studios in Hollywood, CA on February 3, 1950 (track 8), February 4, 1950 (track 4), May 18, 1950 (tracks 1 & 3), June 15, 1950 (tracks 2 & 7) August 21, 1950 (track 5) and August 24, 1950 (track 6)

== Personnel ==
- Stan Kenton – piano, arranger
- Alfred "Chico" Alvarez, Buddy Childers, Maynard Ferguson, Don Paladino, Shorty Rogers – trumpet (tracks 1–4, 7 & 8)
- Milt Bernhart, Harry Betts, Bob Fitzpatrick, Bill Russo – trombone (tracks 1–4, 7 & 8)
- Clyde Brown (tracks 1–3 & 7), Bart Varsalona (tracks 4 & 8) – bass trombone
- John Graas, Lloyd Otto – French horn (tracks 1–4, 7 & 8)
- Gene Englund – tuba (tracks 1–4, 7 & 8)
- Art Pepper – alto saxophone, clarinet (tracks 1–4, 7 & 8)
- Bud Shank – alto saxophone, flute (tracks 1–4, 7 & 8)
- Bob Cooper – tenor saxophone, oboe, English horn (tracks 1–4, 7 & 8)
- Bart Caldarell – tenor saxophone, bassoon (tracks 1–4, 7 & 8)
- Bob Gioga – baritone saxophone, bass clarinet (tracks 1–4 & 6–8)
- Jim Cathcart, Earl Cornwell, Anthony Doria, Lew Elias, Jim Holmes, George Kast, Alex Law, Herbert Offner, Carl Ottobrino, Dave Schackne – violin (tracks 1–4 & 6–8)
- Stan Harris, Leonard Sclic, Sam Singer – viola (tracks 1–4 & 6–8)
- Gregory Bemko, Zachary Bock, Jack Wulfe – cello (tracks 1–4 & 6–8)
- Laurindo Almeida – guitar (tracks 1–5, 7 & 8)
- Don Bagley – bass (tracks 1–5, 7 & 8)
- Shelly Manne – drums, tympani (tracks 1–5, 7 & 8)
- Carlos Vida – congas (tracks 1–4, 7 & 8)
- Jack Costanzo – percussion (track 5)
- June Christy – vocals (track 5)
