= This Modern World (album) =

Studio album by Stan Kenton
- Released: 1953
- Recorded: December 5, 1951, March 20, 1952, February 11, 1953 and May 28, 1953
- Studio: Capitol, Hollywood
- Genre: Jazz
- Label: Capitol H 460
- Producer: Lee Gillette

Stan Kenton chronology
Sketches on Standards (1953)	This Modern World (1953)	Portraits on Standards (1953)

This Modern World is an album by pianist and bandleader Stan Kenton featuring performances of compositions by Robert Graettinger recorded between 1951 and 1953 and originally released as a 10-inch LP on Capitol as well as a set of three 7 inch 45 rpm singles.

== Critical reception ==
Professional ratings
Review scores
Source	Rating
Allmusic	3/5 stars

The Allmusic review by Richard S. Ginell calls it "the most complex, atonal, uncompromising, potentially alienating music that even the iconoclastic Stan Kenton band ever played" and said "This Modern World moves even further away from jazz into abstract contemporary classical music... A jazz pulse occasionally surfaces but more often instruments drift in atonal clusters past each other in differing meters or blast dissonant fanfares, creating a feeling of unease as they converse quizzically".

== Track listing ==
All compositions by Robert Graettinger.

1. "A Horn" – 4:04
2. "Some Saxophones" – 3:13
3. "A Cello" – 4:59
4. "A Thought" – 4:52
5. "A Trumpet" – 4:46
6. "An Orchestra" – 4:03
- Recorded at Capitol Recording Studios in Hollywood, CA on December 5, 1951 (track 1), March 20, 1952 (track 3), February 11, 1953 (tracks 5 & 6) and May 28, 1953 (tracks 2 & 4)

== Personnel ==
- Stan Kenton – piano, conductor
- Conte Candoli (tracks 1, 5 & 6), Pete Candoli (tracks 5 & 6), Buddy Childers (tracks 5 & 6), John Coppola (track 1), Don Dennis (tracks 5 & 6), Maynard Ferguson (tracks 1, 5 & 6), John Howell (track 1), Ruben McFall (tracks 5 & 6), Stu Williamson (track 1) – trumpet
- Harry Betts (track 1), Bob Burgess (tracks 5 & 6), Bob Fitzpatrick (track 1), Dick Kenney (track 1), Keith Moon (tracks 5 & 6), Frank Rosolino (tracks 5 & 6), Bill Russo (tracks 1, 5 & 6) – trombone
- George Roberts – bass trombone (tracks 1, 5 & 6)
- John Graas (tracks 1, 4 & 6), Lloyd Otto (tracks 1, 4 & 6), George Price (track 1) – French horn
- Stan Fletcher – tuba (track 1)
- Vinnie Dean (tracks 5 & 6), Herb Geller (tracks 2 & 4), Lee Konitz (tracks 5 & 6), Dick Meldonian (track 3), Art Pepper (track 1) – alto saxophone
- Bud Shank – alto saxophone, flute (tracks 1–4)
- Bob Cooper – tenor saxophone, oboe, English horn (tracks 1–4)
- Bart Caldarell – tenor saxophone, clarinet, bassoon (tracks 1–4)
- Bob Gioga – baritone saxophone, bass clarinet (tracks 1, 3, 5 & 6)
- John Rotella – baritone saxophone (tracks 2 & 4)
- Earl Cornwell, Phil Davidson, Barton Gray, Maurice Koukel, Alex Law, Seb Mercurio, Dwight Muma, Danny Napolitano, Charlie Scarle, Ben Zimberoff – violin (track 1)
- Paul Israel, Aaron Shapiro, Dave Smiley – viola (track 1)
- Gregory Bemko (tracks 1 & 3), Zachary Bock (track 1), Gabe Jellen (track 1) – cello
- Ralph Blaze (track 1), Sal Salvador (tracks 5 & 6) – guitar
- Don Bagley (tracks 1, 3, 5 & 6), Abe Luboff (track 1) – bass
- Frank Capp (track 3), Stan Levey (tracks 5 & 6), Shelly Manne (track 1) – drums
