= Alfred "Chico" Alvarez =

Canadian jazz trumpeter (1920–1992)

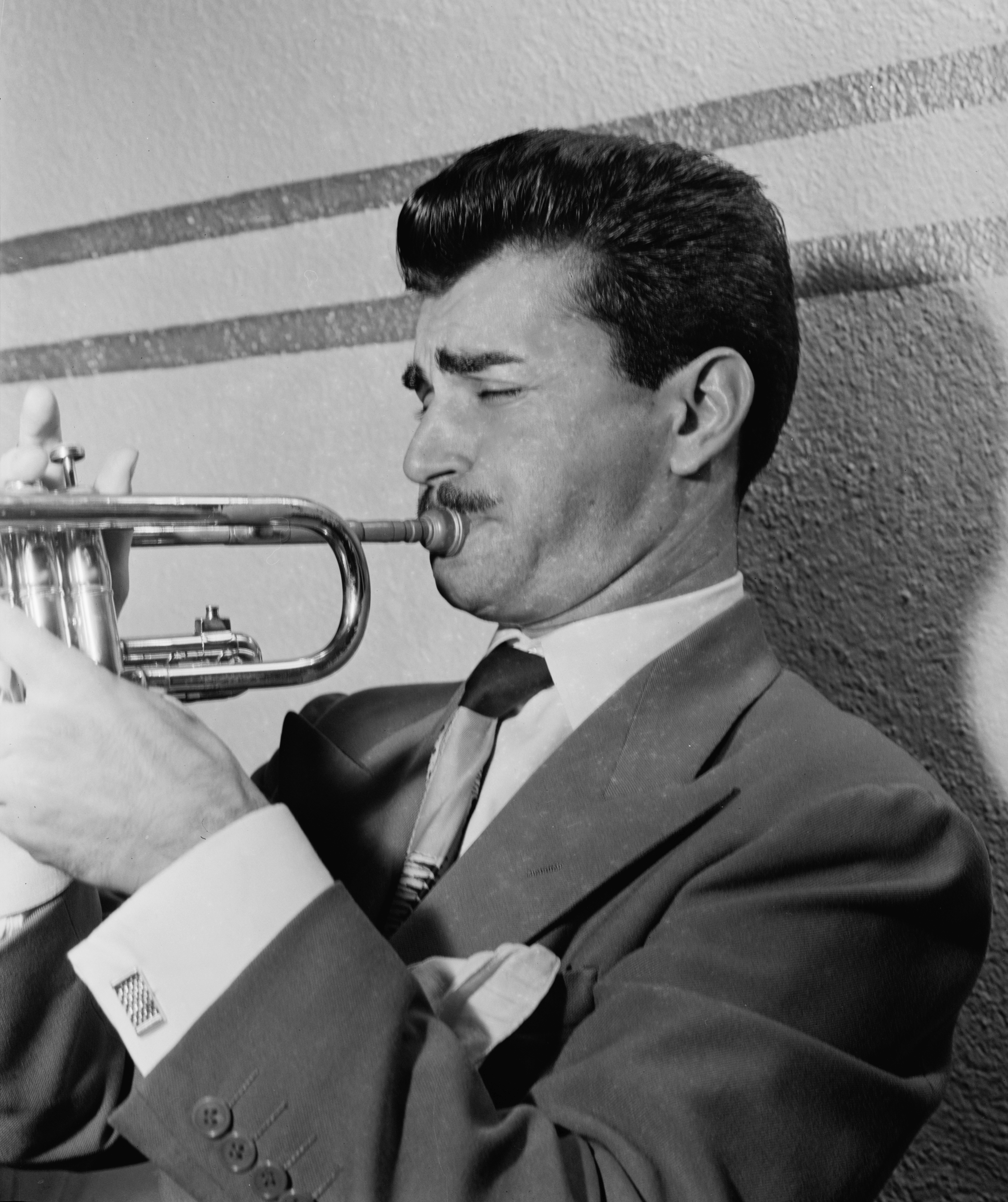
- Chico Alvarez, c. 1947

Background information
- Born: February 3, 1920; Montreal
- Died: August 1, 1992 (aged 72)
- Genres: Orchestral jazz, swing, big band
- Instruments: Trumpet
- Years active: 1946–1990
- Formerly of: Stan Kenton Orchestra, Red Norvo, and Charlie Barnet

Alfred "Chico" Alvarez (February 3, 1920 – August 1, 1992) was a Canadian jazz trumpeter with the Stan Kenton Orchestra and other bands.

== Life ==
Alvarez was born in Montreal, grew up in Southern California. Upon graduation of high school, he attended the Los Angeles Conservatory of Music.

Alvarez was a soloist with the Kenton band from 1941 to 1943 and rejoined the band after Army service in World War II. He also played with the Red Norvo and Charlie Barnet bands, and worked in Las Vegas hotels in the 1960s and 1970s, accompanying singers like Ella Fitzgerald and Sarah Vaughan.

He had been a business agent for the musicians' union, the president of the Allied Arts Council and a member of the Nevada State Council on the Arts.

== Family ==
Alvarez married Eileen Brennan in Los Angeles on December 31, 1949, and they moved to Las Vegas in 1958. They had one daughter, Faith Ann, born on February 8, 1958.

Alvarez had two sons from a previous marriage.

Alvarez' grandson is the American blues guitarist, Alastair Greene.

== Discography ==
With Stan Kenton

- Artistry in Rhythm (Capitol, 1946)
- A Presentation of Progressive Jazz (Capitol, 1947)
- Encores (Capitol, 1949)
- Innovations in Modern Music (Capitol, 1950)
- Stan Kenton Presents (Capitol, 1950)
- Stan Kenton's Milestones (Capitol, 1950)
- Stan Kenton Classics (Capitol, 1952)
- Popular Favorites by Stan Kenton (Capitol, 1953)
- The Kenton Era (Capitol, 1955)
- Stan Kenton: The Formative Years (Brunswick, 1958)
- Balboa/Summer 1941 (1972)
- Live Sessions 1942/1945 (Jazz Anthology, 1977)
- Rendezvous Ballroom 1941 Volume Two (1978)
- Hollywood Bowl 1948 Part One with June Christy (First Heard, 1983)
- Summer of '51 (Garland, 1987)
- Live in 1951 at the Hollywood Palladium Volume 1 (Jazz Band, 1989)
- Innovations Live 1951 (Bandstand, 1992)
- The Innovations Orchestra (Capitol, 1997)
- Live from Sweets Ballroom 1950 with June Christy (Jazz Band, 1997
- The Transcription Performances 1945–46 (Hep, 1997)
- Transcription Performances Vol. 2 (Hep, 1999)
- Easy Go (Capitol, 2001)
- Etude for Saxophones 1941–1942 (Naxos, 2001)

With others

- Nat King Cole, Nat King Cole (Capitol, 1992)
- Bob Keene, Bob Keene and His Orchestra (1988)
- Vido Musso, The Swingin'st (Modern, 1956)
- Patti Page, In the Land of Hi-Fi (1999)
