= Harry Betts =

American musician (1922–2012)

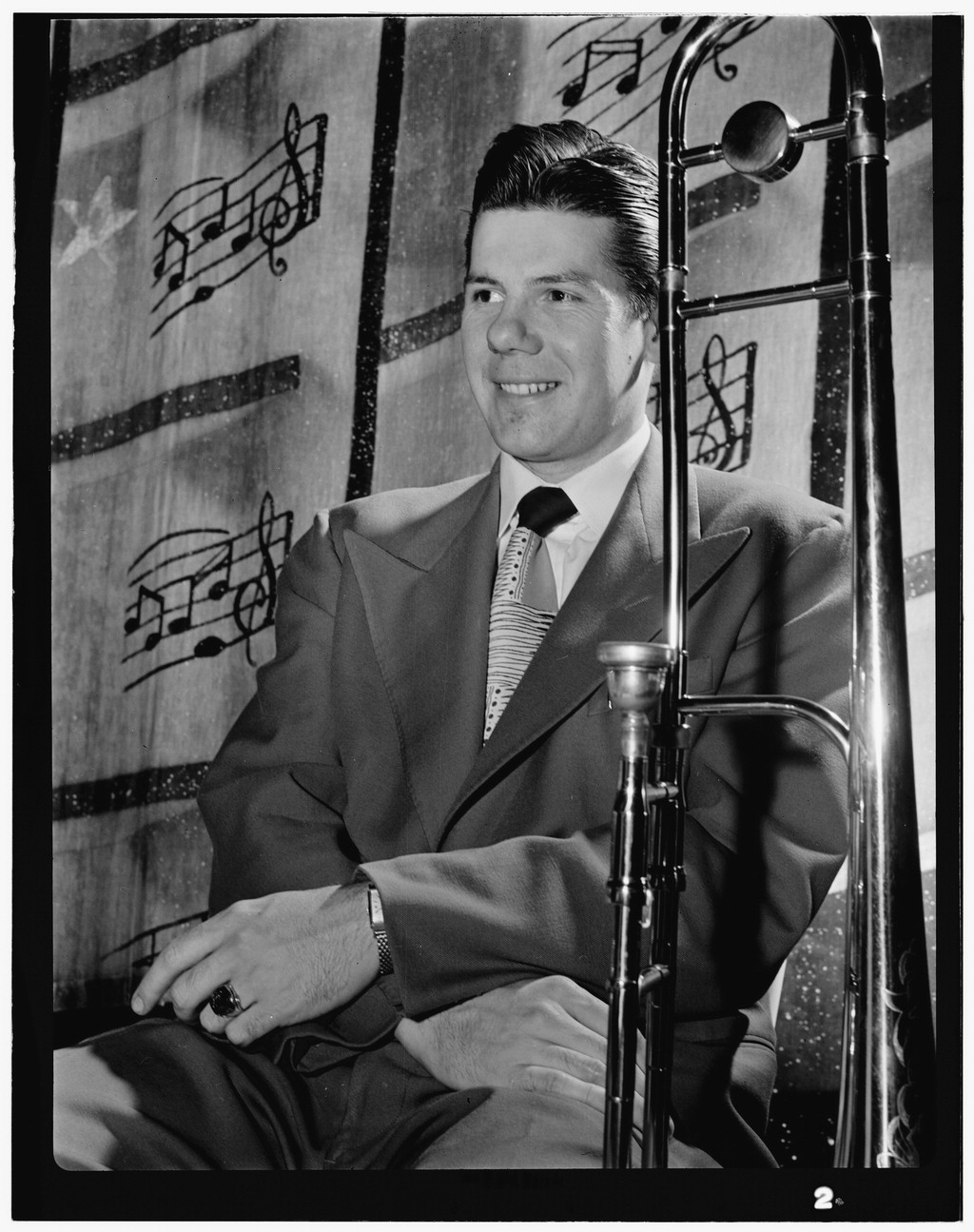
- Betts, c. 1947

Background information
- Born: September 15, 1922; New York, U.S.
- Died: July 13, 2012 (aged 89)
- Genres: Jazz
- Occupations: Musician, arranger
- Instrument: Trombone
- Label: Ava

Harry Betts (September 15, 1922 – July 13, 2012) was an American jazz trombonist.

== Background ==
Born in New York and raised in Fresno, California, he was active as a jazz trombonist and played with Stan Kenton's orchestra in the 1950s. He can be heard on the album Get Happy! (Verve, 1959) by Ella Fitzgerald.

== Music ==
He wrote and orchestrated soundtracks for several films, including A Swingin' Summer (1965), The Big Mouth (1967), A Time for Dying (1969), The Fantastic Plastic Machine (1969), Goodnight, My Love (1972), Black Mama White Mama (1972), Little Cigars (1973) and Nice Dreams (1981). Music from his score to Black Mama White Mama was used in the 2003 soundtrack for Kill Bill, Volume 1. In 1977, he was nominated and won a Grammy Award for Best Instrumental Arrangement - "Nadia's Theme (The Young and the Restless)", with Barry DeVorzon and Perry Botkin Jr.

Aside from his work in scoring, he was known for his numerous arrangements for singer Jack Jones.

== Discography ==
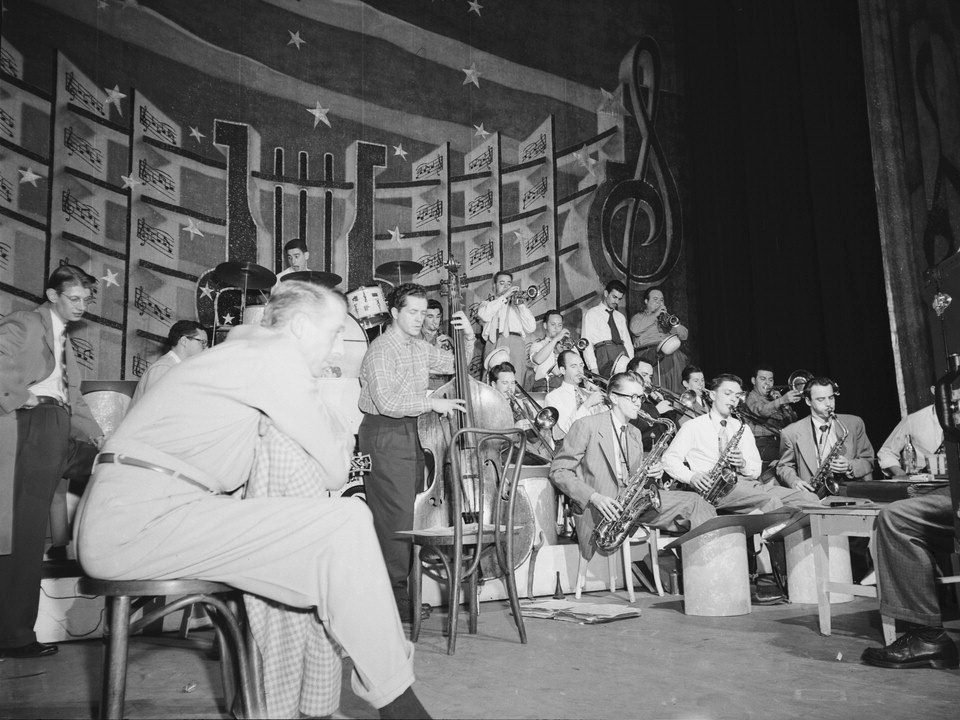
Stan Kenton, Eddie Safranski, Shelly Manne, Chico Alvarez, Ray Wetzel, Harry Betts, Bob Cooper, and Art Pepper, 1947 or 1948

- The Jazz Soul of Dr. Kildare (Ava, 1962)

=== As sideman ===
With Elmer Bernstein

- "The Man with the Golden Arm" (Decca, 1956)

With Bobby Darin

- Venice Blue (Capitol)

With Fred Katz

- Folk Songs for Far Out Folk (Warner Bros., 1958)

With Ray Charles

- The Genius Hits the Road (ABC-Paramount,1960)

With Stan Kenton

- Stan Kenton's Milestones (Capitol, 1943–47 [1950])
- Encores (Capitol, 1947)
- A Presentation of Progressive Jazz (Capitol, 1947)
- Innovations in Modern Music (Capitol, 1950)
- Stan Kenton Presents (Capitol, 1950)
- This Modern World (Capitol, 1953)
- The Kenton Era (Capitol, 1940–54, [1955])
- The Innovations Orchestra (Capitol, 1950–51 [1997])

With Barney Kessel

- Carmen (Contemporary, 1959)

With Shorty Rogers

- Cool and Crazy (RCA Victor, 1953)
- Shorty Rogers Courts the Count (RCA Victor, 1954)
- The Swingin' Nutcracker (RCA Victor, 1960)
- Jazz Waltz (Reprise, 1962)

With Pete Rugolo

- Introducing Pete Rugolo (Columbia, 1954)
- Adventures in Rhythm (Columbia, 1954)
- Rugolomania (Columbia, 1955)
- Rugolo Plays Kenton (EmArcy, 1958)
- 10 Trombones Like 2 Pianos (Mercury, 1960)

== Awards ==
- 1977 - Grammy Award winner - Best Instrumental Arrangement - "Nadia's Theme (The Young and the Restless)", with Barry DeVorzon and Perry Botkins Jr.
