= William Russo (musician) =

- Born: William Joseph Russo; June 25, 1928; Chicago, Illinois, U.S.
- Died: January 11, 2003 (aged 74) Chicago, Illinois, U.S.
- Genres: Jazz, classical, third stream, ballet, opera
- Occupations: Composer, conductor, arranger, musician
- Instrument: Trombone
- Years active: 1950–2003

William Joseph Russo (June 25, 1928 – January 11, 2003) was an American composer, arranger, and musician from Chicago, Illinois, United States.

== History ==
A student of jazz pianist Lennie Tristano, Russo wrote orchestral scores for the Stan Kenton Orchestra in the 1950s, including 23 Degrees N 82 Degrees W, Frank Speaking, and Portrait of a Count. He composed Halls of Brass for the brass section, without woodwinds or percussion. The section recording this piece included Buddy Childers, Maynard Ferguson and Milt Bernhart. In 1954, Russo left the Kenton Orchestra and continued private composition and conducting studies, then moved to New York City in 1958, where he led the 22-piece Bill Russo Orchestra.

In 1962, Russo moved to England and worked for the British Broadcasting Corporation (BBC). While working in London he founded the London Jazz Orchestra. He was a contributor to the third stream movement which sought to combine jazz and classical music. In 1965 he returned to his native Chicago and founded the music department at Columbia College Chicago. He was the director for the Center for New Music and the college's first full-time faculty member. He was the Director of Orchestral Studies at Scuola Europea d'Orchestra Jazz in Palermo, Italy.

Besides writing for jazz ensembles, Russo composed classical music, including symphonies and choral works, and works for the theater, often mixing elements of the genres. His 1959 Symphony No. 2 in C "TITANS" received a Koussevitsky award, and marked his entrance into the classical-music world. It was performed by the New York Philharmonic that year with Leonard Bernstein conducting (Bernstein had commissioned the piece) and trumpeter Maynard Ferguson appearing as soloist.

The 1973 album that included Russo's Three Pieces for Blues Band and Symphony Orchestra became a big seller for Deutsche Grammophon, with its cross-genre performance by the San Francisco Symphony Orchestra, with Seiji Ozawa conducting and the Siegel-Schwall Band. (Ozawa had premiered "Three Pieces for Blues Band and Symphony Orchestra" with the Chicago Symphony Orchestra and the Siegel-Schwall Band in 1968.) The success prompted the label to release Russo's Street Music, A Blues Concerto in 1979, featuring Corky Siegel on harmonica and piano.

Russo's theater works included a rock cantata, The Civil War (1968), based on poems by Paul Horgan. A politically charged multimedia piece for soloist, chorus, dancers, and rock band, The Civil War paralleled the American Civil War and the martyrdom of President Lincoln with the turbulent civil rights and antiwar movements of the 1960s and the murders of Martin Luther King Jr. and Robert F. Kennedy. Russo followed The Civil War with other rock-based multimedia music-theater works, including Liberation, Joan of Arc, Aesop's Fables, The Bacchae, and Song of Songs. These were performed by the Chicago Free Theater, which Russo founded and directed. The Free Theater spawned companies in Baltimore and San Francisco.

In 1969, Russo and director Paul Sills, founding director of the Second City, and community activist Rev. Jim Shiflett testablished the Body Politic Theatre. Russo's other works for the theater include the operas John Hooton (1962), The Island (1963), Land of Milk and Honey (1964), Antigone (1967), The Shepherds' Christmas, The Pay-Off (1983–84), The Sacrifice, and Dubrovsky (1988), as well as a double bill of operas inspired by commedia dell'arte, Isabella's Fortune and Pedrolino's Revenge (performed off-Broadway in 1974), and a musical fairy tale for children, The Golden Bird, for singers, narrator, dancers, and symphony orchestra (premiered in 1984 under the auspices of the Chicago Symphony Orchestra). His collaborators included Adrian Mitchell, Arnold Weinstein, Jon Swan, Alice Albright Hoge, Irma Routen, Naomi Lazard, Robert Perrey, Donald T. Sanders, Albert Williams, Jonathan Abarbanel, and Denise DeClue. Russo also composed art songs set to poetry by Edna St. Vincent Millay, W. H. Auden, and Gertrude Stein, as well as scores for dance and film.

As part of his work with Columbia College, he started the Chicago Jazz Ensemble (CJE), which was dedicated to preserving and expanding jazz. A few years later this ensemble disbanded but was reborn in 1991. Russo's successor as artistic director was trumpeter Jon Faddis. Russo appeared with the band at the Jazz Showcase nightclub during the week before his death. After struggling with cancer, he retired as chair of the Columbia College Music Department in 2002. He died in 2003.

== Personal life ==
Russo married Shelby Jean Davis, a singer. The couple had one child: Camille Blinstrub. He later married Jeremy Warburg, a music teacher, who was a granddaughter of American magazine publisher Condé Nast. They had two children: Alexander Russo and Condée Nast Russo. His third wife was Carol Loverde, a classical soprano. He also had a daughter, Whitney C. Schildgen, from an extramarital relationship.

== Other activities ==
Russo was a trombonist and composition teacher. His students included Neil Ardley, John Barry, Patrick Gowers, Mark Hollmann, Fred Karlin, Richard Peaslee, Joseph Reiser, Louis Rosen, Kenny Wheeler and Albert Williams.

Russo composed more than 200 pieces for jazz orchestra, and there were more than 30 recordings of his work. His five-decade career included collaborations with his idol Duke Ellington, Leonard Bernstein, Seiji Ozawa, Stan Kenton, Cannonball Adderley, Yehudi Menuhin, Dizzy Gillespie, Benny Carter, Maynard Ferguson, Billie Holiday, Cleo Laine, and Annie Ross.

He wrote four books on music: Composing for the Jazz Orchestra (1973), Jazz Composition and Orchestration (1968), Workbook for Composing for the Jazz Orchestra (1978) with co-author Reid Hyams and Composing Music: A New Approach (1983) written with former students Jeffrey Ainis and David Stevenson.

In 1990, he received a Lifetime Achievement Award from the National Academy of Recording Arts and Sciences.

== Discography ==
=== As leader ===
- A Recital in New American Music (Dee Gee, 1951) (reissued as part of Jazz Composers Workshop (Savoy, 1951-52) with J Giuffre, S Rogers, S Manne, and latera as Deep People)
- The World of Alcina (Atlantic, 1956))
- Something new, something blu (Columbia, 1959)
- A symphony of popular songs (Sesac late '50)
- School of Rebellion (Roulette, 1960)
- The Seven Deadly Sins (Roulette, 1960)
- Russo in London (Columbia, 1962) with London Jazz Orchestra
- Stereophony (FM, 1964)
- Stonehenge (Columbia, 1964) with London Jazz Orchestra
- Virtuosity : A contemporary look (Columbia 1964)
- The carousel suite (GM, 1983)

=== As composer ===
- Three Pieces for Blues Band and Symphony Orchestra, Op. 50 (San Francisco Symphony, Seiji Ozawa, Siegel-Schwall Band) (Deutsche Grammophon, 1973)
- Street Music, Op. 65 (San Francisco Symphony, Seiji Ozawa, Corky Siegel) (Deutsche Grammophon, 1977)
- Three Pieces for Blues Band and Symphony Orchestra, Op. 50 (San Francisco Symphony, Seiji Ozawa, Siegel-Schwall Band), Street Music, Op. 65 (San Francisco Symphony, Seiji Ozawa, Corky Siegel) (Deutsche Grammophon, 2002)

=== As sideman or arranger ===
With Stan Kenton

- Innovations in Modern Music (Capitol, 1950)
- Stan Kenton Presents (Capitol, 1950)
- Popular Favorites by Stan Kenton (Capitol, 1953)
- Sketches on Standards (Capitol, 1953)
- This Modern World (Capitol, 1953)
- Portraits on Standards (Capitol, 1953) - arranger only
- Kenton Showcase (Capitol, 1954) - composer and arranger
- The Kenton Era (Capitol, 1955)
- The Innovations Orchestra (Capitol, 1997)

With Shelly Manne

- The West Coast Sound (Contemporary, 1955) - composer/arranger of 3 tracks

With Lee Konitz

- An Image: Lee Konitz with Strings (Verve, 1958) - conductor and arranger

With Julian "Cannonball" Adderley

- Jump For Joy (EmArcy, 1958) - conductor and arranger

== List of compositions ==
- 23N/82W, Op.8, 1953
- Aesop's Fables, 1972
- Allegro for Concert Band, Op.12, 1957
- An Album of Songs, Op. 94, 1987
- Anthem of Liberty and Justice, 1982
- Antigone, Op.49, 1967
- The Bacchae, 1973
- A Cabaret Opera, Op. 70, 1985
- The Carousel Suite, Op.63
- Canticle
- Chicago Suite No. 2, Op. 97, 1996
- City in a garden, Op. 74, 1998
- The Civil War, Op.52
- Concerto in C for Violoncello and Orchestra, Op.41, 1962
- Concerto Grosso, Op.37, 1960
- Convalescence, 1989
- The Daffodil's Smile, Op.28
- David, Op.54, 1968
- Dubrovsky, Op.83, 1987, 1992
- Dubrovsky Suite No.2, Op.99
- Elegy, Op.81, 1986
- The English Concerto, Op.43
- Ennui, Op.8, 1980
- Frank Speaking, Op.5
- A General Opera, Op.66,1976
- The Golden Bird, Op.77, 1985
- An Image of Man, Op.27, 1985
- In Memoriam, Herman Conaway, Op.95, 1994
- The Island, Op.42
- Joan of Arc, 1970
- John Hooton, Op.36, 1962
- Jubilatum, Op.101, 1999
- Land of Milk and Honey, Op.45, 1964
- Liberation, Op.55, 1969
- Mass, Op.99, 1996
- Margery Kemp, Op.72
- Memphis, Op.84, 1987
- Missa, Op.100, 1997
- Newport Suite, Op.24
- Oedipus Rex, Op.79[?]
- Pedrolino's Revenge, Op.62, 1975
- The Sacrifice, Op.88, 1990
- The Seasons, Op.90, 1991, 1993
- The Seven Valleys, Op.68, 1976
- The Shepherd, Op.100, 2000
- The Shepherds' Christmas, Op.71, 1990
- Songs of Celebration, Op.58, 1971
- Song of Songs, Op.60, 1972
- Spectrum, Op.39
- Street Music, Op.65, 1975
- Suite for Violin, Op.46
- Symphony No.2 in C: Titans, Op.32
- Talking to the Sun, Op.86, 1989
- Three Pieces for Blues Band and Orchestra, 1968, 1973
- Time of Angels, Op.84, 1986
- The Touro Cantata, Op.85, 1989
- Wither Weather, Op.69, 1978
- Women, Op.89, 1990

== List of print works ==
- Composing for the Jazz Orchestra (Chicago: The University of Chicago Press, 1961, ISBN 978-0-226-73209-1)
- Jazz Composition and Orchestration (Chicago: The University of Chicago Press, 1968 ISBN 978-0-226-73208-4)
- Workbook for Composing for the Jazz Orchestra Co-Authored With Reid Hyams (Chicago: The University of Chicago Press, 1978, ISBN 978-0-226-73214-5)
- Composing Music: A New Approach (Chicago: The University of Chicago Press, 1988, ISBN 978-0-226-73216-9)

== See also ==
- List of jazz arrangers

== Sources ==
- John Fordham, "Bill Russo - Creator of a jazz/classical hybrid" (obituary), The Guardian, 13 March 2003.
- William Russo Collection, College Archives & Special Collections, Columbia College Chicago
- Wilfrid Mellers, Music in a New Found Land: Themes and Developments in the History of American Music, 1964, Transaction Publishers, ISBN 9781412845076
