= Robert Graettinger =

American composer

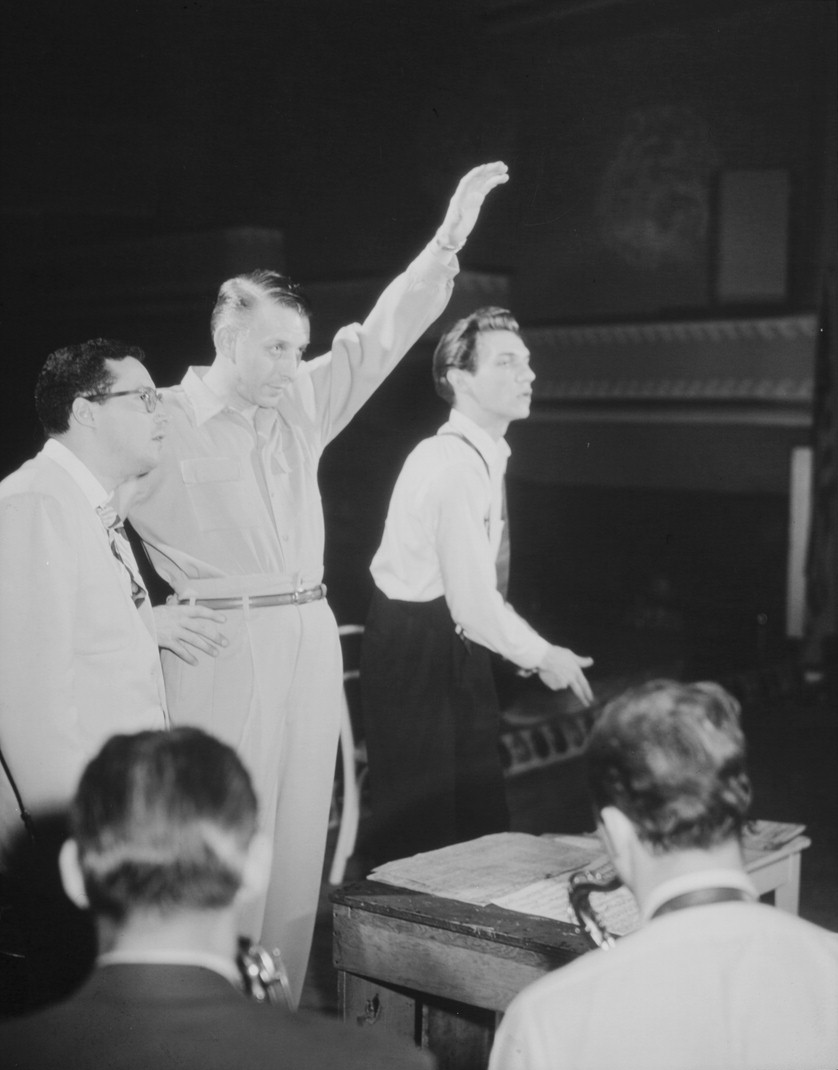
(From left:) Pete Rugolo, Stan Kenton, and Bob Graettinger. Photograph by William P. Gottlieb.

Robert Frederick Graettinger (October 31, 1923 – March 12, 1957) was an American composer, best known for his work with Stan Kenton.

== Biography ==
Graettinger grew up in Ontario, California, United States, learning to play the saxophone in high school. While at school he also began arranging music. In the 1940s he played alto saxophone with Benny Carter among others. Around this time he focused more on composing.

In 1947 he offered a short composition, "Thermopylae", to Stan Kenton, who decided to record it. Graettinger then came up with "City of Glass", a four-part tone poem. At this time he was studying composition under Russell Garcia.

Graettinger's radical polystylistic soundworld, with its polyphonic density and bracing atonality, while drawing on ideas previously explored by the likes of Charles Ives, Igor Stravinsky, Aaron Copland and even Arnold Schoenberg, still remains truly distinctive. He died aged only 33, of lung cancer.

== Discography ==
=== Capitol recordings with Stan Kenton ===
- Thermopylae (78) 1947
- Everything Happens To Me (78) 1947
- A Presentation of Progressive Jazz (includes "Thermopylae")
- Innovations in Modern Music (includes "Incident in Jazz") 1950
- Stan Kenton Presents (includes "House of Strings") 1950
- City of Glass (10") 1951
- The Kenton Era (includes "Modern Opus" and "You Go to My Head") 1952
- This Modern World 1953

=== The Ebony Big Band ===
- City of Glass: Robert Graettinger 1994
- The Ebony Big Band: Live at the Paradiso — Robert Graettinger 1998

=== Terry Vosbein and the Knoxville Jazz Orchestra ===
- Progressive Jazz 2009 [Max Frank Music] 2009

== Arrangements and compositions created for Kenton ==
+ indicates original composition

- Afternoon + (1948)
- April in Paris (1948)
- April in Paris (1949) [woodwinds, brass, strings]
- Autumn in New York (1947)
- Beachcomber, The + (1948)
- Cello, A + (1952)
- Cello Solo + (1951)
- City of Glass + (1947)
- City of Glass + (1951)
- Condolence + (1948)
- Cuban Pastorale + (1948)
- Everything Happens to Me (1948) [June Christy/vocal] [with strings]
- Everything Happens to Me (1948) [June Christy/vocal] [without strings]
- Fine and Dandy (1948) [June Christy/vocal]
- Graettinger No.1 + (1949) [aka Incident in Jazz]
- Graettinger No.2 + (1950)
- Graettinger No.3 + (1950)
- Horn, A + (1951)
- House of Strings + (1950)
- I Only Have Eyes for You (1948)
- I'm in the Mood for Love (1947)
- Irresistible You (1948)
- Laura (1948)
- Lover Man (1948) [June Christy/vocal]
- Modern Opus + (1952)
- Molshoaro + (1947)
- Orchestra, An + (1953)
- Piece for Flute and String Quartet +
- Some Saxophones + (1953)
- Suite for Small Orchestra + (1950) [aka Above The Timberline]
- Suite for String Trio and Wind Quartet + (1953–57)
- Theme (1946) +
- Thermopylae + (1947)
- Thought, A + (1947)
- Thought, A + (1953)
- Too Marvelous for Words (1948)
- Transparency + (1952)
- Trumpet, A + (1952) [Maynard Ferguson feature]
- Untitled [In Three Tempi] + (1948)
- Untitled Piece for Innovations Orchestra + (1950)
- Untitled Piece for Jazz Band +
- Untitled Piece for Jazz Band + (1948)
- Untitled Piece for Jazz Band + (1952)
- Untitled Piece for Jazz Band + (1952) Conte Candoli feature
- Untitled Piece for Jazz Band + (1952) Frank Rosolino feature
- Untitled Piece for Jazz Band + [Two In One, parts 1 & 2] (1952)
- Untitled Piece for Jazz Band + (1948) [Unfinished]
- Untitled Piece for Strings + (1950)
- Walkin' by the River
- Yenta +
- You Go To My Head (1953)
