= Buddy Childers =

American jazz trumpeter and composer

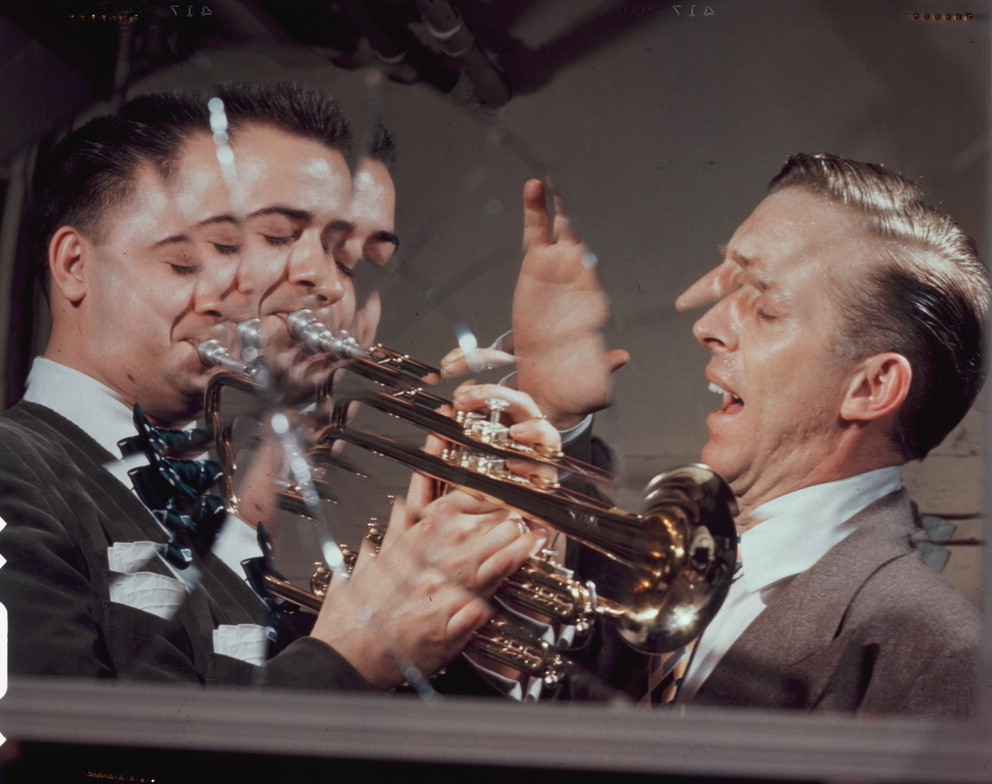
- Childers (left) and Stan Kenton, ca. 1947.

Background information
- Born: Marion Childers; February 12, 1926; Belleville, Illinois, United States
- Died: May 24, 2007 (aged 81) Woodland Hills, California, United States
- Genres: Jazz
- Occupations: Musician, composer
- Instrument: Trumpet
- Label: Candid Records
- Formerly of: Stan Kenton; Tommy Dorsey; Woody Herman

Marion "Buddy" Childers (February 12, 1926 – May 24, 2007) was an American jazz trumpeter, composer and ensemble leader. Childers became famous in 1942 at the age of 16, when Stan Kenton hired him to be the lead trumpet in his band.

== Biography ==
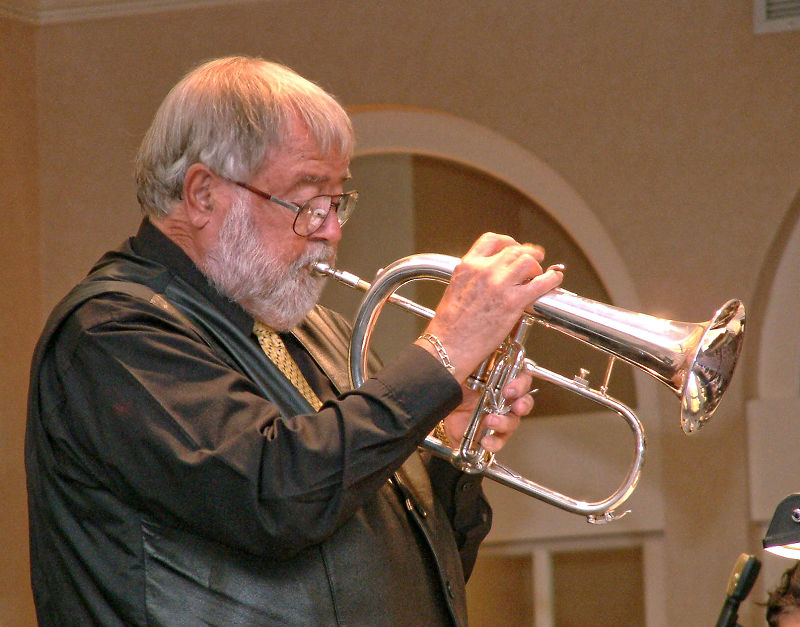
Buddy Childers, here playing fluegelhorn, at Newport Beach CA in 2003

As Childers later told Steve Voce:

At the rehearsal he sat me down in the first trumpet chair, had the first trumpet player sit out. I played about eight or nine things in a row and the adrenalin was really flying that day. I was 16 I probably looked about 13, but I played considerably more maturely than that. 'Well, what do you want to do?' he said after that was over. 'I want to join your band.' 'But you're so young.' 'I gotta join your band,' I said. I had this thing in my mind that I had to join a name band at 16 or I'd never be able to make it as a musician. I was thinking of Harry James so young with Ben Pollack and then with Benny Goodman, and Corky Corcoran who joined Sonny Dunham when he was 16 and then became Harry James's leading soloist the next year. So I made it by three weeks. I only had a couple of months before I graduated but I wasn't interested in that, I was only interested in playing.

Childers worked with Kenton for years, and also performed with the big bands of Tommy Dorsey, Woody Herman, Les Brown, Charlie Barnet, Dan Terry, and others. He worked on television programs (including first Trumpet on the CHiPs Season Two Main Title theme in 1978) and in films, and put together a big band that recorded for Candid Records in the 1980s and 1990s. AllMusic.com also credits Childers as recording with The Monkees, The Flying Burrito Brothers, Captain & Tennille, The Carpenters, Tommy Sands, The Friends of Distinction, Barry Manilow, Tim Weisberg, Michael Nesmith, Laura Nyro, Teresa Brewer, The Four Freshmen, The Singers Unlimited, Billy Daniels, Anita O'Day, Ella Fitzgerald, Carmen McRae, Nat King Cole, Dean Martin, Frank Sinatra, Sarah Vaughan. June Christy, Martha Tilton, Frances Faye, Chris Connor, Billy Eckstine, Judith Durham, Randy Crawford, Lena Horne, Patti Page, Peggy Lee, Tierney Sutton, Mel Tormé, Ray Charles & Cleo Laine, Louis Armstrong, Charlie Parker, André Previn, Harvey Mandel, Jack Nimitz, Carl Fontana, Stanley Clarke, Maynard Ferguson, Shorty Rogers, Leith Stevens, Art Pepper, Buddy Rich, Charles Mingus, Gerry Mulligan, Pete Rugolo, Marty Paich, Johnny Richards, Don Fagerquist, David Axelrod, Bob Thiele, Russell Garcia, Stan Getz, Quincy Jones, Mike Barone, Jimmy Smith, Oscar Peterson, Bob Curnow, Tommy Vig, Bob Florence, Toshiko Akiyoshi, Oliver Nelson. Blue Mitchell, Michel Colombier, Lalo Schifrin, Ray Brown, Clare Fischer, Bobby Bryant, Henry Mancini, Bud Shank, and others.

Childers became a member of the Baháʼí Faith by 1982. He died of cancer on May 24, 2007, age 81.

== Discography ==
With the Toshiko Akiyoshi – Lew Tabackin Big Band

- Farewell (Victor / Ascent, 1980)
- From Toshiko with Love (Victor / J.A.M., 1981) – also released as Tanuki's Night Out
- European Memoirs (Victor / Ascent, 1982)

With Gene Ammons

- Free Again (Prestige, 1971)

With Elmer Bernstein

- The Man with the Golden Arm (Decca, 1956)

With Maynard Ferguson

- Around the Horn with Maynard Ferguson (EmArcy, 1956)

With Clare Fischer

- Thesaurus (Atlantic, 1969)

With Milt Jackson

- Memphis Jackson (Impulse!, 1969)

With Quincy Jones

- Roots (A&M, 1977)

With Alan Silvestri

- CHiPs (FSM Silver Line, July 2006)

With Stan Kenton

- Stan Kenton's Milestones (Capitol, 1943-47 [1950])
- Stan Kenton Classics (Capitol, 1944-47 [1952])
- Artistry in Rhythm (Capitol, 1946)
- Encores (Capitol, 1947)
- A Presentation of Progressive Jazz (Capitol, 1947)
- Innovations in Modern Music (Capitol, 1950)
- Stan Kenton Presents (Capitol, 1950)
- New Concepts of Artistry in Rhythm (Capitol, 1952)
- Popular Favorites by Stan Kenton (Capitol, 1953)
- Sketches on Standards (Capitol, 1953)
- This Modern World (Capitol, 1953)
- Portraits on Standards (Capitol, 1953)
- Kenton Showcase (Capitol, 1954)
- The Kenton Era (Capitol, 1940–54, [1955])
- The Innovations Orchestra (Capitol, 1950-51 [1997])

With Carmen McRae

- Can't Hide Love (Blue Note, 1976)

With Oliver Nelson

- Skull Session (Flying Dutchman, 1975)

With Shorty Rogers

- Afro-Cuban Influence (RCA Victor, 1958)
- The Wizard of Oz and Other Harold Arlen Songs (RCA Victor, 1959)
- Shorty Rogers Meets Tarzan (MGM, 1960)

With Pete Rugolo

- Introducing Pete Rugolo (Columbia, 1954)
- Rugolomania (Columbia, 1955)
- New Sounds by Pete Rugolo (Harmony, 1954–55, [1957])
- Music for Hi-Fi Bugs (EmArcy, 1956)
- Percussion at Work (EmArcy, 1957)
- Rugolo Plays Kenton (EmArcy, 1958)
- The Music from Richard Diamond (EmArcy, 1959)

With Lalo Schifrin

- Rock Requiem (Verve, 1971)
