= Innovations in Modern Music =

Studio album by Stan Kenton and His Orchestra
- Released: 1950
- Recorded: February 3 & 4, 1950
- Studio: Capitol Recording Studios, Melrose Avenue, Hollywood, CA
- Genre: Jazz
- Label: Capitol P 189
- Producer: Jim Conkling

Stan Kenton chronology
A Presentation of Progressive Jazz (1947)	Innovations in Modern Music (1950)	Stan Kenton Presents (1950)

Innovations in Modern Music is an album by pianist and bandleader Stan Kenton with his "Innovations" Orchestra featuring performances recorded in 1950 and originally released on the Capitol label.

== Reception ==
Professional ratings
Review scores
Source	Rating
AllMusic	4.5/5 stars

The AllMusic review by Scott Yanow observed "The music is often quite fascinating and very advanced".

== Track listing ==
1. "Trajectories" (Franklyn Marks) – 3:34
2. "Theme for Sunday" (Stan Kenton) – 5:04
3. "Conflict" (Pete Rugolo) – 4:27
4. "Incident in Jazz" (Robert Graettinger) – 3:31
5. "The Lonesome Road" (Nathaniel Shilkret, Gene Austin) – 4:30
6. "Mirage" (Rugolo) – 4:59
7. "Solitaire" (Bill Russo) – 4:17
8. "Cuban Episode" (Chico O'Farrill) – 4:46
- Recorded at Capitol Recording Studios in Hollywood, CA on February 3, 1950 (tracks 2, 3, 6 & 7) and February 4, 1950 (tracks 1, 4, 5 & 8)

== Personnel ==
- Stan Kenton – piano, arranger
- Alfred "Chico" Alvarez, Buddy Childers, Maynard Ferguson, Don Paladino, Shorty Rogers – trumpet
- Milt Bernhart, Harry Betts, Bob Fitzpatrick, Bill Russo – trombone
- Bart Varsalona – bass trombone
- John Graas, Lloyd Otto – French horn
- Gene Englund – tuba
- Art Pepper – alto saxophone, clarinet
- Bud Shank – alto saxophone, flute
- Bob Cooper – tenor saxophone, oboe, English horn
- Bart Caldarell – tenor saxophone, bassoon
- Bob Gioga – baritone saxophone, bass clarinet
- Jim Cathcart, Earl Cornwell, Anthony Doria, Lew Elias, Jim Holmes, George Kast, Alex Law, Herbert Offner, Carl Ottobrino, Dave Schackne – violin
- Stan Harris, Leonard Sclic, Sam Singer – viola
- Gregory Bemko, Zachary Bock, Jack Wulfe – cello
- Laurindo Almeida – guitar
- Don Bagley – bass
- Shelly Manne – drums, tympani
- Carlos Vidal – congas
- June Christy – vocals (tracks 3 & 5)
