= The Kenton Era =

Compilation album by Stan Kenton
- Released: 1955
- Recorded: November 1, 1940 – December 7, 1954; Various Locations
- Genre: Jazz
- Length: 154:29
- Label: Capitol EOX/WDX 569

Stan Kenton chronology
Kenton Showcase (1954)	The Kenton Era (1955)	Duet (1955)

The Kenton Era is a compilation album by pianist and bandleader Stan Kenton featuring recordings from 1940 to 1954 which was originally released in two limited edition box sets, as fifteen 7 inch 45 rpm discs and four 12 inch LPs, on Capitol in 1955.

== Critical reception ==
Professional ratings
Review scores
Source	Rating
Allmusic	4.5/5 stars

The Allmusic review by Scott Yanow states "Kenton is heard reminiscing about his first 15 years in the business, there are some selections taken from his famous 1941 stint at the Rendezvous Ballroom in Balboa, CA, numbers from rehearsals in 1944, radio airchecks dating from 1944-48, some startling performances by Kenton's Innovations orchestra of 1950-51 and a few swinging numbers from his 1952-53 big band. Virtually all of the music is rare, making this an essential acquisition for collectors".

== Track listing ==
Part 1: Prologue

1. Stan Kenton Speaks of the Development of His Music - 11:48

Part 2: Balboa Bandwagon

1. "Artistry in Rhythm (Opening Theme)" (Stan Kenton) - 0:42
2. "Two Moods" (Ralph Yaw) - 2:08
3. "Etude for Saxophones" (Kenton) - 3:15
4. "I Got It Bad (and That Ain't Good)" (Duke Ellington, Paul Francis Webster) - 2:59
5. "Lamento Gitano" (Traditional) - 2:54
6. "Reed Rapture" - 2:14
7. "La Cumparsita" (Gerardo Matos Rodríguez) - 3:16
8. "St. James Infirmary" (Joe Primrose) - 3:16
9. "Arkansas Traveler" (Traditional) - 2:03
10. "Artistry in Rhythm (Closing Theme)" (Kenton) - 0:56

Part 3: Growing Pains

1. "Russian Lullaby" (Irving Berlin) - 2:19
2. "I Lost My Sugar in Salt Lake City" (Johnny Lang, Leon René) - 2:05
3. "Opus a Dollar Three Eighty" (Pete Rugolo) - 2:21
4. "I Know That You Know" (Vincent Youmans, Anne Caldwell) - 1:51
5. "I'm Going Mad for a Pad" (Joe Greene, Stan Kenton, Jack Lawrence) - 3:04
6. "Ol' Man River" (Jerome Kern, Oscar Hammerstein II) - 3:01
7. "I'll Remember April" (Gene de Paul, Patricia Johnston, Don Raye) - 3:03
8. "Liza" (George Gershwin, Ira Gershwin, Gus Kahn) - 2:09

Part 4: Artistry in Rhythm

1. "One Twenty" (Yaw) - 2:41
2. "Body and Soul" (Johnny Green, Frank Eyton, Edward Heyman, Robert Sour) - 3:14
3. "Tea for Two" (Vincent Youmans, Irving Caesar) - 2:49
4. "I Never Thought I'd Sing the Blues" (Floyd Bean, Eddie Stone) - 2:57
5. "I've Got the World on a String" (Harold Arlen, Ted Koehler) - 3:37
6. "Everybody Swing" (Gene Roland) - 2:13
7. "You May Not Love Me" (Jimmy Van Heusen, Johnny Burke) - 2:54
8. "More Than You Know" (Vincent Youmans, Edward Eliscu, Billy Rose) - 2:23

Part 5: Progressive Jazz

1. "Artistry in Harlem Swing" (Roland) - 2:45
2. "If I Could Be with You" (James P. Johnson, Henry Creamer) - 3:41
3. "By the River St. Marie" (Edgar Leslie, Harry Warren) - 1:36
4. "Sophisticated Lady" (Ellington, Mitchell Parish) - 3:11
5. "Interlude" (Rugolo) - 3:54
6. "Over the Rainbow" (Arlen, Yip Harburg) - 3:19
7. "Machito" (Rugolo) - 2:15
8. "Elegy for Alto" (Kenton, Rugolo) - 4:02

Part 6: Innovations

1. "In Veradero" (Neal Hefti) - 4:15
2. "Amazonia" (Laurindo Almeida) - 4:37
3. "Salute" (Rugolo) - 4:02
4. "Coop's Solo" (Shorty Rogers) - 3:39
5. "Ennui" (Bill Russo) - 3:37
6. "Samana" (Manny Albam) - 3:49

Part 7: Contemporary

1. "Swing House" (Gerry Mulligan) - 2:53
2. "You Go to My Head" (J. Fred Coots, Haven Gillespie) - 3:18
3. "Baa-Too-Kee" (Almeida) - 2:40
4. "Stella by Starlight" (Victor Young, Ned Washington) - 3:16
5. "Bill's Blues" (Russo) - 2:51
6. "Modern Opus" (Robert Graettinger) - 3:13
7. "Zoot" (Bill Holman) - 3:16

Part 8: Epilogue

1. Epilogue: Stan Kenton Speaks a Word in Summation and Looks to the Future - 2:10
2. "Artistry in Rhythm (Theme)" (Kenton) - 3:58

== Recording locations ==
- Recorded at Music City, Hollywood, CA on November 1, 1940 (track 2–3), at the Rendezvous Ballroom in Balboa, CA on July 25, 1941 (tracks 2–2 & 2–6), August 17, 1941 (tracks 2–4, 2–7 & 2–9) and September 1, 1941 (tracks 2–1, 2–5, 2–8 & 2–10), at the Civic Auditorium in Pasadena, CA on January 14, 1944 (3–2, 3–6 & 3–8), at Band Rehearsal in Hollywood, CA on April 20, 1944 (3–4 & 3–7), at MacGregor Studio, Hollywood, CA on May 20, 1944 (3–5), at Band Rehearsal in Hollywood, CA on December 6, 1944 (3–1 & 3–3), at Radio Recorders, Hollywood, CA on November 27, 1945 (4–2), December 20, 1945 (4–1, 4–3 & 4–4) and July 18, 1946 (4–5 & 4–8), July 19, 1946 (4–6 & 4–7) and April 1, 1947 (5–1 to 5–4) at the Commodore Hotel, NYC, NY on December 13, 1947 (5–6), at the Hollywood Bowl, CA on June 12, 1948 (5–5, 5–7 & 5–8), at the Capitol Studios, Melrose Avenue, Hollywood CA on February 3, 1950 (6–2) and February 5, 1950 (6–1), March 19, 1952 (7–5) and March 20, 1952 (7–4), January 28, 1953 (7–4), January 30, 1953 (7–3) and December 7, 1954 (1–1 & 8–1), at the Cornell Rhythm Club Concert, Ithaca, NY on October 14, 1951 (6–3 to 6–6), at Universal Recorders in Chicago, IL on September 15, 1952 (7–1 & 7–2) and July 9, 1953 (8–2) and at The Alhambra in Paris, France, on September 18, 1953 (7–7).

== Personnel ==
- Bob Ahern - guitar
- Manny Albam -
- Laurindo Almeida - guitar, rhythm, soloist
- Chico Álvarez - soloist, trumpet
- Nestor Amaral - bongos, rhythm
- John Anderson - trumpet
- Al Anthony - alto saxophone, saxophone, soloist
- Harold Arlen -
- Bill Atkinson - trombone
- Don Bagley - bass
- Chet Ball - saxophone
- Frank Beach - trumpet
- Floyd Bean -
- Morey Beeson - saxophone
- Gregory Bemko - cello
- Irving Berlin -
- Milt Bernhart - soloist, trombone
- Eddie Bert - trombone
- Harry Betts - soloist, trombone
- Ralph Blaze - guitar, tuba
- Zachary Bock - cello
- Ray Borden - trumpet
- Russ Burgher - trumpet
- Irving Caesar -
- Bart Caldarell - saxophone
- Anne Caldwell -
- Conte Candoli - soloist, trumpet
- John Carroll - soloist, trumpet
- Buddy Childers - trumpet
- June Christy - vocals
- Dick Cole - trombone
- Ralph Collier - drums
- Bob Cooper - tenor saxophone, saxophone, soloist
- John David Coppola - trumpet
- Earl Cornwell - violin
- Jack Costanzo - bongos, soloist
- Al Costi - guitar
- Phil Davidson - violin
- Don Dennis - trumpet
- Anthony S. Doria - violin
- Red Dorris - tenor saxophone, saxophone, soloist
- Gene Englund - bass, tuba
- Jim Falzone - drums
- George Faye - trombone
- Maynard Ferguson - trumpet
- Tony Ferina - saxophone
- Alluísio Antunes "Lulu" Ferreira - rhythm
- Bob Fitzpatrick - trombone
- Stan Fletcher - tuba
- Harry Forbes - trombone
- Barry Galbraith - guitar
- Karl George - trumpet
- Bob Gioga - saxophone
- John Graas - French horn, horn
- Robert F. Graettinger - arranger,
- Bart Gray - violin
- Mel Green - trumpet
- Frank Greene - coordination
- María Mendez Grever -
- Johnny Halliburton - trombone
- Oscar Hammerstein II -
- Ken Hanna - arranger, trumpet
- E.Y. "Yip" Harburg -
- Alex Harding - saxophone
- Stanley Harris - viola
- Buddy Hayes - bass
- Bill Holman - saxophone
- James Damian Holmes - violin
- Gene Howard - vocals
- John Howell - trumpet
- Paul Israel - viola
- Gabe Jellen - cello
- Milt Kabak - arranger, trombone
- George Kast - soloist, violin
- Dick Kenney - trombone
- Stan Kenton - bandleader, piano, Primary Artist
- Bob "Dingbod" Kesterson - bass
- Ray Klein - trombone
- Irv Kluger - drums
- Maurice Koukel - violin
- Alex Law - violin
- Skip Layton - soloist, trombone
- Bob Lively - saxophone
- Ivan Lopes - bongos
- Abe Luboff - bass
- Bob Lymperis - trumpet
- Shelly Manne - drums
- Ruban McFall - trumpet
- Dick Meldonian - saxophone
- Seb Mercurio - violin
- Eddie Meyers - alto saxophone, saxophone, soloist
- Dolly Mitchell - vocals
- Dick Morse - trumpet
- Dwight Muma - violin
- Vido Musso - tenor saxophone, saxophone, soloist
- Boots Mussulli - alto saxophone, saxophone, soloist
- Danny Napolitano - violin
- Lennie Niehaus - alto saxophone, saxophone, soloist
- Anita O'Day - soloist, vocals
- Herbert Offner - violin
- José Oliveira - bongos
- Jack Ordean - alto saxophone, saxophone, soloist
- Lloyd Otto - French horn, horn
- Carl Ottobrino - violin
- Don Paladino - trumpet
- Art Pepper - alto saxophone, saxophone, soloist
- Al Porcino - trumpet
- George Price - horn
- Clyde Reisinger - trumpet
- Joe Rizzo - arranger
- George Roberts - soloist, trombone
- Shorty Rogers - trumpet
- Gene Roland - arranger, trumpet
- Ted Romersa - saxophone
- Pete Rugolo - arranger
- Howard Rumsey - bass
- Bill Russo - soloist, trombone
- Eddie Safranski - bass, soloist
- Charlie Scarle - violin
- Dave Schildkraut - saxophone
- Bud Shank - flute, saxophone, soloist
- Aaron Shapiro - viola
- Charlie Shirley - arranger
- Jimmy Simms - trombone
- Zoot Sims & His Five Brothers - tenor saxophone, saxophone, soloist
- Miff Sines - trombone
- Sam Singer - viola
- Clyde Singleton - bass
- Bill Smiley - trombone
- Dave Smiley - viola
- Don Smith - trumpet
- Bart Varsalona - trombone
- Joe Vernon - drums
- Carlos Vidal - Congas
- George Weidler - alto saxophone, saxophone, soloist
- Warner Weidler - saxophone
- Ray Wetzel - soloist, trumpet
- Stu Williamson - trumpet
- Kai Winding - soloist, trombone
- Ben Zimberoff - violin
- Freddie Zito - trombone
