= Robert E. Myers (music producer) =

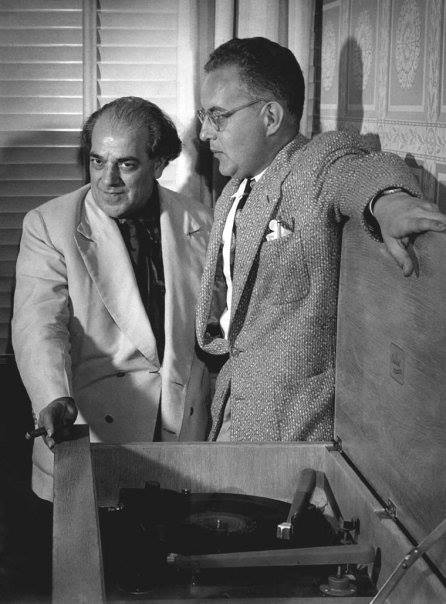
Record producer Robert E. Myers with Brazilian composer Hector Villa Lobos.

Robert Earl Myers Jr. (March 22, 1912 – March 12, 1976), also known as Bob Myers, was an American classical music record producer and artists & repertoire specialist. Myers spent most of his career at Capitol Records and the classical music division of its EMI parent company, Angel Records. During his early years with Capitol Records, Myers produced Grammy Award winning classical albums. In his later career, Myers led the Angel label in the United States, which included responsibility for all business and artist and repertoire decisions.

== Early career (record producer) ==
Robert Earl Myers Jr. was born in Mexico City. He began his career at RCA Victor. In 1945 he moved to Columbia Records where he worked in marketing and promotion, as well as producing records under the direction of artists and repertoire chief Bill Richards. Myers produced records by the Budapest String Quartet, Helen Traubel, Rise Stevens and Nelson Eddy.

Myers joined Capitol as classical sales promotions manager in 1949, the year that marked the company's first foray into the field of classical music. In 1952, Myers assumed responsibilities as a classical producer. During his tenure, Myers produced albums by Hollywood String Quartet, Felix Slatkin, Laurindo Almeida, Carmen Dragon, Roger Wagner Chorale, Marcel Grandjany, Hollywood Bowl Symphony Orchestra, Leonard Pennario and Salli Terri, among others.

At the first Grammy Awards ceremony in 1959, five separate recordings produced by Myers were nominated in the classical categories. Three recordings were awarded the first Grammys in their respective categories. Duets with Spanish Guitar with Laurindo Almeida, Salli Terri and Martin Ruderman won Best Engineered Classical Recording. The 1959 Grammy for Best Classical Performance, Chamber Music was awarded to the Hollywood String Quartet for the Myers produced Beethoven String Quartet No 13 in B flat Op. 130. Also that year, the Roger Wagner Chorale recording Virtuoso won the Grammy for Best Classical Performance, Operatic or Choral. Virtuoso was co-produced by Myers and Ralph O'Connor.

Myers produced several other notable recordings during his early career. These include: The Spanish Guitars of Laurindo Almeida, the 1960 Grammy winner Best Classical performance Instrumental Soloist or Duo; Conversations with the Guitar with Laurindo Almeida, Salli Terri and others, which won the 1960 Grammy Award for Best Classical Performance Vocal or Instrumental-Chamber Music; the Grammy-nominated Music for the Harp by Marcel Grandjany; the Roger Wagner Chorale's 1955 Folk Songs of the New World featuring a solo by the young Marilyn Horne on "He's Gone Away"; the Roger Wagner Chorale's 1956 Gold Record Joy to the World; and the Hollywood String Quartet 1953 recording of the Creston String Quartet, Op.8 which earned the acclaim of the composer. Paul Creston wrote to Myers: "I am tremendously pleased with the performance and reproduction of the work. Would you...convey my deepest appreciation and gratitude to the Hollywood String Quartet for their splendid execution."

A partial Robert Myers discography is located at the end of this article. As noted, several Myers recordings have been re-released in multiple formats, and continue to earn commendations, including the 2010 induction of Duets with the Spanish Guitar in the Fanfare Magazine Classical Recording Hall of Fame. More recently, in her memoir Simple Dreams, singer Linda Ronstadt cited the Almeida-Terri-Ruderman Duets with the Spanish Guitar as "...one of my most cherished recordings."

== Later career (classical repertoire and business leader) ==
In 1955, British based EMI acquired a 96% ownership interest in Capitol Records. EMI classical recordings previously released in the United States by RCA Victor were ultimately contractually transferred to the Angel label, distributed by Capitol. While still a producer, in 1958 Myers assumed the additional responsibility as Classical Coordinator, assuming administrative responsibility for all Capitol and EMI classical releases (called Cap-EMI and Angel respectively).

Two classical labels in one company resulted in confusion in the marketplace. Capitol ultimately eliminated Cap-EMI, naming Robert Myers as Artist and Repertoire Director of Angel Records. Until 1974, Myers was responsible for the release schedules, marketing strategies and manufacturing sound quality for all Angel recordings in the United States. While collaborating with its EMI parent and other subsidiaries within the greater EMI organization, Angel Records in the United States exercised considerable autonomy in deciding how to meet the demands of the American classical market.

In his capacity as director of Angel classical repertoire, Myers represented the business and artistic interests of Capitol Records as a member of the EMI International Classical Repertoire Committee ("ICRC"). The ICRC had representatives from EMI's classical subsidiaries around the world; the committee established international recording schedules, budgets and artist commitments. Many internationally renowned classical music artists recorded for EMI/Angel Records, including singers Maria Callas, Victoria de los Ángeles, Elisabeth Schwarzkopf, Giuseppe Di Stefano, Franco Corelli, Mirella Freni, Birgit Nilsson, Tito Gobbi; conductors Otto Klemperer, Herbert von Karajan, Carlo Maria Giulini, Georges Prête, Sir Thomas Beecham; soloists Yehudi Menuhin, Jacqueline du Pré, Daniel Barenboim and Dennis Brain. In the US, Angel Records also maintained an active recording program of American musicians, including Christopher Parkening, Angel Romero, Ransom Wilson, and Leonard Pennario.

Among the achievements during Myers' tenure was the 1966 creation of the Melodiya Angel label, led by Capitol's President Alan W. Livingston. Under Capitol's contractual agreement, Capitol Records had exclusive manufacturing and distribution rights for recordings made in the Soviet Union during the height of the Cold War. The agreement made previously unreleased recordings by Soviet-controlled artists including David Oistrakh, Sviatoslav Richter, Emil Gilels and Mstislav Rostropovich available in the United States. Robert Myers decided which records would be released under the agreement, and was responsible for liaison with Soviet officials, artists and recording experts.

While heading Melodiya Angel, Myers was credited with the introduction of music that had not previously been known in the United States, including Shostakovitch's The Execution of Stepan Razin and Prokoviev's film score for Ivan the Terrible. In addition, Myers secured the landmark 1973 release of the first recording ever made of Rachmaninoff's Vespers, Op. 37, also known as the All Night Vigil, Op.37 by Alexander Sveshnikov with the State Russian Choir (at the time known as the USSR Academic Russian Choir). In the March, 1974 issue of Stereo Review, reviewer Abram Chipman observed that previously only excerpts of the work had been available on record. Chipman wrote: "The Melodiya recording was the serendipitous discovery of Angel's general manager Robert Myers while on a trip to the Soviet Union. Once he tracked down the recording, he had to prevail rather heavily on the Soviet powers that be to make it part of their trade agreement with Angel."

During his Angel tenure, Myers was also responsible for the selection of music for The Story of Great Music and Concerts of Great Music, a twenty-two volume set issued by Time-Life Records in collaboration with Angel from 1966-1968. The series covers the history of classical music from The Early Renaissance through The Music of Today. Sample titles include: The Baroque Era, The Age of Elegance, The Age of Revolution, and The Spanish Style. Each box set includes four to five long playing LPs with an accompanying book on the art and history of the respective era, as well as a "Listening Guide" for each recording. Upon Myers' death in 1976, The Story of Great Music was noted as "the best selling series of classical records in history".

From approximately 1966 to 1971, Bob Myers represented the classical music field as an elected member of the Los Angeles Board of Governors for the National Academy of Recording Arts and Sciences (NARAS), which hosts the Grammy Awards among other recording industry endeavors.

== Death ==
Robert E. Myers died in Los Angeles on March 12, 1976 at the age of 63.

== Discography (partial) ==
- Hollywood String Quartet:
  - Shostakovich Piano Quintet in G minor, Op. 57 with Victor Aller (1952) Capitol P-8171, CTL 7024, Testament SBT 1077
  - Tchaikovsky String Quartet No. 1 in D, Op. 11 and Borodin String Quartet No. 2 in D (1953) Capitol P 8187, CTL 7031, Testament SBT 1061
  - Franck Piano Quintet in F minor with Victor Aller (1953) Capitol P-8220, CTL 7045, Testament SBT 1077
  - Turina La oración del torero, Op. 34 and Creston String Quartet, Op. 8 with Victor Aller (1953) Capitol P- 8260, CTL 7063, Testament SBT 1053
  - Brahms Piano Quintet in F minor, Op. 34 (1954) Capitol P-8269, CTL 7075, Testament SBT 3063
  - Dvořák String Quartet No. 6 in F, Op. 96 ("American") and Dohnányi String Quartet No. 3 in A minor, Op. 33 (1955) Capitol P-8307, CTL 7098, Testament SBT 1081
  - Schumann Piano Quintet in E flat, Op.44 with Victor Aller and Hummel String Quartet Op 30 No. 2 (1955) Capitol P 8316
  - Smetana String Quartet and Glazunov Novelettes (1955) Capitol P-8331
  - Brahms Piano Quartet No. 2 in A, Op. 26 (1956) Capitol P-8376, PBR 8346 Testament SBT 3063 (3-CD set)
  - Brahms Piano Quartet No. 3 in C minor, Op. 60 with Victor Aller (1956) Capitol P-8377, PBR 8346 Testament SBT 3063
  - Brahms Piano Quartet No. 1 in G minor, Op. 25 with Victor Aller (1956) Capitol P-8378, PBR 8346 Testament SBT 3063
  - Schubert String Quartet No. 14 in D minor, D 810 ("Death and the Maiden") (1957) Capitol P-8359 Testament 1061
  - Beethoven String Quartet No. 15 in A minor, Op. 132 (1957) Capitol P-8424/PER 8394 Testament SBT 3082
  - Beethoven String Quartet in C sharp minor, Op. 131 (1957) Capitol P-8425/PER 8394 Testament SBT 3082
  - Beethoven String Quartet No. 13 in B flat, Op. 130 (1957) Capitol P-8429/PER 8394 Testament SBT 3082, Grammy Award Winner, 1959
  - Beethoven Grosse Fuge in B flat, Op. 133 (1957) Capitol P-8455/PER 8394 Testament SBT 3063
  - Villa-Lobos String Quartet No. 6 and Kodály String Quartet No. 2, Op. 10 Capitol (1958) P(SP) 8472
- Laurindo Almeida:
  - Guitar Music of Spain (1954) Capitol P-8295
  - Guitar Music of Latin America (1955) Capitol P-8321
  - From the Romantic Era (1956) Capitol P-8341
  - Vistas di Espana (1956) Capitol P-8367
  - Impressoes do Brasil (1957) Capitol P-8381
  - New World of the Guitar (1957) Capitol P-8392
  - Duets with Spanish Guitar (1958) Capitol P-8406, Angel S-36050, EMI CD GMR 2167 with Salli Terri and Martin Ruderman, Grammy Award Winner
  - For My True Love (1959) Capitol P(SP)-8461 with Salli Terri Selected tracks Reissued Angel S-36051 as Duets with the Spanish Guitar Vol. 2
  - Music for a Spanish Guitar (1959) Capitol P(SP)-8497
  - The Spanish Guitars of Laurindo Almeida (1960) Capitol P(SP)-8521 Grammy Award Winner
  - Conversations with the Guitar (1960) Capitol P(SP)-8532 with Salli Terri, Martin Ruderman, Mitchell Lurie, Sanford Schonbach, Grammy Award Winner Selected tracks Reissued Angel S-36051 as Duets with the Spanish Guitar Vol. 2
  - Guitar World of Laurindo Almeida (1961) Capitol P(SP)- 8546
- Roger Wagner Chorale:
  - Faure Requiem, Op. 48 (1953) with Patricia Beems, Theodor Uppman, Concert Arts Orchestra, Capitol P 8241, CTL 7050 CD: CDM 5 67251 2
  - Songs of Stephen Foster (1954) Capitol P 8267, CTL 7073, Angel S-36071
  - Folk Songs of the New World (1955) with Harve Presnell, Marilyn Horne, Salli Terri, Capitol P-8324/PBR 8345
  - Folk Songs of the Frontier (1955) with Harve Presnell, Richard Levitt, Capitol P-8332
  - Folk Songs of the Old World, Volumes 1 and 2 (1956) Capitol P 8387 (Vol. 1), P 8388 (Vol. 2), PBR 8345 (Vols. 1 & 2)
  - Joy to the World (1956) Capitol P(SP) 8353 CD:CDP 7 94688 2
  - House of the Lord (1957) Capitol P(SP) 8365
  - Songs of Latin America (1957) Capitol P 8408
  - Virtuoso (1958) Capitol P(SP)-8431 Grammy Award Winner, Produced with Ralph O'Connor
- Felix Slatkin conducting:
  - Saint-Saëns Carnival of the Animals (1954) with Victor Aller, Eleanor Aller, Harry Sukman and the Concert Arts Orchestra, Capitol P-8270, CTL 7069
  - Debussy Children's Corner Suite and Petite Suite (1955) Concert Arts Orchestra Capitol P-8328
  - Espana (1957) Hollywood Bowl Symphony Orchestra Capitol P(SP)-8357
  - Cello Galaxy (1959) Marni Nixon, Eleanor Aller with the Concert Arts Orchestra Capitol P(SP)-8484, (2010) re-issue: A Felix Slatkin Compendium-Stereo and Mono Recordings, 1954-1959 Pristine Classical PASC 218
  - Debussy Dances Sacrée et Profane (1959) with Marcel Grandjany, Concert Arts Orchestra Capitol P-8492
- Marcel Grandjany:
  - Pour le Harp (1957) Capitol P-8401
  - Music for the Harp (1958) Capitol P-8420 Grammy Award Nominee, Best Classical Performance Instrumental other than Concerto
  - Bach by Grandjany (1958) Capitol P-8459
  - Grandjany The Children's Hour; Rhapsodie pour le Harpe (1958) Capitol P(SP)-8492 reissue Seraphim 60412
- Leonard Pennario:
  - Ravel Miroirs and Garspard de la Nuit (1952) Capitol P-8152
  - Chopin Polonaise No. 6 in A flat, Op. 54 ("Heroic"), Debussy Suite Bergamasque-Claire De Lune, and Liszt Liebestraum No. 3 in A flat (1952) Capitol P-8156/CCL 7510
  - Waltzes (1952) Capitol P-8167
  - The Complete Chopin Waltzes (1952) Capitol P-8172/CTL 7027
  - Rachmaninoff Prelude in C sharp minor, Op. 3 No. 2, Prelude in G minor, Op. 23 No. 5, and Liszt Hungarian Rhapsody No. 2 in C sharp minor, S 157 (1952) Capitol H-8186 P-8312 CCL 7522
  - Piano Music of Spain (1952) Capitol P-8190 CTL 7054
  - Liszt Mephisto Waltz No.1, and Chopin Barcarolle in F sharp minor, Op. 60 (1953) Capitol P-8246 CCL 7523
  - Rachmaninoff Cello Sonata in G minor, Op. 19 (1953) with Joseph Schuster Capitol P-8248 CTL 7052
  - Mussorgsky Pictures at an Exhibition (1953) Capitol LAL-8266 CCL 7525
  - Delibes Naila-Waltz, Ravel La Valse, and Strauss Der Zigeunerbaron Walzer (1954) Capitol P-8294 CTL 7087
  - Albeniz Cantos de Espana, and Lecuona Andalucia (1954) Capitol P-8319
  - Bartók Piano Sonata, Rosza Piano Sonata, and Prokofiev Piano Sonata No. 3 in A, Op. 20 (1957) Capitol-8376
  - Franck Prelude, Fugue et Chorale, and Schumann Fantasia in C, Op. 17 (1957) Capitol P(SP)-8397
  - Keyboard Fantasies (1957) Capitol P-8391
- Salli Terri:
  - Songs of Enchantment (1959) with Laurindo Almeida, Hollywood String Quartet Capitol P(SP)-8482
  - At the Gate of Heaven (1959) Capitol P(SP)-8504
  - Songs of the American Land (1960) Capitol P(SP)-8522 Angel S-36085
  - I Know My Love (1961) with Laurindo Almeida Capitol P(SP)-8556
- Additional recordings:
  - Mozart Serenade in B flat, K361 (1952) Los Angeles Wind Ensemble, William Steinberg conducting
  - On Wings of Song (1955) Dorothy Warenskjold, Jack Crosson
  - Schubert Piano Trio No. 2 in E flat (1958) the Immaculate Heart Trio Capitol P-8442
  - Los Angeles Horn Club (1960) Capitol P(SP)-8525 reissue Seraphim S 60095, CD: EMI Studio 63764
  - Stories in Song (1961) William Clauson Capitol P(SP)-8539
