= Slatkin =

Slatkin is a surname. Notable people with the surname include:

- Felix Slatkin (1915–1963), American classical violinist and conductor
- Harry Slatkin (born 1960), American businessman
- Leonard Slatkin (born 1944), American conductor and composer
- Daniel Slatkin (born 1994), American film composer
- Montgomery Slatkin, American biologist
- Nora Slatkin (born 1955), United States Assistant Secretary of the Navy (Research, Development and Acquisitions) and Executive Director of the Central Intelligence Agency
- Reed Slatkin (born 1949), American fraudster
