= Duets with the Spanish Guitar =

Studio album by Laurindo Almeida
- Released: 1958
- Genre: Classical, Brazilian jazz
- Length: 55:18
- Label: Capitol
- Producer: Robert E. Myers

Laurindo Almeida chronology
Delightfully Modern (1957)	Duets with the Spanish Guitar (1958)	Contemporary Creations for the Spanish Guitar (1958)

Alternative cover
- 1990 release

Professional ratings
Review scores
Source	Rating
Allmusic	3/5 stars

Duets with the Spanish Guitar is an album by Brazilian guitarist Laurindo Almeida with vocalist Salli Terri and flautist Martin Ruderman. It was released by Capitol Records in 1958.

On the recording, Almeida arranged classical and folk repertoire with Latin musical forms.

== Reception ==
Recording engineer Sherwood Hall III won the Grammy Award for Best Engineered Classical Album at the first Grammy Awards in 1959. Salli Terri was nominated for Best Classical Vocal Performance. It has been reported that upon hearing her version of "Bachianas Brasilieras No. 5" from the album, composer Heitor Villa-Lobos stated that he considered it the best recorded performance of the work.

A critic in the 1958 issue of Hifi & Music Review wrote, "Laurindo Almeida's guitar playing captures the keen poignancy and rhythmic élan of Brazilian music with superb assurance and taste...Salli Terri sings Villa-Lobos Bachianas Brasileiras No. 5 with a sinuousness and ecstasy which makes this the finest modern version."

The album received extensive radio airplay and has sold consistently since it was released. In 1990, it was released by EMI on a CD titled Duets with Spanish Guitar with six bonus tracks.

In 2010, Duets with the Spanish Guitar was inducted into the Fanfare magazine Classical Recording Hall of Fame.

AllMusic gave the album three stars.

== Fans ==
In her memoir Simple Dreams, Linda Ronstadt wrote that her aunt, singer Luisa Espinel, was a friend of Salli Terri. "Knowing I wanted to sing, Aunt Luisa had sent me a recording, Duets with the Spanish Guitar, which featured guitarist Laurindo Almeida dueting alternately with flautist Martin Ruderman and soprano Salli Terri. It became one of my most cherished recordings." Ronstadt further states Luisa Espinel Ronstadt helped Terri research recordings and learn Spanish.

Duets with the Spanish Guitar is cited in the biography of poet Anne Sexton by Diane Wood Middlebrook. "They discovered they shared a passion for Laurindo Almeida's guitar rendition of Villa-Lobos's Bachianas Brasileiras. For years afterwards, the fluting voice of Salli Terri on that recording expressed for Sexton an epitome of feeling, a purity the poetry could never reach; its wordless rapture stood for the liberty of those days with Anne Wilder."

== Track listing ==
1. "Entr'acte" (Jacques Ibert) – 3:12
2. "Bachianas Brasileiras No. 5" (Heitor Villa-Lobos) – 2:24
3. "Ronde" (Émile Desportes) – 2:01
4. "Azulão" (Jaime Ovalle) – 1:28
5. "Prelude in E Minor" (Frédéric Chopin) – 2:13
6. "O Caçador" (Laurindo Almeida) – 1:47
7. "Pastorale Joyeuse" (Desportes) – 2:36
8. "Três Pontos de Santo" (Ovalle) – 4:06
9. "Tambourin" (François-Joseph Gossec) – 1:26
10. "Boi-Bumbá" (Waldemar Henrique) – 1:35
11. "Sicilienne" (Gabriel Fauré) – 4:00
12. "Para Niñar" (Paurillo Barroso) – 2:20
13. "Pièce en Forme de Habanera" (Maurice Ravel) – 2:45
14. "Maracatu" (Ernani Braga) – 3:33
15. "Pavane pour une infante défunte" (Ravel) – [bonus track] 3:53
16. "Passarinho Está Cantando" (Francisco Mignone) – [bonus track] 1:23
17. "Modinha" (Bandeiro, Ovalle) – [bonus track] 2:20
18. "Waltz from the Serenade for Strings" (Pyotr Ilyich Tchaikovsky) – [bonus track] 2:53
19. "Canción from Siete Canciones Populares Españolas" (Manuel de Falla) – [bonus track] 1:24
20. "Farrúca" (De Falla) – [bonus track] 2:38

== Personnel ==
- Laurindo Almeida – guitar
- Salli Terri – mezzo-soprano
- Martin Ruderman – flute
- Sherwood Hall III – engineer
- Robert E. Myers – producer

== Awards ==
- Sherwood Hall III, Grammy Award for Best Engineered Album, Classical
