= Close to You (Frank Sinatra album) =

Studio album by Frank Sinatra
- Released: January 22, 1957
- Recorded: March 8, April 4 – 5, November 1, 1956
- Studio: Capitol Studio A (Hollywood)
- Genres: Vocal jazz; traditional pop
- Length: 43:31
- Label: Capitol
- Producer: Voyle Gilmore

Frank Sinatra chronology
This Is Sinatra! (1956)	Close to You (1957)	A Swingin' Affair! (1957)

Professional ratings
Review scores
Source	Rating
Allmusic	4/5 stars
Encyclopedia of Popular Music	4/5 stars
Uncut	4/5 stars

Close to You is the eleventh studio album by American musician Frank Sinatra, accompanied by the Hollywood String Quartet. It was released on January 22, 1957.

The album was recorded over a period of eight months and five different sessions, and was arranged by Nelson Riddle.

Nelson Riddle commented that the structure of popular songs does not lend itself to arranging in the true string quartet style of the classics and felt that he hadn't really achieved as much as he had hoped. However, when the album was released it received critical praise and as Riddle remarked, "Sinatra liked it!".

For its CD release, the album was retitled Close to You and More, referencing the bonus tracks.

== Track listing ==
1. "Close to You" (Al Hoffman, Carl G. Lampl, Jerry Livingston) – 3:37
2. "P.S. I Love You" (Gordon Jenkins, Johnny Mercer) – 4:21
3. "Love Locked Out" (Max Kester, Ray Noble) – 2:41
4. "Everything Happens to Me" (Tom Adair, Matt Dennis) – 3:20
5. "It's Easy to Remember (And So Hard to Forget)" (Richard Rodgers, Lorenz Hart) – 3:34
6. "Don't Like Goodbyes" (Harold Arlen, Truman Capote) – 4:51
7. "With Every Breath I Take" (Ralph Rainger, Leo Robin) – 3:38
8. "Blame It on My Youth" (Edward Heyman, Oscar Levant) – 2:58
9. "It Could Happen to You" (Johnny Burke, Jimmy Van Heusen) – 3:13
10. "I've Had My Moments" (Walter Donaldson, Gus Kahn) – 3:47
11. "I Couldn't Sleep a Wink Last Night" (Harold Adamson, Jimmy McHugh) – 3:25
12. "The End of a Love Affair" (Edward Redding) – 4:11
  CD reissue bonus tracks not included on the original 1957 release:
13. "If It's the Last Thing I Do" (Sammy Cahn, Saul Chaplin) – 4:00
14. "There's a Flaw in My Flue" (Burke, Van Heusen) – 2:41
15. "Wait till You See Her" (Rodgers, Hart) – 3:08

== Personnel ==
- Frank Sinatra – vocals
- Nelson Riddle – arranger, conductor
- The Hollywood String Quartet:
  - Felix Slatkin – violin, leader
  - Paul Shure – violin
  - Eleanor Aller – cello
  - Alvin Dinkin – viola
