= Salli Terri =

- Born: September 3, 1922; London, Ontario, Canada
- Died: May 5, 1996 (aged 73) Long Beach, California, U.S.
- Genres: Classical; folk
- Occupations: Singer, arranger, composer, educator
- Instrument: Vocals
- Years active: 1950s–1990s
- Spouse: John Biggs

Salli C. Terri (September 3, 1922 – May 5, 1996) was a singer, arranger, recording artist, and composer. Record audiences still cite Terri's "haunting" vocals, with Hi-Fi Review originally describing her as "a mezzo soprano whose velvet voice and astonishing flexibility has hardly an equal at present."

== Background ==
Salli Terri was born Stella Tirri in London, Ontario, Canada. Her father, Sicilian-born Joseph Tirri, was a violinist and conductor. When Salli was a small child, the Tirri family moved to Detroit, Michigan.

Terri obtained her Bachelor of Arts degree in music from Wayne State University in Detroit and earned a master's degree in music from the University of Southern California. From 1950 to 1952, she taught music and drama at the American School in Japan (Chōfu, Tokyo).

== Early career ==
Terri joined the Roger Wagner Chorale in 1952 for its first tour of the western United States. In 1953, she performed with the group at the coronation celebration for Queen Elizabeth II in London.

Terri first became known to the record-buying public through her featured solos, musical arrangements and as the author of liner notes for best selling albums by the Roger Wagner Chorale released by Capitol Records. Her notable solos include: I Wonder as I Wander and Sometimes I Feel like a Motherless Child (Folk Songs of the New World US Capitol – P8324), Jesus, Jesus Rest Your Head on the gold record 1956 Christmas recording Joy To the World (US Capitol – P8353/SP8353), and Were You There from the 1957 House of the Lord (US Capitol – P8365/SP8365).

== Duets with the Spanish Guitar ==
In 1958, Salli Terri joined guitarist Laurindo Almeida and flautist Martin Ruderman on the Grammy winning Duets with the Spanish Guitar, an album widely considered to be the first classical crossover album. In this recording, Almeida arranges standard classical and folk repertoire through the prism of several Latin musical forms, including the modinha, charo, maracatu and boi bumba. The result, according to Hi-Fi and Music Review was "...a prize winner in my collection. Laurindo Almeida's guitar playing captures the keen poignancy and rhythmic élan of Brazilian music with superb assurance and taste...Salli Terri sings Villa-Lobos Bachianas Brasileiras No. 5 with a sinuousness and ecstasy which makes this the finest modern version. It has also been reported that composer Heitor Villa-Lobos considered the Almeida/Terri Bachianas Brasileiras "...the best recorded performance of this work."

The recording won for Best Classical Engineered Recording for engineer Sherwood Hall III at the first Grammy Awards ceremony (Grammy Awards of 1959). Terri was also nominated for Best Classical Vocal Performance. In her recent memoir Simple Dreams, singer Linda Ronstadt discusses Duets With the Spanish Guitar, noting her aunt, the renowned Spanish singer Luisa Espinel was a friend of Terri: "Knowing I wanted to sing, Aunt Luisa had sent me a recording, Duets with the Spanish Guitar, which featured guitarist Laurindo Almeida dueting alternately with flautist Martin Ruderman and soprano Salli Terri. It became one of my most cherished recordings."

The album, with additions from later recordings, was renamed Duets with Spanish Guitar, and re-released in 1990 on a CD in the United States (USA), Canada, the United Kingdom (UK), Germany, and France. The tracks are still available on internet music sites, and the album still continues to receive accolades. In 2010, Fanfare inducted Duets with the Spanish Guitar into its Classical Recording Hall of Fame.

The success of Duets with the Spanish Guitar led to additional recordings with Almeida, including the 1960 Conversations with the Guitar which won the Grammy Award for Best Classical Performance Vocal or Instrumental Chamber Music. While continuing to arrange and record with the Roger Wagner Chorale, Terri also embarked on a solo recording career, which resulted in seven LPs, including the albums Songs of Enchantment (Capitol P8482), At the Gate of Heaven (Capitol P8504) and Songs of the American Land with the Jack Halloran Quartet (Capitol P8522), produced by Robert E. Myers.

== Later career ==
Terri's eclectic repertoire included religious music, love songs, folk tunes and ballads. Her inclusive musical approach led to wide-ranging roles in Hollywood, academia, and concert performance. Her film work included Mary Poppins, Bells are Ringing, How the West Was Won, and Jerry Lewis's Cinderfella. Terri's vocals were also featured on early 1960s recordings Voodoo and Chant of the Moon by the classic lounge exotica by Robert Drasnin with composer John Williams on piano.

In addition to her recording career, Salli Terri was a professor of music and directed a woman's choir at UCLA, University of California, Santa Barbara and Fullerton (CA) Junior College. Her expertise in early American music, particularly in Shaker traditions, led in the composition of two works, Shaker Worship Service (1971) and A Moravian Lovefeast (1978) and more than 50 choral arrangements . She also edited two books of choral rounds, rounds for everyone from everywhere (1961) and around the year in rounds (1974). Her performing career continued with frequent appearances with the John Biggs Consort, led by her husband composer John Biggs which featured medieval and Renaissance music. Note: some sources incorrectly refer to Laurindo Almeida as Terri's husband. Almeida and Terri were not married.

Her most widely known recording, the first part of section 5 from Bachianas Brasileiras, was featured in the film Fifty Shades of Grey (2014) as well as at the Winter Olympics.

== Terri's musical perspective ==
A 1960 Toronto Telegram profile of Terri included this observation from the singer/composer/arranger:

"I don't like words or phrases like 'longhair' or 'the classics' or 'pops' or 'easy listening'…they are 'dividing lines'; words which reinforce and perpetuate outmoded narrow prejudices instead of sweeping them aside. To me, the whole world of music is so wide and deep and exciting that there just never will be enough hours in a day or days in a week to let me hear and sing and soak up all the marvelous things available…We all strongly believe there are many different kinds of good music and we are opposed to musical snobbery wherever it exists."

The author Clyde Gilmour observed "the 'we' included her friend and colleague Laurindo Almeida, the renowned guitarist…conductor Roger Wagner…a flute virtuoso named Martin Ruderman, and Robert E Myers, a Capitol Records executive who often supervises her albums."

== Death ==
Salli Terri died on May 5, 1996, in Long Beach, California, US after a series of strokes.

== Legacy ==
Salli's original vinyl recordings can often still be found on eBay and in vintage record stores, and are collected worldwide. Her most popular recording, Duets With the Spanish Guitar, has been continuously reissued since its first print, and is a consistent seller (on CD) on Amazon.com and other online outlets.

Terri was married to singer-composer John Biggs' (born 1932) and their daughters, Jennifer Biggs Walton and Adrienne Biggs, are both musicians. Walton is a violinist and owns Instrumental Casting, an agency which casts musicians in film, television, video and commercial work. Adrienne plays the violin and performs with Danny Click and the Hell Yeahs, a California Bay Area band whose recent recordings have hit the Americana country music charts.

A UK-based fan created a tribute site, www.salliterri.org, which has an extensive discography, photos, and notes from fans as well as former friends and students.

== Discography ==
Solo Discography (LP) :

- I Know My Love (1961)
- Songs of the American Land (1960)
- At the Gate of Heaven (1960)
- Songs of Enchantment (1959)
- For My True Love (1959)

Books and scores by Salli Terri :

- Rounds For Everyone From Everywhere (1961)
- Shaker Worship Service (1971)
- Around The Year In Rounds (1974)
- A Moravian Lovefeast (1978)
