= Victor Aller =

American pianist

Victor Aller (March 26, 1905, New York City – May 1977, in the area of Los Angeles, California) was an American pianist.

He had a successful career behind the scenes in the film industry, and he taught piano in Hollywood, where his students sometimes included actors preparing to depict musicians on screen, such as Dirk Bogarde and Cornel Wilde. His present fame, however, rests primarily on his performances in acclaimed 1950s-vintage Capitol Records recordings with the Hollywood String Quartet, including accounts of piano quintets by Johannes Brahms, César Franck, and Dmitri Shostakovich, and the Brahms piano quartets.

Aller had family and professional ties to the quartet. His sister, Eleanor Aller, was its cellist, and her husband, Felix Slatkin, was its first violinist. They and the other quartet members were all musicians with the Hollywood studios of the era, and Victor Aller was the orchestra manager at Warner Bros. during the 1940s; by 1949, his hourly earnings amounted to $19.95 according to company records. Aller was married to violinist Ester Heller whom he met while both were attending Juilliard.

A Warner film in which Victor Aller had direct input was The Beast with Five Fingers. Mr. Aller made a piano arrangement for the left hand of the Chaconne from J. S Bach's Violin Partita in D minor, and, according to a press release, he spent 200 hours training actor Victor Francen in proper technique. Victor Aller's hand was used when the hand plays the piano in the film. Victor sat underneath the piano, wearing black velvet on his arm, so that the hand appeared disembodied. For Song Without End Victor provided technical instruction to Dirk Bogarde, who played the leading role of Franz Liszt.

Aller's musical heritage lives on with relatives in succeeding generations. His daughter is concert violinist Judith Aller, and son Richard Aller a student of Jascha Heifetz; his nephew, son of Felix Slatkin and Eleanor Aller, is noted American orchestra conductor Leonard Slatkin. Leonard's brother, Frederick Zlotkin, an outstanding cellist, is the principal solo cello of the New York City Ballet, and a member of the Lyric Piano Quartet.
