= Laurindo Almeida =

Brazilian guitarist and composer (1917–1995)

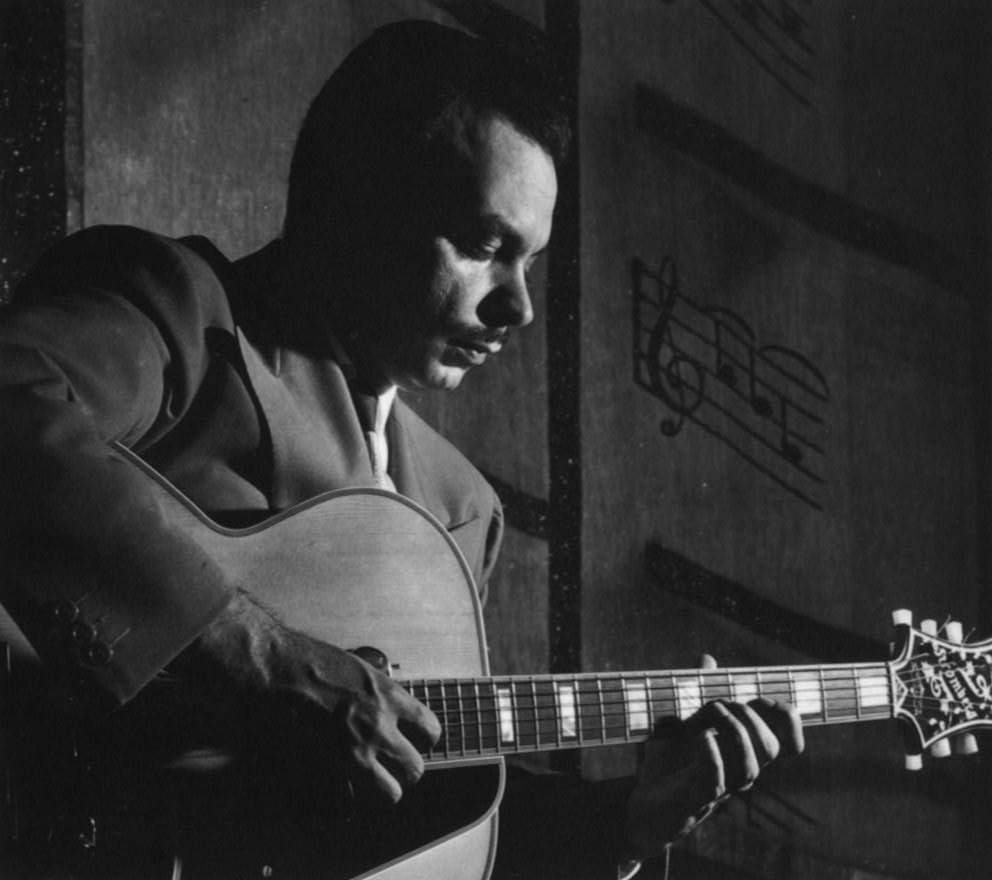
- Almeida circa 1947/48

Background information
- Birth name: Laurindo José de Araújo Almeida Nóbrega Neto
- Born: 2 September 1917; Iguape, São Paulo, Brazil
- Died: 26 July 1995 (aged 77); Los Angeles, California, U.S.
- Genres: Classical, jazz, bossa nova
- Occupation(s): Musician, composer
- Instrument: Guitar
- Years active: 1930s–1995
- Labels: World Pacific, Capitol

Laurindo José de Araújo Almeida Nóbrega Neto (2 September 1917 – 26 July 1995) was a Brazilian guitarist and composer in classical, jazz, and Latin music. He was one of the pioneers in the creation of bossa nova. Almeida was the first guitarist to receive Grammy Awards for both classical and jazz performances. His discography encompasses more than a hundred recordings over five decades.

== Background ==
Laurindo José de Araújo Almeida Nobrega Neto was born in the village of Prainha, Brazil near Santos in the state of São Paulo.

Born into a musical family, Almeida was a self-taught guitarist. During his teenage years, Almeida moved to São Paulo, where he worked as a radio artist, staff arranger and nightclub performer. At the age of 19, he worked his way to Europe playing guitar in a cruise ship orchestra. In Paris, he attended a performance at the Hot Club de France by Stéphane Grappelli and famed guitarist Django Reinhardt, who became a lifelong artistic inspiration.

Returning to Brazil, Almeida continued composing and performing. He became known for playing both classical Spanish and popular guitar. He moved to the United States in 1947; a trip financed when one of his compositions, a song known as "Johnny Peddler" became a hit recorded by the Andrews Sisters. In Los Angeles, Almeida immediately went to work in film studio orchestras.

== Early career in the United States ==
Almeida was first introduced to the jazz public as a featured guitarist with the Stan Kenton band in the late 1940s during the height of its success. According to author Michael Sparke, Almeida and his fellow Kenton bandmember drummer Jack Costanzo "endowed the music of Progressive Jazz with a persuasive Latin flavor, and the music is enriched by their presence." Famed Kenton arranger Pete Rugolo composed "Lament" specifically for Almeida's cool, quiet sound, and Almeida's own composition "Amazonia" was also featured by the Kenton orchestra. Almeida stayed with Kenton until 1952.

Almeida's recording career enjoyed auspicious early success with the 1953 recordings now called Brazilliance No. 1 and No. 2 with fellow Kenton alumnus Bud Shank, bassist Harry Babasin, and drummer Roy Harte on the World Pacific label (originally entitled "The Laurindo Almeida Quartet featuring Bud Shank"). Widely regarded as "landmark" recordings, Almeida and Shank's combination of Brazilian and jazz rhythms (which Almeida labeled "samba-jazz"-) presaged the fusion of Latin and jazz, which is quite different in bossa nova, although jazz critic Leonard Feather credited Almeida and Shank as the creators of bossa nova sound.

Other observers note that the beat, harmonic stamp, and economy of expression were different from the bossa nova, giving Almeida and Shank's recording "...a different mood and sound...certainly valuable in its own right."

Almeida's classical solo recording career on Capitol Records began in 1954 with The Guitar Music of Spain. Almeida made a series of highly successful classical recordings produced by Robert E. Myers. Among Almeida's notable classical recordings is an album widely considered to be the first classical crossover album, the 1958 Grammy winner Duets with the Spanish Guitar with mezzo-soprano Salli Terri and flutist Martin Ruderman. In this recording, Almeida arranges standard classical and folk repertoire through the prism of several Latin musical forms, including the modenha, charo, maracatu and boi bumba. The result, according to Hi-Fi and Music Review was "...a prize winner in my collection. Laurindo Almeida's guitar playing captures the keen poignancy and rhythmic élan of Brazilian music with superb assurance and taste ...". The recording was nominated for two Grammy Awards and won for Best Classical Engineering for Sherwood Hall III at the first Grammy Awards ceremony. In her recent memoir Simple Dreams, singer Linda Ronstadt discusses Duets With the Spanish Guitar and notes that her aunt, the renowned Spanish singer Luisa Espinel was a friend of vocalist Salli Terri: "Knowing I wanted to sing, Aunt Luisa had sent me a recording, Duets with the Spanish Guitar, which featured guitarist Laurindo Almeida dueting alternately with flautist Martin Ruderman and soprano Salli Terri. It became one of my most cherished recordings."

Of Almeida's five career Grammys, four were awarded in classical categories. His classical recording discography also includes the debut recordings of two major guitar works, Heitor Villa-Lobos' Guitar Concerto and Radamés Gnattali's Concerto de Copacabana.

In 1964, Almeida again expanded his recording repertoire by joining forces with the Modern Jazz Quartet on Collaboration (Atlantic Records), which combined classical with jazz, called "chamber jazz." Almeida also toured with the MJQ, both in the 1960s and again in the 1990s.

== Film and television ==
In addition to his recording achievements, Almeida continued his work with the film studios throughout his career, playing guitar, lute, mandolin and other instruments for more than 800 motion picture and television soundtracks (such as The High Chaparral and "The Gift," an episode of The Twilight Zone). Almeida made cameo appearances in the 1954 movie A Star is Born and on a 1959 episode of Peter Gunn titled "Skin Deep". His performing credits included major motion pictures such as Good-bye, My Lady (1956), Funny Girl (1968), and The Godfather (1972). He composed the complete film scores for ten motion pictures and portions for hundreds of others, including Charles and Ray Eames's 1957 film Day of the Dead. He also underscored and performed for Clint Eastwood's Unforgiven (1992). His final film work was in The Cat in the Hat (2003) in which his whistling cover of "The Girl from Ipanema" is briefly heard. Some articles report Almeida won at least one Oscar award for film composition; however, while he was involved in films that were nominated, he did not receive an Oscar for his film work.

== Later career ==
In the 1970s, Almeida reunited with Bud Shank, forming The L.A. Four with Ray Brown and Chuck Flores (later Shelly Manne and then Jeff Hamilton). From 1974 to 1982, the L.A. Four toured internationally and recorded a series of albums for Concord Jazz, including The L.A. Four Scores!, an acclaimed live recording from the 1974 Concord Jazz Festival. In 1980, Almeida joined forces with Charlie Byrd on a series of highly regarded recordings, including Latin Odyssey, Brazilian Soul and Tango. He also recorded with Baden Powell, Stan Getz and Herbie Mann, among others. His guitar trio, Guitarjam, with Larry Coryell and Sharon Isbin played Carnegie Hall in 1988. In the 1990s, Almeida toured again with the Modern Jazz Quartet. In 1992, Concord Records issued Outra Vez, an October 1991 live recording with bassist Bob Magnusson and drummer Jim Plank; JazzTimes wrote that Outra Vez was "...a testament to his enduring genius as a concert guitarist, composer and arranger".

In discussing Outra Vez, John Storm Roberts noted "...there was nothing retro about its tour de force, a phenomenal duet of Almeida performing Beethoven's 'Moonlight Sonata' while bassist Bob Magnusson played Thelonious Monk's 'Round Midnight.'"

== Awards and honors ==
Laurindo Almeida was nominated for sixteen Grammys and received the award five times:

- 1960 The Spanish Guitars of Laurindo Almeida Best Classical Performance Instrumental Soloist or Duo
- 1960 Conversations with the Guitar Best Classical Performance Vocal or Instrumental Chamber Music
- 1961 Discantus Best Contemporary Classical Composition (tied with Igor Stravinsky)
- 1961 Reverie for Spanish Guitars Best Classical Performance Instrumental Soloist without Orchestra
- 1964 Guitar from Ipanema Best Instrumental Jazz Performance-Large Group

In 1992, he was honored with the Latin American & Caribbean Cultural Society Award for "his illustrious career as a performer and composer and his dedicated promotion of the music of the Americas." Shortly before his death, the Brazilian government honored Almeida, awarding him the "Comendador da Ordem do Rio Branco." In 2010, Fanfare inducted his 1958 Duets with the Spanish Guitar into its Classical Recording Hall of Fame.

== Death ==
Almeida was teaching, recording and performing until the week before his death of leukemia on July 26, 1995, at age 77 in Los Angeles, California.

== Legacy ==
Laurindo Almeida's archives are housed at the US Library of Congress and at California State University, Northridge. He composed more than 1000 separate pieces, including 200 popular songs. In 1952 Almeida formed his own publishing company, Brazilliance, which has been influential in the dissemination of Latin American music. As described by authors Chris McGowan and Ricardo Pessanha, Laurindo Almeida was "...an artist known for his harmonic mastery, subtle dynamics, rich embellishments and adept improvisatory skills in a variety of idioms".

In 2004 Almeida's guitar work from his version of The Lamp Is Low was sampled by the Japanese DJ and producer Nujabes for the song "Aruarian Dance" which features on the soundtrack to the anime series Samurai Champloo.

== Discography ==
=== As leader ===
- Guitar Music of Spain (Capitol, 1955)
- Guitar Music of Latin America (Capitol, 1955)
- Impressoes do Brasil (Capitol, 1957)
- Guitar Solos (Coral, 1957)
- The New World of the Guitar (Capitol, 1957)
- Duets with the Spanish Guitar with Martin Ruderman and Salli Terri (Capitol, 1958)
- Maracaibo (Decca, 1958)
- Contemporary Creations for the Spanish Guitar (Capitol, 1958)
- Danzas (Capitol, 1959)
- Happy Cha-Cha-Cha! (Capitol, 1959)
- Songs of Enchantment (Capitol, 1959)
- For My True Love (Capitol, 1959)
- The Intimate Bach, Duets with the Spanish Guitar Vol.2 (Capitol, 1960)
- Villa Lobos: Music for the Spanish Guitar (Capitol, 1960)
- Vistas de Espana (Capitol, 1960)
- Conversations with the Guitar (Capitol, 1960)
- The Spanish Guitars of Laurindo Almeida (Capitol, 1961)
- The Guitar Worlds of Laurindo Almeida (Capitol, 1961)
- Brazilliance (World Pacific, 1962)
- Reverie for Spanish Guitars (Capitol, 1962)
- It's a Bossa Nova World, 'Laurindo Almeida All Stars,' including Howard Roberts, Jimmy Rowles, Bob Cooper, Victor Feldman and Shelly Manne (Capitol, 1962)
- Viva Bossa Nova! as by Laurindo Almeida and the Bossa Nova All Stars (Capitol, 1962) (No. 9 on the Billboard Top LPs)
- Acapulco '22 (Tower, 1963)
- Broadway Solo Guitar (Capitol, 1964)
- Guitar from Ipanema (Capitol, 1964)
- New Broadway-Hollywood Hits (Capitol, 1965)
- Sueños (Capitol, 1965)
- A Man and a Woman (Capitol, 1967)
- The Look of Love and the Sounds of Laurindo Alemeida (Capitol, 1968)
- Classical Current (Warner Bros.-Seven Arts Records, 1969)
- Bach Ground Blues & Greens (Century City, 1970)
- The Art of Laurindo Alemeida (Orion, 1972)
- The Best of Everything (Daybreak, 1972)
- The Golden Hits of the Masters—Today! (Daybreak, 1973)
- Bach Is Beautiful (Orion, 1972)
- Latin Guitar (Dobre, 1976)
- Virtuoso Guitar (Crystal Clear, 1977)
- Concierto de Aranjuez (East Wind, 1978)
- Chamber Jazz (Concord, 1977)
- Prelude: Romantic Studies for the Guitar (Angel, 1979)
- New Directions (Crystal Clear, 1979)
- Clair de Lune (Angel, 1980)
- First Concerto for Guitar and Orchestra (Concord, 1980)
- Brazilian Soul with Charlie Byrd (Concord Picante, 1981)
- Selected Classical Works for Guitar and Flute with Bud Shank (Concord, 1982)
- Latin Odyssey with Charlie Byrd (Concord Jazz, 1983)
- 3 Guitars 3 with Sharon Isbin and Larry Coryell (ProArte, 1985)
- Tango with Charlie Byrd (Concord, 1985)
- Music of the Brazilian Masters with Charlie Byrd and Carlos Barbosa-Lima (Concord 1989)
- Outra Vez (Concord Picante, 1992)

With The L.A. 4

- The L.A. Four Scores! (Concord Jazz, 1975)
- The L.A. 4 (Concord Jazz, 1976)
- Going Home (East Wind, 1977)
- Pavane pour une infante défunte (East Wind, 1977)
- Watch What Happens (Concord Jazz, 1978)
- Just Friends (Concord Jazz, 1978)
- Live at Montreux (Concord Jazz, 1979)
- Zaca (Concord Jazz, 1980)
- Montage (Concord Jazz, 1981)
- Executive Suite (Concord Jazz, 1983)

=== As sideman ===
With Stan Kenton

- Encores (Capitol, 1947)
- A Presentation of Progressive Jazz (Capitol, 1947)
- Stan Kenton's Milestones (Capitol, 1950)
- Innovations in Modern Music (Capitol, 1950)
- Stan Kenton Presents (Capitol, 1950)
- Stan Kenton Classics (Capitol, 1952)
- Popular Favorites by Stan Kenton (Capitol, 1953)
- The Kenton Era (Capitol, 1955)
- Lush Interlude (Capitol, 1958)
- Artistry in Voices and Brass (Capitol, 1963)
- The Innovations Orchestra (Capitol, 1997)

With Pete Rugolo

- New Sounds by Pete Rugolo (Harmony, 1957)
- Behind Brigitte Bardot (Warner Bros., 1960)
- The Original Music of Thriller (Time, 1961)

With Bud Shank

- Holiday in Brazil (World Pacific, 1959) – rec. 1958
- Latin Contrasts (World Pacific, 1959) – rec. 1958

With others

- Harry Belafonte, To Wish You a Merry Christmas (RCA Victor, 1958)
- Harry Belafonte, Belafonte Sings the Blues (RCA Victor, 1959)
- Bobby Darin, Bobby Darin Sings The Shadow of Your Smile (Atlantic Records, 1966)
- Sammy Davis Jr., Sammy Davis Jr. Sings and Laurindo Almeida Plays (Reprise, 1966)
- Peggy Lee, Guitars a là Lee (Capitol, 1966)
- Herbie Mann, The Magic Flute of Herbie Mann (Verve, 1957)
- The Modern Jazz Quartet, Collaboration (Atlantic, 1964)
- Oliver Nelson, Skull Session (Flying Dutchman, 1975)
- Van Dyke Parks, Discover America (Warner Bros., 1972)
- Shorty Rogers, Bossa Nova (Reprise, 1962)
- Lalo Schifrin, Gone with the Wave (Colpix, 1964)
- Carly Simon, Another Passenger (Elektra, 1976)
- Frank Sinatra, Sinatra Sings Days of Wine and Roses, Moon River, and Other Academy Award Winners (Reprise, 1964)
- Frank Sinatra, My Kind of Broadway (Reprise, 1965)
- Stan Getz, Stan Getz with Guest Artist Laurindo Almeida (Verve, 1966)
- Gerald Wilson, The Golden Sword (Pacific Jazz, 1966)
