= Virtuoso Guitar (Laurindo Almeida album) =

Studio album by Laurindo Almeida
- Released: 1977
- Recorded: November – December 1976
- Studio: Kendun Recorders, Burbank, California
- Genre: Jazz, classical
- Label: Crystal Clear
- Producer: Ed Wodenjak

Virtuoso Guitar is an album released by Laurindo Almeida in 1977 on Crystal Clear CCS 8001. The album was recorded direct-to-disc, and uses the 45 rpm format. The recording is a blend of jazz and classical music.

== Track listing ==
Side one:

1. "Yesterday" (Lennon - McCartney)
2. "Jazz Tuno at the Mission" (Almeida)
3. "Late Last Night" (Almeida)

Side Two:

1. Radamés Gnattali (1906–1988): Sonata for Guitar and Cello in Three Movements

- Allegro - Comodo
- Adagio
- Com Espirito

== Personnel ==
- Laurindo Almeida - guitar
- Chuck Domanico - bass
- Clare Fischer - acoustic/electric piano
- Chuck Flores - drums
- Emil Richards - 'vibes'/marimba
- Aime Maurice Vereeck - percussion
- Frederick Seykora - cello
