= Yvonne Desportes =

French composer and writer

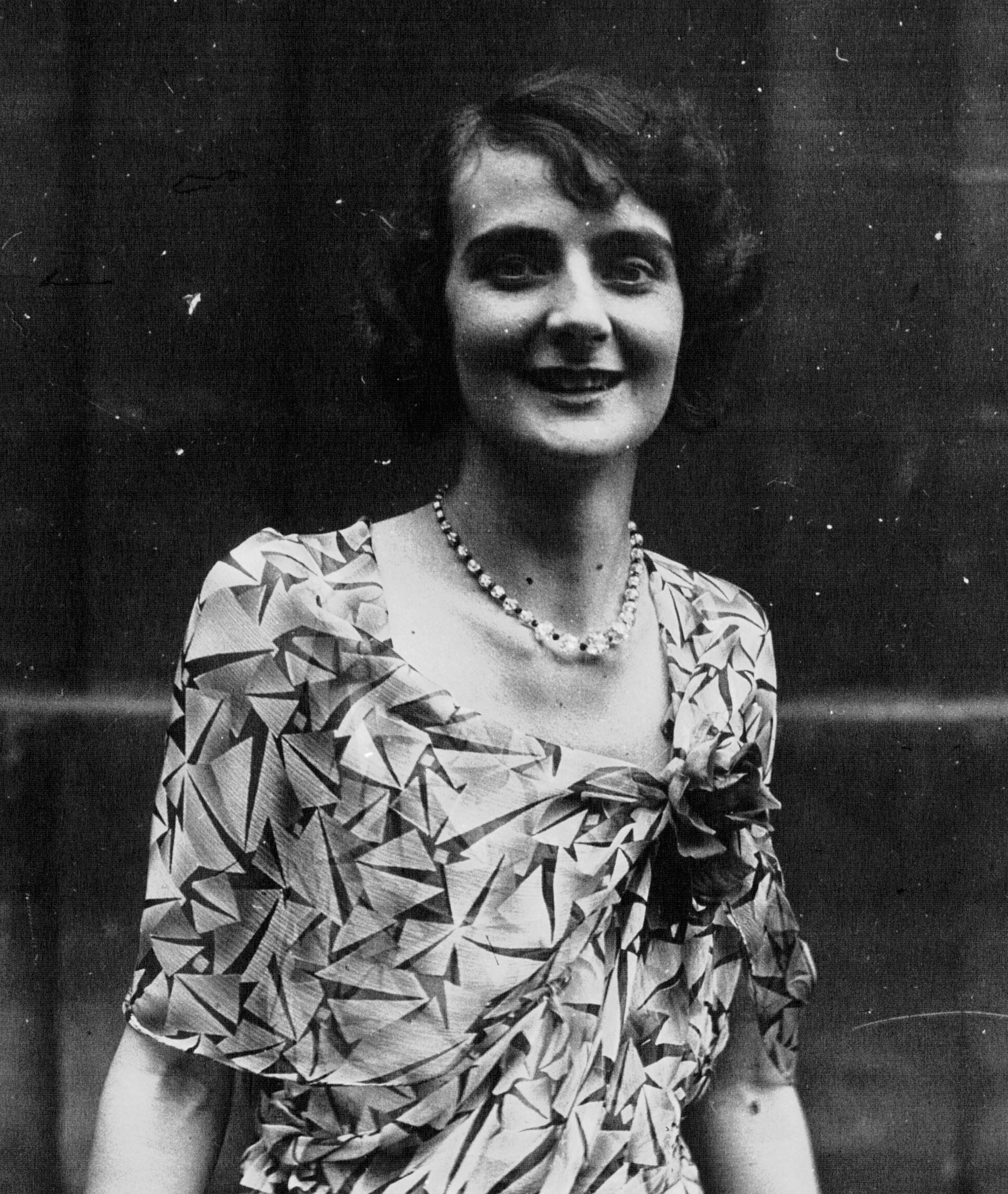
Yvonne Desportes 1930

Yvonne Desportes (18 July 1907 – 29 December 1993) was a French composer, writer, and music educator. She was born in Coburg, Germany, to Émile Desportes, a composer, and Bertha Froriep, a painter. She was a student of Paul Dukas and won the Premier Grand Prix de Rome in 1932. She taught at the Paris Conservatoire and wrote many music textbooks. She composed over 500 works.

== Education ==
She studied piano with Yvonne Lefébure and Alfred Cortot. She took a preparatory solfege class at the Paris Conservatoire in 1918. She studied for three years at the École Normale de Musique and then attended the Conservatoire National Supérieur de Paris from 1925 to 1932. She took classes from Jean and Noël Gallon, Marcel Dupré, Maurice Emmanuel, and Paul Dukas, whose class is pictured below.

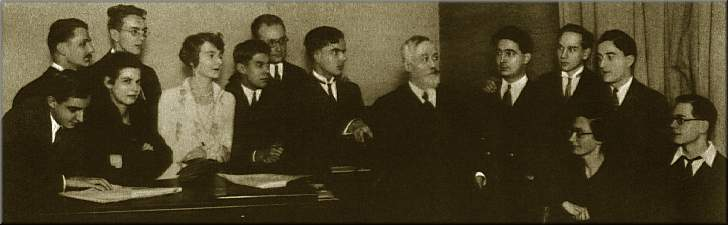
Classe-dukas

== Prix de Rome ==
In 1927, Desportes won the Premier Prix in harmony. In 1928 she won the Premier Prix in fugue. She competed for the Prix de Rome four times. In 1929 she did not advance to the second round. In 1930 she won the Deuxième Second Grand Prix. Paul Bertrand's review of Desportes's cantata Actéon, which appeared in Le Ménestrel, remarked on her harmonic conception and on her femininity: "On the whole it is conceived harmonically and not contrapuntally, solidly established from the beginning in the tonality of E within which she deploys pleasant drumming chords. It is all delicacy, all femininity, attested by a marked predilection for ternary measures and rhythms, evoking with a pleasant spontaneaity, a touching freshness of feeling."

In 1931 she won the Premier Second Grand Prix. Paul Bertrand wrote in his annual review that "Her Cantata was perhaps, out of all of them, the most homogeneous and the most skilful [sic] by a keen sense of progressions and contrast. But it seemed to last somewhat both scope and real senstivitiy". She beat Henriette Puig-Roget who won the Deuxième Second Grand Prix. Two females had never won these prizes in the same year before.

In 1932 Desportes won the Premier Grand Prix. Paul Betrand wrote: "Mlle. Desportes possesses a real sensitivity and a precious gift for dramatic expression. She found herself at ease in the interpretation of a text of clearly theatrical nature. Without sacrificing to excess the intrinsic quality of the music, she subordinated it to the drama, and notably gave to the Romance a colour at once simple and moving, enveloped the drinking song in a picturesque fantasy."

Her cantata was also praised for its unified cyclic structure. In her dissertation Musiciennes: Women Musicians in France during the Interwar Years, 1919-1939, Laura Ann Hamer discusses Desportes's win and her life struggles.

The Institut de France's "awarding of the Premier Grand Prix to Desportes in 1931 [sic], at a time when the French government actively sought to marginalise women within the domestic sphere and to exclude them from public life, suggests that women were sufficiently accepted by the Académie des Beaux-Arts to allow them to award their highest prize to a young mother, whose divorce and determination to succeed as a musician represented a significant flouting of normal social conventions in interwar France".

== Teaching career ==
At the Villa Médicis, she met and wed Ulysse Gemignani, Premier Grand Prix de Rome in sculpture. In 1932 she ended her position as harmony tutor at the Conservatoire. When she returned she found the same position except teaching solfège from 1937 to 1938. Then she wrote her famous Leçons de solfège. At the beginning of 1943 she became a tenured professor in solfège then, in 1959, a professor of counterpoint and fugue.

Desportes wrote 332 instrumental works (159 vocal works and 31 music textbooks). These works include three symphonies, a requiem and eight operas. Her compositional style, though influenced by the Baroque period, swayed more toward the "rich orchestral palette of the Russian Five […] and the harmonic language of Ravel and early Stravinsky." Despite being an active composer and music educator, Desportes also took her family life seriously. When an interviewer asked if they had forgotten any aspect of her career she responded, "yes, the part which relates to my sons: eleven and thirteen years old. And to my older daughter: seventeen years old."

== Compositional style ==
A composer with a sense of humor, in her Variations sur le nom de Beethoven for orchestra (1974), not only is each letter of the composer's first and last name transcribed by a note (with enormous intervals between each one), but one detects allusions to his 5th Symphony in the middle of a personal melody. In Pavane pour un timbalier dèfunt: A Félix Passerone in memoriam (Pavane for a deceased timpanist: For Félix Passerone, former principal timpanist of the Paris Opera and teacher at the Conservatoire). The work is for military drum or snare drum accompanying singers forced to sing “tataralatatarasa… tiguidiguiditatalota…” punctuated by the interjection given in the subtitle… “Scrogneugneu!” (which translates to Humph!)

The use of a name represented by notes was also used in Desportes’s saxophone and harp duet, Une fleur sur l’étang (a flower on the pond). Idit Shner wrote, "The third movement […] is dedicated to [Daniel] Kientzy through the incorporation of his name in the music. Beginning in measure 51 […] letters appear above each pitch in the saxophone and harp line. The letters spell "Daniel Kientzy" forwards and backwards (prime and retrograde)."

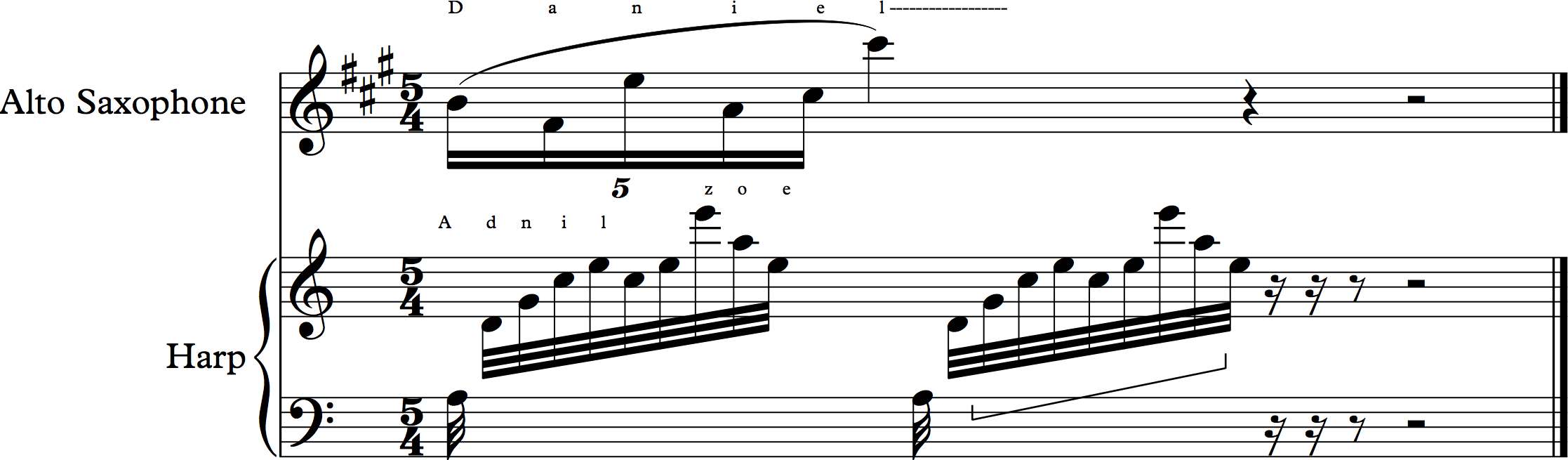
The name Daniel is used in this score.

== Reviews ==
In his review of Desportes' brass quintet Imageries d'antan (Imageries of yesteryear), Donald Johns describes her use of meter and compositional style. "As the title suggests, this is a programmatic work, and each of the three movements reflects a different character: the first, a driving, fanfare-type movement, expresses a martial character; the second, a love duet, is musically realized by trumpet and trombone; and the third, a lively dance with intense use of changing meters, includes a host of variations in the subdivision of eight-eight and ten-eight meters. The changing meters are employed à la Stravinsky to enhance the flexibility of the phrase structure – all very organic and logical. Though it is dedicated "au merveilleux Quintette de l’Orchestre National de France", the work is not an orgy of technical display. Despite a fair amount of high tessitura playing, especially for the first trumpet, the work is, in general, comfortably written, and filled with the coloration of quartal and polyharmonies that are surefire staples of brass writing. All in all, a successful job of solid, satisfying, and typical moments in some works by Honegger and Milhaud."

In a book written by Michel Gemingnani, Desportes's son, Gemignani collected tributes from colleagues and students of his mother:

"You reaped numerous prizes at the Conservatoire National Supérieur de Paris, but you learned to develop an inner sense of beautiful work, music that breathes with the heart, and devotion to others." Marcel Landownski, 14 November 1994, French composer, 1915-1999.

"I always was (and still am) dazzled by the number of works that she wrote, and by the facility with which it came out of her pen. […] Her music, always spontaneous and lively, sometimes willingly displayed a rebelliously humoristic and anti-conformist spirit rare in contemporary music. […] She had a sufficiently open spirit to discern that which was valuable and incorporate certain techniques in her own music, not to be 'modern', but because she saw the expressive possibilities she could draw." Jacques Casterede, French composer, 1926-2014.

"Pedagogy, outside of the transmission of knowledge, implies a high sensitivity and a psychological sense adapted to the students oh which one must guess slow progress, hesitations, and trial and error. Yvonne Desportes possessed these faculties in the highest form, knowing to be strict, severe even when he fails, but also encourage the student when he loses his step." Jean Podromides, French composer, 1926-.

Desportes retired from the Conservatoire in 1978. She was awarded the Chevalier de l'Ordre National du Mérite. Hamer describes how Desportes "wrote a number of works for her eldest son, the percussionist Vincent Gemignani, including the Concerto pour percussion et orchestre (1963). In doing this, she became one of the first composers to write a concerto for percussion, and contributed to its elevation to solo status. She also experimented with writing for the new percussion instrument which he invented: la bronte.” The bronte is described as "an extraordinary musical instrument made of nickel silver, which has metal keyboards amplified by a resonator. Played with a bow or with hammers, this 'sound sculpture' can produce a wide array of sounds (spreading from the absolute deepest to the very highest) in totally original colours and uncommonly sensual keys which are both profound and mysterious."

Yvonne Desportes died in 1993 in Paris.

== Works ==
Desportes composed over five hundred works, including opera, symphonies, ballets, concertos, chamber music, and vocal and solo instrumental music. Selected works include:

- La Foire aux Croûtes, 12 miniatures for percussion and piano (The Flea Market)
- Passionette: pour chant et piano
- La Danse De Xylonette
- Sonate Pour Un Bapteme
- Suite Italienne
- 20 petites pièces en forme d'études pour xylophone
- Sicilienne et Allegro, for horn and piano (1932)
- Trifaldin, ballet (1935)
- Le Rossignol et l'Orvet, opéra (1936)
- Les 7 Péchés capitaux, ballet (1938)
- French Suite for four Bb clarinets (1939)
- Maître Cornelius, opéra (1940) d'après Balzac
- La farce du carabinier, opéra (1943)
- Ballade Normande, for horn and piano (1943)
- Variations symphoniques (1946)
- Improvisation, for horn and piano (1953)
- Concerto pour percussion n°1 (1957)
- Symphonie n°1 Saint-Gingolph (1958)
- Concerto pour percussion n°2 (1960)
- Voyage au-delà d'un miroir, pour 3 percussions (1963)
- Symphonie n°2 Monorythmie (1964)
- Vision cosmique, pour 3 percussions avec bronté(1964)
- Le Forgeur de merveilles, opéra (1965) d'après O'Brien
- Symphonie n°3 L'Éternel féminin (1969)
- Au-delà de la prière pour bronté et orchestre à cordes (1970)
- Sextuor La maison abandonnée
- Octuor pour quatuor vocal et quatuor à cordes
- Quatuor
- Quintette
- Ambiances pour soprano et 2 percussions
- 7 Poèmes abstraits pour chœur mixte et percussion
- 8 Pièces vocales pour soli, chœur et orchestre
- Les amis de toujours pour chœur mixte
- Des chansons dans la coulisse pour trombone et piano
- L'horloge jazzante pour saxophone et guitare

== Sources ==
- Hamer, Laura Ann: Musiciennes: Women Musicians in France during the Interwar Years, 1919-1939 (Ph.D. diss., Cardiff University, 2009).
- Vilcosqui, Marcel-Jean: "Yvonne DESPORTES", in: Compositrices françaises au XXème siècle, edited by Jean Roy (Sampzon, FR: Éditions Delatour France, 2007).
- Gemignani, Michel: "Yvonne Desportes" (Paris, Gemingnani, 1995).
