= Daniel Slatkin =

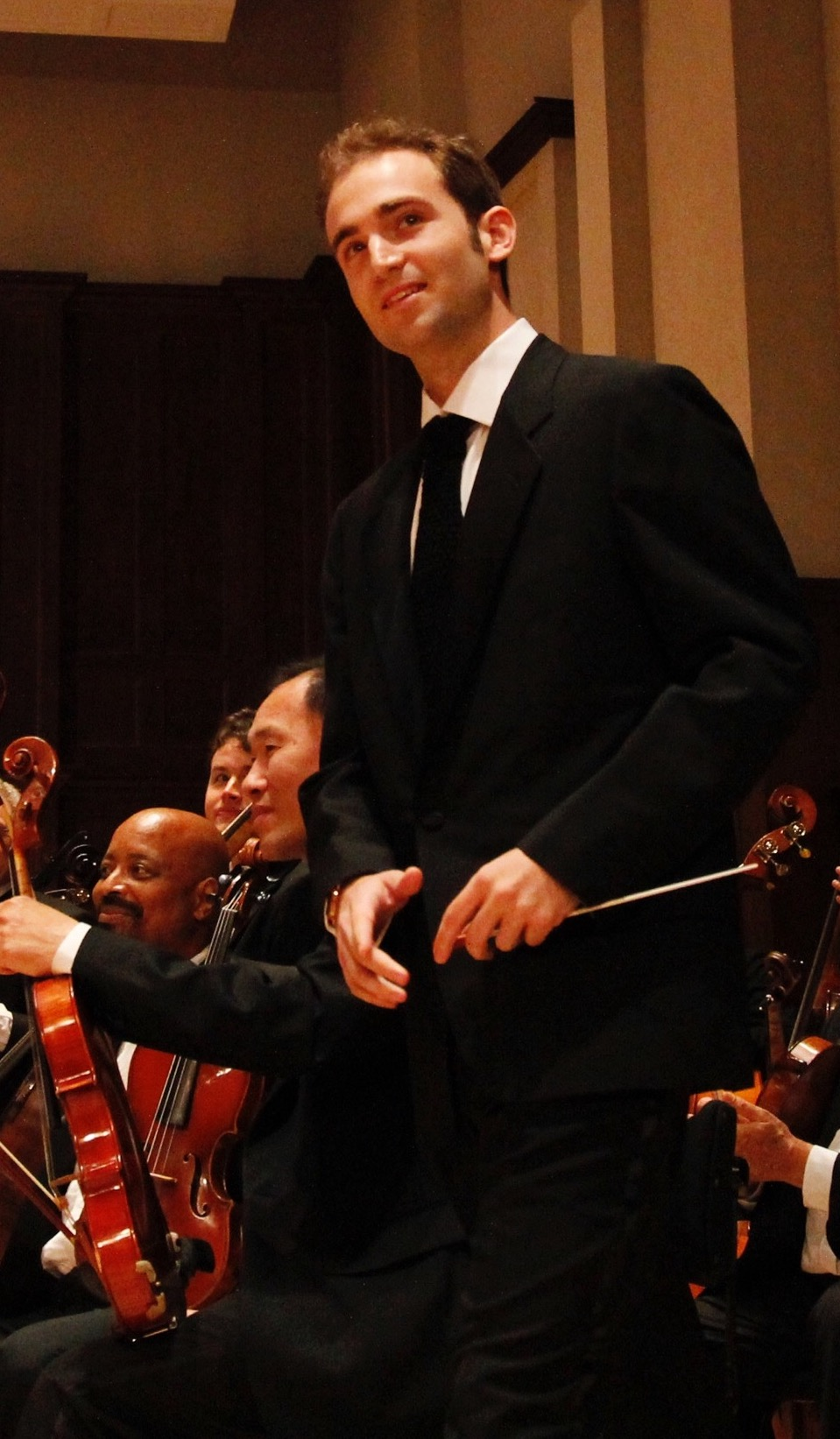
- Daniel Slatkin in 2018.
- Born: Daniel Alexander Slatkin; May 16, 1994 (age 32); St. Louis, Missouri, U.S.
- Education: University of Southern California
- Occupations: Composer; Conductor; Multi-instrumentalist; Music Producer
- Years active: 2016–present
- Musical career
- Genres: Film score; Classical; Electronic
- Website: slatkinmusic.com

Daniel Alexander Slatkin (born May 16, 1994) is an American composer, conductor, multi-instrumentalist and music producer known for his concert works, film scores, and television scores. At the age of 23, Slatkin's feature film debut was premiered at Grauman's Chinese Theatre, and five months later had his symphony orchestra debut with a concert work commissioned by the Detroit Symphony Orchestra.

== Early life and education ==
Daniel Slatkin was born in St. Louis, Missouri, to conductor and 7-time Grammy winner, Leonard Slatkin and Linda Hohenfeld, on May 16, 1994. The Slatkins are part of a Jewish musical family that came from areas of the Russian Empire now in Ukraine. His grandfather, violinist and conductor Felix Slatkin, was the founder of the Hollywood String Quartet and concertmaster of the Twentieth Century Fox Orchestra. His grandmother, Eleanor Aller, was the cellist of the quartet and principal cellist of the Warner Brothers Orchestra, becoming the first female to hold a principal chair in a Hollywood studio orchestra.

Slatkin was educated in the concert hall. He traveled throughout his youth while training classically in piano, watching his father perform on stages all over the world. Slatkin attended Brooks School where he began forming his musical voice, and during this time had his first professional performance as a pianist with the Detroit Symphony Orchestra at the age of 17. After high school, Slatkin attended the University of Southern California, studying business, music and film.

== Career ==
Slatkin has followed in the footsteps of his family, achieving acclaim at an unusually young age. Slatkin conducted his first orchestral commission, In Fields, at age 23 with the Detroit Symphony Orchestra. Additionally, his works have been performed and commissioned by the Los Angeles Philharmonic at the Hollywood Bowl, Manhattan School of Music Symphony Orchestra, Nashville Symphony, Orchestre National de Lyon, National Symphony Orchestra and St. Louis Symphony Orchestra. His recorded music has been broadcast internationally, with his most recent recording, In Fields, having been released in February 2022.

Slatkin's debut feature film, Making Fun: The Story of Funko, was premiered at Grauman's Chinese Theatre, and his film music has since been heard around the world, from Netflix to ESPN to PBS to Amazon Prime to festivals, where his work has been nominated for best score.

In 2022, Slatkin wrote and recorded the score for a feature film with the Detroit Symphony Orchestra in the Max M. Fisher Music Center. The film, about the Detroit bankruptcy, won the Library of Congress Lavine/Ken Burns Prize for Film. That same year, his score for independent feature film Neon Bleed won two Best Score awards, with the selections made by Roger Taylor of Queen and Alan Parsons.

On September 27th, 2024, Slatkin's orchestral work, Voyager 130, received its world premiere with the National Symphony Orchestra in Dublin, Ireland. The work features recorded sounds contained in the Golden Record, aboard NASA's Voyager Spacecraft, and utilizes themes from Beethoven's 13th String Quartet (Op. 130). One month later, Slatkin conducted the St. Louis Symphony Orchestra for the world premiere of Grand Slam Fanfare, in recognition of his father's 80th birthday and their mutual love of baseball. The performance featured a surprise appearance by St. Louis Cardinals Hall of Fame shortstop, Ozzie Smith.

== Concert works ==
- 2018: In Fields
- 2019: Paganini Goes To The Movies
- 2024: Voyager 130
- 2024: Grand Slam Fanfare

== Filmography ==
=== Films ===
Year	Title	Director	Notes
2014	Never to Return	Scott Bergen Espanol	Short film
2016	6:15 on a Saturday Night	Dianna Ippolito	Short film
2017	Nexus	Dianna Ippolito	Short film
2018	Making Fun: The Story of Funko	David Romero	Netflix
2018	Dread Hunt	Nicholas Kramer	Short film
2018	How We Eat	Blair Pennington	Short film
2018	Millennial Romance	Scott Bergen Espanol	Short film
2018	Hollywood Checkmate	Connor Adams	Short film
2019	American Bison	Max McGillivray	Short film
2019	The Last Piece	Will Lowell	Short film
2019	Mommy’s Birthday	Jacob Arbittier	Short film
2020	Dinner Guests	Jacob Arbittier	Short film
2020	Man’s best friend	Pancho Moler	Short film
2020	Melissa	Jacob Arbittier	Short film
2020	Clap Clap	Jacob Arbittier	Short film
2020	Matches	Jordan Nistico	—N/a
2020	Come F*ck My Robot	Mercedes Bryce Morgan	Short film
2020	Chestnut Lane	Jacob Arbittier; Ian Soares	Short film
2020	Zero Time to Waste	Matt Helbig	Short film
2021	Fish	Jacob Arbittier	Short film
2021	PLUM: A Baseball Life	Conor Fitzgerald	—N/a
2022	Slice & Hook	Ray Boland	Short film
2022	Gradually, Then Suddenly: The Bankruptcy of Detroit	Sam Katz; James McGovern	—N/a
2022	Bag Lady	Max McGillivray	Short film
2023	Neon Bleed	John Capone	—N/a
2023	The Chosen One	Elazar Fine	Short film
2023	Choke Hold	Max McGillivray	Short film
2026	Boys To Fame	Sam Katz	—N/a

=== Television ===
Year	Title	Director	Notes
2018	Bread, Salt & The Graphite Kid	David Romero	PBS
2021	The Kitchenistas	David Romero	PBS
2023	SC Featured	Harry Hawkings	Awaken: The Morgan Hoffmann Story
2024	Sunday NFL Countdown	Harry Hawkings	Left Hand Man
2026	In Pursuit: Philadelphia and the Making of America	Sam Katz	WPVI-TV

== Personal life ==
Slatkin resides in Los Angeles with his wife and business partner, Bridget Slatkin.
