= Federico José María Ronstadt =

American musician (1868–1954)

- Born: January 30, 1868; Las Delicias, Sonora, Mexico
- Died: December 13, 1954 (aged 86)
- Occupation: Business
- Known for: Public figure in early 20th century Arizona
- Spouses: Sara Levin; Maria Guadalupe Agustina Dalton
- Children: Luisa Ronstadt Kassler (1892–1963); Laura M Ronstadt Popkin (1895–1975); Frederick A Ronstadt (1897–1947); Alicia R Ronstadt Retes (1901–1986); Alfred F. Ronstadt (1909–1986); Gilbert Ronstadt (1911–1995); Edward F Ronstadt (1916–2001); William E. Ronstadt (1906–1990)
- Relatives: Linda Ronstadt (granddaughter)

Federico José María Ronstadt (January 30, 1868 – December 13, 1954; German: Friedrich Josef Maria Ronstadt) was a Mexican business and cultural leader in Tucson, Arizona, in the early 20th century.

== Life and career ==
Ronstadt was born in Las Delicias, in the municipality of Banamichi, Sonora, Mexico, in 1868, the son of Margarita Redondo y Vásquez and German Friederich August Ronstadt from Hanover. He moved to Tucson in 1882 to learn the blacksmithing and wheelwright trades. He eventually formed the F. Ronstadt wagon and carriage company, which later changed its name to the F. Ronstadt Hardware and Machinery Company and became the largest business of its kind in southern Arizona.

Though he declined many invitations to run for high political offices, Ronstadt was an active community leader. He served a two-year term on the Pima County Board of Supervisors, was chairman of the Water and Agricultural Committee of the Tucson Chamber of Commerce, a member of the Tucson Rotary Club and supported numerous political campaigns and causes.

Music was essential to his life. A guitarist and vocalist, he founded what was probably Tucson's first professional orchestra, the Club Filarmonico Tucsonense, in 1896. In the mid-1920s Ronstadt was among the organizers of the Tucson Symphony Orchestra and he directed a production of Victor Herbert's The Red Mill.

Music and stories always filled Ronstadt's home and inspired his children and grandchildren. He was married twice. His first wife, Sara Levin, was the daughter of Tucson city pioneer Alexander Levin (1834–1891) and Zenone/Zenona Molina. Alexander Levin was born German-Jewish in Bahn, Kingdom of Prussia; he later converted to Catholicism, his wife's religion. Together Federico and Sara had four children: Luisa, Laura, Frederick, and Alicia. After the death of his first wife Sara from typhoid, Ronstadt was married a second time to Maria Guadalupe Agustina Dalton, who was of one-quarter English and three-quarters Mexican ancestry. Federico and Maria had four children together: William, Alfred, Gilbert, and Edward.

His daughter Luisa, known professionally as Luisa Espinel, and granddaughter by Gilbert, Linda Ronstadt, became internationally acclaimed singers. Linda paid tribute to her creative family tradition by recording a Mariachi album, Canciones de Mi Padre (Spanish for "Songs of My Father"), in 1987. Ronstadt remained active in business, writing and music up to his death in 1954. The City of Tucson dedicated its central transit terminal to Ronstadt on March 16, 1991, for his early contribution to the city's mobility which included six mule-drawn streetcars delivered in 1903–1904. Noted historian David Leighton honored the Ronstadt family in January 2020 by naming two streets, Corte de Federico (Federico Court) and Calle de Lupe (Lupe Street) on property that used to be the family's homestead, at Prince Road and Tucson Blvd. The Tucson Musicians Museum is dedicated to the legacy of Ronstadt for his fundamental contributions to Tucson's cultural identity.
