= Grammy Award for Best Classical Performance, Operatic or Choral =

Music award category

- Awarded for: quality classical opera or choral performances
- Country: United States
- Presented by: National Academy of Recording Arts and Sciences
- First award: 1959
- Final award: 1959
- Website: grammy.com

The Grammy Award for Best Classical Performance - Operatic or Choral was awarded in 1959. The equivalent award, Best Classical Performance - Opera Cast or Choral was awarded in 1960. Since 1962 the award has been divided into separate awards for opera and choral performances. See Grammy Award for Best Opera Recording and Grammy Award for Best Choral Performance.

Years reflect the year in which the Grammy Awards were presented, for works released in the previous year.

== Recipients ==
Year	Winner(s)	Title	Nominees	Ref.
1959	Roger Wagner (choir director) & the Roger Wagner Chorale	Virtuoso	Dimitri Mitropoulos – Barber: Vanessa; Erich Leinsdorf – Donizetti: Lucia di Lammermoor; Maria Callas, Tito Gobbi – Rossini: Barber of Seville; Dom David Nicholson - Victoria: Requiem Mass	
1959	Erich Leinsdorf (conductor) & the Vienna Philharmonic Orchestra; Soloists: Lisa Della Casa, Rosalind Elias, George London, Roberta Peters, Giorgio Tozzi	Mozart: The Marriage of Figaro	Erich Leinsdorf conducting the Metropolitan Orchestra and Chorus (solos: Peters, Valetti, Merrill, Tozzi) - Rossini: The Barber of Seville; Fausto Cleva conducting the Metropolitan Opera Orchestra and Chorus (solos: Stevens, Del Monaco) - Saint-Saëns: Samson and Delilah; Richard P. Condie conducting the Mormon Tabernacle Choir - The Beloved Choruses; Fernando Previtali conducting the Accademia de Santa Cecilia, Rome, Orchestra and Chorus (solos: Milanov, Tozzi) - Verdi: La Forza del Destino	
