= Roger Wagner Chorale =

American choir (e. 1946)

- Choir
- Origin: Los Angeles
- Founded: 1946
- Chief conductor: Roger Wagner
- Label: Capitol Records
- Website: Official Site

The Roger Wagner Chorale is an American choir founded by choral musician and educator Roger Wagner in 1946.

== History ==
In 1937, Roger Wagner joined the MGM chorus in Hollywood and was subsequently appointed Music Director of St. Joseph's Church in Los Angeles where he established an outstanding choir of men and boys, including a young Paul Salamunovich. In 1945, Roger Wagner became the supervisor of young choruses for the City of Los Angeles, most notably the Los Angeles Concert Youth Chorus. It was from a madrigal group of twelve of these singers that the Roger Wagner Chorale was born in 1946.

In 1949, the Chorale won a contract with Capitol Records for whom it recorded over 20 records.

Over time, the Chorale became recognized the world over through its numerous radio, concert, and television appearances, motion picture soundtracks (The Gallant Hours), and more than eighty recordings. They were also famous for singing the theme song and "score" for I Married Joan.

The Virtuoso recording won a Grammy Award in 1959, and the popular carol recording Joy to the World was a Gold Record Album, selling more than a half million copies. The Chorale toured all over the world and included such outstanding singers as Marilyn Horne, Marni Nixon, Claudine Carlson, Harve Presnell (on several recordings), Salli Terri (on several recordings as well as researching for several of the LP liner notes), Earl Wrightson, and Carol Neblett.

In 1997, for the 50th anniversary of Radio Korea, the Chorale joined a celebratory concert in Los Angeles.

== Present Day ==
As of 2018, the choir is active and maintains a presence on Facebook
