= Émile Desportes =

French composer and conductor (1878–1944)

Émile Desportes (1878, Pont l'Evêque, France – 1944, Méricourt) was a French composer and conductor. He was the father of composer Yvonne Desportes (1907–93).

Desportes was originally a lawyer at Caen, then professor of music and conductor. He studied composition with Paul Dukas, but soon became more interested in other activities.

Most of his compositions were written for wind instruments, but he also wrote songs, and his best known piece is Pastorale joyeuse for flute and guitar.
