= Hollywood String Quartet =

American string quartet

The Hollywood String Quartet (HSQ) was an American string quartet founded by violinist/conductor Felix Slatkin and his wife cellist Eleanor Aller. The Hollywood String Quartet is considered to be the first American-born and trained classical music chamber group to make an international impact, mainly through its landmark recordings. These recordings have long been regarded as among the most outstanding recorded performances of the string quartet repertoire.

== History ==
The musicians of the Hollywood String Quartet were the leading players in the major movie studio orchestras producing the vibrant, lush film soundtracks during the "Golden Age of Hollywood". In 1939, the same year as their marriage, Felix Slatkin and Eleanor Aller formed the HSQ.

In its original formation, Slatkin and Aller were joined by violist Paul Robyn and second violinist Joachim Chassman. However, the group disbanded soon thereafter when the three male members enlisted in WWII service. The HSQ resumed its activities in 1947, with Paul Shure replacing Chassman as second violinist. In 1955, Paul Robyn left the group and Alvin Dinkin assumed the viola chair.

In addition to their work in the Hollywood studio orchestras and recording classical repertoire, the HSQ members regularly performed as session musicians at the major record companies, including Capitol Records. At Capitol, they accompanied some of the leading pop performers of the era, most notably Frank Sinatra, for whom Felix Slatkin acted as concertmaster and occasional conductor on his now iconic Capitol recordings during the 1950s. Among these recordings was the 1956 Close to You, which featured the HSQ accompanying Sinatra in arrangements by Nelson Riddle.

The HSQ officially disbanded in 1961. Slatkin died two years later at the age of 47.

== The musicians ==
The musicians of the HSQ were all the progeny of Russian immigrants. All excelled musically in their youth and were formally trained at either the Juilliard School or the Curtis Institute of Music. The musicians were:

Felix Slatkin (1915–1963) Violin; Studied at Curtis with renowned violinist Efrem Zimbalist and conducting with Fritz Reiner; at age 15 was a member of the St. Louis Symphony under conductor Vladimir Golschmann; Concert Master of the 20th Century Fox Studio Orchestra (1937–1963) and the Capitol Records Sinatra recording sessions; conductor of the Concert Arts Orchestra and Hollywood Bowl Symphony Orchestra.

Eleanor Aller Slatkin (1917–1995) Cello; Studied at Juilliard with Felix Salmond; First cello with the Warner Bros. Studio Orchestra from 1939-1968 and with the 20th Century Fox Orchestra from 1972-1985.

Paul Shure (1921–2011) Second Violin; Studied at Curtis with Joseph Achron; youngest player in the Philadelphia Orchestra at age 18 under conductor Leopold Stokowski; Assistant Concertmaster at 20th Century Fox; left the HSQ in 1958 and shortly thereafter assumed a faculty position at the Oberlin Conservatory of Music; concertmaster of the Los Angeles Chamber Orchestra from 1972-1987 as well as other major west coast ensembles. After Shure's departure from the HSQ, Joseph Stepansky joined the Quartet for concert tours.

Paul Robyn (1908–1970) Viola; Studied at Juilliard with Joseph Fuchs, Samuel Gardner and Hans Letz; Violist with the Gordon String Quartet (1931–1935); Principal Violist at Warner Brothers; Left the HSQ in 1955; replaced by Alvin Dinkin.

Alvin Dinkin (1912–1970) Viola; Studied at Curtis with Louis Bailly; played in St. Louis Symphony and 20th Century Fox Orchestras with Felix Slatkin.

In addition, pianist Victor Aller (1905–1977) was featured on several HSQ recordings, including the acclaimed Brahms Piano Quartets and Piano Quintet. Aller, the brother of cellist Eleanor, studied at Juilliard under Josef Lhévinne. He had a long and distinguished career as a pianist in the film industry and manager of the Warner Bros. Studio Orchestra, and as a teacher and recording artist.

== The HSQ sound ==
The Slatkins' elder son, conductor Leonard Slatkin, has observed that the similarities among musicians' backgrounds and music training impacts their technique and resulting sound as an ensemble: "With the Hollywood String Quartet, you had four people who basically had the same kind of training; four people who were more or less of the same age group and who approached music in almost identical ways."

The resulting sound has been noted for its "remarkable transparency of texture ... this clarity was due in part to their excellent intonation and partly through their thorough preparation ... what set them above ... was their ability to combine warmth, color, and intensity with intellectual rigor, firm rhythm and an intuitive grasp of a work's architecture." Music critic and historian Alfred Frankenstein wrote after attending an HSQ concert: "This is a quartet to rank with the great international organizations in the field ... it has magnificent collective tone, a superb style that overlooks no fine detail but also sweeps through the major lines of a big work with almost symphonic vigor, and a general concept of music-making that is in tradition of the ensemble."

Five years later, a New York Times concert review echoed Frankenstein's comments: the HSQ produced a "luminous tone, whether in pianissimo or fortissimo ... at its best as in the Schubert work, which was played with incredible tonal nuance and expert musicianship, the Hollywood Quartet would have to be listed among the world's great chamber music ensembles."

Violinist Paul Shure has noted, "we made room for each other technically and soloistically-but the blend of sound was the main thing ... you draw the sound by your ability; the kind of vibrato you use, the way you apply pressure to the bow ... these are all very subtle techniques in string playing." Shure has also stated: "Dynamics were a very big part of our work. Our discussions were always about dynamics and a little bit about tempi, and nothing else. We played with vibrato except where there was a particular effect to be had-no dead left hands were allowed."

Cellist Eleanor Aller also commented: "Nothing was done without thought ... it was dependent on who the composer was, and the musical content ... just to play the notes is not making music." Aller has also stated that the group practiced every day for two years before its first public concert debut.

== The classical recordings ==
From 1949–1958, the HSQ recorded a series of classical albums for Capitol Records; some of these recordings were re-released in boxed LP sets by EMI in the 1980s and in CD format by Testament Records during the 1990s. From their first recording of the then relatively unknown Villa Lobos String Quartet No. 6 to their Grammy-winning recordings of the Beethoven Late Quartets, the HSQ discography set a standard of excellence heralded by critics and embraced by the public. As stated by critic Richard Freed in discussing a 1982 EMI compilation release, "The Hollywood String Quartet may have been the finest such ensemble ever formed in this country ... each of these performances could serve as a sort of norm for the interpretation of the respective work. Both individual and ensemble playing are on the highest level, and the balance between subtlety and passion is quite remarkable; the Schubert in particular is a gem. EMI has done a beautiful job of remastering the recordings, which were state of the art for their time."

The recordings garnered similar enthusiasm upon their initial release. Commenting on record of compositions by Creston, Turina, and Wolf, Gramophone Magazine's Lionel Salter wrote: "Once again the Hollywood Quartet shows what a masterly ensemble it is; I for one always look forward to its new records and have never yet been faced with a performance of less than the highest class. The tone of all the members is warm and well-balanced, they play with unshakable unaniminity [sic] and suppleness."

A complete classical discography is located at the end of this article. The discography includes a sampling of critical assessments. With the exception of the first record, the original recordings were produced by either Richard C. Jones or Robert E. Myers with engineering by John Palladino, Sherwood Hall III, Hugh Davies, or Carson Taylor (as noted). The CD reissues, released between 1993–1997, were remastered by Paul Bally at the Abbey Road Studios; Stewart Brown, Executive Producer.

== The HSQ and modern repertoire ==
The HSQ repertoire included several contemporary compositions, including pieces that had not previously been recorded. Prior to the HSQ's 1950 recording, Arnold Schoenberg's Verklärte Nacht had only been released in a version for orchestra, although it was originally written for six instruments. Joined by Alvin Dinkin on second viola and Kurt Reher on second cello, the HSQ recording of the sextet in its original form was heralded by the composer, who wrote the original liner notes for the LP jacket. In a taped interview years later, cellist Eleanor Aller was visibly moved as she recalled receiving a photo inscribed by Schoenberg: "For the Hollywood String Quartet for playing my Verklärte Nacht with such subtle beauty."

In 1994, Gramophone Magazine inducted the CD re-issue of Verklärte Nacht, coupled with the Schubert String Quintet in C major into its Hall of Fame in the Historical Non-Vocal category. Gramophone Magazine stated that the recording was "unsurpassed...they have incomparable ensemble and blend; and their impeccable technical address and consummate tonal refinement silence criticism." Writing about a 1952 concert performance in San Francisco which he described as "epical", music historian Alfred Frankenstein said: "Perhaps the Schoenberg was the most important of the three pieces ... for it has seldom been presented here in its original form, as a chamber work for six musicians. In this version, it possesses a magical transparency and beauty of texture which are lost in the more familiar version for string orchestra, and none of its coloristic or expressive marvels was slighted in Sunday's performance."

The HSQ was the first to record the String Quartet in A Minor by Sir William Walton. At that time, the first recording of a work had to receive the composer's approval prior to release. In the first (unreleased) version recorded in November, 1949, the HSQ eliminated the repeat in the second movement; the musicians felt it detracted from the excitement of the composition. However, Walton did not concur with the change, resulting in a re-recording of the movement in August, 1950. The released version received the composer's enthusiastic endorsement: "I hope no one else ever records my Quartet again, because you captured so exactly what I had wanted". Walton's music publisher from Oxford University Press also wrote to violist Paul Robyn: "I felt I would like to add ... how much Dr. Walton and I enjoyed your playing of the very prominent viola part of this work. Would there not be a chance one day that you could play his Viola Concerto...?" However, Robyn never recorded Walton's Viola Concerto.

Similarly, composer Paul Creston responded to their 1953 recording of his String Quartet by writing to the album's producer Robert Myers: "I am tremendously pleased with the performance and reproduction of the work ... would you be so kind as to convey my deepest appreciation and gratitude to the Hollywood String Quartet for their splendid execution. Reports of their fine abilities had already reached me before I was fortunate enough to become acquainted with them, and I am delighted that they were chosen to permanently preserve my composition."

== Close to You; recording with Sinatra ==
Another highlight of the HSQ's recording legacy is the 1956 Frank Sinatra album Close to You produced by Voyle Gilmore; a series of popular songs arranged by Nelson Riddle in an impressionistic blend of popular, classical and jazz influences. Close to You was a unique project, a scaled-down approach to popular music which remains among Sinatra's most enduring albums. The project was in part the product of Frank Sinatra's close professional and personal friendship with Felix and Eleanor Slatkin.

In Sessions with Sinatra; Frank Sinatra and the Art of Recording, Sinatra historian Chuck Granata observes "In Slatkin, Sinatra found a kindred spirit, as the violinist's immaculate playing paralleled what Sinatra sought to achieve with his voice; serious listeners will note many similarities comparing Sinatra's and Slatkin's individual approaches to musical interpretation. One hallmark of the HSQ was its long, smooth phrasing which was accomplished through controlled bowing techniques; Sinatra utilized breath control to realize the same effect. Likewise where Felix would frequently add slight upward portamento to a critical note and neatly strike an emotional chord, the singer would often inflect a note upward or downward or seamlessly glide from one key to another."

Granata observes that the concept behind Close to You was "...extremely progressive by the standard of its day." He further concludes that "from a thematic standpoint, of all the Sinatra LPs of his 'golden era,' Close to You comes closest to perfection."

== Touring ==
The HSQ toured in the United States seven times, and visited Canada and New Zealand, but due to the musicians' extensive studio commitments, concerts were primarily performed in Southern California. However, the HSQ was the first American quartet to be invited to the Edinburgh Festival during a 1957 tour that also included appearances in Stockholm, Rome and the Royal Festival Hall in London. A live recording of selections from the Royal Festival Hall performance was issued on CD form in 1996.

== Honors and awards ==
The nascent National Academy of Recording Arts and Sciences (NARAS) initiated the Grammy Awards in 1958, toward the end of the HSQ's recording career. At the first Grammy ceremony, the HSQ recording of the Beethoven String Quartet No. 13 was awarded the Grammy for Best Classical Performance, Chamber Music (including Chamber Orchestra). Felix Slatkin was also a Trustee of the Los Angeles Chapter of NARAS.

In 1994, the Hollywood String Quartet won the prestigious Gramophone Magazine Award in the Historic Non-Vocal category for the Testament Records compact disc of Schoenberg’s Verklärte Nacht and Schubert’s Quintet in C Major.

In 1997, the Cannes Classical Award voted by an international panel of record reviewers honored the recording of the Late Beethoven Quartets and honored the Hollywood String Quartet with its Lifetime Achievement Award, accepted by Paul Shure, at the time the last surviving HSQ member.

== Personal legacy ==
Eleanor and Felix Slatkin's two sons enjoy significant careers in music. Leonard Slatkin is a distinguished conductor and is music director of the Detroit Symphony and the Orchestre National de Lyon. Frederick Zlotkin (who adopted the original family surname) is the first cello of the New York City Ballet Orchestra and a member of the Lyric Piano Quintet.

The HSQ has no connection with the group which calls itself the New Hollywood String Quartet.

== Discography ==
| Year Recorded | Repertoire | Notes |
|---|---|---|
| 1949 | Villa-Lobos String Quartet No. 6 in E (1938): Recorded: October 17, 1949; LP: Capitol L-8054 CD: Testament SBT 1053 (1994); Producer: Jim Conkling; Engineer: John Palladino | 1951 Gramophone Magazine: "...the playing is really brilliant, and the recording on this side very satisfactory...I heartily recommend it to those with a taste for the unfamiliar repertoire...there are many delightful things in this score—the 7/8 cello cantabile against pizzicato figures which starts the second movement, or the deliciously fresh...finale, but to my mind the loveliest part is the Andante, which opens with sentimental chromatic chords sliding down under an ostinato figure in harmonies—a fascinating sound. We should welcome this attractive work—as yet unperformed here—into the repertoire." |
| 1949 & 1950 | Walton String Quartet in A Minor (1947): Recorded: November 2 & 3 1949 & August 22, 1950; LP: Capitol P-8054 CD: Testament SBT 1052 (1994); Producer: Richard C. Jones, Jim Conkling; Engineer: John Palladino | 1982 Commentary Magazine: "It was immediately apparent from this record that the ensemble possessed both personality and a sense of style. The playing was at once suave and brilliant, and the vastly different characteristics of the two composers- Villa-Lobos dark hued and soulful, Walton linear and reserved...were clearly limned." 1951 Gramophone Magazine: "The Hollywood team...gives a polished and thoroughly vital reading, full of verve and sympathetic expression; the recording however is too dry in tone quality, giving a somewhat dead effect to the second subject of the opening movement..." |
| 1950 | Schoenberg Verklärte Nacht, Op. 4: Recorded: August 21 & 22, 1950; LP: Capitol P-8304 CD: Testament: SBT 1031 (1993); Producer: Richard C. Jones; Engineer: John Palladino | Additional Musicians: Alvin Dinkin, second viola and Kurt Reher, second cello. This is the first recording of this work in its original version. The album jacket states: "This recording was prepared under the personal supervision of the composer." The Testament Records compact disc re-issue was honored with the prestigious 1994 Gramophone Award in the Historic Non-Vocal category. 1951 Gramophone Magazine: "The work is beautifully played here, with the most careful attention to details of dynamics and phrasing, with unfailing finesse, with consistently sympathetic tone, and most important, with a firm sense of the basic structure. The recording is satisfactory, though the acoustical effect is that of sitting rather far away in a good by large hall. I would have preferred a little sharper definition and a more intimate quality but this is a preference, not a grumble." |
| 1951 | Schubert String Quintet in C, Op. 163, D 956: Recorded: January 15–17, 1951; LP: Capitol P-8133 EMI RLS-765 CD: Testament SBT 1031 (1993); Producer: Richard C. Jones; Engineer: John Palladino | Additional Musician; Kurt Reher, second cello. The Testament Records compact disc re-issue was honored with the prestigious 1994 Gramophone Award in the Historic Non-Vocal category. 1994 Gramophone Magazine: "In terms of natural eloquence and selflessness of utterance; it fully deserves its classic status. The tranquillity of the slow movement has never been conveyed with greater nobility or more perfect control...as older collectors will know, this is altogether exceptional music making." |
| 1951 | Hindemith String Quartet No. 3 in C, Op. 22: Recorded: April 2–3, 1951; LP: Capitol P-8151 CD: Testament SBT 1052 (1994); Producer; Richard C. Jones; Engineer: John Palladino | 1982 Commentary Magazine: "To Paul Hindemith's Third Quartet the Hollywood brought every necessary virture of polyphonic clarity without ever losing the ability to play each melodic line as if it had been written for a beautiful human voice." 1995 Gramophone Magazine: What a wonderful feeling for line these players had, what an incredible, perfectly matched and blended ensemble they produced-and how well these transfers sound!" |
| 1951 | Prokofiev String Quartet No. 2 in F, Op. 92: Recorded: April 4–5, 1951; LP: Capitol P-8151 CD: Testament SBT 1052 (1994); Producer: Richard C. Jones; Engineer: John Palladino | 1982 Commentary Magazine: "If the group's performance...of the Prokofiev Second Quartet seemed both softened in outline and somewhat lacking in drive, the fault perhaps lay as much with the work's essential aridity as with the players' execution." 1952 Gramophone Magazine: "As in most Soviet compositions, there is little in the music to hinder an immediate understanding, but Prokofiev has managed to retain at least some of his personality. The first movement is the best integrated and the most successful; the last, more episodic in construction, tends to desintegrate [sic?], and not even the spirited and sympathetic performance of the Hollywood Quartet can make it altogether convincing. But the general impression the work leaves if of good humour and bucolic charm." 1995 Gramophone Magazine: "Although numerous LP and CD accounts of the Prokofiev have appeared in the intervening years, none has approached, let alone surpassed, the Hollywood version of the Second Quartet. The same would apply to the Hindemith but...there have been fewer challengers." |
| 1951 | Ravel Introduction et Allegro pour harp, flute, clarinet et cordes: Recorded: October 29, 1951; LP: Capitol L-8154, P-8304, CD: Testament SBT 1053 (1994); Producer: Richard C. Jones; Engineer John Palladino | Additional Musicians: Ann Mason Stockton, harp; Arthur Gleghorn, flute; Mitchell Laurie, clarinet. 1952 Gramophone Magazine: "I don't hope ever to hear a more wonderful performance of either of these pieces than Ann Mason Stockton and her collaborators have here put on permanent record. The Ravel must...be a harpist's dream solo; it exploits every facet of style and colour at the instrument's disposal, and the luscious sound of the flute, clarinet and string quartet blend most effectively with the solo part without ever obscuring it. For sheer beauty of sound there are few things in music equal to this; and none, surely to surpass it when it gets a performance of this calibre." |
| 1952 | Debussy Danses Sacree et Profane: Recorded: October 30, 1951; LP: Capitol L-8154, P-8304, CD: Testament: 1053 (!994); Producer: Richard C. Jones; Engineer: John Palladino | Additional Musicians: Ann Mason Stockton, harp; the Concert Arts String Ensemble conducted by Felix Slatkin. 1952 Gramophone Magazine: The Debussy dances make a perfect backing...Here again the performance defies criticism; even the noises off of harp playing, at their worst in struggling with music written primarily for the chromatic and not for the double-action harp, have been reduced to extinction in all but one small place...the recording of the Ravel is perhaps a little too resonant; and in the Debussy I would have liked the two dances played, as the composer intended, without a break. But these mild offences-if you hold them to be so at all-pale into utter insignificance beside the beauty of the music and the performance in this red letter issue.." |
| 1952 | Brahms String Quartet No. 2 in A Minor, Op. 51 No. 2: Recorded: January 28–30, 1952; LP: Capitol P-8163 CD: Testament SBT 3063; Producer: Richard C. Jones; Engineer: John Palladino | 1952 Gramophone Magazine: "This Capitol recording ... has remarkable depth and sonority and is very life-like. The first movement ... with its typical arching arpeggio main theme contains ... one of Brahms' most lovely tunes (it is a pity that the leader makes his rilardando too late in introducing this tune). The fine quality of this recording shows almost everywhere in the perfect clarity of the parts, and I particularly noticed how well the dark tone of the viola, melodically here above the second violin, told on the repetition of this tune, although the lusingando accompaniment on the first violin is somewhat obscured...there is plenty of emotional feeling in the slow movement...and the requisite grace in the third movement." |
| 1952 | Shostakovich Piano Quintet in G minor, Op. 57: Recorded: May 6, 1952; LP: Capitol P-8171 CD: Testament: SBT 1077 (1995); Producer: Robert E. Myers; Engineer: John Palladino | Featuring Victor Aller, piano; 1996 Gramophone Magazine: "Their string tone though often extremely delicate is never skinny...both versions (the Franck and Shostakovich) are towering and remain among the very best even now, 40 years on..." |
| 1952 | Tchaikovsky String Quartet No. 1 in D, Op. 11: Recorded: November 10, 12 & December 22, 1952; LP: Capitol P-8187 Testament SBT 1061 (1995); Producer: Robert E. Myers; Engineer: John Palladino | Gramophone Magazine 1953: "Here the efficiency of the Hollywood Quartet becomes positively galvanic-there is a fine fire about the performance as a whole though still perhaps not quite enough poetry in the Andante cantabile-another famous extract. When the strings mute for this movement, they do indeed make an agreeable noise; their resumption of the naked state in the next movement coincides with...what must sure a slightly inferior tape to emphasize the unfortunately more normal acid tone quality." |
| 1952 | Borodin String Quartet No. 2 in D: Recorded: December 19–20, 1952; LP: Capitol P-8187 CD: Testament: SBT 1061 (1995); Producer: Robert E. Myers; Engineer: John Palladino | Gramophone Magazine 1953: "The Borodin is an agreeable work, with a famous Nocturne for the slow movement...the Hollywood Quartet play it in an efficient style, that nearly extends to being romantic enough for the occasion but somehow has an occasional habit of substituting a rather exaggerated glissando for a true poetry of expression. The fault is not indulged into excess; indeed whether it exists at all is a matter of opinion." Gramophone Magazine 1956 comparing three different recordings: "But the Hollywood Quartet are altogether more proficient in the finale; in technique, ensemble and musicianship they leave their rivals well behind." |
| 1953 | Franck Piano Quintet in F minor: Recorded: January 27–29, 1953; LP: Capitol P-8220 CD: Testament: SBT 1077 (1996); Producer: Robert E. Myers; Engineer: John Palladino | Featuring Victor Aller, piano; 1954 Gramophone Magazine: "This is super sensitive playing in which every nuance of phrasing is taken into account. The difficulty of recording the work is that it can only too easily sound like a thwarted piano concerto but by the exercise of great care there is never any suggestion of unbalance and the piano tone is round and full-climaxed...without swamping the strings...partly we should thank Mr. Aller, whose flawless playing is always clear, even in Franck's splashiest writing but some of the credit is obviously due to the recording engineers, who have done a first class job..." |
| 1953 | Turina La oración del torero, Op. 34 (1925): Recorded: December 14, 1953; LP: P-8260 CD: 1053 (1994); Producer: Robert E. Myers; Engineer: John Palladino | 1954 Gramophone Magazine: "With their flexibility but overall shaping, they make Turina's rhapsodic genre piece sound a better work that in really is; it would be difficult to better this performance." |
| 1953 | Creston String Quartet. Op. 8 (1935): Recorded: December 21 & 26, 1953; LP: P-8260, CD: Testament SBT 1053; Producer: Robert E. Myers; Engineer: John Palladino | Gramophone Magazine 1954: "It is interesting to hear a new voice, especially when it has some individuality; and Mr. Creston's Quartet is mercifully content to make music, which, if of no particular profundity, is civilised and free from prickly dogmas. The work consists of a busy Allegro, a scherzo of predominately mysterious mood (an attractive movement, this), a somewhat over-long Andante ecclesiastico...and a lively fugue. In the first movement the recording is slightly cloudy, but the veil later lifts to enable us to enjoy the work without interference." |
| 1953 | Wolf Italian Serenade: Recorded December 26, 1953; LP: Capitol P-8260 CD: Testament SBT 1077; Producer: Robert E. Myers; Engineer: John Palladino | Gramophone Magazine 1954: "Wolf's Italian Serenade...captivates the listener right away by the buoyant, springy rhythm with the Quartet brings to it. The pace is perhaps on the fast side...and the recording here is rather dry, but this performance satisfactorily fills an inexplicable gap in the catalog." |
| 1954 | Brahms Piano Quintet in F minor, Op. 34: Recorded: March 30 & 31, 1954; LP: Capitol P-8269 EMI RLS-765 CD: Testament: 3063; Producer: Robert E. Myers; Engineer: Sherwood Hall III | Featuring Victor Aller, piano 1982; Gramophone Magazine: I have also long admired their account with Victor Aller of the Brahms F Minor Quintet...it is a powerful and thoughtful performance, and holds its own against such distinguished rivals as the Serkin with the Busch Quartet...and the 1969 Eschenbach Amadeus...it certainly has more concentration and poetry than the...version by Pollini..." |
| 1955 | Dohnanyi String Quartet No. 3 in A minor, Op. 3: Recorded: January 8 & 9, 1955; LP: Capitol P-8307 CD: Testament: SBT 1081; Producer: Robert E. Myers; Engineer: Sherwood Hall III | Alvin Dinkin assumed the viola chair for this and all subsequent recordings. Paul Robyn played first viola on all previous recordings. The composer wrote to producer Myers: "with thanks for the beautiful record of my music." 1955 Gramophone Magazine: "I do not remember to have heard it before...has much rich and lovely sound in it but not much meaning. It must be fun to play, so skillfully does the composer write for the strings, and it is played here for all it is worth, and more. The middle movement, a rather beautiful solemn tune with variations, one a brilliant scherzo, is the most interesting, and none of the work is dull. The playing, as I have suggested, is magnificent and the recording quality equally so." |
| 1955 | Dvorak String Quartet No. 6 in F, Op. 96, "American": Recorded: January 23 & 34, 1955; LP: P-8307 EMI: RLS-765 CD: Testament 1072; Producer: Robert E. Myers; Engineer: Sherwood Hall III | 1996 Gramophone Magazine: "As always, the Hollywood ensemble is perfect; they have finesse, superb blend and attack and flawless intonation, all of which are heard to splended effect in the Smetana and Dvorak." |
| 1955 | Hummel String Quartet in G, Op. 30 No. 2: Recorded: April 22 & 23, 1955; LP: Capitol P-8316, CD: Testament SBT 1085 (1996); Producer: Robert E. Myers; Engineer: Sherwood Hall III | 1957 Gramophone Magazine: "if I bought this record it would be for the charming Hummel quartet on the other side. This is considerably better recorded, and although the first movement is taken at a pace which makes it sound rather streamlined and ungenial the Hollywood players seem in general more at home in it-perhaps because it is a much less romantic piece than the Schumann." |
| 1955 | Schumann Piano Quintet in E-Flat, Op. 44: Recorded May 13, 14 & 16, 1955; LP: Capitol P-8316 CD: Testament: 3063; Producer: Robert E. Myers; Engineer: Sherwood Hall III | Featuring Victor Aller, piano 1957 Gramophone Magazine: In the Schumann Quintet the recorded sound is a little steely-and steely is a word that could be used of the playing, in the first and third movements at least. This is a very fine performance, but in the last resort I found it less sympathetic than that of the Rubinstein and the Paganini Quartet, for all that it is technically more perfect. But the Schumann Quintet is not a favorite work of mine..." |
| 1955 | Smetana String Quartet No. 1 in E, T116, "From My Life": Recorded: November 2, 1955; LP: Capitol P-8331 EMI RLS-765 (1982) CD: Testament 1072 (1996); Producer: Robert E. Myers; Engineer: Sherwood Hall III | 1982 Gramophone Magazine: "Both these performances (Dvorak and Smetana) were new to me and both strike me as hardly less superb than their companions (the reviewer is referring to the 1982 compilation with the Brahms Piano Quintet in F Minor and the Schubert Quintet in C Major). The style of these artists has dated much less than many other ensembles; they possess splendid attack and finesse, superb blend and flawless intonation, though there is at times an unrelieved intensity and glare in the leader's tone. The sound is remarkably good for its period with plenty of presence and body, though the acoustic is on the small side." 1956 Saturday Review: "The Smetana is done with love and understanding and also the technical equipment required to do the writing justice." |
| 1955 | Glazunov Five Novelettes: Recorded: November 26 & 27, 1955; LP: Capitol P-8331 CD: Testament: 1061; Producer: Robert E. Myers; Engineer: Sherwood Hall III | 1956 Saturday Review: "Two of the best performances [referring to the Smetana and the Glazunov] this group has put on records and a top contemporary standard in each instance...the excellently turned performances of the engaging Glazunov pieces give them exactly what is wanted in accent and phrasing while not overburdening them with 'seriousness'. Very well balanced sound throughout." |
| 1956 | Brahms Piano Quartet No. 3 in C minor, Op. 60: Recorded: January 6–8, 1956; LP: Capitol P-8377 Boxed set: PER 8346 CD: Testament 3063; Producer: Robert E. Myers; Engineer: Sherwood Hall III | Featuring Victor Aller, piano; 1958 Gramophone Magazine: "No one could describe their technique as not very competent, though their interpretative powers may be open to question. Victor Aller is much too unctious about the second subject of the opening movement...the players...spoil the scherzo by slowing down each time for the contrasted subject; this breaks the flow of the music...in the slow movement the Hollywood cellist plays his (Brahms) big tune most beautifully and Aller and the Hollywood players have more drive and precision in the finale...." |
| 1956 | Brahms Piano Quartet No. 1 in G minor, Op. 25: Recorded May 2, 3 & 26, 1956; LP: Capitol P-8378 Boxed set: PER 8346 CD: Testament SBT 3063; Producer Robert E. Myers; Engineer: Sherwood Hall III | Featuring Victor Aller, piano; 1957 Gramophone Magazine: "I must confess that this G minor has always seemed to me some way below the level of the A major and C minor...until I heard this record. I now feel I have been underrating it. The players seem right inside the music and they convey its true worth to the full. Occasionally the violinist scoops up to his high notes...and occasionally the cellist seems over-reticent. But both are fine players and the violist is superb. The pianist too covers himself with glory; at times I wondered if he had been a little too favored as regards the balance, but on the whole the four players are splendidly recorded. I remember especially the almost Berlioz-like trio in the intermezzo and the wonderful march theme that interrupts the slow movement; both are splendidly played..." |
| 1956 | Brahms Piano Quartet No. 2 in A, Op. 26: Recorded: June 6 & 7, 20, 1956; LP: P-8376* Boxed set: PER 8346 CD: Testament SBT 3063; Producer: Robert E. Myers; Engineer: Sherwood Hall III | Featuring Victor Aller, piano; 1996 Gramophone Magazine: "Although opinion was not wholly undivided, the Hollywood recordings soon became the yardstick by which newcomers were measured and from the vantage point of 1995, they still are! There are few sets of the piano quartets that are so completely satisfying, though there are many that also offer revealing musical insights." |
| 1956 | Schubert String Quartet No. 14 in D minor, D 810, "Death and the Maiden": Recorded: December 7 & 9, 1956; LP: Capitol P-8359 CD: Testament: 1081; Producer: Robert E. Myers; Engineer: Sherwood Hall III | 1983 Commentary Magazine: "Here the performing miracle resides in the perfection of the playing, consisting in secure intonation and rhythmic precision. Comparison with the recording performances of two historically great quartets...places the Hollywood, for all the musical virtures of the others, in a class by itself." 1960 Gramophone Magazine: "...the Hollywood (still the unbeaten criterion for Death and the Maiden performances)..." |
| 1957 | Beethoven String Quartet in No. 10 in E flat, Op. 127: Recorded: February 22 & 23, March 2 & 9, 1957; LP: Capitol P-8443 Box Set:PER 8394 CD: Testament 3082 (1996); Producer: Richard C. Jones; Engineers: Hugh Davies & Sherwood Hall III | Also released in the box set, Beethoven-The Late Quartets as Played at the Edinburgh International Festival in 1957; New York Times 1957: The music is of course any string quartet's alpha and omega. In length, technical and musical difficulty, and expressiveness, the quartets pose superhuman problems...this is precise, strong playing with remarkable technical gloss. In matters of pitch, ensemble and instrumental finesse, the Hollywood players need defer to no living organization." |
| | Beethoven String Quartet No. 13 in B flat, Op. 130: Recorded: March 23 & 31 and April 6 & 20, 1957; LP: Capitol P-8429 Box Set:PER 8394 CD: Testament 3082 (1996); Producer: Robert E. Myers; Engineers: Hugh Davies & Sherwood Hall III | Awarded the Grammy for Best Classical Performance, Chamber Music (including Chamber Orchestra) at the first Grammy Awards ceremony. Also released in the box set, Beethoven-The Late Quartets as Played at the Edinburgh International Festival in 1957; 1983 Stereo Review: The sound is astoundingly rich and vivid for its time; one would hardly suspect the recordings' age or notice that they are not stereophonic...the splendid sound quality does enhance their appeal. That appeal is considerable, based equally on profundity, vigor and brilliance. For sheer articulation of the notes, the playing at times approaches the miraculous, and the more demanding Beethoven's music becomes, both spiritually and technically, the more splendidly the HSQ rises to meet its demands." |
| 1957 | Beethoven String Quartet No. 16 in F major, Op. 135: Recorded: April 22, May 11, and June 1, 3 & 12; LP: Capitol P-8455 Box Set:PER 8394 CD: Testament 3082 (1996); Producer: Robert E. Myers; Engineers: Hugh Davies & Sherwood Hall III | Also released in the box set, Beethoven-The Late Quartets as Played at the Edinburgh International Festival in 1957; 1997 Gramophone Magazine: These celebrated recordings by the Hollywood Quartet first appeared in 1958 and...their appearance on CD is the cause for rejoicing and celebration...the playing is consistently selfless and always immaculate...they are authoritative performances of real stature whose praises have been sung often and loudly- and more to the point, rightly." |
| 1957 | Beethoven Grosse Fuge in B flat, Op. 133 ': Recorded: May 13 & 18, 1957; LP: Capitol P-8455 Box Set:PER 8394 CD: Testament 3082 (1996); Producer: Robert E. Myers; Engineers: Hugh Davies & Sherwood Hall III | Also released in the box set, Beethoven-The Late Quartets as Played at the Edinburgh International Festival in 1957; 1997 Gramophone Magazine: ...the Grosse Fuge is altogether 'stunning,' the breathtaking virtuosity this ensemble commanded always placed at the service of musical ends." |
| 1957 | Beethoven String Quartet No. 15 in A minor, Op. 132: Recorded: May 25 & June 8 & 12, 1957; LP: P-8424 Box Set: PER 8394 CD: Testament 3082 (1996): Producer: Robert E. Myers; Engineers: Hugh Davies & Sherwood Hall III | Also released in the box set, Beethoven-The Late Quartets as Played at the Edinburgh International Festival in 1957; 1983 Stereo Review: The HSQ's recordings of Op. 132 and the Grosse Fugue exhibit a spiritual power and dramatic tension rarely matched in other recordings of these works, and that of Op. 131 is not far behind.". |
| 1957 | Beethoven String Quartet in C sharp minor, Op. 131: Recorded: June 15, 22 and 29, 1957; LP: P-8425 Box Set:PER 8394 CD: Testament 3082 (1996); Producer: Robert E. Myers; Engineers: Hugh Davies & Sherwood Hall III | Also released in the box set, Beethoven-The Late Quartets as Played at the Edinburgh International Festival in 1957; New York Herald Tribune Review of Books 1957: "The great C sharp minor Quartet Op. 131 is a brilliant achievement. The Hollywood Quartet has a distinctive collective tone, bright and clean without being edgy. It seems to shed light on the mysteries of Op. 131 and most of these other quartets...the Hollywood sheds an illuminating brightness over this music." |
| 1957 | Haydn Mozart-The Unpublished Live Recordings: Recorded: September 8, 1957; LP: none CD: Testament SBT 1085 (1996); Original producer: unknown | 1996 Gramophone Magazine: "The Haydn has the same unity of style that we find in their studio recordings, though it may not be as technically immaculate...on hearing the tapes Eleanor Aller, who had originally been opposed to issuing it, is quoted as saying,'I didn't realize how wonderfully we played and the sound is astonishingly good.' She is absolutely right. There is not a trace of self-awareness and the dedication and absorption in the music-making is total. She is right about the sound, too..."." |
| 1958 | Kodaly String Quartet No. 2, Op. 10: Recorded: June 15 & July 9, 1958; LP: P(SP)-8472 Testament 1072; Producer: Robert E. Myers; Engineer: Sherwood Hall III | Gramophone Magazine: "If you remain unconvinced that this quartet (note: by Kodaly) is a piece of stature, listen to the Hollywood Quartet. In terms of sheer conviction, I am not so sure that their performance isn't the best ever." |
| 1958 | Villa-Lobos String Quartet No. 6 (1938): Recorded: July 28 and August 5 & 6, 1958; LP: P(SP)-8472; Producer: Robert E. Myers; Engineer: Carson Taylor | Although this was the second time the HSQ had recorded this work, the September,1959 issue of High Fidelity Magazine stated: "This disc contains the only string quartet by Villa Lobos now available on American records ... it is ... a masterpiece in the impressionist tradition; it goes on where the Ravel quartet leaves off...both works (issued with the Kodaly) are given performances of marvellous sensitivity and the registrations are first-rate" |
