= Leonard Slatkin =

American conductor, author and composer (born 1944)

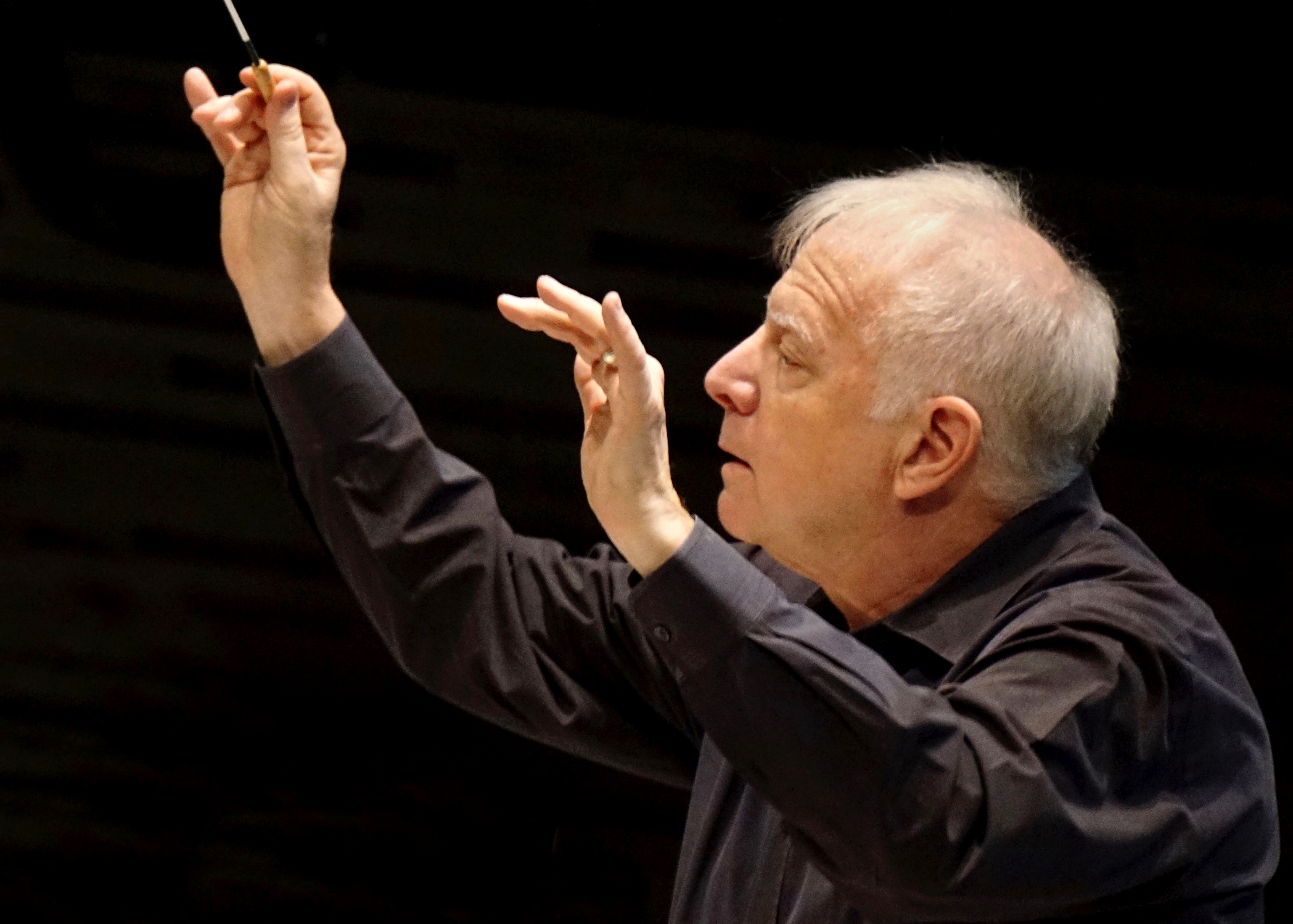
Leonard Slatkin in 2015

Leonard Edward Slatkin (born September 1, 1944) is an American conductor, author and composer.

== Early life and education ==
Slatkin was born in Los Angeles to a Jewish musical family that came from areas of the Russian Empire now in Ukraine. His father, Felix Slatkin, was the violinist, conductor and founder of the Hollywood String Quartet, and his mother, Eleanor Aller, was the cellist with the quartet. His brother, Frederick, a cellist, traced the family's original name as Zlotkin, and adopted that form of the family surname for himself professionally. Frederick Zlotkin spoke of the family lineage as follows:

"The Zlotkin/Slatkin lineage is Russian-Jewish. The first Zlotkin arrival to the US was Felix's father, grandpa Chaim Peretz Zlotkin, who came to settle with relatives in St. Louis in 1904; he (or the clerk at Ellis Island) changed the name. He probably came from the town of Mogilev, from a shtetl (the Russians forced most Jews to live in villages outside of the major cities)...The Altschuler [Aller] side of the family is really rife with musicians. [My grandfather] Grisha's uncle, Modest Altschuler, was a cellist (making me 4th generation) and he had quite a career. Among other things, he did the St. Petersburg premiere of Tchaikovsky's Souvenir de Florence Sextet. When he came to America he formed the Russian Symphony Orchestra (early 1900s)."

Slatkin studied at Indiana University and Los Angeles City College before attending the Juilliard School, where he studied conducting under Jean Morel. He also studied with Walter Susskind at the Aspen Music Festival and School.

== Career ==
Slatkin's conducting debut was in 1966 when he became artistic director and conductor of the award-winning New York Youth Symphony, and in 1968 Walter Susskind named him the assistant conductor of the St. Louis Symphony Orchestra. While in St. Louis, Slatkin hosted for three years a weekly KDNA radio station program called The Slatkin Project. He left St. Louis in 1977 to become music director of the New Orleans Symphony.

He led a series of Beethoven festivals with the San Francisco Symphony during the late 1970s and early 1980s. These annual concerts, held during June, included the orchestra's final concert in San Francisco's War Memorial Opera House in 1980, which featured a performance of Beethoven's ninth symphony.

Slatkin returned to Saint Louis in 1979 as music director of the Saint Louis Symphony Orchestra. The national profile of the orchestra increased notably under his tenure, and the SLSO became one of the most acclaimed orchestras in the country. The ensemble toured and recorded frequently and impressed critics and audiences alike with its fine musicianship and creative musical direction. In 1985, he recorded the first digital stereo version of Tchaikovsky's The Nutcracker with the SLSO. (This was also the first complete Nutcracker issued on compact disc.) Upon the conclusion of his tenure in 1996, Slatkin became the SLSO's conductor laureate. His recorded work with that orchestra was represented on RCA Victor Red Seal, EMI, Vox Records, and Telarc. Slatkin became a devoted fan of the St. Louis Cardinals baseball team during his tenure in St Louis and has retained his interest in the Cardinals since his departure from St Louis.

Slatkin was the director of the Blossom Festival of the Cleveland Orchestra from 1990 to 1999. Slatkin was music director of the National Symphony Orchestra in Washington, D.C. from 1996 to 2008. Noted for putting the "national" back in National Symphony with programs highlighting twentieth-century American works, Slatkin received both praise for improving the overall quality of the orchestra and criticism for under-rehearsal of the NSO. Slatkin was a guest conductor for the American Russian Young Artists Orchestra.

In 2000, Slatkin became the chief conductor of the BBC Symphony Orchestra. In 2001, he was only the second non-British person to conduct the Last Night of the Proms (the first had been an Australian, Sir Charles Mackerras). This performance occurred in the wake of the September 11, 2001 terrorist attacks, and included changes to the traditional second half of the concert, most notably a performance of the Barber Adagio for Strings in honor of the victims. He held this post until September 11, 2004, the 110th Last Night. There were reports of tension between Slatkin and the orchestra, whose secure finances were said to have "fostered a culture of superiority and recalcitrance," as well as negative concert reviews, which contributed to his short tenure with the BBCSO. Previously in the UK, Slatkin was principal guest conductor of the Philharmonia Orchestra from 1997 to 2000 and made a series of digital recordings for RCA with them, including the symphonies of Ralph Vaughan Williams. In 2004, the Los Angeles Philharmonic named him principal guest conductor at the Hollywood Bowl for a two-year period; he was subsequently given a third year in the position, with his tenure ending in September 2007. In 2005, he became the principal guest conductor of the Royal Philharmonic Orchestra, London.

In 2006, Slatkin was named the music advisor to the Nashville Symphony Orchestra. In that capacity, he conducted the inaugural concert of the Schermerhorn Symphony Center on September 9, 2006. In June 2007, Slatkin was announced as the next principal guest conductor of the Pittsburgh Symphony Orchestra, and he assumed this post in 2008. On October 27, 2006, the Jacobs School of Music announced the appointment of Slatkin to the faculty at Indiana University as a part-time teacher of conducting and composition.

On October 7, 2007, Slatkin announced he had reached agreement on a three-year contract, followed by a two-year option, to become the new music director of the Detroit Symphony Orchestra, beginning with the 2008–2009 subscription season. Slatkin stated that he would relocate to the Detroit area. His contract in Detroit called for 5 weeks of subscription concerts in the 2008–2009 season, and 13 weeks in the 2009–2010 season. Slatkin conducted his first concert as music director in Detroit in December 2008. In February 2010, the orchestra announced the extension of Slatkin's contract as music director through the 2012–2013 season. This also included an announcement that Slatkin would take a salary reduction to help relieve the financial difficulties of the orchestra. In November 2011, the orchestra announced the extension of Slatkin's Detroit contract through the 2015–2016 season. In December 2014, the DSO announced the extension of his contract through August 2017, when it then becomes year-to-year. Slatkin stated that the projected year-to-year part of the contract did not mean that he planned to leave, only that at his age "it makes more sense to stay flexible." He also said, "We're in the fun part right now." In December 2015, the DSO announced an extension of Slatkin's contract as music director through the 2017–2018 season, after which time he is scheduled to relinquish the music directorship of the orchestra and to become its first-ever music director laureate, holding the latter post at least through the 2019–2020 season. In the music director laureate role, he will program and conduct four weeks a season and advise on artistic and personnel matters. Slatkin is credited with having rebuilt the DSO after a six-month strike and elevating it as a pillar of civic pride through innovative live webcasts and engaging community programming.

Slatkin's compositions include The Raven (1971) for narrator and orchestra after Edgar Allan Poe, and Kinah (2015), an elegy dedicated to the memory of his parents, which received its world premiere with the Detroit Symphony Orchestra in December 2015. He published his debut book, Conducting Business: Unveiling the Mystery Behind the Maestro, in 2012. In addition to his earlier Saint Louis recordings for RCA and EMI, Slatkin has conducted several recordings for the Naxos label, including the first commercial recording of William Bolcom's Songs of Innocence and of Experience, which received Grammy awards for Best Classical Album and Best Choral Performance.

On November 1, 2009, Slatkin suffered a heart attack while conducting in the Netherlands. In May 2010, the Orchestre National de Lyon announced the appointment of Slatkin as its music director, effective with the 2011–2012 season. With the ONL, he has recorded works by Saint-Saëns, Ravel, and Berlioz on the Naxos label. Slatkin stood down as music director of the ONL after the 2016–2017 season, and subsequently took the title of Directeur musical honoraire of the ONL.

On May 4, 2019, a new radio program hosted by Slatkin, The Slatkin Shuffle, was announced. On April 1, 2020, it was opened up to national distribution via Public Radio Exchange.

In July 2025, the Nashville Symphony announced the re-appointment of Slatkin as its music advisor, effective with the 2025–2026 season, for a term of three seasons. In February 2026, the Nashville Symphony announced the appointment of Slatkin as its next music director, effective with the 2026–2027 season, with a set tenure through the 2028–2029 season. In September 2026, the Nashville Symphony Orchestra declared a financial emergency and cancelled its 2026–2027 season.

== Honors ==
- In 1984, Leonard Slatkin won the Grammy Award for Best Classical Orchestral Recording with the St. Louis Symphony Orchestra for Prokofiev's Symphony No. 5.
- In 1986, he received the Decoration of Honor in Silver from the Austrian ambassador to the United States for outstanding contributions to cultural relations.
- In 1990, Leonard Slatkin was inducted into the St. Louis Walk of Fame.
- In 1991, his recording of the Barber Piano Concerto with soloist John Browning and the St. Louis Symphony Orchestra won the Grammy Award for Best Instrumental Soloist with Orchestra.
- In 1996, his recording with the National Symphony Orchestra of John Corigliano's Of Rage and Remembrance/Symphony No. 1 won the Grammy Award for Best Classical Album.
- In 1997, he was awarded Phi Mu Alpha Sinfonia's Charles E. Lutton Man of Music Award at its national convention in Cincinnati, Ohio. He had been initiated as a national honorary member of the Fraternity in 1987.
- In 2003, he was awarded the National Medal of Arts.
- In 2004, he earned the rank of Chevalier in the French National Order of the Legion of Honor.
- In 2005, the League of American Orchestras presented him with the Gold Baton Award.
- In 2005, he received Grammy awards for Best Classical Album and Best Choral Performance for William Bolcom's Songs of Innocence and of Experience.
- In 2007, his recording of Joan Tower's Made in America with the Nashville Symphony won Grammy awards in the Best Classical Album and Best Orchestral Performance categories.
- In 2013, Slatkin was the recipient of the ASCAP Foundation Deems Taylor Special Recognition Award for his book, Conducting Business.

== Personal life ==
Slatkin has been married four times. His first three marriages, to Beth Gootee, to Jerilyn Cohen, and to soprano Linda Hohenfeld, ended in divorce. He has a son, Daniel Slatkin, from his marriage to Hohenfeld. Slatkin married his fourth wife, the composer Cindy McTee, on November 20, 2011. They moved to the St. Louis suburb of Clayton, Missouri, in 2018.

Cultural offices
Preceded by Jun Märkl	Music Director, Orchestre National de Lyon; 2011–2017	Succeeded by Nikolai Szeps-Znaider
Preceded by Giancarlo Guerrero	Music Director, Nashville Symphony; 2026–present	Succeeded by incumbent
