= Eleanor Aller =

American cellist (1917–1995)

Eleanor Aller (Slatkin) (May 20, 1917 – October 12, 1995) was an American cellist and founding member, with her husband, Felix Slatkin, of the Hollywood String Quartet.

== Life and career ==
Born in New York City, she was the daughter of cellist Gregory Aller (né Grisha Altschuler), a Jewish emigre from the Russian Empire. Her mother Fannie had studied piano at the Warsaw Conservatory. Eleanor attended Juilliard where she studied with Felix Salmond.

Eleanor Aller became principal cellist in the Warner Bros. Studio Orchestra in 1939, in which her brother, pianist Victor Aller, later became orchestra manager and in which their father also played for a time. She was the first woman to hold a principal chair in a Hollywood studio orchestra. The same year she met and married Felix Slatkin. Shortly after their marriage, the couple founded the Hollywood String Quartet. Aller also continued working as a Hollywood studio musician. She performed the Cello Concerto by Erich Korngold for the soundtrack of the movie Deception starring Bette Davis and Paul Henreid. Eleanor also performed the concert premiere of the Concerto with the Los Angeles Philharmonic in 1946.

Aller won a Grammy Award in 1958 as a member of the Hollywood String Quartet for Beethoven's Op. 130. After Slatkin's death in 1963, in addition to her work with orchestras for movies, Aller played in orchestras for recordings done by Frank Sinatra, who had become a family friend over the years.

Aller continued to work as principal cellist for movie soundtracks, including a solo specially written for her by composer/conductor John Williams for the soundtrack to the 1977 Steven Spielberg movie Close Encounters of the Third Kind.

Her two sons are the conductor Leonard Slatkin and the cellist Frederick Zlotkin. She has three grandchildren, including film composer Daniel Slatkin.
