= Luisa Espinel =

American singer, dancer and actress (1892 - 1963)

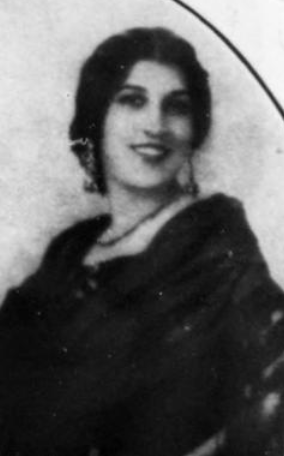
- Luisa Espinel, from a 1928 newspaper.
- Born: Luisa Ronstadt; December 8, 1892; Tucson, Arizona
- Died: February 2, 1963 (aged 70); Los Angeles, California
- Occupation(s): Singer, dancer, actress
- Parent: Federico José María Ronstadt
- Relatives: Linda Ronstadt (niece)

Luisa Espinel (December 8, 1892 – February 2, 1963), born Luisa Ronstadt, was an American singer, dancer, and actress. She toured, taught, performed in vaudeville, and appeared in a movie with Marlene Dietrich.

== Early life ==
Luisa Ronstadt was born in Tucson, Arizona in 1892, the daughter of Mexican-born businessman and musician Federico José María Ronstadt, and his wife Sara Levin. Her mother died in 1902, from a fever, and her father remarried, to Lupe Dalton; one of their granddaughters was singer Linda Ronstadt, who recalled "visits from Aunt Luisa" as "wonderfully exciting." Luisa Espinel went to San Francisco, New York, and Paris to study music; she went to Spain to study Spanish music and dance in the 1920s.

== Career ==
Espinel toured as a dancer and singer in the western states and in vaudeville. She was a member of the Mexican Players of Claremont, California in the 1930s. She taught music and dance in Los Angeles, toured and gave concerts in folk-inspired costumes, and danced in the film The Devil Is a Woman (1935), starring Marlene Dietrich. In 1946 she compiled a book of traditional lyrics, Canciones de mi padre: Spanish Folksongs from Southern Arizona, released by University of Arizona. In the 1950s, she taught Spanish to adults in Pasadena, and was a presenter at the Casa de Adobe, a recreated Californio residence at the Southwest Museum.

== Personal life ==
In 1935, Espinel became the second wife of the American artist Charles Kassler, and was a model for his 1934 mural "Pastoral California", in Fullerton, California. She died in 1963, aged 71, in Los Angeles. Her papers are in the Ronstadt family collections at the University of Arizona and the Arizona Historical Society libraries.
