= Felix Slatkin =

American conductor

Felix Slatkin (December 22, 1915 – February 8, 1963) was an American violinist and conductor.

== Biography ==
Slatkin was born in St. Louis, Missouri to a Jewish family originally named Zlotkin (though it is not certain) from areas of the Russian Empire now in Ukraine. He began studying the violin at the age of nine with Isadore Grossman. He began working professionally at the age of ten and won a scholarship to the Curtis Institute, where he studied violin with Efrem Zimbalist and conducting with Fritz Reiner.

At age 17 he joined the St. Louis Symphony and formed a chamber orchestra of young musicians. In 1935 he won a competition which included a solo appearance with the Hollywood Bowl Symphony Orchestra and Jose Iturbi. Around this time he met cellist Eleanor Aller, also of Russian Jewish extraction, whom he later married. During the Second World War, he served his country as a musician at the Santa Ana Air Force Base and as a conductor of the Army Air Force Tactical Command Orchestra, an organization that raised over $100 million in war bonds.

He settled in Los Angeles and accepted the post of concertmaster for Twentieth Century Fox Studios, performing numerous violin solos in motion pictures such as How Green Was My Valley and How to Marry a Millionaire. In 1939 he founded the highly acclaimed Hollywood String Quartet, which produced over 21 albums for Capitol Records and toured the United States, Europe, Australia and New Zealand, including a special appearance in 1957 for the Edinburgh Festival. In 1958, the quartet won a Grammy Award for Best Classical Performance-Orchestra from the National Academy of Recording Arts and Sciences for its recording of Beethoven's Op. 130.

His conducting career included his founding of the Concert Arts Orchestra and appearances with the Hollywood Bowl Symphony Orchestra. He was Frank Sinatra's concertmaster and conductor of choice during the Capitol years of the 1950s. He made over 25 recordings with these orchestras, also on the Capitol label, including a recording of Offenbach’s Gaîté Parisienne (a ballet arranged by Manuel Rosenthal), which won a Grammy Award in 1958. He also made over a dozen recordings for Liberty Records establishing “The Fantastic Strings, Fantastic Fiddles, Fantastic Percussion, and Fantastic Brass of Felix Slatkin.” In 1962, his recording entitled Hoedown won a Grammy nomination. In 1995, the Hollywood Quartet won the London Grammaphone award for their recording of Schoenberg's Verklärte Nacht and Schubert’s Quintet in C Major.

Felix Slatkin died from a heart attack at the age of 47.

== Family ==
Felix's son Leonard Slatkin is the conductor laureate of the Detroit Symphony Orchestra, and his other son, Frederic Zlotkin (1947–2022, who used the original Russian form of the family name), was principal cellist for the New York City Ballet and cellist of the Lyric Piano Quartet. He has three grandchildren, including film music composer Daniel Slatkin.
