= Earle Spencer =

American jazz trombonist and bandleader (1925–1973)

Robert Earle Spencer (born 26 June 1925 Welborn, Kansas – 19 September 1973 Fillmore, Utah) was an American trombonist and leader of a progressive swing big band bearing his name — Earle Spencer and His Orchestra. He formed the band in 1946 and disbanded in 1949. The band recorded for Black & White Records — a label so named by its founder, Les Schreiber, to reflect the races of its recording artists.

== History of the Earle Spencer Orchestra ==
Spencer was a trombonist who, after playing in the band that he led from 1946 to 1949, gave up playing entirely, due partly to a heart murmur, due partly to the hard economics of big bands in that began in the late 1940s, and due partly to the band's record label, Black & White Records, which went out of business in October 1949.

Towards the end of World War II, a conscious movement towards the creation of a new style of big band jazz became apparent on America's west coast. The longest established of these self-styled "progressives" was Stan Kenton; then came Boyd Raeburn, and finally Earle Spencer.

In 1946, Spencer formed his band in Los Angeles after being discharged from the U.S. Navy. Its compositions were progressively styled in the spirit of Stan Kenton, Johnny Richards, and Boyd Raeburn. High-note trumpeter Al Killian, trombonist Tommy Pederson, tenorman Lucky Thompson, trumpeter Buddy Childers and altoist Art Pepper, were among the notable members. Spencer apparently dropped out of music altogether by the end of 1949 – when he was still just 23 – and nothing much has been heard from him since.

When Kenton was in his Artistry in Rhythm phase, Earle Spencer was running a roadshow version of the same thing. The evidence is on Concert in Jazz, Tops 1532, dimmed by relatively inadequate recording.

The March 5, 1949 Billboard magazine listed the Earle Spencer Orchestra as a "B" Band — one that grossed less than $200,000, but more than $100,000 during 1948. Its booking agent firm was General Artist Corporation.

Big bands were finding it difficult to survive in the late 1940s and were faced with limited bookings; so Spencer disbanded after a gig in Dallas.

Edward Franklin Gabel ("Gabe;" 1924–2014) left Kenton as Kenton's bandboy to work for Earle Spencer as manager in 1947.

== Critical acclaim ==
"Box Lunch (at the Factory)," arranged by Paul Nelson (Black & White 875–A): The always interesting Earle Spencer has a potent, futuristic, impressionist work here. Complex working, stratospheric brass figures, intricate rhythms, and a terrific scream trumpet chorus make this a sure bet for amateurs of the super modern.

== Notable band personnel ==
Unknown period

- Ruben Leon

1946 notable personnel

- Wilbur Schwartz (clarinet, alto sax), formerly with Glenn Miller
- Ray Linn (trumpet) formerly with Tommy Dorsey
- Bob Lively (alto saxophone), formerly with Stan Kenton
- Bob Haywood (vocalist)
- Morty Corb (arranger)
- Frank Erickson (arranger)

1948 notable personnel

- Frank Isola (20 February 1925 Detroit – 12 December 2004 Detroit) (drums)
- Anthony Robert (Tony) Ortega (born 1928), lead alto sax
- Toni Aubin and Jerry Hegeman (from Fort Worth) joined the band while it was performing in Fort Worth. The band was booked first at the Lake Worth Casino, then 3 nights at the Bagdad Club.
- Toni Aubin (1924–1990) (Note: Toni Aubin's maiden name was Maria Antoinette Rubio; later known as Mary Phillips (Howard Ansley Phillips); she had a baby girl in 1951, but gave her for adoption; also has a son, Ian Charles Phillips (born 30 Sep 1949 Pasadena), whom she raised; she married Jack Stanley Lanning (1923–2000) in 1954.) had married Howard Ansley Phillips (1929–2010) who, from 1947 to 1949, played saxophone in the band. Aubin recorded "Sunday Afternoon" and other songs with the Spencer orchestra, but also recorded with the Louis Ohls Orchestra (Note: Louis Moritz Ohls, Jr. (1923–2004).) out of Arkadelphia, and the Phil Carreón Big Band out of Los Angeles, California.
- Jerry Hegman

== Performance venues ==
California

- Majestic Ballroom, Nu-Pike, Long Beach
- Municipal Auditorium, Long Beach

Oregon

- Golden Canopy Ballroom, Jantzen Beach

Texas

- Bagdad Supper Club, Grand Prairie
- Lake Worth Casino, Fort Worth

Utah

- Rendezvous Ballroom, Salt Lake City

== Discography ==
Earle Spencer & His Orchestra

- Hollywood, California, August 16, 1946

James Lawrence Salko (1919–2003), Paul R. Lopez (born 1923), Bob Fowler, Richard (Dick) Binns (1920–1993), Clair Jones (tp) Earle Spencer, Ray Heath, Jr., Durward Morsch, Eugen Manson, Marshall Cram (tb) Les Robinson, Galen McReynolds (cl, as) Ralph Lee, Joe Koch (cl, ts) Hy Mandell (bar) Jack Marshall (g) Tommy Todd (p) Red Callender (b) Jackie Mills (born 11 March 1922 New York City) (d) Paul F. Polena, William (Bill) Gillette, Morty Corb, Paul Nelson, Frank Erickson (arr)

BW349: "Concerto for Guitar," Bill Gillette, arranger
BW350: "Bolero in Boogie," Paul Francis Polena, composer, 78 rpm B&W OCLC 45771745
BW351: "Production on Melody" 78 rpm B&W OCLC 45771745
BW352: "Soft and Warm," Johnny Eppolito; composer, Ralph Lee, tenor solo (Note: The Jazz Discography Online, Tom Lord (ed.), incorrectly lists Morty Corb as arranger.)
BW353: "Lover Man," Paul Nelson, arranger (unissued)
"Earle meets Stan," Frank Erickson, arranger

- Hollywood, California, September 5, 1946

Al Killian, James Lawrence Salko (1919–2003), Bob Fowler, Richard (Dick) Binns (1920–1993), Clair Jones (tp) Earle Spencer, Ollie Wilson, Durward Morsch, Eugen Manson, Marshall Cram (tb) Skeets Herfurt, William Hudspeth (cl, as) Herbert Bickford (Herbie) Steward (1926–2003), Francis "Frank" Polifroni (né Francis Louis Polifroni; 1919–1996) (cl, ts) Bob Snell (bar) Tony Rizzi (g) Milt Raskin (p) Artie Shapiro (b) Jackie Mills (born 11 March 1922 New York City) (d) William (Bill) Gillett, Harry Paul Wham (1919–1983) (arr)

BW384: "E.S. Boogie" (part 2), William Gillett, arranger
BW385: "E.S. Boogie" (part 1), William Gillett, arranger
BW386: "Spenceria" (unissued)
BW387: "Rhapsody in Boogie" (part 1), Harry Paul Wham (1919–1983), arranger

- Hollywood, California, September 6, 1946

Les Robinson (cl, as) replaces Skeets Herfurt, James McGee (fhr) Richard G. Hofmann (fhr) Paul F. Polena (p-1) Bob Hayward (vcl) Frank Erickson (arr) added
BW388: "Amber Moon"
BW389: "Spencerian Theory" (part 2) Bob Hayward, vocal, Frank Erickson, arranger
BW390: "Rhapsody in Boogie" (part 2), Harry Paul Wham (1919–1983), arranger
BW391: "Spencerian Theory" (part 1), Bob Hayward, vocal, Frank Erickson, arranger

- Hollywood, California, October 19, 1946

Al Killian, Frank Beach, Bob Fowler, Richard (Dick) Binns (1920–1993), Mike Bryan (tp) Earle Spencer, Ollie Wilson, Durward Morsch, Eugen Manson, Ray Sims (Raymond C. Sims; 1921–2000), Jim Gales (tb) William Hudspeth, Les Robinson (cl, as) Raph Lee, Don Francis Lodice (1919–1995) (ts) Hy Mandell (bar) Hal Schaefer (p) Gene Sargent (g) The Arvin Garrison Quintet (1) : Arvin Garrison, Barney Kessel, Irving Ashby, Tony Rizzi, Gene Sargent (g-1) Artie Shapiro (b) Sam Weiss (d)

BW529: "Five Guitars in Flight" (we out,1)
BW530: "Polychronic Suite" (unissued)
BW531: "Gangbusters," music by Paul Francis Polena
BW532: "Piano Interlude," William Gillett, arranger

- Live Casino Gardens Ballroom, Ocean Park, California, November, 1946

Sensation Of The Year 1946: Earl Spencer And His New Band — the following are probable personnel: Al Killian, Paul R. Lopez (born 1923), Bob Fowler, Clair Jones, Richard (Dick) Binns (1920–1993) (tp) Ray Sims, Ollie Wilson, Durward Morsch, Eugen Manson (tb) Ronnie Lang (born Ronald Langinger; 24 July 1929 Chicago), William Huspeth (as) Ralph Lee, Francis Polifroni (ts) Steve Perlow (bar) Bob Clarke (p) Tony Rizzi (g) Morty Corb (b) Bobby White (born Robert E. White; 28 June 1926, Chicago) (d) Doris Clark (vcl)

1. "Theme"
2. "Spenceria"
3. "I May Be Wrong"
4. "Hey Mr. Postman," Doris Clark, vocal
5. "In the Hall of the Mountain King"
6. "The Flying Saucer"
7. "Hey-Ba-Ba-Re-Bop," Doris Clark, vocal
8. "Bolero in Boogie"
9. "Progressions in Boogie" (Into)
10. "The Theme"

Note: Possibly from AFRS Jubilee No. 257

- Live U.S. Services Hospital, California, November, 1946
1. "E.S. boogie" (first movement)
- Unknown location, November, 1946
1. "E.S. Boogie" (second movement)

Possibly from AFRS Jubilee No. 288 or 289

- AFRS Jubilee 238, Auditorium, McCormick General Hospital, Pasadena, California, June 1947; some of the material of Jubilee No. 238 was again used for Jubilee No. 288 and Jubilee No. 299

Side 1

01: Introduction & theme: "One O‘Clock Jump"
01: "Signature Theme"
01: "E.S. Boogie"
02: "Please Be Kind" - v BD
03: "Ornithology"
04: "Marcheta"

Side 2

01: "Bolero in Boogie"
05: "Heartaches" - v JA
03: "Body and Soul"
01: "In the Hall of the Mountain King," arranged by Frank Erickson
01: Signoff & Theme: "One O'Clock Jump" (nc)
Al Killian, Frank Beach, Ray Linn, Paul R. Lopez (born 1923), trumpets; Ollie Wilson, Tommy Pederson, Hal Smith, trombones; Barbara Lee, Wilbur Schwartz, alto saxes: Ralph Lee, Lucky Thompson, tenor saxes; Hy Mandel, baritone sax; Paul Francis Polena (born 1925), (Note: Polena (born 1925) had played piano with Frankie Carle and Henry Busse.) piano; Arv Garrison, guitar; Harry Babasin, string bass; Jackie Mills (born 11 March 1922 New York City), drums; Earle Spencer, leader; Bill Gillette, arranger

- Radio Recorders, 7000 Santa Monica Boulevard, Hollywood, California, February 7, 1949

Tony L. Faccinto (1927–2006), Buddy Childers, Joseph Gerald "Jerry" Munson, Jack Gerheim (Jacob William Garehime, Jr.; 1923–2004), Clyde Melvin Reasinger (born 1927) (trumpets); Earle Spencer, Jimmy Knepper, Junior Durward Morsch, Harry John Forbes, Earl Burgess Hamlin (1915–2008) (trombone) Art Pepper, Herb Geller (clarinet, alto sax), Thomas Kelly (Tommy) Makajon (1926–1981), Stanley Edward Heaney (clarinet, tenor sax), Howard Ansley Phillips (1929–2010) (bar) Robert Shannon Fletcher (piano) Laurindo Almeida (guitar), Willie Slater (b) Roy Edwin Hall (drums); Toni Aubin (vcl)
BW730-3: "Oh, You Beautiful Doll"
BW731-1: "Jazzbo," Paul Nelson, arranger
BW732-1: "Sunday Afternoon," Toni Aubin, vocal; Paul Nelson, arranger
BW733-2: "Box Lunch" ("at the factory"), Paul Nelson, arranger

This session, one of Geller's earliest commercial recordings and the last of the Spencer orchestra, has personnel discrepancies with other sources, including:

- Earnest Edwards, Jr., Big Bands, Volume 6, Erngeobil Publications, Whittier, California (1968) OCLC 9255167 OCLC 777913803
- Earnest Edwards, Jr., The New Art Pepper Discography, CODA (publisher), Toronto, Vol 9, No. 7, pps. 32–33 (B) (May/June 1970) ISSN 0820-926X; ISSN 0010-017X
- Todd Selbert's Discography of Art Pepper used in the 1979 autobiography, Straight Life: The Story of Art Pepper, co-written with his third wife, Laurie Pepper (née Laurie La Pan Miller), posthumously updated by his widow, Laurie Pepper; Da Capo Press (1994) ISBN 0306805588; ISBN 9780306805585
- Liner notes to IAJRC 41 OCLC 25051047
- Jazz Discography: 85 Years of Recorded Jazz, by Walter Bruyninckx & Dominique Truffandier, in CD–ROM format (self published), Mechelen, Belgium (2004) OCLC 162319250

Except for Geller and a few others, the session lists different personnel. For example, Bob Lively is listed on alto sax along with Art Pepper. The personnel listed here are found in the Lord discography and the liner notes to Fresh Sound 2501. According to jazz historian Noal Cohen, Geller remembers being on this session: "I remember that because it was the first time I met and played with Art Pepper. It was around 1947, and perhaps my first recording as a sideman," — email from Geller to jazz historian Noal Cohen, October 4, 2011.

The 1947 date is mentioned in other sources including the famous 11-volume Jepsen Jazz Discographies, but seems unlikely given the number of Stan Kenton musicians present (Childers, Pepper, Almeida, Betts). Historian Cohen feels that 1949 is more reasonable because Kenton had disbanded in late 1948 after which these musicians joined Spencer (reported in Down Beat Magazine).

== Compositions ==
- "E.S. Boogie, Part 1," composed by Earle R. Spencer, © Paul Reiner Music Publishing Co., Inc. (2 May 1949) EU165966
- "E.S. Boogie, Part 2," music by Earle R. Spencer & William (Bill) Gillett © Paul Reiner Music Publishing Co., Inc. (2 May 1949) EU165965
- "Production on Melody," music by Earle R. Spencer & William (Bill) Gillett, © Paul Reiner Music Publishing Co., Inc. (2 May 1949) EU165961
- "Rhapsody in Boogie, Parts 1 & 2," music by Earle R. Spencer & Paul Francis Polena (born 1925) © Paul Reiner Music Publishing Co., Inc. (2 May 1949) EU165960 & EU165959
- "Spencerian Theory, Parts 1 & 2," music by Earle R. Spencer & Paul Francis Polena (born 1925) © Paul Reiner Music Publishing Co., Inc. (2 May 1949) EU165958 & EU165957

Note 1: Paul Reiner (1905–1982) was the founder and president of Black & White Records
Note 2: The copyright entries attribute Spencer as composer, but, he did not compose any of the music. Crediting the band leader in the 1940s was simply a custom.

== Audio samples ==
- Five Guitars in Flight on YouTube

== Bibliography ==
=== Sources ===
Original copyright sources linked to references
- Catalog of Copyright Entries, Part 3 Musical Compositions, Third Series. Library of Congress, Copyright Office.

Vol. 3, Part 5B, January–June 1949, No. 1. pp. 15, 36, 147, 150, 165.

General sources linked to references
- Billboard. Cincinnati. LCCN 89-656137; ISSN 0006-2510, ISSN 2638-3853; OCLC 732913734 (all editions).
1. Zhito, Lee (1818–1995) (February 22, 1947). "On the Stand: Earl Spencer" (performance review). Vol. 59, no. 8. p. 19.
2. "Music – As Written: New York". Vol. 59, no. 12. March 22, 1947. p. 19 (col. 1) – via Google Books.
3. "The Band Biz Story – 1948". Vol. 61, no. 10. March 5, 1949. p. 15 – via Google Books.
4. "Artist Tunes, Label and No." – "Comment". Vol. 61, no. 28. July 9, 1949. p. 165 (col. 1) – via Google Books.
