= Bob Lively =

American jazz saxophonist (1923–1994)

Bob Lively (né Bobby Gene Lively 10 February 1923 Little Rock, Arkansas – 22 September 1994 Los Angeles) was an American jazz saxophonist who flourished during the 1940s swing era.

== Stan Kenton years ==
Lively was a member of the Stan Kenton Orchestra from 1941 to 1945. Kenton's orchestra spent the summer of 1941 playing regularly at the Rendezvous Ballroom in Balboa Beach, California. The Kenton Orchestra struggled a bit after its initial success and its Decca recordings were not big sellers. A stint as Bob Hope's backup radio band was an unhappy experience; Les Brown permanently took Kenton's place. By late 1943 with a Capitol Records contract, a popular record in "Eager Beaver", and growing recognition, the Stan Kenton Orchestra was gradually catching on. Its soloists during the war years included Art Pepper, briefly Stan Getz, altoists Boots Mussulli and Bob Lively, and singer Anita O'Day, who starred on Kenton's first big hit, 1944s "And Her Tears Flowed Like Wine." By 1945 the band had evolved quite a bit. Pete Rugolo became the chief arranger (extending Kenton's ideas), Bob Cooper and Vido Musso offered very different tenor styles, and June Christy was Kenton's new singer. Her hits — including "Tampico" and "Across the Alley From the Alamo" — made it possible for Kenton to finance his more ambitious projects. A popular recording of Laura was made, the theme song from the film Laura, starring actress Gene Tierney, and featured the voices of the band. When Kenton disbanded in early 1949, Harry Betts, Art Pepper, Buddy Childers, and Laurindo Almeida were hired by Earle Spencer.

== Earle Spencer Orchestra ==
Lively performed with the Earle Spencer Orchestra from 1946 to 1949. Earle formed his band in 1946 after being discharged from the U.S. Navy. The band was based in Los Angeles and was modeled after the progressive sounds of Stan Kenton, Johnny Richards, and Boyd Raeburn. His 1946 band included former Glenn Miller sideman Wilber Schwartz on clarinet and alto sax and Ray Linn, who had played with Tommy Dorsey, on trumpet. Bob Lively played alto saxophone. Spencer disbanded his band in 1952. The band recorded for the Black and White label in 1946 and 1949. Bob Haywood was vocalist for the 1946 band. Toni Aubin (1924–1990) (Note: Toni Aubin's maiden name was Maria Antoinette Rubio; later known as Mary Phillips (Howard Ansley Phillips); she had a baby girl in 1951, but gave her for adoption; also has a son, Ian Charles Phillips (born 30 Sep 1949 Los Angeles), whom she raised; she married Jack Stanley Lanning (1923–2000) in 1954.) joined Spencer as female vocalist in 1949. She married Howard Phillips who was playing sax (1947–49) in the band. (Bob Lively was also playing in the band.) Toni Aubin recorded "Sunday Afternoon" and other songs with the Spencer orchestra, but also recorded with the Louis Ohls Orchestra (Note: Louis Moritz Ohls, Jr. (1923–2004)) out of Arkadelphia, and the Phil Carreon Big Band out of Los Angeles, California.

Through his numerous associations, Lively played alto saxophone, clarinet, and piano among the trumpets of Johnny Carroll, Buddy Childers, John Anderson, Gene Roland, Mel Green, the drums of Gene Krupa, John Varney, and saxophonists Stan Getz, Art Pepper, Bob Gioga (1905–1999) and Boots Mussulli (1915–1967). Lively performed with Louis Armstrong, Duke Ellington, Nat King Cole, Woody Herman, Tommy Dorsey, and Benny Goodman.

== Selected discography, sessionography, and transcography ==
=== Stan Kenton and His Orchestra ===
- Stan Kenton Classics (Capitol, 1944–47 [1952])
- The Kenton Era (Capitol, 1940–54, [1955])
- Capitol 178 (1944)

Recorded November 26, 1944, New York
Side A – Matrix: 320-1 "Sweet Dreams, Sweetheart"
Side B – Matrix: 321-1 '"Gotta Be Gettin'"
"Sweet Dreams, Sweetheart" was used in the soundtrack of the 1944 film Hollywood Canteen
OCLC 161991719

- AFRS One Night Stand CBS Broadcast, Hollywood Palladium, November 28, 1944; (Note: AFRS = Armed Forces Radio Service) This performance was originally released as one record and re-released as an LP in 1981 on Queen-Disc (in Florence, Italy) with two other original releases of live Hollywood Palladium performances from 1944: November 28 (AFRS One Night Stand 474), November 30 (AFRS One Night Stand 447), and December 6 (AFRS Downbeat) OCLC 50078984
- AFRS One Night Stand 447, Live Hollywood Palladium, November 30, 1944. This performance was originally released as one record and re-released as an LP in 1981 on Queen-Disc (in Florence, Italy) with two other original releases of live Hollywood Palladium performances from 1944: November 28 (AFRS One Night Stand 474), November 30 (AFRS One Night Stand 447), and December 6 (AFRS Downbeat) OCLC 50078984
- AFRS Jubilee 111, December 5, 1944, re-released 2011 by Sounds of Yester Year Enfield, England and bundled with AFRS Jubilee 156, 231, and 234 OCLC 769130833
- AFRS Downbeat, Live at the Hollywood Palladium December 6, 1944; This performance was originally released as one record and re-released as an LP in 1981 on Queen-Disc (in Florence, Italy) with two other original releases of live Hollywood Palladium performances from 1944: November 28 (AFRS One Night Stand 474), November 30 (AFRS One Night Stand 447), and December 6 (AFRS Downbeat) OCLC 50078984
1. "Taboo"
2. "In a Little Spanish Town"
3. "Seargent's Mess"
4. "And Her Tears Flowed Like Wine"
5. "Russian Lullaby"
- AFRS Downbeat, C.P. MacGregor Studios, Hollywood, California, December 6, 1944 (Note: The C.P. MacGregor Company was a radio transcription service with a studio based in Hollywood that operated from the 1930s through the 1970s producing for radio, television, and slide films.)
1. "Russian Lullaby"
2. "The Very Thought of You"
3. "Number Seven [Balboa Bash]"
4. "I Know That You Know" (de)
5. "The Man I Love"
6. "Our Waltz"
7. "Conversin' With the Brain"
8. "These Foolish Things"
9. "I Didn't Know About You"
- AFRS One Night Stand 608, Hollywood Palladium, December 12, 1944
1. "The Lady in Red"
- Kenton recording session in Hollywood, December 15, 1944

mx 523-1 "Say It Isn't So"
mx 524-3 "Ev'ry Time We Say Goodbye"
mx 525-2 "Are You Livin' Old Man"
mx 526-2 "Balboa Bash"
OCLC 46995412

- Film Tracks: Universal Film Short: Artistry in Rhythm, Hollywood, December 23 & 24, 1944, released as an LP by Joyce Music Corporation 3003, Zephyrhills, Florida, (Note: Joyce Music existed from 1975 to 1990; it was owned by Charles Crane Garrod, Jr. (1923–2008), and Joyce T. Garrod (born 1925)) [198-?] and bundled with two other sessions, July 1943 & December 1945 OCLC 14517693
1. "Theme"
2. "Eager Beaver"
3. "Tabby the Cat"
4. "Siboney"
5. "Taboo"
6. "She's Funny That Way"
7. "Mad for a Pad"
8. "Memphis Lament"
- MacGregor transcriptions, Hollywood, December 14, 1944 OCLC 232277265

MMO-671

1. "Conversin' With the Brain"
2. "Blues" ("Singing the Blues")
3. "Tico Tico"
4. "Special Delivery"

OCLC 47907946, 271020405

MMO-672

1. "Our Waltz"
2. "Pizzicato" from the ballet, Sylvia
3. "Tabby the Cat"
4. "The Man I Love"

OCLC 48679861

MMO-673

1. "Stars in My Eyes"
2. "Sergeants' Mess"
3. "Hindsight"
4. "Masters of Jazz"
5. "And Her Tears Flowed Like Wine"
6. "Blue Skies"

MMO-674

1. "I'm Going Mad for a Pad"
2. "Blow Jack"
3. "She's Funny That Way"
4. "Artistry in Rhythm" (theme)
- Kenton recording session in Hollywood, January 16, 1945, bundled with the June 28, 1945 recording session, released on 78 rpm, Capital Americana (1945) OCLC 781437428
- Spotlight Bands 796, AFRS 641, Waco Army Air Field, Texas, April 5, 1945
- Universal Studios, Chicago, reissued and bundled with other albums in CD format on Collectors’ Choice Music, Itasca, Illinois (1994)

mx 341-4 "Tampico"
mx 342-4 "Southern Scandal"
mx 343-1 "Opus in Pastels"
mx 344-1 "Ooh, What I Dreamed About You" (rejected)

=== Earle Spencer Orchestra ===
- Concert in Jazz, Tops L-1532, February 1949, Los Angeles; reissued by IAJRC as a compilation with other sessions

John Check, Buddy Childers, Jake Gernheim, Jerry Munson (tp), Harry Betts, Harry Forbes, Jimmy Knepper (tb), Bob Lively, Art Pepper (as), Tommy Makagon, Tony Ortega (ts), Howard Phillips (bs), Shannon Fletcher (p), Laurindo Almeida (g), Willie Slater (b), Roy Hall (dms)

== Notes and references ==
=== General references ===
1. "Stan Kenton 1944" (Queen-disc (It) Q-054) (discography), JazzDisco.org
2. Media: "Bob Lively," at AllMusic
3. Library of Congress: Performing Arts Encyclopedia, Jazz on the Screen
4. A Jazz and Blues Filmography by David Meeker, Library of Congress OCLC 70108988
