= Morsch =

Morsch is a surname. Notable people with the surname include:

- Gary Morsch (born 1952), American physician, philanthropist, and author
- Ikina Morsch (born 1956), Dutch gymnast
- J. Durward Morsch (1920–2015), American composer
- Lucile M. Morsch (1906–1972), American librarian
