= Heart to Heart International =

US-based non-profit organization

Logo of Heart to Heart International

Heart to Heart International is a global humanitarian organization based in Lenexa, Kansas, with a mission of seeking to improve healthcare access around the world by ensuring quality care is provided equitably in medically under-resourced communities and in disaster situations.

== History ==
Heart to Heart International was founded in 1992 by Dr. Gary Morsch and other Rotary Club members who delivered medication to victims of the Chernobyl disaster in Russia. In 30 years, it has shipped more than $2.4 billion in humanitarian aid to more than 130 countries. A large focus of HHI's mission is disaster response, and HHI has been a first responder to disasters all over the world. Heart to Heart International's headquarters is located in Lenexa, Kansas.

1992 – Heart to Heart International was founded. The initial mission was an airlift of medical aid to hospitals in Russia. At the time, it was the largest private humanitarian airlift ever. Donated aid was distributed to 32 area hospitals and nine orphanages. A gift from the heart of America to the heart of Russia—the Heart to Heart Airlift—became a reality thanks to hundreds of volunteers and corporate partners.

In 1993, a partnership was created in collaboration between the American Association of Family Physicians (AAFP) and HHI called Physicians With Heart (PWH). PWH conducted 20 airlifts throughout Europe and Vietnam. The partnership mobilized people and resources to improve health, provide medical education and foster the development of family medicine worldwide.

1995 – Volunteers and sponsors worked with HHI to deliver a message of hope and peace to the Vietnamese people. This project launched a partnership with FedEx, whose MD-11 was the first American plane to land in Hanoi since the end of the Southeast Asian conflict. The project was an instrumental part of improving relations between the U.S. and Vietnam.

1996 – HHI delivered $12 million in aid to Calcutta, India. This airlift, designed to help Mother Teresa and the Missionaries of Charity, took three years to organize. The assembly of God Mission Hospital, Sri Ramakrishna Vivekananda Mission, Cancer Centre and Welfare Home, and four large teaching hospitals in Calcutta, among others, were recipients of medical aid and products.

2005 – HHI's response to Hurricane Katrina was its largest and longest humanitarian effort to that point. Before the storm had even subsided, HHI was working with partners, including FedEx, and distributing water, medicine, medical supplies, hygiene items and more. For 18 months after the storm, HHI worked in cities along the Gulf Coast providing medical care and supplies to communities in need.

2010 – HHI responded to the devastating earthquake in Haiti. Staying beyond the earthquake response, HHI hired, trained and helped create Haitian leadership to make a long-lasting change in Haiti. When Hurricane Matthew struck Haiti in 2016, the HHI-trained Haitian medical teams were prepared to respond.

2014 – HHI responded to the Ebola crisis in Liberia by establishing and running an Ebola Treatment Unit. In addition, HHI trained administrators and teachers in the local school district in safe hygiene practices.

2017 – HHI responded with medical teams to three consecutive hurricanes in 2017: Harvey in Texas, Irma in Florida, and Maria in Puerto Rico. The responses overlapped and together became one of the largest responses in HHI history.

2018 – Because of the organization's growth and need for an expanded facility, HHI purchased a new global headquarters with warehouse in Lenexa, Kansas. The new facility enabled HHI to distribute four times the amount of medical and humanitarian aid.

2020 – HHI was heavily involved in every aspect of the COVID-19 pandemic healthcare response, including early virus preparations with the World Health Organization; distribution of PPE, medical aid, and hygiene supplies; and provision of testing, medical care, and vaccinations.

As of January 2024, HHI has contributed over $2.6 billion in aid, sent product to 131 countries, and participated in over 1.1 million hours of volunteer work.

== See also ==
- Canadian Food for the Hungry
- Feed the Children
- Food for the Hungry
- Food for the Poor, Inc.
