= Bobby Hammack =

- Born: Robert Vernor Hammack, Jr. January 22, 1922; Brookston, Texas
- Died: March 28, 1990 (aged 68)
- Genres: Swing music, Popular songs, Big band, Film score
- Occupations: Pianist, Bandleader, Arranger, Composer, Studio musician, Music executive, Freelance musician
- Instrument: piano
- Years active: 1945–1990
- Labels: Capitol, Rhino, Audiophile, Coral, Liberty, Light
- Formerly of: Walt Disney; 1964 New York World's Fair; ABC

Robert Vernor Hammack, Jr. (January 22, 1922 Brookston, Texas – March 28, 1990 Riverside, California) was an American musician, originally from Texas, whose principal instrument was jazz piano. He led a prolific career in Los Angeles as a pianist, organist, conductor, arranger, and composer in live venues, broadcast studios for radio and television, and recording studios for records, radio, television, and film. Hammack flourished in a wide spectrum of genres that included dixieland, Blues, swing, sweet dance music (e.g., Lawrence Welk), easy listening, gospel, liturgical jazz, musical theatre, Tin Pan Alley, classical, and film score.

== Career ==
In 1949, Hammack began appearing KLAC-TV as studio band pianist and, in 1950, guest host — Don Otis Show — and eventually host — Bobby Hammack and Joy Lane. Hammack was the West Coast musical director of the ABC-TV and radio networks between 1958 and 1963, during which he conducted his own orchestra and scored music for several TV shows, including Ed Sullivan, Glen Campbell, Red Skelton, and Johnny Mann's Stand-Up and Cheer. Hammack then was a conductor and a pianist for NBC. He joined ASCAP in 1958. Hammack's popular song compositions include I'm Going Home, Eliza, and You Bug Me.

Hammack got his first break playing piano for Red Nichols as one of his post-war Five Pennies, appearing with Nichols in a number of film shorts in the early 1950s. Hammack also worked as a freelance arranger and writer for Bob Crosby, Lawrence Welk, and Tony Osborne. His version of Raymond Scott's Powerhouse is featured on several space age pop compilations, and he also recorded with Esquivel.

== Formal education ==
Hammack earned a Bachelor of Fine Arts degree, majoring in music, from the University of Texas at Austin in 1945. He had entered as a freshman in the fall 1938, but, beginning September 21, 1942, spent two years in the Air Force, stationed at Muskogee, Oklahoma. At Texas, he studied piano at the newly established (1938) College of Fine Arts with Thomas Arthur Gorton, PhD (1910–1997), who, in addition to being a concert pianist, went on to become Dean of the School of Fine Arts at the University of Kansas from 1950 to 1975.

He graduated from Paris High School in 1938. Hammack was also a proficient trombonist. While in high school and college, Hammack led his own dance orchestra.

== Selected discography ==
As leader

- Powerhouse, The Bobby Hammack Quartet, Liberty Records (1955) OCLC 43645637
- The Bobby Hammack Quintet, ABC Paramount (1956)
- Solid! South Pacific, Bobby Hammack Quintet Liberty Records (1957) OCLC 58594755
- Lovely Hula Hands, Bobby Hammack (organ), Coral Records (195?) OCLC 23804196
- Rhythm, Bobby Hammack Orchestra, Capitol Records (1959)
- Ultra-Lounge, Vol. 3: Space Capades, Bobby Hammack Combo, Capitol Records (1996) OCLC 34783512
- My Favorite Things (side A); The Farewell Song (side B), Swirl Daze (45 rpm) (1960)

As leader of the back-up musical group

- Pink Shoe Laces, Dodie Stevens, Bobby Hammack Combo, Dot Records (45 rpm) (1959) OCLC 527269260

As keyboardist (re-release dates)

- 2004: Original Jazz Compositions, West Coast All-Stars
- 2003: The Drugstore's Rockin', Vol. 3, Pat Boone
- 2003: Tutti's Trumpets and Trombones, Tutti Camarata
- 2002: Morning Glory, Red Nichols
- 2002: The Greatest Original Artists OCLC 62111051
- 2002: The Snader Transcriptions: Dixieland Jazz, Vol. 2, Firehouse Five Plus Two
- 1999: Battle Hymn of the Republic, Red Nichols
- 1999: See It In Sound, Esquivel
- 1998: Happy Jazz, Red Nichols
- 1997: Move Over Darling, Doris Day
- 1983: Tutti's Trombones, Tutti Camarata
- 1963: The Happy Beat, Ray Conniff OCLC 6579098, 6621829 OCLC 34268908, 431087283
- 1961: Mr. Lucky Goes Latin, Henry Mancini OCLC 12886899
- 1959: Dixieland Blues, Johnny Maddox & The Rhythmasters
- Jazz in the Charts, Vol. 90: Everything I Have Is Yours 1948–1949 OCLC 807648736
- 1957: Strictly From Dixie, Morty Corb and His Dixie All Stars OCLC 6697830
- 1996: Cocktail Mix, Vol. 1: Bachelor's Guide to the Galaxy OCLC 34549223

As composer/arranger

- 2009: Walt Disney and the 1964 World's Fair (arranger) OCLC 268801742
- 2005: Deep Velvet/Old Gold and Ivory, George Shearing (orchestration) OCLC 268801742
- 2001: As Time Goes By, Carpenters (arranger) OCLC 55984459
- 1998: Let's Get Together, Hayley Mills (composer) OCLC 39394290
- 1996: Incredibly Strange - Only In America (composer)
- 1996: Ultra-Lounge, Vol. 11: Organs in Orbit (composer)

As conductor

- 2009: This Could Be the Start of Something Good, Jack Jones (conductor)
- 1997: Ultra-Lounge, Vol. 15: Wild Cool & Swingin' Too
- 1995: Hooray for Love: Great Gentlemen of Song, Vol. 1
- 1967: Dale Evans, Roy Rogers, and the Bill Lee Singers, August 10 & 11, 1967, Capitol Records

== Selected filmography ==
Orchestra leader

- What's This Song? (1964)

Composer

- Summer Magic (1963) (orchestration)
- Mickey (17 episodes, 1964–1965)
1. Seaside Westside (September 16, 1964)
2. The Big Jump (September 23, 1964)
3. The Case of the Slippery Slipsy (September 30, 1964)
4. How to Raise Children Without Really Trying (October 7, 1964)by)
5. Mickey Crashes the Movies (October 14, 1964)
6. The Way the Fortune Cookie Crumbles (October 21, 1964)
7. Goodnight, Whoever You Are (October 28, 1964)
8. Nobody Buys Retail (November 4, 1964)
9. Hard Work Never Hurt Anyone (November 11, 1964)
10. Honest Injun (November 25, 1964)
11. Somebody's Been Sleeping in My Bed (December 2, 1964)
12. For the Love of Grandpa Toddie (December 9, 1964)
13. One More Kiss (December 16, 1964) (composer & conductor)
14. Luck O' the Irish (December 23, 1964)
15. The Elephant Mickey Won't Forget (December 30, 1964)
16. Be My Guest (January 6, 1965)
17. Mickey Takes Over (January 13, 1965)
- Vacation Playhouse (1 episode, 1963)
1. Hooray for Love (1963 TV episode)

Music department

- Banjo the Woodpile Cat (1979) (TV) (additional orchestrator)
- Walt Disney's Wonderful World of Color (orchestrator) (2 episodes, 1965)
1. Summer Magic: Part 2 (1965) TV episode (orchestrator)
2. Summer Magic: Part 1 (1965) TV episode (orchestrator)

Actor

- Starlift (1951 film) (uncredited — piano player soldier)

Sideman

- Meet the Dixieland Bands, Volume 2 — Firehouse Five Plus Two, Red Nichols and His Pennies, Pete Daily and His Chicagoians, Swingtime Video (1985)

== Selected musical dramas ==
- It's a Small World, music by the Sherman Brothers, arranged by Hammack

Premiered at the New York World's Fair 1964–1965

- Sam, the Story of the Good Samaritan, by Bobby Hammack & Tom Adair (1973) OCLC 12254982

== Selected radio shows ==
- 1950s: Musical Express with the Bobby Hammack Quintet, AM Radio
- Stars of Jazz, Art Pepper Quartet: Art Pepper, alto sax; Carl Perkins, piano; Ben Tucker (né Benjamin Mayer Tucker; born 1930), acoustic double bass, and Frankie Capp, drums — Bobby Hammack, piano, accompanied vocalist Jo Ann Greer

Aired on channel 7 KABC-TV (channel 7), January 28, 1957
Licensed to and distributed by the Armed Forces Radio and Television Service
Edited and presented on AF-9313 as Show #20

- Cross Country USA, AFRTS 226, January 30, 1978

== Family ==
- One of Hammack's three daughters, Karen Hammack (née Jean Karen Hammack; born 1955), is a studio pianist and music educator based in the Los Angeles area.
