= Brookston =

Brookston can refer to a place in the United States:

- Brookston, Indiana
- Brookston, Minnesota
- Brookston, Texas
