= Al Killian =

American jazz trumpeter and bandleader (1916–1950)

- Born: October 15, 1916; Birmingham, Alabama, United States
- Died: September 5, 1950 (aged 33); Los Angeles, California, United States
- Genres: Big band, jump blues, East Coast blues
- Instrument: Trumpet
- Years active: 1930s–1950

Albert Killian (October 15, 1916 – September 5, 1950) was an American jazz trumpeter and occasional bandleader during the big band era.

== Early life and career ==
Killian was born in Birmingham, Alabama, on October 15, 1916.

Killian got his start playing with Charlie Turner's Arcadians (mid-1930s) and went on to play with big bands led by Baron Lee, Teddy Hill, Don Redman, and Claude Hopkins. In the early to mid-1940s, he swapped between bands led by Count Basie and Charlie Barnet, as well as being with Lionel Hampton for period in 1945. Killian appeared on film several times, but also attracted attention for a racist incident in which he was not part of a film recording. In this, Killian and bandmate Paul Webster, both African Americans, participated in the audio recording of Charlie Barnet's orchestra for Monogram Pictures's Freddie Steps Out, but executives ordered that the subsequent filming of the band be done without them.

In 1946, Killian played with Norman Granz's Jazz at the Philharmonic concert series. An interest in bebop led to Killian forming his own band to play the new music in 1947, but this was short-lived. Following this he briefly toured with bands led by Earle Spencer and Boyd Raeburn, before landing a spot in Duke Ellington's band, with which he toured and recorded from 1947 to 1950. On September 5 of the year that he left Ellington, Killian was murdered in his Los Angeles home by "a psychopathic landlord".

Gunther Schuller wrote in The Swing Era (1989):

Killian was without a doubt the greatest of the Late-Swing-Era high-note lead trumpeters. Not necessarily an outstanding jazz soloist, Killian specialized in stratospheric trumpeting which was totally consistent and often defied belief. His death in Los Angeles at the hands of a crazed landlord in 1950 was a stunning loss to jazz.
