= Sinfonía india =

Synphony by Carlos Chávez

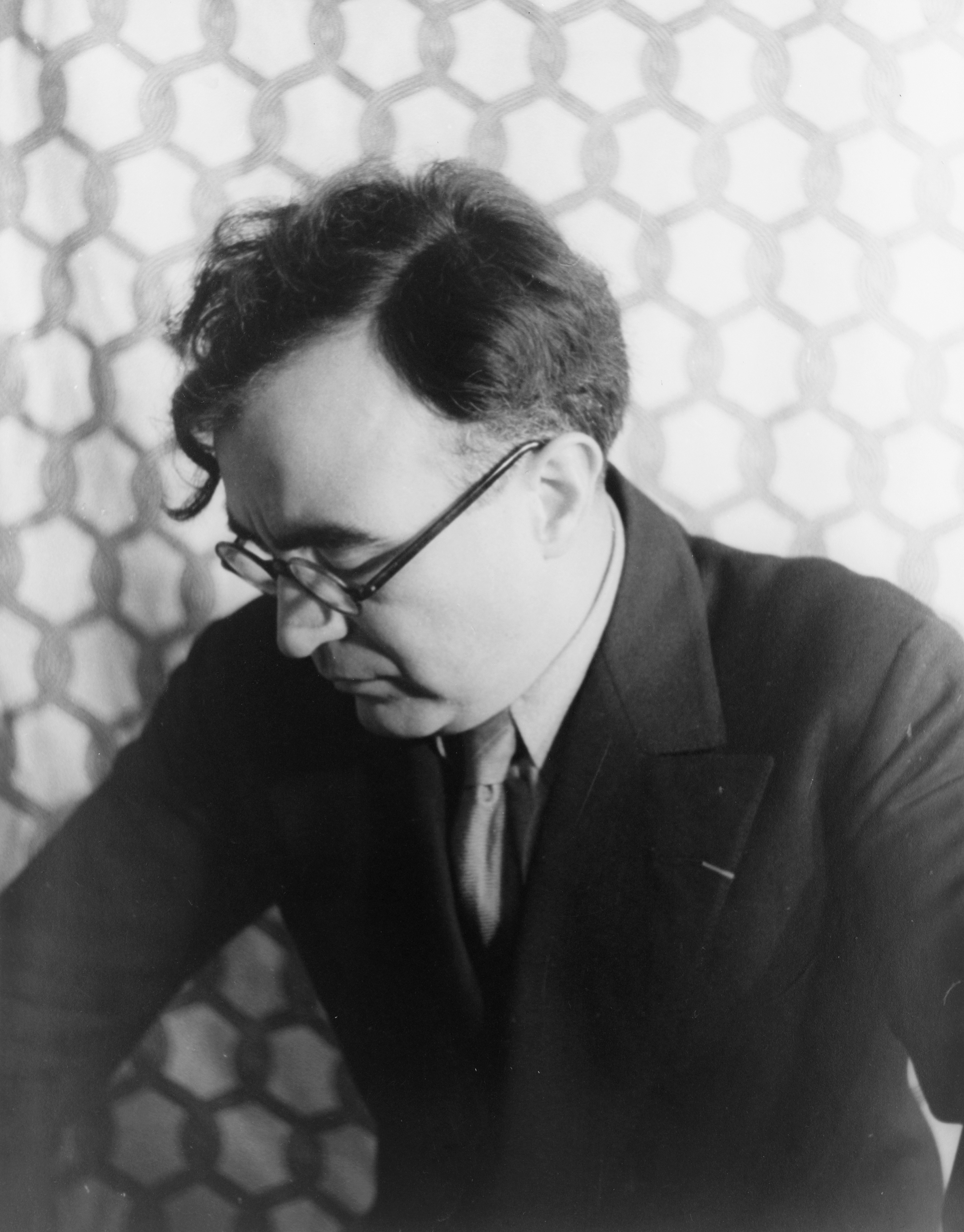
Portrait of Chávez by Carl van Vechten, taken the year after the premiere of the Sinfonía india

Sinfonía india is Carlos Chávez's Symphony No. 2, composed in 1935–36. In a single movement, its sections nevertheless follow the traditional pattern for a three-movement symphony. The title signifies the fact that the thematic material consists of three melodies originating from native-American tribes of northern Mexico. The symphony is Chávez's most popular composition.

== History ==
The Sinfonía india was begun in December 1935, during the composer's first tour of the United States as a conductor, and finished early in the following year. It was premiered under Chávez's direction in a radio performance by the Columbia Broadcasting Orchestra on 23 January 1936, and given its first concert performance by the Boston Symphony Orchestra conducted by the composer on 10 April 1936. The Mexican premiere took place in the capital on 31 July 1936.

This symphony has become immensely popular, and so the primary source of the composer's identity with the public, comparable in this respect with Beethoven's Fifth Symphony and Ravel's Bolero.

In 1971 G. Schirmer, the publisher of the work, issued an arrangement for wind band by Frank Erickson. Although Chávez had not authorised this version, he did conduct it himself in performances, though with some revisions of his own.

== Instrumentation ==
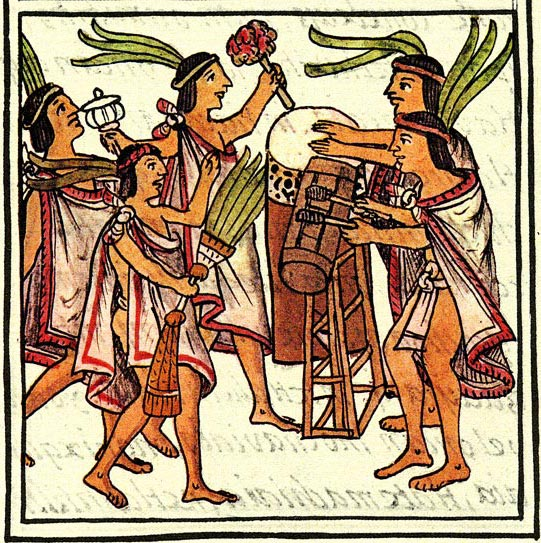
Aztec musicians playing teponaztli (foreground) and huéhuetl, both called for in the Sinfonía india

The symphony is scored for two piccolos (the second interchangeable with third flute), two flutes, three oboes, E♭ clarinet, two clarinets, bass clarinet, three bassoons, four horns, two trumpets, two trombones, timpani, percussion (four players), harp, and strings.

The percussion section originally included a large number of indigenous Mexican instruments, for example the jicara de agua (half of a gourd inverted and partly submerged in a basin of water, struck with sticks), güiro, cascabeles (a pellet rattle), tenabari (a string of butterfly cocoons), a pair of teponaxtles, tlapanhuéhuetl, and grijutian (string of deer hooves). When the score was published, the composer substituted their nearest equivalents in commonly used orchestral percussion, but requested that the originals be used wherever possible.

== Analysis ==
The symphony is based on three Indian melodies (hence the title), which supply the ideas for what are in effect three movements, though they are played without a break. The composer regarded this as a condensation of the traditional three-movement variety of the symphony, in which a third theme takes on the function of a slow movement. This slow, third theme (starting at rehearsal-number 43 in the score) is supported by an austere succession of chords built from fourths. The three main themes are melodies from the Huicholes (or Cora) of Nayarit (the principal theme, beginning at rehearsal number 9), the Yaqui of Sonora (the second and third themes, beginning at rehearsal-numbers 27 and 43, respectively), and the Seris of Tiburón Island in Baja California (theme of the finale, beginning at rehearsal-number 88), supplemented by secondary themes, some of which are also quoted from folklore.

Introduction theme A

Introduction theme B (trumpet)

Introduction theme C

First theme (oboes, 1st violins)

Second theme (E♭ clarinet solo, B♭ clarinets, tenor drum)

Third (slow) theme (horn and flute, over muted trumpets and trombone)

Finale theme (E♭ clarinet, muted trumpet, and güiro)

== Discography ==
In chronological order of recording.

- Carlos Chávez: Sinfonía de Antígona, Sinfonía India; Dietrich Buxtehude (orch. Chávez): Chaconne in E minor. Orquesta Sinfónica de México; Carlos Chávez cond. 4-disc 78-rpm set (monaural), Victor Musical Masterpiece Series. Victor Red Seal M 503 (manual sequence) and DM 503 (automatic sequence). Camden, New Jersey: Victor, 1938.
- Music of Mexico. Orquesta Sinfónica de México; Carlos Chávez, cond. Includes Obertura republicana, El sol (corrido mexicano), and Sinfonía india by Chávez, plus José Pablo Moncayo's Huapango (Decca Gold Label LP, DL9527. [US]: Decca, 1956.
- Carlos Chávez: Sinfonía india, Sinfonía de Antígona, Sinfonía romántica. Stadium Symphony Orchestra, Carlos Chávez, cond. LP recording. Everest LPBR 6029 (monaural), SDBR 3029 (stereo). [Los Angeles]: Everest Records, 1959. Reissued on CD (with the orchestra named as New York Studium Symphony Orchestra), Philips Legendary Classics 422 305-2. [West Germany]: Philips Classics Ptoductions, 1989. Reissued on CD, Everest EVC-9041. New York: Everest Records, 1996. ["Stadium Symphony Orchestra" is the name taken by the New York Philharmonic Orchestra for its summer performances in the Lewisohn Stadium.]
- Latin American Fiesta. (Includes Chávez, Sinfonía india.) New York Philharmonic; Leonard Bernstein, cond. LP recording (stereo). Columbia MS 6514. New York: Columbia Records, 1963. Reissued on CD. Bernstein Century. Sony Classical SMK 60571. New York: Sony Classical, 1998.
- The Six Symphonies of Carlos Chávez . Orquesta Sinfónica Nacional de México; Carlos Chávez, cond. 3-LP set (stereo). CBS Masterworks 32 31 0002 (32 11 0020, 32 11 0022, 32 11 0024). New York: CBS, 1967.
- Carlos Chávez, Sinfonía india; Blas Galindo, Sones de mariachi; José Pablo Moncayo, Huapango; Rodolfo Halffter, Don Lindo de Almería: Suite. Orquesta Sinfónica Nacional de México; Kenneth Klein, cond. LP recording (stereo). Unicorn RHS 365. London: Unicorn, 1979.
- José Pablo Moncayo, Huapango; Carlos Chávez, Sinfonía india; Silvestre Revueltas, Homenaje a Federico García Lorca and Sensemayá. Orquesta Sinfónica del Estado de México; Enrique Bátiz, cond. Recorded at Sala Nezahualcóyotl, Mexico City, 17 and 24 February 1980. LP recording (stereo). Varèse Sarabande VCDM 1000.220. North Hollywood: Varèse Sarabande, 1981. Also issued on EMI/Angel ESD 7146; Hayes Middlesex, England: EMI, 1981.
- Quatre compositeurs mexicains. Carlos Jiménez Mabarak, Ballade du cerf et de la lune; José Pablo Moncayo, Huapango; Silvestre Revueltas, Sensemayá; Carlos Chávez, Sinfonía india. Orquesta Filarmónica de la Ciudad de México; Fernando Lozano, cond. LP recording (stereo). Forlane UM 3551; Cassette tape recording (stereo). Forlane UMK 3551. [France]: Forlane, 1981. Reissued on CD as part of Musique mexicaine de Chávez, Revueltas, Villa-Lobos [sic], Mabarak, Quintanar, Galindo, Halffter, Moncayo. Orquesta Filarmónica de la Ciudad de México; Fernando Lozano, cond. 2-CD set (stereo). Forlane UCD 16688 & 16689. [France]: UMIP, 1993.
- José Pablo Moncayo, Huapango; Silvestre Revueltas, Sensemayá and Ocho por radio; Blas Galindo, Sones de mariachi; Carlos Chávez, Sinfonía india. Xalapa Symphony Orchestra; Luis Herrera de la Fuente, cond. LP recording (12 in., stereo). Vox Cum Laude D-VCL 9033. New York: Moss Music Group, 1982.
- Classical Music of Mexico: Carlos Jiménez Mabarak; José Pablo Moncayo; Silvestre Revueltas; Carlos Chávez. Orquesta Filarmónica de la Ciudad de México; Fernando Lozano, cond. LP recording (12 in., stereo). Desto DC 7218. New York, N.Y.: Desto : Distributed by CMS Records, 1982.
- The Six Symphonies of Carlos Chávez. London Symphony Orchestra; Eduardo Mata, cond. 3-LP set (stereo). Vox Cum Laude 3D-VCL 9032. New York: Moss Music Group, 1983. Reissued on 2-CD set as Carlos Chávez: The Complete Symphonies. VoxBox2 CDX 5061. Hauppauge, NY: Moss Music Group, 1992. Partial reissue on CD: Carlos Chávez: Symphonies Nos. 1, 2 & 3. Vox Cum Laude MCD 10002. New York: Moss Music Group, 1983. This CD also reissued as Vox Unique VU 9020. Hackensack, NJ: Vox Unique, 1990.
- Música mexicana, Vol. 2. Manuel Ponce, Concerto for Violin and Orchestra; Carlos Chávez, "Sinfonia India"; Silvestre Revueltas, La noche de los Mayas. Henryk Szeryng, violin; Enrique Bátiz, cond. CD recording. ASV Digital CD DCA 866. London: Academy Sound and Vision Ltd., 1993.
- Tangazo: Music of Latin America. Carlos Chávez, Sinfonía india; Aaron Copland, Danzón cubano; Amadeo Roldán, Suite de La rebammaramba and Ritmica V; Silvestre Revueltas, Sensemayá; Alejandro García Caturla, Danzas cubanas; Ástor Piazzolla, Tangazo; Alberto Ginastera, Estancia, op. 8. New World Symphony; Michael Tilson Thomas, cond. CD recording (stereo). Argo 436 737-2. London: Argo, 1993. Reissued as Latin American Classics. Eloquence 4676032. 2007.
- Julián Orbón, Tres versiones sinfónicas no. 2; Heitor Villa-Lobos, Bachianas brasileiras no. 2; Antonio Estévez Aponte, Mediodía en el llano; Carlos Chávez Sinfonía india. Orquesta Sinfónica Simón Bolívar; Eduardo Mata, cond. Music of Latin American Masters. Recorded at the Aula Magna, Universidad Central de Venezuela, Caracas, Nov. 1992 and July 1993. CD recording. Dorian DOR-90179; Troy, NY: Dorian, 1994. Reissued as part of 6-CD set, Latin America Alive. Dorian 90914. [N.p.]: Sono Luminus, 2009.
- Silvestre Revueltas, Redes; Carlos Chávez, Sinfonía india; José Pablo Moncayo, Huapango. CD recording (stereo). Orquesta Sinfónica Nacional de México; Enrique Arturo Diemecke, cond. Sony CDEC-470998. [Mexico]: Sony Music Entertainment Mexico, 1994
- Música sinfónica mexicana. Silvestre Revueltas, Sensemayá; Federico Ibarra, Symphony No. 2; Gabriela Ortíz, Concierto candela for percussion; Manuel Enríquez, Ritual; José Pablo Moncayo, Huapango; Joaquín Gutiérrez Heras, Postludio; Mario Lavista, Clepsidra; Marcela Rodríguez, First Concerto for Recorders; Arturo Márquez, Danzón, no. 2; Carlos Chávez, Sinfonía india. Orquesta Filarmónica de la UNAM; Ronald Zollman, cond. Recorded December 1994 – January 1995 in the Sala de Conciertos Nezahualcóyotl. 2-CD set. Urtext Digital Classics JBCC 003—JBCC004. [Mexico]: Urtext Digital Classics, 1995.
- Jiménez Mabarak & Chávez. (Includes Chávez, Sinfonía india). Orquesta Filarmónica de la Ciudad de México; Orquesta Sinfónica "Carlos Chávez"; Rundfunk-Sinfonie-Orchester Leipzig; Fernando Lozano, cond. Clásicos mexicanos. 2-CD set. Spartacus SDL221022. San Pedro de los Pinos, México: Spartacus, 1996.
- Concertino: Música mexicana de concierto: Mexican fireworks. Jose Pablo Moncayo Huapango; Silvestre Revueltas, Sensemayá; Dietrich Buxtehude (arr. Carlos Chávez), Chaconne in E minor; Jose Pablo Moncayo, Sinfonietta; Carlos Chávez, Sinfonía india; Miguel Bernal Jiménez, Concertino for Organ and Orchestra; Blas Galindo, Sones de mariachi. Orquesta Sinfónica Carlos Chávez; Eduardo Diazmuñoz, cond.; Laura Carrasco, organ (6th work)./ Recorded at the Sala de Conciertos Nezahualcóyoti (1st-5th, 7th works) and at the Auditorio Silvestre Revueltas, Conservatorio Nacional de Música (6th work), Mexico, Jun.-Aug. 1997. CD recording. WEA/Warner Music Mexico 3984-20799-2; CS-207992; Nueva Anzures, Mexico: WEA/Warner Classics Mexico, 1997.
- Las mil voces de México. Series: Corona Extra. Contents: Blas Galindo Sones de mariachi; Juventino Rosas (arr. Manuel Enriquez), Vals "Sobre las olas"; Arturo Márquez, Danzón no. 2; Carlos Chávez, Sinfonía india; Consuelo Velazquez (arr. Pocho Pérez) "Bésame Mucho"; José Pablo Moncayo, Huapango; Pepe Guizar (arr. Manuel Enriquez) "Guadalajara". CD recording. [México, D.F?]: Fernando del Paso, 1998.
- Orquesta Filarmónica de Jalisco. Arturo Márquez, Danzón no. 2; José Pablo Moncayo, Tierra de temporal; Silvestre Revueltas, Sensemayá; José Rolón, El festín de los enanos; Carlos Chávez, Sinfonía india. Orquesta Filarmónica de Jalisco; Guillermo Salvador, cond. Recorded in the Auditorio del Sindicato Unico de Trabajadores Electricistas de República Mexicana, Guadalajara, Jalisco, January 2000. CD recording. Quindecim Recordings QP040. [Mexico]: Quindecim Recordings, 2000.
- In Concert with the University of Illinois Symphonic Band: The Begian Years Vol. 20. Alfred Reed, Praise Jerusalem; Johann Sebastian Bach (arr. ?)Prelude and Fugue in C Minor; Carlos Chávez (arr. Frank Erickson), Sinfonía india; Alexander Arutunian (arr.), Concerto for Trumpet; Gordon Jacob, Music for a Festival. University of Illinois Symphonic Band; Harry Begian, cond. CD recording (stereo). Mark Records 4890.
