= Ted Yamamori =

Japanese scholar of social studies

Tetsunao "Ted" Yamamori (Japanese: 山森鉄直) (born 1937 in Nagoya, Aichi Prefecture, Japan), is a Japanese scholar of social studies, author of over 20 books, and president emeritus of Food for the Hungry International, He was an international director for the Lausanne Committee for World Evangelization, a senior fellow at the Center for Religion and Civic Culture, University of Southern California, and an associate professor of "holistic mission" at Asbury Theological Seminary.

Yamamori was raised and educated within a Buddhist family in Nagoya. In 1956, while studying at the Nazan University, he emigrated to the United States to study at Texas Christian University and Duke University. He received a doctorate from Duke University in 1968. In 1969, Yamamori became an assistant professor at Milligan College, Northwest Christian University and Biola University, after which he began work with Food for the Hungry International; he became its president in 1984, retiring in 2001.

== Publications ==
- Church Growth in Japan （日本の教会成長）: A Study in the Development of the Eight Denominations. South Pasadena, CA: William Carey Library, 1974.
- The Hope Factor: Engaging the Church in the HIV/AIDS Crisis
