= Morty Corb =

American jazz musician (1917–1996)

- Born: Mortimer Gerald Corb; April 10, 1917; San Antonio, Texas, United States
- Died: January 13, 1996 (aged 78) Las Vegas, Nevada, United States
- Genre: Jazz
- Occupation: Jazz bass player
- Instrument: Double bass

Mortimer Gerald Corb (April 10, 1917 San Antonio — January 13, 1996 Las Vegas) was an American jazz double-bassist.

== Career ==
Corb had a long career as a jazz musician that began in 1946 and lasted until his death. He performed and recorded with:

- Gus Bivona
- Pete Fountain
- Ella Fitzgerald
- Nat King Cole
- Pearl Bailey
- Louis Armstrong
- Claude Thornhill
- Jess Stacy
- Kid Ory
- Jack Teagarden
- Benny Goodman
- Earle Spencer
- Ted Vesely
- Marvin Ash
- Ray Bauduc
- Freddie Slack
- Clyde Hurley
- Jerry Gray
- Maggie Jackson
- Pete Kelly
- Bob Crosby
- Ben Pollack
- Barney Kessel
- Frank Comstock
- Sam Donahue
- Claire Austin
- The Rampart Street Paraders
- George Van Eps
- Eddie Miller and His Blue Notes
- Dixieland Big Band All Stars
- Eartha Kitt
- Mel Lewis
- Jerry Colonna
- Earl Grant
- Red Nichols
- Matty Matlock
- Wild Bill Davison
- Muggsy Spanier
- Wally Rose
- Cappy Lewis
- Plas Johnson
- The Modernaires
- Gene Krupa
- Ralph Marterie
- Mannie Klein
- Paul Smith
- Johnny Best
- Louie Bellson
- Jonah Jones
- Glen Sponseller
- Beverly Jenkins
- Godfrey Hirsch
- Blue Angel Jazz Club
- Clancy Hayes
- Jazz Fusion
- Billy May
- Renzo Fraiese
- Heinie Beau
- Betty O'Hara
- Robert Hicks
- Bobby Gordon
- Roy Wiegand

Corb performed for four years on Bob Crosby's television program. He also did extended work as a session musician in studios, and though he did little of this after the 1950s, he appears on some 300 recordings. He worked in bands in Disneyland after moving to California in 1947, and recorded his only album as a leader, Strictly from Dixie, in 1957.

== Discography ==
As leader

1. Morty Corb and His Dixie All Stars, Strictly From Dixie OCLC 6697830
  John Best (trumpet), Moe Schneider (née Elmer Reuben Schneider; 1919–1970) (trombone), Heinie Beau (clarinet), Dave Harris (1913–2002) (tenor sax), Bobby Hammack (piano) George Van Eps (guitar), Morty Corb (bass), Jack Sperling (drums)
  Recorded in Los Angeles, April 1957
  1. "Bayou Blues"
  2. "Alexander's Ragtime Band"
  3. "Pennies From Heaven"
  4. "South"
  5. "Ramble In"
  6. "Honeysuckle Rose"
  7. "Sugarcane Strut"
  8. "Baby, Won't You Please Come Home?"
  9. "Indiana"
  10. "Savannah Shakedown"
  11. "Farewell Blues"

As sideman

- Molly Bee, Good Golly Ms. Molly (Granite, 1974)
- Bobby Darin, Two of a Kind (Atco, 1961)
- Lorne Greene, Lorne Greene's American West (RCA Victor, 1965)
- Lionel Richie, Lionel Richie (Motown, 1982)
- Frank Sinatra, In the Wee Small Hours (Capitol, 1955)
- Frank Sinatra, Trilogy: Past Present Future (Reprise, 1980)

== Bibliography ==
=== Inline references ===
- ASCAP. "Corb, Morty". The ASCAP Biographical Dictionary. New York: American Society of Composers, Authors and Publishers.
1. 3rd ed.. Compiled and edited by the Lynn Farnol Group, Inc. New York. 1966. p. 139 – via Internet Archive (ARChive of Contemporary Music). LCCN 66-20214; OCLC 598257.
2. 4th ed.. Compiled and edited by Jaques Cattell Press & R.R. Bowker Company. New York. 1984. p. 99 – via Internet Archive (ARChive of Contemporary Music). LCCN 80-65351; ISBN 0-8352-1283-1.
- Kernfeld, Barry Dean (born 1950) (ed.). "Corb, Morty". The New Grove Dictionary of Jazz.
1. 1st ed. Vol. 1 (of 2): "A–K". London: Macmillan Publishers. 1988. p. 247 – via Internet Archive. LCCN 87-25452; ISBN 0-3333-9846-7 (British Library); ISBN 0-9358-5939-X (Library of Congress); OCLC 16804283.
2. 1st ed. (reprinted as 1 Vol.). London: St. Martin's Press. 1994. p. 247 – via Internet Archive. LCCN 94-12667; ISBN 0-3336-3231-1 (British Library); ISBN 0-3121-1357-9 (Library of Congress); OCLC 30516743.
3. 2nd ed. Vol. 1 (of 3): "A–Fuzz". London: Macmillan Publishers. 2002. p. 515 – via Internet Archive. LCCN 2001-40794; ISBN 0-3336-9189-X (British Library); ISBN 1-5615-9284-6, 978-1-5615-9284-5 (Library of Congress); OCLC 232175971.
- Lord, Tom. "Corb, Morty". The Jazz Discography Online (As of May 21, 2025 → 214 indexed jazz sessions for Corb, from 1946–1996). West Vancouver: Lord Music Reference. ISSN 1700-439X; OCLC 48027258.
- New York Times (The) (January 17, 1996). "Morty Corb, 78, Jazz Bass Player" (AP). Vol. 145, no. 50309 (Late ed.). p. A17. ISSN 0362-4331.
1. Via EBSCOHost.
2. Via New York Times blog (archive url via Wayback Machine). Archived from the original on March 13, 2011.
3. Via New York Times blog.
4. Permalink – via Times Machine.

=== General reference ===
- Chadbourne, Eugene. "Morty Corb" at AllMusic. Retrieved May 21, 2025.
