= Toni Aubin =

American jazz vocalist (1927–1990)

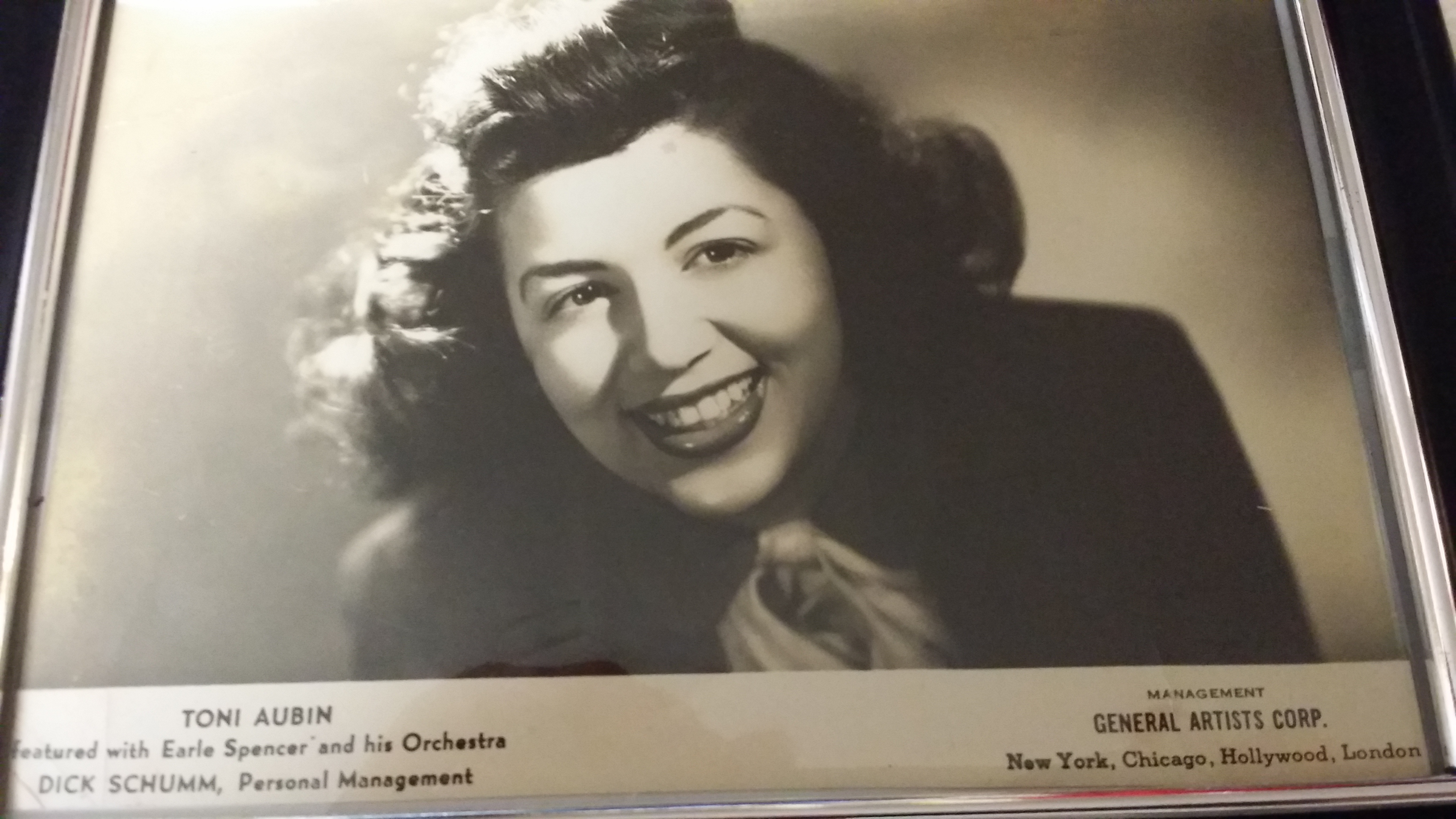

Background information
- Born: Maria Antoinette Rubio; September 22, 1927; Antioch, California, U.S.
- Died: February 10, 1990 (aged 62) San Joaquin, California
- Genres: Vocal jazz, swing
- Occupation: Singer
- Instrument: Vocals
- Years active: 1947–1950
- Label: Black & White
- Formerly of: Earle Spencer

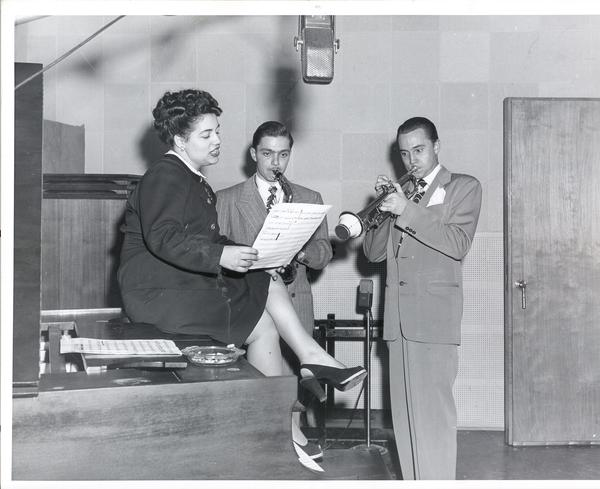
Toni Aubin (L) Art Pepper (R)

Toni Aubin (née Maria Antoinette Rubio; 22 September 1927 – 10 February 1990) was an American jazz vocalist who sang with big bands in the 1940s.

== Career ==
Aubin is most known as a featured singer with Earle Spencer and His Orchestra, with whom she began performing in 1949. Before that, from about 1946 to about 1947, she toured with the Louis Ohls Orchestra (Note: Louis Moritz Ohls, Jr. (1923–2004)) out of Arkadelphia.

In 1947, Aubin, while singing with the Louis Ohls Orchestra, shared a featured billing with Art Pepper, who, at the time, was arranger and saxophonist with the orchestra. Aubin had also sang with the Phil Carreon Big Band out of Los Angeles.

=== Pseudonym ===
Her stage name is that of the French composer Tony Aubin.

== Family ==
Both of Aubin's parents – Mike Rubio (né Miguel Rubio Peña; 1882–1933) and Frances Espinosa Rubio (1891–1985) – were born in the Andalusia region of southern Spain and immigrated to the United States in 1913. Aubin (Maria Antoinette Rubio) was married from 1947 to 1949 to Howard Ansley Phillips (1929–2010), who played baritone saxophone in the Spencer Orchestra from 1947 to 1949, and then settled in Las Vegas, where he would play for all of the major hotels for the next four plus decades. Ms Aubin (Rubio) gave birth to a girl in 1951, but gave her up for adoption (identity and whereabouts unknown). She also had a son, Ian Charles Phillips (born 30 Sep 1949 Pasadena, California), whom she raised.

In 1954, she married Jack Stanley Lanning (1923–2000), they had 4 more children, 2 sons and 2 daughters. They remained married until her death.

== Discography ==
1. Earle Spencer and His Orchestra (78 rpm)
  Recorded February 7, 1949, Hollywood, California
  1. "Box Lunch" ("At the Factory"), Paul Nelson (arranger)
  2. "Sunday afternoon,"
    - Toni Aubin (vocalist)
    - Seely, Blackburn (w&m)
    - Paul Nelson (arranger)
    audio on YouTube
  Black & White 875
  1. Matrix No.: BW 733-1
  2. Matrix No.: BW 732-1
  "Sunday Afternoon" has been re-issued in the following compilations:
  1. The Almost Forgotten Pioneer of Modern Big Band Jazz Earle Spencer And His Orchestra
    1988: IAJRC 41 (LP)
  2. The Almost Forgotten Pioneer of Modern Big Band Jazz Earle Spencer and His Orchestra
    2011: Essential Media Group LLC (CD)
  3. Earle Spencer and His New Band Sensation of the Year 1946 – Complete Black & White Recordings 1946–1949
    Fresh Sound (Sp) FSR 2501 (2 CDs)
    OCLC 19638188, 25051047, 982192542
