= Bagdad Supper Club =

Entertainment Venue in Texas

Coordinates: 32.7493°N 96.9706°W

The Bagdad Supper Club was a theater and entertainment venue located on north side of what then was U.S. Route 80, but now is Texas State Highway 180, east of Grand Prairie, Texas, at the corner of Bagdad Road and Main Street. It opened Thanksgiving Day 1928, eleven months before the Great Crash of 1929. It was an opulent palatial facility that offered dining, dancing, and music. The venue was featured in the 1947 comedy Juke Joint, starring Spencer Williams. J. Wiley Day was the inaugural managing director. The club was constructed by the Bagdad Enterprises, Inc., a Texas corporation, controlled by Eastern capital. The corporation was a subsidiary of a large Eastern company that confined itself to various theatrical lines. The architect was W. Scott Dunne (1886–1937), a well-known designer of theaters in Texas.

== Facilities ==
The building was a Moorish style, two-story building, clad in pinkish gray stucco. The exterior had rounded spires, influenced by old buildings of the Moors. It was distinctively oriental in all of its features. The building was built on 4.5 acres (1.8 ha). The building was set back three hundred feet from the road and featured a horseshoe driveway to the main entry. There was a walkway leading to the entry with a large fountain in the center. When the club opened, it had a parking lot for over three hundred automobiles. The interior featured a stage, dance floor, dining rooms, and lounging rooms. The dance floor was billed as the largest in the Southwest. The main dining room had a seating capacity of 450.

== Club managers and lessees ==
Managers

- 1929–1931: J. Wiley Day
- 1931: Jimmy Martin
- 1933: Hal Wortin
- 1946–1948: Ross Pastory (né Roscoe Joseph Pastory; 1916–1990) took over the club May 1946

Operators

- 1935: R.S. Sims and D.H. Taylor

Lessees

- 1931: Louis Estes
- 1949–1950: Lillian May Teague (née Helmston; 1901–1984) and her daughter, Marian Louise Teague (born 1929); and Robert Preston Bridges – Marian and Robert were later married

== Changes in use ==
Frank H. Newton, MD (1887–1977), and wife, Cosette Faust Newton, PhD (1889–1975), who at one time was Dean of Women as Southern Methodist University, acquired the club in 1945 and closed it in 1950. In September that year, All American News (Emanuel M. Glucksman, manager), a commercial film concern based in Chicago, leased the building as its southwest headquarters and used it for film and TV — commercial short subjects and trailers. They billed it as the largest sound stage east of Los Angeles. In 1953, the Newtons began renovating the facility as an art center, "bringing in a lifetime of art treasures from around the world." The Newton’s designed rooms devoted to the countries from whence their art objects were acquired.

== Destroyed by fire ==
The building burned to the ground on April 19, 1953 in what was called "the most spectacular fire in western Dallas County." Artwork valued at about $1 million (at that time) was lost in the fire, which included 45 paintings of the Hungarian artist Armand Grotz, a Gainsborough and a Van Dyck. Other valuable contents included furniture, Oriental furnishings — especially Japanese and Chinese — many tapestries, drapes, and scores of rugs termed priceless as they were made by hand.

The Newtons sold the 14-acre lot in 1956 for $125,000.

== Notable performers ==
- Phil Phillips and His 14 Californians (1929)
- Smith–MacDowell Orchestra (1929)
- Alvin Wahl and His Bagdad Colored Orchestra (1930)
- Vincent (Jelly) Parrino (1997–1990) and His Orchestra (1933)
- Gus Heilig and His Orchestra (1933 & 1934)
- Isham Jones (1935)
- Ben Bernie (1935)
- Jack Little (1935)
- Lou Harris and His Orchestra (1935)
- Ike Silver (1936)
- Glen Gray and His Casa Loma Band (1945)
- Durward Cline and His Orchestra (1945)
- Charlie Carl and His Orchestra (1948)
- Dude Ranch Buckaroos (1948)
- Earle Spencer and His Orchestra (1948)
- Chet Bundy (1949)
- Morrey Brennan and His Brennan–Aires (1950)

== See also ==
- List of supper clubs
