= Food for the Hungry =

Christian international development organization

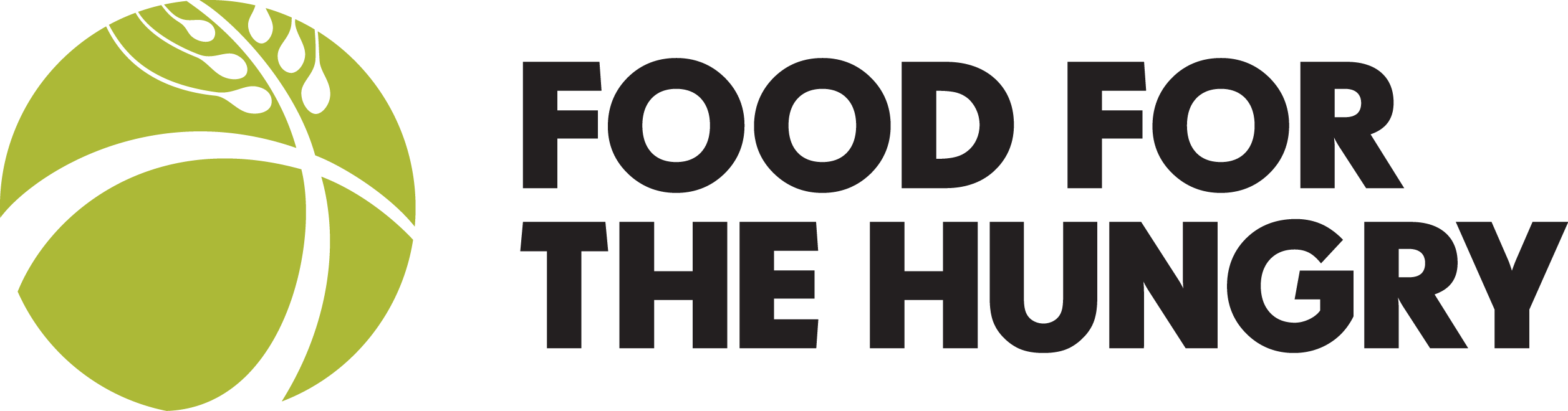
- Founded: 1971
- Founder: Larry Ward
- Type: International relief and development organization
- Purpose: Ending worldwide poverty
- Location(s): One Renaissance Square Phoenix, Arizona, United States
- Region served: 26 countries
- CEO: Mark Viso
- Website: www.fh.org

Food for the Hungry (also known as FH) is a Christian international relief, development, and advocacy organization. Food for the Hungry was founded in 1971 by Larry Ward. Food for the Hungry's stated mission for long-term development is to graduate communities of extreme poverty within 10–15 years. The organization also works in disaster relief and humanitarian response, including working with the Rohingya refugees in Bangladesh and Syrian refugees in Lebanon.

The organization's name "Food for the Hungry" was taken from Book of Psalms 146:7: "He upholds the cause of the oppressed and gives food to the hungry." Food for the Hungry is a charter member of the Evangelical Council for Financial Accountability, since February 1, 1980.

== History ==
Larry Ward founded the organization in 1971, with offices in Southern California. He moved the offices to Arizona in 1974. Early projects included helping refugees in war-torn Bangladesh, victims of the 1972 Nicaragua earthquake, rescuing Vietnamese "boat people" from the South China Sea, and helping hungry and needy people in Haiti and West Africa. The child sponsorship program was started in 1978. Hunger Corps, the people-sending division of Food for the Hungry, began in 1979.

Ward retired as president of both the U.S. fundraising office and the international implementation arm of Food for the Hungry in 1984. He was succeeded by Ted Yamamori. Yamamori retired in 2001, at which point two people were hired to replace him. Randall Hoag was appointed president of Food for the Hungry International, and Benjamin K. Homan was appointed president of Food for the Hungry/U.S.

Since 2006, FH has consolidated its U.S. and international operations. From 2014-2019, Gary Edmonds led as President/CEO. In the fall of 2018, Mike Meyers was named CEO of the organization, but stepped down in 2019 due to familial priorities. In early 2020, Mark Viso was announced as the new CEO and President.

=== Organizational structure ===
Food for the Hungry, Inc. (FH/US) was incorporated by Ward in the United States in 1971 and has existed continuously since then. Ward incorporated Food for the Hungry International (FHI) in Geneva, Switzerland, in 1980. FHI is made of national organizations (NOs) or affiliates.

FH/US became a supporting NO for FHI, along with like NOs in Japan (established in 1981), Canada (established in 1988), Sweden (established in 1988), Switzerland (established in 1988), Korea (established in 1989), United Kingdom (established in 1989) and a second organization in the United States, Korea-American Food for the Hungry International (established in 2002).

In 2006, FH restructured to align operations with NOs in Canada, Switzerland, Sweden, United Kingdom and United States as members of FH Association (FHA), which was registered in Switzerland in November 2006. Japan and Korea aligned as Food for the Hungry International Federation (FHF) and, though loosely affiliated as members of a larger FHI "family," operate separately from FHA.

FH is the umbrella for all FHA NOs and relief and development fields. Field work occurs primarily in Asia, Africa, Central America, South America and the Caribbean. NOs support this work by raising funds, supplying human resources and helping to design and evaluate field programs.

FH is governed by a unified Board of Directors providing direct oversight of FHA and FH/US and is led by board chair, Larry Jones.

== Biblical Holism ==
A biblical worldview is both a foundation and umbrella for FH's work. Food for the Hungry's Statement of Faith corresponds to the Statement of Faith of the National Association of Evangelicals (NAE). FH is not affiliated with any specific church or denomination.

== International work ==
=== Bangladesh ===
In 1972, FH began working in Bangladesh by distributing rice to the poor. Since then, FH has focused efforts on community development including livelihoods, micro-lending, health, education and disaster response resilience. Over the last 40 years, FH has partnered with Bangladeshi leaders and impoverished communities to create better living conditions.

Since more than 900,000 Rohingya people fled violence in Myanmar to seek refuge in Bangladesh since August 2017, FH/Bangladesh responded with Medical Teams International (MTI) to provide critical health care and community health facilities to Rohingya refugees. The partnership is funded in part with grants from UNHCR, UNICEF, and others to provide psychosocial support and medical care with a special focus on vulnerable mothers and children.

=== Bolivia ===
In 1978, FH began working in Bolivia providing humanitarian aid in the high plains between the Andes Mountains ridge assisting with effects of El Niño. Since then, FH has focused efforts on community development including livelihoods, health, and education. Since Bolivia is vulnerable to natural disasters, much of FH's work there has also been in emergency response and relief aid.

Currently, FH Bolivia is developing 30 projects through a match from the municipal governments in some rural areas. The investment in the Poroma area in 2018 was $1,206,191, which includes funds for water projects, refurbishing classrooms, and establishing irrigation systems. In the Cochabamba region, FH is partnering with municipalities in 19 projects with an investment of $2,271,125 to improve community access to water and irrigation systems.

=== Cambodia ===
In 1990, FH began working in Cambodia by providing relief and aid to those living in refugee camps during the civil war. In 1992, they started to partner with poor communities in the Kampot Province to improve living conditions, and later expanded into northern Cambodia. Now, FH has focused efforts on community development and other areas of need to improve living conditions.

Since 2016, FH Cambodia has been fostering partnerships with education agencies and local organizations recognized by the Cambodian Ministry of Education, Youth and Sports (MOEYS), to provide certification to preschool teachers after they finish modular early childhood teacher training courses. FH Cambodia has supported the training of more than 200 preschool teachers in accessing this opportunity to grow their skills and become equipped to teach children well.

=== Guatemala ===
FH started operating in Guatemala in 1976 in response to an earthquake that killed more than 23,000 people through the provision of clothing, food and plastic sheeting for temporary shelters. After officially establishing the office in 1981 to focus on child development, FH concentrated on meeting the needs of orphans and widows who had been affected by Guatemala's civil war. Today the work in Guatemala has expanded and deepened to focus on long-term community development, especially in the sector of child and infant health and nutrition.

In 2018, FH Guatemala used peer education through 104 Cascade Groups to spread messages to help reduce chronic malnutrition in 4,463 children. With the assistance of 1,269 volunteer mothers in Cascade Groups, new mothers have been taught how to breastfeed, recognize hunger and other cues from their babies, and how to properly respond to those cues for the health and development of their children.

=== Kenya ===
In 1976, FH began working in Kenya in response to a devastating drought by providing emergency supplies and relief in the Marsabit district. Since then, FH has focused efforts on long-term development work including livelihoods, sanitation, water, health, nutrition, child development, and HIV/AIDS prevention, treatment, care and support.

Alongside The Kenya Resilient Arid Land Partnership for Integrated Development project, which benefits 70,000 people through a partnership with the Millennium Water Alliance and support from USAID and the Swiss Development Corporation, FH Kenya is implementing a program to increase access to water for people and livestock by strengthening the capacity of public, civil society, community, and private sector institutions. The program is also undertaking initiatives to rebuild a healthy rangeland ecosystem, thereby ensuring that access to water is sufficient for multiple uses and is sustained over time. This project began in 2015 and will continue until 2020.

=== Rwanda ===
In 1994, FH began responding to the serious humanitarian crisis caused by the genocide. In the immediate years following, FH implemented emergency programs in tracing and unifying children with their families, agriculture interventions, emergency food and non-food item distributions and livelihoods support. Since 2001, FH has focused efforts on long-term development work including livelihoods, food and education.

In 2017, FH Rwanda supported more than 18,000 students with school supplies while over 35,000 students benefited from new and improved classrooms, desks, latrines, and water tanks. These resources are supporting education alongside training by FH Rwanda that prepares parents and teachers to monitor child attendance, learning, and teaching in schools and be active participants in children's education.

== Funding ==
FH is a charter member in good standing of the Evangelical Council for Financial Accountability (ECFA). Their audited financial statement for the fiscal year ending September 30, 2013 shows that 35 percent of funding came from the U.S. government, 62 percent from individuals, 3 percent from churches, businesses, and foundations. Of this funding, 83 percent was used on programs, 11 percent on fundraising and 6 percent on administrative costs.

=== Financial transparency ===
As charter members of the Evangelical Council for Financial Accountability, Food for the Hungry is in compliance with their Seven Standards of Responsible Stewardship.

In the past, the organization received GuideStar's Platinum Seal of Transparency, but that has since been downgraded due to a greater percentage of funding spent on administration and fundraising.

Food for the Hungry currently has a 3/4 star ranking on Charity Navigator, with an overall score of 87.34/100. While the organization scored a 100 for accountability and transparency, it scored only an 82.11/100 in the financial category, for having a relatively high amount of funds spent on fundraising and administration.

== See also ==
- Canadian Food for the Hungry
- Feed the Children
- Food for the Poor, Inc.
- Heart to Heart International
