= Frank William Erickson =

American composer (1923–1996)

Frank William Erickson (September 1, 1923 – October 21, 1996) was an American composer, conductor, arranger, writer, and trumpet player.

== Growing up ==
The son of Frank O.. Myrtle Erickson, Frank Erickson was born and raised in Spokane, Washington. He began his instrumental career at the age of eight, playing piano, and at age ten, playing trumpet. In high school, he wrote his first composition for the band, The Fall of Evening.

World War II

World War II began when Erickson was 16. He served with the United States Army Air Forces from 1942 to 1946, working as a weather forecaster and arranging music for several army bands.

Post World War II

After the war, Erickson worked as a jazz arranger, namely for Earle Spencer and His Orchestra (1946); and he played trumpet. He also studied composition with Mario Castelnuovo-Tedesco during this time period.

As he wrote the music and studied composition, Frank Erickson developed an interest in getting a degree and eventually enrolled at University of Southern California to further his studies in composition. While there, he began arranging half-time shows for the USC marching band. By the time he graduated, he had many published band compositions. His very first was called Little Suite for Band. He graduated from USC with a Bachelor of Music degree in 1950. The next year he went back to USC and graduated again with a Master of Music degree in 1951. His master thesis was about his own music.

Family

In 1953, Erickson married Mary Theresa McGrorty. They had three sons: William Erickson, Richard Erickson, Christian Erickson. Mary Theresa McGrorty died in 1975 at the age of 53 years. On August 15, 1981, he married Mary Ann Smith.

Career in higher education

Erickson lectured at University of California, Los Angeles, in 1958. He then became a professor of music at San Jose State University. The 1950s were prolific years for Erickson. His publications of works such as Balladair, Air for Band, Fantasy for Band, and Toccata for Band were quickly popular and led to wide notability in the concert band world. He is also widely known for his book Arranging for the Concert Band, namely by college music majors.

Motivation

At the time many pieces for the band were extremely difficult or not great pieces. Erickson loved his students so much he wrote a collection of pieces including Air for Band to expand the band repertoire.

Publishing career

For a number of years, Erickson worked in a publishing company, but years later he became an entrepreneur. He began his own publishing business called Frank Erickson Publications in 1995.

Affiliations

Erickson was a longtime member of the National Band Association, was elected to the Academy of Wind and Percussion Arts in 1986, was a member of American Society of Composers, Authors and Publishers, was a member of the Phi Mu Alpha Sinfonia, the Pi Kappa Lambda, the Phi Beta Mu, and the American Bandmasters Association.

Erickson Collection at Old Dominion University

In 2000, Erickson's widow, Mary Ann Smith, donated all of his compositions to Old Dominion University, which included over 400 works, 200 of which are originals.

- Frank Erickson Collection, Old Dominion University

== Selected works ==
Original compositions

- Balladair (1958); OCLC 28820661, 30076287, 860359047
- Blue Ridge Overture (1976)
- Air for Band (1956); OCLC 16753961, 859878100
- Fantasy for Band (1955); OCLC 456301386, 86105322
- Toccata for Band (1957); OCLC 39776207, 898311733
- The Fall of Evening (1940)
- Little Suite for Band (1951); OCLC 32338570, 456089157
- Allegro Animato (1991); OCLC 46914566
- English Folk-Song Fantasy
- Fanfare for a Festival
- Lyric Suite
- Lyric Episode (1991)
- Aria Cantabile (1990); OCLC 778804598
- Overture Jubiloso (1978); OCLC 69678754
- Irish Folk Song Suite (1952); OCLC 33146853
- Arietta And Rondo (1961); OCLC 41011254
- Rhythm of the Winds (1964)

Arrangements

- Barcarolle, by Jacques Offenbach (1964); OCLC 856528921
- Children's March, by Percy Grainger (1971); OCLC 220862777, 20873454, 20873454, OCLC 17891480
- Suite of Early Marches, Arr. by Frank William Erickson (1972);

== Selected audio ==
- "Air," North Texas Wind Symphony
- "Toccata"
- "Pillars of the Earth"
- "Overture Jubiloso," Tokyo Kosei Wind Orchestra
- "Black Canyon of the Gunnison" (1954) De Pauw University Band
