= Gary Morsch =

US physician, philanthropist, and author

Gary Morsch (born 1952) is an American physician, philanthropist and author. He is the founder of Heart to Heart International and One Heart Many Hands, and the founder/CEO of Docs Who Care.

== Heart to Heart International ==
In 1992, Morsch helped establish the organization, Heart to Heart International. He currently serves as a board member. This network of volunteers mobilizes resources to help address critical medical needs around the world. It has formed a partnership between pharmaceutical companies, corporate sponsors, civic and religious organizations, and individuals. Since its founding, HHI has delivered more than $1 billion of pharmaceuticals and medical supplies to over 150 countries.

== Docs Who Care ==
In 1993 Dr. Morsch left his private practice to devote more time to volunteering. He founded Docs Who Care, a for-profit organization providing healthcare to communities. The company partners with rural and critical access hospitals to provide Family Practice, Emergency Room and locum tenens staffing.

== Books written ==
- Ministry: It's Not Just for Ministers - Eddy Hall and Gary Morsch – Beacon Hill Press of Kansas City, 1993 (ISBN 978-0834115101) According to WorldCat, the book is located in 28 libraries
- The Lay Ministry Revolution - Eddy Hall and Gary Morsch – Grand Rapids, Mich. : Baker Books, 1995 (ISBN 0-8010-9173-X) According to WorldCat, the book is located in 72 libraries
- Heart and Soul: Awakening Your Passion to Serve - Gary Morsch and Dean Nelson – Beacon Hill Press of Kansas City, 1997 (ISBN 978-0801090059) According to WorldCat, the book is located in 34 libraries
- When's There's No Burning Bush – Eddy Hall and Gary Morsch – Baker Books 2004 (ISBN 0-8010-9173-X) According to WorldCat, the book is located in 45 libraries
- The Power of Serving Others: You Can Start Where You Are – Gary Morsch and Dean Nelson –San Francisco, CA : Berrett-Koehler, 2006–2015 (ISBN 978-0990677604) According to WorldCat, the book is located in 1440 libraries
- You'll Never Be The Same: Transform Your Life By Serving Others – Gary Morsch and Steve Weber – 2015 (ISBN 978-1943140404) According to WorldCat, the book is located in 866 libraries
