= Ultra-Lounge =

Compilation album series by various artists
- Released: 1996–2009
- Recorded: various years
- Genres: Lounge; exotica; mambo; cha-cha; bossa nova; space age pop
- Label: Capitol

Ultra-Lounge is a series of compilation CDs released by Capitol Records, featuring music predominantly from the 1950s and 1960s in genres such as exotica, space age pop, mambo, television theme songs, and lounge. Many of the volumes have since been made available for purchase via digital download.

Each CD featured detailed liner notes along with two related cocktail recipes, tips on how to serve drinks to guests, and often photographs of sculptures made out of bartender items and other objects.

The series started in 1996 during the swing revival, but as of 2009 the newer releases have been made available only for purchase in downloadable format from Amazon.com and iTunes.

Some volumes from the series managed to make the Billboard jazz top 10. Initial sales after the first few years reportedly reached over 600,000. In 1997, art directors Andy Engel and Tommy Steele won the Grammy Award for Best Recording Package for the packaging design of the Leopard Skin Sampler. The series would further be nominated for the Tiki Sampler and Vegas Baby! releases.

== Discography ==
Multi-Artist CD releases:

- Volume 1: Mondo Exotica (Mysterious Melodies & Tropical Tiki Tunes)
- Volume 2: Mambo Fever (Samba! Rhumba! Hot Cha-Cha-Cha!)
- Volume 3: Space Capades (Atomic-Age Audities and Hi-Fi Hi-Jinks!)
- Volume 4: Bachelor Pad Royale (Midnight Music for Cool Cats!)
- Volume 5: Wild, Cool & Swingin' (Finger Snappin' Vocals & Cocktails After Dark)
- Volume 6: Rhapsodesia (Music and Martinis For Lovers Only!)
- Volume 7: The Crime Scene (Spies, Thighs & Private Eyes!)
- Volume 8: Cocktail Capers (Mondo Space-Age Bachelor Pad A-Go-Go!)
- Volume 9: Cha-Cha de Amor (From Mamboland to Bossa Novaville)
- Volume 10: A Bachelor In Paris (Martinis Du Jour, with a French Twist!)
- Volume 11: Organs In Orbit (Super-cool Keyboards, Over-heated Hammonds)
- Volume 12: Saxophobia (A Horn-a-copia of Sax-ual Delights!)
- Volume 13: TV Town (Prime-Time Tunes From the Tube)
- Volume 14: Bossa Novaville (So Cool. So Sexy. So Rio. So Ipanema.)
- Volume 15: Wild, Cool & Swingin' Too! (More Snappy Vocals, More Las Vegas Style)
- Volume 16: Mondo Hollywood (Movie Madness From Tinsel Town)
- Volume 17: Bongoland (Spicy Latin Licks, Hot Voodoo Chicks)
- Volume 18: Bottoms Up! (Jet Set Cocktails With A Groovy Twist)
- On The Rocks, Part One (Rock 'n' Roll Hits Distilled for Easy Listening)
- On The Rocks, Part Two (Rock 'n' Roll Hits Distilled for Easy Listening)
- Christmas Cocktails, Part One (Hi-Fi Holiday Cheer from Santa's Pad)
- Christmas Cocktails, Part Two (Another Round of Cool Holiday Spirits)
- Christmas Cocktails, Part Three (Yule Tide Cheer Through the Year)
- Ultimate Christmas Cocktails, (a slipcased boxed set containing Christmas Cocktails Parts 1 - 3)
- Vegas Baby! (High Rolling, Sure Thing, Jackpot!)

Sampler CDs from the series itself:

- The Best of Christmas Cocktails
- Ultra-Lounge Sampler (Also known as the "Fuzzy Leopard" sampler)
- Tiki Sampler
- Welcome to the Ultra-Lounge Promo Sampler (Also known as the "White Coaster Music Sampler – Volume 1")
- Welcome to the Ultra-Lounge Promo Sampler (Also known as the "Black Coaster Music Sampler – Volume 2")
- Welcome to the Ultra-Lounge Promo Sampler (Also known as the "Green Coaster Music Sampler – Volume 3")

Artist/Composer-specific Compilations:

- Cocktails With Cole Porter
- The Romantic Moods of Jackie Gleason
- The Exotic Moods of Les Baxter
- The Exotic Sounds of Martin Denny
- Wild, Cool & Swingin' – Artist Series Vol. 1: Louis Prima and Keely Smith
- Wild, Cool & Swingin' – Artist Series Vol. 2: Bobby Darin
- Wild, Cool & Swingin' – Artist Series Vol. 3: Mrs. Miller
- Wild, Cool & Swingin' – Artist Series Vol. 4: Wayne Newton
- Wild, Cool & Swingin' – Artist Series Vol. 5: Julie London
- Wild, Cool & Swingin' – Artist Series Vol. 6: Sam Butera and The Witnesses

Download Only (mp3):

- Wild, Cool, & Swingin' 3! (More Snappy Vocals, More Las Vegas Style)
- Divas Las Vegas! (Smokin' Vocals from the Sirens of Sin City)
- Hey Bartender! (Happy Hour, Last Call)
- Big Apple Martini! (East Side, West Side, Uptown, Downtown)
- Ciao Bella! (Mondo Italiano)
- Jet Set Swingers! (Book Your Flight, Grab Your Passport)
- Mucho Gusto! (A Swingin' Fiesta South of the Border)
- Vegas Baby, Too! (Double Down, Hit the Jackpot)
- Nursery Rhythms! (The ABC's & 123's of Bachelor Pad Living)
- Christmas Cocktails, Vol. Four (Yule Tide Cheer Through the Year)

Volumes 7 onwards all have unlisted bonus tracks, mostly by Renzo Cesana.
