= Paul Nelson (composer) =

Paul Nelson (né Paul Eugene Nelson; 26 January 1929 Phoenix, Arizona – 11 April 2008 Providence, Rhode Island) was an American musician and composer. His compositions—in all genres except opera—have been performed on four continents.

== Growing up ==
Paul Nelson was born in Phoenix, Arizona on January 26, 1929. He attended public elementary school there, and graduated in 1947 as salutatorian from Phoenix Union High School.

== Career ==
After high school, Nelson studied music, first at Phoenix College, then at Arizona State University in Tempe in the late 1940s. By 1948, he had composed and arranged works for dance bands, including the Earle Spencer Orchestra, the Los Angeles City College Band.

Nelson served three years, from October 5, 1950, to October 4, 1953, in the U.S. Army, which included an assignment from October 1950 to June 1951 playing in an Army band and teaching the Band Training Unit at Fort Ord, California. From July 1951 to October 1953, Nelson was a staff arranger for the U.S. Military Academy at West Point. During his last year at West Point, he also was Choir Director at the West Point Post Chapel and played piano in one of Post dance bands.

After serving in the Army, Nelson studied with Paul Hindemith at Colorado College and earned a Bachelor of Arts degree there.

From about 1954 to about 1956, Nelson taught theory and composition at the University of Louisville School of Music.

Nelson earned a Master of Arts in spring 1957 from Harvard, where he studied with Walter Piston and Randall Thompson. Harvard awarded Nelson with a John Knowles Paine Fellowship in Music for a year at the University of Vienna, where he studied music and foreign languages, commencing Fall 1957.

A professional trumpet player, he also had sung in well over 20 choruses from Los Angeles to New York and Boston, as well as in Vienna and Paris, where he was a professional chorister in 1959-60. Nelson also, in the 1950s, studied music at Teachers College, Columbia University. In 1962, Nelson was awarded the Rome Prize from the American Academy in Rome, where he was a Fellow from 1960 to 1963. During his time there, other fellows in music included Marvin David Levy and Leslie Bassett

Then, in 1964, Nelson began teaching at Brown University in Providence, Rhode Island, where he was associate professor of music theory and composition until 1983. He remained in Providence until his death, collaborating with various people and groups including singing as a bass in the Rhode Island Civic Chorale and Orchestra (who have performed several of his works). He also taught privately in the area.

=== Death ===
Nelson died from congestive heart failure on April 11, 2008, at Rhode Island Hospital. He was survived by his wife, Elsa (née Elsa Maria Wohlmuth), whom he married in 1960 in London, England.

== Selected works ==
Nelson composed a half-hour-long work, Vox Aeterna Amoris, for mezzo-soprano solo and orchestra, which was premiered at Carnegie Hall, February 19, 1991, by Katherine Ciesinski and the National Orchestral Association. For the work, Nelson received an award of $5,000 as part of the seventh annual American Society of Composers, Authors and Publishers Rudolf Nissim Award. It was lauded by the Daily News as "easily the best work" on the program. Music critic Channing Gray described his 1990 "Cantata Psalmorum" in the Providence Journal-Bulletin the previous year as a "moving, eloquent score."

The Midtown Messenger in May 2004 again noted Nelson's life and work and his connection to his hometown, following his visit there to attend a performance of his composition "An Arizona Overture" in April 2004. The composition is a retitled movement from Nelson's "Two Contrasts for Orchestra," which was written as the 50th anniversary of Arizona's statehood approached, and was performed at Phoenix Union High School February 13, 1962, by the Phoenix Symphony. The program also featured violinist Zino Francescatti performing Mendelssohn's Violin Concerto.

== See also ==
- Paul Eugene Nelson Diary 1942–1944; OCLC 664265150
