= J. Durward Morsch =

Junior Durward Morsch (December 18, 1920 – August 2, 2015) was an American composer, prolific arranger, trombonist, and retired music educator who has worked and recorded professionally in a broad spectrum of genres, beginning with progressive big band jazz in the late 1940s and ending as a high school band director in Colorado. He was also the band director at Saguaro High School, in Scottsdale, Arizona.

== Career ==
Morsch was born in Iowa. Noted for his scoring for symphonic band works, Morsch has written over 400 arrangements, including 125 marching band scores, 110 symphonic scores, and 125 scores for film, dating from the 1930s to the present.

His son, Robert Stuart Morsch (1942–2009), was a music educator at the collegiate level, notably the director of bands at Western Illinois University.

Between 1946 and 1949, Morsch recorded on five studio sessions and two live broadcast as trombonist with the Earle Spencer Orchestra. Morsch is an alumnus of the University of Southern California and the University of Northern Colorado (1950s). He died in 2015 at the age of 94 in Colorado Springs.

== Selected arrangements and compositions ==
Arrangements

- Songs of a Wayfarer, by Mahler

Arranged for concert band by Morsch (1950)

- "Twelve clarinet quartets"

Theodore Presser Company (1963)
OCLC 2368450

- "Circus Maximus," by Ottorino Respighi

Arranged for concert band by Morsch

- "The Day the Earth Stood Still," by Bernard Herrmann

Arranged for concert band by Morsch

- Overture to "Silverado," by Bruce Broughton

Arranged for wind symphony by Morsch

- "The Decline and Fall of a Bridge," by John Dankworth

Arranged for wind symphony by Morsch

- "Little Bach Suites No. 1 & 2"

Arranged for 3 instruments (woodwind, strings, recorders, or mixed)
Theodore Presser Company (1964)
OCLC 150133981, 319491766, 723946725, OCLC 150175804, 150133989, 317753320, OCLC 799132679, 723946650

- "Contredanse," K. 510, Anhang C 13.02

"Minuet," K. 599, No. 1
By Mozart
Universal Music Group
Trio for flute, B♭ clarinet, and bassoon (or strings or recorders or mixed)
Theodore Presser Company (1964), Universal edition
OCLC 12005543, 34775352, 21514274, OCLC 495973674, 474077366, 724573662, OCLC 421907377, 799296224

- "Consolation No. 4," by Franz Liszt

For 3 B♭ clarinets, E♭ alto clarinet, B♭ bass clarinet, EE♭ contrabass clarinet, and BB♭ contrabass clarinet
OCLC 11859932

- "Section studies for flutes: auxiliary fingering, ear training and intonation, tone quality, blend and balance, technique"

By Nilo W. Hovey (Note: Nilo Wellington Hovey (1906–1986) was an influential guest conductor and clinician. Hovey was the director of the concert band at Butler University from 1944 to 1957. From 1957 to 1975, Hovey was the Educational Director for Selmer. He widely influenced educational pedagogy of school bands in North America. Hovey was a 1986 inductee of the National Band Association Hall of Fame of Distinguished Band Conductors) & Morsch
Belwin-Mills (1968)
OCLC 49915722

- "Little Handel suite"

Arranged for 3 instruments (woodwind, strings, recorders, or mixed)
Theodore Presser Company (1964)
OCLC 36239968, 65884717, 614535581, OCLC 724609824, 421889664

- "Erie Canal," by Gail Kubik

Arranged for wind symphony by Morsch

- "Concerto for Flute and Strings," by Jerome Moross

Arranged for wind ensemble by Morsch (2000)

- "Overture to the 7th Voyage of Sinbad," by Bernard Herrmann

Transcribed by Morsch

- "Passacaglia," by Christopher Palmer

Arranged for concert band by Morsch

- "Poem," by Griffes

Flute solo arranged by Morsch for wind ensemble

Compositions

- "A Christmas Suite For Chamber Winds"
- "Fortinbras March"
- "Nuages"
- "Pantomime of the Actors"
- "Sinfonia," for Chamber Woodwind Ensemble
- "Yagi Bushi"

== Professional affiliations ==
- Kappa Kappa Psi
