= Brookston, Texas =

Unincorporated community in Texas, US

Coordinates: 33°37′23″N 95°41′58″W

Brookston is an unincorporated community and census designated place (CDP) in Lamar County, Texas, United States. As of the 2020 census, Brookston had a population of 91.

== Education ==
The Chisum Independent School District serves area students.

The Texas Education Code specifies that all of Lamar County is in the service area of Paris Junior College.

== Demographics ==
Historical population
Census	Pop.	Note	%±
2020	91		—
U.S. Decennial Census; 1850–1900 1910; 1920 1930 1940; 1950 1960 1970; 1980 1990 2000; 2010 2020

Brookston first appeared as a census designated place in the 2020 U.S. census.

=== 2020 Census ===
Brookston CDP, Texas – Racial and ethnic composition Note: the US Census treats Hispanic/Latino as an ethnic category. This table excludes Latinos from the racial categories and assigns them to a separate category. Hispanics/Latinos may be of any race.
Race / Ethnicity (NH = Non-Hispanic)	Pop 2020	% 2020
White alone (NH)	67	73.63%
Black or African American alone (NH)	18	19.78%
Native American or Alaska Native alone (NH)	0	0.00%
Asian alone (NH)	0	0.00%
Native Hawaiian or Pacific Islander alone (NH)	0	0.00%
Other race alone (NH)	1	1.10%
Mixed race or Multiracial (NH)	4	4.40%
Hispanic or Latino (any race)	1	1.10%
Total	91	100.00%

== Notable people ==
- Bobby Hammack (1922–1990), jazz pianist and composer
- Lyndon Pete Patterson (1934–2017), politician who served in the Texas House from 1977–1999.
