= Canadian Food for the Hungry =

Canadian non-governmental organization

FH Canada
- Founded: 1994
- Founder: David Collins
- Type: Non-governmental organization
- Purpose: Poverty Alleviation
- Headquarters: Abbotsford, BC
- Location: National Office: #1-31741 Peardonville Road, Abbotsford, BC V2T 1L2 Canada
- Revenue: 12.6 million (2021)
- Employees: 28 in Canada
- Website: fhcanada.org
- Formerly called: Canadian Food for the Hungry International

FH Canada, formerly Canadian Food for the Hungry International, is part of the global Food for the Hungry (FH) network, a Christian international development agency dedicated to ending poverty worldwide. With partners and sponsors across Canada, FH walks alongside vulnerable communities throughout the developing world as they strive toward sustainability. Recognizing that each community faces unique challenges as well as advantages, FH is committed to an integrated, holistic approach to development including priorities such as agriculture, education, health, livelihoods, disaster risk reduction, and gender equality.

FH believes in facilitating innovative, long-term solutions and providing everyone an opportunity to join in the pursuit of a poverty-free world. FH Canada currently partners with communities in Bangladesh, Burundi, Cambodia, Ethiopia, Guatemala, Rwanda, and Uganda. Partnerships usually last around 10 years, at which point communities graduate as self-sufficient and often begin to help their neighbouring communities make the same transformation.

The organization also has a domestic mandate in Canada, serving to collaborate with other like-minded poverty alleviation organizations and offering worldview training workshops to equip Canadians to effectively respond to poverty both at home and abroad.

== Leadership ==
The international Food for the Hungry (FH) network was founded in 1971 by American Dr. Larry Ward. FH Canada (originally called "Canadian Food for the Hungry") was founded in 1994, and stands as an independent, registered charity in Canada governed by a volunteer Board of Directors, who oversee the organization's President and CEO. David Collins, a former pastor and missionary in Vietnam and the Philippines, was FH Canada's first president, holding the position until 2005. Ben Hoogendoorn, a businessman in the agricultural industry, joined FH Canada as a volunteer in 1997, then in 2001 began working with the organization as Director of International Operations. He became interim president in 2005, and officially accepted the role of President and CEO in 2006. In 2014, Ben passed the torch to business owner and philanthropist Bernie Willock, who led the organization for nearly three years. Shawn Plummer joined FH Canada in 2010 as the Director of Partnerships, and in 2017 Shawn was chosen to succeed as President and CEO. In 2023, Musu Taylor-Lewis was appointed as FH Canada's new President and CEO.

== Activities ==
FH Canada will often support communities in the following areas:

- Education
- Health and nutrition
- Agriculture
- Leadership development
- Income generation
- Environmental sustainability
- Gender equality

== International Medical Equipment Distribution (IMED) ==
In 2001, there was an addition of a regional office in Saskatchewan which runs the International Medical Equipment Distribution Program (IMED), a program that collects, refurbishes and ships used hospital equipment to hospitals that don't have access to sufficient equipment. IMED is also involved in the shipment of food and other supplies to relief situations when needed. In more recent years, the stream of medical equipment flowing from Canadian hospitals slows and shipping becomes prohibitively difficult. Simultaneously, an escalation in natural and man-made disasters reshapes the immediate needs of those trapped in poverty. In 2017, the IMED program was gently shut down and the warehouse sold. Perceiving another timely opportunity, and getting back to its roots and expertise as a humanitarian aid organization, FH Canada expanded its efforts to bring relief to hurting families. “In light of the unparalleled suffering we see today, we want to engage the world of relief with a mind toward long-term development strategies.” -Lindsay Brucks, former Director of IMED
