= Artie Shapiro =

American jazz musician

Arthur Shapiro (January 15, 1916 – March 24, 2003) was an American jazz bassist.

== Early life ==
Shapiro was born in Denver, Colorado, on January 15, 1916. He began on trumpet at age 13 and picked up bass at 18.

== Later life and career ==
In the late 1930s he played with Louis Prima, Wingy Manone, Joe Marsala, Eddie Condon, and Chu Berry. From 1938 to 1940 he played with Paul Whiteman, then returned to play with Marsala in addition to working with Bobby Hackett.

Shapiro moved to Hollywood in the early 1940s, playing with Jack Teagarden and Joe Sullivan before serving in the United States Army. In 1947 he returned to music, playing with Benny Goodman. He also accompanied singers such as Billie Holiday, Peggy Lee, Anita O'Day, Doris Day, Bing Crosby and Frank Sinatra. Shapiro's list of recording credits runs to more than 100 during his period of activity, stretching into the late 1960s. He died in Los Angeles on March 24, 2003.
