= Phil Carreón =

American musician (1923–2010)

- Born: Alonzo Lozano Carreón; May 6, 1923; Los Angeles, California
- Died: October 13, 2010 (aged 87) Boulder City, Nevada
- Genres: Swing music Big band Jazz; Latin jazz
- Occupation: Big Band Leader
- Instrument: Clarinet
- Labels: Philmos
- Formerly of: Phil Carreón and His Orchestra Ray Vasquez Vocalist and Trombonist

Phil Carreón (aka Phillip Lozano Carreón, Jr.; né Alonzo Carreón; May 6, 1923 – October 13, 2010) was an American big band leader based in Los Angeles who flourished from 1946 to 1952, retiring from music in 1952.

== Career ==
Carreón's orchestras performed stock arrangements from Count Basie and other popular swing bands and performed custom arrangements that distinguished his orchestra in both swing and Latin jazz. The Latin jazz was essentially American big band swing-jazz fused with Afro-Hispanic music — mambo and bolero, in particular. His band's Latin style became a popular trend with a few other notable Latin oriented Los Angeles big bands that influenced what became salsa. Carreón's band performed in ballrooms around Los Angeles (including the Avadon Ballroom), the rest of the West Coast, the Southwest — and as far as Texas (including Antonio Valencia's famous Patio Andatuz in San Antonio) and Louisiana — in the 1950s. Several major jazz musicians, early in their careers, performed with his band, including a group of saxophonists that included Teddy Edwards, Herb Geller, Warne Marsh, and Herbie Steward. The legendary composer, Lennie Niehaus, who went on to write for Basie and the film industry, got his first professional job out of high school as a composer and saxophonist with Carreón.

Carreón was a clarinet player; but as a band leader, he did not play an instrument. Notwithstanding the extant recordings of Carreón's popular music, his legacy as the leader of an outstanding swing big band is chronicled but not audibly enshrined due either an absence of jazz discography or an absence of jazz recording sessions. Yet, a consensus of published acclaim by notable band alumni, entertainment peers, musicologists, and historians is that the swing aspect of Carreón's big band was excellent.

According to a 1998 interview with Don Tosti (1923–2004), (Note: Don Tosti, bassist and popular big band leader in Los Angeles: Don Tosti and the Pachuco Boogie Boys) early in his career, Carreón worked for a Mexican-American jukebox industry entrepreneur Frank Navarro (né Francisco B. Navarro; 1895–1964), owner of Navarro Music Company, driving around Los Angeles replacing older albums with recent hit records.

In 1951, Carreón signed a professional management contract with Reg Marshall Agency, (Note: Reg Marshall Agency — namesake of Reginald D. Marshall (1903–1972). In 1951, when he signed Carreón, he was also handling the booking for King Perry, and Anna Mae Winburn) a talent management firm based in Hollywood, and went on tour in Colorado, New Mexico, and Arizona. In that same year, his orchestra members were composed entirely of Mexican Americans, according to an article in the Prensa, a San Antonio Spanish language newspaper. In the early 1950s, his orchestra was aired on the Mutual Broadcasting System.

== Service in the U.S. Armed Forces ==
During World War II, Carreón enlisted in the United States Army and received his basic training at the Infantry Replacement Training Center, Camp Roberts, California, then volunteered for the ski troops. As a member of the Army Mountain Infantry regiment, Carreón was a Browning automatic rifleman in the 1943 U.S. assault on and capture of Japanese occupied Kiska, in the Aleutian Islands. After returning from the Aleutian Islands, Carreón was stationed at Camp Hale, Colorado, with the ski troops, where he also played clarinet in the United States Army 1st Combat Infantry Band and several small, informal, dance bands. Pvt. Carreón wore the Asiatic-Pacific and American Defense ribbons, one campaign star, and was awarded the Expert Infantryman Badge.

== Featured performers, arrangers, composers ==
Vocalists

- Vikki Carr (born 1940), featured vocalist
- Toni Aubin (1927–1990), featured vocalist
- Ray Vasquez (1924–2019), trombonist and featured vocalist (Note: Ray Vasquez, trombonist and vocalist, cousin of Anthony Ortega (born 1928), the saxophonist)
- Rudy Macias (1925–2012), vocalist, born in El Paso (Note: Rudy Macias (né Julian Ramirez Mojarro; 1925–2012), born in El Paso (see tribute))
- Frances Irvin (1929–2003), vocalist, born in Fort Worth, raised in Amarillo (Note: Francis Irvin (1929–2003), female vocalist; born in Fort Worth, raised in Amarillo, died in Burbank; sang with Carreón and Tommy Dorsey; married Gene Cipriano (Eugene R. Cipriano), a Hollywood-based studio woodwind player)

Instrumentalists

- Lennie Niehaus (1929–2020), lead alto, composer, arranger
- Herb Geller (1928–2013), saxophonist
- Herbie Steward (1926–2003), tenor saxophonist
- Teddy Edwards (1924–2003), tenor saxophonist, composer, arranger
- Warne Marsh (1927–1987), tenor saxophonist
- Billy Byers (1927–1996), trombonist
- Gerald Wilson (1918–2014), trumpeter

== Growing up ==
Carreón attended Roosevelt High School in Los Angeles. While a student, he was the leader of the ROTC Band and also led his own group, Phil Carreón and His Orchestra, a 15-piece orchestra. He had studied clarinet since age 11.

== Selected discography ==
=== Philmos Records, Philmos Recording Co., Los Angeles ===
- "Mambopolis," by Ramón Márquez; OCLC 82508201, 011-A; mx 11A-3 (10-in, 78-rpm)
- "El Tribilin" (mambo), by Ramón Márquez; OCLC 80002056, 011-B; mx 11B-3 (10-in, 78-rpm)
- "Pepe Tostón" (mambo), by José Márquez; OCLC 83501393, 013-A; mx M2 13A-3 (10-in, 78-rpm)
- "Bobby's Mambo," by Reuben (Rubin) McFall (Note: Reuben McFall was a trumpet player) OCLC 79121398 Phil Carreon and His Orchestra 013-B; Re-release: Various artists Tropical Extravaganza Vol. 2
- "Lo Que El Viento Se Llevó" (bolero) Phil Carreon y Su Orquesta Rudy Macias, vocalist 039-A (10-in, 78-rpm)
- "Delilah" (mambo) Phil Carreon y Su Orquesta Rudy Macias, vocalist 039-B (10-in, 78-rpm)
- "I'll Love No More," Dick Lane and Benny Weisman Phil Carreon and His Orchestra Ray Vasquez, vocalist 035-A (10-in, 78-rpm)
- "Mambo, How High the Moon," Morgan Lewis and Nancy Hamilton, Phil Carreon and His Orchestra Ray Vasquez, vocalist 035-B (10-in, 78-rpm)
- "Que Rico El Mambo" (mambo), Perez Prado, Phil Carreon and His Orchestra 012-A (10-in, 78-rpm)
- "Mambo No. 5" (mambo), Perez Prado, Phil Carreon and His Orchestra 012-B (10-in, 78-rpm)
- "Porque Niegas Que Me Quieres" (bolero) Words by Soledad A. Chía, music by Carlos Chía (Note: Porque Niegas Que Me Quieres, – words Soledad A. Chía, music Carlos Chía (né Charles Leopold Chía; 1913–1989); Copyright August 9, 1949, EU175589; (EU = Class E, unpublished); Vol. 3, Part 5B, July–December 1949, Nos. 2 (1949), pg. 354) (Note: Charles Leopold Chía (1913–1989)) Phil Carreon y Su Orquesta Johnny Rico, Vocals 002-A (10-in, 78-rpm)
- "Ilusion Traicionera" (bolero) Words by Soledad A. Chía, music by Carlos Chía (Note: Ilusion Traicionera, – words Soledad A. Chía, music Carlos Chía (né Charles Leopold Chía; 1913–1989); Copyright August 9, 1949, EU175588; (EU = Class E, unpublished); Vol. 3, Part 5B, July–December 1949, Nos. 2 (1949), pg. 290) Phil Carreon y Su Orquesta Johnny Rico, Vocals 002-B (10-in, 78-rpm)
- "Contigo A La Distancia" (bolero) Phil Carreon y Su Orquesta Rudy Macias, Vocals 049-A (10-in, 78-rpm)
- "Mucho Corazon" (bolero) Phil Carreon y Su Orquesta Rudy Macias, Vocals 049-B (10-in, 78-rpm)
- "Mamboleco" (mambo), Ramón Márquez, Leoncio Diaz, Phil Carreon y Su Orquesta 017-A (10-in, 78-rpm)
- "La Canica" (guaracha), Hermina Kenny, Phil Carreon y Su Orquesta 017-B (10-in, 78-rpm)

=== Latino Internacional Inc., Los Angeles ===
- "Rico, Caliente Y Sabroso" (mambo)

Phil Carreon y Su Orquesta
108-A (10-in, 78-rpm)

- "La Guira" (mambo)

Phil Carreon y Su Orquesta (mambo)
Rudy Marcias, vocals
108-B (10-in, 78-rpm)

- "Mambo No. 8" (mambo), Perez Prado

Phil Carreon y Su Orquesta (mambo)
110-A (45-rpm)

=== Whimsy, Ltd., 6118 Selma Ave., Hollywood ===
- "How Strange"

Phil Carreon and His Orchestra
Johnny Clark, (Note: Johnny Clark (pseudonym of John Richard Ames Coonley; 1916–1967) was married to Dian Manners (née Dian McDonough; 1906–1985). Johnny Clark was a songwriter and singer, Dian was an actress who had minor roles in film, including an uncredited role as Louise in the 1936 film, It Couldn't Have Happened – But It Did. Clark and Manners were admitted to ASCAP in 1957 Dian Manners talking on the telephone, Los Angeles, 1936, Los Angeles Times Photographic Archive. Department of Special Collections, Charles E. Young Research Library, UCLA) vocalist
Whimsy 243

- "Yuletide"

Phil Carreon and His Orchestra
Johnny Clark, vocalist
Whimsy 243

- "I Know My Limitations"

Phil Carreon and His Orchestra
Johnny Clark, vocalist
Whimsy 244

- "L.C. Jump"

Whimsy 244

- "I Close My Eyes"

Ray Vasquez, vocalist
Whimsy 245

- "No Comment!"

Johnny Clark, vocalist
Whimsy 245

=== Other ===
- "I'm In the Mood for Love"

Melodias Rancheras (released 1951)
Phil Carreon
Notes

- Philmos Records was founded in 1950 in Los Angeles by Ray Ramos
- Whimsy was the label of Whimsy, Ltd., Hollywood
- Johnny Clark (born 1916) and Dian Manners dba as Whimsy, Ltd.
- Whimsy label dating guide:

241 – May 1947
243 – June 1947
821 – September 1947

- In 1951, Whimsy, Ltd., called itself a public relations firm

== Various names of Carreón's orchestras ==
- Phil Carreon and His Orchestra
- Phil Carreon and His Philmos Recording Orchestra
- Phil Carreon and His Popular Latin American Orchestra
- Phil Carreon and His Famous 15 Piece Band
- Phil Carreón y Su Orquesta

== Family ==
Parents

Carreón's parents:

- Filipe Herrera Carreón (1890–1965), was born in Chihuahua, Mexico
- Guadalupe ("Lupe") Lozano (1894–1956), who was born in Montemorelos, Mexico

They became naturalized United States citizens.

Siblings

Phil Carreon had six siblings, two brothers and four sisters.

Marriage

Carreón married Xina Yvonne (née Zinn; born 1926) around 1949. They had four children: (i) Daniel Thomas Carreon (1950–2013) survived by wife Judy Harward and 8 children, Jennifer, Kristen, Daniel, John Paul, Rebecca, Bethany, Sarah and Michaela; (ii) Phyllis Carreon (born 1955), who was first married to Vincent Frank Cesare and is currently married to Raymond Alan Taie since 1982 with daughter Kelly Kristine (Pfeiffer); (iii) Patrick Anthony Carreon (born 1958) currently married to Tamerin Kelly with daughter Mary Katherine, and (iv) Yvonne Susanne Carreon (born 1960), married to Karl Alan Schoneman, divorced in 2006 with 4 children Ted, Alexandria, Nicola and Phillip.

== Notes and references ==
Notes

Original copyrights
Catalog of Copyright Entries, Part 3 Musical Compositions, Third Series, Library of Congress, Copyright Office

Citations
