= Boyd Raeburn =

American jazz bandleader and saxophonist (1913–1966)

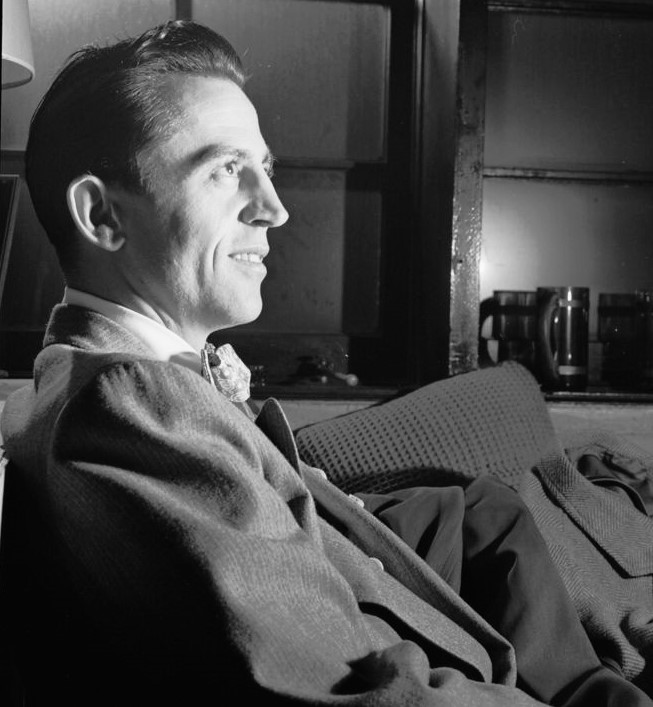
- Boyd Raeburn, c. June 1946; Photograph by William P. Gottlieb

Background information
- Born: Boyd Albert Raeburn; October 27, 1913; Faith, South Dakota, U.S.
- Died: 2 August 1966 (aged 52) Lafayette, Louisiana, U.S.
- Genre: Jazz
- Occupation: Musician
- Instrument: Saxophone

Boyd Albert Raeburn (October 27, 1913 – August 2, 1966) was an American jazz bandleader and bass saxophonist.

== Career ==
He was born in Faith, South Dakota, United States. Raeburn attended the University of Chicago, where he led a campus band. He gained his earliest experience as a commercial bandleader at Chicago's World Fair (1933–1934). For the rest of the decade, he worked in dance bands, sometimes leading them.

In the next decade, the group passed through swing before becoming identified with the bop school. His later big band, which was active c. 1944-1947, performed arrangements that were often comparable to those used by Woody Herman and the "progressive jazz" of Stan Kenton during the same period. The compositions arranged by George Handy were the most contemporary, utilizing dissonance somewhat in the manner of Igor Stravinsky. Johnny Richards joined in 1947, following Handy and stayed for a year writing 50 compositions.

== Later life and death ==
Raeburn's second wife was the singer Ginny Powell, for whom he wrote "Rip Van Winkle". The couple married in 1946, and had two children. As well as singing with her husband's group, Powell also sang with Harry James and Gene Krupa. Raeburn left music in the mid-1950s. Powell died in Nassau in the Bahamas, where the couple had moved, in 1959. He settled in New Orleans and ran a furniture store.

Raeburn died from a heart attack in 1966 in Lafayette, Louisiana, aged 52. Boyd Raeburn's first wife was Lorraine Anderson, with whom he had one child; the union ended in divorce. His son with Powell, Bruce Boyd Raeburn of New Orleans, was the curator of the William Ransom Hogan Archive of New Orleans Jazz at Tulane University in New Orleans until December 2017.

== Discography ==
- Boyd Meets Stravinski (Savoy, 1955)
- Man with the Horns (Savoy, 1955)
- Dance Spectacular (Columbia, 1956)
- Fraternity Rush (Columbia, 1957)
- On the Air Vol. 1 (Hep, 1974)
- Rhythms by Raeburn (Aircheck, 1977)
- Experiments in Big Band Jazz 1945 (Musicraft, 1980)
