= 1962 in jazz =

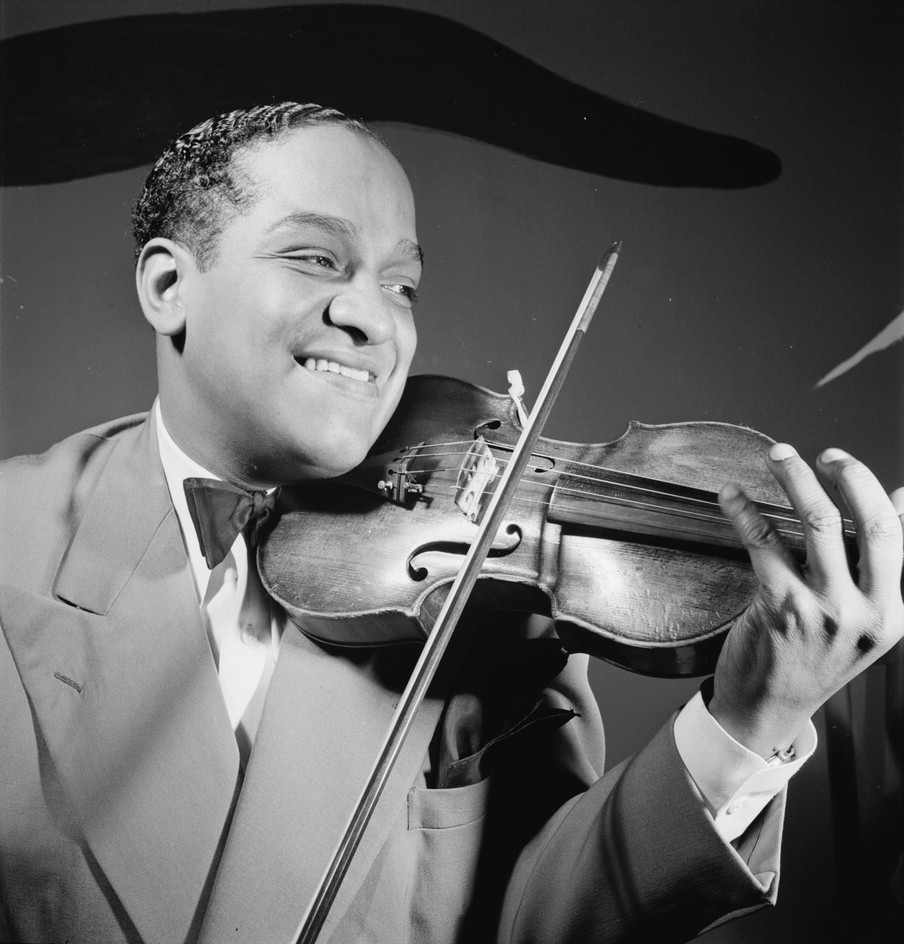
- Violinist Eddie South died in 1962
- Decade: 1960s in jazz
- Music: 1962 in music
- Standards: List of post-1950 jazz standards
- See also: 1961 in jazz – 1963 in jazz

This is a timeline documenting events of Jazz in the year 1962.

== Events ==
=== May ===
- 29 – The 4th Annual Grammy Awards were held at Beverly Hilton Hotel in Los Angeles.
- Best Jazz Performance – Soloist or Small Group (Instrumental)
  - André Previn for André Previn Plays Harold Arlen
- Best Jazz Performance – Large Group (Instrumental)
  - Stan Kenton for Kenton's West Side Story
- Best Original Jazz Composition
  - Galt MacDermot (composer) for "African Waltz" performed by Cannonball Adderley

=== July ===
- 6 – The 7th Newport Jazz Festival started in Newport, Rhode Island (July 6 – 8).

=== Unknown dates ===
- Several recordings are made at the Lighthouse Café in Hermosa Beach, California: Curtis Amy, Tippin' on Through; The Jazz Crusaders, The Jazz Crusaders at the Lighthouse.

== Album releases ==
- Art Blakey and The Afro-Drum Ensemble: The African Beat
- Bill Evans and Jim Hall: Undercurrent
- Dexter Gordon: Go
- Freddie Hubbard: Ready for Freddie
- Milt Jackson
  - "Big Bags
  - "Bags Meets Wes!" (With Wes Montgomery)
  - "Invitation"
  - "Statements"
- Stan Kenton
  - Adventures In Jazz
  - Adventures in Time
  - Sophisticated Approach
- Jackie McLean
  - Bluesnik
  - A Fickle Sonance
- Hugh Masekela: Trumpet Africaine
- Charles Mingus
  - Epitaph
  - Tijuana Moods
- Modern Jazz Quartet
  - The Comedy
  - "Lonely Woman"
- Wes Montgomery: Full House
- Oscar Peterson
  - Affinity
  - Bursting Out with the All-Star Big Band!
  - West Side Story
- André Previn and Doris Day: Duet
- Sonny Rollins: The Bridge
- George Russell: The Stratus Seekers
- Carol Sloane: Out of the Blue
- Nina Simone: Nina Simone Sings Ellington
- Cecil Taylor: Nefertiti
- Jimmy Woods: Awakening!!

== Deaths ==
January

- 17 – Claude Jones, American trombonist (born 1901).

February

- 5 – Doug Watkins, American upright bassist (born 1934).
- 11 – Leo Parker, American baritone saxophonist (born 1925).

March

- 24 – Jean Goldkette, American pianist and bandleader (born 1893).

April

- 13 – John Graas, American French horn player, composer, and arranger (born 1917).
- 25 – Eddie South, American jazz violinist (born 1904).

May

- 8 – Donald Lambert, American stride pianist (born 1904).

July

- 12 – Roger Wolfe Kahn, American musician, composer, and bandleader (born 1907).
- 28 – Eddie Costa, American pianist (born 1930).

August

- 11 – Israel Crosby, American upright bassist (born 1919).

December

- 13 – Harry Barris, American singer, composer, and pianist (born 1905).

== Births ==
January

- 7 – Tor Haugerud, Norwegian drummer, Transjoik.
- 11 – Steve Oliver, American guitarist.
- 22 – Jimmy Herring, American guitarist.

February

- 2 – Tapani Rinne, Finnish saxophonist, composer and record producer.
- 4 – Jude Abbott, English vocalist and trumpeter.
- 25 – Snorre Bjerck, Norwegian percussionist.
- 28 – Caroline Henderson, Danish–Swedish singer.

March

- 13 – Terence Blanchard, American trumpeter, bandleader, composer, and arranger.
- 24 – Renee Rosnes, American pianist, composer and arranger.

April

- 2 – Thomas Blachman, Danish drummer and composer.
- 3 – Dennis Mackrel, American drummer, composer, and arranger.
- 9 – Arthur Maia, Brazilian jazz and samba bassist and composer (died 2018).
- 27 – Kenn Smith, American guitarist, bassist, composer, educator and journalist

May

- 9 – Jon Klette, Norwegian saxophonist (died 2016).
- 11 – Robert Balzar, Czech upright bassist and composer.
- 12 – Aydin Esen, Turkish pianist, keyboarder, and electronics player.
- 18 – Huw Warren, Welsh pianist and composer.
- 20
  - Cynthia Sayer, American banjoist and vocalist.
  - Ralph Peterson Jr., American drummer and bandleader.
- 30 – Darrell Grant, American pianist, vocalist, composer, and educator.

June

- 2 – Ian Shaw, Welsh singer.
- 4 – Winard Harper, American drummer.
- 16 – Femi Kuti, Nigerian singer, songwriter and saxophonist.
- 23 – Andrej Šeban, Slovak guitarist.

July

- 12 – Mike Walker, English guitarist.
- 21 – Lee Aaron, Canadian singer.
- 24 – Marion Meadows, American soprano saxophonist.
- 29 – Lisa Ono, Japanese-Brazilian bossa nova singer and guitarist.

August

- 2 – Billy Kilson, American drummer.
- 9 – Edsel Gomez, Puerto Rican pianist.
- 10 – Julia Fordham, British singer-songwriter.
- 11 – Mike Jones, American pianist.
- 19 – Angelo Debarre, French Romani guitarist.
- 31 – Joanna Connor, American singer, songwriter and guitarist.

September

- 7
  - Paul Tobey, Canadian pianist.
  - Rob Bargad, American pianist, organist, songwriter, arranger, educator, and producer.
- 8
  - Cecilia Coleman, American pianist, composer, and bandleader.
  - Glauco Venier, Italian pianist and composer.
- 25 – Craig Handy, American tenor saxophonist.

October

- 1 – Fred Lonberg-Holm, American cellist.
- 12 – Chris Botti, American trumpeter and composer.
- 19 – Bendik Hofseth, Norwegian saxophonist and singer.
- 20 – Dado Moroni, Italian pianist and composer.

November

- 11 – James Morrison, Australian trumpeter and multi-instrumentalist.
- 12 – Eddie Benitez, Puerto Rican guitarist.
- 27 – Euge Groove, American saxophonist.
- 28 – Ronny Jordan, American guitarist (died 2014).

December

- 8
  - Olaf Kamfjord, Norwegian bassist.
  - Tim Armacost, American saxophonist.
- 9 – Mia Žnidarič, Slovenian singer.
- 15 – Nils Einar Vinjor, Norwegian guitarist and composer.
- 28
  - Brian Kellock, Scottish pianist
  - Michel Petrucciani, French pianist (died 1999).
  - Rachel Z, American pianist and keyboardist.

Unknown date

- Christina von Bülow, Danish saxophonist and flautist.
- Juliet Roberts, British singer songwriter.
- Karoline Höfler, German bandleader and bassist.
- Per-Ola Gadd, Swedish upright bassist.
- Thomas Agergaard, Danish saxophonist, flautist, and composer.
- Tony Buck, Australian drummer and percussionist.

== See also ==
- 1960s in jazz
- List of years in jazz
- 1962 in music

== Bibliography ==
- The New Real Book, Volume I. Sher Music. 1988. ISBN 0-9614701-4-3.
- The New Real Book, Volume II. Sher Music. 1991. ISBN 0-9614701-7-8.
- The New Real Book, Volume III. Sher Music. 1995. ISBN 1-883217-30-X.
- The Real Book, Volume I (6th ed.). Hal Leonard. 2004. ISBN 0-634-06038-4.
- The Real Book, Volume II (2nd ed.). Hal Leonard. 2007. ISBN 978-1-4234-2452-9.
- The Real Book, Volume III (2nd ed.). Hal Leonard. 2006. ISBN 0-634-06136-4.
- The Real Jazz Book. Warner Bros. ISBN 978-91-85041-36-7.
- The Real Vocal Book, Volume I. Hal Leonard. 2006. ISBN 0-634-06080-5.
