= Gabe Baltazar =

American jazz saxophonist and woodwind doubler (1929–2022)

- Gabe Baltazar, c. 1962

Background information
- Also known as: Gabe Baltazar
- Born: Gabriel Ruiz Hiroshi Baltazar Jr. November 1, 1929; Hilo, Territory of Hawaii, U.S.
- Origin: United States
- Died: June 12, 2022 (aged 92) Hilo, Hawaii, U.S.
- Genres: Jazz; Pop
- Occupations: Musician, conductor, music director
- Instruments: Saxophones; Clarinets; Flutes; Piano; Oboe
- Years active: 1948–2022
- Labels: Capitol; Contemporary; Creative World
- Website
- Military service
- Allegiance: United States
- Branch: United States Army
- Service years: 1950–1954
- Unit: 356th Army Band (Fort Belvoir)

Gabriel Ruiz Hiroshi Baltazar Jr. (November 1, 1929 – June 12, 2022) was an American jazz alto saxophonist and woodwind doubler.

== Background and early years ==
Gabriel Ruiz Hiroshi Baltazar Jr. was born in Hilo, Hawaii on November 1, 1929. His mother, born Chiyoko Haraga on a Hawaii sugarcane plantation, was the daughter of Japanese immigrants who came to Hawaii to work on the plantations around 1900. His father, Gabriel Baltazar Sr., was born in Manila in 1906 and came to the United States to work as a musician in the mid-1920s. Gabe started playing reed instruments while his younger brother Norman Baltazar took up the trumpet.

== Musical education, meeting with Charlie Parker, move to Los Angeles ==
Gabe Baltazar was first playing music at the age of eleven when he was started on the E♭ clarinet, later he would switch to alto saxophone. There were numerous big bands stationed at Hickam Field during this time (World War II) and Baltazar got to hear Artie Shaw, Sam Donahue, and Claude Thornhill. Baltazar's main influences growing up were Benny Carter, Lester Young, Coleman Hawkins, Willie Smith and Johnny Hodges. By age 16 (1946) he had already been playing professionally for two years and was first introduced to Charlie Parker's playing by jazz trombonist Frank Rehak.

In 1945, Baltazar was the first recipient of a musical scholarship fund at Punahou School of Music under the auspices of the Filipino Art Lovers' Club.

After his graduation from McKinley High School in 1948, he went to study at Interlochen for eight weeks in the summer. Gabe Baltazar then moved to the U.S. mainland from Hawaii to attend Peabody Conservatory in Baltimore, Maryland for two years. Baltazar notes his meeting with Charlie Parker during a visit to New York in 1948 as one of the biggest musical inspirations of his life. He questioned Parker extensively during this meeting and it would become an inspiration for his own playing to closely resemble that of the famed alto saxophonist.

Baltazar was drafted when the Korean War started and served in the United States armed forces from 1950 through 1954 at Fort Belvoir in Washington D.C. After that he moved back to Hawaii and played with the Royal Hawaiian Band for two years later moving to Los Angeles playing and recording with Paul Togawa in the late 1950s. Baltazar first attended Los Angeles City College on the G.I. bill and then later transferred in 1958 to Los Angeles State College following in the footsteps of the alto saxist and Stan Kenton alum Lennie Niehaus. He eventually completed a B.A. in Music in February 1967 at Los Angeles State College. While there he was initiated into the Phi Mu Alpha Sinfonia fraternity on December 1, 1957. Baltazar replaced Niehaus in 1960 with Kenton after he was heard on a concert by the bandleader during a Los Angeles State College concert; Baltazar was working for the Russ Morgan orchestra at the time.

== Los Angeles and the Stan Kenton Orchestra ==
Baltazar spent a brief unrecorded period in 1959–60 with the Lighthouse All-Stars. He was heard and worked for numerous players and contractors in the Los Angeles area by this time, eventually being offered the lead alto sax chair with Stan Kenton. From 1960 to 1965, he gained international recognition as a world-class jazz artist with Kenton, recording on 17 critically acclaimed LP's to include backing singers such as Nat King Cole, Jean Turner, and Ann Richards. During this period he recorded a number of well-regarded solos with what would be known as the Mellophonium Bands; his most notable improvisations were from Kenton's Grammy winning albums Kenton's West Side Story and Adventures In Jazz, along with the CD Adventures In Time. One other interesting Baltazar solo that stands out from the Kenton recordings is on Johnny Richards' composition Wagon, which did not get issued until the early 1970s on a Capitol LP compilation; Wagon is part of the extra material re-issued onto the Cuban Fire! CD. Baltazar is widely known as one of the last great jazz soloists of that era of Kenton orchestras, having played on the band with artists such as Marvin Stamm, Sam Donahue, Dee Barton, Carl Saunders, and Don Menza.

After leaving the Kenton organization, Baltazar worked with Terry Gibbs in 1965, and recorded with Gil Fuller, Dizzy Gillespie, James Moody, Onzy Matthews, and Oliver Nelson. Between 1965 and 1969 he worked extensively in the Los Angeles recording studios, principally for NBC, where he played in the television orchestras for The Pat Boone Show, The Jerry Lewis Show, The Beautiful Phyllis Diller Show, The Tonight Show with Johnny Carson, The Smothers Brothers Show, and The Glen Campbell Goodtime Hour.

== Return to Hawaii and later musical career ==
Baltazar returned home to Hawaii in 1969 to rejoin and then become assistant director of the Royal Hawaiian Band. Except for a noted recording done at Capitol Studios which become the last LP Stan Kenton and Creative World would produce just before Kenton's death in 1979 (Stan Kenton presents Gabe Baltazar), his name was scarce during this time in the continental United States as a jazz soloist. Baltazar held the position with the Royal Hawaiian Band until 1985 when he retired from civil service. In 1973, Baltazar played sax and flute in the famous "Elvis: Aloha from Hawaii" satellite broadcast concert and had a close-up flute solo during "An American Trilogy" ("Battle Hymn of the Republic"). In the 1990s, Baltazar visited California often, to be bandleader and record jazz CDs for the Fresh Sounds and V.S.O.P. labels.

In 2012, the University of Hawaii Press published If It Swings, It's Music: The Autobiography of Hawaii's Gabe Baltazar Jr. The book was written by the biographer Theo Garneau, who based the work on extensive archival research, nearly 100 interviews with Baltazar's colleagues, friends, and family, and twenty-six interviews with Baltazar himself.

== Death ==
Gabe Baltazar died in Hilo on June 12, 2022, at the age of 92.

== Discography ==
As a Leader

- Stan Kenton presents Gabe Baltazar (Creative World, 1979)
- Gabe Baltazar Quartet: Back in Action (V.S.O.P., 1992)
- Gabe Baltazar: Birdology (Fresh Sound, 1992)

With Paul Togawa

- The Paul Togawa Quartet featuring Gabe Baltazar (Mode Records, 1957; V.S.O.P., 1987; CD issue: 1996)

With Stan Kenton

- Two Much! (Capitol, 1960) - with Ann Richards
- The Romantic Approach (Capitol, 1961)
- Kenton's West Side Story (Capitol, 1961)
- Sophisticated Approach (Capitol, 1961)
- Adventures in Standards (Creative World, 1961 [rel. 1975])
- Adventures In Jazz (Capitol, 1961)
- Adventures in Blues (Capitol, 1961 [rel. 1963])
- Adventures in Time (Capitol, 1962)
- Artistry in Bossa Nova (Capitol, 1963)
- Stan Kenton / Jean Turner (Capitol, 1963) - with Jean Turner
- Kenton / Wagner (Capitol, 1964)

With Gil Fuller

- Gil Fuller & the Monterey Jazz Festival Orchestra featuring Dizzy Gillespie (Pacific Jazz, 1965)
- Night Flight with Gil Fuller and James Moody (Pacific Jazz, 1965)

With Onzy Matthews

- Onzy Matthews: Mosaic Select (Originally recorded for Capitol 1963–1965. Mosaic, 2007) 3-CD set

With Oliver Nelson

- Sound Pieces (Impulse, 1966)
- Live from Los Angeles: Oliver Nelson's Big Band (Impulse, 1967)

With Richard Simon

- Groove Therapy (UFO Bass, 1995)

With Noel Okimoto

- Ohana: Featuring Makoto Ozone and Tiger Okoshi (Roy Sakuma Productions, 2003)

== See also ==
- Danny Barcelona
- Howard Rumsey

== Sources ==
- Danny Barcelona RIP, Gabe Baltazar, Contemporary of Danny Barcelona, JazzReview.com, Saturday, April 7, 2007, retrieved on: July 6, 2007.
- "Hawaii News | Honolulu Star-Advertiser". Starbulletin.com. February 25, 2020.
- "honolulujazzscene Resources and Information". Honolulujazzscene.net. Archived from the original on September 30, 2007.
- "Gabe Baltazar, Jr. | The Hawaii Book and Music Festival". Hbmf.wordpress.com. April 14, 2012.
- "STAGE PRESENCE edited by Theodore S. Gonzalves :: book review". Home.nestor.minsk.by. October 26, 2010.
