= Adventures in Blues =

Studio album by Stan Kenton
- Released: 1963
- Recorded: December 7, 12, 13 & 14, 1961
- Studio: Capitol (Hollywood)
- Genre: Jazz
- Label: Capitol T/ST 1985
- Producer: Lee Gillette

Stan Kenton chronology
Adventures in Jazz (1961)	Adventures in Blues (1963)	Stan Kenton! Tex Ritter! (1962)

Adventures in Blues is an album by the Stan Kenton Orchestra featuring compositions by Gene Roland recorded in late 1961 and released by Capitol Records in 1963.

== Reception ==
Professional ratings
Review scores
Source	Rating
Allmusic	4/5 stars
The Penguin Guide to Jazz Recordings	3/4 stars

The Allmusic review by Scott Yanow noted "This is one of the finer recordings by the Mellophonium Band, arguably Stan Kenton's last great orchestra. With the use of 20 horns, Roland was able to get a surprising amount of variety out of the material, making this a Kenton recording well worth investigating". On All About Jazz William Grim wrote "This may be the most swinging of all of Kenton's albums because the arrangements were done by Gene Roland, the most consistently swinging of all of the great arrangers who honed their talents writing for the Kenton juggernaut. ...Adventures in Blues is a great album and gives conclusive proof that when the music called for it, the Stan Kenton Orchestra could swing with the best of them".

== Track listing ==
All compositions by Gene Roland.

1. "Reuben's Blues" - 4:26
2. "Dragonwyck" - 4:40
3. "Blue Ghost" - 4:18
4. "Exit Stage Left" - 4:18
5. "Night at the Gold Nugget" - 5:36
6. "Formula SK-32" - 3:06
7. "Aphrodisia" - 3:11
8. "Fitz" - 4:30
9. "The Blue's Story" - 3:22
- Recorded at Capitol Studios in Hollywood, CA on December 7, 1961 (tracks 1, 3 & 4), December 12, 1961 (track 8), December 13, 1961 (tracks 2, 5 & 9) and December 14, 1961 (tracks 6 & 7).

== Personnel ==
- Stan Kenton - piano
- Bob Behrendt, Norman Baltazar, Bob Rolfe, Dalton Smith, Marvin Stamm - trumpet
- Dee Barton, Bob Fitzpatrick, Bud Parker - trombone
- Jim Amlotte, - bass trombone
- Dave Wheeler - bass trombone, tuba
- Dwight Carver, Keith LaMotte, Carl Saunders, Ray Starling - mellophone
- Gene Roland mellophone, soprano saxophone, arranger, conductor
- Gabe Baltazar - alto saxophone
- Buddy Arnold, Sam Donahue (tracks 2, 5, 6 & 7), Paul Renzi - tenor saxophone
- Allan Beutler - baritone saxophone
- Joel Kaye - baritone saxophone, bass saxophone
- Pat Senatore - bass
- Jerry McKenzie - drums
