= The Romantic Approach =

Studio album by The Stan Kenton Orchestra
- Released: 1961
- Recorded: March 11 and 20, 1961
- Studio: Goldwyn Sound Stage 5, Hollywood, CA
- Genre: Jazz, easy listening
- Label: Capitol T/ST 1533
- Producer: Lee Gillette

Stan Kenton chronology
Two Much! (1960)	The Romantic Approach (1961)	Kenton's West Side Story (1961)

The Romantic Approach is an album by the Stan Kenton Orchestra recorded in 1961 and released by Capitol Records. It is the first album by the orchestra to be released with a mellophonium section.

== Reception ==
Professional ratings
Review scores
Source	Rating
Down Beat	5/5 stars

The Down Beat review from September 28 of 1961, John Tynan writes about The Romantic Approach, "This is the first recorded sample of the new band and the now Kenton sound, and it is an auspicious debut, to be sure. As a straight, non jazz ballad set, it rates five stars for the imaginative writing, the richness and depth of velvet brass sounds, and the over-all sensitivity of feeling for the material." Tynan goes on, "While this is hardly an album for hipsters, there is much in the music that stands on merits apart from jazz."

== Track listing ==
1. "When Your Lover Has Gone" (Jimmy Van Heusen, Einar Aaron Swan) – 2:22
2. "All The Things You Are" (Oscar Hammerstein II, Jerome Kern) – 2:34
3. "I'm Glad There Is You" (Jimmy Dorsey, Paul Madeira) – 2:40
4. "Say It Isn't So" (Irving Berlin) – 2:30
5. "Imagination" (Gene Roland, Johnny Richards) – 3:09
6. "Sweet and Lovely" (Gus Arnheim, Charles N. Daniels, and Harry Tobias) – 3:27
7. "Fools Rush In" (Johnny Mercer, Rube Bloom) – 2:23
8. "You're Mine You" (Johnny Green, Edward Heyman) - 2:30
9. "Once In A While" (Michael Edwards, Bud Green) – 2:25
10. "Moonlight In Vermont" (John Blackburn, Karl Suessdorf) – 2:10
11. "I Understand" (Mabel Wayne, Kim Gannon) – 2:34
12. "Oh! You Crazy Moon" (Van Heusen, Burke) – 2:20
- Recorded at Goldwyn Sound Stage 5 in Hollywood, CA on March 11 and 20, 1961

== Personnel ==
- Stan Kenton – Piano, arranger, conductor
- Peter Chivily - Bass
- Jerry McKenzie - Drums
- George Acevedo (2) - Drums [Latin]
- Dwight Carver, Gene Roland, Gordon Davison, Keith LaMotte - Mellophonium
- Gabe Baltazar - Alto saxophone
- Sam Donahue, Paul Renzi - Tenor saxophone
- Marvin Holladay - Baritone saxophone
- Wayne Dunstan - Baritone saxophone, Bass saxophone
- Bob Fitzpatrick, Dave Wheeler, Jim Amlotte, Paul Heydorff - Trombone
- Bob Rolfe, Dalton Smith, Ernie Bernhardt, Larry McGuire, Sanford Skinner - Trumpet
- Clive Acker - Tuba
- Sherman Weisburd - Photography
- Kent Larsen - Producer
- Lee Gillette - Producer
