= Adventures in Jazz (album) =

Studio album by Stan Kenton
- Released: November 1962 (LP); 1999 (CD reissue)
- Recorded: July 5, 1961 in Hollywood at Capitol Records; September 26, 1961 at Manhattan Center in New York City (original LP); December 11/12/14, 1961 in Hollywood at Capitol Records (extra re-issued material on CD)
- Genres: Jazz, big band
- Length: 35:32 (LP); 53:11 (CD reissue)
- Label: Capitol
- Producers: Lee Gillette (LP); Michael Cuscuna (CD reissue)

Stan Kenton chronology
Adventures in Standards (1961)	Adventures in Jazz (1962)	Adventures in Blues (1961)
- Capitol ST-1796 (LP); Creative World ST-1010 (LP); Capitol Jazz 7243 5 21222 26 (CD)

Adventures in Jazz is a 1962 album by the Stan Kenton Orchestra. The album won a Grammy Award in the category for Best Jazz Performance – Large Group (Instrumental) category in 1963. This was Kenton's second Grammy, after his first received for Kenton's West Side Story in 1962. It was also nominated for Best Engineering Contribution – Other Than Novelty and Other Than Classical at the 1963 Grammys.

The 1999 CD re-issue of Adventures In Jazz is augmented with two alternate takes from the original recording sessions and one track from Kenton's release Sophisticated Approach.

== Background ==
The Kenton orchestra had been on a slow decline in sales and popularity in the late 1950s with having to compete with newer, popular music artists such as Elvis Presley, Bobby Darin, and The Platters. The nadir of this decline was around 1958 and coincided with a recession that was affecting the entire country. There were far fewer big bands on the road and live music venues were hard to book for the Kenton orchestra. The band would end 1959 beaten up by poor attendance at concerts and having to rely far more on dance halls than real jazz concerts. The band would reform in 1960 with a new look and new sound; Adventures In Jazz would be one of the albums to be part of an upsurge in Kenton's popularity.

This set of record dates for the Kenton organization's Adventures In Jazz is a high point for what was known as the "mellophonium band" (after the new brass instrument prominently featured) or as Kenton himself had coined the phrase "A New Era In Modern American Music." The group was able to turn a minimal profit and use those resources to record what would be a total of 11 albums in a three-year span. Touring up to nine months of the year did not leave much time to record; studio schedules were hectic. On the other hand, the band had been playing together so much on the road they were musically familiar and close-knit with one another. As a unit, the quality of the Kenton orchestra on the December 1961 Adventures In Jazz LP tracks is outstanding, particularly with an expanded orchestra of 22 musicians that included a mellophonium section. Kenton had tried to staff a musical group larger than this during the "Innovations in Modern Music" tour and recording sessions from 1950, with it ending in financial failure. Though not considered a "financial windfall," Adventures In Jazz and other "mellophonium band" projects were far more solvent than those of the aforementioned group from more than a decade earlier.

Until the "Adventures" recording sessions of December 1961, the history of the Kenton band using mellophoniums was rocky. Though the band was touring with a mellophonium section throughout the second half of 1960, it was not until the Merry Christmas recordings of February and March 1961 that Lee Gillette and Stan Kenton deemed any recordings with a Kenton mellophonium band acceptable for release to the public. The instrument plays notoriously out of tune and trumpet players had to be converted to the mellophonium. Prior to June 1960, the horn was new and untested in a real, musical playing environment. Two entire albums of material (sessions from Sept. 1960 and Feb. 1961) were left unreleased for more than a decade due to the problems associated with recording mellophoniums. Kenton commented, "The mellophonium is a peculiar instrument when you get in the upper register, you don't know what's going to come out from the thing, and it's hard to control." The kinks were worked out and the personnel of the Kenton orchestra persevered; Merry Christmas become both Billboard and Variety's top Christmas LP; both Kenton's West Side Story and Adventures In Jazz earned Grammys in 1962 and 1963 respectively.

For Kenton it was a very difficult time personally, even with the successes of the West Side Story and Adventures In Jazz albums. During the time of the recording in 1961, Kenton was suffering a huge personal embarrassment that surfaced in his professional life. His wife Ann Richards had done a nude layout for Hugh Hefner's Playboy, which came out in the June 1961 edition. She had also signed a contract to record with Atco Records, without her husband's knowledge. Kenton himself found out about the Playboy layout out on the road while playing at the Aragon Ballroom in Chicago, when handed the magazine by Charles Suter, who was the editor for Down Beat magazine at the time. Richards was 23 years younger than Kenton and was not typically on the road with the band, though she had recorded Two Much! just a couple of years earlier with Kenton. Divorce papers were filed in August 1961. While Kenton was being confronted by the personal embarrassment of the situation and the divorce was going through the courts in Los Angeles, he was riding on a new wave of success with the West Side Story album charting for 28 weeks in Billboard, peaking out at #16. The band had done the initial recording for Adventures In Jazz and would record the entire "Adventures" sessions in December.

Adventures In Jazz marks a high point in Kenton's jazz career as a band leader, due to the mellophonium experiment succeeding to at least a moderate level even with the LP released as a loose, disparate set of instrumental titles. The timing and success of Adventures in Jazz as a serious jazz album is of no coincidence, preceded by both hit LPs Merry Christmas and West Side Story. Through these two previous LPs the public got re-acquainted with Stan Kenton, allowing greater acceptance of a lesser-known set of musical numbers on Adventures In Jazz. Kenton also recorded a country single in September 1962 (as singer/narrator on "Mama Sang a Song") that made it to #32 on the Billboard Top 40, thereby helping to fund projects like the "Adventures" records. The LPs recorded with Tex Ritter and singer Jean Turner just before Adventures in Jazz did not gain any acceptance or financial gain. The environment for Kenton's pop music commercial successes was far more measured than 10 years earlier; the sound of a 22-piece mellophonium-style orchestra did not sell well to anything but a smaller, serious jazz audience. The group was far better equipped to present music designed specifically for only jazz instrumentals on a recording such as Adventures In Jazz.

This would be the last set of Kenton bandsmen that were closer to him in age and respectability as "jazz stars." Sam Donahue appears as a soloist, arranger, and section player, having established himself on earlier Artie Shaw and Woody Herman recordings; Donahue had a couple of successful recordings with Capitol himself. By December 1961, Kenton had turned 50; many of his contemporaries from earlier Kenton groups had established their own careers and moved on. On Adventures in Jazz the Kenton band plays at a mature, musical level due to the set of older players with much more diverse backgrounds than later personnel on the bands. The very talented younger players just out of school such as Dee Barton, Marvin Stamm, and Dwight Carver were trained by veteran players such as Bob Fitzpatrick and Gene Roland. This was not necessarily the case in the late 1960s and 1970s Kenton bands having to rely heavily on schools such as University of North Texas, Berklee School of Music, and Eastman School of Music. Those schools could provide young, adept jazz players who could travel but were far less experienced in professional musical settings. The artistic success of Adventures In Jazz is a testament to a combination of Kenton's perseverance, timing, individual musicians, and talented composer/arrangers who were a part of those recording sessions.

== The Music for Adventures In Jazz ==
"Turtle Talk" starts the album and is the "opening act" for Dee Barton as a composer and new trombonist for the Kenton Orchestra. Barton would later take the drum chair on the Kenton band showing the multi-talents he brought to the table for this group and later studio work he would do. Both "Turtle Talk" and "Waltz of the Prophets" use the same harmonic pallet of relying on augmented chords and whole tone scales. "Waltz of the Prophets" had been recorded a couple of years earlier by the University of North Texas One O'Clock Lab Band and was Barton's résumé material to write for the Kenton group. Both works carve a new niche in the Kenton book, but do not vary in terms of fit or finish, for what is expected from the Kenton repertoire. "Waltz of the Prophets" is unique in the overtly gospel aspects of the work showing Barton's musical roots having been raised in Mississippi. These two works as well as several others on the album served as mainstay pieces that would be played for years to come in live performances for the Kenton orchestra; not all Kenton works lasted this long on the bandstand. Barton later went on to fame (like other Kenton writers Pete Rugolo and Lennie Niehaus) as a composer for films such as Clint Eastwood's Play Misty for Me.

The two most widely known tracks from the album are "Limehouse Blues" and "Malagueña" arranged by Bill Holman. Though Holman is well known for Kenton charts on the New Concepts of Artistry in Rhythm, Contemporary Concepts, and Stan Kenton Presents Bill Holman LPs, these two instrumental charts penned for Kenton are now hallmarks of the modern jazz orchestra repertoire. Kenton would use "Malagueña" with the band all the way to his death in 1978. The two charts have also become staples of both drums corps and marching bands. This success has been credited to Holman's musical inventiveness, as well as to the performing band.

Holman does the best with everything, so he wrote great for mellophoniums. Malagueña stands out, that was probably one of the best arrangements ever written.

— Carl Saunders

"Malagueña" itself had a history with the Kenton Orchestra due to the second time this Ernesto Lecuona piano work was arranged for the group. Kenton's desire for having several arrangers do a chart on the same source material was not uncommon during this period. The first arrangement of "Malagueña" for the band was done by Stan Kenton himself for the 1956 LP Sketches On Standards due to Kenton's affinity for piano music (a skillful pianist himself) and finding material suitable for the orchestra. This was just after "Malagueña" was recorded by the composer as a piano solo on the 1955 RCA Victor LP Lecuona Plays Lecuona. "Malagueña" later shows up in 1960 on the flip side of Connie Francis' #1 hit single "My Heart Has a Mind of Its Own", helping prompt Kenton to revisit the piece.

A third chart from Holman on the LP is "Stairway To The Stars" featuring alto saxophonist Gabe Baltazar. The work was commissioned by Kenton in wanting another alto feature like those written in the past for Art Pepper, Bud Shank, and Lee Konitz. This would be the piece most closely associated with Baltazar for the rest of his playing career, signifying his five-year stint with the Kenton orchestra.

Longtime Kenton composer and arranger Gene Roland penned the mellophonium feature of "Misty" for Ray Starling. Roland was the person who first brought the idea of a mellophonium section to Kenton. Roland can also be heard on track #8 of the CD re-issue playing mellophonium; he is familiar with the instrument and creates a nice framework for Starling.

With the addition of Sam Donahue to the band as a featured tenor sax soloist, Kenton also includes "Body and Soul" on the recording to feature Donahue as both soloist and arranger. The chart itself is not at the level of others from the LP but has great appeal due to Donahue's muscular tenor playing. The listener is reminded of earlier Kenton sidemen such as Vido Musso or a tenor player such as Charlie Ventura.

Ironically, due to the nearly year delay for a release, the music from Adventures In Jazz had been played many times over and even previewed on Steve Allen's highly acclaimed show Jazz Scene USA earlier in 1962. It was well-worn material and not a surprise to a great deal of the jazz listening public by the time the release surfaced in late 1962.

== Recording Adventures In Jazz ==
By the time the LP Adventures In Jazz was released in late 1962 there were already several other recording projects that had made it to release dates the Kenton orchestra had completed after the December 1961 "Adventures" sessions. The original set of tracks was recorded as part of a flurry of studio activity in December 1961 constituting the bulk of the "Adventures" series of LPs: Adventures in Blues, Adventures in Jazz and Adventures In Standards. The tracks for the fourth in the series, Adventures in Time, would be recorded in September 1962.

As mentioned earlier, the group did not play well on the initial recording date during September 1961 in New York. Kenton envisioned recording a real "jazz album" of this kind being completed in New York with his new configuration. The sound of the room and the situation did not lend itself to optimal tracking conditions, leaving both Kenton and producer Gillette to abort the session.

The December 11 take of "Malagueña" was rejected due to the poor quality of the band's playing. Kenton believed the band played better when the studio was cold. Before the December 12 session the air conditioning was left on all night. Kenton "...told the band to wrap up well and not grumble, and we got a good take inside a half-an-hour."

This album stands as a pinnacle during the "Golden Age of Hi-Fi" and having a large ensemble playing nearly uncut and unedited with uncompressed sound. Adventures In Jazz was also nominated for Best Engineered Large ensemble recording for the 1963 Grammys. The studio at Capitol is relied upon to produce a natural set of acoustics. Between the fact an actual touring group of this caliber is being recorded without massive editing or overdubs and little to no compression or reverb is added makes it as close as one can get to 'live.' This is as clean and clear a large ensemble jazz album can be; nearly flawless playing is executed by the Kenton band on the recording. One has to work hard to find mistakes when listening repeated times; the sound is unequaled by many later recordings of the band relying on far more recording technology.

== Soloists from Adventures In Jazz ==
The solo feature for Gabe Baltazar is a performance he became known for during his tenure with the Kenton orchestra, in the way that Lennie Niehaus became associated with the solo on "Cherokee", Bud Shank on "Elegy For Alto", or Art Pepper on "Art Pepper". According to critics, Baltazar sounds comfortable and mature; the performance represents the pinnacle of his work associated with the Kenton organization. The arrangement combines a ballad section with a fast-tempo section, and the reviewer describes his playing as sensitive on the former and responsive on the latter. His solo on "Limehouse Blues" is also noted, and the reviewer names the two as stand-out solo features on the LP.

During his time with Stan Kenton, Marvin Stamm becomes a major name in jazz circles and the solos from this album helped to make this happen. Stamm is equal to the task of great trumpet soloists from past Kenton groups such as Jack Sheldon or Conte Candoli. He plays over the changes of two contrasting works which are quite notable; this includes solos on "Limehouse Blues" ("the fluid trumpet of Marvin Stamm has its say") and "Waltz Of The Prophets".

"Misty" features Ray Starling. This is the first true mellophonium feature recorded by Kenton on a Capitol release. In many ways it is sad the earlier mellophonium features such as "Four Of A Kind" did not get recorded in the studio like this. Starling is a converted trumpet player like others such as Carl Saunders and "Misty" certainly makes the case for his inclusion as a sensitive and formidable soloist. Starling shows the mellophonium is worthy of being included as a jazz instrument that can be heard improvising.

Adventures in Jazz is greatly helped by Sam Donahue being included as a soloist. One might think he is not to the standard of modern soloists but Donahue does not take a back seat to the other players. His style is more in the style of a 'Texas tenor' player such as Arnett Cobb or an earlier Kenton tenor player such as Vido Musso but it balances the LP out very well. He matches the big Kenton sound very well and turns in some great playing on the feature of "Body And Soul" as well as "Limehouse Blues" and "Malagueña".

== Legacy of Adventures In Jazz ==
Adventures In Jazz is easily the seminal work that defines what the Kenton band sounds like in the early 1960s until Kenton's death in 1979. One can argue it crosses the band over into being known as a much more concertizing orchestra rather than a dance band. While Kenton was still being defined by Dynaflow and The Peanut Vendor up to that time, pieces like "Malagueña" and "Turtle Talk" would redefine the repertoire the public knew from the Kenton band. This is one of the finest albums ever recorded by the Stan Kenton Orchestra.

Some of the best drumming to be heard on record for large jazz ensemble is done by Jerry McKenzie. Again, the Holman charts are very demanding and McKenzie demonstrates he is easily on par with highly regarded drummers of that era such as Sonny Payne with the Count Basie Orchestra and Jake Hanna or Ronnie Zito with the Woody Herman Orchestra. This specific recording and drummer are cited by Peter Erskine, who would later become famous with the Kenton orchestra of the mid-1970s. Erskine talks about the influence McKenzie's playing would have on him growing up and how he learned a great deal from McKenzie when on his first gig with the Kenton band backing June Christy at Lincoln Center in New York.

Grammy Awards

Year			Result
1963	Adventures In Jazz	Best Engineered LP (non-classical, non-novelty)	Nominated
1963	Adventures In Jazz	Best Jazz Performance – Large Group (Instrumental)	Won

== Reception ==
Professional ratings
Review scores
Source	Rating
Billboard; November 17, 1962	(Jazz LP's review strong sales potential)
Jazz Journal; May, 1963	favorable
Down Beat; January 31, 1963	2/5 stars
Billboard; Feb. 16, 1963	#3 New Action LPs (stereo); Strong sales
AllMusic	4.5/5 stars
All About Jazz	outstanding
Penguin Guide to Jazz	3/4 stars

- The contrast of Billboard to Down Beat is quite drastic in the reviews in Nov. 1962 and Jan. 1963.

"The Stan Kenton orchestra turns in ear-catching performances here of a flock of new and old tunes, all of them featuring big styled, full blown arrangements. The orchestra sells them with the tonal color that Kenton has stressed over the last few years."

Billboard Magazine, November 17, 1962

"Kenton always has an affinity for bombast, but his bands have recorded some notable music: the LP with Young Blood and My Lady (New Concepts of Artistry in Rhythm) is one of the finest modern big-band albums ever cut. Unfortunately, this session seems to be devoted to cacophony..."

Down Beat Magazine, January 31, 1963

- Recent review on 1999 CD re-issue

"This excellent outing by the 1961 edition of Stan Kenton's orchestra has one classic (Bill Holman's arrangement of Malaguena), a superior solo by altoist Gabe Baltazar on Stairway to the Stars, a feature for Ray Starling's mellophonium (Misty), a good workout by veteran tenor Sam Donahue on Body and Soul, Holman's reworking of Limehouse Blues, and two colorful Dee Barton composition/arrangements. This well-rounded LP (which also has some solos by trumpeter Marvin Stamm) is one of Kenton's best of the era."

Scott Yanow, AllMusic Guide

== Track listing ==
No.	Title	Writer(s)	Length
1.	"Turtle Talk"	Dee Barton	5:32
2.	"Stairway to the Stars"	Matty Malneck, Mitchell Parish, Frank Signorelli	5:50
3.	"Limehouse Blues"	Philip Braham, Douglas Furber	4:29
4.	"Malagueña"	Ernesto Lecuona	4:25
5.	"Misty"	Johnny Burke, Erroll Garner	3:37
6.	"Waltz of the Prophets"	Dee Barton	6:45
7.	"Body and Soul"	Frank Eyton, Johnny Green, Edward Heyman, Robert Sour	5:20
8.	"It Might as Well Be Spring"	Oscar Hammerstein II, Richard Rodgers	5:17
9.	"Waltz of the Prophets" (first version)	Dee Barton	6:32
10.	"Body and Soul" (first version)	Eyton, Green, Heyman, Sour	5:24

- Tracks 1–7 comprised the original Capitol ST-1796, Adventures in Jazz LP (1962)
- Track 8 was first issued on Capitol ST-1018, Sophisticated Approach LP (1962)
- Tracks 9 & 10 are alternate takes from the original recording sessions

== Recording sessions ==
Tracks 1–7 – December 11/12/14, 1961 in Hollywood, CA. at Capitol Tower Studios

Track 8 – July 5, 1961, in Hollywood, CA. at Capitol Tower Studios

Tracks 9–10 – Sept. 26, 1961 Manhattan Center, New York, N.Y.

"It Might As Well Be Spring" was first released on Sophisticated Approach (Capitol ST 1674) and added to the 1999 CD release.

The first tracks for Adventures In Jazz were done in September in New York but scrapped for the later takes done in December in Hollywood (please refer to narrative for "recording").

== Personnel ==
=== Musicians ===
==== Tracks 1–7 ====
- Piano, Conductor – Stan Kenton
- Alto saxophone – Gabe Baltazar
- Tenor saxophone – Sam Donahue (3/4/6/7), Buddy Arnold, Paul Renzi
- Baritone saxophone – Allan Beutler
- Bass saxophone – Joel Kaye
- Trumpet – Dalton Smith, Bob Rolfe, Marvin Stamm, Bob Behrendt, Norman Baltazar
- Mellophonium – Keith LaMotte, Carl Saunders, Ray Starling, Dwight Carver
- Trombone – Bob Fitzpatrick, Dee Barton, Bud Parker
- Bass trombone or tuba – Jim Amlotte, Dave Wheeler
- Bass – Pat Senatore
- Drums – Jerry Lestock McKenzie

==== Track 8 ====
- Piano, Conductor – Stan Kenton
- Alto saxophone – Gabe Baltazar
- Tenor saxophone – Sam Donahue, Paul Renzi
- Baritone saxophone – Marvin Holladay
- Bass saxophone – Wayne Dunstan
- Trumpet – Dalton Smith, Bud Brisbois, Marvin Stamm, Bob Behrendt, Bob Rolf
- Mellophonium – Keith LaMotte, Carl Saunders, Gene Roland, Dwight Carver
- Trombone – Bob Fitzpatrick, Jack Spurlock, Bud Parker
- Bass trombone or tuba – Jim Amlotte, Dave Wheeler
- Bass – Red Mitchell
- Drums – Jerry Lestock McKenzie

==== Tracks 9–10 ====
- Piano, Conductor – Stan Kenton
- Alto saxophone – Gabe Baltazar
- Tenor saxophone – Sam Donahue, Paul Renzi
- Baritone saxophone – Marvin Holladay
- Bass saxophone and baritone saxophone – Allan Beutler
- Trumpet – Dalton Smith, Bob Rolfe, Marvin Stamm, Bob Behrendt, Norman Baltazar
- Mellophonium – Keith LaMotte, Carl Saunders, Ray Starling, Dwight Carver
- Trombone – Bob Fitzpatrick, Dee Barton, Bud Parker
- Bass trombone or tuba – Jim Amlotte, Dave Wheeler
- Bass – Pat Senatore,
- Drums – Jerry Lestock McKenzie

=== Production ===
- Producer for all tracks: Lee Gillette
- Re-issue (CD) producer: Michael Cuscuna
- Digital transfers (CD): Ron McMaster
- CD design: Patrick Roques
- Liner notes: unknown (from original LP)

== Bibliography ==
- Easton, Carol, Straight Ahead: The Story of Stan Kenton. William Morrow & Company, Inc. New York, N.Y. 1973.
- Lee, William F., Kenton, Audree Coke. Stan Kenton: Artistry In Rhythm. Creative Press of Los Angeles. 1980.
- Sparke, Michael. "Stan Kenton: This Is An Orchestra". University of North Texas Press. 2010.
- Sparke, Michael;, Venudor, Peter. "Stan Kenton, The Studio Sessions". Balboa Books. 1998.
