= Kenton's West Side Story =

Studio album by Stan Kenton
- Released: 1961 original LP, 1994 re-issue CD
- Recorded: March 15–16, 1961; April 11, 1961
- Studios: Goldwyn Sound Stage, Hollywood, California
- Genre: Jazz
- Length: 39:13
- Label: Capitol
- Producer: Lee Gillette

Stan Kenton chronology
| The Romantic Approach (1961) | Kenton's West Side Story (1961) | A Merry Christmas! (1961) |

Kenton's West Side Story is an album by the Stan Kenton Orchestra recorded in 1961 and released by Capitol Records. It won the Grammy Award in 1962 for Best Jazz Performance – Large Group (Instrumental). The album was recorded in 1961 and released quickly to take advantage of the movie premiere of the musical West Side Story. Kenton won his first Grammy Award and he won again the next year in the same category with Adventures in Jazz. Kenton's West Side Story peaked at No. 16 on the Billboard magazine album chart.

== Background ==
The Kenton orchestra had been on a slow decline in sales and popularity in the late 1950s with having to compete with newer, popular music artists such as Elvis Presley, Bobby Darin and The Platters. The nadir of this decline was around 1958 and coincided with a recession that was effecting the entire country. There were far fewer big bands on the road and live music venues were hard to book for the Kenton orchestra. The band ended 1959 beaten up by poor attendance at concerts and having to rely far more on dance halls than real jazz concerts. The band reformed in 1960 with a new look and new sound, West Side Story was one of the first 'mellophonium' albums, featuring the newly developed trumpet/French horn hybrid instrument, to be part of an upsurge in Kenton's popularity.

Lee Gillette and the other Capitol executives were pushing Kenton towards more commercially viable recording projects in the early 1960s. Kenton made concessions to this; one very outcome of these practical commercial choices was the West Side Story LP. Johnny Richards was chosen as the arranger for the project after seeing his success with Cuban Fire! and having helped design the mellophonium. Johnny Richards' music was substantial - "steel and concrete," Kenton called it. "Johnny was probably the best schooled, musically, of all of us put together." The handling of Bernstein's crowning achievement as a Broadway composer by the Kenton band was going to take a very experienced and adept arranger.

This was the only time an entire Kenton LP was devoted to a single show; it was the closest thing that could be easily adapted to fit the large scale, progressive jazz style of the Kenton group. The Mirisch Company's film adaptation of West Side Story starring Natalie Wood and Richard Beymer was scheduled for release in September 1961. Both Kenton and Capitol producer Lee Gillette took advantage of the film coming out and jumped on the opportunity to use Bernstein's award-winning music to be a fitting vehicle for the large scale sound of the new "Mellophonium Band." When the Kenton album was released, it started charting just before the film had been released in most major American cities. The Capitol LP was perfectly timed by producer Lee Gillette.

There were a great many successes attributed to the Kenton's West Side Story none of which is more interesting than the visit by Mirisch representatives to the Capitol Tower in Hollywood, California. With the movie nearly complete, Lee Gillette had invited the Mirisch people to hear what the Kenton/Richards collaboration had produced (listen to the mix and mastering). The movie producers were very impressed, "We had no idea! If we only knew!". The implication being the Capitol produced West Side Story could or would have been part of the soundtrack. In the end, full endorsement was given by Mirisch to allow a still photo from the movie to be used as the cover of Kenton's West Side Story. As it happened both the Kenton LP and Columbia Records produced sound track co-existed beautifully on the commercial market with both winning Grammys in 1962 for Best sound track LP and Best large ensemble jazz LP.

The first public performance of the Kenton Mellophonium Band was sandwiched between the two Kenton West Wide Story recording sessions. The Mellophonium Band did not make its public debut until March 29, 1961, at the Riviera Hotel in Las Vegas, almost 8 months after the mellophonium was introduced as part of the regular instrumentation. After numerous aborted recording sessions and a long road of finding appropriate repertoire, Kenton now was on the cusp of his most commercially successful album release.

== Recording ==
I loved playing Johnny's music, and so did Stan. West Side Story was probably the toughest album I ever recorded...

— Jerry McKenzie

The music arranged by Johnny Richards for Kenton's West Side Story is outstanding but was difficult to execute. Due to the taxing brass writing there are 7 trumpets used on the sessions, 2 of them being kept in reserve to give other trumpet players a needed break while recording. Many of the earlier problems presented with the mellophonium had been worked out making this the first score and recording sessions (other than Christmas music or ballads) that really worked for this new incarnation of the Kenton band.

Richards thought the original Broadway score to be repetitive and appropriate alterations were made to the harmonic and rhythmic structures. To fill in the blanks, there are numerous 'Richard-isms' in Kenton's West Side Story that surface musically; a great deal of stylistic characteristics of his renderings of Bernstein's music are borrowed from the successful 1956 Cuban Fire! LP and his other Kenton orchestrations. Many of the Afro-Latin themes from both Kenton LPs (Cuban Fire! vs West Side Story) are similar but both retain their uniqueness in the hands of Richards.

It is mentioned earlier about Mirisch Company executive being impressed with the Johnny Richards orchestrations but in the end there is little doubt Richards designed his charts for the Kenton band. Solo space had to be allowed for the Kenton soloists to improvise, this is unheard of with a show score. There are also distinct woodwind sounds in the original soundtrack (flute, clarinet, oboe, English horn) that are not in the Richards interpretations.

Johnny Richards makes some interesting changes to tempos of the Bernstein score. He turns Gee, Officer Krupke into a big band chart more akin to something from the Count Basie Orchestra; closer to an orchestration by Neal Hefti or Billy Byers. Besides the Prologue, Cool is probably the most distinctively Johnny Richards arrangement that is for more his than Bernstein's. Many of Richards' orchestration devices used in Cuban Fire! and Kenton's later LP Adventures in Time can be heard in Cool so to bolster what Richards perceived as repetitive melodies and chords structures from the original.

In the final analysis the Kenton recording and Richards' orchestrations are magnificent but not as much in a "jazz" sense as they are just good music. The Bernstein themes and content are theatrical and one cannot avoid the musical picture this paints. The placement of lengthy improvised jazz solos are not there and Richards' orchestration is very heavily relied upon to carry the day. In no way does the LP accomplish the same things the later Kenton Grammy winning LP Adventures In Jazz achieves. It is understandable why the general public (vs a hard core jazz audience) was willing to readily accept Kenton's West Side Story propelling it to such high ratings with Billboard during 1961 and 1962.

== Soloists from Kenton's West Side Story ==
Conte Candoli is a jazz soloist on trumpet. He backed his way onto the Kenton's West Side Story LP due to the failure of Ernie Berhardt to fill the trumpet solo slots and Marvin Stamm's inability to return to the role. Kenton ends up personally asking Candoli to do the sessions.

Gabe Baltazar, Sam Donahue and Gene Roland are also nice additions to the solo roster but any one of them does not play any substantial statement of improvisation. Again, the solo space is very limited by the theatrical content of the music and Johnny Richards trying to stay true to the music with his orchestrations.

== Legacy of Kenton's West Side Story ==
The Kenton's West Side Story LP charted for 26 weeks in Billboard starting in October 1961, peaking at #16 in November on the Billboard Magazine Hot 100 albums. Stan Kenton is listed in Today's Top Record Talent honor roll in Billboard's April 4, 1963 issue citing both Adventures In Jazz and Kenton's West Side Story as top selling hits.

Grammy Awards

| Year | | | Result |
|---|---|---|---|
| 1962 | Kenton's West Side Story | Best Jazz Performance - Large Group (Instrumental) | Won |

=== Additional charts ===
| Chart (1961) | Position |
|---|---|
| U.S. Billboard Year-end | 160 |
| Chart (April 1962) | Position |
| U.S. Billboard top selling jazz albums | 9 |

== Reception ==
Professional ratings
Review scores
| Source | Rating |
|---|---|
| Billboard; October 16, 1961 | (Kenton and Reed Break Big); No. 4 National Breakouts) |
| Billboard; February 3, 1962 | No. 52 of top 150 LPs (mono), No. 52 of top 50 LPs (stereo) |
| Billboard; September 11, 1961 | Review of New Albums; Pop LP's; Strong Sales Potential |
| AllMusic | 4.5/5 stars |
| Down Beat | 2/5 stars |
| The Rolling Stone Jazz Record Guide | 1/5 stars |

"Arranger Johnny Richards is responsible for the sometimes wild, sometimes mournful, but always interesting reading by the Kenton band of the "West Side Story" score. Kenton has assembled a huge orchestra to play the exciting music from the show and top-flight stereo recording make the listener's room jump with the life of the music. Naturally there are good doses of jazz in the set and some tine solo highlights by Kenton himself at piano. The excellence of the LP as a whole, effective use of stereo positioning, and release timed with showing of the "West Side" motion picture all should aid in sales of the album."

Billboard

Review on 1999 CD reissue

"When the producers of the film West Side Story heard a sampling of what the Stan Kenton Orchestra had done to their score, they were disappointed that they had not thought to ask the band to play on the soundtrack. Johnny Richards's arrangements of ten of the famous play's melodies are alternately dramatic and tender with plenty of the passion displayed by the characters in the story. Soloists include altoist Gabe Baltazar, veteran tenor Sam Donahue and trumpeter Conte Candoli, but it is the raging ensembles that are most memorable about the classic recording. This CD reissue is highly recommended."

Scott Yanow, AllMusic

== Track listing ==
All tracks are written by Leonard Bernstein/Stephen Sondheim, all arranged by Johnny Richards.

| No. | Title | Length |
|---|---|---|
| 1. | "Prologue" | 4:05 |
| 2. | "Something's Coming" | 3:35 |
| 3. | "Maria" | 4:25 |
| 4. | "America" | 4:37 |
| 5. | "Tonight" | 3:40 |
| 6. | "Cool" | 4:23 |
| 7. | "I Feel Pretty" | 3:50 |
| 8. | "Officer Krupke" | 2:58 |
| 9. | "Taunting Scene (The Rumble)" | 3:50 |
| 10. | "Somewhere - Finale" | 3:10 |
| Total length: | | 39:13 |

Note

- Tracks 1–10 comprised the original Capitol ST-1609 (1961)
- Tracks 1–10 recorded March 15/16, April 11, 1961, in Hollywood, CA. at Goldwyn Sound Stage #5.

== Personnel ==
=== Musicians ===
- Stan Kenton – piano, conductor
- Gabe Baltazar – alto saxophone
- Sam Donahue – tenor saxophone
- Paul Renzi – tenor saxophone
- Marvin Holladay – baritone saxophone
- Wayne Dunstan – baritone and bass saxophones
- Ernie Bernhardt, Bud Brisbois, Conte Candoli, Larry McGuire, Bob Rolfe, Sanford Skinner, Dalton Smith – trumpet
- Joe Burnett, Dwight Carver, Gordon Davison, Keith LaMotte, Gene Roland – mellophonium
- Bob Fitzpatrick, Paul Heydorff, Jack Spurlock – trombone
- Jim Amlotte – bass trombone
- Dave Wheeler – bass trombone
- Clive Acker – tuba
- Pete Chivily – bass
- Jerry Lestock McKenzie – drums
- Larry Bunker or Lou Singer – tympani
- Mike Pacheco – bongos
- George Acevedo – congas

=== Production ===
- Lee Gillette – producer
- Kent Larsen – producer
- Ted Daryll – reissue producer
- Ron McMaster – digital transfer

== See also ==
- Stan Kenton
- Johnny Richards
- West Side Story
- West Side Story (1961 soundtrack)
- Mellophonium

== Bibliography ==
- Daryll, Ted. Kenton's West Side Story (CD liner notes). Capitol Jazz. 1994.
- Easton, Carol. Straight Ahead: The Story of Stan Kenton. William Morrow & Company, Inc. New York, N.Y. 1973.
- Lee, William F., Kenton, Audree Coke. Stan Kenton: Artistry In Rhythm. Creative Press of Los Angeles. 1980.
- Sparke, Michael. Stan Kenton: This Is An Orchestra. University of North Texas Press. 2010.
- Sparke, Michael;, Venudor, Peter. Stan Kenton, The Studio Sessions. Balboa Books. 1998.
