= Adventures in Standards =

Studio album by Stan Kenton
- Released: 1975
- Recorded: December 5, 6, 7, 14 1961
- Studio: Capitol (Hollywood)
- Genre: Jazz
- Label: Creative World ST 1025
- Producer: Lee Gillette

Stan Kenton chronology
Sophisticated Approach (1961)	Adventures in Standards (1975)	Adventures in Jazz (1961)

Adventures in Standards is an album of Broadway show tunes by the Stan Kenton Mellophonium Orchestra recorded in 1961 for Capitol Records but not released until 1975 on Kenton's Creative World label.

Professional ratings
Review scores
Source	Rating
Allmusic	3/5 stars

== Track listing ==
1. "Some Enchanted Evening" (Richard Rodgers, Oscar Hammerstein II) - 3:36
2. "Begin the Beguine" (Cole Porter) - 3:37
3. "It's All Right With Me" (Porter) - 2:31
4. "Make Someone Happy" (Jule Styne, Adolph Green, Betty Comden) - 3:17
5. "Old Devil Moon" (Burton Lane, Yip Harburg) - 3:02
6. "Gigi" (Frederick Loewe, Alan Jay Lerner) - 3:07
7. "Come Rain or Come Shine" (Harold Arlen, Johnny Mercer) - 2:35
8. "Almost Like Being in Love" (Loewe, Lerner) - 2:32
9. "Just in Time" (Jule Styne, Comden, Green) - 2:03
10. "If I Were a Bell" (Frank Loesser) - 2:12
11. "Bewitched, Bothered and Bewildered" (Rodgers, Lorenz Hart) - 2:38
12. "I've Grown Accustomed to Her Face" (Loewe, Lerner) - 2:35
- Recorded at Capitol Studios in Hollywood, CA on December 5, 1961 (tracks 1, 4, 6 & 7), December 6, 1961 (tracks 3, 11 & 12), December 7, 1961 (tracks 2, 5, 9 & 10) and December 14, 1961 (track 8).

== Personnel ==
- Stan Kenton - piano, conductor
- Bob Behrendt, Norman Baltazar, Bob Rolfe, Dalton Smith, Marvin Stamm - trumpet
- Dee Barton, Bob Fitzpatrick, Bud Parker - trombone
- Jim Amlotte, - bass trombone
- Dave Wheeler - bass trombone, tuba
- Dwight Carver, Keith LaMotte, Carl Saunders, Ray Starling - mellophone
- Gabe Baltazar - alto saxophone
- Buddy Arnold, Paul Renzi - tenor saxophone
- Allan Beutler - baritone saxophone
- Joel Kaye - baritone saxophone, bass saxophone
- Pat Senatore - bass
- Jerry McKenzie - drums
- Lennie Niehaus - arranger
