= Stan Kenton! Tex Ritter! =

Studio album by Stan Kenton and Tex Ritter
- Released: 1962
- Recorded: March 26, 29 & 30, 1962
- Studio: Capitol (Hollywood)
- Genre: Jazz, Country music
- Length: 35:46
- Label: Capitol T/ST 1757
- Producer: Lee Gillette

Stan Kenton chronology
Adventures in Blues (1961)	Stan Kenton! Tex Ritter! (1962)	Adventures in Time (1962)

Stan Kenton! Tex Ritter! is an album by the Stan Kenton Orchestra with country music vocalist Tex Ritter performing country music compositions arranged in a big band style recorded and released by Capitol Records in 1962.

== Reception ==
Professional ratings
Review scores
Source	Rating
Allmusic	2/5 stars

The Allmusic review by Bruce Eder noted "overall this wasn't the worst idea in the world. The public never bought it, however, and the album was quickly deleted".

== Track listing ==
1. "The Bandit of Brazil" (Alfredo Nascimento, Michael Carr, John Turner) – 2:23
2. "The Green Leaves of Summer" (Dimitri Tiomkin, Paul Francis Webster) – 2:24
3. "Home on the Range" (Traditional) – 3:18
4. "Wagon Wheels" (Billy Hill, Peter DeRose) – 2:09
5. "Empty Saddles" (Hill) – 2:36
6. "High Noon (Do Not Forsake Me)" (Tiomkin, Ned Washington) – 2:42
7. "Cool Water" (Bob Nolan) – 2:34
8. "September Song" (Kurt Weill, Maxwell Anderson) – 3:57
9. "Red River Valley" (Traditional) – 3:56
10. "Cimarron (Roll On)" (Johnny Bond) – 3:20
11. "Take Me Back to My Boots and Saddle" (Teddy Powell, Walter G. Samuels, Leonard Whitcup 2:45
12. "The Last Round Up" (Hill) – 3:42
- Recorded at Capitol Studios in Hollywood, CA on March 26, 1962 (tracks 7 & 8), March 29, 1962 (tracks 2, 3, 5 & 9) and March 30, 1962 (tracks 1, 4, 6 & 10–12).

== Personnel ==
- Stan Kenton – piano, celeste, arranger, conductor (tracks 2, 3, 5 & 7–9)
- Tex Ritter – vocals
- Dee Barton, Bob Fitzpatrick, Newell Parker – trombone
- Jim Amlotte, – bass trombone
- Dave Wheeler – bass trombone, tuba
- Dwight Carver, Gene Roland, Carl Saunders, Ray Starling – mellophonium
- Lex de Azevedo – piano, celeste (tracks 1, 4, 6 & 10–12)
- Alvino Rey – console guitar
- Don Bagley – bass
- Art Anton – drums
- Lennie Niehaus – arranger, conductor (tracks 1, 4, 6 & 10–12)
