= Stan Kenton Presents Gabe Baltazar =

Studio album by Gabe Baltazar
- Released: 1979
- Recorded: January 9–11, 1979 in Hollywood, California; Capitol Studios
- Genre: Jazz, big band, instrumental
- Length: 39:13
- Label: Creative World Records
- Producer: Wayne Dunstan; Assistant producer - Bill Cole

Gabe Baltazar chronology
Confessin' the Blues (1976)	Stan Kenton Presents; Gabe Baltazar (1979)	Back In Action (1992)
- Creative World Records CW-3005 (LP)

Stan Kenton Presents Gabe Baltazar is an album by Gabe Baltazar. It was the last recording by Stan Kenton's Creative World Records label prior to Kenton's death on August 25, 1979. It was also the last of the "Stan Kenton presents..." series of albums (Bill Holman, Bill Russo, Bob Cooper, etc.); this recording presents the talent of the alto saxophonist and former Kenton band member Gabe Baltazar. Though never reissued on CD the recording is critically acclaimed and does a good job highlighting the jazz talents of a legendary jazz artist (Baltazar) at the peak of his playing career. He is backed up by a 17 piece big band on most cuts, a string section is added to one track.

== Background ==
"To say a musician is 'legendary' is to compound a cliche. But ask any jazz musician about Gabe Baltazar. He is a legend. Gabe was a joy to me all the years he was a member of my band. He is a master of his instrument, a great guy and a great artist. I am so proud to present him on the Creative World label. Listen and you'll see why it's all right to use the word 'legendary' once in a while."

— Stan Kenton

Both producer Wayne Dunstan and saxophonist Gabe Baltazar lived in Hawaii after having been on the Stan Kenton orchestra together in the 1960s, both serving in Kenton's sax section. Dunstan had approached Baltazar in October 1978 about having the money to record and arrange ten charts for Baltazar to be featured on for a new recording. When Dunstan had finally got back to him there was no music for the sessions but Dunstan had the money to go ahead with the recording.

Both Dunstan and Baltazar arranged for the recording to be at Capitol Studios in Hollywood. The musicians they chose for the album were basically the players from the orchestra of the Tonight Show with Johnny Carson, many of whom had also toured with the Kenton orchestra. The band for this recording is an all-star cast of jazz musicians based in Los Angeles during that time.

Ironically there was no music prepared even when both Dunstan and Baltazar had flown to Los Angeles for the recording. Don Menza had a whole book of leftover compositions and arrangements from an aborted set of recording sessions for Frank Rosolino; the trombone player had suddenly died in November 1978. Four of the seven charts for the Baltazar LP are from that earlier Rosolini/Menza collaboration that had never been recorded; Menza had also played in the Kenton sax section with Baltazar. The other three compositions and arrangements for the recording dates were obtained from another Kenton alum Bill Holman and Ángel Peña who Baltazar had first met in June 1969 in Hawaii.

The recording sessions were completed in the second week of January or 1979 at Capitol. There was no label lined up for the manufacturing and distribution for the record. Baltazar 'shopped' it to several companies, one of them being Herb Alpert at A&M Records; Alpert said "we don't do big band records anymore --- they do not sell." He eventually brought the recording to Stan Kenton at his office at Creative World Records in Los Angeles. Kenton was very happy with the product, "I'd be glad to endorse it." This would be the last of any albums the Creative World label would produce and also the last of the "Kenton presents..." series that had been started in the 1950s. Baltazar spoke with Kenton a week before his death in August 1979 and paid gratitude for both the 1979 album release and for his career as a jazz musician which Kenton was a key part of.

== Reception ==
Professional ratings
Review scores
Source	Rating
Allmusic	3.5/5 stars
NAJE Educator	4/5 stars

"Gabe Baltazar was one of the last significant soloists to graduate from the Stan Kenton Orchestra. Because he has spent much of his career living in Hawaii and has recorded relatively little, he has been underrated for the past 30 years. This out-of-print LP, his debut as a leader, features Baltazar's alto in front of a big band with strings, playing a program mostly arranged by Don Menza. It is a good but not quite definitive showcase for Gabe Baltazar, one of the few he has had on record as a leader to date."

Scott Yanow, Allmusic Guide

== Track listing ==
Track Listing

All tracks are written by : #1 #5–7 comp./arr. by Don Menza, #2 by Bill Holman, #3 and #4 by Ángel Peña, strings on #4 by Chuck Hoover.

No.	Title	Length
1.	"When Johnny Comes Marching Home"	3:35
2.	"What's New?"	5:56
3.	"Gabe"	4:00
4.	"A Time For Love"	5:03
5.	"Take the "A" Train"	4:22
6.	"Love Song"	6:40
7.	"Spanish Boots"	6:45
Total length:		39:13

== Recording sessions ==
Tracks 1–7 – January 9–11, 1979 in Hollywood, California at Capitol Studios

== Personnel ==
=== Musicians ===
- Contractor – Hy Lesnick
- Conductor – Don Menza
- Alto saxophone – Gabe Baltazar
- Saxes/reeds – Bud Shank, Bill Green, Jack Nimitz, Bob Cooper, Bill Perkins, Phil Ayling
- Trumpet – John Audino, Ray Triscari, Conte Candoli, John Madrid
- French horns – Vincent DeRosa, Richard Perissi, Art Maebe, George Price
- Trombone – Lloyde Ulyate, Tommy Shepard, Gil Falco
- Bass Trombone – George Roberts
- Piano – Pete Jolly
- Guitar – Tommy Tedesco
- Bass – Chuck Domonico
- Drums – Steve Schaeffer, John Guerin, Earl Palmer
- Percussion – Dale Anderson
- Violins – Jimmy Getzoff, Sid Sharp, Murray Adler, Alfred Lustgarten, Josef Scheonbrun, Bonnie Douglas, Jack Goodkin, Henry Roth
- Violas – Barbara Simons, Virginia Majewski
- Cellos – Ray Kelley, Igor Horoshevsky
- Harp – Dorothy Remsen

=== Production ===
- Producer: Wayne Dunstan
- Assistant producer: Bill Cole
- Engineer: Hugh Davies
- Mastering: Dave Ellsworth
- Cover photos: Courtney Harrington
- Graphics: Lexington Avenue West, Hollywood

== See also ==
- Gabe Baltazar
- Stan Kenton

== Bibliography ==
- Stan Kenton presents Gabe Baltazar (CD liner notes). Creative World Records. 1979.
- Garneau, Theo. If It Swings, It's Music: the Autobiography of Hawaiʻi's Gabe Baltazar Jr. Honolulu : University of Hawaiʻi Press, 2012.
- Harris, Stephen. The Kenton Kronicles Dynaflow Publications, Pasadena, CA. 2000.
- Sparke, Michael. Stan Kenton: This Is An Orchestra. University of North Texas Press. 2010.
- Quirino, Richie C. Mabuhay Jazz: Jazz in Postwar Philippines. Anvil Press. 2008.
