= A Merry Christmas! =

Studio album by Stan Kenton
- Released: 1961
- Recorded: February 21 and March 14 & 20, 1961; Goldwyn Studios, Hollywood, CA
- Genre: Jazz
- Label: Capitol T/ST 1621
- Producer: Lee Gillette

Stan Kenton chronology
| Kenton's West Side Story (1961) | A Merry Christmas! (1961) | The Sophisticated Approach (1961) |

A Merry Christmas! is an album of Christmas music by the Stan Kenton Orchestra recorded in 1961 and released by Capitol Records. It was reissued as Kenton's Christmas in 1970 by Kenton's own Creative World label.

== Reception ==
Professional ratings
Review scores
| Source | Rating |
|---|---|
| Allmusic | 4.5/5 stars |
| The Penguin Guide to Jazz Recordings | 3/4 stars |

The Allmusic review by Matt Collar noted A Merry Christmas is a polyphonic masterpiece that is at once progressive and traditional. ...Featuring Kenton's idiosyncratic style of arranging piercing trumpets over a wooly blanket of trombones and mellophones, this is beautiful, forward-thinking and angular music that addresses both complex classical harmony and Basie-style swing".

== Track listing ==
1. "O Tannenbaum" - 1:58
2. "The Holly and the Ivy" - 1:52
3. "We Three Kings of Orient Are" - 2:14
4. "Good King Wenceslas" - 1:45
5. "The Twelve Days of Christmas" - 4:07
6. "Once in Royal David's City" - 2:04
7. "God Rest Ye Merry Gentlemen" - 1:46
8. "O Come, All Ye Faithful" - 3:17
9. "Angels We Have Heard on High" - 2:11
10. "O Holy Night" - 2:10
11. "Christmas Medley: Joy to the World/Away in a Manger/The First Noel/We Wish You A Merry Christmas/Silent Night/Hark! The Herald Angels Sing" - 8:24
12. "What is Santa Claus?" - 2:12
- Recorded at Goldwyn Studios in Hollywood, CA on February 21, 1961 (tracks 7–11), March 14, 1961 (tracks 1, 3, 5 & 11) and March 20, 1961 (tracks 2, 4 & 6).

== Personnel ==
- Stan Kenton - piano, celeste, conductor
- Ernie Bernhardt (tracks 1, 3, 5 & 11), Bud Brisbois, Larry McGuire (tracks 2, 4 & 6), Bob Rolfe, Dalton Smith, Sanford Skinner - trumpet
- Bob Fitzpatrick, Paul Heydorff (tracks 1–6 & 11), Tommy Shepard (tracks 7–11) - trombone
- Jim Amlotte, Bob Knight (tracks 7–11), Dave Wheeler (tracks 1–6 & 11) - bass trombone
- Joe Burnett (tracks 7–11), Dwight Carver, Keith LaMotte (tracks 1–6 & 11), Gene Roland, Gordon Davison - mellophone
- Clive Acker (tracks 1–6 & 11), Albert Pollan (tracks 7–11), - tuba
- Pete Chivily - bass
- Artie Anton (tracks 1–7), Jerry McKenzie (tracks 1–6 & 11) - drums
- Larry Bunker - percussion
- Emil Richards - bells, percussion, vibraphone (tracks 1, 3, 5 & 11)
- Ralph Carmichael (tracks 1–7 & 9–11), Stan Kenton (track 8) - arranger
