= Sophisticated Approach =

Studio album by The Stan Kenton Orchestra
- Released: 1962
- Recorded: July 5 & 7, 1961
- Studio: Capitol (Hollywood)
- Genre: Jazz
- Label: Capitol T/ST 1674
- Producer: Lee Gillette

Stan Kenton chronology
| A Merry Christmas! (1961) | Sophisticated Approach (1962) | Adventures in Standards (1961) |

Sophisticated Approach is an album by the Stan Kenton Orchestra recorded in 1961 and released by Capitol Records. In 2006, Sophisticated Approach was digitally remastered and reissued on CD for the first time by Capitol Records/Blue Note Records and included six bonus tracks, including the non-album single, "Magic Moment".

== Reception ==
Professional ratings
Review scores
| Source | Rating |
|---|---|
| Allmusic | 3/5 stars |
| All About Jazz | 1/5 stars |

The Allmusic review by Ron Wynn noted "Sophisticated Approach features the ensemble when it was beginning to acquire a reputation for being more interested in structure and discipline than swing. The arrangements are tight, there's a minimum of solo space, and the songs are uneven". On All About Jazz Chris May said "Listening to Sophisticated Approach for more than about five minutes is an experience akin to having a sumo wrestler sit on your face. It isn't fun, it isn't jazz, and you need to come up for air".

== Track listing ==
1. "But Beautiful" (Jimmy Van Heusen, Johnny Burke) - 3:18
2. "Darn That Dream" (Van Heusen, Eddie DeLange) - 2:12
3. "It Might As Well Be Spring" (Richard Rodgers, Oscar Hammerstein II) - 5:12
4. "Moonlight Becomes You" (Van Heusen, Burke) - 3:50
5. "How Do I Look In Blue" (Gene Roland, Johnny Richards) - 2:50
6. "You Stepped Out of a Dream" (Nacio Herb Brown, Gus Kahn) - 2:52
7. "How Long Has This Been Going On?" (George Gershwin, Ira Gershwin) - 4:32
8. "Memoirs of a Lady" (Richards, Blanca Webb) - 2:48
9. "Time After Time" (Jule Styne, Sammy Cahn) - 4:16
10. "Easy to Love" (Cole Porter) - 2:53
11. "My One and Only Love" (Guy Wood, Robert Mellin) - 2:37
12. "Like Someone in Love" (Van Heusen, Burke) - 4:35
- Recorded at Capitol Studios in Hollywood, CA on July 5, 1961 (tracks 1–7 & 12) and July 7, 1961 (tracks 8–11).
- In 2006, Sophisticated Approach was digitally remastered and reissued on CD with the bonus tracks:

13. "Some Enchanted Evening" (R. Rogers, O. Hammerstein) - 3:27

14. "Make Someone Happy" (Styne, Comden, Green) - 3:09

15. "Come Rain or Come Shine" (H. Arlen, J. Mercer) - 2:29

16. "Gigi" (A. J. Lerner, F. Lowe) - 2:59

17. "Bewitched, Bothered, and Bewildered" (R. Rogers, L. Hart) - 2:32

18. "Magic Moment" (H, Dietz, A. Schwartz) - 2:56

- Recorded at Capitol Studios in Hollywood, CA on December 5, 6 & 12, 1961

== Personnel ==
- Stan Kenton - piano, conductor
- Bob Behrendt, Bud Brisbois, Dalton Smith, Bob Rolfe - trumpet
- Bob Fitzpatrick, Bud Parker, Jack Spurlock - trombone
- Jim Amlotte - bass trombone
- Dave Wheeler - bass trombone, tuba
- Dwight Carver, Keith LaMotte, Gene Roland, Carl Saunders - mellophone
- Gabe Baltazar - alto saxophone
- Sam Donahue, Paul Renzi - tenor saxophone
- Marvin Holladay - baritone saxophone
- Wayne Dunstan - baritone saxophone, bass saxophone
- Red Mitchell - bass
- Jerry McKenzie - drums
- Lennie Niehaus - arranger
