= Buddy Arnold =

American jazz saxophonist (1926–2003)

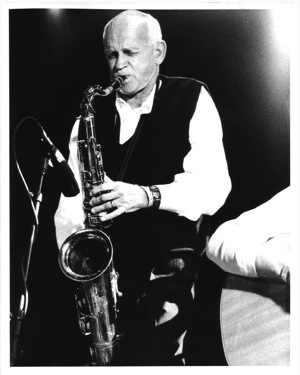

Background information
- Born: Arnold Buddy Grishaver; April 30, 1926; Bronx, New York
- Died: November 9, 2003 (aged 77) New York
- Genres: Swing, jazz
- Occupation: Musician
- Instrument(s): Saxophone, clarinet, flute
- Formerly of: Joe Marsala, Stan Kenton

Arnold Buddy Grishaver (April 30, 1926 – November 9, 2003), known professionally as Buddy Arnold, was an American jazz saxophonist.

== Career ==
Arnold took up the sax at age nine and turned pro while still in his teens. At 16 years old, Arnold performed at the Apollo Theater with the Georgie Auld Orchestra with singer Billy Eckstine. At age 18 he joined the Army and led an Army Dance Band from 1944 to 1946. Following this he played with Joe Marsala, Will Osborne (singer), Herbie Fields, Buddy Rich. His first recordings were in 1949 with Gene Williams and the Junior Thornhill Band with Claude Thornhill before leaving to study music and economics at Columbia University. In 1951 he began playing again, touring with Buddy DeFranco, then worked with Jerry Wald, Tex Beneke, Elliot Lawrence, Stan Kenton, and Neal Hefti. His debut album as a leader, Wailing, was released by ABC-Paramount Records in 1956. He did further work for the label with Phil Sunkel.

Arnold's career was sporadic after the mid-1950s, due in part to drug addiction. In 1958, he was imprisoned for attempted burglary but returned in 1960 after his sentence ended to play, record and tour with the Stan Kenton Orchestra and the Tommy Dorsey ghost band. In the 1970s his old habits returned. In 1977 he was arrested in Pasadena, California, for forging prescriptions. In 2003, he died of complications from open-heart surgery at Cedars-Sinai Medical Center.

== Musicians Assistance Program ==
In the 1980s, he dropped out of music due to multiple prison sentences stemming from his addictions; upon his release he co-founded, with his second wife, Carole Fields (and the assistance of John Branca), an organization called the Musicians' Assistance Program or MAP for musicians with drug abuse problems. The program has helped many musicians from every era of music. In 2004, MusiCares acquired MAP and merged the two programs under the MusiCares banner.

== Discography ==
=== As leader ===
- Wailing (ABC-Paramount Records, 1956)

=== As sideman ===
- Tito Puente, Mambos Vol. 5 & King of the Mambo, Vol. 6 (Tico, 1953)
- Phil Sunkel's Jazz Band, Every Morning I Listen To . . . . Phil Sunkel's Jazz Band (ABC-Paramount, 1956)
- Stan Kenton, Adventures in Jazz (Capitol, 1961)
- Stan Kenton, Adventures in Standards (Creative World, 1961)
- Stan Kenton, Adventures in Blues (Capitol, 1963)
