= Danny Barcelona =

American drummer

- Also known as: The Little Filipino Boy
- Born: July 23, 1929; Waipahu, Hawaii
- Died: April 1, 2007 (aged 77) Monterey Park, California
- Genres: Dixieland, jazz
- Occupation: Musician
- Instrument: Drums

Danny Barcelona (July 23, 1929 – April 1, 2007) was an American jazz drummer best known for his years with Louis Armstrong's All-Stars. He was a Filipino-American born in Waipahu, Hawaii, a community of Honolulu, Hawaii. He was also frequently introduced to audiences by Armstrong as "The Little Filipino Boy." Armstrong usually followed up by calling himself "the little Arabian boy."

== Career ==
At the age of 18 and in his final year in high school, Barcelona was already playing music with trombonist, singer, and bandleader Trummy Young. Barcelona was a self-taught percussionist. Young and Barcelona met in the mid-1940s. Danny Barcelona was introduced to Louis Armstrong by Young in 1956 and became Armstrong's drummer for 15 years. A native Hawaiian, Barcelona had joined Young's Hawaii All-Stars in the early 1950s, later assuming leadership of the band – a sextet known as the Hawaiian Dixieland All-Stars – when Young left to join Louis Armstrong's combo in 1952. Barcelona toured around the Hawaiian Islands, Japan, and the rest of the Far East. In the fall of 1957, Barcelona moved to New York City. Barcelona, again through Trummy Young's recommendation, formally joined Armstrong's All-Stars band in February 1958 to replace retiring drummer Barrett Deems. Barcelona appears on more than 130 of Armstrong's recordings. Barcelona was only 27 years old when he was introduced by Young to Armstrong.

Barcelona's recording career with Armstrong included the jazz music hits "Hello, Dolly!" (1964) and "What a Wonderful World" (1968). With Armstrong and Young, Barcelona traveled the world, including trips to Denmark, Germany, and Rhodesia, Africa. Barcelona's drumming style was described by T. Dennis Brown in The New Grove Dictionary of Jazz as being "characterized by extensive use of the ride cymbal, crisp, clean fills and breaks, and solos that exploit asymmetrical phrasing". After Armstrong's illness in 1971 and his death on July 6 of that year, Barcelona returned to Hawaii and became a longtime performer at the Hilton Hawaiian Village Hotel, where he played with Bernie Halmann and Melveen Leed. He also worked for many years at Harry's Music Store and the Easy Music Center. In 1979, Barcelona returned to the mainland and settled with his family in Monterey Park, California.

== Personal ==
Barcelona died in Monterey Park, California on Sunday, April 1, 2007, due to complications from cancer at the age of 77. He was survived by his wife Dee Barcelona; his two daughters, Dana Barcelona-Bonner and Jodi Barcelona; his brother, Jose "Sonny" Barcelona; five grandchildren; and one great grandchild. His wife Dee was once a member of the Morgan Sisters singing trio. Danny Barcelona and Dee Thrasher met while the latter was performing with her two sisters at the Waikiki Hotel. Barcelona's contemporary players in the jazz music industry at the time were Gabe Baltazar, Frank Kamano, Porkie Britto (b) and Bobby Kamano.

== See also ==
- Gabe Baltazar
- Overseas Filipino
