= Pat Senatore =

American jazz bassist (1935–2026)

- Born: August 19, 1935; Newark, New Jersey, U.S.
- Died: September 8, 2026 (aged 91)
- Genres: Jazz
- Occupation: Musician
- Instrument: Bass
- Website: patsenatore.com

Pat Senatore (August 19, 1935 – September 8, 2026) was an American jazz bassist born in Newark, New Jersey.

== Life and career ==
Pat Senatore was born on August 19, 1935. He attended the Juilliard School of Music in New York for two years but left because it did not offer jazz at that time. Senatore then toured the country with the Stan Kenton Orchestra and recorded Adventures in Blues, and Adventures In Jazz at Capitol Records. He was the bassist for Herb Alpert and the Tijuana Brass from mid-1965 through 1969. Senatore produced CD's for Hi-Brite and Moo Records including: two volumes of the VIP Trio with Cedar Walton, Billy Higgins and himself; Pasquale, with himself, Billy Childs, Billy Higgins, Paul Hanson (bassoon), Pedro Eustache (flute), Mike Barone (trombone), featuring several of his original compositions.

Senatore was the artistic director for Herb Alpert's Vibrato Grill Jazz in Bel Air, CA, where he performed regularly.

Senatore died on September 8, 2026, at the age of 91.

== Selected discography ==
=== As a leader ===
- Pasquale (Moo, 1997)
- Ascensione (Fresh Sounds, 2008)

=== As sideman ===
- Stan Kenton: 1961–1964; Albums included Adventures in Standards Adventures in Blues, Adventures In Jazz on Capitol Records
- Herb Alpert and the Tijuana Brass: 1964–1968; Albums included South of the Border, SRO, Herb Alpert's Ninth, Christmas Album, all on the A&M Records label
- Cedar Walton: 1988–1991; Standard Album (Vol 2) on Hi Brite
