= Tommy Shepard =

American trombonist (1923–1993)

Shepard, c. 1969

Thomas M. Shepard (March 31, 1923 – February 23, 1993) was an American trombonist who worked extensively in both Chicago and Hollywood as a regular recording artist for the top recording, television, and film studios. He had a trombone sound that was often compared to Tommy Dorsey. Shepard is also known as a photographer, who took behind-the-scenes photographs of many of the top entertainers of the 1960s.

== Biography ==
Tommy Shepard began playing trombone in his junior year in high school. The next year he won a national solo contest and by the time he was 19 he was on the road with the Ben Bernie Orchestra. After twelve months with Ben Bernie, he enlisted in the United States Army and played in a variety of Army big bands, finally winding up with Wayne King's Orchestra at Fort Sheridan, Illinois, where he played for two years, making V-Discs, working bond rallies and generally supporting the nation's spirits.

Released from service in 1946, he settled down in Chicago working first at the Chez Paree, then on the staff of the orchestras at NBC, ABC, and finally CBS.

While he was at ABC, Shepard was granted six months leave of absence in 1953 to join Stan Kenton on first trombone (his section mates were Frank Rosolino and Bill Russo). The invitation to join Kenton came as a direct result of a rehearsal band that Shepard had formed in 1948. It was a big swinging band that gave some of the top studio musicians in Chicago a chance to perform once a week. Shepard kept the band going until 1953 when he went with Kenton.

In 1960, Shepard started working in Hollywood and quickly became one of the city's busiest free-lance studio trombone players. He was a regular recording artist for Capitol Records, Reprise Records, and Verve Records during this time. He was also part of the house band for The Hollywood Palace television show, The Joey Bishop Show (1967–1969 talk show), and worked in many Hollywood film orchestras.

During 1963, Shepard began to document his time working in the Hollywood studios with his camera. His photography brought a new perspective to an era of American music that would end with the British Invasion. His photographs were eventually donated to University of Arizona's School of Music in 2005, where his collection now resides.

In the 1970s, Shepard began leading his own orchestra again, which performed for numerous events in southern California. He also contracted for the Nelson Riddle Orchestra – when Nelson Riddle was unavailable – and led the Nelson Riddle Alumni Orchestra after Riddle's passing. Shepard continued to lead his own orchestra until succumbing to a heart attack, at his home in Indian Wells, California, in 1993. His remains were interred at Coachella Valley Public Cemetery in Coachella, California.

== Discography ==
- Shepard's Flock (Coral Records, 1957)

With Stan Kenton

- Portraits on Standards (Capitol, 1953)
- The Kenton Era (Capitol, 1940–54, [1955])
- A Merry Christmas! (Capitol, 1961)
- Kenton / Wagner (Capitol, 1964)
- Hair (Capitol, 1969)
