= Carl Saunders =

American jazz trumpeter, composer, and educator (1942–2023)

- Born: August 2, 1942; Indianapolis, Indiana, U.S.
- Died: February 25, 2023 (aged 80) Burbank, California, U.S.
- Genres: Jazz
- Instrument: Trumpet
- Relatives: Bobby Sherwood (uncle); Dave Pell (uncle)

Carl Saunders (August 2, 1942 – February 25, 2023) was an American jazz trumpeter, composer, and educator who performed with such luminaries as Stan Kenton, Buddy Rich, Bill Holman, Clare Fischer, Frank Sinatra, Ella Fitzgerald, Mel Tormé, and Paul Anka.

== Career ==
Born in Indianapolis, Indiana, Saunders' first five years performing were mostly spent on the road. His uncle was trumpeter Bobby Sherwood, who led the popular Sherwood Orchestra that had hits such as "Elks Parade" and "Sherwood's Forest." Saunders's mother Gail (Bobby's sister) sang for the Sherwood Orchestra and Stan Kenton. When Saunders was five, he and his mother settled in Los Angeles, living with his aunt Caroline and her husband, saxophonist Dave Pell. Saunders heard records by the Dave Pell Octet and was influenced by the style and phrasing of trumpeter Don Fagerquist.

Saunders began playing trumpet in the seventh grade and discovered that he had a natural ability, learning to play by ear without ever having lessons. He played in school bands, and after graduating from high school got a job with Stan Kenton's Orchestra. He auditioned for Kenton's band and was given a choice: wait for the first opening in the trumpet section or join the band the following week as a member of the mellophonium section. He chose the latter and spent much of 1961–62 on the road with Kenton. Saunders has said about the experience with the mellophonium band, "I was developing perfect pitch from playing the trumpet. However, once I joined Kenton to play the mellophone, my whole system got mixed up because the trumpet is in Bb and the mellophonium is in F, so needless to say my confidence in perfect pitch was shaken and I ended up with relative pitch."

After spending part of 1962 and 1963 traveling and playing drums with Bobby Sherwood's group, Saunders settled in Las Vegas where, over the next twenty years, he played lead trumpet while performing with Ella Fitzgerald, Tony Bennett, and Frank Sinatra. He traveled as a lead player with Paul Anka and Robert Goulet and worked with Si Zentner, Harry James, Maynard Ferguson, Benny Goodman, and Charlie Barnet.

In 1984, Saunders moved to Los Angeles where he was soon playing lead trumpet with Bill Holman's Orchestra. He has also worked with Supersax, the big bands of Bob Florence and Gerald Wilson, and the Phil Norman Tentet. In 1994, he became a member of the Dave Pell Octet (in Don Fagerquist's old chair). In addition, he was often heard at the head of his own groups.

Saunders died on February 25, 2023, at the age of 80.

== Discography ==
- 1995 Out of the Blue
- 2000 Eclecticism
- 2002 Be Bop Big Band
- 2003 Salute to Chet Baker
- 2004 The Carl Saunders Sextet: Live in Union Square
- 2004 Plays Henry Mancini
- 2005 Can You Dig Being Dug?
- 2007 The Lost Bill Holman Charts
- 2014 America
- 2020 Jazz Trumpet

With Bernie Dresel's BBB

- Live N' Bernin' (Monster Music, 2016)
- Bern Bern Bern (DIG-IT. 2018)
- The Pugilist (DIG-IT, 2021)

With Stan Kenton

- Sophisticated Approach (Capitol, 1961)
- Adventures in Blues (Capitol, 1961)
- Stan Kenton! Tex Ritter! (Capitol, 1962) with Tex Ritter
- Adventures In Jazz (Capitol, 1963)

With Gerald Wilson

- Theme for Monterey (MAMA, 1998)
