= Paul Tobey =

Canadian jazz pianist

- Origin: Canada
- Genre: Jazz
- Occupations: Pianist, producer, arranger, composer, director
- Instrument: Piano
- Website: www.paultobey.com

Paul Tobey is a Canadian jazz pianist, as well as a producer, arranger, composer, and director.

He has toured and recorded with Terry Clark, Jim Vivian, Pat Labarbera, and Alex Dean. He has headlined in 16 countries and toured Canada several times, including a University bound tour to promote jazz education. In 2006, Tobey made his debut with symphony, launching the Road to Santiago Suite, 9 movements for piano and symphony. He was the first Canadian to sign with Arkadia.

Tobey has been nominated for a Juno Award for Best Jazz Contemporary Album, and has won several awards including Jazz Album of the Year, Pianist of the Year, and the IAJE Award for Service to Jazz Education. He has also been awarded several cash awards for touring, composition, recording etc. from prestigious entities such as Canada Council for the Arts, The Foundation to Assist Canadian Talent on Record, Ontario Arts Council and Canadian Heritage.

Partnered with the Expositor (an Osprey Media Newspaper) in 2006, Tobey lends his talents to an annual "Christmas Traditions" songbook and sing-a-long CD in support of the Sunshine Dreams for Kids.

Tobey is also a strong advocate creating awareness of preventable tinnitus, educating people against hearing loss and ear damage. In 2004 he launched his book Tinnitus Free Living, which includes audio downloads and workbooks.

== Discography ==
- 2007 Paul Tobey: The Road to Santiago Suite Produced by Pilgrim Productions Incorporated

Movements for Piano and Symphony Produced, Composed and Symphony arrangements Paul Tobey Supported by Canada Council for the Arts

- 2006 Paul Tobey: Live at the Glenn Gould Theatre

Produced by Pilgrim Productions Incorporated Solo Piano Supported by Ontario Arts Council

- 2005 Paul Tobey: Christmas at the Piano

Produced by Pilgrim Productions Incorporated Supported by Ontario Arts Council Recorded in Toronto Live Nov.23/2005 Featuring: Paul Tobey on Piano Bass: Henry Heilig Drums: Steve Heathcoate Percussion: Dave Simpson Keyboard: Phil Gray Flute/Alto: Don Englert Engineered: Michael Jack Assistant: Matt Smith

- 2003 Paul Tobey: Live at the Sanderson Centre

Produced by Pilgrim Productions Incorporated Piano: Paul Tobey Keyboards: Douglas Romanow Alto Sax & Flute: Roy Styffe Bass: Russ Boswell Drums: Gary Craig Guests: Arcady Strings featuring Kenin McKay, Jennifer Hedican, Lucy-Ana Gaston Brant County Youth Singers Choir Director: Doreen Janzen & Lisa Dawdy Kennette Live in Concert Produced by Bruce Davidson, Tanglewood Productions Recording Produced by :Paul Tobey

- 2001 Paul Tobey: Street Culture (Arkadia Jazz)

Juno Nominated Paul Tobey Piano Mike Murley - Tenor Jim Vivian - Bass Terry Clarke - Drums Supported by Canada Council for the Arts

- 1998 Paul Tobey: Wayward

Produced by JazzSol Records Distribution FusionIII Montreal Featuring Musicians: Alex Dean, Pat LaBarbera, John Johnson, John MacLeod, Sandy Barter, Terry Promane, Rob Somerville, Roy Patterson, Neil Swainson, Roberto Occhipinti, Mark McLean, Armando Borg Supported by FACTOR

- 1994 Paul Tobey: Orpheus

Produced by JazzSol Records Solo Piano Featuring: Paul Tobey on Piano Bass: Steve Holy Drums: Jim Hillman Guitar: Pierre Cote
