= Sam Donahue =

American jazz saxophonist, trumpeter, and arranger

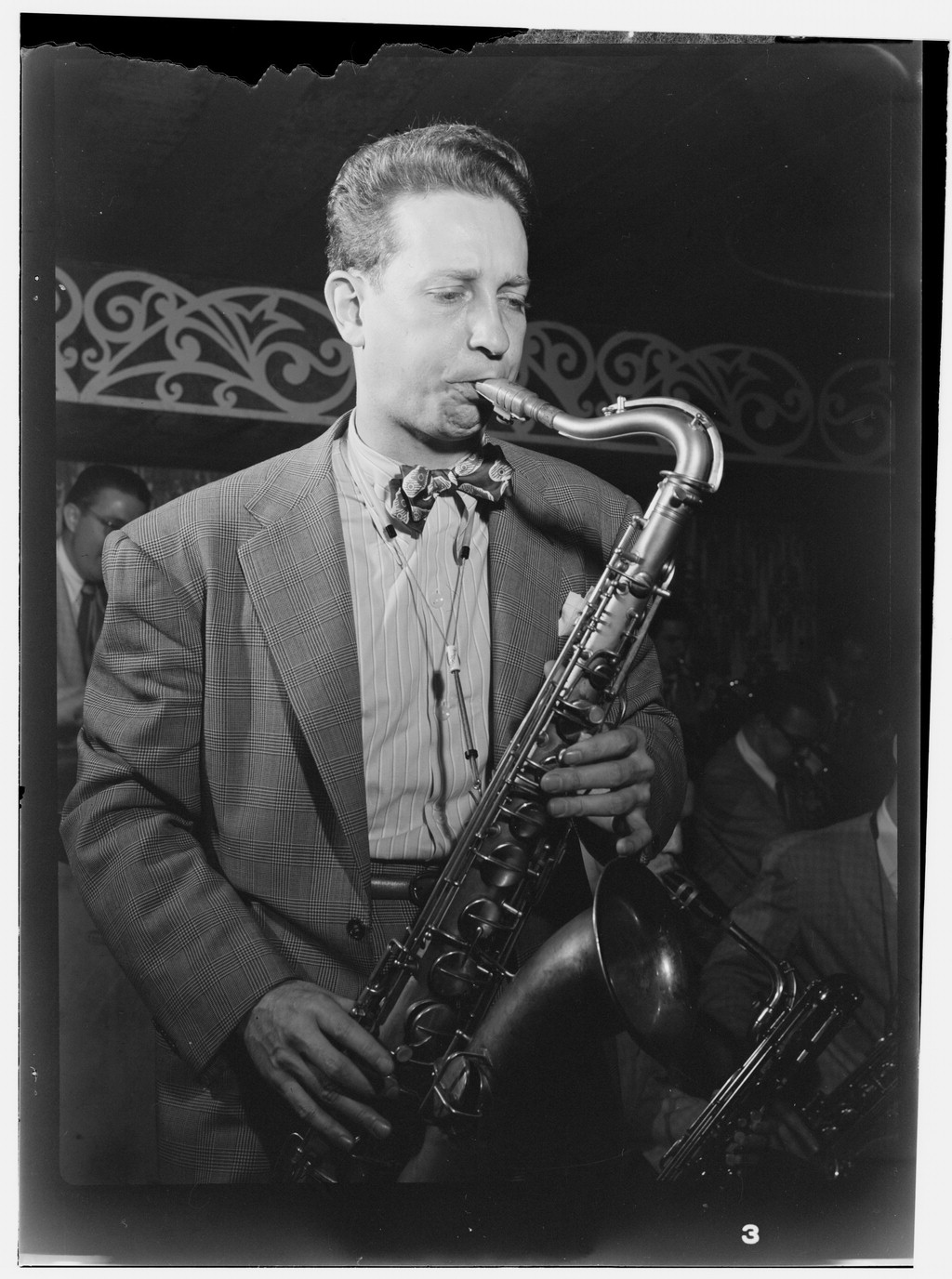
- At the Aquarium in New York City, c. December 1946

Background information
- Born: Samuel Koontz Donahue; March 18, 1918; Detroit, Michigan, U.S.
- Died: March 22, 1974 (aged 56) Reno, Nevada, U.S.
- Genres: Jazz
- Occupation: Musician
- Instruments: Saxophone, trumpet

Samuel Koontz Donahue (March 18, 1918 – March 22, 1974) was an American jazz saxophonist, trumpeter, and musical arranger. He performed with Gene Krupa, Tommy Dorsey, Benny Goodman, Billy May, Woody Herman, and Stan Kenton.

== Biography ==
Donahue was born in Detroit, Michigan, United States. He put together his first band when he was only 15 years old. Donahue played in the bands of Gene Krupa, Harry James, and Benny Goodman. During World War II, Donahue took over the US Navy band of Artie Shaw. Marc Myers of JazzWax stated that “Donahue's Navy Band was easily one of the most swinging bands of the war.” After the war, he assembled and led a group that recorded “extensively” for Capitol Records. Trumpeters Harry Gozzard and Doc Severinsen, Wayne Herdell, arranger Leo Reisman and vocalists Frances Wayne and Jo Stafford were some of the members included in the new band. It dissolved in 1951 when Donahue re-enlisted in the Navy to serve in the Korean War.

It is mentioned in Donahue’s IMDb bio and also in an UPROXX article that Frank Sinatra Jr. was a vocalist for Donahue. According to a DownBeat article, “he began performing in his mid-teens for the Sam Donahue band.” Sinatra later mentioned that the majority of what he learned about singing was learned through the time he spent with Donahue and the other musicians in the band. Sinatra Jr. was kidnapped in Lake Tahoe while on tour with Donahue. His father Frank Sinatra paid the $240,000 ransom which ultimately led to his son’s release from the kidnappers.

Donahue was married to actress Patricia Donahue and was the father of rock guitarist Jerry Donahue known for his work with Fairport Convention and Fotheringay. Donahue featured alongside his son on the album, Fotheringay 2 released in 2008 some years after that group's disbandment.

His compositions included "Quiet and Roll 'Em" with Gene Krupa, "Convoy" released as V-Disc No. 610B, "LST Party" released as V-Disc No. 573A in January, 1946, with the Navy Dance Band, "Scuttlin'", "Love Scene", "Please Get Us Out", "Root Toot", "Constellation", "Conversation at Lindy's", "Saxa-Boogie", and "Saxophone Sam".

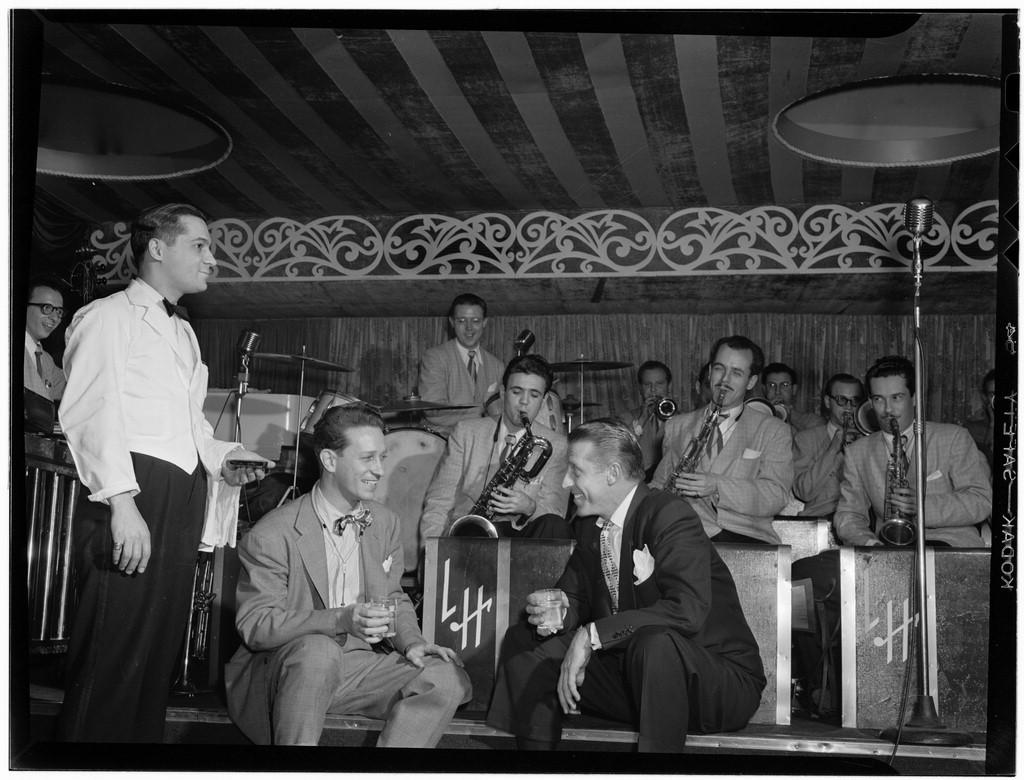
Donahue, left, talking with Stan Kenton at the Aquarium in NYC, 1946. He later worked with Kenton, performing in two album recordings that won Grammy Awards.

"I’ll Never Tire of You" is a 1941 song written by Richard Kollmar, Cy Walter and Jimmy Dobson. It was recorded in New York City on November 12, 1941, by Donahue and his orchestra as a RCA Victor - Bluebird 78 rpm single. Andy Blaine was the sole vocalist. The song is featured in The Sam Donahue Collection 1940-48 on Acrobat Records. Marketing and distribution for the album was handled by Arista Records. An article in Jazz Journal featured that reissue album; which has a majority of Donahue’s songs from the 1940s. Online music database AllMusic also highlighted that album on their website. Trapeze Music & Entertainment Limited, an independent label and distributor with a loyal customer base in the UK, US and throughout mainland Europe, highlighted a quote in their reviews (borrowed from Jazzviews March 2021) by Derek Ansell, a regular contributor to Jazz Journal, stating, “Although these pieces vary tremendously from track to track the music is all well played and shines a spotlight on a musician who really deserved to be much better known than he was.” In an article in The Syncopated Times, Scott Yanow, who has written for DownBeat, JazzTimes, AllMusic, Cadence, Coda and the Los Angeles Times, stated, regarding the collection of Donahue’s songs, that “it is a pity that it could not have been a three-CD set that included everything” that he recorded during 1940-48. Yanow also voiced his opinion in that article regarding the musical skills of Donahue and his band members, stating that “the musicianship is consistently excellent.” The songs from that album are listed in the Spotify and Apple Music listening databases.

Donahue died from pancreatic cancer on March 22, 1974.

== Discography ==
=== As leader ===
- For Young Moderns in Love (Capitol, 1954)
- Classics in Jazz (Capitol, 1955)
- Dance Date With Sam Donahue (Remington, 1957)
- Stop Look Go And Listen To Sam Donahue (Prescott, 1958)
- Convoy (Hep, 1994)
- LST Party (Hep, 1994)
- Hollywood Hop (Hep, 2000)
- Take Five (Hep, 2002)
- The Sam Donahue Collection 1940-48 (Acrobat, 2021)

=== As sideman ===
With Stan Kenton

- Cuban Fire! (Capitol, 1956; CD: 1991)
- Adventures in Jazz (Capitol, 1961)
- Kenton's West Side Story (Capitol, 1961)
- The Romantic Approach (Capitol, 1961)
- Sophisticated Approach (Capitol, 1962)
- Adventures in Blues (Capitol, 1963)
- Together Again (First Heard, 1982)
- Mellophonium Magic (Status, 1989)

With others

- Will Bradley/Johnny Guarnieri, Live Echoes of the Best in Big Band Boogie (RCA Camden, 1974)
- Cab Calloway, Hi De Hi De Ho (RCA, 1960)
- Woody Herman, The Herd Rides Again (Everest, 1958)
- Gene Krupa, Gene Krupa's Sidekicks (Columbia, 1955)
- Vic Lewis, Volume 1: The War Years (Harlequin, 1986)
