= Gene Roland =

American jazz composer (1921–1982)

Gene Roland (September 15, 1921 – August 11, 1982) was an American jazz musician, composer, and arranger who contributed richly to American jazz, especially through his work with the Stan Kenton Orchestra. Born in Dallas, Texas, he played multiple instruments, including the trumpet, trombone, and saxophone, and collaborated with musicians including Count Basie and Dizzy Gillespie. Roland was pivotal in defining the unique 'Four Brothers' sound that influenced big band jazz. Throughout his career, he contributed groundbreaking arrangements and compositions for many major bands, performing globally and working with Denmark's Radiohus Orchestra.

== Life and work ==
Roland, who gained a degree in music from the University of North Texas College of Music, first met Kenton in 1944, playing fifth trumpet and contributing arrangements. He worked briefly with Lionel Hampton and Lucky Millinder and then rejoined Kenton in 1945, this time as a trombonist and writer (he arranged the hit "Tampico").

Roland played piano and wrote for a group in 1946 that included Stan Getz, Zoot Sims, Jimmy Giuffre and Herbie Steward and would lead to Woody Herman's Four Brothers Second Herd. In the late 1940s, Roland played trombone with Georgie Auld, trumpet with Count Basie, Charlie Barnet and Lucky Millinder and contributed charts for the big bands of Claude Thornhill and Artie Shaw. After leading a giant rehearsal band in 1950 that included Dizzy Gillespie and Charlie Parker, Roland wrote for Kenton in 1951, Dan Terry in 1954, and Woody Herman from 1956 to 1958, for whom he contributed 65 arrangements. Roland was a major force in Kenton's mellophonium band of the early 1960s, not only writing for the ensemble but performing as one of the mellophoniums; he also occasionally doubled on soprano sax with the orchestra.

Roland remained active as a writer in the 1960s and 1970s, working with the Radiohus Orchestra in Copenhagen (1967) and contributing charts to Kenton as well as Dan Terry's D.T.B.B.B. album (Metronome Records, 1981); he also played trumpet, piano and tenor with his own groups. In addition to writing an entire album for Kenton, Roland led his 1950 rehearsal band on a Spotlite release (Parker is one of his sidemen), led half of an album (recorded in 1957 and 1959) for Dawn Records in which he plays trumpet, and arranged a 1963 octet record for Brunswick Records.

He died in New York on August 11, 1982, at the age of 60.

== Discography ==
=== As leader ===
- Jazzville Vol. 4 (Dawn, 1957)

=== As sideman ===
With Stan Kenton

- Stan Kenton Classics (Capitol, 1952)
- The Kenton Era (Capitol, 1955)
- A Merry Christmas! (Capitol, 1961)
- Kenton's West Side Story (Capitol, 1961)
- The Romantic Approach in the Ballad Style of Stan Kenton (Capitol, 1961)
- Sophisticated Approach (Capitol, 1962)
- Stan Kenton! Tex Ritter! (Capitol, 1962)
- Adventures in Blues (Capitol, 1963)
- The Uncollected Stan Kenton and His Orchestra 1944-1945 Vol. 4 (Hindsight, 1979)

With others

- June Christy, June Time (Swing House, 1981)
- Stan Getz, Zoot Sims, Paul Quinichette, Wardell Grey, Tenors Anyone? (Dawn, 1958)
- Jimmy Knepper, A Swinging Introduction to Jimmy Knepper (Bethlehem 1957)
- Lucky Millinder, Cab Calloway, Awful Natural (RCA, 1977)
- Rita Reys, Sylvia Pierce & Peggy Serra, New Voices (Dawn, 1957)
- Tom Talbert, 1946–1949 (Sea Breeze, 1995)
