= Marvin Stamm =

American jazz trumpeter (born 1939)

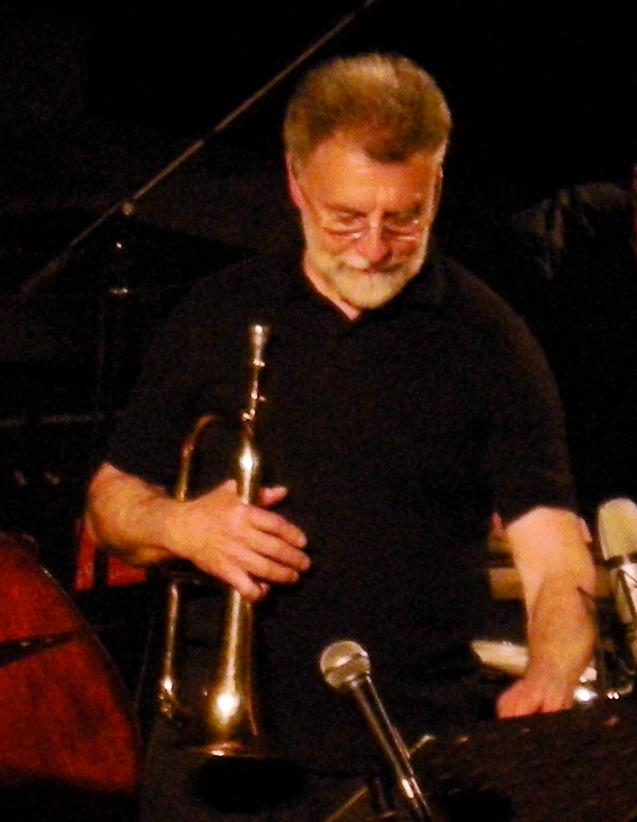
- Marvin Stamm in 2008

Background information
- Born: Marvin Louis Stamm; May 23, 1939 (age 87); Memphis, Tennessee, U.S.
- Genres: Jazz
- Occupation: Musician
- Instrument: Trumpet
- Website: www.marvinstamm.com

Marvin Louis Stamm (born May 23, 1939) is an American jazz trumpeter.

== Career ==
Stamm was born in Memphis, Tennessee, United States. Stamm began on trumpet at age twelve. He attended North Texas State University, where he was a member of the One O'Clock Lab Band. He was a member of Stan Kenton's Mellophonium Orchestra from 1961 to 1963, then worked with Woody Herman from 1965 to 1966. Following this he was with The Thad Jones/Mel Lewis Orchestra from 1966 to 1972 and with Benny Goodman from 1974 to 1975.

In the 1970s, he began a decades-long career as a prolific studio and session musician. In the studio he has recorded with Paul McCartney, Average White Band, Bill Evans, Quincy Jones, Donald Fagen, Oliver Nelson, Duke Pearson, Wes Montgomery, Freddie Hubbard, Stanley Turrentine, Grover Washington, Jr., Patrick Williams, Michel Legrand, Lena Horne, Frank Foster, Paul Desmond, Frankie Valli, Deodato, Les DeMerle, and George Benson. He played the flugelhorn solo on "Uncle Albert/Admiral Halsey" by Paul McCartney.

In the 1980s, he played with John Lewis's American Jazz Orchestra, the Bob Mintzer Band, the George Gruntz Concert Jazz Band (1987), Louie Bellson's Big Band and the band of composer Maria Schneider. He has been a member of the Westchester Jazz Orchestra since 2002.

== Discography ==
=== As leader ===
- Machinations (Verve, 1968)
- Stammpede (Palo Alto, 1983)
- Bop Boy (Musicmasters, 1991)
- Mystery Man (MusicMasters, 1993)
- By Ourselves (Marstam, 2000)
- Elegance (TNC, 2001)
- The Nearness of Two with Dena DeRose (GoFour, 2007)

=== As sideman ===
With American Jazz Orchestra

- Central City Sketches (MusicMasters, 1987)
- Ellington Masterpieces (EastWest 1989)
- The Music of Jimmie Lunceford (MusicMasters, 1991)

With Average White Band

- AWB (Atlantic, 1974)
- Soul Searching (Atlantic, 1976)
- Benny and Us (Atlantic, 1977)
- Warmer Communications (Atlantic, 1978)

With Louie Bellson

- Breakthrough! (Project 3, 1968)
- Airmail Special (MusicMasters, 1990)
- Peaceful Thunder (Jazz Heritage, 1993)
- Live from New York (Telarc, 1994)

With Luiz Bonfa

- Manhattan Strut (Paddle Wheel, 1997)
- Jacaranda (JSR, 1998)
- Black Orpheus Impressions (Sony, 2000)
- The New Face of Bonfa (RCA, 2003)

With Eumir Deodato

- Prelude (CTI, 1973)
- Deodato 2 (CTI, 1973)
- Very Together (MCA, 1976)
- Whirlwinds (MCA, 1974)
- Eumir Deodato Plays Marcos Valle: Summer Samba (Irma, 2002)
- Os Catedraticos 73 (Ubatuqui, 1998)

With The Free Design

- Heaven/Earth (Project 3, 1969)
- Kites Are Fun (Project 3, 1967)
- Stars/Time/Bubbles/Love (Project 3, 1970)

With George Gruntz

- Happening Now! (TCB, 1988)
- First Prize (Enja, 1989)
- Blues 'n' Dues et Cetera (Enja, 1991)
- Sins 'n' Wins 'n' Funs, Left-cores and Hard-core En-cores (TCB, 1996)
- Liebermann (TCB, 1999)
- Merryteria (TCB, 1999)
- Global Excellence (TCB, 2001)
- Tiger by the Tail (TCB, 2006)
- Pourquoi Pas? Why Not? (TCB, 2008)

With Freddie Hubbard

- Sky Dive (CTI, 1972)
- Polar AC (CTI, 1975)
- The Baddest Hubbard (CTI, 1975)
- Windjammer (Columbia, 1976)

With Bob James

- One (CTI, 1974)
- Two (CTI, 1975)
- Three (CTI, 1976)
- Heads (Tappan Zee/Columbia, 1977)
- Hands Down (CBS/(Sony, 1982)
- The Genie (Tappan Zee/Columbia, 1983)
- 12 (Tappan Zee/Columbia, 1984)

With Quincy Jones

- Walking in Space (A&M/CTI, 1969)
- Gula Matari (A&M/CTI, 1970)
- Smackwater Jack (A&M, 1971)
- I Heard That!! (A&M, 1976)
- The Original Jam Sessions 1969 (Concord, 2004)
- Summer in the City (Verve, 2007)

With The Thad Jones/Mel Lewis Orchestra

- Live at the Village (Vanguard, 1967)
- Consummation (Blue Note, 1970)
- Suite for Pops (A&M, 1975)
- Thad Jones/Mel Lewis (Blue Note, 1975)
- Village Vanguard Live Sessions (LaserLight, 1997)
- The Groove Merchant (LaserLight, 1999)
- The Second Race (LaserLight, 1999)

With Stan Kenton

- Adventures in Blues (Capitol, 1963)
- Adventures in Jazz (Capitol, 1961)
- Adventures in Time (Capitol, 1962)
- Sophisticated Approach (Capitol, 1962)
- Sound '62 (Air Force, 1962)
- Adventures in Standards (Creative World, 1975)
- The Uncollected 1962 Vol. 6 (Hindsight, 1983)
- Mellophonium Magic (Status, 1989)
- Mellophonium Moods 1962 (Status, 1990)
- More Mellophonium Moods (Status, 1995)
- At Holiday Ballroom Northbrook, Chicago, Illinois 1962 (Status, 1996)

With Chaka Khan

- Naughty (Warner Bros., 1980)
- Chaka Khan (Warner Bros., 1982)
- Destiny (Warner Bros., 1986)

With Al Kooper

- You Never Know Who Your Friends Are (Columbia, 1969)
- The Landlord (United Artists, 1971)
- Act Like Nothing's Wrong (United Artists, 1976)

With Hubert Laws

- Crying Song (CTI, 1969)
- Morning Star (CTI, 1972)
- Romeo & Juliet (Columbia, 1976)
- Say It with Silence (Columbia, 1978)

With Enoch Light

- Enoch Light and the Brass Menagerie (Project 3, 1969)
- Big Band Hits of the 30s & 40s (Project 3, 1971)
- The Big Band Sound of the Thirties (Project 3, 1971)
- The Brass Menagerie 1973 (Project 3, 1972)
- The Big Band Hits of the 40s & 50s (Project 3, 1973)
- Movie Hits! (Project 3, 1972)
- The Disco Disque (Project 3, 1975)
- Big Hits of the Seventies Vol. 2 (Project 3, 1975)
- Dancing in the Dark/Disco Greats (Project 3, 1977)

With Gary McFarland

- Does the Sun Really Shine On the Moon? (Skye, 1968)
- America the Beautiful (Skye, 1969)
- Butterscotch Rum (Buddah, 1971)

With Bob Mintzer

- Papa Lips (CBS/Sony, 1983)
- Incredible Journey (DMP, 1985)
- Camouflage (DMP, 1986)
- Spectrum (DMP, 1988)
- Urban Contours (DMP, 1989)
- Art of the Big Band (DMP, 1991)
- Departure (DMP, 1993)
- Only in New York (DMP, 1994)
- Big Band Trane (DMP, 1996)
- Live at the Berlin Jazz Festival (Basic, 1996)

With Cal Tjader

- Hip Vibrations (Verve, 1967)
- The Prophet (Verve, 1968)
- Cal Tjader Sounds Out Burt Bacharach (Skye, 1968)

With Stanley Turrentine

- New Time Shuffle (Blue Note, 1979)
- Stanley Turrentine, Return of the Prodigal Son (Blue Note, 2008)
- Stanley Turrentine, Inflation (Elektra, 2014)

With Sadao Watanabe

- Nice Shot! (Flying Disk, 1980)
- Orange Express (CBS/Sony, 1981)
- Morning Island (JVC, 1991)

With Patrick Williams

- Shades of Today (Verve, 1968)
- Think (Verve, 1968)
- Heavy Vibrations (Verve, 1969)
- Threshold (Capitol, 1973)
- Come On and Shine (MPS, 1978)
- 10th Avenue (Soundwings, 1987)

With others

- Peter Allen, Continental American (A&M, 1977)
- Louis Armstrong, Louis Armstrong and His Friends (Flying Dutchman, 1970)
- Patti Austin, Havana Candy (CTI, 1977)
- B. B. & Q. Band, All Night Long (Capitol, 1982)
- Burt Bacharach, Futures (A&M, 1977)
- Richard Barbary, Soul Machine (A&M/CTI, 1968)
- Gato Barbieri, Caliente! (A&M, 1976)
- Gato Barbieri, Ruby, Ruby (A&M, 1977)
- George Benson, Shape of Things to Come (A&M/CTI, 1968)
- George Benson, The Other Side of Abbey Road (A&M, 1970)
- Blood, Sweat & Tears, More Than Ever (Columbia, 1976)
- Angela Bofill, Angie (Arista GRP, 1978)
- Eddie Brigati, Lost in the Wilderness (Elektra, 1976)
- James Brown, Reality (Polydor, 1974)
- Ray Bryant, In the Cut (Cadet, 1974)
- Kenny Burrell, Night Song (Verve, 1969)
- Charlie Calello, Calello Serenade (Midsong, 1979)
- Charlie Calello, Sing, Sing, Sing/In the Mood (EMI, 1979)
- Barbara Carroll, From the Beginning (United Artists, 1977)
- Benny Carter, Central City Sketches (MusicMasters, 1987)
- Felix Cavaliere, Castles in the Air (Epic, 1979)
- Billy Cobham, Simplicity of Expression, Depth of Thought (Columbia, 1978)
- Hank Crawford, Wildflower (Kudu, 1973)
- King Curtis, Everybody's Talkin' (ATCO, 1972)
- Miles Davis & Quincy Jones, Live at Montreux (Warner Bros., 1993)
- Les DeMerle, Spectrum (United Artists, 1969)
- John Denver, Take Me to Tomorrow (RCA Victor, 1970)
- Dena DeRose, The Nearness of Two (GoFour, 2007)
- Paul Desmond, Summertime (A&M, 1969)
- Paul Desmond, From the Hot Afternoon (A&M/CTI, 1969)
- Bo Diddley, Big Bad Bo (Chess, 1974)
- Bob Dorough, A Taste of Honey (Music Minus One, 1972)
- Larry Elgart, Flight of the Condor (RCA Victor, 1981)
- Bill Evans, Symbiosis (MPS/BASF, 1974)
- Donald Fagen, Morph the Cat (Reprise, 2006)
- Faith, Hope & Charity, Faith, Hope & Charity (RCA Victor, 1975)
- Maynard Ferguson, Primal Scream (Columbia, 1976)
- Maynard Ferguson, Conquistador (Columbia, 1977)
- Frank Foster, Manhattan Fever (Blue Note, 1968)
- Michael Franks, Dragonfly Summer
- Friends of Distinction, Reviviscence Live to Light Again (RCA Victor, 1975)
- Eric Gale, Forecast (Kudu, 1973)
- Eric Gale, Multiplication (Columbia, 1977)
- Erroll Garner, Up in Erroll's Room (MPS, 1968)
- Erroll Garner, Now Playing (Telarc, 1996)
- Gloria Gaynor, Glorious (Polydor, 1977)
- Mike Gibbs & Gary Burton, In the Public Interest (Polydor, 1974)
- Astrud Gilberto, Beach Samba (Verve, 1967)
- Lotti Golden, Lotti Golden (GRT, 1971)
- Grant Green, Blue Breakbeats (Blue Note, 1998)
- Grant Green, The Final Comedown (Blue Note, 2003)
- Urbie Green, Urbie Green's Big Beautiful Band (Project 3, 1974)
- Hall & Oates, Abandoned Luncheonette (Atlantic, 1973)
- Donny Hathaway, Extension of a Man (ATCO, 1973)
- Johnny Hammond, The Prophet (Kudu, 1972)
- Johnny Hammond, Higher Ground (Kudu, 1974)
- Woody Herman, The Jazz Swinger (Columbia, 1966)
- Terumasa Hino, City Connection (Flying Disk, 1979)
- Terumasa Hino, Daydream (Flying Disk, 1980)
- Johnny Hodges, 3 Shades of Blue (Flying Dutchman, 1970)
- Jay Hoggard, Days Like These (Arista GRP, 1979)
- Jennifer Holliday, Say You Love Me
- Groove Holmes, New Groove (Groove Merchant, 1974)
- Rupert Holmes, Rupert Holmes (Epic, 1975)
- Rupert Holmes, Pursuit of Happiness (Private Stock, 1978)
- Mike Holober, Balancing Act (Palmetto, 2015)
- Lena Horne & Michel Legrand, Lena & Michel (RCA Victor, 1975)
- Janis Ian, Who Really Cares (Verve Forecast, 1969)
- Jackie and Roy, Time & Love (CTI, 1972)
- Jazz Orchestra of the Delta, Big Band Reflections of Cole Porter (2003)
- Garland Jeffreys, One-Eyed Jack (A&M, 1978)
- Antonio Carlos Jobim, Antonio Carlos Jobim's Finest Hour (Verve, 2000)
- Antonio Carlos Jobim, Tide (Verve, 2000)
- Billy Joel, The Bridge (Columbia, 1986)
- J.J Johnson & Kai Winding, Betwixt & Between (A&M/CTI, 1969)
- Kleeer, I Love to Dance (Atlantic, 1979)
- Michel Legrand, Twenty Songs of the Century (Bell, 1974)
- O'Donel Levy, Dawn of a New Day(Groove Merchant, 1973)
- Jackie Lomax, Three (Warner Bros., 1972)
- Jon Lucien, Mind's Eye (RCA, 1974)
- Jon Lucien, Rashida (RCA, 1995)
- The Main Ingredient, Bitter Sweet (RCA Victor, 1972)
- Chuck Mangione, Friends & Love (Mercury, 1970)
- Gap Mangione, Diana in the Autumn Wind (GRC, 1968)
- The Manhattan Transfer, The Manhattan Transfer (Atlantic, 1975)
- The Manhattan Transfer, Pastiche (Atlantic, 1978)
- Frank Mantooth, Sophisticated Lady (Sea Breeze, 1995)
- Arif Mardin, Journey (Atlantic, 1974)
- Charlie Mariano, A Jazz Portrait of Charlie Mariano (Regina, 1963)
- Paul Mauriat, Overseas Call (Philips, 1978)
- Percy Mayfield, Blues and Then Some (RCA Victor, 1971)
- Bill Mays, Mays in Manhattan (Concord Jazz, 1996)
- Bill Mays, Fantasy (Palmetto, 2007)
- Paul McCartney & Linda McCartney, Ram (Apple, 1971)
- Van McCoy, The Disco Kid (Avco, 1975)
- Jackie McLean, Monuments (RCA, 1979)
- Jimmy McGriff, Tailgunner (LRC, 1977)
- Vince Mendoza, Instructions Inside (Manhattan, 1991)
- Vince Mendoza, Vince Mendoza 2 (Steps 1994)
- Glenn Miller, In the Digital Mood (GRP, 1983)
- Eddy Mitchell, Made in USA (Barclay, 1975)
- Marisa Monte, Green, Blue, Yellow, Rose and Charcoal (Metro Blue/EMI, 1994)
- Wes Montgomery, Road Song (A&M/CTI, 1968)
- Tony Mottola, Tony Mottola and the Brass Menagerie (Project 3, 1974)
- Gerry Mulligan, Little Big Horn (GRP, 1983)
- Milton Nascimento, Courage (A&M/CTI, 1969)
- Oliver Nelson, The Spirit of '67 (Impulse!, 1967)
- New York Voices, Sing! Sing! Sing! (Concord Jazz, 2001)
- Goro Noguchi, Goro in New York (Polydor, 1977)
- Chico O'Farrill, Latin Roots (Philips, 1976)
- Babatunde Olatunji, Soul Makossa (Paramount, 1973)
- Tony Orlando & Dawn, To Be with You (Elektra, 1976)
- Duke Pearson, Introducing Duke Pearson's Big Band (Blue Note, 1968)
- Duke Pearson, Now Hear This (Blue Note, 1969)
- Esther Phillips, Black-Eyed Blues (Kudu, 1973)
- Esther Phillips, Performance (Kudu, 1974)
- Players Association, Turn the Music Up! (Vanguard, 1979)
- Jimmy Ponder, While My Guitar Gently Weeps (Cadet, 1974)
- Jimmy Ponder, All Things Beautiful (LRC, 1978)
- Jim Pugh, Crystal Eyes (Pewter, 1984)
- Johnny Richards, Aqui Se Habla Espanol (Roulette, 1967)
- David Ruffin, Who I Am (Motown, 1975)
- David Ruffin, In My Stride (Motown, 1977)
- Stuart Scharf, The Disguises Album (Laissez-Faire, 1975)
- Don Sebesky, The Distant Galaxy (Verve, 1968)
- Carly Simon, My Romance (Arista, 1990)
- Carly Simon, Have You Seen Me Lately? (Arista, 1990)
- Lucy Simon, Lucy Simon (RCA Victor, 1975)
- Lonnie Smith, Funk Reaction (LRC, 1977)
- Dakota Staton, I Want a Country Man (Groove Merchant, 1973)
- Ed Summerlin, Liturgical Jazz (Ecclesia, 1959)
- Ed Summerlin, Ring Out Joy (Avant Garde, 1968)
- Gabor Szabo, Mizrab (CTI, 1973)
- Grady Tate, Windmills of My Mind (Skye, 1968)
- Leon Thomas, Facets (Flying Dutchman, 1973)
- Libby Titus, Libby Titus (Columbia, 1977)
- Arto Tuncboyaciyan, Every Day Is a New Life (Living Music, 2000)
- Frankie Valli, Our Day Will Come (Private Stock, 1975)
- Frankie Valli, Lady Put the Light Out (Private Stock, 1977)
- Loudon Wainwright III, T Shirt (Arista, 1976)
- T-Bone Walker, Very Rare (Reprise, 1973)
- Walter Wanderley, Moondreams (A&M/CTI, 1969)
- Walter Wanderley, When It Was Done (A&M/CTI, 1969)
- Grover Washington Jr., All the King's Horses (Kudu, 1972)
- Grover Washington Jr., Mister Magic (Kudu, 1975)
- Fred Wesley, It Don't Mean a Thing If It Ain't Got That Swing (Sons of Sound, 2006)
- Westchester Jazz Orchestra, All In (WJO, 2007)
- Westchester Jazz Orchestra, Maiden Voyage Suite (WJO, 2011)
- Randy Weston, Blue Moses (CTI, 1972)
- Larry Willis, A New Kind of Soul (LLP, 1970)
- Zulema, R.S.V.P. (RCA Victor, 1975)
- Boyce and Hart, "I Wonder What Shes Doing Tonight" (1968)
