= Mellophone =

Brass instrument

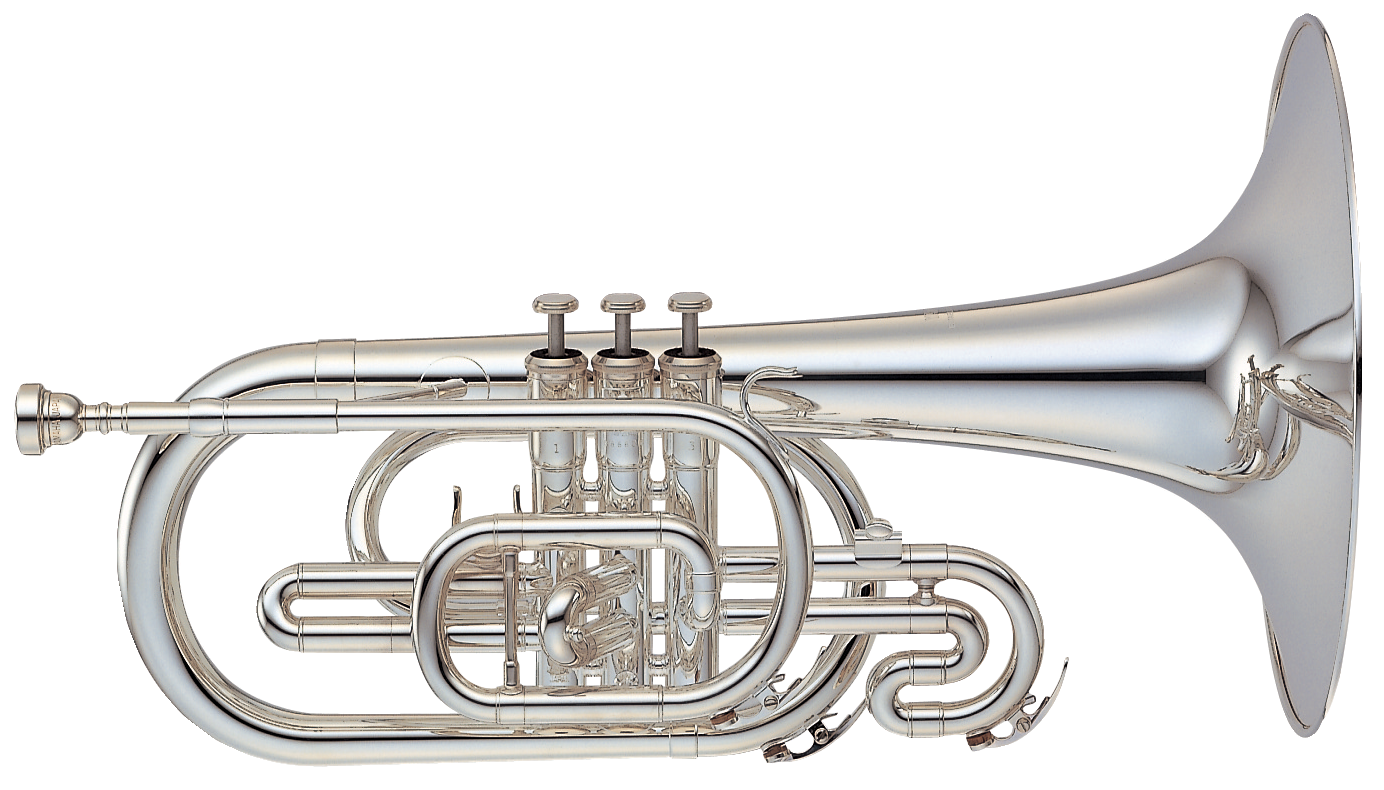

Brass instrument
- Other names: en: Mellophonium, tenor cor, fr: cor alto, de: Altkorno, Alt-Corno, it: genis corno
- Classification: Wind; Brass; Aerophone

Playing range
- in F: sounds one fifth lower than written

Related instruments
- French horn; Trumpet; Cornet; Flugelhorn; Alto horn; Euphonium

The mellophone is a brass instrument used in some marching bands in place of French horns. It is a middle-voiced instrument, typically pitched in the key of F, though models in E♭, D, C, and G (as a bugle) have also historically existed. It has a conical bore and piston valves, like those of the euphonium and flugelhorn.

These instruments are used instead of French horns for marching because their bells face forward instead of to the back (or to the side), as dissipation of the sound becomes a concern in the open-air environment of marching. Tuning is done by adjustment of the tuning slide or the first valve slide. Fingerings for the mellophone are the same as fingerings for the trumpet, tenor horn, and most valved brass instruments. Owing to its use primarily outside concert music, there is little solo literature for the mellophone, other than that used within drum and bugle corps, and a single concerto written for the instrument.

== Characteristics ==
The present-day mellophone has three valves, operated with the right hand (1- and 2- valve mellophone bugles have been used in the past). Mellophone fingerings are the same as the trumpet. It is typically pitched lower, in the key of F or E♭. The overtone series of the F mellophone is an octave above that of the F horn. The tubing length of a mellophone is the same as that of the F-alto (high) single horn or the F-alto (high) branch of a triple horn or double-descant horn.

The direction of the bell as well as the much-reduced amount of tubing (compared to a French horn) make the mellophone look like a large trumpet. The mouthpiece of a mellophone at first glance appears to be a trumpet mouthpiece with a very short shank. However, the cup of the mouthpiece is deep, like that of the flugelhorn, and has a wider inner diameter than a trumpet mouthpiece. These mouthpieces give the mellophone a dark, round sound. Some trumpet players who double on mellophone use a trumpet-style parabolic ("cup") mouthpiece on the instrument, resulting in a much brighter, more trumpet-like sound. Horn players doubling on mellophone often use a smaller, lighter, conical ("funnel") mouthpiece, as used on French horns, with an adapter to allow them to fit in the larger-bore leadpipe of the mellophone. This style mouthpiece gives the instrument a warmer sound than using a trumpet mouthpiece, and allows French horn players to play the mellophone without changing their embouchure between the two instruments.

== History ==
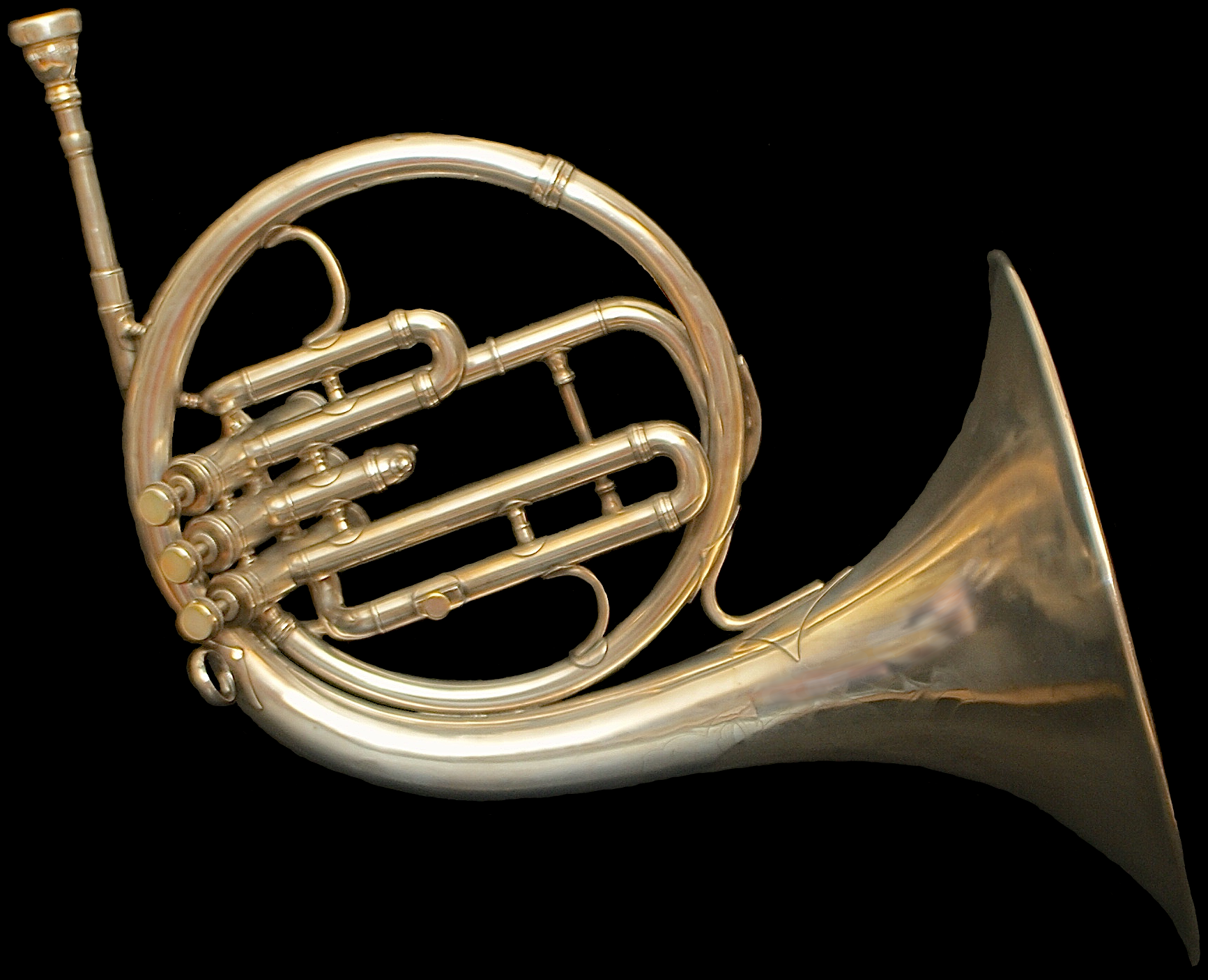
1911 Conn Concert Mellophone

Two instruments carry the name mellophone:

1. Traditional "Concert", "Classic", or "Circular" mellophones with a rear or sideways facing bell similar to the french horn.
2. The marching mellophone, with a forward-facing bell.

In general, the mellophone has its origin in the horn design boom of the 19th century. The earliest version was the Koenig horn, based on a design by Herman Koenig, but manufactured by Antoine Courtois, who may also have played a significant role in its design. Courtois had just won the right to manufacture the saxhorn, in a lawsuit against the inventor of the saxophone, Adolphe Sax. The Koenig horn had three piston valves — the kind used on a modern trumpet, which were a relatively new technology at that time — and was otherwise shaped somewhat like a modern French horn, but smaller. This shape was largely influenced by the post horn.

Köhler & Son originally began using the name "mellophone" for its line of horns based loosely on similar instruments by Distin. These were also post horn-like instruments with valves, but the mouthpieces and bell angle were slowly evolving to allow for more projection and control of sound with the technology of valves.

The traditional instrument is visually modeled on the horn, with a round shape and a rear-facing bell and has come to be known as a "classic", "concert", or "circular" mellophone. Unlike French horns, it is played with the right hand, and the bell points to the rear left of the player and is generally keyed in F with facility to switch to E♭. Older instruments often included the capability of playing in the key of D and/or C as well. It was used as an alto voice both outdoors and indoors by community and school bands in place of the French horn. The manufacture of these instruments declined significantly in the mid-twentieth century, and they are rarely in use today. In some instances these are called a Tenor Cor.

Mellophone bugles keyed in G were manufactured for American drum and bugle corps from approximately the 1950s. Drum Corps International rules first allowed brass instruments in any key for the 2000 season, though most corps kept their G bugles that year.

Modern marching mellophones are more directly related to bugle-horns such as the flugelhorn, euphonium, and tuba. Their tube profile is likewise more conical than the trumpet or trombone.

== Difference from the horn ==
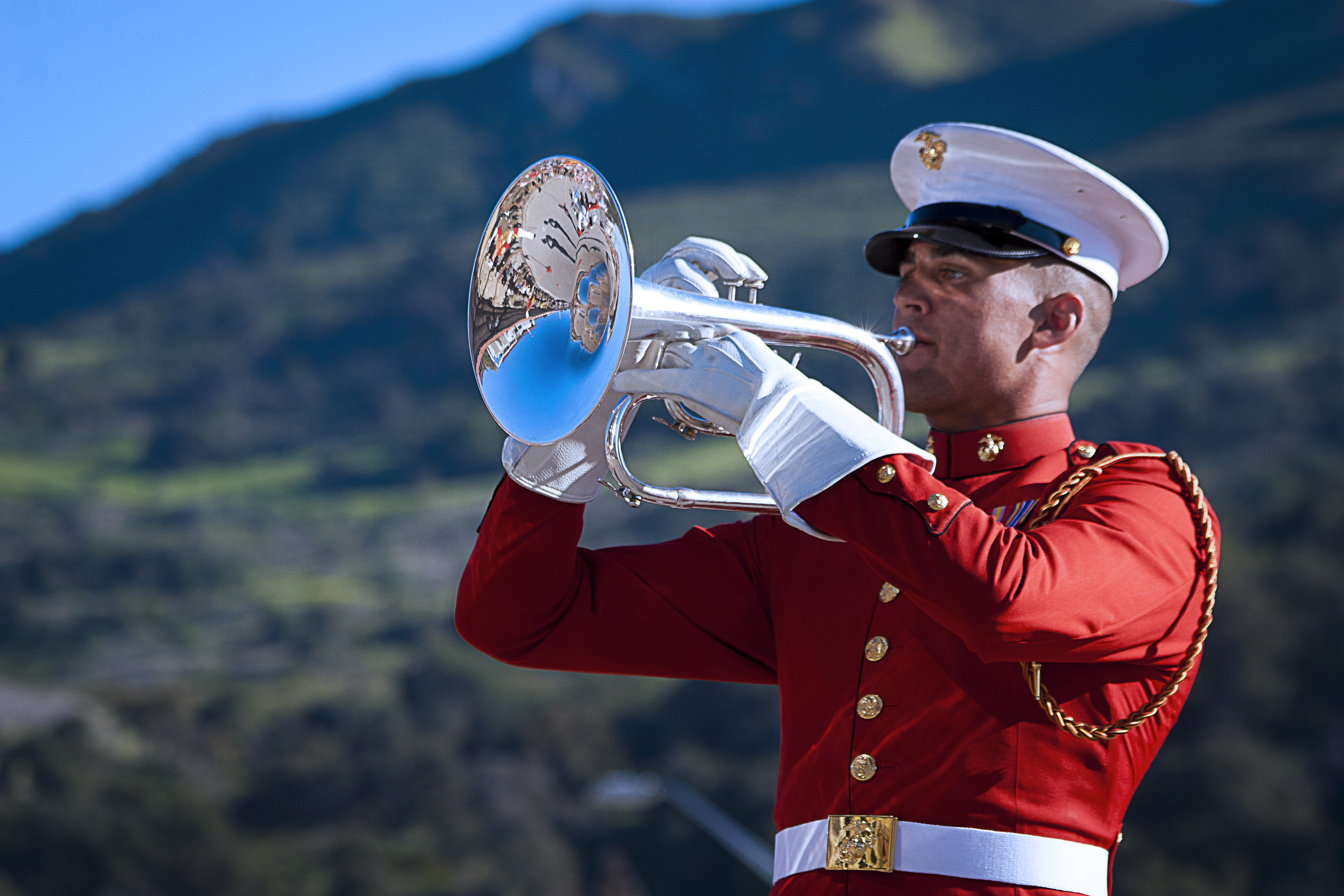
A U.S. Marine Drum & Bugle Corps mellophone bugle player

The marching mellophone is used in place of the horn for marching because it is a bell-front instrument allowing projection of the sound in the direction that the player is facing. This is especially important in drum corps and marching bands because the audience is typically on only one side of the ensemble. Mellophones are usually constructed with a smaller bore for louder volume than marching French horns. There are also marching B♭ French horns with a bell-front configuration; these do use a horn mouthpiece and have a more French horn-like sound, but are more difficult to play accurately on the field.

Another factor in the greater use of mellophones is its ease of use as compared to the difficulty of playing a French horn consistently well. In a French horn, the length of tubing (and the bore size) make the partials much closer together than other brass instruments in their normal range and, therefore, harder to play accurately. The F mellophone has tubing half the length of a French horn, which gives it an overtone series more similar to a trumpet and most other brass instruments.

The mellophone is an instrument designed specifically to bring the approximate sound of a horn in a package which is conducive to playing while marching. Outside a marching setting, the traditional French horn is ubiquitous and the mellophone is rarely used.

== Mellophonium ==
=== Stan Kenton's instrument ===
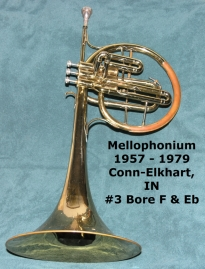
The type of Mellophonium used by Stan Kenton's orchestra, which variously used mellophone mouthpieces and a specially designed horn-trumpet hybrid mouthpiece for Stan Kenton's band.

C.G. Conn developed its 16E "Mellophonium" and first marketed it in 1957. It is essentially a Conn 14E "classic" or "concert" mellophone that has figuratively been partially unwrapped to form a bell forward instrument. American bandleader Stan Kenton himself was not involved in the design of the mellophonium; in 1961, however, he provided an endorsement for Conn's advertising upon adopting the instrument. Kenton had, for several years, wished to add another brass voice alongside the trumpets and trombones in his orchestra and experimented unsuccessfully with additional instruments, before discovering the Conn Mellophonium, which bridged the gap he was seeking to fill:

In 1962, Kenton explained:

For some time, I recognized the need for using an instrument that would not only give the orchestra another solo voice, but would add more warmth and emphasis to the thematic line. The Mellophonium has not only met all the preliminary requirements, but has also suggested intriguing new ways to shade and dramatize sound. My decision to use four Mellophoniums didn't just happen overnight. Nor are they gimmick instruments. Both the arranging staff and myself realized the need for an instrument that would capture the width of sound that virtually lay untouched between the trumpets and trombones. We first tried ten trumpets—five B flat and five E flat. They didn't make it because it was impossible to distinguish any difference between the two instruments....After experimenting for two days with the flugelhorn, we were ready to give it up completely! Finally, the Conn Instrument Corporation learned that we were interested in locating a new brass instrument and asked us to try the mellophonium. After much experimentation and many preliminary rehearsals, the Mellophonium became the answer we had been looking for.

The instrument could be played by a trumpeter with relative ease, though most Mellophonium players in Kenton's band were reluctant users of the instrument due to its difficulty to play in-tune particularly in the higher registers. Several trumpeters quit in protest rather than switch full-time to Mellophonium, and only a few band members preferred the new instrument. Kenton used a four-man mellophonium section September 1960 through November 1963 on 11 albums; two of those LPs received Grammy Awards (Kenton's West Side Story and Adventures In Jazz).

=== Bach instrument ===
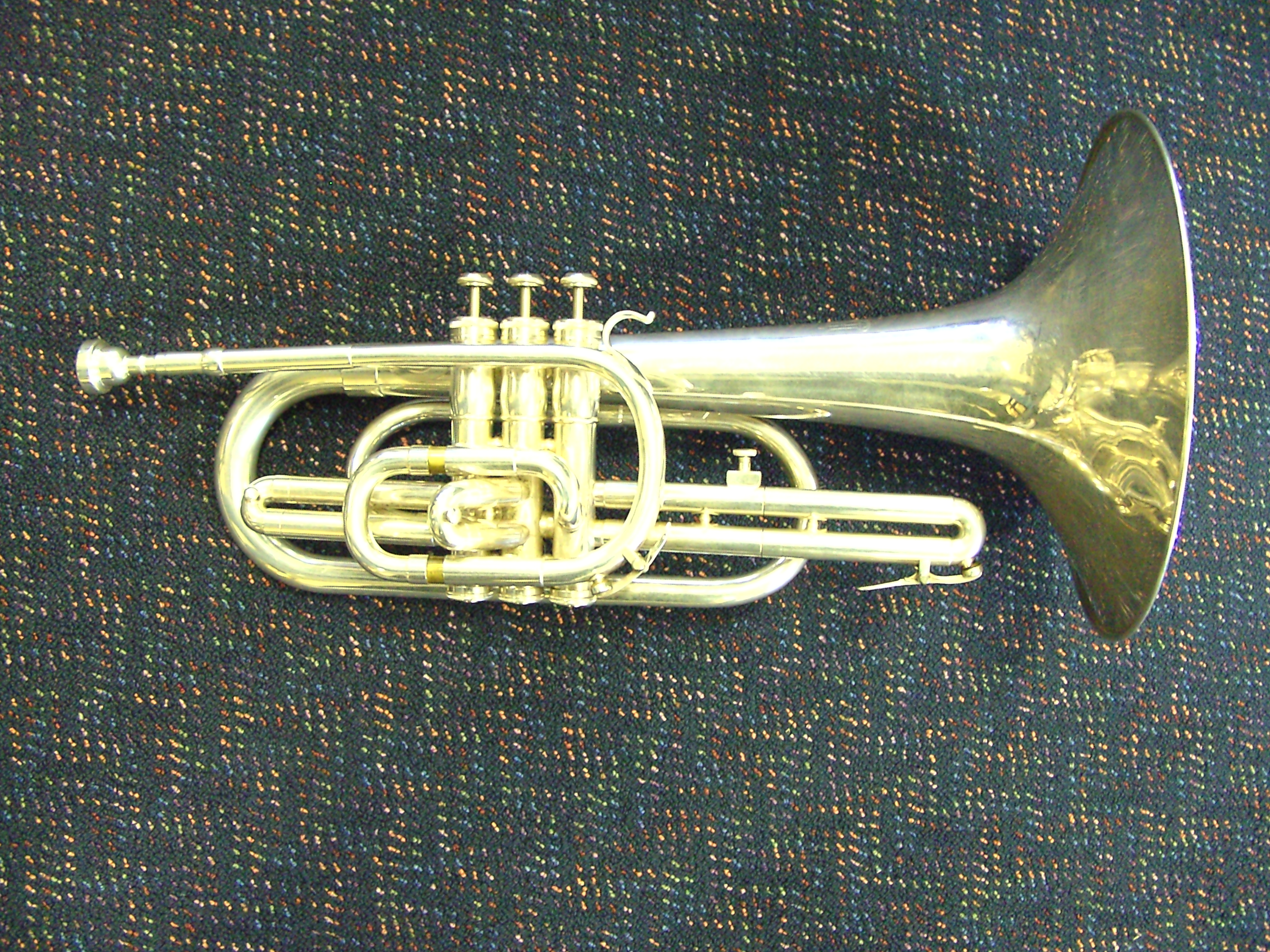
A Vincent Bach Mercedes F Marching Mellophone

The Vincent Bach Corporation also produced a mellophonium, with the shape of the tubing more reminiscent of the cornet.

=== F. E. Olds instrument ===
The F. E. Olds company manufactured mellophoniums with the same wrap as the Vincent Bach Corporation design.

=== Holton instrument ===
The Holton company manufactured mellophoniums with a trumpet like lead pipe and valve assembly with the rest being comparable to a mellophonium.
