= Harry Gozzard =

Canadian-American jazz trumpeter

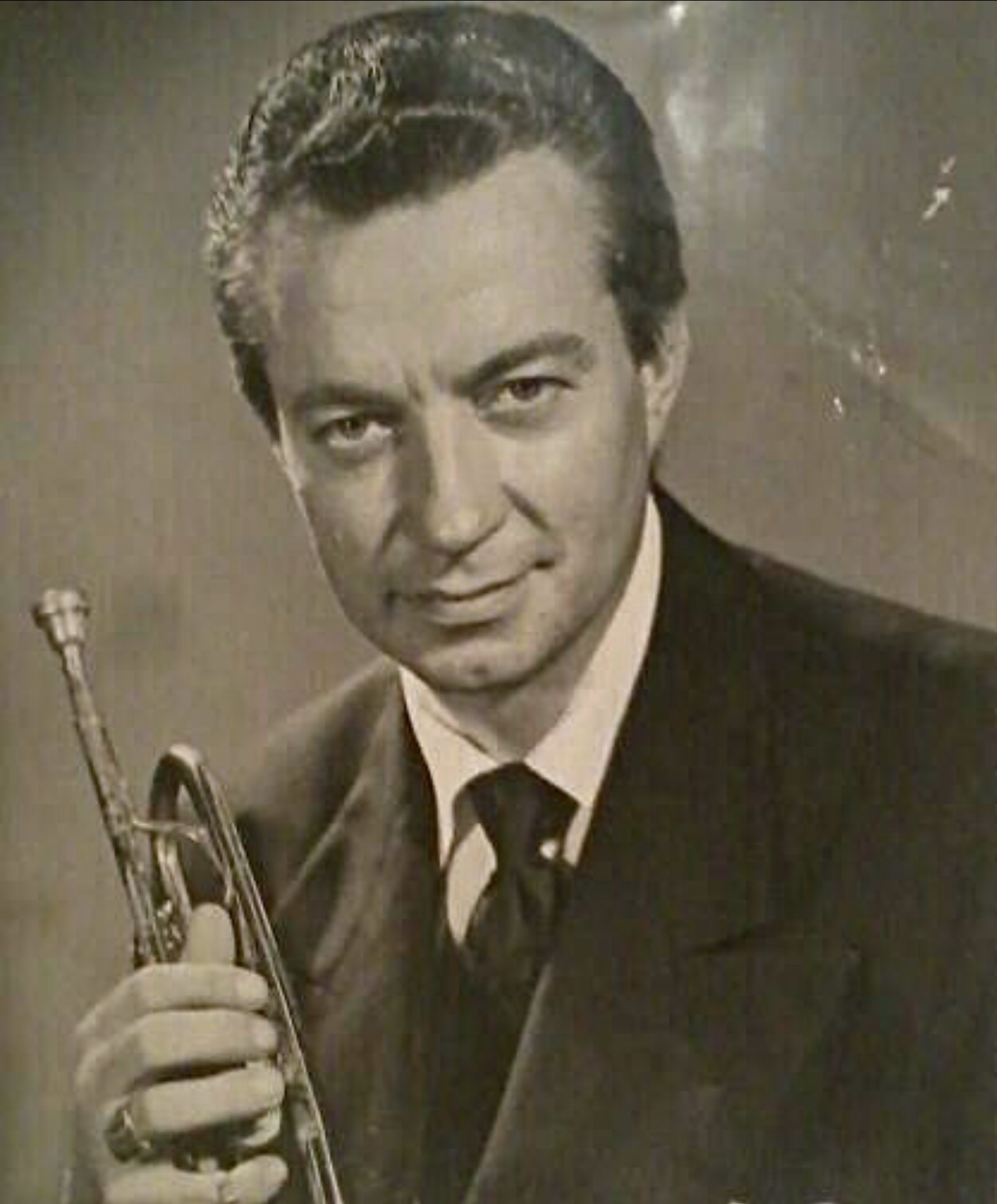

Background information
- Born: Harry Roy Gozzard; March 5, 1916; Shelburne, Ontario, Canada
- Died: January 11, 1995 (aged 78) Warren, Michigan, U.S.
- Genres: Swing; big band; mainstream jazz; blues
- Occupation: Musician
- Instrument: Trumpet
- Years active: 1934–1980
- Labels: RCA Victor, Bluebird Records, Capitol Records, Okeh Records, Vocalion Records, Regal Zonophone Records

Harry Roy Gozzard (March 5, 1916 – January 11, 1995) was a Canadian-American jazz trumpeter. He first performed with Sam Donahue. (In an article written by Mike Zirpolo, for Swing and Beyond, Donahue was described as "a superlative tenor saxophone soloist.") Other members of Donahue's band included the former The Tonight Show Starring Johnny Carson bandleader Doc Severinsen, 1946 Esquire Award winner for Best New Female Vocalist Frances Wayne, Grammy Award-winning vocalist and actress Jo Stafford and popular music arranger Leo Reisman.

While he was with the Donahue band, Gozzard performed a few times with legendary piano-playing bandleader Count Basie. Basie was featured on four Donahue Okeh recordings made in New York on December 26, 1940. In Count Basie: A Bio-Discography, Chris Sheridan stated, "on Boxing Day, Basie flew to New York to guest on a Sam Donahue date."

In William F. Lee's book, American Big Bands, he mentioned that Gozzard was a sideman in the Sonny Burke Orchestra in the early 1940s. They performed at the famous Roseland Ballroom in New York. (Lady Gaga was the last one to perform there before it closed its doors in 2014. The online newspaper Curbed mentioned in an article that the site was redeveloped into a 62-story, luxury apartment building.) At the time, Burke's band recorded for Decca, Okeh and Vocalion. Gozzard was a part of at least 16 recordings with Burke's band. (In 1938, Donahue went to work with Gene Krupa. Instead of disbanding his orchestra, Donahue turned over the leadership position to Sonny Burke. Around that time, John Hammond, encouraged Burke to bring the band to New York. George T. Simon stated in his book, The Big Bands, that Burke "brought his young Detroiters to New York, rehearsed them, helped support them and eventually landed an engagement at the Roseland in Brooklyn plus an Okeh recording contract." Hammond was instrumental in igniting several musical careers, including those of Count Basie, Bob Dylan, Harry James, Bruce Springsteen, Benny Goodman, Aretha Franklin and others.)

== Early life ==
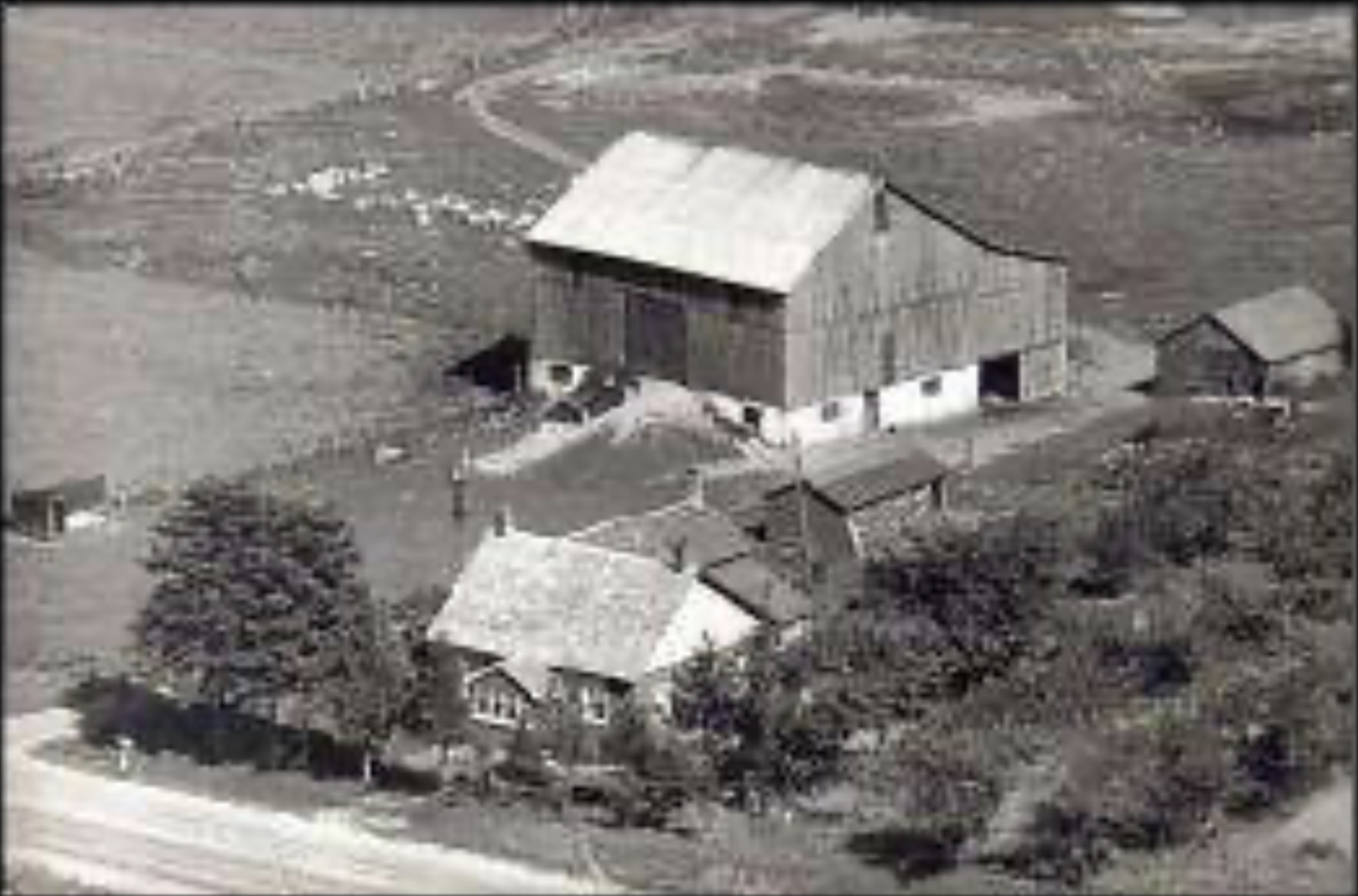
Farm In Shelburne, Ontario where Gozzard lived from birth to 1924

The youngest of Charlotte (née Campbell) and William Gozzard's four children, Harry Gozzard was born in Shelburne, Ontario, Canada, on March 5, 1916. His three older siblings, Margaret "Bessie" Gozzard Pulis (May 6, 1912 – May 24, 1998), William Leonard Gozzard and Kathleen Mary Gozzard Costigan, were also born in Shelburne. Gozzard's ancestors originated in England, Scotland and Ireland. His grandmother migrated to Canada from Ireland during the Great Famine of the 1840s. He, his parents and the other siblings migrated to Detroit, Michigan in 1924.

In 1949, Gozzard met a Kentucky-born woman named Wilda Crager. They married in 1952. Their eldest child, Michael (April 11, 1948 – April 18, 2017), taught at Hesser College and was also a high school guidance counselor at a New England high school.

== Career ==
=== 1930s – 40s: Sam Donahue, Sonny Burke and Jan Savitt ===
Sam Donahue formed his first band in the mid-thirties. At the time, he was just 15 years old. He led that band for five years. Gozzard, who was very young himself at the time, was a part of that Detroit band. It is unclear, however, if he was an original member.

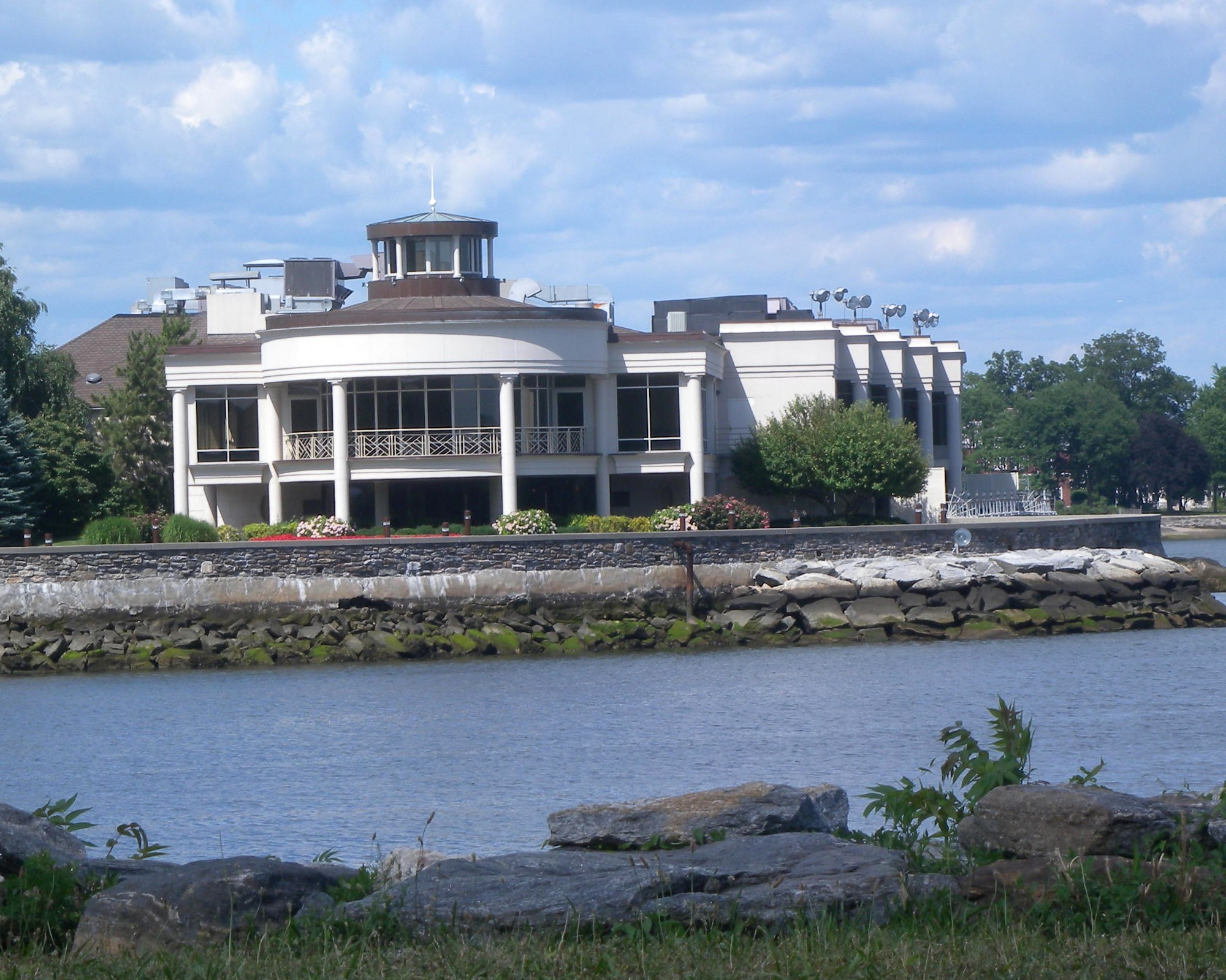
Gozzard, while in the Donahue band, played at Glen Island Casino in the 40s.

Donahue turned over the leadership position to Sonny Burke in 1938 when he went to work for Gene Krupa. After two years working with Krupa, Donahue then went to work for both Harry James and Benny Goodman in 1940.

At some point in 1940, Donahue resumed as bandleader of his original band. They "played key eastern locations, including the Glen Island Casino and Frank Dailey's Meadowbrook [Ballroom]." Many artists made their names at Glen Island. The Glenn Miller Orchestra was given its big break when they were chosen to play the 1939 summer season at that prestigious venue.

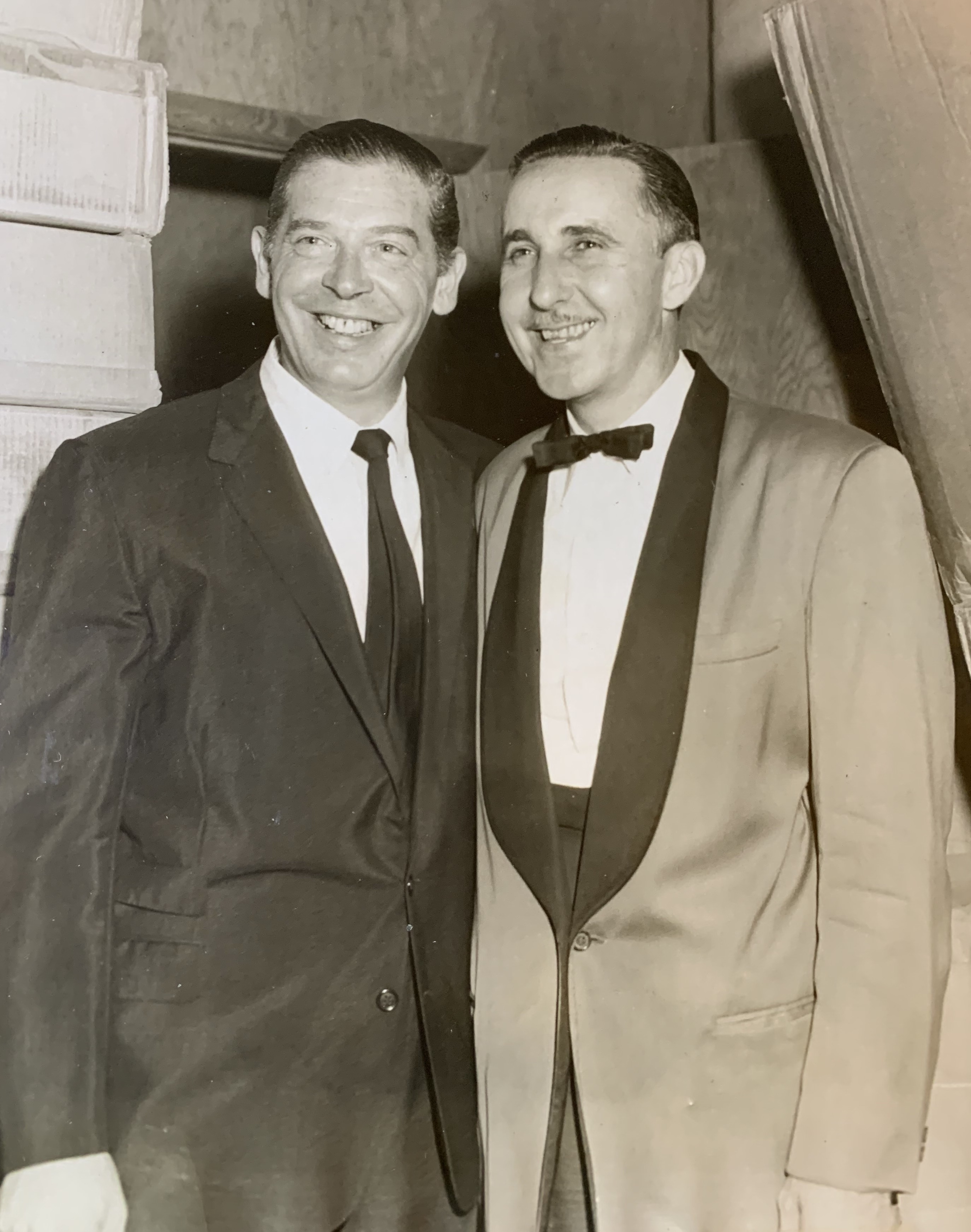
Milton Berle and the Elmwood Casino bandleader Jack Madden. Gozzard worked with both of them at the Elmwood. Berle and Glenn Miller were in the film Sun Valley Serenade.

As depicted in the movie The Glenn Miller Story, Si (Simon) Shribman, "a Boston-based operator who...owned a string of ballrooms all over New England," offered Miller the opportunity to perform at his State Ballroom. In an August 1942 issue, Billboard stated that "Shribman currently has Sam Donahue" booked "at Glen Island Casino." (In an article about Sam Donahue's Navy band, Jazz journalist, Lynn René Bayley, posted a photograph of him and Glenn Miller shaking hands while both were in the service during World War II.) Jack Madden was the last bandleader that Gozzard worked for. Madden "replaced Glenn Miller in the Ray Noble band in 1938 when it toured the British Isles." Miller left Noble's band to start his own.

“Donahue's band…it’s very definitely on the right track. Given the encouragement and publicity that go band in band [sic] with engagements like Glen Island Casino, it's quite likely to blossom forth as one of the country's most formidable and popular dance bands.”

— George T. Simon in Metronome

Donahue and his orchestra performed at other popular venues across the U.S. An article in Billboard stated that they played a six-week engagement at the Casa Manana night club in Culver City, California, in the latter part of 1942, followed by another six-week engagement at the Hollywood Casino in Hollywood, California. Prior to that West Coast tour, they performed at Coral Gables in East Lansing, Michigan, Roseland-State Ballroom in Boston, Blue Gardens in Armonk, New York and Beach Point Club in Mamaroneck, New York. Blue Gardens (and perhaps the other venues, too) was broadcast live on the radio.

The Complete History of the Big Bands stated that Donahue’s band “was one of the best bands in the country. Its brief success was interrupted by Donahue’s enlistment in the U.S. Navy after Pearl Harbor.”

Donahue was represented by William Morris Agency, a Hollywood-based talent agency that represented some of the best-known 20th-century entertainers in film, television, and music. It is unclear if the representation covered the band members, too.

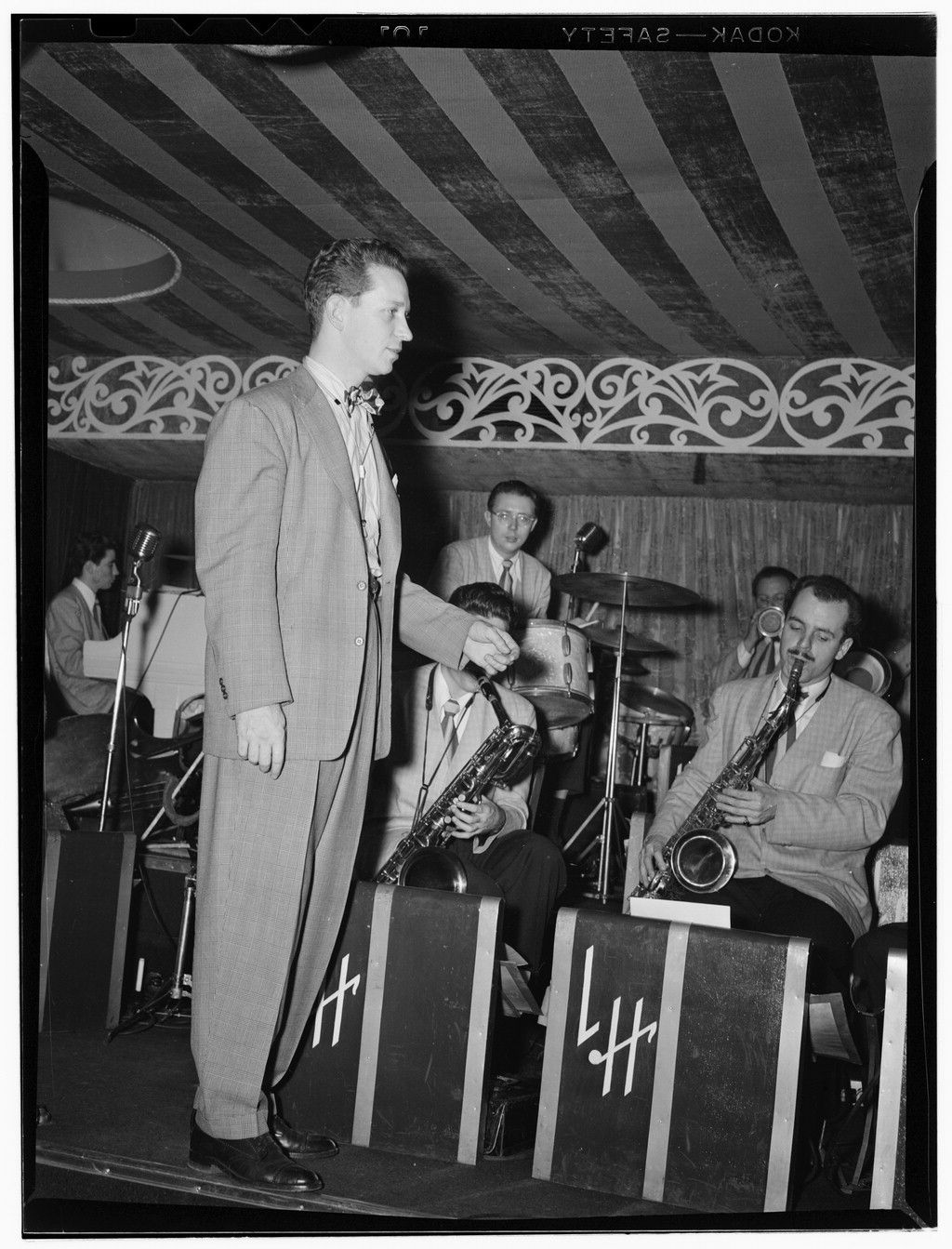
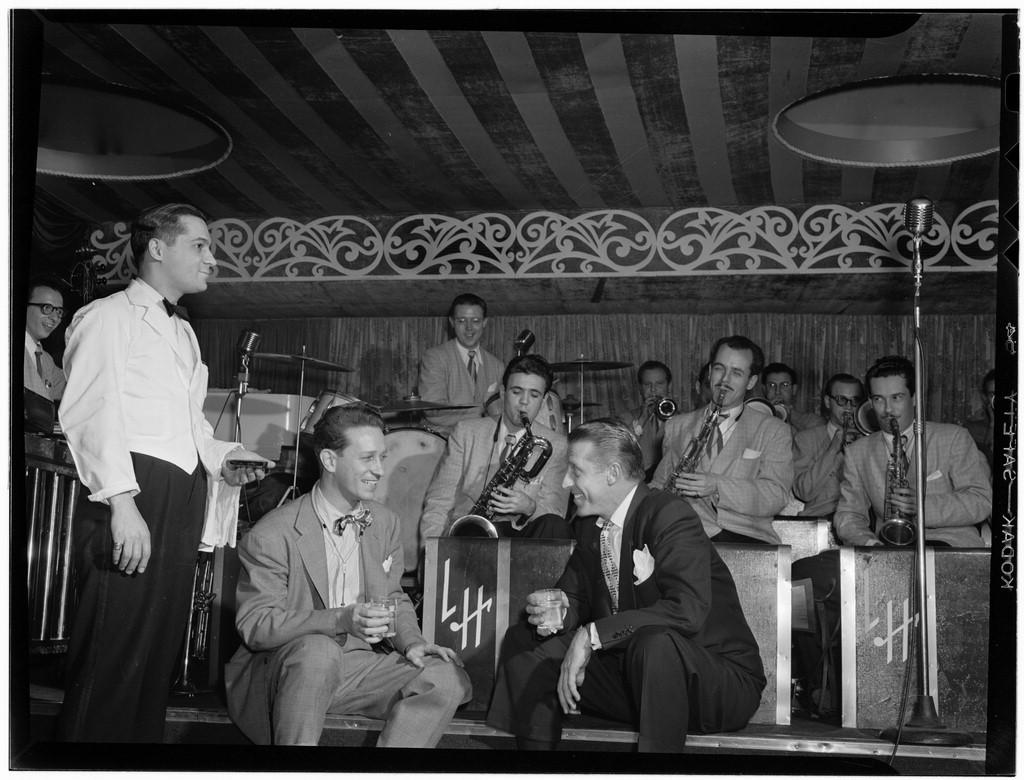
Sam Donahue Orchestra at the Aquarium in NYC, 1946. Gozzard was a sideman in his band (left). Donahue, sitting with Stan Kenton, is on the Grammy Award-winning album, Kenton's West Side Story (right).

During his years in Donahue's band, Gozzard took part in a recording known as Beat the Band to the Bar. It is a collection of songs recorded between 1930–1954. Allmusic described it as a "sampler of irreverent hot novelties, jazz burlesques, and big-band sendups." Many prominent jazz musicians performed on that album...Sam Donahue, Tommy Dorsey, Glenn Miller, Guy Lombardo, Woody Herman, Count Basie, Artie Shaw, Rudy Vallée, Hoagy Carmichael, Charlie Barnet, Ozzie Nelson and many more.

At the young age of 25, Gozzard (in Donahue's band) performed in a series of recordings for Bluebird Records. Founded in 1932 by Eli Oberstein, Bluebird was a RCA Victor subsidiary label best known for their low-cost releases. They eventually became known for the "Bluebird sound," which directly influenced rhythm and blues as well as early rock and roll.

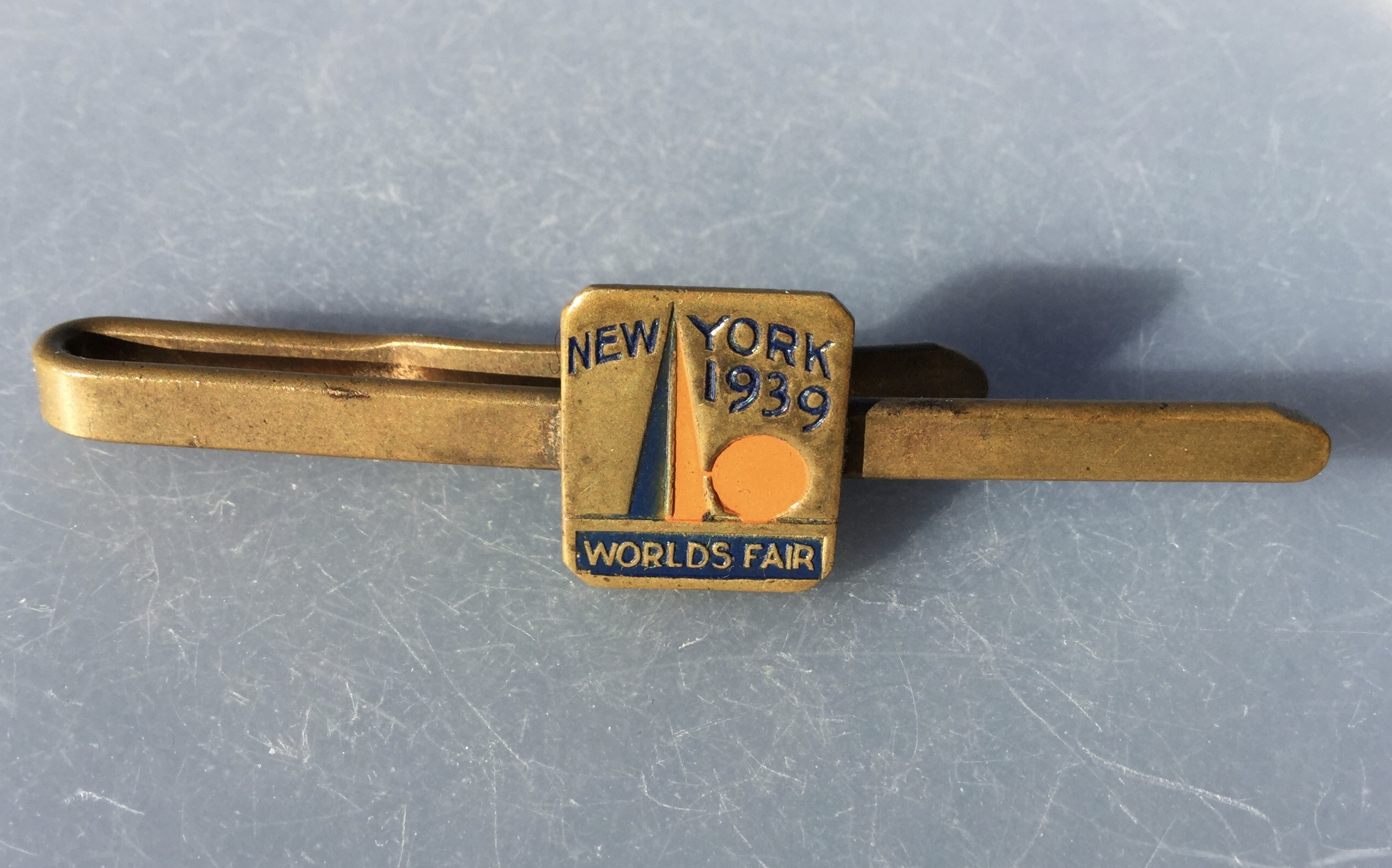
Encouraged by John Hammond to move his band to New York, Sonny Burke did so in 1938. Gozzard, the owner of this souvenir 1939 New York World's Fair tie clip, presumably acquired it at the event. It is unclear, however, if he purchased it, found it, received it as a gift or was awarded it for performing at the event in some capacity. The Savoy Ballroom was a jazz venue that did participate in the fair.

Oberstein pioneered the practice of payola, a term used in the music industry to describe the illegal practice of paying commercial radio stations to play songs without the stations disclosing the payments. (Payola can greatly influence a song's perceived popularity.) Oberstein was suddenly and unexpectedly fired in 1939 by RCA Victor. Since no explanation was ever given regarding his firing, one is left to wonder if the reason might have been directly related to his underhanded dealings with radio stations.

In an article written for Swing and Beyond, Walsh University music teacher Dennis Roden made “insightful observations” regarding Flo-Flo, a song written by Ralph Burns and in “the repertoire of the Donahue band.” Roden mentioned two trumpet solos performed by Gozzard, one of which had a “swashbuckling feel to it.”

"The brass section, under the first trumpet lead of Harry Gozzard, is the drive troop of the band. As a unit, it's 'bite' is crisp and gutty and, thanks to Gozzard's range and conception, it is really brilliant."

— Sonny Burke in DownBeat

During his career, Gozzard was mentioned in a few different articles in DownBeat magazine. He appeared in a revealing photo in one of those articles (November 15, 1940) that was rather intriguing. While staring at a newspaper, he had his arm around the lovely vocalist Lynne Sherman, who was also looking at the same paper at the time. In fact, the entire Sonny Burke Orchestra had their eyes affixed to that paper, because it had a list of men who had recently been selected in the draft. (Even though World War II had already begun the previous year, the United States would not officially get involved in it until one year later, on December 8, 1941.)

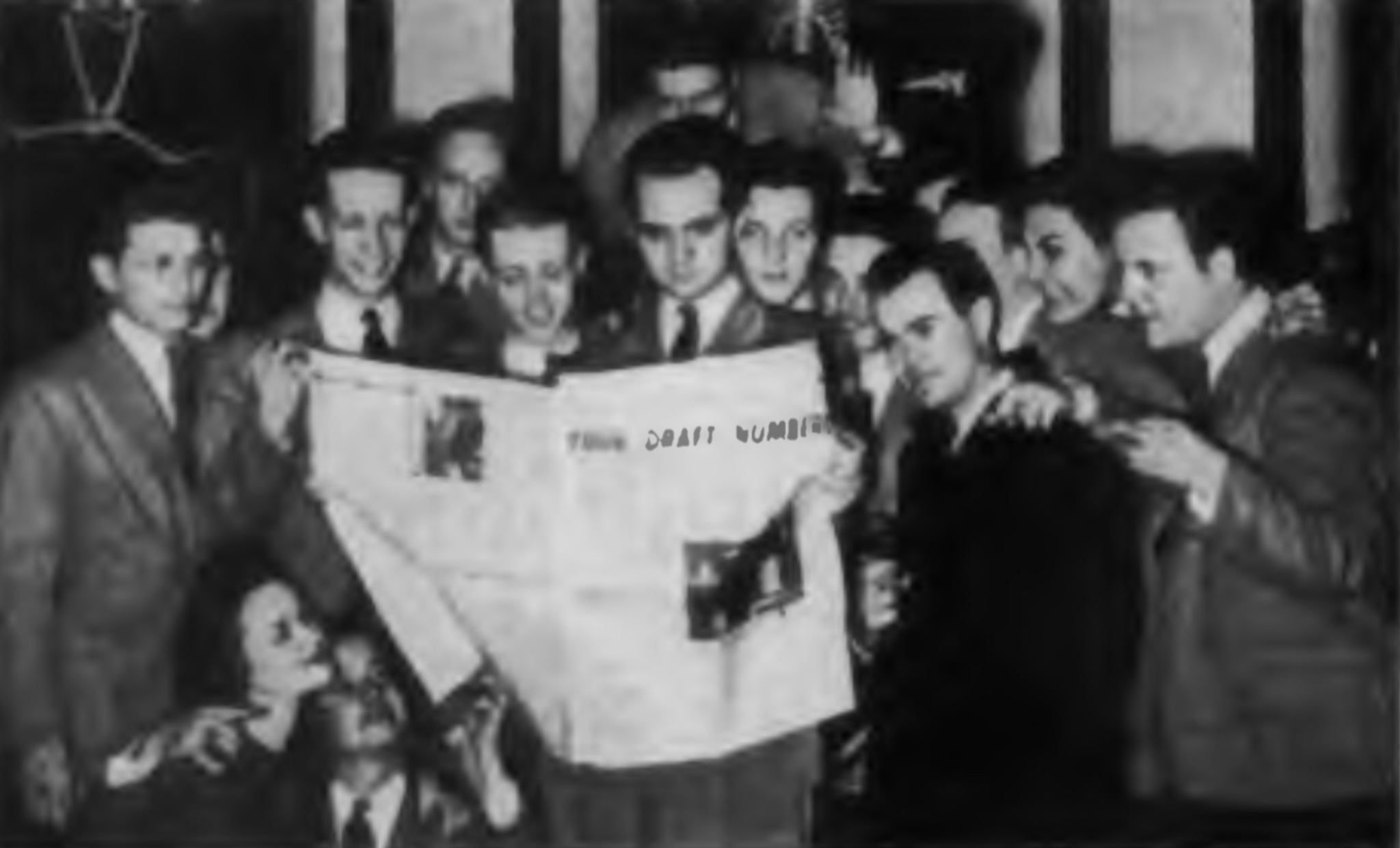
Sonny Burke band at the Roseland. Gozzard and Lynne Sherman lower-left, 1940.

That particular photographic pose doesn't necessarily reveal that Gozzard and Sherman were in some sort of personal relationship, but it does arouse a certain measure of curiosity to find out whether or not they were, especially since Sherman married another trumpet player the following year, Milton Ebbins. (They were married for 67 years. Ebbins had an illustrious career in show business and was also an insider in the Kennedy administration.)

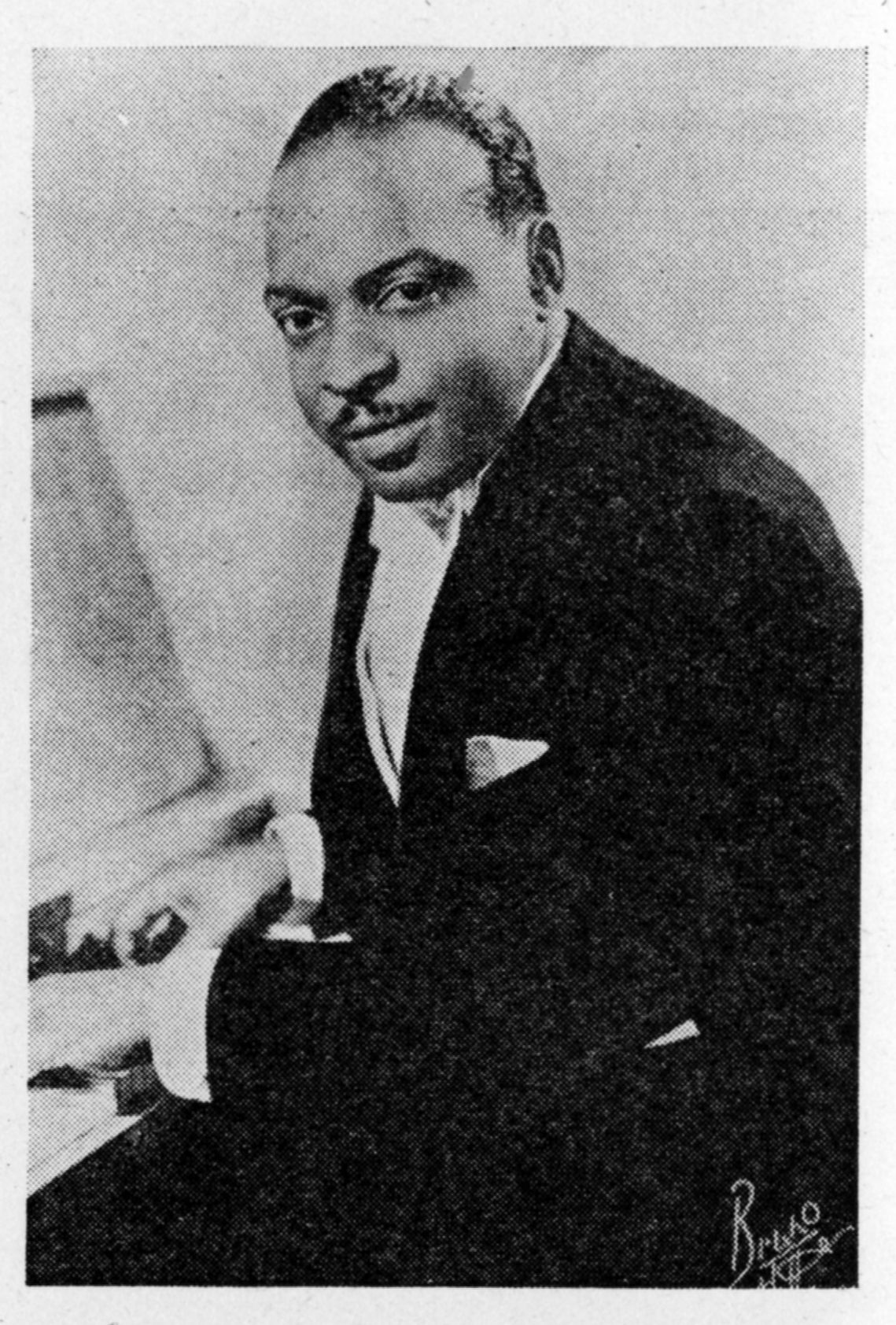
Gozzard and Lynne Sherman worked with Count Basie

Gozzard, along with Sherman and the other members of Burke's orchestra, performed together during the recording of the Vocalion record If It Wasn't For The Moon. An article in The Tampa Tribune mentioned the new record release of If It Wasn't For The Moon and the flip-side song Easy Does It, stating, "Harry Gozzard's trumpet reaches way up to here against the harmonious saxophone choir background in the rhythmic Easy Does It and the moon song bounces along nicely with Lynne Sherman performing the lyric, but good." A photo of Lynne Sherman also appeared in another DownBeat issue, September 15, 1940. The caption reads, "Sony Burke, who reviews his band at left, with chirper Lynne Sherman, a Boston chick. Both are heard, with Burke's band, on Okeh records. The combo is from Detroit..." The theme song for Burke's orchestra was Blue Sonata.

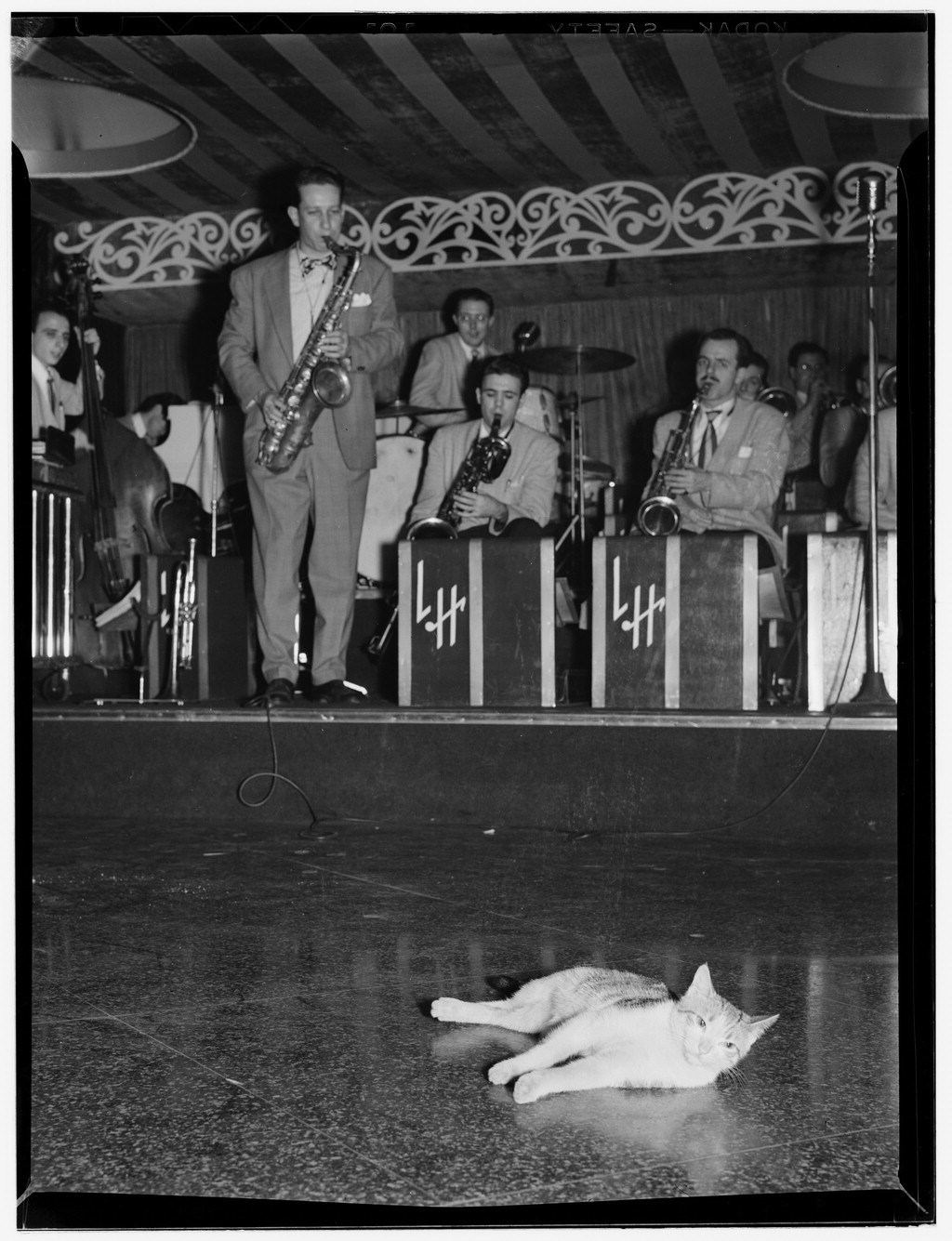
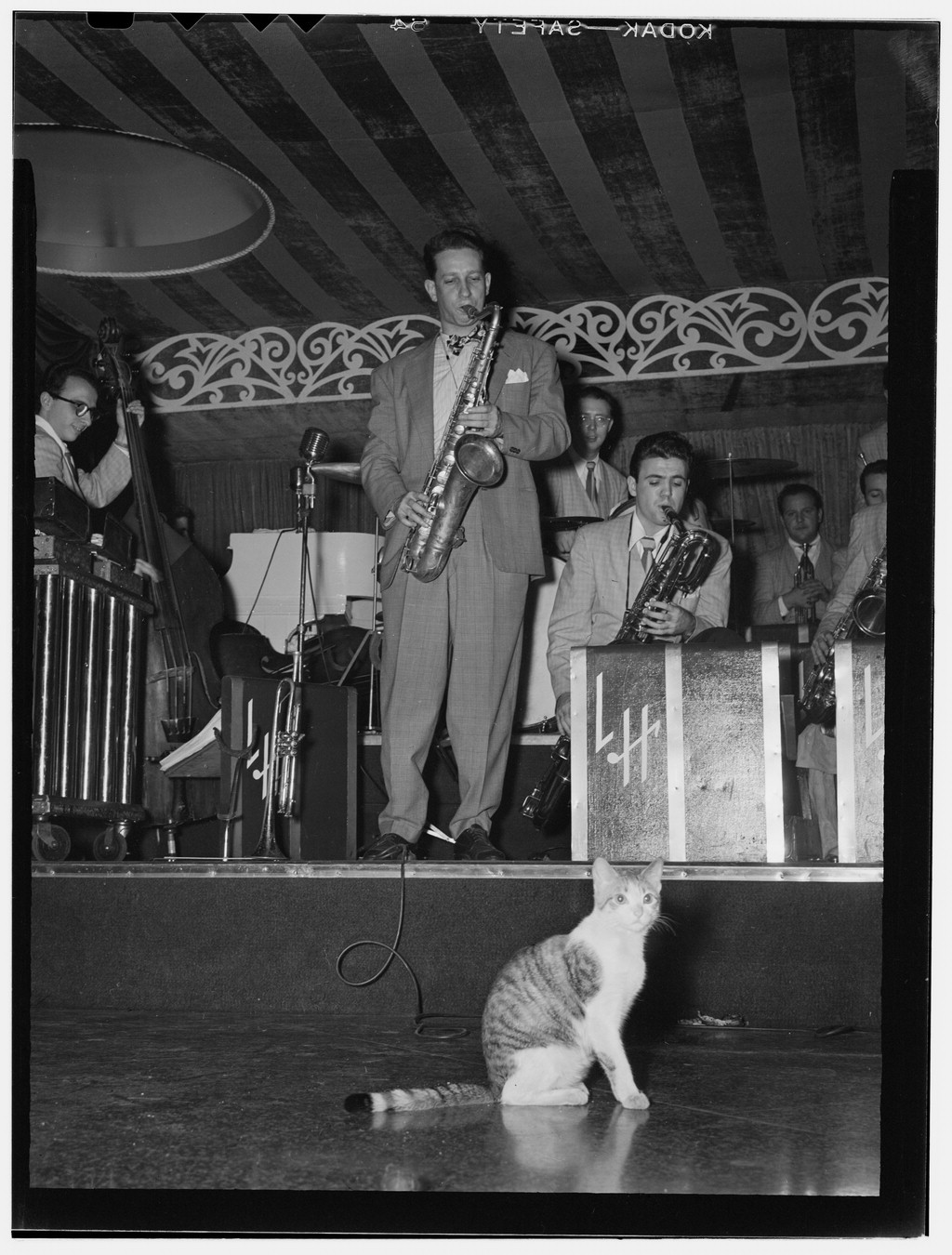
Donahue's orchestra playing for Hep the cat at the Aquarium

It was stated in a caption of a photo archived in the Library of Congress that Sam Donahue and his orchestra were booked together with Lionel Hampton and his orchestra at the Aquarium in New York in 1946. The individuals in charge of the event scheduled Donahue and his orchestra to perform in the afternoons. However, the aquarium was not open in the afternoon, so, during one of those workless afternoon sessions, Donahue and his orchestra ended up lovingly playing to an audience of one, a kitty named Hep.

A jazz record company and label founded almost 30 years later in Edinburgh, Scotland, is named Hep Records. They began as a reissue label for material from radio transcription discs, mainly big band music from the 1940s. Sam Donahue material was reissued by Hep Records. Sam Donahue And His Orchestra – Hollywood Hop is one of the reissues. Gozzard is listed as one of the instrumentalists for tracks 1–11 on that CD.

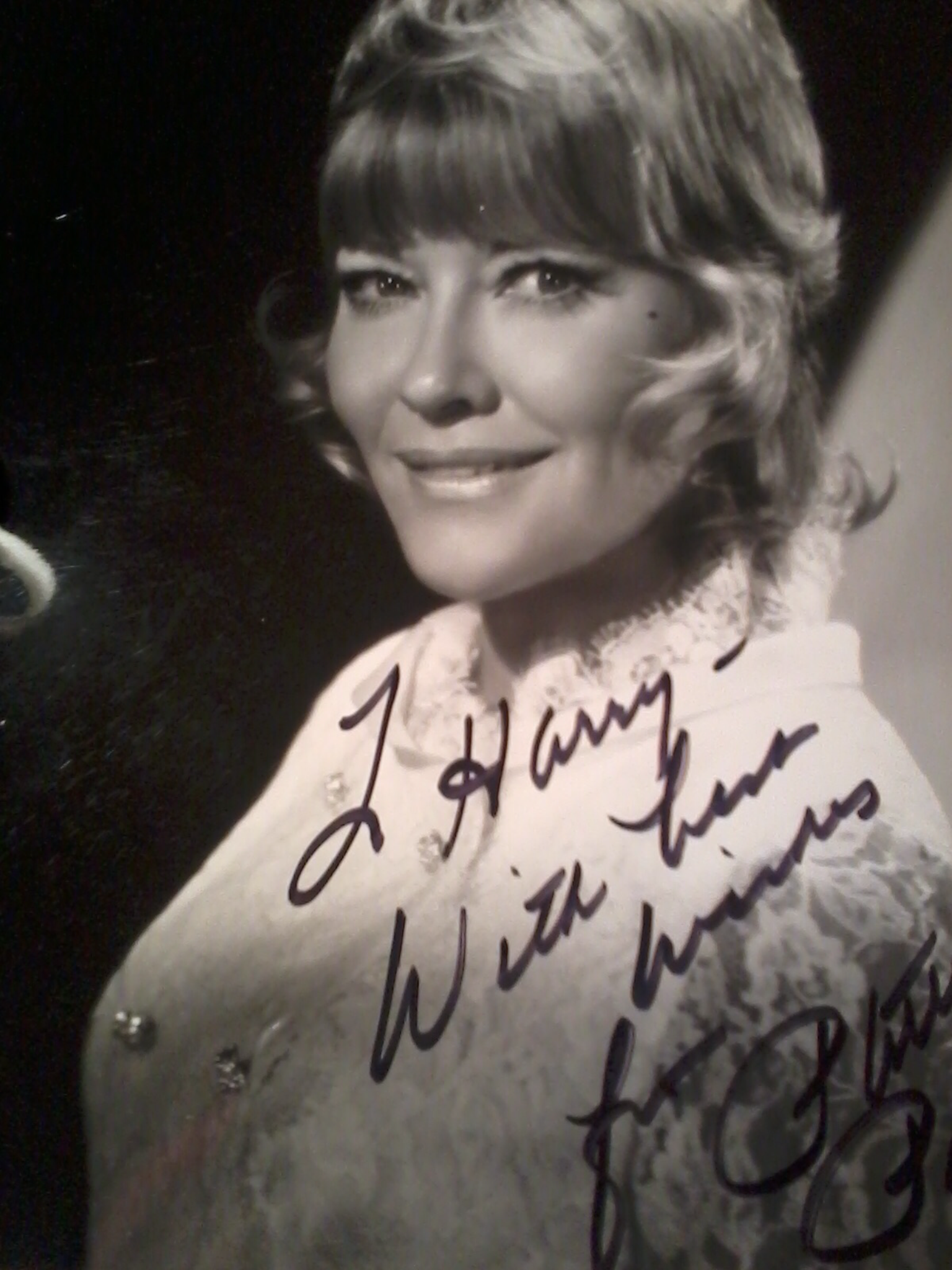
Gozzard worked with Patti Page at Elmwood Casino in 1960s

Singer and saxophonist Tex Beneke, best known for the popular songs Chattanooga Choo Choo, I've Got a Gal in Kalamazoo, Don't Sit Under the Apple Tree and Jukebox Saturday Night, traveled in 1938 to Gozzard's and Donahue's hometown of Detroit. There, Donahue heard him and mentioned him to his then-boss Gene Krupa. Not able to hire a new member at the time, Krupa referred Beneke to Glenn Miller who was putting together a new band. Beneke joined Miller's new band.

It is mentioned in the IMDb bio of Sam Donahue and also in an UPROXX article that Frank Sinatra Jr. was a vocalist for Donahue. According to a DownBeat article, "he began performing in his mid-teens for the Sam Donahue band." Sinatra later mentioned that the majority of what he learned about singing was learned through the time he spent with Donahue and the other musicians in the band. Incidentally, Sinatra Jr. was kidnapped in Lake Tahoe while on tour with Donahue. His father Frank Sinatra paid the $240,000 ransom which ultimately led to his son's release from the kidnappers.

Flo-Flo
Harry Gozzard trumpet solo follows Tak Takvorian trombone solo in a song that Ralph Burns’ composed, Flo-Flo

The Sam Donahue band had several top-10 hits: Dinah, Put That Kiss Back Where You Found It, My Melancholy Baby, The Whistler, I Never Knew, Just The Other Day, Red Wing and A Rainy Night In Rio. They are some of the songs that make up The Sam Donahue Collection – 1940–1948. Gozzard is included in the credits of that collection. I'll Never Tire of You, a 1941 recording that Gozzard played trumpet in, is featured in that collection. Acrobat Records is the label name. Marketing and distribution for the album was handled by Arista Records. An article in Jazz Journal featured that reissue album; which has a majority of Donahue's songs from the 1940s, many of which, Gozzard performed in. Online music database AllMusic also highlighted that album on their website.

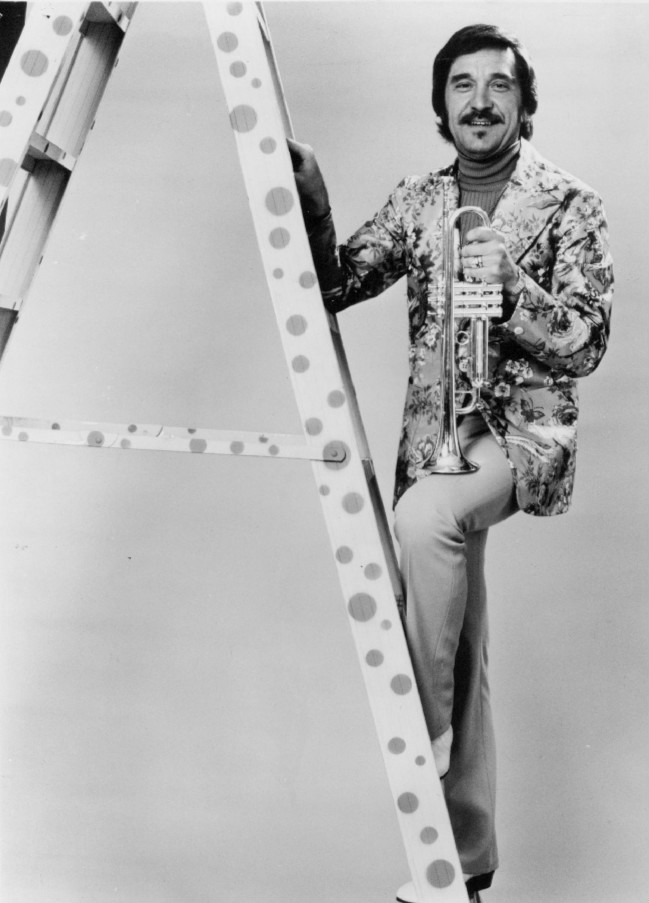
Gozzard and Doc Severinsen were in Donahue's orchestra in the late 40s

Trapeze Music & Entertainment Limited, an independent label and distributor with a loyal customer base in the UK, US and throughout mainland Europe, highlighted a quote in their reviews (borrowed from Jazzviews March 2021) by Derek Ansell, a regular contributor to Jazz Journal, stating, "Although these pieces vary tremendously from track to track the music is all well played and shines a spotlight on a musician who really deserved to be much better known than he was." In an article in The Syncopated Times, Scott Yanow, who has written for Down Beat, Jazz Times, AllMusic, Cadence, Coda and the Los Angeles Times, stated, regarding the collection of Donahue's songs, that "it is a pity that it could not have been a three-CD set that included everything" that he recorded during 1940–48. Yanow also voiced his opinion in that article regarding the musical skills of Donahue and his band members, stating that "the musicianship is consistently excellent." The songs from that album are listed in the Spotify and Apple Music listening databases. Donahue's band has six songs on radio historian Alex Cosper's list of "Top Pop Hits of 1947."

The Norwich University student newspaper compiled rave reviews that were made by music critics from Billboard, The Boston Post, The Hartford Times, Music and Rhythm, Swing and Orchestra World, basically claiming that Sam Donahue's orchestra "Is America's Band of 1942." One of the reviews stated that "'Sam Donahue's band plays good jazz the way it should be played—with a fine ensemble feeling for the music. They play in a decided colored groove and unlike most white bands that try to play that way, have succeeded in getting a relaxed approach to the music they play.'" Gozzard was listed as one of the four trumpet players in the personnel directory of band members.

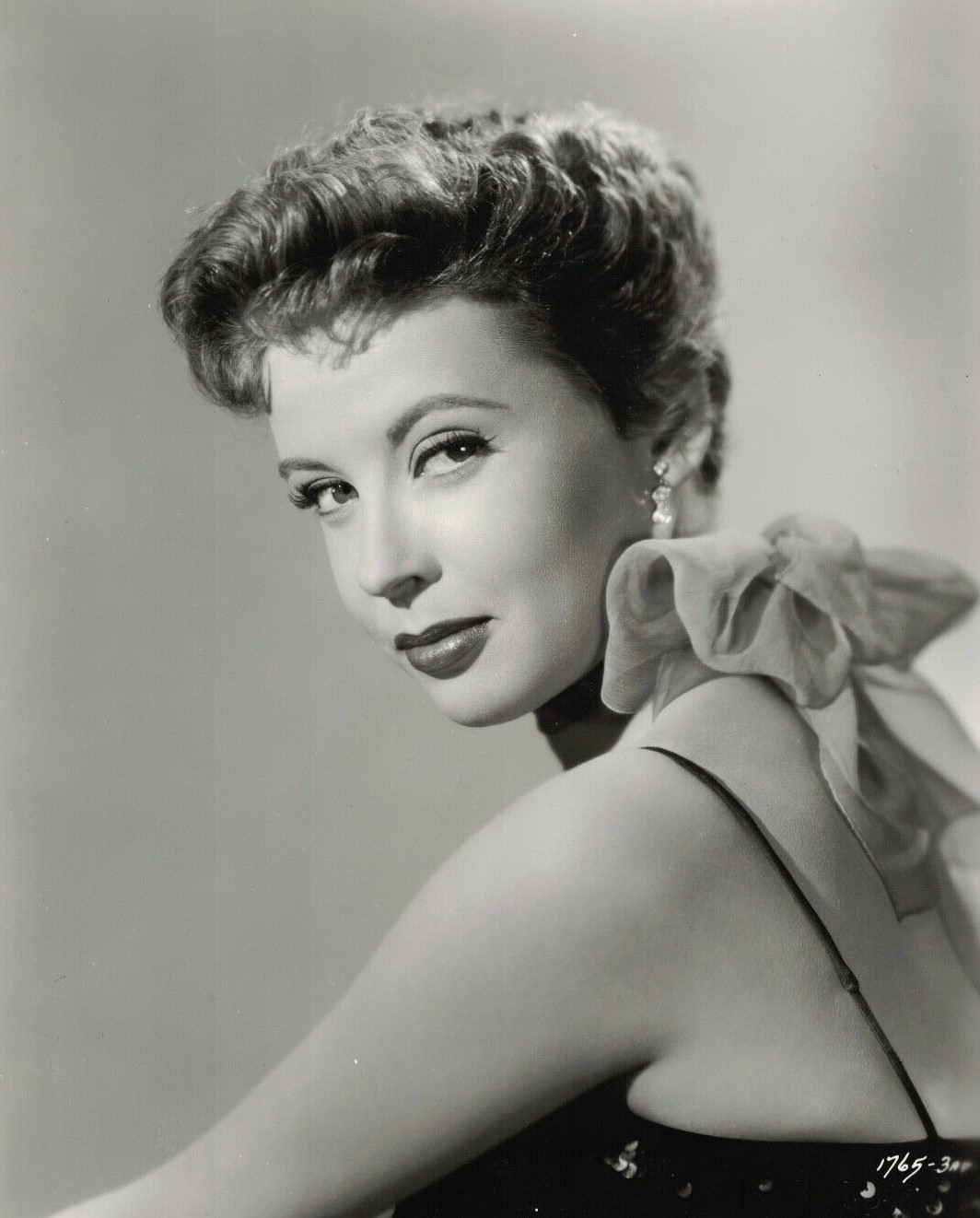
Gozzard and Gloria DeHaven worked together in 1942

English jazz discographer Brian Rust stated in his book, Jazz and Ragtime Records (1897–1942), that Gozzard was a part of the Jan Savitt Orchestra, in the early 1940s. Four Bluebird recordings were made in Hollywood during his stint with Savitt's band. Two of the recordings featured the lovely voice of MGM actress and singer Gloria DeHaven. She also sang in Bob Crosby's band and eventually had her own nightclub act.

Gozzard joined the Savitt orchestra when Donahue was drafted into the Navy during World War II. When the war ended, Donahue assembled together a cast of top musicians and formed another band. Gozzard and legendary trumpet player Doc Severinsen were two of the members of that band which began in 1946 and ended in 1951. An article in The Morning Call stated that Severinsen "joined the Sam Donahue Orchestra in 1948 and the Tommy Dorsey Orchestra in 1949."

=== 1940s – 70s: Elmwood Casino ===
Gozzard played in the Windsor, Ontario Elmwood Casino orchestra during the 1940s - 70s. Well-known celebrities, like Sammy Davis Jr., Tom Jones, Ann-Margret, Tony Bennett, Bob Newhart, Patti Page, Liza Minnelli and Sonny and Cher, performed at the Elmwood.

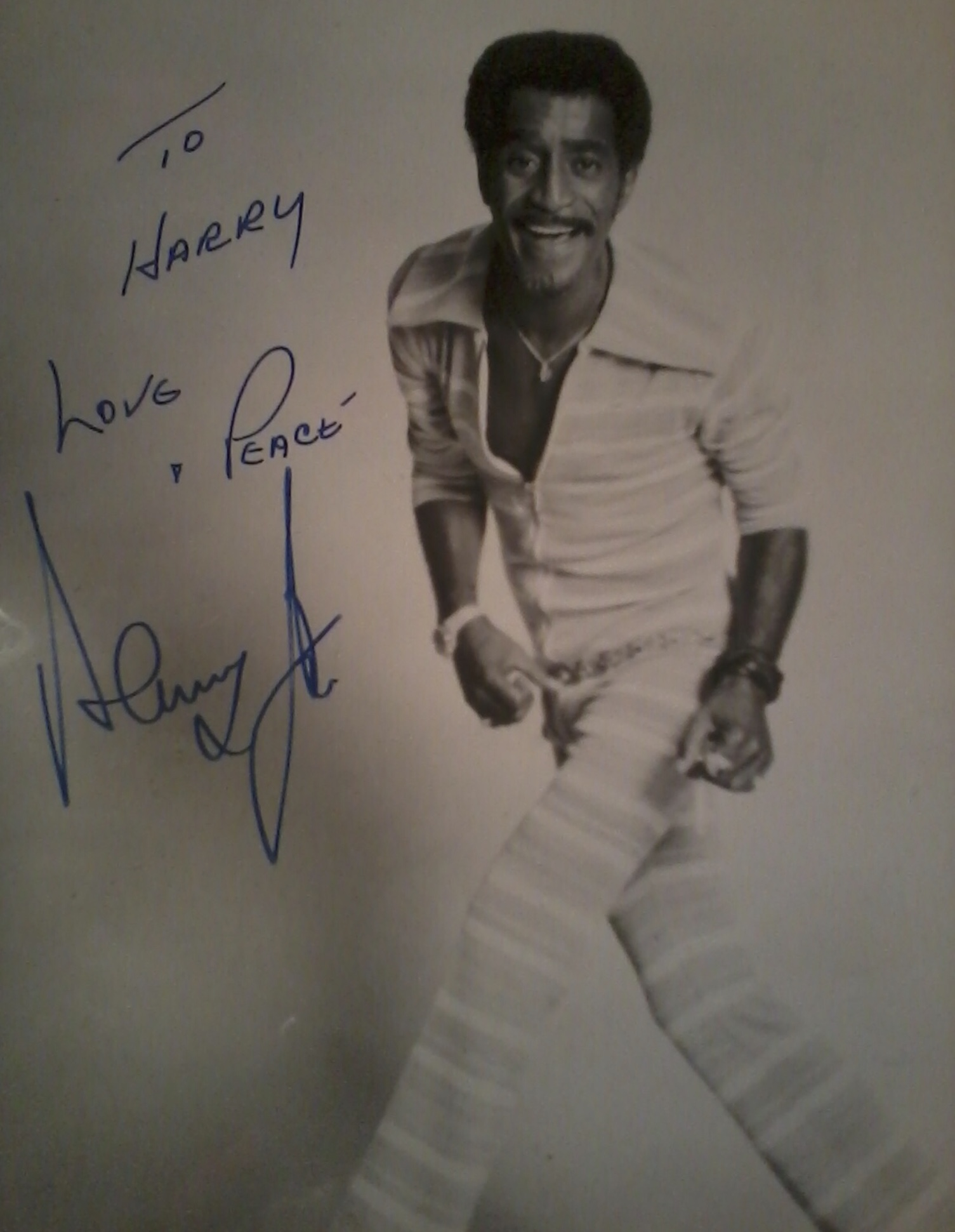
Gozzard worked with Sammy Davis Jr. at the Elmwood in 1972

During Queen Elizabeth II's Royal Tour of Canada in 1959, her entourage visited the Elmwood. It is unknown if the Queen herself was there.

On April 15, 2019, Cher made a surprise appearance on The Tonight Show Starring Jimmy Fallon. Her primary reason for doing so was "to promote The Cher Show, a Broadway musical about her life and career," stated Dan Savoie in a 519magazine article. During the impromptu interview, Jimmy Fallon asked Cher if there were any parts of her career that she disliked. Cher immediately replied with a rousing response, stating, "Yeah, umm, yeah...!" She then proceeded to talk a few moments about the tough time that she and Sonny were going through back in the late 1960s. Cher stated that "Sonny and I were really famous and our career just went off a hill. We had no money and we had no job and we owed the government $278,000. We just got in a car and headed towards Windsor, Ontario and started our life again." They went to Windsor due to the fact that they were booked for a three-week engagement (September 1969) at the Elmwood Casino. Since they "were broke-ass broke," Sonny and Cher "stayed in a seedy motel eating in their room."

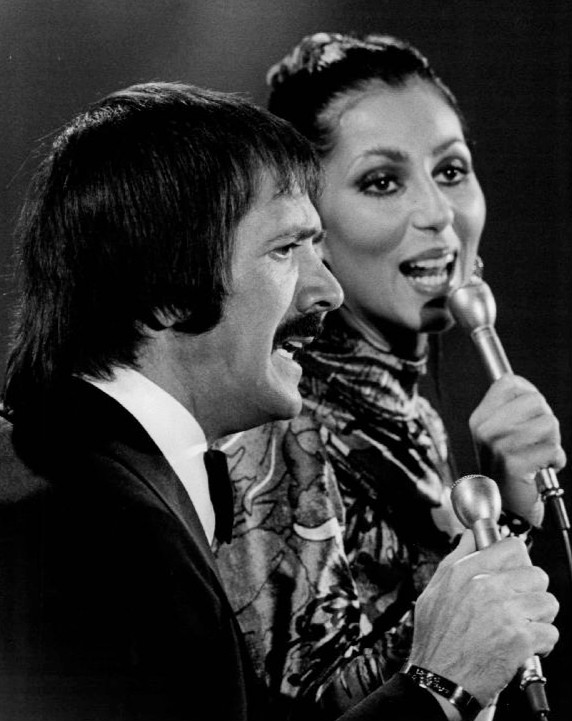
Sonny and Cher performed at the Elmwood a few years prior to this photo being taken of them performing on The Sonny and Cher Show

A defining moment happened during that engagement at the Elmwood that started to turn things around for them. Savoie stated that "they slowly developed an act that would change everything." The "act" was Cher would wear a gown and Bono would wear a tuxedo. Cher stated that, at first, "the people hated us...I finally got so pissed off I turned around – like sometimes you do – and started to make the band laugh. And the band will laugh at anything." Soon after their Elmwood engagement, they took the new comedic concept to Vegas. It was a success.

Early in his career, Bob Newhart had a one-week engagement at the Elmwood. He stated in a Mister Kelly's interview in 2017 that he "'never got a laugh.'" Even though his comedic performances didn't bring the house down, Newhart still managed to speak well of the Elmwood audiences, stating, "They were very polite...Canadians...very nice." In David Steinberg's book, Inside Comedy, Newhart stated that poor performance at the Elmwood "'almost drove me back to accounting.'" Shortly after the Elmwood engagement, he had another gig in Winnipeg that "went well." That ray of hope persuaded him to "'stay in the business.'"

=== 1960s - 70s: Boblo Island, Tiger Stadium, Mackinac Island ===
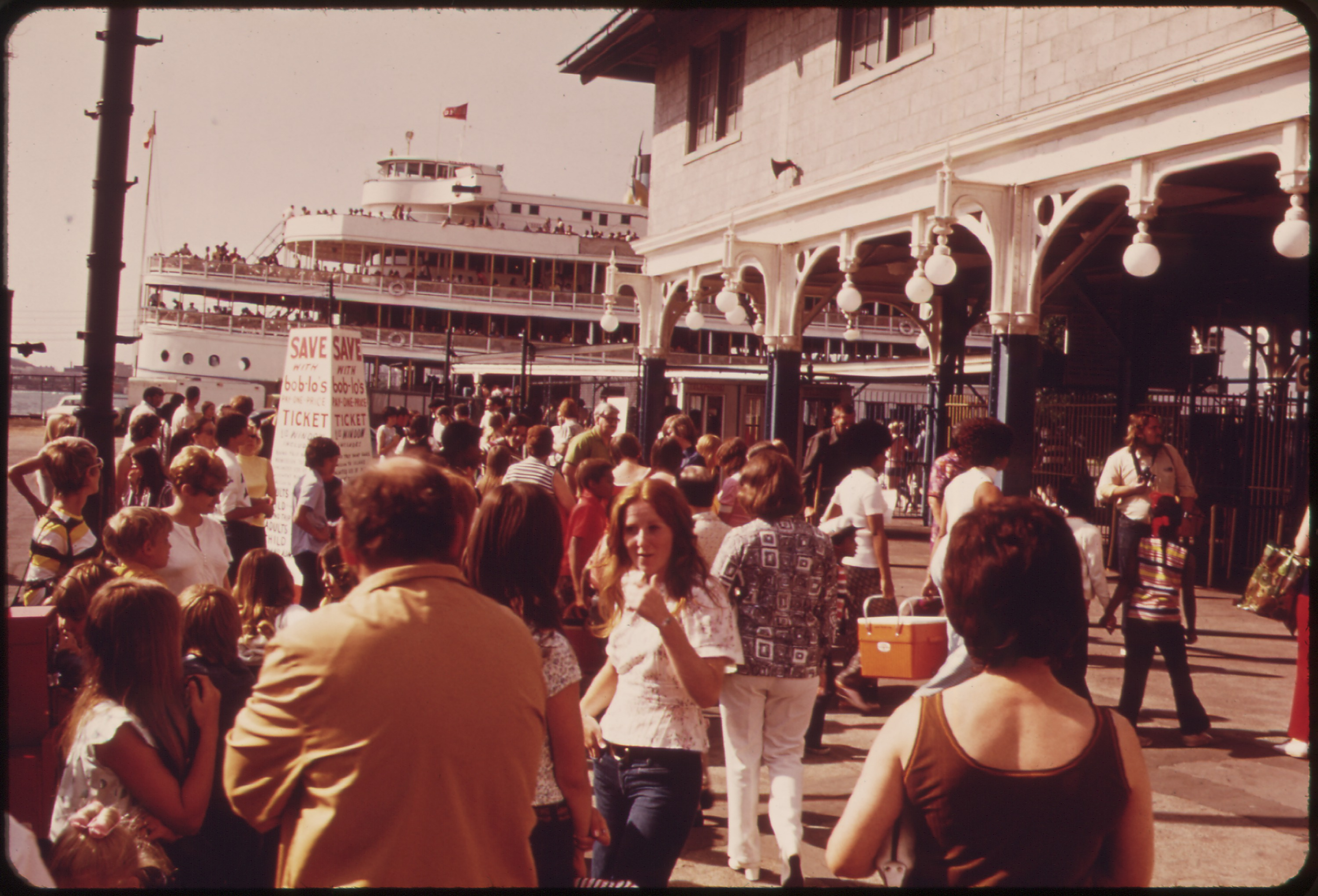
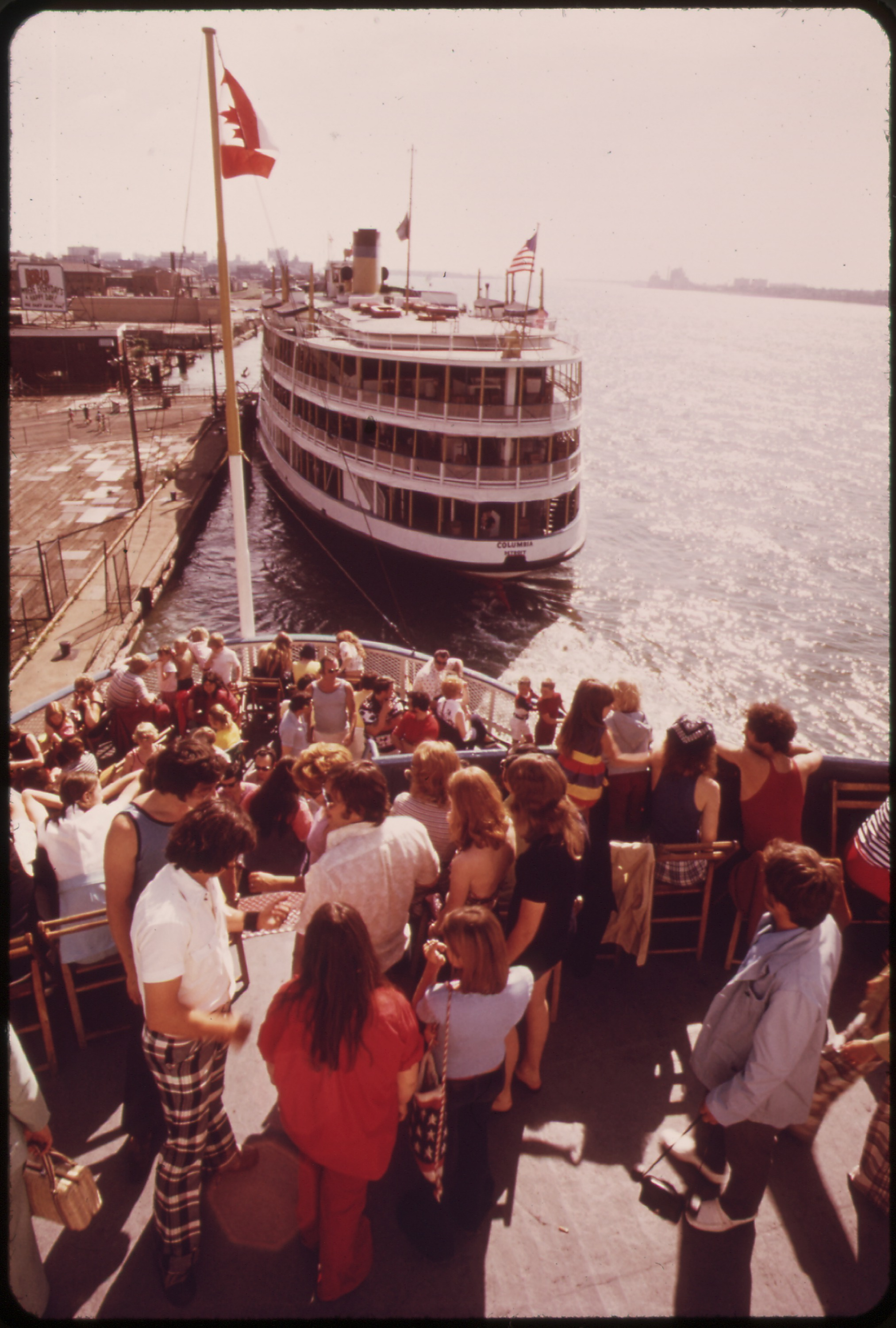
SS Ste. Claire (left) and SS Columbia in background (right). These two stalwart sister steamships ferried passengers up and down the Detroit River on a daily basis for several years. They were also occasionally used for weekly midnight cruises on Lake St. Clair.

During the 1960s, Gozzard played in the orchestra on the two steamers (SS Columbia and SS Ste. Claire) that ferried passengers (on Detroit River) to and from Boblo Island Amusement Park. The SS Columbia was "the first steamboat in the United States with a proper ballroom."

Gozzard was in the band that performed during the Al Kaline Day celebration at Tiger Stadium in Detroit, Michigan, on August 2, 1970. Mel Tormé sang Thanks For The Memory.

During the 1970s, Gozzard performed in the Grand Hotel orchestra situated on Mackinac Island. The romantic fantasy drama film Somewhere in Time was shot on location there in the 1970s as well. Five U.S. presidents have visited the hotel and island.

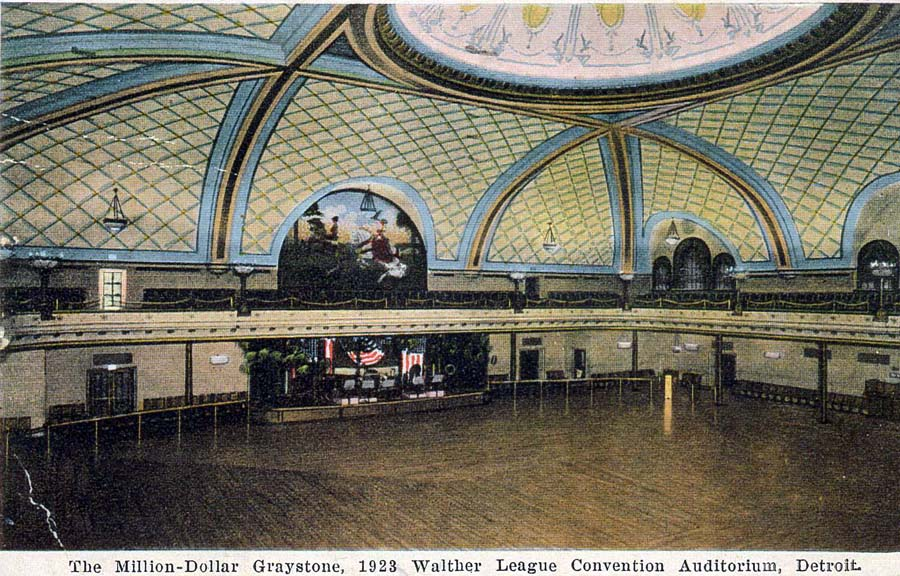
The Graystone Ballroom

Gozzard also performed in "Detroit's Million Dollar Ballroom," officially known as the Graystone Ballroom. It was one of the six great ballrooms in Detroit. Steven Loza, who has served on the national screening committee of the Grammy Awards for many years, mentioned in his book (The Jazz Pilgrimage of Gerald Wilson) that Wilson told him that the Graystone was "one of the finest ballrooms in the world." Jazz journalist Jack Ambicki stated in the International Musician that the Graystone was one of the three "leading spots" in "the Mid-West" where the Music Corporation of America was "booking its top bands on one-night stands" in "the early thirties." After years of neglect, the Graystone fell into disrepair and was subsequently demolished (1980) in order to make way for a McDonald's restaurant.

Gozzard was a member of the Detroit Federation of Musicians organization for 50-plus years. He became a member in 1934, at 18 years of age. He was awarded a commemorative pin for his 50th year being affiliated with them. They are a part of the American Federation of Musicians.

== Family ==
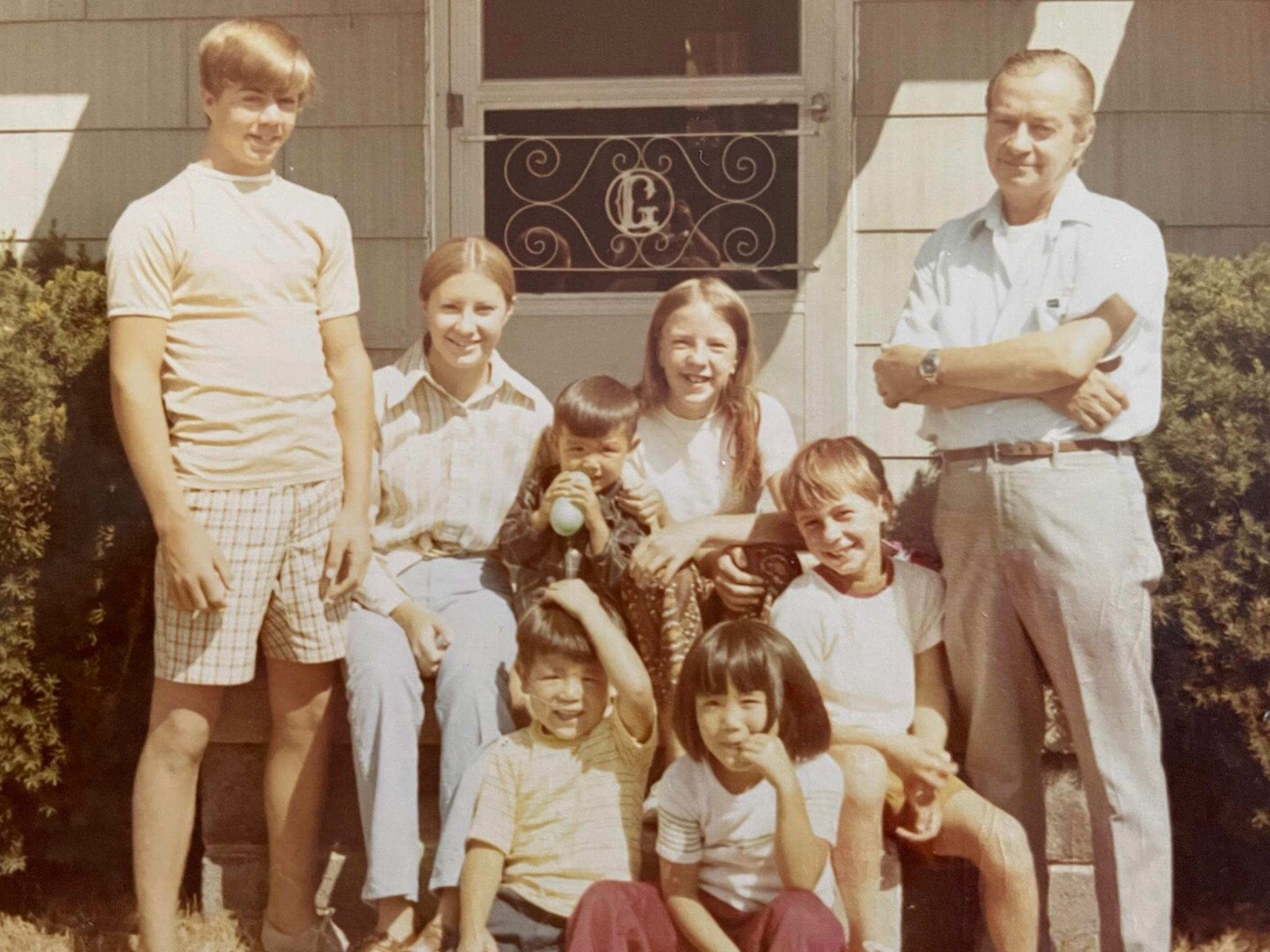
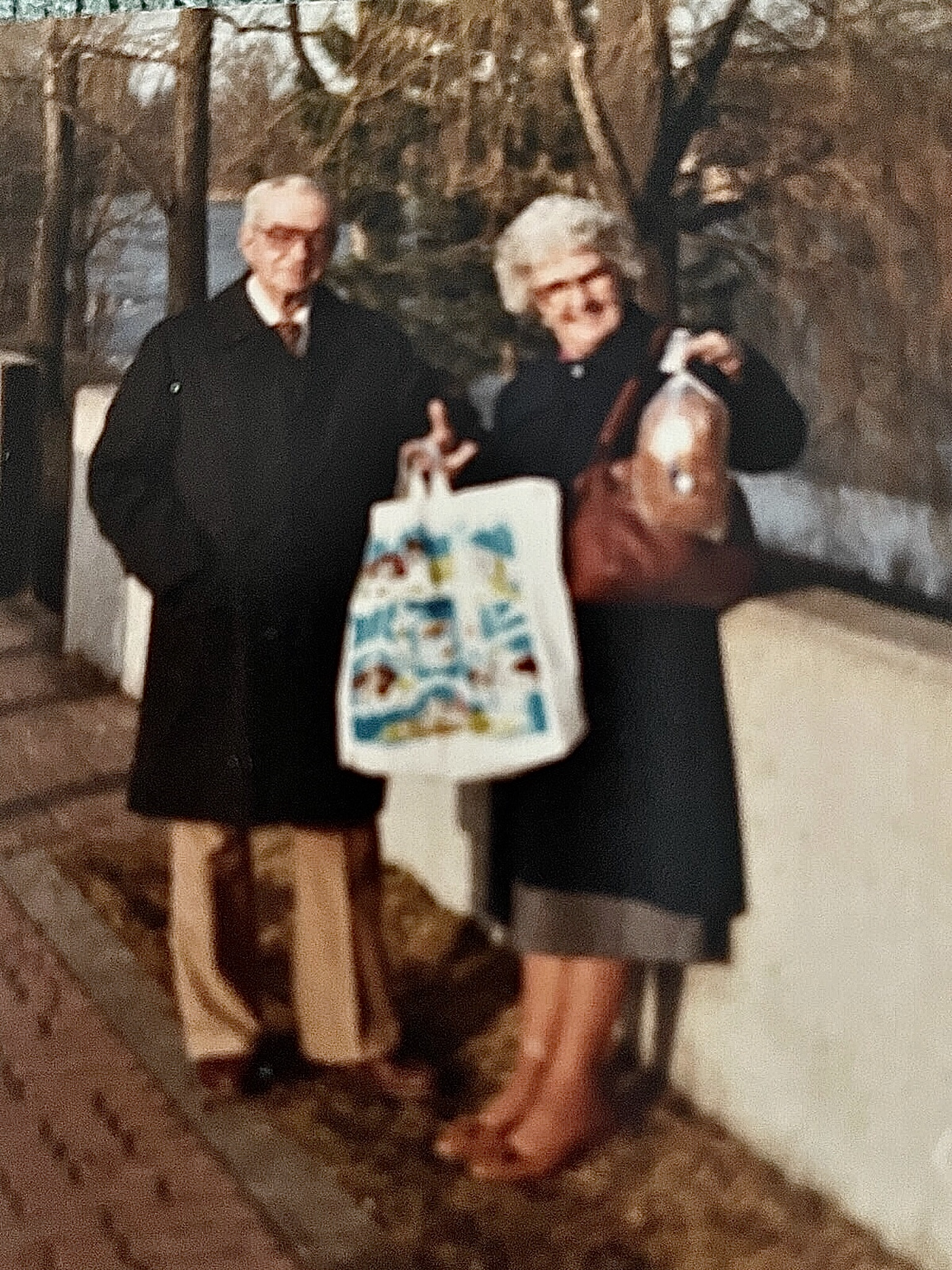
Gozzard, four of his children and children of friends, 1970 (left) and Gozzard and wife Wilda in Frankenmuth, Michigan, 1980 (right).

On May 17, 2022, Gozzard was the subject of discussion in the first of a two-part iHeart radio show created by Our American Stories. (The interview was conducted by Montie Montgomery. He, along with Madisyn Darracott and Lee Habeeb worked together in a collaborative effort to produce the project.) The interviewee, George Gozzard, who is the youngest child of Harry Gozzard, divulged personal insights regarding particular points of interest regarding the life of his father.

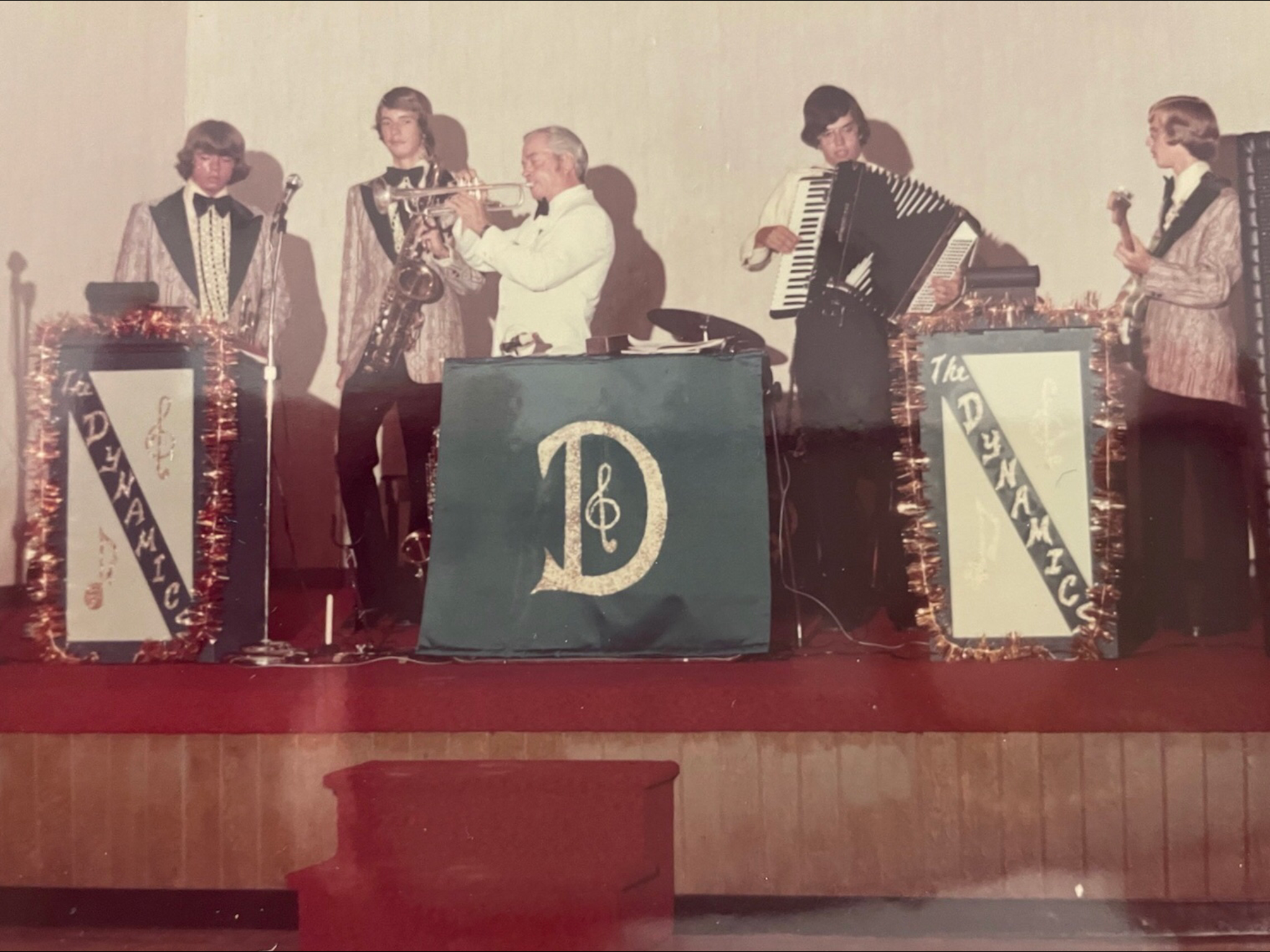
Gozzard's impromptu performance at daughter's wedding, 1974

The "absolute coolest memory" George shared about his father was the time when he and his brother Greg travelled 300 miles up north to visit their father on Mackinac Island. The ferry that they were on during their foggy voyage to the island was almost involved in a collision with a very large, unidentified Lake freighter. Many years after that incident occurred, George hypothetically proposed the remote possibility that the freighter involved in that incident "could have been" the legendary SS Edmund Fitzgerald. His only reason to support his conjecture was that the Fitzgerald had not yet sunk in Lake Superior.

== Discography ==
=== As sideman ===
With Sam Donahue

- Sam Donahue Collection (48 tracks – Bluebird Records, Capitol Records)
- Hollywood Hop (26 tracks – Hep Records)
- Beat the Band to the Bar (27 tracks – Sanctuary)
- lt Counts A Lot (Okeh, 1940)
- Lonesome (Okeh, 1940)
- Four Or Five Times (Okeh, 1940)
- Skooter (Okeh, 1940)
- Loafin' on a lazy day (Victor, 1941)
- Au reet (Victor, 1941)
- They still make love in London (Victor, 1941)
- Saxophone Sam (Victor, 1941)
- Do You Care (Victor, 1941)
- Beat the Band to the Bar (Victor, 1941)
- Pick Up the Groove (Victor, 1941)
- Six Mile Stretch (Victor, 1941)
- Coffee and Cakes (Victor, 1941)
- Flo-flo (Victor, 1941)
- Half a heart is Worse than None (Victor, 1941)
- I'll Never Tire of You (Victor, 1941)

With Sonny Burke

- l May Be Wrong (Vocalion, 1939)
- Lament (Vocalion, 1939)
- The Last Jam Session (Vocalion, 1939)
- Tea For Two (Vocalion, 1939)
- Pick A Rib (Vocalion, 1940)
- I Never Purposely Hurt You (Vocalion, 1940)
- If It Wasn't For The Moon (Vocalion, 1940)
- Easy Does It (Vocalion, 1940)
- Jimmy Meets The Count (Okeh, 1940)
- Can I Be Sure? (Okeh, 1940)
- Carry Me Back To Old Virginny (Okeh, 1940)
- Blue Sonata (Okeh, 1940)
- The Count Basically (Okeh, 1940)
- More Than You Know (Okeh, 1940)
- Jumpin' Salty (Okeh, 1940)
- Minor de Luxe (Okeh, 1940)

With Count Basie

- Count Basie – The Alternative Takes (25 tracks – Neatwork)

With Jan Savitt

- lf I Cared A Little Bit Less (Bluebird, 1942)
- Romance a la Mode (Bluebird, 1942)
- Manhattan Serenade (Bluebird, 1942)
- If You Ever, Ever Loved Me (Bluebird, 1942)
