= I'll Never Tire of You =

1941 song by Richard Kollmer, Cy Walter and Jimmy Dobson

Single by Sam Donahue Orchestra
- B-side: "Flo-Flo"
- Published: September 6, 1941 Musicana, Inc., New York
- Recorded: 12 November 1941
- Studio: RCA Victor Studios, 155 East 24th Street, NYC
- Genre: Big band, swing
- Length: 2:57
- Label: Bluebird (US)
- Songwriters: Cy Walter, Richard Kollmar, Jimmy Dobson

"I'll Never Tire of You" is a 1941 big band song written by Richard Kollmar, Cy Walter and Jimmy Dobson. The song was copyrighted on September 6, 1941. It was recorded in New York City on November 12, 1941, by the Sam Donahue Orchestra as a RCA Victor - Bluebird 78 rpm single. There were four takes. The master recording was recorded in Studio 2. Victor matrix number is BS-068193. The label name and number is Bluebird B-11479. The Catalog number is B-11479-A. The format size of the master is 10 inches. Andy Blaine was the sole vocalist. (Blaine was also the vocalist for another well-liked Donahue song that was recorded on the same day that I'll Never Tire of You was recorded, Half a Heart is Worse Than None.)

The song on the other side of the I'll Never Tire of You recording is titled "Flo-Flo". It was also performed by the Sam Donahue Orchestra and was also recorded on the same day that I'll Never Tire of You was recorded. Flo-Flo was composed by Academy, Emmy and Tony Award winner Ralph Burns. According to an article in the LA Times, he admitted that he learned the most about jazz by transcribing the works of Count Basie, Benny Goodman and Duke Ellington.

"I'll Never Tire of You" is featured in The Sam Donahue Collection 1940-48. Acrobat Records is the label name. Marketing and distribution for the album was handled by Arista Records. An article in Jazz Journal featured that reissue album; which has a majority of Donahue's songs from the 1940s. Online music database AllMusic also highlighted that album on their website. Trapeze Music & Entertainment Limited, an independent label and distributor with a loyal customer base in the UK, US and throughout mainland Europe, highlighted a quote in their reviews (borrowed from Jazzviews March 2021) by Derek Ansell, a regular contributor to Jazz Journal, stating, "Although these pieces vary tremendously from track to track the music is all well played and shines a spotlight on a musician who really deserved to be much better known than he was." In an article in The Syncopated Times, Scott Yanow, who has written for Down Beat, Jazz Times, AllMusic, Cadence, Coda and the Los Angeles Times, stated, regarding the collection of Donahue's songs, that "it is a pity that it could not have been a three-CD set that included everything" that he recorded during 1940-48. Yanow also voiced his opinion in that article regarding the musical skills of Donahue's bands, stating that "the musicianship is consistently excellent." The Sam Donahue Collection 1940-48 is marketed via major retail outlets, including Amazon, Target and Barnes & Noble. Several lesser-known retail outlets, like MVD Entertainment Group and Collectors Choice Music, also market it.

== History ==
Transcription disc of Cy Walter's piano version of I'll Never Tire of You, which was the media used to air on NBC Radio affiliate radio stations throughout the U.S. and Canada

Cy Walter, one of the three song writers of I'll Never Tire of You, was an American café society pianist based in New York City for four decades. According to an article in the Brattleboro Reformer, his long radio and recording career included both solo and duo performances, and stints as accompanist for such elegant vocal stylists as Greta Keller, Mabel Mercer, and Lee Wiley. Frank Sinatra was also mentioned.

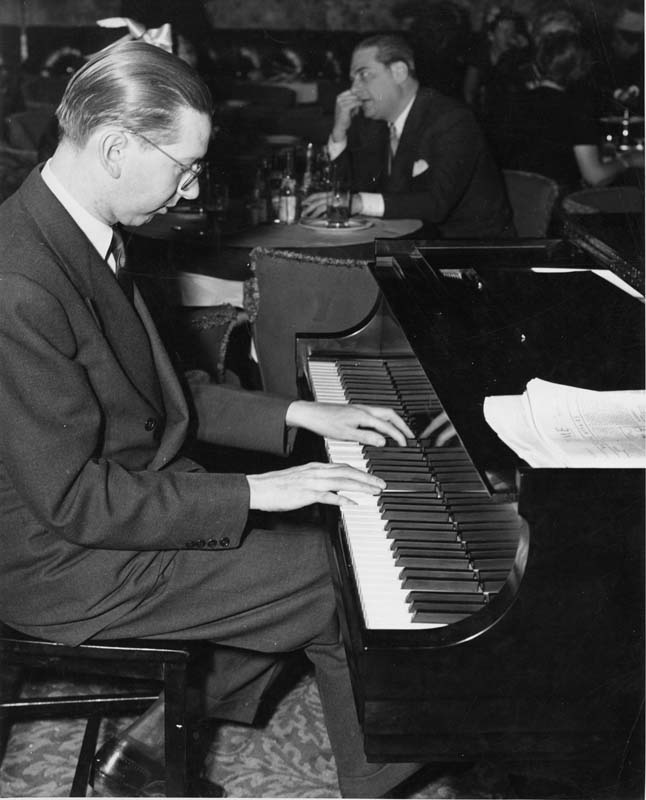
Cy Walter, one of the composers of I'll Never Tire of You, at the Copacabana night club in New York City, 1949

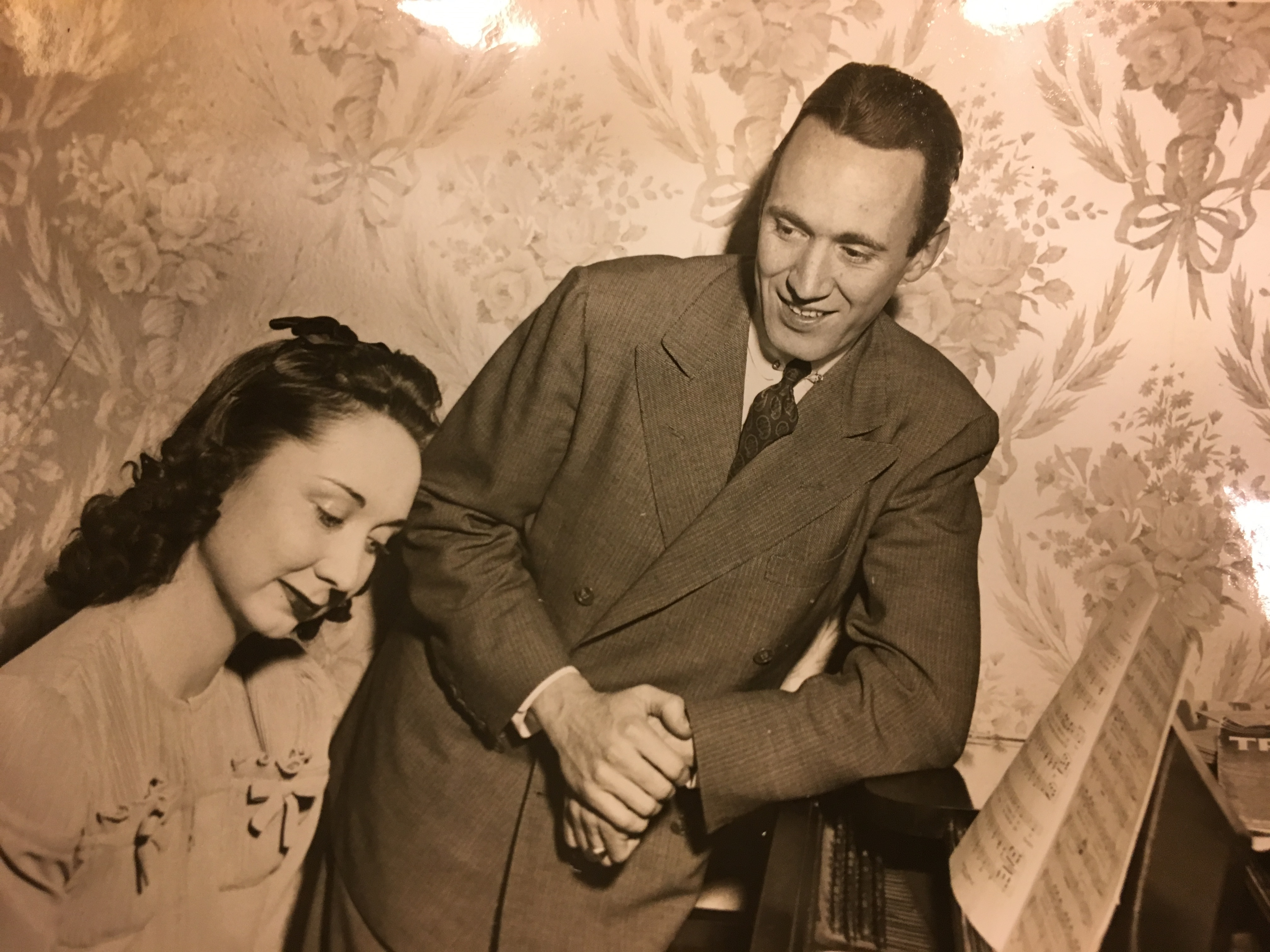
Richard Kollmar, one of the composers of I'll Never Tire of You, is looking fondly at his fiancée Dorothy Killgallen playing the piano

The Cy Walter Centennial Celebration, held at the Cutting Room in New York City on September 27, 2015, was featured in a Broadway World article two days later. The article mentioned that I'll Never Tire of You was performed "with conversational esprit" during the celebration, by tenor Doug Bowles and pianist Alex Hassan.

Cy Walter's piano version of "I'll Never Tire of You" was part of the now-defunct NBC Radio Network music. It was recorded on RCA Thesaurus transcription discs for the sole purpose of broadcasting on radio stations. These discs, which were advertised in magazines like Down Beat and others, provided material—from station-identification jingles and commercials to full-length programs—for use by local stations, which were affiliates of one of the radio networks. Efforts were made as early as 1936 to consolidate the RCA Victor transcription service with NBC's independent transcription service within the NBC radio network. NBC's Thesaurus catalog system and library of recordings was not completely merged with RCA's catalog until 1939 when the consolidation was completed in an effort to compete with rival transcription services which were available at the Mutual, Columbia and World Broadcasting Systems.

The other two composers of "I'll Never Tire of You", Jimmy Dobson and Richard Kollmar, also had creative careers. Although Kollmar was also noted for being the husband of the noted columnist Dorothy Kilgallen, he also worked as a singer, actor, and producer. (For 18 years, Kollmar and Kilgallen worked together in a syndicated radio program called Breakfast with Dorothy and Dick. According to an article in Irish America magazine, "Fans all over the country listened to the couple's banter about their night life, children, and china patterns.")

It was stated in an archived article (dated November 26, 1965), which was highlighted at the end of a 2018 article in The Greeneville Sun that young "James ('Jimmy') Dobson," fresh out of Tusculum University, moved to "New York with his eye on Broadway." "I'll Never Tire of You" was written by him, Walter and Kollmar not long after he arrived in New York. (Kollmar also attended Tusculum University.) Since there are no other mentions of him in the Discography of American Historical Recordings, it is safe to assume that "I'll Never Tire of You" was Dobson's only published song during that era. He later became a very successful actor, appearing in many movie and television roles.

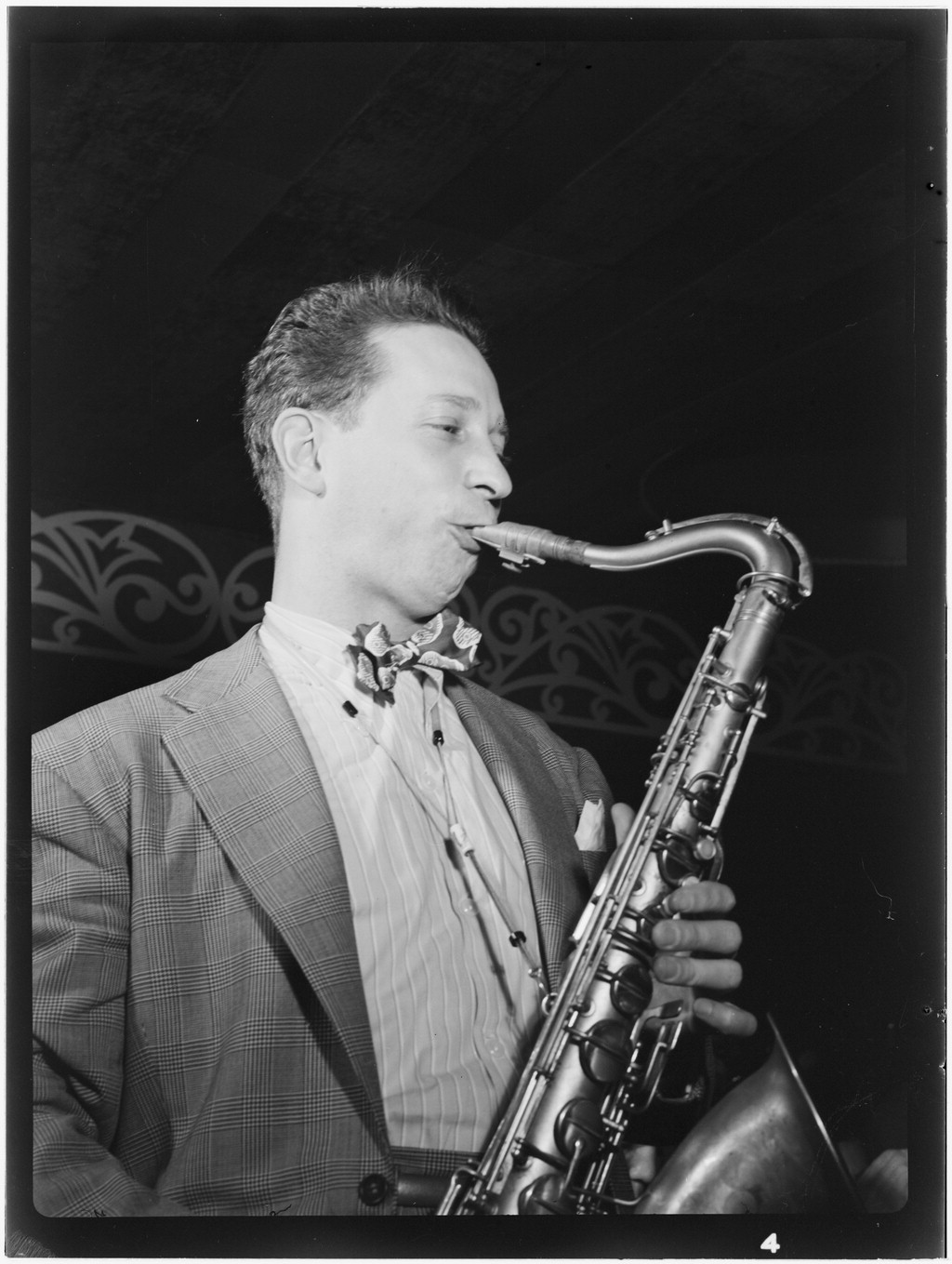
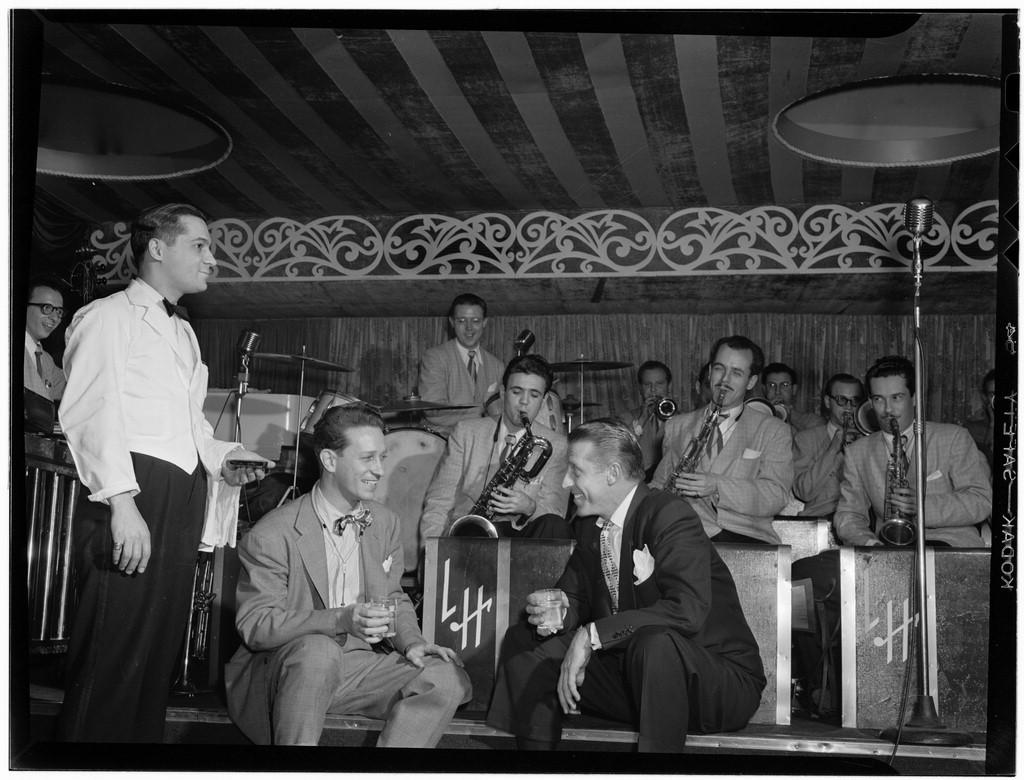
Sam Donahue playing the saxophone. (left) Waiter Nick Callonus standing, Donahue and fellow band leader Stan Kenton sitting in front of Sam's orchestra. (right) Library of Congress photos (4932362730 and 5269521138, respectively) that were taken at the Aquarium in New York City in 1946.

== Personnel 1941 recording ==
Talented trombonist Tak Takvorian joined Donahue's band in April 1941, replacing Eddie Bert. At the time, Bert couldn't read music. Since the 1941 recording sessions were about to begin (April, May and November), Donahue not only needed good trombone players, but ones who could also read the sheet music of brand-new songs. ("I'll Never Tire of You" was one of those songs.) Thanks to Donahue, Bert did eventually learn how to read music. After turning down offers from Harry James and Tommy Dorsey, Bert joined Charlie Barnet's band. According to an article in Jazz Times, Bert "hopscotched from Barnet to Woody Herman to Stan Kenton to Benny Goodman and back to Barnet and so on." By doing so, he "encountered most of the outstanding musicians of his day." Another notable Donahue band member who was also a part of the "I'll Never Tire of You" recording was trumpeter Harry Gozzard. He also performed with Count Basie and many other well-known musicians.

- Vocalist: Andy Blaine
- Saxophones: Sam Donahue, Paul Petrilla, Harry Peterson, Bill Nichol, Max Kriseman
- Trumpets: Harry Gozzard, Peter Abramo, Andy Blaine, Mitchell Paull
- Trombones: Tak Takvorian, Ken Miesel, Dick LeFauve
- Piano: Wayne Herdell
- String bass: Nick Manley
- Guitar: John Jordan
- Drums: Hal Hahn
