= James Dobson (actor) =

American actor (1920–1987)

- Broadway headshot, circa 1940
- Born: James McAmis Dobson; October 2, 1920; Greeneville, Tennessee, U.S.
- Died: December 6, 1987 (aged 67)
- Occupation: Actor
- Years active: 1941–1987

James "Jimmy" Dobson (October 2, 1920 – December 6, 1987) was an American actor. He appeared in numerous Broadway, film, and television roles. Metacritic stated that Dobson was a “supporting actor; he often played military men and appeared in many Westerns.” He is best-known as Lieutenant Pudge McCabe in the John Wayne film Flying Leathernecks. He was the dialogue director for the McMillan and Wife television series and also played various roles in a few of the episodes. He was Steward Anderson in The Love Boat TV series.

== Early life and education ==
The oldest child of Leta (nee McAmis) and Benjamin Dobson, James "Jimmy" Dobson was born in Greeneville, Tennessee, on October 2, 1920. His father was a longtime postal employee in the city of Greeneville. James had a younger brother named John Dobson, who is also deceased. John was a librarian at the University of Tennessee.

The Greeneville Sun stated that Dobson "played ball, loved to swim, and loved to ride his bike." At an early age, Dobson realized that he had an innate ability to entertain people. He was an active participant in the Greeneville High School drama club. After graduation, he enrolled at Tusculum College, now known as Tusculum University. Dobson was in the college drama club. He was also in the drama club while attending the University of Tennessee. There, he won a trip to Hollywood. The Associated Press stated, "Dobson decided to become an actor after visiting Hollywood."

== Career ==
Before moving to Hollywood, Dobson first moved to New York City. There, he worked as a stage actor for Life with Father, The Firebrand of Florence, and Mr. Adam. He was also a voice actor for radio shows, most notably as Archie Andrews. He, along with Cy Walter and Richard Kollmar, wrote a song together, "I'll Never Tire of You". It was recorded in New York City on November 12, 1941, by the Sam Donahue Orchestra as a RCA Victor - Bluebird 78 rpm single. Dobson eventually moved to Hollywood after living in New York City for a few years. He appeared in numerous film and television productions. John Wayne and he worked in a few films together. Dobson appeared with Ronald Reagan and Nancy Davis in Hellcats of the Navy.

== Personal life ==
Dobson lived in California during his acting career, but occasionally returned to his hometown of Greeneville to visit family and friends. The Greeneville Sun stated that "he liked to stroll along Main and Depot Streets, meeting and talking to people. He also liked to bring friends along to visit the hills of East Tennessee." Actress and dancer Ann Miller, who had dated Howard Hughes, Conrad Hilton, and Louis B. Mayer, was one of those friends. Dobson and she were in a relationship for a while. She often accompanied him when he visited Greeneville. During one of the visits, the two went to a public pool in Greeneville wearing risqué swimsuits, which prompted the management to summon local law enforcement to have them peaceably removed from the premises.

== Death ==
Dobson died of a heart attack on December 6, 1987, at the age of 67. He was cremated. The Greeneville Sun stated, "his ashes were scattered in the beloved surf below his seaside home."

== Filmography ==
Film and television
| Year | Title | Role | Notes |
|---|---|---|---|
| 1950 | The West Point Story | Cadet | |
| 1951 | On Moonlight Bay | Army sergeant | |
| 1951 | The Tanks Are Coming | George 'Ike' Eisenhower | |
| 1951 | Flying Leathernecks | Pudge McCabe | |
| 1952 | For Men Only | Bartholomew "Beanie" Brown | |
| 1952 | Okinawa | Emerson | |
| 1953 | Girls of Pleasure Island | Marine | |
| 1954 | I Love Lucy | Pete | Episode: "Ricky's Movie Offer" |
| 1955 | Cult of the Cobra | Nick Hommel | |
| 1956 | Friendly Persuasion | Rebel soldier | |
| 1957 | Hellcats of the Navy | Ens. Bob Altman | |
| 1957 | Gunsmoke | Joe Harpe | Episode: "Blood Money" |
| 1958 | Jet Attack | Lt. Sandy Wilkerson | |
| 1960 | The Great Impostor | Sailor | |
| 1961 | Armored Command | Arab | |
| 1963 | Captain Sindbad | Iffritch | |
| 1963 | Come Fly With Me | Flight Engineer Teddy Shepard | |
| 1963 | Miracle of the White Stallions | Southern GI | |
| 1965 | Harlow | Counterman | |
| 1965 | Mutiny in Outer Space | Dr. Hoffman | |
| 1966 | Country Boy | George Washington Byrd | |
| 1968 | Track of Thunder | Bowser Smith | |
| 1969 | The Undefeated | Jamison | |
| 1969 | A Dream of Kings | Doctor | |
| 1971 | What's the Matter with Helen? | Cab driver | |
| 1974 | Impulse | Clarence | |
| 1985 | St. Elsewhere | Mr. Norton | Episode: "Watch the Skies" |
