= Cy Walter =

American café society pianist (1915–1968)

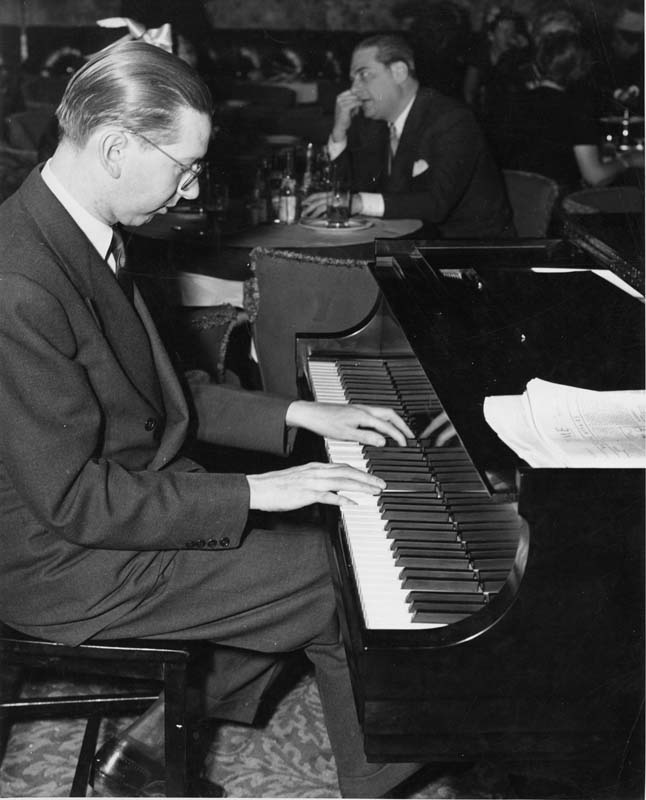
- Walter in 1949

Background information
- Born: Cyril Frank Walter; September 16, 1915; Minneapolis, Minnesota
- Died: August 18, 1968 (aged 52) New York, New York
- Genres: Popular music, Jazz
- Occupation: Musician
- Instrument: Piano
- Years active: 1934–1968
- Labels: Liberty Music Shops, Atlantic, Columbia, MGM, RCA

Cyril Frank Walter (September 16, 1915 – August 18, 1968) was an American café society pianist based in New York City for four decades. Dubbed the "Art Tatum of Park Avenue," he was praised for his extensive repertoire (with an emphasis on show tunes) and improvisatory skill. His long radio and recording career included both solo and duo performances, and stints as accompanist for such elegant vocal stylists as Greta Keller, Mabel Mercer, and Lee Wiley.

== Career ==
Born in Minneapolis, Minnesota, Walter grew up in a musical family and received early classical training from his mother, a professional piano teacher. In 1934, after a summer job playing piano on the overnight New York to Boston night cruise, he enrolled briefly at New York University but soon accepted an offer to join the Eddie Lane Orchestra on a full-time basis. Four years later, he formed a two-piano team with Gil Bowers and played at Le Ruban Bleu when it opened. Solo engagements followed at upscale bars and supper clubs like the Algonquin, the Blue Angel, and Tony's on West 52nd Street. In the late 1930s and early 1940s, Walter explored other musical surroundings: as pit pianist with the Jerome Kern musical "Very Warm for May," as accompanist for Mabel Mercer and Greta Keller, and as leader of his own orchestra at the night club La Martinique. He briefly ran his own club, Cy Walter's Night Cap, before being called to a fourteen-month stint in the Maritime Service.

From 1944 to 1952, Walter appeared regularly (as part of a duo piano team with Stan Freeman, and later with Walter Gross) on ABC's popular weekly radio series Piano Playhouse. Reaching an international audience over Armed Forces Radio, and with commentary by Milton Cross, Playhouse featured (in addition to the anchor duo) notable guest pianists from the jazz and classical worlds, teamed up "in all sorts of unusual combinations as duos, trios and quartets."

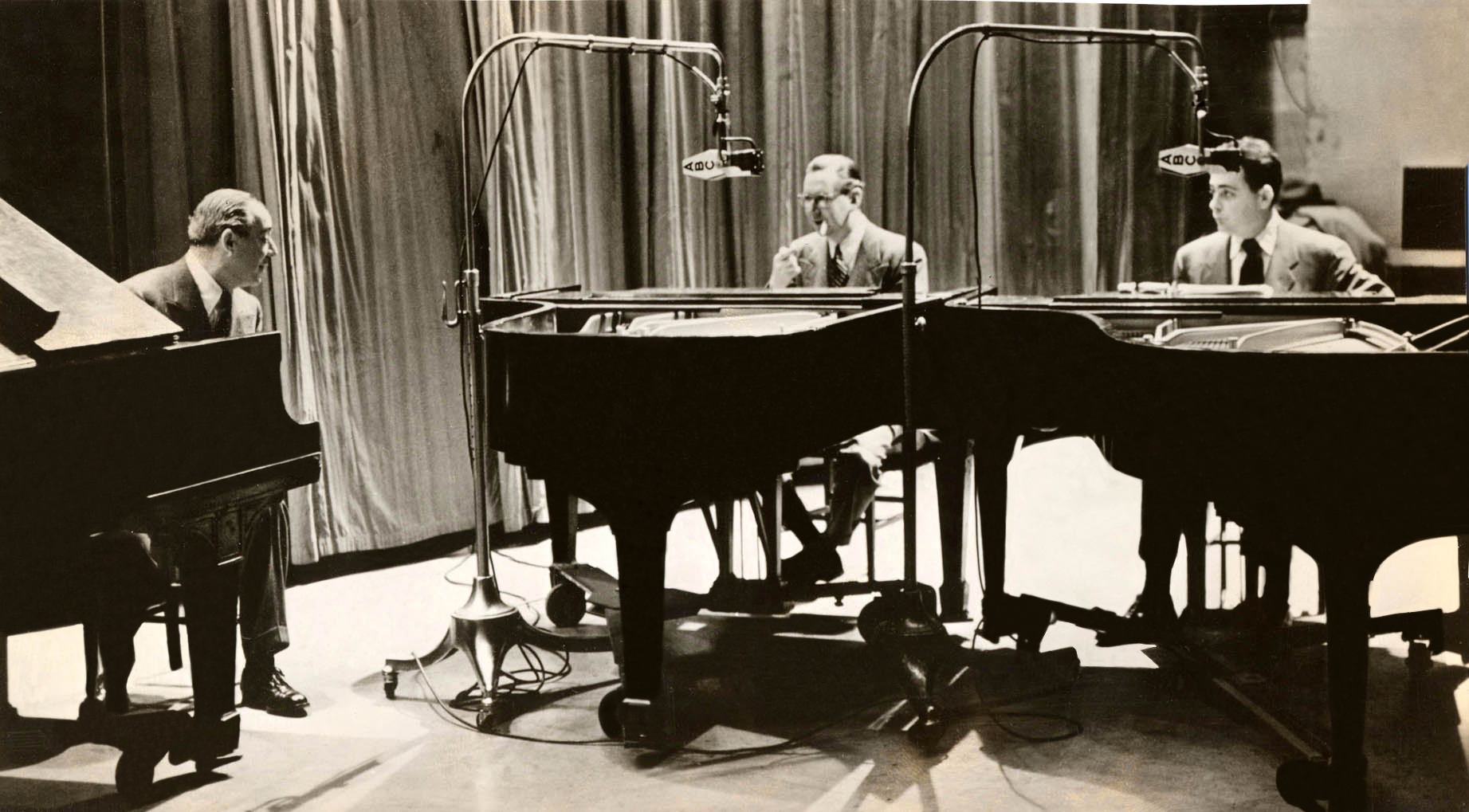
Richard Rodgers, Cy Walter, and Stan Freeman on the Piano Playhouse Show, performed before a live audience, circa late 1940s.

Walter found an ideal showcase for his talents when he opened the elegant Drake Room of New York's Drake Hotel on December 21, 1945. The following year, a Metronome profile noted that "The Cy Walter appeal can be summed up with two t's: taste and the tune. ... Sinatra, Whiting and other bigtimers are constantly dropping by... to pick up on some obscure show tune that he has resurrected from the vast storehouse of his musical mind... obscure little melodies that never made the Hit Parade and great timeless songs that have been lost in the shuffle." Walter continued at the Drake Room from 1945 until 1951, building a reputation as the "dean of Manhattan's piano professors," according to The New Yorker (1950).

By then a fixture on the New York music scene, Walter spent the rest of the 1950s performing at various Manhattan venues and recording both as a solo pianist and accompanist—for example, on Ahmet Ertegun's fledgling Atlantic label. While not a prolific songwriter, he also crafted a number of songs in an advanced harmonic style. For example, he composed both words and music for "Some Fine Day" (1953), and collaborated with Alec Wilder on "Time and Tide" (1961) and Chilton Ryan on "You Are There" (1960) and "See a Ring Around the Moon" (1961).

In 1959, Walter was invited to resume playing solo piano at the Drake Room. This six-nights-a-week engagement would continue until a week before the pianist's death from lung cancer in 1968. "I guess by now I know how to work the Drake Room," he quipped with typical understatement to an interviewer in 1966.

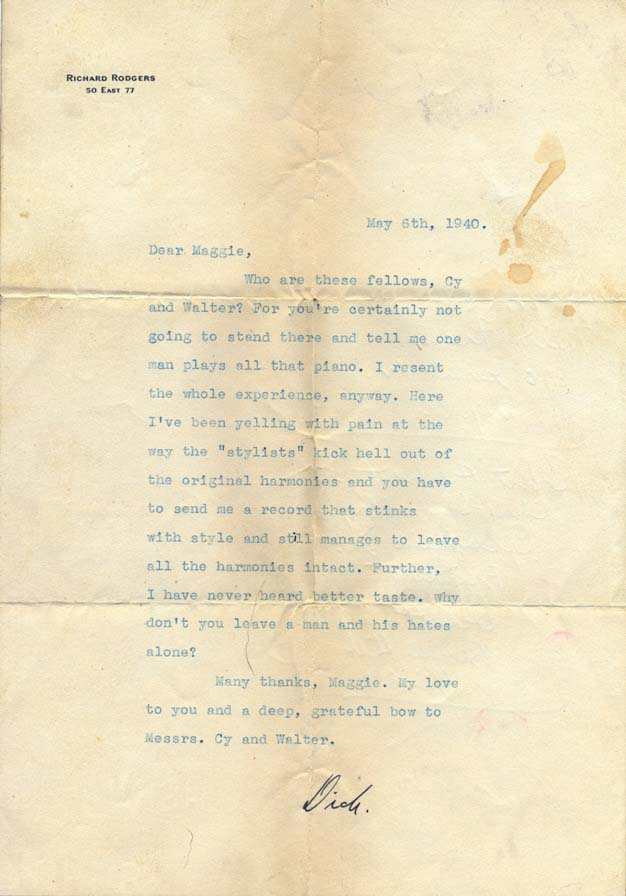
Walter fan letter from Richard Rodgers, 1940

The Cy Walter Centennial Celebration and CD Release Party, held at The Cutting Room in New York City on September 27, 2015, showcased Cy Walter's original compositions as performed by eighteen top vocalists, pianists, and dancers. The show, which was produced by Cy's son, Mark Walter, featured duo piano performances and original scores by the twelve-piece Cy Walter Celebratory Orchestra, led by music director Tedd Firth, and was a tremendous success. Also celebrated was the release of a two-volume CD set by Harbinger Records entitled Cy Walter: Sublimities Centennial Tribute. A Broadway World review published two days following the event noted that "The jam-packed, three-hour festivity included instrumentals, vocals, and even an exhilarating exhibition [of Fred Astaire's swing trot dance, called The Astaire], and of The Astaire [song], whose melody was composed [by Cy Walter, with lyrics by Andrew Rosenthal] at the behest of the icon himself to launch his dance studios." The article also highlighted performances of other Cy Walter original compositions, including I'll Never Tire of You (written with Richard Kollmar and Jimmy Dobson), observing that it was performed with "conversational espirit" by vocalist Doug Bowles and pianist Alex Hassan. The entire show was professionally captured by filmmaker Michael Stever and sound engineer Rubin Nizri of New Record Studios, and can be viewed in its entirety on The Cy Walter Foundation's YouTube channel.

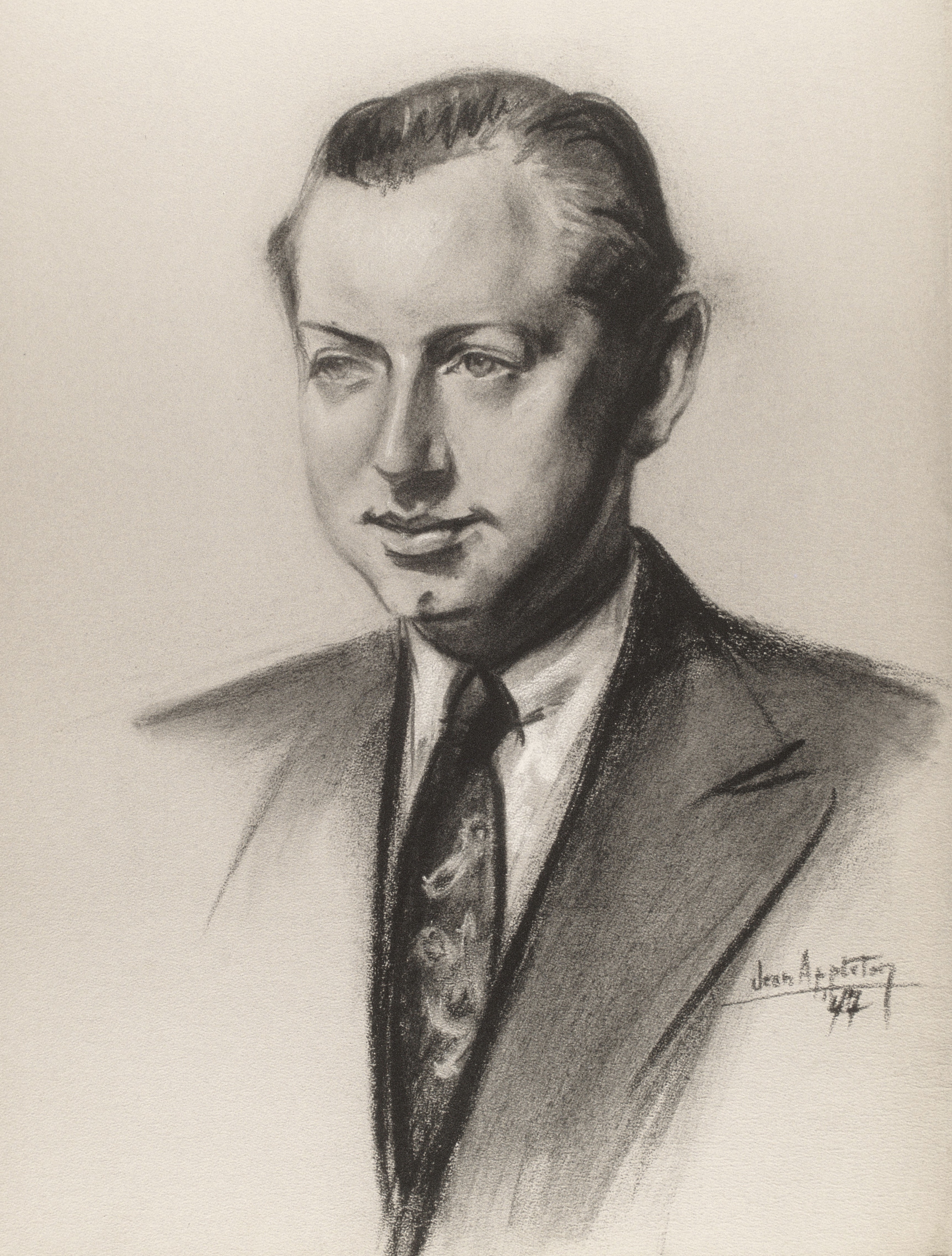
Jean Appleton charcoal portrait of Walter, 1947

Terry Teachout, a noted author and drama critic for The Wall Street Journal, penned an excellent January 14, 2016 article in the Journal profiling Cy Walter entitled Cy Walter's Cocktail Piano, With A Twist. Teachout also highly praised the recent release of the Cy Walter: Sublimities CDs, and cited Richard Rodgers' awed assessment of Walter's talent in what was, in essence, a fan letter: "I have never heard better taste". Closing his profile, Teachout, a pianist himself, exhorted his readers to "[l]isten to the gently rippling 1946 performance of Rodgers' Falling In Love With Love on the first 'Sublimities' CD and you'll hear what he meant. No, it's not jazz, but who cares? It's music, and it's gorgeous—with or without an olive."

== Discography ==
=== Solo ===
- Piano Stylings of Cy Walter (Liberty Music Shops LMS-1007, early 40s)
- Mabel Mercer Sings, Cy Walter Plays, Selections From George Gershwin's Porgy And Bess (Liberty Music Shops 78 rpm album, 1942) Cy Walter plays three solo songs; Mabel Mercer sings three songs accompanied by Cy. Album reissued twice by AEI, as Cabin In The Sky/Porgy And Bess (AEI 1107, 1979 LP) and as Cabin In The Sky/Porgy And Bess/Carib Song (AEI-CD-17, 1995 CD). On the CD, Cy's three solos are combined into a Porgy And Bess "Medley".
- By Request (Request Records SW 107-112, early 40s)
- Cy Walter at The Drake Room Piano (Apollo A-14, 1948)
- Piano Moods (Columbia CL 6161, 1951)
- Holiday for Keys (Columbia CL 6202, 1952)
- Rodgers Revisited (Atlantic 1236, 1956 LP; Collectables COLS 6915, 2008 CD)
- Cy Walter Plays Gershwin Classics (Atlantic 8016, 1957)
- Hits from the Great Astaire-Rogers Films (RCA Camden CAL-533, 1959)
- A Dry Martini Please! (Westminster WP-6120)
- Cy Walter at The Drake (MGM E/SE-4393, 1966)
- Sublimities, Volume 1 (Harbinger HCD 3103, 2015) Piano solos, rare recordings, radio appearances

=== Duo ===
- Piano Playhouse - with Stan Freeman (MGM E-514, 1950)
- Manhattan - with Stan Freeman (Epic LG 1001, 1955)
- Sublimities, Volume 2 (Harbinger HCD 3104, 2015) Multiple piano performances, work as accompanist, song compositions

=== As accompanist ===
- Mabel Mercer Sings, Cy Walter Plays, Selections From George Gershwin's Porgy And Bess (Liberty Music Shops 78 rpm album, 1942) Mabel Mercer sings three songs accompanied by Cy Walter; Cy plays three solo songs. Album reissued twice by AEI, as Cabin In The Sky/Porgy And Bess (AEI 1107, 1979 LP) and as Cabin In The Sky/Porgy And Bess/Carib Song (AEI-CD-17, 1995 CD).
- Songs By Mabel Mercer, Volume II - with Stan Freeman (Atlantic ALS 403); tracks reissued on The Art of Mabel Mercer (Atlantic 2-602, 1965 LP; Rhino/Atlantic COL-CD-6838, 2001 CD)
- Mabel Mercer Sings Cole Porter - with Stan Freeman (Atlantic 1213, LP; Rhino/Atlantic R2 71690, 1994 CD)
- Songs By Greta Keller (Liberty Music Shops)
- Greta Keller Sings Kurt Weill (Atlantic ALS 405)
- Night in Manhattan - Lee Wiley with Stan Freeman, Bobby Hackett, Joe Bushkin (Columbia CL 656, 1951; Sony Special Products WK 75010, CD; Collector's Choice 204, 2001 CD)
- Lee Wiley Sings Vincent Youmans - with Stan Freeman (Columbia CL 6215, 1952; Columbia 2OAP-1496; Collector's Choice 204, 2001 CD)
- Lee Wiley Sings Irving Berlin - with Stan Freeman (Columbia CL 6216, 1952; Columbia 2OAP-1496; Collector's Choice 204, 2001 CD)
