= Roseland-State Ballroom =

Swing-era ballroom in Boston, MA

Roseland-State Ballroom was once a swing-era ballroom in Boston, MA that operated between 1937 to 1958. The ballroom was located down the street from Berklee's Boston campus. Jazz musicians including Duke Ellington, Count Basie, Jimmy Lunceford, Artie Shaw & Billie Holiday, Cab Calloway, Charlie Barnet and Sam Donahue played there in the 1930s and 1940s. Artie Shaw's band (including Billie Holiday) built their reputation playing Tuesdays and Saturday nights there in 1938.

== History ==
For some of the 1930s, the Roseland-State was two ballrooms—the State and the Roseland—but around 1937, Charlie and Cy (Simon) Shribman assumed control and removed the wall in between the two ballrooms. They owned and operated the ballroom during its heyday in the swing era. The Roseland-State Ballroom and its proprietors had a significant impact on many now prominent jazz musicians. Duke Ellington had credited Charlie and Cy Shribman as significant influences in his career as they would promote his shows during a time period where many others would not. When Glenn Miller faced financial troubles in 1938, his new band was underwritten by Cy Shribman ultimately leading to Miller's commercial success in 1939.

Malcolm X worked at the Roseland-State Ballroom as a shoeshiner in his youth and described lindy hop being danced there:

"Showtime!" people would start hollering about the last hour of dance. Then a couple of dozen really wild couples would stay on the floor, the girls changing to low white sneakers. The band now would really be blasting, and all the other dancers would form a clapping, shouting circle to watch that wild competition as it began, covering only a quarter or so of the ballroom floor. The band, the spectators and the dancers would be making the Roseland Ballroom feel like a big, rocking ship. The spotlight would be turning, pink, yellow, green, and blue, picking up the couples lindy-hopping as if they had gone mad. "Wail, man, wail!" people would be shouting at the band; and it would be wailing, until first one and then another couple just ran out of strength and stumbled off toward the crowd, exhausted and soaked with sweat.

During that era, the Roseland-State was also host to other types of popular dances & musics of the time, such as waltzes and polkas.

During Malcolm X's time working at the Roseland-State, it was a segregated venue, with some nights for black audiences and other nights for white audiences.

In the 1950's, a sharp decline in attendance began as big band was on its way out. In 1958, Charlie Shribman sold the ballroom to William Fuller, and it was renamed the New State Ballroom. After that, it become home to mostly Irish and old time music.

On January 26, 1968, a Friday night, the "Last Waltz" was held which marked the official closing. The following day on January 27, 1968 the State Ballroom held its last night of public ballroom and officially closed. The building that once housed the Roseland-State ballroom and the State Ballroom was demolished later that year.
