= Derek Ansell =

British novelist and biographer (1934–2024)

Derek Ansell (13 August 1934 – 13 December 2024) was a British novelist and biographer.

== Life and career ==
Ansell worked as a regular contributor to Jazz Journal and Newbury Weekly News, Ansell's first novel. The Whitechapel Murders, was published by Citron Press in 1999. In 2008, he published the first biography of saxophonist Hank Mobley.

His novel, A Safe Place To Stay, a novel set during WWII, was published in 2018.

Ansell had three daughters and five grandchildren. He died in Newbury, Berkshire, on 13 December 2024, at the age of 90.

== Publications ==
- 2008: Workout: The Music of Hank Mobley ISBN 978 09550908-8-2 Northway Publications, London.
- 2012: Sugar Free Saxophone: The Life and Music of Jackie McLean Northway Publications, London
- 2013: My Brother's Keeper: novel published by Chiado Publishing, Portugal & worldwide.
- 2014: Sex & Sensibility: novel published by Dark Hollows Press USA.

The Bradgate Heiress published by Creativia Publishing in 2018 is a fictional account of the life of Lady Jane Grey in Tudor times.
