= Richard Kollmar =

American actor (1910–1971)

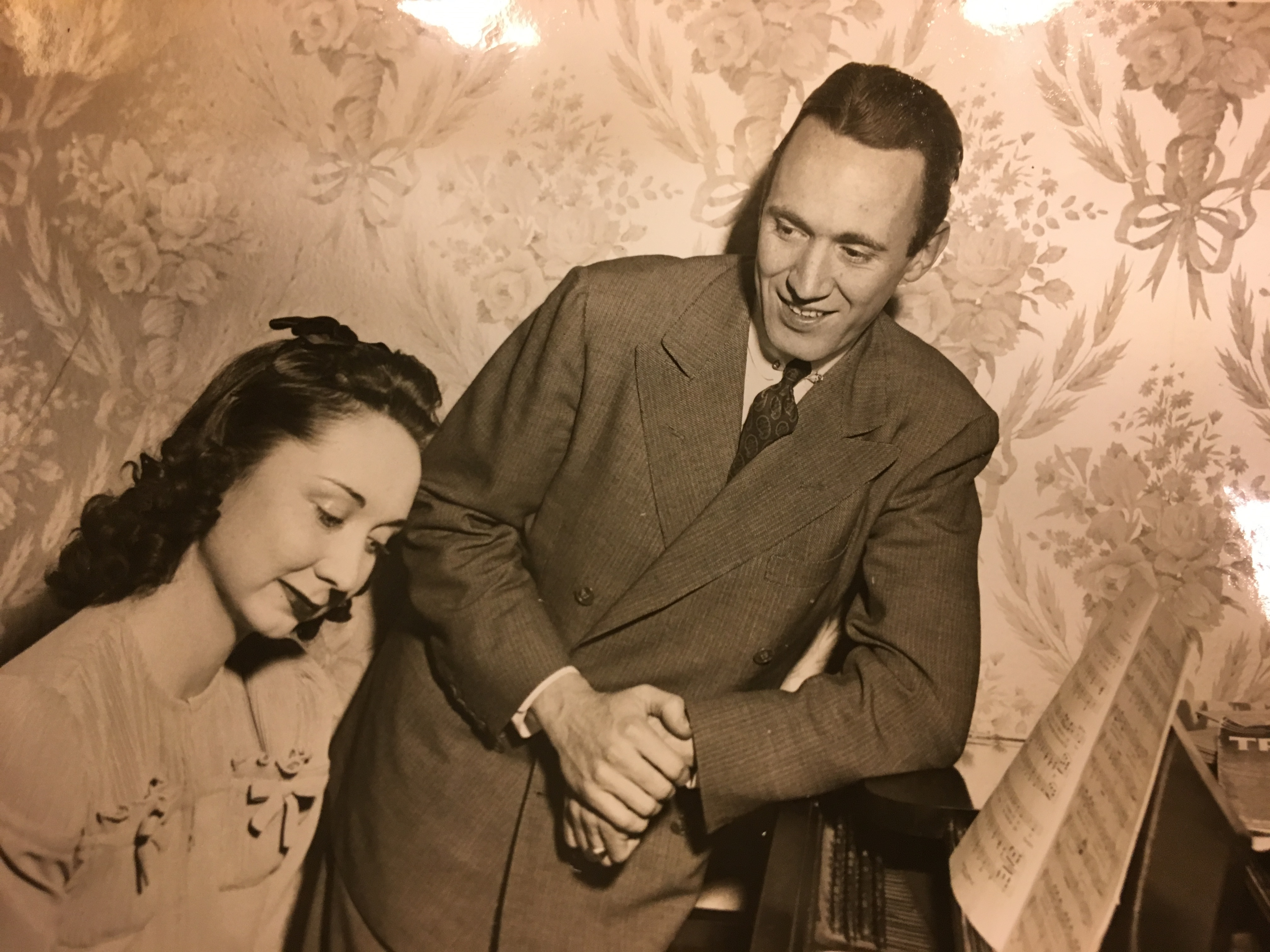
- Born: Richard Tompkins Kollmar; December 31, 1910
- Died: January 7, 1971 (aged 60); New York City, U.S.
- Education: Tusculum College; Yale School of Drama
- Occupations: Actor; television personality; stage producer; director
- Spouses: Dorothy Kilgallen (m. 1940; died 1965) Anne Fogarty (m. 1967)
- Children: 3

Richard Tompkins Kollmar (December 31, 1910 – January 7, 1971) was an American stage, radio, film and television actor, television personality and Broadway producer. Kollmar was the husband of journalist Dorothy Kilgallen.

== Early life ==
Kollmar was born to Mr. and Mrs. John Kollmar. His great-great-grandfather was Daniel D. Tompkins, the fourth governor of New York and the sixth vice president of the United States. When Kollmar was an infant, the family moved to Ridgewood, New Jersey, where his father worked as an architect. Kollmar attended Tusculum College, where he became interested in acting, and he performed in the school's glee club and was the editor of the school newspaper. Upon graduation, he enrolled at the Yale School of Drama but dropped out after winning a role on a radio drama.

== Career ==
After moving to New York City and procuring steady work on radio commercials, Kollmar appeared in the Broadway plays Knickerbocker Holiday (1938) and Too Many Girls (1939). Kollmar, along with Cy Walter and Jimmy Dobson, composed the song I'll Never Tire of You. It was performed by the Sam Donahue Orchestra on November 12, 1941, during a recording session at Bluebird Records.

After becoming a Broadway producer, Kollmar hired Fats Waller to compose the 1943 musical Early to Bed. This episode in Kollmar's career was recalled in a 2016 essay about Waller by John McWhorter, an American academic and linguist who is associate professor of English and Comparative Literature at Columbia University.

Even as late as 1943, the idea of a black composer writing the score for a standard-issue white show was unheard of. When Broadway performer and producer Richard Kollmar began planning Early to Bed, his original idea was for Waller to perform in it as a comic character, not to write the music. Waller was, after all, as much a comedian as a musician. ... Kollmar's original choice for composer [of Early to Bed] was Ferde Grofé, best known as the orchestrator of George Gershwin's "Rhapsody in Blue," whose signature compositions were portentous concert suites. But Grofé withdrew, and it is to Kollmar's credit that he realized that he had a top-rate pop-song composer available in Waller. Waller's double duty as composer and performer was short-lived. During a cash crisis and in an advanced state of intoxication, Waller threatened to leave the production unless Kollmar bought the rights to his Early to Bed music for $1,000. (This was typical of Waller, who often sold melodies for quick cash when in his cups. The evidence suggests, for example, that the standards "I Can't Give You Anything but Love" and "On the Sunny Side of the Street" were Waller tunes.) Waller came to his senses the next day, but Kollmar decided that his drinking habits made him too risky a proposition for eight performances a week. From then on, Waller was the show's composer only, with lyrics by George Marion.

In the early 1940s, Kollmar portrayed the role of Dennis Pierce on the radio series Pretty Kitty Kelly on CBS Radio. From 1945 to 1949, Kollmar portrayed Boston Blackie on the radio program of the same name, a Ziv-produced syndicated series which mostly ran on Mutual Broadcasting System stations. He also had lead roles in other radio shows including Gang Busters, Grand Central Station and the soap opera Bright Horizon.

In April 1945, Kollmar and his newspaper-columnist wife Dorothy Kilgallen (whom he had married in April 1940) began hosting a 45-minute talk radio show called Breakfast with Dorothy and Dick. The program aired Monday through Friday on WOR and was broadcast live from the couple's 16-room Park Avenue apartment. Over breakfast, served by their butler Julius, Kollmar and Kilgallen talked about New York City entertainment, sports, celebrity gossip and the city's nightclub scene. Their two children, Richard, Jr. ("Dickie") and Jill, often made appearances. Breakfast with Dorothy and Dick was broadcast locally throughout New York City and its suburbs, drawing an audience of 20 million listeners. In January 1953, the Kollmar family moved from their Park Avenue apartment to a five-story townhouse on Manhattan's East 68th Street, and their radio series began originating from there. Breakfast with Dorothy and Dick ceased production on March 21, 1963.

In 1948, Kollmar made his first and only film appearance in the low-budget crime drama Close-Up, directed by Jack Donohue. He played the supporting role of a Nazi war criminal who lived in hiding in the United States. In June 1949, Kollmar began hosting the live television variety series Broadway Spotlight. The series, which aired on NBC, was canceled on September 4, 1949. Throughout the early to mid-1950s, Kollmar continued his career as an actor with guest roles on television.

In 1952, Kollmar became the master of ceremonies for the DuMont Television Network game show Guess What?, which aired from July 8, 1952, to August 26, 1952, though no kinescopes of the show exist.

From 1952 to 1965, Kollmar made five appearances on the game show What's My Line?, on which his wife was a regular panelist. Kollmar appeared once as an occupational guest, twice as part of a group of mystery guests and twice as a panelist. His appearance as a panelist on July 6, 1952, has been lost; the mystery guest on the lost episode was actor Dane Clark.

In addition to his work in radio and television, Kollmar produced and directed several Broadway stage musicals. Early to Bed ran from June 17, 1943, to May 13, 1944. Kollmar produced and directed the fantasy musical Dream with Music that premiered on May 19, 1944. The cast included ballerina Vera Zorina. The story was written by Kollmar's wife Dorothy, Sidney Sheldon and Ben Roberts. Dream with Music was praised for its ballet sequences, but critics' reviews were otherwise negative. It closed after 28 performances. Kollmar fared better with other Broadway productions including the hits By Jupiter, Are You With It? and Plain and Fancy. Plain and Fancy ran on Broadway from January 27, 1955, to March 3, 1956.

In 1958, Kollmar produced The Body Beautiful, a musical about prize fighters starring Steve Forrest, singers Lonnie Sattin and Barbara McNair (in their Broadway debuts), Mindy Carson and Jack Warden. He hired two newcomers, lyricist Sheldon Harnick and composer Jerry Bock, a team who would later write the lyrics and music for the hit shows Fiddler on the Roof and Fiorello!. Upon its debut on January 23, 1958, critics' reviews of The Body Beautiful were generally mixed. However, more influential critics panned the show and the music (though two songs, "All of These and More" and "Summer Is," became standards). The New Yorker called the show "vulgar and feeble minded in equal degrees." The Body Beautiful failed to attract an audience and closed in March 1958 after 60 performances. It was the last show that Kollmar would produce.

When not busy with acting and producing, Kollmar sold inexpensive artwork and operated supper clubs. His most successful club was called The Left Bank, located at 309 West 50th Street in Manhattan. It closed permanently before the 1965 death of Kollmar's first wife Dorothy Kilgallen.

Kollmar was involved in the field of fine art, working with the Art Students League of New York and operating galleries during two different phases of his career. In 1952, his gallery called "The Little Studio" opened and was publicized several times by the New York Journal-American where his wife Dorothy Kilgallen was employed. The Little Studio charged less than a hundred dollars for each item. Its location changed a few times, but it was very successful. A book about Kilgallen and Kollmar says, "Lee Nordness, a cultured, beautiful young man with a master's degree in Fine Arts whom Richard [Kollmar] considered a social equal and who eventually bought the studio from him, had no respect for his taste or his business acumen." The approximate time frame of Nordness' purchase of The Little Studio from Kollmar is unknown. (According to Nordness' New York Times obituary decades later, in 1958 he "founded the Nordness gallery on Madison Avenue in Manhattan, where he specialized in the works of contemporary American painters and sculptors." The obituary makes no mention of Kollmar or The Little Studio.)

In the last months of Kilgallen's life, Kollmar did not have a nightclub or art gallery, was unemployed and his living expenses were paid entirely by her. Kilgallen died on November 8, 1965, and a year and a few months later, Kollmar opened an art gallery called "the Pastiche" on East 53rd Street in midtown Manhattan. The Sunday edition of the New York Daily News gave it prominent attention, including photos of Kollmar posing with artwork, on February 12, 1967. Kollmar knew about Pop art but refused to display any of it, explaining, "I have a theory that the only honest and pure abstract art is by children between the ages of 3 and 6."

== Personal life ==
Kollmar was married twice and had two children. On April 6, 1940, he married Dorothy Kilgallen at St. Vincent Ferrer Church in Manhattan. The couple had two children: Richard, Jr. (born 1941) and Jill (born 1943). A third child, Kerry (born 1954), was suspected by some to be the son of Kilgallen and the singer Johnnie Ray, conceived during an extramarital affair. Kilgallen achieved more fame and recognition in her multiple careers than her husband achieved in his, and many who socialized with the couple gravitated toward her high intelligence. This took a heavy emotional toll on Kollmar, but they remained married until her death in November 1965. Those who attended her funeral included fashion designer Anne Fogarty, whom Kollmar married in June 1967. They remained married until his death.

In 1967 and early 1968, Kollmar, Fogarty and young Kerry lived in a penthouse on Manhattan's East 72nd Street, with Kollmar commuting to and from his East 53rd Street art gallery called "the Pastiche." In the spring of 1968, Kollmar and Fogarty purchased the same East 68th Street townhouse where he had lived with his first wife, Dorothy Kilgallen, and Kerry. The couple made renovations that included tearing down walls, rebuilding hallways and setting up a studio for Fogarty to design clothes. They leased the ground floor to two ophthalmologists, who opened a practice there. How long Kollmar's art gallery "the Pastiche" lasted is unknown. In 1969 or 1970, Richard Kollmar disowned Kerry, who was then age 15 or 16. Kerry lived with friends and in foster homes until he became a legal adult, by which time Richard was dead.

== Death ==
On January 7, 1971, Kollmar died at the Manhattan townhouse where he lived with his second wife, Anne Fogarty. Newspaper reports stated that he "... died in his sleep late Thursday [January 7] in his New York home." According to his friends, Kollmar had broken his shoulder while falling at home three days before his death. This obituary also said the Pastiche had expired some months before his death.

His funeral was held on January 9 at St. Vincent Ferrer Church in Manhattan, where he had married his first wife in 1940.

== Broadway credits ==
Date	Production	Role	Notes
October 19, 1938 – March 11, 1939	Knickerbocker Holiday	Brom Broeck	
October 18, 1939 – May 18, 1940	Too Many Girls	Clint Kelley	
January 14 – January 18, 1941	Crazy With the Heat	Performer	
June 3 – June 12, 1943	By Jupiter	–	Producer
June 17, 1943 – May 13, 1944	Early to Bed	El Magnifico	Producer
May 18 – June 10, 1944	Dream With Music	–	Producer, director
November 10, 1945 – June 29, 1946	Are You with It?	–	Producer
January 27, 1955 – March 3, 1956	Plain and Fancy	–	Producer
January 23 – March 15, 1958	The Body Beautiful	–	Producer

== Filmography ==
Year	Title	Role	Notes
1948	Close-Up	Martin Beaumont	
1949	Broadway Spotlight	Host	Unknown episodes
1950	The Web		Episode: "The Witness"
1951	Penthouse Party	Himself	Episode #1.29
1952	Guess What?	Host	Unknown episodes Credited as Dick Kollmar
1952-1965	What's My Line	Himself/panelist	5 episodes
1954	Armstrong Circle Theatre		Episode: "Evening Star"
1954	Who's the Boss?	Himself/Panelist	Unknown episodes Credited as Dick Kollmar
1956	Person to Person	Himself	Episode #3.21
1956	NBC Matinee Theater	–	Episode: "Pygmalion Jones"; Writer
