= St. Vincent Ferrer High School =

Catholic high school in New York City

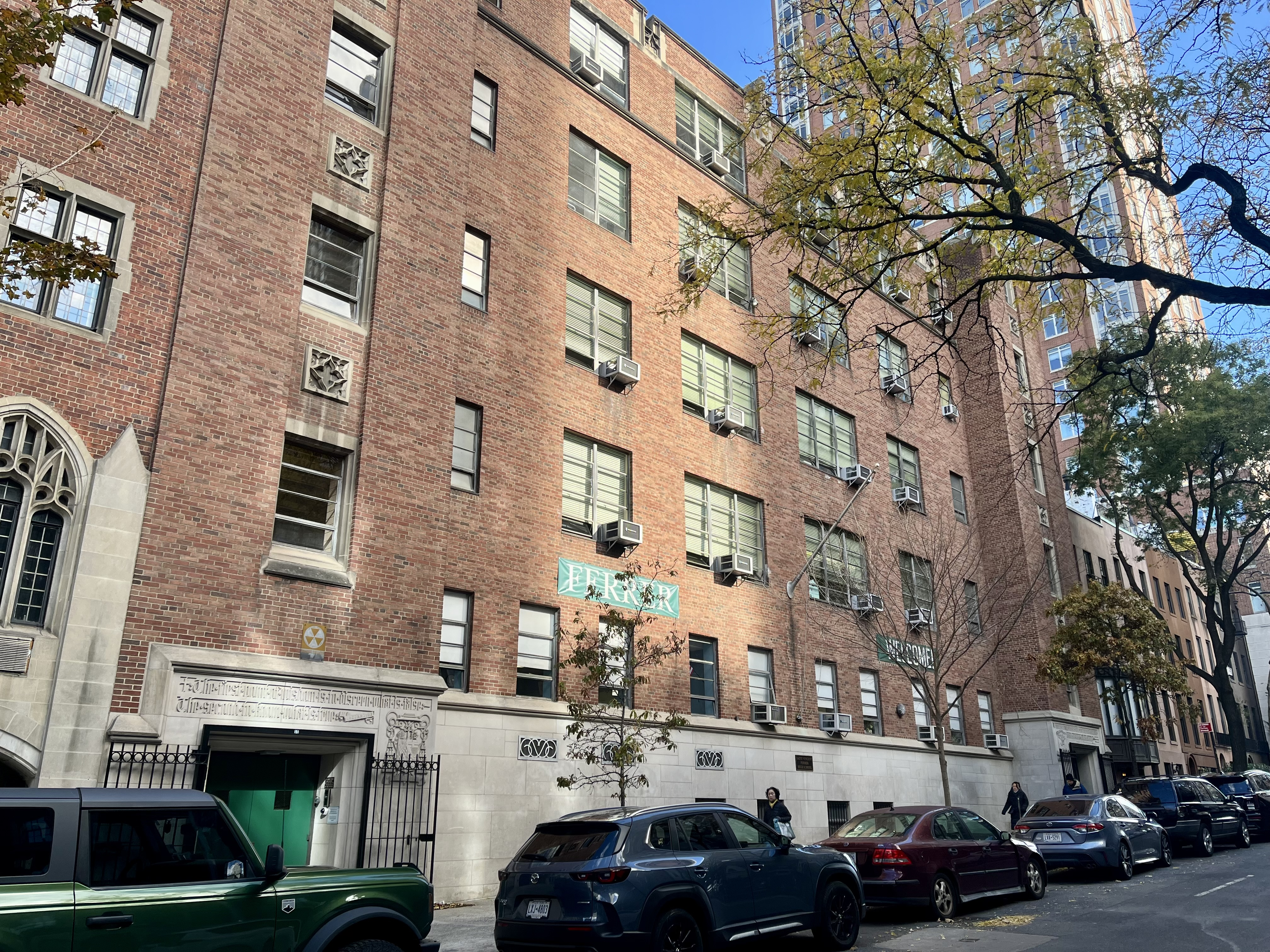
- The school in 2025

Location
- 151 East 65th Street (Upper East Side, Manhattan); Upper East Side, Manhattan; New York City, New York 10065; United States; 40°45′57″N 73°57′53″W

Information
- Type: Private, all-female
- Motto: "Veritas" (Truth)
- Religious affiliation: Catholic
- Patron saints: Saint Vincent Ferrer and Catherine of Sienna
- Established: 1884 (142 years ago)
- Principal: Sr. Martha Kunesh, OP
- Faculty: 32 (as of November 2022)
- Grades: 9–12
- Gender: Girls
- Average class size: 12:1
- Campus: Urban
- Colors: Green and white
- Slogan: "Falcons Fly Higher"
- Athletics: Basketball, cheerleading, lacrosse, soccer, softball, volleyball, track, cross-country, dance
- Mascot: Falcon
- Nickname: Ferrer
- Team name: Falcons
- Rival: Dominican Academy, Notre Dame School, St. Jean Baptiste High School
- Accreditation: Middle States Association of Colleges and Schools
- Newspaper: The Trumpet
- School fees: $1,000 (registration) $700 (book fee)
- Tuition: $12,300 (as of 2026)
- Affiliation: Dominican Sisters of Our Lady of the Springs
- Admissions Director: Sr. Christine Cosgrove, OP
- Athletic Director: Gina Loayza-Marcelo
- Website: saintvincentferrer.com

St. Vincent Ferrer High School is an independent, college-preparatory Roman Catholic high school for girls located on the Upper East Side of the Manhattan, in New York City, New York.

Named for Saint Vincent Ferrer, it was founded by the Dominican fathers in 1884. The school is sponsored by the parish of Saint Vincent Ferrer and is located within the Roman Catholic Archdiocese of New York. The Dominican Sisters of Saint Mary of Springs (now The Dominican Sisters of Our Lady of the Springs of Bridgeport) teach and administer the school.

== History ==
The school was founded in 1884 by the Dominican fathers of the Church of Saint Vincent Ferrer to meet the growing immigrant population. It was originally a co-educational elementary school, with the high school being added in 1909. The present school building was erected in 1954, the same year it became an all-girls college-preparatory high school. The grammar school closed in 1985, and twelve years later the Advisory Board was created. The school was accredited by Middle States Association in 2002, two years after the Scholars Program was inaugurated.

== Academics ==
Ferrer offers courses in the categories of Math, English, Social Studies, Religion, Fine Arts, and Language. Both modern and classical languages are taught at the school. In addition, the school offers 7 Advanced Placement courses, the Pre-Med College Advantage Program, and a Math and Science Academy for 7th grade girls.

Saint Vincent Ferrer High School is one of the few select high schools in New York City which participates in the College Advantage Program of St. John's University. Seniors and Juniors are able to earn up to 18 college credits in while attending college-level classes at Ferrer during the regular school day with their regular Ferrer faculty, who have been approved by St. John's as adjunct professors.

== Demographics ==
As of 2022-23, the school had an enrollment of 401 students. There were 32 teachers for a student-teacher ratio of 12:1.

The school's student body was 52.4% White, 26.2% Hispanic, 8.7% Asian, 7.5% Black, and 3.7% two or more races.

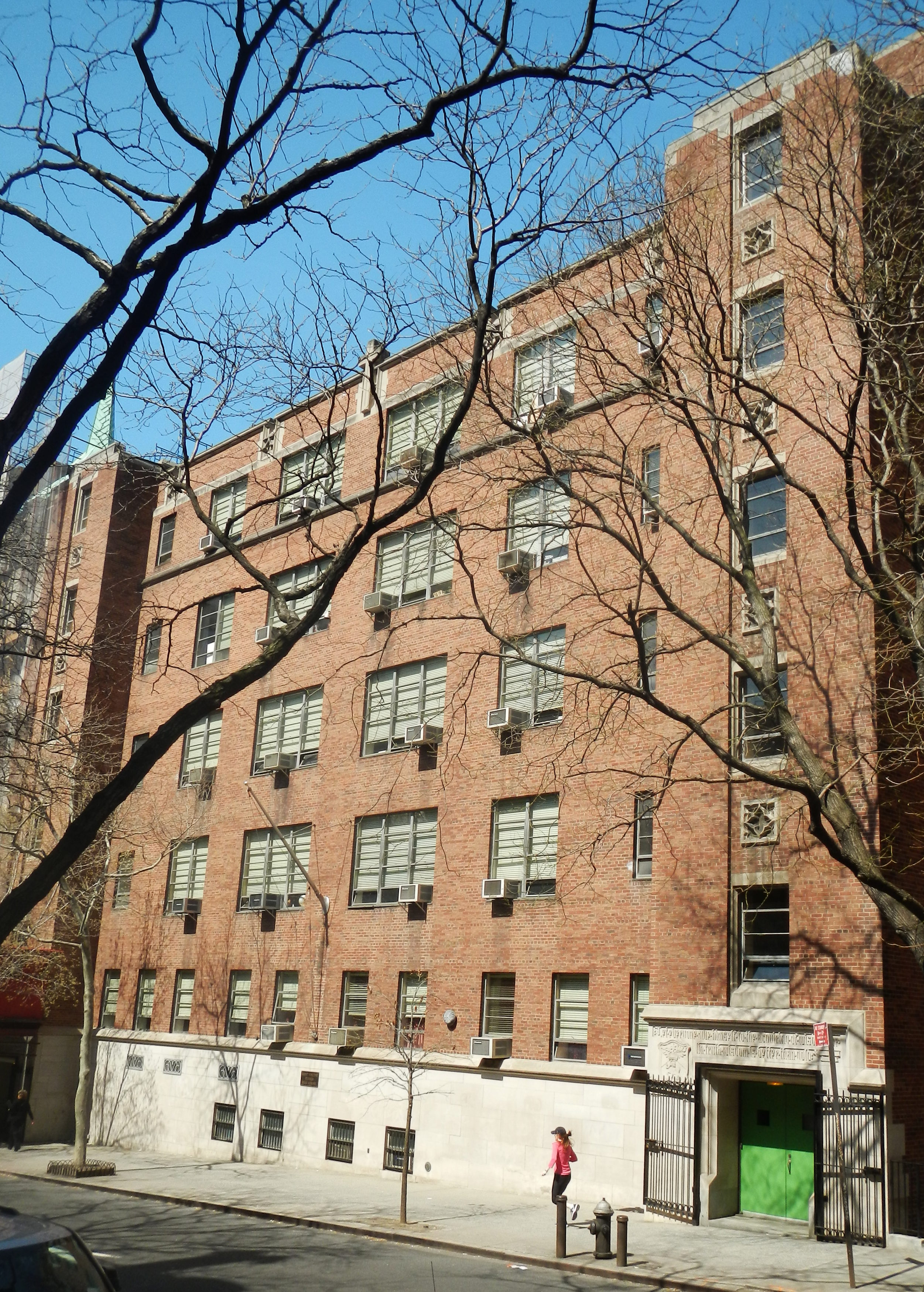
