= Marriage on the Rocks =

1965 film by Jack Donohue

- Theatrical release poster
- Directed by: Jack Donohue
- Written by: Cy Howard
- Produced by: William H. Daniels
- Starring: Frank Sinatra; Deborah Kerr; Dean Martin; Nancy Sinatra; Joi Lansing
- Cinematography: William H. Daniels
- Edited by: Sam O'Steen
- Music by: Nelson Riddle
- Production companies: A-C Productions; Sinatra Enterprises
- Distributed by: Warner Bros. Pictures
- Release date: September 24, 1965
- Running time: 109 minutes
- Country: United States
- Language: English
- Box office: $3,000,000 (US/ Canada rentals)

Marriage on the Rocks is a 1965 comedy film starring Frank Sinatra, Deborah Kerr, and Dean Martin about a businessman's wife who ends up divorced by mistake and then married to his best friend by an even bigger mistake. The film was written by Cy Howard and directed by Jack Donohue.

The picture would be the last feature film partnership of Sinatra and Martin for nearly 20 years, when they appeared together briefly in 1984's Cannonball Run II.

== Plot ==
After nineteen years of marriage, workaholic Dan Edwards's wife Valerie is frustrated. Rather than tending to her needs at home, Dan spends most of his time at an ad agency he runs with old friend, Ernie Brewer, a laid-back bachelor and Dan's second-in-command. Once a real swinger, Dan has become a bore to his whole family. By contrast, the kids look up to the exciting "Uncle Ernie", who is always there to give advice. Valerie likes it that Ernie does things her husband won't – dances with her, compliments her, even picks out the gifts Dan buys for her. At one point, Val becomes so impatient she seeks a lawyer's advice concerning divorce. Back at the office, Ernie can see what his best friend is blind to, so he urges Dan to take his wife on a second honeymoon to Mexico.

Once there, in a land of quickie marriages and divorces, Dan and Val get into an argument in front of proprietor Miguel Santos, and, before they know it, they're divorced. But an apologetic Dan makes it up to her and arranges for them to be remarried right away. However, an urgent business matter requires his presence back home to save his company's biggest account. Valerie stays in Mexico to await Dan's return. But the business matter is extended and Ernie has to travel to Mexico to explain everything to Val, unaware that she's already put the wedding ceremony in motion. By mistake, she ends up married to Ernie.

Once over the shock, Ernie anticipates a quickie divorce, but Val thinks she might enjoy the new arrangement. Dan, fed up with both of them, decides he's not exactly broken-hearted either. He re-discovers the joys of bachelorhood, cavorting with Ernie's sexy playmates. Val goes to the doctor to discover that she is pregnant with Dan's baby. She plans on telling him the news when she discovers that Dan has a twenty-three year old girlfriend.

As for poor Ernie, it's now up to him to run the business, which turns him into the same dull, inattentive husband that her first spouse had been. Ernie is no longer that fun loving single bachelor but rather a married man. Val eventually tells Dan that they have three children. In the end, however, everything is put right.

== Cast ==
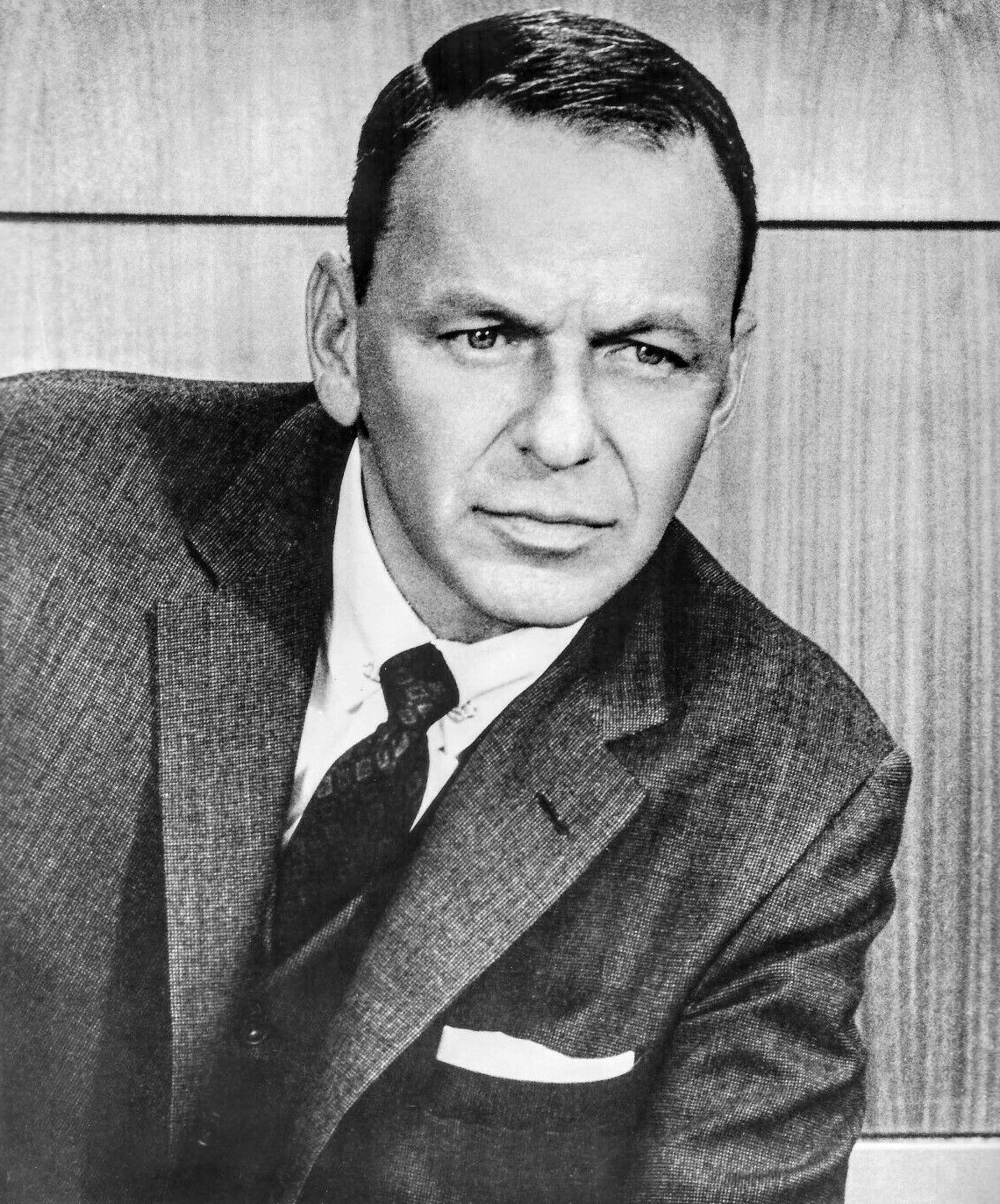
Publicity photo of Frank Sinatra in Marriage on the Rocks

- Frank Sinatra as Dan Edwards
- Deborah Kerr as Valerie Edwards
- Dean Martin as Ernie Brewer
- Cesar Romero as Miguel Santos
- Hermione Baddeley as Jeannie MacPherson
- Tony Bill as Jim Blake
- John McGiver as Shad Nathan
- Nancy Sinatra as Tracy Edwards
- Davey Davison as Lisa Sterling
- Michel Petit as David Edwards
- Joi Lansing as Lola
- Tara Ashton (aka Darlene Lucht) as Bunny
- Kathleen Freeman as Miss Blight
- Flip Mark as Rollo
- DeForest Kelley as Mr. Turner
- Sigrid Valdis as Kitty
- Trini Lopez as himself

== Production ==
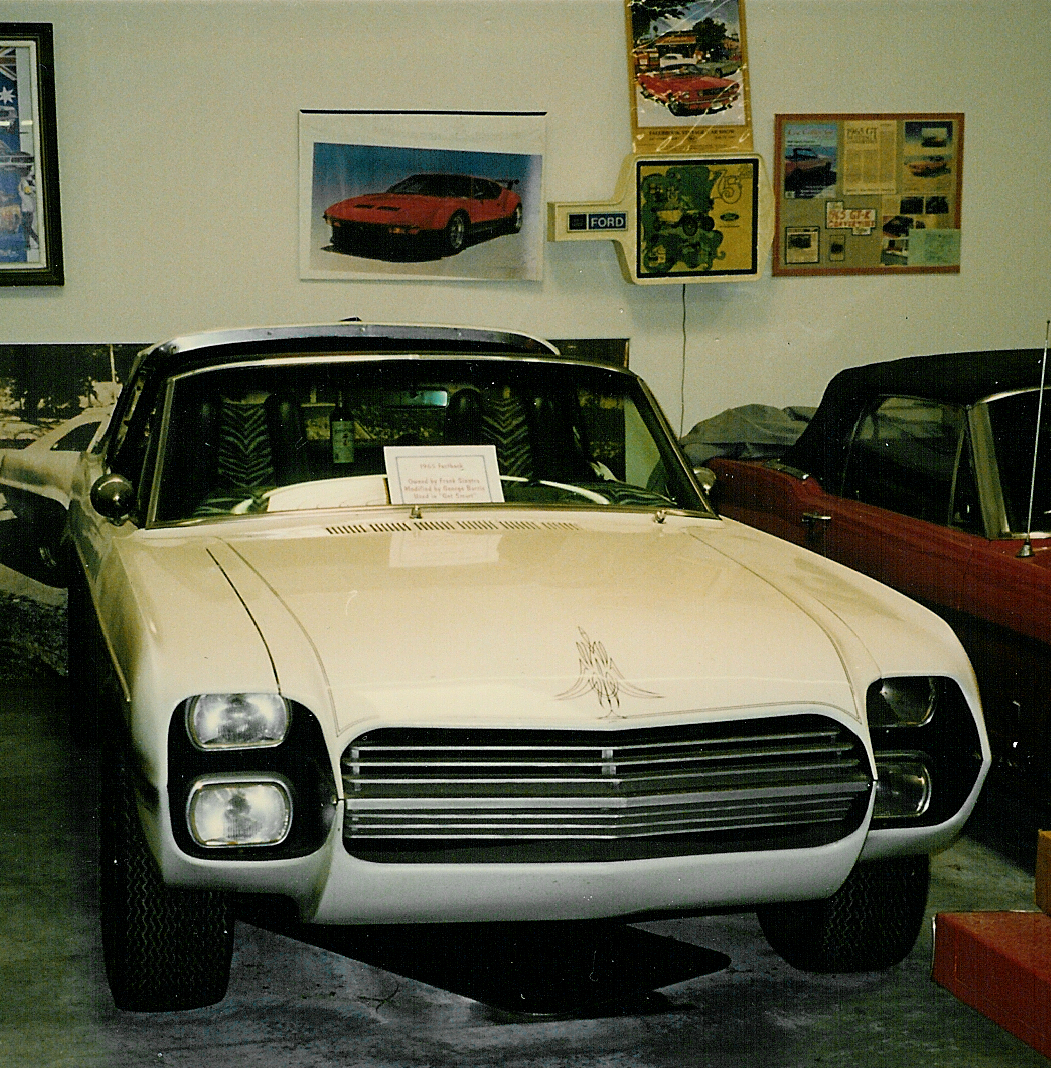
65 Mustang customised by George Barris

The film originally began under the title of Divorce American Style with Frank Sinatra personally selecting Deborah Kerr for the role of his wife. Cy Howard's original screenplay was deemed offensive and rewritten under the title Community Property over a period of four months, then given its final title. After a preview, Warner Bros. Pictures cut out 14 minutes before its release to underwhelming reviews in September 1965. Nancy Sinatra was a last minute replacement for Mia Farrow. The new title proved apt as during the filming Nancy Sinatra broke up with her husband Tommy Sands.

The Mexican Government was offended by the film's depiction of Mexico and banned the film and other Sinatra films for what they regarded as a derogatory depiction of the nation.

Shots of Dean Martin's actual house appeared in the film as did a Ford Mustang and a Ford Thunderbird customised by George Barris.
