= Anne Fogarty =

American fashion designer (1919–1980)

- Anne Fogarty wearing one of her own dresses, on the first edition of her book Wife Dressing (1959)
- Born: Anne Whitney; February 2, 1919; Pittsburgh, Pennsylvania, U.S.
- Died: January 15, 1980 (aged 60); New York City, U.S.
- Education: Allegheny College, Carnegie Institute of Technology, East Hartman School of Design
- Label: Anne Fogarty
- Spouses: Tom Fogarty (m. 1940, divorced) Richard Kollmar (m. 1967; died 1971) Wade O'Hara (m. 1977, divorced)
- Children: 2
- Awards: Neiman Marcus Fashion Award, Coty Award

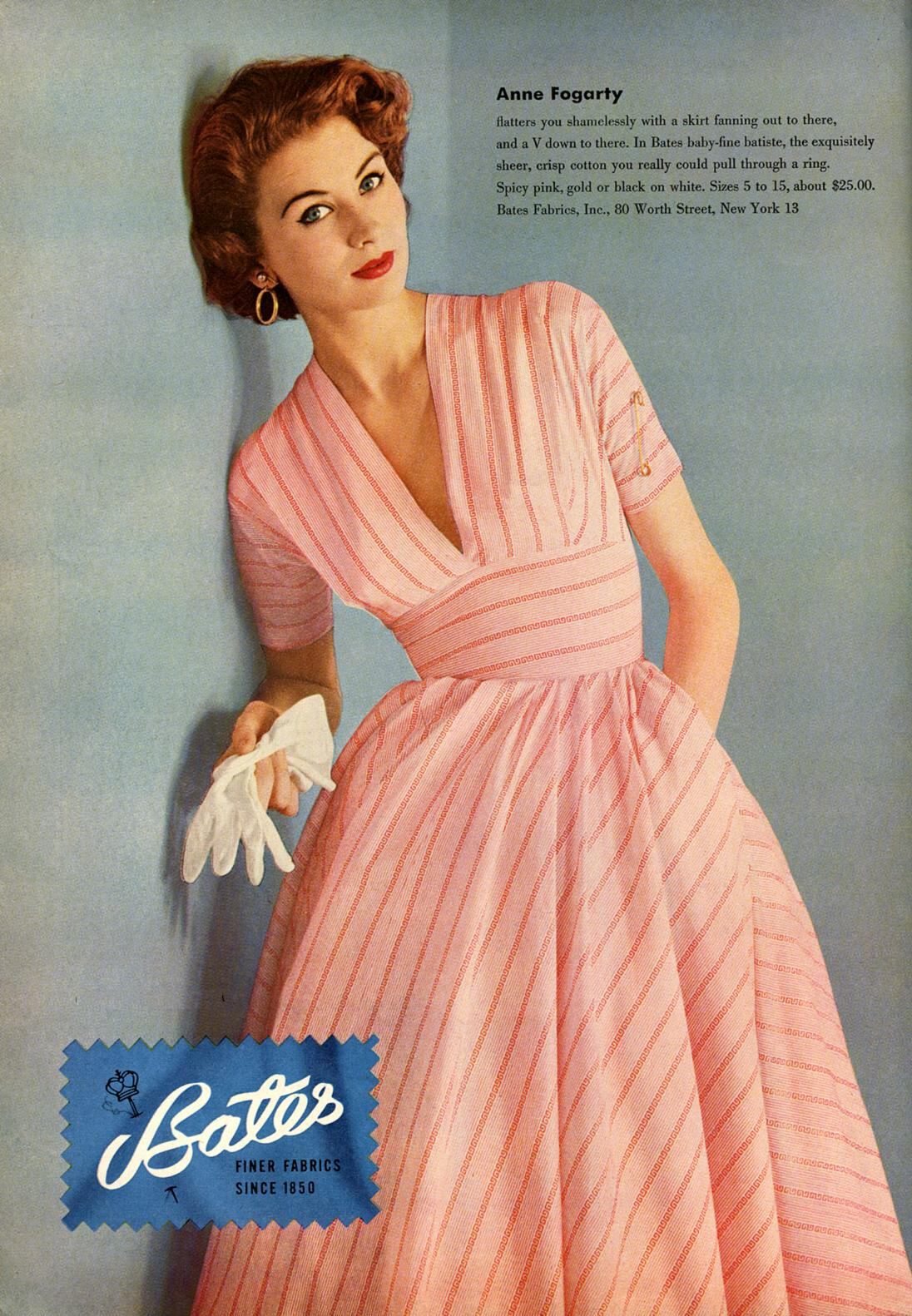
Suzy Parker wearing Anne Fogarty, 1952

Anne Fogarty (February 2, 1919 – January 15, 1980) was an American fashion designer, active 1940–1980, who was noted for her understated, ladylike designs that were accessible to American women on a limited income. She started out as a model in New York in 1939, working for Harvey Berin on Seventh Avenue, before studying fashion design. She eventually secured a full-time design job in 1948, and became well known for full-skirted designs with fitted bodices, inspired by Dior's New Look.

Fogarty's clothes were easy to wear, practical, and made with casual fabrics, following the American sportswear tradition. She ran her own label from 1962 to 1974, and worked as a freelance designer until her death. In 1959, Fogarty published a style manual, Wife Dressing: The Fine Art of Being a Well-Dressed Wife, which emphasized femininity, neatness, and always being suitably dressed as desirable qualities. Wife Dressing was rediscovered in the early 21st century, and has become a key resource for designers and fashion historians looking to explore the 1950s ideology of ultra-feminine dressing.

== Early life ==
Anne Fogarty was born in 1919 in Pittsburgh, Pennsylvania, to Robert and Marion Whitney, who had immigrated in 1909 from Cape Town as part of a large Lithuanian Jewish community in South Africa who had apparently changed their names from Robert and Henrietta Gruskin, at the time of their immigration in 1908. Her eldest sister, Lillian, would become better known as the food writer Poppy Cannon (who was married to the head of the National Association for the Advancement of Colored People, Walter F. White), and Fogarty and Canon also had a sister and a brother born between the dates of their births. Anne wore clothes handed down from her older sisters' cast-off clothing, which she remodeled to suit herself. She graduated from high school and entered Allegheny College in 1936. The following year, she transferred to the Carnegie Institute of Technology (now part of Carnegie Mellon University) to study drama, as she wanted to be an actress. In 1939, after Poppy moved to New York City, Anne decided to follow her there. While looking for acting work, she became a model for Harvey Berin, a Seventh Avenue-based womenswear manufacturer. Berin recognized Anne's talent after seeing her responses to the clothes that his designers made using her as a model, and offered to subsidize her training to be a fashion designer. Anne went to the East Hartman School of Design, although she paid her own way.

After Harvey Berin, Anne worked as a model and designer for the Sheila Lynn company. In 1940, she married the artist Thomas E. Fogarty. Although the marriage eventually ended in divorce, Anne retained his surname professionally. She modeled and worked as a stylist and publicist, including styling Rolls-Royce advertisements, until, in 1948, she secured a design job for Youth Guild, a new company that specialized in teenage fashion.

== Career ==
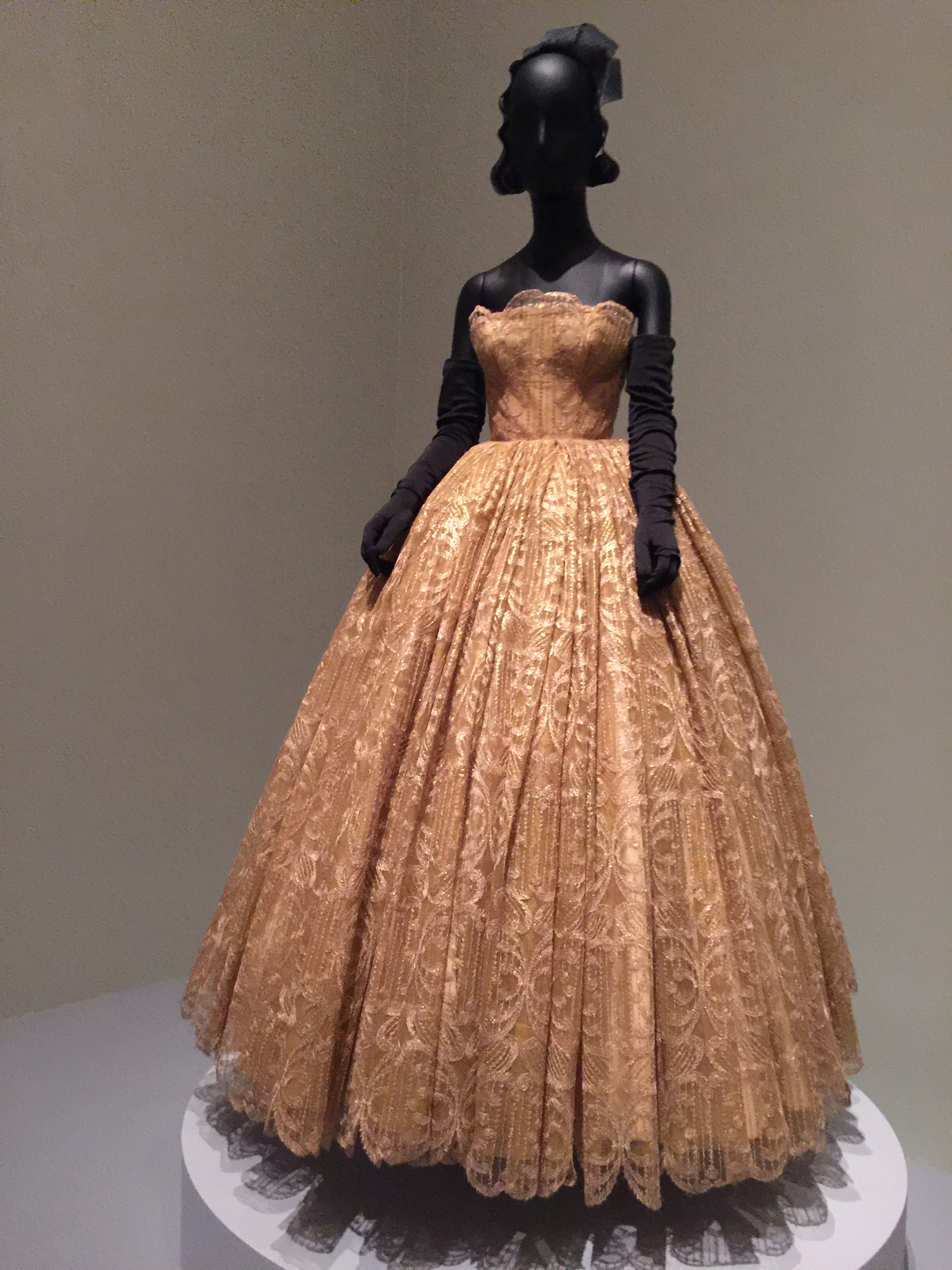
Gold lace evening dress illustrating Fogarty's "paper doll" silhouette and worn by the designer to receive an award in Philadelphia, c. 1953 (PMA)

While at Youth Guild, Fogarty developed one of her signature looks, the tight-bodied dress with a very full skirt worn over a stiffened nylon petticoat, influenced by Dior's New Look. As Fogarty was a junior size 7, with her small 22-inch waist and modeling experience, she was able to wear and show her own designs to advantage. Some of her dresses were featured in a double-page spread in Harper's Bazaar. In 1950, Fogarty was offered a design job at Margot Dresses, a company specializing in junior fashion. She worked there for seven years, designing not just dresses, but accessories, lingerie and outerwear. In 1957, Fogarty moved to Saks Fifth Avenue, where she was one of the main designers. She launched her own firm, Anne Fogarty Inc., in 1962, and in the mid-1960s, launched several spin-off labels including A.F. Boutique, Collector's Items by Anne Fogarty, and Clothes Circuit. She retired in 1974 and closed her business. Despite this, she worked up until her death as a free-lance designer, with her last collection created for Shariella Fashions in 1980.

Fogarty did not follow the latest fashion fads, but focused on staple, stylish designs. She was a disciplined designer whose clothes were designed to be versatile and easy to wear. Her designs were rarely trimmed as she focused instead on good cut and silhouette, and she favored casual fabrics such as flannel, velveteen, printed cotton, denim and linen, which appealed to a younger audience. In 1954, she designed her first shirtdress, a combination of a masculine shirt extending into a full skirt worn over multiple petticoats. This became one of her favorite designs. One of her most successful designs, a high-waisted dress with a full skirt and scooped neckline, has been described as the "Paper Doll" dress and was available in both day and evening versions. However, the fashion historian Caroline Rennolds Milbank states that the "paper-doll" silhouette describes Fogarty's earliest full-skirted designs. In the mid-1950s, in addition to her full-skirted designs, which always had separate crinoline petticoats for ease of movement and traveling, Fogarty developed new slimline designs such as the fitted sheath dress. She is also credited with being one of the first American fashion designers to market the bikini.

In 1960, Fogarty offered casual sportswear including dresses with removable waistcoats to alter their look, and coat-and-dress sets in boldly contrasting colors. During the 1960s she produced A-line dresses and, after the miniskirt became established, designed peasant-inspired dresses in both mini- and maxi-lengths. Her new favorite silhouette, replacing full skirts, was the straight-skirted, high-waisted Empire line dress with tiny puff sleeves and low neckline. Her designs in the later 1960s and 1970s became quite adventurous, including trouser suits and caftans. In 1971 she designed midriff tops paired with wrap skirts, and knickerbockers paired with pinafores, alongside more conservative designs such as flounced maxi dresses and taffeta and satin shirtdresses. She also offered hotpants ensembles with long skirts and ruffled blouses.

Fogarty won a number of awards for her design work. In 1951 she was awarded a Merit Award from Mademoiselle magazine and a Bonwit Teller award, and received a special Coty Award for the "prettiest dresses". The following year, Fogarty won a Neiman Marcus Fashion Award and received an award from the Philadelphia Fashion Group. In 1955 she received an honor from the International Silk Association and in 1957, won a Cotton Fashion Award. Following the Cotton Fashion Award ceremony, a fashion show showing Fogarty's Summer collection for that year was held. Called "Goldfish Safari," it presented cotton daywear, activewear, cocktail and evening wear in goldfish colors designed especially for travel and holiday wear. At the time, Fogarty said of her work:

Everyone's on the move. And so they need clothes that look right anywhere in the world, pack well, and are easy to care for. But most of all, today's women want clothes that make them look their best. That's what I try to give them.

Her clients included Tricia Nixon and the journalist and television personality Dorothy Kilgallen. Kilgallen's last public appearance, on a live network telecast of What's My Line? approximately four hours before her death, was in one of Fogarty's chiffon cocktail dresses.

== Personal life and death ==
Fogarty had two children with her first husband, Tom Fogarty. They were married for 17 years. Tom Fogarty worked as an art teacher at Pratt Institute in Brooklyn, New York. The marriage ended in divorce.

Dorothy Kilgallen's funeral, which occurred less than four days after she wore an original Fogarty dress on a live network telecast of What's My Line?, was attended by Fogarty. In 1967, Fogarty married Kilgallen's widower, Richard Kollmar. According to a 1971 interview she did with the syndicated newspaper columnist Marian Christy, Kollmar broke his shoulder in an accident at home on New Year's Day 1971, which caused a blood clot to develop, and he died "a month later" on Anne's birthday, which was February 2. The New York Times, The Washington Post and other newspapers, however, ran obituaries for Kollmar on January 9 and 10 of that year. The Washington Post reported on January 10 that Kollmar had "died in his sleep late Thursday [January 7]."

Fogarty was married a third time in 1977, to Wade O'Hara, but this marriage ended in divorce. On January 15, 1980, she died of a heart attack in her apartment in the high-rise building at 200 East 64th Street in Manhattan. She is buried, not next to any of her husbands, at Green-Wood Cemetery in Brooklyn, New York.

== Wife Dressing ==
Wife Dressing: The Fine Art of being a Well-Dressed Wife was first published in 1959. It is considered Fogarty's best known work. In 2008, Rosemary Feitenberg (a writer for Women's Wear Daily) rediscovered the book and had it republished. A facsimile reprint was issued in 2011 by the Victoria and Albert Museum. This latter was enthusiastically reviewed by the Belfast Telegraph who declared it "prim, dated and anachronistic, but still a delight".

Fogarty's principles continue to be cited by designers and historians such as Valerie Steele who has explained how they informed the costuming of Mad Men. In reference to Fogarty and Wife Dressing, Steele had earlier stated that the 1950s "ideology of ultra-feminine fashion was most clearly defined by a woman."
