= The Yellow Cab Man =

1950 film by Jack Donohue

- Directed by: Jack Donohue
- Written by: Albert Beich; Devery Freeman (screenplay and story)
- Produced by: Richard Goldstone
- Starring: Red Skelton; Gloria DeHaven; Edward Arnold
- Cinematography: Harry Stradling
- Edited by: Albert Akst
- Music by: Scott Bradley
- Production company: Metro-Goldwyn-Mayer
- Distributed by: Loew's, Inc.
- Release dates: March 26, 1950 (New York); April 9, 1950 (Los Angeles)
- Running time: 85 minutes
- Country: United States
- Language: English
- Budget: $1,195,000
- Box office: $2,599,000

The Yellow Cab Man is a 1950 American comedy film directed by Jack Donohue and starring Red Skelton, Gloria DeHaven and Edward Arnold. A brief sequence of distorted visual effects in the film is the work of the photographer Weegee, who also makes a cameo appearance as a cab driver.

== Plot ==
The inventor of a form of unbreakable glass tries to sell it to a taxicab company, hoping that they will produce unbreakable windshields.

== Cast ==
- Red Skelton as Augustus "Red" Pirdy
- Gloria DeHaven as Ellen Goodrich
- Edward Arnold as Martin Creavy
- Walter Slezak as Dr. Byron Dokstedder
- James Gleason as Mickey Corkins
- Jay C. Flippen as Hugo
- Paul Harvey as Pearson Hendricks
- Herbert Anderson as Willis Tomlin (as Guy Anderson)
- John Butler as Gimpy
- John Indrisano as Danny
- Polly Moran as Bride's mother

== Reception ==
In a contemporary review for The New York Times, critic Bosley Crowtherwrote: "The popular success of Red Skelton as a nominal Fuller brush man in the comedy of that title that came out a couple of years ago has obviously been the inspiration for the casting of Mr. S. in another familiar occupation—and in an equally familiar slapstick role. In 'The Yellow Cab Man,' ... the costume is slightly different but the fellow who's in it is the same. And the stuff that he does, while not as humorous (if you'll pardon the expression), is similar, too."

Critic Philip K. Scheuer of the Los Angeles Times wrote: "Skelton's is the kind of slapstick farce that is all too scarce these days, at least with legitimate slapstick farceurs in the leads, and is every bit as funny as 'The Fuller Brush Man.' What if more than one of its gags date back to the old two reelers? The marvel is that there is anybody left at the studios to remember them. Old or new, the film's inventiveness seldom flags. ... Skelton always comes up smiling, quick to forgive and ready to believe the best of his fellow men. He is the servant of the people, the courteous Yellow Cab Man."

According to MGM, the film earned $1,951,000 in the U.S. and Canada and $648,000 elsewhere, resulting in a profit of $545,000.
