= The Frank Sinatra Show (1950 TV series) =

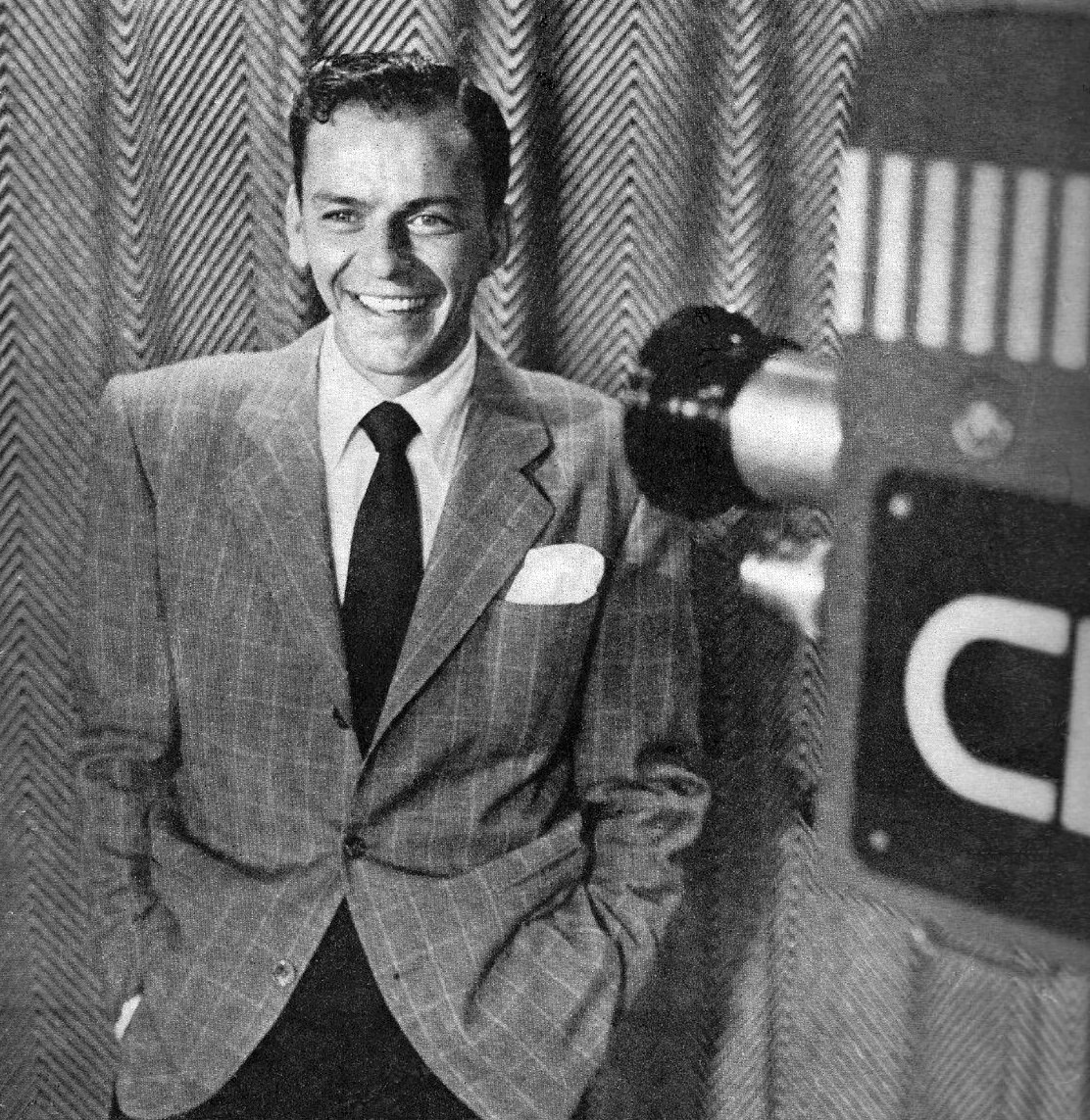
- Sinatra on the set in 1950
- Also known as: Bulova Watch Time
- Genre: Variety
- Directed by: Jack Donohue
- Presented by: Frank Sinatra
- Country of origin: United States
- Original language: English
- No. of seasons: 2

Production
- Executive producer: Marlo Lewis
- Producer: Jack Donohue
- Production locations: New York City, New York
- Running time: 25 minutes/48-50 minutes

Original release
- Network: CBS
- Release: October 7, 1950 – November 13, 1952

The Frank Sinatra Show (also known as Bulova Watch Time) is an American television musical variety series hosted by Frank Sinatra from October 7, 1950, to April 1, 1952. The series aired on CBS on Saturdays the first season and on Tuesdays for the second year. As with many variety shows of the time, the show was broadcast live and was recorded via kinescope. Some episodes were 30 minutes long while others lasted for 60 minutes. At least one episode aired in a 45-minute time-slot.

== Overview ==
The show was hosted by Frank Sinatra, with Ben Blue, Erin O'Brien, Sidney Fields, Joey Walsh, Pat Gaye, Roberta Lee, The Whipoorwills, and The Blue Family as regulars. Axel Stordahl led the orchestra, and Ken Roberts was the announcer.

The series was initially sponsored by Bulova Watches, which ended the relationship after 13 weeks. Sinatra would perform songs and sketches with his guests. The series is reportedly in the public domain.

In its first season, the show's competition included Your Show of Shows ("then a red-hot sensation"), and in the second season it included Texaco Star Theater ("the number-one show in television"), making the series "arguably doomed to failure". In his book The Forgotten Network: DuMont and the Birth of American Television (2004), David Weinstein claims that the surprise popularity of the DuMont Television Network series Life Is Worth Living in 1952 was the final blow that led to the cancellation of The Frank Sinatra Show. He notes that controversy surrounding Sinatra's affair with Ava Gardner, along with several unpopular singles, had caused ratings to slip. Other sponsors came and went, but low ratings led to Sinatra's contract being terminated early.

Life Is Worth Living, which averaged about 10 million viewers at a time when there were four major television networks in the United States, eroded the ratings of the show even further, to the point that The Frank Sinatra Show finally left the air.

== Guest stars ==
- Brian Aherne
- Don Ameche
- Eddie 'Rochester' Anderson
- The Andrews Sisters
- Toni Arden
- Louis Armstrong
- Eileen Barton
- Jack Benny
- Milton Berle
- Larry J. Blake
- Mari Blanchard
- Joan Blondell
- Eric Blore
- Victor Borge
- Jimmy Boyd
- Joe Bushkin
- Jean Carroll
- Perry Como
- Jackie Coogan
- Broderick Crawford
- Arlene Dahl
- Dagmar
- Cass Daley
- Denise Darcel
- Laraine Day
- Yvonne De Carlo
- George DeWitt
- Leo Durocher
- Faye Emerson
- Douglas Fairbanks, Jr.
- Sidney Fields
- Frank Fontaine
- Tennessee Ernie Ford
- Phil Foster
- Zsa Zsa Gabor
- Jack Gilford
- Jackie Gleason
- Larry Griswold
- Edmund Gwenn
- Toni Harper
- Dick Haymes
- Skitch Henderson
- June Hutton (regular performer)
- Beatrice Kay
- Betty and Jane Kean
- Buster Keaton
- Pert Kelton
- Irv Kupcinet
- Frankie Laine
- Muriel Landers
- Joe Laurie, Jr.
- Peggy Lee
- Ben Lessy
- Liberace
- Diana Lynn
- Hal March and Bob Sweeney
- James Mason
- Pamela Mason
- Marilyn Maxwell
- Mike Mazurki
- George McManus
- Borrah Minevitch
- Garry Moore
- Patricia Morison
- Alan Mowbray
- Jan Murray
- J. Carrol Naish
- Conrad Nagel
- The Pied Pipers
- Roger Price
- Basil Rathbone
- John Serry Sr. (accordion accompanist)
- Phil Silvers
- Walter Slezak
- Smith & Dale
- Harold J. Stone
- Stump and Stumpy
- Yma Sumac
- Grady Sutton
- George Tobias
- The Three Stooges
- Rudy Vallée
- Sarah Vaughan
- Nancy Walker
- Marie Wilson
- Alan Young

== Production ==
Marlo Lewis was the executive producer of The Frank Sinatra Show, which originated from WCBS. The show's last broadcast was on April 1, 1952. It was replaced by Out There.

After the show's first episode, John Peyser was brought in to be the director, remaining in that position for 32 weeks. He pointed out that Sinatra's schedule affected the quality of the show, as the star arrived from Los Angeles each Friday morning and returned home immediately after the Saturday broadcast. Lack of access to Sinatra during the week hampered planning of sketches and songs.

== Critical response ==
A review of the premiere episode in the trade publication Variety said that "CBS video entrepreneurs did practically everything to checkmate the star", citing "bad pacing, bad scripting, bad tempo, poor camera work and overall jerky presentation". Despite those problems, the review said that Sinatra had "bigtime TV potential", noting his "considerable charm, ease, and the ability to sell a song". The review questioned use of Sinatra as a straightman for Blue and the song selected to close the episode. Highlights that it singled out were the opening song and a skit that Sinatra did with guest J. Carroll Naish.
