= Early to Bed (musical) =

1943 American musical

- Music: Fats Waller
- Lyrics: George Marion Jr.
- Book: George Marion Jr.
- Setting: Interwar Martinique
- Premiere: 24 May 1943: Shubert Theatre, Boston, US
- Productions: 1943 Shubert Theatre, Boston; 1943 Broadhurst Theatre, Broadway, New York City; 2009 New York City revival

Early to Bed is a musical produced by Richard Kollmar with music by Fats Waller, and lyrics and book by George Marion Jr. The comic farce takes place in a brothel in Martinique, which various visitors arriving for an international athletics competition mistake for a finishing school. The madam attempts to maintain this misapprehension while various characters have romantic dalliances.

It premiered in Boston, Massachusetts, in 1943 before moving to Broadway for a year-long run, and it subsequently went on tour. Much of the original material for Early to Bed was lost after the tour, including four of its songs, and no cast recordings exist due to the 1942–1944 musicians' strike. Some of its songs were published as sheet music, and Waller recorded versions of some of them himself, but he died suddenly during the Broadway run. Two of its songs feature in the 1978 revue Ain't Misbehavin', and the show was reconstructed and performed as a small-scale revival in 2009.

Early to Bed received highly positive reviews, with critics praising the performances and visual elements. Waller's music received a more mixed reception, and the plot, though one-dimensional, was considered enjoyable.

Despite its success, Early to Bed came at a time when Broadway musicals were becoming more ambitious in scope, and its variety show aesthetic quickly became dated, limiting historical interest and the appetite for revivals. Today it is best known for featuring the music of Waller, and it marks the first instance of a black composer writing a Broadway show for a mostly white cast.

== Background ==
Early to Bed was conceived and planned by the broadway producer Richard Kollmar. Kollmar had recently produced Beat the Band in 1942, which had been a commercial failure, and he was looking to stage something more successful. He engaged George Marion Jr., who had written the script and lyrics to Beat the Band, as the librettist and lyricist for Early to Bed. Kollmar's original choice of composer was Ferde Grofe, best known for orchestrating Rhapsody in Blue by George Gershwin, but Grofe pulled out in March 1943. Fats Waller, who was already a famous musician, was originally intended only to act as one of the show's performers, but he agreed to compose for the production. After an incident in which Waller, urgently in need of money, drunkenly threatened to withdraw from the production unless Kollmar agreed to buy the rights to his Early to Bed music for $1,000, Kollmar considered it too risky to rely on Waller as a performer. He therefore became only the show's composer.

With Marion based in California and Waller in New York, they largely worked separately, with the melodies mostly written before the lyrics. Costumes were designed by Miles White and choreography by Robert Alton, both highly experienced Broadway workers, and set design was by George C. Jenkins. Orchestration was undertaken by Don Walker (who later went on to work on Carousel (1945)), assisted by Ted Royal, Robert Noeltner and Buck Warnick. Kollmar reputedly secured 109 financial backers for Early to Bed, including Milton Berle and Sherman Billingsley.

== Synopsis ==
Each of the two acts of Early to Bed is framed as a flashback being narrated by a character named O'Connor in a present-day New York bar. The action takes place in interwar Martinique. El Magnifico, an ageing Spanish bullfighter, is travelling to the "Pan-American Goodwill Games" (Note: The musical predates both the Pan American Games and the Goodwill Games.) with his son, Pablo, and his valet, Pooch, when his car breaks down. The son is hit by another car and is taken to recover at the Angry Pigeon, a bordello run by Rowena, a former schoolteacher. The woman who was driving, a nightclub dancer named Lois who was travelling to a gig, is also injured, and is taken to the Angry Pigeon as well. The pair fall in love. El Magnifico and Rowena have had a romantic affair in the past, and still feel a connection, and Pooch and Rowena's maid Lily-Ann are also attracted to each other.

At the Angry Pigeon is a newly hired prostitute named Eileen – of all the newcomers, she is the only one who understands that the Angry Pigeon is a brothel, with all the others assuming it is a finishing school. Rowena keeps the true nature of the establishment hidden in order to continue wooing El Magnifico. Presently, the California State University track team arrive in the area for the Goodwill Games, and El Magnifico invites them to stay at the Angry Pigeon. Together with the prostitutes they build a parade float for the Games, but the effort expended on building it, and interacting with the prostitutes, leads to the team losing. President Roosevelt congratulates them via radio regardless, assuming that they deliberately allowed the other countries to win, and the Martinique mayor acknowledges Rowena and the Angry Pigeon for their role. All the couples are united.

== Original principal cast ==
- John Lund as O'Connor
- Richard Kollmar as El Magnifico
- George Zoritch as Pablo
- Jane Deering as Lois
- Muriel Angelus as Rowena
- Jane Kean as Eileen
- Bob Howard as Pooch

== Music ==
=== Musical numbers ===
==== Act one ====
- "A Girl Who Doesn't Ripple When She Bends"
- "There's a Man in My Life"
- "Me and My Old World Charm"
- "Supple Couple"
- "Slightly Less Than Wonderful"
- "Slightly Less Than Wonderful" (reprise)
- "This Is So Nice (It Must Be Illegal)"
- "Hi-De-Ho High"
- "The Ladies Who Sing with the Band"
- "There's 'Yes' in the Air"

==== Act two ====
- "Get Away, Young Man"
- "Long Time No Song"
- "Early to Bed"
- "There's a Man in My Life"
- "When the Nylons Bloom Again"
- Finale

=== Publications ===
Four of the songs are now lost, having never been published or recorded and with only partial lyrics surviving: "A Girl Who Doesn't Ripple When She Bends", "Me and My Old World Charm", "Supple Couple" and "Get Away, Young Man".

Six of the songs were published as sheet music: "Slightly Less Than Wonderful", "This Is So Nice", "Hi-De-Ho High", "When the Nylons Bloom Again", "The Ladies Who Sing with the Band" and "There's a Man in My Life".

No original cast recordings exist, either in whole or part, as the show ran during a musicians' strike against recording companies. It is possible that a recording would not have been made regardless, as the practice of recording a musical with its original cast had only just begun, and even then was only done for the most prestigious productions. Waller died shortly into the Broadway run, but he recorded "Slightly Less Than Wonderful" and "This Is So Nice" on V-disc for the armed forces, and he also recorded "Ladies" and "There's a Man in My Life" (as "There's a Girl in My Life"). "There's a 'Yes' in the Air" was recorded as an instrumental as "Martinique".

Some songs were played on the cabaret circuit in the 1950s. "The Ladies Who Sing with the Band" and "When the Nylons Bloom Again" feature in the 1978 revue Ain't Misbehavin'.

== Productions ==
Rehearsals began on 22 April 1943, and the premiere took place at the Shubert Theatre in Boston on 24 May. Reviews were generally positive, and the run was extended to 12 June. There was some criticism of its sexual aspects, and censorship from the Boston authorities led to the setting changing from a brothel to a casino and prostitutes becoming "hostesses". The show moved to the Broadhurst Theatre on Broadway, and the original setting was restored. The Broadway premiere took place on 17 June 1943 and the show ran until 13 May 1944, totalling 380 or 382 performances. After this run finished, it went on tour with a mostly different cast including Mervyn Nelson.

After the tour much of the original material for Early to Bed was lost. In 2009 the show was revived on a small scale by the off-Broadway company Musicals Tonight, running for 16 performances. In order to help reconstruct the show, the company's staff located Harold "Stumpy" Cromer, a tap dancer who had played a character named Caddy in the original run and the role of Pooch in the tour.

== Reception ==
Reviews of Early to Bed were overwhelmingly positive, and the show proved to be very popular. Critics commended Kollmar as the ageing Spanish bullfighter, especially in regards to his singing, and the young Jane Kean's comic performance as a prostitute. They also praised the visual elements, describing them as "colourful", and "prismatic and opalescent". Wilella Waldorf noted that the loudest applause was given to the scenery changes.

The plot was criticised for being one-dimensional, relying on one single farcical joke ("one of the most tedious books on record", according to the New York Times), but it was nevertheless enjoyed by audiences. Despite the setting and suggestive title (one subtitle was "A Fairy Tale for Grown-Ups"), the scholar Ethan Mordden notes that its suggestiveness does not tip over to actual explicit content, and that it "even failed to be banned in Boston", although changes to the script were made to appease the censors there. Burton Rascoe went so far as to write that "it's a show your sixteen-year-old daughter can take ... the pastor and your maiden aunt to".

The music received more mixed reviews. "The Ladies Who Sing with the Band" was singled out for praise; it proved to be one of the show's highlights and frequently served as an encore. The songs in general were described as "delightful" in the New York Journal-American and "tuneful" in the New York Herald Tribune, but merely "acceptable" and "by no means exciting" by Louis Kronenberger, and "curiously unmusical" by Burns Mantle.

== Analysis ==
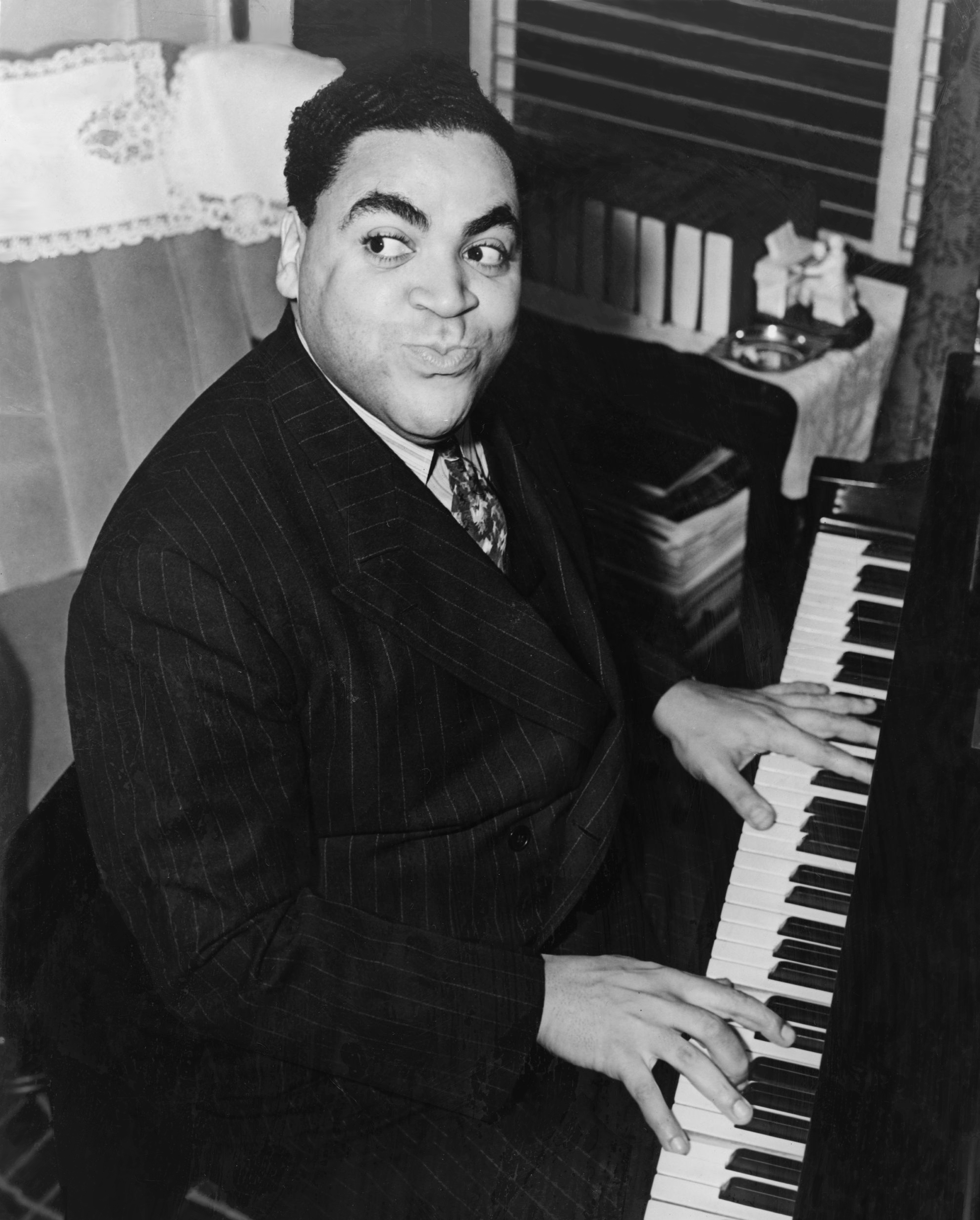
Fats Waller in 1938

Early to Bed was intended as casual entertainment rather than anything more serious. However, it came at a time when Broadway musicals were becoming more ambitious in artistic scope, with engaging storylines and songs which advance the narrative, exemplified by Oklahoma!, which opened the same year. In this sense Early to Bed was old-fashioned, more akin to a variety show, which limits its appeal to modern audiences and musicologists, and therefore the appetite for a revival. The nature of the show as light entertainment was also a contributing factor in the loss of its material.

The musical is now most notable for featuring Waller's music, but at the time the show was publicised and reviewed as a Kollmar production, with little attention paid to Waller's contribution. Kollmar had intended it as a comeback from the failure of Beat the Band, and Waller was not the original composer, so Early to Bed was not conceived as a "Fats Waller musical".

Waller's involvement made Early to Bed the first Broadway musical with a mostly white cast written by a black composer. Waller suddenly died six months into the Broadway run, leaving unanswered the question of whether Early to Bed would have represented a new direction in his career – Kollmar was already in discussions with him over setting up a new show. The academic John McWhorter has argued that, had Waller lived, he may have had a notable impact on the history of musical theatre, especially in regards to black artists.

== Sources ==
- Cullen, Frank; Hackman, Florence; McNeilly, Donald (2007). Vaudeville, Old & New Vol. 1. New York: Routledge. ISBN 9780415938532.
- Dietz, Dan (2015). "1943-1944 Season". The Complete Book of 1940s Broadway Musicals. London: Rowman & Littlefield. ISBN 9781442245280.
- McWhorter, John H. (October 2013). "Long Time, No Song: Revisiting Fats Waller's Lost Broadway Musical". Daedalus. 142 (4): 109–119. doi:10.1162/DAED_a_00238.
- McWhorter, John (18 October 2013). "In Search of a Lost Fats Waller Musical". The New Yorker. Archived from the original on 7 February 2023.
- McWhorter, John (24 September 2021). "My Mission to Ferret Out a Lost Broadway Score". New York Times. Archived from the original on 22 November 2023.
- Mordden, Ethan (1999). Beautiful Mornin': The Broadway Musical in the 1940s. Oxford: Oxford University Press. ISBN 0195128516.
- Shipton, Alyn (2002). Fats Waller: The Cheerful Little Earful (Rev. ed.). London New York: Continuum. pp. 2, 132. ISBN 0826457967.
- Waller, Maurice; Calabrese, Anthony (2017). Fats Waller. University of Minnesota Press. ISBN 978-1452956671.
