= Princess Angela of Liechtenstein =

Princess of Liechtenstein (born 1958)

Princess Angela
- Countess of Rietberg
- Born: Angela Gisela Brown; February 3, 1958 (age 68); Bocas Town, Bocas del Toro, Panama
- Spouse: Prince Maximilian of Liechtenstein (m. 2000)
- Issue: Prince Alfons
- House: Liechtenstein (by marriage)
- Father: Javier Francisco Brown
- Mother: Silvia Maritza Burke

Princess Angela of Liechtenstein, Countess of Rietberg (Spanish: Ángela, born Angela Gisela Brown; February 3, 1958) is an American fashion designer and member of the Liechtenstein princely family. Born in Panama and raised in the United States, Angela became the first woman of primarily African descent to marry into a reigning European dynasty. She married Prince Maximilian of Liechtenstein in January 2000 and the couple has a son, Prince Alfons, who is sixth in the line of succession to the Liechtensteiner throne.

== Early life and education ==
Angela Gisela Brown was born on February 3, 1958, in Bocas Town, Bocas del Toro, Panama, to businessman Javier Francisco Brown and homemaker Silvia Maritza Burke. The family moved to New York City, United States, when Angela was five years old.

After finishing high school, Angela studied fashion at Parsons School of Design, where she received the Oscar de la Renta Gold Thimble Award and graduated in 1980. She was a stylist for three years before partnered with a firm in Hong Kong to create her own fashion label named "A. Brown". She became a creative director for the fashion brand Adrienne Vittadini, an American fashion house with a flagship in Beverly Hills at the time, until September 1999.

== Marriage ==
Angela met Prince Maximilian of Liechtenstein, the second son of Hans-Adam II, Prince of Liechtenstein, at a private party in New York in 1997. In 1999, the Principality of Liechtenstein's Information Bureau announced the forthcoming nuptials of Prince Maximilian to Angela Brown. Angela married Prince Maximilian civilly on January 21, 2000, in Vaduz, Liechtenstein, and religiously on January 29, 2000, at 11:00 am, at the Church of St. Vincent Ferrer in New York City, wearing a dress she had designed herself and the Kinsky tiara, an heirloom kept by the House of Liechtenstein since 1870.

The marriage brought a person of Afro-Panamanian ancestry into one of the remaining reigning families of Europe. The groom obtained prior consent and full support of the sovereign, who also attended the wedding. She is the first woman of African descent to marry into a reigning European dynasty. While some members of the princely house were reportedly shocked and considered the interracial marriage "the end of an era", as well as the fact Angela is eleven years older than Prince Maximilian, others were said to have expressed support.

Prince Maximilian and Princess Angela have a son:

- Prince Alfons Constantin Maria of Liechtenstein, Count of Rietberg (born on May 18, 2001, in London, United Kingdom).

Since her marriage, Princess Angela participates, sometimes with her son, in official events in the principality. In 2006, Angela and her husband attended the wedding of Countess Elisabeth d'Udekem d'Acoz (sister of Queen Mathilde of Belgium) and Margrave Alfonso Pallavicini. In 2015, Princess Angela gave an interview about Panama tourism. She and her family also spent time in Pedasí, Panama.

The couple owns a property in Puerto Escondido, Pedasí, where the family usually spends part of the Christmas holidays.

== Titles and styles ==
Styles of Princess Angela of Liechtenstein
- Reference style: Her Serene Highness
- Spoken style: Your Serene Highness

Angela became a princess of Liechtenstein and Countess of Rietberg upon her marriage to Prince Maximilian, entitled to the style of Serene Highness. She also bears the coat of arms of the princely house.

== See also ==
- Princely Family of Liechtenstein
