= Happy Anniversary and Goodbye =

- Genre: Comedy
- Written by: Arthur Julian; Arnie Rosen
- Directed by: Jack Donohue
- Starring: Lucille Ball; Art Carney; Nanette Fabray; Peter Marshall; Don Porter
- Music by: Nelson Riddle
- Country of origin: United States
- Original language: English

Production
- Executive producer: Lucille Ball
- Producer: Gary Morton
- Production locations: Paramount Studios - 5555 Melrose Avenue, Hollywood, Los Angeles, California; Las Vegas
- Cinematography: Maury Gertsman
- Editor: John M. Foley
- Running time: 60 minutes
- Production company: Desilu Productions

Original release
- Network: CBS
- Release: November 19, 1974

Happy Anniversary and Goodbye is a 1974 American television film directed by Jack Donohue and starring Lucille Ball and Art Carney as Norma and Malcolm Michaels.

== Plot ==
Norma and Malcolm Michaels are a middle-aged married couple who are in the midst of a midlife crisis. Both decide to separate and begin their lives anew, away from each other. However, problems ensue once they discover that they are no longer as young as they used to be. In the end, they realize that they still love each other.

== Cast ==
- Lucille Ball as Norma Michaels
- Art Carney as Malcolm Michaels
- Nanette Fabray as Fay
- Peter Marshall as Greg Carter
- Don Porter as Ed "Mad Dog" Murphy
- Arnold Schwarzenegger as massage therapist Rico, the object of Norma's lascivious gawking.

== Production ==
Ball cast Schwarzenegger after seeing him in an episode of The Merv Griffin Show. The film was shot before a live audience.

== Reception ==
=== Critical response ===
The special was the fourth highest rated program for the week, and it won its time slot with a rating of 27.9 and 42% share of the viewing audience.
