= Rhythm in the Air =

1936 film by Arthur B. Woods

- Swedish poster
- Directed by: Arthur B. Woods
- Written by: Jack Donohue; Vina de Vesci
- Produced by: Michael Balcon
- Starring: Jack Donohue; Tutta Rolf
- Cinematography: Roy Kellino
- Music by: Colin Wark (music director)
- Distributed by: Fox British
- Release date: 1936
- Running time: 72 minutes
- Country: United Kingdom
- Language: English

Rhythm in the Air is a 1936 British comedy dance film directed by Arthur B. Woods and starring husband and wife dance partners Jack Donohue and Tutta Rolf. The film was a quota quickie production, written by Donohue and Vina de Vesci, and was reportedly largely autobiographical, as the events in the film closely mirrored Donohue own experience of coming to be a dancer.

== Plot ==
Jack Donovan, a riveter working on the construction of a high-rise building, is distracted from his work by spying through a nearby window on a lissom young woman Mary as she rehearses her tap-dancing routines. When she finishes, he pauses to give the unsuspecting Mary an ovation of cheers and wolf-whistles, but in the process loses his balance and falls to the ground, breaking both ankles.

The sympathetic Mary, who witnessed his fall, later visits him in hospital. Finding him very attractive, she claims that as his bones start to mend, tap-dancing is a wonderful way to strengthen his muscles and joints. He laughs at the absurdity of the suggestion.

Fully recovered, Jack goes back to his job, only to find that he has developed a new and severe fear of heights and it is quite impossible to continue in his line of work. He meets up again with Mary, and now takes her up on her suggestion of learning to tap. He finds he has a natural aptitude, and soon takes up dancing professionally. The couple fall in love, and are soon married.

== Cast ==
- Jack Donohue as Jack Donovan
- Tutta Rolf as Mary
- Vic Oliver as Tremayne
- Leslie Perrins as director
- Kitty Kelly as Celia
- Tony Sympson as Alf
- Terry-Thomas as Frankie

== Reception ==
The Monthly Film Bulletin wrote: "The story (said to be based on Jack Donohue's life) is a pleasant trifle; the dialogue is not sparkling, but it has the merit of not being forced, and is spoken in a natural manner. The dancing, which is the mainstay of the picture, includes several well-staged ensembles as well as agile solo numbers, and serves to introduce some pleasant lyrics. The settings are best when they are frankly theatrical. Photography is competent throughout."

Picturegoer wrote: "This picture will prove welcome to those who like tap-dancing, for Jack Donohue puts over some numbers which are on the Astaire level; actually he is the mainstay of an otherwise rather indifferent and thin story. There are some well-staged dance ensembles and Tutta Rolf puts up a sound performance as a wisecracking chorus girl. "

Picture Show wrote: "An entertaining comedy romance has been made from the slender story of a riveter who finds fame as a dancer through breaking both his ankles. Jack Donohue and his wife, Tutta Rolf, give pleasant performances in the leading roles, and there are some well-staged dances."
