= Assault on a Queen =

1966 film by Jack Donohue

- Theatrical release poster
- Directed by: Jack Donohue
- Screenplay by: Rod Serling
- Based on: Assault on a Queen by Jack Finney
- Produced by: William Goetz
- Starring: Frank Sinatra; Virna Lisi; Tony Franciosa
- Cinematography: William H. Daniels
- Edited by: Archie Marshek
- Music by: Duke Ellington; Nathan Van Cleave
- Production companies: Seven Arts Productions; Sinatra Enterprises
- Distributed by: Paramount Pictures
- Release date: June 15, 1966
- Running time: 106 minutes
- Country: United States
- Language: English
- Box office: $2.7 million (est. US/ Canada rentals)

Assault on a Queen is a 1966 American action-adventure film directed by Jack Donohue and starring Frank Sinatra and Virna Lisi. Based on a 1959 novel by Jack Finney, it was adapted for the screen by Rod Serling and released by Paramount Pictures on June 15, 1966. The supporting cast features Tony Franciosa and Richard Conte.

== Plot ==
After a World War II-era German submarine that has been missing for 20 years is retrieved in the Bahamas by diver Mark Brittain, the wealthy Rosa Lucchesi and her partner Vic Rossiter, who have been searching for sunken Spanish galleons, hire the submarine. Eric Lauffnauer, a U-boat officer during the war, devises a plan to stage a daring million-dollar heist aboard the British ocean liner RMS Queen Mary while the ship is crossing the Atlantic Ocean. Brittain returns the submarine to operational order with the assistance of his partner Linc and new man Moreno, a war hero and expert with engines.

Disguised as officers from a British submarine on a top-secret mission, Brittain, Rossiter and Lauffnauer bluff their way aboard the Queen Mary and threaten its captain with a torpedo attack if he or his crew refuse to comply with their demands to be granted access to the cash in the ship's safe. They reach the safe and stuff large bags full of cash. After trying to wrest a valuable ring from a lady's finger, Rossiter is shot and killed by a member of the Queen Mary's crew.

The two surviving men flee the Queen Mary and reach the submarine, but Brittain must abandon the stolen money when Lauffnauer prepares to dive the submarine without him. When a U.S. Coast Guard cutter in the vicinity comes to the ocean liner's aid, Lauffnauer wants to fire the submarine's torpedoes at it, but Brittain voices strong opposition. Lauffnauer draws a gun and a scuffle ensues in which Lauffnauer accidentally shoots his friend Moreno. Lauffnauer manages to fire the torpedoes but the Coast Guard men destroy them before they can reach the cutter. Brittain, Rosa and Linc dive off the submarine just before the cutter rams into it, killing Lauffnauer. The three remaining gang members survive, paddling a raft with no loot and headed for South America.

== Cast ==
- Frank Sinatra as Mark Brittain
- Virna Lisi as Rosa Lucchesi
- Tony Franciosa as Vic Rossiter
- Richard Conte as Tony Moreno
- Alf Kjellin as Eric Lauffnauer
- Reginald Denny as Master-at-Arms
- Errol John as Linc Langley
- Murray Matheson as the Captain
- John Warburton as Bank Manager

== Production ==
The U.S. Coast Guard cutter seen in the film was portrayed by the Miami-based USCGC Androscoggin (WHEC-68). The USCGC Minnetonka (WHEC-67) is also listed in the film's final credits, as it was shown in some scenes. At the time of filming, Minnetonka was homeported in Long Beach, California, close to Paramount's studio facilities in Hollywood.

== Release ==
Assault on a Queen was released on DVD and Blu-ray disc by Olive Films on March 27, 2012, in Region 1 widescreen.

== Similar plot elements ==
- The Clive Cussler 1973 Dirk Pitt adventure novel The Mediterranean Caper involves a similar plot in which an international criminal using a salvaged U-boat engages in criminal enterprises.
