= Prince Maximilian of Liechtenstein =

Second son of Prince Hans-Adam II and Marie, Princess of Liechtenstein

Prince Maximilian
- Count of Rietberg
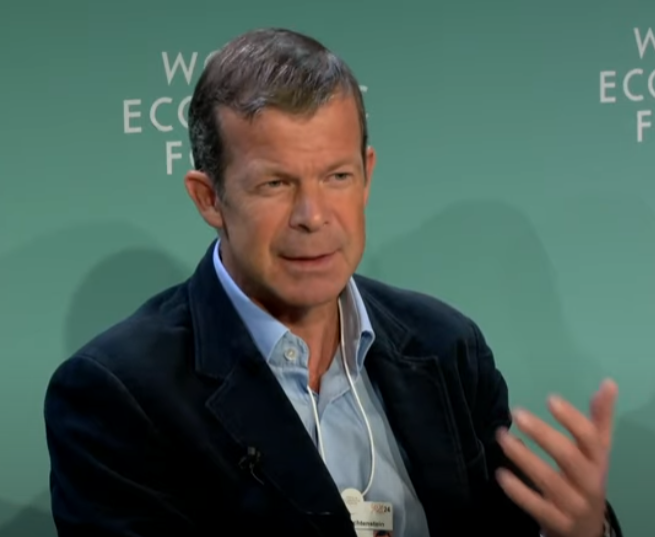
- Maximilian in 2024
- Born: 16 May 1969 (age 57); St. Gallen, Canton of St. Gallen, Switzerland
- Spouse: Angela Brown (m. 2000)
- Issue: Prince Alfons
Names
- Maximilian Nikolaus Maria von Liechtenstein
- House: Liechtenstein
- Father: Hans-Adam II, Prince of Liechtenstein
- Mother: Countess Marie Kinsky of Wchinitz and Tettau

Prince Maximilian of Liechtenstein, Count of Rietberg (né Maximilian Nikolaus Maria von Liechtenstein; born 16 May 1969), known professionally as Max von Liechtenstein, is a Liechtensteiner prince and businessman. He is the second son of Hans-Adam II, Prince of Liechtenstein and his wife, Countess Marie Kinsky of Wchinitz and Tettau.

== Education ==
After passing his examinations at the Liechtensteinisches Gymnasium in Vaduz, he studied at the European Business School in Oestrich-Winkel, Germany, and graduated in 1993. In 1998 he completed an MBA degree at Harvard Business School in Boston, Massachusetts.

== Career ==
Prince Maximilian went to work for Chase Capital Partners (the private equity arm of Chase Manhattan Corporation) in New York City. After an interval in which he earned his advanced degree in business and was married, he worked for two years for Industrie Kapital. In 2003, he began the management of the German office of JPMorgan Partners.

Since the spring of 2006, he has been the chief executive officer of the LGT Group. Professionally, he is referred to as Prince Max, rather than Prince Maximilian.

== Family ==
Prince Maximilian met Angela Brown, a Panamanian-American fashion designer, at a private party in New York in 1997. In 1999, the Principality of Liechtenstein's Information Bureau announced the forthcoming nuptials of Prince Maximilian to Angela Brown. Prince Maximilian married Angela civilly on 21 January 2000 in Vaduz, Liechtenstein, and religiously on 29 January 2000, at 11:00 am, at the Church of St. Vincent Ferrer in New York City.

The marriage brought a person of Afro-Panamanian ancestry into one of the remaining reigning families of Europe. Prince Maximilian obtained prior consent and full support of the sovereign, who also attended the wedding. While some members of the princely house were said to be shocked and to consider the interracial marriage and the eleven years age gap (with Angela being older than Prince Maximilian) "the end of an era", others were said to have expressed support.

Prince Maximilian and Princess Angela have a son:

- Prince Alfons Constantin Maria of Liechtenstein, Count of Rietberg (born on 18 May 2001 in London, England).

The couple owns a property in Puerto Escondido, Pedasí, where the family usually spends part of the Christmas holidays.

== Titles, styles and arms ==
Styles of Prince Maximilian of Liechtenstein
- Reference style: His Serene Highness
- Spoken style: Your Serene Highness

Maximilian is styled as His Serene Highness Prince Maximilian of Liechtenstein, Count of Rietberg. He also bears the coat of arms of the princely house.

Prince Maximilian of Liechtenstein House of Liechtenstein Born: 16 May 1969
Lines of succession
Preceded by Prince Nikolaus	Line of succession to Liechtenstein throne 5th in line	Succeeded by Prince Alfons
