= Church of St. Vincent Ferrer (Manhattan) =

Catholic church in New York City

- (2026)
- Church of St. Vincent Ferrer
- 40°45′58″N 73°57′53″W
- Location: 869 Lexington Avenue; Manhattan, NY
- Country: United States
- Denomination: Roman Catholic
- Religious order: Dominican Order
- Website: www.svsc.info

History
- Status: Parish church
- Founded: 1867 (chapel)
- Dedicated: May 5, 1918 (church)

Architecture
- Functional status: Active
- Architect(s): J. William Schickel, Bertram Goodhue
- Style: Late Gothic Revival (with Romanesque influences)
- Years built: 1914-18
- Construction cost: $1.5 million

Specifications
- Materials: Limestone

Administration
- Archdiocese: New York
- Deanery: South Manhattan
- Parish: St. Vincent Ferrer and St. Catherine of Siena

Clergy
- Pastor(s): Rev. Peter Martyr Yungwirth, OP
- St. Vincent Ferrer Church and Priory
- U.S. National Register of Historic Places
- New York State Register of Historic Places
- New York City Landmark
- NRHP reference No.: 84002800
- NYSRHP No.: 06101.000075
- NYCL No.: 0416

Significant dates
- Added to NRHP: June 14, 1984
- Designated NYSRHP: May 7, 1984
- Designated NYCL: February 28, 1967

The Church of St. Vincent Ferrer is a Catholic parish on the Upper East Side of Manhattan, New York City. It was built in 1918 by the Dominicans; the attached priory serves as the headquarters of the Eastern United States Province of the order.

The church's architecture has some unusual features: above the front entrance is one of the few statues of the Crucifixion on the exterior of an American Catholic church; and inside, the Stations of the Cross depict Christ with oil paintings instead of statuary or carvings. It has two Schantz pipe organs. The church building, at the corner of Lexington Avenue and East 66th Street in the Lenox Hill section of the Upper East Side, has been called "one of New York's greatest architectural adornments."

The church is under the patronage of Saint Vincent Ferrer, a Dominican preacher from Valencia, Spain. It was made a New York City designated landmark in 1967. Seventeen years later, in 1984, the church and priory, designed in 1881 by William Schickel, were listed on the National Register of Historic Places.

St. Vincent Ferrer High School for girls is on its grounds and is administered by resident Dominican Sisters. Members also work in charitable efforts like local shelters and food pantries. They are also involved in interfaith lobbying for affordable housing in Manhattan.

== Grounds ==
The church complex comprises four buildings, all on the block between East 65th and 66th on the east side of Lexington. Across the street are low rowhouses; just to the north are the Seventh Regiment Armory, a National Historic Landmark, and the apartment building at 131–35 East 66th Street, also a city landmark. The entire site is less than 1 acre (4,000 m^{2}) The address of the church, as listed in 1892, was 871 Lexington Avenue. Within the site, four buildings – the church, priory, Holy Name Society building and St. Vincent Ferrer High School — are connected by adjoining walls. All are architecturally compatible, but only the church and priory are considered contributing properties due to their age and simpler architecture.

The cruciform church is built of limestone laid in a random ashlar pattern on three sides. The east (rear) elevation, barely visible from the street, is faced in brick. On the west, facing Lexington Avenue, is the five-bay tower. It has two engaged octagonal towers flanking the large rose window, with stone tracery forming conjoined trefoils, in the center of the upper stage. Below the window is a tall round-arched entryway and stone steps topped with a carving of the Crucifixion. On the north and south the bays are divided by buttresses supporting the steeply pitched copper roof

Inside, the entire nave is finished in the exterior limestone. In addition to the rose window, all the side windows are filled with stained glass. Pews and choir stalls are in ornate carved wood, and the altar is set off by a carved stone reredos. At the rear the oak pulpit is decorated with carvings in medieval Gothic style. The Stations of the Cross are represented by oil paintings. A large four-manual console in the choir controls the two Schantz pipe organs, Opus 2145 in the choir and Opus 2224 in the west gallery. The interior also features two relics of St. Vincent Ferrer in the church and the only example of a hanging pyx that is not in a museum.

The priory, at the northeast corner of 65th and Lexington, is a five-story brick building on a brownstone foundation. Its facades are decorated with alternating stone and brick voussoirs, arched openings, stone bands at the imposts, pilasters and buttresses. The roofline is lined with stone and brick corbels below the cornice, with elongated stone corbels on the projecting gabled entrance tower in the center of the east (front) facade. A high brownstone stoop with cast iron newels and rails leads from the street to a deeply recessed, arched first floor entrance with clustered colonnettes. The mix of the brick and stone with the slate tiling on the dormer-pierced mansard roof gives the building a polychromatic effect.

The Holy Name Society building and school are both similar structures of brick and stone. Much of their detailing and ornament, such as their buttresses and tracery, echoes or mirrors that found on the church and priory. The Society building and school date to 1930 and 1948 respectively and are not considered sufficiently historic to be included in the National Register listing with the church and priory at this time.

== History ==
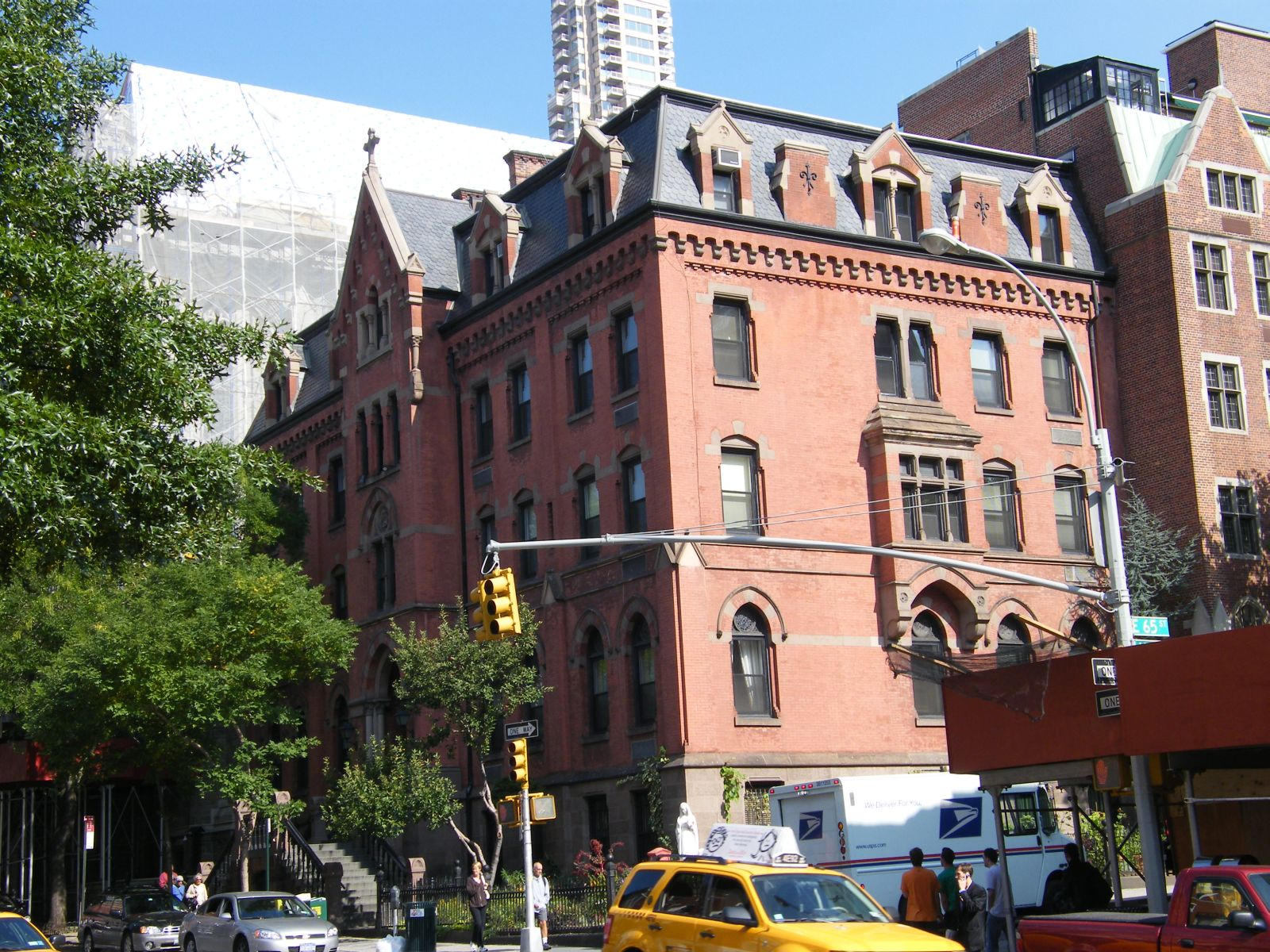
Priory on south side

=== 19th century ===
In the 1860s, a Dominican priest from France, Father Thomas Martin, was sent to the Diocese of New York and took up residence in a brownstone on Lexington Avenue and 62nd Street. Others followed, and the Dominicans became popular among the city's Catholic population. John McCloskey, the archbishop of the Diocese of New York and the first American cardinal, asked them to establish a parish on what is now the Upper East Side. Father Martin and the other priests borrowed $10,000 ($230,000 in contemporary dollars), bought 18 lots totaling 45,000 square feet (4,200 m^{2}) at the present location and began to construct a chapel on the northeast corner of 65th Street. The first Mass was offered in this chapel on July 2, 1867.

By 1879 the construction was expanded and on December 12, a second church was dedicated. Its first Mass was celebrated on the feast day of St. Vincent Ferrer, September 8, 1879. At the same time the order decided to build a priory at the church to serve as its provincial headquarters. It commissioned William Schickel, a German-born architect who had recently completed his first major work in New York, the John Crimmins House at 40 East 68th Street. The priory's intricate use of materials and its overall polychromy, characteristics of the High Victorian Gothic style popular in the late 19th century, reflect Schickel's training in Bavaria and the strong influence there of Friedrich von Gärtner. It was the first of many buildings Schickel would design for the New York diocese. Five years later, in 1884, the first school was built.

=== 20th and 21st centuries ===
The church would serve the congregation until 1914, when it was demolished in order to begin construction of a new one designed by Bertram Grosvenor Goodhue, who had recently struck out on his own from Cram, Goodhue & Ferguson. While it was being built, the congregation worshipped in a temporary building at East 67th Street.

The architect wrote to a friend that he considered St. Vincent Ferrer his best Gothic work; he designed the Gothic Revival church in the style of 14th-century French Gothic, with echoes of Romanesque. Lee Lawrie's carving of the Cross above the entrance was the first time one had been located on the exterior of an American Catholic church, and is still one of the few instances. Guastavino tile was used on the interior to provide for excellent acoustics;. Goodhue had Charles Connick's stained glass windows positioned so that the colors complemented each other. He also decided that, reflecting the Dominican Order's Spanish origins, the representations of Christ at each of the Stations of the Cross would be oil paintings rather than the statuary or carvings more commonly used in American Catholic churches. The images were painted by Telford and Ethel Paullin in imitation of styles from different countries and eras, which accounts for the changing color of Christ's robe between them.

As originally planned the church was to have a fifteen-story flèche. As construction progressed that became unfeasible. A former stream that passed under the site, as well as the construction of the IRT Lexington Avenue Line subway tunnels, made it impossible to lay a sufficient foundation. On October 22, 1916, the construction of the present incarnation of St. Vincent was completed, at a cost of $1.5 million ($44.4 million in contemporary dollars). It was dedicated on May 5, 1918, when over 50,000 people attended.

In 1930 the Holy Name Society building was constructed. It was one of architect Wilfred E. Anthony's many designs for the Catholic Church, and considered one of his best overall. The oaken High Pulpit was installed in the sanctuary. Its 14th-century French Gothic detailings were consistent with the church's architecture.

The school building quickly outgrew its intended design, and a new one was built over it in 1948. Architects Elliott Chisling-Ferenz & Taylor designed a building with sympathetic Gothic motifs that help it blend into the older buildings. Following Vatican II in the 1960s, the Dominican Order replaced their rite with the standard Roman Rite Mass of Paul VI in most parishes. A new altar was installed at the front of the choir, while the original High Altar at the rear continues to be used for reserving the Blessed Sacrament, special Solemn High Liturgies, and Dominican Rite Liturgies dedicated for the souls of Purgatory.

During the late 1960s and 1970s Andy Warhol, a devout Byzantine Catholic who lived nearby, attended Mass regularly at St. Vincent Ferrer. Father Sam Matarazzo, the priest at the time, remembers him sitting quietly in the back of the church, taking neither communion nor confession. He speculated that Warhol, one of many gay men who attended services at St. Vincent Ferrer despite Matarazzo's regular preaching of Catholic doctrine opposing homosexuality, was perhaps afraid of being recognized. Warhol himself said he was self-conscious about being seen crossing himself "the Orthodox way."

Later in the 20th century, contributions from William E. Simon and an anonymous donor allowed the church to purchase the newer of its two Schantz pipe organs. In the early 2000s a capital campaign allowed the church to install new heating and cooling systems, and restore its exterior. That latter project was complete in 2009.

On May 8, 2015, the Archdiocese of New York announced the merger of parishes between St Vincent Ferrer and St. Catherine of Siena Church. Both churches will remain open.

== Programs and services ==
The church celebrates Mass three times a day and four times on Sunday. Vigils are observed on Saturday nights and the evenings before Holy Days of Obligation. The Sacrament of Reconciliation (confession) is offered all evenings except Sunday. The Liturgy of the Hours is observed by the Dominican friars daily in the Friars' Chapel which is open to the public.

Outside the church, the congregation's Social Concerns Committee coordinates involvement in charitable work in the area. Members host holiday parties and bingo games at the Women's Shelter in the neighboring Park Avenue Armory, staff the Yorkville Common Pantry and assist members of nearby Jan Hus Presbyterian Church in feeding the homeless on Tuesday nights. The congregation is also a member organization of East Congregations for Housing Justice, which advocates for affordable housing in Manhattan.

== Notable people ==
Andy Warhol regularly attended Mass at the church.

In 2000, Prince Maximilian of Liechtenstein and Angela Brown married at the church.

Several notable funeral Masses have taken place at St. Vincent Ferrer. Dorothy Kilgallen's funeral Mass took place on November 11, 1965, with 2,600 people in attendance. The funeral Mass of politician Geraldine Ferraro took place on March 31, 2011; she and her husband John Zaccaro had been married at the church in 1960. The funeral Mass of businesswoman Ivana Trump took place there on July 20, 2022.

== Gallery ==
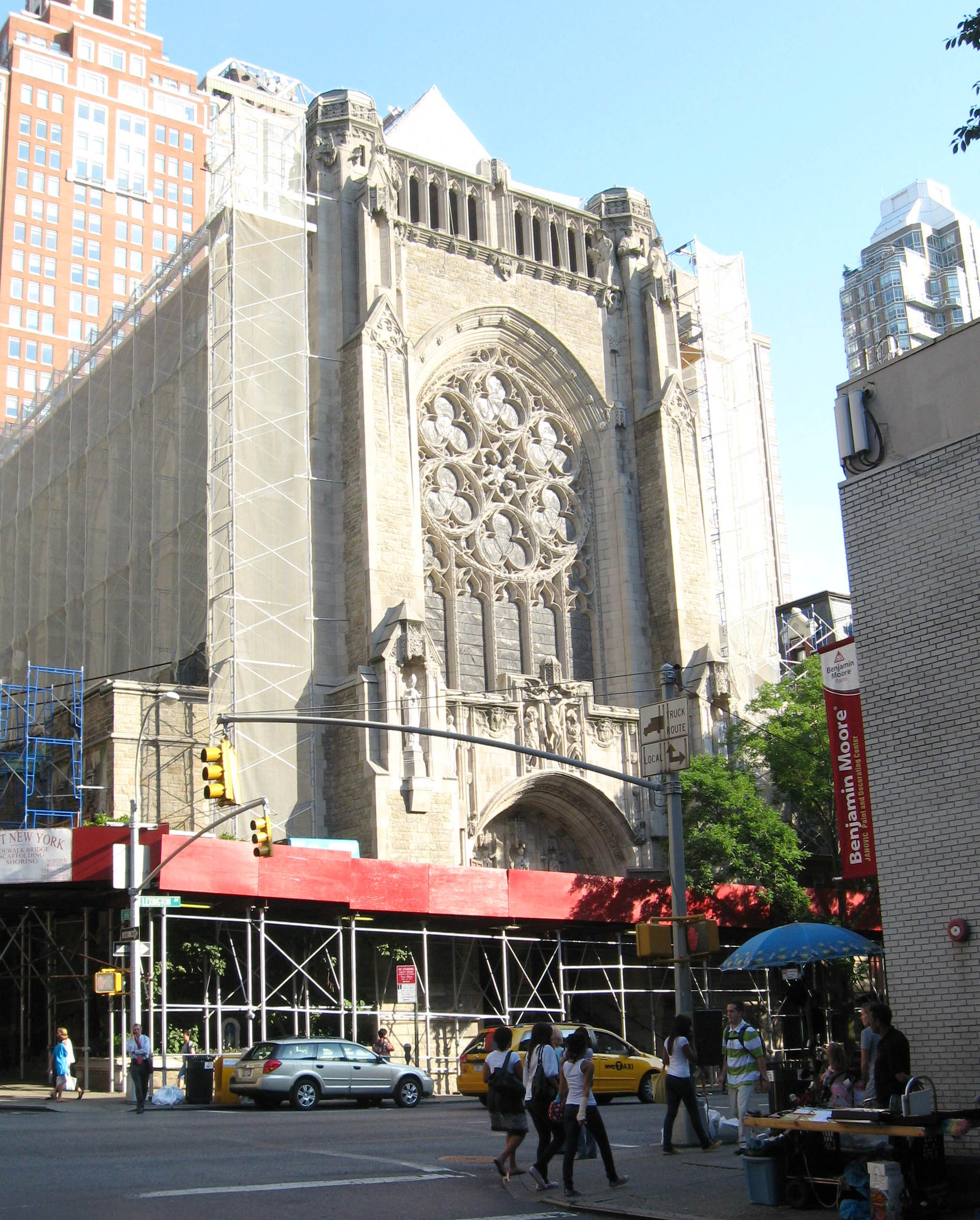
Church undergoing renovations in 2008

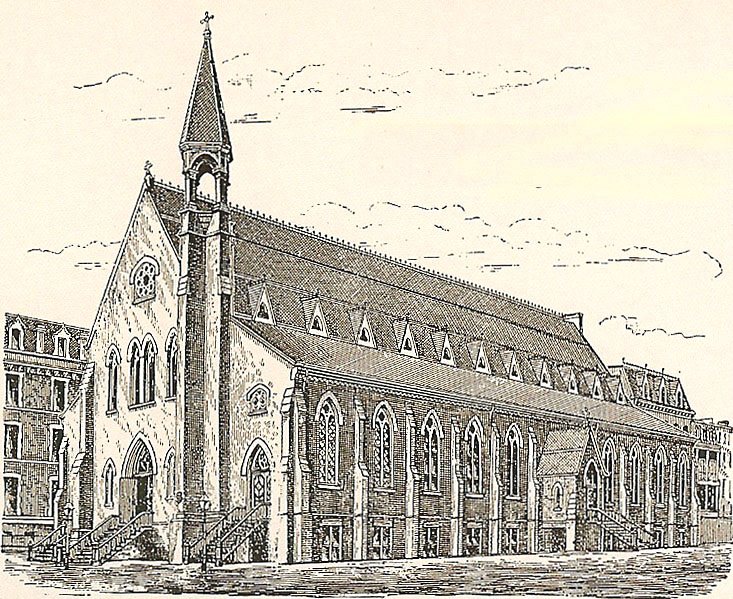
The first Church of St. Vincent Ferrer, known as the "Gothic barn"

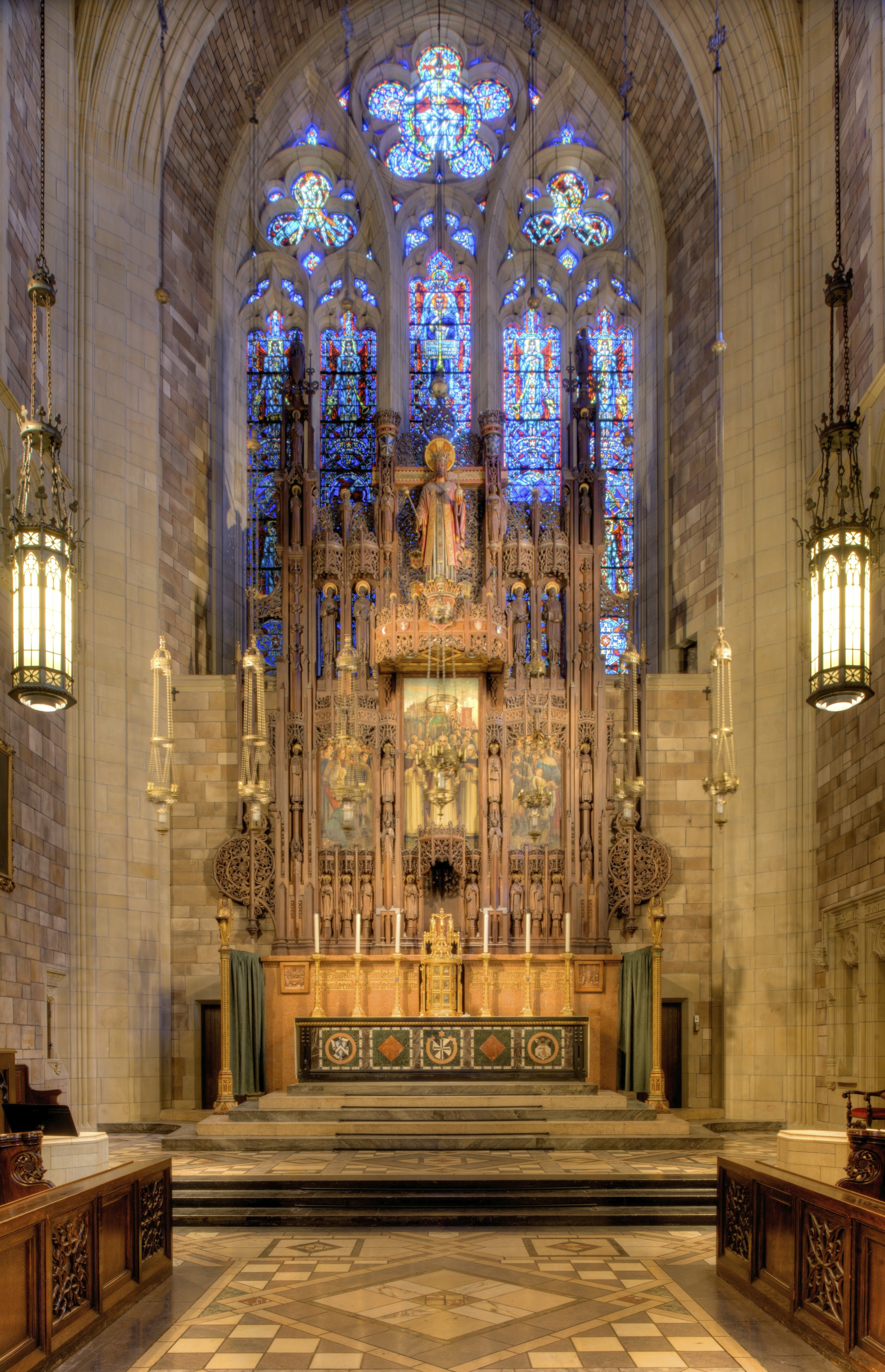
The Chancel and Altar of the church

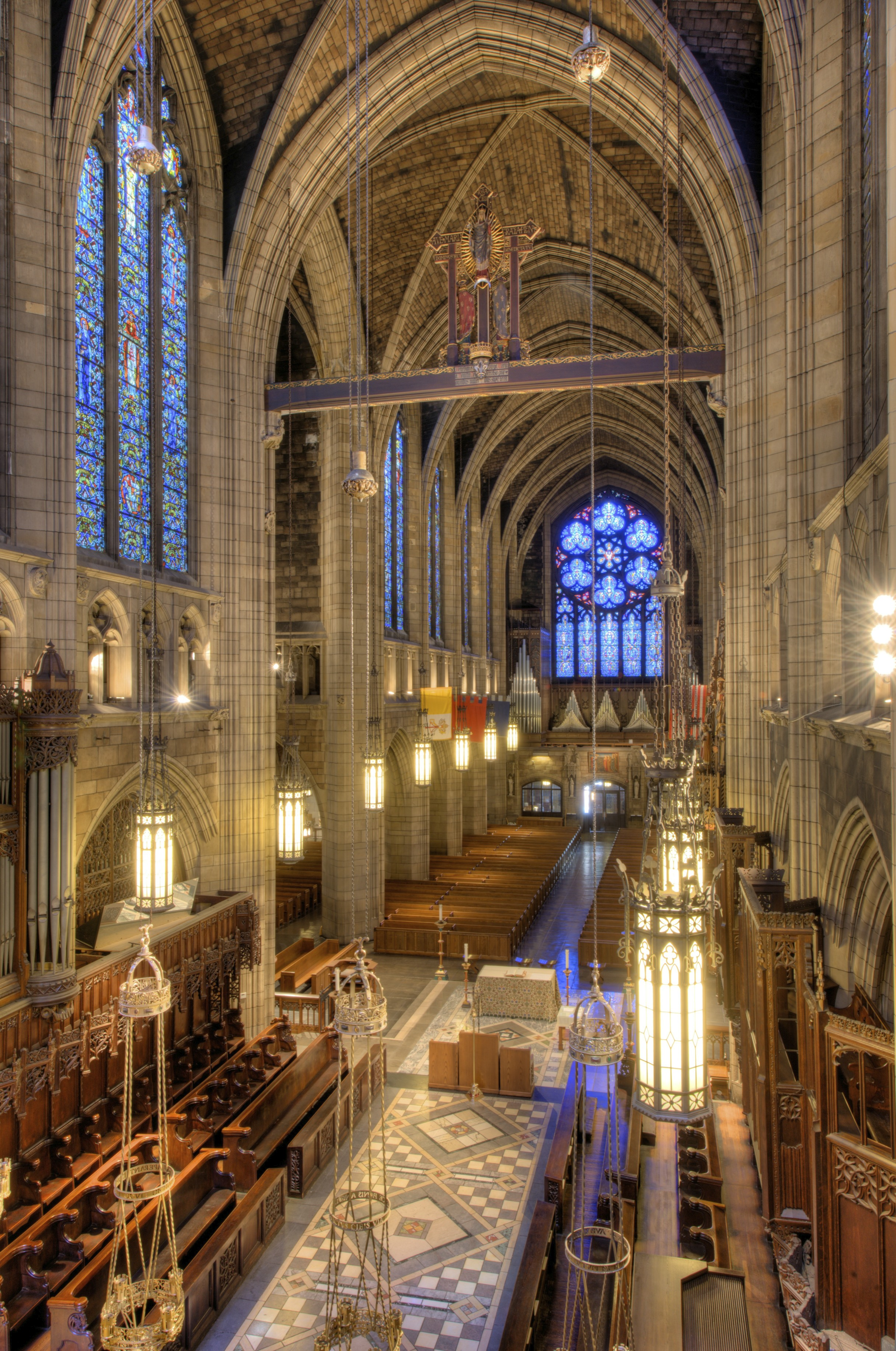
Triforium view of the church from the Altar

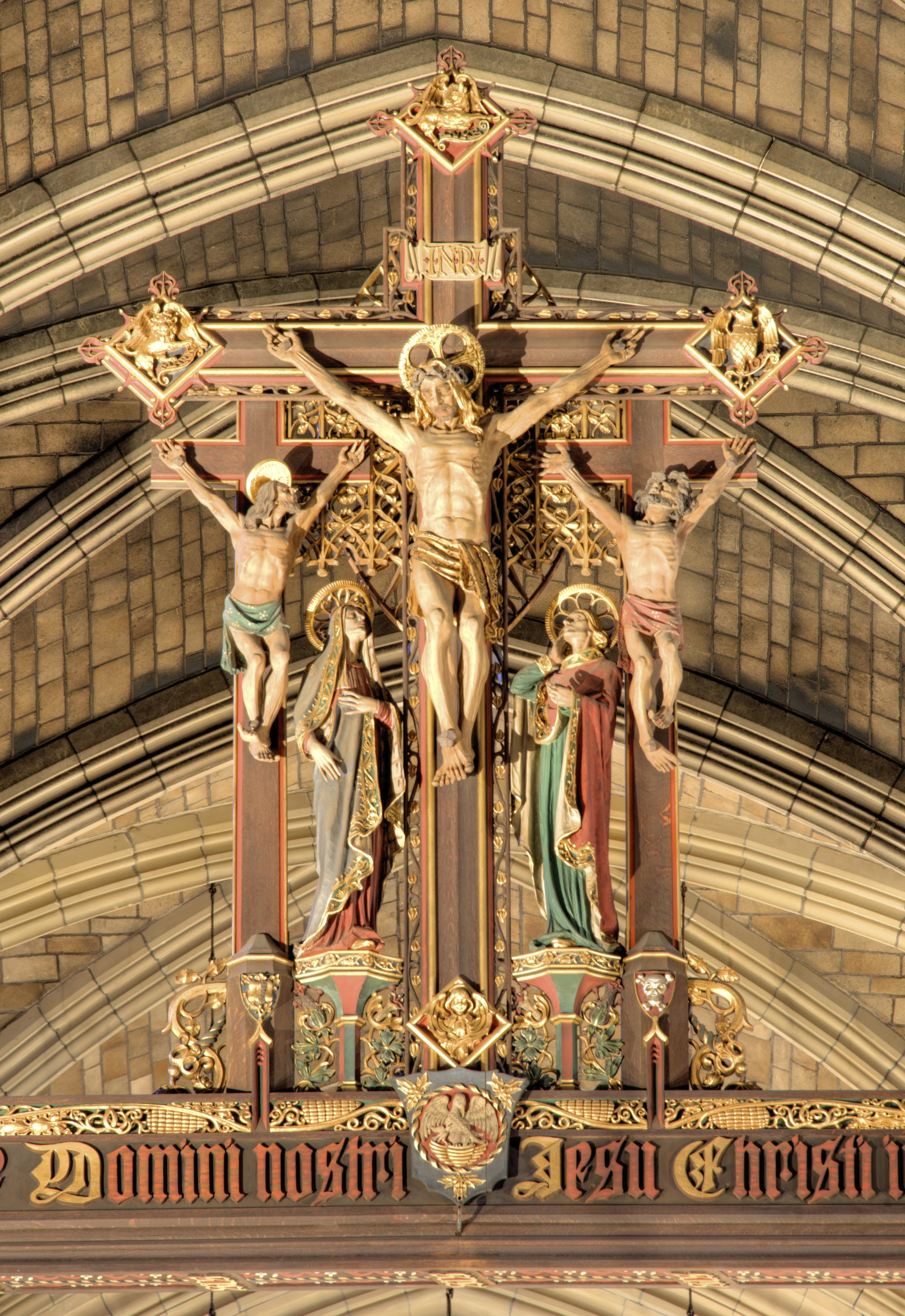
The elaborate rood

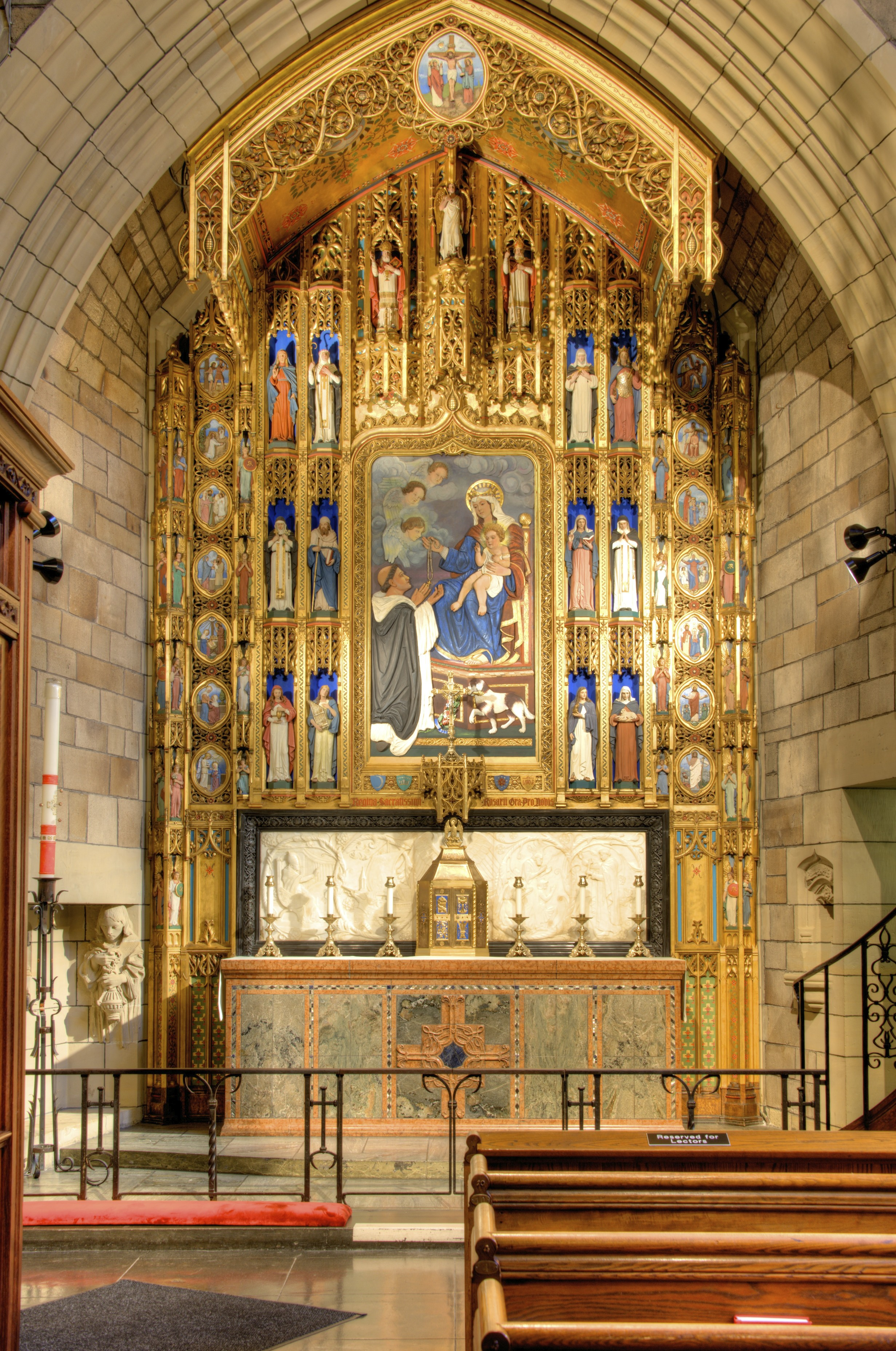
Rosary Chapel

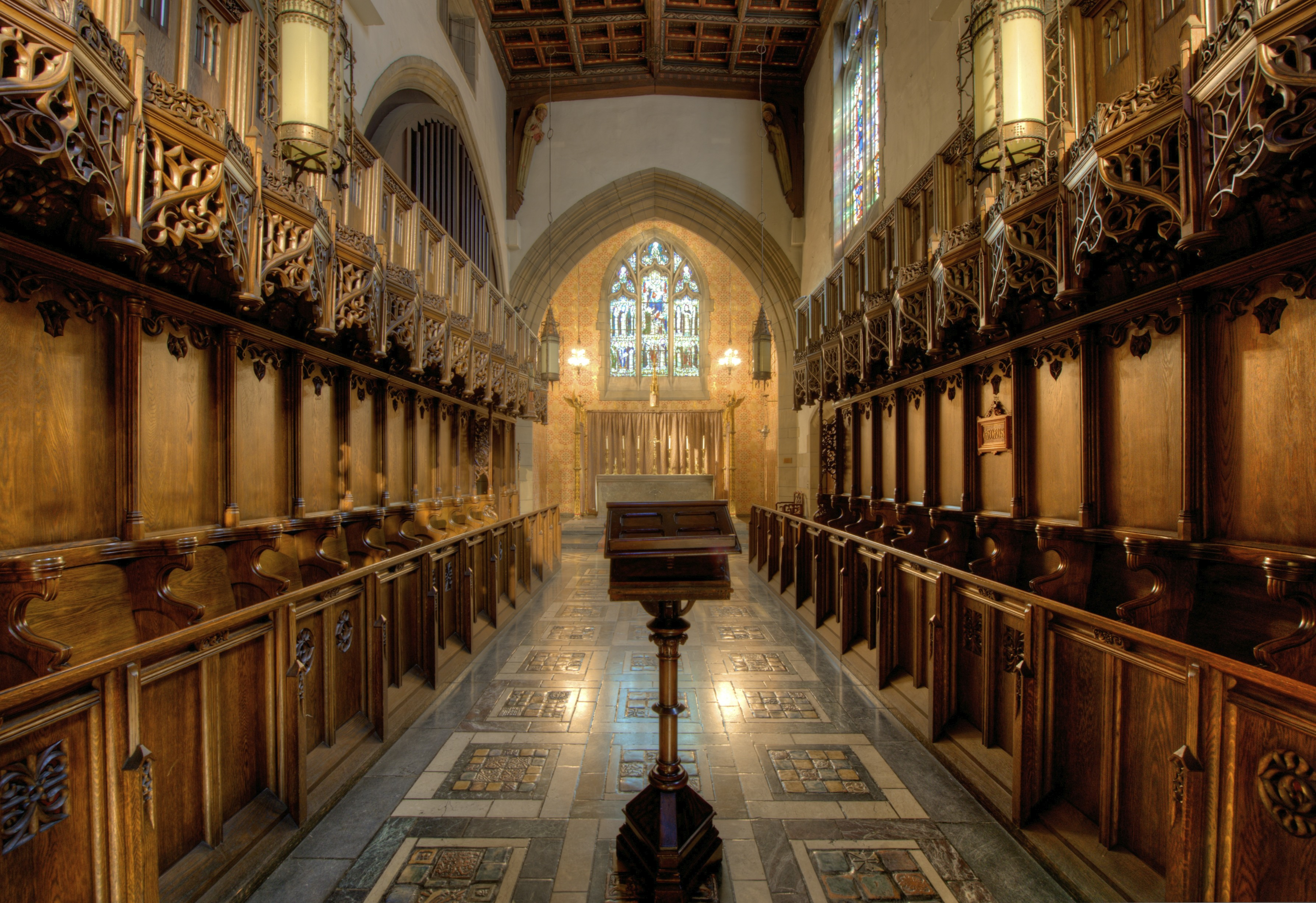
Friar's Chapel

== See also ==
- List of New York City Designated Landmarks in Manhattan from 59th to 110th Streets
- National Register of Historic Places listings in Manhattan from 59th to 110th Streets
