= Jack Donohue (director) =

American actor and director (1908–1984)

- Born: John Francis Donohue; November 3, 1908; New York City, U.S.
- Died: March 27, 1984 (aged 75); Marina del Rey, California, U.S.
- Occupations: Actor, choreographer, composer, dancer, director, producer, screenwriter
- Years active: 1927–80
- Spouses: Marilyn Miller (m. 1928, divorced) Tutta Rolf (m. 1936; div. 1950)
- Children: 1

John Francis Donohue (November 3, 1908 – March 27, 1984) was an American film actor, screenwriter, director, producer, composer, and choreographer.

Some of his movie directing roles include Babes in Toyland (1961), Marriage on the Rocks, (1965), and Assault on a Queen, (1966). Some of his television directing roles include The Frank Sinatra Show, The Colgate Comedy Hour, The Red Skelton Show, and The Dean Martin Show.

== Career ==
Donohue began his career in the 1920s as a dancer and choreographer for the Ziegfeld Follies. This all resulted when he broke his leg while working as an iron worker. Doctors suggested that he exercise, such as dancing, to strengthen his broken limbs. He did and started dancing with Ziegfeld in 1927. Shortly after his gig with Ziegfeld, he went on to dance in Vaudeville until the 1930s when he went to Hollywood.

During the 1930s and the 1940s, Donohue switched between Hollywood and Broadway. In Hollywood he taught Shirley Temple the "Hula" in her "Curly Top" film and also tap dancing in her film "Bright Eyes." In Broadway, some of his most memorable performances were as the choreographer of the musicals Top Banana and Mr. Wonderful.

He made his film directing debut in the 1948 movie Close-Up which was a well known film at the time because the whole film was shot entirely on location in New York City. He directed many other films throughout his career that spanned more than five decades.

He made his television directing debut on the 1950s variety program The Frank Sinatra Show. His directing got him closely associated with some of the biggest entertainers of the day such as Frank Sinatra, Dean Martin, and Red Skelton. Some of his most recent work in the years prior to his death in 1984 were those on Chico and the Man in the 70s and The Lucy Show and The Jim Nabors Hour.

He also had an acting career which consisted of only eleven acting credits.

== Personal life and death ==
Donohue married stage star Marilyn Miller in 1928. The date of their divorce remains uncertain.

Donohue met and married Norwegian actress Tutta Rolf in 1936. Rolf had been married once before to the Swedish actor Ernst Rolf who died in 1932. The year prior Tutta and Ernst gave birth to Ernst Rolf Jr. better known as the Swedish-American film editor Tom Rolf.

The two had a daughter of their own, actress Jill Donohue.

Rolf and Donohue divorced in 1950. Donohue died on March 27, 1984, of a heart attack in Marina del Rey at the age of 75. He was cremated thereafter.

== Filmography ==
=== As director ===
- Close-Up (1948)
- The Yellow Cab Man (1950)
- Watch the Birdie (1950)
- The Frank Sinatra Show (1950–1951, 29 episodes)
- The Revlon Mirror Theater (1953)
- Lucky Me (1954)
- That's My Boy (1954)
- The Colgate Comedy Hour (1954)
- Red Skelton Revue (1954, 8 episodes)
- The Red Skelton Show (1954–1955, 6 episodes)
- The George Gobel Show (1957)
- The Frank Sinatra Show (1957–1958, 19 episodes)
- Startime (1959–1960, 2 episodes)
- The Mickey Rooney Show (1960, TV movie)
- The Dinah Shore Chevy Show (1961)
- Babes in Toyland (1961)
- Margie (1961–1962, 4 episodes)
- Disneyland (1961–1969, 2 episodes)
- Follow the Sun (1962)
- The Lucy Show (1962–1968, 98 episodes)
- Vacation Playhouse (1963) (2 episodes of unused television pilots)
- Mr. and Mrs. (1964) (TV movie)
- Marriage on the Rocks (1965)
- Assault on a Queen (1966)
- Vacation Playhouse (1966)
- The Don Knotts Special (1967, TV special)
- Here's Lucy (1968–74, 11 episodes)
- The Odd Couple (1971–1975, 14 episodes)
- Anna and the King (1972)
- The Sandy Duncan Show (1972)
- The Paul Lynde Show (1972, 4 episodes)
- The Brady Bunch (1972–1973, 3 episodes)
- Love Thy Neighbor (1973)
- Happy Anniversary and Goodbye (1974, TV movie)
- Lucy Gets Lucky (1975, TV movie)
- Chico and the Man (1975–1978, 69 episodes)
- Miss Winslow and Son (1979)
- Wally Brown (1979)
- Sinatra: The First 40 Years (1980, TV movie)
- Lucy Moves to NBC (1980, TV movie)

=== As producer ===
- The Frank Sinatra Show (1950–1951, 24 episodes)
- The Colgate Comedy Hour (1954)
- The Red Skelton Show (1954–1955, 6 episodes)
- The George Gobel Show (1957)
- Startime (1959–1960, 2 episodes)
- The Mickey Rooney Show (1960, TV movie)
- The Lucy Show (1964–1965, 6 episodes)
- Vacation Playhouse (1966, 2 episodes)
- Dick Van Dyke Special (1967, TV movie)

=== As actor ===
- Our Little Girl (1935)
- Rhythm in the Air (1936)
- O.H.M.S. (1937)
- Variety Hour (1937)
- Ship's Concert (1937)
- Keep Smiling (1938)
- Babes in Toyland (1961)
- The Lucy Show (1962–1968)
- Here's Lucy (1968–1974)

=== As writer ===
- Suns o' Guns (1936)
- Rhythm in the Air (1936)
- Close-Up (1948)

=== As composer ===
- Lost in a Harem (1944)
- Neptune's Daughter (1949)
- Calamity Jane (1953)
