= Ruben McFall =

American trumpeter and jazz arranger (born 1931)

Reuben McFall (aka Ruben and Rubin and Ruban; born 1 Feb 1931 Los Angeles) is an American trumpeter and jazz arranger who performed as a sideman with Freddie Slack, Vido Musso, Floyd Ray, Roy Porter (from 1949 to 1950), Glen Henry, Lalo Guerrero, Stan Kenton (from 1952 to 1953), Gerry Mulligan, Woody Herman (from 1953 to 1955), Teddi King, and Gerald Wilson.

== Career ==
As sideman, performed with

- Freddie Slack
- Vido Musso
- Floyd Ray (né Floyd Edward Ray; 1909–1985)
- Roy Porter from 1949 to 1950
- Glen Henry (né Glenn Alba Henry, Jr. 1915–1993) Band in 1950, with Joe Maini on saxophone, Jimmy Knepper on trombone, and Bill Trujillo (né William Lee Trujillo; born 1930) on saxophone
- Lalo Guerrero — toured with his band from 1951 to 1952, with Lennie Niehaus on alto sax, Bill Trujillo on tenor, Frank Quijada (1917–1953) on drums, and Al León on piano
- Stan Kenton from 1952 to 1953 — McFall was a member of the band during a milestone in jazz, when Kenton's band recorded the first of 5 sessions in 9 days for Capitol in Chicago for the New Concepts of Artistry In Rhythm album.

Conte Candoli, Buddy Childers, Don Dennis (né Donald Duane Dennis; 1927–1995), and Maynard Ferguson were in the trumpet section
Bill Holman, Richie Kamuca were on tenor sax
Lee Konitz, Vinnie Dean (né Vincent N. DiVittorio; 1929–2010) on alto sax
Bill Russo, Bob Fitzpatrick (né Francis Steven Fitzpatrick; 1920–1995), Keith Moon (né Gordon Keith Moon; 1929–2006), George Roberts, and Frank Rosolino on trombone
Kenton directing and on piano, Derek Walton on percussion, Sal Salvador on guitar, Don Bagley on bass, Stan Levey on drums
Kay Brown singing

- Gerry Mulligan — see album compilation, Gerry Mulligan: The Quintessence/New York Los Angeles Paris 1946-1955

Recording sessions: March 21, 1946 to October 31, 1955

1. Chicago
2. Los Angeles
3. New York
4. Paris
5. San Diego
6. Stockton
- Woody Herman from 1953 to 1955, for whom he composed and arranged "Mambo the Most"
- Teddi King, at the Newport Jazz Festival in 1955
- Gerald Wilson — McFall is featured as trumpet soloist on a recording of "La Virgen de la Macarena," arranged by Wilson and recorded in 1954 with Wilson's big band
- Shorty Rogers Big Band

Jazz discography, sessions, transcribed broadcasts, recorded concerts

- 3 with Roy Porter and His Orchestra from 1949 to 1950
- 59 with Stan Kenton from 1952 to 1953
- 1 with Shorty Rogers and His Big Band in 1953
- 13 with Woody Herman from 1953 to 1955
- 1 with Teddi King 1955, Newport Jazz Festival

== Selected discography ==
As sideman

With Stan Kenton

- Popular Favorites by Stan Kenton (Capitol, 1953)
- Sketches on Standards (Capitol, 1953)
- This Modern World (Capitol, 1953)
- The Kenton Era (Capitol, 1940–54, [1955])
- Dodo Marmarosa, Lorraine Geller, West Coast Piano Touch (1992)

Norma Japan – NLP 5011, Vantage Records (2) – NLP 5011
McFall on side B only
B1 thru B4 recorded July 7, 1953, live, Rendezvous Ballroom, Newport Beach, California
B1: "Sometimes I'm Happy"
B2: "Buzzy"
B3: "How High The Moon"
B4: "Short Stop"
Personnel: Herb Geller, alto sax; Bill Perkins, Jack Montrose, tenor saxes; Bill Holman, bari sax; Bob Edmondson, Bob Enevoldsen, Herbie Harper, trombones; Conrad Gozzo, Don Dennis, Maynard Ferguson, Ruben McFall, Shorty Rogers, trumpets; Lorraine Geller, piano; John Simons, acoustic bass; Chuck Flores, drums

- Shorty Rogers Big Band, Live at the Rendezvous Ballroom, Newport Beach, California; OCLC 33018185, 812798198

Recorded July 11, 1953, Rendezvous Ballroom
Personnel: Herb Geller, Bill Perkins, Jack Montrose, Bill Holman, saxophones; Bob Enevoldsen, Bob Edmondson, Herbie Harper, trombones; Maynard Ferguson, Conrad Gozzo, Ruban McFall, Don Dennis, trumpets; Lorraine Geller, piano; John Simmons, bass; Chuck Flores, drums

== Selected compositions and arrangements ==
- "Bobby's Mambo"
- "Mambo the Most, Part 1"
- "Mambo the Most, Part 2"
- "Mambo the Utmost"
- "Mambo a la Stockholm"

== Education ==
McFall grew up in the Belvedere neighborhood of East Los Angeles, California, long established as a Mexican-American enclave. In the 1940 and 1942 Los Angeles Voter Registration directory, Ruben's father, Ernest VanSant McFall (1887–1957), was listed a musician.

McFall attended Westlake College of Music in Hollywood, California, one of the first institutions in the county to offer a diploma in jazz. The school was founded in 1945 and ran until 1961. In Los Angeles, during the early 1950s, his friends included trumpeter Donald Roy Fromknecht, Jr. (1928–2012).
