= Rendezvous with Kenton =

Studio album by Stan Kenton
- Released: 1957
- Recorded: October 7, 8, 9 & 10, 1957; Rendezvous Ballroom, Balboa, CA
- Genre: Jazz
- Label: Capitol T/ST 932
- Producer: Lee Gillette

Stan Kenton chronology
Kenton with Voices (1957)	Rendezvous with Kenton (1957)	Back to Balboa (1957)

Rendezvous with Kenton is an album by bandleader and pianist Stan Kenton featuring performances recorded at the Rendezvous Ballroom in 1957 and released on the Capitol label.

== Reception ==
Professional ratings
Review scores
Source	Rating
Allmusic	2/5 stars
Disc	3.5/5 stars

The Allmusic review by Scott Yanow noted "The music is pleasant but not up to the fiery level one would expect of the Stan Kenton Orchestra".

== Track listing ==
1. "With the Wind and the Rain in Your Hair"(Jack Lawrence, Clara Edwards) - 2:02
2. "Memories of You" (Eubie Blake, Andy Razaf) - 2:34
3. "These Things You Left Me" (Harold Dickinson, Sidney Lippman) - 2:05
4. "Two Shades of Autumn" (Joe Coccia) - 3:53
5. "They Didn't Believe Me" (Jerome Kern, Herbert Reynolds) - 1:53
6. "Walkin' by the River" (Robert Sour, Una Mae Carlisle) - 2:53
7. "High on a Windy Hill" (Alex Kramer, Joan Whitney) - 2:07
8. "Love Letters" (Victor Young, Edward Heyman) - 2:24
9. "I Get Along Without You Very Well" (Hoagy Carmichael) - 1:55
10. "Desiderata" (Coccia) - 3:09
11. "This is No Laughing Matter" (Al Frisch, Buddy Kaye) - 3:29
12. "I See Your Face Before Me" (Arthur Schwartz, Howard Dietz) - 2:02
- Recorded at the Rendezvous Ballroom in Balboa, CA on October 7, 1957 (tracks 2, 3 & 12), October 8, 1957 (tracks 1, 4, 6 & 8–10), October 9, 1957 (tracks 7 & 11) and October 10, 1957 (track 5).

== Personnel ==
- Stan Kenton - piano, conductor
- Billy Catalano, Phil Gilbert, Lee Katzman, Ed Leddy, Sam Noto - trumpet
- Jim Amlotte, Kent Larsen, Archie Le Coque, Don Reed, - trombone
- Ken Shroyer - bass trombone
- Lennie Niehaus, Bill Robinson - alto saxophone
- Wayne Dunstan, Bill Perkins - tenor saxophone
- Steve Perlow - baritone saxophone, alto saxophone
- Red Kelly - bass
- Jerry McKenzie - drums
- Joe Coccia - arranger
