= Sketches on Standards =

Studio album by Stan Kenton
- Released: 1953
- Recorded: January 28 & 30, 1953
- Studio: Capitol Recording Studios, Melrose Avenue, Hollywood, CA
- Genre: Jazz
- Label: Capitol H 426
- Producer: Lee Gillette

Stan Kenton chronology
Popular Favorites by Stan Kenton (1953)	Sketches on Standards (1953)	This Modern World (1953)

Sketches on Standards (subtitled Request selections from the Kenton Dance Library) is an album by pianist and bandleader Stan Kenton featuring performances of jazz standards recorded in 1953 and originally released on the Capitol label as a 10-inch LP.

== Critical reception ==
Professional ratings
Review scores
Source	Rating
Allmusic	3/5 stars

The Allmusic review by Scott Yanow noted "although these concise interpretations are not essential, the music is quite pleasing". On All About Jazz Jack Bowers said "One can’t help noticing that, unlike many of today’s inseparable clones, Kenton’s soloists — most of them, anyway — are almost instantly identifiable. No one, for example, would mistake Konitz, Candoli, Rosolino or Kamuca for anyone else, and their resourceful improvisations sound as fresh today as they did half a century ago".

== Track listing ==
1. "Sophisticated Lady" (Duke Ellington, Irving Mills, Mitchell Parish) – 3:19
2. "Begin the Beguine" (Cole Porter) – 3:04
3. "Lover Man (Oh, Where Can You Be?)" (Jimmy Davis, James Sherman, Ram Ramirez) – 2:50
4. "Pennies from Heaven" (Arthur Johnston, Johnny Burke) – 3:00
5. "Over the Rainbow" (Harold Arlen, Yip Harburg) – 3:05
6. "Fascinating Rhythm" (George Gershwin, Ira Gershwin) – 2:46
7. "There's a Small Hotel" (Richard Rodgers, Lorenz Hart) – 2:43
8. "Shadow Waltz" (Al Dubin, Harry Warren) – 2:37
9. "Harlem Nocturne" (Earle Hagen) – 3:06 *bonus track on CD
10. "Stella By Starlight" (Victor Young – Ned Washington) – 3:18 *bonus track on CD
11. "Dark Eyes" (Traditional) – (2:12) – *bonus track on CD
12. "Malaguena" (Ernesto Lecuona) –(2:31) – *bonus track on CD
13. "Spring is Here" (Rodgers and Hart) (3:19) – *bonus track on CD
14. "I'm Glad There Is You (F. Madeira J. Dorsey) (4:14) – *bonus track on CD

== Personnel ==
- Stan Kenton – piano, conductor
- Conte Candoli, Buddy Childers, Don Dennis, Maynard Ferguson, Ruben McFall – trumpet
- Bob Burgess, Keith Moon, Frank Rosolino, Bill Russo – trombone
- George Roberts – bass trombone
- Vinnie Dean, Lee Konitz – alto saxophone
- Bill Holman, Richie Kamuca – tenor saxophone
- Bob Gioga – baritone saxophone
- Sal Salvador – guitar
- Don Bagley – bass
- Stan Levey – drums
- Stan Kenton (track 2), Lennie Niehaus (track 4), Bill Russo (tracks 1, 3 & 5–8) – arranger
