= The Ballad Style of Stan Kenton =

Studio album by Stan Kenton
- Released: 1958
- Recorded: May 19 and June 6 & 23, 1958
- Studio: Capitol (Hollywood)
- Genre: Jazz
- Length: 41:55
- Label: Capitol ST 1068
- Producer: Lee Gillette

Stan Kenton chronology
Back to Balboa (1958)	The Ballad Style of Stan Kenton (1958)	Lush Interlude (1958)

The Ballad Style of Stan Kenton is an album by bandleader and pianist Stan Kenton featuring performances recorded in 1958 and released on the Capitol label.

== Reception ==
Professional ratings
Review scores
Source	Rating
Allmusic	3/5 stars
The Penguin Guide to Jazz Recordings	3/4 stars

The Allmusic review by Scott Yanow noted "The Ballad Style of Stan Kenton is an unusual set, for other than some muted trumpet, Kenton's melodic piano is the only soloist. The 13 ballads (a dozen standards and a band original) are given restrained treatments which hint at the band's power without overtly expressing it, and the music is both romantic and danceable. An underrated set".

== Track listing ==
1. "Then I'll Be Tired of You" (Arthur Schwartz, Yip Harburg) - 3:06
2. "More Than You Know" (Vincent Youmans, Edward Eliscu, Billy Rose) - 3:21
3. "When Stars Looked Down" (Dale Barnhart) - 3:42
4. "The End of a Love Affair" (Edward Redding) - 2:51
5. "A Sunday Kind of Love" (Barbara Belle, Anita Leonard, Louis Prima, Stan Rhodes) - 3:33
6. "Moon Song" (Arthur Johnston, Sam Coslow) - 3:11
7. "Early Autumn" (Ralph Burns, Woody Herman, Johnny Mercer) - 3:33
8. "How Am I to Know?" (Jack King, Dorothy Parker) - 3:27
9. "The Things We Did Last Summer" (Jule Styne, Sammy Cahn) - 3:18
10. "We'll Be Together Again" (Carl T. Fischer, Frankie Laine) - 3:09
11. "How Deep Is the Ocean?" (Irving Berlin) - 3:12
12. "The Night We Called It a Day" (Matt Dennis, Tom Adair) - 2:41
13. "Ill Wind" (Harold Arlen, Ted Koehler) - 2:51 Bonus track on CD reissue
- Recorded at Capitol Studios in Hollywood, CA on May 19, 1958 (tracks 2, 7 & 12), June 6, 1958 (tracks 1, 4, 6, 8, 10 & 11) and June 23, 1958 (tracks 3, 5, 9 & 13).

== Personnel ==
- Stan Kenton - piano, conductor, arranger
- Billy Catalano (tracks 1, 2, 7, 10 & 12), Jules Chaikin, Phil Gilbert, Don Fagerquist (tracks 1, 4, 6, 8, 10 & 11), Lee Katzman (tracks 2, 3, 5, 7, 9, 12 & 13), Ed Leddy (tracks 3–6, 8, 9, 11 & 13) - trumpet
- Jim Amlotte, Bob Fitzpatrick (tracks 1, 3–6, 8–11 & 13), Kent Larsen, Archie Le Coque, Don Reed (tracks: 2, 7 & 12) - trombone
- Ken Shroyer - bass trombone (tracks 1, 3, 5, 7, 9, 12 & 13)
- Lennie Niehaus - alto saxophone
- Richie Kamuca, Bill Perkins - tenor saxophone
- Steve Perlow, Bill Robinson - baritone saxophone
- Red Kelly - bass
- Jerry McKenzie (tracks 1, 3–6, 8–11 & 13), Mel Lewis (tracks 2, 7 & 12) - drums
