= The Stage Door Swings =

Studio album by Stan Kenton
- Released: 1959
- Recorded: September 22, 1958
- Studio: Riverside Plaza Hotel, NYC
- Genre: Jazz
- Length: 32:22
- Label: Capitol ST 1166
- Producer: Lee Gillette

Stan Kenton chronology
Lush Interlude (1958)	The Stage Door Swings (1959)	The Kenton Touch (1958)

The Stage Door Swings is an album by bandleader and pianist Stan Kenton featuring performances of Broadway musical tunes recorded in 1958 and released on the Capitol label.

== Reception ==
Professional ratings
Review scores
Source	Rating
Allmusic	3.5/5 stars

The Allmusic review by John Bush noted "Kenton's band of 1958 didn't boast the firepower of earlier editions, but new arrivals Jack Sheldon and Bill Trujillo contribute a lot".

== Track listing ==
1. "Lullaby of Broadway" (Harry Warren, Al Dubin) - 2:42
2. "The Party's Over" (Jule Styne, Betty Comden, Adolph Green) - 2:58
3. "Baubles, Bangles, & Beads" (Robert Wright, George Forrest) - 2:45
4. "Ev'ry Time We Say Goodbye" (Cole Porter) - 3:18
5. "Whatever Lola Wants" (Richard Adler, Jerry Ross) - 2:29
6. "Bali Ha'i" (Richard Rodgers, Oscar Hammerstein II) - 2:05
7. "Hey There" (Adler, Ross) - 2:32
8. "Younger Than Springtime" (Rodgers, Hammerstein) - 3:00
9. "On the Street Where You Live" (Frederick Loewe, Alan Jay Lerner) - 2:12
10. "I Love Paris" (Porter) - 2:28
11. "I've Never Been in Love Before" (Frank Loesser) - 3:14
12. "All at Once You Love Her" (Rodgers, Hammerstein) - 2:39

== Personnel ==
- Stan Kenton - piano, conductor,
- Bud Brisbois, Billy Catalano, Frank Huggins, Jack Sheldon, Al Sunseri - trumpet
- Jim Amlotte, Kent Larsen, Archie Le Coque - trombone
- Bob Olson, Bill Smiley - bass trombone
- Lennie Niehaus - alto saxophone, arranger
- Bill Perkins, Bill Trujillo - tenor saxophone
- Steve Perlow, Bill Robinson - baritone saxophone
- Red Kelly- bass
- Jerry McKenzie - drums
