= The Kenton Touch =

Studio album by Stan Kenton
- Released: 1959
- Recorded: December 22–23, 1958
- Studio: Capitol (Hollywood)
- Genre: Jazz
- Label: Capitol ST 1276
- Producer: Lee Gillette

Stan Kenton chronology
The Stage Door Swings (1958)	The Kenton Touch (1959)	Kenton Live from the Las Vegas Tropicana (1959)

The Kenton Touch (subtitled Portraits in Strings) is an album by bandleader and pianist Stan Kenton featuring a string section. As with his previous album Lush Interlude, the trumpet and sax sections were omitted and Bud Shank's flute and alto sax is the only woodwind used. It was recorded in 1958 and released on the Capitol label.

== Reception ==
Professional ratings
Review scores
Source	Rating
Allmusic	1.5/5 stars
DownBeat	1.5/5 stars

The Allmusic review by Ron Wynn noted "A 1958 Kenton album that's pretty straightforward and less ambitious than many during that period. The arrangements are standard, the brass section plays with more restraint and less volume, and it's among his best conventional jazz releases".

== Track listing ==
All compositions by Stan Kenton and Pete Rugolo except where noted.

1. "Salute" (Rugolo) - 3:52
2. "Monotony" - 3:41
3. "Elegy for Alto" - 3:34
4. "Theme for Sunday" (Kenton) - 5:16
5. "Ballade for Drums" (Rugolo) - 3:09
6. "Minor Riff" - 3:28
7. "The End of the World (Early Duke)" (Rugolo, Steve Allen) - 2:27
8. "Opus in Chartreuse" (Gene Roland) - 3:23
9. "Painted Rhythm" (Kenton) - 5:14
10. "A Rose for David" (Rugolo) - 2:42
- Recorded at Capitol Studios in Hollywood, CA on December 22, 1958 (tracks 3–5 & 7–10) and December 23, 1958 (tracks 1, 2 & 6).

== Personnel ==
- Stan Kenton - piano, conductor
- Milt Bernhart, Kent Larsen, Archie Le Coque - trombone
- Bob Olson, Bill Smiley - bass trombone
- Bud Shank - flute, alto flute, alto saxophone
- Laurindo Almeida - guitar
- Red Kelly, Red Mitchell - bass
- Milt Holland (tracks 3, 4, 8 & 10), Shelly Manne (tracks 1, 2, 5–7 & 9) - drums
- Larry Bunker - percussion
- Israel Baker, Harold Dicterow (tracks 3–5 & 7–10), David Frisina, James Getzoff (tracks 3–5 & 7–10), Ben Gill, Dan Lube (tracks 1, 2 & 6), Alfred Lustgarten, Erno Neufeld (tracks 1, 2 & 6), Lou Raderman (tracks 1, 2 & 6), Nathan Ross, Eudice Shapiro, Felix Slatkin, Paul Shure (tracks 3–5 & 7–10), Marshall Sosson, Gerald Vinci - violin
- Sam Boghossian (tracks 1, 2 & 6), Alvin Dinkin (tracks 3–5 & 7–10), Virginia Majewski, Paul Robyn, David Sterkin - viola
- David Fillerman (tracks 1, 2 & 6), Victor Gottlieb (tracks 1, 2 & 6), Armand Kaproff (tracks 3–5 & 7–10). Edgar Lustgarten, Kurt Reher (tracks 3-5 & 7–10, Eleanor Slatkin - cello
- Pete Rugolo - arranger
