= Kenton / Wagner =

Studio album by Stan Kenton
- Released: 1964
- Recorded: September 16, 17, 18 & 24, 1964
- Studio: Capitol (Hollywood)
- Genre: Jazz
- Label: Capitol TAO 2217
- Producer: Lee Gillette

Stan Kenton chronology
Stan Kenton / Jean Turner (1963)	Kenton / Wagner (1964)	Stan Kenton Conducts the Los Angeles Neophonic Orchestra (1965)

Kenton / Wagner is an album by the Stan Kenton Orchestra performing jazz arrangements of Richard Wagner's compositions recorded in 1964 and released by Capitol Records.

== Reception ==
Professional ratings
Review scores
Source	Rating
Allmusic	4.5/5 stars

The Allmusic review by Scott Yanow noted "Somehow Kenton turns Wagner's music into jazz, capturing the intense emotion, pomposity and drama with daring ideas. Not for all tastes, this LP was one of Stan Kenton's last innovative recordings".

== Track listing ==
All compositions by Richard Wagner.

1. "Ride of the Valkyries from "Die Walküre"" - 3:17
2. "Siegfried's Funeral March from "Götterdämmerung"" - 7:44
3. "Prelude to Act I of "Lohengrin"" - 6:11
4. "Prelude to Act III of "Lohengrin" - 3:12
5. "Prelude to "Tristan Und Isolde"" - 6:55
6. "Love-Death from "Tristan Und Isolde"" - 6:18
7. "Wedding March from "Lohengrin"" - 2:36
8. "Pilgrims' Chorus from "Tannhaeuser"" - 3:54
- Recorded at Capitol Studios in Hollywood, CA on September 16, 1964 (track 6), September 17, 1964 (tracks 1 & 2), September 18, 1964 (tracks 3 & 5) and September 24, 1964 (tracks 4, 7 & 8).

== Personnel ==
- Stan Kenton - piano, arranger, conductor
- Bud Brisbois, Bobby Bryant, Conte Candoli, Ronnie Ossa, Dalton Smith - trumpet
- Bob Fitzpatrick, John Halliburton (tracks 1–5, 7 & 8), Kent Larsen, Tommy Shepard (track 6) - trombone
- Jim Amlotte - bass trombone
- John Cave, Vincent DeRosa, Bill Hinshaw, Arthur Maebe, Dick Perissi - French horn
- Clive Acker - tuba
- Gabe Baltazar (track 6), Lennie Niehaus (tracks 1–5, 7 & 8) - alto saxophone
- Buddy Collette (tracks 1, 2 & 6), Bob Hardaway (tracks 3–5, 7 & 8), Bill Perkins - tenor saxophone
- Jack Nimitz - baritone saxophone
- Chuck Gentry - bass saxophone
- Don Bagley (tracks 3–8), Joe Comfort (tracks 1 & 2) - bass
- Irving Cottler - drums
- Frank Carlson - timpani, bongos
