= Back to Balboa =

Studio album by Stan Kenton
- Released: 1958
- Recorded: January 20 & 21, 1958; Rendezvous Ballroom, Balboa, CA
- Genre: Jazz
- Label: Capitol T/ST 995
- Producer: Lee Gillette

Stan Kenton chronology
Rendezvous with Kenton (1957)	Back to Balboa (1958)	The Ballad Style of Stan Kenton (1958)

Back to Balboa is an album by bandleader and pianist Stan Kenton featuring performances recorded at the Rendezvous Ballroom in 1958 and released on the Capitol label.

The liner notes for the original LP release stated: "It was late in 1957 that the Rendezvous became home base for the Kenton orchestra. Balboa offered the stimulating surroundings; the Rendezvous offered a location spot between tours and incomparable acoustical properties."

"The body of sound, and the crystal clear overtones achieved in this album, is attributed to the orchestra's blowing over a block-long polished dance floor and reverberating from the great arched wooden ceiling. The effect, without the use of echo chambers or electronic magic, is one which seemingly places the listener within the walls of the pastel hall."

== Reception ==
Professional ratings
Review scores
Source	Rating
Down Beat	4/5 stars
Allmusic	3/5 stars

Down Beat critic Don Gold wrote in his July 10, 1958 review that "Kenton, in describing Holman's "Royal Blue" in the notes, terms it exciting, powerful, and positive. He could have been describing this band."

Gold goes on to say: "In Perkins, Kamuca, Niehaus, Noto and Katzman, Kenton has several key soloists. Most of the charts in this LP are by Johnny Richards; at his best. Other charts, by Marty Paich and Holman, take advantage of the orchestra's capabilities, too. The vivid over-all Kenton sound is precisely executed. This is an important orchestra."

The Allmusic review by Scott Yanow noted " The 1958 Kenton big band had several excellent soloists... Well-played if not quite essential music".

== Track listing ==
1. "The Big Chase" (Marty Paich) - 4:12
2. "Rendezvous at Sunset" (Johnny Richards) - 4:16
3. "Speak Low" (Kurt Weill, Ogden Nash) - 3:28
4. "My Old Flame" (Arthur Johnston, Sam Coslow) - 4:03
5. "Out of This World" (Harold Arlen, Johnny Mercer) - 5:44
6. "Begin the Beguine" (Cole Porter) - 3:43
7. "Get Out of Town" (Porter) - 2:38
8. "Royal Blue" (Bill Holman) - 5:52
9. "I Concentrate on You" (Porter) - 3:22
10. "Beyond the Blue Horizon" (Leo Robin, Richard A. Whiting, W. Franke Harling) - 3:37

tracks 1 & 4 arranged by Marty Paich; tracks 2, 3, 5, 6, 7 and 9–14 arranged by Johnny Richards; track 8 arranged by Bill Holman

- Recorded at the Rendezvous Ballroom in Balboa, CA on January 20, 1958 (tracks 1, 2, 4, 8 & 9), January 21, 1958 (tracks 3, 5–7 & 10) and October 10, 1957, tracks 11–14

== Personnel ==
- Stan Kenton - piano, conductor
- Billy Catalano, Jules Chaiken, Phil Gilbert, Lee Katzman, Sam Noto - trumpet
- Jim Amlotte, Kent Larsen, Bob Fitzpatrick, Archie Le Coque - trombone
- Ken Shroyer - bass trombone
- Jim Decker, Vince De Rosa - French horn
- Lennie Niehaus - alto saxophone
- Bill Robinson - alto saxophone, baritone saxophone
- Richie Kamuca, Bill Perkins - tenor saxophone
- Steve Perlow - baritone saxophone
- Red Kelly - bass
- Jerry McKenzie - drums
