= Artistry in Voices and Brass =

Studio album by Stan Kenton
- Released: 1964
- Recorded: April 19 and September 10, 1963
- Studio: Capitol (Hollywood)
- Genre: Jazz
- Length: 37:00
- Label: Capitol T/ST 2132
- Producer: Lee Gillette

Stan Kenton chronology
Artistry in Bossa Nova (1963)	Artistry in Voices and Brass (1964)	Stan Kenton / Jean Turner (1963)

Artistry in Voices and Brass is an album by the Stan Kenton Orchestra revisiting their popular compositions with new lyrics composed by Milt Raskin and arranged by Pete Rugolo for an 18-member vocal chorus and trombone section recorded in 1963 and released by Capitol Records.

== Reception ==
Professional ratings
Review scores
Source	Rating
Allmusic	3/5 stars
Record Mirror	3/5 stars

The Allmusic review by Lindsay Planer noted "the results are predictably mixed. ...This proves the old adages that sometimes newer [read: more modern] isn't always better, and too many cooks do indeed spoil the proverbial sonic stew".

== Track listing ==
All compositions by Stan Kenton and Milt Raskin except where noted.

1. "Flame" (Rugolo, Raskin) - 2:17
2. "Moonlove" (Kenton, Rogolo, Raskin) - 4:26
3. "Painted Rhythm" - 3:27
4. "These Wonderful Things" - 3:30
5. "Eager Beaver" - 2:25
6. "Daydreams in the Night" - 2:32
7. "Concerto (Of Love)" - 5:38
8. "Solitaire" (Bill Russo, Kenton, Raskin) - 3:54
9. "It's Love" - 3:15
10. "Night Song" - 2:21
- Recorded at Capitol Studios in Hollywood, CA on April 19, 1963 (tracks 4–6) and September 10, 1963 (tracks 1–3 & 7–10).

== Personnel ==
- Stan Kenton - piano
- Edwin "Buddy" Baker (tracks 1–3 & 7–10), Milt Bernhart (tracks 4–6), Bob Curnow (tracks 1–3 & 7–10), Bob Fitzpatrick (tracks 4–6), Kent Larsen (tracks 4–6), Jiggs Whigham (tracks 1–3 & 7–10) - trombone
- Jim Amlotte - bass trombone
- Dave Wheeler - bass trombone, tuba
- Milt Raskin - piano (tracks 4 & 6)
- Laurindo Almeida - guitar
- Don Bagley (tracks 4–6), John Worster (tracks 1–3 & 7–10) - bass
- Dee Barton - drums
- Larry Bunker - percussion
- Jacqueline Allen (tracks 4–6), Sue Allen, Betty Jane Baker, Earl Brown (tracks 1–3 & 7–10), Evangeline Carmichael, Peggy Clark, William Cole, Allan Davies, Jimmy Joyce, Thomas Kenny (tracks 4–6), Bill Lee, Virginia Mancini (tracks 1–3 & 7–10), Jay Meyer, Loulie Jean Norman, Bernie Parke, Thurl Ravenscroft (tracks 1–3 & 7–10), Charles Schrouder (tracks 4–6), William Stafford (tracks 4–6), Sally Sweetland, George Aliceson Tipton (tracks 1–3 & 7–10), Gloria Wood - vocal chorus
- Pete Rugolo - arranger, conductor
