= The World We Know (Stan Kenton album) =

Studio album by Stan Kenton and His Orchestra
- Released: 1967
- Recorded: October 2–4, 1967
- Studio: Capitol (Hollywood)
- Genre: Jazz
- Length: 38:07
- Label: Capitol T/ST 2810
- Producer: Lee Gillette

Stan Kenton chronology
Stan Kenton Plays for Today (1966)	The World We Know (1967)	The Jazz Compositions of Dee Barton (1967)

The World We Know is an album by bandleader Stan Kenton recorded in 1967 by Capitol Records.

== Reception ==
The Allmusic review by Lindsay Planer says "Combining divergent reworkings of pop music standards with his own undeniably unique originals, Kenton applies his trademark intricate and individual harmonic phrasings. The consistent results bear out his ability to augment his highly stylized arrangements within a framework of familiarity... While enthusiasts of the artist's work will undoubtedly be impressed, to modern ears the easy listening orchestration may seem heavy-handed, if not lackluster".

== Track listing ==
All compositions by Stan Kenton except where noted.

1. "Sunny" (Bobby Hebb) – 3:01
2. "Imagine" (Francis Lai, Sammy Cahn) – 3:00
3. "A Man and a Woman" (Lai, Cahn) – 4:43
4. "Theme for Jo" – 3:30
5. "Interchange" – 3:02
6. "Invitation" (Bronisław Kaper, Paul Francis Webster) – 3:18
7. "Girl Talk" (Neal Hefti, Bobby Troup) – 4:22
8. "The World We Know" (Bert Kaempfert, Herbert Rehbein, Carl Sigman) – 2:24
9. "This Hotel" (Johnny Keating, Richard Quine) – 2:32
10. "Changing Times" – 3:28
11. "Gloomy Sunday" (Rezső Seress, László Jávor, Sam M. Lewis) – 4:47
- Recorded at Capitol Studios in Hollywood, CA on October 2, 1967 (tracks 4 & 9), October 3, 1967 (tracks 1, 6, 7 & 11) and October 4, 1967 (tracks 2, 3, 5 & 8 & 10).

== Personnel ==
- Stan Kenton – piano, conductor, arranger
- Jay Daversa, Jack Laubach, Carl Leach, Clyde Raesinger, Dalton Smith – trumpet
- Tom Senff, Dick Shearer, Tom Whittaker – trombone
- Jim Amlotte – bass trombone
- Graham Ellis – bass trombone, tuba
- Ray Reed – alto saxophone, piccolo
- Bob Dahl, Alan Rowe – tenor saxophone
- John Mitchell – baritone saxophone
- Bill Fritz – baritone saxophone, bass saxophone, flute
- Don Bagley (tracks 1, 4, 6, 7, 9 & 11), Monty Budwig (tracks 2, 3, 5 & 8 & 10) – bass
- Dee Barton – drums, arranger
- Adolpho "Chino" Valdez – bongos, congas
