= Adventures in Time =

Studio album by Stan Kenton
- Released: 1962
- Recorded: September 24–28, 1962
- Studio: Capitol (Hollywood)
- Genre: Jazz
- Length: 38:15
- Label: Capitol T/ST 1844
- Producer: Lee Gillette

Stan Kenton chronology
Stan Kenton! Tex Ritter! (1962)	Adventures in Time (1962)	Artistry in Bossa Nova (1963)

Adventures in Time (subtitle A Concerto for Orchestra arranged by Johnny Richards) is an album by the Stan Kenton Orchestra featuring compositions by Johnny Richards recorded in 1962 and released by Capitol Records.

== Reception ==
Professional ratings
Review scores
Source	Rating
Allmusic	3.5/5 stars
The Penguin Guide to Jazz Recordings	3/4 stars

The Allmusic review by Scott Yanow noted "none of the songs are all that memorable by themselves. This worthwhile if not particularly essential release is a bit of a historical curiosity". On All About Jazz William Grim was more enthusiastic writing "Out of the entire recorded oeuvre of the Stan Kenton Orchestra, Adventures in Time is one of the most adventurous and musically satisfying records. ...While some critics have derided this album as bombastic and unjazzlike, Kenton and Richards were aiming for much more than the typical fare for a big band. What the Modern Jazz Quartet did in synthesizing the jazz combo and European chamber music, Kenton was doing in combining the big band with the complexities and sonorities of the traditional European orchestra. ...Adventures in Time sounds as breathtakingly modern today as it did when it was first released over forty years ago".

== Track listing ==
All compositions by Johnny Richards.

1. "Commencement" - 3:07
2. "Quintile" - 6:58
3. "Artemis" - 5:33
4. "3 x 3 x 2 x 2 x 2 = 72" - 4:27
5. "March to Polaris" - 5:52
6. "Septuor from Antares" - 3:51
7. "Artemis and Apollo" - 4:32
8. "Apercu" - 3:54
- Recorded at Capitol Studios in Hollywood, CA on September 24, 1962 (track 1), September 25, 1962 (track 2), September 26, 1962 (tracks 3–5), September 27, 1962 (tracks 6 & 7) and September 28, 1962 (track 8).

== Personnel ==
- Stan Kenton - piano
- Bob Behrendt, Keith La Motte, Gary Slavo, Dalton Smith, Marvin Stamm - trumpet
- Bob Fitzpatrick, Bud Parker, Tom Ringo - trombone
- Jim Amlotte - bass trombone
- Dave Wheeler - bass trombone, tuba
- Joe Burnett, Dwight Carver, Lou Gasca, Ray Starling - mellophone
- Gabe Baltazar - alto saxophone
- Ray Florian, Don Menza, tenor saxophone
- Allan Beutler - baritone saxophone
- Joel Kaye - baritone saxophone, bass saxophone
- Bucky Calabrese - bass
- Dee Barton - drums
- Steve Dweck - tympani, percussion
- Johnny Richards - arranger, conductor
