= Stan Kenton / Jean Turner =

Studio album by Stan Kenton
- Released: 1964
- Recorded: September 11 & 12, 1963
- Studio: Capitol (Hollywood)
- Genre: Jazz
- Label: Capitol T/ST 2051
- Producer: Lee Gillette

Stan Kenton chronology
| Artistry in Voices and Brass (1963) | Stan Kenton / Jean Turner (1964) | Kenton / Wagner (1964) |

Stan Kenton / Jean Turner (full title From the Creative World of Stan Kenton Comes the Exciting New Voice of Jean Turner) is an album by the Stan Kenton Orchestra with vocalist Jean Turner recorded in 1963 by Capitol Records.

== Reception ==
Professional ratings
Review scores
| Source | Rating |
|---|---|
| Allmusic | 3/5 stars |

The Allmusic site gave the album 3 stars.

== Track listing ==
1. "A Lot of Livin' to Do" (Charles Strouse, Lee Adams) – 2:04
2. "Oh! You Crazy Moon" (Jimmy Van Heusen, Johnny Burke) – 2:31
3. "Sleepy Lagoon" (Eric Coates, Jack Lawrence) – 2:12
4. "Love Is Here to Stay" (George Gershwin, Ira Gershwin) – 2:41
5. "Piel Canela" (Bobby Capó) – 2:26
6. "It's a Big Wide Wonderful World!" (John Rox) – 1:38
7. "Someone to Watch Over Me" (G. Gershwin, I. Gershwin) – 2:36
8. "Love Walked In" (G. Gershwin, I. Gershwin) – 2:35
9. "Day Dream" (Billy Strayhorn, Duke Ellington, John La Touche) – 3:42
10. "Quizás, Quizás, Quizás" (Osvaldo Farrés, Joe Davis) – 2:45
11. "You're the Top" (Cole Porter) – 2:36
- Recorded at Capitol Studios in Hollywood, CA on September 11, 1963 (tracks 1, 5–7 & 9–11) and September 12, 1963 (tracks 2–4 & 8).

== Personnel ==
- Stan Kenton – piano, arranger, conductor
- Jean Turner – vocals
- Bob Behrendt, Ron Keller, Buzzy Mills, Ronnie Ossa, Tommy Porrello – trumpet
- Edwin "Buddy" Baker, Bob Curnow, Jiggs Whigham – trombone
- Jim Amlotte – bass trombone
- Dave Wheeler – bass trombone, tuba
- Bob Crull, Robert Fause, David Horton, Tony Scodwell – mellophone
- Gabe Baltazar – alto saxophone
- Ray Florian, Steve Marcus – tenor saxophone
- Dale Norris – baritone saxophone
- Joel Kaye – baritone saxophone, bass saxophone, alto flute
- John Worster – bass
- Dee Barton – drums
- Frank Carlson – bongos (tracks 1, 5, 6, 10 & 11)
- Bill Holman (tracks 1 & 6), Lennie Niehaus (tracks 3–5 & 7–11) – arranger
