= Artistry in Bossa Nova =

Studio album by Stan Kenton
- Released: 1963
- Recorded: April 16–17, 1963
- Studio: Capitol (Hollywood)
- Genre: Jazz
- Length: 37:00
- Label: Capitol T/ST 1931
- Producer: Lee Gillette

Stan Kenton chronology
Adventures in Time (1962)	Artistry in Bossa Nova (1963)	Artistry in Voices and Brass (1963)

Artistry in Bossa Nova is an album by the Stan Kenton Orchestra performing old and new compositions arranged in a bossa nova style recorded and released by Capitol Records in 1963.

== Reception ==
Professional ratings
Review scores
Source	Rating
Allmusic	4/5 stars

The Allmusic review by Scott Yanow noted "Although one might consider this project to be an example of Kenton jumping on the bandwagon (since the bossa nova fad was at its peak at the time), the music is quite enjoyable".

== Track listing ==
All compositions by Stan Kenton except where noted.

1. "Artistry in Rhythm" - 2:48
2. "Opus in Chartreuse" (Gene Roland) - 3:10
3. "Interlude" (Kenton, Bob Russell) - 2:28
4. "Kentonova" - 3:53
5. "Eager Beaver" - 3:32
6. "Concerto to End All Concertos" - 3:15
7. "Brasilia" - 2:21
8. "Painted Rhythm" - 3:25
9. "Opus in Pastels" - 3:01
10. "Jump for Joe" (Roland) - 3:28
11. "Loco-Nova" - 2:50
12. "Artistry in Bossa Nova" (Pete Rugolo) - 2:49
- Recorded at Capitol Studios in Hollywood, CA on April 16, 1963 (tracks 3, 6 & 7) and April 17, 1963 (tracks 1, 2, 4, 5 & 8–12).

== Personnel ==
- Stan Kenton - piano, arranger, conductor
- Bob Behrendt, Bud Brisbois, Conte Candoli, Bob Rolfe, Dalton Smith - trumpet
- Gil Falco, Bob Fitzpatrick, Kent Larsen - trombone
- Jim Amlotte, - bass trombone
- Dave Wheeler - bass trombone, tuba
- Joe Burnett, Dwight Carver, Bob Grull, Tony Scodwell - mellophone
- Gabe Baltazar - alto saxophone
- Ray Florian, Steve Marcus - tenor saxophone
- Jack Nimitz - baritone saxophone
- Joel Kaye - baritone saxophone, bass saxophone
- Don Bagley - bass
- Dee Barton - drums
- Larry Bunker, Frank "Chico" Guerrero - Latin percussion
