= Kenton with Voices =

Studio album by Stan Kenton
- Released: 1957
- Recorded: January 17, February 5 & 22 and March 4, 1957
- Studio: Capitol (Hollywood)
- Genre: Jazz
- Length: 33:13
- Label: Capitol T 810
- Producer: Lee Gillette

Stan Kenton chronology
Cuban Fire! (1956)	Kenton with Voices (1957)	Rendezvous with Kenton (1957)

Kenton with Voices is an album by bandleader and pianist Stan Kenton featuring performances recorded in 1957 and released on the Capitol label.

== Reception ==
Professional ratings
Review scores
Source	Rating
Allmusic	4/5 stars

The Allmusic review by Lindsay Planer noted "The trademark brash and stylistic covers run the gamut from the robust and harmonically intense opener "Dancing in the Dark," to the equally complex structure of the hauntingly gorgeous "Sophisticated Lady." There is also a remake of the Kenton classic "Eager Beaver," which had been his first significant hit back in 1943. Particularly notable is the exhilarating and slightly tropical rendering of "Temptation," which is awash in the chic 'space age bachelor pad' vibe of heavily provocative percussion".

== Track listing ==
1. "Dancing in the Dark" (Howard Dietz, Arthur Schwartz) – 2:05
2. "Sophisticated Lady" (Duke Ellington, Mitchell Parish) – 2:34
3. "Softly" (Eddie Beal, Joe Greene) – 3:01
4. "Eager Beaver" (Stan Kenton) – 3:30
5. "Women Usually Do" (Greene) – 2:45
6. "After You" (Seger Ellis) – 3:22
7. "Temptation" (Nacio Herb Brown, Arthur Freed) – 2:30
8. "Walk Softly" (Johnny Richards, Blanca Webb) – 2:52
9. "Opus in Chartreuse" (Gene Roland) – 3:00
10. "All About Ronnie" (Greene) – 3:04
11. "Interlude" (Pete Rugolo) – 2:37
12. "Lullaby of the Leaves" (Bernice Petkere, Joe Young) – 2:02
- Recorded at Capitol Studios, Hollywood, CA on January 17, 1957 (tracks 6, 8 & 10), February 5, 1957 (tracks 5, 9 & 11), February 22, 1957 (tracks 3, 4 & 7) and March 4, 1957 (tracks 1, 2 & 12)

== Personnel ==
- Stan Kenton – piano, conductor, arranger
- The Modern Men – vocals
  - Tony Katics
  - Al Oliveri
  - Paul Salamunovich
  - Bob Smart
- Ed Leddy – trumpet (tracks 8 & 10)
- Jim Amlotte, Bob Fitzpatrick, John Halliburton, Kent Larsen – trombone (tracks 1–5 & 7–12)
- Karl De Karske (tracks 1, 2, 5, 9, 11 & 12), George Roberts (tracks 3, 4, 6–8 & 10) – bass trombone
- Lennie Niehaus, Charlie Mariano – alto saxophone (tracks 1–4, 7, 8, 10 & 12)
- Richie Kamuca, Bill Perkins – tenor saxophone (tracks 1–4, 7, 8, 10 & 12)
- Pepper Adams – baritone saxophone (tracks 1–4, 7, 8, 10 & 12)
- Ralph Blaze – guitar
- Don Bagley (tracks 6, 8 & 10), Red Mitchell (tracks 1–5, 7, 9, 11 & 12) – bass
- Shelly Manne (tracks 5, 9 & 11), Mel Lewis (tracks 1–4, 6–8, 10 & 11) – drums
- Jack Costanzo – bongos (tracks 3, 4 & 7)
- Ramon Rivera – congas (tracks 1, 2 & 12)
- Ann Richards – vocals (tracks 3, 5 & 9)
