= Glenn Henry (band leader) =

Glenn Alby Henry Jr.
- Born: Glenn Alby Henry, Jr. August 29, 1915; Terril, Iowa
- Died: July 29, 1993 (aged 77) Santa Barbara, California
- Genres: Big band
- Occupation: Band leader
- Instruments: Clarinet, alto sax, vocals
- Years active: 1935–1970
- Labels: Miltone

Glenn Henry (sometimes billed as Glen Henry; né Glenn Alby Henry, Jr.; 29 August 1915 Terril, Iowa – 29 July 1993 Santa Barbara, California) was an American band leader of a popular West Coast big band bearing his name, "Glenn Henry and His Orchestra."

== History ==
General Henry's orchestra, a 14 and sometimes 15-piece group, flourished between 1935 and the 1950s, and featured various female solo vocalists and the Quintones. Henry fronted his band as a clarinetist, saxophonist, and vocalist.

Before World War II

Henry's band was initially based out of Pocatello, Idaho – while he was a student at Idaho State University beginning 1934, studying to be an engineer. The band's first major commercial engagement was in 1935 at the Old Faithful Lodge at Yellowstone National Park. The band received high acclaim and returned to Yellowstone for five consecutive seasons. (Note: Courtesy National Park Service, Yellowstone National Park Archives, "Interview with Glenn Henry Orchestra," by Tom Tankersley (1990); 96-21 (cassette) Note: The Glenn Henry Orchestra performed at the Old Faithful Inn from 1935 to 1938. Tankersley (né John Thomas Tankersley; born 1953), at the time of the interview, was a Yellowstone Park Historian and Archivist. He interviewed five of the original members of the band: Glenn Henry, Ralph Roberts, Charley Waring (né Charles Denny Waring; 1918–1998), Werner Arnold Erickson (1917–2005), and Bob Grady. The interview is based on the band's experiences as performers in Yellowstone during the 1930s, and their observations of how the park has changed. The file consists of one tape. The Yellowstone National Park Archives are part of the Heritage & Research Center, located in Gardiner, Montana) In 1936, at the Pocatello High School Senior Ball, his orchestra was called "Glenn Henry and His Idahoans." Henry eventually moved to the Los Angeles area. In late 1942, Henry's Orchestra performed throughout the Pacific Coast on a USO tour.

In the fall of 1942, Henry's Orchestra was designated a Coca-Cola Spotlight Band; and, on December 25, 1942 — midway through a 13-week engagement in Seattle — 15 minutes of a live performance by the band, from Fort Lewis, Washington, was broadcast over the Blue Network as part of the longest show in radio history, and most widely aired, featuring what then was deemed the best big bands in the country — 43 bands from 43 locations, coast-to-coast.

During World War II

RCA presented a touring contract and eventual record contract to Henry in 1942. After embarking up the first few dates, Henry was drafted thus putting a halt to the tour and eventual recording contract. For two-and-one-half-years during World War II, Henry served in the U.S. Army ground forces with the 96th Infantry Division band as band leader.

After World War II

After the war, Henry received an honorable discharge and re-organized his band in Los Angeles. In 1946, Henry's Orchestra regularly broadcast under the tag line, "For Those Who Prefer Music." In the late 1960s, Henry became an independent booking agent for bands, operating under the name "Glenn Henry Entertainment Agency." Henry maintained that avocation until shortly before his death in 1993. Henry's performing career endured after the decline of big bands in the 1950s, leading combos through the 1970s, featuring his wife on vocals, performing mostly local engagements and special events, in and around Santa Barbara. Harry Johnson, his pianist, became the office manager with the Glenn Henry Entertainment Agency.

Bookings on the East Coast for Glenn Henry's Orchestra were rare. However, the Glenn Henry Orchestra made its debut east of the Mississippi in a moonlight performance aboard the S.S. Bear Mountain showboat on June 13, 1949. The boat had been rented by Congress for that night.

In 1959, Henry's quartet — composed of the same personnel that recorded the 1964 album featuring his wife, Shades of Cherie — completed a 33-week engagement at the Windsor Hotel in Bermuda. From about 1958 to 1960, Henry led a quartet at venues such as Harrah's Lake Tahoe and Harrah's Reno.

In 1969, when the Seabees put on a 27-year anniversary celebration attended by over 4000 naval and civilian personnel at the Naval Construction Battalion Center at Port Hueneme, the entertainment was provided by the Glenn Henry Orchestra and popular USO entertainers Joy Wilkerson (née Gladys Joy Wright; 1930–2011) — actress and Playboy Bunny — as well as "Honey Ltd.," a female vocal quartet, and "The Party of Four," another female vocal quartet.

== Style ==
Beginning around the late 1940s, Henry's orchestra had over 300 arrangements.

Impressions in Rhythm

After World War II, Henry's arranger, pianist, and vocalist Bill Dixon arranged recognizable vignettes of hummable classical works and adopted the tag line, "Impressions in Rhythm." Dixon, one of the original members in Henry's new band after World War II, explained that the "Impressions" were melodic classical works set to pleasant dance tempos. The arrangements included Tchaikovsky's Piano Concerto, Debussy's Clair de Lune, Debussy's Afternoon of a Faun, Massenet's Elegie, Rubinstein's Kamennoi Ostrow, Rachmaninoff's Piano Concerto No. 2, Addinsell's Warsaw Concerto, Chopin's Fantaisie Impromptu, and Beethoven's Moonlight Sonata.

General repertoire Henry's dance orchestra repertoire was diverse and included a full-range of swing arrangements, but performance sets typically leaned toward popular songs and danceable music in a sweet genre, close to Glenn Miller, but sweeter, but not as sweet as Jan Garber or Lawrence Welk. Henry's orchestra had enough original compositions and arrangements that distinguished it with its own sound and style. In other words, his bands throughout the years could not be characterized as mostly a cover band.

== Selected band alumni ==
Vocalists

- Velma Sherrell, vocalist, was the initial pseudonym for Evelyn Dinsmoor, a nationally publicized beauty queen from Long Beach, California, who joined Henry's Orchestra around December 18, 1942
- Evelyn Dinsmoor (née Evelyn Louise Dinsmoor; 1923–1995), vocalist who married Glenn Henry on March 31, 1943, in Los Angeles County; she also was a Hollywood starlet, having had an appearance in the 1943 film, Silver Skates; she started with Glenn Henry's band during their fifth of thirteen weeks at the Trianon Ballroom in Seattle, in December 1942.
- Maxine Elliott was in the band in the 1950; she had a minor role in the film Copacabana
- Cherie Lynn (née Cherie Lou Christensen; 1932–2007), vocalist, married Glenn Henry in 1951, and remained married to him until his death
- Chris Henry, featured female vocalist from about May 1946 through 1948 also had a short marriage with Glenn during this time; she had a minor role the 1946 film, Night and Day
- Melody Four, featured quartet in 1946
- Glenn Trio, instrumental trio featured in 1946
- The Quintones, began around 1948, replacing the Melody Four
- Glen Henry Glee Club

Trumpets

- Jack Maurice Millman (de) (born 1930)
- Roy Munson was with Henry's band in 1942
- Robert Andrew Ontiveros (1950-2011)
- Ruben McFall (born 1931)

Trombones

- Keith Albano (né Harold Keith Albano; 1922–2006)
- Jimmy Knepper
- Garr Crowley, 1960s,1970s
- Tom Cormier, 1960s,1970s

Saxophones, woodwinds

- Joe Maini (1930–1964) was with Henry's band in 1950
- Bill Hood (né William H. Hood; 1924–1992), tenor saxophonist, was with Henry's band in 1942
- Lennie Niehaus, alto saxophonist
- Bill Trujillo (né William Lee Trujillo; born 1930), tenor saxophonist, began his first job as a professional musician with Henry's Orchestra at age 16 (1946)
- Bob Sennett, bari sax and composer, began working with Henry in 1963
- Bruce Babcock, alto sax, began working with Henry in 1969
- Charles Orena, tenor sax, 1960s,1970s
- Dave Sanchez, alto sax, 1960s,1970s
- Fred Moore, baritone sax, 1960s,1970s
- David Northart, alto sax, 1960s,1970s

Rhythm section

- Swede Meredith (né Howard Bradley Meredith; 1924–2003), drummer, vocalist, arranger, and featured percussionist of African-Cuban Rhythms
- Bill Dixon, featured arranger, pianist in 1946

Original members

- Glenn Henry, clarinetist, saxophonist, vocalist, leader
- Ralph Roberts
- Charley Waring (né Charles Denny Waring; 1918–1998)
- Werner Arnold Erickson (1917–2005)
- Bob Grady

1941 Members

- Glenn Henry
- T.D. Jones (né Thomas Daniels Jones; 1923–1990) of Malad City, Idaho
- Bob Watson
- Art Angelelli
- Melvin Anderson
- Keith Albano (né Harold Keith Albano; 1922–2006)
- Charley Waring (né Charles Denny Waring; 1918–1998)
- Orville Hansen
- George Ganz

Manager

- Donald Richard Larrabee (born 1923), began working for Glenn Henry after the War, while the band was playing at the Aragon Ballroom

Booking

- Beginning September 1941, MCA managed the booking for the Glenn Henry Orchestra.

In 1952, eight members of the band, including vocalist Cherie Lynn, attended three Long Beach high schools at the same time and played together at all the proms and balls.

== Random dates ==
- Huntington Beach Ballroom (weekly, beginning February 1947)
- Jantzen Beach Ballroom (called Dansant, operated by Paul E. Huedepohl), Portland (4 nights a week, beginning March 1943)
- Washington, D.C., Moonlight Cruise of the S.S. Bear Mountain (Glen Henry's debut east of the Mississippi), the audience were members of the U.S. Congress
- Jerry Jone's Rainbow Randevu Ballroom, Salt Lake City (October 1949)
- Lagoon Patio Gardens, between Ogden and Salt Lake City (1950 and 1951)
- Willamette Park (1950)
- Aragon Ballroom (Ocean Park, Santa Monica, California), "Glenn Henry's New Band with Lawrence Welk" (1946)
- Biltmore Hotel, Los Angeles
- Rio Nido Hotel, Los Angeles
- Paris Inn, San Diego
- Tony's El Patio Ballroom, Reno (1946)
- Coca-Cola Spotlight Band, broadcast live over the Blue Network from Fort Lewis, Washington, December 25, 1942.
- Valleon Ballroom, Afton, Wyoming (1951)
- Mission Beach Ballroom
- Saltair, Utah (1942)
- Vallejo-Mar Naval Base (1942)
- Plantation Parade of Bands, 6600 Hines Boulevard, Dallas (1947)
- Hollywood Palladium (1946)
- La Loma Ballroom, Albuquerque (1946)
- Dalhart, Texas, following Bob Wills and the Texas Playboys (1947)
- Trocadero Club, Galveston (1950)
- Rose Garden, Pismo Beach, California (1951)

== Selected discography ==
Glen Henry Orchestra
Miltone Records, 78 rpm

- Miltone M 481

5253 A: "So In Love," by Cole Porter, Maxine Elliott, vocalist

- Miltone M 482

5253 B: "Three Little Words," by Kalmar and Ruby

- Miltone M 485

5255 A: "Bongo Minor," arranged by Bill Dixon, Swede Meredith (né Howard Bradley Meredith; 1924–2003), percussion soloist

- Miltone M 486

5255 B: "Why Can't You Behave?" by Cole Porter, Maxine Elliott, vocalist

- Miltone M 486 (1945)

5258 A: "Why Can't You Behave?" by Cole Porter, Maxine Elliott, vocalist

- Miltone LB 501 (1945)

5258 B: "Yes, I'm In Love," by Harvey Brooks — Joe Alexander and Glenn Henry Orchestra, Joe Alexander, vocalist

- Miltone M 513 (1949)

5265 A: "Envy," sung by Roy Cordell (né Roy Leadbetter Cordell; 1925–1994) with Studio Orchestra (Glenn Henry is not credited on this track)

- Miltone M 514 (1949)

5265 B: "Snow Shoes," by Johnson, Meredith, and Henry

Other labels

- Tops Records 1001 (re-release of Miltone M 513 and Miltone M 485)

A: "Envy," performed by Roy Cordell and Studio Orchestra (Glenn Henry is not credited on this track)
B: "Bongo Minor," arranged by Bill Dixon, Swede Meredith (né Howard Bradley Meredith; 1924–2003), percussion soloist

- Shades of Cherie, Cherie Lynn with the Glenn Henry Quartet (LP Album)

Recorded in 1964 in Hollywood, California
Produced by Glenn Henry
Personnel: Cherie Lynn (née Cherie Lou Christensen, Glenn Henry's wife; 1932–2007), vocalist on 1–7; Glenn Henry, clarinet and alto sax; Harry Johnson (né Harold Johnson), piano; Jim Marquard (né James William Marquard; 1929–2008), bass and trombone on 12; Harry Smallenburg (né Harry Russell Smallenburg; born 1942), drums
Original LP released by Breeze Records (Note: Breeze Records was owned and operated by Glenn Alby Henry Jr.)
LP re-released in Japan in 1995 Breeze / Norma NLP 5514, Japan (mono)
Re-released as a CD on March 23, 2011, AMJ Jazz Collection, manufactured by Absorb Music Japan, Inc. (Absorb ABCJ-627), distributed by King Records Co., Ltd. (Note: According to Glenn Alby Henry III in 2015, the surviving children — direct decedents of the marriage union of Glenn Alby Henry, Jr., and Cherie Lynn (Lou) Henry — neither approve nor endorse the release of the CD Shades of Cherie on the 1995 and/or 2011 Japanese label. Henry contends that the release by the Japanese label is unauthorized in that it was done without express written consent of the surviving children, specifically without the express written consent of the executors of the Henry Family Trust. Moreover, the surviving family receives no proceeds of the sales of this CD. Henry contends that the recording was made for family and friends, only.)
Side 1

1. "Day In Day Out," by Bloom & Mercer
2. "Angel Eyes," by Brent & Dennis
3. "Happiness is a Thing Called Joe," by Arlen & Harburg
4. "Early Autumn," by Herman, Burns & Mercer
5. "Old Devil Moon," by Lane & Harburg
6. "Baubles, Bangles, & Beads," by Forrest & Wright
7. "Scarlet Ribbons," by Danzig & Segal

Side 2

8. "Take Me Out To The Ball Game"
9. "The Breeze and I," by Lecuona
10. "Street of Dreams"
11. "Serenade in Blue," by Gordon & Warren
12. "Our Love is Here To Stay," by Gershwin
13. "I Loves You, Porgy," by Gershwin

== Family ==
Henry, born in Iowa, moved with his family to California when he was one. Before Henry had turned four, his family had moved to San Bernardino, California. By the time he was five, his family was living in Pocatello, Idaho. His father, Glenn Alby Henry, Sr. (1890–1950), had been a telegraph operator and, from 1934, worked for Union Pacific and an agent, moving to Victor, then to Blackfoot, Idaho. Glenn, Jr., was married three times:

- 1st marriage on February 19, 1939, to Mary Madge Stephens (1920–2006); they had two daughters, Sharon and Irene.
- 2nd marriage on June 20, 1943, in Los Angeles to Evelyn (stage name Chris) Louise Dinsmoor (1923–1995), her first marriage, who at the time was the vocalist in Henry's orchestra; Henry had enlisted in the U.S. Army June 4, 1943. Approximately two years later, he received a "dear John" letter from his wife.
- 3rd marriage on August 30, 1951, at the Wee Kirk o' the Heather in Glendale, California, to Cherie Lou Christensen (whose only other prior marriage was annulled by her father as she was only 17 years old.); which lasted over 50 years until the death of each of them. They had 6 children, Sherilynn Irene Henry, Glenn Alby Henry III, Steven Richard Henry, Donald Warren Henry, Shawn Randall Henry and Jason Clifford Henry (twins). Cherie Henry died in 2007 in Santa Barbara, California.
