= Finian's Rainbow (album) =

Studio album by Stan Kenton
- Released: 1968
- Recorded: July 16–18, 1968
- Studio: Capitol (Hollywood)
- Genre: Jazz
- Label: Capitol T/ST 2971
- Producer: Lee Gillette

Stan Kenton chronology
The Jazz Compositions of Dee Barton (1967)	Finian's Rainbow (1968)	Hair (1969)

Finian's Rainbow is an album by bandleader Stan Kenton recorded in 1968 for Capitol Records.

== Reception ==
The Allmusic review by Lindsay Planer says "Stan Kenton (piano/arranger) lends his highly stylistic touch to an assortment of Broadway and silver screen selections on the appropriately-titled Finian's Rainbow (1968). His proficiency as a jazz arranger and consummate musician provide unique interpretations on ten familiar melodies -- five taken from the score of Finian's Rainbow [Original Broadway Cast] (1947), and five from films".

== Track listing ==
All compositions by Burton Lane and Yip Harburg except where noted.

1. "Old Devil Moon" - 2:46
2. "If This Isn't Love" - 2:25
3. "When I'm Not Near The Girl I Love" - 2:21
4. "How Are Things in Glocca Morra?" - 2:28
5. "That Great Come-and-Get-It Day" - 3:00
6. "Lullaby from Rosemary's Baby" (Krzysztof Komeda) - 3:01
7. "People" (Jule Styne, Bob Merrill) - 2:07
8. "Villa Rides" (Maurice Jarre, Eddie Snyder, Larry Kusik) - 3:07
9. "Chastity Belt" (Riz Ortolani) - 2:56
10. "The Odd Couple" (Neal Hefti, Sammy Kahn) - 2:35
- Recorded at Capitol Studios in Hollywood, CA on July 16, 1968 (tracks 5 & 10), July 17, 1968 (tracks 1, 2 & 9) and July 18, 1968 (tracks 3, 4 & 6–8).

== Personnel ==
- Stan Kenton - piano, conductor
- Jay Daversa, Darryl Eaton, Jim Kartchner, John Madrid, Mike Price - trumpet
- Shelly Denny, Dick Shearer, Tom Whittaker - trombone
- Joe Randazzo - bass trombone
- Bob Goodwin - bass trombone, tuba
- Ray Reed - alto saxophone, flute
- Mike Altschul, Bob Crosby - tenor saxophone, clarinet
- Earle Dumler - baritone saxophone, English horn
- John Mitchell - baritone saxophone (tracks 6 & 8)
- Bill Fritz - bass saxophone, baritone saxophone (tracks 1–7, 9 & 10)
- Emil Richards - vibraphone, marimba (track 8)
- Al Vescovo - guitar
- John Smith - bass
- Dee Barton - drums, arranger
- Efraim Logreira - percussion
