= Rendezvous at Sunset =

"Rendezvous at Sunset" may refer to:

- "Rendezvous at Sunset", song by Stan Kenton from the album Back to Balboa
- "Rendezvous at Sunset", song by Kylie Minogue, B-side to "Can't Get You Out of My Head"
