= The Jazz Compositions of Dee Barton =

Studio album by Stan Kenton and His Orchestra
- Released: 1968
- Recorded: December 19–20, 1967
- Studio: Capitol (Hollywood)
- Genre: Jazz
- Length: 38:07
- Label: Capitol T/ST 2932
- Producer: Lee Gillette

Stan Kenton chronology
The World We Know (1967)	The Jazz Compositions of Dee Barton (1968)	Finian's Rainbow (1968)

The Jazz Compositions of Dee Barton is an album by bandleader Stan Kenton recorded in 1967 by Capitol Records.

== Reception ==
The Allmusic review by Scott Yanow says " This LP consists of seven Dee Barton charts of his originals. Barton was the band's drummer and, along with tenor-saxophonist Kim Richmond (who would later develop into a top arranger himself), is about the graduate of this particular group to have a significant jazz career. The music is well-played but not overly memorable, sort of like this edition of the Stan Kenton Orchestra".

== Legacy ==
The album has become the most important artistic achievement by the Kenton organization from that late 1960s era of otherwise desperate attempts at achieving commercial success. The album was different and was not cast in the typical Kenton style most of his fans were familiar with. When the album is heard with broader ears there are "intriguing colors and attractive themes interacting with typical Kentonian sounds and dissonance." Trombonist Jim Amlotte sums up this album well, "This is what Stan wanted. He didn't want a copy-cat of what had gone before. Stan didn't like to look back - he was always moving forward to the next thing."

== Track listing ==
All compositions by Dee Barton.

1. "Man" - 4:27
2. "Lonely Boy" - 2:48
3. "The Singing Oyster" - 3:34
4. "Dilemma" - 5:54
5. "Three Thoughts" - 5:30
6. "A New Day" - 7:32
7. "Woman" - 6:16
- Recorded at Capitol Studios in Hollywood, CA on December 19, 1967 (tracks 3, 5 & 7) and December 20, 1967 (tracks 1, 2, 4 & 6).

== Personnel ==
- Stan Kenton - piano, conductor
- Jay Daversa, Jim Kartchner, Carl Leach, John Madrid, Mike Price - trumpet
- Tom Senff, Dick Shearer, Tom Whittaker - trombone
- Jim Amlotte - bass trombone
- Graham Ellis - tuba
- Ray Reed - alto saxophone, flute
- Mike Altschul, Kim Richmond - tenor saxophone
- Mike Vaccaro - baritone saxophone
- Earle Dumler - baritone saxophone, bass saxophone
- Don Bagley - bass
- Dee Barton - drums, arranger
