= Stan Kenton Plays for Today =

Studio album by Stan Kenton
- Released: 1967
- Recorded: October 27, November 8 and December 14 & 19, 1966
- Studio: Capitol (Hollywood)
- Genre: Jazz
- Label: Capitol T/ST 2655
- Producer: Lee Gillette

Stan Kenton chronology
Stan Kenton Conducts the Los Angeles Neophonic Orchestra (1965)	Stan Kenton Plays for Today (1967)	The World We Know (1967)

Stan Kenton Plays for Today is an album by bandleader Stan Kenton recorded in 1966 by Capitol Records.

== Track listing ==
1. "It Was A Very Good Year" (Ervin Drake) - 2:17
2. "Yesterday" (John Lennon, Paul McCartney) - 2:05
3. "Sabre Dance" (Aram Katchaturian) - 4:14
4. "Spanish Eyes" (Bert Kaempfert, Charles Singleton, Eddie Snyder) - 2:27
5. "Cumana" (Barclay Allen, Harold Spina, Roc Hillman) - 3:20
6. "The Sound of Music" (Richard Rodgers, Oscar Hammerstein II) - 2:57
7. "Somewhere, My Love (Lara's Theme)" (Maurice Jarre) - 2:18
8. "Never on Sunday" (Manos Hadjidakis) - 3:36
9. "Michelle" (Lennon, McCartney) - 2:38
10. "Strangers in the Night" (Kaempfert, Singleton. Snyder) - 2:47
11. "Anna" (Roman Vatro) - 3:30
- Recorded at Capitol Studios in Hollywood, CA on October 27, 1966 (tracks 3 & 7), November 8, 1966 (tracks 8 & 10), December 14, 1966 (tracks 1, 2, 4 & 9) and December 19, 1966 (tracks 5, 6 & 11).

== Personnel ==
- Stan Kenton - piano, conductor, arranger
- Gary Barone, Bud Brisbois, Ronnie Ossa, Dalton Smith, Jimmy Salko (tracks 1, 2 4–6 & 8–11), Ray Triscari (tracks 3 & 7) - trumpet
- Monty Budwig (tracks 1, 2, 4–6, 9 & 11), John Worster (tracks 3, 7, 8 & 10) - bass
- Frank DeVito (tracks 3, 7, 8 & 10), Ray Price (tracks 1, 2, 4–6, 9 & 11) - drums
- Larry Bunker (tracks 8 & 10), Frank Carlson, Emil Richards (tracks 1–7, 9 & 11), Adolpho "Chino" Valdez - percussion
