= Mike Price (jazz trumpeter) =

American jazz musician

- Born: 1941 (age 83–84); Chicago, Illinois, U.S.
- Origin: Valparaiso, Indiana, U.S.
- Genres: Jazz
- Instrument: Trumpet

Mike Price is an American jazz trumpeter and composer from the Chicago area.

== Early life and education ==
Price was born in Chicago and raised in Florida and Valparaiso, Indiana. After graduating from Valparaiso High School in 1959, he studied music education at Northwestern University, continued his education in composition at the Berklee College of Music in Boston, and received a master's degree in jazz studies from the University of Southern California.

== Career ==
In the late-1960s, Price toured and recorded with major big bands including those of Stan Kenton and Buddy Rich. Price was also an original member of the Toshiko Akiyoshi – Lew Tabackin Big Band in Los Angeles and performed on all of the band's Grammy-nominated recordings of the 1970s and early 1980s.

In the late-1980s, Price moved to Japan, where he leads his own quintet and big band and plays in Nobuo Hara's big band, "Sharps & Flats."

== Discography ==
As leader

- Presenting Mike Price Jazz Quintet in Tokyo, Japan (2011)

With Stan Kenton

- The Jazz Compositions of Dee Barton (Capitol, 1967)
- Finian's Rainbow (Capitol, 1968)
