= Dee Barton =

American musician (1937–2001)

- Born: Dewells Barton, Jr. September 18, 1937; Houston, Mississippi, U.S.
- Origin: Starkville, Mississippi, U.S.
- Died: December 3, 2001 (aged 64) Brandon, Mississippi, U.S.
- Genres: Jazz; Classical; Pop; Film Score
- Occupations: Musician; composer; arranger; orchestrator; conductor; music director; educator
- Instruments: Euphonium; Trombone; Drums; Piano
- Years active: 1957–2001
- Label: Capitol

Dewells "Dee" Barton Jr. (September 18, 1937 — December 3, 2001) was an American composer, arranger, and jazz multi-instrumentalist. He was known for his association with the Stan Kenton Orchestra and his work in big band. He was also known for his film scores, frequently collaborating with Clint Eastwood.

== Biography ==
=== Early years ===
Dee Barton was born in Houston, Mississippi, in 1937. The family moved to Starkville, Mississippi, in 1941. His father became the band director at Starkville High School. "My dad brought home an old E flat mellophone and at the age of three I figured out the fingerings on it," said Barton. Barton later took up the trombone. He practiced in the school band room for 10 hours a day, and was able to help when his father was ill. Barton was able to take over his father's work and teach all of his classes for two years to keep the Starkville High School job running.

Barton went on to attend Murray State University and after that North Texas State University where he was a member of the famed One O'Clock Lab Band under Gene Hall and Leon Breeden. In 1957 Barton already had a reputation and wanted to study composition at North Texas State University but had no money. Dr. Gene Hall, head of the department of music, arranged a full scholarship for Barton.

=== Professional work and Stan Kenton ===
Barton early on had an ambition to join the Stan Kenton Orchestra. He first met Kenton backstage at a concert in 1953 when Barton was 15. "Stan was very strange in one sense," said Barton. "He never forgot the name of anybody I ever saw him meet. I didn't see him until two years later when I'd grown some. So I was surprised when he called me by name."

Determined then to get away from Mississippi, Barton went on the road in 1956 with Ralph Marterie's big band. "He was not a kind man, and it was a most unpleasant experience that almost turned me against the road altogether." He left the band in New York three weeks later and replaced an absent trombonist in the Maynard Ferguson Big Band. He also worked with the Charlie Spivak band during that time.

While Barton was attending school, Stan Kenton came to teach at a music clinic at North Texas State University in August 1959. Kenton became very familiar with Barton's playing and writing abilities. In 1961, at the age of 23, Barton joined Kenton's orchestra in the trombone section. His compositions Waltz of the Prophets and Turtle Talk were recorded as part of Kenton's Grammy award-winning album Adventures in Jazz. He served on three other major Capitol releases in the trombone section. Barton also acted as a substitute for Kenton's drummer on occasion and in June 1962 he gave up a trombone chair and became the band's drummer recording on Adventures in Time in September 1962, as well as four subsequent Kenton releases. He eventually left the band in late 1963 to pursue a wider music career in Los Angeles. He returned for short tours in 1967 worked with Kenton as drummer and arranger on the album The World We Know and Finian's Rainbow (1968). The highlight of Barton's tenure with Kenton came on the Capitol release Stan Kenton Conducts the Jazz Compositions of Dee Barton where he is showcased as both composer and drummer.

=== Clint Eastwood and Los Angeles ===
Barton moved to Los Angeles and eventually wrote the scores for more than 50 Hollywood films. In his spare time he ran a big band that played regularly at Donte's, a North Hollywood night-club. It was there Clint Eastwood heard Barton's music, eventually commissioning him to write the scores for the films Play Misty For Me (1971), High Plains Drifter (1973), Thunderbolt and Lightfoot (1974) and Every Which Way But Loose (1978). Barton also contributed to the writing for five other Eastwood films, including Dirty Harry (1971) and Magnum Force (1973). Barton worked as a music consultant for Frank Sinatra, the Rolling Stones, Peggy Lee, Tony Bennett, John Lennon and others. He helped Jimmy Webb with the composition of MacArthur Park and later wrote an arrangement of the tune for Stan Kenton.

=== Back to the Mid-South: Memphis TN, Jackson MS ===
In 1973 Barton moved to Memphis TN to become musical director for the William B. Tanner Company (recording studio, media, jingle writing). He worked there until 1988 when he left to work independently and teach seminars at schools. During that decade, he also scored several films for Earl Owensby Studios, a low-budget B-movie studio based in North Carolina.

His 1996 album, The Dallas Jazz Orchestra Plays Dee Barton, was nominated for a Grammy. He continued for live music performances and in films mainly with London Symphony Orchestra and in Europe.

In 1998 Barton moved to Brandon, Mississippi, and he became composer in residence at Jackson State University. "I teach orchestration, composition and advanced theory. Working with kids is what I really enjoy. They're hungry for somebody that has done it, rather than somebody that has gone to school all their life."

== Personal life ==
Barton's first marriage was to Jeri Catheryne Robinson. They had two sons, DeWells Barton III (b. 29 September 29, 1959, Collin County, Texas) and Shannon Barton (b. October 14, 1962, Los Angeles, California). He has three grandchildren, DeWells Barton III's children: Cole Barton (b. October 18, 1999 Los Angeles, California) and Haley Barton (b. February 1, 2002 Denton, Texas), and Shannon Barton's child: Jake Barton (b. 1997 Los Angeles, California) His second wife was Jane E. Earl (married August 15, 1965 Los Angeles – divorced, September 1969, Los Angeles). Dee's brother, William D. "Bill" Barton, was a trombonist, pianist, arranger and band leader. He died December 8, 2007.

=== Death ===
Barton died in Brandon, Mississippi, on December 3, 2001, at the age of 64.

== Selected Big Band Charts ==
- "The Singing Oyster," ("The Gay One")
- "Turtle Talk" ©1962 OCLC 271818939
- "Here's That Rainy Day" OCLC 26627858, 224502342
- "Waltz of the Prophets" ©1962 OCLC 704339536
- "MacArthur Park, parts 1 & 2" OCLC 26747333, 217101595
- "Three thoughts" OCLC 224078755, 704341162
- "Woman" ("The muse")
- "New day" ("Elegy")
- "Dilemma" ("The Chez Rah")
- "Man"
- "Lonely boy"
- "My foolish heart"
- "Elegy" ("a new day")
- "Personal sounds part 1"
- "Personal sounds part 2"
- "Personal sounds part 3"
- "Personal sounds part 4"
- "Personal sounds part 5"
- "The snake" (unissued)
- "How are Things in Glocca Morra?"
- "Lullaby" from Rosemary's Baby
- "Modern man;" a concerto for orchestra, ©1968
- "Stan Kenton prologue" ©1968
- "Dee Day" 1997 OCLC 761045918

== Selected discography ==
As sideman (trombone)

- Ed Summerlin, Liturgical Jazz Ecclesia (1959) OCLC 17283249
- One O'Clock Lab Band, University of North Texas College of Music, 90th Floor Records, Dallas (1961) OCLC 15010703
- Don Jacoby and the College All-Stars, Swinging Big Sound

Recorded in Chicago, October 1961, Decca Records OCLC 8983410, 757663287, 657091758

As trombonist with Stan Kenton

- Horns of Plenty, Volume 2 (2-CD set, 1st CD is Kenton; 2nd CD is the One O'Clock Lab Band), Tantara Records (2000) OCLC 55531300

1st CD recorded in Cincinnati, Ohio, June 16 & 17; and Santa Barbara, California, December 8, 1961

- One Night Stand 5491 OCLC 41637848

Recorded at the Marine Ballroom, Steel Pier, Atlantic City, New Jersey, September 2–4, 1961

- Stan Kenton And His Orchestra

Recorded at the Manhattan Center, New York City, 1 to 4 PM, September 26, 1961 OCLC 44607630
"Waltz of the prophets," arranged by Barton

- Adventures in Standards, Creative World OCLC 6400023

Recorded in Hollywood, California, December 5, 6 and 7, 1961

- Adventures In Jazz, Creative World OCLC 5982600

Recorded in Hollywood, California, December 11 & 12, 13, and 14, 1961
"Waltz of the prophets," arranged by Barton (recorded December 12 and 14, 1961)

- U.A. Air Force Reserve Radio Transcriptions: "Sound '62"

Radio transcriptions, Hollywood, CA, December 15 & 16, 1961
"Waltz of the prophets" (performed)

- Mellophonium Moods 1962, OCLC 182545840

Broadcast, Patio Gardens Ballroom, New Lagoon, Salt Lake City, Utah, March 1962

- Stan Kenton! Tex Ritter!, Capitol Records (1962)OCLC 18204066, 6880195

Recorded in Hollywood, California, March 26, 29, and 30

- Stan Kenton And His Orchestra, Introducing Jean Turner

Recorded in Hollywood, California, 8 to 11 PM, April 3, 1962
Private Recording, Bascom, Ohio, April 23, 1962
"Waltz of the prophets" (recorded April 23, 1962)

- The Sound Of Sixty-two OCLC 40494372, 475099290

Live performance, Holiday Ballroom, Northbrook, Chicago, May 6, 1962
"Waltz of the Prophets" (performed)

As drummer with Stan Kenton

- Horns Of Plenty, Volume 3 OCLC 54832739

Recorded in Westbury, New York, July 2, 1962
"Waltz of the Prophets" (performed)

One Night Stand 5707 OCLC 41637848
Marine Ballroom, Steel Pier, Atlantic City, New Jersey, July 19, 1962

- Stan Kenton And His Orchestra

Broadcasts, WNEW Radio Studios, New York, afternoon, July 28, 1962

- Live from Freedomland, The Bronx, New York, 8 pm, July 28, 1962 OCLC 474686819

"Waltz of the Prophets" (performed)

- More Mellophonium Moods OCLC 46889371

Live, Patio Gardens Ballroom, The Lagoon, Salt Lake City, August 24, 1962

- Adventures in Time, Capitol Records (1963) OCLC 5295402, 23109671

Recorded in Hollywood, California, September 24, 25, 27, and 28, 1962

- Artistry in Bossa Nova OCLC 27148526, 27150697

Recorded in Hollywood, California, April 16, 17, 1963

- Artistry in Voices and Brass Capitol Records (1964) OCLC 5857303

Recorded in Hollywood, California, April 19, 1963, and September 10, 1963

- The Best of Brant Inn OCLC 475099399

Broadcast, Brant Inn, Burlington, Ontario, Canada, June 12, 1963
"Waltz of the Prophets" (performed)

- Live at Newport OCLC 46477173

Live Newport Jazz Festival, Newport, Rhode Island, July 4, 1963
"Waltz of the Prophets" (performed)

- Stan Kenton And His Orchestra

Recorded in Hollywood, California, September 10, 1963

- Stan Kenton / Jean Turner OCLC 9483691

Recorded in Hollywood, California, September 11 & 12, 1963

- Kenton In England OCLC 763117792, 67143474

Recorded at Free Trade Hall, Manchester, England, November 23, 1963
"Waltz of the Prophets" (performed)

- Kenton — Road Band '67 OCLC 318882779

Recorded at Moonlight Gardens, Coney Island Park, Cincinnati, Ohio, June 9 & 10, 1967
"Here's That Rainy Day," arranged by Barton
"Three thoughts," arranged by Barton
"The Singing Oyster," arranged by Barton

- The World We Know (Capitol, 1967)

Recorded in Hollywood, California, 2–5 PM, October 2, 1967; and 2—5 PM & 6—9 PM, October 3, 1967; 2—6:30 PM), October 4, 1967

- The Jazz Compositions of Dee Barton, Capitol Records OCLC 5384174

Recorded in Hollywood, California, December 19 & 20, 1967

1. "The singing oyster" ("The gay one")
2. "Three thoughts"
3. "Woman" ("The muse")
4. "New day" ("Elegy")
5. "Dilemma" ("The Chez Rah")
6. "Man"
7. "Lonely boy"

- Stan Kenton at Fountain Street Church — Part One OCLC 49868407

Recorded in Grand Rapids, Michigan, March 31, 1968
"Here's That Rainy Day" (performed)
"Three thoughts" (performed)
"Woman" ("The Muse") (performed)

- Stan Kenton At Fountain Street Church — Part Two

Recorded in Grand Rapids, Michigan, March 31, 1968
"My foolish heart," arranged by Barton
"Elegy" ("A New Day") (performed)

- Stan Kenton, Capitol Records (unissued)

Recorded in Hollywood, California, 11AM – 2PM, 2:45 – 5:45 PM, May 7, 1968
"Personal sounds part 1," arranged by Barton
"Personal sounds part 2," arranged by Barton
"Personal sounds part 3," arranged by Barton
"Personal sounds part 4," arranged by Barton
"Personal sounds part 5," arranged by Barton

- Stan Kenton And His Orchestra, Capitol Records

Recorded in Hollywood, California, July 15 3 — 6 PM, 1968
"MacArthur Park, parts 1 & 2," arranged by Barton
"The snake," arranged by Barton (unissued)

- Finian's Rainbow (Capitol, 1968) OCLC 7262471

Recorded in Hollywood, California, 3—6 PM, July 16, 1968; 3—6 PM, July 17, 1968; 3—7 PM, July 18, 1968
"How are Things in Glocca Morra?," arranged by Barton
"Lullaby" from Rosemary's Baby, arranged by Barton

Soley as arranger for Stan Kenton

- Live At Redlands University OCLC 4840170

Live at Memorial Chapel, Redlands University, Redlands, California, August 3, 4, 5, 1970
"MacArthur Park" (performed August 3, 1970)
"Here's That Rainy Day" (performed August 5, 1970)

As arranger

- Pete Jolly, Give a Damn, A&M Records (1969) OCLC 8782453

Live Donte's, North Hollywood, c. 1969
Brass arrangements by Barton

- Mark Masters' Jazz Composers Orchestra, Early Start OCLC 15862352

Recorded in Hollywood, California, January 17 and March 27, 1984
"Turtle talk" (performed)

- Chicago Metropolitan Jazz Orchestra, Live And Screamin', Chicago Lakeside Jazz (1998) OCLC 57443657

Recorded live at FitzGerald's Night Club, Chicago, Illinois, November 1997
"Here's that rainy day" (performed)

== Film scores ==
Year	Title	Director	Notes
1971	Dirty Harry	Don Siegel	Additional cues
1971	Play Misty for Me	Clint Eastwood	
1972	The Marshal of Windy Hollow	Jerry Whittington	
1973	Magnum Force	Ted Post	Additional cues
1973	High Plains Drifter	Clint Eastwood	
1974	Thunderbolt and Lightfoot	Michael Cimino	
1978	Every Which Way but Loose	James Fargo	Unused score
1982	Death Screams	David Nelson	
1983	Hit the Road Running	Worth Keeter	
1984	Tales of the Third Dimension	Earl Owensby; Worth Keeter; Thom McIntyre; Todd Durham	
1984	Chain Gang	Worth Keeter	
1986	Unmasking the Idol	Worth Keeter	
1987	Order of the Black Eagle	Worth Keeter	
1987	Damon's Law	Thom McIntyre	
