= Lush Interlude =

Studio album by Stan Kenton
- Released: 1958
- Recorded: July 14–15, 1958
- Studio: Capitol (Hollywood)
- Genre: Jazz
- Label: Capitol ST 1130
- Producer: Lee Gillette

Stan Kenton chronology
The Ballad Style of Stan Kenton (1958)	Lush Interlude (1958)	The Stage Door Swings (1958)

Lush Interlude is an album by bandleader and pianist Stan Kenton featuring performances of Kenton's signature compositions from the 1940s in new arrangements featuring a large string section along with the Kenton trombones. The trumpet and sax sections were omitted and Bud Shank's solo flute is the only woodwind utilized. Recorded in 1958, the album was released on the Capitol label.

== Reception ==
Professional ratings
Review scores
Source	Rating
Allmusic	3/5 stars

The Allmusic review by Scott Yanow noted "Some of the music is quite romantic (particularly "Interlude" and "Opus in Pastels") and the renditions of such tunes as "Concerto to End All Concertos," "Collaboration," and "Artistry in Rhythm" certainly sound much different than the originals. A successful and often-haunting effort, well worth exploring".

== Track listing ==
All compositions by Stan Kenton except where noted.

1. "Interlude" (Pete Rugolo) - 4:21
2. "Collaboration" (Rugolo, Kenton) - 4:21
3. "Opus in Pastels" - 4:04
4. "A Theme for My Lady" (Rugolo) - 3:34
5. "Artistry in Bolero" (Rugolo) - 3:34
6. "Concerto to End All Concertos" - 6:37
7. "Machito" (Rugolo) - 2:51
8. "Theme to the West" - 4:39
9. "Lush Waltz" (Rugolo) - 4:14
10. "Artistry in Rhythm" - 4:35
- Recorded at Capitol Studios in Hollywood, CA on July 14, 1958 (tracks 1, 2, 5, 6 & 10) and July 15, 1958 (tracks 3, 4 & 7–9).

== Personnel ==
- Stan Kenton - piano, arranger
- Jim Amlotte, Milt Bernhart, Bob Fitzpatrick, Kent Larsen - trombone (tracks 1, 2 & 4–10)
- Ken Shroyer - bass trombone (tracks 1, 2 & 4–10)
- Bud Shank - flute, alto flute, piccolo
- Israel Baker, David Frisina, Ben Gill, Murray Kellner, Lew Klass, Dan Lube, Alfred Lustgarten, Erno Neufeld, Lou Raderman, Nathan Ross, Paul Shure, Marshall Sosson - violin
- Virginia Majewski, Alex Neimann, Sanford Schonbach, David Sterkin - viola
- Armand Kaproff, Robert La Marcina, Kurt Reher, Joseph Saxon (tracks 1, 2, 5, 6 & 10), Eleanor Slatkin (track 3, 4 & 7–9) - cello
- Laurindo Almeida - guitar
- Don Bagley (tracks 1, 2, 5, 6 & 10), Joe Mondragon, Red Mitchell (tracks 3, 4 & 7–9) - bass
- Frank Flynn (tracks 1, 2, 5, 6 & 10), Shelly Manne (tracks 3, 4 & 7–9) - drums
- Larry Bunker - percussion
- Pete Rugolo - conductor, arranger
