= Order of the Black Eagle (film) =

- Directed by: Leonard Worth Keeter III
- Screenplay by: Phil Behrens
- Story by: Robert P. Eaton
- Produced by: Robert P. Eaton; Betty J. Stephens
- Starring: Ian Hunter; Charles K. Bibby; William T. Hicks; Anna Rapagna; Jill Donnellan; Shangtai Tuan; Gene Scherer; Wolfgang Linkman
- Cinematography: Irl Dixon
- Edited by: Matthew Mallinson
- Music by: Dee Barton
- Production company: Polo Players Ltd.
- Distributed by: International Film Market
- Release dates: December 1987 (Shelby, North Carolina)
- Running time: 93 minutes
- Language: English

Order of the Black Eagle (aka Black Eagle) is an American action B movie released in December 1987. The film is a sequel to Unmasking the Idol, a 1986 spy film by the same director (Keeter), story-writer (Eaton), and screenplay writer (Behrens). Leonard Worth Keeter III directed the film in Shelby, North Carolina, at Earl Owensby Studios, and the surrounding area.

== Plot ==
Duncan Jax, played by Ian Hunter, must stop neo-Nazis from destroying communication satellites and awakening Hitler from a cryogenic sleep. Jax assembles a band of the dirtiest fighters in the world to do it.

== Cast ==
Interpol Spy Agency

- Ian Hunter — Duncan Jax, secret agent
- Charles King "Chuck" Bibby — Star, head of spy agency
- Jill Donnellan — Tiffany Youngblood, undercover agent, and Jax assistant
- Shangtai Tuan — Sato, secret agent gadget designer

Duncan Jax's mercenaries

- Anna Maria Rapagna – Maxie Ryder
- Joe Coltrane — Hammer
- James Eric — Jake, aka "Juice"
- Bill Gribble — cowboy
- Dean Whitworth — Bolt
- Terry James Loughlin — S.
- Typhoon — "Boon," the Baboon, Duncan's pet and sidekick

Special appearance

- Flo Hyman — Spike, knife-wielding mercenary

Neo-Nazi group, "Order of the Black Eagle"

- William T. Hicks — millionaire Baron Ernst von Tepisch, leader of a neo-Nazi group
- Wolfgang Linkman — Colonel Wilhelm Stryker, Nazi security chief

Rest of cast

- Gene Scherer — Dr. Kurtz
- Stefan Krayk — Dr. George Brinkmann, Jr., laser scientist
- Tony Ellwood — Hitler (cameo appearance)

== Post production ==
- Editor — Matthew Ernest Mallinson
- Assistant Editor — Lewis Andrew Schoenbrun
- Music — Dee Barton, original score composer and conductor
