= Stan Kenton Conducts the Los Angeles Neophonic Orchestra =

1965 album by Stan Kenton

Studio album by Stan Kenton
- Released: 1965
- Recorded: September 27, 28 & 29, 1965
- Studio: Capitol (Hollywood)
- Genre: Jazz
- Length: 51:56
- Label: Capitol MAS 2424
- Producer: David Axelrod and John Palladino

Stan Kenton chronology
Kenton / Wagner (1964)	Stan Kenton Conducts the Los Angeles Neophonic Orchestra (1965)	Stan Kenton Plays for Today (1966)

Stan Kenton Conducts the Los Angeles Neophonic Orchestra is an album by bandleader Stan Kenton recorded in 1965 by Capitol Records.

== Reception ==
Professional ratings
Review scores
Source	Rating
Down Beat (Original Lp release)	3/5 stars
Allmusic	2/5 stars
The Penguin Guide to Jazz Recordings	3/4 stars

Critical opinion remains divided. The Allmusic review by Scott Yanow observed "Much of the time the results are somewhat pompous and stiff ... The music, like the project, had good intentions but is uneven". On All About Jazz William Grim wrote "It's nice to think there was a time in the not too distant past when an album like this could have gotten nominated for a Grammy. Fortunately, this CD gives us an insight into what was undoubtedly one of the most important experiments in the history of modern jazz".

== Track listing ==
1. "Fanfare" (Hugo Montenegro) - 3:09
2. "Prelude and Fugue" (John Williams) - 9:22
3. "Passacaglia and Fugue" (Allyn Ferguson) - 8:30
4. "Music for an Unwritten Play" (Jim Knight) - 7:13
5. "Adventure in Emotion: Pathos/Anger/Tranquility/Joy/Love and Hate" (Russell Garcia) - 15:02
6. "Piece for Soft Brass, Woodwinds and Percussion" (Clare Fischer) - 8:40 Bonus track on CD reissue
- Recorded at Capitol Studios in Hollywood, CA on September 27, 1965 (track 3), September 28, 1965 (track 5) and September 29, 1965 (tracks 1, 2, 4 & 6).

== Personnel ==
- Stan Kenton - conductor
- Gary Barone, Frank Huggins, Ollie Mitchell, Ronnie Ossa, Dalton Smith - trumpet
- Gil Falco, Bob Fitzpatrick, Vern Friley - trombone
- Jim Amlotte - bass trombone
- John Bambridge - tuba
- John Cave, Vincent DeRosa, Bill Hinshaw, Arthur Maebe, Dick Perissi - French horn
- Bud Shank - alto saxophone, clarinet, flute, alto flute, piccolo
- Bill Perkins - alto saxophone, tenor saxophone, clarinet, flute, alto flute, piccolo
- Bob Cooper - tenor saxophone, clarinet, bass clarinet, oboe
- Don Lodice, John Lowe - tenor saxophone, baritone saxophone, bass saxophone, clarinet, E-flat clarinet, bass clarinet, contrabass clarinet, flute, alto flute, piccolo
- Emil Richards - vibraphone
- Claude Williamson - piano
- Dennis Budimir - guitar
- John Worster - bass
- Nick Ceroli - drums
- Frank Carlson - tympani, percussion
