= Rendezvous Ballroom =

Coordinates: 33°36′06″N 117°54′02″W

The Rendezvous Ballroom was a large dance hall built in 1928, located on the beach of Balboa Peninsula in Orange County, Southern California, between Los Angeles and San Diego. The 1920s were the beginning of the heyday of public dancing to the music of popular bands and orchestras, and large ballrooms were built in most urban areas, and even on Catalina Island, 26 miles off the California coast.

No expense was spared in the construction of the ballroom, which was a city block long, and half a block wide. It featured reinforced concrete walls, a "floating" hard wood floor and a tile roof. After a fire in 1935 the ballroom was rebuilt with an arched roof supported by sectional girders of wood in a cross pattern, the same as used in the nearby blimp hangars for the Marine Corps.

The Rendezvous Ballroom caught fire again in 1966, and was never rebuilt. The site now has beachfront condominiums.

== Famous performers ==
Among the notables who played at the Rendezvous was Stan Kenton, jazz band leader, who originated a TV show from there in 1957-58 and recorded the albums Rendezvous with Kenton (1957) and Back to Balboa (1958) at the venue. The ballroom was closed until surf-rock guitarist Dick Dale began performing there in 1960. Attendance grew from a few hundred to a capacity crowd of 4,000 on Saturday nights. When Dale left for the Pasadena Civic Auditorium in 1962, attendance at the Rendezvous continued to grow with bands like The Beach Boys, The Challengers, The Righteous Brothers, The Turtles and others.
