= Don Bagley =

American jazz bassist (1927–2012)

- Born: Donald Neff Bagley; July 18, 1927; Salt Lake City, Utah, U.S.
- Died: July 26, 2012 (aged 85)
- Genres: Jazz
- Occupation: Musician
- Instrument: Double bass
- Years active: 1945–1984

Donald Neff Bagley (July 18, 1927 – July 26, 2012) was an American jazz bassist.

== Career ==
Bagley was born on July 18, 1927, in Salt Lake City, Utah. He received formal training on the double bass. He studied in Los Angeles and played in 1945 with Shorty Sherock and Wingy Manone, and in 1948 with Dick Pierce. From 1950 to 1953, and sporadically thereafter, Bagley played with Stan Kenton; during Bagley's time with Kenton, "A Study for Bass" by Bill Russo and "Bags" by Bill Holman were written to feature Bagley's playing. Beginning in 1954, he fronted his own ensembles. Between 1950 and 1952, he worked extensively as a session musician with Nat King Cole, Maynard Ferguson, and Dexter Gordon. In the middle of the 1950s, he played in Europe with Zoot Sims, Lars Gullin, Frank Rosolino, and Åke Persson. Between 1956 and 1967, he again worked with Kenton and with Les Brown; toward the end of the 1950s, he also played with Jimmie Rowles, Shelly Manne, and Phil Woods. In 1957 and 1958, he recorded three albums under his own name. In 1959 he played with Pete Fountain; in 1961, he did a session with Ben Webster. In 1964, he performed in Japan with Julie London. In the 1970s and 1980s, Bagley composed and arranged for film and television, including the scores to Mama's Dirty Girls (1974), The Manhandlers (1974), The Swinging Barmaids (1975), The Student Body (1976), Young Lady Chatterley (1977) and Sacred Ground (1983). Between 1976 and 1984, he worked with Burt Bacharach.

Bagley died on July 26, 2012, at the age of 85.

== Discography ==
- Basically Bagley (Dot, 1957) with Jimmy Rowles, Shelly Manne
- Jazz On The Rocks (Regent, 1958; CD reissue on Blue Moon, 1999) with Phil Woods, Eddie Costa, Sal Salvador, Charlie Persip
- The Soft Sell (Dot, 1958; CD reissue on Blue Moon, 1999) with Paul Horn, Jimmy Rowles, Shelly Manne

== As sideman ==
With The Everly Brothers

- In Our Image (Warner Bros., 1966)
- The Everly Brothers Sing (Warner Bros., 1967)

With Stan Kenton

- Innovations in Modern Music (Capitol, 1950)
- Stan Kenton Presents (Capitol, 1950)
- Popular Favorites by Stan Kenton (Capitol, 1953)
- Sketches on Standards (Capitol, 1953)
- This Modern World (Capitol, 1953)
- Portraits on Standards (Capitol, 1953)
- Kenton Showcase (Capitol, 1954)
- The Kenton Era (Capitol, 1955)
- Kenton with Voices (Capitol, 1957)
- Lush Interlude (Capitol, 1958)
- Two Much! (Capitol, 1960) with Ann Richards
- Stan Kenton! Tex Ritter! (Capitol, 1962) with Tex Ritter
- Artistry in Bossa Nova (Capitol, 1963)
- Artistry in Voices and Brass (Capitol, 1963)
- Kenton / Wagner (Capitol, 1964)
- The World We Know (Capitol, 1967)
- The Jazz Compositions of Dee Barton (Capitol, 1967)
- The Innovations Orchestra (Capitol, 1997)

With Lee Konitz

- Lee Konitz Plays (Disques Vogue, 1953)

With Randy Newman

- Randy Newman (Reprise, 1968)

With Shorty Rogers

- Modern Sounds (Capitol, 1951)

With Pete Rugolo

- Rugolo Plays Kenton (EmArcy, 1958)

With Frank Sinatra

- That's Life (Reprise, 1966)

With Nancy Sinatra

- Boots (Reprise Records, 1966)

With The Sugar Shoppe

- The Sugar Shoppe (Now Sounds, 1968)

With Ben Webster

- The Warm Moods (Reprise, 1961)
