= Vinnie Dean =

American jazz musician (1929–2010)

- Born: Vincent Nicholas diVittorio; August 8, 1929; Mount Vernon, New York, U.S.
- Origin: New York City, New York, U.S.
- Died: September 14, 2010 (aged 81) Danbury, Connecticut, U.S.
- Genres: Jazz
- Instruments: Saxophone, flute, piccolo

Vincent Nicholas diVittorio (August 8, 1929 – September 14, 2010), known professionally as Vinnie Dean, was an American jazz saxophonist and businessman, primarily active in the 1950s and 1960s.

== Life and career ==
Dean was primarily an alto saxophonist, although he also performed on flute and piccolo. He played in New York City after World War II with Shorty Sherock and Johnny Bothwell, and recorded with Charlie Spivak and Charlie Barnet in the late 1940s. Between 1950 and 1955 he played with Elliot Lawrence, Stan Kenton, Ralph Burns, and Eddie Bert, recording with all of them. He was less active from the late-1950s, but still performed or recorded later in his career with Hal McKusick, Ray McKinley, Urbie Green, Sal Salvador, and Benny Goodman, as well as returning to play with Lawrence and Barnet. From the 1960s onward, he was involved in the music business, operating a publishing outlet, a booking agency, a recording studio, and a vinyl shop. Dean died in Danbury, Connecticut on September 14, 2010, at the age of 81.
