= Bill Perkins (saxophonist) =

American jazz saxophonist and flutist (1924–2003)

- Born: William Reese Perkins; July 22, 1924; San Francisco, California, U.S.
- Died: August 9, 2003 (aged 79) Sherman Oaks, Los Angeles, California
- Genres: Jazz
- Occupation: Musician
- Instrument: Saxophone
- Years active: 1944–2003
- Label: Pacific Jazz

William Reese Perkins (July 22, 1924 – August 9, 2003) was an American cool jazz saxophonist, clarinetist and flutist, popular on the West Coast jazz scene, known primarily as a tenor saxophonist.

Born in San Francisco, California, United States, Perkins started performing in the big bands of Woody Herman and Jerry Wald. He worked for the Stan Kenton orchestra, which led to his entry into the cool jazz idiom. He began performing with Art Pepper and Bud Shank. He was also a member of The Tonight Show Band from 1970 to 1992 and The Lighthouse All-Stars. In the 1960s, Perkins had a second career as a recording engineer.

He died of cancer in his Sherman Oaks home at the age of 79.

== Discography ==
- The Brothers! with Al Cohn and Richie Kamuca (RCA Victor, 1955)
- On Stage (Pacific Jazz, 1956)
- Tenors Head-On with Richie Kamuca (Liberty, 1957)
- Just Friends with Art Pepper, Richie Kamuca (Pacific Jazz, 1957)
- Bossa Nova with Strings Attached (Liberty, 1963)
- Quietly There (Riverside, 1966; released 1970)
- West Coast Conference (A World of Jazz, 1974)
- The Front Line with Pepper Adams (Trio, 1978)
- Confluence (Interplay, 1979)
- Serious Swingers with Bud Shank (Contemporary, 1987)
- Remembrance of Dino's (Interplay, 1989)
- I Wish On the Moon (Candid, 1992)
- Warm Moods with Frank Strazzeri (Fresh Sound, 1992)
- Live at the Royal Palms Inn Vol. 5 with Shorty Rogers (Woofy, 1994)
- Live at the Royal Palms Inn Vol. 9 with Pete Candoli, Carl Fontana (Woofy, 1994)
- Perk Playz Pres (Fresh Sound, 1996)
- Swing Spring (Candid, 1999)
- Live at the Lighthouse 1964 with J. C. Heard (Fresh Sound, 2019)

=== As sideman ===
With Chet Baker

- Chet Baker Big Band (Pacific Jazz, 1956)
- Pretty/Groovy (World Pacific, 1958)

With Louis Bellson

- Big Band Jazz from the Summit (Roulette, 1962)

With Nat King Cole

- L-O-V-E (Capitol, 1965)

With Clifford Coulter

- Do It Now! (Impulse!, 1971)

With Clare Fischer

- Thesaurus (Atlantic, 1969)

With Dizzy Gillespie

- The New Continent (Limelight, 1962)

With Stan Kenton

- Kenton Showcase (Capitol, 1954)
- Contemporary Concepts (Capitol, 1955)
- Kenton in Hi-Fi (Capitol, 1956)
- Kenton with Voices (Capitol, 1957)
- Rendezvous with Kenton (Capitol, 1957)
- Back to Balboa (Capitol, 1958)
- The Ballad Style of Stan Kenton (Capitol, 1958)
- The Stage Door Swings (Capitol, 1958)
- Kenton / Wagner (Capitol, 1964)
- Stan Kenton Conducts the Los Angeles Neophonic Orchestra (Capitol, 1965)

With Barney Kessel

- To Swing or Not to Swing (Contemporary, 1955)

With John Lewis,

- Grand Encounter (1956)

With Carmen McRae

- Can't Hide Love (Blue Note, 1976)

With Art Pepper and Conte Candoli

- Mucho Calor (Andex, 1957)

With Mark Murphy

- Playing the Field (Capitol, 1960)

With André Previn

- The Subterraneans (Soundtrack) (MGM, 1960)

With Shorty Rogers

- Shorty Rogers Plays Richard Rodgers (RCA Victor, 1957)
- Afro-Cuban Influence (RCA Victor, 1958)
- Shorty Rogers Meets Tarzan (MGM, 1960)
- The Swingin' Nutcracker (RCA Victor, 1960)
- An Invisible Orchard (RCA Victor, 1961 [1997])
- Jazz Waltz (Reprise, 1962)

With Pete Rugolo

- 10 Saxophones and 2 Basses (Mercury, 1961)

With Lalo Schifrin

- Bullitt (soundtrack) (Warner Bros., 1968)

With Bud Shank

- Bud Shank - Shorty Rogers - Bill Perkins (Pacific Jazz, 1955)
- Bud Shank & the Sax Section (Pacific Jazz, 1966)

With Gerald Wilson

- California Soul (Pacific Jazz, 1968)
