= Lennie Niehaus =

American saxophonist and composer (1929–2020)

- Niehaus in the late 1950s

Background information
- Born: Leonard Niehaus; June 1, 1929; St. Louis, Missouri, U.S.
- Died: May 28, 2020 (aged 90) Redlands, California, U.S.
- Genres: Jazz, West Coast jazz, film score
- Occupations: Composer, arranger, orchestrator
- Instrument: Alto saxophone
- Label: Contemporary
- Website
- Military service
- Allegiance: United States
- Branch: United States Army
- Service years: 1952–1954
- Unit: 6th Infantry Division Band

Leonard Niehaus (June 1, 1929 – May 28, 2020) was an American alto saxophonist, composer and arranger on the West Coast jazz scene. He played with the Stan Kenton Orchestra and served as one of Kenton's primary staff arrangers. He also played with Ray Vasquez and trombonist and Vocalist, Phil Carreon and other jazz bands on the U.S. West Coast. Niehaus had a close association as composer and arranger on motion pictures produced and directed by Clint Eastwood.

== Life and career ==
=== Education and active years as a musician ===
Niehaus was born in St. Louis, Missouri on June 1, 1929 to Aaron "Père"and Clariss (Weissman) Niehaus. His mother was a homemaker. His father, a Russian immigrant, was a violinist who played in an orchestra that accompanied silent films in theaters. In the mid-1930s, after talking pictures had taken hold, he moved the family to Los Angeles, where he played in Hollywood studio orchestras. His sister was a concert pianist. His father started him on violin at age seven, then he switched to bassoon. At thirteen, Niehaus began alto saxophone and clarinet, about this time he began composing. In 1946, after graduation from Roosevelt High School, Niehaus started to study music at Los Angeles City College later earning a music education degree from Los Angeles State College in 1951 as part of the school's first full graduating class. Niehaus began his professional career arranging for and playing alto saxophone with Phil Carreón and His Orchestra in the Los Angeles area. Members of the band included saxophonists Herb Geller, trombonist Ray Vasquez, Herbie Steward, and saxophonist Teddy Edwards.

=== Stan Kenton Orchestra ===
After completing college in 1951, Niehaus got his start with the Stan Kenton Orchestra and toured with the band for six months out on the road. His association with Kenton was interrupted as he was drafted into the Army in 1952 and served at Fort Ord in California. After being discharged in 1954, he rejoined Kenton for five years as the lead alto saxophonist. He composed and arranged extensively for the Kenton band being a feature soloist and having numerous arrangements featured on Kenton's Capitol Records releases. He had the longest and most recorded tenure of any of the lead alto players with the group, including such players as Charlie Mariano, Lee Konitz, Gabe Baltazar, and Tony Campise. Niehaus left the Kenton orchestra as an instrumentalist in 1959 to pursue music composition in the studio; “I put my horn away and started writing instead.” He continued to serve as a staff arranger for Kenton into the 1960s. He would go on during that time to write and arrange music for entertainers acts such as the King Sisters, Mel Tormé, Dean Martin, and Carol Burnett.

=== Orchestrating and composing for television and film ===
By the age of 33, in 1962, he began orchestrating for television and film composer Jerry Fielding. Niehaus worked with Fielding on approximately seventy TV shows and films like Hogan's Heroes, Charlie’s Angels and McMillan & Wife. Films on this list include Straw Dogs (1971), Bring Me the Head of Alfredo Garcia (1974) by Sam Peckinpah, the comedy The Bad News Bears (1976), and the horror film Demon Seed (1977). After Fielding’s death Niehaus came into his own as a leading film composer; he always did his own orchestrating for his scores, not using any ghost writers.

In his film scores, Niehaus never forgot his jazz roots. The story of the film City Heat (1984) was set in the 1930s, so he wrote jazz of that period, hiring people like altoist Marshal Royal. Bill Perkins came in and played like Lester Young; a jazz violinist sounded like Stéphane Grappelli. There was also a boogie woogie sequence with three pianists - Pete Jolly, Mike Lang, and co-star Clint Eastwood.

==== Work with Clint Eastwood ====
With Clint Eastwood, Niehaus had probably his most significant professional relationship. The two men had first met when serving together in the U.S. Army at Fort Ord during 1952 - 1954. Both found they had a passion for jazz music. Niehaus had already orchestrated scores for films starring Eastwood like Tightrope (1984), also produced by Eastwood. But it was not until Eastwood's eleventh film as director, Pale Rider (1985), that Niehaus actually wrote the first entire score for one of his films. Niehaus then wrote the musical scores for the following twelve films up to Blood Work (2002), and orchestrated the music for the next six features that Eastwood completed, from Mystic River (2003) to Gran Torino (2008). Niehaus won the BMI Film & TV Awards for Heartbreak Ridge (1986), Unforgiven (1992), The Bridges of Madison County (1995), and Space Cowboys (2000).

The most substantial collaboration between Niehaus and Eastwood which related directly to jazz was the 1988 biographical film on Charlie Parker, Bird. Besides a Golden Globe for Eastwood as best director, an Academy Award for best sound and many others, the score by Niehaus was nominated for a BAFTA Award, and won 2nd place at the Los Angeles Film Critics Association Awards, shared between Niehaus and Charlie Parker, due to a production process that had managed to electronically isolate Parker's saxophone solos from the original recordings and backed them with modern stereo recordings.

==== Other awarded film scores ====
Lennie Niehaus wrote the music for another jazz related feature, the 1993 TV movie Lush Life, in which Forest Whitaker, who played Charlie Parker in Bird, also starred as a jazz saxophonist. Niehaus won a Primetime Emmy Award for Outstanding Music Composition for a Miniseries, Movie, or a Special. In 2008 he was nominated again for Oprah Winfrey Presents: Mitch Albom's For One More Day.

=== Further works and educational publishing ===
His work includes Spiritual Jazz Suite, four pieces arranged for brass quartet, three sets of Christmas Jazz suites (4 pieces in each) and a Christmas Jazz Medley arranged for saxophone quartet. His educational publishing includes a book of classical saxophone duets, a beginning/intermediate/advanced method books for the understanding of jazz technique, and a book of jazz saxophone duets exemplifying jazz styles. After many years of not playing his alto saxophone at all, Niehaus returned to performing, reportedly in top form. He played saxophone as leader of his octet on his album, Sunday Afternoons At The Lighthouse Cafe (2004).

=== Later life and death ===
In addition to his film scores and orchestrations, Niehaus spent his final years playing with jazz combos in the Los Angeles area. He died in Redlands, California at the age of 90. Although a cause of death was not disclosed, his son-in-law said that it was likely heart-related.

== Selected discography ==
- Volume 1: The Quintets (1954, 7" & 10"; 1956, Contemporary 3518)
- Volume 2: The Octet, No. 1 (1954, 7" & 10"), Contemporary); LP reissue on Zounds!
- Volume 3: The Octet, No. 2 (1955, Contemporary 3503)
- Volume 4: The Quintets and Strings (1955, Contemporary 3510)
- Volume 5: The Sextet (1958, Contemporary 3524)
- Zounds! (1958, Contemporary 3540); reissue of The Octet, No. 1 with a further 1956 octet recording
- I Swing for You (1957, EmArcy 36118)
- The Lennie Niehaus Quintet: Live at Capozzoli's (2000, Woofy WPCD96)

With Stan Kenton

- Popular Favorites by Stan Kenton (Capitol, 1953)
- The Kenton Era (Capitol, 1940–54, [1955])
- Contemporary Concepts (Capitol, 1955)
- Kenton in Hi-Fi (Capitol, 1956)
- Kenton with Voices (Capitol, 1957)
- Rendezvous with Kenton (Capitol, 1957)
- Back to Balboa (Capitol, 1958)
- The Ballad Style of Stan Kenton (Capitol, 1958)
- The Stage Door Swings (Capitol, 1958)
- Kenton Live from the Las Vegas Tropicana (Capitol, 1959 [1961])
- Sophisticated Approach (Capitol, 1961) as arranger
- Adventures in Standards (Capitol, 1961) as arranger
- Stan Kenton! Tex Ritter! (Capitol, 1962) with Tex Ritter as arranger and conductor
- Stan Kenton / Jean Turner (Capitol, 1963) with Jean Turner as arranger
- Kenton / Wagner (Capitol, 1964)

== Selected television and film scores ==
- Faerie Tale Theatre (1984)
- Tightrope (1984)
- City Heat (1984)
- Pale Rider (1985)
- Sesame Street Presents: Follow That Bird (1985)
- Never Too Young to Die (1986)
- Ratboy (1986)
- Heartbreak Ridge (1986)
- Emanon (1987)
- Bird (1988)
- White Hunter Black Heart (1990)
- The Rookie (1990)
- Unforgiven (1992)
- Lush Life (TV movie, 1993)
- A Perfect World (1993)
- The Bridges of Madison County (1995)
- Dogwatch (1996)
- Absolute Power (1997)
- Midnight in the Garden of Good and Evil (1997)
- Pocahontas II: Journey to a New World (1998)
- True Crime (1999)
- The Jack Bull (TV, 1999)
- Space Cowboys (2000)
- Blood Work (2002)
- Oprah Winfrey Presents: Mitch Albom's For One More Day (TV, 2007)

== See also ==
- List of jazz arrangers
