= Bill Catalano =

American jazz trumpeter (1934–2005)

- Born: William Catalano Jr. July 9, 1934 (age 92); San Francisco, California, U.S.
- Died: July 15, 2005 (aged 71)
- Genre: Jazz
- Occupations: Musician; music contractor; music educator
- Instrument: Trumpet
- Years active: 1950s–2003
- Formerly of: Stan Kenton
- Education: San Francisco State University

William Catalano Jr. (July 9, 1934 – July 15, 2005) was an American jazz trumpeter who performed with Stan Kenton's orchestra in the late 1950s, appearing on at least 30 original recordings as well new compilations from the Capitol, Omega, Playboy, and Verve record labels. After returning to his hometown of San Francisco, he resumed playing the local scene as a sideman, bandleader, and musical contractor, hiring local musicians for numerous touring performers and shows. Alongside his performing career, he was an educator for 41 years, teaching music to middle school and high school students in San Francisco. One of his best known private students was trumpeter Jon Faddis.

== Early life ==
Billy Catalano Jr. was born on July 9, 1934, in San Francisco, California. He grew up in a musical family. His uncles, Frankie, Johnny, and Leo Catalano, were multi-instrumentalists. Along with his father, drummer Bill Catalano Sr., they would bring him to their gigs and challenge him to follow their lead in a constant trial by fire. By the age of 15, Catalano had played hundreds of professional gigs and gained knowledge in the Great American Songbook.

After attending James Denman Middle School and Balboa High School in the late 1940s through the early 1950s, Catalano attended and graduated from San Francisco State University. He was part of the first class that relocated the college's campus from its location at Buchanan and Haight streets to its current location near Lake Merced.

== Trumpet playing and musical contracting ==
In May 1957, Catalano joined Stan Kenton's band, playing in the trumpet section alongside Ed Leddy, Lee Katzman, Sam Noto, and Phil Gilbert.

As a youth, Catalano idolized Kenton and his trumpet players. Kenton had significant impact on Catalano's life as a bandleader and, later, as a teacher; "As a leader, Stan would really zero in on the young guys and lift them up constantly. For instance, he'd say to me, 'Billy, you're going to be my next Al Porcino. Now look at the back of that ballroom and just make noise!'"

After touring the United States with Kenton, he returned to his hometown and remained first call on the music scene, playing many nightclubs and casual music venues throughout the San Francisco Bay Area. During this period, he also established being one of San Francisco's busiest musical contractors. In two decades, he hired hundreds of local musicians for productions such as the Ice Follies, the Grand National Rodeo, Nureyev and Fonteyn's Ballet Tour at the War Memorial Opera House, and international shows brought to the Bay Area by producer Terry Terajima. Catalano served as musical contractor for numerous high-profile musicians, such as Marlene Dietrich, Harry Belafonte, Tex Beneke, Bette Midler, and Tony Bennett, when they performed in San Francisco.

== Teaching ==
Interspersed with a playing career that spanned 60 years, Catalano taught and inspired a multitude of young musicians. One of his most notable trumpet students is Jon Faddis, whom he met while teaching at Best Music in Oakland, California, after his short tenure with Kenton.

Recalling his time with Catalano, Faddis said:

"Well, Bill Catalano was very, very special, in that he exposed me to live jazz playing at a very young age. And at that time, this in the early sixties, you had to be 21 to go in a lot of the clubs. But, he would take me to rehearsal bands in San Francisco after my lesson. We would go over to San Francisco and they would have rehearsals, and they would play, you know, Billy Byers charts, and Frank Foster charts."

"He would just sit me in the section, I'd be sitting with my horn, and he'd say, 'Okay, now when this comes up, play these four bars.' And I'd just play the four bars and I'd play along just keep out of the way, but I was hearing these great players play in these big bands from an early age."

In the late 1970s, Catalano returned to his alma maters, Balboa and Denman, to direct the bands and rebuild the instrumental music program at both schools.

As part of media coverage for a donation of musical instruments to Denman by Ronald McDonald House charities of the Bay Area, Catalano was interviewed by the San Francisco Chronicle. The article became primarily focused on the "maestro of middle school" – "Music doesn't come from the lips. Music comes from someplace else, someplace more truthful than most lips. 'Lips don't play anything,' said Bill Catalano, the maestro of middle school, laying down his baton to impart a great truth. 'You're the one that plays. Not the instrument, the lips, the mouth or the fingers. You.' He leaned forward and grabbed his gut. 'Play from here,' he said."

== Retirement and cancer ==
After four years of battling throat and lung cancer, he decided to retire from teaching in 2003. Despite the loss of a quarter of his lungs from surgery, Catalano never stopped playing his trumpet daily, and he was dedicated to his music up to two weeks before he died, on July 15, 2005.

== Discography ==
From Bill Catalano on Discogs

Recording	Label	Year
Stan Kenton – Rendezvous With Kenton	Capitol Records	1958
Stan Kenton – Back To Balboa	Capitol Records	1958
Virgil Gonsalves Big Band Plus Six* – Jazz At Monterey	Omega Records	1959
Stan Kenton And His Orchestra – The Stage Door Swings	Capitol Records	1959
Two Shades Of Autumn – Various – The Playboy Jazz All-Stars, Volume 3 (3xLP, Comp)	Playboy Records	1960
Stan Kenton And His Orchestra – By Request – Volume I	Creative World	1972
Stan Kenton And His Orchestra – By Request – Volume VI	Creative World	1973
Stan Kenton And His Orchestra – Kenton '56 – The Concepts Era	Artistry Records	1983
Stan Kenton And His Orchestra – Return To Biloxi	Magic	1989
Stan Kenton And His Orchestra – Live in Biloxi	Magic	1989
Stan Kenton – At The Rendezvous Vol I	Status	1989
Stan Kenton – At The Rendezvous Vol II	Status	1989
Stan Kenton And His Orchestra – In A Mellow Mood	Total Recording	1991
Stan Kenton And His Orchestra – Live 1957-1959	Total Recording	1991
Stan Kenton And His Orchestra – Live From The Patio Gardens Ballroom Salt Lake City Utah 1957 Volume One	Magic	1992
Stan Kenton And His Orchestra – Live From The Patio Gardens Ballroom Salt Lake City Utah 1957 Volume Two	Magic	1992
Stan Kenton And His Orchestra – Live From The Patio Gardens Ballroom Salt Lake City Utah 1957 Volume Three	Magic	1992
Ann Richards With The Stan Kenton Orchestra* – I Hear Music – Recorded Live 1957-1958	Total Recording	1993
Stan Kenton And His Orchestra – Out Of Nowhere	Four Star	1994
Stan Kenton – The Ballad Style Of Stan Kenton	Capitol Jazz	1997
Kenton* – Kenton '58 Road Band!	Astral Jazz	1997
Anita O'Day – The Complete Anita O'Day Verve/Clef Sessions	Mosaic Records	1999
Kenton* – Odyssey 1951–1968	Astral Jazz	2000
Anita O'Day – Anita O'Day	Verve Records	2003
Stan Kenton – 'Live' From Birdland	Mr. Music	2008
Stan Kenton And His Orchestra With Ann Richards Plus The Four Freshmen – Road Shows	Tantara	2013
Jerry Coker – Composes-Arranges-Plays Modern Music From Indiana University And The Bay Area 1955-1956	Fresh Sound Records	2016
Stan Kenton And His Orchestra – Artistry In Jazz	Capitol Records	Unknown
Anita O'Day – Anita O'Day Sings The Winners	Verve Records	Unknown
