= Lee Gillette =

American record producer and musician (1912–1981)

- Born: Leland James Gillette; October 30, 1912; Indianapolis, Indiana, U.S.
- Died: August 20, 1981 (aged 68) Los Angeles, California, U.S.
- Genres: Country, jazz, pop
- Occupations: Record producer, A&R director
- Years active: c.1930–1965
- Label: Capitol

Leland James Gillette (October 30, 1912 – August 20, 1981), known professionally as Lee Gillette, was an American A&R director, record producer and musician.

== Biography ==
Born in Indianapolis, Gillette was raised in Peoria, Illinois, and then Chicago in the 1920s. He began singing and playing drums in local bands, often alongside his friend Ken Nelson with whom he formed a vocal trio, the Campus Kids. He joined the orchestra for the radio show Fibber McGee and Molly, moving in 1939 to Hollywood, where he met Glenn Wallichs, who recorded the show on transcription discs. Gillette went back to Chicago to work in radio, but, after Wallichs co-founded Capitol Records in 1942, Gillette returned to California to head its country music artists and repertoire section.

Gillette signed, and then worked as the producer for, most of Capitol's country stars in the immediate post-war period, including Tex Ritter, Jack Guthrie, Jimmy Wakely, Merle Travis, Tex Williams and Tennessee Ernie Ford, regularly using jazz musicians and horn sections on country and pop-oriented recordings. In 1950, Gillette moved to the company's pop music division, continuing to produce Ford but becoming increasingly associated with Nat King Cole, whose records Gillette produced from the early 1950s until Cole's death in 1965. Other musicians with whom Gillette worked at Capitol included Georgia Gibbs, Dean Martin, Peggy Lee, Joe "Fingers" Carr, Nelson Riddle, Stan Kenton, and Vic Damone. Gillette also composed songs with Carr (real name Lou Busch).

Gillette co-founded the music publishing company Central Songs, and helped organize the National Academy of Recording Arts and Sciences (NARAS).

After Cole's death, Gillette suffered from depression and retired shortly afterwards, spending much of his later years travelling the world with his wife. He only occasionally undertook production duties thereafter, notably with Alvino Rey. He died at his home in California in 1981, aged 68.
